= List of Teenage Mutant Ninja Turtles (2012 TV series) characters =

This is a list of characters from the 2012 Teenage Mutant Ninja Turtles series. It is an American animated series based on the eponymous characters. It premiered on Nickelodeon in the United States on September 28, 2012. It also premiered on YTV in Canada on September 29, 2012.

== Main characters ==
=== Heroes ===
The Teenage Mutant Ninja Turtles is a team of anthropomorphic red-eared slider turtle mutants who have been hidden ever since their mutations within the sewers of New York City and usually go up to the surface only in the night time.

- Leonardo (voiced by Jason Biggs in seasons 1 & 2, Dominic Catrambone for the remainder of season 2 and Seth Green in seasons 3–5) is an enthusiastic ninjutsu student, wears a royal blue mask, and fights with two long swords called Katanas. Leo is the oldest and most mature of the turtles and the second oldest of Splinter's children, he is the fearless leader of the Ninja Turtles. Following Splinter's death, he reluctantly stepped up to the increasingly difficult role of sensei, which added even more pressure onto him. Since the episode "The Deadly Venom", he is the only Ninja Turtle who is capable of using the spiritual, healing abilities of "the healing hands" technique to heal himself and others which enshrouds his body in a white aura by chanting the mantra and the right hand seals. Despite his strong sense of honor and loyalty towards his family and friends, Leo is a perfectionist who places an excessive amount of value in his title as leader, causing him to have something of a superiority complex and make reckless decisions. Nevertheless, he is mature enough to admit when he is in the wrong and fights to protect the city and his loved ones.
- Raphael (voiced by Sean Astin) is the physically strongest second eldest of his four brothers who serves as the muscle. He wears a red mask and fights with two sai. Known for his rage, he commonly takes it out on his brothers. He sports a crack at the top of his front shell as a result of Splinter's earlier encounters with the Kraang that were after him. Despite his anger issues and impulsive, overly rebellious nature stemming from them, Raphael openly and strongly loves, supports, and protects his family and allies and is no less conventionally heroic than any of them.
- Donatello (voiced by Rob Paulsen) is the smartest and second youngest of his four brothers. He is in charge of the design and manufacture of all of the tools and weapons in the Turtles' arsenal. He is also a gifted hacker. He wears a purple mask and fights with a rokushakubo which converts to a naginata via a blade inside one end of the staff. He has a crush on April and a rivalry with Casey because of it. Despite his intelligence, he can be anxious and can at times even get into a rage, but is often the most gentle and ultimately means well. Paulsen had previously voiced Raphael in the 1987 series of the same name.
- Michelangelo (voiced by Greg Cipes) is the youngest of the family and is a lover of video games, skateboarding, pranks and pizza. He wears an orange mask and fights with two nunchaku which convert into kusarigama via a blade inside of one of the sticks of each nunchaku and extra lengths of chain stored in the other. He loves to prank Donatello and Raphael the most. It is easy to tell that he is the youngest sibling on account of his most childish behaviors, being an immature turtle out of the four. He has an active imagination and he names all the mutated characters. Despite his immaturity, Michelangelo is the most optimistic and kindhearted of the brothers, often bringing a lighter mood to the team's adventures. Mikey is the first Ninja Turtles character with ADhD.

=== Allies ===
- Hamato Yoshi / Splinter (voiced by Hoon Lee) is the son and heir of Hamato Yūta, the leader of the Hamato Clan whose rivalry with the Foot Clan came to an end when he was a child, and the adoptive father of the turtles. During a confrontation with the Kraang, Hamato Yoshi was mutated into a mutant brown rat upon coming into contact with a rat before the conflict. Since then ever since alluding to the Kraang, he trained the Turtles in ninjutsu. During the Triceraton invasion, he is killed by Shredder but this attempt is foiled when the turtles travel back in time to save Earth. In the second-to-last episode of Season 4 titled "Requiem", he is again murdered by Super Shredder and buried at the O'Neil farmhouse. His spirit continues to watch over his family, imparting wisdom and advice to Leonardo, who reluctantly takes on the more challenging fatherlike role of sensei on his behalf.
- April O'Neil (voiced by Mae Whitman) is the plucky, resourceful, determined 16-year-old, daughter of Dr. Kirby O'Neil and the love interest/crush of Donatello. Contrary to her previous incarnations, she possesses extraordinarily strong psionic/extrasensory abilities; having been born a human/Kraang mutant hybrid, as a byproduct of her late mother being experimented on by the Kraang before she was born, which she gradually learns to develop further and increase considerably in strength as the show progresses; particularly in Season 4 and Season 5. Her psionic aura varies from being transparent, to white, to yellow. Since "Tale of Tiger Claw" her psychic and extrasensory powers have been greatly reduced, as she no longer can draw more strength from the mystical Sol Star necklace she had destroyed, but they are still far stronger than they were before she acquired the Aeons mystical gift. Her ninja weaponry is a Tessen and, later, a dragon tanto. She proves capable of such compassion for animals and also sees cyborgs as people for their personalities instead of bodies as shown by Professor Honeycutt. Donatello and Casey both have a crush on her and she has shown hints of feeling the same towards them too.
- Hamato Miwa / Karai (voiced by Kelly Hu) was the only 16-year-old human child, until mutated, and willful daughter of Hamato Yoshi (Splinter) and the late Tang Shen, who was taken away from Splinter by Oroku Saki when she was just an infant and renamed Karai. She is the oldest and only biological child of Master Splinter. Initially, she was their sworn enemy, but soon became a trusted ally after learning the truth about her parents and grew even closer to Leonardo, who had liked her since they first met. Karai was later accidentally mutated into a violet-and-white horned viper by Shredder where an extra chemical ingredient that Baxter Stockman accidentally got into the horned viper DNA enabled her to shift back and forth and assume hybrid forms. She had grown to ally herself with her adoptive brothers the Turtles, her true father Splinter, April, Casey and their allies. She is one-eighth Chinese through her maternal great-grandfather.
- Casey Jones (voiced by Josh Peck) is the teenage son of a former NHL player at April's school who April is hired to tutor for an extra credit assignment. He later became an ally of the Turtles. He has a crush on April (later friends with her) and a rivalry with Donatello because of it. He's prone to recklessness but means well. He is a close brotherly figure to Raph due to both sharing an eagerness to fight.
- The Mighty Mutanimals is a team of mutant animals that debut in "Battle for New York, Part One". They were brought together by Jack J. Kurtzman to fight the Kraang.
  - Slash (voiced by Corey Feldman) was Raph's pet ornate box turtle when he was originally named Spike. In the second season, Spike transformed into a mutant after jumping into a spilled mutagen then renamed himself "Slash" in "Slash and Destroy". He is the leader of the Mutanimals. In this version, Slash wields a mace. Feldman had previously voiced Donatello in the 1990 live-action film and its second sequel.
  - Leatherhead (voiced by Peter Lurie) is a sewer alligator that was mutated by the Kraang after the parents of his owner flushed him down the toilet. He was first introduced in "It Came from the Depths" in season one. He is Slash's second-in-command and is best friends with Mikey.
  - Pigeon Pete (voiced by A. J. Buckley) is a common pigeon that was mutated by the Kraang and has a fondness for sourdough. Pigeon Pete is the team's spy. He was later replaced by Mondo Gecko.
  - Jason / Mondo Gecko (voiced by Robbie Rist) was a popular high school skateboarder who while skating was hit on the head by a canister of mutagen that was accidentally dropped from the sky by the Turtles. He mutated into a mutant common leopard gecko due to his pet common leopard gecko being on his shoulder at the time. Rist previously voiced Michelangelo in the live-action film trilogy from 1990.
  - Dr. Tyler Rockwell / Monkey Brains (vocal effects provided by Frank Welker in "Monkey Brains", speaking voice provided by Tom Kenny since "Battle for New York, Part 1") is a neuroscientist who was mutated into a mutant chimpanzee by Dr. Victor Falco. He eventually was again experimented on where he regained his power of speech and gained psionic abilities of telepathy and telekinesis, similar to April's. He is the brains of the Mighty Mutanimals.
- Chompy Picasso (vocal effects provided by Dee Bradley Baker) is an alien turtle and the child of Tokka who has become Raphael's pet turtle since Season 4. Like his mother, Chompy can breathe fire. In an alternate future dominated by mutant animals, Chompy Picasso has grown up to be bigger than Raphael enough so for anyone to ride on.
- Timothy / Pulverizer / Mutagen Man (voiced by Roger Craig Smith) was an ineffective teenage ice cream truck vendor who fights crime as the Pulverizer after witnessing the Turtles' first battle with Baxter Stockman. He later consumed mutagen in hopes of becoming like the Turtles; however, due to not coming into any contact with any animal or plant, Timothy dissolved into a mutagen-drinking blob called Mutagen Man, but also becoming savage.
- Jack J. Kurtzman (voiced by Robert Forster) is a private investigator and journalist investigating the Kraang and their activities on Earth. He debuted in the Season 2 episode "The Kraang Conspiracy", and was the one who revealed April's mysterious childhood past and unique origins to her and the Turtles. Kurtzman also brought the Mighty Mutanimals together during the threat of the Kraang.
- Ice Cream Kitty (vocal effects provided by Kevin Eastman) is a stray tabby cat that April found in an alley. Deciding to find it a home, she asked Mikey to raise it as his pet. It mutated into Ice Cream Kitty upon eating Neapolitan Ice Cream that was covered in mutagen. Because of this, Mikey had to keep Ice Cream Kitty as cold as possible.
- Bigfoot (vocal effects provided by Diedrich Bader) is a cryptid that the Turtles encountered in the woods of Northampton in Upstate New York.
- Punk Frogs are a group of humanoid mutant American bullfrogs that are the results of mutagen being dumped near their pond during Mikey's fight with Mom-Thing in "Buried Secrets".
  - Attila the Frog (voiced by Maurice LaMarche) is the leader of the Punk Frog.
  - Genghis Frog (voiced by Kevin Michael Richardson) is the militaristic member of the Punk Frogs.
  - Rasputin the Mad Frog (voiced by Maurice LaMarche) is Attila the Frog's right-hand frog.
  - Napoleon Bonafrog (voiced by Jon Heder) is the laid-back member of the Punk Frogs who befriends with Michelangelo.
  - Frog Soldiers (voiced by Rob Paulsen, Josh Peck, and Kevin Michael Richardson) are a group of mutant frogs led by Genghis Frog and later by Napoleon Bonafrog who make up the foot soldiers of the Punk Frogs.
- Bernie (voiced by Bill Moseley) is a former physicist and general store proprietor who discovered the Dream Beavers forty years ago and stayed away for years as one of the ways to keep the Dream Beavers from escaping into Earth alongside a device he worked on called the Dream Plug that kept them at bay. When the Dream Plug was destroyed and the Dream Beavers weren't much of a threat on Earth causing them to return to the Dream Dimension, Bernie finally fell asleep.
- Dr. Cluckingsworth M.D. is a white chicken at the O'Neil Family summer house that develops a large brain-shaped cranium at the top of her head after ingesting the mutagen sample taken from Donnie after it leaks from Speed Demon.
- Garson Grunge / Muckman (voiced by Nolan North as a human in earlier appearances, Grant Moninger starting in "The Noxious Avenger") was a humble sewer worker who had encounters with mutants in the past. While working as a garbage man, he was accidentally mutated into a garbage mutant with garbage-controlling abilities.
  - Joe Eyeball (voiced by Grant Moninger) was originally Garson's left eye until it gained a form of his own during the mutation. He acts as Garson's conscience.
- Renet Tilley (voiced by Ashley Johnson) is a young, immature, tomboyish time sorceress and the girl whom Mikey has a crush on and who seems to reciprocate his feelings. She seems to keep in touch with Mikey, even far off in the future, as Mikey was shown to be talking to a hologram of her in "When Worlds Collide Pt. 1". She returns to present New York City in the episodes "The Curse of Savanti Romero", "The Crypt of Dracula" and "The Frankenstein Experiment" again needing the Turtles' help in stopping Savanti Romero from dominating all space-time by traveling back in time, to when Dr. Victor Frankenstein lived.
- Lord Simultaneous (voiced by Jim Piddock) is a time master who is Renet's mentor and father. He mainly appears with a smoky head in his first appearance.
- The Hamato Clan is the ninja clan to which Hamato Yoshi belonged, and the ancestral enemies of the Foot Clan.
  - Hamato Yūta (voiced by Hoon Lee) is Hamato Yoshi's father and the adopted father of Oroku Saki, and the last leader of the Hamato Clan before Shredder came to power.
  - Hamato Soldiers is a group of ninjas that make up the infantry of the Hamato Clan.
- Professor Zayton Honeycutt / The Fugitoid (voiced by David Tennant) was an alien scientist from Dimension X. He created the Heart of Darkness as a power source until he was bribed by Kraang Subprime to sell it to them. Honeycutt was reconstructed into a cyborg after his body was destroyed by a Triceraton attack on his lab with his brain intact. He replaces Splinter as the Turtle's mentor for the first half of the fourth season after he saves the Turtles, April, and Casey with his ship the Ulixes.
- Shinigami / Shini (voiced by Gwendoline Yeo) is a 17-year-old Buddhist witch who is a member of Karai's Foot Clan. She is an old friend of Karai's from Japan and assists her in retaking the Foot Clan to rectify the wrongs they committed. Her dark magic abilities include hypnotizing her opponents with a mesmerizing stone as well as terrifying them with illusions, turning into a black cat, and creating a swarm of bats. Shinigami's gloves have hidden claws and her weapon is a customized kusarigama which is strong enough to break concrete and wood. She is Michelangelo's second love interest. In The Forgotten Swordsman, she, along with Casey Jones, gets injured by Karai's old mentor Hattori Tatsu. In a three-part episode saga Crossover Tales, she teams up with the Turtles, their 1987 counterparts, the Mighty Mutanimals, April O'Neil, Casey Jones (Teenage Mutant Ninja Turtles) and Karai (Teenage Mutant Ninja Turtles) in hunting down Bebop and Rocksteady, who are recruited by 1987 Shredder and Krang.
- Wingnut (voiced by Daran Norris) is an alien big brown bat superhero who is a character from Michelangelo's comic book. He was brought to life by April O'Neil's crystal fragment of the Aeon's mystical Sol Star.
  - Screwloose (voiced by Jeff Bennett) is an alien yellow fever mosquito who is Wingnut's sidekick. He was brought to life by April's crystal fragment of the mystical Sol Star.
- Victor Frankenstein (voiced by Grant Moninger) is a human scientist of the distant past. His scientific expertise is required by the Turtles and Renet who travel back to his timeline to have him defeat the reawakened vampire lord Count Dracula and Savanti Romero.
- Miyamoto Usagi (voiced by Yuki Matsuzaki) is a highly skilled samurai European rabbit from another dimension; presumably an alternate reality of feudal Japan. He is the loyal bodyguard of a boy named Kintaro who is said to possess superhuman abilities. He befriends the Turtles after they are spirited away to his world, and works together to save his charge from Jei by taking him to the Temple Palace. He is Leonardo's closest of allies, as they are both masters of dual katana and value honor.
- Akemi (voiced by Brittany Ishibashi) is an esteemed cat shrine maiden of Kintaro's home village, which had been ransacked by Sumo Kuma and his fellow ronin on Jei's behalf. Although badly hurt, she managed to hide Kintaro and had Usagi travel with the boy to protect him from Jei.
- Kintaro (voiced by Evan Kishiyama) is a spoiled, arrogant young pug who possesses powerful superhuman abilities that he has yet to tap into and develop fully. He is hunted by the wolf Jei but is protected by Usagi as his loyal bodyguard whom he is not pleased with. He starts tapping into his inherent superhuman powers at his sacred Temple Palace of the Sky and becomes more humble in the process. He is nicknamed "Pugtaro" by Raph and Mikey.
- Mira (voiced by Jessica DiCicco) is a mutant meerkat living in an alternate future dominated by mutant animals. She lost her family and had to survive alone while searching for the Holy Chalupa to decipher the map to the Oasis that is tattooed on her arm and is also sought out by Maximus Kong and Verminator Rex.

== Villains ==
=== Foot Clan ===
The Foot Clan is a ninja criminal organization that was founded 1,500 years ago in Japan by a ninja named Koga Takuza when he forged an alloy stronger than steel from the stolen sacred totems of his defeated adversaries to fashion a helmet known as the Kuro Kabuto.

Among the known members of the Foot Clan are:

- Oroku Saki / Shredder (voiced by Kevin Michael Richardson) is the ruthless and vengeful leader of the Foot Clan and one of the two main antagonists of the series. Adopted by the Hamato Clan after the original Foot Clan was defeated, Saki was raised as a brother to Yoshi until spurred by both his unrequited feelings for Tang Shen and learning his true heritage. As a result of an ensuing battle, Shredder was left badly burned and scarred after unintentionally killing Shen, leaving Yoshi to die while stealing away his daughter Miwa to raise as his child. Upon learning of Yoshi's survival, and later his mutation into Splinter, Shredder vowed a vendetta against him and the turtles. This led to his dealings with the Kraang and ultimately placing his want to kill Splinter over his survival. He does succeed in killing Splinter during the Triceraton Invasion, but the Turtles travel back in time to save Earth and warn Splinter, foiling Shredder's attempt and resulting in him being mortally wounded. Shredder had to subject himself to a refined mutagen to heal his wounds while gaining new power. This results in him becoming Super-Shredder who is larger with retractable claws in his hands and blades coming out of his back, arms, shoulders, parts of the legs, knees, and feet. He eventually succeeds in killing Splinter a second time by running him through with his mutated arm blades and is ultimately destroyed by Leonardo's katanas. But in season five, Shredder is revived as a zombie by Kavaxas, having lost sense of time while dead and gaining regenerative abilities and telekinesis. While forced to serve Kavaxas, the Zombie Shredder ultimately played a role in Kavaxas' defeat where he dragged him back to the Netherworld.
- Takeshi / Tiger Claw (voiced by Eric Bauza) was a Japanese boy who was mutated by the Kraang as a child into a 6 1/2 ft. humanoid mutant Bengal tiger called Tiger Claw with razor-sharp fangs and claws, heightened smell, and superhuman strength upon coming in contact with a Bengal tiger. He and his sister Alopex subsequently became circus performers and then a pair of dangerous assassins, though she later removed his tail in a rage for making her a criminal as well as the fact that their parents were one of his victims. Since then, he has been planning to have his revenge against his sister for her betrayal as she plans to do the same. He later lost his left eye after his first engagement with the Turtles and ended up in the 1987 cartoon series dimension, but eventually returned and became Shredder's second-in-command. When Tiger Claw faced off against Alopex again, half of his right arm was severed by her and was replaced with a cybernetic arm. During the fifth season, Tiger Claw attempted to use Kavaxas to revive Shredder. However, the attempt nearly started an apocalypse and Tiger Claw renounced his vendetta against the turtles.
- Chris Bradford / Dogpound / Rahzar (voiced by Clancy Brown) was a world-famous martial artist who is secretly a prized member of the Foot Clan, armed with a 400-year-old katana and owning a chain of dojos across the country to recruit Foot Soldiers. He mutated into a mutant Akita called Dogpound as a result of being bitten by Shredder's pet Akita Hachinko, hampering most of his fighting abilities as he attempted to find a means to restore his humanity. Being knocked into a mutagen vat caused Dogpound to be mutated further into a near-skeletal werewolf form dubbed Rahzar. He has served as Michelangelo's rival ever since he pretended to befriend him to get info on Splinter. After drowning in the season four finale following his fight with Leatherhead, Rahzar was brought back to life by Kavaxas in the fifth season. During the final fight with Kavaxas, Tiger Claw knocked Rahzar into the abyss leading to the Netherworld.
- Xever Montes / Fishface / Mr. X (voiced by Christian Lanz) was an Afro-Brazilian street urchin who was left to roam the criminal underworld of São Paulo, eventually being recruited by Shredder after attempting to steal something belonging to him. He later mutated into the mutant snake-head Fishface after touching a northern snakehead in a Chinatown marketplace. Following the mutation, he wears a water-breathing rig and mechanical legs developed by Baxter Stockman. Fishface is always paired up with Rahzar despite their rivalry and he serves as Raph's primary rival on the battlefield. Fishface eventually leaves the Foot Clan in season five at the start of Kavaxas' apocalypse plans.
- Baxter Stockman (voiced by Phil LaMarr) was a child prodigy who tried proving his brilliance at a science fair at school by presenting a volcano with real lava, which ended up burning down the gym and getting him expelled. After being caught using his Mousers to steal from the Purple Dragons, Baxter was eventually brought into Shredder's services and reversed-engineered much of the Kraangs' technology before he briefly escaped. After being recaptured upon his lab being found by Dogpound, Stockman was outfitted with an explosive mutagen collar by Dogpound to hinder any further treachery. After failing a few more times when making worthy mutants for the Foot Clan that included a duck mutant, the collar is triggered by Shredder and Stockman is mutated into a mutant housefly that calls himself Stockman-Fly. As a side effect, Stockman develops a taste for chocolate bars and spits on them before consumption. He later placed in charge of mutagen experiments. While Shredder is bedridden in the aftermath of the Triceraton invasion, Stockman oversees Shredder's mutagen intake and creates Antrax and Scumbug to assist him in an attempt to replenish the Foot's wealth. He is finally restored to his original human form by Donatello's retro-mutagen during the final battle against Super-Shredder.
- Ivan Steranko / Rocksteady (voiced by Fred Tatasciore) was a Russian arms dealer and artifact collector with a gold tooth and a diamond right eye, who is an old friend and business partner of Shredder. However, a falling out resulted in Steranko being mutated into a mutant black rhinoceros called Rocksteady after being pushed into a mutagen vat filled with black rhinoceros DNA. At the end of Season 5, Bebop and Rocksteady decided to be "superheroes" and moved to a different state.
- Anton Zeck / Bebop (voiced by J.B. Smoove) was a professional thief in a high-tech suit with a purple X-ray visor, and invisibility function and other high-tech gadgets. Hired by Steranko to steal the Kuro Kabuto, Zeck was later mutated into a mutant common warthog called Bebop after being shoved into a mutagen vat filled with common warthog DNA. At the end of Season 5, Bebop and Rocksteady decided to be "superheroes" and moved to a different state.
- Chrome Dome (voiced by Nolan North) is a ninja android in a dark ninja outfit (which resembles Chris Bradford's full ninja outfit) armed with a plasma sword and whip. Chrome Dome was originally built by the Kraang to keep the Foot Clan sufficient with their invasion plan.
- Hattori Tatsu (voiced by Michael Hagiwara) is a blind swordsman operating in Japan who was taken in by Shredder at a young age and became his right-hand man. Following Super-Shredder's death, Tatsu planned to succeed Shredder by obtaining the Kuro Kabuto and had some competition from Karai, who was once his pupil. As Tiger Claw and Rahzar claim the Kuro Kabuto, Tatsu's soul was drained from his body by Kavaxas.
- Shredder Mutants (all voiced by Kevin Michael Richardson) are mutant clones created by Baxter Stockman from the DNA of Shredder and different crustaceans, all three of them based on Shredder Elite from the Mirage Comics. They serve as the guards of the Foot Clan's lab. While Mikey fights Baxter Stockman, the others fight the Shredder Mutants. Once Splinter manages to regain his mind, he defeats the Shredder Mutants by kicking them into the giant fan below. In "Meet Mondo Gecko", silhouettes of a second set of Shredder Mutants are seen among the audience during the race. In "Attack of the Mega Shredder!", the Shredder Mutants were re-created and were tricked into the mutagen vat by Bebop and Rocksteady, fusing them into a giant crustacean abomination called the Mega Shredder that went on a rampage in the city before it was destroyed by the Turtle Mech.
  - Shiva Shredder is a large four-armed clone of Shredder who was created from the DNA of Shredder and a crab which also gives him a crab shell.
  - Claw Shredder is a clone of Shredder who was created from the DNA of Shredder and a lobster, giving him lobster-like claws and a tail.
  - Mini Shredder is a miniature clone of Shredder who was created from the DNA of Shredder and a shrimp, giving him a shrimp-like mustache and tail.
  - Mega Shredder is a giant hybrid of the Shredder Mutants.
- Foot Soldiers are an army of ninjas loyal to Shredder, making up the soldiers of the Foot Clan.
- Footbots are an army of robot Foot Soldiers created by the Kraang Hive Mind to strengthen the Foot Clan, replacing the human members over time. The Footbots can adapt to any move and have retractable arms as well as sporting retractable fabric wings for gliding.
  - Elite Footbots are the stronger versions of the Footbots that were created to strengthen the Foot Clan during its civil war with Karai's faction. They resemble Chrome Dome, except for the fact that they wear metal kasas on their heads.
- Foot Cultists – The first Foot Cultist was an unnamed homeless man who mutated upon coming into contact with the Super-Shredder's mutagen blood and captured various people to mutate them into photophobic creatures who wear hooded cloaks. Because of their origins and Shredder-like appearance, the Foot Cultists possess Shredder's genetic memory and act on it when Tiger Claw finds them. Tiger Claw used the Foot Cultists to obtain the Scroll of the Demodragon and the Seal of the Ancients to control Kavaxas in their plans to revive Shredder.

=== The Kraang ===
The Kraang are a race of brain-shaped aliens from Dimension X, piloting robotic bodies called Kraangdroids that are either covered in a blue bodysuit, or not. They are responsible for bringing some mutagen to Earth a thousand years ago. As revealed in "The War for Dimension X", the Kraang are Utroms that are psychically controlled by Kraang Prime resulting in the Kraang Hive Mind. As they became extensions of Kraang Prime's will with trace remnants of individuality, they all address one another as "Kraang", and they have not mastered English and communicate in redundant speech; for example, "Kraang, destroy the ones who call themselves 'the turtles' when that which is the signal is the signal that I give". The Kraang also have enemies in the form of the Utroms whom Kraang Prime could not place under mind control, and the Triceraton Empire for destroying their homeworld. The Kraang appeared to have mostly been destroyed during the events of "Annihilation: Earth!"

Among the known Kraang are:

- Kraang / Kraang Prime (voiced by Roseanne Barr in seasons 1 and 2, Rachel Butera in season 3) is a 25 ft. brain-shaped alien who is the leader of the Kraang and one of the main antagonists of the series. Originally a Utrom scientist, Kraang discovered a mutagen within the Kraathatrogon worms and used his research to evolve into his current state while using his gained psychic powers to enslave most of his species and rename them after himself. Kraang Prime is later destroyed in the episode of "Annihilation: Earth!" by the Triceratons when they shoot down the Technodrome which sunk beneath the harbor.
- Knight / Kraang Subprime (voiced by Gilbert Gottfried) is an Utrom turncoat with a robotic left eye, a huge scar, a blue tattoo across his right eye, and a robotic claw on his left front tentacle. Serving as the Kraang's master spy, being the only one among them to fully master the human language, Subprime poses as Irma Langinstein (voiced by Kate Micucci) who is April O'Neil's best friend in high school. Before joining the Kraang willingly and being revealed to be Bishop's brother as well as a hero among their kind, Subprime was originally known as Knight. It was also revealed that he is related to the 1980s Krang. While killed in "Annihilation: Earth!" by the Triceratons upon the Technodrome being shot down over the harbor, Subprime was last encountered by the Turtles months before his demise in "The War for Dimension X" and "Trans-Dimensional Turtles".
- Ms. Campbell (voiced by Cassandra Peterson) is a research scientist from the World Wide Genome Project who takes an interest in April O'Neil and is revealed to be an unpiloted Kraangdroid.
- Kraang Soldiers (both voiced by Nolan North) are the generic foot soldiers of the Kraang. They mostly move around in the Kraangdroid bodies and the "Normans" which they use to blend into human society, yet they still retain their redundant speech patterns.
- Biotroid is a Yeti-type bio-mechanical suit with powerful arms, blades on its chest, and butt-mounted cannons.
- Dracodroid is a two-headed cyborg dragon creature created by the Kraang that serves as their mode of transportation.
- Irma-Bots are androids who resemble Kraang Subprime's Irma Laginstein disguise. They were based on the designs by the Utrom Rook.

==== Dimension X creatures ====
The Kraang have used various creatures that come from Dimension X to help them in their plots.

Among the Dimension X creatures are:

- Rock Soldiers are a duo of nearly identical 20 ft. humanoid rock monsters from Dimension X with regenerating abilities who serve the Kraang as guards.
  - Traag is a 20 ft. lava-spewing rock monster from Dimension X with regenerating abilities who is in service to the Kraang. He first appeared in "TCRI", where he was brought by the Kraang through a portal that connected TCRI to Dimension X. He proved to be a challenge to the Turtles, so Leatherhead ended up dragging him through the portal back to Dimension X. In "Showdown", Traag was seen guarding the portal when the Kraang upgraded it with a force field. When the Turtles tried to destroy it, they drew the attention of him and the Kraang, so Leonardo used the laser to disintegrate Traag. In "Into Dimension X", Traag teamed up with Granitor to attack the Turtles near the Kraang's facility in Dimension X. However, they were both defeated by Michelangelo in his "savage" suit when he used his voice to break apart the part of the cliff both rock monsters were on.
  - Granitor is a 20 ft. blue fire-spewing rock monster from Dimension X with regenerating abilities who resembles Traag (but is pale pink) and is in service to the Kraang. He first appeared in "Into Dimension X", where he teamed up with Traag to attack the Turtles near the Kraang's facility in Dimension X. However, they were both defeated by Michelangelo in his "savage" suit when he used his voice to break apart the part of the cliff both rock monsters were on.
- Kraathatrogons are a race of 100 ft. alien worms from Dimension X with antennae used as riding reins that the Kraang "milk" for mutagen.
- Long-Tongue Worms are small alien worms from Dimension X.
- Rocktopus is a giant octopus/insect-like alien from Dimension X that sports a small creature-like attachment to draw in its prey.
- Living Atoms are a group of sentient large atoms from Dimension X that shoot a bolt of electricity. They first appear in "Into Dimension X", where they attack the Turtles until they finally manage to outrun them.
- Bio-Electrical Eyeball is a gigantic sun-size eyeball from Dimension X that shoots electricity at its enemies. It first appears in "Into Dimension X", where it blows up a nearby ship with electricity.

=== Purple Dragons ===
The Purple Dragons are a Chinese-American street gang that has been extorting shop owners for protection money on the Lower East Side. They are often in league with the Foot Clan.

Among the known members of the Purple Dragons are:

- Hun (voiced by Eric Bauza) is the new and official leader of the Purple Dragons and a high expert in the martial arts following the Kraang's control over Manhattan being thwarted. He has a rivalry with Casey Jones.
- Fong (voiced by Andrew Kishino) is the unofficial leader of the Purple Dragons in the first two seasons who is sometimes armed with a butcher knife. He leads the Purple Dragons when Rahzar and/or Fishface aren't around until Hun comes into view.
- Sid (voiced by Andrew Kishino) is a large Chinese-American member of the Purple Dragons who is sometimes armed with an axe.
- Tsoi (voiced by James Sie) is a mustached Chinese-American member of the Purple Dragons who is sometimes armed with a sledgehammer.

=== Triceraton Empire ===
The Triceraton Empire is an empire that is inhabited by Triceratons, a race of Triceratops-like aliens. Triceratons breathe nitrogen and the oxygen in Earth's atmosphere can lead to delusions. The Triceraton Empire has been at war with the Kraang for millennia, a conflict that has resulted in the destruction of the Triceraton home world through the Heart of Darkness (a black hole generator) and thus left the Triceratons obsessed with annihilating their enemies by any means necessary, such as destroying any planet that the Kraang want to take over. They are also enemies with the Salamandrians. In the first half of the fourth season, having appeared to wipe out the Kraang in the season three final, the Triceratons replaced the Foot Clan as one of the main villains in the series. Except for Captain Mozar, all the Triceratons have names that start with Z.

Among the known Triceratons are:

- Emperor Zanmoran (voiced by Michael Ironside) is the ruler of the Triceraton Empire, a 250-centimeter (8.2 ft) Triceraton with a more ornate uniform including a cape. Zanmoran is a sadistic ruler, having decreed Earth's destruction due to its Kraang infestation. After the Turtles travel back in time to prevent this, they are captured during their infiltration of the Triceraton Mother Ship, and their efforts impress Zanmoran enough that he orders them to be thrown into the arena. When the Fugitoid is captured during an effort to rescue them, Zanmoran attempts to force him to repair the Black Hole Generator, but he refuses. The Turtles subsequently escape by briefly taking Zanmoran hostage.
- Captain Mozar (voiced by Michael Dorn) is the Supreme Commander of the Triceraton army with a broken horn and a prosthetic beak, initially introduced as a captain. He is a 250-centimeter (8.2 ft) Triceraton who is a cunning and brutal military commander. He answers only to the Triceraton Emperor and aims to destroy the enemy at any cost. He debuts in "Annihilation: Earth" Pt. 1 where he leads the Triceraton invasion on Earth to destroy it and thus prevent the Kraang from using it as a new homeworld, and employs the Heart of Darkness previously used by the Kraang to destroy the Triceraton homeworld. However, the Turtles escape Earth's destruction and then travel back in time six months to prevent this event from happening. They would eventually cross paths with Mozar during their quest where he was promoted to Admiral for successfully retrieving the first piece of the Heart of Darkness. It is later stolen back by the Turtles during their raid on Emperor Zanmoran's ship. Mozar was later demoted back to Captain by the time he attacked the Ulixes to reclaim the Heart of Darkness fragment. Even though the Skeevix Virus launched at the Ulixes was defeated, his soldiers were successful at reclaiming the two fragments of the Heart of Darkness.
- Sergeant Zog (voiced by Lance Henriksen) is a 260-centimeter (8.5 ft) Triceraton who serves as a scout for the Triceraton army, who is based on Zog from the Mirage Comics. He debuts in "Dinosaur Seen in the Sewers!" where he temporarily befriends Raphael. Due to being poisoned by Earth's atmosphere, he is initially delusional, striking at virtually any being he comes across and rambling on about his mission. After recovering his equipment at the Statue of Liberty, he recognizes Raphael's deception and attacks him before launching a beacon to summon the Triceraton armada to Earth. Left clutching onto a ledge on the Statue of Liberty, Zog refuses Raphael's offer of help and drops from the torch quoting "Long Live the Triceraton Empire".
- Commander Zoran (voiced by Kevin Michael Richardson) is a commander in the Triceraton army.
- Commander Zorin is the second-in-command of the Triceraton army who assisted Mozar in the attack on Earth.
- Sergeant Zark is a sergeant of the Triceraton army who assisted Mozar in the attack on Earth.
- General Zera (voiced by Kate Mulgrew) is a female Triceraton that was introduced in the TV film "Half-Shell Heroes: Blast to the Past". She is in command of a Triceraton operation in the Cretaceous period seeking to obtain the rare mineral Chronite and use its time-traveling properties to conquer and plunder various periods. Despite commanding a Triceraton garrison, a force of Robot-Raptors, and a Robo-Spinosaurus, she was defeated by the Turtles and their dinosaur allies. Zera is the first known case of a Triceraton female in the series, as all other Triceratons who have appeared onscreen have shared the stereotypical male design.
  - Lieutenant Zorg (voiced by Fred Tatasciore) is an overweight Triceraton who serves under General Zera.
- Lieutenant Zovox (voiced by Michael Dorn) is a Triceraton that accompanied Captain Mozar to the planet Xaava-Dal.
- Zarus (voiced by Kevin Michael Richardson) is a Triceraton scientist who accompanied Captain Mozar to the planet Xaava-Dal.
- Zeno (voiced by John DiMaggio) is a 491-centimeter (16.11 ft) Triceraton warrior who was condemned to the Tri-Arena for not wanting to help Emperor Zanmoran search for the fragments of the Heart of Darkness. Since his imprisonment, he has become a star gladiator; he is thus reminiscent of the 2003 series character Traximus. Zeno fought the Turtles in the arena after giving them advice about their first match, but was later convinced to help them escape due to their shared contempt for the Heart of Darkness/Black Hole Generator.
- Lieutenant Zax (voiced by Clancy Brown) is a Triceraton who assisted Captain Mozar in reclaiming the two fragments of the Heart of Darkness from the Turtles and later obtaining the final fragment of the Heart of Darkness from the planet Magdomar.
- Triceraton Soldiers (Various Voices) are the foot soldiers of the Triceraton Empire.

=== Honey Badger Ravagers ===
The Honey Badger Ravagers are a gang of mutant honey badgers that work for Maximus Kong in an alternate future that is dominated by mutant animals following the detonation of a mutagen bomb.

Among the known members are:

- Verminator Rex (voiced by Nyambi Nyambi) is a honey badger with a cybernetic left eye and a cybernetic left chainsaw arm who is the leader of the Honey Badger Ravagers. He is loosely based on the character Verminator-X from the TMNT Archie comic series.
- Aviator Ravager (voiced by Kevin Michael Richardson)
- Eyepatch Ravager (voiced by Nyambi Nyambi) is an eyepatch-wearing member of the Honey Badger Ravagers.
- Grill Ravager (voiced by Kevin Michael Richardson)
- Jock Ravager (voiced by Nyambi Nyambi)
- Leather Ravager (voiced by Kevin Michael Richardson)
- Painted Ravager (voiced by Nyambi Nyambi)
- Ravager Spy (voiced by Dee Bradley Baker) is the Honey Badger Ravagers' spy.
- Top Hat Ravager (voiced by Dee Bradley Baker) is a top hat-wearing Ravager.
- Honey Badger Ravagers Members (variously voiced by Dee Bradley Baker and Kevin Michael Richardson) are the unnamed members of the Honey Badger Ravagers.

=== Scale Tail Clan ===
Scale Tail Clan is a group of mutant lizards in an alternate future that is dominated by mutant animals following the detonation of a mutagen bomb.

Among the known members are:

- Imperius Reptilicus (voiced by Keith Morris) is a mutant lizard who is the leader of the Scale Tail Clan.
- Scale Tail Scribe (voiced by Kevin Michael Richardson) is a mutant lizard and scribe of the Scale Tail Clan who attempts to decipher the map to the Oasis that is tattooed on Mira's arm.
- Scale Tail Clan Members (variously voiced by Dee Bradley Baker, Brian Bloom, Scott Menville, and Kevin Michael Richardson) is the unnamed members of the Scale Tail Clan.

=== Other villains ===
- Snake / Snakeweed (voiced by Danny Jacobs) was a street thug working for the Kraang as their getaway driver. He was later mutated into Snakeweed, a mutant plant monster upon falling into some plants.
- Vic / Spider Bytez (voiced by Lewis Black) was a crabby New Yorker in his 40s who was accidentally mutated into a black spider mutant called Spider Bytez after coming in contact with a red spider.
- Dr. Victor Falco / Rat King (voiced by Jeffrey Combs) was a scientist presumably working for the Kraang on an experiment involving mutagen and monkey DNA. He was later exposed to a neurochemical during an accident that deformed him into a corpse-like state while enabling him to control rats and took on the name Rat King. The explosion in his lab that caused this also took his sight, leaving him blind and enabling him to see through his rats. Falco became Rat King where he sported bandages and a plague doctor outfit. In his first encounter with Splinter, Rat King took control of him. Splinter managed to break free from Rat King's mind control and defeat him, but his rats make off with Rat King's body. In the next encounter, Rat King managed to use a combination of mutagen and a growth serum to enlarge some of his rats. Rat King is eventually killed when Splinter throws him off a ledge in the Undercity. Splinter later hallucinated seeing Rat King when he fell down the same pit. After snapping out of the hallucination, Splinter saw Rat King's skeleton.
  - Aristotle is an albino rat who is the Rat King's primary source of visual input. He either possesses or is ascribed greater intelligence than the other rats by the Rat King, who at times acted as though Aristotle were speaking to him. Aristotle is eventually killed in a fight with Splinter.
  - The Giant Rats are rats that were created by Rat King upon exposing them to a combination of Mutagen and a Growth Serum that made them 12 ft. long. Rat King named them after Roman emperors.
    - Caligula is a giant rat who serves as Rat King's mode of transportation.
    - Claudius, Nero, and Commodus are the other three giant rats that are named by Rat King.
  - Rat Man Freak (voiced by Jason Biggs) is a deformed humanoid mutant rat who just appears in "Of Rats and Men". He is a product of Rat King's attempts to create Rat People.
- Justin is a composite mutant that was the result of Karai pushing a button in the Worldwide Genome Project's laboratory that caused a combination of DNA from various animals (examples of the DNA samples seen are a jellyfish, an isopod, an octopus, a cobra, and a house cat) to be poured into the mutagen vat during the Turtles fight with the Kraang. This gave him octopus tentacles for legs, a cobra-like neck, an isopod shell on his head, jellyfish-shaped eyestalks, cat ears, and a cobra-like tongue.
- SpyRoach / Cockroach Terminator is a cockroach that was trained by Donnie to spy on the Kraang with special micro-equipment in "Cockroach Terminator". It accidentally fell into the mutagen vat and mutated with the micro-equipment fused onto it.
- Parasitica Wasp is a giant mutant parasitoid wasp that mind-controls the Turtles into protecting its egg by stinging them (the mind-controlled victims infect their enemies by biting them).
- K'Vathrak / Newtralizer (voiced by Danny Trejo) is a fire-belly newt-type Salamandrian in a weapon-upgraded suit of high-tech armor with a huge mouth used to eat the Kraang and was considered dangerous to them. Since the Newtralizer has returned, he has acquired electricity-based power that makes him unstoppable. He is later revealed to be a war criminal, assassin, and old ally of Lord Dregg who has eluded the Salamandrian authorities.
- Squirrelanoids are a group of 9 ft. humanoid mutant eastern gray squirrels with red skeleton-like skin, glowing green eyes and mouths, and retractable tongues with a secondary head that resembles Xenomorphs. It was the result of an eastern gray squirrel drinking mutagen from a spilled canister.
- April Derp (voiced by Mae Whitman) is a rejected deformed clone of April O'Neil who only appears in "The Kraang Conspiracy". April Derps (who are regular April clones) are destroyed by the original April with a psychic attack.
- Fungus Humungous (voiced by Fred Tatasciore) is a humongous one-eyed mutant mushroom that can grow smaller mushroom spawns and release spores that cause people to see their worst fears. It was created when a mutagen canister fell near it.
- Antonio / Pizza Face (voiced by John DiMaggio) was an Italian pizza chef who ran Antonio's Pizza until he ingested mutagen thinking that it would be a good pizza topping. As a result, he turned into a mutant pizza with pizza-controlling abilities. At the end of the episode, he is seen alive in Mikey's pizza box.
- Ho Chan (voiced by James Hong) is a powerful martial artist during China's Shang dynasty whose martial arts powers were so incredible that they were mistaken for sorcery. Chan is based on Lo Pan from the film Big Trouble in Little China.
- The Creep is a regenerating 8 ft. mutant swamp monster made of mud and moss with the clothes of a sun-beaten scarecrow, superhuman strength, and vines used as whips growing out of his body. It was the result of Leonardo vomiting the mutagen medicine on the banks of a stream. Parts of Creep are eventually fused with the Son of Snakeweed to form Creepweed.
- The Finger (voiced by Jesse Ventura) is a hunter and animal collector wearing a shrunken head around his neck that he refers to as his mother. His name is attributed to an extra finger he has on his right hand.
- Mom Thing (voiced by Renae Jacobs) is a Kraang/human abomination that was made from the DNA of a Kraang and the DNA of April's mother Mrs. O'Neil where it had a copy of her thoughts.
- The Dream Beavers are a family of oversized humanoid North American beavers from the Dream Dimension with dream-infiltrating abilities who sought to take over Earth after they were brought to the dreams of Earth's people when a physicist named Bernie was working on a dimension-traveling machine called the Dream Plug. Outside the Dream Dimension once Casey destroyed the Dream Plug, they are the size of normal beavers. Not pleased with the results, the Dream Beavers return to the Dream Dimension.
  - Dire Beaver (voiced by Robert Englund) is the purple-furred leader of the Dream Beavers with glowing red eyes and a bomb symbol tattooed on his stomach who infiltrates Leo's dream.
  - Dark Beaver (voiced by John Kassir) is a red-furred member of the Dream Beavers with glowing red eyes and a flaming skull symbol tattooed on his stomach who infiltrates Donnie's dream.
  - Dread Beaver (voiced by Robert Englund) is an orange-furred member of the Dream Beavers with glowing red eyes and a crying cracked skull symbol tattooed on his stomach who infiltrates Raph's dream.
  - Dave Beaver (voiced by John Kassir) is a blue and pink-furred member of the Dream Beavers with blue eyes and a rainbow-and-starred heart symbol tattooed on his stomach who infiltrates Mikey's dream that the Turtles shared dreams. Dave is an unintelligent member of the group and is often a source of annoyance to his brothers in a fashion similar to Michelangelo and the Turtles.
- Speed Demon (voiced by Steve Blum) is a mutant purple muscle car (a mix between a 1970 Dodge Charger R/T, a 1969 Chevrolet Camaro, a 1971 Ford Mustang, and a 1971 AMC Javelin SST) capable of turning whoever is driving it into its mutant host with the need for speed. It was created after the car ran over a spilled mutagen supply that Rasputin the Mad Frog lost during the Punk Frogs' fight with the Turtles in "The Croaking", which brought it to life. It is the only known non-animated object to have been turned into a mutant.
- Chimera is an 11 ft. mutant falcon/fish/earthworm hybrid. It is the result of a falcon getting soaked with mutagen from the exploded Speed Demon after it catches and consumes a fish with an earthworm in its mouth.
- Don Vizioso (voiced by Brian Bloom) is a crime lord of an Italian mafia branch in Manhattan. He owns his restaurant and is an old business partner of Shredder where he is often seen eating food and making use of a flying chair with different functions in it.
  - Vic and Vincenzo Fulci (both voiced by Eric Bauza) are twin brothers who work for Don Vizioso. They serve Don Vizioso as his bodyguards and collectors of transactions.
  - The Hammer (voiced by Eric Bauza impersonating Sylvester Stallone) is a mob enforcer who works for Don Vizioso. The Hammer has a mech suit that has a gripping claw, a large mallet, and rocket launchers which he wears when he goes into battle against any mutants. His soul was later drained by Kavaxas.
- Savanti Romero (voiced by Graham McTavish) is the evil mutant time master who plotted to obtain Lord Simultaneous' Time Scepter. He was mutated into his monstrous state by Lord Simultaneous as punishment for his evil actions. In "Monsters Among Us!", he gets eaten by a tyrannosaurus rex after his defeat.
- Son of Snakeweed are a spawn of Snakeweed created by Creep who puts mutagen into one of Snakeweed's severed claws. Unlike Snakeweed, Son of Snakeweed doesn't speak. Parts of Son of Snakeweed eventually fuse with Creep to form Creepweed.
- Creepweed is a fusion of the parts of Creep and Son of Snakeweed. It was defeated by Donatello using a Retro-Mutagen-based weed killer. Donnie keeps its remains in a metal box.
- Lord Vrinigath Dregg (voiced by Peter Stormare) is an arrogant insectoid crime lord who is the ruler of the planet Sectoid 1 and the lord of all insect life in the galaxy. When the Turtles incur his wrath while on the planet Varanon, a spaceport for smugglers, space pirates, and other space criminals that are not in the Federation, Lord Dregg becomes one of their most dangerous enemies, he vows to hunt them down and destroy them no matter what. He replaces Shredder as one of the main villains in the first half of the fourth season. During the fifth season, he resurfaces where he collaborates with his old ally Newtralizer to invade Earth.
  - Robug Vreen are the biomech grasshopper-type insectoid offspring of Lord Dregg. The Vreen are a hive-mind alien race originating from Sectoid 1. They answer to Dregg alone. Without his presence, the Vreen are incapable of acting on their initiative.
  - Hornetron is Lord Dregg's sentient hornet-shaped ship that serves as his mode of space transportation.
- Wyrm (voiced by Dwight Schultz) is an earthworm-haired wish-granting creature who is one of the three reality-bending creators of chaos that were trapped in hypercubes one millennium ago and scattered across the cosmos.
- Armaggon (voiced by Ron Perlman) is a vicious shark-like alien bounty hunter and space assassin who is wanted in 87 star systems. He is an old friend of Lord Dregg.
- Overmind (voiced by Jim Piddock) is an A.I. Program at the abandoned VX3 Warbot Factory that became self-aware where its goals are to destroy all organic lifeforms and take over all mechanical lifeforms.
  - VX3 Warbots (both voiced by Jim Piddock) are the best warbots in the galaxy until the factory that manufactured them was taken over by Overmind and they began serving Overmind in its goals to annihilate all organic lifeforms.
- Bellybomb / Vrax Belebome (voiced by Charlie Murphy) is an alien with one eyestalk and a mouth on his stomach who is a shady information dealer and has connections with Lord Dregg.
- 80s Krang (voiced by Pat Fraley) is the villain from the 1987s cartoon series and a nemesis of the 1987s Turtles. In this show, Krang is depicted as a former member of the 2012 Kraang who banished him to the two-dimensional world of the 1980s Turtles due to his incompetence. After being granted a chance at redemption, he set out to destroy the worlds of the 1987 series, the 2012 series, and the original Mirage Comics by teaming up with his cousin Kraang Subprime. After their bombs were defused, Subprime learned of Krang's plans which made him furious as the Kraang had been attempting to conquer those worlds for thousands of years. As the two of them fight with Subprime remembering why he was banished in the first place, Krang is banished back to the 1987s reality by Subprime and later suspected by the 1987s Turtles of having a hand in the arrival of a Kraathatrogon. Krang later returned to the 2012 reality with 80s Shredder where they recruited the 2012 Bebop and Rocksteady after their versions were left behind. The backstory of 80s Krang is a departure from the character's origins as depicted in the 1987 series, which depicted him as a disembodied brain from a Tyrannosaurus-resembling reptilian humanoid being who had allied with the Shredder of that universe.
- Antrax is a mutant ant created by Baxter Stockman. It can reproduce by emitting its look-a-likes from its abdomen.
- Scumbug (voiced by Ted Biaselli) is a mutant stag beetle/spider hybrid created by Baxter Stockman from an unnamed businessman.
- Monoculus is a giant floating alien eye who is a character from Michelangelo's comic book series "Wingnut and Screwloose". It was brought to life by April O'Neil's crystal.
- Skullface McGilln (voiced by Fred Tatasciore) is a supervillain with a skull for a head who is a character from Michelangelo's comic book series "Wingnut and Screwloose". Skullface McGilln wields a staff called the Skeletonizer which enables him to summon skulls to attack his enemies. He was brought to life by April O'Neil's Sol Star fragment where he was defeated by Michelangelo, Wingnut, and Screwloose.
- Kavaxas (voiced by Mark Hamill) is the Lord of the Demodragons and ruler of the Netherworld who the main antagonist in the first four episodes of Season 5. He is dangerously powerful with the ability to fly, breathe green fire, shoot lasers from his hands, drain the souls out of anyone, have skin tough enough for a sword to break upon, and animate the dead. In addition, he is immune to April's exceptionally strong psionic powers. Kavaxas is called upon by Tiger Claw using the Scroll of the Demodragon, kept at bay with the Amulet of the Ancients as Tiger Claw plans to use Kavaxas' power to return Shredder to life. However, having killed Hattori Tatsu prior, Kavaxas revived Shredder as part of a process to begin his agenda of taking over the living world and had Shredder destroy the amulet to cement his dominion. However, the amulet was restored and Kavaxas is forced to send his spectral force back before being dragged into the Netherworld by the Zombie Shredder.
- Count Dracula (voiced by Chris Sarandon) is the Lord of the Vampires who is raised from the dead by Savanti Romero himself in "The Crypt of Dracula" where he bites Raphael. According to Savanti Romero, Count Dracula originated in the Netherworld. In "Monsters Among Us!", he is staked by Michelangelo.
- Pharaoh (voiced by Grant Moninger) is the mummy of an unnamed Pharaoh that was accidentally awoken by the Ninja Turtles and Renet. He was recruited to the side of Savanti Romero and Count Dracula.
- Vulko (voiced by Dimitri Diatchenko) is a Romani traveler who suffers from Lycanthropy and turns into a werewolf. His werewolf form was swayed to the side of Savanti Romero and Count Dracula. In "The Crypt of Dracula", it is revealed that Vulko has a daughter named Esmeralda.
- 80s Shredder (voiced by Kevin Michael Richardson) is the 1980s counterpart of Shredder and an ally of Krang. He debuts in the Season 5 episodes "Wanted: Bebop and Rocksteady", "The Foot Walks Again", and "The Big Blowout" when he and Krang recruit the present counterparts of Bebop and Rocksteady. He is first mentioned by the 1987s Turtles when a Kraathatrogon comes into their world.
  - 80s Bebop and 80s Rocksteady (voiced by Barry Gordon and Cam Clarke) are the 1980s versions of Bebop and Rocksteady who are 1980s Shredder's henchmen. When Shredder and Krang traveled to the 2012 reality, Bebop and Rocksteady were accidentally left behind.
  - The 80s Foot Soldiers are robot ninjas who serve as the foot soldiers of 1980s Shredder.
- Jei (voiced by Keone Young) is an anthropomorphic gray wolf of mighty strength and abilities, and the archenemy of Miyamoto Usagi. He claims to be the "Blade of the Gods". Jei carries a mystic wooden staff of immense power and is a highly skilled swordsman. He also has great knowledge of Japanese dark magic and arcane lore. Jei was the one who had called the Turtles from their dimension to use their incredibly extensive ninjitsu skills to put an end to Usagi. He was able to trick them by posing as a blind wolf.
- Sumo Kuma (voiced by Cary-Hiroyuki Tagawa) is an anthropomorphic brown bear who is the leader of the Ronin that attacked Akemi's village on Jei's behalf. He is later revealed to have been mind-controlled by Jei.
  - Sumo Kuma's Ronin (voiced by Keone Young and Tohoru Masamune) is a group of unnamed canine ronin that work for Sumo Kuma.
- Jorōgumo (voiced by Brittany Ishibashi) is a spider Yokai that attacks Miyamoto Usagi, Kintaro, and the Turtles.

== Alien species ==
In addition to the Kraang, there are many other alien species throughout the show that are listed in alphabetical order:

=== Aeons ===
The Aeons is an ancient alien race of benevolent, ethereal beings that hail from the planet Zalvadal, a world of vast, beautiful gardens and tranquility that contains all of the sacred knowledge in the cosmos. They were the very first extraterrestrials to evolve into higher beings of mighty power. The very source of all their strength is a mighty crystallized artifact called the Sol Star, containing the very essence of power and life itself. Once hidden away, the entire world turned pure evil and corrupted the Aeons as well. When April had restored the world to its former state and splendor by placing the mystical Sol Star in its rightful place, the grateful Aeons gladly gave her a small fragment of it, assuring her that it would grant her luck and great power. However, they were not have been aware of how the Sol Star fragment was gradually corrupting April to the point of insanity, in addition to further developing and magnifying most of her psionic abilities to tremendous levels as well as awakening an evil Aeon named Za-Naron.

Among the known Aeons are:

- The First Seven is the very first Aeons to exist on planet Zalvadal. After one hundred millennia, their physical selves had disintegrated under unexplained circumstances. After which, each of their spirits was placed into the mystical Sol Star to exist for eternity.
  - Za-Naron (voiced by Mae Whitman via speaking through April) is a supremely powerful and dangerous female Aeon whose spirit dwelled within the mystical Sol Star fragment that was worn by April for most of Season 4. After all of April's psionic abilities are immeasurably magnified to uncontrollable levels, it suddenly awakens and releases Za-Naron to the point of taking partial or full possession of April's mind and body. Believing that Earth is corrupted, she sought to wipe out humanity to save the planet.

=== Daagon ===
The Daagon is a race of aquatic fish-like aliens that reside in the cosmic ocean of Varuna, a liquid nebula over which they rule. They are one of the few aliens that served as the guardians of the Heart of Darkness fragments.

Among the known Daagon are:

- Hiidrala (voiced by Lucy Lawless) is the queen of the Daagon with tentacled arms and hair. She is the only one to have complete power over the Cthugga.
- Daagon Soldiers are the foot soldiers of the Daagon Empire. Michelangelo nicknamed them "Merdudes".

=== Neutrinos ===
In this show, the Neutrinos are a race of microscopic aliens.

Among the known Neutrinos are:

- Neutrino Mercenaries (both voiced by Clancy Brown) are a trio of Neutrinos who were sent by Bellybomb to infiltrate Mikey's mind for plans for the Heart of Darkness to give to Lord Dregg but were defeated by the other Turtles after they were sent into Mikey's mind. After returning to the real world, they tried to escape only to be grabbed by Mikey who then squished them with his foot.

=== Salamandrians ===
The Salamandrians are a race of humanoid aliens that resemble newts and salamanders. For some unknown reason, the Salamandrians are the enemies of the Triceraton Empire.

Besides K'Vathrak, among the known Salamandrians are:

- Commander G'Throkka / Sal Commander (voiced by Keith David) is a Salamandrian with a mechanical left eye and an armored tail who is the commander of the Salamandrian Air Force. He lost his original left eye in an earlier battle with K'Vathrak.
- Lt. Y'Gythgba / Mona Lisa (voiced by Zelda Williams) is an alien blue-spotted salamander-type Salamandrian and galactic warrior, she is the love interest and girlfriend of Raphael who joined the team on his recommendation to be closer to him after finally defeating Lord Dregg.
- General R'Kavaka (voiced by Nolan North) is a Salamandrian general that Sal Commander and Mona Lisa report to.

=== Utroms ===
The Utroms are the peaceful counterparts of the Kraang who resisted Kraang Prime's mind control. The Utroms are ruled by the Utrom High Council who are named after chess pieces. They pilot blue-colored Karaangdroids, called Utromdroids.

Among the known Utroms are:

- Bishop (voiced by Nolan North) is a member of the Utrom's ruling council, the original designer of the Kraang exo-bodies, and Kraang Subprime's brother who broke the Utrom vow of non-involvement in Earth affairs by contacting the Turtles to warn them of the Technodrome's rise from the sea and of the imminent arrival of the Triceraton armada. In the course of the series he continually aids the Turtles against the Kraang's plots and even seeks to assist the Earth Protection Force in bolstering their defense arsenal with alien technology, though his good intentions fall apart due to the paranoia of the EPF's leader, General Griffin. He is loosely based on Agent Bishop, a character and antagonist of the Turtles from the 2003 series.
- Queen (voiced by Cassandra Peterson) is a Utrom who is a member of the Utrom High Council. She pilots a recolored version of Mrs. Campbell and wears a tiara in her base Utrom form.
- Rook (voiced by Kate Micucci) is a Utrom who is a member of the Utrom High Council. She pilots a recolored version of Irma Langinstein, revealed to be the creator of the droid model with a grudge against Kraang Subprime for stealing her design.
- Pawn (voiced by Nolan North) is a Utrom who is a member of the Utrom High Council and speaks with a French accent. He pilots a Utrom-colored Kraangdroid identical to those used by most of the Utrom, with the addition of a curly mustache.

=== Alien creatures ===
The following alien creatures are listed in order of appearance:

- Varuna Sea Monster is an unnamed alien sea creature resembling the Loch Ness Monster that comes from the cosmic ocean of Varuna. One Varuna Sea Monster was tamed by the Kraang and acts as an underwater guardian for the Kraang's underwater bases. When in Varuna, they serve as a mode of transportation for the Daagon.
- The Ice Dragons are a race of monitor lizard-resembling ice monsters that live on one of the moons of Thalos 3.
- Spasmosaurus is a large tentacled alien monster with numerous eyes and four mouths filled with sharp teeth. The Turtles faced it in the Triceraton Arena and defeated it by hitting the white spot which is its weak spot. The Spasmosaurus originates from the Mirage Comics and also had an appearance in the 2003 series.
- Cthugga is a large tentacled blue whale-like sea monster that obeys the orders of Hiidrala. Like Tokka, Cthugga is one of the six known Cosmic Monsters.
- Xaxx Bees are a race of alien bees that are found on Sectoid 1.
- Scorpinoid is an alien giant scorpion on Sectoid 1 that is Lord Dregg's favorite pet.
- Tokka is a kaiju-sized turtle-shaped monster who is one of the six known Cosmic Monsters alongside Cthugga and happens to be both male and female, a hermaphrodite. It resides on the planet Magdomar at the end of the known universe and is the parent of the alien turtle that Raphael later adopted as Chompy Picasso. Besides breathing fire, Tokka can also fly.

== Supporting characters ==
- Tang Shen (voiced by Minae Noji) is the late, loving wife of Hamato Yoshi (now Splinter) and late mother of Karai whose birth name is Miwa. She was a young woman of mainly Japanese ancestry but was one-quarter Chinese through her grandfather. Although she was raised in Fukuoka, Japan, she eventually moved to Tokyo to be closer to her lover/husband Yoshi. Although deceased, she is forever remembered via photographs that her husband and teenage daughter carry separately, and in several memories of Splinter throughout all five seasons. In "Tale of the Yokai", as the Turtles had traveled sixteen years into Tokyo's past, she was shown alive until she was again unintentionally killed by the vengeful blades of Oroku Saki and left to perish in the inferno of the Dojo. She believed that ninjas no longer had a place in the modern world and did not want her daughter to follow in the footsteps of her father.
- Dr. Kirby O'Neil (voiced by Keith Silverstein) is an intelligent physiologist of Irish descent. He is April's father and a supporting character in the show. He encountered the Turtles who attempted and failed to rescue him and his daughter from the Kraang. He remained a prisoner of the Kraang for most of the first season. In earlier episodes of Season Two, he was mutated into a giant bat. Fortunately, he was eventually cured by Donatello's retro-mutagen. During the Kraang invasion, he would briefly be mutated into a Kraang/human mutant before being among those restored to normal by the Turtles
- Mrs. O'Neil (voiced by Renae Jacobs) is the long-lost wife of Kirby O'Neil and April's late mother. One decade prior to the show, she was abducted and experimented on by the Kraang before April was born six years later. Her human DNA was fused with that of a Kraang creature, which had only her memories. She had light blonde waist-length hair and green eyes. Her first name and maiden name are unknown. It was because she was experimented on by the Kraang, that April inherited her psychic abilities as a human/Kraang mutant. The real Mrs. O'Neil's whereabouts and life status are unknown.
- Metalhead is an evolved autonomous and sentient turtle-robot created by Donatello using Kraang technology, which was re-engineered from a Kraangdroid. He is armed with a variety of weapons at his disposal. He can shoot pale blue lasers long-range, and even breathe fire. At one point, his artificial intelligence and M.A.S were upgraded, evolving him even further to the point of "rebelling" against his inventor. He had allowed himself to be overpowered by the Kraang to open the portal to give the Turtles time to escape. Only his head remained behind.
- Carlos Chang O'Brien Gambe (voiced by Jim Meskimen) is a local news reporter on Channel 6 replacing the young adult April O'Neil of the 1987 series.
- Mr. Murakami-san (voiced by Sab Shimono) is a blind Japanese chef who runs a noodle shop.
- Joan Grody (voiced by Kari Wahlgren) is the hostess of a TV show called "Grody to the Max" on Channel 6. In "The Noxious Avenger", Joan Grody later reports on the heroic antics of Muckman and nearly sees the Turtles. By Muckman's latest appearance, he told Joan Grody that the "Turtles" were humans dressed as turtles like how the Pulverizer had operated.
- 1980s Teenage Mutant Ninja Turtles - While in a room full of portals, Donatello, April O'Neil, and Casey Jones see their 1980s counterparts. In the final scene, the 1980s Teenage Mutant Ninja Turtles see a Kraathatrogon emerge in Manhattan and engage it. In "Trans-Dimensional Turtles", they bring the 2012 Turtles to their dimension to stop Krang and Kraang Subprime. In Wanted: Bebop & Rocksteady, The Foot Walks Again and The Big Blowout, they team up with the 2012 Turtles again, along with April, Casey, Karai, Shinigami, and the Mighty Mutanimals to stop Bebop and Rocksteady (Anton Zeck and Ivan Steranko), Krang and 1987 Shredder.
  - 80s Leonardo (voiced by Cam Clarke) is the 1980s counterpart of Leonardo.
  - 80s Donatello (voiced by Barry Gordon) is the 1980s counterpart of Donatello.
  - 80s Raphael (voiced by Rob Paulsen) is the 1980s counterpart of Raphael
  - 80s Michelangelo (voiced by Townsend Coleman) is the 1980s counterpart of Michelangelo.
- Malcolm Milton / Sir Malachi (voiced by Paul Reubens) was a boy who played a LARP game called "Mazes & Mutants" (a parody of "Dungeons & Dragons"). He was mutated into a mutant wood sparrow upon being hit by a mutagen canister while feeding some wood sparrows and developed illusion-based abilities.
- Earth Protection Force is a secret unit created to handle extraterrestrial and inter-dimensional threats.
  - General Griffin (voiced by Jim Meskimen) is a high-ranking member of the Earth Protection Force.
  - Earth Protection Force Soldiers (Various Voices) are the foot soldiers of the Earth Protection Force.
- April's Great-Grandfather is the unnamed maternal great-grandfather of April (Mrs. O'Neil's grandfather) who had built the O'Neil farm many decades ago and inadvertently awakened the Kraang lying dormant underneath. This led to the Kraang constantly targeting the O'Neil family to experiment on them.
- The Deer Spirit is a spirit of nature residing in the woods of Northampton in Upstate New York. It has two forms: a normal white-tailed deer form and a humanoid white-tailed deer form.
- Alopex (voiced by Minae Noji) is a Japanese girl who was mutated into a humanoid red fox by the Kraang several decades ago. She is a master kunoichi with the abilities of superhuman speed, superhuman reflexes, and superhuman agility. She is the younger sister of Tiger Claw (Takeshi), but had turned on him and cut his tail off in resentment of her mutation and subsequent life as a murderer, where their parents were one of his victims. This led to the siblings to seek revenge on each other. In her debut episode "The Tale of Tiger Claw", Alopex maims Tiger Claw further by cutting off half of Tiger Claw's right arm. She is based on the character Alopex from the IDW comic series, but her genetic template is a red fox instead of an arctic fox and she is the first female adult mutant to appear in the series.
- The Tanuki are a group of mischievous raccoon dogs Yōkai that Miyamoto Usagi and the Turtles encounter. They left the group alone when Usagi left a food offering to them. The Tanuki later repaid them by helping the group get away from Jorogumo.
- Frankenstein's Monster (voiced by Grant Moninger) is an undead simulacrum created by Victor Frankenstein and Raphael. After his creation, Frankenstein's Monster was mind-controlled by Count Dracula until Michelangelo freed him from mind control. Renet took Frankenstein's Monster to the future to be more appreciated.

== TV show characters ==
The following characters appear in the TV shows that are watched by the Turtles in each season:

=== Space Heroes characters ===
Space Heroes is a fictional animated science fiction TV series that is Leonardo's favorite show in Season 1. It is a parody of Star Trek and Star Trek: The Animated Series.

- Captain Ryan (voiced by Brian Bloom) is the main hero and captain of a spacecraft crew in Space Heroes.
- Crankshaw (voiced by Scott Menville) is a young ensign whom Captain Ryan smacks every time he panics.
- Dr. Mindstrong (voiced by Ben Cross) is an alien scientist.
- Commander Grundch (voiced by Nolan North) is the second-in-command of Captain Ryan.
- Rodriguez (voiced by Greg Cipes) and "That Other Guy" (voiced by Rob Paulsen) are two human and green-skinned alien crew members who were chosen by Captain Ryan for a suicide land mission and get immediately disintegrated upon landing just to provide Captain Ryan und Crankshaw with some cover.
- Trumplets are small, cute, and furry, yet annoying creatures.
- Celestial (voiced by Anna Graves) is a minor character who tries to seduce Captain Ryan into giving her the secret codes only for Captain Ryan to disintegrate her. Captain Ryan keeps her boots as a memento.
- Hypnotica is an alien that brainwashed Captain Ryan into thinking it was a beautiful woman.
- Cortexicons are a race of strange mind-controlling aliens. One of them took control of Dr. Mindstrong in one episode.
- Digesters are a race of large, orange, blob-like creatures (although one was shown) that attacked a landing party sent by Captain Ryan. It is later heard eating the trio and belches.

=== Super Robo Mecha Force Five characters ===
Super Robo Mecha Force Five is a 1980s anime show that was discovered by Michelangelo in Season 2. It is also called "SRMFF!" for short. It is a parody of shows like Voltron: Defender of the Universe, Tranzor Z, and Voltes V.

- Captain Dash Coolstar (voiced by Brian Bloom) is the leader of the Super Robo Mecha Force Five and main character of the "Super Robo Mecha Force Five" anime who controls the torso of the Mighty Super Robo Mecha.
- Dr. Blip (voiced by Scott Menville) is the scientist of the team who built the robot and controls the right leg. Similar to Crankshaw, Dr. Blip gets smacked by Captain Dash Coolstar every time he panics.
- Squeakums is an alien monkey and animal sidekick of the team who pilots the right arm.
- Lunk (voiced by Nolan North) is the hot-tempered member who controls the left arm.
- Princess (voiced by Mae Whitman) is the female member who pilots the left leg. She is the princess of an unnamed planet and Dr. Blip has a crush on her.
- General Unsura (voiced by Kevin Michael Richardson) is a villain who once took control of the Mighty Super Robo Mecha.
- Mind Master (voiced by Nolan North) is a villain who once tried to fill Captain Coolstar's mind with madness.
- Skele-Lord (voiced by Josh Peck) is a skeleton-like villain who was defeated by SRMFF when they stomped on him. He later came back with a giant mecha of his own.
- Cyberoid X (voiced by Brian Bloom) is a minor villain who once infiltrated SRMFF's headquarters.
- Kill Beast Bots are robotic yellow beasts from the planet Sevenorth.
- Giant Space Squid is an alien giant squid that was destroyed by SRMFF.
- Hydra Beast is a three-headed dragon-like alien.

=== Crognard the Barbarian characters ===
Crognard the Barbarian is Michelangelo's new favorite show since they moved to April's old farm in Season 3. It is a parody of shows like Thundarr the Barbarian and He-Man and the Masters of the Universe while the name is derivative of Conan the Barbarian.

- Crognard (voiced by Brian Bloom) is a barbarian who is the main character.
- Wizardess (voiced by Mae Whitman) is the magic-wielding ally of Crognard.
- Graah (voiced by Nolan North) is the monstrous ally of Crognard.
- Spooch (voiced by Scott Menville) is a small floating fish-like creature who is Crognard's ally.
- Mounts are various creatures that are used as mounts for the heroes.
  - Go-lek is Crognard's pet lizard steed.
  - Horses are the steeds of Wizardess and Graah
  - Reptilian Steeds are three dinosaur-like creatures that the heroes once used to chase Muurg.
- Slug People are a race of slug-like creatures.
  - "Slug People Leader" (voiced by Nolan North) is the supposed leader of the Slug People.
- Giant Mountain Demon is a giant mountain-sized demon that swallowed Wizardess, but is defeated by Crognard.
- Muurg (voiced by Brian Bloom) is an evil horned centaur who stole the Mystic Jewel of Koweewah.
- Megalord Zarrik (voiced by Jim Meskimen) is a villain who can change faces.
- Grom and Grum (voiced by Fred Tatasciore and J.B. Smoove) are a two-headed giant ogre with a blue right side named Grum and a purple left side named Grom that share the same body and are considered brothers.
- Gorrick Army are an army of muscular orc-like creatures that carrying various weapons.
- Malfidor (voiced by Tom Kenny) is a mind-controlling wizard.
- Rock Giant is a giant made of rock. Crognard entered its body through its rear end and destroyed it from within.
- Dread Dragon Wigglepuss is a large five-headed dragon (the heads are colored red, green, blue, black, and white) from the Gray Northern Middle Mountains of Mooreless. It was Crognard's final opponent in the final episode of "Crognard the Barbarian" where it ended up eating Crognard and spitting out his crown. Dread Dragon Wigglepuss' design is based on Tiamat from the Dungeons & Dragons franchise.

=== Chris Bradford's 2 Ruff Krew characters ===
Chris Bradford's 2 Ruff Krew is a fictional 1980s cartoon starring a metafictional version of Rahzar in his former human form of Chris Bradford where its broadcast signals are picked up by the Ulixes in Season 4. It is a parody of Karate Kommandos, Mister T, Rambo: The Force of Freedom and The A-Team.

- Chris Bradford (voiced by Clancy Brown) is the metafictional counterpart of Chris Bradford.
- Lil' Rineo (voiced by Greg Cipes) is a pre-teen weapons expert who is an ally of Chris Bradford.
- Master C (voiced by Kevin Michael Richardson) is a wrestler ally of Chris Bradford.
- Sumo Glen (voiced by Rob Paulsen) is a sumo wrestler ally of Chris Bradford.
- Cho-Cho is Chris Bradford's pet monkey.
- Fake Master (voiced by Kevin Michael Richardson) is an evil master of disguises who once posed as Chris Bradford's girlfriend Felicia (voiced by Mae Whitman) for the last three years.
- Evil Ninja is a ninja that works with Fake Master.
- Micro Chip (voiced by Rob Paulsen) is a dwarfish yet strong villain.
- Captain Reptile (voiced by Seth Green) is a lizard man villain.
- Destroyo (voiced by Kevin Michael Richardson) is a masked villain who once unleashed Killer Dolphins on Chris Bradford.
  - Killer Dolphins are Destroyo's pet cyborg bottlenose dolphins.
- Ninja Commander (voiced by Eric Bauza in the first appearance and Seth Green in the second appearance) is a communist ninja that Chris Bradford fought. Rahzar commented that the episode featuring Chris Bradford fighting Ninja Commander was one of the top 5 best episodes on the show's fan sites.
- Yellow Monster is an unnamed shapeshifting giant monster that poses as Lil' Rineo and Ninja Commander. He fought Chris Bradford on top of a roof until Chris Bradford managed to kick him off the building to the streets below. His appearance is a reference to the mutant form of Carter, a friend of the Turtles featured in the 1987 cartoon series.

=== Space Heroes: The Next Generation characters ===
Space Heroes: The Next Generation is the sequel to Space Heroes whose tapes were found by Michelangelo in season 5. This becomes Leonardo's latest favorite show. It is stated by Donatello that most of the tapes for this show were used as landfill because it was deemed "too disturbing". The series is a parody of Star Trek: The Animated Series and Star Trek: The Next Generation.

- Captain Ryan (voiced by Brian Bloom) is older, bald, and overweight.
- Crankshaw Jr. (voiced by Scott Menville) is the son of Crankshaw who has his father's panicking problem and is also slapped by Captain Ryan.
- Scronus is the chief engineer of Captain Ryan's ship.
- Nefrini are an alien race.
  - Nefrini Leader (voiced by Scott Menville) is the leader of the Nefrini ship that confronts Captain Ryan who wants to know why the Confederation is unfairly taxing the Nefrini's trade routes.
- Z (voiced by Peter Lurie) is a tentacled brain-like alien on an M. C. Escher-type world.
- Shahana is a female alien from the planet Regal 4 who was Captain Ryan's love interest until she was eaten by an alien beast.
- Dr. Mindstrong (voiced by Dave B. Mitchell) is a former crew member of Captain Ryan who was thought dead.
- Cybergs are a race of alien robots.
  - Cyberg Leader (voiced by Scott Menville) is the leader of the Cybergs.
- Mr. Gigabyte (voiced by Scott Menville)
- Evil Captain Ryan (voiced by Brian Bloom) is a version of Captain Ryan from a mirror dimension.
- Evil Crankshaw Jr. (voiced by Scott Menville) is a version of Crankshaw Jr. from a mirror dimension.
