= Marc Lanteigne =

Canadian political scientist

Academic background
- Education: McGill University
- Thesis: Doorways and Mirrors: Chinese Power and International Institutions (2002)

Academic work
- Discipline: Political science; International relations
- Sub-discipline: Foreign policy of China; Arctic policy of China

Marc Edouard Lanteigne (Chinese: 林晏; born 1971) is a Canadian political scientist originally from Montréal. He is a professor of Political Science at the Arctic University of Norway, Tromsø, teaching international relations (IR), Chinese and East Asian politics and foreign policy, comparative politics, security studies and comparative political economy and politics of finance. Prior to that, Lanteigne was a Senior Research Associate at Department of East Asian Studies, Ruhr University Bochum, and Senior Lecturer at the Centre for Defence and Security Studies (CDSS) at Massey University in Auckland. He is Editor-in-Chief of an Arctic news website Over the Circle, a former part-time lecturer at Peking University, an adjunct researcher at the Centre for Arctic Studies at the University of Iceland, Reykjavík, an adjunct lecturer at Ilisimatusarfik - University of Greenland, Nuuk, and a member of the board of the UK-based Polar Research and Policy Initiative (PRPI). He has researched extensively in East Asia and Oceania, and examines Arctic politics and security policies as part of his current research.

== Academic career ==
Lanteigne received his MA and PhD from McGill University in 1994 and 2002. He researches in and writes about China's regional and international relations, including a textbook entitled Chinese Foreign Policy: An Introduction, as well as economic security, free trade politics, and energy issues. He has written for The New Humanitarian and Institute for Security & Development Policy. He is the co-editor of the Routledge Handbook of Arctic Security, Nordic-China Diplomacy, and China’s Evolving Approach to Peacekeeping.

Between September 2014 and October 2016, Lanteigne was Senior Research Fellow at the Norwegian Institute of International Affairs (NUPI), researching Chinese and comparative Northeast Asian politics and foreign policy, as well as Asia-Arctic relations, international political economy and institution-building. He has previously taught at Dalhousie University, Halifax, Canada (2002–2004), McGill University (2004–2006), the University of St. Andrews, Scotland (2006–2010) and Victoria University of Wellington, New Zealand (2010–2014). He has also taught and co-taught politics courses in Brunei, China, Iceland, and Vietnam.

== Works ==
=== Monographs ===
- China and International Institutions: Alternate Paths to Global Power (2005)
- Chinese Foreign Policy: An Introduction (2009, 2013, 2015, 2019)

=== Edited books ===
- The Chinese Party-State in the 21st Century: Adaptation and the Reinvention of Legitimacy (2008) with André Laliberté
- China’s Evolving Approach to Peacekeeping (2014) with Miwa Hirono
- Nordic-China Diplomacy (2017) with Wrenn Yennie Lindgren and Bjørnar Sverdrup-Thygeson
- Routledge Handbook of Arctic Security (2022)
