= Miwa =

- Gender: female

Origin
- Origin: Japanese
- Meaning: different meanings depending on the kanji used

Other names
- Related names: Miwako

Miwa (みわ, ミワ) is a feminine Japanese given name which can also be used as a surname.

== Written forms ==
Miwa can be written using different kanji characters and can mean:

- 三和 "three, harmony"
- 三輪 "three, wheel/ring"
- 美和 "beauty, harmony"
- 美羽 "beauty, feather"
- 美輪 "beauty, wheel/ring"
- 美環 "beauty, ring; circle; loop"

The given name can also be written in hiragana or katakana.

== People ==
with the given name Miwa

- Miwa (singer) (born 1990), Japanese singer-songwriter
- Miwa Asao (浅尾 美和; born 1986), Japanese beach volleyball player
- Miwa Fukuhara (福原 美和; born 1944), Japanese figure skater
- Miwa Harimoto (張本 美和; born 2008), Japanese table tennis player
- Miwa Hirono (廣野 美和), Japanese political scientist and scholar
- Miwa Kuribayashi (栗林 未和; born 1998), Japanese women's basketball player
- Miwa Matsumoto (松本 美和; born 1971), Japanese voice actress
- Miwa Morikawa (森川 美和; born 1999), Japanese freestyle wrestler
- Miwa Nishikawa (西川 美和; born 1974), Japanese director and screenwriter
- Miwa Oshiro (大城 美和; born 1983), Japanese gravure idol, model and actress
- Miwa Ota (太田 美和; born 1968), Japanese cross-country skier
- Miwa Sasagawa (笹川 美和; born 1983), Japanese singer-songwriter
- Miwa Sasaki (佐々木 美和; born 1995), Japanese professional footballer
- Miwa Sato (里 美和; born 1966), Japanese female professional wrestler
- Miwa Takada (高田 美和; born 1947), Japanese film, TV and stage actress
- Miwa Tanaka (田中 美和; born 1998), Japanese professional footballer
- Miwa Ueda (上田 美和), Japanese manga artist
- Miwa Yanagi (やなぎ みわ; born 1967), Japanese photographic artist
- Miwa Yasuda (安田 美和; born 1977), Japanese voice actress
- Miwa Yonetsu (米津 美和; born 1979), Japanese football player
- Miwa Yoshida (吉田 美和; born 1965), Japanese musician, and the lead singer for the band Dreams Come True

with the surname Miwa

- Akihiro Miwa (美輪 明宏; born 1935), Japanese singer, actor, director, composer, author and drag queen
- Asumi Miwa (三輪 明日美; born 1982), Japanese actress
- Hideki Miwa (三和 英樹; born 1969), Japanese former cyclist
- Hiroshi Miwa (三輪 宏; born 1940), Japanese field hockey player
- Katsue Miwa (三輪 勝恵; 1943–2024), Japanese voice actress
- Masayoshi Miwa (三輪 正義; born 1984), Japanese professional baseball player
- Sadahiro Miwa (三輪 定広; 1941–2003), Japanese weightlifter
- Shigeyoshi Miwa (三輪 茂義; 1892–1959), Japanese admiral in the Imperial Japanese Navy
- Shirow Miwa (三輪 士郎; born 1978), Japanese manga artist and illustrator
- Sumio Miwa (三輪 寿美雄; born 1932), Japanese racewalker
- Tadafumi Miwa (三輪 忠文; born 1961), Japanese modern pentathlete
- Takashi Miwa (三輪 隆; born 1969), Japanese professional baseball player
- Tetsuji Miwa (三輪 哲二; born 1949), Japanese mathematician
- Tetsuya Miwa (三輪 徹也; born 1967), Japanese guitarist of the rock band Spitz
- Yoko Miwa (born 1970), Japanese jazz pianist

== Fictional characters ==
with the given name Miwa

- Miwa Hamato, a recurring character in the 2012 of Teenage Mutant Ninja Turtles. She is the biological daughter of Hamato Yoshi and the late Tang Shen, but was abducted by the Shredder as an infant and was renamed Karai.
- Miwa Tamashiro (美和), a character in the anime series Kotetsushin Jeeg
- Miwa Isono, a character in the manga series MPD Psycho
- Miwa Kageyama (美羽), the sister of Tobio Kageyama from the anime and manga series Haikyū!!
- Miwa Kurushima (美和), a character in the manga series Bartender (manga)
- Miwa Yamada (山田 ミワ), a main character in Chi's Sweet Home

With the surname Miwa

- Satoshi Miwa (三輪), a character in the manga and anime Marmalade Boy
- Sakamori Miwa (三輪), a character in the anime series Tōshō Daimos
- Ichigen Miwa (三輪 一言), a character in the anime series K
- Shinobu Miwa (三輪), a character in the anime, manga, and novel series RahXephon
- Konekomaru Miwa (三輪), a character in Blue Exorcist
- Kasumi Miwa (三輪霞), a character in Jujutsu Kaisen
- Taishi Miwa (三和 タイシ), a character in Cardfight!! Vanguard
