= Miwa (disambiguation) =

Miwa is both a Japanese given name and a surname.

Miwa may also refer to:

== Place ==
- Miwa, Aichi (美和町), Japan
- Miwa, Fukuoka (三輪町), Japan
- Miwa, Hiroshima (三和町), Japan
- Miwa, Kyoto (三和町), Japan
- Miwa, Yamaguchi (美和町), Japan

== Other uses ==
- Miwa people, an Indigenous Australian people
- Miwa Station, a train station in Nara Prefecture, Japan
- Mount Miwa, a mountain located in Nara Prefecture, Japan
- 8855 Miwa, a Main-belt Asteroid
