= Hirono =

Hirono may refer to:

== People ==
- Hirono (surname), a Japanese surname
- Mazie Hirono, current Democratic US Senator from the state of Hawaii.

== Places ==
- Hirono, Fukushima, Japan
- Hirono, Iwate, Japan
- Hirono Station (Fukushima), a stop on the West Japan Railway's Fukuchiyama Line
- Hirono Station (Hyogo), a stop on the Kobe Electric Railway's Sanda Line
- Hirono Power Station, a fossil-fuel power station operated by Tepco
