= List of Teenage Mutant Ninja Turtles (2012 TV series) episodes =

The 2012 Teenage Mutant Ninja Turtles series is an American animated television series based on the eponymous characters. It aired on Nickelodeon in the United States from September 28, 2012, to November 12, 2017.

== Series overview ==
Season	Episodes	Originally released	
Season	Episodes	First released	Last released
1	26	September 28, 2012	August 8, 2013
2	26	October 12, 2013	September 26, 2014
3	26	October 3, 2014	September 27, 2015
4	26	October 25, 2015	February 26, 2017
5	20	March 19, 2017	November 12, 2017

== Episodes ==
=== Season 1 (2012–13) ===
The episodes aired with their working titles outside North America.

No. overall	No. in season	Title	Directed by	Written by	Storyboarded by	Original release date	Prod. code	U.S. viewers (millions)
1	1	"Rise of the Turtles"	Michael Chang	Joshua Sternin and J. R. Ventimilia	Adam Lucas, Ciro Nieli and Luke Weber	September 28, 2012	101	2.30
2	2	"Rise of the Turtles"	Alan Wan	Joshua Sternin and J. R. Ventimilia	Christian Lignan and Byron Penaranda	September 29, 2012	102	3.92
3	3	"Turtle Temper"	Alan Wan	Jeremy Shipp	Byron Penaranda and Christian Lignan	October 6, 2012	103	3.25
4	4	"New Friend, Old Enemy"	Juan Jose Meza-Leon	Joshua Hamilton	Chong Lee, Ciro Nieli, Luke Weber and Sheldon Vella	October 13, 2012	104	2.80
5	5	"I Think His Name Is Baxter Stockman"	Michael Chang and Ciro Nieli	Joshua Sternin and J. R. Ventimilia	Irineo Maramba, Ben Jones, Alan Wan, Jake Castorena and Luke Weber	October 20, 2012	105	3.40
6	6	"Metalhead"	Juan Jose Meza-Leon	Tom Alvarado	Chong Lee and Sheldon Vella	October 27, 2012	106	3.61
7	7	"Monkey Brains"	Alan Wan	Russ Carney and Ron Corcillo	Christian Lignan and Byron Penaranda	November 3, 2012	107	3.69
8	8	"Never Say Xever"	Michael Chang	Kenny Byerly	Adam Lucas and Luke Weber	November 10, 2012	108	2.92
9	9	"The Gauntlet"	Juan Jose Meza-Leon	Joshua Sternin and J. R. Ventimilia	Chong Suk Lee, Ciro Nieli and Sheldon Vella	November 17, 2012	109	2.80
10	10	"Panic in the Sewers"	Alan Wan	Jeremy Shipp	Michael Fong and Rie Koga	November 24, 2012	110	2.92
11	11	"Mousers Attack!"	Michael Chang	Kenny Byerly	Adam Lucas and Byron Penaranda	December 8, 2012	111	3.37
12	12	"It Came from the Depths"	Juan Jose Meza-Leon	Russ Carney and Ron Corcillo	Chong Suk Lee and Sheldon Vella	December 15, 2012	112	3.46
13	13	"I, Monster"	Michael Chang	Jase Ricci	Adam Lucas and Byron Penaranda	January 25, 2013	113	2.61
14	14	"New Girl in Town"	Alan Wan	Jeremy Shipp	Michael Fong and Rie Koga	February 1, 2013	114	2.33
15	15	"The Alien Agenda"	Juan Jose Meza-Leon	Kenny Byerly	Chong Suk Lee and Sheldon Vella	February 8, 2013	115	2.42
16	16	"The Pulverizer"	Alan Wan	Russ Carney and Ron Corcillo	Miki Brewster, Michael Fong and Rie Koga	February 15, 2013	116	2.55
17	17	"TCRI"	Michael Chang	Joshua Sternin and J. R. Ventimilia	Adam Lucas, Byron Penaranda and Sean Song	March 1, 2013	117	2.15
18	18	"Cockroach Terminator"	Juan Jose Meza-Leon	Jeremy Shipp	Chong Suk Lee and Sheldon Vella	March 15, 2013	118	2.19
19	19	"Baxter's Gambit"	Alan Wan	Jase Ricci	Michael Fong and Rie Koga	April 5, 2013	119	2.30
20	20	"Enemy of My Enemy"	Michael Chang	Kenny Byerly	Adam Lucas and Sean Song	April 12, 2013	120	2.31
21	21	"Karai's Vendetta"	Juan Jose Meza-Leon and Sebastian Montes	Russ Carney and Ron Corcillo	Chong Suk Lee and Sheldon Vella	April 27, 2013	121	3.05
22	22	"The Pulverizer Returns!"	Alan Wan	Jeremy Shipp	Michael Fong and Rie Koga	May 11, 2013	122	2.78
23	23	"Parasitica"	Michael Chang	Pete Goldfinger	Adam Lucas and Sean Song	July 20, 2013	123	2.19
24	24	"Operation: Break Out"	Michael Chang	Jase Ricci	Adam Lucas and Sean Song	July 27, 2013	124	2.15
25	25	"Showdown"	Juan Jose Meza-Leon and Sebastian Montes	Joshua Sternin and J. R. Ventimilia	Chong Suk Lee and Sheldon Vella	August 8, 2013	125	3.14
26	26	"Showdown"	Alan Wan	Joshua Sternin and J. R. Ventimilia	Michael Fong and Rie Koga	August 8, 2013	126	3.14

=== Season 2 (2013–14) ===
No. overall	No. in season	Title	Directed by	Written by	Storyboarded by	Original release date	Prod. code	US viewers (millions)
27	1	"The Mutation Situation"	Sebastian Montes and Ciro Nieli	Brandon Auman	Miki Brewster, Chong Suk Lee and Sheldon Vella	October 12, 2013	201	2.68
28	2	"Follow the Leader"	Alan Wan	Eugene Son	Kristafer Anka, Michael Fong and Rie Koga	November 2, 2013	202	2.49
29	3	"Invasion of the Squirrelanoids"	Michael Chang	Todd Garfield	Sung Jin Ahn, Adam Lucas and Ed Tadem	October 19, 2013	203	2.61
30	4	"Mutagen Man Unleashed"	Sebastian Montes	Kevin Burke and Chris "Doc" Wyatt	Miki Brewster, Chong Suk Lee and Sheldon Vella	November 9, 2013	204	2.67
31	5	"Mikey Gets Shellacne"	Alan Wan	Thomas Krajewski	Kristafer Anka, Michael Fong and Rie Koga	November 16, 2013	205	2.67
32	6	"Target: April O'Neil"	Michael Chang	Nicole Dubuc	Adam Lucas, Samuel Montes and Ed Tadem	November 23, 2013	206	2.54
33	7	"Slash and Destroy"	Sebastian Montes	Gavin Hignight	Miki Brewster, Chong Suk Lee and Sheldon Vella	November 30, 2013	207	2.51
34	8	"The Good, the Bad, and Casey Jones"	Michael Chang	Johnny Hartmann	Adam Lucas, Samuel Montes and Ed Tadem	February 2, 2014	208	2.69
35	9	"The Kraang Conspiracy"	Alan Wan	Brandon Auman	Kristafer Anka, Michael Fong and Rie Koga	February 9, 2014	209	2.87
36	10	"Fungus Humungous"	Sebastian Montes	Mark Henry	Miki Brewster, Chong Suk Lee and Sheldon Vella	February 16, 2014	210	2.81
37	11	"Metalhead Rewired"	Alan Wan	Peter Di Cicco	Michael Fong, Rie Koga and LeSean Thomas	February 23, 2014	211	2.66
38	12	"Of Rats and Men"	Sebastian Montes	Todd Garfield	Miki Brewster, Chong Suk Lee and Sheldon Vella	March 2, 2014	212	2.65
39	13	"The Manhattan Project" "Wormquake!"	Michael Chang and Alan Wan	Brandon Auman and John Shirley	Adam Lucas, Samuel Montes, Ed Tadem, Michael Fong, Michah Gunnell and Rie Koga	March 14, 2014	213	2.36
40	14	"The Manhattan Project" "Wormquake!"	Michael Chang and Alan Wan	Brandon Auman and John Shirley	Adam Lucas, Samuel Montes, Ed Tadem, Michael Fong, Michah Gunnell and Rie Koga	March 14, 2014	214	2.36
41	15	"Mazes & Mutants"	Michael Chang	Eugene Son	Adam Lucas, Samuel Montes and Ed Tadem	April 27, 2014	215	2.67
42	16	"The Lonely Mutation of Baxter Stockman"	Sebastian Montes	Brandon Auman	Miki Brewster, Chong Suk Lee and Sheldon Vella	May 4, 2014	216	2.32
43	17	"Newtralized!"	Alan Wan	Gavin Hignight	Michael Fong, Michah Gunnell and Rie Koga	May 11, 2014	217	2.03
44	18	"Pizza Face"	Sebastian Montes	Kevin Burke and Chris "Doc" Wyatt	Miki Brewster, Ben Li and Sheldon Vella	May 18, 2014	218	2.29
45	19	"The Wrath of Tiger Claw"	Michael Chang	Christopher Yost	Adam Lucas, Samuel Montes and Ed Tadem	June 8, 2014	219	2.30
46	20	"The Legend of the Kuro Kabuto"	Alan Wan	Doug Langdale	Michael Fong, Micah Gunnell and Rie Koga	June 15, 2014	220	1.87
47	21	"Plan 10"	Michael Chang	Henry Gilroy	Adam Lucas, Samuel Montes and Ed Tadem	June 22, 2014	221	2.13
48	22	"Vengeance Is Mine"	Sebastian Montes	Peter Di Cicco	Miki Brewster, Ben Li and Sheldon Vella	June 29, 2014	222	2.17
49	23	"A Chinatown Ghost Story"	Alan Wan	Randolph Heard	Michael Fong, Micah Gunnell and Rie Koga	September 12, 2014	223	1.33
50	24	"Into Dimension X!"	Sebastian Montes	Doug Langdale	Miki Brewster, Ben Li and Sheldon Vella	September 19, 2014	224	1.70
51	25	"The Invasion"	Michael Chang and Alan Wan	Brandon Auman and John Shirley	Michael Fong, Micah Gunnell, Rie Koga, Adam Lucas, Samuel Montes and Ed Tadem	September 26, 2014	225	1.63
52	26	"The Invasion"	Michael Chang and Alan Wan	Brandon Auman and John Shirley	Michael Fong, Micah Gunnell, Rie Koga, Adam Lucas, Samuel Montes and Ed Tadem	September 26, 2014	226	1.63

=== Season 3 (2014–15) ===
No. overall	No. in season	Title	Directed by	Written by	Storyboarded by	Original release date	Prod. code	US viewers (millions)
53	1	"Within the Woods"	Sebastian Montes	Brandon Auman	Miki Brewster, Ben Li and Sheldon Vella	October 3, 2014	301	1.42
54	2	"A Foot Too Big"	Michael Chang	Doug Langdale	Adam Lucas, Samuel Montes and Ed Tadem	October 10, 2014	302	1.31
55	3	"Buried Secrets"	Alan Wan	Mark Henry	Michael Fong, Micah Gunnell and Rie Koga	October 17, 2014	303	1.67
56	4	"The Croaking"	Michael Chang	Kevin Burke and Chris "Doc" Wyatt	Adam Lucas, Samuel Montes and Ed Tadem	November 7, 2014	304	1.47
57	5	"In Dreams"	Sebastian Montes	Doug Langdale	Miki Brewster, Ben Li and Sheldon Vella	November 14, 2014	305	1.35
58	6	"Race With the Demon!"	Alan Wan	Gavin Hignight	Michael Fong, Micah Gunnell and Rie Koga	November 21, 2014	306	1.74
59	7	"Eyes of the Chimera"	Michael Chang	Greg Weisman	Adam Lucas, Samuel Montes and Ed Tadem	January 11, 2015	307	1.85
60	8	"Vision Quest"	Sebastian Montes	Todd Casey	Miki Brewster, Ben Li and Sheldon Vella	January 18, 2015	308	2.31
61	9	"Return to New York"	Alan Wan	Brandon Auman	Michael Fong, Micah Gunnell and Rie Koga	January 25, 2015	309	1.85
62	10	"Serpent Hunt"	Michael Chang	Randolph Heard	Adam Lucas, Samuel Montes and Ed Tadem	February 1, 2015	310	1.57
63	11	"The Pig and the Rhino"	Alan Wan	Brandon Auman	Steve Ahn, Michael Fong, Micah Gunnell and Rie Koga	March 8, 2015	311	1.81
64	12	"Battle for New York"	Michael Chang and Sebastian Montes	Brandon Auman and Mark Henry	Miki Brewster, Ben Li, Adam Lucas, Samuel Montes, Ed Tadem and Sheldon Vella	March 15, 2015	312	1.78
65	13	"Battle for New York"	Michael Chang and Sebastian Montes	Brandon Auman and Mark Henry	Miki Brewster, Ben Li, Adam Lucas, Samuel Montes, Ed Tadem and Sheldon Vella	March 15, 2015	313	1.78
66	14	"Casey Jones vs. the Underworld"	Sebastian Montes	Andrew Robinson	Miki Brewster, Ben Li and Sheldon Vella	March 22, 2015	314	1.85
67	15	"The Noxious Avenger"	Alan Wan	Todd Casey	Steve Ahn, Micah Gunnell and Rie Koga	April 26, 2015	315	1.74
68	16	"Clash of the Mutanimals"	Michael Chang	Henry Gilroy	Adam Lucas, Samuel Montes and Ed Tadem	May 3, 2015	316	1.57
69	17	"Meet Mondo Gecko"	Sebastian Montes	Kevin Burke and Chris "Doc" Wyatt	Miki Brewster, Ben Li and Sheldon Vella	May 10, 2015	317	1.80
70	18	"The Deadly Venom"	Alan Wan	Eugene Son	Steve Ahn, George Gipson and Rie Koga	May 17, 2015	318	1.70
71	19	"Turtles in Time"	Michael Chang	Randolph Heard	Adam Lucas, Samuel Montes and Ed Tadem	August 2, 2015	319	1.65
72	20	"Tale of the Yokai"	Sebastian Montes	Brandon Auman	Miki Brewster, Ben Li and Sheldon Vella	August 9, 2015	320	1.37
73	21	"Attack of the Mega Shredder!"	Alan Wan	Gavin Hignight	Steve Ahn, George Gipson and Rie Koga	August 16, 2015	321	1.78
74	22	"The Creeping Doom"	Michael Chang	Peter Di Cicco	Adam Lucas, Samuel Montes and Ed Tadem	August 23, 2015	322	1.77
75	23	"The Fourfold Trap"	Sebastian Montes	Mark Henry	Miki Brewster, Ben Li and Sheldon Vella	September 13, 2015	323	1.60
76	24	"Dinosaur Seen in Sewers!"	Michael Chang	Todd Casey	Adam Lucas, Samuel Montes and Ed Tadem	September 20, 2015	324	1.82
77	25	"Annihilation: Earth!"	Sebastian Montes and Alan Wan	Brandon Auman	Steve Ahn, Miki Brewster, George Gipson, Rie Koga, Ben Li and Sheldon Vella	September 27, 2015	325	1.43
78	26	"Annihilation: Earth!"	Sebastian Montes and Alan Wan	Brandon Auman	Steve Ahn, Miki Brewster, George Gipson, Rie Koga, Ben Li and Sheldon Vella	September 27, 2015	326	1.43

=== Season 4 (2015–17) ===
No. overall	No. in season	Title	Directed by	Written by	Storyboarded by	Original release date (Note: "Tokka vs. the World" and "Tale of Tiger Claw" first aired on December 17, 2016 in South Korea. Requiem and Owari first aired on December 30, 2016 in South Korea.)	Prod. code	US viewers (millions)
79	1	"Beyond the Known Universe"	Alan Wan	Brandon Auman	Rie Koga, Ben Li and Sheldon Vella	October 25, 2015	401	1.62
80	2	"The Moons of Thalos 3"	Michael Chang	John Shirley	JJ Conway, Adam Lucas and Ed Tadem	November 1, 2015	402	1.66
81	3	"The Weird World of Wyrm"	Sebastian Montes	Randolph Heard	Miki Brewster, George Gipson and Samuel Montes	November 8, 2015	403	1.60
82	4	"The Outlaw Armaggon"	Alan Wan	Gavin Hignight	Rie Koga, Ben Li and Sheldon Vella	November 15, 2015	404	1.41
83	5	"Riddle of the Ancient Aeons"	Michael Chang	Brandon Auman	JJ Conway, Adam Lucas and Ed Tadem	January 10, 2016	405	1.62
84	6	"Journey to the Center of Mikey's Mind"	Sebastian Montes	Todd Casey	Miki Brewster, George Gipson and Samuel Montes	January 17, 2016	406	1.58
85	7	"The Arena of Carnage"	Alan Wan	Peter Di Cicco	Rie Koga, Ben Li, Sarah Partington and Sheldon Vella	January 24, 2016	407	1.58
86	8	"The War for Dimension X"	Michael Chang	Kevin Burke and Chris "Doc" Wyatt	JJ Conway, Adam Lucas and Ed Tadem	January 31, 2016	408	1.35
87	9	"The Cosmic Ocean"	Sebastian Montes	Mark Henry	Miki Brewster, George Gipson and Samuel Montes	March 13, 2016	409	1.52
88	10	"Trans-Dimensional Turtles"	Alan Wan	Brandon Auman	Rie Koga, Ben Li and Sheldon Vella	March 27, 2016	410	1.53
89	11	"Revenge of the Triceratons"	Michael Chang and Ben Jones	Randolph Heard	JJ Conway, Adam Lucas and Ed Tadem	April 3, 2016	411	1.45
90	12	"The Evil of Dregg"	Sebastian Montes	Gavin Hignight	Miki Brewster, George Gipson and Samuel Montes	April 10, 2016	412	1.70
91	13	"The Ever-Burning Fire"	Alan Wan	John Shirley	Rie Koga, Ben Li, Sarah Partington and Sheldon Vella	April 17, 2016	413	1.40
92	14	"Earth's Last Stand"	Michael Chang and Ben Jones	Brandon Auman	JJ Conway, Adam Lucas and Ed Tadem	April 24, 2016	414	1.64
93	15	"City at War"	Sebastian Montes	Brandon Auman	Miki Brewster, George Gipson and Samuel Montes	August 14, 2016	415	1.51
94	16	"Broken Foot"	Alan Wan	Peter Di Cicco	Rie Koga, Ben Li and Sheldon Vella	August 21, 2016	416	1.46
95	17	"The Insecta Trifecta"	Michael Chang and Ben Jones	Kevin Burke and Chris "Doc" Wyatt	JJ Conway, Adam Lucas and Sarah Partington	August 28, 2016	417	1.40
96	18	"Mutant Gangland"	Sebastian Montes	Todd Casey	Miki Brewster, George Gipson and Samuel Montes	September 4, 2016	418	1.20
97	19	"Bat in the Belfry"	Alan Wan	Eugene Son	Ben Jones, Jae Hong Kim, Rie Koga, Sheldon Vella and Alan Wan	September 11, 2016	419	1.47
98	20	"The Super Shredder"	Rie Koga	Brandon Auman	JJ Conway, Adam Lucas, Sarah Partington and LeSean Thomas	November 6, 2016	420	1.47
99	21	"Darkest Plight"	Sebastian Montes	Randolph Heard	Miki Brewster, George Gipson and Samuel Montes	November 13, 2016	421	1.26
100	22	"The Power Inside Her"	Alan Wan	Peter Di Cicco	Jae Hong Kim, Ben Li, Sheldon Vella and Alan Wan	November 20, 2016	422	1.21
101	23	"Tokka vs. the World"	Rie Koga	Gavin Hignight	JJ Conway, Adam Lucas and Sarah Partington	February 5, 2017	423	1.23
102	24	"Tale of Tiger Claw"	Sebastian Montes	Mark Henry	Miki Brewster, Ben Jones, George Gipson and Samuel Montes	February 12, 2017	424	1.17
103	25	"Requiem"	Alan Wan	Brandon Auman	Jae Hong Kim, Ben Li, Sheldon Vella, Sarah Partington and Alan Wan	February 19, 2017	425	1.01
104	26	"Owari"	Rie Koga	Brandon Auman	JJ Conway, Adam Lucas and Sarah Partington	February 26, 2017	426	1.23

=== Season 5: Tales of The Teenage Mutant Ninja Turtles (2017) ===
No. overall	No. in season	Title	Directed by	Written by	Storyboarded by	Original release date (Note: Raphael: Mutant Apocalypse, "The Curse of Savanti Romero", "The Crypt of Dracula", "The Frankenstein Experiment", and "Monsters Among Us" all aired originally on Nicktoons instead of Nickelodeon.)	Prod. code	USA viewers (millions)
105	1	"Scroll of the Demodragon"	Sebastian Montes	Randolph Heard	Miki Brewster, George Gipson and Samuel Montes	March 19, 2017	501	1.01
106	2	"The Forgotten Swordsman"	Alan Wan	Peter Di Cicco	Ben Jones, Sheldon Vella and Alan Wan	March 26, 2017 (Note: This episode was first released in Super Shredder DVD on March 21, 2017.)	502	0.99
107	3	"Heart of Evil"	Rie Koga	Gavin Hignight	JJ Conway, Adam Lucas and Sarah Partington	April 2, 2017	503	1.12
108	4	"End Times"	Sebastian Montes	Brandon Auman	Miki Brewster, George Gipson and Samuel Montes	April 9, 2017	504	1.14
109	5	"Lone Rat and Cubs"	Alan Wan	Kevin Eastman	Ben Jones, Christine Liu, Sheldon Vella, Alan Wan and Jessica Zammit	August 13, 2017	505	1.06
110	6	"The Curse of Savanti Romero"	Rie Koga	Peter Di Cicco	JJ Conway, Adam Lucas and Sarah Partington	September 27, 2017	506	N/A
111	7	"The Crypt of Dracula"	Sebastian Montes	John Shirley	Miki Brewster, George Gipson and Samuel Montes	September 27, 2017	507	N/A
112	8	"The Frankenstein Experiment"	Alan Wan	Brandon Auman	Ben Jones, Sheldon Vella and Alan Wan	October 4, 2017	508	N/A
113	9	"Monsters Among Us"	Rie Koga	Kevin Burke and Chris "Doc" Wyatt	JJ Conway, Adam Lucas and Sarah Partington	October 11, 2017	509	N/A
114	10	"When Worlds Collide"	Sebastian Montes and Alan Wan	Todd Casey and Elliott Casey; Eugene Son	Miki Brewster, Ben Jones, Christine Liu, Samuel Montes, Sheldon Vella, Alan Wan and Jessica Zammit	June 18, 2017	510	0.91
115	11	"When Worlds Collide"	Sebastian Montes and Alan Wan	Todd Casey and Elliott Casey; Eugene Son	Miki Brewster, Ben Jones, Christine Liu, Samuel Montes, Sheldon Vella, Alan Wan and Jessica Zammit	June 18, 2017	511	0.91
116	12	"Wanted: Bebop & Rocksteady"	Rie Koga	Peter Di Cicco	N/A	November 12, 2017 (Note: This episode was first released in Wanted Bebop and Rocksteady DVD on September 12, 2017.)	512	0.96
117	13	"The Foot Walks Again!"	Sebastian Montes	Mark Henry	N/A	November 12, 2017	513	0.96
118	14	"The Big Blowout"	Alan Wan	Jed MacKay	N/A	November 12, 2017	514	0.96
119	15	"Yojimbo"	Rie Koga	Stan Sakai	JJ Conway, Adam Lucas and Sarah Partington	July 23, 2017	515	0.99
120	16	"Osoroshi no Tabi"	Sebastian Montes	Brandon Auman	Miki Brewster, Christopher Luc, Samuel Montes and Aeri Yoon	July 30, 2017	516	0.93
121	17	"Kagayake! Kintaro"	Alan Wan	Henry Gilroy	Ben Jones, Christine Liu, Sheldon Vella, Alan Wan and Jessica Zammit	August 6, 2017	517	0.97
Raphael: Mutant Apocalypse
122	18	"The Wasteland Warrior"	Rie Koga	Brandon Auman	Miki Brewster and JJ Conway	September 22, 2017	518	N/A
123	19	"The Impossible Desert"	Sebastian Montes	Peter Di Cicco	Ben Jones, Christine Liu and Christopher Luc	September 22, 2017	519	N/A
124	20	"Carmageddon!"	Alan Wan	Gavin Hignight	Adam Lucas and Samuel Montes	September 22, 2017	520	N/A

== Half-Shell Heroes: Blast to the Past ==
Title	Directed by	Written by	Storyboard by	Original air date
"Half-Shell Heroes: Blast to the Past"	Glen Murakami	Brandon Auman	Miki Brewster, JJ Conway, Ben Jones, Ben Li, Samira Ongchua, Sarah Partington, Byron Penaranda, Sheldon Vella, Aeri Yoon and Jessica Zammit	November 22, 2015
The turtles are trying to catch Bebop, Rocksteady and Tiger Claw, but during the process they end up in prehistoric times!

== See also ==
- List of Teenage Mutant Ninja Turtles characters
- TMNT Summer Shorts
