= Hirono (surname) =

Hirono (written: 広野) is a Japanese surname. Notable people with the surname include:

- Asami Hirono (広野 あさみ, born 1990), Japanese snowboarder
- Mazie Hirono (born 1947), American politician
- Miwa Hirono (廣野 美和), Japanese academic
- Takeyasu Hirono (born 1971), Japanese mixed martial artist
