= Teenage Mutant Ninja Turtles (2012 TV series) =

Animated series

- Also known as: Tales of the Teenage Mutant Ninja Turtles (season 5)
- Genre: Science fiction; Martial arts; Action-adventure; Superhero; Comedy drama
- Based on: Characters created by: Kevin Eastman; Peter Laird
- Developed by: Ciro Nieli; Joshua Sternin; Jennifer Ventimilia
- Showrunners: Ciro Nieli; Joshua Sternin (season 1); Jennifer Ventimilia (season 1)
- Voices of: Jason Biggs (seasons 1–2); Seth Green (seasons 3–5); Rob Paulsen; Sean Astin; Greg Cipes; Hoon Lee; Mae Whitman; Josh Peck; Kevin Michael Richardson; Nolan North; Clancy Brown; Christian Lanz; Phil LaMarr; Kelly Hu; Eric Bauza; J.B. Smoove; Fred Tatasciore; David Tennant
- Theme music composer: Sebastian Evans II; Stan Martinez
- Opening theme: "Teenage Mutant Ninja Turtles"
- Ending theme: "Teenage Mutant Ninja Turtles" (instrumental)
- Composer: Sebastian Evans II
- Country of origin: United States
- Original language: English
- No. of seasons: 5
- No. of episodes: 124 (list of episodes)

Production
- Executive producers: Ciro Nieli; Joshua Sternin (season 1); Jennifer Ventimilia (season 1); Peter Hastings (seasons 1–3); Brandon Auman (seasons 3–5)
- Producer: MacGregor Middleton
- Running time: 22 minutes
- Production company: Nickelodeon Animation Studio

Original release
- Network: Nickelodeon; Nicktoons (season 5)
- Release: September 28, 2012 – November 12, 2017

Related
- Teenage Mutant Ninja Turtles (1987–1996); Teenage Mutant Ninja Turtles (2003–2009); Batman/Teenage Mutant Ninja Turtles Adventures (2016–2017); Samurai Rabbit: The Usagi Chronicles (2022)

Teenage Mutant Ninja Turtles (2012) (Note: known as Tales of the Teenage Mutant Ninja Turtles in its fifth and final season) is an American action animated television series developed by Ciro Nieli, Joshua Sternin, and Jennifer Ventimilia for Nickelodeon, based on the Teenage Mutant Ninja Turtles characters created by Kevin Eastman and Peter Laird. The series begins with the Turtles emerging from their sewer home for the first time, using their ninjutsu training to fight enemies in present-day New York City. The series ran in the United States from September 28, 2012, to November 12, 2017.

The series was first announced in October 2009, following the news that Nickelodeon's parent company Viacom had acquired the rights to the Teenage Mutant Ninja Turtles franchise. The show was created to reach a core audience of boys aged 6 to 11; it was one half of Nickelodeon's strategy to reboot two established brands for new viewers, coinciding with Nickelodeon Animation Studio's development of new Winx Club episodes for girls. It was produced by Nickelodeon Animation Studio and LowBar Productions. Bardel Entertainment and Technicolor Animation India handled layout and CG animation services.

During the months leading to its premiere, Nickelodeon and Playmates Toys released lines of merchandise featuring the new character designs. The two-part premiere took place on September 28 and September 29, 2012, reaching 3.9 million viewers. The debut ratings were the highest for a Nickelodeon animated series since 2009, leading to a second season pickup in October 2012. Three more seasons followed; the fifth and final season was rebranded as Tales of the Teenage Mutant Ninja Turtles and did not fully air on Nickelodeon, as episodes 115–121 premiered on its sister channel Nicktoons.

== Plot ==
=== Season 1 ===
Ninjutsu master Hamato Yoshi (Splinter) is carrying his four pet turtles through the streets of Manhattan when he encounters members of an alien race called the Kraang. During an altercation with these aliens, Yoshi and the turtles are exposed to the Kraang's chemical, called mutagen, which causes organic beings to undergo major physical transformations. Yoshi takes on characteristics of a brown rat and the turtles take on human characteristics. Yoshi retreats to the New York City sewers, where he raises the four turtles as his sons and imparts to them his knowledge of ninjutsu.

Now teenagers, the turtles (Leonardo, Raphael, Donatello and Michelangelo) venture to the surface for the first time and learn that the Kraang are using the mutagen as part of their plan to take over New York City. They befriend the teenage April O'Neil after she and her psychologist father Kirby are abducted by the Kraang. Donatello, who has developed a crush on April, is able to rescue her. While Kirby remains a prisoner of the Kraang, April becomes an ally of the turtles, who try to help her locate her father. April is also trained by Splinter to be a kunoichi, a female ninja.

After learning of Splinter's and the turtles' presence in New York, Splinter's adoptive brother and long-time enemy Shredder travels there from Japan and orders his birth clan, the Foot to track down Splinter and his sons, and put an end to their clan. Learning about the Kraang's presence through his adopted daughter Karai, Shredder enters an alliance with the aliens to destroy their mutual enemies in the Hamato Clan.

The turtles later discover that the Kraang came to Earth from Dimension X and built their headquarters with a company called TCRI and are plotting to use the mutagen and a set of Kraang-like powers that April was born with to convert Earth into a planet suitable for their race. After the turtles rescue Kirby, the Kraang invade New York, but the turtles and April emerge triumphant when they send the Technodrome, the Kraang leader Kraang Prime's ship, crashing into the sea. Meanwhile, Splinter battles Shredder and learns that Karai is his daughter, Hamato Miwa, who was kidnapped by Shredder and who believes that Splinter killed her mother. The season ends with the turtles celebrating their victory over the Kraang as Splinter hides the secret of Miwa from them.

=== Season 2 ===
The turtles struggle to contain an outbreak of mutations that occurs thanks to the leftover mutagen from the thwarted Kraang invasion. Kirby is among the victims of the outbreak, and a misunderstanding leads April to break off her friendship with the turtles. However, the turtles are able to earn her forgiveness when they save her from Karai, who has taken temporary command of the Foot while the Shredder is away in Japan. Along with April came her new friend Casey Jones, who helps repel an assault on the turtles' lair. Kirby is eventually restored to his human form when Donatello manages to concoct another Kraang chemical called retro-mutagen, which causes organic beings to reverse their major physical transformations.

Meanwhile, Shredder returns from Japan with the mutated Japanese bounty hunter Tiger Claw as his new second-in-command. Tiger Claw is sent through a portal to the 1987–1996 animated series reality, but later returns to the 2012 reality.

During a battle with the turtles, Karai is informed of her true nature by Leonardo (who has developed a crush on her since season 1), but she is too reluctant to accept it. When she is taken to the lair, she finally realizes the truth and disowns Shredder, who responds by imprisoning her. Repeated attempts to free Karai ultimately succeed, but Shredder captures her again and uses her as bait to kill the Hamato Clan. However, Karai is inadvertently mutated into a horned viper.

In response to this, Shredder has the Foot Clan help the Kraang, who have just perfected the previously unstable mutagen, launch a second invasion of New York, starting by destroying the turtles' lair courtesy of April's friend Irma, who was really an elite Kraang spy named Kraang Subprime, and forcing them to abandon it. The Kraang begin mutating New York's populace, including Kirby, despite the efforts of Earth's military and the turtles. Leonardo is gravely wounded when he is ambushed by the entire Foot, and Splinter is seemingly killed during a battle with Shredder. The turtles, April, and Casey are forced to flee to the O'Neil family's summer home in Upstate New York as the Kraang conquers Manhattan.

=== Season 3 ===
The group takes refuge at the O'Neil family's summer home in North Hampton to recuperate from their loss at the hands of the Kraang and the Foot Clan. Leonardo takes an extended amount of time to recover, but guided by an apparition of Splinter, overcomes his physical and mental wounds. They eventually return to New York City with the goal of finding Splinter, Karai, Kirby, and their other missing allies and liberate the city from the Kraang. They are successful in finding Splinter and set up a temporary base in the abandoned Antonio's Pizza, and Donatello begins work on new samples of retro-mutagen as the search for Kirby and Karai continues.

Meanwhile, Shredder sends his new minions Bebop and Rocksteady to find Karai. The duo succeed, and Shredder promises to cure her. The turtles run into a new team called the Mighty Mutanimals, with whom they manage to banish the Kraang back to Dimension X and free New York. The effect of the invasion eventually earns Shredder cemented control of the city's criminal underworld for his efforts to create a mind-control serum meant for the turtles, Mutanimals and Karai.

The turtles are later offered by future time sorceress Renet to time travel to the past, where they meet up with a younger Hamato Yoshi and Oroku Saki, as well as Yoshi's late wife and Karai's mother, Teng Shen. During the battle between Yoshi and Saki inside the Hamato Clan dojo, Shen is accidentally killed by Saki, who meant to kill Yoshi instead. Saki leaves the dojo after his hair burns off from the fire and kidnaps Yoshi and Shen's baby daughter Miwa, vowing to raise her as Karai and leaving Yoshi to die. After his escape, the turtles save Yoshi before traveling back to the present with Renet.

When the Kraang return to Earth, the Turtles discover that the Kraang have another enemy from Dimension X in the form of the Triceraton empire. Despite their best efforts and Shredder violating the Foot Clan's temporary truce with the Turtles by stabbing Splinter during the fight, the ruthless Triceratons activate the Heart of Darkness, a black hole-creating machine which annihilates the Kraang, Earth, and everyone on it. But just as it comes to the worst for the Turtles, April, and Casey, they are rescued by the Fugitoid, an alien robot, and taken onto his spacecraft.

=== Season 4 ===
After the Turtles, April, and Casey are saved from the destruction of Earth, the Fugitoid uses his spacecraft the Ulixes to travel six months back in time in order for him and the Turtles to prevent the Triceraton Empire led by Emperor Zanmoran from again assembling the three components of the Heart of Darkness that are scattered throughout the universe before everything on Earth is lost. Besides fighting the Triceratons, the Turtles also face new enemies in outer space like Lord Vringath Dregg of the planet Sectoid and the bounty hunter Armaggon, and even have an adventure with their interdimensional 1987 counterparts and their enemy Krang who is an exiled relative of Kraang Subprime. Despite the efforts of the Turtles, the Triceratons are still able to collect all three pieces of the Black Hole Generator, only for the Turtles to return to Earth and join forces with their past selves to warn Splinter before he is killed by the Shredder, stop the detonator of the Heart of Darkness, and defeat the Triceratons. The Fugitoid destroys the Black Hole Generator near the Triceraton spacefleet, causing to explode, presumably killing the Triceratons. In the aftermath of the fight against the Triceratons, the past versions of the Turtles, April, and Casey leave Earth with the past Fugitoid in the Ulixes while the present Fugitoid's head reactivates in Earth's orbit.

Weeks later following the Triceraton Invasion being thwarted and the Foot Clan's disappearance, April is promoted to kunoichi at the time when the witch Shinigami arrives and is revealed that she is Karai's friend as they plot to rebuild the Hamato Clan and dispose of Shredder who is still recuperating from his last fight with Splinter. While Karai and Shinigami got some ninjas on their side, the Foot Clan strengthens the Footbot army by creating the Elite Footbots. Furthermore, some other crime organizations have been plotting to take over the Foot Clan's territory and a crystal shard of unimaginable power which April received from the alien Aeons during their space adventure is beginning to exert a baleful influence on her. Using a special mutagen formula made by Baxter Stockman, Oroku Saki recuperates and becomes Super-Shredder to take back control of the Foot Clan. Once a stable formula is made, Super-Shredder attacks the Turtles, the Mighty Mutanimals, Karai, and Shinigami which ends with Splinter being killed in battle against Super-Shredder. This leads up to the final battle at Super-Shredder's hidden mansion, where Leonardo manages to kill Super-Shredder.

=== Season 5 ===
Following the death of the Super-Shredder, Tiger Claw leads the Foot Cultists in obtaining the Scroll of the Demodragon and a special control amulet called the "Seal of the Ancients" that would enable him to summon the demodragon Kavaxas. When Kavaxas is summoned from the Netherworld, Tiger Claw plans to use Kavaxas' wish-granting abilities to revive Shredder. Upon demonstrating the revival ability on Rahzar, who was killed in battle with Leatherhead, Kavaxas states that he will need the Kuro Kabuto that contains Shredder's mental energies. After Rahzar and Tiger Claw reclaims the Kuro Kabuto, Kavaxas states that they will need Shredder's heart for the revival to occur. After being resurrected, Shredder destroys the Seal of the Ancients, which enables Kavaxas to raise the spirits of the Netherworld to invade Earth. While Splinter's ghost helps those fighting on the surface, Michelangelo repairs the Seal of the Ancients, allowing Shredder to drag Kavaxas back to the Netherworld.

Afterwards, the Turtles face different challenges. This includes the return of Lord Dregg when he collaborates with Newtralizer, being transported to Miyamoto Usagi's reality where they help to protect the pug Kintaro from the evil gray wolf Jei, an adventure featuring an alternate future ruled by mutant animals, and another adventure involving the return of Savanti Romero where he collaborates with Count Dracula to make Earth more habitable for monsters.

The Turtles later reunite with their 1987 counterparts when they face the return of Bebop and Rocksteady, who are recruited by the Shredder and the Kraang's counterparts. They plan to conquer the Earths of both the 1987 and 2012 realities with a fully powered Technodrome after their Bebop and Rocksteady were accidentally left behind. While the Turtles and their allies fight off a horde of Foot Soldiers from the 1987–1996 series reality and the 2012 Rock Soldiers led by Traag and Granitor, Bebop and Rocksteady discover Shredder and Krang's treacherous scheme to destroy the Earth and choose to become heroes in order to save the planet.

==== Raphael: Mutant Apocalypse ====
The three-part epilogue series finale, released as a made-for-TV film titled Raphael: Mutant Apocalypse, features a flash-forward to several decades into a possible post-apocalyptic future, following a major catastrophe as Raphael traverses a wasteland Earth, along with Donatello (whose consciousness is transferred into a robot). They eventually encounter Michelangelo (who has become a hippie guru, "The Holy Chalupa") and finally Leonardo, who had lost his memory and sanity and mutated into the archvillain Maximus Kong, before Raphael is finally able to re-trigger Leonardo's consciousness, reuniting the four core characters for a bittersweet happy ending.

== Characters ==
- Leonardo (voiced by Jason Biggs until "The Wrath of Tiger Claw", Dominic Catrambone for the last seven episodes of Season 2, Seth Green in Seasons 3–5) – Leonardo, called "Leo" for short, is an enthusiastic ninjutsu student, who wears a blue mask, and fights with two swords called Niten Ryu. He leads the various missions of the Turtles.
- Donatello (voiced by Rob Paulsen, who had previously voiced Raphael in the 1987 series) – Donatello, called "Donnie" for short, is in charge of the designs and manufacturers of all of the tools and weapons in the Turtles' arsenal. He is also a gifted hacker. He wears a purple mask and fights with a bō which also can be converted to a naginata via a blade inside one end of the staff.
- Raphael (voiced by Sean Astin) – Raphael, also called "Raph", wears a red mask and fights with two sai. Known for his rage, he commonly takes it out on Mikey, and on occasions Leo, due to their feud. He acts as the muscles of the Turtles' attacks.
- Michelangelo (voiced by Greg Cipes) – Michelangelo, known as "Mikey", is the least mature of the turtles and is a lover of video games, skateboarding, pranks and pizza. He wears an orange mask and fights with two nunchaku which also can be converted into kusarigama via a blade inside of one of the sticks of each nunchaku and extra lengths of chain stored in the other. He brings a brighter mood than his brothers towards the team.
- Hamato Yoshi / Splinter (voiced by Hoon Lee)
- April O'Neil (voiced by Mae Whitman)
- Casey Jones (voiced by Josh Peck)
- Shredder (voiced by Kevin Michael Richardson)
- The Kraang (voiced by Nolan North)
  - Kraang Prime (voiced by Roseanne Barr in seasons 1–2 and Rachel Butera in season 3)
  - Kraang Subprime (voiced by Gilbert Gottfried)
- Chris Bradford / Dogpound / Rahzar (voiced by Clancy Brown)
- Xever Montes / Fishface (voiced by Christian Lanz)
- Baxter Stockman (voiced by Phil LaMarr)
- Karai (voiced by Kelly Hu)
- Takeshi / Tiger Claw (voiced by Eric Bauza)
- Anton Zeck / Bebop (voiced by J.B. Smoove)
- Ivan Steranko / Rocksteady (voiced by Fred Tatasciore)
- Professor Honeycutt / Fugitoid (voiced by David Tennant)

== Background and production ==
On October 21, 2009, Viacom published a press release announcing that it had bought the complete rights of the Teenage Mutant Ninja Turtles franchise from Peter Laird for $60 million, and would be developing a CGI-animated TV series for its Nickelodeon family of channels for broadcast in 2012. The release also confirmed a feature film to be produced for Paramount Pictures (also a division of Viacom), set for an August 2014 release.

In a May 2011 issue of The Licensing Book, Nickelodeon published subject-to-change concept art of all four turtles, along with artwork from the studio's revamped Winx Club series. Both shows were developed simultaneously at Nickelodeon Animation Studio as part of the company's strategy to reboot two established brands for new viewers. TMNT was geared to a core target demographic of boys aged 6 to 11, while Winx Club was intended to reach a similar age group of girls. For their version of Teenage Mutant Ninja Turtles, Nickelodeon also took note of a secondary audience in teens and adults. In June, it was revealed that the show's creative team would be led by designer Ciro Nieli and writers Jennifer Ventimilia and Joshua Sternin. The three crew members held an interview the following month; they mentioned that the turtles would be differentiated physically, but that their personalities would not be changed. Nieli stated that he had been influenced by the 1984 comics, while Ventimilia and Sternin were fans of the 1987 series and 1990s films in college.

At the American International Toy Fair in February 2012, the first line of tie-in figures was displayed. As previously announced, the line was produced by longtime TMNT licensee Playmates Toys. In March 2012, final artwork from the series was leaked on the Nickelodeon website before it was taken down. The images showed the designs of all four turtles, Shredder, Splinter, a teenage April O'Neil and the Kraang, an alien race based on Krang and the Utroms. A trailer for the series was released on June 21, 2012, on Nickelodeon USA. In July, Playmates released the show's merchandise ahead of its television debut.

Jason Biggs originally voiced Leonardo and Rob Paulsen voiced Donatello. In June 2011, it was confirmed that Sean Astin was voicing Raphael and Greg Cipes was voicing Michelangelo. In August 2011, it was revealed that Mae Whitman would be voicing April O'Neil. In April 2012, it was announced that Phil LaMarr would voice Baxter Stockman and Nolan North would voice the Kraang, while Roseanne Barr was confirmed to voice their leader, Kraang Prime. Actress Kelly Hu confirmed her role as Karai in May 2012. Corey Feldman, who previously voiced Donatello in the first and third TMNT films, was confirmed to play the role of Slash. Recurring TMNT character Casey Jones began appearing in the second season, voiced by Josh Peck. In June 2014, it was announced that Seth Green would replace Jason Biggs and Dominic Catrambone as the voice of Leonardo in season 3. Biggs had been fired from the show following controversial and inappropriate posts on Twitter. His final credited appearance was in the episode "The Wrath of Tiger Claw."

== Episodes ==
Season	Episodes	Originally released	
Season	Episodes	First released	Last released
1	26	September 28, 2012	August 8, 2013
2	26	October 12, 2013	September 26, 2014
3	26	October 3, 2014	September 27, 2015
4	26	October 25, 2015	February 26, 2017
5	20	March 19, 2017	November 12, 2017

== Related animation ==
=== Films ===
==== Half-Shell Heroes: Blast to the Past ====
On November 22, 2015, Nickelodeon aired an animated special, Half-Shell Heroes: Blast to the Past. In the special, the Ninja Turtles are accidentally transported back to the Cretaceous period by an ancient meteorite and must work together with Bebop and Rocksteady (along with some newly befriended dinosaur allies) to get back to their own time, while simultaneously fending off would-be predators and a faction of the Triceraton Army led by General Zera (voiced by Kate Mulgrew), coming to prehistoric Earth. Random House also released a book based on the special while Playmates released new dinosaur toys in the fall to coincide with the program. The special was seen by 1.41 million viewers. It was released on DVD, through Nickelodeon and Paramount Home Media Distribution, on March 15, 2016.

==== Raphael: Mutant Apocalypse ====
A television film based on the series was developed to serve as the series finale; alternately aired in three parts as the episodes "The Wasteland Warrior, "The Impossible Desert", and "Carmageddon!", Raphael: Mutant Apocalypse was released on September 22, 2017. Ahead of the film's release, executive producer Ciro Nieli stated that he intended for the film to serve as the series finale in order to prevent any alteration of the timeline that he and the rest of the crew had built.

=== Short films ===
A series of short films were released during the course of the series, including: Turtles in Time, Teenage Mecha Ninja Turtles, and TMNT Team Up: The Short Series.

==== Teenage Mecha Ninja Turtles ====
Teenage Mecha Ninja Turtles focuses on the eponymous group, four human teen mecha pilots trained by an aged Michelangelo (with Greg Cipes reprising his role from the series) set in a futuristic New York City (circa 2090) inhabited both by humans and anthropomorphic animals, including a McGruff-like police chief. The four children each pilot colored turtle like mechs, and consist of the following: team leader Frida (voiced by America Young) pilots the red, Raphael-like mech; the blue mech with cloaking abilities that resembles Leonardo is piloted by Frida's antagonistic teammate Jackson (Eric Artel); the battle happy Kusama (Tania Gunadi) pilots the Michelangelo-like orange mech; and the purple mech, which is heavily armored and wields a bo staff that can transform into a hammer, is piloted by the nerdy and somewhat anxious Basque (Khary Payton). The short features the Mecha Turtles subduing a group of anthropomorphic thieves resembling hyenas and other canines, consisting of wolf-like leader Grimm, spotted hyena-like members Jester Joe (both voiced by Eric Bauza) and Jester Jim (voiced by David Kaye, who also voices the armored police officer Sgt. Swat), and several other silent members.

=== Samurai Rabbit: The Usagi Chronicles ===
In April 2022, Yuki Matsuzaki was announced that he would be reprising his role as Miyamoto Usagi from the fifth season of the 2012 Teenage Mutant Ninja Turtles animated series (titled Tales of the Teenage Mutant Ninja Turtles) in a new animated series, titled Samurai Rabbit: The Usagi Chronicles. Airing on Netflix from April 28, 2022, to September 1, 2022, the series would star Darren Barnet in the lead role as Usagi's descendant "Yuichi Usagi", an original creation for the series.

== Broadcast ==
The series premiered on Canadian channel YTV on September 29, 2012. It also premiered on Nickelodeon in the United Kingdom and Ireland on October 1, 2012. It premiered on Nickelodeon in Australia and New Zealand on October 8, 2012. It premiered on Nickelodeon Canada on September 2, 2013. In India, it premiered in 2013 on Nickelodeon and Sonic and currently airs on Nick HD+. It also airs on Channel 5 in the UK.

== Reception ==
IGN has given the show positive reviews, with many episodes reviewed being given the "Editor's Choice" title. The season 2 finale "The Invasion" has received the highest rating of 10/10. The series premiered in the U.S. to 3.9 million viewers.

Variety has praised the show, saying "...handsomely produced effort, with a strong vocal cast, considerable humor and scads of high-spirited action. If the goal was to introduce the Turtles to a new generation — amphibious mission accomplished."

=== Accolades ===
Awards
Year	Award	Category	Recipients and nominees	Result
2013	40th Daytime Creative Arts Emmy Awards	Outstanding Animated Program	Teenage Mutant Ninja Turtles	Nominated
2013	40th Daytime Creative Arts Emmy Awards	Outstanding Casting for an Animated Series or Special	Meredith Layne, Sarah Noonan, and Gene Vassilaros	Nominated
2013	40th Daytime Creative Arts Emmy Awards	Outstanding Sound Editing - Animation	Jeff Shiffman, Otis Van Osten, Anna Adams, Gerry Gonzalez, Matt Hall, Roger Pallan, John Sanacore, and Alex Ullrich	Nominated
2014	41st Annie Awards	Outstanding Achievement, Editorial in an Animated TV/Broadcast Production	Myra Lopez, Ana Adams, and Justin Baker	Nominated
2014	2014 Kids' Choice Awards	Favorite Cartoon	Teenage Mutant Ninja Turtles	Nominated
2014	2014 Nickelodeon Indonesia Kids' Choice Awards	Favorite Cartoon Show	Teenage Mutant Ninja Turtles	Nominated
2014	41st Daytime Creative Arts Emmy Awards	Outstanding Casting for an Animated Series or Special	Sarah Noonan, Gene Vassilaros, and Meredith Layne	Won
2014	41st Daytime Creative Arts Emmy Awards	Outstanding Sound Mixing – Animation	Teenage Mutant Ninja Turtles	Nominated
2014	66th Primetime Emmy Awards	Primetime Emmy Award for Outstanding Animated Program (for Programming Less Than One Hour)	"The Manhattan Project"	Nominated
2014	2014 British Academy Children's Awards	International	Alan Wan, Brandon Auman, Ciro Nieli	Nominated
2015	Producers Guild of America Awards 2014	Outstanding Children's Program	Teenage Mutant Ninja Turtles	Nominated
2015	2015 Kids' Choice Awards	Favorite Cartoon	Teenage Mutant Ninja Turtles	Nominated
2015	42nd Daytime Creative Arts Emmy Awards	Outstanding Casting for an Animated Series or Special	Meredith Layne, Sarah Noonan, and Gene Vassilaros	Won (tie)
2015	42nd Daytime Creative Arts Emmy Awards	Outstanding Sound Mixing – Animation	Teenage Mutant Ninja Turtles	Nominated
2016	Producers Guild of America Awards 2015	Outstanding Children's Program	Teenage Mutant Ninja Turtles	Nominated
2016	43rd Daytime Creative Arts Emmy Awards	Outstanding Casting for an Animated Series or Special	Meredith Layne, Sarah Noonan, and Gene Vassilaros	Nominated
2016	43rd Daytime Creative Arts Emmy Awards	Outstanding Sound Mixing – Animation	Justin Brinsfield, Matt Corey, Manny Grijalva, D.J. Lynch, Jeff Shiffman	Won
2016	43rd Daytime Creative Arts Emmy Awards	Outstanding Sound Editing – Animation	Jeff Shiffman, Jessey Drake, Anna Adams, Elliot Herman and Roger Pallan	Nominated
2017	44th Annie Awards	Best Animated Television/Broadcast Production For Children	"Trans-Dimensional Turtles"	Nominated
2017	2017 Kids' Choice Awards	Favorite Cartoon	Teenage Mutant Ninja Turtles	Nominated
2018	2018 Kids' Choice Awards	Favorite Cartoon	Teenage Mutant Ninja Turtles	Nominated

== Merchandise ==
=== Toys ===
Playmates Toys created a new line of Teenage Mutant Ninja Turtles consumer products to go along with the show.

In mid-2012, Playmates Toys released their first wave of basic Teenage Mutant Ninja Turtles action figures which consisted of "hero figures" Leonardo, Donatello, Raphael, Michelangelo, Splinter and April O'Neil as well as "villain characters" Shredder, Kraang, and a Foot Soldier. In early 2013, Playmates released series 2 which consisted of the new "hero" character Metalhead as well as new villains Dogpound and Fishface. In April 2013, the third wave appeared which included the "hero" character Leatherhead as well as villains Snakeweed and Baxter Stockman. Wave four was released in early August and it featured the villains Rat King and Spyroach as well as new "Stealth Tech" versions of the four turtles. Wave 5 was released in October with a 7 pack of Mousers as well as four baby versions of the Turtles. October saw the final release of 2013 with wave six which included two new villains: Spider Bytez and a newly sculpted Shredder figure featuring a removable helmet and cape. Wave seven first appeared in February 2014 with figures for Kirby Bat, Squirrelanoid, Casey Jones, and Mutagen Man.

The Lego Group released a Lego theme of Teenage Mutant Ninja Turtles between 2012 and 2014.

In July 2014, Build-A-Bear Workshop released a series of plush versions of the Turtles, as well as other TMNT themed apparel including an outfit of Shredder, along with items such as the Turtles' signature weapons.

In April 2014, Diamond Select Toys unveiled the first series of Minimates mini-figures based on the Nickelodeon series. Two unpainted promotional figures were given away at the 2014 San Diego Comic-Con, and Series 1 was released in fall 2014 as blind bags at Kmart and comic shops, and in 2-packs at Toys "R" Us. Each location had one or two exclusive characters in addition to their shared characters. Series 2 was released in comic shops in early-2015 and at Toys "R" Us in mid-2015, again with both shared and exclusive figures. Series 3 is scheduled for both locations for the fall of 2015. A Series 4 has been confirmed.

=== Comics ===
IDW Publishing released a spin-off comic series titled Teenage Mutant Ninja Turtles: New Animated Adventures featuring original adventures set between episodes of the TV series starting July 2013. After 24 issues, the series was relaunched as Teenage Mutant Ninja Turtles: Amazing Adventures in August 2015. Amazing Adventures was published until September 2017, with a total of 14 regular issues, one special issue guest-starring Carmelo Anthony, a three-issue miniseries titled Robotanimals, and the crossover miniseries Batman/Teenage Mutant Ninja Turtles Adventures, in which the television series' incarnation of the Turtles meet the Batman of the DC Animated Universe.

=== Home media ===
The series has also been released to home video, mainly DVD. Nickelodeon's typical Region 1 DVD release schedule is to release each season across three or four volumes, consisting of four DVDs total, with each disc containing about 6-7 sequential episodes. On December 6, 2022, Paramount Home Entertainment (Nickelodeon label) released Teenage Mutant Ninja Turtles: The Complete Series on DVD.

Season	Episodes	DVD release dates		
Season	Episodes	Region 1	Region 2	Region 4
1	26	Volume 1: Rise of the Turtles: February 26, 2013; Volume 2: Enter Shredder: July 16, 2013; Volume 3: Ultimate Showdown: October 1, 2013; The Complete 1st Season: October 7, 2014; Pulverizer Power: June 9, 2015; The Complete 1st and 2nd Seasons: October 6, 2015	Complete Season: November 18, 2013	Volume 1: March 6, 2013; Volume 2: June 26, 2013; Volume 3: September 4, 2013; Volume 4: October 23, 2013; Complete Season: October 23, 2013
2	26	Volume 4: Mutagen Mayhem: March 18, 2014; Volume 5: The Good, The Bad and Casey Jones: July 1, 2014; Volume 6: Showdown in Dimension X: December 2, 2014; The Complete 1st and 2nd Seasons: October 6, 2015	Complete Season: March 30, 2015	Volume 5: June 25, 2014; Volume 6: September 10, 2014; Volume 7: January 7, 2015; Volume 8: March 25, 2015; Complete Season: June 24, 2015
3	26	Volume 7: Retreat: March 10, 2015; Volume 8: Return to NYC: July 14, 2015; Volume 9: Revenge: December 1, 2015	Complete Season: September 5, 2016	Volume 9: June 24, 2015; Volume 10: September 9, 2015; Volume 11: November 5, 2015; Volume 12: April 7, 2016; Complete Season: May 12, 2016
4	26	Volume 10: Beyond the Known Universe: May 24, 2016; Volume 11: Earth's Last Stand: December 13, 2016; Volume 12: Super Shredder (episodes 20–26): March 21, 2017	Beyond the Known Universe: October 10, 2016; Earth's Last Stand: March 27, 2017; Super Shredder: March 27, 2017	Volume 13: May 12, 2016; Volume 14: September 15, 2016; Volume 15: November 23, 2016; Volume 16: April 12, 2017; Complete Season: June 14, 2017
5	20	Volume 12: Super Shredder (episodes 1–4): March 21, 2017; Volume 13: Wanted: Bebop & Rocksteady: September 12, 2017; Volume 14: The Final Chapters: December 12, 2017	TBA	Volume 17: June 14, 2017; Volume 18: September 6, 2017; Volume 19: November 15, 2017; Volume 20: April 11, 2018; Complete Season: April 11, 2018

=== Video games ===
In 2013, Nickelodeon published and distributed Rooftop Run developed by Kung Fu Factory for iOS devices such as the iPhone, iPad, and iPod Touch.

On August 28, 2013, Activision released Out of the Shadows, a downloadable 3D beat 'em up game, for Xbox 360 and Microsoft Windows. On April 15, 2014, a version was released for the PlayStation 3. The game features an online multiplayer co-op for up to four players.

Activision also released a Teenage Mutant Ninja Turtles video game based on the series for Wii, Xbox 360, and Nintendo 3DS on October 22, 2013. It was developed by Magic Pockets.

On September 4, 2014, Activision announced there being a second game based on the show called Danger of the Ooze. The game was released on October 28, 2014, for Nintendo 3DS, Xbox 360, and PlayStation 3. The game was developed by WayForward.

In 2017, Raw Thrills developed a beat 'em up arcade game based on the show of the same name, where players can play the turtles and fight villains and boss levels all at once. On February 27, 2024, Raw Thrills and Cradle Games had developed the home console version of the arcade game published by GameMill Entertainment titled Teenage Mutant Ninja Turtles Arcade: Wrath of the Mutants, it was released for Xbox One, Xbox Series X|S, PlayStation 4, PlayStation 5, Nintendo Switch, Microsoft Windows and Steam on April 23, 2024.
