= Miwa Sasaki =

Japanese footballer

Personal information
- Date of birth: 20 May 1995 (age 31)
- Place of birth: Sendai, Japan
- Height: 1.56 m (5 ft 1 in)
- Position: Forward

Team information
- Current team: MyNavi Sendai Ladies
- Number: 30

Senior career*
| Years | Team | Apps | (Gls) |
| 2014-2018 | Vegalta Sendai Ladies/ Mynavi Vegalta Sendai Ladies | | |
| 2019-2023 | Nojima Stella | 20 | (1) |
| 2023 | Bayside United | 9 | (4) |
| 2023- | Mynavi Sendai Ladies | | |
- * Club domestic league appearances and goals

Miwa Sasaki (born 20 May 1995) is a Japanese professional footballer who plays as a forward for WE League club MyNavi Sendai Ladies.

== Club career ==
Sasaki made her WE League debut on 12 September 2021.

She signed with Bayside United on 8 January 2023 for the 2023 National Premier Leagues Victoria Women season.

On September 21, 2023, she returned to MyNavi Sendai Ladies.
