= Miwa Hirono =

Japanese scholar

Dr Miwa Hirono (廣野 美和, Hirono Miwa) is a Japanese political scientist and scholar of China. She is Professor of International Relations at the College of Global Liberal Arts and the Graduate School of International Relations, Ritsumeikan University. Her research examines China's global affairs, focusing on Chinese business activities in the Global South and the interactions between Chinese actors and host communities.

Her recent publication is Globalising Chinese Actors and Internalising the Belt and Road (ANU Press, 2025), What Did the Belt and Road Initiative Bring About: The China Question and Investment Dilemma (in Japanese) [Ittaiichiro ha nani wo motarashitanoka: Chugoku mondai to toshi no Jilemma] (Keisō Shobō, 2021), and China’s Evolving Approach to Peacekeeping (Routledge, 2012). She is now developing “Global China Studies” in Japan—a field integrating theories with Global South perspectives on China. She has held fellowships at Harvard Kennedy School (Fulbright, 2018–19), the University of Nottingham (RCUK, 2008–15), the Chinese Academy of Social Sciences, and Peking University (2003–04). Currently, she is a visiting fellow at the Australian National University. Her PhD research at the Australian National University concerned the work of religious NGOs in China and formed the basis of the book Civilizing Missions: International Religious Agencies in China.

Hirono became the subject of a visa controversy after the UK Home Office retroactively applied a rule concerning the amount of time a temporary resident could spend overseas to deny her the right to remain in Britain. This decision was widely criticized by higher education practitioners as undermining Britain's ability to attract and retain highly skilled foreign scholars. Since then, Dr Miwa Hirono has returned to Japan and is now the Professor of International Relations at Ritsumeikan University.

== Education ==
Ph.D. 2007 The Australian National University (International Relations)

M.A. 2001 Keio University, Tokyo, Japan (Political Science)

B.A. 1999 Keio University, Tokyo, Japan (Laws)

== Employment (Within Academia) ==
- Professor, College of Global Liberal Arts and Graduate School of International Relations, Ritsumeikan University, Kyoto, April 2015-present (Professor from 2022; GLA from 2019).
- RCUK Research Fellow, School of Politics and International Relations, University of Nottingham, September 2008-March 2015.
- Lecturer (temporary) (‘Chinese Politics – Global Dimension’ MPhil course), School of Politics and International Studies, University of Cambridge, January-May 2011.
- Lecturer (temporary) (Global Civil Society and the Role of NGOs—the core course), Graduate School of International Affairs, Department of International Relations, The Australian National University, Canberra, Australia, July-September 2008.
- Lecturer (temporary) (Theory and Issues in International Relations), School of Political Science and Communication, University of Canterbury, Christchurch, New Zealand, July-October 2006.

== Professional Services ==
- The China Quarterly Editorial Board Member, 2021-present.
- International Relations of the Asia Pacific, Executive Deputy Editor, 2020-2024.
- Ritsumeikan Asia- Japan Journal Editor, 2019-present.
- Ritsumeikan Asia-Japan Research Institute, Editorial Board Member 2019-present.
- A member of UKRI/ESRC Peer Review College 2012-2020.
- Consultant for Humanitarian Policy Group, Overseas Development Institute, to provide a report on China’s humanitarianism, February-August 2016.
- Consultant for Global Public Policy Institute in Berlin, to provide a policy report on China’s humanitarianism for the European Community Humanitarian Office (ECHO), August-November 2012.
- Associate Fellow of the Higher Education Academy, 2011-present.

== Selected publications ==
=== Books ===
Hirono, M. (ed.) 2025. Globalising Chinese Actors and Internalising the Belt and Road: Implications for Global and Domestic Governance, Canberra: ANU Press. http://doi.org/10.22459/GCAIBR.2025

Hirono, M. 2025. ‘Introduction: The Belt and Road Initiative from Bottom-up Perspectives’ and ‘The Globalisation of Chinese Actors and the Transformation of the BRI into a Domestic Issue: Implications for Global and Domestic Governance and for Japan’, in M. Hirono (ed.) Globalising Chinese Actors and Internalising the Belt and Road: Implications for Global and Domestic Governance, Canberra: ANU Press.

Hirono, M. (ed.) 2021. What Did the Belt and Road Initiative Bring About: The China Question and Investment Dilemma (in Japanese) [Ittaiichiro ha nani wo motarashitanoka: Chugoku mondai to toshi no Jilemma], Keisō Shobō.

Lanteigne, M. and M. Hirono (eds.) 2012. China’s Evolving Approach to Peacekeeping (reprint of the special issue), London: Routledge. https://doi.org/10.4324/9780203718803

Lanteigne, M. and M. Hirono. 2013. ‘Two Pillars of China’s Global Peace Engagement Strategy: UN Peacekeeping and International Peacebuilding’, in M. Lanteigne and M. Hirono (eds.) China’s Evolving Approach to Peacekeeping, London: Routledge, 110–28.

Hirono, M. and J. O’Hagan (eds.) 2012. Cultures of Humanitarianism: Perspectives from the Asia-Pacific, Keynote 11, Department of International Relations, The Australian National University. http://hdl.handle.net/1885/20492

Hirono, M. 2008. Civilizing Missions: International Religious Agencies in China, New York: Palgrave Macmillan. https://doi.org/10.1057/9780230616493

Book reviews appeared in The China Quarterly, The China Journal, Millennium, Australian Journal of Political Science, and China Review International.

=== Peer-Review Journal Articles ===
Hirono, M. and M. R. Nurdin. 2024. ‘Local Knowledge as the Basis of Disaster Management and Humanitarian Assistance’, Disasters, 48(S1): e12634, June. https://doi.org/10.1111/disa.12634

Hirono, M. 2024. ‘Diasporas as A Linchpin in Local and International Humanitarian Action: A Case Study of the Chinese in Aceh Following the 2004 Tsunami’, Disasters, 48(S1): e12633, June. https://doi.org/10.1111/disa.12633

Marutschke, D. M., M. R. Nurdin and M. Hirono. 2024. ‘Quantifying Social Capital in Post-disaster Indonesia: Methodological Innovation by an AI-Based Language Model’, Disasters, e12631, June. https://doi.org/10.1111/disa.12631[ＴＢＮ1]

Hirono, M. 2020. ‘Impact of China’s Decision-making Processes on International Cooperation: Cases of Peacekeeping and Humanitarian Assistance/Disaster Relief’, Australian Journal of International Affairs, 74(1): 54–71. https://doi.org/10.1080/10357718.2019.1693502

Hirono, M. 2020. ‘China’s Expanding Military Power in Africa’, in Dealing with China in a Globalized World: Some Concerns and Considerations, Konrad-Adenauer-Stiftung, 71–85. https://www.kas.de/en/web/philippinen/single-title/-/content/dealing-with-china-in-a-globalized-world-some-concerns-and-considerations

Hirono, M. 2019. ‘China’s Conflict Mediation and the Durability of the Principle of Non-Interference: The Case of Post-2014 Afghanistan’, The China Quarterly, 239: 614–34. 10.1017/S0305741018001753

Hirono, M., Y. Jiang and M. Lanteigne. 2019. ‘China’s New Roles and Behaviour in Conflict-Affected Regions: Reconsidering Non-Interference and Non-Intervention’, The China Quarterly, 239: 573–93. 10.1017/S0305741018001741

Hirono, M. 2019. ‘Asymmetrical Rivalry between China and Japan in Africa: To What Extent has Sino-Japan Rivalry Become a Global Phenomenon?’, The Pacific Review, 32(5): 831–62. https://doi.org/10.1080/09512748.2019.1569118

Hirono, M. 2019. ‘China and Peacekeeping’, in T. Wright (ed.) Oxford Bibliographies in Chinese Studies, New York: Oxford University Press. https://doi.org/10.1093/obo/9780199920082-0168

O’Hagan, J. and M. Hirono. 2014. ‘Fragmentation of the International Humanitarian Order? Understanding “Cultures of Humanitarianism” in East Asia’, Ethics and International Affairs, 28(4): 409–24. 10.1017/S0892679414000586

Hirono, M. and S. Suzuki. 2014. ‘Why do We Need Myth-busting in the Study of Sino-Africa Relations?’, Journal of Contemporary China, 23(87): 443–61. https://doi.org/10.1080/10670564.2013.843889

Hirono, M. and M. Xu. 2013. ‘China’s Military Operations Other than War: The UK Experience and Opportunities for the West’, RUSI Journal, 158(6): 74–82. https://doi.org/10.1080/03071847.2013.869726

Hirono, M. 2013. ‘Three Legacies of Humanitarianism in China’, Disasters, 37(S2): S202–S220. https://doi.org/10.1111/disa.12022

Hirono, M. 2011. ‘China’s Charm Offensive and Peacekeeping: The Lessons of Cambodia—What Now for Sudan?’, International Peacekeeping, 18(3): 328–43. https://doi.org/10.1080/13533312.2011.563097

Hirono, M. and M. Lanteigne. 2011. ‘Introduction: China and UN Peacekeeping’, International Peacekeeping, 18(3): 243–56. https://doi.org/10.1080/13533312.2011.563070

Hirono, M. 2011. ‘Another “Complementarity” in Sino-Australian Security Cooperation’, Contemporary International Relations, 21(3): 103–36. https://www.academia.edu/1414860/Another_Complementarity_in_Sino_Australian_Security_Cooperation
