= Teenage Mutant Ninja Turtles (1987 TV series) =

American animated television series

- Also known as: Teenage Mutant Hero Turtles
- Genre: Science fiction; Superhero; Action-adventure; Comedy drama
- Based on: Characters by Kevin Eastman and Peter Laird
- Story by: Jack Mendelsohn (seasons 1–3, 6–7); David Wise (seasons 4–5, 8–9); Jeffrey Scott (season 10)
- Directed by: Fred Wolf (seasons 1–6); Bill Wolf (season 3); Bruno-Rene Huchez (season 7); Bill Hutten (season 7); Tony Love (seasons 7–10); Susan Blu; Maitzi Morgan (seasons 2–4); Cindy Akers (seasons 5–6)
- Creative directors: Peter Chung (seasons 1–3); Gary Selvaggio (seasons 4–5); Frank Rocco (seasons 6–7); George Goodchild (seasons 8–9); Kyle Menke (season 10)
- Voices of: Cam Clarke; Rob Paulsen; Barry Gordon; Townsend Coleman; Peter Renaday; Renae Jacobs; James Avery; Pat Fraley; Jennifer Darling; Jim Cummings; Tony Jay
- Theme music composer: Chuck Lorre; Dennis C. Brown
- Composers: Dennis C. Brown; Chuck Lorre (seasons 1-4)
- Country of origin: United States
- Original language: English
- No. of seasons: 10
- No. of episodes: 193 (list of episodes)

Production
- Executive producers: Mark Freedman (seasons 2–10); Sung Chul Ha (seasons 4–5)
- Producers: Walt Kubiak (seasons 2–7); Fred Wolf; Osamu Yoshioka (seasons 1–3); Rudy Zamora (seasons 1–2); Andy Luckey (seasons 3–7); Bill Wolf (season 8–10); Kara Vallow (seasons 8–10)
- Running time: 22–23 minutes
- Production companies: Fred Wolf Films (Note: Credited as Murakami-Wolf-Swenson until 1992.); Murakami-Wolf Dublin (seasons 4–5); Toei Animation (seasons 1–3); Playmates Toys (seasons 1–2); Group W Productions (seasons 1–9)

Original release
- Network: Syndication (1987–1991); CBS (1990–1996)
- Release: December 28, 1987 – November 2, 1996

Teenage Mutant Ninja Turtles (also known as Teenage Mutant Hero Turtles in some regions) is an American animated television series produced by Fred Wolf Films and based on the comic book characters created by Kevin Eastman and Peter Laird. Set in New York City, the series follows the adventures of the eponymous Teenage Mutant Ninja Turtles and their allies as they battle the Shredder, Krang, and numerous other villains and criminals. The property was changed considerably from the darker-toned comics, to make it more suitable for children and families.

The pilot was shown during the week of December 28, 1987, in syndication as a five-part miniseries, and the show began its full-time run on October 1, 1988, and ended on November 2, 1996. The show was the first television appearance of the Teenage Mutant Ninja Turtles, and helped launch the characters into mainstream popularity, becoming one of the most popular animated series in television history. Action figures, breakfast cereals, plush toys, and other merchandise featuring the characters appeared on the market during the late 1980s and early 1990s and became top sellers worldwide. By 1990, the series was being shown daily on more than 125 television stations.

Characters from the show have been included in crossovers with later entries of the franchise, including the 2009 film Turtles Forever and recurring roles in the 2012 TV series for Nickelodeon.

== Series overview ==
Season	Episodes	Originally released		
Season	Episodes	First released	Last released	Network
1	5	December 28, 1987	January 1, 1988	Syndication
2	13	October 1, 1988	December 24, 1988	Syndication
3	47	September 25, 1989	December 15, 1989	Syndication
4	41	September 8, 1990	March 29, 1991	Syndication (15 episodes); CBS (26 episodes)
5	20	September 14, 1991	November 16, 1991	CBS
6	16	September 19, 1992	November 7, 1992	CBS
7	27	September 18, 1993	October 30, 1993	CBS
8	8	September 17, 1994	November 5, 1994	CBS
9	8	September 16, 1995	November 4, 1995	CBS
10	8	September 14, 1996	November 2, 1996	CBS

=== Seasons 1–7 ===
The origins story in the 1987 television series deviates significantly from the original Mirage Studios comics. In this version, Splinter was formerly human, an honorable ninja master named Hamato Yoshi who studied art history as a hobby. He was banished from the Foot Clan (a Japanese dynasty of ninjas founded by one of his distant ancestors) after one of his students, the power-hungry and seditious Oroku Saki (who resented Yoshi's leadership within the clan and aspired to usurp him), set him up for an offense against a visiting master sensei. Disgraced, Yoshi was forced to leave his native Japan and relocate to New York City, where he began living in the sewers with the rats as his only friends. Saki was given command of the Foot Clan, which he corrupted and transformed into a criminal organization.

Sometime later, Yoshi adopted four turtles after they were accidentally dropped into the sewers by a young boy named Chester Manley. He returned from his explorations around New York City one day to find the turtles covered with a strange glowing ooze. This substance caused the turtles, who were most recently exposed to Yoshi, to become humanoid, while Yoshi, who was most recently exposed to sewer rats, became a humanoid rat, and was given the name "Splinter" by the turtles. Yoshi raises the four turtles as his sons and trains them in the art of ninjitsu. He names them Leonardo, Donatello, Raphael and Michelangelo, after his favorite Italian Renaissance artists.

Oroku Saki eventually leaves Japan and tracks Yoshi to New York City, where he intends to destroy him once and for all. It is also around this time that he begins working with Krang, a disembodied alien brain from Dimension X who ruled his native realm with an iron fist until he was stripped of his body and banished to Earth. Saki takes on a new pseudonym, "The Shredder", donning a suit covered with razor spikes, and complemented by a long purple cape, a metal samurai helmet, and a metal mask over his mouth. Since leaving Japan, his ambitions have grown from usurping leadership of the Foot Clan to world domination. To this end, Krang provides the Shredder with a vast array of powerful technology from Dimension X, including the Technodrome, and funds most of his schemes throughout the series.

It becomes clear early on in the series that the mutagen which transformed the Turtles and Splinter into their new forms was dumped into the sewers by Shredder in an effort to murder Yoshi, as he had mistakenly believed it to be a deadly poison rather than a transformative agent. After several years of training under Splinter, the Turtles set out to find whoever is responsible for their transformation, and upon learning that Shredder was behind it, they vow to put an end to his ongoing criminal career and restore Splinter back to his human form. Along the way, they rescue and befriend Channel 6 news reporter April O'Neil, who becomes one of their strongest allies and later on her best friend Irma Langenstein. The Turtles, who had rarely left the sewers prior to meeting April, also began to take on the role of semi-vigilante crime fighters. Despite this, they frequently have to deal with citizens misunderstanding them, largely due to the efforts of Channel 6 newsmen Burne Thompson and Vernon Fenwick, who both distrust the Turtles and frequently and wrongfully blame them for the trouble that Shredder and Krang cause. As a result, they mainly have to rely on April (either via Turtle-com, or Channel 6 news reports) and her colleague and girlfriend Irma to inform them of crimes in the city, and to counteract Burne and Vernon's smear and bad-tempered campaigns against them with her own news coverage of the Turtles, portraying them as a force for good. Reluctant to expose themselves to the outside world, the Turtles initially wear disguises whenever they leave the sewers, although this is slowly relaxed as the series progresses and they gain the trust of the broader populace, whom they have saved from Shredder and other villains on many occasions.

Shredder, Krang, Bebop & Rocksteady, Baxter Stockman, and their legions of Foot soldiers repeatedly try to destroy the Turtles and take over the world. Much of their quest for world domination hinges on repowering Krang's mobile fortress, the Technodrome, and bringing it to the Earth's surface, as it was either buried deep under New York City (Season 1), stuck in Dimension X (Seasons 2 and 4), embedded in the Earth's core (Season 3), stranded in the Arctic (Season 5), or at the bottom of the Arctic Ocean (Seasons 6 and 7). However, their plans always fail, often landing the villains in humorous predicaments. Some episodes feature other minor villains, such as the Rat King, Leatherhead, Slash, General Traag and Granitor, and many others, or involve the TMNT getting themselves and the city out of a mess that they had inadvertently caused.

Season 7 marked a tonal and stylistic shift for the series. Compared to earlier seasons, The storytelling focused more heavily on action and adventure, moving away from the lighter, comedic tone that characterized much of the earlier syndicated episodes.

The season is notable for introducing a slightly darker atmosphere, while still retaining the humor and charm of the franchise. Many episodes in Season 7 continued to develop the overarching narrative involving the Turtles’ battle against Shredder and the Technodrome, culminating in a satisfying conclusion to several long-running story arcs.

==== Vacation in Europe ====
Season 7 featured a "Vacation in Europe" side-season that took place during the fourth season where the Turtles, April, Splinter, and Irma win a vacation in Europe and end up fighting Shredder, Krang, and other villains across Europe.

=== Seasons 8–10 ===
In the last three seasons, the show went through dramatic changes. The humor was toned down significantly, the animation became darker, the color of the sky in each episode was changed to a continuous, ominous dark-red sky (commonplace with newer action-oriented children's programming at the time), the theme song was changed, the introduction sequence added in clips from the first live-action film, and the show took on a darker, more action-oriented atmosphere, reminiscent to the original comics. (These seasons are referred to as the "Red Sky seasons" or "Red Sky years" by fans.) The Turtles' demeanor evolved into a more serious and determined one than in prior seasons, and they devoted most of their time to tracking down villains. The series' main antagonists—Shredder, Krang, Bebop, and Rocksteady—who had previously been depicted as dangerous but comically inept villains, were now portrayed as a more menacing, unified threat. Additionally, Krang was revealed to have seized power in Dimension X through numerous betrayals and widespread destruction, resulting in old enemies seeking vengeance. Many recurring characters and villains were written out of the show by this point, with more focus placed on the main cast. The eighth season was also noted for the destruction of the Channel 6 building, which led to April working freelance.

At the end of the seventh season, the Turtles sent the Technodrome through a portal into Dimension X, but without Shredder, Krang, Bebop, and Rocksteady. As a result, the villains were stranded on Earth without any weapons or power, and were forced to work out of an old science building until they could find a way back into Dimension X to retrieve the Technodrome. The Turtles, taking advantage of the situation, pursue their arch enemies relentlessly in an effort to put an end to their schemes once and for all. Eventually, Shredder and Krang, along with Bebop and Rocksteady, build a new portal into Dimension X and reclaim the Technodrome, although the Turtles manage to track them down with the help of Gargon, a mutated resident of Dimension X who was being held prisoner by Shredder and Krang. At the end of Season 8, the TMNT finally banish Shredder, Krang, Bebop, and Rocksteady to Dimension X by destroying the Technodrome's engines and trans-dimensional portal, preventing them from returning to Earth.

From Season 9 onwards, Lord Dregg, an evil alien warlord from Dimension X, appeared as the new lead villain. He begins a propaganda campaign against the Turtles, turning the general population against them and in favor of him and his forces. Although Dregg is outed as a villain at the end of Season 9, the Turtles are never able to regain the trust of the broader population, due to an earlier smear campaign by Burne and Vernon that wrongfully blamed the Turtles for the destruction of the Channel 6 building. Additionally, the Turtles began to suffer from secondary mutations that temporarily transformed them into monstrous hulks with diminished intelligence, a problem that would not be completely resolved until Season 10. The TMNT also gain a new ally in the form of Carter, a brash African American male who initially sought out Master Splinter for training in ninjitsu, but is eventually exposed to mutagen and contracts an incurable mutation disease.

In the final season of the series, Dregg's sycophantic henchman Mung encounters Shredder and Krang, who are still stranded in Dimension X. They told him that they had battled the Turtles for years, but even though Shredder claimed to have destroyed them, Mung knew that he was lying. Soon afterward, Mung returns to Dregg's ship and informs him of their encounter, and Dregg decides to bring both Shredder and Krang back from Dimension X to help him fight the Turtles. However, the pair immediately rebel against Dregg and leave, continuing on where they left off before they were banished at the end of Season 8. Back on Earth, Shredder and Krang kidnap April O'Neil and do battle with the Turtles once more, although they are all soon transported back to Dregg's lair. The Turtles initially have the upper hand in the fight, but Shredder and Krang are able to subdue them after reluctantly agreeing to work with Dregg. As he prepares to drain the Turtles of their life energies, Shredder and Krang betray Lord Dregg and force him onto one of the operating tables, intending to drain both him and the Turtles of their power. Dregg, however, manages to escape and uses his microbots to capture Shredder and Krang. Although he successfully drains the Turtles and Krang of their life energies, Shredder breaks free before Dregg is able to take anything from him. Shredder spends the next two episodes finding a way to heal Krang and dispose of Dregg so that they may take control of his armies and conquer the Earth, but in the ensuing confrontation they are permanently transported back to Dimension X. Carter also bids farewell to the Turtles as he travels to the future to look for a cure for his mutation. In the final episode of the series, Michaelangelo and Donatello travel to Dimension X to retrieve Krang's mechanical body from the (now abandoned and completely destroyed) Technodrome, which is sitting on a hill standing upright (whereas at the end of Season 8, an alien plant had dragged it down into a deep pit), suggesting that Shredder and Krang initially tried to repair the Technodrome before declaring it a lost cause. Shredder, Krang, Bebop, and Rocksteady are nowhere to be seen. The Turtles eventually find Krang's suit and use it in a final confrontation with Dregg, which ends with the Turtles banishing Dregg to Dimension X. Splinter congratulates the Turtles on their victory and, now that all of their enemies have been vanquished, states that he has nothing more to teach them, calling them his equals.

=== Subsequent works ===
In 2009, the Turtles, Shredder, Krang, and various other characters from the 1987 series returned for the 25th-anniversary crossover movie Turtles Forever, in which they meet up with their counterparts from the 2003 TV series. Due to financial restrictions, none of the original voice actors were able to reprise their roles, and replacement actors were used.

In April 2013, Ciro Nieli, the executive producer of the 2012 Turtles series, confirmed in an interview that the 1987 Turtles would cameo in a one-hour special in season 2. Cam Clarke, Townsend Coleman, Barry Gordon, and Rob Paulsen (who voiced Donatello in the 2012 series) reprise their roles as Leonardo, Michelangelo, Donatello, and Raphael, respectively, in the closing of the episode "Wormquake!". The 1987 turtles also had a crossover with the 2012 turtles in the season 4 episode, "Trans-Dimensional Turtles". In addition with the lead cast members reprising their roles from the episode, Pat Fraley also reprised his role as Krang who is depicted as a relative of Kraang Subprime that was banished to Earth in the 1980s reality for being incompetent. The 1987 turtles also returned during season five of the 2012 series for a three-part special, "Wanted: Bebop and Rocksteady", along with the original Shredder, Foot soldiers, Krang, Technodrome, and both Bebop and Rocksteady. Both Gordon and Clarke reprised their roles as Bebop and Rocksteady, while the Shredder is voiced by the 2012 incarnation's voice actor Kevin Michael Richardson, due to James Avery's passing in 2013.

== Characters ==
=== Overview ===
Character	Voiced by	Seasons										Specials
Character	Voiced by	1	2	3	4	5	6	7	8	9	10	Specials
Character	Voiced by	1987	1988	1989	1990–91	1991	1992	1993	1994	1995	1996	1990–2017
Teenage Mutant Ninja Turtles
Leonardo	Cam Clarke	Main	Main	Main	Main	Main	Main	Main	Main	Main	Main	Main
Donatello	Barry Gordon (Note: Voiced by Greg Berg in six Season 3 episodes and one episode of the "Vacation in Europe" side-season.)	Main	Main	Main	Main	Main	Main	Main	Main	Main	Main	Main
Raphael	Rob Paulsen (Note: Voiced by Thom Pinto in Season 3, Hal Rayle in the "Vacation in Europe" side-season, and Michael Gough in Season 10.)	Main	Main	Main	Main	Main	Main	Main	Main	Main	Main	Main
Michelangelo	Townsend Coleman	Main	Main	Main	Main	Main	Main	Main	Main	Main	Main	Main
Allies and friends
Hamato Yoshi; Master Splinter	Peter Renaday (Note: Voiced by Townsend Coleman in two Season 5 episodes.)	Main	Main	Main	Main	Main	Main	Main	Main	Main	Main	Main
April O'Neil	Renae Jacobs	Main	Main	Main	Main	Main	Main	Main	Main	Main	Main	Main
Irma Langenstein	Jennifer Darling		Main	Main	Main	Main	Main	Main	Guest			Silent
Carter	Bumper Robinson									Main	Main	
Landor	Kevin Schon									Main	Main	
Merrik	Roxanne Beckford									Main	Main	
Zach "the Fifth Turtle"	Rob Paulsen			Recurring	Guest	Guest		Guest				
Casey Jones	Pat Fraley			Guest		Guest		Guest	Guest			
Punk Frogs	Various (Note: Voiced by Townsend Coleman, Jim Cummings, Pat Fraley, and Nicholas Omana.)		Guest	Guest	Guest	Guest		Guest				
The Neutrinos	Various (Note: Voiced by Thom Pinto, Tress MacNeille, and Pat Fraley.)	Guest	Guest	Guest	Guest			Guest				
Kerma	Jan Rabson					Guest	Guest	Guest				
Villains
Oroku Saki; The Shredder	James Avery (Note: Voiced by Dorian Harewood in four Season 3 episodes, Pat Fraley in one Season 3 episode, Jim Cummings in one Season 5 episode and most of the European side-season; Avery departed the series early in season 7, leading to Townsend Coleman replacing him the remainder of that season, and William E. Martin taking up the role in Season 8 and 10. Kevin Michael Richardson voiced him in the crossover with the 2012 series.)	Main	Main	Main	Main	Main	Main	Main	Main		Guest	Guest
Krang	Pat Fraley (Note: Voiced by Townsend Coleman in four Season 3 episodes.)	Main	Main	Main	Main	Main	Main	Main	Main		Guest	Guest
Rocksteady	Cam Clarke	Main	Main	Main	Main	Main	Main	Main	Main			Guest
Bebop	Barry Gordon (Note: Voiced by Greg Berg in six Season 3 episodes and one episode of the "Vacation in Europe" side-season.)	Main	Main	Main	Main	Main	Main	Main	Main			Guest
Baxter Stockman	Pat Fraley	Guest	Guest	Guest	Guest			Guest				
The Rat King	Townsend Coleman			Recurring	Recurring	Recurring	Recurring	Recurring	Guest			
Lord Dregg	Tony Jay									Main	Main	
Ch'rell; The Utrom Shredder	Scottie Ray											Main
Other characters
Burne Thompson	Pat Fraley (Note: Voiced by Townsend Coleman in three episodes of Season 3.)	Recurring	Recurring	Recurring	Recurring	Recurring	Recurring	Recurring	Recurring			
Vernon Fenwick	Peter Renaday (Note: Originally voiced by Pat Fraley in Season 1, replaced by Peter Renaday for the remainder of the show. Townsend Coleman stood in for one Season 5 episode.)	Recurring	Recurring	Recurring	Recurring	Recurring	Recurring	Recurring	Recurring			

=== Teenage Mutant Ninja Turtles ===
- Leonardo (voiced by Cam Clarke) – The blue-masked turtle who wields two katana. He is the leader and commander of the Turtles and is the closest to Splinter. He is the most serious, level-headed member of the team, who values his leadership.
- Donatello (voiced by Barry Gordon in most episodes, Greg Berg in six Season 3 episodes and one episode of the "Vacation in Europe" side-season) – The purple-masked turtle who wields a bō staff. He is the scientist and intellectual of the team who is constantly tinkering with various inventions. Donatello's capabilities in science and technology have been key factors for the Turtles' successes in their battles with Shredder and other villains.
- Raphael (voiced by Rob Paulsen in Season 1–9, Thom Pinto in two Season 3 episodes, Hal Rayle in the "Vacation in Europe" side-season, Michael Gough in Season 10) – The red-masked turtle who wields two sai. Although Raphael is depicted as angry, impulsive, and violent in most other TMNT media, he is the comedian of the team who often comes out with sarcastic and witty remarks in the 1987 series. He provides some of the comic relief for the show, constantly breaking the fourth wall.
- Michelangelo (voiced by Townsend Coleman) – The orange-masked turtle who wields a pair of nunchakus, which is later changed to a grappling hook. He is the goofy, fun-loving "party animal" of the team who often speaks in surfer slang, and is the source for many of the show's catchphrases, such as "Cowabunga!". More so than any other Turtle, he is obsessed with pizza and enjoys experimenting with various toppings, even when the other Turtles find it gross. He is also considered to be the least intelligent member of the team, especially by Raphael. Michaelangelo is the most laid back character, though he is shown to be very skilled with his nunchaku. He also provides much of the comic relief albeit without Raphael's sarcasm.

=== Allies and friends ===
- Master Splinter/Hamato Yoshi (voiced by Peter Renaday in most appearances, Townsend Coleman in two Season 5 episodes) – A soft-spoken yet strict and wizened sensei who used to teach Oroku Saki, until the latter set him up for an offense towards his master which he did not commit and was exiled from the Foot Clan. Since then, he has lived in the sewers of Manhattan as a homeless man with the rats and his four pet turtles as his only friends. Upon being exposed to the same mutagen that changed the turtles into their present anthropomorphic forms with his DNA, Hamato Yoshi transformed into a humanoid mutant rat (as he had most recently been with the rats) and raised the Turtles as his sons (who nickname him "Splinter" from his habit of breaking wood), training them in ninjutsu. It is later revealed that one of his distant ancestors was the founder of the Foot Clan.
- April O'Neil (voiced by Renae Jacobs) – A redheaded TV reporter from Channel 6 News (later a freelance reporter in Seasons 9 and 10) who discovers the Turtles' home in the sewers and befriends the TMNT. She is frequently kidnapped by Shredder and other villains, usually as bait to lure the Turtles out of hiding.
- Irma Langenstein (voiced by Jennifer Darling) – Channel 6's clumsy, dating-obsessed secretary who debuts in Season 2. She is April's best friend who later also befriends the TMNT. Following the destruction of the Channel 6 Building in Season 8, Irma is slowly phased out of the show. A similar character would be used in the 2012 series.
- Casey Jones (voiced by Pat Fraley) – A violent, impulsive, and overzealous street-fighting vigilante who is friends with the Ninja Turtles. He fights using sports equipment and wears a hockey mask.
- Zach "the Fifth Turtle" (voiced by Rob Paulsen) – A 14-year-old who looks up to the Turtles and is their biggest fan.
  - Walt (voiced by Townsend Coleman) – Zach's older brother.
- Punk Frogs – The mutant frog counterparts of the TMNT who were accidentally mutated by Krang and trained in martial arts in the hopes that they would be a match for the Turtles. Further emulating his rival Splinter, Shredder names the four frogs after his own personal heroes: Attila the Hun, Genghis Khan, Napoleon Bonaparte, and Grigori Rasputin. Despite their innocent, docile nature, they are also extremely naive, and as such, they were easily misled by Shredder into believing that the Turtles were "evil" and that Shredder was a "good person". However, they eventually turned against Shredder and became their allies. These frogs all speak with Southern American accents.
  - Attila the Frog (voiced by Cam Clarke) – A Punk Frog who wields a mace.
  - Genghis Frog (voiced by Jim Cummings) – A Punk Frog who wields an axe.
  - Napoleon Bonafrog (voiced by Pat Fraley) – A Punk Frog who wields a whip.
  - Rasputin the Mad Frog (voiced by Nicholas Omana) – A Punk Frog who wields a bow and arrow.
- The Neutrinos – An alien race of teenagers from Dimension X whose only goal in life is to have fun.
  - Dask (voiced by Thom Pinto) – A male Neutrino. He spends some time tinkering with his Starmobile.
  - Kala (voiced by Tress MacNeille) – A female Neutrino. She seems to have the strongest friendship with Michelangelo out of all the Turtles.
  - Zak (voiced by Pat Fraley) – A hipster Neutrino.
- Kerma (voiced by Jan Rabson impersonating Cliff Edwards) – A native of the distant utopian planet Shell-Ri-La (the name being a pun on Shangri-La), which is home to a peaceful, but generally defenseless alien humanoid turtles called the Turtleoids. He arrives on Earth to seek for the Turtles' help in protecting his homeworld from a few threats.
- Carter (voiced by Bumper Robinson) – Introduced in Season 9, he travels to New York City to study martial arts under Splinter, but is accidentally exposed to a mutagen which causes him to spontaneously oscillate between his human and mutant forms. He was an important ally to the TMNT in their battles against Lord Dregg. In Season 10, he temporarily leaves to finish his studies after Donatello stabilized his mutation, although he returns upon learning from April that the Turtles were captured by Dregg, Krang, and Shredder. While on his way to rescue the Turtles, Carter found that he could still mutate. At the end of "Turtles to the Second Power", Carter accepts Landor and Merrik's offer to travel with them to the future so he can be fully cured of his mutation.
- Landor and Merrik (voiced by Kevin Schon and Roxanne Beckford) – Two time-travelers from the future.

=== Villains ===
==== Main villains ====
The Shredder, as seen in the series' opening theme sequence, and some Foot soldiers.

- The Foot Clan – An evil ninja organization.
  - Oroku Saki/The Shredder (voiced by James Avery in Season 1 to the first half of Season 7, Dorian Harewood in four Season 3 episodes, Pat Fraley in one Season 3 episode, Jim Cummings in one Season 5 episode and most of the European side-season, Townsend Coleman for the second half of Season 7, and William E. Martin in Season 8 and 10) – The nemesis of the Turtles and Master Splinter. He is usually the main villain in other media, but in this series Shredder always, against his will, has to take orders from Krang, although their relationship evolves over time into more of an equal partnership (with Shredder even risking his life to save Krang on numerous occasions). His real name is Oroku Saki, a member of the Foot Clan in Japan and a student of Hamato Yoshi/Splinter. Saki was jealous of Yoshi's leadership within the Clan and sought to usurp him. He responds by framing Yoshi for an offense towards the sensei and has him exiled. Shortly afterwards, Saki takes control of the Foot Clan and transforms it into an army of crime under his command. Along with Krang, Rocksteady, and Bebop, he is the primary antagonist of the show until the end of Season 8, when the Technodrome is destroyed and they are all banished to Dimension X. Although he and Krang return for three episodes in the final season, they are eventually sent back to Dimension X, and they are not seen again for the rest of the series.
  - Rocksteady (voiced by Cam Clarke) – One of Shredder's incompetent, oafish henchmen. Originally the Caucasian male leader of an unnamed street gang, Rocksteady was mutated into a humanoid black rhinoceros. Like Bebop, he is extremely unintelligent (although he is shown on multiple occasions to be slightly more intelligent than Bebop) and serves as comic relief for most of the series.
  - Bebop (voiced by Barry Gordon in most episodes, Greg Berg in six Season 3 episodes and one episode of the "Vacation in Europe" side-season) – An African-American male with a mohawk, sunglasses, and a nose ring who, along with Rocksteady, is one of Shredder's henchmen. Prior to meeting Shredder, he belonged to the same street gang as Rocksteady, serving as the latter's second-in-command. As part of Shredder and Krang's experiment, he was transformed into a humanoid common warthog.
  - Baxter Stockman (voiced by Pat Fraley) – A blond Caucasian inventor (as opposed to the dark-haired African-American he was portrayed as in the Mirage comics) who tried to bill his rat-catching Mousers to the Ajax Pest Control company. They did not like his suggestion, saying it would put them out of business, and threw him out of the building. Embittered, he readily agrees to join forces with Shredder, who orders him to replicate his Mousers and hunt down Splinter and the Turtles. After the Ninja Turtles defeated the Mousers, Baxter Stockman was arrested and thrown into an asylum. Shredder later traded Stockman to Krang for the return of Bebop and Rocksteady. When Krang found no use for Stockman and decided to kill him, a fly that had been with Baxter in the disintegrator unit soon merged with him, turning him into a humanoid fly. He has occasionally plotted revenge against the Ninja Turtles and Shredder. Baxter Stockman has a twin brother named Barney who was also a mad scientist and threw fits whenever the Turtles mistook him for Baxter.
    - Z (voiced by Townsend Coleman) – A sentient computer found on an abandoned spaceship who allied with Baxter Stockman.
  - Chrome Dome (voiced by Peter Renaday) – A towering robot who was created by Shredder to keep an eye on the Foot Soldiers in the episode "Planet of the Turtleoids". It was destroyed during its fight with the Turtles. In "Night of the Rogues", Chrome Dome was rebuilt by Shredder and is among the villains who Shredder recruited to attack the Turtles.
  - Foot Soldiers – A group of robotic ninjas who serve Shredder.
- Krang (voiced by Pat Fraley in most episodes, Townsend Coleman in three Season 3 episodes) – An extremely intelligent, disembodied brain from Dimension X who commands the Technodrome. Like Shredder, he aspires to conquer the Earth, although he does not share Shredder's obsessive hatred of the Turtles and Splinter (instead of viewing them as more of an annoyance/obstacle), preferring instead to focus on world conquest. He funds and helps plan most of Shredder's schemes, although they often bicker with one another over tactics. In Season 7, it is revealed that Krang was originally a Tyrannosaurus-like creature with regenerative powers before he lost his body and was banished from Dimension X.
  - Rock Soldiers – The Rock Soldiers are an army of sentient rock humanoids from Dimension X. As mentioned in "Michaelangelo's Birthday," the Rock Soldiers were created when Krang used mutagen on some rocks. The Rock Soldiers are incredibly strong, but they are not very bright.
    - General Traag (voiced by Peter Renaday) – Traag is a Rock Soldier general who is loyal to Krang.
    - Sergeant Granitor (voiced by Pat Fraley impersonating Peter Lorre) – Granitor is a high-ranking gray Rock Soldier who is loyal to Krang and works under General Traag.
- Lord Dregg (voiced by Tony Jay) – An alien warlord who serves as the chief antagonist for the final two seasons of the series, following Shredder and Krang's exile to Dimension X in Season 8. At the end of the final season, Dregg is banished to Dimension X as well. Although he starts out as a cold, calm, and calculating villain, his sanity gradually deteriorates over the course of Season 10, as he becomes increasingly obsessed with destroying the Turtles once and for all. In the process, he alienates all of his remaining followers, including his second-in-command Mung, who accuses him of losing sight of their quest for world domination.
  - HiTech (voiced by Rob Paulsen in Season 9, Cam Clarke in Season 10) – An arthropod-like alien in high-tech armor who served as Dregg's second-in-command. When Mung proves more efficient as second-in-command, Dregg blasts HiTech off in a pod to "orbit the galaxy".
  - Mung (voiced by Cam Clarke) – A hunchbacked beetle-like henchman of Dregg who replaced HiTech in the final season. He is a technical and mechanical genius where he even surpasses HiTech himself. Mung usually supplies Dregg with his self-replicating "microbots" to build whatever he wants in a matter of hours.
  - TechnoGang – A gang of insect-like foot soldiers who serve Dregg.
  - Batmen – A group of ugly winged humanoid bats who serve as the alternate foot soldiers for Dregg.

==== Recurring villains ====
- The Street Gang – A street gang that Bebop and Rocksteady lead. It is loosely based on the Purple Dragons from the comics.
  - Scrag – A member of Bebop and Rocksteady's faction with wild red hair and wears sunglasses. He got mutated into a mutant bat. Scrag's name came from the original storyboard for "Turtle Tracks" and a coloring book.
  - Grunt – A member of Bebop and Rocksteady's faction who sports a yellow mohawk and wears sunglasses. He got mutated into a mutant lizard. His name came from the original storyboard for "Turtle Tracks."
  - Dopey – A cap-wearing big-nosed member of Bebop and Rocksteady's faction who got partially-mutated into a mutant elephant where he sported an elephant trunk and an enlarged right arm. His name came from the original storyboard for "Turtle Tracks."
  - Dumbo – A short, fat, and bald-headed member of Bebop and Rocksteady's faction who got mutated into a mutant three-toed sloth. His name came from the original storyboard for "Turtle Tracks."
- Lugnut's Gang - There is the street gang that is led by Lugnut who Bebop and Rocksteady's faction are associated with. It is also loosely based on the Purple Dragons from the comics.
  - Lugnut (voiced by Townsend Coleman in "The Gang's All Here," Nicholas Omana in "Once Upon a Time Machine") – The bald-headed leader of the gang that Rocksteady and Bebop's faction are a part of.
  - Jersey Red (voiced by Renae Jacobs) – A tough woman who is a member of Lugnut's faction.
  - High Five (voiced by Rob Paulsen) – A member of Lugnut's faction.
- The Rat King (voiced by Townsend Coleman) – A homeless man living in a dilapidated portion of the New York City sewer system, not too far from the Turtles and Splinter. He usually carries around a hypnotic flute to mesmerize any rodent nearby, especially mutant rats. In these episodes featuring him, the Rat King would often enact some sort of plot to establish his own rat-controlled government and end human rule forever, thus believing that all rats (which he counted himself as) were more superior than every other species, whom he described as "inferior non-rodents". The Rat King appeared as a recurring villain from Seasons 3 to 7 onwards, until he is finally apprehended by the police in the second episode of Season 8.
- Leatherhead (voiced by Jim Cummings in three appearances, Peter Renaday in "Night of the Rogues") – A large alligator from Florida who has mutated into humanoid form when he swam through a mutagen-polluted part of his swamp. He hunted the Turtles' allies the Punk Frogs, and then went to New York to hunt the Turtles themselves. One time, he fights the Rat King, but join forces with him in later episodes.
- Slash (voiced by Pat Fraley) – An ordinary turtle from Earth who was mutated by Bebop and Rocksteady. He is a muscular, vicious humanoid turtle with brute strength, dynamic durability, spikes on his shell, vortex breath, hardened claws, and a pair of Shaolin swords, but very low intelligence (although he does temporarily acquire a genius-level IQ in his second appearance). Slash is also extremely attached to a small, plastic palm tree standing inside the bowl prior before exposure of super mutagen and calls it his "binky".
- Organised crime figures - The Teenage Mutant Ninja Turtles have gone up against different members of Manhattan's criminal underworld.
  - Don Turtelli (voiced by Peter Renaday) - A crime boss known for using feathers to tickle his victims' feet.
  - Pinky McFingers (voiced by Peter Renaday in most appearances, Cam Clarke in "Donatello's Duplicate") – A high-ranking crime boss with a gang at his disposal. McFingers once sponsors Baxter Stockman's twin brother Barney Stockman to create a "gag-a-magnifier" device that increases the comedy power of jokes. They planned to hook up the funniest comedian to it and transmit the joke waves all over the city, making everyone hysterically helpless. This enabled McFingers and his two goons would go out and rob the city. He and his men kidnapped comedians until they kidnapped Raphael. They tied Raphael up in a sack and took him to their hideout where strapped down, McFingers tells him of his brilliant plan. Being the funniest comedian, Raphael is forced to start telling his jokes. However, the rest of the turtles rescue him and the other comedians and turn the device against Stockman and the McFingers gang, all of whom end up arrested.
  - Big Louie (voiced by Peter Renaday) – A high-ranking gangster with a gang at his disposal who sometimes works with the Shredder.
  - Mad Dog McMutt (voiced by Townsend Coleman) - A bulldog-like human gangster. His secret headquarters is a giant fire hydrant and he has a dog-shaped car and helicopter.
- Tempestra (voiced by Gaille Heideman) – A sorceress from the arcade game "Tempestra's Revenge" who was brought out by a freak thunderstorm. She possesses telekinetic powers, can create different creatures to fight for her, and can control the weather. After Leonardo encountered Tempestra upon playing the arcade game, he called in the rest of the Turtles to fight her. Tempestra was defeated when Leonardo trapped her in the circuit board from the wrecked arcade game. In "Night of the Rogues", Tempestra was freed offscreen by Shredder who is among the villains used by him and Krang to destroy the Turtles where she was the one who led them. Tempestra has also appeared in three video games associated with this show.
- Groundchuck and Dirtbag (voiced by Robert Ridgely and Pat Fraley) – A mutant red-furred cattle in armor and a mutant mole who were accidentally created by Shredder's mutagen due a series of events caused by Kerma.
- H.A.V.O.C. – Short for Highly Advanced Variety Of Creatures, H.A.V.O.C. is a gang of mutants. The Turtles meet H.A.V.O.C. in the process of thwarting a robbery, meeting mutants and H.A.V.O.C. members Raptor, Amok, and Overdrive, and then later, the H.A.V.O.C. leader, Titanus. The Turtles find out that while H.A.V.O.C. has offered the Turtles a safe haven from those who think they are the villains, H.A.V.O.C. is actually creating mutants instead of protecting them and actually tries to turn the entire city into mutants. The Turtles spend a few episodes of season 8 battling H.A.V.O.C. After they get rid of the boss, none of the other mutants appear again.
  - Titanus (voiced by Ron Feinberg) – A large unspecified mutant from the future who is the leader of H.A.V.O.C. In his final appearance, he ends up trapped in the time of dinosaurs and vows to have revenge against the Turtles if it is the last thing he ever does.
  - Amok (voiced by Townsend Coleman) – A mutant goat.
  - Highbeam (voiced by Rob Paulsen) – A mutant firefly.
  - Magma (voiced by Barry Gordon) – A lava mutant. He and Seizure were ordered by Titanus to make mutants.
  - Overdrive (voiced by Cam Clarke) – A mutant cheetah.
  - Ram Mystic (voiced by Rob Paulsen) – An unnamed ram mutant with mystical powers.
  - Raptor (voiced by Pat Fraley) – An unspecified mutant bird of prey.
  - Seizure (voiced by Rodger Bumpass) – A mutant centipede. He and Magma were ordered by Titanus to make mutants.
  - Synapse (voiced by Pat Fraley) – A convict who desired revenge against the Turtles since they defeated him in "Get Shredder." In H.A.V.O.C. in the Streets, Titanus breaks him out of jail and turns him into an electric mutant. Synapse keeps the Turtles busy for a while until Donatello forces him through a ham radio, leaving him trapped on the radio airwaves.

=== Other characters ===
- Channel 6 News Staff – The workers of Channel 6 News that often have involvements with the Ninja Turtles. Following the destruction of the Channel 6 News building during Season 8, these characters slowly faded out of the series. The old Channel 6 building also made a cameo appearance in the crossover movie Turtles Forever as the 2003 Turtles take a detour in the dimension of their 1987 counterparts.
  - Burne Thompson (voiced by Pat Fraley in most episodes, Townsend Coleman in three episodes of Season 3) – April's stubborn and irascible boss at Channel 6 News, and the human antagonist of the Turtles. He wrongfully believed the Turtles were a "menace" and bullied April to expose them since he usually had to pay for the damages caused by the Turtles' battles. His hatred for the TMNT intensified following the destruction of the Channel 6 building by Shredder in Season 8, an incident he falsely blamed on the Turtles. He often favored Vernon more, which was likely due to the fact that Vernon shared Burne's distrust of the TMNT and did not hesitate to cast a negative light on them in his news coverage. In the 2014 Teenage Mutant Ninja Turtles film, a genderbent adaption of this character named Bernadette Thompson was used where she was portrayed by Whoopi Goldberg.
  - Vernon Fenwick (voiced by Pat Fraley in Season 1, Peter Renaday in Seasons 2–8 and Townsend Coleman in one Season 5 episode) – April's cameraman, rival news reporter, and the second human antagonist of the Turtles. In Season 1, he had more of a serious and dedicated personality, although shades of the cowardice and rivalry with April that would define Vernon's character throughout the rest of the series would sometimes surface. Despite that, he was still willing to help April get her story in the Season 1 finale, "Shredded and Splintered". From Season 2 onwards, he was written as a selfish, egotistical, opportunistic, and cowardly cameraman and co-reporter who would often go to great lengths to steal April's thunder, although he was quick to cede all of the more "dangerous" assignments to April, not willing to put himself in harm's way. Like Burne, he also wrongfully believed that the Turtles were a menace to society and often actively participated in Burne's anti-mutant campaigns, even though the Turtles had saved his life on many occasions. Vern appears in the 2014 TMNT film and its 2016 sequel portrayed by Will Arnett.

== Production ==
=== Development and writing ===
By 1986, the Teenage Mutant Ninja Turtles comic series by Kevin Eastman and Peter Laird had experienced two years of success. At that time, New York-based licensing agent Mark Freedman – who had previously handled Hanna-Barbera's library of characters and was establishing his own licensing company – was contacted by a connection in the toy industry and introduced to the property. Though initially in disbelief at the title, he found it growing on him and decided to approach California toy manufacturer Playmates Toys to pitch a toy line based on the property. The uncertain company requested that a television deal be acquired first, and after the initial five-episode series debuted, they released their first series of Ninja Turtles action figures in the summer of 1988. The two media would correspond in marketing and popularity for many years to come.

David Wise and Patti Howeth wrote the screenplay for the first 5-part miniseries. When the series continued in the second season, comic artist Jack Mendelsohn joined the show as the executive story editor, and collaborated on story concepts and additional characters with John Schulte and John Besmehn of PANGEA, who were writing presentation scripts, background stories, and character bios for their client, Playmates Toys. Wise went on to write over seventy episodes of the series, and was executive story editor for four later seasons as well. Wise left the series partway through the ninth season, and Jeffrey Scott took over as the story editor and chief writer for the rest of the show's run.

The animation work for the first three seasons of the show were handled by Japanese anime studio Toei Animation, which also co-produced these seasons. The budget for the first five episodes of the series was almost $2 million. Animation was generally produced overseas; with some episodes being produced at Murakami-Wolf-Swenson's satellite studio in Dublin, Ireland.

=== Voice acting ===
Casting for the show took place in Los Angeles. During recording of the voice acting, all the main cast recorded together. According to Renae Jacobs, voice-actress of the reporter April O'Neil, working together "was great for camaraderie and relationships. We played off each other...there was a lot of ad libbing".

Also according to Jacobs, the actors frequently undermined the efforts of the show's creators to make the show grittier and more serious, instead embracing silliness and jokes for both children and adults.

"They [the Turtle voice actors] were kind of like the Marx Brothers, The Stooges, Laurel & Hardy, Burns and Allen and all of those wonderful, fabulous old radio personalities and early movie personalities all rolled up into one. Those guys put the heart and soul into those turtles and came up with those personalities".

— Renae Jacobs, Interview

== Soundtrack ==
Through most of the series, the episodes featured a recurring background music which reflected the mood of the situation, as well as leitmotifs for settings such as the Technodrome, the New York City sewers, Channel 6, etc. The soundtrack was composed by Dennis Challen Brown (credited as "D.C. Brown" and later as "Dennis C. Brown"), with the theme song co-written by Chuck Lorre, who later became a successful television producer. Lorre and Brown were given a $2,000 budget and a 48-hour deadline to record and produce the theme song, with the former claiming in an interview that they were given the job after members of The Turtles backed out of doing it. Lorre recorded the theme song, and performed the spoken parts, while Brown did the "Heroes in a half-shell" insert. The lead vocalist on the track was James Mandell (aka Miles Doppler).

== Broadcast and release ==
=== Syndication ===
The show was in Saturday morning syndication from October 1, 1988, to September 9, 1989, and became an instant hit. The show was expanded to five days a week and aired weekday afternoons in syndication in most markets from September 25, 1989, to March 29, 1991, with reruns airing until September 17, 1993. Starting on September 8, 1990 (with a different opening sequence), the show began its secondary run on CBS's Saturday morning lineup, beginning as a 60-minute block from 1990 to 1993, initially airing a couple of Saturday exclusive episodes back to back. There would also be a brief "Turtle Tips" segment in between the two episodes which served as public service announcements about the environment or other issues. There were at least 20 "Turtle Tips" segments that were produced and aired. Beginning in 1994, the show began airing as a 30-minute block until the series ended.

Although the last episode broadcast on CBS on November 2, 1996, reruns of Seasons 8, 9 and 10 continued to air until August 23, 1997. That would be the last time the show would be reran on any television network in the United States for almost 26 years. Episodes from Seasons 1–7 were rerun on the USA Network's USA Cartoon Express from September 13, 1993, to September 15, 1996 (the last time any episode from prior to Seasons 8-10 would air on television in the United States for nearly 27 years). Fred Wolf Films, owners of the rights to the show, have licensed the series to Lionsgate Home Entertainment, who have been responsible for the original DVD and retail streaming releases.

On July 20, 2023, at San Diego Comic-Con, it was announced that to coincide with the release of Teenage Mutant Ninja Turtles: Mutant Mayhem, Nickelodeon had acquired the broadcast rights to the series from Fred Wolf Films. With the acquisition, the series would become available on Nickelodeon's branded channels and other digital platforms later that month, starting with Nicktoons on July 31, 2023.

On January 15, 2025, it was announced that the series would begin airing on MeTV Toons later that year. The series premiered on that network on September 15, 2025.

=== International releases ===
- In Australia, the show's original run on the Seven Network ended in 1992. From 2013 to 2020, reruns aired on 10 Peach, Currently aired on Nickelodeon in August 2023, Everynight at 11pm and repeat every weekdays at 3pm.
  - Despite being a PAL region, the series always aired under the US “Ninja” title in Australia. The first season of the show premiered as a two-part (90 minutes each) prime-time miniseries on the Seven Network in February 1990 before shifting to a 4:00 p.m. timeslot for Season 2. Later, after ratings fell, it was moved to a morning timeslot in January 1994 as part of Agro's Cartoon Connection until its end in 1996. The show was mostly uncensored, airing under its original name with occasional edits, including the editing of Season 1.
- In New Zealand the series first screened on TV3 from November 27, 1989, the day TV3 began official transmission. Season 2 and 3 were repeated several times over in 1990. Season 1 aired as lost episodes which screened on Saturday evenings at 6:00 p.m. between September and October 1990. Season 4 was picked up in 1991 with TV3 first screening the episodes that aired in the US on CBS followed by the syndicated episodes. From 1992 to 1996 TV3 screened the later seasons on Saturday mornings, the "Vacation in Europe" episodes were screened in 1993.
- In the Republic of Ireland, the series ended its original run on August 9, 1998, but the show was regularly rerun on RTÉ Two until 2008. In Yugoslavia the series was broadcast on RTS from 1991 to 1994 and on RTV Pink from 1998 to 2002. In Denmark, the show is aired every weekday at 6.00 am on TV 2.
  - In the Republic of Ireland, the series was initially known as Teenage Mutant Ninja Turtles just like the US version and the intro sequence was unedited when it debuted on RTÉ2 as part of the Irish TV strand The Den with the airing of the second season in September 1990. After the first two episodes were broadcast, the name was changed to the Hero Turtles version and the intro was edited, except for season one. Scenes with Mikey's nunchucks and the word ‘ninja’ were always edited out in the actual episodes, though. Episodes were also cut a bit midway through at the point where there would be a commercial break, perhaps because there were no ad breaks during shows on The Den. The show was very popular in Ireland and aired a lot on weekday afternoons on RTÉ in the mid 90s with season 1 being placed between 3 and 4. The European Vacation eps first aired in Ireland in December 1990. In 2007–2008, episodes were aired in their original US unedited form.
- In the United Kingdom, the series premiered on January 3, 1990, on BBC One under the name Teenage Mutant Hero Turtles (TMHT). This was due to the controversy surrounding ninjas and related weapons such as nunchaku at the time. The intro sequence was heavily edited because of this, replacing the word ninja with hero or fighting, using a digitally faded logo instead of the animated blob, and removing any scenes in which Michaelangelo wields his nunchaku, replacing them with clips from the show. Scenes of Michaelangelo using his nunchaku were likewise edited out of the episodes themselves, which led the American show runners to drop the weapons from the series entirely in the fourth season in order to make the show more appropriate for the international airings. The weapons were replaced with a grappling hook called the "Turtle Line" that served as Mikey's signature weapon for the rest of the show's run. The word 'ninja' was also edited out of any speech within the show, often leading to some awkward sounding dialogue. The BBC initially aired the series until 1993, when Sky UK obtained the broadcasting rights for the series. The series the continued to air in the United Kingdom from 1993 onwards on Sky One, starting from the fifth season - however, Sky UK reverted back to the original Teenage Mutant Ninja Turtles (TMNT) title, and all further episodes were shown in their original, unedited forms. After the final season ended in 1996, from 1997 onwards the series returned to the BBC in the UK, who repeated some episodes sporadically until April 2004.
- The TMHT version was aired in other European countries, including the Republic of Ireland (except series 1, which had the original title), The Netherlands, Belgium, Germany, Austria, Poland, Hungary, Sweden, Norway, Denmark, and Finland, in local dubs (the Finnish version was in English with subtitles, while Polish was in English with a voice-over translation). In Denmark, the English censored version was aired on the national broadcaster TV2. It had subtitles as well, however, only seasons 2 and 3 were aired in this fashion. Season 1 was aired as one spliced feature, instead of the original five-part miniseries. The movie was titled The Epic Begins, and included heavy edits from each of the five episodes, and was also released to VHS in the US in 1988.
- In Russia on the TV channel 2×2 a dubbed version in Russian was shown on September 25, 1993. On June 9, 1997, the channel shut down, and the show was discontinued. After it resumed broadcasting in 2003, a re-run with an old dubbed version began on the 2×2 from April 1, 2013. Since February 11, 2021, there is a new dubbed version on TV channel 2x2.
- In Sweden, TV 3 Sweden, which aired from London, aired seasons 1-3 between 1990 and 1993, while TV1000 aired seasons 4–6 with subtitles and the "Vacation in Europe" episodes dubbed. The series was dubbed into Swedish by Mediadubb. Sun Studio also dubbed some chosen seasons 1-3 episodes into Swedish, for home video releases in 1991, later rereleased to DVD. In Sweden, the home video releases kept the original title, "Teenage Mutant Ninja Turtles".

== Home video releases ==
=== VHS ===
The series has seen numerous releases on VHS in Region 1 by Family Home Entertainment, beginning in 1988 and continuing through 1996. Several tapes were released as part of marketing promotions with corporations such as Burger King and TV Teddy.

UK VHS tapes were initially released using the censored Teenage Mutant Hero Turtles title. They were all released by Abbey Home Media's Tempo Video label in the early-mid 90's.

==== Feature films ====
There were two feature films released only on VHS. The first was, The Epic Begins, which was built with the first four episodes which were: "Turtle Tracks", "Enter the Shredder", "Hot Rodding Teenagers from Dimension X", and "Shredder & Splintered". The second was, The Incredible Shrinking Turtles, which was built using four episodes: The Incredible Shrinking Turtles, It Came from Beneath the Sewers, The Mean Machines, and Curse of the Evil Eye.

=== LaserDisc ===
Six LaserDisc collections of selected episodes were released in North America in 1989. Releases continued through at least until 1996.

=== DVD ===
Starting in April 2004, DVD releases began in Region 1. The series has since seen numerous releases as part of DVD compilations.

==== Region 1 ====
Lionsgate Home Entertainment (through FHE Kids Entertainment and Family Home Entertainment) has released the entire series to DVD in Region 1. Initially it was released in volumes, with each volume containing 9–13 episodes in its original production order, with the exception of the first volume, which included bonus episodes from the last season. After six volumes, it was announced that the series would now be released in season sets, starting with Season 4. However, the episodes "Once Upon a Time Machine" was omitted in the Season 4 set and the 1991 prime-time special "Planet of the Turtleoids" was omitted from the Season 5 set, but are included in the Season 10 set as bonus episodes. The DVDs do not include the Turtle Tips PSAs.

On November 13, 2012, Lionsgate Family Entertainment released Teenage Mutant Ninja Turtles – The Complete Classic Series Collection on DVD in Region 1. The 23-disc set features all 193 episodes of the series as well as bonus features. It also contains special collector's edition packaging.

On July 23, 2013, Lionsgate re-released all 47 episodes of Season 3 together in a 4-disc box set.

A compilation of selected episodes, Cowabunga Classics, was released on July 29, 2014.

On October 15, 2024, Nickelodeon and Paramount Home Entertainment released the new version of the Teenage Mutant Ninja Turtles – The Complete Classic Series Collection on DVD.

==== Region 2 ====
The first volume of the 25th Anniversary Edition, containing all episodes from the first two seasons in a PAL format as well as some bonus material from Season 10, was released for Region 2 DVDs by Lionsgate Home Entertainment in the UK and the Republic of Ireland on May 25, 2009. 4 DVDs containing 3 episodes each based around Leonardo, Donatello, Raphael and Michelangelo were released on May 19, 2014. DVDs of the series were also released by German distributor KSM GmbH between May 2007 and February 2012.

==== Region 4 ====
The show was released in Australia by Lionsgate Home Entertainment between 2009 and 2016. All episodes from the 1987 series were released in sixteen volumes. The discs are in Region 4, but unusually, they are in NTSC picture format, instead of PAL. The first six DVDs are more or less duplicated from the Region 1 discs released in America, however unlike the American release, Season 4 was broken down into several separate volumes (7 to 9).

=== Video on demand ===
==== United States ====
Lionsgate Home Entertainment has also released each of the seasons in digital format which are sold separately on several digital platforms such as Amazon and iTunes in Standard Definition only. While "Once Upon a Time Machine" is included with Season 5, "Planet of the Turtleoids" is included with Season 6.

Following Nickelodeon's acquisition of the distribution rights for the series, the series had been slowly re-released under Nickelodeon's branding, also in Standard Definition only which was completed in February 2024. Excluding Vudu, the new digital releases has some slight changes over the old ones, to where "The Turtles and The Hare" is also placed alongside "Once Upon a Time Machine" in Season 5, and "Planet of the Turtloids is also restored to that aforementioned season as well in its two-part format instead of a single episode. As of April 2024, iTunes released a complete series set with all 193 episodes.

The first two seasons were made available for streaming September 19, 2023, on Paramount+. with more being added slowly with Season 3 now available. All 10 seasons were added to Tubi in June 2025.

The first season was officially released for free to watch on YouTube, on July 30, 2023. Some episodes from Season 2 were also released, as well as a live broadcast feed of the entire series.

== Reception ==
IGN named TMNT as the 55th best show in the Top 100 Best Animated TV Shows. While the story diverged heavily from the original conception of the Teenage Mutant Ninja Turtles with the universe of the original Mirage comics, the 1987 television series is largely the most notable and popular incarnation and drove the franchise to the phenomenal status it would achieve in popular culture. Co-creator, Peter Laird, has publicly shared his distaste with the show on numerous occasions but has also acknowledged that it was extremely successful with and beloved by its audience and, while he would have preferred a different approach to the material, it might not have been as popular as what was produced. Retroactively, the cross-over film Turtles Forever established a common multiverse continuity between all Teenage Mutant Ninja Turtles variations. (Except the 2012 series, as this would not be released until 3 years later.)

At the time, the series was criticized by various groups for its violent content and commercialism. The extensive line of toys and other licensed products also attracted criticism. The Australian Council for Children's Films and Television accused the show of being a 30-minute toy commercial.
