= Toxic Crusaders =

1991 animated series on Syndication

- Genre: Superhero
- Created by: Lloyd Kaufman; Michael Herz
- Based on: The Toxic Avenger by Lloyd Kaufman
- Developed by: Chuck Lorre
- Directed by: Bill Hutton; Tony Love
- Starring: Gregg Berger; Susan Blu; Rodger Bumpass; Paul Eiding; Ed Gilbert; John Mariano; Chuck McCann; Michael J. Pollard; Hal Rayle; Susan Silo; Kath Soucie; Patric Zimmerman
- Composers: Dennis C. Brown; Chuck Lorre; Larry Brown
- Country of origin: United States
- No. of seasons: 1
- No. of episodes: 13

Production
- Executive producer: Fred Wolf
- Producer: Walt Kubiak
- Running time: 25 minutes
- Production companies: Murakami-Wolf-Swenson; Sachs Family Entertainment; Troma Entertainment

Original release
- Network: First-run syndication
- Release: January 21 – May 20, 1991

Toxic Crusaders is an American animated series loosely based on The Toxic Avenger films. It features Toxie, the lead character of the films, leading a group of misfit superheroes who combat pollution. This followed a trend of environmentally considerate animated series and comics of the time, including Captain Planet and the Planeteers, Swamp Thing, and Teenage Mutant Ninja Turtles Adventures, as well as animated series based on R-rated properties like RoboCop and Police Academy. As this incarnation was aimed at children, Toxic Crusaders is considerably tamer than the films it was based on, although it contained adult-oriented jokes that would go over most children's heads.

Thirteen episodes were produced and aired, with some episodes airing as a "trial run" in Summer 1990 followed by the official debut on January 21, 1991.

The show aired in Canada on YTV from 1991 to 1992. The US cable network G4 aired the first two episodes on July 25, 2009.

== Overview ==
Prior to Toxic Crusaders, cartoons based on R-rated films had been attempted with programs such as Rambo: The Force of Freedom. However, the content of the Toxic Avenger films was arguably more controversial, featuring strong sexual content and intense violence. Created by New York-based Troma, Inc., a company famous for low-budget films such as Chopper Chicks in Zombietown, Class of Nuke 'Em High, and Sgt. Kabukiman, NYPD, the series was significantly different from its live-action source material.

The Toxic Avenger film series starred Melvin Junko, a scrawny nerd who, after being exposed to toxic waste, was mutated into a "hideously deformed creature of superhuman size and strength." In the films, "Toxie" took his revenge on industrial America by means of gory violence and bloodbaths. True to Troma's reputation, other R-rated material abounded as well.

Only thirteen syndicated episodes were produced, but like the feature films, the show became a cult favorite, spawning a string of merchandise.

== Plot ==
Like the source material, Toxie is a grotesque mutant endowed with superhuman powers, but is still a good-hearted and law-abiding citizen of the fictional town of Tromaville, New Jersey; the setting of most of Troma Entertainment's films. In a change from the films, the toxic waste mutated his mop into a sentient being that sometimes battles enemies by itself or gives him ideas on how to solve problems. The villains include Czar Zosta, Dr. Killemoff, and Psycho, polluters from the planet Smogula who wreak ecological havoc with help from Tromaville's corrupt mayor, Grody. Bonehead, a street punk who bullied Melvin, joins them in the first episode.

Dr. Killemoff and Czar Zosta are cockroach-like extraterrestrials from the planet Smogula, a world where pollution is natural as fresh air and water is to Earth. Natives of Smogula thrive on pollution and need it to survive. For unexplained reasons, Czar Zosta and other Smogulans are able to withstand Earth's atmosphere without problems, while Dr. Killemoff wears a breathing apparatus to survive. Dr. Killemoff, like most villains, has a seemingly endless army of foot soldiers called Radiation Rangers.

Other villains and heroes appeared, with most being one-off characters.

== Characters ==
=== Toxic Crusaders ===
- Toxie (voiced by Rodger Bumpass) – The main protagonist of the series. He was originally named Melvin Junko and was a meek and quirky janitor who worked at a health club, who was often toyed with by Bimbette and her friends. When they played a trick on Melvin, which involved him wearing a tutu, he ran in embarrassment and ended up stumbling into a drum filled with toxic waste. Instead of killing him, however, the toxic waste transformed him into a grotesque green-skinned mutant with athletic attributes. Melvin would change his name to Toxie and become the leader of the Crusaders. His weapon of choice is a superpowered mop named Mop, which gained sentience after being exposed to the toxic chemicals.
- Nozone (voiced by Paul Eiding) – He was originally a test pilot who, after flying through a hole in the ozone layer and crashing into a silo of radioactive pepper, gained the appearance of a blue-skinned humanoid with a wheel for a right foot. He has the power to emit powerful sneezes from his enormous nose.
- Major Disaster (voiced by Ed Gilbert) – He was originally a military soldier who gained the ability to control plants after falling into a radioactive swamp.
- Headbanger – A fusion of two opposing personalities into a two-headed body made up of Dr. Bender (voiced by Hal Rayle), the cantankerous mad scientist for the right half, and Fender (voiced by John Mariano), the surfer-like singing telegram boy, for the left half. The Fender part was responsible for the accident that caused them to fall into the atom-smasher and merge into one body. Bender mutated into a green creature akin to Toxie, but Fender retained his human appearance. Headbanger originally worked with Dr. Killemoff in a plot to put chemicals in the food at a fast food restaurant, but defected to Toxie's side after seeing girls preferred the Toxic Crusaders.
- Junkyard (voiced by Gregg Berger) – Junkyard is a humanoid dog who was formed from a junkyard dog and a homeless man. When they took shelter in Junkyard's kennel, which was covered in toxic waste, lightning struck it and merged them into one being. He joined the Toxic Crusaders after helping them fight Dr. Killemoff's forces when he disguised Island City as a resort.

=== Villains ===
- Czar Zoster (voiced by Patric Zimmerman) – One of the primary villains of the series and the ruler of Smogula. He is a small bug-like Smogulan and Dr. Killemoff's boss.
- Dr. Killemoff (voiced by Rodger Bumpass) – One of the primary villains of the series, who comes from the planet Smogula. He wears a breathing apparatus resembling a mask to survive on non-polluted worlds. Two recurring gags involving Killemoff are that he always corrects someone when they refer to him as Killemoff by shouting, "That's DR. Killemoff" and that he never listens to Psycho's predictions despite the fact they could help him succeed.
- Psycho (voiced by Michael J. Pollard) – A sardonic, obese, bio-mechanical humanoid. The reoccurring gag in each episode he appears in involves his ability to poke holes in the logic of Dr. Killemoff's plans and accurately predicting how they will fail. Despite his superior intelligence, he shows no desire or ambition to supersede Dr. Killemoff, preferring to keep his role as a henchman.
- Bonehead (voiced by Hal Rayle) – A bullying punk who was among those who laughed at Melvin's tutu incident. He later attempts to fight Toxie, who confronts him and his buddies for trying to take Yvonne's accordion. In self-defense, Toxie throws him into a barrel of acid rain, resulting in his near-skeletal appearance. Bonehead then joins forces with Dr. Killemoff and is put in command of the Radiation Rangers. He is based on Bozo from the first movie.
- Mayor Max Grody (voiced by Chuck McCann) – The corrupt mayor of Tromaville, who is allied with the Smogulans. He is based on Mayor Peter Belgoody from the first movie.
  - Mona (voiced by Susan Blu) – Mayor Grody's secretary.
- Polluto – A living oil slick monster created by Dr. Killemoff. Toxie manages to destroy Polluto in "The Maxing of Toxie" by having No-Zone sneeze a pile of cat litter on Polluto, causing it to explode. In "Club Fred," Polluto is recreated and unleashed on the Toxic Crusaders. The Toxic Crusaders throw large antacid pills on Polluto, causing it to dissolve.
- General GarBage – A Smogulan general who appears in "Invasion of the Biddy Snatchers.", where he is called in by Czar Zostas to replace Dr. Killemoff. His plot involves having his infiltrators taking over the elderly citizens of Tromaville by biting them and becoming a four-armed clone of the elderly citizens; among the victims are Mrs. Junko and Mayor Grody's mother. When Dr. Killemoff is surprised that General GarBage's plan is working, he states to Psycho and Bonehead that they will be out of a job, resulting in Dr. Killemoff calling the Toxic Crusaders for help. With help from Toxie's mother and the other elderly citizens, the Toxic Crusaders defeat the clones, with the elderly citizens using their hair spray to regress the clones back to normal form. General GarBage then appears and unleashes the Radiation Rangers on the Toxic Crusaders. At the suggestion of his mop, Toxie uses the hair spray to shrink General GarBage, causing him to retreat to Smogula.
- Radiation Rangers – Hunched-over mutants who wear yellow hazmat suits and gas masks and serve as Dr. Killemoff's foot soldiers.

=== Other characters ===
- Blobbie – Toxie's pet, which resembles a blob of goo. Toxie met Blobbie when he first arrived in the toxic waste dump
- Yvonne (voiced by Kath Soucie in a Bronx accent) – Toxie's girlfriend. She often plays the accordion and sings soprano in a pitch high enough to break things, but Toxie is too polite to criticize her about it. One time, the show broke the fourth wall, as Yvonne's singing causes the viewer's TV to break in the form of animated broken glass. Toxie apologizes to the viewer and tells them the Toxic Crusaders will buy them new TV sets. She is based on Toxie's girlfriend Claire from Toxic Avenger part 2 and 3 as played by Phoebe Legere.
- Mrs. Junko (voiced by Susan Silo in a Brooklyn accent) – Toxie's mother.
- Lloyd – A friend of the Toxic Crusaders. A recurring gag is that his wife and children have a full beard like him.
- Snailman – A man who was originally a race car driver. After careening off a bridge into a barge full of snails, the engine oil merged him with a snail. He once helped the Toxic Crusaders fight Dr. Killemoff and Czar Zoster.
- Mower Man – A man who was originally a gardener. After taking a nap in a garden shed that contained leaking gardening chemicals, which exploded in the heat, he became a half-man, half gardening equipment hybrid. He describes himself as "A hideously deformed creature of superhuman shears and strength." He works with Dr. Killemoff in a plot involving Weed Monsters, but after being fired for accidentally mowing the Weed Monsters, he is last seen applying for a job in the want ads to help Mayor Grody destroy incriminating evidence.

== Episodes ==
No.	Title	Written by	Original release date
1	"The Making of Toxie"	Chuck Lorre	January 21, 1991
Toxie becomes a superhero to fight the forces of Dr. Killemoff. He is soon joined by two more freaks named No-Zone and Major Disaster.
2	"This Spud's for You"	Story by : Ned Candle; Teleplay by : D. J. MacHale	March 8, 1991
Dr. Killemoff plots to place his chemicals in the food of a local fast food restaurant that No-Zone starts to work for. At the same time, Dr. Killemoff's mad scientist Dr. Bender is accidentally merged with a telegram boy named Fender which transforms them into Headbanger.
3	"Club Fred"	Jack Mendelsohn	March 15, 1991
To prepare for the arrival of aliens from Smogula, Dr. Killemoff has his Radiation Rangers clear out every elderly person out of their retirement homes in order to make room for their landing. The Toxic Crusaders find out about this plot and thwart it. Afterwards, Dr. Killemoff has City Island disguised as a resort to dispose of the Toxic Crusaders as they are joined in their latest battle by a humanoid dog named Junkyard.
4	"Tree Trouble"	Story by : Ned Candle; Teleplay by : D.J. MacHale	March 22, 1991
Dr. Killemoff plots to distribute "Smog in a Can." Meanwhile, Major Disaster falls in love with a tree surgeon named Emma Oakley, but loses his confidence both as a member of the team and a suitor for Emma when his powers fail.
5	"Pollution Solution"	Jack Mendelsohn	March 29, 1991
Dr. Killemoff sends his Radiation Rangers to infiltrate the Tromaville Toxic Dump in order to prepare for a Smogulan Invasion that is headed by his superior Czar Zosta.
6	"A Sight for Sore Eyes"	Jack Mendelsohn; Carole Mendelsohn	April 6, 1991
Czar Zoster discovers a surplus of smog over the Tromaville Toxic Dump. When Dr. Killemoff's attempts to get the Toxic Crusaders out of the Tromaville Toxic Dump fails, Mayor Grody ends up moving them into his penthouse.
7	"Mr. Earth: Superhero"	Walt Kubiak	April 13, 1991
Dr. Killemoff makes plans to destroy the Tromaville Shopping Mall in order to sell remote-activated Smog Inducers to the people of Tromaville. A new superhero called Mr. Earth tries to help the Toxic Crusaders, but causes more harm than help.
8	"Toxie Ties the Knot"	Jack Mendelsohn; Carole Mendelsohn	April 20, 1991
Czar Zoster's daughter, Princess Gerpa of Smogula, arrives in Tromaville, where she ends up falling in love with Toxie. Dr. Killemoff ends up playing the matchmaker for them.
9	"Invasion of the Biddy Snatchers"	Jack Mendelsohn; Carole Mendelsohn	April 27, 1991
Czar Zoster has gotten tired of Dr. Killemoff's repeated failures that he ends up replacing him with General GarBage. General GarBage plans to replace the elderly citizens of Tromaville with evil clones.
10	"The Snail Must Go Through"	Lloyd Kaufman; Michael Herz; Andrew Wolk	May 6, 1991
The Toxic Crusaders prepare for Yvonne's concert as Dr. Killemoff and Czar Zosta prepare to pollute Tromaville. The Toxic Crusaders gain help from a new mutant called Snail Man.
11	"Nab That Toxie Cab"	Jack Mendelsohn	May 6, 1991
The Toxic Crusaders start a cab company where Toxie falls in love with his cab enough to make Yvonne jealous. Meanwhile, Dr. Killemoff and Mayor Grody plot to get rid of the Toxic Crusaders with a monster truck.
12	"Still Crazy After All These Shears"	Lloyd Kaufman; Michael Herz; Jeffrey W. Sass	May 13, 1991
Mayor Grody's "Just Say Grow" campaign is actually a cover-up for Dr. Killemoff's latest plans to pollute Tromaville. Alien seeds sprout into a Weed Monster and the Toxic Crusaders fight it alongside a new mutant named Mower Man.
13	"That's No Villain, That's My Mom!"	Jack Mendelsohn; Carole Mendelsohn	May 20, 1991
Czar Zoster attempts to invade Tromaville by hot air balloon filled with toxic fumes. To keep the Toxic Crusaders busy, Dr. Killemoff organizes a convention for hideously deformed creatures of superhuman size and strength. Meanwhile, Mrs. Junko ends up working as Dr. Killemoff's "Girl Friday" when Mayor Grody raises the rent of her house, but a mishap causes Toxie's mom to switch minds with Dr. Killemoff.

== Crew ==
- Cindy Akers – assistant dialogue director
- Susan Blu – dialogue director
- Jack Mendelsohn – story editor
- Francis Moss – assistant story editor

== Other media ==
Marvel Comics released an eight-issue comic book series. It had no regular writer. Each issue was written by such notables as Steve Gerber (issues #3 and #5), Ann Nocenti (issue #7), David Leach and Jeremy Banx (lead strip script and artwork) and David Michelinie (back up strip) (issue #8), Hilary Barta (issue #2), and Simon Furman (issues #1, 4, and 6). A four book mini series was written and drawn by David Leach & Jeremy Banx. The series was solicited and the first issue written and drawn before being canceled along with all of Marvel TV tie-in titles. One issue was a direct parody of Captain Planet and the Planeteers. Issue #8 was the only mainstream US comic book ever published to carry an 'Approved by the Comic Code Authority' stamp while at the same time featuring a man sat on a toilet defecating.

In the UK, Fleetway published their own Toxic Crusaders comic book which would last for ten issues.

Playmates Toys, the same company responsible for Ninja Turtles action figures, released a line of similarly styled Toxic Crusader figures in 1991. The majority of characters featured bright neon colors and glow-in-the-dark accessories. TV commercials for the figures used the tag line "They're gross, but they still get girls!" A total of nine characters as well as some rather unorthodox vehicles saw toy shelves. Similar to the Ninja Turtles' Retromutagen Ooze, Playmates also marketed a canister of slime labeled Toxie's Toxic Waste. The toy line was principally conceived by Aaronian and the design team at Troma and Pangea Corporation. Some of the toys came packed with "Toxic Tips," which instructed kids how to make messes in their homes and otherwise muck up the environment. Similarly to the development of The Teenage Mutant Ninja Turtles, Pangea Corporation provided much of the original design, packaging, and logo development. Additionally, John Schulte and John Besmehn, worked in tandem on story premises with veteran writer and show runner, Jack Mendelsohn, and scriptwriter, Chuck Lorre.

Other tie-in products included coloring books, junior novels, Halloween costumes, Colorforms, Topps trading cards, a board game, a card game, and puzzles.

=== Video games ===
Video games of the same name were also produced by Bandai and Sega, which were released on the Nintendo Entertainment System, Game Boy, and Sega Genesis. A Super NES version was planned by Bandai around at the same time with the NES and Game Boy versions but it was cancelled for unknown reasons. A new beat-em-up game based on the series, developed and published by Retroware, is planned for release on December 4, 2025, for Nintendo Switch, PlayStation 4, PlayStation 5, Windows, Xbox One, and Xbox Series X/S.

=== Home video ===
Several years later, Troma released two Toxic Crusaders DVDs. The first was Toxic Crusaders: The Movie which consisted of the first three episodes of the series spliced together to form one story. The second release, Toxic Crusaders: Volume 1, is a collection of the first four episodes. A box set, featuring all 13 episodes and all four Toxic Avenger movies, was released on April 29, 2008. A Blu-ray was released on December 10, 2024, Toxic Crusaders: The Series, including a new introduction featuring a live-action Toxie and Dr. Killemoff, played by James T. Mills and Matthew D’Angelo.

=== Film ===
Troma was in talks to make a live action version of Toxic Crusaders at New Line Cinema. In Lloyd Kaufman's first book, All I Need to Know About Filmmaking I Learned from The Toxic Avenger, he claims that New Line did not live up to their end of the contract and the film was not made. Kaufman has speculated that New Line bought the rights because they were in negotiations to make the sequels to the Teenage Mutant Ninja Turtles movie and wanted to use the Toxic Crusaders movie as leverage against the owners of the rights to Teenage Mutant Ninja Turtles. Troma sued New Line Cinema and was awarded an undisclosed amount in damages.

== See also ==
- The Toxic Avenger (1984 film)
