= John C. Schulte =

American novelist

- Born: John Christopher Schulte; 1959 (age 66–67); Dayton, Ohio, U.S.
- Education: University of Oklahoma
- Occupations: Writer; director
- Parent(s): Ralph W. Schulte Jr. Pauline Schulte

John Christopher Schulte (born 1959) is an American writer, director, and producer of animation, toys and entertainment properties. He has developed many intellectual properties from the 1980s, 1990s and on into the 21st-century. Working as a developer and writer, he served on the development team for the Teenage Mutant Ninja Turtles, which became a multibillion-dollar franchise internationally and has had several resurgences since its original inception by the comic book duo, Kevin Eastman and Peter Laird. He provided development for licensee, Playmates Toys, and contributed stories to the animated series by Jack Mendelsohn.

He developed the toy and animation property, B.C. Bikers, about a rogue band of "chrome age" dinosaurs who ride motorcycles through their prehistoric end times. He worked on interpolating the Troma feature film, The Toxic Avenger into an animated program for kids, called Toxic Crusaders. In 2006, he worked with creator/producer, Rick Ungar, to develop Zorro: Generation Z. He penned a script for an introductory animated series called Gormiti: The Invincible Lords of Nature, based on the Italian toy from Giochi Preziosi, which made its way to the United States via Playmates Toys, and debuted on Cartoon Network in 2009.

Creating story content for digital products has resulted in Schulte's co-development of smart toys for Bandai America (Tamagotchi) and Playmates Toys (Nano).

Schulte collaborates with his longtime writing partners, John C. Besmehn, Fred Fox Jr., and his wife, Cheryl Ann Wong. Their business is Pangea Corporation where he serves as co-founder and president.

== Biography ==
=== Early years ===
John Schulte was born in 1959 in Dayton, Ohio. His father, Ralph W. Schulte Jr. (b. 1928) was a former Marine, Libertarian candidate, and entrepreneur; his mother Pauline (1929–2007) was an executive secretary and homemaker, and his grandmother Alice Barnett (1907–1977) was a composer and pianist for silent films. Schulte's brother, Lee (b. 1951), is a German scholar, teacher, composer, and writer. His sister, Betty (born 1955), was a pharmaceutical technician. Schulte married Cheryl Ann Wong (b. 1960) in 1989 and they have one daughter, Blythe Abigail Su-Ren Schulte (born 1997), an actress, singer, conductress, and innovator, who has performed with Carol Channing and is a graduate of Musical Theatre University and a Professional Music graduate of the Berklee College of Music. Blythe also appeared as a finalist in several episodes of ABC's The Toy Box, placing her toy concept with Mattel.

=== Education ===
Schulte moved from Ohio to Oklahoma City, whereupon he attended the University of Oklahoma in Norman, Oklahoma. He studied film and writing. In 1985, Schulte won a CAN Festival Award for a video documentary he produced with Hollywood sound supervisor, Tim Boggs. He was the editor-in-chief of Imbroglios, a literary magazine for the University of Oklahoma. Following university, he moved and settled in Southern California, attending the Lee Strasberg Theatre and Film Institute and the Hollywood Scriptwriting Institute. He wrote dialogue for Days of Our Lives and got his start writing for the toy and animation industry thanks to actor, screenwriter, Elliott Apstein.

=== Career ===
Schulte worked as a camera operator and video tech for sundry American Film Institute (AFI) projects, including a film by Kathryn Nesmith. Schulte then focused on writing and producing videos with actor and soap opera writer, Elliott Apstein for clients such as Tomy Toys. Following Schulte's work on Kathryn Nesmith's AFI project, An All Consuming Passion, he co-wrote and produced a television pilot for Garry Marshall, called Four Stars. Schulte went on to develop and write episodes for the mixed live action and animated kids show, Gina D, for Sullivan Entertainment. He worked on entertainment projects with producer Claudia Mokarow, manager of world chess champion, Bobby Fischer. He retains the rights to the Bobby Fischer book, I Was Tortured in the Pasadena Jailhouse, and collaborated with Miloš Forman and Peter Falk on the entertainment project.

He co-produced a teenage novel trilogy with his brother, Lee, called Time Capsule Murders. The first book of the series, Why Begins With W, was published in late 2009 under the pseudonyms Hamish De'Lamet and Chandral Ramon, by Potocki Press, an imprint of WingSpan. Schulte also completed work editing a self-help martial arts book, The 7 C's of Success, written by actor/director/martial artist, Shaunt Benjamin and a new book, Diary of a Little Devil, by Edgar Award-winning author, Barbara Brooks Wallace. He also edits and agents the oeuvre of Barbara Brooks Wallace. One of his original intellectual properties, The Brotherhood, was included in Miriam Van Scott's The Encyclopedia of Hell. He is a member of The Academy of American Poets and The Authors Guild.

Schulte collaborated with songwriter, singer and record producer Ron Dante on a new musical, which had a reading in 2010; and he is writing with Barbara Brooks Wallace a television show based on her Miss Switch book series. In early 2011 he wrote, designed and developed two new series based on secondary characters from the anime series, Speed Racer. He has developed a YA novel series with Besmehn and Fox based on Zorro. The first book in the series is titled, Zorro: Resurrection. In 2014, in collaboration with author, Judith Furedi, Schulte edited, contributed, and released an homage to legendary musician/composer/performer, John Lennon, entitled, A Lennon Pastiche. A collection of Schulte's poetry, Blue Muse Rising, was published in 2016 in concert with National Poetry Month.

In 2019, Schulte was featured on Netflix's series, The Toys That Made Us, along with his writing and business partner, John Besmehn, on the segment discussing their writing involvement with the Teenage Mutant Ninja Turtles.
