= MacGovern =

MacGovern is a surname. Notable people with the surname include:

- John MacGovern (born 1951), American politician
- Stan MacGovern (1903–1975), American cartoonist

== See also ==
- McGovern
