= Teenage Mutant Ninja Turtles action figures =

Action figures based on the Teenage Mutant Ninja Turtles

- Storage Shell Donatello action figure produced by Playmates Toys in 1990.
- Type: Action figures
- Company: Playmates Toys
- Country: British Hong Kong (1988–1 July 1997); Hong Kong (1 July 1997–)
- Availability: 1988–Present
- Materials: plastic

Action figures based on the Teenage Mutant Ninja Turtles franchise have been produced by Playmates Toys since 1988. Staff artists at the Northampton, Massachusetts based Mirage Studios have provided conceptual designs for many of the figures, vehicles, and playsets and are credited on the packaging of the products they created.

Between 1988 and 1997, Playmates produced around 400 figures and dozens of vehicles and playsets. About US$1.1 billion of Turtles toys were sold in four years, making them the third-bestselling toy figures ever at the time, behind G.I. Joe and Star Wars. Influenced by the success of He-Man, G.I. Joe and Transformers, which had promoted toy lines with animated series, Playmates worked with Murakami-Wolf-Swenson to produce the first Turtles animated series, which premiered in 1987 and ran for almost a decade.

== Getting started ==
The first TMNT license came in the form of a role-playing game by Palladium, followed by miniatures from Dark Horse. Within a year, First Comics began to reprint the early issues in color volumes; four were produced, stopping at issue 11. These sold well, and Eastman and Laird were soon contacted by Mark Freedman, a licensing agent who believed he could make something of the Turtles. Freedman took the idea to a variety of toy companies, only to be turned down by those who felt the concept was not popular enough to support a toy line. Only one company expressed interest, a little-known California company by the name of Playmates Toys. Not entirely willing to risk marketing a small cult comic book, Playmates insisted that a cartoon series be produced first. Development initiated with a creative team of companies and individuals: Jerry Sachs, famous ad man of Sachs-Finley Agency, brought together the animators at Murakami-Wolf-Swenson, headed by award-winning animator Fred Wolf. Wolf and his team combined concepts and ideas with Playmates marketing crew, headed by Karl Aaronian and then VP of Sales, Richard Sallis and President of Playmates, Bill Carlson. Aaronian brought on several designers and concepteer and writer John Schulte and worked out the simple backstory that would live on toy packaging for the entire run of the product and show. Sachs called the high-concept pitch "Green Against Brick". The sense of humor was honed with the collaboration of MWS's writers, Walt Kubiak, Aaronian, Schulte and Sachs. Playmates and their team essentially served as associate producers and contributing writers to the miniseries that was first launched to sell-in the toy action figures. Phrases like "Heroes in a Half Shell" and many of the comical catch phrases and battle slogans ("Turtle Power!") came from the writing and conceptualization of this creative team. As the series developed, veteran writer Jack Mendelsohn came on board as both a story editor and scriptwriter. David Wise, Michael Charles Hill and Michael Reaves wrote most of the scripts, taking input via Mendelsohn and collaborating writer Schulte and marketing maven Aaronian. In signing with Murakami-Wolf-Swenson Productions, Eastman and Laird saw the production of the first TMNT cartoon in December 1987. Playmates held up their end of the deal and produced the first series of TMNT action figures in the summer of 1988. The premiere series included the four Turtles, Splinter, April, Shredder, Rocksteady, Bebop, and a Foot Soldier. Vehicles included the Cheapskate, Turtle Trooper, Turtle Blimp, and Foot Knucklehead. Each vehicle set was packaged with a jokebook and a small catalog. If one was to clip the "Pizza Point"s located on the reverse side of the packaging then a person could redeem them along with a small fee for other Turtles merchandise like VHS tapes, posters, bath towels, among others. Corresponding firmly with its animated series counterpart, the original TMNT action figure line would last ten years and develop a legacy within the toy realm.

== Overview ==
The first three series of figures took obvious influence from the original Mirage comics: the Turtles lacked pupils and had bulging muscles with large veins, their bodies were shorter, more stocky and their beaks longer and more pointy like in the comics. The blister card art was also very unrefined and reflected the comics; in fact, Shredder's pose was based directly on art from the debut issue. Each figure had at least seven points of articulation (neck, shoulders, wrists, hips), many accessories including each character's signature weapon, and a bio card on the back of the blister package that kids could cut out and collect. Also included was a fully illustrated origin story on the card's backside which was phased out during the fourth series. The figures boasted highly detailed sculpting, especially for the time. Colorful characters like General Traag, Rat King, Mutagen Man, Scumbug, Pizza Face, Muckman, and many others featured intricate details such as small animals crawling over them, large scars, torn clothing, and pieces of garbage stuck to their bodies.

With the release of the second series in 1989, fans saw ten entirely new figures: five allies and five enemies, six new vehicles/accessories, the first playset, the Turtle Battle Fun role-play sets, 9" and 13" plush dolls, and official Retromutagen Ooze. This year also marked the first time Playmates would incorporate action features into their figures along with the first Turtle variants in the "Wacky Action" sub-line. Each figure possessed a wind-up function that, when applied, caused the figure's limbs to rapidly move in a rhythmic motion.

Wacky Action was followed by several additional product lines during the 1990s, including Talkin' Turtles, Head Droppin' Turtles, Mutations, and Sewer Sports Turtles, along with numerous other variations of the action figures. These releases expanded the range of Teenage Mutant Ninja Turtles toys available during the decade.

=== Vehicles and accessories ===
Considering all of the vehicles and inventions conceived by Donatello, Playmates could not have their figures without a slew of toy gadgetry to interact with. Aside from vehicles actually seen in the cartoon, Playmates went on to create a wide variety other accessories. These often expressed the humorous side of TMNT with gadgets commonly made out of sewer lids, trash cans, plungers, and toilet seats. However, vehicles would also include a diversity of play features from the ripcord action of the Psycho Cycle to the electronic launching of the Turtle Pizza Thrower to the smoky bubble spout of the Bubble Bomber. For its time, TMNT was remarkably innovative in terms of fun action figure accessories.

In the midst of action figures filling the store shelves, role playing toys were also released. Depending on the depicted character, these typically included a ninja mask and plastic weapons. Other TMNT toys would be sold individually such as the Turtle Communicator, Raphael's Spy goggles, and Leo's Sewer Force Sword.

One of the most famous components of the TMNT realm is the radioactive slime Retromutagen Ooze, which mutated the Ninja Turtles from common house pets to "mean, green, fightin' machines." Thus, even Ooze was produced for the interaction with TMNT figures in 1989. The green slime was sold in a small container which also included a glow-in-the-dark Ninja Turtle in mid-mutation. Aside from the classic "Turtle Green," a "Purple Foot" variation would also become available in 1993. Ooze was an essential component to playsets such as the Flushomatic, and action figures like Muckman, who could have it run from his hollow head and out his mouth. Depending on their features, occasional figures and accessories came with their own smaller canister of Ooze to fulfill the playtime experience.

== Themes and incarnations ==
Throughout the 1990s, Ninja Turtle action figures would run an extensive gauntlet of different themes and incarnations. Whereas Batman may have become known for hundreds of gadget-wielding action figures, the Ninja Turtles would become synonymous with dozens of historical and pop culture related embodiments; which would be replicated by Kenner in their "Legends of Batman" line. Varying concepts and toy trends resulted in the many examples shown below.

- Basic series figures taking on various looks; Leo, the Sewer Samurai, Don, the Undercover Turtle, Mike, the Sewer Surfer, and Raph, the Space Cadet. (1990) Also released with the basic line were the four turtles with Storage Shell. Each action figure had an opening back shell which could store the various accessories each figure was packaged with. Donatello would be released in 1990 and the remaining three the following year.
- Mutant Military - Different forms of military - Lieutenant Leo, Pro Pilot Don, Midshipman Mike, and Raph, the Green Teen Beret. (1991)
- Rock'n Rollin' - Vibrant musical gimmicks; Classic Rocker Leo, Punker Don, Rappin' Mike, and Heavy metal Raph. (1991)
- Sewer Sports All-Stars - Sport-themed figures with action features; Among others, T.D. Tossin' Leo, Slam Dunkin' Don, Shell Slammin' Mike, and Grand Slammin' Raph. (1991)
- Wacky Wild West - The Ninja Turtles taking on the Old West; Chief Leo, Crazy Cowboy Don, Bandito-Bashin' Mike, and Sewer Scout Raph.(1992)
- Cave-Turtles - Stone Age "Collectible Turtle Combo" boxsets; Among others, Leo and his Dingy Dino, Don and his Trippy Tyrannosaurus, Mike and his Silly Stegosaurus, and Raph and his Tubular Pterodactyl. (1992-'93)
- Turtle Trolls - A take on the early 1990s troll doll craze; Leo, Don, Mike, and Raph featuring tall, synthetic hair and childlike appearances. (1993)
- Universal Studios Monsters - Classic monster-themed figures; Among others, Leo as the Wolfman, Don as Dracula, Mike as Frankenstein's monster, Raph as the Mummy, and Bride of Frankenstein April. (1993-'94)
- Star Trek - A crossover due to Playmates' owning both Star Trek and TMNT licenses; Captain Leonardo, First Officer (Star Trek) Don, Chief Engineer Michelangelo, and Chief Medical Officer Raphael. (1994)
- Adventurers - Figures dressed for adventuring; Deep Sea Diver Leonardo, Arctic Donatello, and Safari Michelangelo. (1995)
- Jim Lee's TMNT - Majorly restyled Ninja Turtle figures based on the designs of famous comic book artist Jim Lee. (1995)
- Mutant Masters - The Ninja Turtles sporting Anime inspired armor as "ancient mythic warriors"; Leonardo Wind Warrior, Donatello Water Warrior, Michelangelo Thunder Warrior, and Raphael Fire Warrior. (1997)

Even with the silliest of concepts, Playmates managed to create some intriguing and fun figure designs for children. In contrast to other companies like Kenner, who constantly re-released figure sculpts with different paint jobs, Playmates rarely showed a cheap or careless effort in their TMNT figures. But with rising competition, limited figure concepts, and the end of the cartoon series, a pitfall was inevitable.

=== Movie Stars and Toon Turtles ===
By the second, less violent TMNT film, Teenage Mutant Ninja Turtles II: The Secret of the Ooze, Playmates decided to create a figure collection based on the characters' live-action appearance. In contrast to the regular figures, these were made of a softer, more rubbery material to better reflect the look of the animatronic costumes used in the films. They also featured ball joints at the neck, shoulders, and hips, and each figure came with a small, canister of Ooze. In terms of character variety, however, the Movie Stars collections were in stark contrast to the wide variety seen in the basic figure lines.

1992 also saw the production of Toon Turtles. These figures took on an almost stereotypical approach to being humorously cartoon-like. Each character bore a friendly, animated appearance with a glittery paint job and including some type of "cartoon" action feature (Raphael's head spun, Michelangelo's tongue unraveled in Tex Avery fashion, etc.). On the upside, this series produced a more "cartoon accurate" painted version of Shredder and introduced toys not previously made for many longtime characters from the cartoon series such as the Neutrinos and April O'Neil's co-workers, Irma Langinstein, Burne Thompson and Vernon Fenwick.

A third movie hit theatres in 1993 but saw less success than its predecessors. This collection featured the Ninja Turtles once again in their Movie Star likeness and sporting samurai armor, as well as several other side characters. The Giant Movie III Samurai figures also came complete with removable masks and time scepters as seen in the film.

=== Mini Mutants ===
In 1994, Playmates, in an attempt capitalize on toy lines like Mighty Max and Polly Pocket, shrunk the Turtles down to an equally small size in a sub-line simply named "Mini Mutants". These were "Turtle Transport Combos" which contained one figure and two vehicles. "Bodacious Battlesets" which were four playsets which could connect via bridges/platforms; these included one figure. "Turtle Top Playsets" were a characters head which would open into a double decker playset; these included three figures. Slimmer "Carry Along Playsets" took the shape of Raph's sai, Leo's katana, and the Turtle Communicator; these came with three figures. And finally, "Turtle in a Turtle" consisted of four playsets that were figures of the four turtles about 6 inches taller than the normal figure; their heads, stomachs, and shells opened into the playsets. Each had themed removable armor as well; two figures were included with each.

=== WWE Tie In ===
Playmates also released a series of four special edition WWE themed figures. The line featured only figures of the four turtles, presented in the wrestling attire of famous WWE Wrestlers. This line included: The Undertaker (Don), John Cena (Leo), Sting (Raph), and "Macho Man" Randy Savage (Mikey).

== Unproduced toys ==
The original Ninja Turtles line ran for almost ten years and, in that time, various planned items would ultimately not hit toy shelves. Some of these went as far as the prototype stage and being presented at New York Toy Fairs; others had only designs drawn.

=== 1989 ===
- The original Casey Jones figure had an interchangeable head without a detachable mask. The sculpt looked to be based on the Mirage Comics.

=== 1991 ===
- Turtle Tenderizer 4x4
- Leo's Turtle Shell Backpack
- 13" April - drawing gives the impression she would have been in the vein of a Barbie doll
- Tokka Battle Fun Set

=== 1992 ===
- Michelangelo's Sidewalk Surfer
- Raph's Pizza-Powered Parachute - this was produced with Donatello instead
- Retromutagen Rifle
- Turtle Popcan Racer

=== 1993 ===
- Giant Movie 3 versions of Don and Mike
- "Transforming" Muta-Party Wagon. It would have transformed into a 19" Robot Turtle with a resemblance to Metalhead

=== 1994 ===
- The Star Trek Leonardo/Kirk figure was originally shown in his green shirt and had a different sculpting.
- The Star Trek Don and Mike figures originally had all unique sculpts.
- A Giant Cyber Samurai
- "Warriors of the Forgotten Sewer" "Knight Mike", "Wizard Splinter", and "Savage Leo with Sewer Warcat" two-pack
- Sewer Subway Car vehicle
- "Ninjamobiles" - Turtle Van and Foot module in an Ed “Big Daddy” Roth style
- A "Kung Fu Tournament Fighters" Leonardo

=== 1995 ===
- Team Ninja Figure assortment (the four turtles in cybernetic armor)
- Metal Mutant Rocksteady with Serpent Armor
- Metal Mutant Bebop with Fish Armor
- Metal Mutant War Horse
- Warrior Rahzar with Fur
- Jim Lee's TMNT Leonardo
- 8 Mini Mutant Vehicle Combos
- Repaints of "The Military Turtles" - Leo and Raph were from the 1991 series and Don and Mike were from the ’92 series.
- Shredder's Ooze and Raphael's Pizza Chompin' Portable Games

=== 1998 ===
- Dr. Quease
- Shadow Ninja Deluxe figures

=== Unknown Year ===
- April as Cat

=== 2023 ===
Mutant tots Ghengis Frog and Mondo Gecko

Mutant tots Wingnut and Scumbug

== Advertising ==
TMNT action figure commercials that started with the first series featured clips from the cartoon and narration describing the figures which were shown in incredible "toy size" environments. This also went for vehicles and playsets. The scenes from the show were overdubbed with dialogue usually from the actual voice actors that went along with story in the ad.

During post movie success, many commercials relied on live-action, animatronic Ninja Turtles similar to those seen in the "Coming Out of their Shells" Tour. Prime examples of these include 1992 spots for the Bubble Bomber vehicle featuring Raphael in military fatigues and Bodacious Birthday figures where a surprise party was thrown in the Turtles' sewer lair.

== 1996–1998: Dry spell ==
By 1996, the cartoon series that lasted nearly a decade had come to an end. The following year, a new live-action series premiered entitled Ninja Turtles: The Next Mutation. The series was somewhat short-lived but managed to make for an extensive action figure line. Alongside the basic TMNT characters, this collection of taller scale figures included a female Ninja Turtle named Venus. The show's demise, however, would further confirm the dissolving popularity of the Ninja Turtles, and the franchise would remain in limbo for years to come. Left with a disappointing movie four years prior and virtually no place on television, the TMNT franchise would face a halt in action figure production for several years.

== 2003–2012 ==
On February 8, 2003, Fox revived the TMNT franchise with a brand new cartoon series. With it inevitably came a series of action figures. These figures showed reminiscence of those released in 1988 yet with the refreshed design of the new, bold look of the cartoon series. Unlike the previous figures, most of the figures released in this collection actually appeared in the 2003 series. This collection successfully continued into 2006 with new character designs and even an occasional revisiting of past concepts like 1993's Cave-Turtles. In 2006, by request of Playmates, the cartoon series took a new lighter direction which brought Teenage Mutant Ninja Turtles: Fast Forward, a futuristic take on the heroic mutants. Playmates thought of this change as a means of selling more new Turtles action figures.

March 2007 introduced fans to a new CGI feature film entitled simply TMNT. This introduced the Ninja Turtles on-screen to a new generation and corresponded with an extensive action figure line. New figures based on the film continued to be produced into the following year.

In September 2007, it was announced that the collectible figure company NECA had acquired the license to produce Ninja Turtle figures based on their character likenesses from the original Mirage comic books. The first wave of figures consisted of the four Turtles and was released in comic and specialty stores in early 2008. The New York Comic Con also boasted an exclusive figure four-pack, and that same year, NECA released black & white versions of the Turtles just as they appeared in the pages of the comics.

In January 2009, to commemorate the Turtles' 25th anniversary, Playmates re-released the first series of figures c. 1988, plus Slash and the Party Wagon. Each figure comes packaged with vintage card art and a DVD containing one episode of the 1987 cartoon series. A separate series of totally new designs was also planned but not released by Playmates. These figures are based on early Mirage comics and include Splinter, Shredder, and a Foot Soldier among the four Turtles in red apparel. These turtles were first unveiled in the Nintendo Power magazine.

== 2012 Nickelodeon Teenage Mutant Ninja Turtles ==
In 2012, Playmates released a new series of the Teenage Mutant Ninja Turtles action figures with wide variety of characters of the popular Nickelodeon's new CG animated Teenage Mutant Ninja Turtles series.

2014 TMNT action figure checklist

The first wave of action figures contained characters from the new animated series. Leonardo, Raphael, Donatello, Michelangelo, Splinter, April O'Neil, Shredder, Foot Soldier and Kraang.

Wave 2 featured Metalhead, Fishface and Dogpound.

Wave 3 featured Ooze Launchin' Leo, Ooze Tossin' Raph, Ooze Scoopin' Donnie and Ooze Chunkin' Mikey, featuring backpacks which would fling Mutagen Ooze, which was sold separately.

Wave 4 featured Leatherhead, Baxter Stockman and Snakeweed.

Wave 5 featured Stealth Tech Leo, Stealth Tech Donnie, Stealth Tech Raph, Stealth Tech Mikey, the Rat King and Cockroach Terminator.

Wave 6 featured Ninjas in Training Leonardo & Donatello, and Ninjas in Training Michelangelo & Raphael, M.O.U.S.E.R.S. (6 pack), Shredder w/ removable helmet, and Spider Bytes.

Wave 7 features Battle Shell Leo, Battle Shell Donnie, Battle Shell Raph and Battle Shell Mikey.

Wave 8 featured Casey Jones, Kirby Bat, Mutagen Man and Squirrelanoid.

Wave 9 featured Dojo Splinter, Newtralizer, Rahzar and Slash.

Wave 10 featured Leo The Knight, Donnie The Wizard, Raph The Barbarian, Mikey The Elf,

Wave 11 featured Robotic Foot Soldier, Tiger Claw and the Original Comic Book Leonardo, Raphael, Michelangelo and Donatello.

Wave 12 featured Mystic Leonardo, Mystic Michelangelo, Mystic Raphael, Mystic Donatello, Bebop and Rocksteady.

Wave 13 featured Mikey Turflytle, Karai Serpent, Stockman-Fly, Head Droppin'Leonardo, Donatello, Raphael and Michelangelo.

Wave 14 featured Monkey Brains, Napoleon Bonafrog and Leonardo, Raphael, Michelangelo and Donatello as a Toon Repaint.

Wave 15 featured Savage Mikey, Mondo Gecko, Fugitoid, Mutant Shredders, Atilla the Frog, Dark Beaver, Dimension X Leonardo, Dimension X Raphael, Dimension X Michelangelo and Dimension X Donatello.

Wave 16 featured Dimension X April, Dimension X Casey Jones, Mozar, Lord Dregg, Robug, Shadow Ninja Color Change Leo, Shadow Ninja Color Change Mikey, Eye-Poppin' Leo, Tongue-Poppin' Mikey, Spittin' Raphael and Spittin' Michelangelo.

Wave 17 featured Ninja Strike Leo, Ninja Strike Donnie, Ninja Kick Mikey, Ninja Kick Raph, Tongue-Poppin' Donnie, Dire Beaver, Karai and Armaggon.

Wave 18 featured Spyline Leo, Spyline Mikey, Spyline Donnie and Spyline Raph.

Wave 19 featured Muckman, Crimson Leader, Super Shredder, Super Ninja Leo, Super Ninja Raph, Super Ninja Mikey, Super Ninja Donnie and Knockout Ninja Leo

Wave 20 / Tales of the Teenage Mutant Ninja Turtles featured Battle Shell Leonardo, Battle Shell Donatello, Battle Shell Michelangelo, Battle Shell Raphael, Sensei Splinter, Mystic April O'neil, Vigilante Casey Jones, Ragin' Leatherhead, Rookies in Training Leo and Donnie, Rookies in Training Mikey and Raph, Mighty Leo, Tech Donnie, Hothead Raph, Jokester Mikey, Lethal Robotic Foot Soldier, Savage Rahzar, Brutal Shredder, Fierce Fishface, Mastermind Baxter Fly and Toxic Mutagen Man.

Wave 21 / Samurai Series featured Samurai Leo, Samurai Mikey, Samurai Raph, Samurai Donnie, Usagi Yojimbo and Samurai Usagi

Wave 22 featured Monster Hunter Leo, Monster Hunter Raph, Mutant Mummy Leo, Vampire Raph, Frankendon, Werewolf Mikey, 80's Leo, 80's Bebop and 80's Rocksteady.

Special figures featured Goodies vs Baddies Leonardo vs. Bebop, Goodies vs Baddies Michelangelo vs. Rocksteady, Goodies vs Baddies Raphael vs. Shredder. In the UK there were released two special combat packs which featured Mikey vs. Fishface and Leo vs. Mutagen Man

In 2015, some figures in the TMNT 2012 animated series line were re-released as Mutations figures. Each figure has removable body parts that can be placed on other figures to make wacky mutations. The First line includes Leo, Donnie, Raph, Mikey, Splinter, Shredder, Slash, Metalhead, and Tiger Claw. The Second line includes Casey Jones, Bebop and Rocksteady. Whereas the Third line includes Rahzar, Dogpound and Robotic Foot Soldier.

During the series Playmates Toys canceled some figures: Undead Shredder, The Creep, Biotroid, Savanti Romero, Kraang Prime, Mutant Pets 3-Pack (Featuring Spike, Ice Cream Kitty and Dr. Cluckingsworth), Kavaxas, Jei, Parasitica Wasp and Mix and Match Mutations Stockman-Fly.

== 2014 and 2016 movies ==
A basic figure assortment wave was released for the 2014 Jonathan Liebesman Ninja Turtles movie which included Leonardo, Donatello, Raphael, Michelangelo, Splinter, April O'Neil, Shredder and Foot Soldier. Deluxe Leo, Don, Raph and Mikey were also released. The Turtle Van also came out in the 2014 series.

Action figures and other toys were also released for the 2016 movie Out of the Shadows.

== Rise of the Teenage Mutant Ninja Turtles figures and playsets ==
With the introduction of Rise of the Teenage Mutant Ninja Turtles in mid 2018, a new action figure line was produced by Playmates. At its peak, the line consisted of twelve figures, including the four heroes - Leonardo, Michelangelo, Donatello, Raphael and their allies: Bullhop, Splinter and April O'Neil. Villains in the line included Meat Sweats, an Origami Ninja, the Foot Lieutenant, Albearto and Baron Draxum, with Hypno-Potamous and the Shredder coming into the roster later on.

The line didn't live up to sales expectations, leading to many of the figures Playmates had planned being cancelled, among the casualties were allegedly figures of Splinter's alter ego Lou Jitsu and villains Baxter Stockboy, Big Mama and Repo Mantis. The Big Mama figure would later resurface on eBay UK, being sold for £70.88 at auction.

== Mutant Mayhem ==
With the introduction of Teenage Mutant Ninja Turtles: Mutant Mayhem in mid 2023, a new action figure line was introduced.

Wave one included Leonardo, Michelangelo, Donatello and Raphael

Wave two included master Splinter, Bebop, Rocksteady, Leatherhead and Superfly

Wave three included Genghis Frog, Mondo Gecko, Wingnut, April o' Neil and Scum bug

Wave four included Mutant tots Bebop and Rocksteady, Mutant tots Leonardo, Donnie, Mutant tots- Raphael and Michelangelo and Young Splinter

Wave five was Ray Fillet

There were also Walmart exclusive figures such as Mega Mutant and the party disguise pack

== Tales of the Teenage Mutant Ninja Turtles ==
To coincide with the launch of the Paramount+ animated series Tales of the Teenage Mutant Ninja Turtles, the Mutant Mayhem line was rebranded with a new cardback and 2D artwork of the Turtles from the series. Playmates has relaunched the Mutations series of figures, bringing back the Mix-n-Match series from the 2012 toy line as well as revised versions of the "mutating" turtles which have been released in several toy lines over the years.

Additionally, in conjunction with the release of Teenage Mutant Ninja Turtles: Mutants Unleashed by Outright Games, several figures early on in the Tales line were issued with special codes that unlock character skins in the game. These included Mikey and Raph in their high-school gear and newcomers Crabapult and Turbo-Cammy.
