= John Besmehn =

American film producer

John Charles Besmehn (born 1964) from San Jose, California, is a writer, director, producer of animated and live action shows, and a developer of toys and entertainment properties. He co-developed the toy line for Teenage Mutant Ninja Turtles.

He co-created the toy and animation property, B.C. Bikers, about a rogue band of "chrome age" dinosaurs who ride motorcycles through an apocalyptic past. Besmehn has also conceived, designed and written for the Toxic Crusaders, based on The Toxic Avenger. He co-wrote with his collaborator, John Schulte, the animated pilot for the series Gormiti: The Invincible Lords of Nature, which debuted on Cartoon Network in 2009 and was based on the Italian toy collectible from Giochi Preziosi.

Besmehn writes and develops toy and entertainment properties with his longtime writing partners, John C. Schulte, Fred Fox Jr., and business associate, Cheryl Ann Wong. He is a co-founder and general partner in Pangea Corporation.

== Biography ==
=== Early years ===
Besmehn was born in 1964 in San Jose, California, to Charles and Marion Besmehn. He attended San Mateo College and Glendale College, studying theatre, law and computer programming.

=== Career ===
Following college, Besmehn filmed productions and performed in short films eventually met his long-time collaborator, John C. Schulte, whilst developing a reality-based series, "The Perfect Wedding." Besmehn had acting roles in A Nightmare on Elm Street 3: Dream Warriors, Invasion: Earth, and Return to Horror High. Besmehn developed concepts for DIC Entertainment, including for Arsenio Hall's Chunky A character and New Kids on the Block.

Besmehn created toy lines and animated shows, such as Speed Racer, Zorro, Biker Mice from Mars, The Mask, Mirmo, Toonsylvania, The Mummy, andPenguins of Madagascar. He also designed the logic and content for Amazing Ally from Playmates, Tamagotchi, Nano, and the character-based robot, Brian the Brain. The interactive storytellers, Yano, Wittley and Bubba are among his credits.

As a programmer, Besmehn created websites for Bandai, SpeedRacer, and WhacAMole. Besmehn is the director and editor of the video for kids called "Yoga Divas". He has also worked with DreamWorks, Universal Studios, and Sony. Besmehn collaborates with Ron Dante on a musical; he is co-writing a show with Barbara Brooks Wallace based on her Miss Switch book series.
