= Jack Mendelsohn =

American screenwriter

- Born: November 8, 1926 Beverly Hills, California, U.S.
- Died: January 25, 2017 (aged 90) Los Angeles, California, U.S.
- Area: Writer-artist
- Notable works: Teenage Mutant Ninja Turtles (1987 TV series)

Panels from Jack Mendelsohn's 1959–61 comic strip Jackys Diary.

Jack Mendelsohn (November 8, 1926 – January 25, 2017) was an American writer-artist who worked in animation, comic strips and comic books. An Emmy-nominated television comedy writer and story editor, he had numerous credits as a TV scripter, including Rowan & Martin's Laugh-In, Three's Company, The Carol Burnett Show and Teenage Mutant Ninja Turtles. Among his work for feature films, he was a co-screenwriter of Yellow Submarine (1968). In 2004, the Animation Writers Caucus of the Writers Guild gave him a Lifetime Achievement Award.

== Personal life ==
His father was an agent for cartoonist-animator Winsor McCay, and during Mendelsohn's childhood in Brooklyn, he was an avid reader of cartoonist Stan MacGovern's off-beat New York Post comic strip, Silly Milly, an obvious influence on Mendelsohn's cartoon style. Dropping out of high school, Mendelsohn joined the Navy and after World War II, he contributed gag cartoons to The Saturday Evening Post and other magazines.

Mark Evanier reported Jack Mendelsohn died of lung cancer on the evening of January 25, 2017.

== Jackys Diary ==
In the late 1950s and early 1960s, while living in Mexico City, he wrote and drew his innovative comic strip, Jackys Diary. It began January 11, 1959, continuing until 1961. The Sunday-only strip is regarded by many comics buffs as one of King Features Syndicate's most novel and clever humor strips. In Toonopedia, Don Markstein wrote:

It purported to be the hand-illustrated, hand-written diary of a young boy, supposedly Mendelsohn himself in his extreme youth. Thus, it was both written and illustrated as though by a small child—which is not as easy to do as some who have had the misfortune of growing up might think. Week after week, Mendelsohn described trips to the circus, fishing expeditions, visits to members of his extended family, and all sorts of other adventures kids have, in a style simulating that of an actual kid—except, of course, for the fact that it was professionally rendered in every way. Unfortunately, professional work is sometimes best recognized by another professional, or at least by someone who knows what to look for—or at the very least, by someone who could see that this was a spoof, and that childishness was a schtick and not a natural state for Mendelsohn. King Features received complaints from those who didn't "get" it and thought the company was publishing the work of an actual child—or, in the case of those who noticed the byline ("by Jacky Mendelsohn, age 32 1/2") by an adult whose abilities hadn't progressed since childhood. Often, parents, mistaking the strip's intent, would encourage their own children to send in submissions to what they thought was a kids' participation feature. But that's not why it folded quickly, Mendelsohn said in a later interview. It's simply that a Sunday-only comic is more expensive to produce than a daily, and King just couldn't afford it anymore.

The strip was adapted into two Noveltoons short films by Paramount Pictures' cartoon studio in 1965, which Mendelsohn directed personally; Mendelsohn had worked at the studio in the 1950s as a cel painter, and had written numerous stories for the studio after returning.

An apostrophe was added to the strip's title when it was reprinted by Dell Comics as Jacky's Diary. Beginning June 2010, Jackys Diary was carried by King Features' DailyINK, but it was dropped from the DailyINK line-up in 2012. DailyINK's Archivist explained, "Unfortunately, we no longer have the rights to publish the strip."

The complete run of the strip was released as a hardcover book in 2014 by IDW Publishing.

Mendelsohn ghostwrote for other comic strips, and he also wrote for comic books, notably as a contributor to EC Comics' Panic. In 2014, Mendelsohn received the Bill Finger Award.

== Screenwriting credits ==
- series head writer denoted in bold

=== Television ===
- Beetle Bailey (1963)
- The Beatles (1965-1967)
- George of the Jungle (1967)
- The Abbott and Costello Cartoon Show (1967)
- Rowan & Martin's Laugh-In (1968-1969)
- The Jim Nabors Hour (1969-1970)
- Sabrina the Teenage Witch (1969-1972)
- Will the Real Jerry Lewis Please Sit Down (1970)
- Groovie Goolies (1970)
- The Carol Burnett Show (1970-1971)
- The Funky Phantom (1971)
- The Roman Holidays (1972)
- The Flintstone Comedy Hour (1972)
- The Addams Family (1973)
- Speed Buggy (1973)
- The New Scooby-Doo Movies (1973)
- Yogi's Gang (1973)
- Hong Kong Phooey (1974)
- Partridge Family 2200 A.D. (1974)
- Shazam! (1974)
- The Great Grape Ape Show (1975)
- Chico and the Man (1975-1976)
- Doc (1976)
- Wonderbug (1976-1977)
- Carter Country (1977)
- The Skatebirds (1977)
- Wonder Wheels (1977-1978)
- Three's Company (1978-1979)
- Hello, Larry (1979-1980)
- The Flintstone Comedy Show (1980)
- Richie Rich (1981)
- The Love Boat (1982)
- Meatballs & Spaghetti (1982)
- Spider-Man and His Amazing Friends (1983)
- Paw Paws (1986)
- Dennis the Menace (1986)
- Beverly Hills Teens (1987)
- **Teenage Mutant Ninja Turtles** (1987-1993): season 1-7 head writer
- Camp Candy (1989-1990)
- Barnyard Commandos (1990)
- **Toxic Crusaders** (1991)
- **James Bond Jr.** (1991-1992)
- Taz-Mania (1993)
- The New Adventures of Zorro (1997)
- The Fantastic Voyages of Sinbad the Sailor (1998)
- Ultimate Book of Spells (2001)
- Clifford the Big Red Dog (2002)
- Gadget & the Gadgetinis (2003)

=== Film ===
- Yellow Submarine (1968)
- The Adventures of Robin Hoodnik (1972)
- Gallavants (1984)
- Sweet Sea (1985)

== Sources ==
- Province, John. "Jack of All Trades," interview in Hogan's Alley #10 (pages 76–84), Summer 2002.
