= Teenage Mutant Ninja Turtles =

American media franchise

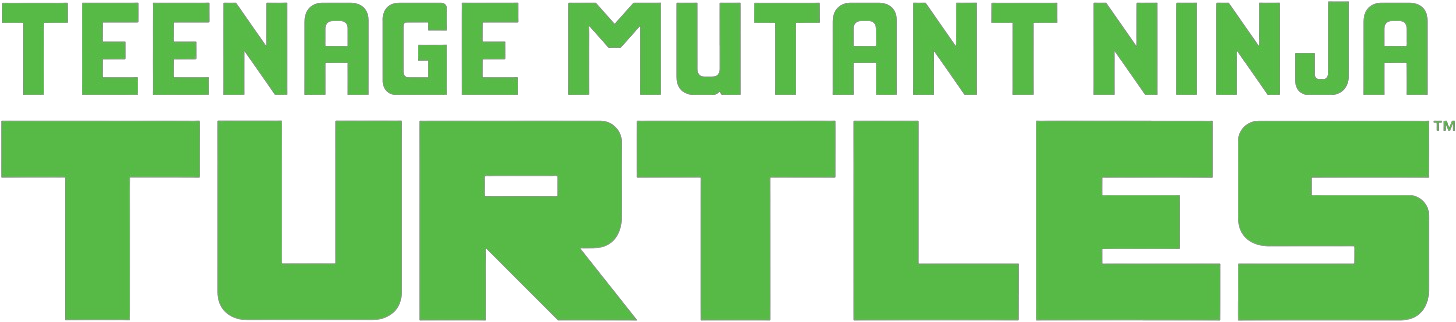
- Franchise logo as of 2022
- Created by: Kevin Eastman; Peter Laird
- Original work: Teenage Mutant Ninja Turtles (1984)
- Owners: Mirage Studios (1984–2009); Nickelodeon Group (Skydance) (2009–present)
- Years: 1984–present

Print publications
- Comics: List of comics
- Comic strip: See list of comics

Films and television
- Films: List of films
- Television series: List of television series
- Animated series: See list of television series
- Television film: See list of films
- Direct-to-video: See list of films

Games
- Role-playing: Teenage Mutant Ninja Turtles & Other Strangeness
- Video games: List of video games

Miscellaneous
- Toys: Action figures Lego Teenage Mutant Ninja Turtles
- Characters: List of characters

Teenage Mutant Ninja Turtles (TMNT) is an American media franchise created by comic book artists Kevin Eastman and Peter Laird. It follows Leonardo, Donatello, Raphael and Michelangelo, four anthropomorphic turtle brothers trained in ninjutsu who fight evil in New York City. The franchise encompasses printed media, television series, feature films, video games, and merchandise.

The franchise began as a comic book, Teenage Mutant Ninja Turtles, which Eastman and Laird conceived as a parody of elements popular in superhero comics at the time. The first issue was published in 1984 by Eastman and Laird's company Mirage Studios and was a surprise success. In 1987, Eastman and Laird licensed the characters to Playmates Toys, which developed a line of Turtles action figures. About $1.1 billion worth of Turtles toys were sold between 1988 and 1992, making them the third-bestselling toy figures ever at the time.

The action figures were promoted with an animated series, which premiered in 1987 and ran for almost a decade. It was succeeded by several other television series. The first Turtles video game was released in 1989, the first of several developed by the Japanese company Konami. The first Turtles film, released in 1990, became the highest-grossing independent film up to that point.

Eastman sold his share of the Turtles franchise to Laird in 2000. In 2009, Laird sold it to Viacom, now Skydance. The franchise has continued with a new comic book series, television series, films and video games.

== History ==
=== 1983–1986: conception and first comics ===
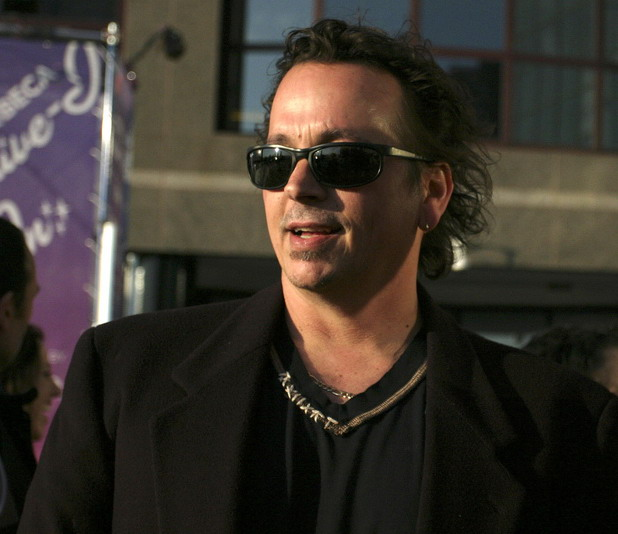
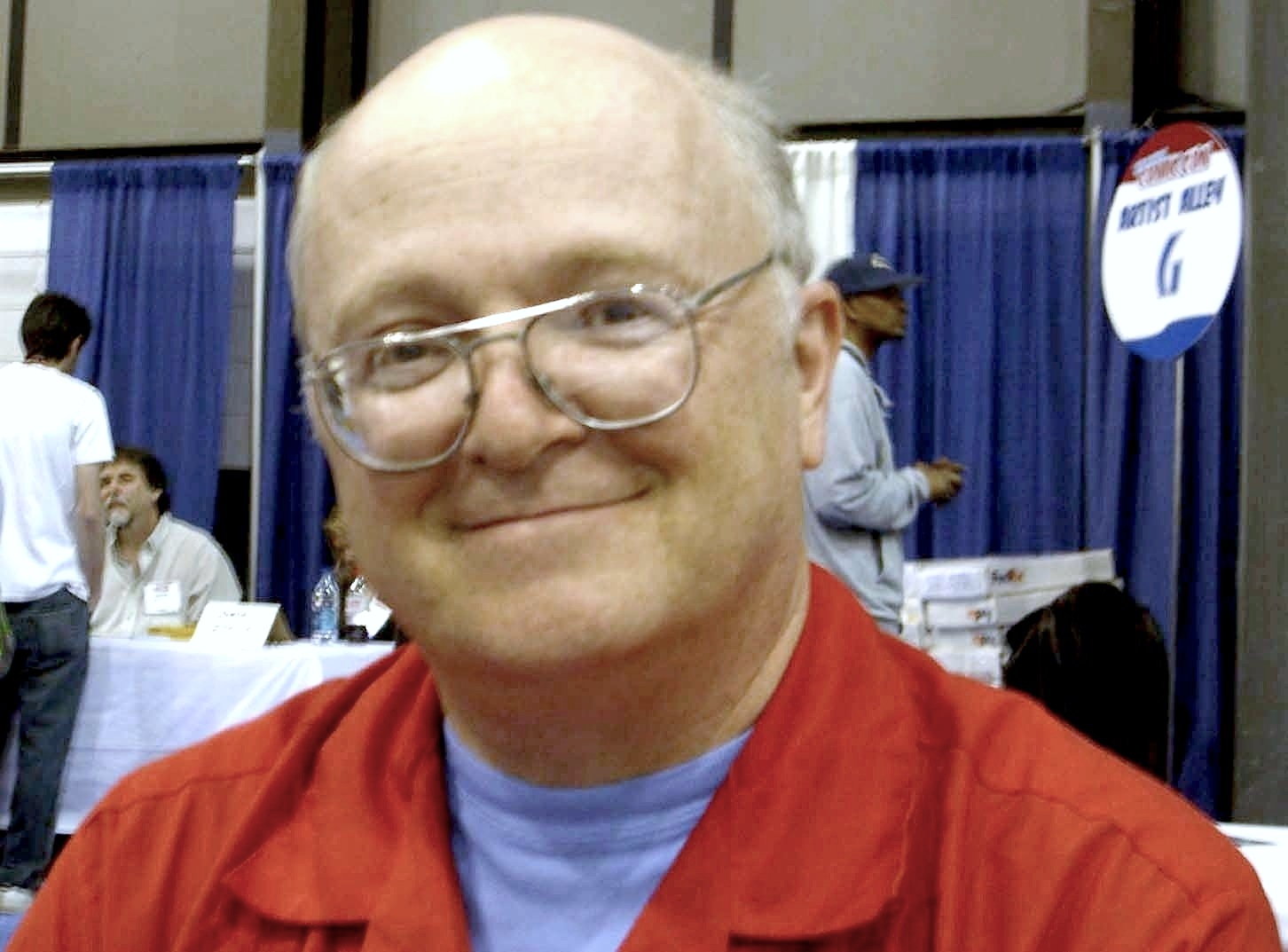
Co-creators Kevin Eastman (top) and Peter Laird

The comic book authors Kevin Eastman and Peter Laird met in Massachusetts and began working on illustrations together. In 1983, Laird invited Eastman to move in with him in Dover, New Hampshire. That November, Eastman drew a masked turtle standing on its hind legs armed with nunchucks to make Laird laugh. Laird added the words "teenage mutant". The concept parodied several elements popular in superhero comics of the time — the teenagers of New Teen Titans, the mutants of Uncanny X-Men and the ninja skills of Daredevil — combined with the comic tradition of funny animals such as Howard the Duck.

Cover of Teenage Mutant Ninja Turtles No. 1 (May 1984)

Eastman and Laird developed the concept into a comic book. They considered giving the turtles Japanese names, but instead named them after the Italian Renaissance artists Leonardo, Donatello, Raphael, and Michelangelo, which Laird said "felt just quirky enough to fit the concept". They developed a backstory referencing further elements of Daredevil: like Daredevil, the Turtles are altered by radioactive material, and their sensei, Splinter, is a play on Daredevil's sensei, Stick.

In March 1984, Eastman and Laird founded a comic book company, Mirage Studios, in their home. Using money from a tax refund and a loan from Eastman's uncle, they printed copies of the first issue of Teenage Mutant Ninja Turtles and advertised it in Comics Buyer's Guide. This attracted the interest of comic distributors, and all 3,000 copies were sold in a few weeks. Sales of further issues continued to climb.

=== 1987–1989: toys, animation and video games ===
In 1987, Eastman and Laird licensed Turtles to Playmates Toys. Between 1988 and 1997, Playmates produced Turtles toys including around 400 figures and dozens of vehicles and playsets. About US$1.1 billion toys were sold in four years, making Turtles the third-bestselling toy figures ever at the time, behind GI Joe and Star Wars.

Influenced by the success of G.I. Joe, He-Man and Transformers, which had promoted toy lines with animated series, Playmates worked with the animation studio Murakami-Wolf-Swenson to produce the first Turtles animated series, which premiered in 1987 and ran for almost a decade. It introduced Turtles elements such as their color-coded masks, catchphrases, love of pizza and distinct personalities. To make it acceptable to parents and television networks, the animated series had a lighter tone than the comics, with no expletives, less violence and less threatening villains. In the UK, the franchise was renamed Teenage Mutant Hero Turtles due to the violent connotations of the word "ninja".

In response to concerns that the series was drifting from its origins, Eastman and Laird published an editorial in the comic in 1989, writing: "We've allowed the wacky side to happen, and enjoy it very much. All the while, though, we've kept the originals very much ours." Eastman later said they regretted approving some projects, and Laird wrote of his dislike for the softer tone of the animated series. The first Turtles video game was released for the Nintendo Entertainment System (NES) in 1989, the first of several developed by the Japanese company Konami. It sold approximately four million copies, making it one of the bestselling NES games.

=== 1990s: first films, franchise expansion and commercial peak ===
The franchise reached its commercial peak in the early 1990s. The first Turtles film was released in 1990, featuring costumes designed by Jim Henson's Creature Shop. It was based more closely on the comic than the animated series, with a darker tone. It was the fourth-highest-grossing film of 1990 and broke the record for the highest-grossing independent film, earning more than US$200 million worldwide.

A second film, The Secret of the Ooze, was released in 1991. With a rushed production and a lighter tone, it received weaker reviews and was less successful at the box office. Teenage Mutant Ninja Turtles III (1993) was aimed at the Japanese market, the largest foreign market for US films at the time, but failed to see release there and had weaker reviews and sales.

In 1990, a stage musical featuring the Turtles as a rock band, Coming Out of Their Shells, played 40 shows across the United States. The musical was sponsored by Pizza Hut and promoted with an appearance on The Oprah Winfrey Show. A soundtrack album and VHS were released. After the animated series ended, a live-action television series, Ninja Turtles: The Next Mutation, was created in 1997 with Saban Entertainment. It introduced a fifth, female turtle, Venus de Milo. The series was canceled after one season. Eastman later said he liked the series, while Laird said it was the only Turtles project he "truly regrets".

=== 2000–present: relaunches and sale to Viacom ===
Eastman sold his share of the Turtles franchise to Laird in 2000. In 2003, 4Kids Entertainment launched a new animated series, which ran for seven seasons, concluding in 2009. Laird had a role in the production, creating a closer adaptation of the original comic. A computer-animated Turtles film, TMNT, was released in 2007.

On October 21, 2009, it was announced that Laird had sold the franchise to Viacom. He said he had tired of working on Turtles, writing: "I am no longer that guy who carries his sketchbook around with him and draws in it every chance he gets." In August 2011, IDW Publishing launched a new Turtles comic series, with Eastman as co-writer and illustrator. A third animated series premiered in September 2012 on Nickelodeon, and ran for five seasons before ending in 2017. A live-action Turtles film directed by Jonathan Liebesman and produced by Michael Bay was released in August 2014. It received negative reviews but was a box-office success. A sequel, Out of the Shadows, directed by Dave Green, was released in June 2016. It was a box-office bomb and a third film was canceled. A fourth animated series, Rise of the Teenage Mutant Ninja Turtles, premiered in 2018 and ran for two seasons. A film sequel was released in 2022 on Netflix.

Mutant Mayhem, an animated film directed by Jeff Rowe and produced by Seth Rogen, was released in August 2023; several critics named it the best Turtles film. A followup series, Tales of the Teenage Mutant Ninja Turtles, premiered in 2024 on Paramount+ and ran for two seasons. It was canceled in 2025 following management shifts caused by the Paramount-Skydance merger. Later in 2025, Paramount ended its agreement with Playmates Toys, concluding Playmates' nearly 40-year long tenure as the manufacturer of Turtles toys. In February 2026, Mattel acquired the Turtles toy license.

== Characters ==
In most versions, the Teenage Mutant Ninja Turtles are created when four baby turtles are exposed to radioactive ooze, mutating them into humanoids. They fight evil in New York City, where they reside in the sewers.

Leonardo, the leader, is the most disciplined and skilled turtle. An expert swordsman, he wields two katana and wears a blue bandana. Raphael, the strongest and most quick-tempered turtle, wears a red bandana and uses a pair of sai. Donatello uses his intellect to invent gadgets and vehicles. He wears a purple bandana and uses a bō staff. Michelangelo is the least disciplined and most fun-loving, and is usually portrayed as the fastest and most agile. He wears an orange bandana and uses nunchucks.

Splinter is a mutant rat who is the wise adoptive father of the Turtles and teaches them ninjutsu. In some iterations, he was once the pet rat of ninja master Hamato Yoshi; in others, he is a mutated Yoshi. The Turtles are assisted by April O'Neil, who is variously depicted as a news reporter, lab assistant or genius computer programmer. In most versions, she is pursued romantically by Casey Jones, a hockey mask-wearing vigilante who usually becomes an ally of the Turtles.

The Turtles' nemesis is the Shredder, a criminal mastermind in samurai-like armor, who leads the ninja clan known as the Foot Clan. His real identity is usually the ninja Oroku Saki. In most versions, the Shredder's second in command is Karai, a skilled martial artist; in some iterations she is the Shredder's daughter. In some versions, the Shredder allies with Baxter Stockman, a mad scientist, and Krang, an alien warlord from Dimension X. Krang was introduced in the original animated series, was inspired by the Utrom race from the comics, and is sometimes depicted as an Utrom himself. Also created for the series were the Shredder's buffoonish henchmen, Bebop and Rocksteady, a mutant warthog and rhinoceros.

== Comics ==
=== Mirage Studios (1984–2014) ===
Eastman and Laird's Teenage Mutant Ninja Turtles premiered in May 1984, at a comic book convention held at a local Sheraton Hotel in Portsmouth, New Hampshire. It was published by their company Mirage Studios in an oversized magazine-style format using black and white artwork on cheap newsprint, limited to a print run of 3000 copies. It was initially intended as a one-shot, but due to its popularity it became an ongoing series.

After publication was temporarily assumed by Image Comics for the third volume, Laird (by then the sole owner of the franchise) and Lawson relaunched the main series at Mirage with a fourth volume in 2001. Following the sale of the franchise to Nickelodeon in late 2009, Laird retained the right to continue the Mirage series, but no issues have been released since issue #32 in 2014, and Mirage Studios closed in 2021.

The main Mirage series was published for 129 issues across four volumes. Additional one-shot issues and miniseries were also published. Mirage published a companion book, Tales of the Teenage Mutant Ninja Turtles, designed to fill in the gaps of continuity in the TMNT universe.

Starting in September of 2026 IDW has started reprinting these comics in their "classic collections" line of trade paperbacks.

=== Archie Comics (1988–1995) ===
From 1988 to 1995, Archie Comics published Teenage Mutant Ninja Turtles Adventures, a series aimed at a younger audience. Initially adapting episodes of the first animated series, it soon moved to original storylines. The main series ran for 72 issues; in addition, there were numerous annuals, specials and miniseries. An ongoing spin-off series, Mighty Mutanimals, features a team of supporting characters.

=== Image Comics (1996–1999) ===
In 1996, Image Comics co-founder Erik Larsen, seeing that there were no TMNT comics in active publication, oversaw a relaunch of the comics through Highbrow Productions, his studio at Image, with writing by Gary Carlson and art by Frank Fosco. This third volume of the main series, intended as a continuation of the Mirage comics, saw Splinter become a bat, Donatello a cyborg, Leonardo lose a hand and Raphael become scarred and assume the identity of the new Shredder. The series was canceled in 1999 after 23 issues without a conclusion. In 2018, IDW began reprinting the series in full color as Teenage Mutant Ninja Turtles: Urban Legends, and commissioned Carlson and Fusco to create three additional issues to tie up the unfinished story.

=== Dreamwave Productions (2003) ===
A monthly comic inspired by the 2003 TV series was published by Dreamwave Productions from June to December 2003. It was written by Peter David and illustrated by LeSean Thomas. In the first four issues, which were the only ones directly adapted from the TV series, the story was told from the perspectives of April, Baxter, Casey, and a pair of New York City police officers.

=== IDW Publishing (2011–present) ===
In 2011, IDW Publishing acquired the license to publish new collections of Mirage storylines and a new ongoing series. The first issue of the new series was released in August of that year. Eastman and Tom Waltz wrote the book, and Eastman and Dan Duncan provided the art. In 2017 issue #73 of the comic was published, making it the longest-running comic series in the franchise's history. In addition to the main series and spin-offs set within its continuity, IDW also published comics based on the 2012 Turtles animated series and the 2018 animated series, Rise of the Teenage Mutant Ninja Turtles. The volume one of the series ended in April 2024 at issue #150, while volume two was released three months later in July.

=== Manga ===
The Turtles have appeared in several manga series.

- Mutant Turtles (ミュータント・タートルズ, Myūtanto Tātoruzu) is a 15-issue series by Tsutomu Oyamada, Zuki mora, and Yoshimi Hamada that simply adapted episodes of the original American animated series.
- Super Turtles (スーパータートルズ Sūpā Tātoruzu) is a three-issue miniseries by Hidemasa Idemitsu, Tetsurō Kawade, and Toshio Kudō that featured the "TMNT Supermutants" Turtle toys that were on sale at the time. The first volume of the anime miniseries followed this storyline.
- Mutant Turtles Gaiden (ミュータント・タートルズ外伝, Myūtanto Tātoruzu Gaiden) by Hiroshi Kanno is a reinterpretation of the Turtles story with no connection to the previous manga.
- Mutant Turtles III (ミュータント・タートルズ３, Myūtanto Tātoruzu Tsuri) is Yasuhiko Hachino's adaptation of the third feature film.
- Mutant Turtles '95 (ミュータント・タートルズ９５, Myūtanto Tātoruzu Kyūjūgo) is a 1995 series by Ogata Nobu which ran in Comic BomBom.
- Mutant Turtles '96 (ミュータント・タートルズ９６, Myūtanto Tātoruzu Kyūjūroku) is a continuation of the 1995 series that continued to run through 1996.

=== Comic strip ===
A daily comic strip written and illustrated by Dan Berger began in 1990. It featured an adventure story Monday through Friday and activity puzzles on weekends (with fan art appearing later). The comic strip was published in syndication until its cancelation in December 1996. It was published in more than 250 newspapers at its highest point in popularity.

== Television series ==
=== First animated series (1987–1996) ===
The first Turtles series debuted 1987 as a five-part miniseries and became a regular Saturday-morning syndicated series on October 1, 1988. It follows the adventures of the turtles and their allies as they battle Shredder, Krang, and other villains in New York City. The series was changed considerably from the darker-toned comics, to make it more suitable for children and families. Produced by Fred Wolf Films, the series ran for ten seasons and ended in 1996.

=== Original video animation (1996) ===
In addition to the American series, a Japan-exclusive two-episode anime original video animation (OVA) series was made in 1996, titled Mutant Turtles: Choujin Densetsu-hen. The OVA is similar in tone to the 1987 TV series and uses the same voices from TV Tokyo's Japanese dub of the 1987 TV series. It featured the Turtles as superheroes, that gained costumes and superpowers with the use of Mutastones, while Shredder, Bebop and Rocksteady gained supervillain powers with the use of a Dark Mutastone.

=== Live-action series (1997–1998) ===
In 1997–1998, a live-action series, Ninja Turtles: The Next Mutation, aired on Fox. It introduced a female turtle, Venus de Milo, skilled in the mystical arts of the shinobi. The Next Mutation Turtles made a guest appearance on Power Rangers in Space. The Next Mutation was canceled after one season of 26 episodes.

=== Second animated series (2003–2009) ===
In 2003, a new Teenage Mutant Ninja Turtles series, produced by 4Kids Entertainment, began airing on FoxBox. It moved to "The CW4Kids" block. The series was co-produced by Mirage Studios, and Mirage owned one-third of the rights to the series. Mirage's stake in creative control resulted in a cartoon closer to the original comics, creating a darker tone than the 1987 cartoon, though still considered appropriate for younger viewers. This series lasted until 2009, ending with a feature-length television film, Turtles Forever, which was produced for the 25th anniversary of the franchise.

=== Third animated series (2012–2017) ===
Nickelodeon acquired the global rights to Teenage Mutant Ninja Turtles from the Mirage Group and 4Kids Entertainment, Inc. and produced a new CGI-animated TMNT television series. The 2012 version is characterized by anime-like iconography and emphasis on mutagen continuing to wreak havoc on the everyday lives of the Turtles and their enemies; in addition, the tone of this version is similar to the original series, but also features a handful of serious episodes as well. The series ran for five seasons and ended in 2017.

=== Fourth animated series (2018–2020) ===
Rise of the Teenage Mutant Ninja Turtles was the second Nickelodeon-produced animated series in the franchise and premiered in September 2018. It returned to using 2D animation, while also using some anime iconography, and was characterized by its lighter humor. The series aired between 2018 and 2020, and was followed by a feature film released on Netflix in 2022.

=== Fifth animated series (2024–2025) ===
A two-season 2D animated television series spin-off of the Teenage Mutant Ninja Turtles: Mutant Mayhem film, Tales of the Teenage Mutant Ninja Turtles, was released in 2024 and 2025 for Paramount+, produced by Point Grey, who also produced the film.

== Films ==
The Turtles have starred in eight theatrical feature films. The first three are live-action features produced in the early 1990s: Teenage Mutant Ninja Turtles (1990), Teenage Mutant Ninja Turtles II: The Secret of the Ooze (1991), and Teenage Mutant Ninja Turtles III (1993). The Turtles were played by various actors in costumes featuring animatronic heads, initially produced by Jim Henson's Creature Shop. The computer-animated sequel TMNT was released in 2007.

A reboot, Teenage Mutant Ninja Turtles, produced by Platinum Dunes, Nickelodeon Movies, and Paramount Pictures was released in 2014. A sequel, Out of the Shadows, was released in 2016. In 2022 Nickelodeon Movies released Rise of the Teenage Mutant Ninja Turtles: The Movie as a sequel to the animated series of the same name. A computer-animated reboot, Teenage Mutant Ninja Turtles: Mutant Mayhem, was released in 2023.

== Merchandise ==
The franchise generated merchandise sales of $175 million in 1988 and $350 million in 1989. By May 1990, it had generated $650 million in domestic retail revenues. By 1994, it was the most merchandisable franchise, having generated total revenue of $6 billion in merchandise sales up until then. The brand generated more than $1 billion in retail sales from 2003 to 2005.

=== Toys ===
During the run of the 1987 TV series, Playmates Toys produced hundreds of TMNT action figures, along with vehicles, playsets, and accessories, becoming one of the top collectibles for children. Staff artists at Northampton, Massachusetts-based Mirage Studios provided conceptual designs for many of the figures, vehicles, and playsets and creator credit can be found in the legal text printed on the back of the toy packaging. In addition, Playmates produced a series of TMNT/Star Trek crossover figures, due to Playmates holding the Star Trek action-figure license at the time. Playmates employed many design groups to develop looks and styles for the toy line, including Bloom Design, White Design, Pangea Corporation, Robinson-Clarke, and McHale Design. The marketing vice president of Playmates, Karl Aaronian, was largely responsible for assembling the team of designers and writers, including John Schulte and John Besmehn, who provided the seminal writing and copy for the toy line, which in turn, filtered through to the various iterations of the television series.

Never before in toy history did an action-figure line have such an impact for over two decades, generating billions of dollars in licensing revenue. The series was highly popular in the UK, where in the run-up to Christmas, the Army & Navy Store in London's Lewisham devoted its entire basement to everything Turtle, including games, videos, costumes, and other items. Playmates continued to produce TMNT action figures based on the 2003 animated series. The 2007 film TMNT also gave Playmates a new source from which to make figures, while National Entertainment Collectibles Association produced a series of high-quality action figures based on character designs from the original Mirage comics. In 2012, a new toy line and a new classic toy line from Playmates were announced to be released.

== Video games ==
In 1989, the Japanese company Konami released the first TMNT game for the Nintendo Entertainment System (NES). It was followed in the same year by a TMNT arcade game, which was ported to the NES as Teenage Mutant Ninja Turtles II: The Arcade Game. In 1991, Konami released The Manhattan Project for the NES, and another arcade game, Turtles in Time, which was ported to the Super Nintendo Entertainment System (SNES) in 1992. Later in 1992, Konami released The Hyperstone Heist for the Sega Genesis, using many elements from Turtles in Time.

Konami also released a series of TMNT games for the handheld Game Boy console: Fall of the Foot Clan (1990), Back from the Sewers (1991) and Radical Rescue (1993). A PC game, Manhattan Missions was also released. Konami's last entries during the original run were Teenage Mutant Ninja Turtles: Tournament Fighters, a set of one-on-one fighting game released for the NES, SNES, and Genesis; each version is a wholly distinct game, sharing only the title and genre in common.

In September 2002, Konami also acquired the license to adapt the 2003 TV series into a video game franchise, resulting in a new series of games with 3D gameplay inspired by the old TMNT beat 'em up games, consisting of Teenage Mutant Ninja Turtles (2003 video game), Teenage Mutant Ninja Turtles 2: Battle Nexus, Teenage Mutant Ninja Turtles 3: Mutant Nightmare, and TMNT: Mutant Melee.

In 2006, Ubisoft acquired the rights for TMNT games, beginning with a game based on the 2007 animated feature film, along with a distinct game for the Game Boy Advance similar in style to the Konami arcade games. A beat 'em up game Teenage Mutant Ninja Turtles: Arcade Attack was released for the Nintendo DS in 2009, to coincide with the series' 25th anniversary.

In 2013, Activision released the downloadable game Teenage Mutant Ninja Turtles: Out of the Shadows, based on the 2012 TV series and developed by Red Fly Studio for the Xbox Live Arcade, PlayStation Network and Steam.

In 2016, Activision and PlatinumGames developed Teenage Mutant Ninja Turtles: Mutants in Manhattan for the PlayStation 4, PlayStation 3, Xbox One, Xbox 360, and PC. The game is described as a third-person, team-based brawler. The campaign is playable either single-player or co-op and has an original story written by Tom Waltz, IDW comic writer and editor. The art style is based on longtime TMNT comic artist Mateus Santolouco.

Teenage Mutant Ninja Turtles Legends, a free-to-play Role-playing video game was released by Ludia in summer 2016 for iPhone, iPad, Android, and Kindle Fire. It is based on the 2012 TV series.

The turtles are playable characters in the DC Comics fighting game Injustice 2 as a part of the "Fighter Pack 3" DLC, with Corey Krueger, Joe Brugie, Ben Rausch and Ryan Cooper voicing their roles.

The 1987 versions of Leonardo, Michelangelo, April O'Neil and Shredder appear as playable characters in the 2021 platform fighting game Nickelodeon All-Star Brawl; the 2023 sequel, Nickelodeon All-Star Brawl 2, features Raphael and Donatello, as well as the returning April, and with the addition of Rocksteady, who was announced as a DLC. In the games, Cam Clarke, Townsend Coleman, Barry Gordon, Rob Paulsen, and Jim Cummings reprise their roles from the 1987 animated series while Abby Trott voices April. The turtles also appeared as playable characters in the 2017 fighting game Brawlhalla.

The beat 'em up Shredder's Revenge was released in June 2022. It is inspired by the 1987 Turtles animated series and the early Konami games.

In March 2023, Paramount Global announced that a AAA video game based on The Last Ronin, a 5-issue miniseries that was published from 2020 to 2022, was in development. Doug Rosen, senior vice president for games and emerging media at Paramount Global, mentioned the game will a single player third-person Action-RPG with elements taken from the recent God of War games. It is currently being developed by an unnamed studio and would likely be a "few years off" from release, according to Rosen. In August 2023, it was revealed that the game would be developed by Black Forest Games, published by THQ Nordic, and release on PlayStation 5, Xbox Series X/S, and Windows.

== In other media ==
=== Tabletop role playing game ===
In 1985, Palladium Books published Teenage Mutant Ninja Turtles & Other Strangeness. It is a standalone game, but uses the many key mechanics from Palladium's Megaversal system and is compatible with material from other Palladium games. It introduced rules for creating anthropomorphic animal mutants. Examples of mutants are included in the appendices as potential antagonists, including the Terror Bears, Caesars Weasels, and Sparrow Eagles, as well as including stats for the Turtles and other characters. A series of supplements were released over the next few years, which remained in print until, due to the cost of maintaining the license, Palladium decided to end its license with Mirage Studios in January 2000.

=== Trading card game ===
In 2004, Upper Deck released the Teenage Mutant Ninja Turtles Trading Card Game, based on the cartoon series of the same name. Two expansions were planned but never released.

In 2026, Wizards of the Coast released an expansion for Magic: The Gathering based on Teenage Mutant Ninja Turtles as part of its Universes Beyond collaborations.

=== Food tie-ins ===
During the height of their popularity, the Turtles had a number of food tie-ins. There were also four TMNT mail away items available to order from Hostess and Royal OOZE Gelatin Desserts, distributed by Nabisco under "Royal Gelatin" in three different flavors: orange, strawberry, and lime. Shreddies was a Canadian cereal with TMNT-themed box art and promos. One example of a TMNT prize was rings featuring a character from the cartoon (1992). Chef Boyardee also released a canned pasta with the pasta in the shapes of the four turtles. There were multiple versions of the pasta released, including one with Shredder added into the shapes. Customers could mail away for an exclusive Shredder action figure that was darker than the standard Playmates figure, it was shipped in a plastic baggy. This Shredder is one of the more valuable TMNT action figures today.

=== Concert tours ===
To capitalize on the Turtles' popularity, a concert tour was held in 1990, premiering at Radio City Music Hall on August 17. The "Coming Out of Their Shells" tour featured live-action turtles playing music as a band (Donatello on keyboards; Leonardo on bass guitar; Raphael on drums and saxophone; and Michelangelo on guitar) on stage around a familiar plotline: April O'Neil is kidnapped by the Shredder, and the Turtles have to rescue her. The story had a very Bill & Ted-esque feel, with its theme of the power of rock n' roll literally defeating the enemy, in the form of the Shredder (who only rapped about how he hates music) trying to eliminate all music. A pay-per-view special highlighting the concert was shown, and a studio album was also released. A behind-the-scenes video, The Making Of the Coming Out of Their Shells Tour, depicts the characters as real-life people without explaining the mechanics of the faces and costumes. A second tour, Gettin' Down in Your Town, was less successful.

=== Roller coasters and amusement rides ===
Nickelodeon Universe at American Dream Meadowlands in East Rutherford, New Jersey, which opened in 2019, contains several TMNT themed rides, including two coasters that broke world records upon their opening. The TMNT Shellraiser, a Gerstlauer Euro-Fighter, is the steepest roller coaster in the world at 121.5 degrees. The Shredder, a spinning roller coaster themed to the Shredder, is the world's longest free-spinning coaster where riders could spin the car freely along the track, with a length of 1,322 feet (403 m) and a maximum height of 62 feet (19 m).

Nickelodeon Universe at Mall of America in Bloomington, Minnesota, also contains rides themed to the TMNT franchise. These include Teenage Mutant Ninja Turtles Shell Shock, a roller coaster that opened in 2012, and Shredder's Mutant Masher, a pendulum ride that opened in 2015.

In the Dream Island in Moscow, one of the nine zones is themed after Teenage Mutant Ninja Turtles, licensed from Paramount.

Majaland Gdańsk in Osowa, Gdańsk, which opened in 2024, contains ride Lot Żółwiem themed after TMNT, as well tie-ins to franchise, thanks to the signing of an agreement between the Nickelodeon and park's owner, Momentum Leisure.

=== Parodies ===
Although TMNT had originated as something of a parody, the comic's explosive success led to a wave of small-press, black and white comic parodies of TMNT itself, including Adolescent Radioactive Black Belt Hamsters, Pre-Teen Dirty-Gene Kung-Fu Kangaroos, and a host of others. Dark Horse Comics' Boris the Bear was launched in response to these TMNT clones; its first issue was titled "Boris the Bear Slaughters the Teenage Radioactive Black Belt Mutant Ninja Critters". Once the Turtles broke into the mainstream, parodies also proliferated in other media, such as in satire magazines Cracked and Mad and numerous TV series of the period. The satirical British television series Spitting Image featured a recurring sketch "Teenage Mutant Ninja Turds". Samurai Pizza Cats is also considered a parody of the Turtles franchise, including a line in the opening theme song 'they've got more fur than any turtle ever had', and an episode 1 reference to 'A retirement home for aging ninja turtles'.

== Wider impact ==
NASA let a logo with a Ninja Turtle be designed for the Multi-Purpose Logistics Module.

== See also ==
- Ninjas in popular culture
- Cultural depictions of turtles

== Bibliography ==
- Eastman, Kevin (2002). Kevin Eastman's Teenage Mutant Ninja Turtles Artobiography. Los Angeles: Heavy Metal. ISBN 1-882931-85-8.
- Wiater, Stanley (1991). The Official Teenage Mutant Ninja Turtles Treasury. New York: Villard. ISBN 0-679-73484-8.
