= Stan MacGovern =

American cartoonist (1903–1975)

Stan MacGovern self-portrait in this Silly Milly promotional strip (March 1942)

Stan MacGovern (1903 – 1975) was a cartoonist best known for his comic strip Silly Milly which ran in the New York Post from the 1930s into the 1950s.

Born in New York, MacGovern was the son of George M. Cohan's publicist. His mother performed in light operas. Graduating from high school in 1921, MacGovern began at the New York Sun Herald as a copy boy in the art department. After a period working as a jazz musician, he returned to commercial art with a position at the New York Post where he was employed for years, eventually heading up the newspaper's art department.

== Comic strips and editorial cartoons ==
MacGovern was 18 when he sold his first comic strip, Dumbell Dan (1922–23). In June 1938, he began a cartoon feature, Extra Extra with satirical commentary on minor news events. Distributed by American Feature Syndicate, it was soon retitled Swing with the News. After the character Silly Milly became the strip's central character, the title was finally changed to Silly Milly. MacGovern continued to focus on human interest news items, and he sometimes incorporated reviews of Broadway shows into the strip. MacGovern's Silly Milly is unrelated to characters with the same name in the British publication Twinkle, the children's book by Wendy Cheyette Lewison and the Silly Milly doll (originally named Milly Magpie) distributed by Portable Playhouse to children in hospitals.

McGovern also drew editorial cartoons for the Post.

On April 1, 1948, he participated in the Newspaper Comics Council Comic Strip Ball at the Hotel Plaza. Contributing cartoonists for that United Nations Appeal for Children promotional event included MacGovern, Al Capp, Bill Holman, Ernie Bushmiller, Bob Brinkerhoff, Rube Goldberg and Milton Caniff. Original drawings were auctioned with proceeds going to the United Nations Appeal for Children Overseas Aid.

His work was an influence on cartoonist Jack Mendelsohn, the creator of Jackys Diary, and animation director Will Finn.

Silly Milly, which had limited syndication by the Post to other newspapers, came to an end in 1951. MacGovern, who lived in Malverne, New York, left the newspaper field to run a gift shop on Long Island. It was an unsuccessful business, and he later worked at a Long Island furniture store. At the age of 72, he committed suicide in 1975.

== Exhibitions ==
His editorial cartoons were included in a 2004 exhibit, "Cartoonists Against the Holocaust: Art in the Service of Humanity," sponsored by the David S. Wyman Institute for Holocaust Studies, which also included the work of editorial cartoonists Eric Godal, Arthur Szyk, A. W. MacKenzie and Charles Werner.
