= Pangea Corporation =

Animation and toy industry company

- Industry: Entertainment
- Headquarters: United States

Pangea Corporation is an entertainment development and creative services company that specializes in animation and toy industries. The company was part of the original creative team that launched the Teenage Mutant Ninja Turtles for Playmates Toys and Fred Wolf Films, the animation concern behind the property.

In the early 1990s, Pangea kept pace with trends and launched a business-to-business platform called Toy Network, which was purchased by an internet IPO company, Internos. Toy Network had gained prominence as a child-centered service on Apple's eWorld and America Online. As content providers and programmers for the kids channel, the company continued to grow with new technologies and helped develop a series of virtual pets, Nano for Playmates Toys and Tamagotchi for Bandai America. They also provided scripting and programming solutions for the innovative and interactive line of "Amazing" dolls from Playmates, and products from a variety of other manufacturers, including Brian the Brain, Yano, and Wittley. Additionally, the company set up some of the first ever websites for the toy industry, including domains for Bandai America, Speed Racer and Whac-A-Mole. During this period, Pangea also produced a radio program on the national kids' radio network, Radio AAHS.

After a two-year development deal with DIC Entertainment, where then CEO Andy Heyward declared Pangea the "core development team" for DIC, Pangea's reputation in the animation industry grew further, having been lauded by their work on the seminal and creatively humorous Ninja Turtles. Their list of credits ranged from the sublime "The Brotherhood" to the exploitive "New Kids on the Block".

Prior to their formation, the three partners of Pangea Corporation, John Schulte, John Besmehn and Cheryl Ann Wong, were each accomplished in their own right. Schulte had completed a teleplay that was produced by Garry Marshall and was working as a writer of commercials and presentations for Tomy Toys. Besmehn was a performance artists and part of the group that helped relaunch the Pasadena Playhouse under the stewardship of entrepreneur developer David Houck. Wong was managing her marketing accounts with the City of Los Angeles, City of Pasadena and the LA County Metropolitan Transit Authority.

Pangea has developed a number of entertainment and toy properties, including Speed Racer, Zorro, Biker Mice from Mars, Gormiti, The Mask, Mirmo, The Coneheads, Toonsylvania, The Mummy, Zorro: Generation Z, Freedom Ops Net, Dragon Ball Z and others.

Pangea Corporation operates in the South Orange County city of Dana Point, California. In addition to developing animated and toy content, they are also teamed up with veteran television writer, Fred Fox Jr., on new intellectual properties, including the new musical, "Bubblegum" and the reality-based show, "Becoming Zorro".
