= Greg Carey (voice actor) =

Australian-born voice actor

- Occupation: Voice actor

Greg Carey is an Australian-born voice actor known for his role as Hun in Teenage Mutant Ninja Turtles. Carey joined the Charles Sturt University theatrical production, in Bathurst, New South Wales. Carey started acting in 2001 in Are you Game?, a university project. He became a stage manager for One Thumb Out in the same production facility in 2002. He starred in the same year as Miles Gloriosus in A Funny Thing Happened on the Way to the Forum, another university project. He's also re-done The United Negro College Fund famous tag "A mind is a terrible thing to waste".

== Voice acting ==
- G.I. Joe: Sigma 6 (Additional Voices) 2006
- Teenage Mutant Ninja Turtles (cartoon show) (Hun / Officer Laird / Triceraton Warrior / Leatherhead (as Gary K. Lewis) / Elfinator) 34 episodes, 2003-2009
- Teenage Mutant Ninja Turtles (video game) (Hun) 2003
- Teenage Mutant Ninja Turtles 2: Battle Nexus (video game) (Hun / Traximus / Leatherhead) 2004
- Teenage Mutant Ninja Turtles 3: Mutant Nightmare (video game) (Hun) 2005
- TMNT: Mutant Melee (video game) (Hun / Monster) 2005
- Turtles Forever (film) (Hun) 2009
