= List of Teenage Mutant Ninja Turtles characters =

The following is a list of characters in the Teenage Mutant Ninja Turtles franchise.

== Overview ==
List indicators

This table shows the recurring characters and the actors who have appeared in Teenage Mutant Ninja Turtles throughout the franchise.

- A dark grey cell indicates the character was not in the series or film, or that the character's presence in the series or film has not yet been announced.
- A ^{Y} indicates an appearance as a younger version of a pre-existing character.
- A ^{C} indicates a performance in costume.
- A ^{S} indicates a singing role.
- A ^{D} indicates an appearance in deleted scenes only.
- A ^{M} indicates a motion-capture role.
- A ^{MU} indicates a character is mute.
- A ^{U} indicates an uncredited role.

Character	Television series							Direct to video and television films				
Character	Teenage Mutant Ninja Turtles	Ninja Turtles: The Next Mutation	Teenage Mutant Ninja Turtles	Teenage Mutant Ninja Turtles	Rise of the Teenage Mutant Ninja Turtles	Tales of the Teenage Mutant Ninja Turtles	Teeny Mutant Ninja Turtles	Mutant Turtles: Superman Legend	Turtles Forever	Half-Shell Heroes: Blast to the Past	Batman vs. Teenage Mutant Ninja Turtles	Rise of the Teenage Mutant Ninja Turtles: The Movie
Character	1987–96	1997–98	2003–09	2012–17	2018–20	2024-25	2026	1996	2009	2015	2019	2022
Leonardo ("Leo")	Cam Clarke	Michael Dobson Gabe Khouth^{C} Shishir Inocalla^{C}	Michael Sinterniklaas	Jason Biggs Dominic Catrambone Seth Green Cam Clarke (1987)	Ben Schwartz	Nicolas Cantu	Billy Konsoer	Daiki Nakamura	Michael Sinterniklaas (2003) Dan Green (1987) Jason Griffith (Prime)	Seth Green	Eric Bauza	Ben Schwartz
Donatello ("Donnie")	Barry Gordon Greg Berg	Jason Gray-Stanford Jarred Blancard^{C} Larry Lam^{C}	Sam Riegel	Rob Paulsen Barry Gordon (1987)	Josh Brener	Micah Abbey	Charlie Palmer	Hidenari Ugaki	Sam Riegel (2003) Tony Salerno (1987) Clay Adams (Prime)	Rob Paulsen	Baron Vaughn	Josh Brener
Raphael ("Raph")	Rob Paulsen Thom Pinto Hal Rayle Michael Gough	Matt Hill Mitchell A. Lee Yuen^{C} Dean Choe^{C}	Greg Abbey	Sean Astin Rob Paulsen (1987)	Omar Benson Miller	Brady Noon	Jamir Jones	Hiroyuki Shibamoto	Greg Abbey (2003) Sebastian Arcelus (1987) Sean Schemmel (Prime)	Sean Astin	Darren Criss	Omar Benson Miller
Michelangelo ("Mikey")	Townsend Coleman	Kirby Morrow Richard Yee^{C} David Soo^{C}	Wayne Grayson	Greg Cipes Townsend Coleman (1987)	Brandon Mychal Smith	Shamon Brown Jr.	Jonah Polanco	Toshiharu Sakurai	Wayne Grayson (2003) Johnny Castro (1987) Bradford Cameron (Prime)	Greg Cipes	Kyle Mooney	Brandon Mychal Smith
Splinter	Peter Renaday Townsend Coleman	Stephen Mendel Fiona Scott^{C}	Darren Dunstan	Hoon Lee	Eric Bauza Sander Argabrite^{Y}	Fred Tatasciore Brady Noon	To Be Announced	Hideyuki Umezu	Darren Dunstan (2003) David Wills (1987)		Appeared	Eric Bauza
Hamato Yoshi	Peter Renaday Townsend Coleman		Eric Stuart	Hoon Lee	Eric Bauza Sander Argabrite^{Y}			Hideyuki Umezu			Appeared	Eric Bauza
April O'Neil	Renae Jacobs		Veronica Taylor	Mae Whitman	Kat Graham	Ayo Edebiri	Celina Macias	Emi Shinohara	Veronica Taylor (2003) Rebecca Soler (1987)			Kat Graham
Casey Jones	Pat Fraley		Marc Thompson	Josh Peck	Zelda Williams (Cassandra Jones/Foot Recruit)				Marc Thompson (2003)			Haley Joel Osment (Casey Jones Jr.)
Leatherhead	Jim Cummings Peter Renaday		Frederick B. Owens Gary K. Lewis	Peter Lurie		Rose Byrne						
Slash	Pat Fraley			Corey Feldman								
Irma Langenstein	Jennifer Darling			Kate Micucci		Shelby Young			Appeared			
Mona Lisa	Pat Musick			Zelda Williams								
Miyamoto Usagi	Townsend Coleman		Jason Griffith	Yuki Matsuzaki								
Metalhead	Appeared ^{MU}			Appeared ^{MU}		Max Mittelman						
Wingnut	Rob Paulsen			Daran Norris		Natasia Demetriou						
Venus de Milo Mei Pieh Chi		Lalainia Lindbjerg Nicole Parker^{C} Leslie Sponberg^{C}		Cameo								
Fugitoid			Oliver Wyman	David Tennant								
Renet Tilley			Liza Jacqueline	Ashley Johnson								
Angel			Tara Jayne Carrie Keranen			Jamila Velazquez						
Pigeon Pete				A. J. Buckley		Christopher Mintz-Plasse						
Ice Cream Kitty				Kevin Eastman	Cameo					Kevin Eastman		
Baron Draxum					John Cena Roger Craig Smith							Appeared ^{D}
Antagonists
Shredder	James Avery Dorian Harewood Jim Cummings Townsend Coleman William E. Martin Pat Fraley^{Y}	Doug Parker Patrick Pon^{C}	Scott Rayow	Kevin Michael Richardson Jim Cummings (1987)	Hoon Lee			Kiyoyuki Yanada	Scott Rayow (2003) Load Williams (1987) David Wills (Prime)		Andrew Kishino	
Krang	Pat Fraley		Wayne Grayson	Nolan North (Kraang) Roseanne Barr (Kraang Prime) Rachel Butera (Kraang Prime) Pat Fraley (1987)	Appeared			Hideyuki Umezu	Bradford Scobie			Jim Pirri (Krang One) Toks Olagundoye (Krang Two)
Karai			Karen Neil	Kelly Hu	Gwendoline Yeo		Jenny W. Chan				Karen Neil	
Baxter Stockman	Pat Fraley		Scott Williams	Phil LaMarr	Ramone Hamilton	Cameo					Keith Ferguson	Appeared^{D}
Bishop			David Zen Mansley	Nolan North		Alanna Ubach						Cameo
Rat King	Townsend Coleman		David Zen Mansley	Jeffrey Combs								
Lord Dregg	Tony Jay			Peter Stormare								
Hun			Greg Carey David Zen Mansley	Eric Bauza		Carlin James			Greg Carey			
Bebop	Barry Gordon Greg Berg			J. B. Smoove Barry Gordon (1987)	Cameo	Seth Rogen	To Be Announced	Kyousei Tsukui	Bradford Scobie	J. B. Smoove		
Rocksteady	Cam Clarke			Fred Tatasciore Cam Clarke (80s)	Cameo	Appeared ^{MU}	Brenna Larson	Hidetoshi Nakamura	Johnny Castro	Fred Tatasciore		
Tokka	Rob Paulsen			Appeared ^{MU}		Peter Stormare			Appeared ^{MU}			
Rahzar	Townsend Coleman			Clancy Brown		Ralph Ineson			Appeared ^{MU}			
Chris Bradford				Clancy Brown	Peter Stormare (Kristoff Van Bradford)							
Tiger Claw				Eric Bauza						Eric Bauza		
Hypno-Potamus					Rhys Darby							Rhys Darby
Warren Stone					John Michael Higgins							John Michael Higgins
Big Mama					Lena Heady							Cameo

== Main characters ==
In most versions, the Teenage Mutant Ninja Turtles are created when four baby turtles are exposed to radioactive ooze, transforming them into humanoids.

=== Leonardo ===
Leonardo, nicknamed Leo, is the leader of the ninja turtles, as well as the most disciplined and skilled. Naturally stoic and mature beyond his years, his main priority is to help his brothers to be the best ninjas they can. Because of his leadership, he is often challenged with the constant rebelliousness of Raphael. An expert swordsman, he wields two katanas and wears an ocean blue mask.

=== Donatello ===
Donatello, nicknamed Donnie, is the smartest and gentlest of the Turtles. An intellectual, he often attempts to reach his goals through science and technology rather than through violence and so frequently invents gadgets and vehicles. He is typically the passive turtle and Leonardo's second-in-command, always one step ahead of his brothers and coming up with solutions to complex problems when they cannot. Studying the art of Bojutsu, he wears a purple mask and wields an oak bō.

=== Raphael ===
Raphael, nicknamed Raph, is the most aggressive and temperamental of the turtles. Rebellious, cynical, and quick witted, he is often driven by his strong emotions and is more prone to temper loss than his brothers. He possesses a strong desire for independence, often going rogue whenever opportunity calls for it and displaying disapproval of authority. His quick temper tends to get the better of him, but he openly loves his family, and is fiercely loyal to his allies. He wears a red mask and wields a pair of sai.

=== Michelangelo ===
Michelangelo, nicknamed Mikey, is the least disciplined and most fun-loving turtle. He is usually portrayed as the most agile and naturally gifted, contrasting his free spirit and inability to take training seriously. The most stereotypical teenager of the team, he is an avid fan of pop-culture and often speaks with a surfer dialect. He yearns to live life to the fullest, resulting in a tendency to fool around whenever possible. He wears an orange mask and fights using nunchucks.

=== Splinter ===
Splinter is the mutant rat sensei and adoptive father of the Ninja Turtles. Generally depicted as wise and powerful, he raised the four turtles and trained them in the art of Ninjutsu. He is very cautious and protective of them, constantly warning them of the dangers on the surface. In stark contrast to his coarse gnarly appearance, Splinter always speaks in a quiet gentle dignified voice.

=== April O'Neil ===
April O'Neil is a confident, courageous, benevolent, intelligent, and outgoing human companion of the Ninja Turtles. She met the Turtles when they saved her from a group of Shredder’s henchmen chasing her down the sewers. She embarked on many of the Turtles' adventures and aids them by doing the work in public while the Turtles cannot.

=== Casey Jones ===
Casey Jones is a hockey-masked vigilante, armed with an assortment of sporting goods that he carries in a golf bag. He is a close ally of the Ninja Turtles, whom he met after having a martial-arts skirmish with the temperish Raphael regarding Casey's own inflamed behavior when battling the bad guys.

== Recurring characters ==
=== Hamato Yoshi ===
Hamato Yoshi is a ninjutsu master whose history is always intertwined with Splinter's. In most versions, Splinter is either his pet rat or a mutated form of Yoshi himself.

=== Mighty Mutanimals ===
The Mighty Mutanimals, a superhero group within the Teenage Mutant Ninja Turtles (TMNT) franchise, emerged in the comic-book series Teenage Mutant Ninja Turtles Adventures. Composed of various mutated animals, the team collaborated with the TMNT and has been featured in multiple iterations of the franchise since its inception.

In Teenage Mutant Ninja Turtles: Mutant Mayhem, the Mutanimals are former allies of Superfly who turned on him and allied with the Turtles.

==== Dreadmon ====
Dreadmon is a native of South Africa. During an uprising, his father sent him and his mother to Jamaica, where they suffered from poverty. Dreadmon became a thief and eventually stole a talisman that transformed him into a red wolf hybrid.

Dreadmon appears in the IDW Publishing comics where he is depicted as a mutant black-backed jackal.

==== Jagwar ====
Jagwar is a humanoid jaguar who is the child of a jaguar spirit and a tribal woman named Juntarra. After his mother left to continue her personal quest (completing "The Path of the Four Winds"), Jagwar lived in the rainforests of Brazil until his discovery by the TMNT in issue #14. Soon afterward, Jagwar became the leader of the Mighty Mutanimals.

In IDW Publishing, Jagwar is depicted as an anthropomorphic jaguar goddess and member of the Pantheon.

==== Leatherhead ====
Leatherhead is a mutant American alligator and hot-headed ally of the Ninja Turtles.

In the Mirage continuity, Leatherhead was originally an ordinary alligator who escaped a pet store during a robbery and found his way into the sewers. While in the sewers, Leatherhead was found by a pair of TCRI Utroms and later mutated.

In the Archie Comics series Teenage Mutant Ninja Turtles Adventures, Leatherhead is a human named Jess Harley who lived in the swamps of Florida, and was transformed into a mutant alligator when Dimension X warlord Cherubae uses the Turnstone on him. At first, Shredder lures Leatherhead to work with him, until Leatherhead discovers that the Shredder is a villain. Leatherhead later becomes a wrestling hero at the Stump Asteroid and later a member of the Mighty Mutanimals.

Leatherhead makes his debut in the 49th issue of IDW Publishing's comic series. He appears very briefly, telling Dr. Harold and Professor Honeycutt that he had some mutagen that could be used to help heal Donatello.

==== Leatherhead in other media ====
- Leatherhead appears in Teenage Mutant Ninja Turtles (1987), voiced primarily by Jim Cummings and by Peter Renaday in the episode "Night of the Rogues". This version is a wild alligator who was mutated by mutagen that entered the swamp after a botched mission by Krang and Shredder and later becomes Shredder's ally.
- Leatherhead appears in Teenage Mutant Ninja Turtles (2003), voiced by Frederick B. Owens in the second and third seasons and by Gary K. Lewis in the fourth and seventh seasons. This version was originally an exotic pet who got flushed down to the sewer, where he was found and mutated by the Utroms. He was accidentally left behind during Shredder's attack, which forced the Utroms to flee Earth, and comes to live with the Turtles. After inadvertently attacking Michelangelo, Leatherhead chooses to live in an abandoned subway station near the Turtles' base, allowing him to keep in touch with them while ensuring their safety.
- Leatherhead appears in Teenage Mutant Ninja Turtles (2012), voiced by Peter Lurie. This version was mutated by the Kraang and is a founding member of the Mighty Mutanimals.
- A female incarnation of Leatherhead appears in Teenage Mutant Ninja Turtles: Mutant Mayhem, voiced by Rose Byrne. This version is a member of Superfly's mutant army.
- The Teenage Mutant Ninja Turtles: Mutant Mayhem incarnation of Leatherhead appears in the Tales of the Teenage Mutant Ninja Turtles episode "Night of the Mechazoids" (2024), voiced again by Rose Byrne.
- Leatherhead appears as a boss in Teenage Mutant Ninja Turtles III: The Manhattan Project.
- Leatherhead appears as a boss in Teenage Mutant Ninja Turtles: Turtles in Time. In the 2009 remake of the game, he is voiced by Michael Sinterniklaas.
- Leatherhead appears as a boss in Teenage Mutant Ninja Turtles: The Hyperstone Heist.
- Leatherhead appears as a boss in Teenage Mutant Ninja Turtles 2: Battle Nexus (2004).
- Leatherhead makes a cameo appearance in Teenage Mutant Ninja Turtles 3: Mutant Nightmare (2005).
- Leatherhead appears as a boss in Teenage Mutant Ninja Turtles (2014), voiced by André Sogliuzzo.
- Leatherhead appears in Teenage Mutant Ninja Turtles: Danger of the Ooze (2014), voiced again by André Sogliuzzo.
- Leatherhead appears as a boss in Teenage Mutant Ninja Turtles: Shredder's Revenge (2022), voiced by Sean Gurnsey.
- Leatherhead appears as a boss in Teenage Mutant Ninja Turtles: Splintered Fate (2023), voiced by Keith Ferguson.
- The Teenage Mutant Ninja Turtles: Mutant Mayhem incarnation of Leatherhead appears in Teenage Mutant Ninja Turtles: Mutants Unleashed (2024), voiced by Abby Trott.

==== Mondo Gecko ====
Mondo Gecko is a mutant gecko and one of the first teenage allies of the Ninja Turtles, who shares a close relationship with Michelangelo. He was created by Mirage Studios' artist Ryan Brown.

In the Archie Comics continuity, Mondo Gecko is a skateboarder who played in a local heavy metal band. Mondo was inadvertently exposed to discarded mutagen, which transformed him into a mutant gecko.

This backstory was adapted into the 2012 animated series, where Mondo is voiced by Robbie Rist.

In the 1987 series and Teenage Mutant Ninja Turtles: Mutant Mayhem, Mondo (voiced by Paul Rudd) was originally a normal gecko before being mutated.

Mondo Gecko appears in Teenage Mutant Ninja Turtles: Mutants Unleashed, voiced by Jarred North.

==== Ray Fillet ====
Ray Fillet (originally known as Man Ray) was once a marine biologist named Jack Finney who worked at the Burroughs Aquarium in New Jersey.

He originated in the Archie Comics version of Teenage Mutant Ninja Turtles. Finney was exposed to mutagen after he climbed into a pipe on Bayview Beach that was polluting the water, transforming him into a mutant manta ray.

Ray Fillet appears in the 2023 film Teenage Mutant Ninja Turtles: Mutant Mayhem, voiced by Post Malone.

Ray Fillet appears in Tales of the Teenage Mutant Ninja Turtles, voiced again by Post Malone.

Ray Fillet appears in Teenage Mutant Ninja Turtles: Mutants Unleashed, voiced by Josh Keaton.

==== Wingnut and Screwloose ====
Wingnut and Screwloose are a pair of aliens who respectively resemble a bat and mosquito. The pair are not mutants, but the only surviving members of an alien race after Krang invaded their planet Dexion V in the Huanu system. According to Screwloose, their two species share a symbiotic relationship, with Wingnut providing Screwloose blood and Screwloose providing Wingnut the ability to sleep.

In the 1987 series, Wingnut (voiced by Rob Paulsen) and Screwloose (voiced by Townsend Coleman) are terrorists from the Dimension X planet Flagenon who tried to brainwash the children of their homeworld into invading Earth only to be stopped by the Turtles.

Wingnut and Screwloose appear in the 2012 series, with Wingnut voiced by Daran Norris and Screwloose voiced by Jeff Bennett impersonating Burt Ward. These versions are superhero characters from Michelangelo's comic book who were brought to life by a fragment of the Sol Star.

Wingnut appears in Teenage Mutant Ninja Turtles: Mutants in Manhattan, voiced by Jim Meskimen. This version is an alien bat who works for Krang.

A genderbent version of Wingnut appears in Teenage Mutant Ninja Turtles: Mutant Mayhem, voiced by Natasia Demetriou. This version is a mutant bat.

Wingnut appears in Teenage Mutant Ninja Turtles: Mutants Unleashed, voiced by Alexa Kahn.

Wingnut appears in Tales of the Teenage Mutant Ninja Turtles, voiced again by Natasia Demetriou.

==== Slash ====
Slash is a humanoid turtle who is either an enemy or ally of the Ninja Turtles depending on the version.

In the Archie comics continuity, he is a turtle-like alien from a tropical planet in Dimension X. Slash's home world was destroyed by alien invaders, leaving him the only survivor. He was later found by Krang, who made a deal with him to find his way back to Earth, and in return, Slash came under the former's leadership and kept the Ninja Turtles busy while Krang sought to possess Shredder's body, but to no avail. Slash's rampage caught the attention of the Mighty Mutanimals, who captured him and brought him to their island. With Leatherhead's help, Slash was able to control his violent spree and informed that he would be allowed to stay in a grove of palm trees. Grateful, he went on to become a member of the Mutanimals, ultimately sacrificing himself to save the Turtles.

In the 1987 animated series, Slash (voiced by Pat Fraley) was Bebop's pet turtle, mutated by Rocksteady to carry out an assignment for Shredder. When Bebop accidentally drops the plastic palm tree in his tank down an air duct, Slash goes berserk and steals Shredder's shaolin, chasing them around the Technodrome before going to Earth on Bebop's part. There, he encounters a corrupt businessman who sends him to smash the Freedom Bell, which would tarnish the Turtles' reputation. The Turtles eventually stop them and sent Slash into space aboard a rocket, which unknowingly contained a plastic palm tree. Slash later returns to Earth, having had his intelligence enhanced by an extraterrestrial machine, but is foiled and returned to space.

In the IDW comics, Slash was introduced as Specimen 6, a snapping turtle experiment at StockGen mutated with Old Hob's DNA assigned to hunt down the Ninja Turtles and Splinter. However, his mind became unstable and gave him a savage nature, so Specimen 6 was contained in a special tank guarded by the Rock Soldiers. He was later freed due to April O'Neil's diversion to retrieve the Turtle Tracker for the Ninja Turtles. After punching one of the Rock Soldiers, he escaped from the lab. Though proven more powerful than the Turtles, Slash is accidentally impaled by Leonardo and left to fall into the sewers. He survives and is found by Old Hob, who tells him that they should work together to hunt down anyone with a connection to StockGen. Slash is shown the error of his ways when Michelangelo gives him a candy bar that he instantly fell in love with. He agrees to help the Turtles escape from one of Shredder's traps. Slash later injects himself with a syringe containing Splinter's compound-infused blood, declaring that he wanted to be a "hero" like Michelangelo. He gains increased intelligence and becomes the co-founder of Hob's new mutant army the Mutanimals.

In the 2012 animated series, Slash (voiced by Corey Feldman) was introduced as Spike, a young box turtle who was flushed into the sewers from his original owner's home and saved from drowning by Raphael, who took him in as his pet. He used to listen to his owner's angry ranting about his troubles with his family and learned ninjutsu by watching Raphael practice it in his room. Although no one knew at the time, Spike even developed a hatred for the Ninja Turtles, thanks to hearing Raphael's angry chants all his life. One night, he is mutated after drinking from a canister of mutagen that spilled in Raphael's room. Obtaining a mace, Slash joins the other Turtles on patrol but revealed his true intentions by beating Donatello and Michelangelo. Slash later allies with the Newtralizer, only to see the error of his actions and side with the Turtles and Casey Jones to stop him. He becomes the leader of the Mighty Mutanimals as they work with the Turtles to take back the city from the Krang.

Slash appears as a boss in the video games Teenage Mutant Ninja Turtles III: The Manhattan Project, the Super NES version of Teenage Mutant Ninja Turtles: Turtles in Time and Teenage Mutant Ninja Turtles: Shredder's Revenge.

Slash appears in Teenage Mutant Ninja Turtles: Mutants in Manhattan, voiced by Fred Tatasciore.

==== Pigeon Pete ====
Pigeon Pete is a mutant pigeon that appeared in the 2012 series and the IDW comics, both versions being a member of the Mighty Mutanimals.

In the 2012 series, Pigeon Pete is a pigeon that was mutated by the Kraang and is voiced by A.J. Buckley.

In Tales of the Teenage Mutant Ninja Turtles, Pigeon Pete was mutated by exposure to Michelangelo's blood and is voiced by Christopher Mintz-Plasse. He would later join the Mutanimals.

==== Merdude ====
Merdude is a merman-like creature.

In the Archie Comics, Alim was a boy who was born 5,000 years ago and was transformed into a merman-like form after being exposed to mutagen. Many years later, Merdude befriended the Teenage Mutant Ninja Turtles and became a reserve member of the Mighty Mutanimals.

Merdude appears in the 1987 Teenage Mutant Ninja Turtles episode "Atlantis Awakes", voiced by Kevin Schon. This version is Alim Coelacanth, the true ruler of Atlantis.

=== Mutagen Man ===
Mutagen Man is the name of several characters across the TMNT franchise.

In the 1987 animated series, Mutagen Man (voiced by Rob Paulsen) is Seymour Gutz, a nerdy mailman who was dismembered after falling into a vat of mutagen.

In the IDW comics, Mutagen Man is a failed attempt at combining several animals into one mutant. When the Mutanimals find him strapped to a bed, they try to free him. Although he is told that he is being saved, Mutagen Man has a different idea of the term by forcing Old Hob's gun to his dome and urging him to fire. Hob refuses and they all escape the facility together. Later, Mutagen Man is given the name "Seymour Guts" by Mondo Gecko.

In the 2012 animated series, Mutagen Man (voiced by Roger Craig Smith) is introduced as Timothy, a young ineffective ice cream vendor who, after witnessing the Turtles' first battle with Baxter Stockman from his apartment window, dedicated himself into fighting crime as a wannabe superhero in a turtle costume called the Pulverizer. After being exposed to mutagen, he transforms into a humanoid blob composed of mutagen with floating organs and a disintegrating touch. He is kept in a special mutagen container by Donatello, who promises to help him find a way to turn back to normal.

=== Ninjara ===
Ninjara's real name is Umeko, but for reasons that were never fully revealed she goes by the name "Ninjara". While Splinter first thought she was an "atomic child", she is actually part of an ancient race of humanoid foxes living on a hidden island off the coast of Japan. She ended up becoming a thief and assassin for the villainous dog-man Chien Kahn, but had a change of heart when she met the Turtles, and fell in love with Raphael. She helped out on many missions, from the Far and the Middle East to Dimension X. Her family life was explored more in detail when her younger brother managed to track her down and convince her to come back home.

=== Fugitoid ===
Professor Zayton Honeycutt (also spelled Honeycut) is a semi-retired scientist from the planet D'Hoonib whose mind was transferred into his working robot as both were struck by lightning. As he refused to build a transmat device (a means of teleportation) for General Blanque of the Federation military in their war against the Triceraton Republic, he was categorized as a "Fugitoid" (short for "fugitive android"). The character was introduced in a series of strips in the Gobbledygook comics that was later finished in a one-off self-titled comic book and then guest starred in the original TMNT issues 5 to 7, later became a recurring character in the main TMNT comic.

In the IDW comics, Honeycutt is a Neutrino scientist who used to work for Krang. Honeycutt's wife Marra worried about the influence of evil that was oppressing the Neutrinos, including their family. She convinced him that they should join the Neutrino resistance, and so they did. Three months later, Krang's armies found and attacked the resistance compound. Honeycutt used SAL to breach the flames and override the safety protocols, becoming trapped in SAL's body. He saved the compound's residents, only for them to be killed by army forces soon afterward. Not long after, Honeycutt escaped to Earth through a portal he had created after being attacked by Grantior. Now in New York City on Earth, Honeycutt masqueraded as a human to hide from the Rock Soldiers and took a job with Baxter Stockman at StockGen under the alias Chet Allen.

The Fugitoid appears in Teenage Mutant Ninja Turtles (2003), voiced by Oliver Wyman. His origin is identical to the Mirage continuity. Both the Triceratons and the Federation pursue him seeking to obtain his Teleportal device to gain the upper hand in their ongoing conflict, but Honeycutt found surprising allies in the Turtles. Honeycutt is eventually captured by the Federation, but sacrifices himself to infect their fleet with a computer virus that shuts them down. Honeycutt later returns, having uploaded a copy of his mind into Earth's satellite network prior to his destruction. Leatherhead builds him a new body using Earth technology.

The Fugitoid appears in the 2012 animated series, voiced by David Tennant. He first appears at the end of the third season aboard his vessel, the Ulixes, just in time to save the Turtles, April O'Neil, and Casey Jones from a black hole created by the Triceratons that destroys Earth. He turns back time six months, prior to Earth's destruction, and reveals that he was a scientist whose body was destroyed by the Triceratons after he rejected their offer to make weapons for them. His brain survived and was placed in the body of his robotic assistant, and he set out to stop the Triceratons from causing any more harm. It is later revealed that he created the black hole generator and sold it to the Kraang without knowing their intentions. Despite the distrust this prompts in the Turtles, April, and Casey, Fugitoid manages to recover the generator and execute his plan: combining his power source and that of his ship to destroy the generator while wiping out the Triceraton fleet. A past version of the Fugitoid takes the temporal duplicates of April, Casey, and the Turtles on an adventure; the present-day Honeycutt's head is shown to be intact and partially functional.

Fugitoid appears as a playable character in the Wii version of the 2009 fighting game Teenage Mutant Ninja Turtles: Smash-Up, voiced by Oliver Wyman. He also appears as an NPC in the videogames Teenage Mutant Ninja Turtles 2: Battle Nexus (2004) and Teenage Mutant Ninja Turtles 3: Mutant Nightmare (2005), as well as a cameo in the Dimension Shellshock DLC of the 2022 game Teenage Mutant Ninja Turtles: Shredder's Revenge.

== Supporting characters and allies ==
=== Tang Shen ===
Tang Shen appears in the Mirage comics as the lover of Splinter's owner Hamato Yoshi.

Tang Shen appears in the IDW comics as Hamato Yoshi's wife.

In the 2003 animated series, Tang Shen debuted in flashbacks in the Season 4 episode "Tale of Master Yoshi", voiced by Karen Neill. This flashback was told by Leonardo to Splinter and the other Turtles. In this version, Tang Shen had been an orphan raised by the Ancient One, in Tokyo, Japan, who eventually took in the orphaned Hamato Yoshi and his friend Yukio Mashimi as his own sons. As the years passed, she fell in love with Hamato Yoshi, and took in a hungry, innocent rat as a pet. As her bond with Yoshi strengthened, an even greater rift occurred in Yoshi's longtime friendship with Mashimi. Blinded by jealously and hatred, Yukio murdered Tang Shen.

In the 2012 animated series, Tang Shen (voiced by Minae Noji) had been the loving wife of Hamato Yoshi (who eventually mutated into the mutant-rat Splinter), and had borne a daughter whom they named Miwa. Her decision in choosing Hamato Yoshi over his adopted brother, Oroku Saki, had caused intense hatred to fester between them. Further taken over by vengeance, jealously and rage, Oroku Saki had staged an attack on Yoshi, attempting to finish him once and for all. However, Tang Shen intervened to defend her husband; a fatal decision, as the final blow meant for Yoshi had struck her instead.

=== Mr. O'Neil ===
There have been different versions of April's father in the TMNT franchise.

In the Mirage Comics, he is named Robert O'Neil. Not much is known of O'Neil, only that he is an antique dealer who owned his own shop, "Second Time Around", and a proficient businessman. One day his daughter Robyn was born, but his wife could no longer bear any children. In his examination of a few things that he purchased, but had not yet sorted, he had found a strange crystal, O'Neil attached the crystal to a pencil and was miraculously able to bring his drawings to life. O'Neil decided to satisfy his wife's desire to have children, but all of his attempts to create babies broke into nothing, as he had drawn them with a pencil. Sometime later O'Neil tried again with an ink pen, the result did not disappear this time and grew into a young woman: April.

Nearly thirty years later, O'Neil died of a serious illness and bequeathed his entire estate to his daughters, he gave April his old antique shop. All his life he had the secret of her origin concealed from April, until she had to learn through a chain of dramatic circumstances that she was not a naturally-born creature, and only some time later with Renet's help was she finally able to discover the truth. This realization gave April a severe emotional crisis, and she left her old life behind for a while to find a new meaning to her existence.

In the 2012 animated series, he is named Kirby O'Neil, voiced by Keith Silverstein. This version is a psychologist. He is mutated into a mutant bat in the second season and later cured with retro-mutagen in the third season.

In the IDW Comics, April's father is named John O'Neil. John experienced a stroke that left him unable to walk and reliant on his wife Elizabeth. Their daughter April considered abandoning her studies to help look after him, but her parents argued against it. Up until his stroke, John was employed as chief assistant at StockGen, the genetics laboratory of Baxter Stockman, which is responsible for the transformation of Splinter and the Turtles into mutants. He also knew of the Ooze, the base material for Stockman's experiments. It was through his initiative that April was able to secure her internship, through which she later became acquainted with the Turtles, but he and his wife already had a hunch that something in this laboratory was not right. Some time later, the Turtles were traced by agents of the Foot Clan to the O'Neil farm, while Elizabeth learned of the Turtles in a very dramatic way. After April and Splinter had declared her necessary, Elizabeth received from her daughter a vial of Ooze, which she used to heal her husband from the effects of his stroke. Then they returned to New York to be closer to their daughter, and reopened their antique shop.

In the 2014 film, April's father was referred to as Dr. O'Neil and was portrayed by Paul Fitzgerald. He was a scientist working at Sacks Groups Ltd as one of the creators of the TCRI mutagen. Splinter was the one who informed April that her father was killed by Eric Sacks and Shredder destroying their lab.

=== Mrs. O'Neil ===
There have been different versions of Mrs. O'Neil in the TMNT franchise.

In the Mirage Comics, she was named Bridget O'Neil.

In the 2012 animated series, Mrs. O'Neil (voiced by Renae Jacobs) was the loving wife of the psychologist Kirby O'Neil, and the late mother of sixteen-year-old April O'Neil. Many decades ago, when she was a child, her grandfather had discovered the Kraang residing deep underneath the O'Neil's family farmhouse. After he unmistakably awakened the Kraang, they performed experiments on him and his entire bloodline; including Mrs. O'Neil. In her adult years she had fall in love with and married an Irish scientist by the name of Kirby O'Neil. She was eventually captured and experimented on by the Kraang while she was pregnant with April. As a result, her daughter was born a human/Kraang hybrid mutant; possessing an array of psychic abilities. When April was six years old, her mother was captured by the Kraang and "put into stasis". One decade later, the Kraang create a clone of O'Neil who possesses her memories and is infused with Kraang DNA. April is uncertain if her real mother is dead or still alive somewhere.

In the IDW Comics, April's mother was named Elizabeth O'Neil, who was a journalist (similar to April's status as a reporter from various TMNT media adaptations). Elizabeth was first introduced when April, the Turtles, Casey, and Splinter were forced to flee New York to their home in Northampton. While April and Casey worked on keeping the Turtles and Splinter a secret, Elizabeth showed having some knowledge of the mutagen due to her past career as a reporter. When the Foot Clan tracked them down and attacked Elizabeth along with her husband John found out about the existence of the Turtles and Splinter. After the group fled, Elizabeth used a part of the mutagen April left behind to help heal John from his stroke due to its healing properties. Afterwards, the two moved to New York and took up residence in the Second Time Around store, where they maintain a good relationship with their daughter and her other friends, where they also allowed Casey to stay with them due to issues he has with his father.

=== Justice Force ===
The Justice Force is a superhero team that was around during the Golden Age.

First appearing in the Mirage Comics issue "Dome Doom", the Turtles and Casey meet the older versions of the Justice Force in Northampton at the time when their former member Doctor Dome attacked them with his Domeoids. The fight ended when Battlin' Bernice's daughter named Ananda showed up to chastise Doctor Dome for ruining her mother's life. Stainless Steel Steve broke up the argument and offered Doctor Dome a redemption which he took. When Lilith swore vengeance on Shadow Jones for the death of Sloan, April and Casey asked Stainless Steel Steve and Metal Head to help Splinter watch over their stepdaughter.

In the 2003 TV series, the Justice Force first appears in the episode "Return of the Justice Force". The Turtles and Casey head to Northampton where they enter Steve's comic book store to look for a lost issue that would have helped Michelangelo know the fate of Battlin' Bernice. They meet the Justice Force when Doctor Dome started using his Domeoids to abduct them. It was soon discovered that Doctor Dome's secret daughter with Battlin' Bernice named Ananda was behind this where she wanted revenge on the Justice Force for letting her mother die. When Ananda was defeated, Doctor Dome reconciled with his daughter and also reconciled with Stainless Steve Steel. In later episodes, Ananda and Metal Head formed a second incarnation of the Justice Force that consisted of Silver Sentry, Chryalis, and Tsunami with Stainless Steel Steve in an advisor role and Zippy Lad training the new recruits. Their membership was later expanded with Nobody, Raptarr, and Nano in the episode "Membership Drive" while also gaining Michelangelo as the Turtle Titan. The Justice Force are among the allies of the Turtles who assist them in the fight against the Demon Shredder's forces. The episode "Super Power Struggle" revealed another former member called the Green Mantle who lost his powered cape in a battle and was found by Raphael during the fight with Dr. Malignus. When Dr. Malignus was defeated, the security guard at the convention turned out to be Green Mantle's true identity of Al Gordon who reclaims the special cape and rejoins the Justice Force.

==== Stainless Steel Steve ====
Stainless Steel Steve is the leader of the Justice Force who gets his name from the round metallic saucer on his head, which can smash through anything.

In Mirage Comics, Stainless Steel Steve and Doctor Dome competed for the love of Battlin' Bernice. In the present, Steve runs a comic book store with Metal Head as the stock boy when Doctor Dome began to target his old teammates. When Ananda came into view and broke up the fight, Steve offered Doctor Dome a chance at redemption.

Stainless Steel Steve appears in the 2003 animated series voiced by David Wills impersonating Adam West. During the Justice Force's fight with Doctor Dome, Michelangelo mentioned that Steve once saved Doctor Dome from the Living Volcano and Doctor Dome once cured Steve of the creeping alien rust. When Ananda was defeated and had reconciled with Doctor Dome, Steve thanked the Turtles and Casey Jones for their help and even made Michelangelo an honorary member of the Justice Force. In "Super Power Struggle", Steve appeared in an advisor role to the second incarnation of the Justice Force at the time when Raphael found the Green Mantle's powered cape. Following Dr. Malignus' defeat, Steve picked up Al Gordon from the hospital and reunited with the Justice Force while reclaiming his cape.

==== Metal Head ====
Metal Head is a synthetic and dwarfish member of the Justice Force who can harden his hair to be used for weapons and change the physiology of his form. When Stainless Steel Steve opened his comic book store, Metal Head worked as the stock boy.

Metal Head appears in the 2003 animated series, voiced by Wayne Grayson.

==== Joey Lastic ====
Joey Lastic is an elastic member of the Justice Force.

Joey Lastic appears in the 2003 animated series, voiced by Oliver Wyman. In his old age, he has been shown to have trouble retracting his limbs and neck.

==== Zippy Lad ====
Zippy Lad is a member of the Justice Force who possesses superhuman speed. In his old age, he can still move fast in his electronic wheelchair.

Zippy Lad appears in the 2003 animated series, voiced by Andrew Rannells in his first two appearances and by Sean Schemmel in his third appearance.

==== Doctor Dome ====
Doctor Dome is a dome-headed member of the Justice Force with genius-level intellect who can control his robots called Domeoids.

In Mirage Comics, he and Stainless Steel Steve competed for the love of Battlin' Bernice. When the Justice Force disbanded, Doctor Dome had a falling out with them. Years later, Doctor Dome started targeting the Justice Foce members to draw out Battlin' Bernice which also brought him into conflict with the Turtles and Casey Jones. When Battlin' Bernice's daughter Ananda shows up to break up the fight, she chasitizes him. Steve offered Doctor Dome a chance at redemption which he accepted.

Doctor Dome appears in the 2003 animated series, voiced by Stuart Zagnit.

==== Ananda ====
Ananda is the daughter of Battlin' Bernice who inherited her mother's superhuman strength.

In Mirage Comics, Ananda shows up to interrupt the fight between Doctor Dome, the Justice Force, the Turtles, and Casey Jones where she chasitizes Doctor Dome.

Ananda appears in the 2003 animated series, voiced by Amy Birnbaum in most appearances and by Veronica Taylor in "The Journal". This version is the daughter of Battlin' Bernice and Doctor Dome, inheriting the latter's powers. In later episodes, Ananda and Metal Head formed a second incarnation of the Justice Force.

=== Pantheon ===
The Pantheon is a group of demigods from the Mirage comics who first introduced in the Tales of the Teenage Mutant Ninja Turtles issue Vol.2 #35. They are beings dedicated to the welfare of Earth's animals. The Rat King was counted among their number, but was later expelled after he abused his power to bring Splinter under his control. The unnamed members of the Pantheon planned to bring Splinter in as Rat King's replacement.

The Pantheon also appears in the IDW comics, this time as a group of immortals who have interfered with humanity's development in the ancient past. Some of them, scheming as ever, even try to do so again in the present, bringing them into conflict with the Turtles.

The Pantheon also makes an appearance in IDW's Saturday Morning Adventures spinoff as an intergalactic crime syndicate.

==== Aka ====
Aka is the oldest sibling of the Pantheon in the IDW comics.

==== Gothano ====
Gothano is a member of the Pantheon and is more quite than his siblings and is the keeper of knowledge.

IDW's Saturday Morning Adventures spin-off depicts a gender-swapped version of Gothano called Golgotha.

==== Toad Baron ====
Toad Baron is a member of the Pantheon who wants to make parties for both mortals and immortals to enjoy.

=== Al'Falqa ===
Al'Falqa is a mutant falcon from an unnamed city in Saudi Arabia who is exclusive to the Teenage Mutant Ninja Turtles Adventures comics. Al'Falqa encounters the Turtles when they were traveling in Saudi Arabia. They helped Al'Falqa protect the mysterious Black Stone, which was about to be stolen by Shredder and Verminator-X.

=== Punk Frogs ===
The Punk Frogs are a group of mutant frogs who are the counterparts of the Ninja Turtles.

In the 1987 series, the Punk Frogs are created by Shredder when mutagen landed in their swamp. Shredder convinced them that he was a good guy and to be his warriors, naming them after would-be conquerors and dictators. Shredder trained them to fight the Turtles, whom he had convinced the frogs into believing were evil. Each of the frogs were named after Shredder's own "heroes". After the Turtles saved them from being captured by Captain Hoffman, they realized that the Turtles were good guys and that Shredder was a bad guy and broke ties with him. Afterward, the frogs became friends with the Turtles, with Attila emerging as the group's leader.

In Ninja Turtles: Superman Legend the Punk Frogs (except Napoleon Bonafrog) make a cameo.

In the 2012 series, the Punk Frogs were created by mutagen poured into their pond near the O'Neil family farmhouse by Mrs. O'Neil's Krang clone. Besides Attila, Genghis, Napoleon, and Rasputin, there are a substantial number of Frog Soldiers working for them. Evidently remembering the actions of humans in destroying their swamps to make room for cities, they swore revenge upon them, and briefly considered the Turtles brothers in need of liberation until learning that they were friends with April and Casey. Afterwards, the Punk Frogs.

In the comic series published by IDW, the Punk Frogs are a faction in Mutant Town. Besides Atilla, Genghis, Napoleon, and Rasputin, there are other members of the group consisting of Bloody Mary, Bonnie, Clyde, and Zetian.

The Punk Frogs appear as cameos in the 2022 beat-'em-up Teenage Mutant Ninja Turtles: Shredder's Revenge.

==== Attila the Frog ====
Atilla the Frog is a member of the Punk Frogs. He is named after Attila the Hun. He is armed with a spike ball and chain.

In Mutant Turtles: Superman Legend, Attila makes a cameo.

In the 2012 animated series, Attila the Frog (voiced by Maurice LaMarche) is the leader of the group. Much of his behavior was inspired after actor Marlon Brando, and inspired by his characters in The Godfather and Apocalypse Now.

In the IDW comics, Attila is the tall leader of the Punk Frogs, wields a morningstar, and is very protective of the group.

==== Genghis Frog ====
Genghis Frog is a member of the Punk Frogs. He is named after Genghis Khan.

In the 1987 animated series, Genghis Frog (voiced by Jim Cummings) is a Punk Frog that is armed with an axe.

In Mutant Turtles: Superman Legend, Genghis makes a cameo.

In the 2012 animated series, Genghis Frog (voiced by Kevin Michael Richardson) served as the General of the Frog Soldiers.

In the IDW comics, Genghis Frog is a tall member of the Punk Frogs with a fierce personality and wields an axe.

In Teenage Mutant Ninja Turtles: Mutant Mayhem, Genghis Frog is voiced by Hannibal Buress. He is a member of Superfly's gang. Genghis Frog eventually joins the other gang members in switching to the Turtle's side and becoming part of their extended family.

Genghis Frog appears in Tales of the Teenage Mutant Ninja Turtles, voiced by Amad Jackson while his croaking sounds were provided by Fred Tatasciore.

Genghis Frog appears in Teenage Mutant Ninja Turtles: Mutants Unleashed, voiced again by Amad Jackson.

==== Napoleon Bonafrog ====
Napoleon Bonafrog is a member of the Punk Frogs. He is named after Napoleon Bonaparte.

In the 1987 animated series, Napoleon Bonafrog (voiced by Pat Fraley in most appearances, Townsend Coleman in "Napoleon Bonafrog: Colossus of the Swamps") is a Punk Frog who wields a whip. Though normally the Turtles ally, he was once transformed into a hulking slave of Krang and Shredder.

In the 2012 animated series, Napoleon Bonafrog (voiced by Jon Heder) is depicted as a clumsy frog disliked by his brethren, which leads to his befriending Michelangelo. Much of his behavior was a nod to Heder's character in Napoleon Dynamite.

In the IDW comics, Napoleon is a tall and well-built member of the Punk Frogs and wields a whip.

==== Rasputin the Mad Frog ====
Rasputin the Mad Frog is a member of the Punk Frogs. He is named after Grigori Rasputin.

In the 1987 animated series, Rasputin (voiced by Nicholas Omana) is a Punk Frog who wields a bow and arrow.

In Mutant Turtles: Superman Legend, Rasputin makes a brief cameo.

In the 2012 animated series, Rasputin (voiced by Maurice LaMarche) is the adviser to Attila the Frog.

In the IDW comics, Rasputin is a bulky member of the Punk Frogs with a reasonable personality and wields a crossbow.

=== Renet Tilley ===
Renet Tilley is a rather reluctant, spoiled, and impulsive teenager whose parents, also denizens of the 79th Level, hoped that apprenticing her to Lord Simultaneous would help her develop some kind of common sense. Curious and impatient as she was, she did not care very much for studying. Renet first met the Turtles fooling around, when one day out of boredom she snatched her master's Time Scepter and was caught by him. She replied immediately and time-traveled off with Lord Simultaneous' Sceptre of the Sands of Time to Earth – more specifically to 1986 New York City. Renet and the Turtles became friends, but Simultaneous appeared and sent Renet into a panic. Fleeing Simultaneous further, she and the Turtles went to 1406 A.D., straight into a castle siege. The castle belonged to the dark mage Savanti Romero, a former, but exiled student of Simultaneous, and the besiegers were the soldiers of Cerebus, who was after some scrolls, that Romero had stolen. Romero also managed to grab the Time Scepter, and the Turtles and Renet had to contend with Cerebus' help to attack the castle and get the Sceptre back from Savanti Romero. The force was no match for Romero's magic. Before it came to the worst, Simultaneous appeared. Romero attacked Lord Simultaneous who took the Time Scepter again and cast Savanti into prehistoric times. He handed the scrolls to Cerebus, sent the Turtles back again to their time, and sent Renet to wipe dust in his huge library. Later, she assists the Turtles in defeating Savanti Romero in prehistory when Romero plans to alter the Earths orbit and prevent the asteroid impact that wiped out the dinosaurs, meaning humanity, and mutant Turtles, will never exist. After defeating Romero, the group is stranded in prehistory for several months after the Scepter is lost in the ocean, but it is eventually recovered. Renet makes a third appearance saving the Turtles from Romero's demonic bride, Juliet Romero. This time she appears as a deity-like woman with full control over her time manipulating powers.

In the 2003 animated series, Renet (voiced by Liza Jacqueline) undergone some minor changes in her backstory, where she is shown to be quite a scatterbrained person who came to her friends with good intentions, but with little practical skill she caused some problems across space and time. This leads to her transporting herself and the Turtles back to the medieval age to which Savanti Romero was banished, which resulted in the loss of the Time Scepter to Ultimate Drako, the fused form of the Ultimate Ninja and Drako. It would later be recovered and entrusted to Renet again, leading to another encounter with Romero in the Cretaceous Period. She would later appear at April and Casey's wedding, watching from a distance.

In the IDW comics, Renet has her debut in a special story, where she "invites" the Turtles to the interdimensional Battle Nexus tournament. In this version she is Lord Simultaneous' pupil in magic, dimension travel, and apparently his successor in the Dimensional Council.

In the 2012 animated series, Renet (voiced by Ashley Johnson) is a young immature timestress from the future who, like Michelangelo, makes rash decisions that sometimes gets her and others into trouble. She is also becomes the object of Michelangelo's affections

=== Muckman ===
Muckman is a mutant in Teenage Mutant Mutant Ninja Turtles.

In the 1980s TV series, Muckman was voiced by Townsend Coleman impersonating Jackie Gleason. Garson Grunge is a waste collector who was mutated into a humanoid mutant made of garbage.

In the 2012 TV series, Muckman was voiced by Nolan North in the first appearance and by Grant Moninger starting in "The Noxious Avenger". In the earlier episodes, Garson Grunge appears as a sewer worker. In "The Noxious Avenger", Grunge is working as a waste collector and is accidentally mutated during the Turtles' fight with Bebop and Rocksteady after falling into a dumpster. Unlike the previous Muckman, this version has power over all types of garbage.

An original incarnation of Muckman appears in Tales of the Teenage Mutant Ninja Turtles. This version is Rod Underwood Sr. (voiced by Fred Tatasciore), the multi-millionaire head of a company and benefactor of Bishop Robotics who is the father of Rod Jr., Maude, and Todd. After Rod Jr. was later rescued, Underwood is mutated into a green slime monster after drinking a combination of mutagen extracted from Leatherhead's scales and fake mutant blood made from lime soda and the "muck" that was found in the garbage disposal. The Turtles and Rod Jr. overload Muckman with a mixture of the muck, soda, algae, and kombucha. His remains are placed in a jar that Rod Jr. takes into his possession with a warning against drinking it.

==== Joe Eyeball ====
Joe Eyeball is a mutant in Teenage Mutant Ninja Turtles.

In the 1980s TV series, Joe Junkee is Garson Grunge's fellow waste collector and was mutated into a small slug-headed mutant.

In the 2012 TV series, Joe Eyeball (voiced by Grant Moninger) is Muckman's left eye who gained sentience following his mutation and acts as his voice of reason.

=== Tattoo ===
Tattoo is a sumo wrestler whose tattoos can be used as weapons.

In the Teenage Mutant Ninja Turtles episode "Planet of the Turtleloids", Tattoo (voiced by Rob Paulsen) was a hamster mutated by Shredder into human form. The Ninja Turtles encounter him vandalizing a pet shop. After a scuffle in which a confused angered Tattoo wraps himself up in electrical wire, he is electrocuted and reverted to his normal form.

In the Archie Comics, he asked Splinter for a favor and requested that the TMNT rescue his chihuahua dog "Inky" from a group of Yakuza who wanted him to throw his next fight for gambling purposes. Tattoo states that he can't lose the match as it will ruin his career. The TMNT vow to help him get his pooch back without having to throw the match. While Tattoo is engaged in his Sumo match, the TMNT, Ninjara and the Warrior Dragon infiltrate the mob headquarters and rescue the feisty pup. Tattoo wins his match and the Turtles return Inky to his beloved master. The wrestler awards Leonardo a katana as thanks for saving his dog.

=== Manmoth ===
Manmoth is a mammoth-like creature.

In the Archie Comics, Manmoth was the result of Shredder having Rocksteady and Bebop use mutagen on a block of ice containing a caveman that was salvaged from a shipwreck. as seen in TMNT Meets Archie #1. Because the caveman's outfit was made out of woolly mammoth fur, the caveman mutated into a 20 ft. mutant woolly mammoth. Though the Turtles get through to Manmoth, Rocksteady and Bebop knock it into the frozen harbor. In Teenage Mutant Ninja Turtles #41, Manmoth is revealed to have survived by swimming to safety and managed to learn some English. Seeing a truck carrying dinosaurs, Manmoth follows it to the museum and is captured by Dr. Selena Davis, Wayne, and Robert. Davis creates a clone of Manmoth, which the original Manmoth defeats. April O'Neil arranges for Manmoth to be transported to the Arctic Circle.

In IDW Publishing, Manmoth is a mammoth-like god with a broken tusk and a member of the Pantheon.

In the ongoing IDW Publishing comic series Teenage Mutant Ninja Turtles: Saturday Morning Adventures which is in the same continuity as the 80s series, Manmoth is a woolly mammoth god with African elephant-like ears and a wrestler outfit. He is a member of the Pantheon and a champion of the Battle Nexus.

=== Monty Moose ===
Monty Moose is a mutant moose.

In the toyline associated with the 80s TV series, Monty was a normal moose who was mutated after falling into Shredder's mutagen stash called Lake Ooze. He sported a mounty outfit and allied with the Ninja Turtles.

In IDW Publishing, Monty started out as a human before being mutated by Old Hob's Mutagen Bomb. Constable Raphael made Monty his deputy in keeping the peace in Mutant Town. After the Mutant Town quarantine is ended, Monty joins the human-mutant task force.

=== The Warrior Dragon ===
The Warrior Dragon debuted in the Fall 1990 issue of Teenage Mutant Ninja Turtles Magazine. He later returned in the Teenage Mutant Ninja Turtles Adventures comics series published by Archie Comics in 1991 as a New York City fireman named Chu Hsi. He was created by Mirage Studios artist Ryan Brown.

In 1992 Playmates Toys released an action figure of the Warrior Dragon named Hothead and cast in red plastic. Using the Hothead name, the character appeared in the NES version of Teenage Mutant Ninja Turtles: Tournament Fighters.

=== Angel ===
Angel is a supporting character who first appeared in the 2003 animated series, voiced by Tara Sands. She was seen as an initiate of the Purple Dragons until Casey Jones talked her into leaving them.

Angel appears in the IDW comics under the name Angel Bridge, serving as an acting leader of the Purple Dragons until Hun returns. Angel later becomes the vigilante Nobody, using an exo-suit created by the Turtles' ally Harold Lillja.

In the third volume of the Mirage Comics series, there is a female ninja named Angel who is one of Pimiko's minions.

Angel appears in Tales of the Teenage Mutant Ninja Turtles, voiced by Jamila Velazquez. Angel is a member of the Purple Dragons and a close friend of Hun, with both working for the crime boss Kitsune.

=== Utroms ===
The Utroms are a race of brain-like aliens in the franchise. They first appeared in the Mirage comics and later in the IDW comics. They also appear in the 2003 television series as allies for the Turtles to stop a rogue Utrom named Ch'rell, the modern Shredder led by one named Mortu (voiced by Dan Green). Appointed by the Utrom Council, Mortu was the captain of an Utrom ship that crashed on Earth a thousand years ago in Japan. After the crash, he remained the field-leader of the marooned Utroms, and worked as their liaison to the Humans. In the modern day, this makes him CEO of the front company TCRI. His name is "Utrom" backwards.

In the 2012 series, the Utroms hail from Dimension X and the notable members are Bishop, Pawn, Rook and Queen.

In the series Rise of the Teenage Mutant Ninja Turtles, one rogue member was revealed to be the creator of the armor worn by Shredder, which many believed to be an Oni.

=== Alopex ===
Alopex is a mutant arctic fox who debuted in the IDW comics. Originally a normal arctic fox in Alaska, she was captured by scientists and taken away from her family to be experimented on with mutagen, granting her human-like intelligence and altering her body. She was rescued from the laboratory by Shredder and recruited into the Foot Clan, whom she loyally served for years. In her first appearance in Teenage Mutant Ninja Turtles: Micro-Series, she attempts to trick Raphael into bringing her to their lair, but he manages to catch onto her scheme.

Shredder later tested her commitment to the Foot by burning down the forest she grew up in. While she continued serving him, she vowed to kill him one day. She ultimately defects to the Turtles' side when they fought Shredder to reclaim a brainwashed Leonardo from him. While their relationship with her is tense at first after she follows them to April's parents' farm, she ultimately gains their trust thanks to Leonardo vouching for her and bonds with Raphael. After Splinter kills Shredder and takes over the Foot Clan, she helps train the new recruits and forms a close friendship with Angel aka Nobody.

However, she is brainwashed by Kitsune into an assassination attempt on Splinter. Though it is successfully prevented, she runs back to Alaska to fight of Kitsune's influence, and with help from Raphael and Angel, she's able to rid herself of it completely. She returns home and begins dating Raphael while helping the Turtles monitor Mutant Town as part of the Splinter Clan (even getting her own green mask in the process), but she later separates from them when they decide to work together with Shredder to prepare for the Rat King's Armageddon Game and adopts Old Hob's mutated weasels to form the Claw Clan.

Alopex appears in the 2012 series voiced by Minae Noji. This version is a mutant red fox who possesses superhuman speed and the sister of recurring series villain Tiger Claw. When she and her brother were children in Japan, they wandered into a portal on a playground and ended up getting captured by the Kraang, who mutated and experimented on them for months. When they eventually escaped, they ran away from home knowing the rest of their village would see them as monsters, joining a circus and later becoming top-level assassins. Alopex developed a vendetta against her brother for forcing her into a life of crime and murdering their parents and rebelled against him, cutting off his tail in the process. In "Tale of Tiger Claw", she comes to New York to finish her brother off and steals the Cursed Blades of Vengeance to do so, accidentally cursing Casey Jones in the process. With the help of the Turtles, she is able to defeat her brother, but refrains from killing him after listening to Leonardo's warnings of how vengeance could impact her life. When Tiger Claw attempts to shoot her as she begins to walk away, she cuts off his arm in retaliation before disappearing.

=== Old Hob ===
Old Hob, or just Hob, is a male mutant alley cat in the IDW comics. He was mutated right after the Turtles and Splinter, still animals at that time, had been stolen by Foot ninjas from the StockGen laboratories. He tried to abduct Raphael as his dinner, only to have his right eye clawed out by Splinter. Transformed by mutagen residue sticking to the Turtles and Splinter, he at first worked as Stockman's henchman until the latter betrayed him. Embittered by his experiences with humans, he became a terrorist for mutantkind and formed his own version of the Mutanimals, later going so far as to transform a large portion of New Yorkers into mutants using a mutagen bomb. At first antagonistic towards the Turtles, he gradually develops a mutual understanding with them and lends them his assistance when asked.

In the Saturday Morning Adventures spinoff series, Hob also appears as the leader of The Pantheon.

=== Lita ===
Lita is a pre-adolescent female mutant albino turtle featured in the IDW comics. Originally a human albino child, she fell victim to Hob's mutagen bomb with which he turned a huge number of New York citizens into mutants, and was subsequently abandoned by her parents. She lived on the streets in the newly formed ghetto of Mutant Town until she was taken in by the Turtles. She and her new family also encounter a future version of herself, named Big Lita, an apprentice to Time Mistress Renet. In the course of events in which Donatello tries to avert the menace posed by the time-traveling devourer Armaggon, she is turned back into her human form by Bob, Leonardo's student-turned-villain from the future.

=== Metalhead ===
Metalhead is a robotic Turtle that usually has some link with Donatello, either having been designed by him, or reprogrammed by him.

=== Klunk ===
Klunk is a stray ally cat Michaelango adopted. He has appeared in the Mirage comics, the 2003 animated series, and the IDW comics.

=== Cudley the Transdimensional Cowlick ===
Cudley the Transdimensional Cowlick is a giant cow head with the ability to teleport and is an ally of the turtles. Cudley appeared in the Archie comics and, later, the IDW comics.

== Villains ==
=== Foot Clan ===
The Foot Clan is an evil ninja organization that is usually run by Shredder.

==== Shredder ====
Shredder is the leader of the Foot Clan and arch-enemy of the Ninja Turtles.

==== Karai ====
Karai is usually depicted as a high-ranking member of the Foot Clan. Introduced in Mirage comics in 1992, Karai is in charge of the Foot Clan in its native Japan. In adaptations she has been usually depicted as Shredder's second-in-command or adopted daughter. She shares a rivalry with Leonardo and is at times considered his love interest. In the IDW comics continuity, she is the granddaughter of Shredder, while in the 2012 series, she is Hamato Miwa, the only child of Hamato Yoshi / Splinter and Tang Shen. The 2012 version of Karai later became a mutant horned viper, but is able to revert to her human form at will due to Baxter Stockman accidentally adding an extra ingredient to the mutagen.

Karai also appears in at least three stand-alone stories in the non-canon series Tales of the Teenage Mutant Ninja Turtles, as well as in the comic book adaptation of the 2007 animated film. According to Complex, "since her comic book debut, Karai has become an extremely popular character, serving as the sometimes villain, sometimes uneasy ally of our fearsome foursome."

==== Foot Elites ====
The Foot Elites are the elite squads of Shredder in the Mirage and IDW comics. The Foot Elite also appears in the 2003 animated series voiced by Ted Lewis.

==== Foot Mystics ====
The Foot Mystics are Foot Ninjas that mastered the art of magic. They first appeared in the 2003 animated series and later appeared in the Mirage series.

In the 2012 animated series, Karai's friend Shinigami (voiced by Gwendoline Yeo) is a Foot Mystic.

==== Bebop and Rocksteady ====
Bebop and Rocksteady are a mutant warthog and rhinoceros employed by Shredder and enemies of the Ninja Turtles.

==== Tatsu ====
Tatsu is a Foot Clan Warrior and Shredder's second-in-command in Teenage Mutant Ninja Turtles, Teenage Mutant Ninja Turtles II: The Secret of the Ooze, and the 2012 animated series.

In the films, Tatsu (portrayed by Toshishiro Obata and voiced by Michael McConnohie) is a skilled martial artist who oversees the training of Shredder's army. He rarely speaks except to Shredder or to give orders to the Foot Ninja or those training to join the ranks. He leads the attack on April O'Neil's home in the first film, and later fights with Casey Jones at the Foot lair. Though initially overpowering the vigilante, he is defeated after Casey finds a golf club among the various stolen items stockpiled by the Foot and uses it to subdue Tatsu. In the second film, he is shown to have escaped police custody and attempts to take leadership of the Foot until Shredder is revealed to be still alive. He leads the Foot Ninja who steal the mutagen from TGRI and helps oversee the rebuilding of the Foot army. However, he is easily defeated near the end of the film by the Turtles all slamming their back shells into him.

In the 2012 animated series, Hattori Tatsu (voiced by Michael Hagiwara) is a blind swordsman, but still Shredder's loyal underling. Here, he was in charge of the Foot Clan in Japan whenever Shredder was absent, and also mentored Karai. After the death of the Super Shredder, Tatsu came to New York to seize control of the remainder of the Foot Clan from Tiger Claw only to face the Turtles and Karai and be opposed by Tiger Claw. His soul is drained from him by Kavaxas.

Tatsu appears as a boss in Teenage Mutant Ninja Turtles: The Hyperstone Heist.

==== Tokka and Rahzar ====
Tokka and Rahzar are a mutant alligator snapping turtle and gray wolf employed by Shredder and enemies of the Ninja Turtles.

Tokka and Rahzar first appear in Teenage Mutant Ninja Turtles II: The Secret of the Ooze with Tokka performed by Rick Lyon (facial puppetry) and Kurt Bryant (suit), Rahzar performed by Gord Robertson (facial puppetry) and Mark Ginther (suit), and both voiced by Frank Welker. As a snapping turtle and gray wolf abducted from the Bronx Zoo by the Foot Clan, Tokka and Rahzar were mutated into humanoid forms by kidnapped TCRI professor Jordan Perry under Shredder's orders, but during the process, Perry secretly altered the mutagen with the DNA of human infants. This eventually gave the duo childish personalities, thus humiliating Shredder by thinking the word "master" meant "mama". However, Perry had sympathy for them and showed Shredder their full obedience, thus convincing to keep them around. The duo even proved to be more than a match for the Ninja Turtles. After failing to stop them from rescuing Perry, Shredder had them cause destruction to an old neighborhood. The next day, Shredder had the Foot encounter April and have her deliver the Turtles a message telling them to meet the Foot Clan at a construction site near the docks or else Tokka and Rahzar will be sent out again. This time, they will be sent into Central Park. The Turtles note that Tokka and Rahzar won't avoid any people there. Perry had prepared a retro-mutagen for the Turtles to use, which retro-mutated both Tokka and Rahzar after a brief battle during a Vanilla Ice concert. The fate that followed the duo's retro-mutation remained unknown, but it's most likely that they could've been carted back to the zoo.

In the 1987 animated series, Tokka (voiced by Rob Paulsen) and Rahzar (voiced by Townsend Coleman) were out-of-control alligator snapping turtle and gray wolf zoo exhibits mutated into their current mutant forms when Shredder infected their habitats. Following their first encounter with the Ninja Turtles at the Crystal Palace Mall, Tokka was captured by a mutant hunter and taken to Dirk Savage, leaving Rahzar to report back to Shredder. Rahzar made a big deal with Tokka's capture and went to fight Dirk alone, yet it was unclear of whether or not the duo was reunited following the rescue mission.

In the series finale of the 2003 animated series titled "Turtles Forever", two Cyber Foot members are mutated into the 2003 incarnations of the characters and play a brief role as members of the Mutant Foot Soldiers.

In the 2012 animated series, Tokka (vocal effects provided by different sound effects) and Rahzar (voiced by Clancy Brown) are given drastically different origins. As a result, they were never seen together in this series.

Rahzar is introduced first as Chris Bradford, a celebrity martial arts star who is a prized pupil of Shredder, owning chain of dojos across the country with their ninjutsu classes used for the purpose of recruiting Foot Ninjas. When Shredder learned of Splinter's presence in New York, he sent by Bradford to find and kill both him and the Ninja Turtles, first tricking Michelangelo into a faux friendship on a social media website. Bradford revealed his deception when he had Michelangelo captured, sparking a bitter hatred from him. However, after he failed to trick the Turtles into leading him and the Foot to Splinter and numerous repeated failures, Shredder became enraged at his incompetence. During a fight with the Turtles, Bradford and Xever were doused with mutagen, and as a result of being earlier bitten in the knuckles by Shredder's pet akita, Hatchiko, Bradford mutated into a mutant akita dubbed Dogpound. Bradford is later mutated into a near-skeletal werewolf-like form after falling into a mutagen vat. Being given the new name Rahzar by Michelangelo, he continues to serve Shredder until his death at the hands of Leatherhead towards the end of the fourth season. Rahzar was resurrected by the demon Kavaxas in the fifth season, only to be revealed to be serving as Kavaxas's puppet. Rahzar falls into the Netherworld during Kavaxas's attack on the mortal realm.
Tokka, on the other hand, is introduced as Tokka Picasso, a monstrous female turtle-like alien assigned by the Utroms to guard the final piece of the black hole generator. In her first appearance, she attempts to recover the black hole generator piece from when Lord Dregg was able to steal it. However, the piece was seemingly destroyed by the explosion of a dwarf star triggered by the Triceratons, though Tokka's son Chompy survived and remained with the Turtles. Tokka is revealed to have survived the ordeal and ventures to Earth to retrieve her son, but allows him to stay with Raphael after realizing he is in good hands with him. Tokka departed Earth, though Raphael conceded that Chompy would eventually have to return to his mother. She alludes more to Terrorpin, the basis of her character.

In the comic series published by IDW, Tokka and Rahzar appear as two of Old Hob's mutant creations. He was to sell them as "recruits" to Karai and the Foot Clan.

In Tales of the Teenage Mutant Ninja Turtles, Tokka and Rahzar (voiced by Peter Stormare and Ralph Ineson) are a snapping turtle and a wolf who are the mass-produced creations of mad scientist Dr. Jordan Perry. Because of Perry's unstable mutagen, the Mutanimals periodically revert to their original forms, resulting in Perry cloning them and passing their personalities into the next batch. Two of the Tokka and Rahzar clones assist the Turtles and lead the remainder of Perry's Mutanimals in sacrificing themselves to stop Mutant Omega.

==== Chrome Dome ====
Chrome Dome is a robotic member of the Foot Clan.

Chrome Dome first appeared in the 1987 animated series voiced by Peter Renaday. He first appears in the episode "Planet of the Turtleoids", in which he is built by Shredder to supervise the Foot Soldiers in the construction of the Technodrome Mark-II. He is destroyed by the Turtles by disabling a main chip on his back. He returns in the episode "Night of the Rogues", only to be destroyed by Casey Jones.

A series of Chrome Dome robots appear in the 2012 series, voiced by Nolan North. They are modeled after Chris Bradford's dark ninja outfit.

Chrome Dome appears in Teenage Mutant Ninja Turtles: Chrome Alone 2 – Lost in New Jersey, voiced by Zach Woods. This version is a benevolent A.I.

==== Pizzaface ====
Pizzaface (sometimes spelled Pizza Face) is a villain associated with pizza.

In the toyline associated with the 1980s TV series, Pizzaface is Shredder's personal pizza chef. When he used a retro-mutagen oven to enhance himself, the Ninja Turtles pulled him out of it. This gives Pizzaface the ability to manipulate anything pizza-related.

In the 2012 TV series, Pizza Face started out as a pizza chef named Antonio (voiced by John DiMaggio). When a canister of mutagen fell near his restaurant, he used it on his pizza assuming that it would be a good topping as he tasted it. This ended up mutating him into a mutant pizza that can manipulate pizzas.

==== Koya ====
Koya is a mutant brown falcon who only appears in the IDW comics.

In the IDW comics, Koya was Shredder's pet and used for reconnaissance. Following the "City Fall" storyline in the IDW Comics, Koya mutated into a humanoid form. At first a fierce antagonist of the Turtles, she develops respect for them when, during a mission in New York, she and her team led by Karai are forced to crash-land in Mutant Town and are nursed back to health by the Turtles.

==== Bludgeon ====
Bludgeon is a mutant hammerhead shark who appeared in the IDW comic "Teenage Mutant Ninja Turtles" issue 37. He was created by Shredder and used alongside Koya as his personal mutant strike team. After Bludgeon is permanently blinded by Donatello/Metalhead during the Vengeance storyline, he finds enlightenment and turns from assassin to self taught mystic, even to the point of training Venus.

==== Shinigami ====
Shinigami is a witch who is a friend of Karai debuting in the 2012 series, portrayed by Gwendoline Yeo.

Shinigami later showed up in the comics published by IDW Publishing.

==== Shredder Clones ====
The Shredder Clones are clones of Shredder. They consist of:

- Claw Shredder – A clone of Shredder with crustacean-like claws.
- Mini-Shredder – A small clone with a wrist blade on each arm.
- Shiva Shredder – A large brute with four arms.

The Shredder Clones first appeared in the Mirage Comics. Shredder claims that they were created through a combination of ancient magic, modern science, and a Paramecia Coloniex (a species of colony worms created by the Foot Clan) where they turned the remains of someone into a replica of said person while claiming that the Paramecia Coloniex fed on Oroku Saki's charred remains

The Shredder Clones appear in the 2003 animated series. They were referred to as Mutant Shredder Clones and kept in liquid vats within the Foot Clan's headquarters.

The Shredder Clones appear in the 2012 series, voiced by Kevin Michael Richardson. They were referred to as Shredder Mutants and were created by Baxter Stockman through a combination of Shredder's DNA and different crustaceans. They are first seen in "Return to New York", where they guard Stockman's laboratory. In "Attack of the Mega Shredder", Rocksteady and Bebop dump the Shredder Mutants into a mutagen vat, fusing them into a gigantic super-mutant dubbed Mega-Shredder. The Turtles cut off Mega-Shredder's tongue, killing it.

=== Krang ===
Krang is an alien warlord that comes from Dimension X in several incarnations of the series. The 1987 animated series featured him as disembodied brain, others as a rogue Utrom, such as the TMNT comic strips and the IDW comics.

In the 2012 series, Krang is referred to as Kraang Prime, and is the leader of a rogue hive mind faction of Utroms known as "the Kraang".

In Teenage Mutant Ninja Turtles: Mutant Mayhem, a woman named Cynthia Utrom is in charge of TCRI. Her surname and connection with Shredder (which is implied in the post credits scene) suggest that she may be revealed to be Krang in the future sequel.

=== Rock Soldiers ===
The Rock Soldiers (sometimes called Stone Warriors) are sentient humanoids that are made from rocks.

In the 1987 series, the Rock Soldiers work for Krang and come from Dimension X. It was revealed in "Michelangelo's Birthday" that they were made when mutagen fell on some rocks. The Soldiers are voiced by Rob Paulsen and Peter Renaday.

The Archie Comics version of the Rock Soldiers are the same. It also features the exclusive Rock Soldier Morg.

In the IDW comics, the Rock Soldiers were created by General Krang.

In the 2012 series, the Rock Soldiers work for the Kraang.

==== General Traag ====
General Traag is the leader of Krang's loyal Rock Soldiers from Dimension X.

In the 1987 series, Traag (voiced by Peter Renaday) came following the Neutrinos through the dimensional portal. After a small skirmish with the turtles, the Neutrinos teamed up with them and Michelangelo and Donatello sent both Traag and Granitor back through the portal and to their own dimension. Traag would make further appearances in the series until the eighth season finale "Turtle Trek".

He appeared in Archie Comics, the arcade game, and Teenage Mutant Ninja Turtles II: Back from the Sewers.

In the IDW comics, he is called "Captain Tragg" and helped Krang in trying to conquer the home planet of the Neutrinos and completely escaped after the battle in which the END rocket from Professor Honeycutt put all of the weapons of Krang's forces out of action.

In the 2012 series, Traag is a lava-spewing rock monster with regenerating abilities, who is in service to the Kraang. He first appeared in "TCRI," where he was brought by the Kraang through a portal that connected TCRI to Dimension X.

==== Sergeant Granitor ====
Sergeant Granitor is General Traag's right-hand man and one of Krang's loyal Rock Soldiers from Dimension X.

In the 1987 series, Granitor (voiced by Pat Fraley) came to Earth following the Neutrinos through the dimensional portal, originally appearing inside the Technodrome. After a skirmish with the turtles, where the turtles destroyed the rock warrior's weather-making machine, the Neutrinos teamed up with them and Michelangelo and Donatello sent both Granitor and General Tragg back through the portal and to Dimension X.

He appeared in the arcade game as the 4th scene's (7th stage) boss, and Teenage Mutant Ninja Turtles II: Back from the Sewers.

In the IDW comics, he is called "Sergeant Granitor" and commanded an assault on a Neutrino resistance bunker, to capture the Fugitoid and bring him back to Krang. Due to Granitor's command, the Neutrino bunker was destroyed and many innocent Neutrinos killed along with Fugitoid's family. Later on he and several other Rock Soldiers was searching the demolished base for Fugitoid. Granitor realized that the Fugitoid was Honeycutt and chased him through a portal to Earth. However, the Fugitoid disguises himself as a human and escapes from Granitor.

In the 2012 series, Granitor is a blue fire-spewing rock monster with regenerating abilities, who resembles Traag (but is pale-pink in color) and is in service to the Kraang.

=== Baxter Stockman ===
Baxter Stockman is a mad scientist and human enemy of the Ninja Turtles, becoming employed by Shredder in most incarnations.

In the Mirage era, after creating the MOUSERS, with April O'Neil as his computer programmer, Stockman used them to commit strange bank robberies by allowing them to dig small tunnels leading into the vaults. April found out and tried to escape through the MOUSER factory elevator, but Stockman sent the elevator (with her still in it) down to the sewer level, where a squadron of MOUSERS were waiting to capture her. The Ninja Turtles saved her and successfully infiltrated the factory, stopping Stockman and leaving him in police custody. However, he escaped some time later and began using technology from DARPA to build a robot body for him to install his own brain into, making him a cyborg. Stockman tried getting revenge on the Turtles, but his new body was electrocuted and seemingly destroyed.

In the 1987 animated series, Stockman (voiced by Pat Fraley) is a misguided Caucasian (it is believed to be a scrapped Ally character to the turtles re-purposed into Stockman) inventor who tried building his MOUSERS for the Ajax Pest Control company, but was told that it would only run them out of business and was kicked out of the building. Watching the whole scene through security cameras, Shredder approached him, offering an even better job, which Stockman accepted. Shredder had Stockman create a master control device for the MOUSERS so that the Foot Clan could use them to destroy the Ninja Turtles. However, the Turtles destroyed these MOUSERS and found Stockman's name on one of them, thus leading them to confront him and escape in his van. Though he was defeated and committed to an asylum, Stockman was later freed by Shredder when Krang withdrew Bebop and Rocksteady to Dimension X. Following a series of defeats, Krang attempts to kill Stockman by tossing him into a mutagen-powered disintegration chamber. Instead, Stockman survives and becomes a mutant housefly due to letting a housefly land on his clothes and get tossed into the unit with him.

In the 2003 animated series, Stockman runs a wealthy corporation on behalf of Shredder, but when he begins failing his master due to the intervention of the Turtles, Stockman begins suffering brutal mutilation and torture at the hands of Hun as punishment. At the end of season 1, Stockman makes a play to kill Shredder and the Turtles, but is defeated when his enemies team up. Stockman is forced to rejoin Shredder only to turn on him again early into Season 2. Stockman joins the New York mafia during the power vacuum after Shredder's apparent death, but is conscripted once again and is tortured so severely that he is reduced to a brain and an eye contained in a jar. In Season 4, Stockman attempts to create a clone body for himself, but the body deteriorates and he subsequently dies after an encounter with the Turtles. However, Bishop resurrects him, much to his dismay. Stockman remains with Bishop until decades after the end of Season 7, in which he is presumably killed in a lab accident. Stockman survives until the year 2105 when he tries to take revenge on Bishop, who is now the president of Earth. However, he is convinced by the reformed Bishop as well as the Turtles, who had been transported into the future, to stand down and make peace. Bishop promises to help Stockman finally regain a human body.

In the IDW comics, Stockman is the head of the StockGen company that created the Turtles and Splinter, who was tasked by Krang to experiment on mutagen. He would later become the Mayor of New York City.

In the 2012 animated series, Stockman (voiced by Phil LaMarr) was a child prodigy who was constantly bullied growing up. After several encounters with the Turtles, Stockman finds himself forcibly conscripted into the Foot Clan. Despite managing to flee on his own for a time, he is brought back in by Dogpound and threatened with being mutated should he step out of line. Shredder later goes through with mutating him into a fly after deeming his work unsatisfactory, and the mutation destroys much of Stockman's sanity. Stockman has no choice but to swear loyalty to the Foot Clan. Stockman begins receiving more civil treatment from Shredder as he begins serving full-time as his chief scientist, engineer, and medical officer. In the fourth season, Michelangelo returns Stockman to his human form using retro-mutagen on him. Stockman is furious, insisting he was stronger as a mutant.

In the 2014 film, Baxter Stockman (portrayed by K. Todd Freeman) appears briefly in a scene as one of Eric Sacks' scientists at TCRI. The role was later recast to Tyler Perry in Teenage Mutant Ninja Turtles: Out of the Shadows. Although a prominent industrialist and a genius who graduated MIT at 15, he is soon revealed to be working with the Foot Clan, using salvaged alien technology to rescue Shredder from jail by teleporting him away during a prison transport. Upon Shredder testing the purple mutagen on Bebop and Rocksteady, he notes that it taps into dormant animal DNA in their system from a point before life on Earth began to evolve in different routes causing them to mutate into a humanoid common warthog and black rhinoceros. When Shredder learns that the component Stockman has is one of three parts to a teleporter that would allow the alien warlord Krang to dispatch his ultimate war machine to Earth, he arranges for Stockman to assemble the other pieces. Once the portal device is complete, Shredder dismisses Stockman's efforts and has him taken away to the Foot Clan's facility in Tokyo.

In the 2018 series Rise of the Teenage Mutant Ninja Turtles, he is depicted as a young boy named Baxter Stockboy who works at his family's grocery store. He attempts to gain popularity online through the use of his inventions.

Baxter Stockman appears in Batman vs. Teenage Mutant Ninja Turtles, voiced by Keith Ferguson. Baxter is shown to be a mutant housefly. While he works for the Foot, he often expresses uncertainty about whether he is an employee or a hostage, considering that he has never been paid for his efforts.

Stockman appears in the 2023 animated film Teenage Mutant Ninja Turtles: Mutant Mayhem, voiced by Giancarlo Esposito. He is a former TCRI scientist who created the mutagen and housed a select few animals, including a housefly. Baxter is killed during a raid, but his mutations escape thanks to the fly, who acts as a separate character named Superfly (voiced by Ice Cube), who plans to construct a superweapon so that he can build a mutant army and enslave humanity for treating him and his family as outcast. He would later mutate into "SuperDuperFly" after being exposed to mutagen that merges him with a giant whale and other animals from the Brooklyn Zoo, where he uses his new form to destroy New York, eventually the Turtles and his turned family, along with humans, manage to defeat Superfly by using anti-mutagen and reduces him to a normal fly, where he is taken custody by Cynthia Utrom.

In the original TMNT arcade game, the Turtles face the human version of Stockman on the third level (The Sewer). He flies around the screen in a flying contraption throwing Mousers to attack the Turtles. When the game was released on the NES, the rematch with Rocksteady and Bebop on the parking garage level was replaced with a second battle with Baxter Stockman in his mutated fly form.

In Teenage Mutant Ninja Turtles: Fall of the Foot Clan for the Game Boy, Stockman's fly form is fought on the third level (The Highway). He swoops back and forth across the screen and shoots fireballs.

In Teenage Mutant Ninja Turtles II: Back from the Sewers for Game Boy, Stockman is the mid-boss in Stage 5.

In Teenage Mutant Ninja Turtles: The Manhattan Missions, Stockman can be seen in his lab during the fight with Usub Gerstalk.

In Teenage Mutant Ninja Turtles: Turtles in Time, Stockman once again returns in fly form on the first level (the construction site). He first appears on screen and says, "Terminate the turtles!" He attacks from the air and walks around and shoots at the player character with an Uzi. First he attacks with his Uzi, but after being damaged enough to lose the Uzi, he pulls out a weapon which fires 'solid energy' fists and feet to strike at the turtles, snickering whenever he lands a hit with it.

In Teenage Mutant Ninja Turtles: The Hyperstone Heist for the Mega Drive/Genesis, Stockman appears in human form as the fourth boss. He flies around in a machine while dropping Mousers on the player (much like the first arcade game).

The fly version of Stockman appears in the background of "Scrapyard" stage in the SNES version of Teenage Mutant Ninja Turtles: Tournament Fighters.

In addition to cutscenes, he was a boss in Teenage Mutant Ninja Turtles, which was based on the 2003 animated series.

He appeared as a boss in Teenage Mutant Ninja Turtles 2: Battle Nexus for the Game Boy Advance as the penultimate boss bout.

He appeared as a boss in Teenage Mutant Ninja Turtles: Arcade Attack.

Although not a boss, Stockman is the prime antagonist for the 2014 Teenage Mutant Ninja Turtles film video game adaptation for the Nintendo 3DS.

In the 2022 beat-'em-up Teenage Mutant Ninja Turtles: Shredder's Revenge, Baxter Stockman is a mutated fly who assembles and activates Krang to fight against the turtles. He is given the parts of the Krang body by Bebop and Rocksteady and Tempestra, then gains the final piece when the destruction of Metalhead activated its appearance. He is chased down by the Turtles, April, Splinter, and Casey Jones, who fight him and knock him unconscious, though he activates Krang before he can be defeated.

=== Lord Dregg ===
Lord Dregg is an alien warlord from Dimension X who replaced Shredder as the main antagonist in the last two seasons of the 1987 series, voiced by Tony Jay. In his first appearances, he attempted to take over the world, but his plans were constantly foiled by the Turtles. Eventually, he started a smear campaign against them, which turned the citizens of New York against them and in favor of him. This all came to an end in the episode "Doomquest". He is unable to fight the titular villain, and when the Turtles do so, he flees in fear, and the populace finally discover that the Turtles were heroes and Dregg was the villain (after April showed them a tape of his true motives). His last attempt involved using a robotic suit to absorb the powers of several other aliens, and kill the Turtles. His plan failed after Donatello and Michelangelo used Krang's android body to shrink him down and banish him to Dimension X.

A new version of Lord Dregg with the first name of Vrinigath appeared in the fourth season of the 2012 series, voiced by Peter Stormare. This version is an insectoid crime lord originating from the planet Sectoid 1.

=== Purple Dragons ===
Symbol of the Purple Dragons gang.

The Purple Dragons are a street gang that is documented to have connections with the Foot Clan in few incarnations and have clashed with the Ninja Turtles in several series.

They first appeared in the Mirage comics as the toughest gang from the Lower East Side in New York City. They often are led by Hun and have a connection to the Foot Clan, though not always. The leader of the "Black Dragons", apparently cut a deal with Officer Miller, which resulted in Hun being locked up and allowed him to gain control of the Purple Dragons. He then helped the Purple Dragons' one-time-rival Shredder wipe out the group, turning them into the Black Dragons: a gang subservient to the Foot Clan. In their first fight against the Teenage Mutant Ninja Turtles, the Purple Dragons found that their guns and knives are useless against their martial arts. The turtles managed to kill most of the members before the police arrive. The Purple Dragons appear again 25 years later in 2009. Decades ago, the gang's leader Hunter Mason (the true identity of Hun) delivered a brutal beating to a teen-aged Casey Jones, one of the Purple Dragons' bitterest enemies, prior to being thrown in jail. After being released from jail, Hun wiped out the Black Dragons, declaring his intentions to rebuild his criminal empire.

In the 2003 Teenage Mutant Ninja Turtles TV series, the Purple Dragons are led by Hun and have connections with the Foot Clan. Angel was an initiate of the Purple Dragons until Casey Jones convinced her to leave the group. Following Shredder's exile from Earth by the Utroms and the discovery that Shredder was an Utrom named Ch'rell, Hun began to strengthen the Purple Dragons, developing them from just a street gang to a country-wide organized crime syndicate.

In the IDW comics, the Purple Dragons are led by Angel Bridge and consisting of Chun, Link, and Malo. Unlike the other incarnations, the Purple Dragons are a "community watch" who do not like mutants or ninjas from the Foot Clan causing trouble on their turf. Angel's father Brooklyn S. Bridge and Arnold Jones (who is the identity of Hun in this continuity) had formerly used the Purple Dragons where their activities made the streets of Brooklyn unsafe. The leadership of the Purple Dragons was wrested from Angel by force by a resurrected Hun. As a result, the Purple Dragons reverted to their former existence as a violent street gang.

In the 2012 Teenage Mutant Ninja Turtles animated series, the Purple Dragons are a Chinese American gang who have connections with the Foot Clan. Besides Hun, they consist of Fong, Sid, and Tsoi.

In the 2018 Rise of the Teenage Mutant Ninja Turtles animated series, the Purple Dragons are a trio of snobby, tech club students named Kendra, Jason, and Jeremy at April's high school who use their skills for criminal acts. They are rivals with the Turtles, especially Donatello from how they both use technology.

The Purple Dragons appear in Tales of the Teenage Mutant Ninja Turtles. They are led by Kitsune (voiced by Tomoko Karina) and consist of Angel, Baseball Bat, Boomerang (voiced by Robbie Daymond), Cane (voiced by Kimberly Brooks), Chainsaw (voiced by Max Mittelman), Hun, Mini Golf (voiced by Robbie Daymond), Pipe (voiced by Kate Higgins), and Spuds.

==== Hun ====
Hunter "Hun" Mason is the leader of the Purple Dragons featured in the 2003 animated series.

Hun (voiced by Greg Carey) was an exceptionally large, muscular Caucasian with blonde hair that he wore in a ponytail and Purple Dragon and Foot tattoos on his arms. Having served as a lieutenant to Shredder and the leader of the Purple Dragons for years, he served as a recurring foe of the Turtles and a personal nemesis for Casey Jones, having set fire to a store owned by Casey's father and killing him. In the show's finale, Turtles Forever, Hun becomes a turtle mutant after being exposed to mutagen imported by the dimension-stranded 1987-Turtles.

Hun was subsequently included into the Mirage comic line, where he is also portrayed as a rising crime boss and the murderer of Casey's father.

In the IDW comics, Hun is the former alias of Casey's father, Arnold Jones, who in his youth was a member of the Purple Dragons, until a girl he met brought him back to an honest life. However, following her death, and lured by the lust of power, he reverts and joins Shredder's syndicate, but still cares for Casey. In the end, Hun sacrifices his life for Casey to save him from Agent Bishop.

In the 2012 animated series, Hun (voiced by Eric Bauza) is the new Chinese leader of the often-defeated Purple Dragons bearing a resemblance to Bruce Lee and possessing considerable martial arts skill.

In Tales of the Teenage Mutant Ninja Turtles, Hun (voiced by Carlin James) is a large Hispanic boy, a member of the Purple Dragons and a close friend of Angel. However, he has a soft spot for animals and does not believe in violence.

==== Dragon Face ====
Dragon Face is a member of the Purple Dragons.

Dragon Face was first seen in the 2003 animated series, voiced by Cedric Leake. He is a sub-leader of the Purple Dragons who sports a dragon tattoo on the left side of his face.

Dragon Face appeared in the Mirage comic Tales of the TMNT issue #67. He was seen in a drawing of Shadow Jones when she tells her classmates about what her father, grandfather, and uncles do where the drawing had him attacked by Casey Jones.

=== Rat King ===
The Rat King is an enigmatic enemy of the Ninja Turtles, with an apparent telepathic influence over rats. He is one of the only villains from the Mirage comics to reappear in the 1987 series, and he later appears in the 2003 and 2012 series.

=== Agent Bishop ===
Agent John Bishop was introduced in the 2003 series, leader of the Earth Protection Force, a group dedicated to protecting Earth from extraterrestrial attack, in the 2003 animated series, voiced by David Zen Mansley.

Originally a soldier in the Civil War, Bishop was abducted by aliens, which embittered him towards extraterrestrials and led him to start the Earth Protection Force (EPF). Through unknown means-possibly the use of clones of himself created using alien technology-Bishop survived into modern times, and first came into conflict with the turtles when the D'Hoonib Federation and the Triceraton Republic brought their war to Earth. Having forged an alliance with the Federation, Bishop helped them secure the Fugitoid in exchange for having the Turtles to examine. Bishop had previously captured and experimented upon the Turtles' friend Leatherhead, who had previously been thought deceased, and in examining him and the Turtles found their genetic mutations to hold great promise for his never-ending war with aliens. The Turtles and Leatherhead managed to escape his clutches and fought him, but Bishop's abilities proved impressive enough to enable his escape as well. Bishop would clash with the Turtles several times, but becomes a begrudging ally to the Turtles against the new Tengu Shredder.

A future version known as President Bishop appears in Teenage Mutant Ninja Turtles: Fast Forward. As head of the Pan-Galactic Alliance, he has become a pro-alien liaison to the Turtles after an alien prisoner saved his life 50 years prior.

An alternate version of Bishop, an Utrom, was introduced in the 2012 television series; this one appears as an ally rather than an enemy of the Turtles and battled the Kraang. He was voiced by Nolan North.

An IDW version of John Bishop exists, as the son of Wayne Bishop, founder of the EPF. Wayne infused his infant son, a sickly preemie, with alien DNA obtained from the Roswell incident to save him from an early death, but thereby turned him into a disfigured mutant who requires a robotic exobody to appear human.

A reimagined, female incarnation of Bishop named Dr. Josefina Bishop appears in Tales of the Teenage Mutant Ninja Turtles. She is an inventor who is later recruited into the Earth Protection Force who receives Rod Underwood Jr. as a benefactor.

=== Go Komodo ===
Go Komodo appears in volume 3 of the original comics, published by Image Comics. He is a powerful Japanese businessman with properties in New York who surrounds himself with the trappings of a feudal Japanese daimyo. He secretly has a curse that causes him to transform into a large Komodo dragon, and seeks the Turtles and Splinter to learn the secrets of the mutagen in their blood to gain control of the condition. To that end he hires cyborgs to assault the TMNT, setting into motion the events of the series.

=== King Komodo ===
King Komodo is a mutant Komodo dragon who was part of Go Komodo's menagerie before being accidentally mutated. He winds up biting off Leonardo's hand (which later grew back). He winds up turning on Go Komodo, killing him and taking his identity when he realizes he can transform into an identical appearance. He leaves to take over Go Komodo's Japanese operations on friendly terms with the Turtles.

=== Groundchuck and Dirtbag ===
Groundchuck and Dirtbag are a mutant cattle and a mutant mole.

Groundchuck and Dirtbag first appear in the 1987 series episode "Planet of the Turtleloids", voiced by Robert Ridgely and Pat Fraley. Shredder and Krang originally planned to mutate a lion and a gorilla at a zoo to be their latest henchmen. Due to the Turtleloid Kerma leading the two animals away while Shredder and Krang were getting the Mutagen dispenser prepared, a cattle and a mole were accidentally released by Bebop and Rocksteady and were mutated instead. Groundchuck was given high-tech armor and a crossbow while Dirtbag received road worker clothes and a high tech shovel as a weapon.

In the IDW Publishing series, two characters loosely based on Groundchuck and Dirtbag named Chuck and D.B appear. These versions are humans who were mutated by Old Hob's mutagen bomb. Chuck is a mutant cattle with a missing eye and a metallic right horn while D.B. is a mutant naked mole rat with bolts on his back and a skin graft on his right leg and right foot.

=== Antrax ===
Antrax is an ant villain.

In the 1987 TV series, Antrax appears in the episode "Night of the Rogues", voiced by Pat Fraley. He is among the villains who Shredder assembled to attack the Turtles. His toyline bio states that Antrax is Krang's executioner from Dimension X.

In the 2012 TV series, Antrax is a mutant ant created by Baxter Stockman. Its abdomen can produce clones of itself.

In Tales of the Teenage Mutant Ninja Turtles, Antrax (voiced by Peter Stormare) is among the mass-produced creations of Dr. Jordan Perry.

=== Scumbug ===
Scumbug is an insect villain.

In the 1987 series, Scumbug appears in the episode "Night of the Rogues", voiced by Barry Gordon. He is among the villains who Shredder assembled to attack the Turtles. His toyline bio states that Scumbug is a former exterminator who was hired by Shredder and Krang and became a mutant cockroach after coming into contact with some mutagen and one of the cockroaches.

In the Archie Comics continuity, Scumbug was hired by Shredder disguised as a businessman to do some pest control at his latest hideout Saki Inc. He is later mutated after slipping on some spilled mutagen while chasing a cockroach.

In the 2012 series, Scumbug is voiced by Ted Biaselli. He is an unnamed stuck-up businessman who Baxter Stockman kidnapped and mutated into a stag beetle/spider mutant.

A female version of Scumbug in Teenage Mutant Ninja Turtles: Mutant Mayhem, with her vocal effects provided by a blend of Alex Hirsch and several uncredited voice actors. Despite the advertisements identifying the character as "himself", the film, as well as the filmmakers, clearly identify her as female. Scumbug is depicted as a mutant cockroach who speaks in "vermin" which Splinter can understand and is a member of Superfly's gang. By the end of the film following Superfly's defeat, Scumbug and Splinter of them become a couple much to the Turtles' disgust.

Scumbug appeared in Tales of the Teenage Mutant Ninja Turtles, voiced again by Alex Hirsch.

=== Scratch ===
Scratch is a mutant cat.

In the toyline associated with the 1980s TV series, Scratch is a mutant cat in prison attire and a master of trickery who is allied with Shredder. He also has a sidekick named Jail Bird.

In Tales of the Teenage Mutant Ninja Turtles, Scratch is a mutant cat in prisoner attire who is one of Shredder's mutant allies.

In Teenage Mutant Ninja Turtles III: Radical Rescue, Scratch appears as the first boss.

In the ongoing IDW Publishing comic series Teenage Mutant Ninja Turtles: Saturday Morning Adventures which is in the same continuity as the 80s series, Scratch is a mutant cat who is a majordomo for the Pantheon.

Scratch appears in the Tales of the Teenage Mutant Ninja Turtles TV series, voiced by Fred Armisen. This version has a backstory similar to Old Hob.

=== Savanti Romero ===
Savanti Romero is a former servant of Lord Simultaneous and an enemy of Renet. He appears in the Mirage and IDW Comics.

In the 2003 animated series, Romero is voiced by David Zen Mansley. He retains his Mirage backstory of being a transformed treacherous apprentice of Lord Simultaneous, and is first shown trying to capture the Time Scepter in Earth's Middle Ages. When foiled by the Turtles and Renet, Lord Simultaneous banished him further back in time to Earth's Cretaceous Period. Romero would serve as the main antagonist of the "Return of Savanti" two-parter in which he tries to avert the asteroid impact that would wipe out the dinosaurs, seeking to rule the Earth in a world where humanity never evolves. The Turtles and Renet once again defeated him, and this time Romero perished for good.

In the 2012 series, Romero is voiced by Graham McTavish and is much more comedic than his 2003 counterpart. As with his previous incarnations, he is defeated by the Turtles and Renet in Earth's Middle Ages and banished to the Cretaceous Period. However, he makes his way back to the present and begins traveling through time to build an army of monsters, bringing in the likes of Count Dracula, the mummy of an unnamed Pharaoh, a werewolf named Vulko, and Frankenstein's monster. Romero enters a power struggle with Dracula who commands most of their forces, and agrees to an equal partnership with him. However, Dracula is killed during the final battle with the Turtles and Romero is returned to the Cretaceous Period, this time being killed by a dinosaur for good.

=== Null ===
Null is a male human/demon who appears as an antagonist in the Archie Comics. He is a businessman whose cyborg servants were responsible for killing several of the Mighty Mutanimals. Null is also shown to be associated with the Four Horsemen of Apocalypse.

In the IDW comics, Madame Null is a female denizen of Dimension Z and the CEO of Null Group.

=== Four Horsemen of the Apocalypse ===
The Four Horsemen of the Apocalypse are shown to be associated with Null in the Archie Comics.

==== War ====
War is a spiky demon and a member of the Four Horsemen of the Apocalypse.

War appeared in the video game TMNT Tournament Fighters.

==== Famine ====
Famine is a thin demon and a member of the Four Horsemen of the Apocalypse.

==== Pestilence ====
Pestilence is a demon made up of a thousand black insects and member of the Four Horsemen of the Apocalypse.

==== Death ====
Death is a hooded robed skeleton with a scythe and leader of the Four Horsemen of the Apocalypse who resembles the Grim Reaper.

=== Gang of Four ===
The Gang of Four are a gang of mercenaries in Teenage Mutant Ninja Turtles.

In the Archie Comics, the Gang of Four are Thanasoids associated with Null and are corpses that were resurrected and enhanced with cybernetics.

In the IDW continuity, the Gang of Four are mercenaries whose cybernetic enhancements allow them to shift between their human and mutant forms.

==== Fist ====
Fist is the leader of the Gang of Four.

In the Archie Comics, Fist is a human mercenary who was brought back to life as a Thanasoid and possesses detachable fists. He took part in the death of the Mighty Mutanimals. Raphael later avenges the Mighty Mutanimals' deaths by killing Fist.

In the IDW continuity, Fist is a cybernetic mercenary. His cybernetics enables him to transform into a mutant wolf. Fist later transforms into a mutant turtle using Donatello's salvaged blood.

==== Dead-Eye ====
Deadeye is a member of the Gang of Four.

In the Archie Comics, Dead-Eye is a Thanasoid with a single cybernetic eye for a head whose torso comes out of the seat part of a motorcycle. He was killed by Ninjara.

In the IDW continuity, a character based on Dead-Eye named Deadaim is a cybernetic mercenary. His cybernetics enable him to transform into a mutant wolf.

==== Lynch ====
Lynch is a member of the Gang of Four.

In the Archie Comics, Lynch was a Thanasoid with expert marksmanship who took part in the death of the Mighty Mutanimals. After being interrogated by Raphael on who hired him, Lynch was killed by Raphael.

In the IDW continuity, Lynch is a cybernetic mercenary. His cybernetics enable him to transform into a mutant wolf.

==== Waster ====
Waster is a member of the Gang of Four.

In the Archie Comics, Waster was a Thanasoid with a human-like mask and a whip-like "tongue" who wielded an enery rifle. He took part in the death of the Mighty Mutanimals. Waster was later killed by the Ninja Turtles and Slash.

In the IDW continuity, Waster is a cybernetic mercenary. His cybernetics enable him to transform into a mutant wolf.

=== Maligna ===
Maligna is the mother and queen of the Malignoids. She appears as one of the antagonists of the Archie comics and later appears in the IDW comics.

=== Monsterex ===
Monsterex is a monster in Archie Comics. It first appears in Teenage Mutant Ninja Turtles Adventures Special #2 story titled "The Night of Monsterex" where it is created after Krang strikes the Turtles' television with a mutagen ray while they are watching a horror film containing a variety of monsters trying to save the Bride of Frankenstein from an unnamed mad scientist. This destroys the television and creates Monsterex, a two-headed hybrid of Frankenstein's monster, a vampire, a werewolf, and a Gill-man as well as sporting bandages.

=== Adversary ===
Adversary was a demon from the Mirage Comics.

=== Armaggon ===
Armaggon is a great white shark-like adversary of the Teenage Mutant Ninja Turtles.

In the Archie Comics, Armaggon is a mutant great white shark who originates from the future.

In the IDW Comics, Armaggon is a Megalodon who was accidentally mutated by Donatello when the Turtle travelled through time in an attempt to prevent the same menace Armaggon would pose. In constant pain from his forced transformation and seeking to prevent it, Armaggon travels through time to destroy the Turtles at their genesis.

In the 2012 TV series, Armaggon is voiced by Ron Perlman. This version is a shark-like alien bounty hunter and an assassin who is wanted in 87 star systems.

=== Bellybomb ===
Bellybomb is an alien outlaw with one eyestalk and a mouth on his stomach.

In the Archie Comics, Bellybomb was sentenced to 17 life sentences on the toxic waste dump Morbus for extortion, armed robbery, man eating, brain poaching, soul thievery, and impersonating a deity named Bob. After Slash kills the guards on Morbus, Krang and Bellybomb escape with him. After the ship lands on an Eden World where Rocksteady and Bebop were on, the two of them accompanied the villains back to Earth. Once on Earth, Bellybomb grafts Krang to Shredder's body while the Turtles were busy fighting Rocksteady, Bebop, and Slash. After the Turtles freed Shredder from Krang's control, Bellybomb and Krang were sent back to Morbus while Slash escapes.

In the 2012 series, Vrax Belebome (voiced by Charlie Murphy) is a shady information dealer who the Fugitoid and the Ninja Turtles visit at Zayford's Cantina to get intel on the Triceraton mothership.

=== Scale Tail ===
Scale Tail is a cobra-like alien bounty hunter with snake-headed hands who first appeared in the 1993 video game Radical Rescue.

In the 1992 toyline, Scale Tail is mentioned to be an ally of Krang.

In Tales of the Teenage Mutant Ninja Turtles, Scale Tail is among the mass-produced creations of Dr. Jordan Perry.

=== Wyrm ===
Wyrm is a mutant worm.

In the Archie Comics, Wyrm is a flatworm who was exposed to mutagen that was spilled by Bebop and Rocksteady. He ended up fighting Scumbug during his fight with the Teenage Mutant Ninja Turtles.

Wyrm the 2012 TV series, voiced by Dwight Schultz. This version is a worm-like creature, one of the three known reality-bending creature, and a Creator of Chaos who was put into a fifth-dimensional prison years ago. When granting wishes, he has three rules: a wish has to be shared, cannot be used to gain more wishes, and cannot be used to harm Wyrm.

In the IDW continuity, Wyrm was the result of a group of flatworms being mutated into one mutant.

Wyrm appears in Tales of the Teenage Mutant Ninja Turtles, voiced by Fred Tatasciore. This version is an earthworm who is among the mass-produced creations of Dr. Jordan Perry.

=== Darius Dun ===
Darius Dun is one of the main villains of Fast Forward in the 2003 animated series and later a minor villain in the IDW comics.

In the "Fast Forward" series, Darius Dunn is the uncle, legal guardian, and only relative of Cody Jones who works as the CEO of O'Neil Tech following the death of his parents. He also contracted the Kanabo warlord Sh'Okanabo to create for him the Dark Turtles who are made from the DNA of the Ninja Turtles and the Kanabo.

In the IDW comics, Darius Dun is the financier and benefactor of the Street Phantoms.

=== Street Phantoms ===
The Street Phantoms are a hi-tech group of criminals who appear in the Fast Forward series and later in the IDW comics.

In the IDW comics, the Street Phantoms work as the enforcers of Darius Dun.

==== Jammerhead ====
Jammerhead is the leader of the Street Phantoms in the 2003 animated series and as Jammer in the IDW comics.

=== Kitsune ===
Kitsune is a character in Teenage Mutant Ninja Turtles.

In IDW Publishing, Kitsune is a fox deity, the youngest daughter of The Dragon, and member of the Pantheon who was responsible for the rise of the Foot Clan.

In Tales of the Teenage Mutant Ninja Turtles, a human version of Kitsune appears who is voiced by Tomoko Karina. This version is the leader of the Purple Dragons.

== Other major characters ==
=== Irma Langenstein ===
Irma Langenstein (sometimes spelled Irma Langinstein) is April O'Neil's friend and ally to the Ninja Turtles who introduced in the 1987 series as April's Channel Six co-worker, voiced by Jennifer Darling. She also appears in the Archie Comics and IDW comics.

In the 2012 animated series, Irma (voiced by Kate Micucci) is an android utilized by Kraang Subprime to gain April's trust and infiltrate the Turtles' lair. The Irma body was originally created by Rook (also voiced by Kate Micucci), a member of the Utrom High Council, before one of those bodies was stolen by Subprime.

In Tales of the Teenage Mutant Ninja Turtles, Irma (voiced by Shelby Young) is a student at Eastman High and fellow classmate of Donatello, who are both members of the school's Robotics Club.

=== Venus de Milo ===
Venus de Milo was introduced as the first female Ninja Turtle in Ninja Turtles: The Next Mutation and was created specifically for that iteration. Unlike the four original Turtles, she utilises ancient shamanistic magic rather than ninjitsu. Within the continuity of the series when Splinter rescued the Turtles, he accidentally left Venus behind. She made her way to Chinatown and was found and raised as a daughter by a Shinobi magician who named her Mei Pieh Chi.

A new version of Venus was released in the IDW Comics continuity with Issue #127 on March 30, 2022. This incarnation is a Frankenstein-like creature with telepathic abilities created by the mad mutant surgeon Doctor Jasper Barlow from the remains of a female Punk Frog named Bonnie.

=== Jennika ===
Jennika (nicknamed Jenny) is the second female turtle introduced in the franchise after Venus de Milo. She was created for the IDW Comics series. She wears a yellow mask and her weapon of choice are tekko kagi claws. She was initially a human foot clan member. After being defeated in an assassination attempt on Splinter, she was put under the tutelage of Leonardo and began to warm up to her new family. After being stabbed by Karai, Jennika was given an emergency blood transfusion from Leonardo. The mutagen and turtle DNA in Leo's blood bonded with Jennika and mutated her into a mutant turtle. Despite her loyalty to the team, due to her near-death experience, Jennika still has unresolved anger issues towards Karai.

Starting from issue #117, Jennika was revealed to be bisexual, forming a new romantic relationship with one of the mutants of Mutant Town, the pig mutant Sheena, due to their shared love of music.

In addition to the mainline Turtles comic book series by IDW, Jennika has also been the lead in the three-issue miniseries Teenage Mutant Ninja Turtles: Jennika in 2019, which was followed by the six-issue sequel miniseries Teenage Mutant Ninja Turtles: Jennika II in 2020.

=== Baron Draxum ===
Baron Draxum (nicknamed Barry) is from Rise of the Teenage Mutant Ninja Turtles (voiced by John Cena in season one, Roger Craig Smith in season two). As the self-proclaimed protector of all Yōkai, Draxum seeks to mutate humanity to avert a prophecy predicting their destruction.

== Races ==
=== Federation ===
The Federation are a humanoid species. Most versions have them as rivals of the Triceratons.

In the Mirage Comics, the Federation control a huge volume of the galaxy.

In the IDW continuity, the Federation originate from Dimension X.

=== Neutrinos ===
The Neutrinos are extra-dimensional beings from Dimension X. They first appeared in the 1987 animated series as a group of elf-like aliens, a trait which is carried over to the Archie Comics continuity.

A trio of Neutrinos appear in the 2012 series, all voiced by Clancy Brown. These versions are microscopic aliens with a bulky, intimidating design.

In the IDW Publishing comics, the Neutrinos are elf-like and are depicted as having a resistance against Krang and his Stone Soldiers. In these comics, the Fugitoid was originally a Neutrino.

The Neutrinos make minor appearances in Teenage Mutant Ninja Turtles: Shredder's Revenge.

=== Protoceratons ===
The Protoceratons are Protoceratops-like aliens.

In the Mirage Comics, they are longtime allies of the Styracodons.

=== Styracodons ===
The Styracodons are Styracosaurus-like aliens.

In the Mirage Comics, they are longtime rivals of the Triceratons.

=== Triceratons ===
The Triceratons are Triceratops-like aliens who govern a wide empire/Triceraton Republic. They are enemies of the Turtles and the Fugitoid. Most versions of them are often in conflict with the Federation.

In IDW Publishing, the Triceratons are mutant Triceratops created by the Utroms. Sometime after Krang's death, the Triceratons resided on Burnow Island with the Krang.

=== Utroms ===
The Utroms are a race of aliens from Dimension X.

In the Mirage Comics, some Utroms were stranded on Earth and used TCRI as a front in order to interact with humans.

In the 2003 TV series, the first Shredder was an Utrom war criminal named Ch'rell.

In IDW Publishing, the Utrom reside on the planet Utronium in Dimension X. Krang is depicted as an Utrom warlord. Sometime after Krang's death, the remaining Utroms reside on Burnow Island with the Triceratons.

== Locations ==
=== Dimension X ===
Dimension X is a parallel dimension that has various adaptions in each media appearance:

In the 1987 series, Dimension X is the home of several characters, most notably Krang, one of the series' main antagonists. Krang typically uses the Dimensional Portal located inside the Technodrome for transportation between Dimension X and Earth, although other portals and means of travel are occasionally seen. It is depicted as a hostile, war-torn galaxy with foreboding landscapes and many fierce monsters.

In the Archie Comics, Dimension X is a spiral galaxy in which numerous inhabited (or habitable) worlds are located. It was originally governed by theocrats, banishing all warlords. Later, there is a conflict between the Imperial Aerwyl Fleet and the Nova Squadron.

In the IDW Comics, Dimension X is a warzone controlled by Krang where the Utroms, the Triceratons, and the Neutrinos are fighting for their planets.

In the 2012 Teenage Mutant Ninja Turtles TV series, Dimension X is the home dimension of the Kraang and the Utrom. The water of Dimension X contains hydrocarbon that can melt anything from Earth. Time moves faster in Dimension X, with Leatherhead spending decades there within the period of a year passing on Earth. Dimension X is also home to the Triceratons and has served as the battleground for a war between them and the Kraang.

Dimension X was featured, unnamed, in the 2016 sequel film to the 2014 film. The filmmakers first expressed interest in featuring the Dimension X in the sequel in 2014. In the film, Shredder is transported from a police convoy to the Technodrome in Dimension X in which he agrees to help Krang conquer Earth.

== Crossover characters ==
Several characters from other comic book series have crossed-over into the TMNT universes. Notable appearances are listed below:

=== Miyamoto Usagi ===
Miyamoto Usagi is a samurai rabbit and master swordsman from an alternative universe's 16th century Edo period in Japan, where animals are the dominant species, not humans. He appeared in two episodes of the 1987 series. Usagi Yojimbo is a comic book series created by Stan Sakai starring the rōnin hero rabbit, Miyamoto Usagi, which had several crossovers with the TMNT comics; however, the TV show writers did not understand the distinction and misnamed the character after the comic book.

The character returned for the 2003 animated series with his actual name Miyamoto Usagi, and became a friend and close ally of the turtles, especially developing a strong friendship with Leonardo, since both are swordsmen, and during Season 4 he is summoned by Splinter to talk with Leonardo about Leo's new harsher attitude (as a result of the Turtles and Splinter nearly sacrificing themselves against Utrom Shredder at the end of the third season). Leonardo also ended up in Usagi's dimension when Ultimate Draco scattered the five mutants to different parts of the multiverse. In the series finale, he is invited to April and Casey's wedding.

=== Wild West C.O.W.-Boys of Moo Mesa ===
The Wild West C.O.W.-Boys of Moo Mesa are a trio of anthropomorphic cattle that work as cowboys, defending their home of Cowtown from various criminals. The group consists of Marshal Moo Montana, Dakota Dude, and Cowlorado Kid.

In issue #21 of Tales of the TMNT, the Teenage Mutant Ninja Turtles aided the C.O.W.-Boys into stopping the Masked Bull (the criminal alias of Sheriff Terrorbull) from stealing a magic crystal shard.

== See also ==
- List of Teenage Mutant Ninja Turtles (1987 TV series) characters
- List of Ninja Turtles: The Next Mutation characters
- List of Teenage Mutant Ninja Turtles (2003 TV series) characters
- List of Teenage Mutant Ninja Turtles (2012 TV series) characters
- List of Rise of the Teenage Mutant Ninja Turtles (2018 TV series) characters
