= Teenage Mutant Ninja Turtles III: The Manhattan Project =

1991 video game

- North American box art
- Developer: Konami
- Publisher: Konami
- Director: Team Kuu-Neru-Asobu
- Programmers: Satoshi Kishiwada; Takashi Kondo; Yasuhiro Yamamoto
- Artists: Yasuji Terada; Tetsurou Eguchi; Tetsuya Satou; Masaaki Kishimoto; Fumimasa Katakami
- Composers: Yuichi Sakakura; Tomoya Tomita; Kozo Nakamura
- Series: Teenage Mutant Ninja Turtles
- Platform: Nintendo Entertainment System
- Release: JP: December 13, 1991; NA: February 1992
- Genre: Beat 'em up
- Modes: Single-player, multiplayer

Teenage Mutant Ninja Turtles III: The Manhattan Project (Note: ティーンエージ ミュータント ニンジャ タートルズ2 ザ マンハッタン プロジェクト, Tīnēji Myūtanto Ninja Tātoruzu 2 Za Manhattan Purojekuto; lit. 'Teenage Mutant Ninja Turtles 2: The Manhattan Project') is a 1991 beat 'em up game developed and published by Konami for the Family Computer (Famicom) in Japan and for the Nintendo Entertainment System in North America in 1992. It is the third video game iteration of the Teenage Mutant Ninja Turtles for the NES. The game features play mechanics similar to the previous game, Teenage Mutant Ninja Turtles II: The Arcade Game, but it is an original title for the NES without any preceding arcade version. It is based on the 1987 Teenage Mutant Ninja Turtles animated series, being released after the show's 5th season. The game was re-released as part of Teenage Mutant Ninja Turtles: The Cowabunga Collection in 2022.

== Plot ==
The game begins with the Turtles spending their vacation in Key West, Florida. While watching April O'Neil's latest news report, her broadcast is suddenly hijacked by the Turtles' nemesis, Shredder. Taking April as his hostage, Shredder reveals that he has also turned the entire borough of Manhattan into a floating island and challenges the Turtles to come to his lair to stop him.

== Gameplay ==
Teenage Mutant Ninja Turtles III can be played by up to two players simultaneously, with each player controlling a different character. The player can choose between any of the four turtles: Leonardo, Raphael, Michelangelo and Donatello, each wielding their signature weapon. Two different 2-player modes are featured in the game, the first mode allows both players to hurt each other with their attacks, while the other mode disables this feature. The player has a limited number of lives that gets depleted every time the player's energy gauge runs out. If one player has run out of lives, they can use the remaining ones from the other player's remaining stock (this is possible to do in the one-player mode as well). The player is allowed to change their character every time they lose life. Up to three chances to continue are provided.

The controls are mostly unchanged from the second NES game, with one attack button and one jump button. The turtles can now perform a toss attack against their enemies by holding the D-pad downwards while pressing B. Each turtle also has a different special attack that is performed by pressing B and A simultaneously. Every time the player performs this attack, a portion of their energy will be lost, unless they are on their last bar of life.

The game is composed of a total of eight levels, spanning from the beaches of Florida to the floating island of Manhattan to the Technodrome, ultimately concluding with Shredder's lair and finally to Krang's Spaceship. The game's regular enemies include a variety of Foot Soldiers, as well as Giant Mousers and Stone Warriors. The game's bosses include villains from the cartoon series and toyline such as Dirtbag, Groundchuck, Slash, and Leatherhead, in addition to the return of Shredder and Krang, along with Bebop and Rocksteady. Tokka and Rahzar from the film Teenage Mutant Ninja Turtles II: The Secret of the Ooze also appear, alongside Shredder's mutated counterpart from the film Super Shredder as the game's final boss. Despite being featured on the cover, a Triceraton is not in the game.

== Releases ==
The game was released for the Family Computer (or Famicom) in Japan a few months earlier than the American version under the title of Teenage Mutant Ninja Turtles 2: The Manhattan Project. The difference in numbering was because the first Turtles game for the NES was localized in Japan under a different title. Unlike the other Turtles games for the NES, Manhattan Project was never released in the PAL region, with The Cowabunga Collection marking its first release in PAL territories.

Differences between the Famicom and NES version in addition to the title include:

- Whereas the NES version requires players to input a form of the Konami Code in order to access the Option screen, the Famicom version has it accessible by default from the title menu. Entering the Konami Code in the Famicom version will simply return a generic congratulatory screen instead.
- Instead of two different 2-player modes, the Famicom version has a "game type" setting on the option screen that allows friendly damage to be turned on or off by setting it to "A" or "B" respectively. This also gives the added benefit of allowing a second player to join in during a 1-player game with the friendly fire turned off.
- Two extra cheat codes were added to the Famicom version: a stage select code (since the setting is not available on the default option screen) and a code that increases the number of continues.
- The NES version uses a Nintendo-manufactured MMC3 chip to control the game's program, whereas the Famicom version uses the Konami manufactured VRC4 chip.

== Reception ==
Reception

Review scores
Publication	Score
AllGame	4/5
Electronic Gaming Monthly	8/10, 8/10, 7/10, 7/10
Famitsu	7/10, 9/10, 6/10, 5/10
Hippon Super!	6/10

Award
Publication	Award
Nintendo Power Award '92	Best Overall Game

Ichiro Tezuka writing for Hippon Super! complimented on The Manhattan Project's visual presentation, while saying the angled perspective and depth of field makes it difficult to judge distances. Tezuka said he wished the game had focused on more strict 2D gameplay as seen in games like Yie Ar Kung-Fu (1984). In the Japanese gaming magazine Famitsu, the game was reviewed by four critics. One reviewer found the game highly appealing in terms of graphics, such how enemies leap out of hidden spots. While one reviewer found the turtles unappealing, another found them drawn especially cute in this game. One of the reviewers called it the best of the recent Famicom games, while one said the gameplay was monotonous and another said the game would appeal to fans of this style of action game.

The Manhattan Project was awarded Best NES Game of 1992 by Electronic Gaming Monthly. Allgame editor Brett Alan Weiss described it as "an excellent, well-rounded game".
