= Teenage Mutant Ninja Turtles (2003 video game) =

- North American PS2 cover art
- Developer: Konami Computer Entertainment Studios
- Publisher: Konami
- Director: Yuji Kojima
- Producer: Kengo Nakamura
- Composers: Yuichi Tsuchiya; Masanori Akita
- Series: Teenage Mutant Ninja Turtles
- Platforms: PlayStation 2, Xbox, GameCube, Microsoft Windows
- Release: GameCube, PlayStation 2 & Xbox: NA: October 21, 2003; PAL: April 16, 2004 (PS2, Xbox); PAL: April 30, 2004 (GC); Windows: NA: November 25, 2003; PAL: April 23, 2004
- Genre: Beat 'em up
- Modes: Single-player, multiplayer

Teenage Mutant Ninja Turtles is a 2003 beat 'em up game developed and published by Konami, based on the 2003 Teenage Mutant Ninja Turtles TV series. It loosely adapts the events of the show's first season.

The game is the first Teenage Mutant Ninja Turtles video game to be developed by Konami in roughly a decade, following the release of Teenage Mutant Ninja Turtles: Tournament Fighters (1993). It was released for GameCube, PlayStation 2, Xbox and Windows in late 2003 in North America, followed by a European release the following April. A demo was also available via a special edition bonus disc packaged with Mario Kart: Double Dash (2003) in North America.

The game received two sequels: Teenage Mutant Ninja Turtles 2: Battle Nexus in 2004, and Teenage Mutant Ninja Turtles 3: Mutant Nightmare in 2005.

== Gameplay ==
Screenshot of gameplay

The player can play as either Leonardo, Donatello, Michelangelo or Raphael. Each turtle has his own unique set of levels to complete. There is a story mode for one or two players, and also a versus mode where two players can fight head to head. In the versus mode, players can fight as all four turtles, Splinter, Casey Jones, Hamato Yoshi, the Turtlebot, Hun, Oroku Saki, and Shredder.

A "Challenge" mode is unlocked by defeating Oroku Saki with any Turtle in the Story Mode, which needs to be complete to unlock Hamato Yoshi and his dojo.

== Plot ==
The main gameplay loosely adapts the following season one episodes: "Things Change", "A Better Mouse Trap", "Attack of the Mouser"s, "Meet Casey Jones", "Nano", "Darkness on the Edge of Town", "The Way of Invisibility", "Notes From the Underground" (Parts 1-3), and "Return to New York" (Parts 1-3).

Shortly after a group of Mouser Robots destroy the Turtles' old home, they begin to look for a new one. Michelangelo eventually gets on Raphael's nerves, causing Raphael to leave for the surface. There, he is confronted by Purple Dragon thugs, Casey Jones, and Dragonface. Baxter Stockman soon uses invisible Foot ninjas to capture Raphael, and Donatello is forced to rescue him. Afterward, Donatello analyzes a strange crystal he found in their home, noting that they look like mutated brain cells. Raphael kicks Michelangelo into a wall, revealing a large tunnel behind it. Donatello's crystal start glowing and the Turtles decide to investigate. They follow the tunnel and they are confronted by genetically mutated humans.

After a few scuffles with these mutants, the Turtles find that these mutants were turned into their current state by past experiments of Shredder's scientists. The crystals Donatello found are the only thing keeping these mutants alive, and cannot leave their underground home as a result. They plead the Turtles to defeat Shredder, so that no more humans will suffer as they have. The Turtles decide to defeat Shredder once and for all, and promise the mutants that they will come back for them if they ever find a way to reverse their condition.

== Reception ==
Reception

Aggregate score
Aggregator	Score			
Aggregator	GameCube	PC	PS2	Xbox
Metacritic	57/100	55/100	59/100	56/100

Review scores
Publication	Score			
Publication	GameCube	PC	PS2	Xbox
Computer Gaming World	N/A	1.5/5	N/A	N/A
Electronic Gaming Monthly	6.17/10 (Note: Three critics of Electronic Gaming Monthly gave the console versions each a score of 5.5/10, 6/10, and 7/10.)	N/A	6.17/10	6.17/10
Eurogamer	N/A	N/A	3/10	N/A
Game Informer	N/A	N/A	7.75/10	N/A
GameRevolution	N/A	N/A	C−	N/A
GameSpot	6.5/10	6.3/10	6.5/10	6.5/10
GameSpy	2/5	N/A	2/5	2/5
GameZone	N/A	6.5/10	5/10	N/A
IGN	5.3/10	5.3/10	5.3/10	5.3/10
Nintendo Power	2.6/5	N/A	N/A	N/A
Nintendo World Report	8/10	N/A	N/A	N/A
Official U.S. PlayStation Magazine	N/A	N/A	2.5/5	N/A
Official Xbox Magazine (US)	N/A	N/A	N/A	5/10
PC Gamer (US)	N/A	69%	N/A	N/A

Teenage Mutant Ninja Turtles received "mixed" reviews on all platforms according to the review aggregation website Metacritic. The D-Pad Destroyer of GamePro said of the PlayStation 2 version, "For old-school beat-em-up fans, Turtles likely will be a guilty pleasure. It's long, difficult, and a treat to the eyes and the nostalgic heart. It's just that humans have evolved a bit since this type of game ruled the world."

Jason D'Aprile of X-Play gave the Xbox version two stars out of five, calling it "the perfect example of a licensed game that focuses too much on visuals and marketing power, and not enough on gameplay. Even by side-scrolling basher standards, the gameplay here is weak and uninspired. The lack of complexity in the fighting system, combined with the lack of variation in the action itself leads to a game that, despite being gorgeous, is still a total snooze."

Edge gave the Xbox version a score of four out of ten, saying "Feels cheeky to be criticising a scrolling beat 'em up for being too shallow, but TMNT is possibly one of the most tedious ever. Repetition is only acceptable when you're repeating something gratifying."
