= Teeny Mutant Ninja Turtles =

American animated web series

- Genre: Science fiction; Superhero; Preschool
- Based on: Characters created by Peter Laird and Kevin Eastman
- Developed by: Max Beaudry; Francisco Paredes
- Directed by: Sarah Johnson
- Country of origin: United States
- Original language: English

Production
- Running time: 3–4 minutes
- Production company: Nickelodeon Animation Studio

Original release
- Network: YouTube
- Release: July 24, 2026 – present

Teeny Mutant Ninja Turtles is an American animated web series developed by Max Beaudry and Francisco Paredes for YouTube. Based on the Teenage Mutant Ninja Turtles characters created by Peter Laird and Kevin Eastman, the series reimagines and follows the childhood years of the four Turtles, and is the first in the franchise to be targeted at young audiences.

The series was announced in February 2026, with an order of 30, four-minute episodes. Teeny Mutant Ninja Turtles debuted on the Nick Jr. YouTube channel on July 24, 2026.

== Premise ==
The series follows the four turtle brothers—Leo, Raph, Donnie and Mikey—during their childhood years as ninjas in training. They are joined by their friend, April, and face enemies such as Karai and Bebop and Rocksteady.

== Production ==
In February 2026, it was reported that Paramount had greenlit, Teeny Mutant Ninja Turtles, a 30-episode CG-animated series of 4-minute shorts that would be released later that year on YouTube. Produced by Nickelodeon Digital Studio, the series was described as being similar to Disney Jr.'s Spidey and his Amazing Friends, and would follow the four Turtles during their childhood years and early ninja training.

Eliza Hart, VP of Preschool Development at Nickelodeon Animation and her team bounced around the idea of a Teenage Mutant Ninja Turtles show directed at preschoolers for years. The series was conceived and pitched of as a traditional 11-minute animated series but was later reworked as a series of shorts for Nick Jr.'s Youtube channels with the possibility of full-length special episodes in the future. Max Beaudry, Francisco Paredes, and Sarah Johnson were brought on as creative leads on the project and developed it further. Beaudry and Paredes are credited as co-developers.

Several changes were made to the franchise's iconography to make it more appealing to a younger target audience. This includes making humans and mutants live side-by-side from the jump, the Turtles living in a traditional dojo rather than in the sewers, and a more colorful and less grungy aesthetic.

== Episodes ==
No.	Title	Original release date
1	"Pizza Monster"	July 24, 2026
Donnie's latest experiment lets loose a giant pizza monster into the city, and it is up to the Ninja Turtles to stop it.
2	"Grand Theft Pizza"	July 25, 2026
Bebop and Rocksteady have stolen everyone's pizza, and it's up to the Turtles to get them back.
3	"April's Runaway Skyflyer"	July 31, 2026
The Turtles' best friend April O'Neil's skyflyer has gone haywire, and it's up to the turtles to take it down.
4	"The Haunted Dojo"	August 1, 2026
When strange things start to happen at the dojo, the Turtles team up with April to discover what's really going on.
5	"The Oozified Boombox"	August 14, 2026
The Turtles have their hands full with both Bebop and Rocksteady's dance battle challenge and an oozified boombox turning up the heat.
6	"Burp City"	August 21, 2026
Donnie's latest experiment has worked too well when Raphael starts floating away after drinking it, forcing the other Turtles to try and help him back down.
7	"Mustache Menaces"	August 28, 2026
Bebop and Rocksteady are covering the entirety of New York City with mustaches, and the Turtles won't stand for this act of vandalism.
8	"The Flying Puppy"	September 11, 2026
On the windiest day in New York City, a doghouse is being dragged away by dangerously strong air currents, along with a puppy named Maddie trapped inside, forcing the Turtles to risk getting blown away as well trying to get Maddie back on the ground.
9	"Ninja vs. Ninja"	September 18, 2026
Leonardo and Raphael compete to see who the best ninja is!
10	"Lights Out"	September 25, 2026
Enter Karai, niece of the Foot Clan leader Shredder, who goes on a rampage with the mystical Lightning Sword to steal all the light in New York City, and the Turtles cannot allow that punk rocker of a ninja to leave their hometown in the dark forever.
11	"The Ninja Wand"	October 9, 2026
Karai returns to steal candy from other people with her newest gadget, the magical Ninja Wand, but the Turtles will not allow her to ruin Halloween.
12	"Hot Dog Hotshots"	October 16, 2026
When a hot dog cart speeds out of control, taking a hungry Bebop and Rocksteady with it, the Turtles must settle their differences with these bullies to try and slow it down.
13	"The Last Slice"	October 23, 2026
Which Turtle will get the last slice of pizza before it gets cold?
14	"Cowabunga Carlos"	November 6, 2026
Mikey's accident in the bathroom of the Turtles' home leads them on a wild goose chase from down the toilet to get his favorite action figure Cowabunga Carlos back.
15	"Ninja Basketball"	November 13, 2026
The Turtles bite off more than they bargained for when Karai and her Foot Clan goons challenge them to a basketball match.
16	"Here's Shelldon"	November 20, 2026
Karai makes off with Donatello's latest invention: Shelldon!
17	"A Turtley Christmas"	December 4, 2026
18	"Mutant Sports Bag"	December 11, 2026
19	"Museum Mayhem"	December 18, 2026
20	"Doofy Dash"	January 2, 2027

== Release ==
Teeny Mutant Ninja Turtles debuted on the Nick Jr. YouTube channel on July 24, 2026.
