= List of Ninja Turtles: The Next Mutation characters =

This is a list of characters who appeared on the Ninja Turtles: The Next Mutation series. Many villains who appeared in prior TMNT works are omitted.

== Main characters ==
=== Leonardo ===
Leonardo (performed by Gabe Khouth and Shishir Inocalla, voiced by Michael Dobson) is the teal masked leader of the team.

=== Raphael ===
Raphael (performed by Mitchell A. Lee Yuen and Dean Choe, voiced by Matt Hill) is the red masked hothead.

=== Donatello ===
Donatello (performed by Richard Yee and David Soo, voiced by Jason Gray-Stanford) is the team's tech support who wears a violet mask.

=== Michelangelo ===
Michelangelo (performed by Jarred Blancard and Larry Lam, voiced by Kirby Morrow) is the team's comedic relief. He sports an orange mask.

=== Venus de Milo ===
Venus de Milo (performed by Nicole Parker and Leslie Sponberg, voiced by Lalainia Lindbjerg) is the female turtle introduced for the series. She serves as a love interest for the four brothers. She wears a cyan mask.

== Allies ==
=== Splinter ===
Splinter is a mutant rat who is the sensei/adoptive father of the Teenage Mutant Ninja Turtles.

=== Chung I ===
Chung I (portrayed by Tseng Chang, voiced by Dale Wilson) is an old friend of Splinter and the foster father of Venus. He trained Venus in the shinobi arts. Chung I was later killed by Dragon Lord who used him as a conduit to free the Rank from their prison dimension.

Chung I was also revealed to be an old enemy of the evil Chinese vampire Vam Mi.

== Villains ==
=== The Rank ===
The Rank are a group of dragons who were imprisoned in an enchanted glass thousands of years ago and were trapped until they were able to use the Realm of Dreams to capture Master Splinter while Dragon Lord blew a fireball through the enchanted glass which killed Chung I after telling him his "services were no longer required." They then used the turtles and Splinter to cross over to the material plain where they briefly fought the turtles until the turtles retreated. They then took up residence in a building outside of New York City.

They are briefly shown to be fans of the Sewer Hour which is a pirate radio Michelangelo hosts. The Rank are also terrified of remote controlled airplanes, apes, and shinobi magic.

==== Dragon Lord ====
Dragon Lord (portrayed by Gerald Wong, voiced by Christopher Gaze) is the leader of the Rank and one of the main antagonists of the series. Dragon Lord was the first evil dragon, and his charisma lead to other dragons joining him, thus resulting in the banishment of his entire race. He has the attitude of a tyrant but also lacks knowledge of modern technology and culture as he doesn't know a radio or clones are. He is shown to spare Wick when he fails tasks or when he was briefly King Wick, but still shows no mercy for traitors or failure.

Dragon Lord does have a Genghis Khan-type look with a ponytail and a red coat. His main goal is to eat the turtles which he believes will mutate him into an "all-powerful dragon deity". The main thing that shines out of his cruel personality is his common sense of humor and quick time reactions.

==== Wick ====
Wick (portrayed by Adam Behr and Bill Terezakis, voiced by Lee Tockar) is Dragon Lord's sidekick. He is shown to be constantly cocky and does not fight although he briefly had the abilities to shoot lasers from his eyes and he bites Mikey's leg when he is captured. He tends to clash with Dragon Lord over certain matters and ends up crying if Dragon Lord shouts or hits him.

His accent is briefly changed to a deep, echo British accent when he drinks a magic potion meant to cure a migraine Dragon Lord had.

==== Rank Lieutenant ====
Rank Lieutenant (portrayed by Andrew Kavadas) is the head of Dragon Lord's army. He is distinguished from the other by his violet hood. He tends to constantly lead missions and ends up failing either with the turtles defeating them, an ape chasing them or flying remote controlled airplanes attacking him and the Rank.

He briefly stood up against Wick who became King Wick and refused to call Dragon Lord, Weenie. He was, however, blasted into a frame by King Wick and started referring to Dragon Lord along with the rest of the Rank and Wick as Weenie.

=== Dr. Cornelius Quease ===
Dr. Cornelius Quease (portrayed by Simon Webb) is a world-renowned scientist with discolored skin who was kidnapped by Dragon Lord to help him capture and kill the turtles, but he developed a friendship with Donatello who tends to stop Quease from doing anything. He has a rocky relationship with the Rank and Dragon Lord as he tends to fail at capturing the turtles and this angers Dragon Lord. He does not like Wick as he gets on his nerves and wants to eat Quease.

He is also quite insane, and an egomaniac. The Dragon Lord refers to him as a "master of the new magic" AKA science. After siding with Dragon Lord, Quease adds a yellow labcoat to his outfit, along with red gloves.

=== Simon Bonesteel ===
Simon Bonesteel (portrayed by Scott McNeil) is a big-game hunter who is constantly hunting the turtles. He is shown to be quite tactical and give his weapons female names (i.e. Susanna the Whip, MaryLou the Crossbow, etc.). He tends to talk to himself and is very dangerous when he knows what his task is. He considers the turtles endangered species as well since there are only five of them. According to Donatello, he has identified Bonesteel as having a paranoid, anti-social personality, he even talks to his weapons, and can be tricked with enough word play. In the "Unchain My Heart" 4-parter, it's revealed that he's also a vampire hunter.

=== Silver ===
Silver (portrayed by Garry Chalk) is last of the Yetis in the Himalayas. Instead of living on top of the mountain, he makes his life by going into the crime business and starting a gang of humans who think of him as the smartest boss around. He can't spell, but is otherwise more sophisticated than his moronic henchmen. He first encounters Michelangelo in the sewers and is very strict when Mikey mentions he will tell the others. He briefly brainwashes Donatello to steal for him which he does until Raphael and Silver accidentally say his hypnosis word, banana too many times at once which briefly confuses Donnie but then Donnie stuffs a banana in Silvers mouth and they retreat while Silver is livid.

=== The UnKnowables ===
Heavy Duke (portrayed by Travis MacDonald) is the leader of the UnKnowables who crash a party in their 8th street neighborhood. In a sense of comedy, when they steal a boombox, the owner earned their anger by asking who they were; the joke being well... maybe that's why no-one's heard of you. Upon hearing that Mikey has holding a rave in their neighborhood, Heavy Duke decided to crash it and steal the Animal Rights donatation. Adding onto the comedy, his group constantly got in Bonesteel's way of capturing the Turtles. Tricked by Bonesteel, Heavy Duke attempted to capture the Turtles for the cash the hunter promised would come for them. The gang are quickly beaten by the turtles.

=== Vam-Mi ===
Vam-Mi (portrayed by Kira Clavell, voiced by Saffron Henderson) is a 10,000-year-old female vampire from China. She was previously defeated by Chung I who tore out her heart, plunging her into a long sleep. Her henchmen Bing and Chi Chu used a magic potion to awaken her; however, it was a blunder on Chi Chu's part out of missing her, since unless Vam-Mi's heart was returned within 96 hours, she would turn into sludge and never be awoken again. The Turtles used Vam-Mi's link to her heart to lure her into a trap, where they reduced her to dust with sunlight. Chi Chu and Bing collected the ashes, but decided against reviving her again.

==== Bing ====
Bing (portrayed by Justin Soon, voiced by Colin Musback) is a male vampire and one of Vam-Mi's henchmen. He appears to be the age of a child.

==== Chi Chu ====
Chi Chu (portrayed by Lauren Attadia, voiced by Sherry Thorson) is a female vampire and one of Vam-Mi's assistant. She appears to be the age of a child.
