= Teenage Mutant Ninja Turtles 3: Mutant Nightmare =

2005 video game

- North American cover art
- Developer: Konami Computer Entertainment Studios
- Publisher: Konami Digital Entertainment
- Directors: Yasushi Fujisawa; Hideyuki Tsujimoto
- Producers: Hirotaka Ishikawa; Yasushi Kawasaki; Yasuo Daikai
- Designers: Takayuki Ide; Akihiro Ishihara
- Composers: Yuichi Tsuchiya; Masanori Akita
- Series: Teenage Mutant Ninja Turtles
- Platforms: GameCube, PlayStation 2, Xbox, Nintendo DS
- Release: NA: November 1, 2005; PAL: November 24, 2005 (DS); PAL: April 13, 2006 (PS2/Xbox)
- Genre: Action
- Modes: Single-player, multiplayer

Teenage Mutant Ninja Turtles 3: Mutant Nightmare is a video game published by Konami for the PlayStation 2, GameCube, Xbox, and Nintendo DS, based on the 2003 Teenage Mutant Ninja Turtles TV series.

The game is divided into four sections, called "Episodes" (one is unlocked at the third Episode's conclusion): Space Invaders, dealing with the third season opening arcs Space Invaders and Worlds Collide; Bishop's Gambit, based on both the eponymous episode of the third season, and featuring antagonists from two other episodes; Exodus, detailing the events of New Blood and the Exodus two-parter; and The Nightmare, based on the five episodes in which Ultimate Drako separated the Turtles and Splinter across different dimensions.

After competing episode 1 in Teenage Mutant Ninja Turtles: 3 Mutant Nightmare, the player will unlock a slightly altered version of the arcade game, Teenage Mutant Ninja Turtles: Turtles in Time, which is a 1991 TMNT game also developed by Konami.

== Plot ==
In Episode 1, the Triceraton Republic led by Prime Leader Zanramon invades Earth in search of Professor Honeycutt, also known as the Fugitoid. After destroying three carriers deploying the Triceraton army, the Turtles go venture aboard the Triceraton homeworld to rescue their abducted friends Casey Jones and April O'Neil. Leo, Raph, Mikey and Don team up with Honeycutt, who arrives to help, and Triceraton rebellion leader Traximus and his army. After saving Casey and April, Honeycutt cripples the Triceraton military with a virus and the group goes to confront Zanramon, who pilots a giant robot to battle the heroes. Zanramon perishes in the battle, and Traximus declares the end of the Triceraton-Federation War and a new era of peace free from Zanramon's tyranny.

In Episode 2, the Turtles' lair is infiltrated by devices causing intense pain to the ears of Master Splinter. While evacuating him to the surface, the Turtles are attacked by two hitmen, Touch and Go, and lose their sensei to armed forces commanded by black ops Agent John Bishop, leader of the Earth Protection Force. Upon infiltrating Bishop's base, the Turtles learn Bishop seeks to create an army of supersoldiers to combat alien threats that will decimate the human population. After defeating Bishop's prized Slayer soldier, the Turtles and Splinter escape but muse that they will likely encounter Bishop again.

In Episode 3, the Turtles learn that Oroku Saki, the human identity of Shredder, is salvaging alien technology from the recent invasion for an unknown purpose. After Splinter has a vision of the future, the Turtles learn that Shredder has constructed a starship to return to the stars, conquer the Utroms, and renew his campaign of terror across the galaxy as a warlord. The Turtles and Splinter battle stow away aboard the Shredder's starship and confront the Shredder and Karai. The heroes resolve to destroy the power core of the starship, killing them along with the Shredder, but the Utroms arrive in the nick of time to save them and capture the Shredder. The Utroms deliver justice to the Shredder and sentence him to eternal exile on a distant ice asteroid, with the Turtles and Splinter triumphant.

In the Nightmare chapter, the Turtles and Splinter come under attack by Ultimate Drako, a fusion of Ue-Sama, the Ultimate Ninja, and Drako, who uses Lord Simultaneous's Time Scepter to send them across the multiverse. The Turtles go through a world where they are superheroes and Splinter is their fallen arch-nemesis, a world inhabited by Planet Racers, a timeline where the Shredder has ruled over Earth as a despot for thirty years, and a dungeon where they encounter visions of their past foes. The Turtles return to their lair to confront and defeat Ultimate Drako in a final battle, after which they finally return to their home timeline.

== Reception ==
Reception

Aggregate score
Aggregator	Score			
Aggregator	DS	GameCube	PS2	Xbox
Metacritic	58/100	57/100	53/100	56/100

Review scores
Publication	Score			
Publication	DS	GameCube	PS2	Xbox
Game Informer	4/10	N/A	N/A	N/A
GameSpot	6.1/10	5.3/10	5.3/10	5.3/10
GameSpy	2/5	2.5/5	2.5/5	2.5/5
GameZone	6/10	N/A	5.6/10	5.5/10
IGN	6/10	5.5/10	5.5/10	5.5/10
Jeuxvideo.com	10/20	N/A	N/A	N/A
Nintendo Power	6/10	4/10	N/A	N/A
Official U.S. PlayStation Magazine	N/A	N/A	2/5	N/A
Official Xbox Magazine (US)	N/A	N/A	N/A	4/10
TeamXbox	N/A	N/A	N/A	6.3/10

The game received "mixed" reviews on all platforms according to the review aggregation website Metacritic.

=== Sales ===
The game sold 1.5 million units by 2007.
