= Teenage Mutant Ninja Turtles (GBA video game) =

2003 video game

- North American cover art
- Developer: Konami
- Publisher: Konami
- Series: Teenage Mutant Ninja Turtles
- Platform: Game Boy Advance
- Release: NA: October 21, 2003; EU: November 21, 2003
- Genre: Beat 'em up
- Mode: Single player

Teenage Mutant Ninja Turtles is a 2003 beat 'em up game developed and published by Konami for the Game Boy Advance, and based on the 2003 TV series. In this game, each turtle has his own unique set of levels to complete. In addition to the traditional side-scrolling levels, there are third-person view races, a shell-glider level for Donatello and a bike race between Raphael and Casey Jones. The game was also issued in a double pack with its sequel Teenage Mutant Ninja Turtles 2: Battle Nexus.

== Gameplay ==
Teenage Mutant Ninja Turtles is a regular beat 'em up platform game. After the player chooses one of the Ninja Turtles, each of whom has a special ability, the character enters a set of four acts, one of which is a vehicle-riding minigame. Leonardo can crawl through small spaces and rides the hovercraft Sewer Slider for a rail shooter minigame. Michelangelo can wall jump, and rides a skateboard through the sewers. Donatello climbs pipes and has a shoot 'em up level using a hang glider. Raphael uses his sai to climb walls and has a motorcycle racing minigame riding the Shell Cycle against Casey Jones.

== Plot ==
Shortly after a group of mouser robots destroy the Turtles' old home, they begin to attack their new home. Eventually the Turtles trace the robots back to Baxter Stockman's factory, where they save young April O'Neil. Afterwards Michelangelo gets on Raphael's nerves, making Raphael leave to the surface. At the surface, he is confronted by Purple Dragon thugs, and meets Casey Jones, who equally hates that gang. Afterwards Stockman develops for the Foot Clan invisible foot tech ninjas to capture Raphael, forcing the Turtles to rescue him and Donatello to use a cloaking device detector to properly fight the invisible ninjas. Afterward, they are confronted by genetically mutated beings.

Once all four levels are completed, the Turtles strike on the Foot headquarters, where they fight Hun before going after the Foot leader, The Shredder.

== Critical reception ==
Reception

Aggregate score
Aggregator	Score
Metacritic	71/100

Review scores
Publication	Score
Electronic Gaming Monthly	5.33/10 (Note: Three critics of Electronic Gaming Monthly gave the game each a score of 7.5/10, 3.5/10, and 5/10.)
Game Informer	7.25/10
GameSpot	5.7/10
GameSpy	3/5
IGN	6.9/10
Jeuxvideo.com	10/20
Joypad	6/10
Nintendo Power	4/5

The GBA version received "mixed or average reviews" according to the review aggregation website Metacritic. The graphics and minigames were complimented, but the gameplay was found repetitive and complaints were raised against the lack of multiplayer. Four-Eyed Dragon of GamePro said, "The only drawback to this nostalgic experience is the lack of any multiplayer options. As everyone knows, the Turtles work best together as a team, not as individuals—unfortunately, though, this TMNT allows action only one Turtle at a time. Still, the popularity of these mutant amphibians is hard to pass up, especially if you crave instant brainless brawling for your GBA." (Note: GamePro gave the game two 4/5 scores for graphics and fun factor, 3.5/5 for sound, and 4.5/5 for control.)
