= Teenage Mutant Ninja Turtles (2003 TV series) season 7 =

TMNT: Back to the Sewer
- Season 7
- No. of episodes: 13

Release
- Original network: The CW4Kids
- Original release: September 13, 2008 – February 28, 2009

Season chronology
- ← Previous; Season 6

The seventh and final season of Teenage Mutant Ninja Turtles, titled Back to the Sewer or TMNT: Back to the Sewer, aired on Saturday mornings on the CW4Kids on CW Network in 2008–2009. With this season, the show moved from Fox's 4Kids TV lineup to the CW. The season began with the episode "Tempus Fugit" which aired on September 13, 2008. It is followed by the TV movie Turtles Forever.

== Story ==
Cody Jones is able to finally repair the Time Window, allowing the Turtles and Splinter to return to the 21st century. However, Viral, who had survived her defeat in the previous season, hacks into the time window, taking control of it and sending the Turtles, Splinter, and Serling (who accidentally fell in) to various eras in an attempt to kill them. Just as the group is able to return home, Viral attacks Splinter, shattering him into countless bytes of data scattered across the Internet. Serling and the Turtles resolve to recover Splinter's bytes and return him to his whole self by digitizing themselves and entering cyberspace to find them.

Viral is forcibly assimilated into a digital copy of Ch'rell, who had done so prior to his attempted departure from Earth in the 3rd-season finale. This forms a new incarnation of the Shredder known as the "Cyber Shredder," who employs a new Foot Clan with Khan as his first lieutenant. Shredder makes several attempts to escape from cyberspace and enter the real world, often harassing the Turtles during their attempts to locate Splinter's data.

In the season's finale, Splinter is recompiled and returned to his adopted sons, who decide to celebrate April and Casey's wedding. Dozens of the Turtles' closest allies attend the ceremony- Angel, Usagi, Leatherhead, Karai, Dr. Chaplain- which is violently attacked by the Foot Clan, led by the Shredder, who has finally entered the physical world. In the midst of a massive battle between the Turtles' allies and the Foot, Donatello is able to destroy the Shredder. The wedding finally ends, in front of the Turtles, Splinter, and many other allies. Additionally, the Rat King and Renet watch from a distance, whereas the Daimyo, the Ultimate Ninja, Agent Bishop, and Cody observe the wedding through either technological or magical means.

== Voice cast ==
=== Main ===
- Michael Sinterniklaas as Leonardo: the leader of the Turtles who wields dual katana and wears a blue mask. He who helped his brothers to find Splinter's data bits after Viral blasted him apart into Cyberspace. (12 episodes)
- Sam Riegel as Donatello: a genius engineer who wields a bo staff and wears a purple mask. He who blamed himself for Splinter's decompiling, up until "Hacking Stockman" and vowed to restore his bits from Cyberspace. (12 episodes)
- Frank Frankson as Raphael: the Turtles' most temperamental and stubborn member who wields twin sai and wears a red mask. (13 episodes)
- Wayne Grayson as Michelangelo: the Turtles' wise guy and a source of comic relief who wields dual nunchaku and wears an orange mask. He becomes a member of the Justice Force as the "Turtle Titan". (13 episodes)

=== Supporting ===
- Veronica Taylor as April: the Turtles' ally who enters a relationship with Casey.
- Marc Thompson as
  - Casey: the Ninja Turtles' ally who enters a relationship with April and ultimately marries her.
  - Serling: Cody's robot servant who becomes constantly infuriated by the Ninja Turtles.

=== Villains ===
- Scottie Ray as Ch'rell / the Cyber Shredder: a new virtual incarnation of Ch'rell as a last resort.
- Sean Schemmel as Master Khan: a second in command of the Foot Clan who apparently comes from the ranks of the Foot Elite, the personal bodyguard of the Cyber Shredder who is based on the Utrom Shredder.
- Greg Carey as Hun: a hulking gangster and the leader of the Purple Dragons.

=== Recurring ===
- Darren Dunstan as Splinter: the Turtles' sensei and adopted father who deleted by Viral and sent across Cyberspace.
- Eva Kaminsky as Viral: a computerized system and a formal ally of the late Sh'Okonabo, who later fuses with Ch'rell's backup memory to become the Cyber Shredder.
- Christopher C. Adams as Cody: a descendant of April and Casey, who lives in 2105 and helps the turtles survive in the future.

== Development ==
Following their intentions to return the characters to the present day and adapt a tone similar to the recent TMNT movie, 4Kids pitched a revamp of the series to Peter Laird codenamed "Superworld." The initial proposal was given the 'thumbs down' by Laird. Following this was a second proposal called TMNT Overload, which was approved by Mirage, but rejected by Playmates Toys, who then proposed their own idea, only to have that be rejected by 4Kids and Mirage.

On October 24, 2007, Steve Murphy confirmed on his blog that Playmates, Mirage, and 4Kids had firmly agreed on the new direction, which will take place in the continuity of the 2003 series and use the "more realistic aspects" of the aborted "Overload" pitch, with character designs similar to that of the 2007 TMNT movie.

Its description was as follows:

The Teenage Mutant Ninja Turtles are back in New York, ready to race across the rooftops and take on all challengers!

Not only are Casey and April back and ready to bust some bad guy butt, but a brand new, super advanced Turtle Lair is under construction (thanks to some hi-tech know-how Donatello garnered from the future), and of course there are all sorts of new heavy duty Turtle vehicles gearing up to roar down the streets of NYC and give the Foot a taste of some serious Turtle.

The stakes have never been higher, their enemies have never been stronger... and if the Turtles are going to be triumphant they'll need to work together in ways they never have before.

Further info was revealed in December 2007:

When the Turtles return from the future to their present time, Viral interferes causing Master Splinter to get trapped in cyberspace, bits of his data code scattered all throughout the digital domain. The Turtles must find a way to access the virtual realm so they can gather Splinter’s code and save their beloved father before he is lost to them forever. And what good is a digital realm without a super bad guy! That's right; the Shredder is back in new form. In order to save their master, the Turtles must now face. The Cyber Shredder! Now the Turtles must fight on two fronts - cyberspace and the real world. And twice the locations, means twice the bad guys. That's right; the TMNT will be facing off against Hun, the Foot, Baxter Stockman, and some dangerous digital monsters! Get ready, because the Turtles are back from the future, back in action, and back to the sewers!

Three samples of a new opening theme song were announced by 4Kids to be under consideration on February 22, 2008, with the option for fans to vote on each of the samples and determine an official opening theme song. Six pitches for the theme song were released on February 29, 2008 most confirming that the Shredder will return in some form. Much of the theme lyrics identify him as "Cyber-Shredder." A trailer was released on August 8, 2008. On September 6, 2008, a sneak peek of the season's opening episode was featured on 4Kids official website.

== Episodes ==
| No. overall | No. in season | Title | Directed by | Written by | Original release date | Prod. code | K6–11 rating/share |
|---|---|---|---|---|---|---|---|
| 143 | 1 | "Tempus Fugit" | Roy Burdine | Eric Basart | September 13, 2008 | 144 | 1.1/4 |
When the Time Window is finally repaired, the Turtles and Splinter enter it to return to the 21st Century. However, Viral, who had survived being decompiled by Cody Jones, has hijacked the Time Window and dragged Serling with the others. With Viral in control of the time portal, the Turtles, Splinter, and Serling travel to different points in history and survive whatever Viral throws at them while trying to successfully return to their time, up to including a turf war between three different Foot Clans.
| 144 | 2 | "Karate Schooled" | Roy Burdine | Michael Ryan | September 20, 2008 | 145 | 1.1/5 |
Despite Splinter having been scattered into data bits by Viral using Serling's Decompiler, the Turtles are reunited with Casey Jones and April O'Neil, who inform them that they have been missing for an entire year. As everyone tries adjusting back to the lower-tech era, Donatello begins construction on a device to enter cyberspace to retrieve Splinter's data bits. Meanwhile, Leo, Raph, and Mikey discover that Casey has been attending a martial arts headed headed by Khan, a devoted elite-ranking operative of the Utrom Shredder seeking to rebuild the Foot.
| 145 | 3 | "Something Wicked" | Roy Burdine | Michael Ryan | September 27, 2008 | 146 | N/A |
The Turtles journey into cyberspace to save as much of Splinter as they can find, using the new Cybernaut armor and weapons designed by Donnie. However, there is a major obstacle in their way: the Cyber-Shredder, a digital copy of the Utrom Shredder accidentally activated by Viral. And he has no intention of letting his most hated foes return home to the real world.
| 146 | 4 | "The Engagement Ring" | Roy Burdine | Robert David | October 4, 2008 | 147 | N/A |
As the Purple Dragons are after a magical ring that can summon monsters as a precaution against the Cyber-Shredder, Casey and Raph head to Chinatown to find an engagement ring for April. However, the store owner gives the magical ring to Casey. The ring causes the evil within April to grow until she turns into a monster.
| 147 | 5 | "Hacking Stockman" | Roy Burdine | Joe Kelly | October 18, 2008 | 148 | 1.2/5 |
While Donnie focuses on collecting Splinter's data bits, his brothers find themselves pulled into a war between the Foot and the Purple Dragons. In retaliation against the Purple Dragons, Cyber-Shredder possesses Baxter Stockman's robotic body. Stockman begrudgingly aids the Turtles in stopping Cyber-Shredder and must contact Donnie while he is still intact.
| 148 | 6 | "Incredible Shrinking Serling" | Roy Burdine | Robert David | October 25, 2008 | 149 | 1.4/6 |
Sick of being in a primitive era, Serling arranges for each of the Turtles to spend the evening doing something they like while he constructs a Time Window. However, he accidentally shrinks him to the size of a toy and is sent to when the Turtles were toddlers before being kidnapped by a rich toy mogul intent on possessing such an amazing "toy". The Turtle Tots must rescue Serling before he gets disassembled.: Note: This episode is a repurposing of an unproduced episode of Fast Forward.
| 149 | 7 | "Identity Crisis" | Roy Burdine | Michael Ryan | November 1, 2008 | 150 | 0.9/4 |
Cyber-Shredder unleashes a virus that wipes the Turtles' memories, reprogramming them so that they work for the Foot. With the Turtles doing Khan's bidding, April, Casey, and Serling must restore their memories.
| 150 | 8 | "Web Wranglers" | Roy Burdine | Robert David | November 8, 2008 | 151 | 1.2/5 |
Cyber-Shredder creates a prototype cyber-mat portal to escape cyberspace and sends animals through as test subjects. However, they mutate and attack New York City, leaving the Turtles to clean up the mess and stop the Shredder from becoming real once again.
| 151 | 9 | "SuperQuest" | Roy Burdine | Robert David | November 15, 2008 | 152 | 1.0/4 |
The Turtles enter Superquest, Mikey's favorite online game, to retrieve Splinter's data bits. Limited to Superquest's rules and character abilities, the Turtles must learn to use their characters' powers to unlock the chest holding a cluster of data bits. Amusingly, they are assisted by the Elfinator, a character controlled by an unknowing Hun.
| 152 | 10 | "Virtual Reality Check" | Roy Burdine | Michael Ryan | November 22, 2008 | 153 | 1.1/5 |
As Donnie repairs the cyber-mat portal after it received damage, the other Turtles experience a strange series of events suggesting that they are still in cyberspace. When they try to warn Donnie, Cyber-Shredder attempts to buy Khan and the Foot time to construct a perfected cyber-mat portal of their own.
| 153 | 11 | "City Under Siege" | Roy Burdine | Steve Melching | November 29, 2008 | 154 | N/A |
Having escaped to the real world, Cyber-Shredder hacks into New York's power grid and takes control of every electronic device in the city, effectively conquering it. The Turtles, April, and Casey battle through New York to restore the power grid and stop the Cyber-Shredder.
| 154 | 12 | "Super Power Struggle" | Roy Burdine | Robert David | February 21, 2009 | 155 | 1.2/4 |
Mikey resumes his role as Turtle Titan, finding a green cape belonging to the Green Mantle after a battle. When he forces Raph to don it as a sidekick, Mikey is surprised that it grants him superpowers, impressing the Justice Force enough to invite Raph to join. Dr. Malignus tries to get the cape for his own villainous designs.
| 155 | 13 | "Wedding Bells and Bytes" | Roy Burdine | Matthew Drdek & Robert David | February 28, 2009 | 156 | 1.3/5 |
Having collected all of Splinter's data bits, the Turtles reconstruct him in reality in time to attend April and Casey's wedding. However, Cyber-Shedder has returned and placed a bug in Splinter's data bits, allowing the Foot to track the Turtles to April's farm and crash the wedding. Luckily aided by a host of familiar faces from different worlds, dimensions, and eras, the Turtles must formulate a plan to vanquish the Cyber-Shredder once and for all.

=== "Mayhem from Mutant Island" shorts ===
Starting on March 7, 2009, a series of 13 shorts, called "chapters", ranging from 90 seconds to two minutes in length, began airing on The CW4Kids during episodes of TMNT: Back to the Sewer and Chaotic: M'arrillian Invasion. They were streamed on the 4Kids website a week in advance of airing them on television. The episodes comprise a single story called "Mayhem from Mutant Island." On March 27, 2010, the 13 shorts were re-aired and compiled as the single episode "Mayhem from Mutant Island", airing as an extra, fourteenth episode of the season.

| No. | Title | Original release date |
|---|---|---|
| 1 | "Chapter 1: What Lurks Beneath!" | March 7, 2009 |
While riding around with their sports gear, the Turtles are attacked by a giant crustacean-type monster that emerges from the sewers.
| 2 | "Chapter 2: Terror Unleashed!" | March 7, 2009 |
The Turtles overcome the monster, only to fall into the sewer. Upon landing, a large group of mutants attacks.
| 3 | "Chapter 3: Trouble Runs Rampant!" | March 14, 2009 |
After narrowly escaping the mutants in the sewer, the Turtles don their Sub-Sewer Gear in order to combat them.
| 4 | "Chapter 4: Showdown in the Subterrane!" | March 21, 2009 |
The Turtles defeat the dinosaur mutants, only to subsequently discover they were right in front of a Purple Dragons stronghold.
| 5 | "Chapter 5: Attack of the Purple Dragons!" | March 28, 2009 |
The Turtles face off with Hun and the Purple Dragons, believing them to be responsible for the mutant dinosaurs. It is revealed, however, that Baxter Stockman is the true culprit.
| 6 | "Chapter 6: Face-Off with the Foot!" | April 4, 2009 |
After Hun tells the Turtles that Khan and the Foot Clan are behind the mutant attacks, the Turtles don new metal armor and forge new and even stronger weapons before storming their hideout.
| 7 | "Chapter 7: Rivals Take Arms" | April 11, 2009 |
Using their new-and-improved armor and weapons, the Turtles battle with Khan and the Foot Clan.
| 8 | "Chapter 8: Dread Returns!" | April 18, 2009 |
The Foot Clan backs off as a mutant T-rex enters the scene, grabbing Leo into its jaws.
| 9 | "Chapter 9: In Pursuit of Danger" | April 25, 2009 |
The Turtles chase after the mutant T-rex in the Hauler, but once Leo is freed, the Turtles find themselves facing an entire group of mutant dinosaurs.
| 10 | "Chapter 10: The Scourge Revealed!" | May 2, 2009 |
Using the Hauler, the Turtles take out as many of the mutant dinosaurs as they can, which causes the underground railway tunnel they are fighting in to collapse. Immediately after, they receive a message from Stockman.
| 11 | "Chapter 11: Rendezvous with Evil!" | May 9, 2009 |
The Turtles locate Stockman in their helicopter, but are struck out of the air by the mutant dinosaurs. The Turtles respond by donning their Mech Wrecker suits and engaging the mutant dinosaurs in battle.
| 12 | "Chapter 12: Stockman Strikes!" | May 16, 2009 |
As the Turtles battle with Stockman and the mutant dinosaurs, Don discovers that the dinosaurs are being controlled by a radio tower.
| 13 | "Chapter 13: Fate of the Deranged Dinos" | May 23, 2009 |
Don destroys the radio tower with his mech-suit, and the dinosaurs become docile. With that, the Turtles leave the island.
