= Teenage Mutant Ninja Turtles: Splintered Fate =

2023 video game

- Developer: Super Evil Megacorp
- Publisher: Super Evil Megacorp
- Director: Patrick O'Callahan
- Producers: Ana Waddington Bettencourt; Dana Peterson; Jonathan Muñoz; Tom Westall
- Designers: Daniel Stansens; George Liu
- Programmers: Andrew Payne; Brett Harris
- Artist: Chance Rowe
- Writers: Tom Waltz; Kevin Michael Johnson
- Composer: Chris Hülsbeck
- Series: Teenage Mutant Ninja Turtles
- Platforms: macOS; iOS; iPadOS; tvOS; Nintendo Switch; Windows; PlayStation 4; PlayStation 5; Xbox One; Xbox Series X/S; Nintendo Switch 2
- Release: macOS, iOS, iPadOS, tvOS: WW: May 4, 2023; Nintendo Switch: WW: July 17, 2024; Windows: WW: November 6, 2024; PlayStation 4, PlayStation 5: WW: May 20, 2025; Xbox One, Xbox Series X/S: WW: June 24, 2025; Nintendo Switch 2: WW: December 16, 2025
- Genres: Roguelike, brawler
- Modes: Single-player, multiplayer

Teenage Mutant Ninja Turtles: Splintered Fate is a 2023 roguelike brawler game developed and published by Super Evil Megacorp. Set in a distinct continuity partially inspired by the IDW Publishing Teenage Mutant Ninja Turtles comic book mythology, the main story follows the Turtles on a quest across New York City to save their master, Splinter, from the Shredder and his Foot Clan.

Players assume control of the four Turtles — Leonardo, Raphael, Donatello, and Michelangelo — and battle enemies through procedurally generated levels spread across various themed environments. The player can use collectibles gained during runs to upgrade and enhance their characters. The game supports single-player mode, and a four player local and online cooperative multiplayer mode.

Super Evil Megacorp chose to make Splintered Fate roguelike to differentiate it from previous Teenage Mutant Ninja Turtles outings. Influenced by roguelikes of the past, the team wanted to capture a "brawler arcade" feel, with an emphasis on cooperative gameplay, which they felt was rare in the genre. Tom Waltz, a writer and editor for the IDW comic series was brought in to consult on the game's writing.

Splintered Fate was announced and released for iOS, iPadOS, macOS and tvOS through Apple Arcade on May 4, 2023. It was later released for the Nintendo Switch on July 17, 2024 and for Windows on November 6, 2024. PlayStation 4 and PlayStation 5 versions were released on May 20 2025, with Xbox One and Xbox Series X/S versions debuting later on June 24, 2025. The game received generally favorable reviews from critics, with praise given to its combat, upgrade system, and progression, though some criticized its comparisons to Hades (2020).

== Gameplay ==
Teenage Mutant Ninja Turtles: Splintered Fate is presented in an isometric view, with the player controlling one of the four titular turtles as they battle enemies across New York City.

Teenage Mutant Ninja Turtles: Splintered Fate is a roguelike brawler with action role-playing game elements. The game is presented in an isometric view, with the player assuming control of one of the four Turtles — Leonardo, Raphael, Donatello, and Michelangelo. Leonardo is speed-based with low cooldowns, Michelangelo style centers on area-of-effect attacks, Raphael can chain combos, and Donatello focuses on gadgets with a much larger health pool. Combat is fast-paced, with each Turtle's skillset consisting of basic attacks, dodging, tools, and a unique special move that can be charged up.

Players play solo or team up in both local and online cooperative modes, supporting up to four individuals. Each player can select a different Turtle and the game features drop-in/drop-out functionality, allowing players to join or leave sessions. The game features a Story Mode, in which difficulty is significantly reduced for players to enjoy the game at a relaxed pace.

The game features procedurally generated levels spread across various themed environments in the Turtles universe, such as the city and sewers. Players progress through randomized room layouts and encounter various enemies, including mini-bosses that rearrange with each run. Several secrets and items are scattered across these settings. During runs, players collect resources such as Dragon and Dreamer Coins which operate as currency within the game's world. The game includes artifacts that provide additional powers and can be unlocked via completing events and tasks during runs. Players can return to the Turtles' lair, which serves as a central hub for upgrading and interactions. The Dragon and Dreamer Coins collected during runs can be spent here on enhancements such as improving stats like health, damage, and luck. Additionally, the lair provides opportunities to interact with allies such as April O'Neil. Casey Jones becomes a playable character through the Junkyard Jam downloadable content (DLC) expansion.

== Synopsis ==
=== Settings and characters ===
Teenage Mutant Ninja Turtles: Splintered Fate follows the four titular turtles — Leonardo (Dominic Catrambone), Raphael (Roger Craig Smith), Donatello (Dale Inghram), and Michelangelo (Yuri Lowenthal) — as they venture across New York City is search of their lost master and father, Splinter (Paul Nakauchi). Among the Turtles allies include their closest companion, April O'Neil (Melanie Minichino); Casey Jones (Ben Lepley), a hockey mask-wearing vigilante; Metalhead (also Inghram), the Turtles' robot assistant; Angel/Nobody (Dawn M. Bennett), a mechanical suit-sporting vigilante; and Slash (André Sogliuzzo), a mutant snapping turtle. The Turtles fight many antagonists during their journey, such as mutant alligator, Leatherhead (Keith Ferguson); the buffoonish mutant warthog and rhinoceros agents of the Foot Clan, Bebop and Rocksteady (Dave B. Mitchell and Fred Tatasciore); Karai (Gwendoline Yeo), the Shredder's granddaughter and the Foot's second in command; and the Shredder (Matthew Yang King), the archenemy of the Turtles, leader of the ninja criminal organisation, the Foot Clan, and the figure behind Splinter's kidnapping.

=== Premise ===
When Splinter is kidnapped by Shredder, mysterious portals simultaneously appear across NYC. With April and Metalhead analysing recovered artifacts for clues, the Turtles battle to recover their father from the clutches of the Foot Clan. However, as the gang gets ever closer to Splinter's otherworldly location, an even greater threat lingers in the shadows...

— Super Evil Megacorp

== Development ==
Splintered Fate was developed and published by San Mateo, California-based studio Super Evil Megacorp in partnership with Paramount Game Studios. According to lead gameplay designer, Daniel Stansens, the reason the team chose to go for a roguelike direction was to differentiate it from previous Teenage Mutant Ninja Turtles outings as well as to make use of Super Evil's custom engine, the EVIL Engine. They wanted to capture a "brawler arcade" feel to the title, which they felt was rare for roguelikes. Cooperative gameplay, both local and online, was added as per tradition for Turtles games. The game marks the development studio's first title for the Nintendo Switch and PC. The intent from the start was for Splintered Fate to be a cross-platform title that would first launch on Apple devices, before expanding to home consoles such as the Switch. Super Evil made special enhancements to each version of the game based on the platform of release. For example, for the Switch iteration they focused on couch co-op while for PC, they honed in on online matchmaking.

Stansens described the writing process of the game as tricky as a result of its roguelike structure. Tom Waltz, a writer and editor for the IDW Publishing Turtles comic book series, was brought in to aid Super Evil creative director, Kevin Michael Johnson, in this area. The writer's close connection to the franchise and fandom helped Super Evil craft their iteration. As a result, the universe of Splintered Fate takes inspiration from the IDW comics, though Stansens emphasized that they still sought to make their own version of the story. The game features a more adult version of the Turtles that are already cemented in New York City. The designer elaborated that they aimed for a tone not "as family-friendly and as light, as some of the Turtles origin stories" though nor as dark as the IDW comics. Stansens remarked being flattered by the game being frequently compared to Hades (2020) but also felt that Splintered Fate innovated with roguelike genre as well. He specifically highlighted the game letting the player progress the branching narrative as anyone of the brothers, while also letting you do it all in co-op. Super Evil's Director of Product Management, Tom Westall, said that "Hades particularly further opened our eyes to how roguelikes can tell epic stories that evolve over time" and pointed to Dead Cells (2018) and Slay the Spire (2019) as additional inspirations for the team. In addition, they were influenced by Children of Morta (2019), which they felt shared a lot of the familial themes intrinsic to Turtles.

== Marketing and release ==
Teenage Mutant Ninja Turtles: Splintered Fate was announced and released for iOS, iPadOS, macOS and tvOS through Apple Arcade on May 4, 2023. A one-shot tie-in comic was released by IDW Publishing as a digital preview alongside the Apple Arcade release, while an extended physical edition released on August 16, 2023. During Nintendo's Indie World Showcase in April 2024, a trailer debuted confirming that the game would be released for the Nintendo Switch in July 2024; it became available on July 17. In October 2024, it was announced that the game would release for Windows through Steam and the Epic Games Store on November 6, 2024. In January 2025, a downloadable content (DLC) expansion subtitled Casey Jones & The Junkyard Jam, was announced which would add Casey Jones to the game as a playable character. It was released on February 5, 2025. A second DLC expansion, released on February 25, 2026, added the mutant fox Alopex as a playable character alongside new artifacts and a free update introducing additional game modes and combat rooms.

In April 2025, it was announced that the game would release digitally on PlayStation 4 and PlayStation 5 on May 20 2025, and Xbox One and Xbox Series X/S later on June 24, 2025. Additionally, it was confirmed that special physical editions of the home console versions would be released on August 26, 2025. There is the Deluxe edition, which in addition to the base game, includes The Junkyard Jam DLC, reversible cover art, collector's cards, and another yet to be announced DLC expansion; and the Pipin' Hot Collector's edition which includes everything in the Deluxe edition as well as tabletop role-playing game dice, a dice box, a game manual and artbook, a comic book, posters, a pizza box and pizza box sleeve, and a special coin.

== Reception ==
Reception

Aggregate scores
Aggregator	Score
Metacritic	(NS) 79/100 (PC) 75/100
OpenCritic	74/100; 53% Critics Recommend

Review scores
Publication	Score
Game Informer	7.75/10
GameSpot	7/10
Nintendo Life	8/10
Nintendo World Report	8/10
PC Gamer (US)	83/100
RPGamer	3.5/5
RPGFan	75/100
Shacknews	8/10

According to the review aggregate website Metacritic, the PC version of Teenage Mutant Ninja Turtles: Splintered Fate received "generally favorable reviews", while the Nintendo Switch version received "mixed or average reviews".

Several critics compared the game to Hades (2020) in both a favorable and unfavorable light. Brian Shea of Game Informer wrote: "Imitation is the sincerest form of flattery, and Hades is a great game--though it does mean the areas where Splintered Fate falls short tend to stick out more. Game Informer commended the combat, saying that each attack felt "like an impactful part of a successful and fun strategy". Paul Shkreli of RPGamer and Abraham Kobylanski of RPGFan both referred to the combat as smooth. Justin Koreis of GameSpot opined that the combat was fluid, though often became "button-mashy". Robin Valentine of PC Gamer contrastively thought that the game avoided the common "uninteresting combat" pitfall seen in many roguelikes.

RPGamer called the game's presentation "snappy", saying that the art style was "evocative of many earlier iterations while also maintaining a unique identity". Jim Norman of Nintendo Life said that "the visual style gets the job done", if a bit "mobile-y". GameSpot felt that the art failed to live up to the standard set by the game's inspiration, Hades. Zachary Miller of Nintendo World Report echoed this sentiment, saying that "Splintered Fate looks great, if a little unambitious".

Lucas White of Shacknews commended the upgrade system for its variety, describing it as "extremely deep". Nintendo Life similarly praised the upgrade system as well as the difficulty curve, while RPGFan noted that each failed attempt still felt rewarding. PC Gamer positively remarked that the game was more welcoming as compared against other roguelikes. GameSpot directed criticism to the games technical issues, particularly the framerate drops during co-op. Nintendo Life similarly critiqued the performance dips and occasional crashes, with Nintendo World Report echoing this sentiment. RPGamer criticized the crashes in addition to the lengthy loading screens, saying in reference to the Switch version that "Splintered Fate doesn't seem particularly well-suited for the seven-year-old hardware".
