= List of Teenage Mutant Ninja Turtles video games =

Video games based on the Teenage Mutant Ninja Turtles franchise have been produced since 1989, largely by Japanese video game manufacturer Konami.

Earlier games were mostly based on the 1987 TV series, with elements borrowed from the movies, the Teenage Mutant Ninja Turtles Adventures, action figures and the original Mirage comic books and role-playing books. Several games released in the 2000s were based on the 2003 TV series and the 2007 film. A number of games released in the following decade have been based on the 2012 TV series, the 2014 film, and Rise of the Teenage Mutant Ninja Turtles.

As of 1993, the first eleven TMNT video games sold 18 million units worldwide, earning nearly $450 million in sales revenue.

== Standalone games ==
| Game | Details |
|---|---|
| Teenage Mutant Ninja Turtles Original release date(s): JP: May 12, 1989; NA: June 1989; EU: August 17, 1990 | Release years by system: 1989 – Nintendo Entertainment System; 1990 – Amiga, Amstrad CPC, Atari ST, Commodore 64, MS-DOS, MSX, and ZX Spectrum; 2007 – Wii Virtual Console (removed in 2012) |
| Teenage Mutant Ninja Turtles Original release date(s): JP: May 12, 1989; NA: June 1989; EU: August 17, 1990 | Notes: The first TMNT video game, an action-adventure game in which the player can switch between any of the four turtles at any time. The game involves overhead areas which the player must explore in order to enter the main side-scrolling portions. |
| Teenage Mutant Ninja Turtles Original release date(s): 1989 | Release years by system: 1989 – Arcade; 1990 – NES; 1991 – Amiga, Amstrad CPC, Atari ST, Commodore 64, MS-DOS and ZX Spectrum; 2007 – Xbox Live Arcade |
| Teenage Mutant Ninja Turtles Original release date(s): 1989 | Notes: A side-scrolling fighting action game. It was renamed Teenage Mutant Ninja Turtles II: The Arcade Game when released on the NES for continuity purposes on that console. |
| Teenage Mutant Ninja Turtles Original release date(s): 1989 | Release years by system: 1989 – Handheld electronic game |
| Teenage Mutant Ninja Turtles II: Splinter Speaks Original release date(s): 1990 | Release years by system: 1990 – Handheld electronic game |
| Teenage Mutant Ninja Turtles: Pizza Drop Original release date(s): 1990 | Release years by system: 1990 – Redemption game |
| Teenage Mutant Ninja Turtles: World Tour Original release date(s): 1990 | Release years by system: 1990 – Amiga, Amstrad CPC, Atari ST, Commodore 64, MS-DOS, and ZX Spectrum |
| Teenage Mutant Ninja Turtles: World Tour Original release date(s): 1990 | Notes: Part of a series of Electric Crayon coloring book games. |
| Teenage Mutant Ninja Turtles: Fall of the Foot Clan Original release date(s): 1990 | Release years by system: 1990 – Game Boy |
| Teenage Mutant Ninja Turtles: Fall of the Foot Clan Original release date(s): 1990 | Notes: The first TMNT game for a portable platform. A side-scrolling platform game featuring bonus stages. |
| Teenage Mutant Ninja Turtles: Manhattan Missions Original release date(s): 1991 | Release years by system: 1991 – MS-DOS |
| Teenage Mutant Ninja Turtles: Manhattan Missions Original release date(s): 1991 | Notes: Released exclusively for MS-DOS. The Turtles have a different "walk mode" and "fight mode", with different offensive and defensive moves in each. The game draws more heavily on elements from the Mirage comics than its contemporaries. |
| Teenage Mutant Ninja Turtles Original release date(s): 1991 | Release years by system: 1991 – Pinball |
| Teenage Mutant Ninja Turtles: Turtles in Time Original release date(s): 1991 | Release years by system: 1991 – Arcade; 1992 – Super Nintendo Entertainment System |
| Teenage Mutant Ninja Turtles: Turtles in Time Original release date(s): 1991 | Notes: This is the second TMNT arcade video game produced by Konami. It was a scrolling beat 'em up based on the 1987 TV series. It was ported to the SNES renamed Teenage Mutant Ninja Turtles IV: Turtles in Time for continuity purposes in 1992, becoming the first TMNT game for the SNES. |
| Teenage Mutant Ninja Turtles II: Back from the Sewers Original release date(s): 1991 | Release years by system: 1991 – Game Boy |
| Teenage Mutant Ninja Turtles II: Back from the Sewers Original release date(s): 1991 | Notes: This is the sequel to TMNT: Fall of the Foot Clan. Like the first Game Boy game, the player can select a turtle between stages, but when a turtle is defeated during a stage, he is captured, like the first NES game. The player can get a chance to rescue a captured turtle after clearing a stage. |
| Teenage Mutant Ninja Turtles III: The Manhattan Project Original release date(s): 1991 | Release years by system: 1991 – NES |
| Teenage Mutant Ninja Turtles III: The Manhattan Project Original release date(s): 1991 | Notes: The third TMNT game for the NES. A side-scrolling beat 'em up similar to the previous game, with the addition of each turtle having a new special attack. |
| Teenage Mutant Ninja Turtles III: Shredder's Last Stand Original release date(s): 1991 | Release years by system: 1991 – Handheld electronic game |
| Teenage Mutant Ninja Turtles: Basketball Original release date(s): 1991 | Release years by system: 1991 – Handheld electronic game |
| Teenage Mutant Hero Turtles Original release date(s): 1991 | Release years by system: 1991 – Handheld electronic game |
| Teenage Mutant Hero Turtles: Four for Four Original release date(s): 1992 | Release years by system: 1992 – Handheld electronic game |
| Teenage Mutant Ninja Turtles: The Hyperstone Heist Original release date(s): 1992 | Release years by system: 1992 – Sega Genesis |
| Teenage Mutant Ninja Turtles: The Hyperstone Heist Original release date(s): 1992 | Notes: This is the first TMNT game released for the Sega Genesis. It features much of the same character animations as Teenage Mutant Ninja Turtles: Turtles in Time, and some levels were reused from that game with a few minor cosmetic changes. However, there is a completely new plot, some new levels, and one new boss. The Japanese Mega Drive version of the game was released as Teenage Mutant Ninja Turtles: Return of the Shredder. |
| Teenage Mutant Ninja Turtles III: Radical Rescue Original release date(s): 1993 | Release years by system: 1993 – Game Boy |
| Teenage Mutant Ninja Turtles III: Radical Rescue Original release date(s): 1993 | Notes: This was the third and last game in the Game Boy series. The player begins the game taking control of Michelangelo, who must rescue the other turtles, along with Splinter and April, from their cells. |
| Teenage Mutant Ninja Turtles: Tournament Fighters Original release date(s): 1993 | Release years by system: 1993 – SNES, Sega Genesis; 1994 – NES |
| Teenage Mutant Ninja Turtles: Tournament Fighters Original release date(s): 1993 | Notes: Developed by Konami. It is a fighting game. While the title is the same, the game is drastically different for each console. Like many competitive fighting games of the era, Tournament Fighters borrowed heavily from elements of Street Fighter II. |
| Teenage Mutant Ninja Turtles: Dimension X Assault Original release date(s): 1995 | Release years by system: 1995 – Handheld electronic game |
| Ninja Turtles: The Next Mutation Original release date(s): 1997 | Release years by system: 1997 – Handheld electronic game |
| Teenage Mutant Ninja Turtles Original release date(s): 2003 | Release years by system: 2003 – GameCube, Xbox, PlayStation 2 and Windows |
| Teenage Mutant Ninja Turtles Original release date(s): 2003 | Notes: Konami returned to adapt the 2003 TV series into a video game franchise, resulting in a new Teenage Mutant Ninja Turtles game. The plot of this game is loosely based on the first season. Only supports 1-2 players. |
| Teenage Mutant Ninja Turtles Original release date(s): 2003 | Release years by system: 2003 – Game Boy Advance |
| Teenage Mutant Ninja Turtles Original release date(s): 2003 | Notes: This is the first TMNT game released for the Game Boy Advance. This single player only game is unique in that each Turtle has his own set of levels to complete. In addition to the traditional side-scrolling levels, there are third-person view races, a shell-glider level for Donatello and a bike race between Raphael and Casey Jones. |
| Teenage Mutant Ninja Turtles 2: Battle Nexus Original release date(s): 2004 | Release years by system: 2004 – GameCube, Game Boy Advance, Xbox, PlayStation 2 and Windows |
| Teenage Mutant Ninja Turtles 2: Battle Nexus Original release date(s): 2004 | Notes: The second of the Konami games based on the 2003 TV series. Just as the previous game was an alternate retelling of the first season, Battle Nexus adapts episodes from Season 2. Many improvements were made over the previous installment, including the addition of up to 4 player local co-op. It also features a slightly altered port of the original Teenage Mutant Ninja Turtles arcade video game as an unlockable. The Game Boy Advance version is a side-scrolling game like the previous GBA game. |
| Teenage Mutant Ninja Turtles 3: Mutant Nightmare Original release date(s): 2005 | Release years by system: 2005 – GameCube, Nintendo DS, Xbox and PlayStation 2 |
| Teenage Mutant Ninja Turtles 3: Mutant Nightmare Original release date(s): 2005 | Notes: The third and final Konami game based on the 2003 TV series, this time adapting elements from the third season. Mutant Nightmare is the first TMNT game to be rated E10+. As with Battle Nexus, up to 4 players can play simultaneously. It also features a slightly altered port of the Teenage Mutant Ninja Turtles: Turtles in Time arcade game as an unlockable. The DS version is a side-scrolling game like the previous GBA games. |
| TMNT: Mutant Melee Original release date(s): 2005 | Release years by system: 2005 – GameCube, PlayStation 2, Xbox and Windows |
| TMNT: Mutant Melee Original release date(s): 2005 | Notes: This is a fighting game. The PS2 version was not released in the US. |
| Teenage Mutant Ninja Turtles: Battle for the City Original release date(s): 2005 | Release years by system: 2005 – Plug and play |
| Teenage Mutant Ninja Turtles: Battle for the City Original release date(s): 2005 | Notes: Developed by WayForward Technologies and published by Tech2Go. Side scrolling platform game based on the 2003 series. |
| Teenage Mutant Ninja Turtles: Mutants and Monsters Mayhem Original release date(s): 2006 | Release years by system: 2006 – Plug and play |
| Teenage Mutant Ninja Turtles: Mutants and Monsters Mayhem Original release date(s): 2006 | Notes: Developed by WayForward Technologies and published by Tech2Go. Light gun shooting game based on the 2003 series. |
| Teenage Mutant Ninja Turtles: Way of the Warrior Original release date(s): 2006 | Release years by system: 2006 – Plug and play |
| Teenage Mutant Ninja Turtles: Way of the Warrior Original release date(s): 2006 | Notes: Developed by Zombie Studios and published by Tech2Go. A motion-based training simulator based on the 2003 series. |
| TMNT: Ninja Adventures Original release date(s): 2007 | Release years by system: 2007 – Windows |
| TMNT: Ninja Adventures Original release date(s): 2007 | Notes: TMNT: Ninja Adventures is a mini game and activity center for Windows. It was released by Focus Multimedia Ltd in May 2007. In the US, Ninja Adventures was packaged with TMNT action figures, while it was sold separately in the UK. |
| TMNT Original release date(s): 2007 | Release years by system: 2007 – Xbox 360, Wii, PlayStation 2, PlayStation Portable, Nintendo DS, GameCube, and Windows |
| TMNT Original release date(s): 2007 | Notes: A game based on the 2007 movie developed by Ubisoft Montreal. It is a single player action-adventure game. Ubisoft released the game on March 20 after winning the rights from Konami, who had produced all the previous games. The game features both collaborative team-ups between the turtles and single-player campaigns. |
| TMNT Original release date(s): 2007 | Release years by system: 2007 – Game Boy Advance |
| TMNT Original release date(s): 2007 | Notes: A side-scrolling beat-em-up similar to classic arcade video games based on the 2007 film. It was developed by Ubisoft Montreal and published by Ubisoft. |
| Teenage Mutant Ninja Turtles: Smash-Up Original release date(s): September 22, 2009 | Release years by system: 2009 – Wii, PlayStation 2 |
| Teenage Mutant Ninja Turtles: Smash-Up Original release date(s): September 22, 2009 | Notes: Developed by Game Arts, a team of developers who worked on Super Smash Bros. Brawl and the Ninja Gaiden and Dead or Alive series. It is a 4-player fighting game for the Wii and PS2. |
| Teenage Mutant Ninja Turtles: Turtles in Time Re-Shelled Original release date(s): August 5, 2009 | Release years by system: 2009 – Xbox Live Arcade; 2009 – PlayStation Network |
| Teenage Mutant Ninja Turtles: Turtles in Time Re-Shelled Original release date(s): August 5, 2009 | Notes: A 2.5D remake of Turtles in Time developed by Ubisoft Singapore. |
| Teenage Mutant Ninja Turtles: Arcade Attack Original release date(s): November 10, 2009 | Release years by system: 2009 – Nintendo DS |
| Teenage Mutant Ninja Turtles: Arcade Attack Original release date(s): November 10, 2009 | Notes: Developed by Ubisoft Nagoya and the last TMNT game published by Ubisoft, it is a 2.5D beat-em-up |
| Nickelodeon Teenage Mutant Ninja Turtles Totally Turtles Tabletop Pinball Original release date(s): 2013 | Release years by system: 2013 – Pinball |
| Teenage Mutant Ninja Turtles: Out of the Shadows Original release date(s): August 28, 2013 | Release years by system: 2013 – Xbox Live Arcade, Windows; April 15, 2014, PlayStation Network |
| Teenage Mutant Ninja Turtles: Out of the Shadows Original release date(s): August 28, 2013 | Notes: Developed by Red Fly Studio and the first TMNT game published by Activision. Loosely based on the 2012 series and IDW comics. |
| Teenage Mutant Ninja Turtles Original release date(s): October 22, 2013 | Release years by system: 2013 – Xbox 360, Wii, Nintendo 3DS |
| Teenage Mutant Ninja Turtles Original release date(s): October 22, 2013 | Notes: Developed by Magic Pockets and the second TMNT game published by Activision. The PlayStation 3 and Wii U versions of this game were cancelled. |
| Teenage Mutant Ninja Turtles: Training Lair Original release date(s): July 22, 2014 | Release years by system: 2014 – Xbox 360 Kinect |
| Teenage Mutant Ninja Turtles: Training Lair Original release date(s): July 22, 2014 | Notes: Based on the 2014 film, developed by Float Hybrid Entertainment and published by Studios. |
| Teenage Mutant Ninja Turtles Original release date(s): July 23, 2014 | Release years by system: 2014 — Nintendo 3DS, Android, iOS |
| Teenage Mutant Ninja Turtles Original release date(s): July 23, 2014 | Notes: Based on the 2014 film, developed by Magic Pockets and published by Activision for Nintendo 3DS. |
| Teenage Mutant Ninja Turtles: Danger of the Ooze Original release date(s): October 28, 2014 | Release years by system: 2014 – Nintendo 3DS, PlayStation 3, and Xbox 360 |
| Teenage Mutant Ninja Turtles: Danger of the Ooze Original release date(s): October 28, 2014 | Notes: Developed by WayForward Technologies and published by Activision, the game is designed to span the gap between seasons 2 and 3 of the 2012 series. |
| Teenage Mutant Ninja Turtles: Mutants in Manhattan Original release date(s): May 24, 2016 | Release years by system: 2016 – PlayStation 4, PlayStation 3, Xbox One, Xbox 360, and Windows |
| Teenage Mutant Ninja Turtles: Mutants in Manhattan Original release date(s): May 24, 2016 | Notes: Developed by PlatinumGames and published by Activision. Loosely based on the IDW comics. |
| Teenage Mutant Ninja Turtles Original release date(s): 2017 | Release years by system: 2017 – Arcade |
| Teenage Mutant Ninja Turtles Original release date(s): 2017 | Notes: Developed and published by Raw Thrills. It is a 3D side-scrolling beat 'em up based on the 2012 TV series and inspired by Turtles in Time. |
| Teenage Mutant Ninja Turtles: Portal Power Original release date(s): 2017 | Release years by system: 2017 – Windows, Mac (computer), iOS |
| Teenage Mutant Ninja Turtles: Portal Power Original release date(s): 2017 | Notes: Developed by Red Fly Studio and published by Nickelodeon. It is a 3D side-scrolling beat 'em up, team based, based on the 2012 TV series |
| Teenage Mutant Ninja Turtles: Shredder's Revenge Original release date(s): June 16, 2022 | Release years by system: 2022 – Windows, Nintendo Switch, PlayStation 4, PlayStation 5, Xbox One, Android, iOS |
| Teenage Mutant Ninja Turtles: Shredder's Revenge Original release date(s): June 16, 2022 | Notes: Developed by Tribute Games and published by Dotemu, it is a side-scrolling beat 'em up based on the 1987 TV series and inspired by Turtles in Time. |
| Teenage Mutant Ninja Turtles: The Cowabunga Collection Original release date(s): August 30, 2022 | Release years by system: 2022 – Windows, Nintendo Switch, PlayStation 4, PlayStation 5, Xbox One, Xbox Series X/S |
| Teenage Mutant Ninja Turtles: The Cowabunga Collection Original release date(s): August 30, 2022 | Notes: Developed by Digital Eclipse and published by Konami. It is a compilation including Teenage Mutant Ninja Turtles (NES), Teenage Mutant Ninja Turtles (Arcade), Teenage Mutant Ninja Turtles II: The Arcade Game (NES), Teenage Mutant Ninja Turtles: Fall of the Foot Clan (Game Boy), Teenage Mutant Ninja Turtles: Turtles in Time (Arcade, SNES), Teenage Mutant Ninja Turtles III: The Manhattan Project (NES), Teenage Mutant Ninja Turtles: The Hyperstone Heist (Genesis), Teenage Mutant Ninja Turtles II: Back from the Sewers (Game Boy), Teenage Mutant Ninja Turtles: Radical Rescue (Game Boy), and Teenage Mutant Ninja Turtles: Tournament Fighters (NES, SNES, Genesis). |
| Teenage Mutant Ninja Turtles Arcade: Wrath of the Mutants Original release date(s): April 23, 2024 | Release years by system: 2024 – Windows, Nintendo Switch, Nintendo Switch 2, PlayStation 4, PlayStation 5, Xbox One, Xbox Series X/S |
| Teenage Mutant Ninja Turtles Arcade: Wrath of the Mutants Original release date(s): April 23, 2024 | Notes: Developed by Cradle Games and Raw Thrills and published by GameMill Entertainment. It is a port of Raw Thrills' 2017 arcade video game with additional levels and bosses. |
| Teenage Mutant Ninja Turtles: Splintered Fate Original release date(s): July 17, 2024 | Release years by system: 2024 – iOS, Windows, Nintendo Switch, Nintendo Switch 2, PlayStation 4, PlayStation 5, Xbox One, Xbox Series X/S |
| Teenage Mutant Ninja Turtles: Splintered Fate Original release date(s): July 17, 2024 | Notes: Developed by Super Evil Megacorp. |
| Teenage Mutant Ninja Turtles: Mutants Unleashed Original release date(s): October 18, 2024 | Release years by system: 2024 - Windows, Nintendo Switch, PlayStation 4, PlayStation 5, Xbox One, Xbox Series X/S |
| Teenage Mutant Ninja Turtles: Mutants Unleashed Original release date(s): October 18, 2024 | Notes: Published by Outright Games. It is a video game set in the universe of the 2023 film Teenage Mutant Ninja Turtles: Mutant Mayhem. |
| Teenage Mutant Ninja Turtles: Tactical Takedown Original release date(s): August 14, 2025 | Release years by system: 2025 – Windows, Nintendo Switch, Xbox Series X/S |
| Teenage Mutant Ninja Turtles: Tactical Takedown Original release date(s): August 14, 2025 | Notes: Developed by Strange Scaffold. |
| Teenage Mutant Ninja Turtles: The Last Ronin Original release date(s): TBA | Release years by system: TBA - PlayStation 5, Windows, Xbox Series X/S |
| Teenage Mutant Ninja Turtles: The Last Ronin Original release date(s): TBA | Notes: Developed by Black Forest Games and published by THQ Nordic. It is a video game adaptation of the 2020-21 comic book limited series of the same name co-written by Peter Laird and Kevin Eastman with Tom Waltz. |
| Teenage Mutant Ninja Turtles: Empire City Original release date(s): 2026 (To be launched) | Release years by system: 2026 – Windows, Virtual Reality |
| Teenage Mutant Ninja Turtles: Empire City Original release date(s): 2026 (To be launched) | Notes: Developed by Cortopia Studio, and published by Beyond Frames Entertainment. It´s a first person VR game that is to be launched |
| Teenage Mutant Ninja Turtles Original release date(s): 2026 | Release years by system: 2026 – Redemption game |
| Teenage Mutant Ninja Turtles Original release date(s): 2026 | Notes: Developed and published by Konami Arcade Games. |

== Related games ==
| Game | Details |
|---|---|
| Smite Original release date(s): March 25, 2014 | Release years by system: 2014 – Windows, 2015 – Xbox One, 2016- PlayStation 4, 2019 – Nintendo Switch |
| Smite Original release date(s): March 25, 2014 | Notes: The Turtles were added as fighting pass in November 2020. |
| Tony Hawk's Pro Skater 5 Original release date(s): NA: September 29, 2015 (PlayStation 4 and Xbox One); AU: October 1, 2015 (PlayStation 4 and Xbox One); EU: October 2, 2015 (PlayStation 4 and Xbox One); WW: December 15, 2015 (PlayStation 3 and Xbox 360) | Release years by system: 2015 - PlayStation 4, Xbox One, PlayStation 3, and Xbox 360 |
| Tony Hawk's Pro Skater 5 Original release date(s): NA: September 29, 2015 (PlayStation 4 and Xbox One); AU: October 1, 2015 (PlayStation 4 and Xbox One); EU: October 2, 2015 (PlayStation 4 and Xbox One); WW: December 15, 2015 (PlayStation 3 and Xbox 360) | Notes: The Teenage Mutant Ninja Turtles were added with a post-release patch. |
| Injustice 2 Original release date(s): May 11, 2017 | Release years by system: 2017 – iPhone, iPad, Android, PlayStation 4, Xbox One, and Windows |
| Injustice 2 Original release date(s): May 11, 2017 | Notes: Developed by Netherrealm Studios and published by Warner Bros. Interactive Entertainment; DC Comics fighting game.; Also featuring playable guest characters from Netherrealm Studios' Mortal Kombat series and Dark Horse Comics' Hellboy.; Ninja Turtles make their playable guest appearance as part of the DLC Fighter Pack 3. With Leonardo as the "default" Turtle outside the Gear Loadout.; In their character ending, the Turtles explain that they wound up in the DC universe after Krang and Shredder attempted to send them to Dimension X. After defeating Brainiac, the Turtles celebrate with a "Super Salty" pizza courtesy of Harley Quinn, which actually contains the edible nanotechnology 5-U-93-R, augmenting the Turtles to Kryptonian levels of strength and durability, allowing them to easily defeat Krang and Shredder upon their return to their dimension. |
| Brawlhalla Original release date(s): October 17, 2017 | Release years by system: 2021 – Windows, Nintendo Switch |
| Brawlhalla Original release date(s): October 17, 2017 | Notes: Developed by Blue Mammoth Games and published by Ubisoft. It is a 2D fighting game which features the Teenage Mutant Ninja Turtles as playable guest characters. |
| Nickelodeon Super Brawl Universe Original release date(s): WW: August 3, 2018 (Android); WW: March 12, 2019 (iOS) | Release years by system: 2018 – Android; 2019 – iOS |
| Nickelodeon Super Brawl Universe Original release date(s): WW: August 3, 2018 (Android); WW: March 12, 2019 (iOS) | Notes: Features the 2018 versions of the Turtles as playable characters. |
| Nickelodeon Kart Racers Original release date(s): NA: October 23, 2018; EU: October 26, 2018 | Release years by system: 2018 – PlayStation 4, Xbox One, and Nintendo Switch |
| Nickelodeon Kart Racers Original release date(s): NA: October 23, 2018; EU: October 26, 2018 | Notes: Features the 2012 versions of the Turtles as playable characters, along with tracks themed after the series. This is the first Nickelodeon crossover video game for consoles to feature Teenage Mutant Ninja Turtles content. |
| Nickelodeon Kart Racers 2: Grand Prix Original release date(s): October 6, 2020 (PlayStation 4, Xbox One, and Nintendo Switch) December 1, 2020 (Windows) | Release years by system: 2020 – PlayStation 4, Xbox One, Nintendo Switch, and Windows |
| Nickelodeon Kart Racers 2: Grand Prix Original release date(s): October 6, 2020 (PlayStation 4, Xbox One, and Nintendo Switch) December 1, 2020 (Windows) | Notes: Sequel to Nickelodeon Kart Racers. Features the 2012 versions of the Turtles and Shredder as playable characters, along with tracks themed after the series. |
| Nickelodeon All-Star Brawl Original release date(s): October 5, 2021 | Release years by system: 2021 – Windows, Nintendo Switch, PlayStation 4, PlayStation 5, Xbox One, Xbox Series X/S |
| Nickelodeon All-Star Brawl Original release date(s): October 5, 2021 | Notes: Features the 1987 versions of Leonardo, Michelangelo, and April as playable characters, along with stages themed after the series. Shredder was later included through a free DLC update. |
| Nickelodeon Kart Racers 3: Slime Speedway Original release date(s): October 14, 2022 | Release years by system: 2022 – Windows, Nintendo Switch, PlayStation 4, PlayStation 5, Xbox One, Xbox Series X/S |
| Nickelodeon Kart Racers 3: Slime Speedway Original release date(s): October 14, 2022 | Notes: Sequel to Nickelodeon Kart Racers 2: Grand Prix. Features the 1987 versions of the Turtles and April as playable characters, along with tracks themed after the series. Eastman & Laird Raphael is available as downloadable content. |
| Call of Duty: Modern Warfare II Original release date(s): October 28, 2022 | Release years by system: 2022 – Windows, PlayStation 4, PlayStation 5, Xbox One, Xbox Series X/S |
| Call of Duty: Modern Warfare II Original release date(s): October 28, 2022 | Notes: Developed by Infinity Ward and published by Activision. It is a first-person shooter game which features Shredder as a playable operator. |
| Nickelodeon All-Star Brawl 2 Original release date(s): November 7, 2023 | Release years by system: 2022 – Windows, Nintendo Switch, PlayStation 4, PlayStation 5, Xbox One, Xbox Series X/S |
| Nickelodeon All-Star Brawl 2 Original release date(s): November 7, 2023 | Notes: Sequel to Nickelodeon All-Star Brawl. Features the 1987 versions of Raphael, Donatello, and April as playable characters, along with stages themed after the series and Shredder as a boss. Rocksteady also appears as a playable character via downloadable content. |
| Call of Duty: Black Ops 6 Original release date(s): October 25, 2024 | Release years by system: 2024 – Windows, PlayStation 4, PlayStation 5, Xbox One, Xbox Series X/S |
| Call of Duty: Black Ops 6 Original release date(s): October 25, 2024 | Notes: Developed by Treyarch and Raven Software, published by Activision. It is a first-person shooter game which features the Turtles and Splinter as playable characters. |
| Sonic Racing: CrossWorlds Original release date(s): September 25, 2025 | Release years by system: 2025 – Windows, Nintendo Switch, Nintendo Switch 2, PlayStation 4, PlayStation 5, Xbox One, Xbox Series X/S |
| Sonic Racing: CrossWorlds Original release date(s): September 25, 2025 | Notes: Developed by Sonic Team, published by Sega. A downloadable content pack based on Mutant Mayhem released on July 28, 2026. The pack adds the four Turtles as playable characters, a Pizzafire Van vehicle, and a New York City racetrack. |
| Nicktoons & The Dice of Destiny Original release date(s): September 30, 2025 (Windows, Nintendo Switch, PlayStation 5, Xbox Series X/S, Steam) December 5, 2025 (Nintendo Switch 2) | Release years by system: 2025 – Windows, Nintendo Switch, Nintendo Switch 2, PlayStation 5, Xbox Series X/S, Steam |
| Nicktoons & The Dice of Destiny Original release date(s): September 30, 2025 (Windows, Nintendo Switch, PlayStation 5, Xbox Series X/S, Steam) December 5, 2025 (Nintendo Switch 2) | Notes: Features the 2012 versions of the Turtles. Leonardo is a playable character while Donatello, Raphael and Michelangelo are non-playable characters. Karai appears as a boss. |

== Mobile games ==
| Game | Details |
|---|---|
| Teenage Mutant Ninja Turtles Fast Forward: Ninja Training NYC Original release date(s): 2005 | Release years by system: 2005 – Mobile phone |
| Teenage Mutant Ninja Turtles Fast Forward: Ninja Training NYC Original release date(s): 2005 | Notes: Produced by uclick and developed by Overloaded, this is a mobile game based on Season 6 of the 2003 TV series, subtitled Fast Forward. It is the first adaptation of the TMNT series on mobile phones, and it includes both a fighting game mode and a platform game mode. |
| TMNT: The Power of 4 Original release date(s): 2006 | Release years by system: 2006 – Mobile phone |
| TMNT: The Power of 4 Original release date(s): 2006 | Notes: Produced by uclick and developed by Overloaded, this is a mobile game based on the 2007 CGI movie. It combines action-adventure and racing levels. |
| Teenage Mutant Ninja Turtles: The Ninja Tribunal Original release date(s): 2009 | Release years by system: 2009 – Mobile phone |
| Teenage Mutant Ninja Turtles: The Ninja Tribunal Original release date(s): 2009 | Notes: RPG based on the fifth season of the 2003 TV series |
| TMNT: The Shredder Reborn Original release date(s): 2009 | Release years by system: 2009 – Mobile phone |
| TMNT: The Shredder Reborn Original release date(s): 2009 | Notes: Sequel to The Ninja Tribunal |
| Teenage Mutant Ninja Turtles: Rooftop Run Original release date(s): April 18, 2013 | Release years by system: 2013 – iPhone; 2013 – iPod; 2013 – Android |
| Teenage Mutant Ninja Turtles: Rooftop Run Original release date(s): April 18, 2013 | Notes: Endless runner based on the 2012 TV series airing on Nickelodeon. |
| Teenage Mutant Ninja Turtles: Mutant Rumble Original release date(s): August 26, 2013 | Release years by system: 2013 – iOS, Android |
| Teenage Mutant Ninja Turtles: Mutant Rumble Original release date(s): August 26, 2013 | Notes: TMNT game published by Swappz Interactive and based on the 2012 TV series airing on Nickelodeon. |
| Teenage Mutant Ninja Turtles: Battle Match Original release date(s): December 9, 2015 | Release years by system: 2015 – iPhone, iPad, and Android |
| Teenage Mutant Ninja Turtles: Battle Match Original release date(s): December 9, 2015 | Notes: Teenage Mutant Ninja Turtles: Battle Match is a mobile Match-3 game based on the fourth season of the 2012 TV series. Developed by Tiny Castle Studios and published by Nickelodeon. |
| Teenage Mutant Ninja Turtles: Portal Power Original release date(s): January 6, 2016 (iPhone, iPad, Android, and Kindle Fire) December 14, 2017 (Windows) | Release years by system: 2016 – iPhone, iPad, Android, and Kindle Fire; 2017 – Windows |
| Teenage Mutant Ninja Turtles: Portal Power Original release date(s): January 6, 2016 (iPhone, iPad, Android, and Kindle Fire) December 14, 2017 (Windows) | Notes: Teenage Mutant Ninja Turtles: Portal Power is an action and adventure mobile game based on the 2012 TV series. Developed and published by Nickelodeon. Released on Steam on December 14, 2017. |
| Teenage Mutant Ninja Turtles Legends Original release date(s): June, 2016 | Release years by system: 2016 – iPhone, iPad, Android, and Kindle Fire |
| Teenage Mutant Ninja Turtles Legends Original release date(s): June, 2016 | Notes: Developed and published by Ludia. |
| Rise of the Teenage Mutant Ninja Turtles Ninja Run Original release date(s): WW: 2018 | Release years by system: 2018 – Android, iOS |
| Rise of the Teenage Mutant Ninja Turtles Ninja Run Original release date(s): WW: 2018 | Notes: Endless runner based on the Rise of the Teenage Mutant Ninja Turtles 2018 TV series. |
| Teenage Mutant Ninja Turtles: Mutant Madness Original release date(s): September 16, 2020 | Release years by system: 2020 – Android; 2020 – iOS |
| Teenage Mutant Ninja Turtles: Mutant Madness Original release date(s): September 16, 2020 | Notes: Developed by Synapse Games and published by Kongregate. |
| Teenage Mutant Ninja Turtles: Shredder's Revenge Original release date(s): January 10, 2023 | Release years by system: 2023 – Android, iOS, Windows, Nintendo Switch, PlayStation 4, PlayStation 5, Xbox One |
| Teenage Mutant Ninja Turtles: Shredder's Revenge Original release date(s): January 10, 2023 | Notes: Developed by Tribute Games and published by Dotemu, it is a side-scrolling beat 'em up based on the 1987 TV series and inspired by Turtles in Time. |
| Teenage Mutant Ninja Turtles: Splintered Fate Original release date(s): May 4, 2023 | Release years by system: 2023 – iOS, Windows, Nintendo Switch, Nintendo Switch 2, PlayStation 4, PlayStation 5, Xbox One, Xbox Series X/S |
| Teenage Mutant Ninja Turtles: Splintered Fate Original release date(s): May 4, 2023 | Notes: Developed by Super Evil Megacorp. |

== See also ==
- List of video games based on comics
