= Splinter (Teenage Mutant Ninja Turtles) =

Fictional mutant rat and martial arts instructor

- Teenage Mutant Ninja Turtles character
- Artwork by series co-creator Kevin Eastman.
- First appearance: Teenage Mutant Ninja Turtles #1 (May 1984)
- Created by: Kevin Eastman; Peter Laird
- Portrayed by: Mainline: Fiona Scott (Ninja Turtles: The Next Mutation); Danny Woodburn (2014 film); Peter Donald Badalamenti II (Out of the Shadows); Others: Mark Enis (The Coming Out of Their Shells Tour); David Anthony (The Mystery of the Cliffs); Jack William Scott (We Wish You a Turtle Christmas)
- Voiced by: Mainline: Peter Renaday (1987 series); Kevin Clash (1990 and 1991 films); James Murray (Teenage Mutant Ninja Turtles III); Stephen Mendel (The Next Mutation); Darren Dunstan (2003 series, Smash-Up, Turtles Forever); Mako (2007 film); Hoon Lee (2012 series, Danger of the Ooze, Nickelodeon All-Star Brawl 2); Tony Shalhoub (2014 and 2016 films); Eric Bauza (Rise of the Teenage Mutant Ninja Turtles series and film); Jackie Chan (Mutant Mayhem); Others: Larry Moran (Light n' Lively commercial); Townsend Coleman (1987 series substitute for two episodes in 1991); Godfrey Nelson (The Coming Out of Their Shells Tour); Keith Scott (Pizza Hut commercial); Eric Anzalone (We Wish You a Turtle Christmas and Turtle Tunes); Steven Marking (singing voice in We Wish You a Turtle Christmas); Hideyuki Umezu (Superhuman Legend, Japanese media); Greg Baldwin (additional dialogue for 2007 film); Terrence Scammell (2007 video game); David Wills ('87 counterpart in Turtles Forever); Feodor Chin (2013 video game); Danny Woodburn (2014 film tie-in games); Matthew Yang King (Don vs. Raph); Nolan North (Mutants in Manhattan); Gary Doodles (TMNT Team Up!); Sander Argabrite (child Splinter in Rise of the TMNT); Cory Yee (SMITE TMNT Battle Pass); Sean Gurnsey (Shredder's Revenge); Fred Tatasciore ("Splinter Vermin" in Tales of the Teenage Mutant Ninja Turtles); Brady Noon (speaking voice in Tales of the Teenage Mutant Ninja Turtles, uncredited); Paul Nakauchi (Splintered Fate, Call of Duty: Black Ops 6, Warzone 2.0)

In-universe information
- Species: Mutant street rat
- Affiliation: Teenage Mutant Ninja Turtles
- Weapon: Wooden Cane
- Children: Leonardo, Raphael, Donatello, and Michelangelo (adoptive sons); Miwa/Karai (daughter; 2012 series)
- Origin: Osaka, Japan
- Residence: New York Sewers, United States
- Abilities: Mastery of ninjutsu; High intellect; Keen sense of smell; Stealth mastery

Splinter, often referred to as Master Splinter or Sensei by his students/sons, is a fictional character from Teenage Mutant Ninja Turtles comics and all related media. A mutant rat, he is the grave and stoic sage of the Turtles, their ninjutsu and martial arts instructor, and their adoptive father. He is traditionally depicted as either the former pet rat of the ninja Hamato Yoshi, or as a mutated form of Yoshi himself.

The character was originally a parody of the Marvel Comics character Stick.

== Mirage Comics, original films, 2003 series, 2023 film ==
In both the original comics and the live-action films, Splinter is a pet rat of ninja Hamato Yoshi in Japan, and uniquely intelligent for his species. Yoshi becomes embroiled in a deadly dispute with fellow ninja Oroku Nagi over a woman named Tang Shen and is eventually murdered in turn by Nagi's brother, Oroku Saki, as revenge for his brother's death. However, in the 1990 film and 2003 TV series, Nagi is removed entirely. Additionally, in the 1990 film, Splinter escapes from his cage during the murder, and attacks Saki, clawing at his face. Saki, in turn, slices his ear off. It is suggested that this mutilation is the reason Saki took the Shredder disguise to hide the scars. In contrast, in the 2003 animated series, it was Hun's face which Splinter clawed.

Without a home, Splinter is forced to run away and live in New York City's sewers. Due to a traffic accident, four baby turtles and a canister of mutagenic ooze are sent down into the sewer. The canister mutates both Splinter and the turtles into humanoid forms; it also enhances the former's already sophisticated intellect. Splinter names the four turtles Leonardo, Donatello, Raphael, and Michelangelo (after a book on Renaissance artists that he found in a storm drain) and trains them in the arts of ninjutsu so that they can avenge his dead master, while raising them as his own sons, as well as educating them in scholastic.

In the 2003 animated series, Splinter possesses a significant reputation as a ninja master; in a multi-part episode, he is revealed to be a champion of the Battle Nexus, a multi-dimension-spanning contest where the greatest combatants of various dimensions come together to fight each other for the title of Battle Nexus Champion. When the Turtles learn of the Battle Nexus, they participate as well, resulting in Splinter forfeiting when called upon to fight Michelangelo, as he wishes to allow his sons the opportunity to fight where he succeeded in the past. Splinter's backstory is told in the episode "Tale of Master Yoshi", which reveals he was a hungry rat that snuck into the home of the Ancient One, the master and adoptive father of Yoshi. He was saved by Tang Shen, Yoshi's love interest and the Ancient One's adopted daughter, who kept him as a pet. After Yoshi killed his former friend Yukio Mashimi for murdering Shen, he moved to New York City with the rat, whom he named Splinter as a reminder of his loss and vengeance.

In the episode "Tempus Fugit", Splinter and the Turtles, who time-traveled into the future, are sent back to the present time, but the villain, Viral, blasts Splinter with a decompiler ray that scatters his bits all over the internet. While Splinter was not seen much in the "Back to the Sewers" season, the focus of those episodes is the Turtles' efforts to find Splinter's data bits by traveling all over cyberspace. Splinter is restored in the final episode and helps defeat the Cyber Shredder.

In Teenage Mutant Ninja Turtles: Mutant Mayhem, Splinter is completely unconnected to Hamato Yoshi. This version of the character is a street rat who hated humans and was mutated alongside the Turtles after being exposed to mutagen while searching for food. Splinter decided to learn ninjutsu from online videos and Jackie Chan movies and teach it to his sons.

== 1987 animated series ==
In the 1987 TMNT series, Splinter and Hamato Yoshi are the same person. He is a martial art instructor for the Foot Clan in Japan, and also has a passion for Renaissance art. Yoshi is framed by his rival, Oroku Saki, for trying to murder their common dojo master. Unable to prove his innocence and expelled from the Foot Clan, Splinter moves to New York City, where he lives as a hermit in its sewers and befriends the rats. One day, he comes across four baby turtles which were accidentally dropped by a boy through a sewer grate. Yoshi keeps them as pets and treats them like his children. Yoshi and the turtles are inadvertently exposed to mutagen, which mutates them based on other beings they had been in contact with. Thus, the turtles, being in a pet store with people touching them, gain humanoid forms. Yoshi, having been in contact with sewer rats, becomes a humanoid rat. In the episode "Splinter No More", Splinter is given the chance to become human again, but realizes he prefers being with the turtles and had no place as a human anymore.

Yoshi raises the turtles by himself and gives them the names of his favorite Renaissance artists: Leonardo, Donatello, Raphael, and Michelangelo. Yoshi is given the nickname "Splinter", due to his proficiency at breaking wooden boards, and he teaches them the art of ninjutsu in order to protect themselves. Like many real-life ninja masters, he has a strong sense of honor and follows very strict rules which all four of his students adopt. Splinter always has a wise quote or speech for the turtles and often steps in with his ninja skills when the turtles are caught in a, seemingly inescapable, predicament. Splinter does not have a father/son relationship with the turtles, but still cares for them.

== Coming Out of Their Shells tour ==
The 1990 live action concert tour entitled "Coming Out of Their Shells", saw Splinter described as the rat owned by Hamato Yoshi mutated to a humanoid form, rather than Yoshi himself mutated into a ratlike body, bringing him more in line with the original Mirage Comics incarnation as well as that of the then recently released feature film, which also followed the Mirage origin. In the concert events, he is still the Turtles' mentor in the martial arts, as well as encouraging their musical pursuits, and sings the track Skipping Stones as a solo ballad. He encourages the Turtles as they deal with the Shredder's plot to steal all music in the world, though he does not physically join the battles against Shredder or his foot soldiers. Peter Renaday reprises his role as the voice of Splinter, but was uncredited.

== Archie TMNT Adventures comics ==
Archie Comics published the Teenage Mutant Ninja Turtles Adventures which began as an adaptation of the 1987 TV series in comic form, though the series eventually deviated from this and began telling its own stories with little to no connection to the original animated series, effectively becoming a separate continuity. In the comic, they maintained Splinter's human background even when they started publishing original storylines.

== 2012 animated series ==
In the 2012 series, Splinter is again introduced as Hamato Yoshi, voiced by Hoon Lee. His relationship with Oroku Saki is mostly intact, with the Hamato and Foot Clans later revealed to have had a long-term conflict with each other. Despite being raised as brothers, both Yoshi and Saki become rivals due to their affection for Tang Shen, and Saki wishes to discredit Yoshi in front of her. Yoshi loses his temper by mistake and the altercation forever destroyed their relationship, culminating with Saki learning of his true heritage and starting a battle that burns down the Hamato Clan monastery, indirectly killing Shen and, seemingly, Shen and Yoshi's daughter, Miwa.

After moving to New York City, Yoshi has just purchased four pet turtles when he stumbles upon an exchange in an alley between two Kraang droids. Seeking to silence Yoshi before he can share what he has seen, a fight ensues and the canister the droids have been carrying smashes open, splashing both Yoshi and his turtles with a mutagen. After stepping on a black rat in an alley, Yoshi mutates while the Turtles take on human characteristics. Realizing he can no longer live a normal life, he retreats to the New York sewers, where he raises the turtles as sons and teaches them ninjutsu.

Splinter's sons, along with their new friend April O'Neil, soon become involved in the conflict with both of Splinter's old enemies, the Shredder and the Kraang. Reluctantly allowing the group to get involved, Splinter appoints Leonardo as their leader and continues to offer counsel and lessons as they engage various foes. Recognizing great sensitivity in April, he begins training her as a kunoichi and comes to regard her with a fatherly fondness. Splinter ventures from his lair on only two occasions. The first is when he falls under the control of the Rat King, who attempts to persuade him to forsake his humanity and embrace the life of a rat. Splinter eventually breaks free with the Turtles' help and defeats the Rat King. The second is when Shredder kidnaps April and lures Splinter to his stronghold for a final confrontation. Splinter overpowers Shredder's men and engages his old foe. Shredder reveals that Splinter's daughter, Miwa, had not died and that Shredder had taken her and raised her as his own. Splinter nearly defeats Shredder, only to be attacked by Miwa; Miwa, whose name is now Karai, has been taught, by Shredder, that Splinter is responsible for her mother's death.

As the second season progresses, Splinter tells the turtles about his true relationship with Karai. He is eventually able to convince Karai of the truth about their past; soon afterward, Karai becomes a mutant snake after being exposed to mutagen that Shredder intended to use on the Turtles. Later, Earth is invaded by the Kraang and, in the ensuing battle, much of Splinter's lair is destroyed before Splinter is able to defeat Kraang Sub-Prime. Splinter then leaves the lair to find his missing sons. Splinter again engages Shredder in battle and, seemingly victorious, Splinter prepares to reunite with his sons, April, and Casey Jones, only to be attacked from behind by Shredder and thrown into a sewer drain. He is rescued from drowning by Karai and left in an area of the sewer to recover.

At the end of the third season, Splinter asks Shredder for a truce to stop the alien Triceratons. Shredder agrees but at the end of the battle, Shredder kills Splinter. The turtles hold him one last time before they, Casey and April flee with Fugitoid, as he arrives at the very last moment in a spaceship as Earth is sucked into a black hole. The Turtles and Fugitoid travel back in time to before Earth was destroyed and manage to save Splinter's life. In the episode "Requiem", Splinter is killed once more by Shredder and buried at the O'Neil farmhouse. In the fifth season, Splinter's spirit temporarily returns to the physical plane in order to help his family and friends after Shredder's henchmen accidentally open a portal to the nether world in an attempt to revive Shredder.

== IDW comics and 2014 film ==
The IDW Comics series, which began in 2011, presents a new origin for both Splinter and the Turtles. All five were originally test subjects at Baxter Stockman's bioengineering firm, Stockgen Corporation. When agents of the Foot Clan break into Stockgen and attempt to steal an alien mutagen, Splinter and the Turtles escape but are exposed to the mutagen in the process. While the element of Splinter being Hamato Yoshi is still present, Oroku Saki is now the Foot Clan's medieval leader, with Splinter and the Turtles being the reincarnations of Yoshi and his sons.

Hamato Yoshi was a member of the Foot Clan in feudal Japan known for his unruly temper and lack of discipline. But with the help of his master, Masato, and his love, Tang Shen, he learned to control his temper and becomes a skilled warrior. His contemporary, Oroku Saki, seeks to make the Foot a clan to be feared. When Yoshi openly objects to the needless slaughter of a village connected to an assassination target, he and his family are declared traitors. Yoshi cannot save Tang Shen from being murdered but does save his sons. Yoshi raises and trains his sons for three years until Saki and the Foot find them. When his sons are executed before his eyes, Yoshi swears that he will destroy Oroku Saki before he, himself, falls under the blade.

The live-action 2014 reboot uses the test subject origin story, but Splinter is neither a reincarnation of Hamato Yoshi nor is he associated with him in any way. In fact, Yoshi is written out of the script entirely and Splinter simply learns ninjutsu from a discarded book after being mutated.

== 2018 animated series ==
In Rise of the Teenage Mutant Ninja Turtles, voiced by Eric Bauza and Sander Argabrite (as a younger version of the character), Splinter is once again Hamato Yoshi, a descendant of the Hamato clan; however he is presented as ex-martial arts film star known as Lou Jitsu. The Turtles were intentionally mutated using Yoshi's DNA, making them his biological relatives rather than adopted.

Yoshi escaped his responsibility as a Hamato due to his mother being forced to leave him, nursing a growing resentment towards his clan until his departure. Later, a combination of being exploited by his former girlfriend to perform in gladiatorial combat and deep-seated worries the turtles were created to be soldiers gave Splinter an intense aversion to violence. Afraid that his sons would be put in harm's way he is less diligent in training them in ninjutsu, until he learns that the Foot Clan have been assembling the Shredder's armour, and he takes a more active role in preparing them for the danger his irresponsibility has placed them in. When they discover that their idol Lou Jitsu that they have been playfully emulating for years is in fact their sensei, they learn to appreciate their father more.

Splinter shows a great aptitude in using anything as a potential weapon, as shown in his films' he fights with Fish and Ladders in the episode 'Evil League of Mutants'.

== Appearance ==
Splinter in a scene from Teenage Mutant Ninja Turtles II: The Secret of the Ooze

Splinter in the 2008 season of TMNT

Splinter's physical appearance remains fairly consistent in all incarnations of the character; he is portrayed as an elderly rat dressed in robes. The coloration of his fur varies depending on the incarnation. While brown fur is the most common depiction, he is sometimes depicted as having gray fur. In the original live-action films, he is missing part of his right ear, which was cut off by Saki. In the 2012 series, Splinter is physically taller and younger than he was in past incarnations. He also has a more rat-like design along with distinctive body marks on his fur.

== Personality ==
Splinter is portrayed as wise, intelligent, and a skilled "elderly martial arts master". He is nearly always calm. Even when angry, he refrains from raising his voice. He is the quintessential calm, all-knowing, and wise master of all martial arts. Also, Splinter has strong willpower as he doesn't give up without a fight. Also, in the 1987 series, Splinter can control his brain waves through his willpower.

Splinter cares for his adopted sons with fierce devotion, rescuing them in very critical moments in the series, such as when Shredder attempted to execute the four on a building, or when Bishop tried to literally tear them apart for science. He is furious when the Foot attempts to slay the Turtles with a robot Splinter and goes all the way to Japan after the four are kidnapped by the Tribunal. Splinter does go to the Turtles for help whenever he was in a tough spot, especially shown in the 1987 series episode "The Old Switcheroo" when an accident caused himself and Shredder to switch bodies as he went to them for help in getting back to his real body but had a hard time convincing them at first but they believed him when they heard his wisdom and that he didn't want to fight them as they worked together to set things right.

Despite his love for his sons, Splinter is fairly militant with them, especially when they are young and inexperienced. Splinter's main fear is that he and his family will one day be exposed to the outside world, as he is understandably protective. He disciplines the turtles when they become disobedient or unruly. His punishments include making them do back-flips repeatedly in the second live-action film, or being sent to the Hashi, a form of punishment in the 2014 film by using chopsticks for balance. At times, Splinter does get physical with the Turtles whenever he gets mad with them or breaks up their siblings arguments, which led him to ground them, especially in 2012 series.

Splinter is not completely cut off from the pleasures of modern culture. Splinter is often depicted to be a fan of soap operas. This is stated in a few different incarnations but is most displayed in the 2003 series sixth season, where that hobby is mentioned several times. It is also mentioned in both the 2007 animated film and the 2012 series that he very much enjoys dessert, particularly Ice pops.

In the 2018 series, Splinter is displayed as somewhat irresponsible given his different history, spending most of his time eating and watching TV, although he occasionally shows the traits mentioned above.

In the 2023 film Teenage Mutant Ninja Turtles: Mutant Mayhem, he is shown to have an extreme hatred for the human race due to a perception that they were all out to hurt mutants, and as a result, he is overly protective of the Turtles. He is depicted as less of a traditional martial arts master and more of a worrisome single father figure, though he is still skilled in martial arts.

== Portrayal ==
- In the 1987 series, he was voiced by Peter Renaday in the American version and by Hideyuki Umezu (TV), Yuzuru Fujimoto (NHK-BS2) and Kiyoshi Kobayashi (VHS) in the Japanese versions. The film Turtles Forever features this incarnation, voiced by David Wills.
- In The Coming out of their Shells Tour, Splinter's speaking voice was again provided by Peter Reneday, though he went uncredited in the credits for both the Pay per view and the subsequent home video release.
- In Ninja Turtles: The Next Mutation, Splinter is voiced by Stephen Mendel.
- In the 2003 animated series and Turtles Forever American version, Splinter is voiced by Darren Dunstan. In the Japanese version, he is voiced by Shōto Kashii.
- In the first two films, he is voiced by Kevin Clash, and in the third, he was voiced by James Murray. In the 2007 animated film, he was voiced by Mako Iwamatsu; Iwamatsu died during production in 2006, and his new fill-in Greg Baldwin stepped in to provide a large share of Splinter's dialogue in the finished film (receiving a credit only for "additional voices"). Splinter was Mako's final film role before his death. In the Japanese versions, he was voiced by Kiyoshi Kobayashi and Joji Yanami in the first film, Michio Hazama in the second, Hideyuki Umezu in the third and Shoto Kashii in the fourth.
- In the 2007 TMNT game, he is voiced by Terrence Scammell.
- In the 2012 animated series, Splinter is voiced by Hoon Lee.
- In the 2013 video game TMNT: Out of the Shadows, Splinter is voiced by Feodor Chin.
- In the 2014 reboot, Splinter was portrayed by actor Danny Woodburn and his voice was provided by Tony Shalhoub. In Teenage Mutant Ninja Turtles: Out of the Shadows, the film's sequel, Shalhoub again voices Splinter and the motion-capture for the character is done by Peter D. Badalamenti.
- In the 2018 animated series, Rise of the Teenage Mutant Ninja Turtles, Splinter is voiced by Eric Bauza.
- In the 2020 pinball machine Teenage Mutant Ninja Turtles by Stern, Splinter is voiced by Marc Silk.
- In the 2023 animated feature, Teenage Mutant Ninja Turtles: Mutant Mayhem, Splinter is voiced by Jackie Chan. This version is portrayed as less of a sensei and more like a typical middle-aged father, though he still retains his knowledge of ninjutsu and martial arts, which he learns from watching videos about it. Splinter is also shown to speak vermin language as seen when he speaks to Scumbug.
  - In the spin-off series Tales of the Teenage Mutant Ninja Turtles, Splinter's "vermin language" was provided by Fred Tatasciore.

== Video games ==
Splinter appears as a supporting character in most video games based on the Teenage Mutant Ninja Turtles franchise. In Teenage Mutant Ninja Turtles on the Nintendo Entertainment System, he transforms back into a human if the player reaches the ending. Splinter is a playable character in the 2003 video game, Teenage Mutant Ninja Turtles 2: Battle Nexus, TMNT: Mutant Melee, TMNT: Smash Up and Teenage Mutant Ninja Turtles: Shredder's Revenge. Splinter appears as a supporting character in Nickelodeon All-Star Brawl 2 with Hoon Lee reprising his role. In December 2023, he was added to Fortnite as an outfit.
