= Teenage Mutant Ninja Turtles: Out of the Shadows (video game) =

2013 video game

- Developer: Red Fly Studio
- Publisher: Activision
- Director: Joel Manners
- Producer: Prem Krishnan
- Designer: Chris Frechette
- Programmer: John Styes
- Writers: Joel Manners; Chris Frechette; Jason Henderson
- Series: Teenage Mutant Ninja Turtles
- Engine: Unreal Engine 3
- Platforms: PlayStation 3 Xbox 360; Microsoft Windows
- Release: Xbox 360 and Microsoft Windows; August 28, 2013; PlayStation 3 April 15, 2014
- Genre: Action-adventure
- Modes: Single-player, multiplayer

Teenage Mutant Ninja Turtles: Out of the Shadows is a 2013 hack and slash video game developed by Red Fly Studio and published by Activision. Although not a direct adaptation of the 2012 Teenage Mutant Ninja Turtles animated series, the game is heavily inspired by the show. Out of the Shadows features a four-player online mode and offline two-player co-op. In the game' story, the Turtles face various adversaries, including the Foot Clan, the Purple Dragons, Baxter Stockman, and the Kraang, while trying to stop the Shredder from developing a new weapon using stolen Kraang technology that could eliminate them and their allies.

The game was released on August 28, 2013, for Xbox 360 and Microsoft Windows, to mostly negative reviews. The PlayStation 3 version was delayed to April 15, 2014, to polish the game before release and to address issues from the other versions.

== Gameplay ==
Teenage Mutant Ninja Turtles: Out of the Shadows is a hack and slash video game, played from a third person perspective, where the player assumes the role of the titular characters. Players are able to switch between the four Turtles - Leonardo, Donatello, Michelangelo and Raphael - and, as such, up to four players can play the game at the same time; even if there aren't four players, the remaining Turtles are controlled by an AI and will be following the player. Each of the four Turtles has a different play style, depending on their weapons: Leonardo wields two katanas, making him the most basic one out of the Turtles; Donatello wields a bō, which comes with an increased range at the expense of agility; Michelangelo wields two nunchuks, making him the fastest turtle and allowing him to quickly build up combos; and Raphael wields two sai, making him fight his enemies more directly and aggressively.

The gameplay emphasizes teamwork, with players being able to perform team combos or KOs on enemies. Special moves fill a green bar located in the upper left side of the HUD, which, when filled, allows players to perform a powerful combo to quickly finish off enemies. There are also collectibles, such as pizzas, which restore health, and shurikens, which are used as ranged weapons.

The game is linear, with levels taking players to various locations, including the sewers, Shredder's lair, and a secret Kraang facility. Enemies vary from street thugs to Foot Clan ninjas and Kraang soldiers. Some levels incorporate stealth segments, where players have to sneak around and take out enemies quietly. There is also an Arcade mode, where players go through all the levels in the main story in an arcade game style, and Combat Challenges, where players fight waves of enemies in various locations from the story; some of these levels also have a boss fight at the end.

== Plot ==
The game begins with April O'Neil waking up in a warehouse at the docks. While avoiding laser beams fired by something outside, she tries to call the Turtles for help, but is kidnapped by Karai. Flashing back to several hours prior, the Turtles' daily training session is shown to be interrupted by Donatello and April's announcement of the former's newest invention: a tracking device built into one of the latter's boots, which will allow the Turtles to quickly find April, should she need their help. While checking the boot's map against a police scanner, the Turtles learn that a series of robberies have occurred at several labs across Manhattan and decide to investigate.

Arriving at one of the robberies in progress, the Turtles discover the culprits to be the Purple Dragons, whom they proceed to defeat. Learning that their next theft will be at the Krangs' TCRI building, they decide to investigate the connection between the robberies, and follow a truck full of stolen Krang technology into the subway, where they discover that the Dragons are working with the Foot Clan. Going deeper into the subway, they find a disfunct railway, which the Foot Clan uses to transport the stolen technology via subway cars to their lair undetected. The Turtles board the subway car carrying the latest technology shipment, but are attacked by Karai, who cuts off their trail by destroying the railway with explosives.

Unable to continue any further, the Turtles decide to return home, but while travelling through the sewers, they stumble upon Baxter Stockman's Mousers. While fighting them and trying to discover Stockman and the Foot Clan's connection, the Turtles are called by April, and reluctantly giver her their coordinates so that she could help them with the investigation. April finds herself infiltrating Stockman's warehouse at the docks, where she discovers he is working on a secret project for the Shredder using the stolen Krang technology, but before she can inform the Turtles, she is kidnapped by Karai. Meanwhile, the Turtles battle Stockman's massive, three-headed Cerberus Mouser, which they manage to destroy, though Stockman escapes, and the Turtles are shocked to discover April is gone.

Returning home, the Turtles seek Master Splinter's advice, who tells them to consider their next step very carefully. After tracking April to Shredder's lair, the Turtles mount a rescue, and decide to infiltrate the lair through its glass roof. They fight their way across rooftops to a crane, which is guarded by Karai. After defeating her, Leonardo offers Karai a chance to join them, but she claims that her father will destroy the Turtles and vanishes. Using the crane to break into the lair, the Turtles battle the Shredder, but are quickly overpowered, and saved only by Stockman's timely call, which informs the Shredder that his project is ready. While the Shredder leaves to check it out, the Turtles decide not to follow him, and rescue April instead. Once saved, she informs them of her findings, including the fact that the Foot Clan has been using Stockman's Mousers to dig an underground tunnel leading to TCRI.

The Turtles infiltrate TCRI through the same tunnel, and fight their way past Foot Clan ninjas and Krang to reach the Shredder. Along the way, the disable a Dimension X portal to stop the Krang reinforcements, and discover that Stockman's secret project is a helmet which grants the wearer telekinetic powers. In spite of these new abilities, the Turtles ultimately defeat the Shredder, and decide to destroy the helmet to prevent its powers from being used for evil. Returning home, the Turtles recount their adventure to April and Splinter, and celebrate their victory with a pizza party. Meanwhile, the Shredder vows to kill his enemies one day, and the Krang make plans of their own to eliminate the Turtles before they become a threat to their invasion plans.

== Reception ==
The Xbox 360 and Microsoft Windows versions of the game received generally negative reviews by critics, and the Xbox 360 version holds a score of 38/100 on Metacritic. Game Informer gave the game a 2/10, calling it "terrible in every way". The PlayStation 3 version of the game was awarded a disappointing score of a 4/10 by Push Square.

IGN was slightly more positive, as it gave the game a 6.1/10, while praising for its video within the Teenage Mutant Ninja Turtles series and its arcade mode.

The game was pulled from all digital stores in January 2017 as Activision chose not to renew the license.
