= Rise of the Teenage Mutant Ninja Turtles: The Movie =

2022 film

- Promotional release poster
- Directed by: Andy Suriano; Ant Ward
- Screenplay by: Tony Gama-Lobo; Rebecca May
- Story by: Andy Suriano; Ant Ward
- Based on: Characters created by Peter Laird and Kevin Eastman
- Starring: Ben Schwartz; Omar Miller; Brandon Mychal Smith; Josh Brener; Haley Joel Osment; Kat Graham; Eric Bauza
- Edited by: Matthew Feinman; Billy Weber
- Music by: Matt Mahaffey
- Production company: Nickelodeon Movies
- Distributed by: Netflix
- Release date: August 5, 2022
- Running time: 82 minutes
- Country: United States
- Language: English
- Box office: $570,000

Rise of the Teenage Mutant Ninja Turtles: The Movie is a 2022 American animated superhero film that is a continuation of the animated television series Rise of the Teenage Mutant Ninja Turtles (2018–2020). The film was directed by series co-developers Andy Suriano and Ant Ward from a screenplay by Tony Gama-Lobo and Rebecca May, based on a story by Suriano and Ward. It stars the show's regular voice cast of Ben Schwartz, Omar Miller, Brandon Mychal Smith, Josh Brener, Kat Graham, and Eric Bauza, with newcomer Haley Joel Osment as Casey Jones. In the film, the Turtles, with the help of their new ally from the future, Casey Jones, set out to stop the evil alien force, the Krang, from invading Earth.

Development began in October 2018, and the project was officially announced in February 2019. Production began in March 2020. Nickelodeon approached Suriano and Ward to make a Rise of the Teenage Mutant Ninja Turtles film during development of the second season, and the two worked on both simultaneously. Due to the season being shortened, the writers had to adjust the film's plot to align it with changes made to the season's story. The majority of the animation was done by Flying Bark Productions and Top Draw Animation, the former having provided the animation for the television series.

Rise of the Teenage Mutant Ninja Turtles: The Movie premiered on Netflix on August 5, 2022. It received generally positive reviews from critics for its animation, action scenes, performances, and emotional core. The film was nominated for three awards at the 2nd Children's and Family Emmy Awards, with art director Carl Anders Beu winning for Outstanding Individual Achievement in Animation.

== Plot ==
In the year 2044, the evil alien Krang and his army has invaded Earth, and the resistance has fallen. In one final attempt, Leonardo and Michelangelo send their student Casey Jones back in time to stop the invasion by finding a key that allowed the Krangone to come to Earth, though it costs Leonardo and Michelangelo their lives to do so. Casey successfully reaches the present day, several months after the Shredder's defeat. After Leonardo breaks Donatello's pizza box stack record, Raphael alerts both of them and Michelangelo to a theft unfolding by Hypno-Potamus and Warren Stone, with the key that Casey Jones is looking for included among the stolen items. The Turtles manage to stop them, but the Foot Clan arrives and claims the key. Back in the new lair, Raphael and Leonardo get into an argument due to the latter's growing ego.

Meanwhile, Casey finds April O'Neil, who knocks him out and takes him to the Turtles' lair. He then explains his mission, and after mentioning the Krang, Splinter explains that they came to Earth long ago and were exiled to another realm by a band of warriors who created and used the key, which is a mystic weapon. The Turtles, along with April, Splinter, and Casey, go after the Foot, who have managed to open the portal. The Turtles battle the Krang, but Krang One drains their mystic powers, forcing them to retreat. Leonardo manages to seize the key and close the portal. To protect Leonardo, Raphael forces him to escape while he is captured.

Afterward, the remaining Turtles, along with Casey, go after the Krang and Raphael, while Splinter and April remain behind to get rid of the key. The Krang manage to find the Turtles' lair through Raphael. They parasitically possess the members of the Foot Clan and send them after the key while they prepare the portal on top of the Metro Tower, the tallest building in the city. The Turtles and Casey are ambushed in the subway tunnels and get separated. Casey calls out Leonardo for his arrogance, revealing the truth about what happens to his family in the future before they reunite with the rest of the Turtles. They then find Raphael, who has been possessed by Krang One, and seize the key. The Krang then use the key to open the portal and bring forth the Technodrome, launching their invasion of New York City.

While April, Splinter, and Casey occupy the Krang forces, the Turtles board the ship. Leonardo goes after Raphael, while Donatello and Michelangelo try to seize control of the ship. They are captured, but Leonardo reaches out to Raphael and helps him break free, and the brothers manage to regain their mystic powers. Casey, Splinter, and April successfully defeat Krang Two, who is left badly mutilated and immobilised. The Turtles engage the remaining Krang One in battle but are outmatched, with Michelangelo, Donatello, and Raphael thrown out of the ship during the battle. Leonardo forces Krang One back to the prison dimension and orders Casey to close the portal, which destroys the Technodrome and traps Leonardo in the dimension with the enraged Krang One, who attacks him in blind fury. Michelangelo, Raphael, and Donatello save him using Michelangelo's newly developed portal powers, leaving Krang One trapped within the prison dimension forever.

Sometime later, the heroes enjoy pizza on top of the Brooklyn Bridge, with Casey revealing that former Foot Clan recruit Cassandra Jones is his mother. They watch the city as it is being rebuilt and make a vow to defend it when it is needed. Afterward, Raphael tries to break Leonardo's pizza box stack record.

== Voice cast ==
- Ben Schwartz as Leonardo and others
- Omar Miller as Raphael and others
- Brandon Mychal Smith as Michelangelo and others
- Josh Brener as Donatello and others
- Haley Joel Osment as Casey Jones and others
- Kat Graham as April O'Neil and others
- Eric Bauza as Splinter and others
- Jim Pirri as Krang One and others
- Toks Olagundoye as Krang Two and others
- Rob Paulsen as Foot Lieutenant and others
- John Michael Higgins as Warren Stone
- Rhys Darby as Hypno-Potamus
- Eugene Byrd, Meghan Falcone, Nika Futterman, and Oliver Vaquer as various

== Production ==
=== Development ===
In February 2019, it was announced that feature films based on Rise of the Teenage Mutant Ninja Turtles and The Loud House were in production for Netflix. Rise of the Teenage Mutant Ninja Turtles: The Movie began development months prior, in October 2018, but production didn't begin until March 2020. Showrunners Andy Suriano and Ant Ward were first approached by a Nickelodeon executive to develop a film during work on the second season. The two batted around ideas over the weekend and pitched their favorites the following Monday. The idea that would get the green light involved a mysterious stranger arriving from the future, warning the Turtles that an alien species called the Krang was set to invade the planet. The duo worked on the film simultaneously with the series' second season. Due to the season being shortened, the writers had to adjust the film's plot to align it with changes made to the season's story. Ward noted that, as a result, some details in the film did not align with the series, but he still felt they worked around it.

=== Writing and animation ===
Ward felt the longer format allowed them to explore a larger, character-driven story. Their goal for the film was to bring in new fans as well as make it accessible to general Turtles fans. Suriano also felt that it would be fun for Rise fans to see "seeds that we planted earlier on pay off". The filmmakers took inspiration from various disaster, apocalyptic, and time-travel films when crafting the story. Giving Leonardo his traditional role as leader of the Turtles was something that had been planned since the series' inception. Suriano knew the film would be their chance to properly conclude the storyline. In the series, Raphael is the leader of the Turtles, as he is the oldest. The film features a rift between the two as a plot point. A traditional aspect of Turtles lore, the filmmakers wanted to portray their rivalry in a "unique way".

The Casey Jones in the film is Rise's second take on the character following Cassandra "Casey" Jones from the show. Ward felt that there was a sense of responsibility in the film's version of the character that might not have been as apparent in previous iterations. While writing the Krang as villains, Suriano and Ward aimed for them to be "formidable adversaries to the Turtles" and establish them as more dangerous foes than the series' portrayal of the Shredder. In order to emphasise the threat represented by the Krang, the characters' size proportions were made larger than previous portrayals.

The entire production was conducted during the COVID-19 pandemic, and the team had eight months to complete an animatic. A 90-plus team at Nickelodeon worked on the film. The majority of the animation was done by Flying Bark Productions in Sydney, Australia, and Top Draw Animation in the Philippines, with the former having provided the animation for the series. For the animation, the crew aimed to make everything "a little extra". A bigger budget allowed for more color, shading, and fluid character animation in the film than in the series.

== Release ==
Rise of the Teenage Mutant Ninja Turtles: The Movie was originally set to be released in 2021 but was pushed back to 2022. The trailer was released on July 6, 2022, and the film premiered on Netflix on August 5, 2022. In China, the film was theatrically released on November 19, 2022, where it was distributed by China Film Group Corporation. It would go on to gross $570,000.

== Reception ==
=== Critical response ===
On the review aggregator website Rotten Tomatoes, 79% of 14 critics' reviews are positive, with an average rating of 6.6/10. On Metacritic, the film has a weighted average score of 61 out of 100, based on reviews from 5 critics, indicating "generally favorable reviews".

Hayden Mears of IGN gave the film an 8 out of 10 rating, praising its fight sequences, designs, humor, emotional core, and performances (particularly Ben Schwartz as Leonardo) but criticizing the plot for its simplicity. He summarized, "Rise of the Teenage Mutant Turtles: The Movie soundly trumps other Turtles reboots in the humor and heart departments, although its simple plot keeps it just short of amazing." The New York Times Claire Shaffer commended the animation and called the narrative heartfelt, though emotionally simplistic. She summarized: "All in all, Rise is as dependable as a Manhattan slice: not mind-blowing in the slightest, but just delightfully cheesy enough to keep kids and adults alike satisfied". Digital Mafia Talkie's Pramit Chatterjee hailed it as both one of the best action and animated films of the year, lauding the animation, fight sequences, sound design, story, and performances.

Jennifer Borget of Common Sense Media gave the film 3 out of 5 stars, praising the animation and emotional core, though finding characterization lacking. She wrote, "Though this is a dark, and at times frightening, story, it's also thrilling and exciting for long-time fans of the iconic characters." Michael Nordine of Variety called the film "serviceable, if also forgettable". He found the future timeline to be the most compelling part of the film, commenting that "Middle-Aged Mutant Ninja Turtles might not roll off the tongue as easily, but it probably would have been a better movie." Collider's Erick Massoto criticized the characterization and felt that the humor, and the film as a whole were inferior to the television series. He directed some praise to the climax, which he described as "a freefall battle that, albeit brief, is an exciting action scene that makes me eager to go back and watch it again".

=== Accolades ===
| Award | Date of ceremony | Category | Recipient(s) | Result | Ref. |
|---|---|---|---|---|---|
| Annie Awards | February 25, 2023 | Outstanding Achievement for Character Design in an Animated Feature Production | Ida Hem | Nominated | |
| Golden Reel Awards | February 26, 2023 | Outstanding Achievement in Sound Editing – Non-Theatrical Animation | Jeff Shiffman, Jessey Drake, Brad Meyer, Xinyue Yu, Carol Ma | Won | |
| Children's and Family Emmy Awards | December 16–17, 2023 | Outstanding Special Class Animated Program | Rise of the Teenage Mutant Ninja Turtles: The Movie | Nominated | |
| Children's and Family Emmy Awards | December 16–17, 2023 | Outstanding Sound Editing and Sound Mixing for an Animated Program | Jeff Shiffman, Jacob Cook, Jessey Drake, Brad Meyer, Xinyue Yu, Carol Ma | Nominated | |
| Children's and Family Emmy Awards | December 16–17, 2023 | Individual Achievement in Animation | Carl Anders Beu | Won | |
