= TMNT (GBA video game) =

- Developer: Ubisoft Montreal
- Publisher: Ubisoft
- Producers: Bertrand Helias; Mathieu Beaulieu
- Designers: Gaël Léger; Paul Warne
- Programmers: Alexandre Maari; Jean-François Major; André Mathieu
- Artists: Jonathan Lavigne; Stéphane Boutin; Justin Cyr; Simon Nadeau
- Writer: Taras Stasiuk
- Composer: Michel Marsan
- Series: Teenage Mutant Ninja Turtles
- Platform: Game Boy Advance
- Release: NA: March 20, 2007; AU: March 22, 2007; EU: March 23, 2007
- Genre: Hack and slash
- Mode: Single player

TMNT is a hack and slash video game featuring the Teenage Mutant Ninja Turtles. It was developed by Ubisoft Montreal and published by Ubisoft for the Game Boy Advance. It is based on the 2007 film of the same name and was first released in North America on March 20, 2007, and was later released in Australia on March 22, 2007, and in Europe on March 23, 2007.

Another game with the same title was also released on the Xbox 360, Wii, PlayStation 2, GameCube, Microsoft Windows, Nintendo DS, and PlayStation Portable, though this version is vastly different from any of the others released, being a 2.5-D side-scrolling beat-'em-up game involving no three-dimensional gameplay - more in style of the original arcade installment.

== Reception ==
Reception

Review scores
Publication	Score
GameDaily	8 out of 10
GameSpot	8.1 out of 10
GameSpy	4.5 out of 5
IGN	8.5 out of 10
Nintendo Power	7/10
PALGN	8 out of 10

The game has received very positive reviews. Craig Harris from IGN said about the game, "it's easily one of the best brawling games I've played in years."
