= Teenage Mutant Ninja Turtles: Smash-Up =

2009 video game

- Cover for the Wii version
- Developers: Game Arts; Toylogic; Y's K (PS2)
- Publisher: Ubisoft
- Directors: Noriaki Kazama; Kazuhiro Irie
- Designer: Miki Naruse
- Programmers: Naoyuki Yamamoto; Masaru Toji; Katsuyuki Fukabori; Yasushi Sugiyama
- Artist: Takahiro Shimura
- Writers: Peter Laird; Matt Leunig
- Composers: Takahiro Nishi; John Yi
- Series: Teenage Mutant Ninja Turtles
- Platforms: Wii, PlayStation 2
- Release: NA: September 22, 2009; EU: September 25, 2009; AU: October 1, 2009
- Genres: Fighting, action
- Modes: Single-player, multiplayer

Teenage Mutant Ninja Turtles: Smash-Up is a 2.5D fighting game featuring characters from the Teenage Mutant Ninja Turtles franchise, released in celebration of the franchise's 25th anniversary. It was co-developed by Game Arts and Toylogic for the Wii, with a PlayStation 2 ported by Y's K. The game was published by Ubisoft in September 2009, and received mixed critical reception.

== Gameplay ==
A gameplay screenshot featuring April O'Neil fighting against Karai

Teenage Mutant Ninja Turtles: Smash-Up is a four-player platform fighter. During battle, players attempt to KO opponents by depleting their life bar, knocking them off the stage or into traps. Each character has their own unique move set, with many able to perform additional techniques such as clinging to and leaping from walls. Battles have multiple customization options, including an optional color-coded glow effect applied to characters to help players keep track of where they are.

Smash-Up stresses interaction with the environment, and stages feature traps, changes to the stage itself and interactive elements. Items will occasionally appear on the stage for players to collect, including life-restoring pizza and ninja skills that grant players special abilities like fire breathing and electrical shields.

In addition to standard Battle Royal multiplayer battles, Smash-Up offers several other gameplay modes. Arcade features a series of single-player battles interspersed with bonus stages, story cutscenes, and unique endings for each character. Survival challenges players to defeat 100 opponents before they lose three lives. Swap-Out allows players to choose two characters and switch between them at will in battle. Mission Mode requires players to complete certain objectives in 51 pre-set scenarios, such as attacking targets or defeating an opponent within a time limit. The game also features Tournament and Practice modes, as well as additional mini-games and online multiplayer features. Players can collect 'shells' during battles or mini-games and use them to unlock special features, including additional character costumes, concept art from various Ninja Turtles media, and trophies that other players can win in online tournaments. The PlayStation 2 version does not feature any online multiplayer functionality.

=== Characters ===
Twelve playable characters appear in both versions of Smash-Up. Seven characters are available by default and can be used in the Arcade mode, through which the other five characters can be unlocked for use in the game's other modes. The Wii version eatures four additional unlockable characters, including three guest characters from Ubisoft's Rabbids franchise, for a total of sixteen.

- April O'Neil (Note: Playable in Arcade Mode)
- Casey Jones
- Donatello
- Foot Ninja
- Fugitoid (Note: Wii-exclusive)
- Karai
- Leonardo
- Michelangelo
- Nightwatcher
- Ninja Rabbid
- Raphael
- Raving Rabbid
- Shredder
- Splinter
- Splinter Rabbid
- Utrominator

== Plot ==
As part of their training, Splinter announces that he and the turtles will compete against each other in a fighting tournament, inviting April and Casey to join them as well. He offers the winner a trophy and an item from his personal collection as a prize.

As the tournament concludes, the turtles receive an emergency communication from the Fugitoid, who has been captured by the Shredder. Before they can trace his location, Shredder cuts off Fugitoid's message. Karai appears and warns the turtles that Shredder intends to have Fugitoid build him a large-scale teleporter, allowing him and the Foot Clan to teleport anywhere on Earth. Though they suspect a trap, the turtles agree to follow Karai.

The turtles reach Shredder's base and defeat him. Karai turns on the turtles, revealing she helped them as part of a plan to usurp Shredder and take control of the Foot. Shredder recovers and attacks, but Leonardo kicks him and Karai through the teleporter, sending them away. The turtles free Fugitoid and use the teleporter to return to their lair, where Splinter rewards the winner. Each character has a unique ending showing how they celebrate their victory.

== Development ==
Smash-Up was developed by Japanese game developer Game Arts, who previously worked on Super Smash Bros. Brawl; and several former members of Team Ninja, who previously worked on Ninja Gaiden II and the Dead or Alive series. The game's existence was teased in late 2008 before being officially revealed on January 26, 2009. While Smash-Up is not specifically tied to any previous Ninja Turtles incarnation, it bears a similar artistic style to the 2007 CGI animated film TMNT and features voice acting by the cast of the 2003 animated series. Mirage Studios helped influence the character roster, which was said to include characters "you know well in addition to surprise characters you certainly wouldn't expect". The arcade mode cutscenes were co-written by Ninja Turtles co-creator Peter Laird and illustrated by Mirage Studios artists Jim Lawson and Eric Talbot. A 24-page comic book featuring an expanded version of the story also came packaged with the Wii version.

== Reception ==
Reception

Aggregate score
Aggregator	Score
Metacritic	(Wii) 67 of 100

Review scores
Publication	Score
1Up.com	B−
Game Informer	7.75 of 10
GameRevolution	F
GameSpot	7 of 10
GameTrailers	6.9 of 10
GameZone	7.5 of 10
IGN	7 of 10
Nintendo Power	7.5 of 10
Nintendo World Report	8 of 10
Official Nintendo Magazine	83%

The game received "average" reviews according to the review aggregation website Metacritic.

IGN said of the Wii version, "It's a Smash Bros. clone, but it just makes you want to play Smash Bros., instead." GameSpot said that the same console version "has good combat and solid content, but it lacks the refinement and razzle-dazzle to earn a title shot." Even so, some fans reacted negatively to the roster, which is significantly smaller than that of Super Smash Bros. Brawl and only contains characters from the 2003 animated series and 2007 film, while characters from the 1987 series and other films were ignored.
