= April O'Neil =

Fictional character in the Teenage Mutant Ninja Turtles universe

- Artwork for the variant cover of Teenage Mutant Ninja Turtles Micro-Series #7 August 2012. Art by Marley Zarcone.
- First appearance: Teenage Mutant Ninja Turtles #2 (October 1984)
- Created by: Kevin Eastman; Peter Laird
- Portrayed by: Mainline: list: Judith Hoag (1990 film); Paige Turco (Teenage Mutant Ninja Turtles II: The Secret of the Ooze and III) Angelica Bridges (Ninja Turtles: The Next Mutation); Megan Fox (2014 and 2016 films); Others: Lorie Stewart (Operation Blue Line); Sherie Rene Scott (The Coming Out of Their Shells Tour); Heidi Mollenhauer (understudy in The Coming Out of Their Shells Tour); Malina Weissman (young; 2014 film)
- Voiced by: Mainline: Renae Jacobs (1987 series); Veronica Taylor (2003 series and video game, Turtles in Time Re-Shelled, Smash-Up, Turtles Forever); Sarah Michelle Gellar (2007 film); Mae Whitman (2012 series, 2013 video game, Danger of the Ooze); Kat Graham (Rise of the Teenage Mutant Ninja Turtles series and film); Ayo Edebiri (Mutant Mayhem and Tales of the Teenage Mutant Ninja Turtles); Others: Dana Calitri (singing voice in The Coming Out of Their Shells Tour); Emi Shinohara (Mutant Turtles: Superman Legend, Japanese media); Rebecca Soler ('87 counterpart in Turtles Forever); Catherine Taber (2013 video game); Ashly Burch (Mutants in Manhattan); Jessica McKenna (April and Pirate April in Turtles Take Time (And Space)); Courtney Eastman (Pizza Friday!); Cassandra Sica (TMNT Team Up!); Lauren Lapkus (We Strike Hard and Fade Away into the Night); Katherine Slingsby (Shredder's Revenge); Abby Trott (Nickelodeon All-Star Brawl 1 and 2, Nickelodeon Kart Racers 3: Slime Speedway)

In-universe information
- Full name: April O'Neil
- Aliases: Ms. O'Neil; Red; Little Red Bird
- Species: Human; Living drawing (Mirage); Human/Utrom hybrid (2012 TV series)
- Affiliation: Splinter; Leonardo; Raphael; Donatello; Michelangelo
- Significant other: Casey Jones (love interest/boyfriend/fiancé/husband)

April O'Neil is a fictional character from the Teenage Mutant Ninja Turtles comics. She is the first human ally of the Ninja Turtles.

April made her first appearance in issue #2 of the Mirage comic series in 1984 as a computer programmer. She was later portrayed as a strong-willed news reporter in the Turtles' first animated series, as a warrior in the Teenage Mutant Ninja Turtles Adventures comic produced by Archie Comics, and various other personas in different TMNT media.

While depicted as a red-haired adult woman in the comic series and the 1987 and 2003 animated series, she is depicted as being a teenager in the 2012 and 2018 animated series, 2022 film, and the 2023 film Mutant Mayhem. Her love interests have varied, though she is typically paired with the vigilante Casey Jones.

April was voiced by Renae Jacobs in the 1987 animated series, Veronica Taylor in the 2003 animated series, Sarah Michelle Gellar in the 2007 film TMNT, Mae Whitman in the 2012 animated series, Kat Graham in the 2018 animated series and its 2022 film, and Ayo Edebiri in the 2023 film Mutant Mayhem. In film, she has been portrayed by Judith Hoag (1990), Paige Turco (1991 and 1993), Megan Fox (2014 and 2016), and by Malina Weissman as the younger version of the character in the 2014 film.

== Comics ==
=== Mirage Comics ===
Artwork for the cover of Teenage Mutant Ninja Turtles Book 2 3 vol. 10, June 1986. With the prototype of April O'Neil. (third print).

In the original Mirage Comics storyline for Teenage Mutant Ninja Turtles, April O'Neil was a skilled computer programmer and assistant to a famous yet nefarious scientist, Baxter Stockman. She helped program his MOUSER robots but, after discovering Baxter was using them to burrow into bank vaults, she fled his workshop. Robots chased her into the sewer where she was promptly saved by three of the Turtles. The Turtles later successfully fended off a MOUSER invasion.

After leaving her job with Baxter, April decided to open an antique shop. The shop was subsequently destroyed in a battle between the Turtles and Shredder and the Foot Clan. April and the Turtles retreated to a farm house in Northampton, Massachusetts, to recover and during this time she suffered recurrent nightmares about the Foot Clan's attack. During the mid-1990s, April became romantically involved with the violent vigilante Casey Jones, and the two of them eventually raised Shadow, the child of Casey's late wife Gabrielle, as their own.

In Volume 2 of the TMNT comics, April was attacked by a huge robot controlled by the brain of her former boss, Baxter Stockman, and injected with nanobots. With the help of the Utroms, the Turtles injected April with turtle versions of nanobots to stop Baxter's plan. The intervention saved April before Baxter's nanobots could reach her brain stem and kill her. The attack rendered April sterile. To deal with the emotional strain she became a female version of "Nobody", a vigilante crime fighter, until her identity was discovered by Casey Jones. With the help of Renet, a time-traveler who took April back through time, it was revealed that April was really a living drawing brought to life with the help of a magic crystal. She was drawn by her father before his own biological daughter Robyn O'Neil was born. Although anything that the crystal's prior owner, Kirby, drew with pencil would vanish after some time, April's father used a pen, which might explain why April lived past thirty without vanishing. Questions of realness and morality were too much for April; she bid farewell to Shadow and Casey and travelled to Alaska to be alone with her thoughts. Although the trip helped April cope with her demons and led to her eventual return to New York, her family history remained unexplored.

=== Archie Comics ===
In the Teenage Mutant Ninja Turtles Adventures series produced by Archie Comics, April began as a carbon copy of her animated counterpart from the 1987 TV series, but the writers developed her into a competent warrior after training with Splinter. Because of her frequent adventures with the Turtles, she lost her job at Channel 6 and became a freelance reporter.

In the winter 1994 Archie Special, April was mutated into a turtle herself. This made her the first official female turtle introduced to the series, three years before Venus de Milo's debut. Archie also published two sets of three-part April O'Neil mini-series (from January through June 1993).

=== Dreamwave Productions ===
The second issue of the Dreamwave Productions series (based on the 2003 animated series) focused entirely on O'Neil, consisting of a dream sequence showing how she had been pressured into a scientific career by her family despite having an interest in journalism.

=== IDW ===
In the continuity of the IDW comics, April is a very bright science student who interns at Baxter Stockman's genetic laboratory Stock Gen, where her father used to work before a stroke rendered him paralyzed. It is there that she first meets the Turtles and Splinter (at that time ordinary lab animals subjected to an intelligence-enhancing serum) and gives the Turtles their names.

April later nearly becomes a murder victim during a nocturnal break-in by a group of ninjas (the Foot Clan), who steal the Turtles along with several samples of Stockman's secret mutagenetic projects; the attempt at her life shakes her so much that she decides to take self-defense lessons from her fellow student Casey Jones, who later introduces her to the now-mutated Turtles and Splinter. April subsequently accompanies or assists the Turtles in their adventures and battles against their enemies, in the course of which she investigates Stockman's clandestine operations and makes an important contact in the Pantheon by incurring the sympathies of one of their members, Aka. While she and Casey begin a romantic relationship, Casey's self-doubts about his ability to protect his loved ones eventually cause them to drift apart.

After the establishment of Mutant Town, following a falling out with Baxter Stockman, April decided to move to Mutant Town, and is currently working as a reporter (in a reference to her career in various TMNT Media adaptions) to help show the outside world the true face of Mutant Town.

== Television ==
=== Teenage Mutant Ninja Turtles (1987 series) ===
April Harriet O'Neil, as depicted in the animated series Teenage Mutant Ninja Turtles (1987–1996) for the first seven seasons

In the 1987 cartoon series, April Harriet O'Neil was altered from her Mirage Studios character and instead was introduced as a television reporter for Channel 6 News. She had a strong nature and passion for her work, frequently expressing disagreement with her employer Burne Thompson's assignments. She also fell out repeatedly with Vernon Fenwick, the director/camera operator whose enormous ego compelled him to scoop April on her stories whenever possible. April was friends with Irma Langinstein, the receptionist at Channel 6. She lived in an apartment in New York City, though during the course of the series she was forced to relocate several times due to a variety of Turtle-related mishaps.

April was reporting on a series of high-tech equipment thefts when she came under attack by a gang of street punks. Thinking quickly, she managed to squeeze into a storm drain and ran from the mob until she hit a dead end. The Turtles were nearby and defeated the punks. She was taken back to their sewer lair, where they explained their origins to her. At first, she believed them to be responsible for the equipment thefts, but they agreed to help find the true culprits if she kept quiet about the Turtles' existence. April quickly became their major link to the outside world since their unusual appearance effectively precluded them from functioning above ground without some sort of disguise. To communicate with the Turtles, she used a Turtlecom, a device that functioned as a two way audio-video communications system.

April's friendship with the Turtles resulted in the opportunity to record exclusive footage of their encounters with Shredder, but despite her intimate knowledge of the details of their lives, she tended to keep her professional news reports about them impersonal and mysterious. She was a vocal champion of their cause, despite Burne Thompson's opinion that the Turtles were a menace to the city, and most episodes generally showed her attempting to convince Burne and the New Yorkers that the Turtles were not criminals. By the episode "Doomquest", she finally succeeded in this by publicly exposing Lord Dregg's plans to take over the Earth via propaganda campaigns.

April was frequently kidnapped by Shredder and used as bait in order to lure the Turtles out of hiding and destroy them.

April revealed her age in the Season 3 episode "Leather Head - Terror of The Swamp". In Florida on vacation, she and the Turtles found a body of water contaminated with a mutagen that made mutants feel youthful, while physically de-aging humans into four-year-old versions of themselves. Donatello did not allow April to enter the water, to which she lamented, "Oh, great! I'm doomed to be a decrepit twenty-eight-year-old hag!" Her Aunt Agatha ("Aggie"), who appeared in the episodes "Case of the Hot Kimono" and "Sleuth on the Loose", was a detective.

April was normally portrayed as a capable and independent woman. Her most important contribution to the Turtles was her access to research via the Channel 6 computers; using this information she could alert the Turtles to trouble and possible case leads. Her blue news van had classic headlights and the Channel 6 News logo on each side. April could usually be found wearing a distinctive yellow jumpsuit — modeled on that of Fujiko Mine in Lupin III Part 2 — with white boots. By the ninth season, April worked freelance for reasons never specified, and exchanged her yellow jumpsuit for a brown leather jacket. She continued to help the Turtles even after the defeat of Shredder and his subsequent exile to Dimension X.

==== Portrayal ====
April was voiced by Renae Jacobs. In the 25th Anniversary crossover TV special Turtles Forever, she was voiced by Rebecca Soler. Renae Jacobs auditioned for the role in Los Angeles in 1986. She developed her initial personification of O'Neil while preparing for the audition, having not read the comics. Her first day on set voice director Stu Rosen made it clear he did not approve of her for the role, and had waited to show her audition last, saying to her, "Every one I played, the producers said 'No, no, no, that's not April,' and finally I was out of people to show them, so I pulled your audition out and played it for them and they said 'That's April!'"

There was a very good character description of her, so I looked at that and I kind of built her based on me. I felt that she should be a very strong character with very good convictions, she should be a loyal friend; she should be serious about her work and she wanted to be taken seriously, not just looked at as another pretty face.

— Renae Jacobs

=== Teenage Mutant Ninja Turtles (2003 series) ===
April O'Neil, as depicted in the animated series Teenage Mutant Ninja Turtles (2003 - 2009) for the first six seasons

In the 2003 cartoon series, April, voiced by Veronica Taylor in English, got a costume change and her hair color was altered to a dark magenta tone for the new incarnation of the animated series produced by 4Kids Entertainment. However, she was no longer cast as a news reporter like in the original animated series, with her role now being similar to that of the Mirage Studios character: again, she served as an assistant to Baxter Stockman until his Mouser experiments got out of control, and after the Turtles saved her she became a faithful friend, ally, and "big sister" to them. April made much more use of her scientific expertise and she often used her computer skills to aid the Turtles. She developed a closer brother/sister relationship with Donatello, who shared many of her interests. In Season 7 she sometimes helped Donatello to collect Splinter's data bits. April developed a modest knowledge of combat skills after training with Splinter. Her quick thinking was often instrumental to the Turtles' survival.

Casey Jones is romantically attracted to April, though their contrasting personalities often make them bicker. By the third season, the two seemed to have quite a serious romantic relationship. In the series finale, "Wedding Bells and Bytes", she and Casey finally got married.

The young adult April continues to learn how to defend herself against Foot ninjas and other monstrosities by undergoing basic ninja training from the Turtles. She is quite skilled in some useful firearms, and can easily go through a laser grid with no problem at all. In the seventh and final season, she dons a yellow-and-black jumpsuit based on the TMNT film and carries a tantō sword to further perfect her fighting skills. At one point, she became psionically linked with a female mermaid-like mutant who had telepathically shown her the hardships of her childhood and that the few of her kind were on the verge of extinction.

In addition to her recently developed ninjutsu skills, April is incredibly intelligent, smart and resourceful in complex scientific fields; similar to her good friend Donatello. So much that she even had worked for the eccentric Baxter Stockman as his assistant. She was able to hack into the computers of Shredder's stronghold and even breach several codes. She was seen wielding a katana in the special episode Turtles Forever.

=== Teenage Mutant Ninja Turtles (2012 series) ===
Mae Whitman voices April O'Neil in the 2012 animated series. Her shoulder-length bright red hair with flowy bangs is tied with a white ponytail holder which becomes undone, at times, if she is under great stress or rage. Unlike her previous counterparts, she is a 16-year-old teenage girl and possesses exceptionally strong psychic powers, which she eventually learns to develop more and increase drastically throughout the fourth season. This is due to her being a half human, half Kraang-mutant as her mother was abducted and experimented on by the Kraang before she was born, including making her immune to mutagen. Her inherent psionic abilities are first hinted at in Episode 7, "Monkey Brains", when she had detected that a mutant-monkey was, in fact, a human scientist; merely saying that she "sometimes get a feeling about things", implying that she possesses extrasensory abilities as well. It even enabled her to hear far off sounds that Splinter, with his superhuman hearing, could not. On a personal level, while she still has potential for a relationship with Casey Jones, she has a more long-standing potential relationship with Donatello, who developed a crush on her as soon as he saw her shortly before the Krang first attempted to abduct April as part of their experiments.

=== Rise of the Teenage Mutant Ninja Turtles (2018) ===
April O'Neil has been changed into a streetwise teenage girl in the 2018 cartoon, Rise of the Teenage Mutant Ninja Turtles. She is voiced by Kat Graham, and is now mixed race in ethnicity. This version of April also performs a variety of odd jobs around New York while helping the turtles in any way she can. In Rise of the Teenage Mutant Ninja Turtles: The Movie, April starts going to college studying journalism similar to previous portrayals.

=== Tales of the TMNT (2024) ===
April appears in Tales of the Teenage Mutant Ninja Turtles, a follow-up 2d-animated series sequel to Teenage Mutant Ninja Turtles: Mutant Mayhem, with Ayo Edebiri reprising her role from the latter film.

== Films ==
=== Teenage Mutant Ninja Turtles (1990 film) ===
In the first live-action film, April was played by Judith Hoag. She was a television reporter working for Channel 3 news under Charles "Chuck" Pennington, doing an investigative series on mysterious thefts in New York City whose culprits vanished without a trace. One night while leaving work, she is accosted by teenage thieves in league with the Foot Clan, but the Turtles appear and save her under the cover of darkness. In the aftermath, April discovers and grabs Raphael's lost sai; Raphael soon follows her to retrieve the weapon and saves her again when she is attacked by a group of Foot Ninja in the subway. During the attack, April is knocked unconscious while trying to fight them off with her purse. Unsure what to do with her, Raphael carries her to the Turtles' sewer lair. Though afraid at first, April eventually comes to regard the Turtles and Splinter as friends, even letting them stay in her apartment after the Foot Clan discovered and destroyed their sewer dwellings.

April is fired from her news job after opting to further pursue knowledge of the Foot clan, and the Foot clan attack the turtles at her apartment, prompting April, the Turtles, and Casey Jones to retreat to her family's farmhouse in Northampton, Massachusetts. She keeps a journal documenting their forced sabbatical in addition to drawing sketches of the Turtles. She grows extremely close to the four brothers: Michelangelo, who initially confesses to having a crush on April, later addressing her as "Sis," indicating the role she has come to occupy in the Turtles' family. During their respite, April also develops a kind of love-hate relationship with Casey Jones. By the end of the film, she accepts her attraction to him and in the aftermath of Shredder's defeat as well as getting her job back, April asks Casey for a kiss.

=== Teenage Mutant Ninja Turtles II: The Secret of the Ooze ===
In the sequel, Teenage Mutant Ninja Turtles II: The Secret of the Ooze, April was played by Paige Turco. She provides the Turtles and Splinter with a place to stay after the destruction of their lair in the previous film, and helps them research the company responsible for the mutagen that transformed the Turtles into their present state.

=== Teenage Mutant Ninja Turtles III ===
In Teenage Mutant Ninja Turtles III, Paige Turco reprised her role as April O'Neil. In the film, April is temporally transported to feudal Japan, forcing the Turtles to travel back in time to rescue her.

=== TMNT ===
April was voiced by Sarah Michelle Gellar in the 2007 CGI film TMNT. Following the continuity from the previous films, it appeared that she and Casey Jones were engaged in a genuinely close romance, living together in Casey's apartment, and working for a shipping firm. She found Leonardo in Central America at the start of the film while seeking an artifact for Max Winters. No mention was made of her past as a journalist; instead, she now appears to be involved in archaeology. April takes up several forms of ninjutsu training from Splinter, purchasing a slim black-and-yellow jumpsuit of armor from Japan, and becoming quite skilled in the use of a katana. She demonstrates her combative skills in a one-on-one fight with the far more experienced female ninja Karai.

A collectible booklet packed in with her action figure for the film implies that she had become a master of the katana. The figure itself includes a katana, tonfa, and two shoulder armored pads; this outfit was replicated for the movie. In the film's alternate ending, Casey proposes marriage to April and she accepts. This scene is absent from the final cut of the movie but can be found on the DVD.

=== Teenage Mutant Ninja Turtles (2014 film) and Out of the Shadows ===
April appears in the reboot Teenage Mutant Ninja Turtles with Megan Fox playing the role. During the film, she is again cast as a reporter for Channel 6 News and it is revealed that not only was April's father involved in the creation of the turtles as his experiments created the mutagen that turned them into what they are now, but that the young April (portrayed by Malina Weissman) was responsible for the Turtles and Splinter escaping the destruction of the lab where they were created when she released them into the sewers after the lab was destroyed by her father to prevent Shredder and Eric Sacks getting access to the mutagen.

It was reported there was a filmed but unused scene of a fight within April, Vernon Fenwick, Karai, and The Foot in downtown Manhattan that was cut from the finished film. Will Arnett, who played Vernon, said his character "comes out just at the right moment [and] hits Karai with the gurney and knocks her off balance a little bit. Then April kind of finishes her off."

Fox was given a Golden Raspberry Award for Worst Supporting Actress for her portrayal of O'Neil.

Fox reprised her role in the 2016 sequel Teenage Mutant Ninja Turtles: Out of the Shadows.

=== Teenage Mutant Ninja Turtles: Mutant Mayhem ===
April appears in the 2023 CGI film Teenage Mutant Ninja Turtles: Mutant Mayhem, she is voiced by Ayo Edebiri. She is now portrayed as an overweight teenage black girl who also wears glasses like Donatello and is the love interest to Leonardo. April is depicted as wanting to be a journalist, but is camera shy, resulting in an incident where she vomited and earned the nicknames "April O'Puke" and "Puke Girl" from her classmates. She plays a vital role in the climax where she spreads the message that the Turtles are fighting against Superfly and not with him. In the post-credits scene, she is seen attending prom with Leonardo, though clarifies she is only doing so as a friend. This is the second black iteration of the character since the Rise of the Teenage Mutant Ninja Turtles series, produced by Nickelodeon also in this case. (Note: Attributed to multiple references:)

== Other appearances ==
In the two-part anime Mutant Turtles: Superman Legend, April was voiced by Emi Shinohara. April made a live-action appearance in the TMNT: Coming Out of Their Shells musical tour played by Sherie Rene Scott whose role was to incite the live audience to interact with the stage performers and encourage the Turtles when needed.

=== Video games ===
April has appeared in most of the TMNT video games, usually as the damsel in distress who has been captured by Shredder (or by Karai in case of SNES version of Teenage Mutant Ninja Turtles: Tournament Fighters). In Teenage Mutant Ninja Turtles: Turtles in Time, she kicks the story off with a brief report where Krang steals the Statue of Liberty and later appears in the game ending; she also appears onscreen in the SNES version to encourage the Turtles to fight when the player characters are idle. In Konami's series of TMNT games based on the 2003 cartoon series, April resembles her cartoon counterpart and often shows up in various cutscenes to give advice and advance the plot of the game.

April appears as a playable character in Teenage Mutant Ninja Turtles: Tournament Fighters for the Sega Genesis, where her game character bears little resemblance to the 1987 cartoon likeness. In TMNT: Mutant Melee, April is again a playable character and participates in multi-player battles. She is also a playable character in Ubisoft's Teenage Mutant Ninja Turtles: Smash-Up where she is based on the ninja April from the 2007 film. She also appears in the 2014 film-based game by Activision for the Nintendo 3DS, voiced by Julie Nathanson.

April appears as a playable character in the 2021 fighting game Nickelodeon All-Star Brawl, utilizing her design from the 1987 animated series, voiced by Abby Trott. April is a playable character in Teenage Mutant Ninja Turtles: Shredder's Revenge. In September 2022, April was confirmed to be playable in Nickelodeon Kart Racers 3: Slime Speedway, once again having her likeness taken from the 1987 series. An April skin was added to the Fortnite cosmetic shop in December 2023.

=== Action figures ===
In the TMNT toy lines produced by Playmates Toys, April O'Neil has appeared in several action figure incarnations. The first of these had a limited production run, and lacked a blue stripe on her jumpsuit; it was replaced with a yellow-striped version with greater circulation. An alternate version was released in 1990, with a head sculpt closer to her cartoon incarnation, orange boots, and further modification. Another variation was released in 1993 packaged exclusively with the Channel 6 Newsman vehicle; this April had the same sculpt of the 1990 release although her jumpsuit is green and the boots yellow.

Other notable April figures include the 1992 version, dubbed simply "April" with purple accents on her jumpsuit; "April, the Ravishing Reporter", which was the first such figure to feature rooted hair; "April, the Ninja Newscaster", who came with one of each of the Turtles' signature weapons; and "Mutatin' April", part of the Mutations assortment in which April can transform into a humanoid cat (inspired by the original series' episode "The Cat Woman from Channel Six"). For the 2003 TV series, Playmates introduced two O'Neil figures; a standard sized April with bonus Mouser robots and a miniature April.

There is also an April figure based on her appearance in the 2007 film, wearing her yellow ninja outfit. NECA has released O'Neil figures based on her original Mirage Studios appearance and her appearance in the cartoon series. A figure featuring the likeness of Judith Hoag from the 1990 feature film was released in Fall 2021.
