= TMNT (video game) =

2007 video game

- PAL region Windows cover art
- Developers: Ubisoft Montreal; Ubisoft Quebec (PSP/DS)
- Publisher: Ubisoft
- Composers: Cris Velasco; Sascha Dikiciyan; Jake Kaufman (DS)
- Series: Teenage Mutant Ninja Turtles
- Engine: Jade engine
- Platforms: Microsoft Windows, PlayStation 2, GameCube, Xbox 360, Wii; Nintendo DS; PlayStation Portable
- Release: NA: March 20, 2007; PAL: March 22, 2007; Nintendo DS: NA: March 20, 2007; AU: March 22, 2007; EU: March 23, 2007; Windows: EU: March 13, 2007; NA: March 20, 2007; AU: March 22, 2007
- Genres: Action, platformer beat 'em up
- Modes: Single-player; Multiplayer (PSP/DS)

TMNT is an action video game featuring the Teenage Mutant Ninja Turtles. It was developed by Ubisoft Montreal and published by Ubisoft for Xbox 360, Wii, PlayStation 2, GameCube, Nintendo DS, and PlayStation Portable, as well as for Microsoft Windows on March 20, 2007. It is based on the 2007 film of the same name. A PlayStation 3 port was also planned, and shown at press events, but it was never released.

== Gameplay ==
A screenshot from the home version

The gameplay in TMNT contains many acrobatic segments in the vein of another Ubisoft game series, Prince of Persia. The game features 16 story levels and 16 unlockable challenge levels. The game also features four playable characters, each with their unique fighting style and abilities. The game encourages cooperative gameplay, as the player will have to use each turtle's special abilities to navigate through their environment. The game also includes beat'em up elements where the player must defeat the enemies before continuing the level.

== PSP and DS versions ==
Like their console counterparts, the PSP and DS versions of the game are relatively similar to each other, though each in different ways makes use of the individual system's strengths. Both are based on the same story layout as the console versions and bring the action to the rooftops in New York in a fast-paced acrobatic platformer. The fighting is simplified and less frequent than what is found in the console versions.

== Development ==
Ubisoft secured the rights from Konami, who had produced all the previous TMNT games. The game's creative director Nick Harper said "The TMNT movie is all about the emotions associated with family and teenage angst. We've taken that philosophy and turned it into gameplay mechanics that will be fun and challenging." Ubisoft has stated the focus within the game is "on the four turtle brothers finding out their differences and getting through family problems".

== Reception ==
Reception

Review scores
Publication	Score
Game Informer	7.5/10
GameSpot	6.4/10
IGN	6.0/10 (X360, PS2, PC, GCN); 5.5/10 (DS, PSP, Wii)
Nintendo Power	5/10
Official Nintendo Magazine	54%
Official Xbox Magazine (US)	4.0/10

TMNT received mixed reviews with many critics praising its action platforming, while criticism went to its repetitive combat, bad camera, and lack of multiplayer. IGN gave the GameCube, Xbox 360, PlayStation 2, and PC versions a 6.0 out of 10, saying that the game is "Strictly for the kids". The Wii version was criticized for using very little of the Wii Remote's unique capabilities, since one can only move the remote back and forth to use the turtles' weapons, with the weapons lacking free-direction attacks. When reviewing the Nintendo DS and Wii versions of TMNT, the UK Official Nintendo Magazine commonly compared the two games to the 1989 arcade game of the same name, and even said in a hint guide that "Turtles games were once better". Nintendo Power gave it 5/10, saying "The real shame is that TMNT once had a legacy of good video games-recent titles such as this one have sent that history to the sewers."

As of April 26, 2007, TMNT has sold 1.1 million copies across eight platforms. For the PlayStation 2, it was re-released as part of the "Greatest Hits" label.

== See also ==
- TMNT (Game Boy Advance)
