= Casey Jones (Teenage Mutant Ninja Turtles) =

Fictional character

- Casey Jones; Art by Kevin Eastman

Publication information
- Publisher: Mirage Studios (1985–1995, 2001–2010); Image Comics (1996–1999); IDW Publishing (2011–present)
- First appearance: Raphael: Teenage Mutant Ninja Turtle (April 1985)
- Created by: Kevin Eastman; Peter Laird

In-story information
- Full name: Arnold Bernid "Casey" Jones
- Species: Human
- Partnerships: April O'Neil (love interest/girlfriend/fiancée/wife)
- Notable aliases: Arnold Casey Jones Jr., Casey Arnold Jones
- Abilities: Highly skilled at armed and unarmed combat

Arnold Bernid "Casey" Jones is a fictional character that appears in Teenage Mutant Ninja Turtles comics and related media. Created by Kevin Eastman and Peter Laird, he first appeared in the one-shot, Raphael: Teenage Mutant Ninja Turtle (April 1985). Like the turtles, Casey Jones is a vigilante, and was created as a parody of vigilante characters that were popular in comics at the time. Casey usually has long dark hair, wears an ice hockey mask and cut-off biking gloves, and carries his weapons in a golf bag over his shoulder.

His weapons include various sports equipment, such as baseball bats, ice hockey sticks, golf clubs, cricket bats, and tennis rackets. He becomes a love interest of April O'Neil in most continuities.

The character has been featured in various adaptations, and has been portrayed by several actors. He was first voiced by Pat Fraley in the 1987 series, Marc Thompson in the 2003 series, Chris Evans in the 2007 film, Josh Peck in the 2012 series, and Haley Joel Osment in the 2022 film adaptation of the 2018 series, in which Zelda Williams also voiced Cassandra "Casey" Jones, a Foot Clan recruit who was intended to be a female iteration of the character, and has been portrayed in live-action by Elias Koteas in the 1990 and 1993 films and by Stephen Amell in the 2016 film.

== Comic books ==
Casey Jones, as he appeared in Teenage Mutant Ninja Turtles #10 (April 1989 Mirage Studios). Art by Kevin Eastman and Peter Laird.

=== Mirage Studios ===
I had this idea; it was kind of a parody of all these vigilante characters that were in comics. You have the classics like Batman and Daredevil and all these characters where something tragic happened in their past that helped them choose the path to go out and fight crime on their own, and I thought it was really funny if we had a character who was inspired to do the same, but just from watching too much bad TV, like T. J. Hooker and A-Team and all that stuff. So I came up with the idea of this character who would be called Casey Jones and he would have two bats as his main weapon, and he would wear a hockey mask and sweats – just something he cobbled together. And at the last minute, Pete said, "Well why don't you give him a golf bag and he'll have all kinds of weapons in it?" And I'm like, "Dude, that's it!" But that's the kind of collaboration we had; it was always that kind of spontaneity, and how so many of the characters came together. But Casey and Raphael – they're fun. And they're a little retarded like me [laughs].

— Kevin Eastman in May 2009

In the original Mirage series, Casey first appeared in the Raphael one-shot, by Kevin Eastman and Peter Laird. Casey was introduced as a violent, hot-tempered vigilante whose anger concerned even Raphael. The turtle stopped Casey from killing some muggers, causing an initial conflict between the two. This clash was quickly resolved, and Casey and Raphael became fast friends. Later, Casey came to the turtles' aid when they are attacked by the Shredder in April O'Neil's home. The vigilante even took the turtles to his grandmother's old farmhouse in Northampton, cementing his place with the group.

In the Mirage series, Casey is extremely violent, even more so than Raphael, but he mellows throughout the course of the series. In Shades of Gray, Casey accidentally kills a teenager who tried to mug him. The incident sent him into a drunken spiral, damaging his relationship with April O'Neil. His initial homicidal tendencies are especially present in his first appearance, although he never actually murders anyone in that instance.

During the three-part episode City at War, Casey leaves the farmhouse and begins to drive to Los Angeles, planning to find April, but instead meets a pregnant woman named Gabrielle with whom he falls in love and marries. Gabrielle dies during childbirth and Casey is left to take care of her daughter, whom he names Shadow. After spreading Gabrielle's ashes, Casey returns to New York with Shadow to stay with his mother. In a chance encounter, Casey is reunited with April when she comes to buy the apartment building owned by Casey's mother. During this meeting it is revealed that Casey's real name is Arnold but prefers to use his middle name only.

Casey repairs his relationship with April and they begin dating. By volume four, he and April are married, raising Shadow as their daughter and trying to have a child of their own. April eventually leaves Casey and Shadow when April learns that she is a living drawing that was brought to life by a magic crystal. As April comes to terms with herself in Alaska, Casey takes to the nightclubs to drown his sorrows. He meets up with the Foot Clan leader Karai at one of these clubs and, after a few drinks, awakens at Karai's retreat with no memory of the night before, although Karai knows something of what had happened. This plotline was left unresolved as the fourth volume ended.

=== IDW Comics ===
In the TMNT series released by IDW Publishing, Casey is a young college scholarship holder. Following his mother's death from cancer, his father, formerly Hun of the Purple Dragons, became an alcoholic thug who would vent his daily frustration on his son. On one such occasion, Casey is saved from another violent beating by Raphael, who at this time is living a solitary life as a street vagrant unaware that he has a family searching for him. The two quickly become fast friends and fellow vigilantes until Raphael is reunited with his family, at which point Casey meets and befriends the other three turtles as well. He later meets April when she becomes his tutor, and introduces her to the turtles. After an especially violent beating by his father, Casey comes to live with the turtles, while his father returns to the Purple Dragons.

== In other media ==
Casey Jones as depicted in Rise of the Teenage Mutant Ninja Turtles: The Movie.

=== Television ===
- Casey Jones appears in Teenage Mutant Ninja Turtles (1987), voiced by Pat Fraley. This version is a crazed vigilante with a Dirty Harry-like persona, who goes after all sorts of criminals, from robbers to litterers. He never takes off his mask on screen, even when once going undercover in a business suit.
- Casey Jones appears in Ninja Turtles: The Next Mutation (1997). He is portrayed by Nelson Lee.
- Casey Jones appears in Teenage Mutant Ninja Turtles (2003), voiced by Marc Thompson. This version displays a vendetta against the Purple Dragon gang, who killed his father. Additionally, Casey and the Turtles met when they were children, with the latter having been disguised as humans.
- Casey Jones appears in Teenage Mutant Ninja Turtles (2012), voiced by Josh Peck. This version is initially a hockey player who April O'Neil tutors in school. He later becomes a vigilante and ally to the Turtles, specifically Raphael, who becomes his best friend.
- An original, female incarnation of Casey Jones named Cassandra Jones appears in Rise of the Teenage Mutant Ninja Turtles (2018), voiced by Zelda Williams. This version is a member of the Foot Clan. Additionally, Casey Jones himself appears in Rise of the Teenage Mutant Ninja Turtles: The Movie, voiced by Haley Joel Osment. This version is Cassandra's son from the year 2044.

=== Film ===
- Casey Jones appears in Teenage Mutant Ninja Turtles (1990), portrayed by Elias Koteas. This version is a former professional ice hockey player who became a vigilante after sustaining a career-ending injury.
- Casey Jones appears in Teenage Mutant Ninja Turtles III (1993), portrayed again by Elias Koteas.
- Casey Jones appears in TMNT (2007), voiced by Chris Evans. In this version he is in a relationship with April O'Neil and works for her shipping company as a delivery man.
- Casey Jones appears in Teenage Mutant Ninja Turtles: Out of the Shadows (2016), portrayed by Stephen Amell. This version is a hot-headed prison guard and aspiring detective.

=== Video games ===
- Casey Jones makes minor appearances in Teenage Mutant Ninja Turtles: Manhattan Missions (1991), rescuing the Turtles if they lose all their health.
- Casey Jones appears as a playable character in Teenage Mutant Ninja Turtles: Tournament Fighters (1993).
- Casey Jones appears as a boss and unlockable playable character in Teenage Mutant Ninja Turtles (2003).
- Casey Jones appears as an unlockable alternate costume for Raphael in Teenage Mutant Ninja Turtles 2: Battle Nexus (2004).
- Casey Jones appears in Teenage Mutant Ninja Turtles 3: Mutant Nightmare (2005).
- Casey Jones appears as a playable character in TMNT: Mutant Melee (2005).
- Casey Jones appears as a playable character in Teenage Mutant Ninja Turtles: Smash-Up (2009), voiced again by Marc Thompson.
- Casey Jones appears in Teenage Mutant Ninja Turtles: Danger of the Ooze (2014), voiced again by Josh Peck.
- Casey Jones appears as an unlockable playable character in Teenage Mutant Ninja Turtles: Shredder's Revenge (2022), voiced by Darren Worts.
- Casey Jones appears as a playable character in Teenage Mutant Ninja Turtles: Splintered Fate (2023) via the "Junkyard Jam" DLC, voiced by Ben Lepley.
- Casey Jones appears as an unlockable costume in Fortnite (2025).
