= TMNT: Mutant Melee =

2005 video game

- North American Windows cover art
- Developer: Konami Computer Entertainment Hawaii
- Publisher: Konami
- Series: Teenage Mutant Ninja Turtles
- Engine: RenderWare
- Platforms: GameCube, Windows, Xbox, PlayStation 2
- Release: GameCube, Windows, Xbox: NA: March 15, 2005; PlayStation 2: PAL: October 14, 2005
- Genre: Fighting
- Modes: Single-player, multiplayer

TMNT: Mutant Melee is a 2005 fighting video game developed by Konami. It is based on the 2003 Teenage Mutant Ninja Turtles animated series.

== Plot ==
Though the game does not offer a main plot for the primary cast, Adventure Story is the single-player option in which the player chooses a character to follow in a battle-to-battle style story with written synopsis between battles and tasks as they attempt to reach their ultimate goal. The mode presents offshoot routes that allow you to choose different challenges and battles as you proceed.

During progression, the player gathers token currency which can unlock extra content in the Library menu area.

== Gameplay ==
King of the Hill gameplay

Up to 22 playable characters can be unlocked. There are four game modes: In "Last Man Standing", the goal is to be the last living player. "Knock Out" challenges the player to KO the most players in a set time or to reach a set amount of KOs first. The goal of "King of the Hill" is to earn a set number of points by standing in the light beam that moves to set places on the map. Finally, "Keep Away" tasks players with carrying a chest to gain points; while carrying the chest, players are unable to attack and must run away from the other players or risk dropping the chest when hit.

== Reception ==
Reception

Aggregate score
Aggregator	Score
Metacritic	(GC) 44/100 (Xbox) 43/100 (PC) 34/100

Review scores
Publication	Score
GameSpot	4.3/10
GameSpy	1.5/5
GameZone	(Xbox) 5.7/10 (GC) 5.5/10
IGN	5.5/10
Nintendo Power	(GC) 2.1/5
Nintendo World Report	(GC) 5/10
Official Xbox Magazine (US)	(Xbox) 3.8/10
TeamXbox	(Xbox) 5/10
X-Play	1/5

The game received "unfavorable" reviews on all platforms according to the review aggregation website Metacritic.
