= Sophia Crawford =

Sophia Crawford may refer to:

- Sophia Crawford (novelist) (1799–1878), Irish novelist
- Sophia Crawford (stuntwoman) (born 1966), English stuntwoman.
