= Dinosaur King (TV series) =

Japanese anime television series

- Also known as: Kodai Ōja Kyōryū Kingu Dī Kizzu Adobenchā: Yokuryū Densetsu (S2)
- 古代王者恐竜キング Dキッズ・アドベンチャー
- Created by: Kenji Kanno (Sega)
- Developed by: Yasushi Hirano
- Directed by: Katsuyoshi Yatabe
- Music by: Yuhko Fukuda
- Country of origin: Japan
- Original language: Japanese
- No. of seasons: 2
- No. of episodes: 79 (list of episodes)

Production
- Production companies: Nagoya TV; Sega; Sunrise (Note: As of 2015, its copyright was transferred to Bandai Namco Pictures.); Asatsu-DK

Original release
- Network: ANN (Nagoya TV, TV Asahi)
- Release: February 4, 2007 – August 31, 2008

Related
- Manga
- Written by: Yohei Sakai
- Published by: Shogakukan
- English publisher: NA: Viz Media
- Magazine: CoroCoro Comic
- Original run: February 2006 – October 2007
- Volumes: 2

Dinosaur King (Japanese: 古代王者恐竜キング Dキッズ・アドベンチャー, Hepburn: Kodai Ōja Kyōryū Kingu Dī Kizzu Adobenchā) is a Japanese anime television series based on the arcade game Dinosaur King by Sega. Produced by Sunrise, the series aired on Nagoya TV, TV Asahi and their affiliates from February 4, 2007, to January 27, 2008, for 49 episodes. A sequel, titled Kodai Ōja Kyōryū Kingu Dī Kizzu Adobenchā: Yokuryū Densetsu (古代王者 恐竜キング Dキッズ・アドベンチャー 翼竜伝説)aired from February 3 to August 31, 2008, for 30 episodes. Outside of Japan, both series were collected together under the Dinosaur King name by 4Kids Entertainment.

== Cast ==
Character	Voice actor	English voice actor
Max Taylor	Megumi Matsumoto	Veronica Taylor
Rex Owen	Matsuri Mizuguchi	Sebastian Arcelus
Zoe Drake	Tomoko Kobashi	Kether Donohue

== Plot ==
=== First season ===
Max Taylor is the son of paleontologist Dr. Spike Taylor. After falling out of bed early one morning and witnessing a meteor fall from the sky, Max sets out with his friends Rex Owen and Zoe Drake into a forest where the meteor had crashed. They find stones with the symbols for lightning, wind, and grass on them and a card with a picture of a Triceratops on it. The Triceratops that is later named Chomp is accidentally activated when Max rubs the card on the stone. The D-Team meet their new enemies in the Alpha Gang consisting of Dr. Z, Ursula, Zander, Ed, Seth, Laura, Rod, Helga, and the Alpha Droids. The Alpha Gang plans to obtain the Dinosaur Cards that were lost when their time machine exploded and stranded them in the present. Rex activated a Carnotaurus card which was named Ace and Zoe activated a Parasaurolophus which was named Paris. The D-Team and Alpha Gang often clash for possession of dinosaurs that are activated when their cards are activated. In the finale, Seth turns on his comrades with his Black Tyrannosaurus which is ultimately defeated. Seth attempts to bring Chomp back to the past which fails and Seth is sent into the past alone. The D-Team surrender their dinosaurs to Rex's original parents, with many tears.

=== Second season ===
In the second series, the Alpha Gang and the Ancients return. While the parents are talking, they are kidnapped by Gavro, a member of the Spectral Space Pirates. This causes the Alpha Gang and D-Team to join forces against the Space Pirates in their plot to obtain cosmic jewels known as the Cosmos Stones. Seth later returns as an ally to the Spectral Space Pirates after they saved him from the time portal. Spectre, the leader of the Space Pirates, provides the dinosaur cards. In episode 75, Seth seems to become a traitor as he appeals to the D-Team for help saying that they forced him to help them, but it was really a trick to get the two Cosmos Stones in D-Team's control, despite the fact that he attacks and defeats his comrades two episodes later. In the end although the Spectral Space Pirates manage to catch all seven Cosmos Stones, Seth and the Pterosaur defeat the Black Pterosaur. Rex, his parents, and the Alpha Gang leave to their own time as the Spectral Space Pirates are floating around in a pod.

== Production ==
On September 13, 2006, Sega confirmed that a anime television series based on Dinosaur King was in production.

Produced by Sunrise, the series premiered on Nagoya TV, TV Asahi and their affiliates on February 4, 2007. On August 29, 2007, it was revealed that 4Kids Entertainment acquired the rights to the show in North America and all other territories outside of Asia from Sunrise and set a Fall 2007 premiere on the Fox network in the US during 4KidsTV with Funimation Entertainment planning to release DVDs for the series. 4Kids handled global sales and also presold the show to local broadcasters internationally such as France Télévisions and Canal J (France), RTL2 (Germany), TV 2 (Denmark), Jetix (the UK/Ireland, Scandinavia, Spain, Latin America and Brazil), TVI (Portugal), Mediaset (Italy) among others.

A second season was announced on December 17, 2007, with the cast and staff returning from the original series.

Reruns of the series began airing on KidsClick from February 5 to August 24, 2018. Physical media distribution in North America was handled first by Shout! Factory for three 5-episode DVD volumes from September 23, 2008, to June 30, 2009. Discotek Media released the series on two SD Blu-ray sets for each season on November 27, 2018. After its airing, the anime received a range of mixed to positive reviews from critics.

== Marketing ==
=== Merchandise ===
In July 2008, 4Kids appointed Playmates Toys as the global master toy licensee for the series (outside of Japan, where it was handled there by Sega Toys) and Upper Deck as the licensee for the trading card game respectively.
