= WMAC Masters =

- Genre: Sport
- Created by: Carlin West; Alfred Kahn
- Developed by: Kathy Borland; Norman Grossfeld
- Written by: Norman Grossfeld
- Directed by: Isaac Florentine
- Presented by: Shannon Lee
- Starring: Herb Perez; Hakim Alston; Ho-Sung Pak; Chris Casamassa; Jamie Webster; Christine Bannon Rodrigues; Johnny Lee Smith; Erik Betts; Richard Branden; Sophia Crawford; Hien Nguyen; Ho-Young Pak; Mer-Mer Chen; Michael Bernardo; Akihiro Yuji Noguchi
- Theme music composer: John Siegler / John Leffler
- Composer: Rave
- Country of origin: United States
- Original language: English
- No. of seasons: 2
- No. of episodes: 26

Production
- Executive producers: Alfred Kahn; Norman J. Grossfeld; Frank Ward; Pat Johnson
- Producers: Norman J. Grossfeld; Kathy Borland
- Production locations: Universal Studios Florida, Universal Orlando Resort
- Editors: Bill Freda; Meredith Page
- Production companies: 4Kids Productions; Renaissance Atlantic Entertainment; (season 1)

Original release
- Network: First-run syndication
- Release: September 16, 1995 – 1997

WMAC Masters is an American television show produced by Norman Grossfeld featuring choreographed martial arts fights. It was created and produced by 4Kids Productions (later known as 4Kids Entertainment) in conjunction with Renaissance Atlantic Entertainment (best known as the co-producers of the Saban's Power Rangers franchise), and syndicated by The Summit Media Group (4Kids and Summit Media were divisions of licensing agency Leisure Concepts Inc., later becoming the now-defunct 4Licensing Corporation).

The show, while featuring real martial arts by trained martial artists, depicted a fantasy setting using fictional episodic stories, with each episode relating a life lesson. Battles were fought on elaborate closed sets, with an omniscient narrator, on-screen scoring and health gauges, giving the show a feel of a cinematic live-action video game.

WMAC stands for the fictional World Martial Arts Council, where the best martial artists compete for the ultimate prize, the Dragon Star. The Dragon Star is a gold trophy that looks like a shuriken surrounded by a dragon; it was proof that its holder was the best martial artist in the world.

The show lasted for two seasons, from 1995 to 1997. The first season was hosted by Shannon Lee, the daughter of martial artist Bruce Lee and the sister of actor Brandon Lee. In season 2, Shannon Lee was no longer the host, and the show focused more on fantasy and less on real-life issues.

== Quest for the Dragon Star ==
=== Form demonstrations ===
Many episodes featured masters doing demonstrations, with some demonstrations being known as "Master Blaster" competitions. Some were done to inaugurate a new Master (such as Hien "Tsunami" Nguyen ("Man Without Sight"), Tracy "Tracer" Swedom ("Army of One"), and Carmichael "Kid Carmichael" Simon ("Flight of Freedom"). Others included:

- Wind, Earth & Ice: Jamie "Great Wolf" Webster broke a WMAC record held by Chris "Red Dragon" Casamassa, which was successfully breaking 2 large ice blocks (weighing in at a total of 600 pounds) stacked on top of each other. Just before that feat, he broke a slab of Indian red stone while clenching a raw egg in his hand without breaking it.
- Table of Terror: Erik "Panther" Betts balanced himself above a bed of 900 razor-sharp nails.
- Rite of Passage: Willie "Bam" Johnson did his form with his son, Lil Bam, as a rite of passage ritual.
- Herb "Olympus" Perez did one to test out his new weapon, the **Disk Launcher**.
- Richard "Yin Yang Man" Branden demonstrated the **Ancient Weapons of Wushu**.
- Fire & Ice: Martial Arts Extreme: Tsunami performed the "Volcano Walk" (walking barefoot on flaming hot coals) before freezing himself and a bucket of water in a cryogenic chamber; the water turned to a solid block of ice, which Tsunami then broke with his bare fist.
- Michael "Turbo" Bernardo and Ho Young "Star Warrior" Pak demonstrated a "**Speed Breaking**" contest to settle a few weeks-long dispute (which in the end was won by Star Warrior).

=== Preliminary matches and Battledome finals ===
In most episodes, it begins with 4 combatants, 2 of them fight in 2 separate matches. They fight in the Battlezones against ninjas. After a short melee with the ninjas, depending on your health gauge, the fighters will fight each other until one of them is the victor. (In rare instances, if the fighters fight each other long enough that there is no winner yet, the ninjas will re-emerge).

The two combatants who win their respective preliminary matches will face off in the "Battledome". The match lasts 2 minutes. The fighters each try to force the opponent into the cage wall. If successful, the fighter will get points, and the opponent will receive a mild electric shock. The higher the points, the better chance of winning. Ninjas will invade the cage during the match, and if a ninja forces one of the fighters into the cage, the opponent gets the point. Also, if a fighter chooses to hold on to the cage after being knocked into it, no scoring can take place until he lets go. In case of a tie, the fighters will compete in sudden death. The winner will receive the opponent's "Ki-Symbol" and have it placed on their "Dragon Belt".

=== Super Challenges and 4-man Battledome finals ===
In other episodes, 6 masters take part in what was called a "Super Challenge." One at a time, they would compete in separate battlezones against a group of ninjas in 45 seconds of time, and would be scored at the end of the time period. Each master would earn 2 points for a hit against a ninja and 5 points for knocking the ninja down, but would lose points if he was hit or knocked down himself. The 4 top-scoring combatants move onto the Battledome in a 2-minute free-for-all match with the same rules as the regular matches (score points by knocking the opponent onto the cage wall), with the winner receiving 3 Ki-Symbols, one from each of the defeated opponents. No ninjas would participate in this sort of Battledome match, but Sudden Death rules still applied in case of a tie at the end of the match.

Only three of these were ever held, one in the first season and two in the second season. Before the start of the first Super Challenge, Olympus, the Dragon Star champion at the time, was asked to demonstrate a Ninja Challenge. He would be surrounded by ninjas in the WMAC Arena, where he would then proceed to battle them for the 45 seconds. Once the demonstration was finished, the real challenge began.

Challenge 1 results, including the Battlezones fought in and the final ranking going into the 4-Man Battledome Finals, were as follows (in order of appearance. Those that moved on to the 4-Man Battledome Finals are in bold print):

- Red Dragon (Mayan Mystery): 92 points. Final rank: 5th place
- **Tsunami (WMAC Arena): 101 points. Final rank: 3rd place**
- **Great Wolf (WMAC Arena): 126 points. Final rank: 1st place**
- **Warlock (WMAC Arena): 102 points. Final rank: 2nd place**
- Tiger Claw (Mayan Mystery): 90 points. Final rank: Last place
- **Panther (WMAC Arena): 97 points. Final rank: 4th place**

Battledome Finals Winner: Tsunami. Final score: Great Wolf 1, Warlock 1, Tsunami 4, Panther 1.

Challenge 2 results:

- **Yin Yang Man (Mayan Mystery): 79 points. Final rank: 3rd place**
- **Turbo (Mayan Mystery): 77 points. Final rank: 4th place**
- Great Wolf (Ghost Town): 73 points. Final rank: 5th place
- **Star Warrior (Mayan Mystery): 91 points. Final rank: 1st place**
- Bam (Ghost Town): 72 points. Final rank: Last place
- **Olympus (Pressure Pit): 80 points. Final rank: 2nd place**

Battledome Finals Winner: Turbo, by Sudden Death. Final score: Olympus 2, Yin Yang Man 3, Star Warrior 0, Turbo 3. (Note: With Turbo and Yin Yang Man tied at the end of regulation, Olympus and Star Warrior were told to leave the dome, so the other two could conclude the match under Sudden Death rules. Turbo came out the victor.)

Challenge 3 results:

- Great Wolf (Ghost Town): 75 points. Final rank: 5th place
- Kid Carmichael (Doom City): 74 points. Final rank: Last place
- **The Machine (Ghost Town): 92 points. Final rank: 1st place**
- **Tsunami (Ghost Town): 88 points. Final rank: 2nd place**
- **Warlock (Doom City): 86 points. Final rank: 3rd place**
- **Tiger Claw (Dark Alley): 86 points. Final rank: 3rd place**

Battledome Finals Winner: Warlock. Final score: The Machine 2, Tsunami 0, Tiger Claw 2, Warlock 3.

NOTE: Great Wolf is the only Master to have taken part in all 3 Ninja Challenges.

=== Dragon Star Matches ===
Once a master achieved Full Dragon Belt status (acquiring 10 opponents' Ki-Symbols), he would compete for the Dragon Star against the champion.

Matches took place atop a rotating platform. If either competitor stepped off the platform at any time, a violation was called and a ninja entered the competition.

Each match continued until one of the two masters was knocked off of the platform. The master left standing was declared Dragon Star Champion and was awarded the star. The defeated master would return to regular competition and attempt to gain enough Ki-Symbols to challenge again.

==== Season 1 ====
The first champion was Turbo, who defeated Yin Yang Man in the inaugural Dragon Star match. Turbo was in turn defeated by Olympus, who was defeated by Superstar.

In the last episode of the first season, Superstar was challenged by the Machine in a match that ended in controversial fashion. One of several ninjas that the masters had forced into the match attacked both men and knocked both of them off the platform simultaneously, leaving the Dragon Star in flux.

==== Season 2 ====
At the beginning of Season 2, it was revealed that WMAC rules did not allow ninjas to win the Dragon Star. It was also discovered that a conspiracy was beginning to brew involving master Warlock and new master Tracer.

To settle the vacancy and crown a new champion, Superstar and the Machine faced off again in a secret area where there would be no interference. The two masters were each given a module with their respective Ki-Symbol on them, with the object being to reach a Dragon Star replica and place their module in its compartment, all while battling themselves and the elements surrounding them. The Machine reached the goal first and won the vacant Dragon Star.

Red Dragon emerged as the next challenger for the Dragon Star and defeated the Machine to claim it. His first defense of the star would come against Warlock, where the conspiracy once again reared itself. Warlock was discovered to have paid off a ninja to not attack him during the course of the contest, instead focusing on the champion. The strategy ultimately backfired and Red Dragon retained the Dragon Star.

The conclusion of the season revealed the truth of the entire matter. Warlock, Tracer, and at least one other master were discovered to have been competitors in a discipline that the WMAC had outlawed due to its connection to illegal activity. Their goal was to procure the Dragon Star by any means, and they were revealed to have been behind the controversial finish to the Dragon Star match from the first-season finale. Once that failed, and once Warlock failed in his quest to win it outright, the corrupt masters simply stole the Dragon Star and left the organization taking the trophy with them. Their partner in crime was revealed to be young master Tsunami.

=== Battlezones ===
There were many different Battlezones for the fighters to compete in, whether they were for preliminaries or for ninja challenges. However, in Season 2, only 5 of these would be used. These battlezones included:

- **Ghost Town** – a traditional ghost town-like setting (presumably in a long-abandoned wild west town), with abandoned buildings and saloons. Tumbleweeds, wagon wheels, and haystacks littered the landscape. Thunder and lightning were a constant presence. This Battlezone took place in the stage for the Wild, Wild, Wild West Stunt Show at Universal Studios Florida.

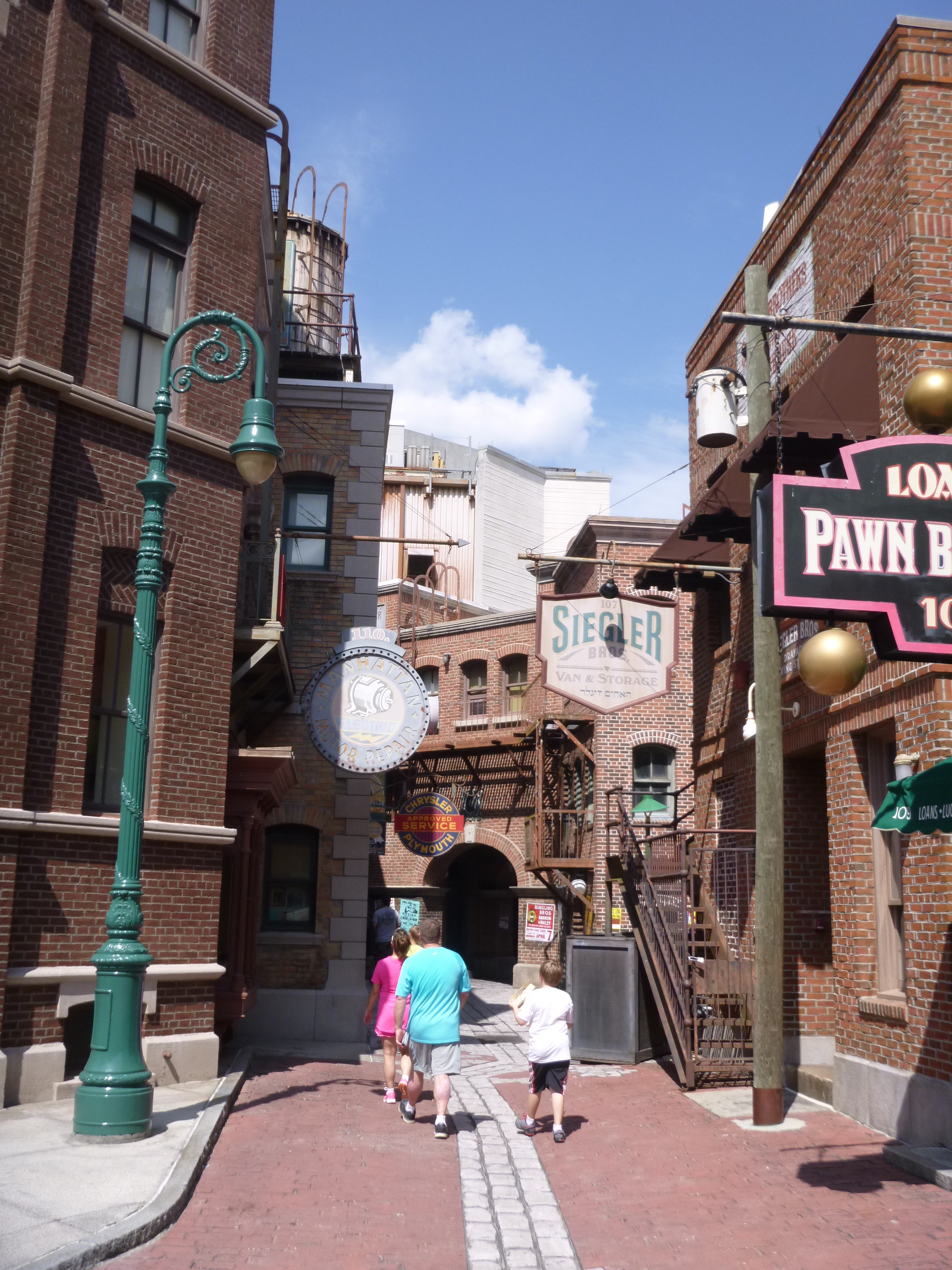
Sting Alley at New York themed area, Universal Studios Florida

- **Doom City** – a city scene with wreckage everywhere (cars, buildings, etc.), and even some burning buildings. Searchlights would roam around the area randomly. This battlezone was actually part of Kongfrontation at Universal Studios Florida.
- **Mayan Mystery** – a Mayan courtyard scene with waterfalls and climbable boulders, including some with Mayan face carvings. This Battlezone took place on the Animal Actors Stage at Universal Studios Florida.
- **Dark Alley** – a city slum scene set in an alleyway, in front of brick buildings which featured many balconies and dumpsters. This Battlezone is actually part of the New York area of Universal Studios Florida.
- **Pressure Pit** – an underground battlezone, located 500 feet below the WMAC Arena, featuring crates and construction; this battlezone gets its name from the fact that the air pressure there can cause one's ears and nose to bleed.
- **Arena Rapid Transit System** (used only for the Dragon Star Rematch) – an underground subway station setting; it featured subway cars entering the station, which transported the ninjas to the battle. It took place in the Earthquake ride at Universal Studios Florida.
- **Stone Valley** – a forest-like setting with many trees and huge boulders, as well as waterfalls and ponds.
- **Nuclear Nightmare** – a battlezone set among nuclear power plants.
- **Danger Dock** – a typical harbor setting right by the river, which has boardwalks, shacks, and a more open courtyard area fit for battle. This battlezone was part of the San Francisco Area of Universal Studios Florida.

NOTE: In Battlezones settings with water hazards, like Mayan Mystery and Danger Dock, if a combatant was knocked into the water during the match, he or she would automatically lose the match.

NOTE 2: Stone Valley, Nuclear Nightmare and Danger Dock were not used in Season 2.

NOTE 3: The Dark Alley battlezone was the only Battlezone that had been rained on during the show's run, despite the constant thundering in Ghost Town. On that occasion, a thunderstorm appeared in the area, which also affected the electrical power in the arena.

=== Ninjas ===
There were many different types of ninjas that appeared in the show, most of them specific to a battlezone, although they would appear in other places, including the Dragon Star matches. According to Shannon Lee, they were all WMAC Academy Cadets who would eventually become Masters; Tsunami and Kid Carmichael were known to be former ninjas. The different kinds of ninjas included the following:

- **Ghost Town** – Ninjas dressed in black garb with a skull-like mask on their faces. They always appeared in the Ghost Town Battlezone. It was this type of ninja that defeated both Superstar and The Machine during the Dragon Star match at the end of Season 1.
- **Kabuki** – Ninjas in black garb with a white-faced, red-cheeked mask on both the front and back of their heads. They appeared in various battlezones in season 1, while in season 2 they only appeared in Doom City.
- **Black** – Ninjas covered in traditional black garb. They appeared in various battlezones throughout the two seasons. They were more frequently used for the 2-man Battledome finals.
- **Blood** – Ninjas covered in red garb. They seldom appeared in battlezones, but they did appear once in Dark Alley, and also in the Rapid Transit during the Dragon Star rematch. In some earlier episodes, they were seen in the women's Battledome finals.
- **Camo** – Ninjas covered in camouflage-colored garb. They always appeared in the Mayan Mystery Battlezone.
- **Hazard** – Ninjas dressed in black and red garb with 2 green stripes, and on their face they wore gas masks. They were introduced in Season 2 and appeared in the Pressure Pit battlezone.
- **Jukido (Hooded Ninjas)** – they were friends of Warlock (who is a member of that group) who haven't appeared in any battlezones. They once ambushed Warlock's brother, Wizard, and gave him a beating until he was saved by Tiger Claw. Jukido also "took out" Panther, hence the latter's absence during season 2 (this part of the storyline was decided when Erik Betts, the actor playing Panther, broke his hip and thus could not appear in further episodes). It is known they are members of Jukido when Tiger Claw pulled one's mask off and found the symbol of Jukido printed on his head. Only one of these ninjas officially appeared in a WMAC Masters competition, that being the Dragon Star match between Red Dragon and Warlock. These ninjas are covered in black garb with a hood on it; the hood is placed over a red-masked face that also seemed to have a black bandanna over the eyes.

=== Special Match: Mixed Doubles ===
On one occasion in Season 2, a male combatant would team up with a female combatant to take on another male/female team in what was called a Mixed Doubles match. In the lone case, Superstar had teamed up with Lady Lightning (as Team Yellow) in order to take on the team of Tracer and Chameleon (as Team Red). The match took place in the Doom City battlezone, where they also had to fend off a group of Kabuki Warriors. It was just like a regular preliminary match, but there would be only one health gauge for each team, meaning that the two members of each team were competing as one. Team Yellow emerged victorious, and for their victory, they received the Ki-Symbols of their defeated opponents (Superstar getting Tracer's Ki-Symbol and Lady Lightning getting Chameleon's).

=== Past Dragon Star Champions ===
(In order in which they have held the title until someone beat them for it)

Male

- Turbo
- Olympus
- Superstar
- The Machine
- Red Dragon

NOTE: Yin Yang Man was also a contender and he challenged Turbo for the title (hence the reason that Yin Yang Man was starting on his second Dragon Belt when the series started), but Turbo defeated him. Similarly, Warlock was a contender who challenged champion Red Dragon, but Red Dragon won the match.

Female

- Tarantula
- Lady Lightning
- Black Widow
- Chameleon (if that is, the Dragon Star were to ever be found after being stolen)

NOTE: Baby Doll was the only female master in the series to lose the Dragon Star match as a contender. Lady Lightning, who was practically a dominant force in season 1 in the women's division, had successfully defended her title against Baby Doll. But it was revealed in season 2 that Lady Lightning was defeated by Black Widow. Black Widow is the only ever champion, male or female, to have willingly relinquished her Dragon Star, which then caused 3 competitors – namely, Lady Lightning, Princess, and Chameleon – to be automatically eligible to compete in a Dragon Star match.

== Ki-Symbols ==
Each WMAC Master has a Ki-Symbol. A Ki-Symbol is the reflection of the soul of the combatant. For example, Herb Perez's Ki-Symbol is Olympus because he won the gold medal in Tae Kwon Do at the 1992 Summer Olympics. The Ki-Symbol reminds many of the mask of a Luchador because both reflect the heart and soul of the wearer. Other examples include:

Red Dragon: Chris Casamassa's father is the founder of Red Dragon Karate.

Mouse: As a child, Michele Krasnoo was known for her high-pitched kiais.

Great Wolf: Jamie Webster's real-life Native American name translates to "Great Wolf."

Bam: Willie Johnson gets this nickname from shouting "Bam" in his kiais.

Superstar: Ho Sung Pak's name, in his native Korean, means "Superstar."

Baby Doll: Bridgett Riley's father, a movie stuntman, gave her this nickname when she was a child.

Yin Yang Man: Richard Branden's hobby is sketching variations on the ancient Chinese "yin-yang" symbol.

Striking Eagle: Taimak's name means "Striking Eagle" in the Aztec language.

== Cast of Characters ==
Many of the WMAC Masters, including Richard Branden, Erik Betts, Hien Nguyen, Sophia Crawford, Yuji Noguchi, Mer-Mer Chen and Bridgett Riley, were former and then-current stunt people for Power Rangers. In fact, one, Mike Chaturantabut, would actually later become a Power Ranger, in Power Rangers Lightspeed Rescue. Noguchi was one of the main stunt coordinators for Power Rangers until the franchise was bought by Disney. Other Masters are tied to Mortal Kombat, Batman & Robin, Shootfighter and the Teenage Mutant Ninja Turtles movies and series. Hakim Alston (The Machine) made a few appearances in The New Adventures of Robin Hood, playing the role of Kemal, Nomad Warrior; Crawford (Chameleon) also made an appearance on the show. Clayton Barber, Riley, Betts, Chaturantabut and Casamassa also appeared in the series Martial Law. Other movies that featured several WMAC Masters are GI Joe, Watchmen, Catwoman, Avatar, Last Airbender, Book of Swords, Fist of the Warrior, xXx²: The Next Level, Torque, Windtalkers, Time Machine, Down With Love, Sci-Fighter, US Seals 2, Urban Justice, Blood and Bone, Poseidon, Johnny Tao, Fast Five, Savate, Drive, Gedo, Red Skies, 18 Fingers of Death!, Ant-Man, and Ides of March. Betts also competed on a season 6 episode of American Gladiators in early 1995.

Despite the show's scripted and choreographed nature, its competitors were legitimate martial artists. At least two of the cast members could lay legitimate claim to being among the world's best martial artists: both Herb Perez and Lynnette Love won Olympic gold medals in taekwondo, Perez a gold in the 1992 Summer Olympics, and Love a gold at the 1988 Summer Olympics in addition to a bronze medal in 1992. Riley and Christine Bannon-Rodrigues were both competitive kickboxers, with Bannon-Rodrigues winning gold medals in the WAKO Amateur World Championship in 1991 and 1993. Several of the other performers held multiple black belts in multiple disciplines.

(Note: With the exception of Michael M. Foley, who portrayed "Tracy Swedom" (ki-symbol: "Tracer"), all actors on this list played themselves, with their ki-symbols being an element created for the show.)

=== Dragon Star Masters ===
- Hakim Alston – The Machine
- Richard Branden – Yin Yang Man
- Chris Casamassa – Red Dragon
- Mike Chaturantabut – Wizard (Season 2)
- Mer-Mer Chen – Princess
- Marco Johnson – Little Bam (Episode 2.8)
- Willie Johnson – Bam (referred to in season 1 as The Bam)
- Michelle Krasnoo – Mouse (Episode 1.3)
- Herb Perez – Olympus
- Ho Sung Pak – Superstar
- Ho Young Pak – Star Warrior
- Christine Bannon-Rodrigues – Lady Lightning
- Johnny Lee Smith – Tiger Claw
- Jamie Webster – Great Wolf
- Sophia Crawford – Chameleon (Season 2)
- Lynnette Love – Tarantula (Episode 1.5)
- Akihiro "Yuji" Noguchi – Cyclone (Season 2)
- Tiana Noguchi – Black Widow (Season 2)
- Bridgett Riley – Baby Doll (Season 1, with only one appearance in Season 2)
- Carmichael Simon – Kid Carmichael (announcer referred to him as only "Kid" in season 2; though his full nickname was still displayed on screen)
- Michael Bernardo – Turbo
- Erik Betts – Panther (Season 1)
- Hien Nguyen – Tsunami
- Taimak Guarriello – Striking Eagle (Episode 2.6)
- Unknown Actor – The Rat (Episode 2.6)

NOTE: "Star Warrior" and "Superstar" are real-life siblings. "Warlock" and "Wizard", however, are not. "Black Widow" and "Cyclone" aren't real-life siblings, despite having the same surname.

=== Jukido Masters ===
- Erik Betts – Panther (Season 1, implied)
- Larry Lam – Warlock
- Hien Nguyen – Tsunami (double-agent)
- Michael M. Foley (Tracy Swedom) – Tracer (Season 2)

=== Others ===
- Steve Boyles - Steve, the kickboxer (The Machine's rival) (Season 1 Episode 1)
- Dave Morizot - John O., the stuntman/gang leader (Season 1 Episode 2)
- Tracy Fleming - Gang member (Season 1 Episode 2)
- Neil Brown Jr. – Jake (Season 1 Episode 3)
- Sheri Cook - Nicole, the astronaut (Red Dragon's crush) (Season 1 Episode 5)
- John Medlen - Baby Doll's father (Season 1 Episode 9)
- Billy Hines (extra)
- Randy Vaughn - Himself/Wheelchair Kata (Episode 1.10)
- Don Dino - Referee
- David "Fang" Yuen - Fight official
- Norman Grossfeld - Computer voice announcer (Season 2; used as primary announcer following the departure of Shannon Lee)

== Martial Arts Disciplines/Fighting Styles ==
=== Goju-Ryu ===
- Striking Eagle

=== Hapkido ===
- Black Widow

=== Judo ===
- Rat

=== Karate ===
- Cyclone
- Great Wolf
- Mouse
- Red Dragon

=== Kenpo ===
- Lady Lightning

=== Kickboxing ===
- Baby Doll
- The Machine

=== Kodan-Kan ===
- Tracer

=== Kung-Fu ===
- Chameleon
- Star Warrior
- Superstar
- Tsunami
- Warlock
- Wizard

=== Shorin-Ryu ===
- Tiger Claw
- Turbo

=== Tae Kwon Do ===
- The Machine
- Olympus
- Tarantula

=== Tang Soo Do ===
- Mouse

=== Wushu ===
- Bam
- Kid Carmichael
- Panther
- Princess
- Star Warrior
- Yin Yang Man

== The Dragon Star ==
The Dragon Star represents the greatest martial artist in the world. The 8 Points of the Dragon Star represented the 8 points on how a true martial artist would live. The 8 Points are: Discipline, Courage, Forgiveness, Compassion, Honor, Wisdom, Loyalty and Respect.

In Season 2, members of Jukido were banned by the WMAC for not following the Code of the Dragon Star, but some members managed to infiltrate the competition. At end of the Season 2 finale, Hien Nguyen (Tsunami) stole the Dragon Star and brought it to a rooftop building where Michael Foley (Tracy "Tracer" Swedom) and Larry Lam (Warlock) were awaiting a helicopter. The WMAC discontinued all competition until the Dragon Star could be recovered.

The Dragon Star was built by Jim King, the same prop maker that built The Machine Body Armor and several of the weapons for the series. The original design of The Machine armor was redesigned by Jim King prior to its fabrication. The new armor design was incorporated into the toy version of The Machine.

== Episodes ==
=== Season 1 (1995) ===
Season 1 involved personal storylines of the WMAC Masters. In the first episode, we were introduced to the masters themselves, and Hakim Alston talked about how he earned his namesake, "The Machine". Throughout the first season, they talked about the highs and lows of the masters, from the feud between Johnny Lee Smith (Tiger Claw) and Jamie Webster (Great Wolf) due to a broken promise, Ho Sung Pak (Superstar) surrendering to his brother Ho Young Pak (Star Warrior) after the latter once saved his life, to Richard Branden's blindness in one eye thus began wearing an eyepatch, to Hien Nguyen (Tsunami) overcoming the odds and winning 3 Ki-Symbols for his once-empty Dragon Belt, winning a bet he had with Superstar. Superstar then got a chance to challenge Olympus in a special double Dragon Star match where he won and became the new Dragon Star Champion. However, the biggest shocker was at the end of season 1 when Hakim Alston and then-Dragon Star Champion Ho Sung Pak (Superstar) got knocked off the rotating pedestal at the same time by a ninja during their Dragon Star match. The conclusion of the match would come at the start of the next season.

Episodes

- 1.1: Meet the Masters: Tsunami learns how the various Masters got their nicknames but the Machine refuses to answer. The Machine eventually reveals that when he was younger, his pride made him go into an all-out fight where he broke his leg, forcing him to change his attitude.
- 1.2: Brothers in Arms: When a match between Superstar and Star Warrior ends oddly, the Machine explains the unique bond the brothers have. Also, Olympus (who is one ki-symbol away from full Dragon Belt status) faces Tsunami in the latter's first match since being promoted to the academy.
- 1.3: Going for Gold: Olympus challenges Turbo for the Dragon Star and shares how he once helped a troubled youth.
- 1.4: Broken Promise: After being knocked out by a move Great Wolf promised never to use on him, Tiger Claw feels anger toward his friend.
- 1.5: A Man Can Dream: Tsunami has a crush on Shannon Lee and Red Dragon shares a story of his own feelings for a female astronaut.
- 1.6: Ninja Challenge: With the first-ever Ninja Challenge offering a chance to win three ki symbols, Tsunami makes a bet with Superstar over his chances with the loser doing a hundred push-ups for each of the other's symbols.
- 1.7: Quest for the Dragon Star: As Kid Carmichael makes his debut, Olympus tells the others of how his quest for advice against Turbo led to a unique lesson.
- 1.8: The Joke's on You: Tired of Warlock's practical jokes, Great Wolf and Baby Doll put chili powder in his glove...only to have an unsuspecting Red Dragon use it for an important match against Superstar, who is seeking full Dragon Belt status.
- 1.9: Double Dragon Star Match: As Superstar defeats Olympus for the Dragon Star, Baby Doll is set to face Lady Lightning but her worries about her past with her father threaten to make her back out.
- 1.10: Blindsided: In a preliminary match, Tsunami uses an illegal move on Yin Yang Man. As the bout is reviewed, the other Masters learn Yin Yang is blind in one eye and he shares how it happened.
- 1.11: Icebreaker: As a storm rages outside, Tiger Claw and Great Wolf face each other for the first time since the breaking of their friendship and are perhaps able to put it back together.
- 1.12: Reaching the Top: The Machine worries over having to face Olympus to reach full Dragon Belt status. Meanwhile, Great Wolf prepares to break a long-standing record on shattering ice.
- 1.13: Showdown: Part 1: The Machine and Superstar go at it for the Dragon Star but the match ends with both defeated by a mysterious masked ninja.

=== Season 2 (1996–97) ===
Season 2 began where season 1 left off. Because both the Machine and Superstar had been knocked off the pedestal by a ninja during the Dragon Star match, neither won the Dragon Star. This became a problem throughout the World Martial Arts Council. To make matters worse, Larry Lam (Warlock) made a pact with the newest master, Tracy Swedom (Tracer) and joined a cult called "Jukido". Jukido was a secret group of martial-arts masters who did not want to follow the code of the Dragon Star; for this, they were banned from the WMAC, so they decided to steal the Dragon Star out of revenge. During the investigation, some of the Masters were accused of being the masked ninja, including Ho Sung Pak's brother, Ho Young Pak (Star Warrior), and former Dragon Star Champion Mike Bernardo (Turbo), but they were all cleared. Another Master, Mike Chaturantabut (Wizard), was found to have the red dragon mark of Jukido, but he had since cut his Jukido ties. Warlock, who turned out to be Wizard's half-brother, was still part of the group, despite all appearances to the contrary.

Dragon Star champion Chris Casamassa (Red Dragon) faced Warlock for the Dragon Star championship. During the match, a hooded Jukido ninja entered the match during a violation and came to Warlock's aid against Red Dragon (Warlock even saved the ninja when the latter almost fell off the rotating platform). Despite the interference, Red Dragon won the match and retained his title. Later, Jamie Webster (Great Wolf) began to have premonitions about the Dragon Star either disappearing or otherwise being a fake and the role Jukido would play in this.

On the women's side, Sophia Crawford (Chameleon) defeated both Mer-Mer Chen (Princess) and Christine Rodrigues (Lady Lightning) to win the Dragon Star. When she went to claim her prize, she found the Dragon Star replaced with red dragon crest of Jukido and screamed in horror, validating Great Wolf's visions. Several of the masters figured out that Tracer and Warlock were behind the theft, and Wizard finally revealed his brother's true motives as well as his own history with Jukido, but the masters were convinced there was a third member of the group. They originally suspected Chameleon of being that third member, but realized that she was innocent; not only was her terror at seeing the Jukido crest instead of the Dragon Star genuine, but Superstar had also previously overheard her reject Tracer's offer to be part of "the team." Jukido members Tracer and Warlock were definitely part of the plot to steal the Dragon Star, but, unbeknownst to all until the very end (and only to the viewers), so was Hien Nguyen (Tsunami); he brought the Dragon Star to a helicopter, where Tracer and Warlock awaited him. Great Wolf's visions, however, portrayed Tsunami as a hero who recovers the Dragon Star for the WMAC, so Tsunami's true role in the plot remains a mystery and a topic for debate amongst the fandom.

Episodes

- 2.1: Showdown: Part 2: The masked ninja escapes before his identity is discovered. As a new Super Challenge is fought, accusations are thrown at Star Warrior. The ending reveals that Warlock and the newest Master, Tracer, are secretly working together to destroy WMAC.
- 2.2: Dragon Star Rematch: Superstar and the Machine's rematch is marred by an earthquake. Meanwhile, the Masters put Star Warrior on trial as the masked ninja.
- 2.3: Ladies' Night: Lady Lightning hopes a new outfit gets her confidence back after losing the Dragon Star. Meanwhile, Star Warrior feels resentment towards his brother, Superstar, for doubting him during the masked ninja controversy.
- 2.4: Fired Up: Red Dragon prepares to go for full Dragon Belt status as Olympus shows off a unique weapon.
- 2.5: Wizard and Warlock: A new Master called Wizard arrives with Warlock revealing him as his estranged brother, whom he tells the Masters is part of an evil martial arts organization known as Jukido; however, Wizard tells the Masters that it's the other way around and that Warlock has been lying to them all. Red Dragon defeats The Machine for the Dragon Star. At the end of the episode, Warlock has Wizard ambushed by ninjas.
- 2.6: Battle of the Brothers: Tiger Claw saves Wizard from his attackers, the man sharing a clue before passing out. Meanwhile, Star Warrior and Superstar overcome their mistrust issues as the other Masters investigate the attackers.
- 2.7: Bad Blood: The issues of the attacks and mistrust cause tension between the Masters, especially during their preliminary matches.
- 2.8: Super Challenge III: Another Super Challenge gives Warlock the chance to attain full Dragon Belt status. Turbo and Star Warrior embark on a series of strange challenges against each other following Turbo's Battledome loss to Star Warrior in the previous episode.
- 2.9: Mixed Doubles: A special match of male/female Masters is made while Warlock challenges Red Dragon for the Dragon Star. Meanwhile, Wizard returns to the WMAC following his brutal Battledome beating at the hands of the Jukido warriors a few weeks ago.
- 2.10: Name of the Game: The Masters play with a program that creates anagrams of names. Star Warrior and Turbo settle their feud while Black Widow reveals she is retiring as Dragon Star champion, perhaps giving Jukido the opening they have been looking for.
- 2.11: Vision of Evil: Part 1: Great Wolf shares a nightmare he had of the Dragon Star being stolen and fears the day's match-ups will prove it true.
- 2.12: Vision of Evil: Part 2: In a special 3-way match, Chameleon wins the Dragon Star but a bizarre statue shows up instead, thus confirming Great Wolf's fears. The Masters finally realize who is behind the plot unfolding all this time, as Wizard finally exposes his brother's true intentions to the Masters.
- 2.13: The Turning Points of the Masters: A recap of the personal flashbacks of the Masters.

== Production ==
The first 13 episodes of the first season cost $5.5 million.

== Cancellation ==
WMAC Masters was cancelled after 2 seasons in 1997. The fate of the Dragon Star remains in the air. However, one last episode did air in 1997 after the end of the show, which was known as "The Turning Points of the Masters"; in this episode, four masters (The Machine, Yin Yang Man, Superstar, and Olympus) told their stories that were their personal "turning points" (these stories were actually all previously shown during episodes of Season 1; the only new footage in this episode was of the Machine as he began to tell his story).

== Release and Merchandising ==
=== Syndication ===
The show originally aired on September 16, 1995. The show was not broadcast for several years following its cancellation. It was shown on the 4Kids TV Saturday morning television programming block from 2002 until 2003. The CW, who operated the Toonzai video-on-demand website (the successor to the TV-based 4Kids TV), hosted all 26 episodes of the series for free streaming on their website before 4Kids Entertainment went bankrupt and Toonzai programming was subsequently cancelled in late 2012. The series has not been syndicated in any medium since the closure of Toonzai's website.

=== Home video ===
Only six episodes from the series have been officially released on home media. All three volumes were released on April 8, 1996, on VHS by Anchor Bay Entertainment and Video Treasures. Each volume contains two episodes: Meet the Masters/Brothers in Arms, Going for Gold/Broken Promise, and Ninja Challenge/Quest for the Dragon Star.

=== Toyrange ===
Bandai America released an action figure and roleplay range based on the show in 1996.
