= The Summit Media Group =

American subsidiary of 4Kids Entertainment

The Summit Media Group Inc.
- Type: Subsidiary
- Industry: Licensing
- Founded: November 1992; 33 years ago
- Defunct: June 24, 2006
- Fate: Closed
- Headquarters: New York City, New York, US
- Key people: Lee Ravdin (CEO); Terez Kiely(Executive vice president)
- Parent: 4Kids Entertainment

The Summit Media Group Inc. was an American New York City based subsidiary of 4Kids Entertainment, and formerly of Leisure Concepts. This subsidiary served print and broadcast media–planning and buying services for clients in the children's toy and game business. Summit was also a television syndication company which distributed a number of children's TV shows for syndication.

== History ==
Along with 4Kids Productions, the Summit Media Group was established by Leisure Concepts in 1992, and later became a subsidiary of the later renamed 4Kids Entertainment in 1995.

On June 24, 2006, 4Kids Entertainment announced that it would be closing the Summit Media Group.

== Executive management ==
=== Chief Executive Officers ===
- Sheldon Hirsch (November 1992 – February 16, 2006)
- Lee Ravdin (February 16, 2006 – June 24, 2006)

== Shows produced and distributed by The Summit Media Group ==
Since its founding in 1992, Summit distributed the following TV shows for syndication:

- Pick Your Brain (1993–1994)
- Mega Man (1994–1995)
- Oscar's Orchestra (1994–1996)
- WMAC Masters (1995–1997)
- Enchanted Tales (1995–1998)
- Darkstalkers (1995)
- Mark's Wired World (1997–1998)
- The Mr. Men Show (1997–1999)
- Van Pires (1997–1998)
- The New Adventures of Voltron (1997–1998)
- Pokémon (1998–1999) (Season 1)
- War Planets (1998–1999)
- RoboCop: Alpha Commando (1998–1999)
- Cubix (2001–2002) (season 1 only)
- Yu-Gi-Oh! (2001–2002) (season 1 only)
- Tama and Friends (2001–2002)

The company also syndicated three specials

- Mr. Magoo's Christmas Carol
- Cinderella on Ice
- Cabbage Patch Kids Presents "Vernon's Christmas"

== Clients of Summit Media ==
- Nintendo
- Capcom
- RoseArt
- Topps
- Thinkway Toys
- XConcepts
- Jakks Pacific
- Big Toys Time
- THQ
- Toy Island
- Spin Master Toys
- Manley Toy Quest
- Trendmasters
- Flying Colors
- 3DO
- Pokémon Center
- Taiyo Edge R/C
