= Michael Bernardo =

Canadian actor

- Occupations: Stuntman, martial artist, actor

Michael "Mike" Bernardo is a Canadian actor, athlete, and coach, as well as a former champion martial artist and stuntman.

Although he found some fame through his roles in Shootfighter and its sequel, and as Turbo on WMAC Masters, he retired from acting to focus more on his chain of martial arts schools known as Bernardo Karate in London, Ontario, Canada.

== Filmography ==
=== Film ===
Year	Title	Role	Notes
1988	Empire of Ash	Head Raider	
1991	Tiger Claws	John's Opponent	
1993	Shootfighter: Fight to the Death	Nick Walker	
1993	Cyber Seeker	Viral #5	
1995	Virtual Combat	Dante	
1996	Shootfighter II	Nick Walker	
1996	Terminal Rush	Bob	
1996	Moving Target	Boris	
1997	Batman & Robin	Ice Thug	

=== Television ===
Year	Title	Role	Notes
1995–1996	WMAC Masters	Turbo / Self	23 episodes
