= List of Dinosaur King episodes =

The following is a list of episodes for the Dinosaur King anime series.

== Series overview ==
Season	Episodes	Originally released	
Season	Episodes	First released	Last released
1	49	February 4, 2007	January 27, 2008
2	30	February 3, 2008	August 31, 2008

== Episode list ==
=== Season 1 ===
No.	English dub title (top) Japanese title (bottom)	Japan (Original airdate)	USA airdate	UK airdate
1	"Prehistory in the Making (part 1 of 2)"; Transliteration: "Gabu is my Friend! My Dinosaur" (Japanese: ガブは友だち!オレの恐竜)	February 4, 2007	September 8, 2007	March 1, 2008
Max, Rex, and Zoe discover a meteor crash in a nearby forest, and some strange tablets and a card that are used to summon a Triceratops who later named Chomp to come out. Dr. Z plots to become Dinosaur King and a dinosaur battle ensues between Chomp and Terry the Tyrannosaurus (that belongs to Ursula). Soon Chomp is worn out and tired, and it seems obvious that Terry will win the battle until Max uses a move called Electric Charge.
2	"Battle at the Pyramids (part 2 of 2)"; Transliteration: "The Companions have Increased! Ace and Parapara" (Japanese: 仲間が増えたぞ!エースとパラパラ)	February 11, 2007	September 15, 2007	TBA
A Spinosaurus card has been discovered in Egypt and Max and Ursula, Zander and Ed race to get to it and eventually claim it. Meanwhile, Rex and Zoe get their dinosaur partners, a Carnotaurus and a Parasaurolophus, named Ace and Paris. A great battle is fought and Chomp is weakened, but is healed by Paris's Nature's Blessing move card. Although Ursula gets Spinosaurus, both Terry and Spiny are defeated by Chomp and Ace.
3	"Tanks a LOT!"; Transliteration: "Saichania Struggle" (Japanese: サイカニア争奪戦!)	February 18, 2007	September 22, 2007	TBA
The D-Team and Ursula, Zander and Ed head to London to claim the Saichania running loose in a museum. Rex and Ace are soon separated from the D-Team and ends up running into Ursula and Terry. Ace uses Cyclone on Terry, but then Terry uses his move and defeats Ace. Meanwhile, Zoe and Paris are in a battle with Zander and Spiny and Spiny uses Shock Wave, nearly beating Paris. Paris calls for help and Max and Chomp come and defeat Spiny. While all this was happening, Terry defeats Ace with Volcano burst, but Dr. Taylor manages to claim his card and attempts to lure the Saichania with hippo feed.
4	"Bungle in the Jungle"; Transliteration: "Gabu has Disappeared in the Jungle!" (Japanese: ジャングルに消えたガブ)	February 25, 2007	September 29, 2007	TBA
While chasing a Saltasaurus in the Amazon rainforest, Max and Chomp are separated from the D-Team. Unfortunately, Ursula, Zander and Ed are back to get the dinosaur ... with a hungry Spiny. As the Saltasaurus wanders about the jungle, the Alpha Gang runs into it and releases poor, hungry Spiny!
5	"Rubble Trouble"; Transliteration: "Great Battle! Great Wall of China" (Japanese: 大決戦!万里の長城)	March 4, 2007	October 6, 2007	TBA
A Carcharodontosaurus has been sighted in China, and it causes fires near the Great Wall of China! Rex gets mad at Max after Chomp and Ace accidentally breaks a fossilized ammonite. Max, Rex, and Zoe transport to China, and get into a heated discussion with Ursula, Zander and Ed. When the Carcharodontosaurus gets in a fight with Terry, he uses Fire Cannon at Terry and it hits the Great Wall, getting Zoe buried under the leftover rubble in the process. When Max and Rex keep arguing on how to stop the Alpha Gang and save her, Zoe tells them they have to work together to accomplish that.
6	"Don't Mess With Maiasaura"; Transliteration: "Mother is Stronger! Maiasaura" (Japanese: 母は強し!マイアサウラ)	March 11, 2007	October 13, 2007	TBA
Max's mom is gone for the weekend and Zoe is in charge, but the guys don't like it. Even Chomp and Ace get in a fight with Paris. While Zoe is in the kitchen, the guys tie up Paris and leave. A Maiasaura with a "Diving Press" move card has been discovered in Switzerland ... and it has laid an egg. The D-Team and Ursula, Zander and Ed try to get the egg, but the D-Team went there to save the egg while the Alpha Gang are so hungry, they just want to eat it and Ursula summons Terry. The D-Team get a call from the mother herself, telling them to send her and her just-hatched baby back where they came from. Zoe says that women are strong when protecting their young. Apparently she's right because now the males have no choice but to do what she says.
7	"A Game Show Showdown"; Transliteration: "Utahraptor in the TV Station!" (Japanese: テレビ局にユタラプトル!)	March 18, 2007	October 20, 2007	TBA
The D-Team and Ursula, Zander and Ed try to win a game show in a TV station in Tokyo. A Utahraptor with the move Atomic Bomb is activated on one of the TV studio sets. Ursula summons Tank to capture it and uses it against the D-Team, but fortunately, Max and Rex capture it, but the Alpha Gang win the grand prize money.
8	"Maui Owie!"; Transliteration: "Surfing Dinosaur, Beach Battle!" (Japanese: 波乗り恐竜、ビーチバトル!)	March 25, 2007	October 27, 2007	TBA
A Styracosaurus has appeared in Hawaii, the D-Team and Ursula, Zander and Ed try to get the Styracosaurus. In the beginning, the Styracosaurus and Chomp seemed to know each other, since Styracosaurus and Triceratops are both ceratopsians. But, Ursula summons Spiny and Terry and Zander and Ed activate Tail Smash and Neck Crusher. The Alpha Gang win however, a move card called Lightning Spear that came with the Styracosaurus was claimed by the D-Team.
9	"Dino Snore!"; Transliteration: "Ankylosaurus in a Sleepless Town" (Japanese: 眠れぬ街のアンキロサウルス)	April 1, 2007	November 3, 2007	TBA
During an overnight construction Rex and Ace can't sleep. Meanwhile, Max and Chomp sleep perfectly. The two get in a fight. Max calling Rex uptight, and Rex calling Max clueless. Then an Ankylosaurus appears in a subway train station in Japan, with the same problem Rex and Ace had last night. The D-Team and Ursula, Zander and Ed try to capture it, but Rex and Ace got separated from the D-Team. Ed summons Tank to capture it but when Zander activated Dino Swing, Ankylosaurus used Mole Attack to defeat Tank. Ace (after getting attacked by its Mole Attack move) won the battle against the Ankylosaurus, and the D-Team captured it. Max and Rex make up and becoming best friends once more.
10	"Downtown Runaround"; Transliteration: "Lots of Dinosaur Cards!" (Japanese: 恐竜カードがいっぱい!)	April 8, 2007	November 10, 2007	TBA
The D-Team and Ursula, Zander and Ed race across Japan to get a book filled with dinosaur cards. The Alpha Gang gets the book, but Zoe gets a move card called "Metal Wing" which summons 3Pteranodons that defeat Terry.
11	"Alpha Bets It All"; Transliteration: "Monaco Dinosaur Grand Prix" (Japanese: モナコ恐竜グランプリ)	April 15, 2007	November 17, 2007	TBA
In Monaco, a Suchomimus appeared and ate all the fish while Ursula, Zander and Ed are hanging out on the beaches of Monaco. The D-Team arrives to capture the Suchomimus, but before they can, the fishermen suspect the D-Team having something to do with the dinosaur and imprison them. After a communication from Dr. Taylor is heard on Max's Dinoholder, the fisherman release them. Ace competes against Zander's Spiny to see who will catch it. After Spiny is defeated the Suchomimus suddenly attacks Ace who at this time was worn out.
12	"Alpha's Zeta Point (part 1 of 2)"; Transliteration: "Let's Go! Dinosaur Island" (Japanese: 行くぞ!恐竜島)	April 22, 2007	24 November 2007	TBA
After Chomp breaks his data disk, Dr. Spike Taylor sentences Max to D-Lab janitorial duty for three days. At Zeta Point, Helga's vacuum ends up bringing the Ceratosaurus to life causing Max to take a break from cleaning the D-Lab restroom to get the dinosaur. The D-Team tries to capture it unknown to them that Zeta Point is where the Alpha Gang's headquarters are. The Alpha Gang ends up capturing them and Ursula, Dr. Z and Rod summon Terry, Spiny, Tank and Styracosaurus to capture Chomp, Ace and Paris.
13	"Escape from Zeta Point (part 2 of 2)"; Transliteration: "Great Escape! Actyl Base" (Japanese: 大脱出!アクト基地)	April 29, 2007	November 24, 2007	TBA
After the D-Team captured, Max and his friends tried to escape. After evading the Alpha Gang members and evading Alpha Droids (especially the ones assisting Seth), the D-Team has their encounter with Helga. After making it outside the base, Ursula, Zander and Ed summon Terry, Spiny and Tank to fight. Dr. Taylor soon came to the rescue. The D-Team get their dinosaurs back, get the Ceratosaurus, and escape with Styracosaurus and a deck of move cards in their possession. And there's another reason why Dr. Taylor came to their rescue: Who else would do D-Lab janitorial duty if anything bad happened to Max?
14	"Child's Play"; Transliteration: "Rome's Secret Dinosaur" (Japanese: ローマのシークレット恐竜)	May 6, 2007	December 1, 2007	TBA
An unusual Pachycephalosaurus with rainbow luster has been activated in Rome with the move "Laser Ray". Dr. Z recognizes it as a dinosaur he raised, and decides to reclaim it (with the company of Ursula, Zander and Ed). But this Pachycephalosaurus not only has devastating power but speed. The D-Team summon Chomp, Ace and Paris and Ursula and Dr. Z summon Spiny and Terry.
15	"Volcanic Panic"; Transliteration: "Relaxing! Dinosaur Hot Springs" (Japanese: ぶらり!恐竜温泉)	May 13, 2007	December 8, 2007	TBA
When the D-Team are enjoying the first part of their summer vacation at a hot spring in Devon Island, in the Canadian Arctic Archipelago, an Acrocanthosaurus has been activated. It tries to reach a volcano in the ocean, where its family once thrived there and were killed, which made it lose complete composure. When the D-Team arrive, they see Ursula, Zander and Ed and Zander summons Terry.
16	"All Fired Up!"; Transliteration: "Burn Up! Acrocanthosaurus" (Japanese: 炎上!アクロカントサウルス)	May 20, 2007	December 15, 2007	TBA
Alpha Gang get the Acrocanthosaurus card and boosts it with a "Super Controller" which can make dinosaur under control and boost its power to the maximum. After operation, Acrocanthosaurus becomes fiery with a pyromanic persona. Worst of all, it's out of control and wants to incinerate everything in sight...
17	"Field Of Screams"; Transliteration: "Dinosaur Soccer, Ole!" (Japanese: 恐竜サッカーオーレ!)	May 27, 2007	February 9, 2008	TBA
An Altirhinus has been activated in Rio de Janeiro, Brazil where the Ole Festival's Soccer Cup is occurring, the Alpha Gang compete to get the Altirhinus. Rex summons Ace to fight the dinosaur but Ursula interrupts by summoning Spiny. Fortunately, Ace uses Cyclone to defeat Spiny, but the Altirhinus retreats. Later, Zander summons Tank but the plan failed. Later, Max summons Chomp to fight but, the Alpha Gang use their cheating methods in a game of dinosaur soccer and win the Altirhinus when Ed summons Terry.
18	"Dance Evolution"; Transliteration: "BaliBali Island's Dinosaur Dance!" (Japanese: バリバリ島の恐竜ダンス!)	June 3, 2007	February 16, 2008	TBA
A Daspletosaurus with the move card "Fire Bomb" has been activated in Bali, Indonesia, and starts dancing to music when Ursula, Zander and Ed arrive at the hotel it's at. As Max, Zoe and Rex head out to get the Daspletosaurus. Ursula summons Tank and Max summons Chomp. Despite being defeated by Tank, Daspletosaurus is claimed by Max and Rex.
19	"The Big Apple Grapple"; Transliteration: "Big Chase! New York" (Japanese: 大追跡!ニューヨーク)	June 10, 2007	February 23, 2008	TBA
The Alpha Gang infiltrate the Museum of Natural History to obtain the Amber Dinomond. D-Team find out about this and rush to the rescue. They summon Ace and Paris to battle to save the museum from Ursula, Zander and Ed who unleash Terry, Spiny and Tank. But an activation of the new "Bigfoot Assault" move card summons aSeismosaurus which helps fend off the Alpha Gang. The Alpha Gang get away with the artifact, but Dr. Z discovers that he needs more artifacts to lift Zeta Point into the skies.
20	"Tee'd Off"; Transliteration: "Battle of the Gigantic Dinosaur Golf Course" (Japanese: 巨大恐竜ゴルフ場の対決)	June 24, 2007	March 1, 2008	TBA
The D-Team finds a new Supersaurus move card called "Super Impact" listed on an online trading site, but the seller is only accepting golf goods in exchange. Fortunately, Max's father is a golf enthusiast and so caught up in the ongoing championships that he probably won't miss a driver or two. It seems there may be more than a chance connection, however, between the dinosaur card and the golf championships, when a larger-than-life Altirhinus shows up on the 18th hole.
21	"No Free Lunch"; Transliteration: "Friendly Dinosaur of the Limestone Cave" (Japanese: 鍾乳洞の友だち恐竜)	July 8, 2007	March 9, 2008	TBA
A Euoplocephalus has been activated in a cave in Japan with the "Quake Saber" move card. It befriends Zoe's new friend, Amy, when they go on a field trip. But Ursula, Zander and Ed arrive and Ursula summons Spiny to defeat her. Paris defeats Spiny. Zoe tells Amy to let the Euoplocephalus go. Amy agrees and takes a lizard home.
22	"Just Plane Crazy"; Transliteration: "Airport Chaos!" (Japanese: 空港大混戦!)	July 15, 2007	March 15, 2008	TBA
When Dr. Reese takes the D-Team to an airport, Zoe encounters an air traffic controller named Stanley who is an old friend of Reese's. The Alpha Gang's latest transport crashes nearby, resulting in the activation of the Megaraptor's card and damages the runway. With Rex and Dr. Reese stuck in the skies, only Max and Zoe are left to stop Ursula, Zander and Ed who summon Terry and Spiny. When Reese's plane was falling, Rex remembered a memory of his past and finish with a panic of skies. Paris defeats Spiny and Terry with Big Foot Assault, then Max manages to claim the Megaraptor, and Zoe uses Metal Wing to help Reese's plane land and save Rex and Reese.
23	"A Loch Ness Mess"; Transliteration: "The Ghost Dinosaur Nessie Appears!?" (Japanese: 幽霊恐竜ネッシー出現!?)	July 22, 2007	March 22, 2008	TBA
An Amargasaurus has been activated in Loch Ness, Scotland, around the time a sighting of the Loch Ness Monster occurs. Chomp and Paris managed to save it in the end from Zander and Spiny, but Ursula, Zander and Ed got away with the prize money. However, they encounter the Real Loch Ness Monster and freak out.
24	"Fashion Victims"; Transliteration: "Dinosaur Fashion of Paris" (Japanese: パリの恐竜ファッション)	July 29, 2007	March 29, 2008	TBA
Ursula lies to Dr. Z that a dinosaur was activated in Paris, France so that she can buy new clothes. After Dr.Z finds out and calls her, an Anchiceratops activates during a thunderstorm with the "Death Grind" move card. At the same time, dinosaur fashion is big in Paris, Max, Zoe, Rex arrive. Their dinosaurs run away, but Max drops his Dino Holder and can't call Chomp back. The Anchiceratops arrives at the dinosaur fashion, goes on rampaging but Chomp comes and escapes with him.
25	"A Miner Disaster"; Transliteration: "Save Futabasaurus!" (Japanese: フタバサウルスを救え!)	August 5, 2007	April 5, 2008	TBA
Ursula, Zander and Ed arrive at some Japanese mine and successfully find a Futabasaurus move card called "Futaba Super Cannon" as well as some Alpha Metal. When the whole D-Team encounter them, Ursula activates Spiny and Futabasaurus and Ed activates Tank to fend them off. However, Tank ends up turning against it, leaving its neck injured. It is later found on the shore of a lake by Zoe and Paris. During the next battle, the Alpha Gang steal it and use it on the D-Team again. Only when Zoe activates Nature's Blessing upon Chomp, the Futabasaurus remembers what happened before and turns against the Alpha Gang and ends up in the D-Team's possession.
26	"Double or Nothing"; Transliteration: "Catch the Dinosaur Thieves!" (Japanese: 恐竜強盗団を捕まえろ!)	August 12, 2007	April 15, 2008	TBA
4 people that resemble Dr. Z, Ursula, Zander, and Ed who end up escaping without the stolen money. This causes Dr. Z, Ursula, Zander, and Ed to seek them out. This causes them to get together to pull off a heist at a Las Vegas casino. When the cover is blown and the police are unable to fight, the D-Team appears and they fight them. Dr. Z, Ursula and Zander summon Terry, Tank and Spiny but they get defeated, the criminals are arrested, but the Alpha Gang escapes down a sewer.
27	"Carnival of Chaos"; Transliteration: "Big Profits from a Dinosaur Amusement Park!" (Japanese: 恐竜遊園地で大もうけ!)	August 19, 2007	September 13, 2008	October 3, 2008
The D-Team heads out to a dinosaur-themed amusement park, which brings back Spike's memories on how he met Aki. Meanwhile, the Alpha Gang are nearby using mind-controlled dinosaurs and an old amusement park to help them raise money (including food to feed their dinosaurs) which ends up going horribly wrong. The D-Team had to remove the mind control devices as the Alpha Droids gather the cards. Meanwhile, Max, Rex and Zoe summon Chomp, Ace and Paris to stop and calm down the remaining dinosaurs, but Rod and Laura summon Terry and Spiny. Ursula, Zander and Ed soon take over and end up defeated. NOTE: During the second airing of this episode on 4Kids TV, this episode was dedicated in memory of Madeleine Blaustein.
28	"Daddy Dearest"; Transliteration: "The Second Secret Dinosaur" (Japanese: 第二のシークレット恐竜)	August 26, 2007	September 20, 2008	October 3, 2008
After having a dream about the Secret Dinosaur, A Therizinosaurus, Dr. Z predicts where it will activate and sends Ursula, Zander, and Ed to Japan to capture it. As the D-Team searches for the perfect fossil for their school project, the same Therizinosaurus appears. Ursula, Zander and Ed summon Terry, Spiny and Tank but get defeated all at once. After that, Dr. Z and Seth arrive to claim it. However, Dr. Z's attempt to get the Therizinosaurus begins to fail as soon as it starts. Max and Rex claim it and after the battle, the D-Team finds the perfect fossil - a Therizinosaurus fossil.
29	"Rhino or Dino?"; Transliteration: "Savannah Dinosaur Poachers!" (Japanese: サバンナの恐竜密猟団!)	September 2, 2007	September 27, 2008	October 4, 2008
A rhinoceros charging toward the poacher Ungaro's tent plays a key in activating the Torosaurus card in Kenya. When Ursula, Zander and Ed arrive, they ally themselves with Ungaro and his henchmen in their poaching plot. When the D-Team arrives, they run into the local rangers when a transmission from Dr. Spike Taylor happens to reveal that he knows their leader Mary. After that, the D-Team helps them into stopping Ungaro After Spiny attacks Mary and the D-Team, a rhino crushes Max's Dinoholder.
30	"Dinosaur Amour!"; Transliteration: "The Big Dinosaur Proposal Plan!" (Japanese: 恐竜プロポーズ大作戦!)	September 9, 2007	October 4, 2008	October 5, 2008
Zander has washed up in Mexico after being separated in Kenya, and has found a Dinosaur Egg Capsule container where one out of two Saurolophus cards is activated. After Reese loses her glasses and her cell phone during her fossil expedition with Dr. Owen, the D-Team is unable to tell her about the appearance of the dinosaurs since Max's dad broke the transporter. Zander is rescued by Reece and Dr. Owen. Ursula and Ed arrive in Mexico to look for the dinosaur and Zander. After the transporter is fixed, the D-Team arrive after the Saurolophus chases Zander and Reese. Ursula summons Terry to fight it, Suddenly the second Saurolophus card hits a cactus and activates. With Terry defeated, Ed brings out Spiny and Tank to take out the two Saurolophus. Once Chomp is defeated, Ace and Paris join the battle to repel them. With Spiny and Tank defeated, the Alpha Gang retreats without the Saurolophus cards since Zander didn't want to have them separated again.
31	"Temple Tempest"; Transliteration: "Pawpawsaurus, the Substitute Dinosaur" (Japanese: 身代わり恐竜パウパウサウルス)	September 16, 2007	October 11, 2008	October 6. 2008
Dr. Z sends Ursula, Zander and Ed to Peru to look for the Temple of the Moon and find Alpha Metal. With Terry's help, they gain entrance into it. This causes the D-Team to head to Peru and learn that the Alpha Gang is in the Temple of the Moon. The Alpha Gang finds the Pawpawsaurus move card. When it came to the D-Team offering the Doll of Serenity to the Moon Spirit, the Alpha Gang and Terry attack.
32	"Falls Alarm!"; Transliteration: "Niagara Battle!" (Japanese: ナイアガラの対決!)	September 23, 2007	October 18, 2008	October 7, 2008
Ace must face his fear of water when a Baryonyx is activated at Niagara Falls. After they are transported there, Zoe, Max, and both of their dinosaur partners get on a boat toward the falls. Meanwhile, Ursula, Zander and Ed are back again and Ursula challenges Rex and Ace to a dinosaur battle with Terry. Ace is soon knocked into the water, driving him panicked and making it easier for Terry to fight him. Rex tells Ace to stop running from Terry and told him to face his fear. Terry uses Volancic Burst, but Ace dodges it. The attack hits a bridge making the Alpha Gang and Rex go flying. Then, Zoe saves Rex but Zander summons Spiny, who can swim well.
33	"Battle Royale!"; Transliteration: "Dinosaur Butterfly Stroke in the Ganges River" (Japanese: ガンジス河で恐竜バタフライ)	September 30, 2007	October 25, 2008	October 8, 2008
An Indian princess named Meena wants to follow the legend to swim toward the sunset in the Ganges River. Her attempt to escape from her palace plays a part in the activation of a Deltadromeus. The D-Team arrives in India and Zoe volunteers to take her place and learns what Meena goes through in her life. When Meena is at the Ganges River, she is joined by Deltadromeus, who swims alongside her until Ursula, Zander and Ed attack by using Spiny.
34	"Ninja Nightmare!"; Transliteration: "Ninja Dinosaur, Deinonychus" (Japanese: 忍者恐竜ディノニクス)	October 7, 2007	November 1, 2008	October 9, 2008
At a ninja village, Max and Chomp barely beat Zoe and Rex at a contest that involves the participants working with their pet partners. At a Dino Trooper Ninja show, a card containing three Deinonychus activates and its activation is found out by Dr. Z who heads there with Ursula, Zander, and Ed. Following a pursuing in the underground maze, Dr. Z confronts his Deinonychus trio, Dino, Dano & Sue, who aren't pleased to see Dr. Z. Zander summons Terry to protect Dr. Z.
35	"Ruff and Ready"; Transliteration: "The Iguanodon of Ayers Rock" (Japanese: エアーズロックのイグアノドン)	October 14, 2007	November 8, 2008	October 10, 2008
Ursula, Zander and Ed are sent by rocket shot to Australia, where they will collect a dinosaur. In the crash however, the Alpha Scanner broke and Spiny and Terry can not be used. But the Iguanodon is looking for peace and brings the three to a village. There, they make friends with the natives. When Seth comes to fetch them, the D-Team arrive, who also want to find the dinosaur. When Zander manages to fix Ursula's Alpha Scanner, he summons Terry to fight the Iguanodon.
36	"Metal Imbalance"; Transliteration: "Take the Actyl Metal!" (Japanese: アクトメダルを奪え!)	October 21, 2007	November 15, 2008	October 11, 2008
Seth experiments on the Velociraptor move card that he found in Australia give it a triangular shape upon combining its multiple moves. Max, Rex, and Zoe go to a field trip to an iron mill. However, Dr. Z sends Ursula, Zander, and Ed to take over the iron mill to purify Alpha Metal. Max manages to steal the Alpha Metal from them as Ursula sends the Alpha Droids after them. After being contacted by Ed, Dr. Z is persuaded by Seth to let him go to the iron mill. Upon Max's teacher Michele stumbling upon the Alpha Gang (and getting into another fight with Ursula who sends out Terry), Max unleashes Chomp to fight Terry. As Chomp leads Terry to an open space, Seth arrives and then uses the triangular card to finish Chomp. As Max throws the Alpha Metal in the hot lava (and gets Chomp's card), there is a loud explosion which is the end of the iron mill.
37	"Dueling Dinos"; Transliteration: "Dinosaur decisive battle in waste!" (Japanese: 恐竜!荒野の決闘)	October 28, 2007	November 22, 2008	October 12, 2008
With Dr. Z recuperating from a bad back, Seth loans the Velociraptor move card to Laura and Rod. Ursula, Zander and Ed lose Terry and Tank because Laura and Rod take two of the Alpha Scanners. Two farmers in Oklahoma play a key in activating a Saurophaganax card. Upon arrival, Laura and Rod tempt Max to do a Bronco match upon the horse Firecracker, which goes awry when it goes out of control. Ursula, Zander, and Ed also arrive and spot the Saurophaganax chasing cows. Zander unleashes Spiny to fight it. Spiny is defeated by the Saurophaganax's Magma Blaster. The stampede then enters the town as Max is finally thrown off Firecracker. Laura and Rod go after the Saurophaganax as Chomp catches up to it and does a Bronco move. Ursula, Zander and Ed encounter the herd again as Laura and Rod reaches the area. Upon the tempting of Laura and Rod, Max and Chomp face off in a showdown against the Saurophaganax. Eventually, Laura and Rod obtain it by unleashing Terry and Tank and give the card to Seth.
38	"Mythical Mix Up"; Transliteration: "Helga, the Dinosaur Goddess!?" (Japanese: 恐竜女神!タルボーンヌ)	November 4, 2007	November 29, 2008	October 13, 2008
In Cambodia's Angkor Wat Temple, a Stegosaurus card got activated out of the wall carving. D-Team tried to get the dinosaur but Rod, Lura, and Helga (who the Cambodians thinks she's a goddess) take it.
39	"Beast or Famine"; Transliteration: "Dinosaur Hotel" (Japanese: 恐竜大飯店)	November 11, 2007	December 6, 2008	October 14, 2008
In a rare moment of peace, the D-Team head to Chinatown to check out a celebrated touring chef Johnny Cook. But sure enough, before they have even had a chance to order, their plans are cut short by a Mapusaurus card activating during his cooking, so the D-Team summons their dinosaurs. If that weren't bad enough for Max, Laura and Rod have had Max's precious crab-and-egg fried rice! Laura and Rod summon Spiny and Tank to fight them.
40	"A Mesozoic Mess"; Transliteration: "Love and Corrida with Barcelona" (Japanese: 愛と闘牛のバルセロナ)	18 November 2007	December 13, 2008	October 15, 2008
With Helga missing, Zeta Point is a mess, forcing Ursula, Zander, and Ed to clean the place and take care of Dr. Z. Max's mother Aki is at a trip to Barcelona when Max learns that an Allosaurus has appeared there. The D-Team heads to Spain to catch the dinosaur and save Max's mother. They arrive just in time to find Max's mother cornered by the Allosaurus in a butcher shop. Max rescues his mother, but finds it difficult to corner the speedy dinosaur in the twisting streets of the city. Rod and Laura try to lure it, but the Ursula, Zander and Ed accidentally foil their plans by summoning Spiny, thinking that Rod and Laura were in danger. The D-Team lure it into an arena, deciding to attempt to capture it matador style.
41	"Lights, Camera, Destruction!"; Transliteration: "Dinosaur star of HollyWood" (Japanese: ハリウッドのスター恐竜)	November 25, 2007	February 21, 2009	October 16, 2008
Dr. Owen tells the D-Team that he's an adviser to a dinosaur movie called Prehistoric Park, directed by Stanley Spinoberg. However, he and Stanley had an argument on how the dinosaurs should be designed. The roof of the set breaks, allowing lightning from a thunderstorm activate a Pentaceratops. Helga's body is found by Stanley's crew. As the D-Team heads there, Helga is reactivated. When the dinosaurs get separated from the D-Team and end up on Prehistoric Park, Laura and Rod get the jump start. The Pentaceratops is running amok on the movie sets until it follows an animatronic Triceratops. The D-Team rendezvous with Dr. Owen as the Pentaceratops appears on the space set where Helga is, and she attacks the Pentaceratops. Rod unleashes Terry when it attacks Helga, only for the Pentaceratops to follow the animatronic Triceratops as it moves around the set. The case is on throughout the sets until it corners it on a CG site.
42	"Planes, Trains and Dinosaurs"; Transliteration: "Siberian dinosaur flier" (Japanese: シベリア恐竜特急)	December 2, 2007	February 28, 2009	October 17, 2008
An Ampelosaurus has been activated in Moscow, Russia. At Zeta Point, Ursula, Zander and Ed were about to go with Terry, Spiny and Tank to capture it, but Helga for some reason decided to keep them behind. As the D-Team heads to Moscow, Laura and Rod head out there to take over the Alpha Gang's place for the 6th time. The D-Team goes after the Ampelosaurus. Recognizing the train conductor at the Trans-Siberian Express, Seth decides to head there. The D-Team corner it at the Trans-Siberian Express. When they follow it into a boxcar, the D-Team end up on a train ride. When the Ampelosaurus is woken up, Paris sings it to sleep. Laura and Rod's attempt to capture the dinosaur by sending out Terry and Spiny fails, and the train goes out of control when the conductor faints at the sight of Seth and Tank. But the D-team don't know that at the first. Max somehow stops the train by riding on Chomp's back, then jumping on the engine and using the jog-sticks. Rod and Laura arrive and summon Terry, but Ampelosaurus uses Water Vortex on Terry which makes him go in his card form. Suddenly Seth and Tank came. Tank used Dino Swing move and finished Ampelosaurus.
43	"Vaccination Vacation"; Transliteration: "Malm's home disappeared!" (Japanese: 消えたマルムの家)	December 9, 2007	March 7, 2009	October 25, 2008
Chomp and Ace have come down with a cold and are afraid of getting a shot from Dr. Drake. The same thing happens to Terry, Spiny, and Tank at Zeta Point. Dr. Z sends Ursula, Zander, and Ed to obtain a dinosaur doctor so they won't have to put up with Helga's cure. Seth decides to help them out by testing a teleporter which brings the Drake household to Zeta Point. Unfortunately, Zoe is in the house as well! Then Ursula summons Tank.
44	"A Kyoto Caper"; Transliteration: "Fukuisaurus roams in Kyoto!" (Japanese: フクイサウルス京都を走る!)	December 16, 2007	March 14, 2009	October 26, 2008
The D-Team accompany Dr. Spike Taylor to Kyoto to deliver a complete Fukuisaurus fossil to Dr. Owen. A Fukuisaurus card activates and starts stealing shiny objects. Now that Dr. Z's back is feeling better, he decides to accompany Ursula, Zander, Ed, Laura, and Rod to obtain the Fukuisaurus. Zander summons Spiny to fight it but gets into a battle with Rex and Ace. Meanwhile, Ed summons Tank but Fukuisaurus defeats her and later Spiny. Laura and Rod appear and summon Terry, who defeats Fukuisaurus. Max and Chomp defeat him and eventually obtains the card.
45	"Santa Saurus!"; Transliteration: "Christmas of Megalosaurus!" (Japanese: クリスマスにメガロサウルス!)	December 23, 2007	August 22, 2009	October 27, 2008
It's Christmas time. Dr. Z sends Laura and Rod to the D-Team's town to steal the dinosaur cards that they have. To pull it off, they attempt to distract Aki from heading home only to be invited by her much to the dismay of Max. Back at Zeta Point, Dr. Z stumbles upon his forgotten Megalosaurus card. When the Alpha Droid scout spots Laura and Rod with the D-Team celebrating Christmas, Dr. Z lends Ursula, Zander, and Ed his Megalosaurus card and sends them to do the job that Laura and Rod couldn't accomplish. When Laura and Rod manage to steal the Zoe's Dinoholder, the D-Team go after them and end up in a dinosaur battle between Chomp and Ace and Terry and Tank. After Terry and Tank got defeated, Ursula, Zander and Ed arrive and summon Megalosaurus by accident. In the end, the D-Team defeat and obtain Megalosaurus making Laura, Rod and the Alpha Gang go back with nothing.
46	"Full Scheme Ahead"; Transliteration: "Dino Island head above water!" (Japanese: 恐竜島浮上!)	January 6, 2008	March 21, 2009	October 28, 2008
Reese has rebuilt the android (who introduces himself as Jonathan) who has another head to him. Though his memories have been missing after it was extracted by Seth, Jonathan seems to notice Rex's connection with Dr. Ancient. On Zeta Point, Seth tests out a new Move Card on Terry. When he notices Laura watching the tests, he informs her to keep the Move Card a surprise and not to tell anyone not even Terry's owner, Ursula, in case she gets angry. When Terry ends up sick, Rod tells Laura to take Terry to Dr. Drake's house. There, Laura finally admits what had happened to the D-Team as Jonathan makes off with their ride. At Zeta Point, when Jonathan demands for Seth, Ursula unleashes Spiny to attack, but Jonathan takes down Spiny as the D-Team and Rod arrive. Rod reveals that Seth has been working behind Dr. Z's back, forcing Seth to reveal his work by defeating his opponents.
47	"Tricks of the Traitor"; Transliteration: "Activated Giant!" (Japanese: 大恐竜出現!)	January 13, 2008	March 28, 2009	October 29, 2008
As Zeta Point sheds its island disguise, Dr. Z prepares his payback with Ursula, Zander, and Ed as Seth is experimenting on the full Tyrannosaurus fossil, only to go down - literally. Back at the D-Lab, Jonathan reveals the truth about Rex and his relationship with the Alpha Gang. Meanwhile, Seth finished a Super Dinosaur called the Black Tyrannosaurus rex as Dr. Z and the Alpha Gang catch up to him, summoning Tank and Ampelosaurus while Seth summons Saurophaganax. Seth uses Fire Scorcher, which defeats Tank and Ampelosaurus. Helga comes to their rescue and sends them to escape as she tries to buy them some time. Zeta Point shows up on the D-Lab's radar as Dr. Z's ship arrives at the D-Lab. Laura reveals to Dr. Z what he and Seth did to Dr. Ancient and Dr. Cretacia as a dinosaur signal goes off; Seth has unleashed his Black T-Rex.
48	"One Final Move"; Transliteration: "Black Tyrannosaurus' assault!" (Japanese: ブラックティラノ襲来!)	January 20, 2008	September 19, 2009	October 30, 2008
Seth has unleashed his black Tyrannosaurus rex upon the city. The D-Team tries to stop them, but Chomp, Ace, Paris are no match for the looming dinosaur. Dr. Z summons Terry but the plan fails. Seth holds Zoe hostage to get the D-Team to surrender their Dino Holders, which will power the Backlander. To reclaim them, the D-Team, Jonathan, and the Alpha Gang infiltrate the Backlander, which fails when Dr. Z sneezes in his Alpha Droid disguise. Jonathan manages to rescue them after rebuilding Helga. When they reach the control room, Spike uses his whip to reclaim the Dino Holders, causing Seth to summon Saurophaganax upon them. With some advice from Dr. Z, Max and Rex combine their Move Cards, allowing Chomp and Ace to defeat and recapture Saurophaganax. However, Seth still has one more trick up his sleeve - his unstoppable Black T-Rex!
49	"Dinosaur War!"; Transliteration: "Good bye...Our dinosaurs." (Japanese: さよなら...オレたちの恐竜)	January 27, 2008	September 26, 2009	October 31, 2008
Rod reveals that there is another way to get to the Control Room without going through the Black Tyrannosaurus rex. When the Black T-Rex's Fire Scorcher knocks Max down a hole, Jonathan manages to save Max and reveal that they are near the Central Control Room where the Time Machine is. Max and Jonathan decide to enter it while the others deal with Black Tyrannosaurus. Zoe comes up with an idea to use all the Fusion Moves upon luring the Black T-Rex to the Loading Dock. Jonathan, Max and Chomp take on the Alpha Droids. Helga activates the elevator controls to lift the Black Tyrannosaurus and the others to the outside. When outside, all the dinosaurs collected are brought out. Max gives Jonathan the Secret Dinosaurs to help Rex and Zoe. Max and Chomp enter the Control Room and are caught in Seth's trap as he activates the Time Machine. Jonathan saves Rex from the Black T-Rex's Fire Scorcher as he gives the card to them. It's an all-out battle between Zoe, Rex, Dr. Z (later Dr. Taylor), Laura and Rod against the Black Tyrannosaurus rex and Max against Seth.

=== Season 2 ===
No.	English dub title (top) Japanese title (bottom)	Japan (Original airdate)	USA airdate	UK airdate
50	"Alien Parent Trap (Time Napped)"; Transliteration: "The new adventures." (Japanese: 新たな恐竜アドベンチャー)	February 3, 2008	October 3, 2009	February 28, 2009
Rex and the reformed Alpha Gang have returned to the present when the threat of the Spectral Space Pirates is known. When Max's house disappears, Spike and the others are attacked by Gavro of the Spectral Space Pirates and his Torvosaurus. When the others travel through time to look for them, Max and Dr. Z get into a Dino Battle in the Cretaceous Period, when the meteor was about to hit the Earth. Afterwards, the D-Team and the Alpha Gang soon follow a Pterosaur, which Max recognizes as the same voice that had told them to help save the dinosaurs.
51	"Ancient Roman Holiday"; Transliteration: "Ancient Rome and armored dinosaurs." (Japanese: 古代ローマの武装恐竜)	February 10, 2008	October 10, 2009	February 28, 2009
The D-Team and the Alpha Gang have followed the Pterosaur to Ancient Rome. After an argument with Dr. Z, the D-Team encounter a girl named Sophia, who is being targeted by Gavro when it is discovered that she has the Yellow Cosmos Stone. Max transforms Chomp into his dinosaur form to fight Gavro's Torvosaurus. Gavro equips his Torvosaurus with Spectral Armor and uses Magma Blaster. Although Chomp counters with Thunder Bazooka, which successfully hits, the armor that is called Spectral Armor defends Torvosaurus, and deflects the attack. Ace is summoned to back up Chomp as Gavro chases Sophia, with Zoe on their heels. To stop Gavro from getting to Sophia, Zoe uses Metal Wing to chase him away. Meanwhile, Chomp and Ace use Thunder Storm Bazooka once again and defeat Torvosaurus, but Gavro manages to escape.
52	"Desperately Seeking Spartacus"; Transliteration: "The second cosmos freebooter." (Japanese: 第二の宇宙海賊...だったりして)	February 17, 2008	October 17, 2009	March 1, 2009
Dr. Z reveals that the armor the Torvosaurus was wearing was the result of a stone that was on its head. Sophia reveals to the D-Team that her brother is Spartacus and that he was taken away by the Roman Army sent to her hometown of Trachia by Lucius Cornelius Sulla. The D-Team has a run-in with Foolscap of the Space Pirates who arrives to claim the Yellow Cosmos Stone after Gavro's failure. Foolscap unleashes a Shunosaurus upon them, followed by equipping it with the armor in its battle with Chomp. The Alpha Gang and Terry run afoul with the Roman military. Foolscap attacks Max and Rex again until realizing that the Yellow Cosmos Stone isn't with them. When Shunosaurus ends up occupied with the Roman Military, Majungasaurus was used to help obtain the Yellow Cosmos Stone from Sophia. The D-Team arrives and sends Chomp, Ace, and Paris into battle while Foolscap activates the armors for both his dinosaurs. With the new Move Cards taken from Dr. Z, the D-Team defeat the Majungasaurus and Shunosaurus, but Foolscap escapes.
53	"Coliseum Clash"; Transliteration: "The Swordsman Spartacus" (Japanese: 剣闘士スパルタカス)	February 24, 2008	October 24, 2009	March 1, 2009
After escaping the angry villagers (who mistook them for sorcerers and planned to turn them over to the Roman Army), Max and co end up looking for Spartacus and hope to free him before the gladiator fights begin. Meanwhile, the Spectral Space Pirates' leader, Spectre, speaks to Gavro, Foolscap, and Sheer about the current plight about the D-Team and the Alpha Gang's interference. Terry ends up unleashed into the Colosseum even after he damaged the cells enough for Spartacus and the other gladiators to escape. Rex and Zoe end up calling Ursula an old lady enough for her, Zander, and Ed to get free. When Lucius Cornelius Sulla threatens to kill Sophia (or at least have her take Spartacus' place in the Colosseum) if Spartacus doesn't surrender, the D-Team rescue her with the soldiers in hot pursuit.
54	"There's No Place Like Rome"; Transliteration: "Dinotecter, ON!" (Japanese: ディノテクト オン!)	March 2, 2008	October 31, 2009	March 5, 2009
Despite being cornered by the guards, the D-Team are attacked by Sheer and her Yangchuanosaurus who succeed in capturing Sophia and frightening the guards away. Max sends out Chomp to battle the Yangchuanosaurus as Sheer activates its armour. When Rex sends out Ace to help, Sheer withdraws it at the last minute. She then threatens Sophia to give up the Yellow Cosmos Stone. Ursula, Zander, and Ed end up recaptured and they use Spiny in their Colosseum fight against Spartacus, where it is discovered that Sophia gave him the Yellow Cosmos Stone, which he uses to power up his sword. He easily trumps Spiny until Sheer summons Yangchuanosaurus. Spartacus proves to be no match for the Yangchuanosaurus when Sheer activates its armour. Only when the D-Team arrived did they save Spartacus. Sheer activities Venom Fang card (featuring a Piatnitzkysaurus) to encounter Chomp, but he defeats it when Rex and Zoe summon Ace and Paris. When Ace and Paris are defeated, Dr. Z arrives and Max uses his new DinoTector to armor up Chomp and defeat the Yangchuanosaurus by using Chomp's new move, Ultimate Thunder. But Sheer successfully claimed the Yellow Cosmos Stone.
55	"Dinosaurs of the Caribbean"; Transliteration: "Dinosaur of the Caribbean Sea" (Japanese: カリブ海の恐竜)	March 9, 2008	November 7, 2009	March 6, 2009
The D-Team and the Alpha Gang followed the Pterosaur to the year 1718 at the Caribbean. The D-Team ends up running afoul of Blackbeard's pirates and the British Military. They encounter Jimmy (who soon falls in love with Zoe) and his father who are being pursued by both parties. He flees with the D-Team when his father is captured by pirates. They are soon attacked by the pirates as well as Gavro's Edmontonia and Diceratops who fight Rex and Ace (with DinoTector on). In the nick of time, Dr. Z and the Alpha Gang arrive to summon Terry (Also with DinoTector on). By using Terry's Ultimate Fire, the Edmontonia is defeated, but Gavro and Blackbeard escape with the Diceratops and one half of the map.
56	"X-Treme Map Quest"; Transliteration: "Who is the Whitebeard...?" (Japanese: 海賊白ヒゲ...って誰?)	March 16, 2008	November 14, 2009	March 8, 2009
After the D-Team narrowly escaped the boulder left behind from the last battle, Max and Jimmy are at odds with each other. Dr. Z and the Alpha Gang arrive posing as pirates with Dr. Z as Whitebeard. The D-Team and the Alpha Gang soon end up attacked by the British Military. After evading them, the D-Team arrive on the island where Gavro and Blackbeard's pirates are. Upon stumbling upon them, the D-Team end up in a battle with them as Zoe unleashes Paris upon them. Gavro activates Diceratops and activates its armor. Zoe also activates Paris's armor. Despite Diceratops's defeat (thanks to Paris's new Ultimate Leaf), Gavro makes off with Jimmy after she smacks the boy in the face and sends him flying.
57	"High Sea Chase"; Transliteration: "Storm battle of the sea monsters" (Japanese: 嵐の海竜戦)	March 23, 2008	November 21, 2009	March 8, 2009
The D-Team and the Alpha Gang pursue Blackbeard's pirates and Gavro after they captured Jimmy. After a visit from Blackbeard's parrot, the D-Team is forced to make a trade for the other half of the map in exchange for the boy's safety. Soon after, the D-Team and the Alpha Gang pursue them again. When a storm hits, both parties struggle to survive. Foolscap activates a Jobaria to pull Blackbeard's ship through the storm as Max activates Chomp to use Lightning Strike to eliminate the storm. Ursula uses Spiny (with DinoTector on) to fight the Jobaria as Foolscap uses Ocean Panic to summon 5 Ophthalmosaurus, only to be countered by Futaba Mega Cannon. After a stalemate ensues, using the Pteranodons, Max recovers the map as Spiny defeats the Jobaria and the Ophthalmosaurus with Ultimate Water.
58	"Amazing Treasure Race!"; Transliteration: "Find out the dino treasure island!" (Japanese: 発見!恐竜宝島)	March 29, 2008	November 28, 2009	March 11, 2009
With the British Military attacking, Dr. Z activates the pirate ship's submarine mode to evade them. Upon arriving on the next island, the D-Team are then ambushed by Sheer and the Megaraptor the D-Team captured. During battle, Chomp and the Megaraptor fall into the sea. As Blackbeard finds a water-filled cave and sails into it, Sheer recalls the Megaraptor. A booby trap leaves the island half-submerged as Jimmy recovers the real map from Blackbeard. After finding the real location of the treasure, the D-Team are attacked by Sheer who activates Her Megaraptor. The D-Team unleashes Chomp, Ace, and Paris to fight it. Ace defeats the Megaraptor and its Ninja Attack with Ultimate Wind, but Sheer captures the Blue Cosmos Stone. Blackbeard and his crew are arrested by the British Military and Jimmy is reunited with his father and before going in the timeship, Jimmy gives Zoe a kiss.
59	"Four Part Harmony"; Transliteration: "Dino Journey to the West" (Japanese: 恐竜西遊記)	April 6, 2008	December 5, 2009	March 12, 2009
After a near-disaster with the time ship and following the bird-shaped figure again, the D-Team and the Alpha Gang arrive in Ancient China where Foolscap has summoned Shantungosaurus to help with his search for the Purple Cosmos Stone. When Foolscap kidnaps the Buddhist monk Shwan-dzang, he runs afoul of the D-Team. Zoe uses Metal Wing and summons the Pteranodons to rescue Shwan-dzang as Zapper armors up his Shantungosaurus and brings out a Tupuxuara which helps to defeat Paris. Max armors up Chomp and defeats the Shantungosaurus and Tupuxuara, but Foolscap escapes.
60	"Elements of Surprise"; Transliteration: "Shwan-dzang VS Mapusaurus" (Japanese: 三蔵vsマプサウルス)	April 13, 2008	December 12, 2009	March 13, 2009
After recovering the Shwan-dzang's necklace, the D-Team set off to find the third Cosmos Stone. Meanwhile, Sheer is also searching for a Cosmos Stone and ends up causing a local village to think monsters from a nearby volcano are attacking after she sicks her Mapusaurus on some woodcutters who disturbed her sleep. On a volcano, Shwan-dzang is captured by Sheer and her Mapusaurus just as the D-Team catch up to them. Ace manages to rescue him as Chomp fights the Mapusaurus. Max and Sheer activate their dinosaur's armors at the same time. Heat Eruption (the move card Sheer uses on her Mapusaurus) accidentally sets off a volcano eruption causing her to recall her Mapusaurus and the D-Team fall back to the village. When Sheer tries to abduct Shwan-dzang again, Zoe unleashes Paris and Paris uses her bellowing sounds causing Sheer drop Shwan-dzang. Chomp defeats and rescues Mapusaurus and the D-Team combine their dinosaurs' attacks (Lightning Strike, Emerald Garden and Biting Wind) to stop the eruption.
61	"Monk in the Middle"; Transliteration: "Ryuta transforms into Sun Wukong" (Japanese: リュウタ、孫悟空になる)	April 20, 2008	December 19, 2009	March 15, 2009
While traveling thought the desert, Shwan-dzang mentions Max's connection to Sun Wukong. At a nearby village, Dr. Z is posing as a priest with Ursula, Zander, and Ed as his followers when Gavro attacks by attempting to capture him and he activates his Achelousaurus. Ursula unleashes Spiny upon it, who doesn't do a good job on the Achelousaurus (in the Dinosaur King gameplay, Lightning is stronger than Water). Gavro recalls the Achelousaurus as he gets away with Dr. Z. After learning that Dr. Z isn't Shwan-dzang, he goes after the real one and unleashes Achelousaurus to fight the D-Team followed by armoring up the Achelousaurus. Chomp defeats the Achelousaurus, Gavro retreats with its card, but Shwan-dzang has already left the area.
62	"The Third Cosmos Stone"; Transliteration: "Digs here, Saichania!" (Japanese: ここ掘れ!サイカニア)	April 27, 2008	February 6, 2010	April 23, 2009
The D-Team scales a mountain to catch up with Shwan-dzang only for Gavro to get to him first. Gavro takes Shwan-dzang to where he had taken Dr. Z for it is said to hide a Cosmos Stone in it. It's not long before Foolscap and Sheer arrive to help break up Shwan-dzang and Gavro's argument to make him move the large rock. In the nick of time, the D-Team catches up. Meanwhile, Ursula, Zander, and Ed are scaling the same mountain and Ed unleashes Tank to dig into the mountain. When Tank comes near the Cosmos Stone, it moves the rock blocking the cave entrance. The Space Pirates encounter Tank, so Gavro activates the Carcharodontosaurus the D-Team captured, to attack her. Sheer unleashes a Lanzhousaurus to attack Chomp with Power Drain. With Chomp drained of energy and Tank still attacking, Gavro and Sheer armor up their dinosaurs. Max and Rex armor up their dinosaurs as well. Upon the Alpha Gang catching up, Ed armors up Tank. Chomp, Ace, and Tank (who uses her new Ultimate Earth) defeat their dinosaur opponents, but Foolscap has made off with the Purple Cosmos Stone. When Shwan-dzang returned to the village, no one is responding to the D-Team's transmission back at the time ship.
63	"Two Shoguns Are Better Than One"; Transliteration: "Escape in Sengoku period!" (Japanese: 戦国時代で大脱走!)	May 4, 2008	February 13, 2010	April 5, 2009
Dr. Taylor and the other parents are prisoners on Space Pirates' hip. Dr. Ancient and Dr. Cretacia encounter Seth on the side of Space Pirates when they are put to work. After Jonathan arrives, the D-Team and the Alpha Gang follow the Pterosaur to Japan's Warring States period, where Sheer and some kunoichi's attack Ieyasu Tokugawa's escort group. Sheer unleashes a Gojirasaurus, which sets off the D-Team's Dino Holders. The D-Team encounters Ieyasu after he fell off a cliff during Sheer's attack. Sheer and her Gojirasaurus catch up and attacks. Max summons Chomp to fight the Gojirasaurus. Meanwhile, Zoe's father falls from the Space Pirates' ship while treating one of the dinosaurs and his mistaken as Ieyasu Tokugawa by Ieyasu's escort. When Rex summons Ace, Sheer armors up the Gojirasaurus, making it too fast for Chomp and Ace. Max and Rex armor up their dinosaurs and Gojirasaurus uses Defense Burst against Chomp, but Ace defeats the Gojirasaurus with Hurricane Beat, which knocks Sheer unconscious. The kunoichi find her and take her back to their headquarters.
64	"The No-Fun Shogun"; Transliteration: "Mihasa, just like a ninja woman" (Japanese: ミハサ、くのいちになる)	May 11, 2008	February 13, 2010	April 11, 2009
Ieyasu Tokugawa tells the D-Team the legend of Yamata no Orochi and how Susanoo had defeated him. Sheer awakens with the kunoichi, and decides to help them. Foolscap is sent to look for Mihasa and abducts Ieyasu in the process only to be attacked by the kunoichi. Foolscap attacks them with the Megalosaurus only for Sheer to arrive and counter with the Deinonychus Trio. The D-Team arrives at the scene of the fight with Megalosaurus being defeated by the Deinonychus Trio's Cross Cutter attack. When kunoichis start to attack Ieyasu, Max and Rex summon Chomp and Ace. Rex armors up Ace and defeats the Deinonychus Trio with Sonic Blast. After reclaiming the card, Sheer and the kunoichis escape.
65	"Dinosaurs, Ninjas and Bears! Oh My!"; Transliteration: "My Dad is Ieyasu Tokugawa!?" (Japanese: パパが家康!?)	May 18, 2008	February 20, 2010	April 12, 2009
Going through a cave beneath the waterfall, the D-Team and Ieyasu Tokugawa travel through it while the Alpha Gang are attacked by a bear as the Battle of Sekigahara is about to begin. They run into the D-Team and attack by Terry results in Zoe, Ieyasu, and a bear cub being trapped under a pile of rocks. Max and Rex use Chomp and Ace to help get them out and force the Alpha Gang to help out. During this, Ace gets attracted by the White Cosmos Stone. With Zoe, Ieyasu, and the bear cub out and Rex appears with the Cosmos Stone, Gavro attacks and unleashes his Baryonyx against Ace, who ends up trapped in the Baryonyx's Aqua Whip. Chomp and Paris join the battle and free Ace. With that, both sides use their respective armor. Ieyasu and the White Cosmos Stone get away with some assistance from Hanzou while Chomp defeats the Baryonyx. Gavro goes after Ieyasu while the D-Team has a run-in with a larger bear.
66	"There's No Business Like Shogun Business"; Transliteration: "Dinosaur battle of the division war" (Japanese: 天下分け目の恐竜合戦!)	May 25, 2008	February 20, 2010	April 18, 2009
With the Alpha Gang occupied by bears, Zoe feels a bit down at the moment from missing her parents. Gavro is still looking for Ieyasu and Hanzou, but the D-Team manages to catch up with them. Upon getting closer to the battle, the D-Team and Ieyasu are attacked by Sheer and her kunoichi allies. Max and Rex transform Chomp and Ace to help defend Ieyasu followed by Chomp and Ace armoring up. Sheer summons her Deinonychus Trio to attack Chomp, Ace, and Hanzou. Gavro and Foolscap see her fighting, and fly down to help. Zoe transforms Paris and armors her up to fend off some kunoichis. Foolscap and Gavro activate a Tuojiangosaurus and the Pentaceratops the D-Team captured, to attack the D-Team and then armors them up. As Ieyasu and the D-Team run right into the battle, Chomp and Ace turn their attentions toward the Pentaceratops and the Tuojiangosaurus. When soldiers fire arrows toward Gavro and Foolscap, Tuojiangosaurus uses Quake Saber on them while Paris knocks away Gavro. Zoe uses Green Impulse to help defeat the Tuojiangosaurus, sending Foolscap flying. Chomp defeats the Pentaceratops and the Deinonychus Trio are defeated, but Sheer takes off with the White Cosmos Stone and Zoe's father.
67	"The 39 Thieves"; Transliteration: "Wonderlamp Genie is a dinosaur?!" (Japanese: ランプの精は大恐竜!?)	June 1, 2008	February 27, 2010	April 19, 2009
The D-Team and the Alpha Gang end up in Ancient Persia, where they find Gavro using his Afrovenator to get into a secret cave. After Gavro leaves, Max was able to guess the right password to get in. When in the cave, the D-Team encounter an Arabian girl named Princess Zara (who was recently captured by the Forty Thieves) and an activated Isisaurus who she referred to as a Genie, since its card activated in a lamp she found when water hit it. As the D-Team are led to where the Red Cosmos Stone is, Dr. Z and the Alpha Gang are also in the cave. The Alpha Gang try to claim some of the treasure when Gavro returns and unleashes the Afrovenator. Ursula uses Spiny, but Spiny's defeat causes the cave to slowly cave in as Gavro and Afrovenator confront the D-Team. Rex summons Ace to fight the Afrovenator. Ace defeats the Afrovenator as the cave-in occurs; the Alpha Gang are taken prisoners by the Forty Thieves, and the D-Team, Isisaurus, and Zara get caught in a sandstorm once they leave.
68	"Desert Heat"; Transliteration: "Dino Arabian nights" (Japanese: 恐竜アラビアンナイト)	June 8, 2008	February 27, 2010	May 30, 2009
After a fierce sandstorm, the D-Team, Zara, and Genie the Isisaurus run into the Forty Thieves, where Dr. Z and the Alpha Gang were forced into attacking the D-Team, but retreat after a failed attempt to capture Zara. As thanks for saving her life, Zara gives Max a kiss on the lips. After they leave, Foolscap sees the D-Team from afar. Meanwhile, the parents attempt to make an escape and end up unleashing every dinosaur from their prisons on the Gel Jarks. Max and Rex end up in an argument when Zara ends up flirting with Max. Later that night, the D-Team watch the stars, which their freed parents also do before getting recaptured by the Gel Jarks. With Dr. Z's life being threatened by the Forty Thieves leader Zayid, Ursula, Zander, and Ed are forced into helping in a coup d'état orchestrated by the sultan's prime minister. The next morning, Foolscap and the Gel Jarks attack the D-Team. Max transforms Chomp as Zapper activates a Pachyrhinosaurus. Ace also joins the battle just as Zapper armors up the Pachyrhinosaurus. Ace is defeated when Foolscap activates an Anhanguera Dive, but Paris joins the battle. As Chomp gets free from the Gel Jarks, Max and Zoe armor up Chomp and Paris followed by the activation of Green Impulse for Tupuxuara to fight the Anhanguera. With the Pachyrhinosaurus and Anhanguera defeated, Foolscap retreats, but Max gets stuck in quicksand.
69	"Princess of the City"; Transliteration: "Aladdin and the Magic Dinosaur" (Japanese: アラジンと魔法の恐竜)	June 15, 2008	March 6, 2010	May 31, 2009
Genie the Isisaurus rescues Max from a sinkhole when journeying to Zara's city. Upon discovering its takeover, the D-Team discover that there is a bounty on Zara even when they confront Zayid. After a daring escape, the D-Team run into the Alpha Gang who mentioned that they were forced to help them as it is mentioned that the sultan and Dr. Z are locked up. Meanwhile, the Red Cosmos Stone drops out of the mouth of the Isisaurus (and ends up back in its mouth) which causes Jark to detect it and send Sheer to that area. At the same time, the D-Team and Zara end up encountering Aladdin, a man with a genie act in which the "genie" leads them into a trap. Just then, Sheer attacks and unleashes a Lexovisaurus. Max transforms Chomp to fight the Lexovisaurus while Rex transforms Ace to keep Sheer from making off with Zahrah. Zoe activates Paris to repel Zayid as Sheer armors up Lexovisaurus and defeats Chomp. Rex armors up Ace to save Zara, Zoe, and Paris from Lexovisaurus's Sand Trap attack. Ace defeats the Lexovisaurus, but Sheer's not done yet.
70	"Malice in the Palace"; Transliteration: "The Arabian Battle of 10 Dinosaurs!" (Japanese: 10大恐竜アラビアンバトル!)	June 22, 2008	March 6, 2010	June 1, 2009
Sheer's attempt to take Zahrah is thwarted by Aladdin who stops Sheer. The D-Team and Zahrah managed to escape. In the Spectre's jet, Sheer has a conversation with Seth about the Cosmos Stone being detected nearby. The D-Team and Zara return to the Isisaurus's area. The Alpha Gang managed to make a risky attempt to reclaim the Alpha Holders which works. The D-Team and Zahrah return to the city on back of the Isisaurus, Genie. Ursula, Zander, and Ed are once again forced to attack the D-Team who activate Chomp, Ace, and Paris against Terry, Spiny, and Tank. During the ensuing fight, Sheer arrives and takes control of the Isisaurus and then armors it up. The Alpha Gang armors up their dinosaurs to attack the Isisaurus. Dr. Z and the sultan get free with help from Aladdin. With the Alpha Gang's dinosaurs defeated, Max and Rex armor up their dinosaurs and combine their attacks to defeat and rescue the Isisaurus as the Red Cosmos Stone drops into the hole that the Alpha Gang is in. Helga arrives to bring Dr. Z to the ship with the Red Cosmos Stone in position, but Sheer escapes and the bad guys are arrested.
71	"The French Conniption"; Transliteration: "I'm Louis XIII!" (Japanese: ボクちゃん、ルイ13世)	July 6, 2008	March 13, 2010	June 2, 2009
The D-Team follows the bird-like figure to France in the year 1615. Sheer also arrives and impresses Queen Marie de' Medici by helping to look for the Eye of Gaia (which is suspected by Sheer to be the next Cosmos Stone). With the aid of Cardinal Richelieu and the Queen's guards, Sheer unleashes a Rajasaurus upon the school. The D-Team arrives and Max unleashes and armors up Chomp to fight the Rajasaurus. Sheer also armors up the Rajasaurus. Despite Chomp defeating Rajasaurus, the building they fought near is demolished as Mihasa and Cardinal Richelieu get away. Lady Constance breaks up a fight between Max and d'Artagnan so that she can get to Princess Anne.
72	"The Wee Musketeers"; Transliteration: "Organize the Teen Musketeers Group!" (Japanese: 結成!少年銃士隊!)	July 13, 2008	March 13, 2010	June 3, 2009
d'Artagnan and his fellow orphans catch up to Lady Constance and the D-Team to help them find Princess Anne. Spectre gets word from Seth that the creation of Gigas (an altered Tyrannosaurus) is complete. Gavro joins up with Cardinal Richelieu as they storm Duke Dumas' Chateau (where Louis XIII and Princess Anne were visiting at the time) to look for the sixth Cosmos Stone. The Alpha Gang also arrives at the chateau and unleash Spiny. Gavro unleashes the Anchiceratops the D-Team captured. The D-Team arrives and Max unleashes Chomp to help Spiny. Gavro unleashes Gigas which defeats Spiny. When Rex and Zoe transform Ace and Paris, Gavro armors up the Anchiceratops. The D-Team armors up their dinosaurs and Chomp defeats and gets back the Anchiceratops. When it turned out the orb in the chateau isn't the sixth Cosmos Stone, Gavro withdraws Gigas and retreats.
73	"All For One"; Transliteration: "Ursarapa's secret past" (Japanese: ウサラパ 秘められた過去)	July 20, 2008	March 20, 2010	June 4, 2009
The D-Team help to officially establish a Musketeers team and set off toward Vasasi Castle where the Eye of Gaia is said to be located. The Alpha Gang run afoul of Cardinal Richelieu's guards and unleash Tank upon them. Foolscap arrives and unleashes the D-team's Ankylosaurus to attack Tank. After the Ankylosaurus defeats Tank, Foolscap withdraws it and continues looking for the sixth Cosmos Stone. Cardinal Richelieu's guards run into the D-Team and Teen Musketeers only for Lady Constance and Princess Anne to end up requesting an audience with Cardinal Richelieu. At the house where Cardinal Richelieu is, the Alpha Gang infiltrates it and end up unleashing Terry to attack the guards. When Cardinal Richelieu takes the Teen Musketeers prisoners, the D-Team and the Alpha Gang go after them and eventually catch up. Foolscap arrives and unleashes the Ankylosaurus followed by Foolscap armoring up Ankylosaurus when Ace is unleashed. Rex also armors up Ace. Foolscap unleashes Armatus (an altered Stegosaurus created by Seth) to attack Ace, but Max and Zoe transform and armor up Chomp and Paris. The Alpha Gang managed to get the Teen Musketeers to safety. Foolscap withdraws both his dinosaurs as the D-Team cross the bridge.
74	"The Haunted Hunt"; Transliteration: "Battle in the Ghost Castle" (Japanese: 幽霊城の戦い)	July 27, 2008	March 20, 2010	July 1, 2009
When the soldiers cut the ropes on the bridge, the D-Team starts to fall until Ursula and Zander activate the Anhanguera and Tupuxuara to rescue them. The D-Team, the Alpha Gang, and the young Musketeers arrive outside of the haunted Vasasi Castle. They follow Paris to where the sixth Cosmos Stone might be. When Gavro and Sheer arrive, the Alpha Gang unleash Terry, Spiny, and Tank. Gavro brings out Gigas. As Ursula withdraws Terry, Zander and Ed armor up Spiny and Tank. When Tank is defeated, Chomp and Ace join the battle and armor up to help Spiny. Sheer catches up to Zoe and unleashes Maximus (an altered Triceratops created by Seth) as Zoe unleashes Paris and armors her up. Ursula joins the battle and armors up Terry, but he got defeated pretty soon. When Paris gets the Green Cosmos Stone in her mouth, she attacks Maximus with her Ultimate Move and defeats him, followed by Sheer catching her card and retreating to Gavro. Then Chomp, Ace and Spiny combine their attacks to defeat Gigas. Gavro grabs his card and retreats with Foolscap and Sheer. When Cardinal Richelieu has his soldiers surround the D-Team, Queen Marie de' Medici arrives to stop the Cardinal at the last minute. After Queen Marie de' Medici, the Cardinal, and the Musketeers leave, the D-Team claim the Green Cosmos Stone.
75	"Bad Deal"; Transliteration: "The betrayer in the Jurassic" (Japanese: ジュラ紀の裏切り者)	August 3, 2008	March 27, 2010	July 2, 2009
When Gavro, Foolscap and Sheer return and unleashes Gigas, Armatus, and Maximus, Jonathan rescues the D-Team in the nick of time. Spectre, Gavro, Foolscap, and Sheer directly negotiates with the D-Team. But after it fails, they attack them. The D-Team and the Alpha Gang manage to escape by going into the Jurassic time period. Meanwhile, Seth appears to the kids to appeal for help from the Space Pirates even quoting that Spectre forced him to create Gigas, Armatus, and Maximus. However, it was just a trick to steal the Cosmos Stones, which he successfully does. Gavro attacks and unleashes Gigas resulting in Max and Rex armoring up Chomp and Ace. Gavro then has Gigas set the nearby forest on fire with its Magma Blaster attack. Seth escapes onto the Space Pirates Timeship. Max and Rex withdraw their dinosaurs and are beamed up by Jonathan.
76	"The Forest Fire Effect"; Transliteration: "Changed in the future?!" (Japanese: 未来が変わっちゃった!?)	August 10, 2008	March 27, 2010	August 1, 2009
Reese contacts the D-Team and the Alpha Gang informing them that plants and giant insects are overtaking their time. When Jonathan takes the timeship back to the present, the D-Team and the Alpha Gang find it overrun with plants and giant insects. The D-Team and the Alpha Gang head down and are attacked by giant insects, but the Alpha Gang extracts the giant insects. Meanwhile D-Team their way to the D-Lab, they find Reese, Laura, Rod, Dr. Owen, and Patrick tied up by the living vines, because they were attacked by plants. Zoe and Rex getting grabbed, but Max and Chomp evade the vines, they go into the basement and attack them at their root. With Laura and Rod with them, the D-Team and the Alpha Gang return to the Jurassic to undo the damages that the Space Pirates caused in the Jurassic. Heading toward the Stone Age where the last Cosmos Stone is, the D-Team confront Gavro, Foolscap and sheer alongside Gigas, Armatus, and Maximus and armor up their dinosaurs. Just then, Spectre arrives and transforms his Apatosaurus named Brontikens (named after its related species, the Brontosaurus) into its full dinosaur form.
77	"The Search for the Last Cosmos Stone"; Transliteration: "Contend for the Black Cosmos Stone" (Japanese: ブラックコスモストーン争奪戦)	August 17, 2008	April 3, 2010	August 2, 2009
Spectre and Brontikens have joined the battle. When Brontikens' Spectral Destroyer hits a volcano, its eruption causes the Space Pirates members to withdraw their dinosaurs. The D-Team also withdraw their dinosaurs and retreat onto the timeship. Dr. Z and the Alpha Gang are rescued by Helga as the Black Cosmos Stone falls into a Woolly Mammoth's mouth. When the D-Team learn about this, they head to the part in time where Dr. Spike Taylor and a younger Max uncovers this. After an earthquake drives the younger Max and Spike Taylor away, the D-Team and the Alpha Gang begin excavation when the Space Pirates arrives. When the D-Team and the Alpha Gang are beamed back aboard the timeship, Dr. Z revealed that he grabbed the Black Cosmos Stone and the mammoth fossil at the last minute. The Space Pirates end up giving the D-Team their parents only for them to turn out to be Gel Jarks in disguise which capture the D-Team. However, the Black Cosmos Stone turns out to be a fake as well and Seth communicates with the timeship to give up the Black Cosmos Stone. Seeing what Seth is up to, Spectre orders his minions to stop him. When Gavro unleashes Gigas, Seth unleashes a Cryolophosaurus. Foolscap and Sheer also unleash Armatus and Maximus. On the timeship, Helga discovers that the Gel Jarks can't stand salt when she punches two of them. Seth uses Blizzard Smash to freeze Gigas, Armatus, and Maximus. Seth then commandeers the timeship to escape and obtains the Black Cosmos Stone. Helga uses salt upon the Gel Jarks holding the D-Team and the Alpha Gang hostage freeing the D-Team and the Alpha Gang who fight back. Max and Chomp confront Seth and the Cryolophosaurus.
78	"Clash for the Cosmos Stones"; Transliteration: "The Black Pterosaur" (Japanese: 黒い翼竜)	August 24, 2008	April 3, 2010	August 3, 2009
As Max armors up Chomp, Seth's Cryolophosaurus proves to be too fast for Chomp. Seth manages to flee and runs into Rex, Zoe, Laura, and Rod while the Alpha Gang fends off the Gel Jark. Rex and Zoe unleash Ace and Paris and armor them up. Dr. Z gives Max the Final Thunder card which Max uses on Chomp to attack Cryolophosaurus. The Cryolophosaurus is defeated, but Seth retrieves its card and escapes with the Black Cosmos Stone and leaving behind a Gel Jark pod. After a failed attempt from the Space Pirates to get the remaining Cosmos Stones, the D-Team gets a transmission from Seth that he has cornered Reece and Dr. Owen. Upon returning to the present, the D-Team and the Alpha Gang have armored up their dinosaurs. Seth's Gel Jark has knocked out Jonathan and seized the remaining Cosmos Stones. As the Cryolophosaurus attacks, Seth takes the Cosmos Stones and heads into the D-Lab. The Space Pirates arrives and Gavro, Foolscap, and Sheer unleash Gigas, Armatus, and Maximus who defeat Chomp, Ace, Paris, Terry, Spiny, and Tank and wrecks the D-Lab. When Spectre uses his tractor beam to steal the Cosmos Stones, it brings them together and creates the Dark Pterosaur which envelops the Space Pirate's Timeship.
79	"Fate of the Cosmos"; Transliteration: "Say bye bye to our dinosaur friends." (Japanese: バイバイ恐竜 オレの友だち)	August 31, 2008	April 10, 2010	August 4, 2009
The Black Pterosaur starts attacking the city as Seth and Dr. Z are rescued from the rubble. The D-Team and Alpha Gang summon their dinosaurs and combine their attacks to break into the Dark Pterosaur. Inside, Spiny and Tank got defeated by Armatus and Maximus. When the good Pterosaur protects them, Chomp, Ace and Paris combine their attacks to defeat Maximus and Armatus, Gigas and Terry defeat each other after their attacks collided, and when Brontikens tried to attack them, Chomp Ace, and Paris combined their Ultimate Moves to defeat Brontikens. When the D-Team reunites with their parents on the Space Pirate's Timeship, Seth takes Jonathan's timeship with the help of the Pterosaur, he defeats the Dark Pterosaur. However, Seth becomes unconscious as a result of charging head-on into it. After the damages caused by the Dark Pterosaur are undone, The D-Team (except Rex), Dr. Owen, Dr. Taylor, Reese, Dr. Drake says goodbye to Rex, his "true" parents, the Alpha Gang as they go on to the future and The 2 D-Team members says Rex and the "A" gang to take care of their dinosaurs. As for the Space Pirates, they are floating about in time-space in Spectre's pod.

== DVD release ==
=== Region 1 (United States/Canada) ===
The version released on DVD and SDBD is the English dubbed version by 4Kids Entertainment. The DVDs were distributed through Shout Factory.

Volume	Volume name	Release date	Contents
1	The Adventure Begins...	September 23, 2008	Episodes 1 – 5
2	Downtown Showdown	February 3, 2009	Episodes 6 – 10
3	Volcanic Panic	June 30, 2009	Episodes 11 – 15

Announced on September 24, 2018, Discotek Media announced its license and its planning to release the series on two SDBD sets for each season.

Season	Release date	Contents
1	November 27, 2018	Episodes 1 – 49
2	November 27, 2018	Episodes 50 – 79
