= Sophia Crawford (novelist) =

Irish novelist and poet (1799–1878)

- Born: 1799; County Cork
- Died: 1878; Devon
- Occupation: Writer
- Spouse: Abraham Crawford
- Father: James Mockler

Sophia Crawford (1799 – 1878) was an Irish novelist and poet who published under the name Mrs. A. Crawford.

Sophia Mockler was born in 1799 in Rockville House, County Cork, Ireland, one of eleven surviving children of the Rev. James Mockler, vicar of Litter in the Diocese of Cloyne, and Sybella Baker Mockler. In 1831, she married Abraham Crawford, an Admiral of the Royal Navy who had been invalidated home in 1829. He published a memoir, Reminiscences of a Naval Officer, During the Late War, in 1851.

Crawford published two books of poetry and five novels. Her novels include The Double Marriage (1852), a sensation novel about bigamy, and two historical novels, Lismore (1853) and The Story of a Nun (1855).

Sophia Crawford died in 1878 in Devon.

== Bibliography ==
- Stanzas. London: T. C. Newby, 1830.
- Stanzas on Hearing Broadhurst Sing John Anderson. 1850
- The Lady of the Bedchamber: A Novel. 2 vol. London: T. C. Newby, 1850.
- The Double Marriage: A Novel. 3 vol. London: T. C. Newby, 1852.
- Lismore. 3 vol. London: T. C. Newby, 1853.
- The Story of a Nun: A Novel. 3 vol. London: T. C. Newby, 1855.
- Early Struggles. 3 vol. London: T. C. Newby, 1857.
