= Alfred R. Kahn =

American executive (born 1947)

- Born: Alfred Robert Kahn; January 18, 1947 (age 79); Brooklyn, New York, United States
- Education: LIU Post
- Occupations: Former CEO & Chairman of 4Kids Entertainment; Chairman of Kidtagious Entertainment
- Known for: Pokémon; Yu-Gi-Oh!

Alfred Robert Kahn (born January 18, 1947) is an American executive. From 1991 to 2011, he was chairman and CEO of 4Kids Entertainment, a global provider of children's entertainment and merchandise licensing. He previously led the licensing division for the Coleco company. In 1995, he turned Leisure Concepts, Inc. into 4Kids Entertainment, having previously been chairman and CEO of the company since March 1991. In 2002, he founded the National Law Enforcement and Firefighters Children's Foundation. In 2012, he co-founded CraneKahn LLC and was the CEO and co-owner of that company. In 2019, CraneKahn folded into Kidtagious Entertainment and became as a successor company of 4Kids Entertainment.

Kahn alsois on the board of directors of the Federal Drug Agents Foundation, Children's Tumor Foundation, Stephen Gaynor School for Learning Difficulties, Long Island University, and Bette Midler's New York Restoration Project. He has also appeared in various conferences surrounding the anime industry.

== Career ==
Born in Brooklyn to Murray and Lilyane Kaplan Kahn, Alfred R. Kahn graduated from C.W. Post College at Long Island University. Previously the head of the licensing division for Coleco, Kahn joined Leisure Concepts, Inc., turning that company into 4Kids Entertainment, for which he became vice chairman in July 1987 and later chairman and CEO in 1991. 4Kids eventually became the largest trading entity in North America in the 1990s due to its success of licensing Japanese anime series Pokémon and Yu-Gi-Oh! among many others, as well as producing American series like Teenage Mutant Ninja Turtles. Kahn has been the executive producer for numerous other 4Kids properties, including G.I. Joe Sigma 6 and Cubix.

In September 2002, Kahn founded the National Law Enforcement and Firefighters Children's Foundation to help the children of law enforcement personnel and firefighters and fund anti-drug and anti-violence programs. Kahn also is on the board of directors of the Federal Drug Agents Foundation, the Children's Tumor Foundation, the Stephen Gaynor School for Learning Difficulties, Long Island University, and Bette Midler's New York Restoration Project.

On June 22, 2005, LIMA, the International Licensing Industry Merchandisers' Association, inducted Kahn into the Murray Altchuler Licensing Hall of Fame for his "continual and outstanding" contributions to the licensing industry for over 10 years. Over those 10 years, Kahn and 4Kids had licensed such properties such as Pokémon, Yu-Gi-Oh!, Tokyo Mew Mew and Teenage Mutant Ninja Turtles.

Kahn also won the 2006 Spirit of Achievement award from the National Center for Learning Disabilities.

In December 2007, Kahn was a panelist in the ICv2 Conference on Anime and Manga in New York City. There, he commented about the Japanese manga industry that "manga (sic) is dying in Japan". This particular comment sparked some derisive comments from fans. Rich Johnson of Yen Press replied to the previous comment, stating that manga was still a billion dollar industry in a down phase.

Kahn retired as the CEO of 4Kids Entertainment on January 11, 2011. In 2018, Kahn joined Ecomi which focuses on digital licenses for Disney, Marvel and DC Comics, among others.

Kahn founded CraneKahn LLC with his wife Jillian Crane in early 2012, acting as the CEO of the company. CraneKahn is an intellectual property development and marketing company. They also act as consultants for a variety of companies helping to develop and monetize their brands. In 2019, CraneKahn changed its name to Kidtagious Entertainment and became as a successor company of 4Kids Entertainment.

== Criticism and controversy ==
Kahn incited controversy during a manga panel at the 2006 New York Comic Con when he bluntly stated "Kids today don't read, they read less today." This incited a negative reaction from many of those present in the room, mainly librarians and other representatives of the publishing industry. He later elaborated on his comment by saying that, "In every survey, we find that they're watching more television, they're on the Internet more, and that content, although being king, is very disposable. Because the way content gets put out now, it gets put out free. " Viz Media's Liza Coppola responded to Kahn's words by bringing up Viz's partnership with the Read for America literacy campaign, stating "Manga is a great medium to bring kids back to reading." Publishers Weekly went on to note in their online article that "(Kahn) noted that many people in the U.S. walk around with MP3 players or other electronic devices, whereas in Japan, everyone on the subway seems to have a '3,000-page manga'."

Kahn has caused a lot of controversy among fans of anime who believe that his "Americanization" and censorship of anime licensed by 4Kids tarnishes their original format. In a 2005 interview with Anime News Network, Kahn defended his company's actions by claiming that such actions are necessary to make the series appeal better to children. In response to such criticism, 4Kids Entertainment eventually released unedited versions of their licensed series Yu-Gi-Oh! and Shaman King in the fall of 2004, but the releases were terminated in spring 2005.

== See also ==
- Norman J. Grossfeld
