= 4Kids Entertainment =

Former American licensing company

4Kids Entertainment, Inc.
- Final logo as 4Kids Entertainment, used from 2005 to 2012
- Formerly: Leisure Concepts (1970–95); 4Kids Entertainment (1995–2012); 4Licensing Corporation (2012–17)
- Type: Public
- Traded as: NYSE: KDE; OTCBB: KIDE; OTCQB: FOUR
- Industry: Licensing
- Genre: Anime
- Founded: April 28, 1970; 56 years ago (as Leisure Concepts, Inc.)
- Founders: Mike Germakian; Stan Weston
- Defunct: February 7, 2017; 9 years ago
- Fate: Filed for Chapter 11 bankruptcy
- Successors: Konami Cross Media NY (Yu-Gi-Oh! license); Kidtagious Entertainment (select previous head); Saban Brands (majority of license assets and The CW4Kids/Toonzai); Hasbro Entertainment (Cubix: Robots for Everyone current license); The Pokémon Company International (Pokémon license); Nickelodeon Productions (TMNT and Winx Club); Discotek Media (Sonic X); Toei Animation (Magical DoReMi); Nintendo Stars, Inc. (Kirby: Right Back at Ya! license)
- Headquarters: New York City, New York, U.S.
- Area served: Worldwide
- Products: FoxBox/4Kids TV; The CW4Kids/Toonzai
- Number of employees: 16 (2013)
- Subsidiaries: 4Kids Entertainment International Limited; 4Kids Entertainment Licensing, Inc. 4Kids Entertainment Home Video, Inc. 4Kids Productions, Inc. 4Kids Ad Sales, Inc. The Summit Media Group, Inc. 4Kids Technology, Inc. Websites 4 Kids, Inc. 4Kids Entertainment Music, Inc.
- Website: https://www.4kidsentertainmentinc.com/

4Kids Entertainment, Inc. (formerly known as Leisure Concepts, Inc. and later known as 4Licensing Corporation; stylized as 4K!DS ENTERTAINMENT) was an American licensing company. The company was previously also a film and television production company that produced English-dubbed Japanese anime through its subsidiary 4Kids Productions between 1992 and 2012; it specialized in the acquisition, production and licensing of children's entertainment around the United States. The first anime that 4Kids Productions dubbed was the first eight seasons of Pokémon that originally began airing in first-run syndication, and then it later moved to exclusively air on Kids' WB! in the United States. The company is most well-known for its range of television licenses, which has included the multibillion-dollar Pokémon and Yu-Gi-Oh! Japanese anime franchises. They also ran two program blocks: Toonzai (originally The CW4Kids) on The CW, and 4Kids TV (originally FoxBox) on Fox, both aimed at children. The 4KidsTV block ended on December 27, 2008, while its Toonzai block ended on August 18, 2012, which was replaced by Saban's Vortexx, which in itself was succeeded by the One Magnificent Morning block by Litton Entertainment (now known as Hearst Media Production Group) in 2014.

4Licensing Corporation had its world headquarters on Third Avenue in New York City, its former subsidiary, 4Kids Productions, had its headquarters in a separate building in Manhattan. The New York Stock Exchange delisted 4Kids (NYSE: KDE) on June 1, 2010. On April 6, 2011, it filed for Chapter 11 bankruptcy protection following a lawsuit concerning the Yu-Gi-Oh! franchise. On December 13, 2012, the company announced that it had emerged from bankruptcy as 4Licensing Corporation. On September 21, 2016, it filed for Chapter 11 bankruptcy protection once again and shut down operations one year later. 4Kids' former CEO, Alfred R. Kahn, founded a successor company called Kidtagious Entertainment in 2019.

== History ==
=== Company origins ===
Leisure Concepts was co-founded on April 28, 1970, by Mike Germakian (later who would be known as one of the creators of ThunderCats) and Stan Weston (the creator of G.I. Joe and Captain Action), as an independent licensing agency in New York City. Mike Germakian was the secretary of LCI, while Stan Weston was initially the President and later the Chairman of Leisure Concepts. Weston was also the Treasurer of the company.

=== 1970–87: Early beginnings ===
In the beginning, the company pitched toy and cartoon ideas to various companies, as well as formed partnerships with companies such as Rankin/Bass, among others.

LCI began making news in the 1980s through licensing actual people, a variety of products, and even concepts. The company also had a growing number of deals with television producers and toy manufacturers. Among the company's licenses at the time were Farrah Fawcett of Charlie's Angels fame, Charlie Chan, James Bond 007, a wide array of Nintendo characters and products, the Hulk, Buck Rogers in the 25th Century TV Series and many others.

LCI is credited in its assistance in the initial development of the "ThunderCats" concept and acted on behalf of Lorimar-Telepictures Corp as an exclusive worldwide licensing agent for products based on "Thundercats", an agreement that was signed between the two parties on June 15, 1984.

During the mid-1980s, Ted Wolf came up with the idea of a race of catlike humanoid superheroes. He shared his vision with his friend Stan Weston, who in turn, through LCI, pitched it to Rankin/Bass Animated Entertainment. Both Arthur Rankin Jr and Jules Bass were impressed with the idea and the potential that it had of becoming an instant success. They approved of it and ThunderCats went into production.

During the early development stage, Mike Germakian designed much of the ThunderCats' characters, vehicles and locations. He was also responsible for creating the now iconic ThunderCats logo, featuring a stylized black panther head on a red circle. Germakian's designs were then sent to Pacific Animation Corporation in Japan to be adapted into cartoon format. After completing work on ThunderCats, Germakian went on to design characters for SilverHawks and The Comic Strip, both Rankin/Bass shows.

In July 1987, Alfred Kahn, former Executive Vice President of Marketing at Coleco, who was credited for bringing the Cabbage Patch Kids to the Mainstream, joined the company as vice chairman and a member of the board of directors.

On December 17, 1987, LCI signed a licensing deal with Nintendo of America, Inc. to market the software products that went along with its increasingly popular gaming systems. Nintendo had already introduced The Legend of Zelda for its Nintendo Entertainment System, a software product that went on to sell more than one million copies during the year. Some time in 1986, the company also signed a licensing deal to market Star Wars.

=== 1987–95: Expansion ===
In 1987, Bobby Kotick (former President and CEO of Activision Blizzard) tried to acquire Commodore International. When Kotick was unsuccessful, he instead purchased a controlling stake in LCI, thus also becoming LCI's CEO and chairman in June 1990. Kotick later traded out of his stake in LCI and bought a 25% stake in Activision in December 1990. In March 1991, Kotick became CEO at Activision.

The company did $6 million in sales in 1989 and employed 14 people by 1990.

On March 12, 1991, LCI appointed Alfred Kahn as its chairman and CEO.

In 1992, two subsidiaries were established by the company: The Summit Media Group, Inc. and 4Kids Productions. Summit was LCI's media buying and planning services division which would also handle Broadcast syndication for television shows. 4Kids Productions was the media division of the company which would produce and acquire television shows. This would include English-dubbing Japanese anime, which the company would be mostly known for.

In June 1993, LCI opened up an overseas office based in the United Kingdom.

In September 1995, 4Kids Productions' very first television series, WMAC Masters, premiered on syndicated television stations across the United States.

=== 1995–2000: 4Kids Entertainment ===
On November 16, 1995, Leisure Concepts Inc. changed its name to 4Kids Entertainment Inc. This allowed the company to expand on the licensing of children's properties. Leisure Concepts remained as a separate subsidiary of the company, as did The Summit Media Group and 4Kids Productions.

In January 1998, 4Kids Entertainment announced that it had acquired the rights to the Pokémon animated series outside of Asia. This news followed a major incident where an episode's special effects led to almost 700 people in Japan being taken to the hospital. When noted on the incident when 4Kids attended NATPE 1998 to pre-sell the series, Summit's Chief Executive Officer, Shelly Hirsch, confirmed that the flashing lights in episodes would be toned down. Pokémon debuted in the United States in September with fifty-two half-hour episodes, becoming the highest-rated syndicated children's program and beating other programmes like Today in its timeslot. By October, 4Kids and Lacey Entertainment had pre-sold the series in countries such as Italy, Australia, Mexico, Canada, and Brazil while Leisure Concepts signed merchandising deals with companies such as Tiger Electronics and American Greetings.

The popularity of Pokémon on broadcast syndication led to Kids' WB picking up the US broadcast rights to the series in January 1999. Alongside this, the show continued to be sold internationally. By October, 4Kids Entertainment employed 50 people.

=== 2000–05: The new millennium ===
With the continued success of Pokémon, the new century found 4Kids Entertainment the opportunity to produce and/or license more content, hoping to achieve similar successes. In February, the company announced the production of two original properties, entitled The Adventures of Flamehead (which would never come into fruition) and Cubix. They also secured the licensing rights outside Japan to Sony Creative Products' Tama & Friends, its second anime property. On April 5, 4Kids and Mattel signed a licensing agreement to create Hot Wheels die-cast cars and racing sets featuring the PACE Motor Sports line of monster trucks. The license included rights to the monster truck Grave Digger, and a new line of World Championship Wrestling vehicles designed after their star wrestlers such as Goldberg, Sting and Bret Hart. The PACE Motor Sports and World Championship Wrestling line of Hot Wheels vehicles have been available nationally at mass-market retailers beginning in the summer of that year. On September 20, 4Kids switched from the NASDAQ market and joined the New York Stock Exchange. The firm's new ticker symbol was KDE, and the company was riding high during the continuing success of Pokémon when it earned Fortune's top slot on its 100 Fastest Growing Companies for 2000. The company was also listed on the Frankfurt Exchange earlier in the year. 2000 also saw 4Kids launch two new divisions – Technology 4Kids, which would develop toys and new hi-tech experiences, and Websites 4Kids, which would produce online portals to shows produced and/or licensed by the company.

In January 2001, 4Kids acquired the rights to two additional shows – Ultraman Tiga and Kinnikuman. On April 19, 4Kids Entertainment announced it had acquired the merchandising and television rights to the series Yu-Gi-Oh! Duel Monsters outside of Asia from Nihon Ad Systems. After pre-selling US broadcast rights to Kids' WB, the series premiered in September 2001 to equal success on par with Pokémon. On October 10, 4Kids announced a new five-year agreement with their long-term partner Nintendo of America, where they would secure exclusive merchandising rights to Nintendo properties outside Japan as well as right of first refusal media rights to any Nintendo property. This deal replaced their previous long-term deal dating back to the 1980s. It would be separate from its existing Pokémon agreement through Pokémon USA, Inc., itself being renewed by 4Kids for the same period, of which they acquired a 3% stake in its parent The Pokémon Company in a move to benefit indirectly from Pokémon's success in Asia, and from worldwide sales of Pokémon electronic cards and video games. At the end of the year, 4Kids' international division, LCI UK, was renamed 4Kids Entertainment International. while Leisure Concepts, Inc. became 4Kids Entertainment Licensing, Inc.

In late January 2002, after engaging in a bidding war with DIC Entertainment, 4Kids Entertainment signed a four-year, US$100 million deal with the Fox Broadcasting Company to program its Saturday morning lineup. In May, 4Kids announced they had entered into a deal with Mirage Studios to produce a new Teenage Mutant Ninja Turtles television series to air on the new strand in the first quarter of 2003, as well as securing worldwide merchandising rights to the property. Later on in the month, 4Kids announced that its new Fox strand would be named the FoxBox and would premiere in September. Alongside this news, 4Kids announced they had secured the air rights to the Kirby anime series under their deal with Nintendo, as well as Food Feud (renamed Fighting Foodons upon premiere), both of which would air on the block. With 4Kids wholly responsible for the content on the FoxBox, they formed a new division – 4Kids Ad Sales, to hold all advertising revenues coming from it. In the same month, 4Kids Entertainment announced the formation of 4Kids Entertainment Home Video, Inc., and signed a North American distribution deal with FUNimation Productions. Releases under 4Kids Entertainment Home Video would include releases of Yu-Gi-Oh!, Cubix, Cabbage Patch Kids and Tama and Friends. The FoxBox strand officially premiered on Fox on September 14, 2002. By the end of the year, 4Kids got $140 million in Pokémon revenue.

On January 30, 2003, 4Kids secured an international licensing deal with German children's company TV-Loonland AG to be the exclusive licensing, television, and home video agent for its series The Cramp Twins in the United States. The expansion of the series in the country followed its immense success in the United Kingdom. Throughout 2003, 4Kids would go on to acquire additional properties including the US rights to Funky Cops, Sonic X and Shaman King, of which all three shows would be added to the FoxBox for the 2003-04 season. An additional pickup, the Italian animated series Winx Club, was secured for a February 2004 schedule with 4Kids holding all English-speaking rights to the series. 4Kids also acquired the rights to Magical DoReMi in October.

4Kids began 2004 by picking up the rights to Tokyo Mew Mew, which would be renamed as Mew Mew Power upon its premiere. In June, they announced they had picked up English-speaking rights to One Piece from Toei Animation. The series would premiere on the FoxBox during its 2004-05 season, with additional acquisitions including another Nintendo-based anime series, F-Zero: GP Legend, and a short-form series based on The Incredible Crash Dummies, which the company was the licensing agent for at the time.

=== 2005–10: Further expansion and financial failings ===
On January 18, 2005, 4Kids Entertainment announced a major rebranding, including a new, refreshed logo, and the introduction of the 4Kids TV brand, which would be used for its media portals and as the rebranding of the FoxBox strand. The FoxBox officially changed its name to 4Kids TV on January 22. In May, they secured a licensing agreement with Apex Marketing and Dracco Company Ltd. to produce an animated television series based on their card game Chaotic for a 2006 release cycle. On June 10, 4Kids licensed the sequel series to Yu-Gi-Oh!, Yu-Gi-Oh! GX, where the series would air on Cartoon Network in the United States in October.

With the diminishing popularity of Pokémon compared to the start of the decade, 4Kids began to disassociate itself from the property. They announced on October 10 that they had sold their 3% stake in The Pokémon Company for US$960,000, to the three parties owning the rights to Pokémon (Nintendo, Creatures and Game Freak). On December 23, 2005, they announced that they would not renew their representation agreement for the franchise that was that was set to expire on December 31, and that beginning in 2006, Pokémon USA, Inc. would take all licensing and dubbing operations in-house outside of Asia. However, the company would continue to receive commissions for the next several years, on payments made under existing Pokémon license agreements whose term expired after December 31, 2005.

For the start of 2006, 4Kids began to license and produce more shows outside of acquiring anime properties. In January, they signed an agreement with Microsoft Game Studios to co-produce a new child-friendly IP for the Xbox 360 in an attempt for the system on a broader market. 4Kids would be the exclusive licensing and distribution agent for the new property. In March, the companies revealed the project as Viva Piñata, which would consist of a video game developed by Rare and a computer-animated television series co-produced by 4Kids Entertainment and animated by Bardel Entertainment that would air on 4Kids TV. Both the game and the series would simultaneously release in the fall. On April 18, 4Kids launched a new subsidiary entitled 4Sight Licensing Solutions Inc., which licenses and markets brands aimed at adults, teenagers and pre-teens. "We have built an impressive roster of captivating and successful children's entertainment properties", said Alfred Kahn. "Given the increased number of brands that we are representing that focus on an older audience, we felt it would be beneficial to organize a new subsidiary primarily devoted to the marketing and licensing of these brands. We believe that we can successfully utilize our marketing and licensing expertise to build brand value for properties targeting an older consumer that are not necessarily media or character driven." On June 24, 4Kids announced that it would be closing The Summit Media Group as a cost-cutting measure and to continue its focus on producing and licensing original properties. On December 11, 4Kids announced the formation of two subsidiaries, TC Digital Games, LLC, a trading card company, and TC Websites, LLC, an online multi-platform game company. "The formation of TC Digital Games and TC Websites represent a significant enhancement of our business strategy", said Alfred R. Kahn, chairman and CEO of 4Kids Entertainment.

On August 28, 2007, 4Kids secured the rights to Dinosaur King, an anime series based on a card and arcade game originally produced by Sega. On October 2, Warner Bros. and CBS announced that the Kids' WB programming block on their co-owned network, The CW, would be ending in 2008, and no longer be marketed and produced in-house, due to factors including cable competition. Rights for the five-hour Saturday morning block were bought by 4Kids, and they began to program the time with their own programming (mixed in with three former Kids' WB originals) in September 2008. Because of this additional deal, 4Kids provided programming for both The CW and Fox in the 2008–09 season giving 4Kids nine hours of combined children's programming on two broadcast networks. The new block, The CW4Kids, started May 24, 2008.

In March 2008, 4Kids acquired the next Yu-Gi-Oh! entry, Yu-Gi-Oh! 5Ds, for US broadcast in the fall. On November 10, 4Kids Entertainment announced that it would exit its contract with Fox and terminate its Fox programming block by the end of 2008. The final broadcast of 4Kids TV on Fox was on December 27, 2008. On December 17, the company announced that it was laying off about 15% of its workforce due to the 2008 financial crisis.

On March 22, 2010, 4Kids announced they had acquired the rights to the Korean/Japanese series Tai Chi Chasers outside of Asia. This would become the company's second CGI/2D hybrid anime series acquisition following the success of Dinosaur King, and the series would premiere at the end of 2011.

=== 2010–12: Decline and first bankruptcy ===
On May 28, 2010, the company announced that New York Stock Exchange (NYSE) trading in its common stock would be suspended before the opening of trading on June 1, 2010, thus effectively delisting the company from the New York Stock Exchange. Beginning June 1, 2010, the company began trading under the new stock symbol "KIDE" on the OTC Bulletin Board (OTCBB) market. On August 14, The CW4Kids was renamed as Toonzai, with the former name becoming secondary to the block. TC Digital Games LLC and TC Websites LLC were shut down in 2010, due to continued lack of profitability.

On January 11, 2011, the company announced that Alfred Kahn, the CEO and Chairman of the Company since March 1991, had left the company. Michael Goldstein, a member of the company's Board of Directors since March 2003, was appointed interim chairman, while the company was conducting a search for a new CEO.

On March 29, 2011, TV Tokyo and Nihon Ad Systems (NAS) sued 4Kids Entertainment, alleging that the company entered into illegal agreements with other companies, including Funimation Entertainment and Majesco, regarding the Yu-Gi-Oh! anime franchise. TV Tokyo claimed that those agreements allowed 4Kids to collect royalties without paying a portion of those royalties to TV Tokyo, which violates their original agreement. The companies were seeking almost $5 million in "underpayments, wrongful deductions, and unmet obligations." As part of the suit, the companies terminated the Yu-Gi-Oh! license from 4Kids. Neither Funimation nor Majesco was listed as defendants in the case. 4Kids Entertainment informed the licensors on March 27, that their termination letter was "wrongful and devoid of any factual and legal basis", and that they had not given 4Kids 10 days' notice as required. 4Kids further revealed that they had made a good-faith payment of $1 million and agreed to a March 18 meeting in place of a lawsuit, which TV Tokyo and NAS nevertheless decided to go ahead with. The company also stated that even if the termination is found to be valid, the company is prepared to do whatever it takes to stay in business.

On April 6, 4Kids announced that they had filed for Chapter 11 bankruptcy protection. 4Kids requested that the court suspend co-licensor Asatsu DK's attempts to exercise control of the Yu-Gi-Oh! franchise in the United States, particularly in terms of selling the rights to the latest anime series, Yu-Gi-Oh! Zexal, which was due to be pitched at the Licensing International Expo on June 14. However, on June 2, bankruptcy judge Shelley Chapman issued a court order on TV Tokyo and NAS for an automatic stay on the U.S. Yu-Gi-Oh! license and said that the trial will proceed in two phases. The first phase is whether the contractual termination was valid, and the second is how much money 4Kids would owe the companies. The first phase of the trial began on August 29, 2011. On October 27, 4Kids and the executives of former financial company Lehman Brothers reached a deal, after Lehman had improperly invested most of 4Kids' funds in auction rate securities. 4Kids received $500,000 from the deal. Chapman later ruled that the Yu-Gi-Oh! license is still in effect due to TV Tokyo, NAS, and ADK not terminating the agreement properly.

On February 29, 2012, there was an amicable settlement of the lawsuit between 4Kids Entertainment and Asatsu-DK (ADK) and TV Tokyo over the license of the Yu-Gi-Oh! property. On May 1, Kidsco Media Ventures LLC, an affiliate of Saban Capital Group, placed a bid to acquire some of 4Kids' assets, including the US rights to the Yu-Gi-Oh! franchise and The CW4Kids block, for $10 million. On June 5, 2012, 4Kids commenced an auction between Kidsco and 4K Acquisition, which was then adjourned so 4Kids, Kidsco, and 4K Acquisition could consider an alternative transaction. On June 15, 4Kids filed a notice outlining a proposed deal in which its assets would be divided between Kidsco and 4K Acquisition which was finalized on June 26, 2012. The deal saw 4K Acquisition acquire the US rights to the Yu-Gi-Oh! franchise and KidsCo acquire 4Kids' other assets including the agreements for Dragon Ball Z, Sonic X, Cubix and The CW Network's Toonzai Saturday morning programming block. The Toonzai block ended on August 18, 2012, and the newly-programmed Saban Brands strand, Vortexx, ran as a final Saturday morning cartoon block on The CW from August 25, 2012, to September 27, 2014, before being replaced by One Magnificent Morning on October 4, 2014.

On August 14, 2012, it was announced through a quarterly report that 4Kids Entertainment had discontinued operations of four operating divisions: 4Kids Ad Sales Inc., 4Kids Productions Inc., 4Kids Entertainment Music Inc., and 4Kids Entertainment Home Video, Inc. due to their continued lack of profitability. On September 13, 2012, it was revealed through a quarterly report that on August 16, 2012, the Board of Directors of 4Kids Entertainment determined to discontinue the operations of its UK subsidiary, 4Kids Entertainment International Ltd., which became effective on September 30, 2012. On December 5, 2012, 4Kids Entertainment announced that it had ended a dispute (over the so-called Pokémon agreement) with The Pokémon Company International under which TPCi will get a $1 million general unsecured claim against the debtor.

=== 2012–17: Rebrand as 4Licensing Corporation, second bankruptcy and closure ===
4Licensing Corporation logo

A meeting was scheduled on December 13, 2012, to confirm 4Kids' plan to exit bankruptcy. The same day, the New York bankruptcy judge sent 4Kids Entertainment Inc. on its way out of Chapter 11 protection, overruling an objection by the American Kennel Club Inc. over a licensing agreement and approving its reorganization plan, which calls for the full payment of claims.

On December 21, 4Kids Entertainment was renamed 4Licensing Corporation, which represented the company's new status as a licensing firm and no longer produced or dubbed television shows. The 4Kids brand was retained for its own licensing division, which handled youth-related products and retained the rights to properties its parent company never sold during the bankruptcy. 4Sight Solutions remained for older-skewing products.

In May 2013, the company renamed its ad-sales division, 4Kids Ad Sales, Inc. to 4LC Sports & Entertainment, Inc. This new division would focus on licensing products for the sports and entertainment industries. Additional subsidiaries formed in 2013 included Pinwrest Development Group, LLC, which developed an impact-blocking surface named isoBLOX and 4LC Technology, Inc., which would focus on the mobile gaming market.

On September 21, 2016, 4Licensing Corporation filed for Chapter 11 bankruptcy; the bankruptcy plan became effective on February 7, 2017, and the company immediately ceased operations thereafter.

== Licenses and productions ==
4Kids Entertainment licensed a wide variety of media products, ranging from video games and television programs to toy lines featuring the Royal Air Force. 4Kids focused on licensing content for the children's market. including content for both boys and girls. Many of its licenses came from dubs of Japanese anime, including Fighting Foodons, and Shaman King, while others are Western animations or properties like Chaotic or Back to the Future: The Animated Series.

Most programs were either licensed out to local stations, or broadcast on their dedicated programming block 4Kids TV. Typically, 4Kids would retain several properties on hiatus (such as Yu-Gi-Oh! GX), or in production to allow for turnover of their existing products. 4Kids also licensed, and merchandised, a number of non-animation based products, such as calendars like The Dog, and toys like Cabbage Patch Kids.

=== Back catalogues ===
- FilmRise
- Shout! Studios
- RLJE Films
- The Pokémon Company
- Konami (Konami Cross Media NY)
- Discotek Media
- Hasbro (Hasbro Entertainment)
- Viz Media
- Media Blasters
- Crunchyroll (formerly Funimation)

== Executive management ==
This is a list of Chief Executive Officers that ran 4Kids Entertainment.

=== Chief executive officers ===
- June 1990 – December 1990: Bobby Kotick
- March 12, 1991 – January 11, 2011: Alfred R. Kahn
- January 11, 2011 – September 30, 2012: Michael Goldstein
- October 16, 2012 – February 29, 2016: Bruce R. Foster

== Criticisms and controversies ==
Comparison of the same scene in One Piece. Original Japanese version (top) and 4Kids edit of what could be perceived as blackface (below).

During its operation as 4Kids Entertainment, the company faced intense criticism from viewers over the company's extensive editing and localization of the anime and other non-American series they licensed. Practices like censorship, story editing, music editing, and "Americanization" of Japanese culture references were common. One example included characters eating onigiri while commenting that they were eating jelly doughnuts in their dub of the original Pokémon anime.

At the 2019 Fan Expo Canada, Eric Stuart, who was the voice of Brock and James in the 4Kids dub of Pokémon, the voice of Seto Kaiba in the English dub of Yu-Gi-Oh!, and who was also part of the production side, mentioned why 4Kids' dubs had this censorship. He explained that American culture has a different sensitivity to certain content compared to Japanese culture, and networks on Saturday mornings had standards that would forbid certain inappropriate content like firearms, sexual references, religious references, display or mention of death, alcohol, cigarettes, and other content that is considered offensive to American audiences. As the censorship is dictated by the networks and not the production company itself, 4Kids would submit the scripts and footage of their dubs to the networks their dubs air on, and then the executives of those networks would review them. After they reviewed it, they would tell 4Kids to cut out certain scenes and edit inappropriate content to something particular like changing Sanji's cigarette to a lollipop in One Piece, or changing a stone that looks like a cross to something non-religious for their dubs to pass the network's standards. Stuart also pointed out that Pokémon, and anime as a whole, would not be as wildly popular as it is today if companies like 4Kids did not air it on network television instead of being in the back of a video store.

At the 2016 Metrocon, Eric Stuart also explained the "Americanization" in 4Kids' dubs. He stated that those edits were international edits. When companies like 4Kids purchase the licensing to Japanese anime, the anime not only was redubbed into English but also redubbed into multiple languages because companies like 4Kids were used to distribute the anime to other countries by using their dubs and licensing them to other countries to have their dubs be used to distribute the anime. The Japanese food products being changed, and Japanese references being removed were requested by those Japanese anime companies because they wanted their anime to be distributed worldwide and wanted international audiences to relate to their products much easier. So, while the Japanese anime companies removed the Japanese text on signs, 4Kids removed the scenes involving Japanese references and changed the names of the Japanese food products like rice balls to something more international like donuts while only occasionally changing the animation to save on costs.

A March 2006 study by the Parents Television Council, a conservative advocacy group, on violence in children's television programs claimed that the 4Kids dub of Shaman King was still too violent for children.
