= Sophia Crawford (stuntwoman) =

British actress and stuntwoman

- Born: Sophia Matilda Crawford; 19 May 1966 (age 59); Hammersmith, London, England
- Occupations: Actress, stuntwoman
- Spouse: Jeff Pruitt (1998–)

Sophia Crawford (born 19 May 1966 in Hammersmith, London) is an English actress and stuntwoman. She was Sarah Michelle Gellar's stunt double on the first four seasons of Buffy the Vampire Slayer. She married Buffy stunt coordinator Jeff Pruitt in 1998. She is also known for her role as Chameleon, one of the fighters on WMAC Masters and performing on the TV series Mighty Morphin Power Rangers. She starred opposite Steven Vincent Leigh in Sword of Honor in 1996. She also doubled for Fergie in the 2006 movie Poseidon. As of April 2025, she owns and operates a coffee shop in Roswell, GA.

== Filmography ==
- The Cyprus Tigers (1990)
- New Kids in Town (1990)
- Mission of Justice (1992)
- The Big Deal (1992)
- Angel Terminators 2 (1993)
- Beauty Investigator (1993)
- Sword of Honor (1996)
