= Teenage Mutant Ninja Turtles (2003 TV series) season 6 =

Teenage Mutant Ninja Turtles: Fast Forward
- Season 6
- No. of episodes: 26

Release
- Original network: 4Kids TV
- Original release: July 29, 2006 – October 27, 2007

Season chronology
- ← Previous; Ninja Tribunal Next → Season 7

The sixth season of the 2003 animated Teenage Mutant Ninja Turtles, subtitled Fast Forward, originally aired between July 29, 2006, and October 27, 2007, beginning with the episode "Future Shellshock." The season-long plot line sees the Turtles and Splinter transported a century in the future, where they become allies with Cody Jones, the teenage great-grandson of longtime allies April O'Neil and Casey Jones, protecting him from the machinations of his unscrupulous uncle, who seeks to take over the large company Cody has inherited. The season is lighter in tone and less violent than previous ones, with a greater emphasis on jokes, and includes revised designs for all returning characters.

The season was originally planned to air one year later, but to try to increase interest in the series, Fox's 4Kids TV started airing this season a year earlier instead of the "Ninja Tribunal" arc. This season became the fifth season to air on commercial television even though it was the sixth season produced. After the scheduling change was made, Mirage and its partners decided to finish production on the "Ninja Tribunal" episodes and release them directly to DVD. 4Kids Entertainment later signed a deal with Comcast and that season began airing on Comcast-On-Demand in August 2006, although airings would suspend after five episodes. Thus, mass confusion has ensued regarding which season is officially season five and which is season six. Chronologically, this season comes after the "Ninja Tribunal" season.

The episodes were released in partial season DVD sets. Volume 1, named "TMNT Fast Forward: Future Shellshock!", was released on February 6, 2007, and had the first thirteen episodes, and volume 2, named "TMNT Fast Forward: Day of the Awakening", was released on August 7, 2007, and had the remaining thirteen episodes.

== Story ==
Having suddenly transported 100 years into the future, the Turtles and Splinter arrive in the year 2105, where they befriend Cody Jones, heir to a vast tech company called O'Neil Tech and the great-grandson of April O'Neil and Casey Jones, and his fussy yet loyal English-accented robotic servant Serling. Due to the multispecies population of New New York City, the Turtles can openly move about and interact with everyday people. As the Turtles and Splinter try to help Cody make a time portal for them to return to the 21st Century, they must uncover the suspicious criminal activities being carried out by Cody's greedy uncle Darius Dun. Aiding Darius is the Inuwashi Gunjin, avian-themed warriors from an endangered species that are initially enslaved by Darius before being freed by the Turtles.

Other enemies the Turtles must contend with are the Kanabo warlord Sh'Okanabo and his sentient computer virus ally Viral, who seek to unleash the "Day of Awakening" on Earth. However, it becomes apparent that a combination of sunlight and Earth's oxygen-based atmosphere is preventing the Kanabo symbiosis from occurring. Darius is eventually presented with the Dark Turtles, ferocious clones of the Turtles created by Sh'Okanabo as minions, in return for the blueprints to the Time Window. Though he manages to create a Time Portal of his own, but goes haywire and opens multiple rifts in time. While dealing with a time-displaced Utrom Shredder, the Turtles neutralize the unstable Time Window and seemingly destroy Sh'Okanabo in the process.

With Darius losing his patience after ultimately being exposed and forced into hiding, Dark Leo attempts to destroy the Turtles from within. However, their kindness touches him enough to start treating the other Dark Turtles the same way. The Turtles eventually learn from President Bishop, a future equivalent of Agent Bishop and president of the Pan Galactic Alliance, that Sh'Okanabo survived his seeming destruction and has escaped to the dark side of the moon, where he has taken over the moon base. Cody, Serling, and President Bishop neutralize Viral using a Decompiler program and prevent Earth from being shrouded in darkness. The Turtles and Splinter manage to eradicate Sh'Okanabo and cure his army, averting the Day of Awakening and saving Earth.

Other notable futuristic enemies and allies include Starlee Hambrath, an O'Neil Tech intern from the planet Omatran; Constable Biggles, a robotic police officer and leader of the Peacekeepers; Jammerhead, an eccentric cyborg thug and leader of the Street Phantoms criminal gang; Torbin Zixx; a charismatic intergalactic smuggler and mercenary; Triple Threat, a three-headed alien wrestler; Boss Zukko, a Triceraton gangster who has a history with Zixx; and a future equivalent of Baxter Stockman, who has been transformed into a cycloptic brain-headed squid-like creature.

== Cast ==
=== Main ===
- Michael Sinterniklaas as Leonardo: the leader of the Turtles who wields twin katana swords and a blue mask. (Appears in all 26 episodes.)
- Sam Riegel as Donatello: the Turtles' genius engineer who is the primary source of their devices and vehicles who wields a bo staff and a purple mask. (Appears in all 26 episodes.)
- Frank Frankson as Raphael: The most stubborn and temperamental of the four turtles who wields twin sai and a red mask. (Appears in all 26 episodes.)
- Wayne Grayson as Michelangelo: the Turtles' and wise guy and a large source of comic relief who wields twin nunchucks and an orange mask. (Appears in all 26 episodes.)

=== Supporting ===
- Christopher C. Adams as Cody Jones: the great-grandson of April O'Neil and Casey Jones, who lives in the year 2105 and helps the Turtles survive in the future. (23 episodes)
- Marc Thompson as Serling: Cody's fussy yet loyal English-accented robotic servant who becomes constantly infuriated by the Turtles. (20 episodes)
- Darren Dunstan as Splinter: the Turtles' sensei and adopted father. (18 episodes)

=== Villains ===
- Sean Schemmel as Sh'Okonabo: a Kanabo warlord scheming to unleash the "Day of Awakening", when his race bond with and assimilate the inhabitants of a planet before draining its resources to the brink of devastation. (8 episodes)
- Eva Kaminsky as Viral: a sentient computer virus allied with Sh'Okonabo. (6 episodes)
- David Zen Mansley as
  - Darius Dun: Cody's greedy uncle who despises the Turtles. (9 episodes)
  - Triple Threat Green: the green-skinned, cycloptic middle head of Triple Threat, who has cybernetic parts and acts as the main head of the three-headed alien wrestler. (3 episodes)
- Marc Odgers as Triple Threat Red: the red and grey-skinned right head of Triple Threat, who has dreadlocks and a short temper. (3 episodes)
- Tom Wayland as Jammerhead: an eccentric cyborg thug and leader of the Street Phantoms criminal gang. (4 episodes)
- Michael Sinterniklaas as Dark Leo: a Kanabo clone of Leo and the leader of the Dark Turtles. (3 episodes)
- Sam Riegel as
  - Dark Donnie: a Kanabo clone of Donnie. (3 episodes)
  - Triple Threat Yellow: the yellow-skinned left head of Triple Threat, who has red eyes, a metal chin, and a mischievous personality. (3 episodes)
- Frank Frankson as Dark Raph: a Kanabo clone of Raph. (3 episodes)
- Wayne Grayson as Dark Mikey: a Kanabo clone of Mikey (3 episodes)
- Shawn Curran as Boss Zukko, a Triceraton gangster who has a history with Zixx.

=== Recurring ===
- Sean Schemmel as Constable Biggles: a robotic police officer and leader of the Peacekeepers. (13 episodes)
- Amanda Brown as Starlee Hambrath: a bright and highly intelligent O'Neil Tech intern from the planet Omatran and Cody's friend who also has feelings for him. (5 episodes)
- David Elliott as Torbin Zixx: a charismatic intergalactic smuggler and mercenary who serves as both an adversary and an ally to the Turtles. (3 episodes)
- David Zen Mansley as Bishop: the president of the Pan Galactic Alliance, a federation that controls several galaxies all over the universe. He was formerly a black ops agent in charge of the Earth Protection Force, an organization devoted to defending Earth from alien invasion. (3 episodes)

=== Guest ===
- Veronica Taylor as April O'Neil: an ally of the Turtles who enters a relationship with Casey Jones.
- Marc Thompson as
  - Casey Jones: an ally of the Turtles who enters a relationship with April O'Neil.
  - Juto Shisho: a member of the Ninja Tribunal and master of weapons.
- Scottie Ray as Ch'rell / The Utrom Shredder: the leader of the Foot Clan who appears in "Clash of the Turtle Titans" and "Timing is Everything" before his banishing in "Exodus, Part 2."
- Scott Williams as Baxter Stockman: a brilliant scientist who survived to the year 2105.
- Karen Neill as Karai: the Utrom Shredder's adopted daughter.
- Terrance Archie as Silver Sentry: the leader of the Justice Force and a friend of Michelangelo.
- Lenore Zann as Chikara Shisho: a member of the Ninja Tribunal and master of strength.
- David Zen Mansley as Hun: the leader of the Purple Dragons.

== Crew ==
Teenage Mutant Ninja Turtles: Fast Forward was produced by Mirage Studios & 4Kids Entertainment and was aired on Fox's Saturday morning kids' block in the US. The producers were Gary Richardson, Frederick U. Fierst, and Joellyn Marlow for the American team; Tae Ho Han was the producer for the Korean team.

== Episodes ==
No. overall	No. in season	Title	Directed by	Written by	Original release date	Prod. code	K6–11 rating/share
117	1	"Future Shellshock"	Roy Burdine	Marty Isenberg	July 29, 2006	118	0.7/4
In the middle of a particularly heated argument over which TV programs to watch, the Turtles and Splinter are abruptly transported to the year 2105 by a time machine unwittingly created by Cody Jones, heir to the vast O'Neil-Jones business empire and great-grandson of April O'Neil and Casey Jones. As the Turtles get separated upon their arrival, Mikey finds himself ambushed by the Street Phantoms, a gang of cloaked thieves led by Jammerhead. Leo, Donnie, Raph, and Splinter must rendezvous with Cody and his robotic servant Serling and adapt to their new surroundings before setting out on a desperate rescue mission.
118	2	"Obsolete"	Roy Burdine	Adam Beechen	August 5, 2006	119	N/A
Hoping to fix the Time Window and return home, the Turtles sneak out with Cody and go to O'Neil Tech, where they meet intern Starlee Hambrath. Wanting them away from Cody and in his lab for study, Cody's uncle Darius Dunn unleashes a group of avian-themed mercenaries known as the Inuwashi Gunjin against the Turtles. However, Darius gets more than he bargained for when the Gunjin turn on him and kidnap Cody instead. With Starlee's help, the Turtles use 22nd Century technology to create new ninja weapons in preparation for a desperate rescue mission.
119	3	"Home Invasion"	Roy Burdine	Rich Fogel	August 12, 2006	120	N/A
Raphael is impatient with the highly automated future, especially when Cody builds the Turtles a fancy new Dojo complete with realistic holographic simulation battle programs. Unfortunately, a sentient computer virus named Viral takes over Cody's building and traps the Turtles inside the Dojo. Raph's worst fears are realized when the simulations are turned into a deadly high-tech prison, and the Turtles have to fight for their lives in one battle simulation with attack drones resembling anthropomorphic animals from the Wild West.
120	4	"Headlock Prime"	Roy Burdine	Steven Melching	September 30, 2006	121	1.1/5
When a homesick Raph cannot resist an ad for a pro-wrestling tournament, Leo tags along at Splinter's suggestion. However, it turns out that wrestling 22nd century-style is more about body language than actual physical fighting. Things are livened up when banned three-headed alien wrestler Triple Threat crashes the arena to prove himself and steal the box office receipts, prompting Raph and Leo to stop the crazed powerhouse any way they can.
121	5	"Playtime's Over"	Roy Burdine	Julia Lewald	October 7, 2006	122	0.8/4
Obsessed with the video game Helix, Mikey goes crackers when he finds out that the sequel is being released. Needing a guide in navigating the humongous Levellex Mall, the Turtles and Cody enlist Starlee's help, who uses it to go on date with Cody. However, Jammerhead and the Street Phantoms hijack the delivery trucks full of Helix 2 and frame the Turtles. Sporting his own personal Turtle-X Armor, Cody must help the Turtles defeat the Street Phantoms and prove their innocence to Constable Biggles and his Peacekeepers.
122	6	"Bishop to Knight"	Roy Burdine	Steve Murphy	October 14, 2006	123	1.3/7
The Turtles are shocked to find that their old enemy Bishop is alive and well in 2105. However, he has become president of the Pan-Galactic Council, an organization dedicated to peace between alien species. Furthermore, he needs their help tracking down the charismatic intergalactic smuggler and mercenary Torbin Zixx. When Zixx delivers a bomb to the South Street Moonport, they quickly learn thateven in the future, nothing is as it seems.
123	7	"Night of Sh'Okanabo"	Roy Burdine	Michael Ryan	October 21, 2006	124	0.8/4
When Mikey finds out that Cody has never seen a horror flick, the boisterous movie aficionado drags Cody and his three brothers downtown for a little horror movie festival viewing. What the Turtles do not expect is that their horror movie festival is going to turn into the real thing when they meet Sh'okanabo face to face.
124	8	"Clash of the Turtle Titans"	Roy Burdine	Marty Isenberg	October 28, 2006	125	0.8/3
Mikey discovers someone has taken over his old superhero persona, Turtle Titan, and sets off to deal with the "imposter". Even though the new Turtle Titan appears to be much more mature and responsible than Mikey will ever be, Mikey must put his jealousy aside when Triple Threat strikes.
125	9	"Fly Me to the Moon"	Roy Burdine	Rich Fogel	November 4, 2006	126	1.0/4
The Turtles and Cody go to the Moon in search of a rare lunar alloy only to run into the Inuwashi Gunjin, who have been sent by Darius Dun to make sure that they never come back alive. However, during the chase, the Gunjin discover something peculiar yet honorable about the Turtles' relationship with Cody.
126	10	"Invasion of the Body Snatcher!" (Note: Formerly called "Invasion of the Bodyjacker".)	Roy Burdine	Roger Slifer	November 11, 2006	127	1.2/5
Jammerhead takes identity theft to a whole new level when he gets his hands on the Bodyjacker. With the ultimate stealth device in his possession, he plans to take over Darius Dun's body in order to infiltrate O'Neil Tech and steal its greatest secrets. When the Turtles begrudgingly attempt to rescue Darius, they discover what appears to be a covert weapons-building program run by Darius himself.
127	11	"The Freaks Come Out at Night" (Note: Formerly called "The Freaks Come Out at Night...")	Roy Burdine	Marty Isenberg	November 25, 2006	128	1.2/5
After an outing downtown, Mikey starts behaving super strength, green-slime-spewing strangely. The Turtles discover that Mikey has been "implanted" by one of Sh'Okanabo's "gene-seeds" in a bid to propagate his alien race and transform ordinary folks into monstrous Kanabo drones. The Turtles must stop him and rescue their brother before becoming "implanted" themselves.
128	12	"Bad Blood"	Roy Burdine	Roland Gonzalez	December 2, 2006	129	0.9/4
Frustrated with the Turtles, Darius Dun is approached by Sh'Okanabo, who forms a partnership with him by presenting the Dark Turtles, enhanced Kanabo clones of the Turtles possessing their fighting styles and memories. When Darius leads the Turtles into an ambush, they find themselves at a stalemate with the Dark Turtles. With Splinter and Serling wrongfully arrested by the Peacekeepers, Cody must put his Ninja training and a little detective skill to good use.
129	13	"The Journal"	Roy Burdine	Steve Murphy	December 9, 2006	130	1.2/4
While rooting around in Cody's Trophy Room, the Turtles come across a journal written by April and Casey, which describes their lives when they return to the past. Despite Splinter's warning that knowing their future could be dangerous, the guys set about reading it. However, they find that their future back in the past will be all but rosy.
130	14	"The Gaminator"	Roy Burdine	Wendell Morris	December 16, 2006	131	1.4/6
The Turtles get their hands on a prototype game system called "The Gaminator," a virtual reality rumored to be the ultimate gaming experience. However, they get more than they bargained for when they are digitized and sucked into the game. As Cody and Serling try to assist the Turtles, they discover that the Gaminator is actually a trap set by Viral so that she could defeat them on her own turf.
131	15	"Graduation Day: Class of 2105" (Note: Formerly called "Graduation Day".)	Roy Burdine	Julia Lewald	March 24, 2007	132	1.3/6
Splinter is pleased to announce that the Turtles are about to graduate from the ninja rank of Genin to the more advanced rank of Chunin. However, Mikey will not be graduating with his brothers since he has been too busy playing video games instead of training. To bring their brother up to speed, the Turtles test him in a series of challenges in order to understand the true meaning of Ninjutsu.
132	16	"Timing Is Everything"	Roy Burdine	Joe Kelly	March 31, 2007	133	1.3/5
Having gained the plans from Darius Dun, Sh'Okanabo and Viral have created their version of Cody's Time Window. However, they accidentally unleash a "time storm" on New New York City, causing portals to various random points across time to start opening up. With the Turtles smack in the middle of the chaos, they must shut down the Time Window while contending with Sh'Okanabo, Viral, and even a time-displaced Utrom Shredder.
133	17	"Enter the Jammerhead"	Roy Burdine	Julia Lewald	April 7, 2007	134	1.4/6
Having been busted out of prison by his Street Phantoms, Jammerhead is looking to even the score with the Turtles. Thanks to a newly-developed chip, he can upload and instantly mimic the moves of the best martial artists. The Turtles must figure out how to beat this new and improved Jammerhead as Starlee's alien family visits Earth.
134	18	"Milk Run" (Note: Formerly called "The Milk Run".)	Roy Burdine	Steven Melching	April 14, 2007	135	1.3/5
Torbin Zixx enlists the Turtles' help in smuggling a ship full of humanitarian aid past Triceraton space gangsters led by Boss Zukko. Considering that Zukko is obsessed with finding Zixx, the Turtles must help their unlikely ally escape and complete his mission.
135	19	"The Fall of Darius Dunn" (Note: Formerly called "The Fall of Darius Dun".)	Roy Burdine	Rich Fogel	April 21, 2007	136	1.5/6
When investigating a secret weapons manufacturing program run by Darius Dunn, the Turtles and Cody find that Darius has been hiding it from the Peacekeepers using cloaking technology that allows two different rooms to occupy the same space. As Cody clashes with Darius over control of the vast O'Neil Tech empire, the Turtles must figure out how to effectively battle the Dark Turtles without stalemates.
136	20	"Turtle X-Tinction"	Roy Burdine	Marty Isenberg	April 28, 2007	137	1.2/5
The Turtles and Serling are working on a surprise birthday party for Cody when Turtle X suddenly goes on a rampage. Learning that this was due to a "Trojan Horse" virus planted by Darius Dun, Raph and Splinter confront Darius. Meanwhile, Leo, Mikey and Serling must contend with the deadly Turtle X long enough for Donnie and Starlee to craft and anti-virus program. However, the prospect becomes made all the more difficult when Cody gets trapped inside Turtle X.
137	21	"Race for Glory" (Note: Formerly called "Race for Glory!")	Roy Burdine	Larry Hama	September 8, 2007	138	1.4/6
The Turtles enter a tricked-out Hovershell in a cross-country road race that pits the latest high-tech experimental vehicles against one another. Unfortunately, the fun and games quickly turn serious when Triple Threat decides to crash the race and steal all the cars.
138	22	"Head of State"	Roy Burdine	John Drdek	September 15, 2007	139	1.2/5
When President Bishop is attacked by mysterious underground monsters, the Turtles must rescue his before he (literally) loses his head to another sinister figure from the Turtles' past: Baxter Stockman.
139	23	"DNA is Thicker than Water"	Roy Burdine	Roland Gonzalez	October 6, 2007	140	1.2/5
With the Dark Turtles' failures being placed on his spikey shoulders by Darius Dun, Dark Leo must prove that he is an apt leader and devises a plan to destroy the Turtles from within by being wounded and captured. While being nursed back to health, Dark Leo's time with the Turtles causes him to have second thoughts about the enterprise.
140	24	"The Cosmic Completist"	Roy Burdine	James Felder	October 13, 2007	141	1.6/6
Though he has nothing but contempt for Mikey's geeky toy collection, Raph must think like a geek in order to rescue the Inawashi Gunjin from malevolent alien and self-proclaimed ultimate collector Aramzedo.
141	25	"The Day of Awakening"	Roy Burdine	Steve Murphy	October 20, 2007	142	1.5/7
When the entire population of Moonbase Bishop goes missing, it appears that Sh'Okanabo has returned and jump-started the Day of Awakening, his plan to take over the Earth. As they stage an assault on the base, the Turtles, Splinter, and President Bishop find a bigger and badder Sh'Okanabo with Viral and an army of Kanabo Drones hiding on the dark side of the Moon.
142	26	"Zixxth Sense"	Roy Burdine	Rich Fogel	October 27, 2007	143	N/A
Torbin Zixx convinces the Turtles to help him recover an experimental matter transmitter that he was forced to give to Triceraton space gangster Boss Zukko to pay off an old debt. Though the fate of the world may rest on the success of their mission, the Turtles must first have to trust Zixx.

=== Unproduced episodes ===
An additional set of 10 episodes was originally in production and intended to be aired on 4Kids TV in fall 2007. However, the episodes were scrapped mid-production and only a storyboard animatic of one of the episodes ("Master Fighter 2105") was released through the Rewards Plaza of the 4Kids website.

No.	Title
1	"Master Fighter 2105"
In an effort to cheer up Mikey, the Turtles and Cody use the Dojo to create a battle simulation based on his favorite hi-chop-socky martial arts film series Master Fighter. However, a surprisingly-alive Viral brings the Master Fighter Practice Bot to "life", causing him to play out the storyline of the films he was created from and interpret the Turtles as his mortal enemies. While Cody and Serling venture into cyberspace to severe Viral's control, Master Splinter must confront the ultimate martial arts master to save his sons. Note: Production of this episode was not completed, but the animatic of it is available on YouTube.
2	"Something Wicked"
In deep space, a Triceraton freighter detects life signs coming from a lone asteroid and unintentionally finds their greatest and oldest archenemy: Ch'rell the Utrom Shredder. After taking over the Triceraton ship and enslaving the crew, Ch'rell creates a new organic, cyborg Triceraton-like body. When the reborn Shredder (nicknamed "Trishreddatron") plots a course for New Manhattan to exact revenge on the Turtles, they receive word of his resurrection from some old Utrom allies, including Captain Mortu and their long-lost comrade Leatherhead. Note: Though production of this episode was not completed, both this episode's title and a flashback featuring the Utrom Shredder and Karai were reused for an episode of Back to the Sewer, while the plot was modified.
3	"Bounty Huntin'"
When Boss Zukko collects the bounty on Torbin Zixx by handing him over to an unscrupulous criminal kingpin, the Turtles get suckered into mounting a rescue mission. But Zukko keeps capturing Zixx again and again, turning Zixx over to different gangs of thugs, aliens, and crime syndicates and the Turtles keep having to spring Zixx. Discovering that Zixx and Zukko have been working together since the very beginning, collecting and splitting millions of credits from all of the bounties on Zixx's head, the Turtles must teach the duo a (hopefully painful) lesson. Note: Production of this episode was not completed.
4	"Turtles, Turtles Everywhere"
Using his technological know-how, Darius Dun creates the high-tech versions of the Turtles known as the Tech Turtles. Finding themselves being hunted by the Tech Turtles, the now-obsolete Dark Turtles have no choice but to turn to the original Turtles for help. While working alongside their counterparts, the Dark Turtles must learn from their genetic brothers what honor and sacrifice are truly about. Note: Production of this episode was not completed.
5	"Law and Disorder"
The Turtles find themselves under attack by the Peacekeepers when Jammerhead reprograms Constable Biggles to assist the Street Phantoms in taking them down. Though they have not seen eye-to-optic before, the Turtles must free Biggles from Jammerhead's grasp while battling both the Street Phantoms and the Peacekeepers. Note: Production of this episode was not completed.
6	"The Devil and Dr. Stockman"
Recently installed into a new body provided by his "good friend" President Bishop, a chipper Stockman finds himself anxious to begin his new life as one of the "good guys" and invites himself along to an intergalactic Science Expo with the Turtles. But when they get stranded on a hostile planet by the Utrom Shredder, Stockman must choose to either rejoin his old master or help the Turtles survive. Note: Production of this episode was not completed.
7	"The Incredible Shrinking Serling"
Serling becomes the guinea pig in a series of Time Window experiments conducted by the Turtles and Cody. Targeting the precise point in time is more difficult than one thinks, as he is both shrunken to action figure size and sent to the prehistoric age. Though he is spared from a T-Rex when he is pulled through time and materializes in the Turtles' Lair, Serling discovers to his disappointment that he has arrived at a point when the Turtles were still kids. To make matters worse, he has temporarily lost motor functions. When the Turtle Tots tap him as their favorite new toy, Serling must clandestinely work to save the mischievous foursome as they get into all sorts of trouble. Note: Though production of this episode was not completed, the script was later salvaged and repurposed into an episode of Back to the Sewer bearing the same title.
8	"A Question of Honor"
The Turtles team up with the ninja-rabbit Usagi in a deep-space adventure. Note: Production of this episode was not completed.
9	"City Under Siege / Con Space"
While being deported from the Earth, Triple Threat hijacks the prisoner transport shuttle he is being carried. Rallying the other convicted alien thugs on board, he sets out on the greatest crime spree New New York has ever seen. Desperate to keep order in the city, President Bishop seeks help from the Turtles as well as the Turtle Titan. Note: Though production of this episode was not completed, this episode's title was reused for an episode of Back to the Sewer, while the plot was modified.
10	"Homeward Bound"
When Cody mysteriously fluxes out of existence, the Turtles double their efforts on repairing the Time Window so they could at least rescue him. However, Darius Dun, the Tech Turtles, and the Utrom Shredder are closing in on the Time Window. In order to defeat their enemies and rescue Cody, the Turtles must seek help from Usagi, Leatherhead, the Utroms, and even the Dark Turtles. Note: Production of this episode was not completed.
