= Teenage Mutant Ninja Turtles: Ninja Tribunal =

- No. of episodes: 12

Release
- Original network: 4Kids TV
- Original release: August 7, 2006 – May 2, 2008

Season chronology
- ← Previous; Season 4 Next → Season 6

The Ninja Tribunal arc was the fifth season of the 2003 Teenage Mutant Ninja Turtles animated series.

In an attempt to renew interest in the series, "Fast Forward" became the fifth season to air on commercial TV, while Mirage and its partners decided to finish production on the "Ninja Tribunal" episodes and release them directly to DVD. 4Kids Entertainment later signed a deal with Comcast and this season began airing on Comcast-On-Demand on August 7, 2006, although only five episodes would air.

The "Ninja Tribunal" episodes were scheduled to be released on DVD sometime in early 2007, but 4Kids Entertainment later removed them from their release schedule. The episodes would eventually be broadcast on 4Kids TV, starting on February 16, 2008, where it was promoted in commercials as "The Lost Episodes," with episodes 111–116 making their debuts. However, prior to this, episode 110 "Membership Drive," would premiere on TV on March 24, 2007. The DVD set was released on May 20, 2008.

The "Nightmares Recycled" episode was never completed. The script was finished and some animation had begun when 4Kids pulled the plug because it was deemed too controversial and violent for a children's program (the plot would reveal that Hun and the Garbageman were conjoined twins that were surgically separated at birth by a back-alley surgeon with the Garbageman being discarded as "garbage"). Since there was no chance of it airing, it was shelved in the early stages of production.

== Story ==
Following on from the previous season's cliffhanger ending, the Turtles and the four acolytes – Joi, Feragi, Tora, and Adam – are brought to the Ninja Tribunal's monastery to begin training to combat an unknown evil. Splinter and the Ancient One arrive at the monastery, the former aggressively opposing the Turtles' affiliation with the Tribunal, because of their disinterest in aiding Hamato Yoshi against the Utrom Shredder that could have saved his life. The Tribunal proves to be aggressive and unrelenting in their training, brutally berating their acolytes for even aiding their wounded. The Tribunal finally reveals that the enemy they are preparing to face is in fact a Tengu demon that was the original incarnation of the Shredder, whose legend the Utrom Shredder manipulated to gain respect. The Tengu Shredder will be revived if his helmet and gauntlet are brought together with him, having been separated by the Tribunal millennia ago. Though the Turtles and acolytes retrieve all three relics, the Foot Mystics, revealed to be heralds of the Tengu Shredder, attack the temple, stealing the relics and seemingly killing the Tribunal and the Acolytes. The Turtles, Splinter and the Ancient One return to New York to prepare for the coming threat.

The Foot Mystics soon successfully revive the Tengu Shredder, who rampages through New York to kill Karai, who he deems an insult to his name due to her taking on the mantle in the last season. The Turtles manage to achieve a victory, repelling the Tengu Shredder and saving Karai from his wrath. However, the Tengu Shredder soon succeeds in transforming the island of New York into an infernal, Tengu-infested dominion of his; a fate which he intends to inflict upon the rest of the world. To combat this threat to Earth, the Turtles unite with the 4 acolytes (who are revealed to have miraculously survived the monastery's destruction), Hun and the Purple Dragons, the Foot Clan, Agent Bishop and the Earth Protection Force, the Justice Force, and several other allies of theirs to assault the Tengu Shredder's stronghold. After falling in battle, the Turtles are revived by Hamato Yoshi's spirit, and they manage to separate the Tengu Shredder from his helmet and gauntlet, rendering him vulnerable for Yoshi's spirit to finally end the demon's existence. The Ninja Tribunal reveal their survival as well (while the Foot Mystics could overpower them, the Tribunal lost on purpose to teach their students a lesson) and they recruit the Ancient One to serve on their tribunal. Splinter finally makes peace with the loss of his sensei after realizing he and his sons would not exist had the Tribunal assisted Yoshi. Karai parts with the Turtles on friendly terms, seemingly entering a relationship with Dr. Chaplin, and the Turtles and acolytes leave to celebrate their victory.

== Cast ==
=== Main ===
- Michael Sinterniklaas as Leonardo: the leader of the Turtles. He becomes very discouraged when his brothers unlock their powers but not him.
- Wayne Grayson as Michelangelo: the Turtles' wise guy and a source of comic relief. He is the second turtle to unlock his glowing medallion when he passed the Stealth Test.
- Sam Riegel as Donatello: the Turtles' genius engineer who is identified as the member who holds the team together as well as the first Turtle to unlock his glowing medallion.
- Greg Abbey as Raphael: The most temperamental and stubborn of the four turtles. He is the third turtle to unlock his glowing medallion when he was the first one to touch the fire dragon after Juto was talking disrespectfully about Master Splinter and him and his brothers. He and Joi may have feelings for each other.
- Darren Dunstan as Splinter: the Turtles' sensei and adopted father, who suffers from visions of the future where the turtles are murdered by the Tengu Shredder.
- David Chen as The Ancient One: an old ninjutsu master who taught Hamato Yoshi and was taught by the Ninja Tribunal. He is initially reluctant about the Ninja Tribunal taking the turtles and their new apprentices but later accepts it. After the Tribunal's destruction, he helps the turtles defeat the Tengu Shredder.

=== Supporting ===
- Hisomi-Shisho: a member of the Ninja Tribunal and master of stealth. He never speaks in the show.
- David Zen Mansley as Kon Shisho: a member of the Ninja Tribunal and master of spirit.
- Marc Thompson as
  - Juto Shisho: a member of the Ninja Tribunal and master of weapons.
  - Casey: an ally of the Turtles who enters a relationship with April.
- Lenore Zann as Chikara Shisho: a member of the Ninja Tribunal and master of strength.
- David Moo as Faraji Nagala: one of the acolytes who is training under the Ninja Tribunal alongside the Turtles who bonds with Leo.
- Britton Herring as Adam McKay: one of the acolytes who is training under the Ninja Tribunal alongside the Turtles who bonds with Donnie.
- Rebecca Soler as Joei Reynard: one of the acolytes who is training under the Ninja Tribunal alongside the Turtles. She and Raph may have feelings for each other.
- David Chen as Tora Yoshida: one of the acolytes who is training under the Ninja Tribunal alongside the Turtles and bonds with Mikey.
- Veronica Taylor as April: an ally of the Turtles who enters a relationship with Casey.
- Karen Neill as Karai: the Utrom Shredder's adopted daughter whom after his defeat vows to avenge him and takes the mantle of the Shredder and the leadership of the Foot Clan. But after being nearly murdered by the Tengu Shredder, is convinced to put her difference with the Turtles aside and join forces with them.
- Terrance Archie as Silver Sentry: the leader of the Justice Force and a friend of Michelangelo. He along with his fellow superheroes join forces with the turtles and their allies against the Tengu Shredder.

=== Villains ===
- Scottie Ray as Oroku Saki / the Tengu Shredder: the main antagonist of the series and the original incarnation of the Shredder. Initially a demon Tengu, his spirit took over the body of Oroku Saki, a former member of the Ninja Tribunal who defeated him but excepted the demon's offer for power in exchange of letting the demon live inside him. After the Tribunal sealed him away, his heralds, the Foot Mystics, have been trying to resurrect him and after they succeed, he proceeds to conquer the world and rebuild it in his own image.
- Sean Schemmel as
  - The Metal Mystic: a herald of the Shredder associated with the element of metal.
  - The Earth Mystic: a herald of the Shredder associated with the element of Earth.
  - The Fire Mystic: a herald of the Shredder associated with the element of Fire.
- Brian Maillard as
  - The Water Mystic: a herald of the Shredder associated with the element of water.
  - The Wind Mystic: a herald of the Shredder associated with the element of Wind.

=== Recurring ===
- David Zen Mansley as
  - Hun: the leader of the Purple Dragon who along with his gang reluctantly join forces with the turtles against the Tengu Shredder.
  - John Bishop: the leader of the Earth Protection Force devoted to the protection of earth against extraterrestrial races who also joins the turtles against the Tengu Shredder.
- Scott Williams as Dr. Baxter Stockman: a scientist working for the E.P.F who was formerly working for the Foot.
- Sam Riegel as Dr. Chaplin: a young scientist working for the Foot who has feelings for Karai.

== Crew ==
Teenage Mutant Ninja Turtles was produced by Mirage Studios, 4Kids Entertainment, 4Kids Productions, and Dong Woo Animation and distributed by 4Kids Entertainment and was aired on Fox's Saturday morning kids' block in the US. The producers were Gary Richardson, Frederick U. Fierst, and Joellyn Marlow for the American team; Tae Ho Han was the producer for the Korean team.

== Episodes ==
No. overall	No. in season	Title	Directed by	Written by	Original release date	Prod. code	K6–11 rating/share
105	1	"Lap of the Gods"	Roy Burdine	Christopher Yost	August 7, 2006 (Comcast-On-Demand)	105	N/A
When the turtles get abducted by the ninja tribunal they end up finding a library and in that library Donnie learns that if he focuses hard enough he will harness great power that will help him and his team of acolytes defeat a mystical dragon.
106	2	"Demons and Dragons"	Roy Burdine	Joe Kelly	August 7, 2006 (Comcast-On-Demand)	106	N/A
The Turtles begin training with the mysterious Ninja Tribunal, experimenting with new powers and weapons. After securing the first Artifact, our heroes learn to their horror that the "great evil" they are destined to face is the long-imprisoned spirit of the one, true Shredder!
107	3	"Legend of the 5 Dragons"	Roy Burdine	Danny Fingeroth	August 7, 2006 (Comcast-On-Demand)	107	N/A
The Turtles train with the Ninja Tribunal to prevent the resurrection of the Shredder. But when Splinter and the Ancient One express serious doubts about trusting the Tribunal, leaving the Turtles confused. If they all agree on the goal, why the doubts? To explain the danger to the Turtles, Splinter and the Ancient One reveal the secret history of the Tribunal… including the true origin of the Shredder!
108	4	"More Worlds Than One"	Roy Burdine	Christopher Yost	August 7, 2006 (Comcast-On-Demand)	108	N/A
The Turtles and company continue their training under the Ninja Tribunal, learning to fight in the physical as well as mental and spiritual worlds. They’re going to need that knowledge, because the second artifact of the Shredder has been found, guarded by a horde of nasty tengu demons that eat Acolytes for breakfast… literally!
109	5	"Beginning of the End"	Roy Burdine	Joe Kelly	September 20, 2006 (Comcast-On-Demand)	109	N/A
Returning to the Tribunal Monastery with the second Lost Artifact, things seem to be going well for our heroes when old foes infiltrate the monastery. With all three artifacts in the hands of evil, they plan a sneak attack on the Tribunal and their students with devastating results!
-	-	"Nightmares Recycled"	Roy Burdine	Roland Gonzalez	Unaired	110	N/A
Raph, Don, Casey, and April's evening salvage operation lands them a one-way ticket to Recycle World – the Garbageman's deadly realm of refuse! As if fighting for their lives in a world of lethal compactors and shredders wasn't bad enough, they've got to do it all with Hun – who's not thrilled to reveal that he and Garbageman have something in common - mutated DNA!: This episode was never completed because it was deemed too violent. It was the only episode of this season that never aired on television.
110	6	"Membership Drive"	Roy Burdine	Christopher Yost	March 24, 2007	111	1.3/6
The Justice Force is expanding its ranks and Mike plans on joining up as the Turtle Titan while Leo is more concerned in alerting them to the threat of the original Shredder. But when Nano reappears (thanks to Bishop and Baxter Stockman), everything quickly spirals out of control into a superhero vs. nanotech slugfest! Has Nano come back as friend or foe? And will the Turtle Titan and Leo survive long enough to find out?
111	7	"New World Order"	Roy Burdine	Danny Fingeroth	March 29, 2008	112	1.3/5
112	8	"New World Order"	Roy Burdine	Matthew Drdek	April 5, 2008	113	1.7/7
The original mystical Shredder is fully resurrected by the sinister Foot Mystics, whose first agenda is to destroy Karai, the counterfeit shredder, personally. And, while the Turtles are enemies with both of them, they realize that leaving Karai to her fate will bring Shredder's goal of creating a world of utter chaos and destruction closer to fruition. In their attempt to rescue Karai, the Turtles wind up in a raging battle filled with magic and martial arts where they use everything the Ninja Tribunal has taught them and ultimately escape with their lives, but Karai is severely wounded and Shredder decides to proceed with his plan.
113	9	"Fathers and Sons"	Roy Burdine	Roland Gonzalez	April 12, 2008	114	1.3/5
Weary after their first battle with the new Shredder, the Turtles doubt they can defeat him. To lift their spirits, Splinter and the Ancient One share a tale of the Turtles’ much younger days. The story reveals that though the Turtles were small, they overcame impossible odds to defeat a dark and mystical phantom bent on returning the one true Shredder to life, though they may not remember it.
114	10	"Past and Present"	Roy Burdine	Joe Kelly	April 19, 2008	115	1.1/5
The Shredder begins to build a new dynasty in New York, transforming the whole island into a hellish nightmare. The Turtles team up with Karai in a daring plan to direct Shredder’s own life-force energy against him from mystical "Keystones" around Manhattan, but will it be enough?
115	11	"Enter the Dragons"	Roy Burdine	Christopher Yost	April 26, 2008	116	1.1/5
116	12	"Enter the Dragons"	Roy Burdine	Christopher Yost	May 2, 2008	117	1.2/5
The demonic Shredder has transformed New York City into a nightmare version of Feudal Japan and the rest of the modern world is next. But the Turtles have a plan and with the help of their closest allies and most dangerous enemies alike, they fight their way through a demonic version of New York to confront the Shredder once and for all. The Turtles and Acolytes face the Shredder but are swiftly dispatched. As it seems Splinter will be next, master Yoshi emerges from Turtles' amulets, wounds the Shredder and revive the Turtles. Shredder summons back all of his powers, changing New York back to normal and becoming a dragon. The Turtles do the same and stall him long enough for Karai to drain him of his power and turn him back to normal. With his helmet and gauntlet destroyed, Yoshi reemerges from the amulets, shattering them, and ends the Shredder for good. With their allies and enemies going their separate ways, the Turtles and Splinter leave to celebrate.
