= List of Teenage Mutant Ninja Turtles (2003 TV series) episodes =

This is a list of episodes of the Teenage Mutant Ninja Turtles 2003 TV series. The series debuted on February 8, 2003 on the Fox Network as part of Fox's 4Kids TV Saturday morning lineup and ended on February 28, 2009. The series was produced by Mirage Studios, which owned one third of the rights to the show.

== Series overview ==
Season		Episodes	Originally aired		
Season		Episodes	First aired	Last aired	Network
1		26	February 8, 2003	November 1, 2003	Fox (FoxBox/4Kids TV)
2		26	November 8, 2003	October 2, 2004	Fox (FoxBox/4Kids TV)
3		26	October 9, 2004	April 23, 2005	Fox (FoxBox/4Kids TV)
4		26	September 10, 2005	April 15, 2006	Fox (FoxBox/4Kids TV)
5	Ninja Tribunal	12	August 7, 2006	May 2, 2008	Fox (FoxBox/4Kids TV)
6	Fast Forward	26	July 29, 2006	October 27, 2007	Fox (FoxBox/4Kids TV)
7	Back to the Sewer	13	September 13, 2008	February 28, 2009	The CW (The CW4Kids)
Turtles Forever			November 21, 2009		The CW (The CW4Kids)

== Series ==
=== Season 1 (2003) ===
Teenage Mutant Ninja Turtles' first season originally aired between February 8, 2003 and November 1, 2003, beginning with the "Things Change" episode. The episodes were released in two separate volumes, the first on May 22, 2007 with twelve episodes, and the second on September 18, 2007 with fourteen episodes.

No.	Title	Directed by	Written by	Original release date	TV broadcast
1	"Things Change"	Chuck Patton	Michael Ryan	February 8, 2003	S01E01
2	"A Better Mousetrap"	Chuck Patton	Marty Isenberg	February 15, 2003	S01E02
3	"Attack of the Mousers"	Chuck Patton	Eric Luke	February 22, 2003	S01E03
4	"Meet Casey Jones"	Chuck Patton	Michael Ryan	March 1, 2003	S01E04
5	"Nano"	Chuck Patton	Eric Luke	March 8, 2003	S01E05
6	"Darkness on the Edge of Town"	Chuck Patton	Marty Isenberg	March 15, 2003	S01E06
7	"The Way of Invisibility"	Chuck Patton	Marty Isenberg	March 22, 2003	S01E07
8	"Fallen Angel"	Chuck Patton	Marty Isenberg	March 29, 2003	S01E08
9	"Garbageman"	Chuck Patton	Eric Luke	April 5, 2003	S01E09
10	"The Shredder Strikes"	Chuck Patton	Michael Ryan	April 12, 2003	S01E10
11	"The Shredder Strikes"	Chuck Patton	Michael Ryan	April 19, 2003	S01E11
12	"The Unconvincing Turtle Titan"	Chuck Patton	Marty Isenberg	May 3, 2003	S01E12
13	"Notes from the Underground"	Chuck Patton	Eric Luke	May 10, 2003	S01E13
14	"Notes from the Underground"	Chuck Patton	Greg Johnson	May 17, 2003	S01E14
15	"Notes from the Underground"	Chuck Patton	Greg Johnson	May 24, 2003	So1E15
16	"The King"	Chuck Patton	Michael Ryan	May 31, 2003	S01E16
17	"The Shredder Strikes Back"	Chuck Patton	Eric Luke	June 7, 2003	S01E17
18	"The Shredder Strikes Back"	Chuck Patton	Eric Luke	June 14, 2003	S01E18
19	"Tales of Leo"	Chuck Patton	Marty Isenberg	September 13, 2003	S01E19
20	"The Monster Hunter"	Chuck Patton	Michael Ryan	September 20, 2003	S01E20
21	"Return to New York"	Chuck Patton	Marty Isenberg & Michael Ryan	September 27, 2003	S01E21
22	"Return to New York"	Chuck Patton	Marty Isenberg & Michael Ryan	October 4, 2003	S01E22
23	"Return to New York"	Chuck Patton	Michael Ryan	October 11, 2003	S01E23
24	"Lone Raph and Cub"	Chuck Patton	Eric Luke	October 18, 2003	S01E24
25	"The Search for Splinter"	Chuck Patton	Greg Johnson	October 25, 2003	S01E25
26	"The Search for Splinter"	Chuck Patton	Greg Johnson	November 1, 2003	S01E26

=== Season 2 (2003–04) ===
The Shredder returns in season 2 and is revealed to be an Utrom named Ch'rell. Karai, the daughter of the Shredder makes her first appearance in this season.

No. overall	No. in season	Title	Directed by	Written by	Original release date	Prod. code
27	1	"Turtles in Space"	Chuck Patton	Michael Ryan	November 8, 2003	S02E01
28	2	"Turtles in Space"	Chuck Patton	Eric Luke	November 15, 2003	S02E02
29	3	"Turtles in Space"	Chuck Patton	Marty Eisenberg	November 22, 2003	S02E03
30	4	"Turtles in Space"	Chuck Patton	Michael Ryan	November 29, 2003	S02E04
31	5	"Turtles in Space"	Chuck Patton	Marty Eisenberg	December 6, 2003	S02E05
32	6	"Secret Origins"	Chuck Patton	Eric Luke	January 17, 2004	S02E06
33	7	"Secret Origins"	Chuck Patton	Michael Ryan	January 24, 2004	S02E07
34	8	"Secret Origins"	Chuck Patton	Marty Isenberg	January 31, 2004	S02E08
35	9	"Reflections"	Chuck Patton	Roland Gonzalez	February 14, 2004	S02E09
36	10	"The Ultimate Ninja"	Chuck Patton	Michael Ryan	February 7, 2004	S02E10
37	11	"The Return of Nano"	Chuck Patton	Eric Luke	February 21, 2004	S02E11
38	12	"What a Croc!"	Chuck Patton	Ben Townsend	February 28, 2004	S02E12
39	13	"Return to the Underground"	Chuck Patton	Marty Isenberg	March 6, 2004	S02E13
40	14	"City at War"	Chuck Patton	Eric Luke	March 13, 2004	S02E14
41	15	"City at War"	Chuck Patton	Marty Isenberg	March 20, 2004	S02E15
42	16	"City at War"	Chuck Patton	Ben Townsend	March 27, 2004	S02E16
43	17	"Junklantis"	Chuck Patton	Eric Luke	April 3, 2004	S02E17
44	18	"The Golden Puck"	Chuck Patton	Michael Ryan	April 10, 2004	S02E18
45	19	"Rogue in the House"	Chuck Patton	Eric Luke	April 17, 2004	S02E19
46	20	"Rogue in the House"	Chuck Patton	Ben Townsend	April 24, 2004	S02E20
47	21	"April's Artifact"	Chuck Patton	Marty Isenberg	May 1, 2004	S02E21
48	22	"Return of the Justice Force"	Chuck Patton	Marty Isenberg	May 8, 2004	S02E22
49	23	"The Big Brawl"	Chuck Patton	Michael Ryan	May 15, 2004	S02E23
50	24	"The Big Brawl"	Chuck Patton	Ben Townsend	September 18, 2004	S02E24
51	25	"The Big Brawl"	Chuck Patton	Marty Isenberg	September 25, 2004	S02E25
52	26	"The Big Brawl"	Chuck Patton	Michael Ryan	October 2, 2004	S02E26

=== Season 3 (2004–05) ===
Many of the Ninja Turtles' enemies return in season 3. This is the final season that includes Utrom Shredder.

No. overall	No. in season	Title	Directed by	Written by	Original release date	Prod. code
53	1	"Space Invaders"	Roy Burdine	Dean Stefan	October 9, 2004	S03E02
54	2	"Space Invaders"	Roy Burdine	Eric Luke	October 16, 2004	S03E03
55	3	"Space Invaders"	Roy Burdine	Marty Isenberg	October 23, 2004	S03E04
56	4	"Worlds Collide"	Roy Burdine	Ben Townsend	October 30, 2004	S03E05
57	5	"Worlds Collide"	Roy Burdine	Marty Isenberg	November 6, 2004	S03E06
58	6	"Worlds Collide"	Roy Burdine	Eric Luke	November 13, 2004	S03E07
59	7	"Touch and Go"	Roy Burdine	Michael Ryan	November 20, 2004	S03E08
60	8	"Hunted"	Roy Burdine	Ben Townsend	November 27, 2004	S03E09
61	9	"H.A.T.E."	Roy Burdine	Marty Isenberg	December 4, 2004	S03E10
62	10	"Nobody's Fool"	Roy Burdine	Greg Johnson	December 11, 2004	S03E11
63	11	"The Lesson"	Roy Burdine	Michael Ryan	December 18, 2004	S03E13
64	12	"The Christmas Aliens"	Roy Burdine	Michael Ryan	December 25, 2004	S03E01
65	13	"New Blood"	Roy Burdine	Marty Isenberg	January 22, 2005	S03E12
66	14	"The Darkness Within"	Roy Burdine	Ben Townsend	January 29, 2005	S03E14
67	15	"Mission of Gravity"	Roy Burdine	Marty Isenberg	February 5, 2005	S03E15
68	16	"The Entity Below"	Roy Burdine	Greg Johnson	February 12, 2005	S03E16
69	17	"Time Travails"	Roy Burdine	Bob Forward	February 19, 2005	S03E17
70	18	"Hun on the Run"	Roy Burdine	Michael Ryan	February 26, 2005	S03E18
71	19	"Reality Check"	Roy Burdine	Christopher Yost	March 5, 2005	S03E19
72	20	"Across the Universe"	Roy Burdine	Greg Johnson	March 12, 2005	S03E20
73	21	"Same As It Never Was"	Roy Burdine	Michael Ryan	March 19, 2005	S03E21
74	22	"The Real World"	Roy Burdine	Christopher Yost	March 26, 2005	S03E22
75	23	"The Real World"	Roy Burdine	Michael Ryan	April 2, 2005	S03E23
76	24	"Bishop's Gambit"	Roy Burdine	Greg Johnson	April 9, 2005	S03E24
77	25	"Exodus"	Roy Burdine	Christopher Yost	April 16, 2005	S03E25
78	26	"Exodus"	Roy Burdine	Greg Johnson	April 23, 2005	S03E26

=== Season 4 (2005–06) ===
For the entire season Karai is the leader of the Foot Clan. Hun controls the Purple Dragons. New enemies are seen in this season.

No. overall	No. in season	Title	Directed by	Written by	Original release date	Prod. code
79	1	"Cousin Sid"	Roy Burdine	Christopher Yost	September 10, 2005	S04E01
80	2	"The People's Choice"	Roy Burdine	Baz Hawkins	September 17, 2005	S04E02
81	3	"A Wing and a Prayer"	Roy Burdine	Baz Hawkins	September 24, 2005	S04E03
82	4	"Sons of the Silent Age"	Roy Burdine	Steve Murphy	October 1, 2005	S04E04
83	5	"Dragon's Brew"	Roy Burdine	Michael Ryan	October 8, 2005	S04E05
84	6	"I, Monster"	Roy Burdine	Brandon Sawyer	October 15, 2005	S04E06
85	7	"Grudge Match"	Roy Burdine	Christopher Yost	October 22, 2005	S04E07
86	8	"All Hallows Thieves"	Roy Burdine	Gavin Hignight	October 29, 2005	S04E08
87	9	"Bad Day"	Roy Burdine	Brandon Sawyer	November 5, 2005	S04E09
88	10	"Aliens Among Us"	Roy Burdine	Christopher Yost	November 12, 2005	S04E10
89	11	"Dragons Rising"	Roy Burdine	Michael Ryan	November 19, 2005	S04E11
90	12	"Still Nobody"	Roy Burdine	Baz Hawkins	November 26, 2005	S04E12
91	13	"Samurai Tourist"	Roy Burdine	Christopher Yost	December 3, 2005	S04E13
92	14	"The Ancient One"	Roy Burdine	Steve Murphy	December 10, 2005	S04E14
93	15	"Scion of the Shredder"	Roy Burdine	Eugene Son	January 28, 2006	S04E15
94	16	"Prodigal Son"	Roy Burdine	Gavin Hignight	February 4, 2006	S04E16
95	17	"Outbreak"	Roy Burdine	Christopher Yost	February 11, 2006	S04E17
96	18	"Trouble with Augie"	Roy Burdine	Eugene Son	February 18, 2006	S04E18
97	19	"Insane in the Membrane"	Roy Burdine	Matthew Drdek	February 25, 2006	S04E19
98	20	"Tale of Master Yoshi"	Roy Burdine	Steve Murphy	March 4, 2006	S04E20
99	21	"Return of Savanti"	Roy Burdine	Christopher Yost	March 11, 2006	S04E21
100	22	"Return of Savanti"	Roy Burdine	Christopher Yost	March 18, 2006	S04E22
101	23	"Adventures in Turtle Sitting"	Roy Burdine	Roland Gonzalez	March 25, 2006	S04E23
102	24	"Good Genes"	Roy Burdine	Christopher Yost	April 1, 2006	S04E24
103	25	"Good Genes"	Roy Burdine	Christopher Yost	April 8, 2006	S04E25
104	26	"Ninja Tribunal"	Roy Burdine	Michael Ryan	April 15, 2006	S04E26

=== Season 5: Ninja Tribunal (2006–08) ===
To try and increase interest in the series, Fox aired the "Fast Forward" season on commercial TV in 2006. 4Kids Entertainment later signed a deal with Comcast and the season began airing on Comcast-On-Demand on August 7, 2006; however, after airing five episodes, the airings were canceled. Fox later aired the "Membership Drive" episode on March 24, 2007, which was the first episode of the season to air on regular television. 4Kids TV started showing "The Ninja Tribunal" and the 12 completed episodes of this season weekly beginning on February 16, 2008. The season was promoted as the "Lost Episodes."

No. overall	No. in season	Title	Directed by	Written by	Original release date	Prod. code	K6–11 rating/share
105	1	"Lap of the Gods"	Roy Burdine	Christopher Yost	August 7, 2006 (Comcast-On-Demand)	105	N/A
106	2	"Demons and Dragons"	Roy Burdine	Joe Kelly	August 7, 2006 (Comcast-On-Demand)	106	N/A
107	3	"Legend of the 5 Dragons"	Roy Burdine	Danny Fingeroth	August 7, 2006 (Comcast-On-Demand)	107	N/A
108	4	"More Worlds Than One"	Roy Burdine	Christopher Yost	August 7, 2006 (Comcast-On-Demand)	108	N/A
109	5	"Beginning of the End"	Roy Burdine	Joe Kelly	September 20, 2006 (Comcast-On-Demand)	109	N/A
-	-	"Nightmares Recycled"	Roy Burdine	Roland Gonzalez	Unaired	110	N/A
110	6	"Membership Drive"	Roy Burdine	Christopher Yost	March 24, 2007	111	1.3/6
111	7	"New World Order"	Roy Burdine	Danny Fingeroth	March 29, 2008	112	1.3/5
112	8	"New World Order"	Roy Burdine	Matthew Drdek	April 5, 2008	113	1.7/7
113	9	"Fathers and Sons"	Roy Burdine	Roland Gonzalez	April 12, 2008	114	1.3/5
114	10	"Past and Present"	Roy Burdine	Joe Kelly	April 19, 2008	115	1.1/5
115	11	"Enter the Dragons"	Roy Burdine	Christopher Yost	April 26, 2008	116	1.1/5
116	12	"Enter the Dragons"	Roy Burdine	Christopher Yost	May 2, 2008	117	1.2/5

=== Season 6: Fast Forward (2006–07) ===
The sixth season, subtitled Fast Forward, originally aired between July 29, 2006 and October 27, 2007, beginning with the episode "Future Shellshock." It includes new designs for all returning characters.

No. overall	No. in season	Title	Directed by	Written by	Original release date	Prod. code	K6–11 rating/share
117	1	"Future Shellshock"	Roy Burdine	Marty Isenberg	July 29, 2006	118	0.7/4
118	2	"Obsolete"	Roy Burdine	Adam Beechen	August 5, 2006	119	N/A
119	3	"Home Invasion"	Roy Burdine	Rich Fogel	August 12, 2006	120	N/A
120	4	"Headlock Prime"	Roy Burdine	Steven Melching	September 30, 2006	121	1.1/5
121	5	"Playtime's Over"	Roy Burdine	Julia Lewald	October 7, 2006	122	0.8/4
122	6	"Bishop to Knight"	Roy Burdine	Steve Murphy	October 14, 2006	123	1.3/7
123	7	"Night of Sh'Okanabo"	Roy Burdine	Michael Ryan	October 21, 2006	124	0.8/4
124	8	"Clash of the Turtle Titans"	Roy Burdine	Marty Isenberg	October 28, 2006	125	0.8/3
125	9	"Fly Me to the Moon"	Roy Burdine	Rich Fogel	November 4, 2006	126	1.0/4
126	10	"Invasion of the Body Snatcher!" (Note: Formerly called "Invasion of the Bodyjacker".)	Roy Burdine	Roger Slifer	November 11, 2006	127	1.2/5
127	11	"The Freaks Come Out at Night" (Note: Formerly called "The Freaks Come Out at Night...")	Roy Burdine	Marty Isenberg	November 25, 2006	128	1.2/5
128	12	"Bad Blood"	Roy Burdine	Roland Gonzalez	December 2, 2006	129	0.9/4
129	13	"The Journal"	Roy Burdine	Steve Murphy	December 9, 2006	130	1.2/4
130	14	"The Gaminator"	Roy Burdine	Wendell Morris	December 16, 2006	131	1.4/6
131	15	"Graduation Day: Class of 2105" (Note: Formerly called "Graduation Day".)	Roy Burdine	Julia Lewald	March 24, 2007	132	1.3/6
132	16	"Timing Is Everything"	Roy Burdine	Joe Kelly	March 31, 2007	133	1.3/5
133	17	"Enter the Jammerhead"	Roy Burdine	Julia Lewald	April 7, 2007	134	1.4/6
134	18	"Milk Run" (Note: Formerly called "The Milk Run".)	Roy Burdine	Steven Melching	April 14, 2007	135	1.3/5
135	19	"The Fall of Darius Dunn" (Note: Formerly called "The Fall of Darius Dun".)	Roy Burdine	Rich Fogel	April 21, 2007	136	1.5/6
136	20	"Turtle X-Tinction"	Roy Burdine	Marty Isenberg	April 28, 2007	137	1.2/5
137	21	"Race For Glory" (Note: Formerly called "Race for Glory!")	Roy Burdine	Larry Hama	September 8, 2007	138	1.4/6
138	22	"Head of State"	Roy Burdine	John Drdek	September 15, 2007	139	1.2/5
139	23	"DNA is Thicker than Water"	Roy Burdine	Roland Gonzalez	October 6, 2007	140	1.2/5
140	24	"The Cosmic Completist"	Roy Burdine	James Felder	October 13, 2007	141	1.6/6
141	25	"The Day of Awakening"	Roy Burdine	Steve Murphy	October 20, 2007	142	1.5/7
142	26	"Zixxth Sense"	Roy Burdine	Rich Fogel	October 27, 2007	143	N/A

=== Season 7: Back to the Sewer (2008–09) ===
For most of the final season of the series, subtitled Back to the Sewer, the Shredder of the virtual world of Cyberspace is the main villain, and Master Splinter is trapped deep within virtual limbo with a desperate Donatello resolved to restore his real world form.

No. overall	No. in season	Title	Directed by	Written by	Original release date	Prod. code	K6–11 rating/share
143	1	"Tempus Fugit"	Roy Burdine	Eric Basart	September 13, 2008	144	1.1/4
144	2	"Karate Schooled"	Roy Burdine	Michael Ryan	September 20, 2008	145	1.1/5
145	3	"Something Wicked"	Roy Burdine	Michael Ryan	September 27, 2008	146	N/A
146	4	"The Engagement Ring"	Roy Burdine	Robert David	October 4, 2008	147	N/A
147	5	"Hacking Stockman"	Roy Burdine	Joe Kelly	October 18, 2008	148	1.2/5
148	6	"Incredible Shrinking Serling"	Roy Burdine	Robert David	October 25, 2008	149	1.4/6
149	7	"Identity Crisis"	Roy Burdine	Michael Ryan	November 1, 2008	150	0.9/4
150	8	"Web Wranglers"	Roy Burdine	Robert David	November 8, 2008	151	1.2/5
151	9	"SuperQuest"	Roy Burdine	Robert David	November 15, 2008	152	1.0/4
152	10	"Virtual Reality Check"	Roy Burdine	Michael Ryan	November 22, 2008	153	1.1/5
153	11	"City Under Siege"	Roy Burdine	Steve Melching	November 29, 2008	154	N/A
154	12	"Super Power Struggle"	Roy Burdine	Robert David	February 21, 2009	155	1.2/4
155	13	"Wedding Bells and Bytes"	Roy Burdine	Matthew Drek & Robert David	February 28, 2009	156	1.3/5

=== Television film ===
A TV movie based on the series was produced by 4Kids Entertainment. It premiered November 21, 2009 on The CW4Kids.

Title	Written by	Directed by	Original air date	K6–11 rating/share
"Turtles Forever"	Rob David, Matthew Drdek, and Lloyd Goldfine	Roy Burdine and Lloyd Goldfine	November 21, 2009	1.5/6
When the turtles of the 1987 animated series are accidentally brought to the world of the 2003 series, the old turtles must ally with the new to stop Ch'rell, the 2003 Utrom Shredder, whose evil plan of revenge for his exile threatens the existence of the very omniverse itself of the Teenage Mutant Ninja Turtles everywhere. Fortunately, he is double-crossed by his own adopted daughter, Karai, who aids the turtles.

== See also ==
- Teenage Mutant Ninja Turtles (2003 TV series)
- List of Teenage Mutant Ninja Turtles characters
