= Rich Fogel =

American screenwriter

Rich Fogel is an American Emmy Award-winning animation writer. He has worked on series such as The Smurfs, Batman Beyond, Justice League, and Pinky and the Brain.

== Screenwriting credits ==
- series head writer denoted in bold

=== Television ===
- Super Friends: The Legendary Super Powers Show (1984–1985)
- The 13 Ghosts of Scooby-Doo (1985)
- The Smurfs (1986)
- Muppet Babies (1987–1988)
- **RoboCop** (1988)
- The New Adventures of Winnie the Pooh (1989)
- Disney's Adventures of the Gummi Bears (1989)
- DuckTales (1990)
- Goof Troop (1992)
- Dog City (1993)
- **Wild West C.O.W.-Boys of Moo Mesa** (1993): season 2 head writer
- Captain Planet and the Planeteers (1993, 1996)
- Creepy Crawlers (1994)
- WildC.A.T.s (1994)
- Taz-Mania (1995)
- Pinky and the Brain (1996)
- **Superman: The Animated Series** (1996–2000)
- **The New Batman Adventures** (1997–1999)
- **Batman Beyond** (1999-2001)
- **The Zeta Project** (2001–2002)
- **Justice League** (2001–2002)
- **Firehouse Tales** (2005–2006)
- Krypto the Superdog (2006)
- Super Robot Monkey Team Hyperforce Go! (2006)
- Teenage Mutant Ninja Turtles (2006)
- Transformers: Animated (2008-09)
- Yin Yang Yo! (2008)
- Ben 10: Alien Force (2010)
- G.I. Joe: Renegades (2010)
- Ultimate Spider-Man (2012)
- Pound Puppies (2012)
- The Octonauts (2012–2017)
- Kaijudo (2013)
- Max Steel (2013–2014)
- Thunderbirds Are Go (2016)
- Shimmer and Shine (2017)
- Guardians of the Galaxy (2017–2018)
- Young Justice (2019)

=== Films ===
- Star Fairies (1985)
- I Yabba-Dabba Do! (1993)
- Hollyrock-a-Bye Baby (1993)
- Max Steel: Team Turbo (2016)
