= Turtles Forever =

2009 animated superhero television film

- Promotional release poster
- Genre: Superhero
- Based on: Characters created by Peter Laird and Kevin Eastman
- Written by: Rob David; Matthew Drdek; Lloyd Goldfine
- Directed by: Roy Burdine; Lloyd Goldfine
- Voices of: Michael Sinterniklaas; Wayne Grayson; Sam Riegel; Frank Frankson; Darren Dunstan; Scottie Ray; Dan Green; Sebastian Arcelus; Russell Velázquez (Note: credited as Johnny Castro); Tony Salerno; Load Williams; Bradford Scobie (Note: credited as Bradford Cameron)
- Composers: Elik Alvarez; John Angier; Lou Cortelezzi; Matt McGuire; Pete Scaturro; Freddy Sheinfeld; John Van Tongeren; Rusty Andrews; Mark Breeding; Joel Douek; John Petersen; Ralph Schuckett; John Siegler; Russell Velázquez
- Country of origin: United States
- Original language: English

Production
- Executive producers: Gary Richardson; Frederick U. Fierst; Alfred R. Kahn; Norman J. Grossfeld
- Producer: Sarah C. Nesbitt
- Editor: Richard Kronenberg
- Running time: 81 minutes (Uncut/PAL DVD); 73 minutes (TV edit/NTSC DVD)
- Production companies: Mirage Studios; 4Kids Entertainment

Original release
- Network: The CW4Kids
- Release: November 21, 2009

Turtles Forever is a 2009 American animated superhero television film based on the Teenage Mutant Ninja Turtles franchise. A crossover between the 1987 and 2003 television series, the latter of which it serves as the series finale to, Turtles Forever follows the two sets of Turtles as they save the multiverse from the wrath of Ch'Rell, the Utrom Shredder from the 2003 television series. Directed by Roy Burdine and Lloyd Goldfine and written by Goldfine, Rob David, and Matthew Drdek, it was produced in celebration of the 25th anniversary of the franchise. Turtles Forever premiered on The CW4Kids in the United States on November 21, 2009. The film received generally positive reviews from fans and critics.

== Plot ==
The Teenage Mutant Ninja Turtles watch a video broadcast of warriors who look like them fighting the Purple Dragons on TV. The Turtles break into the Purple Dragons' HQ and discover that their "imposters" are actually alternate versions of themselves; the teams escape together.

The 1987 Turtles reveal they arrived after fighting their Shredder and Krang over mutagen in the Technodrome. During the battle, the dimensional teleporter malfunctioned, sending them all to the 2003 dimension. Checking recent tremor reports, the Turtles find the Technodrome, only to have to battle an army of Foot Soldiers led by Bebop and Rocksteady.

1987 Shredder sees the two Turtle teams and theorizes that another Shredder might exist in this dimension. He and Krang discover Ch'rell, the Utrom Shredder, on an icy asteroid where he was banished, and beam him to the Technodrome. They revive him, but find him too insane for an alliance and try to vivisect him. However, Ch'rell's adopted daughter Karai, who had been monitoring his exile, breaks into the Technodrome and frees him, declaring the weapon's technology property of the Foot Clan.

While tracking the Technodrome, the Turtles and their master Splinter are attacked by Hun and the Purple Dragons, who want their mutagen. During the fight, Hun is accidentally exposed to it and turns into a mutant turtle. He wanders until coming upon the Technodrome, now under the control of Ch'rell, who takes Hun back into his service.

Ch'rell and Karai begin rebuilding the Technodrome with help from the Cyber Foot, using Utrom science to revise it, with the combined technology used to make Ch'rell's new Shredder body, and create new Foot-Bots. Analyzing the mutagen that affected Hun, they reverse-engineer it to transform the Cyber Foot into Mutant Foot Soldiers. Using the trans-dimensional portal, Ch'rell learns that there are many parallel universes filled with Ninja Turtles. Hun, Bebop, and Rocksteady are dispatched alongside an army of Utrom Foot-Bots to capture the Turtles by breaking into their lair. The lair begins crumbling, forcing the Turtles to use their dimensional portal projector to escape into the 1987 dimension while Splinter is captured by Hun.

While the Turtles are preparing for their fight, they discover that Shredder has started attacking the 2003 dimension with the upgraded Technodrome and the Mutant Foot Soldiers. Casey Jones and April O'Neil try to hold the enemy off before the Turtle teams arrive. After entering the Technodrome to find Splinter, they are captured by Ch'rell, who plans to wipe out every version of the Ninja Turtles across the multiverse by destroying them in their source dimension, "Turtle Prime". By scanning the eight turtles' DNA, he finds the dimension, but before the Turtles are wiped out, they are suddenly warped out of the Technodrome, secretly by Karai, who has started to question Ch'rell's goals. The Turtles reunite with April and Casey, but realize that Ch'rell has started his plans and their dimension slowly is erased.

After a fight with the Dragons and Hun which results in their, along with April and Casey's, erasure, the Turtles escape to Turtle Prime, where they encounter their prime counterparts. The twelve Turtles team up and are joined by Splinter, Karai, 1987 Shredder, and Krang against Ch'rell. Karai attempts to convince Ch'rell that wiping out Turtle Prime would also result in their own erasure, but Ch'rell is too blinded by his hatred of the Turtles to care. During the battle, Ch'rell's exo-suit grows giant, but proves to be vulnerable to the Technodrome's laser beam. He seizes the Prime Turtles and attempts to destroy them and the entire multiverse, but the 1987 Turtles break his balance and save the Prime Turtles. Bebop unknowingly reactivates the Technodrome's laser beam, which vaporizes Ch'rell. With their foe defeated and their worlds restored, the two turtle teams and their allies return to their respective worlds, while the Prime Turtles decide to go get some pizza.

In the real world, Peter Laird and Kevin Eastman put the finishing touches on the first issue of Teenage Mutant Ninja Turtles, hopeful that the book will sell. They then go out for pizza.

== Voice cast ==
- Michael Sinterniklaas as Leonardo, the leader of the 2003 Turtles.
- Sam Riegel as Donatello, the 2003 Turtles' genius engineer who is identified as the member who holds the team together.
- Greg Abbey as Raphael, 2003 Leo's second-in-command who is stubborn but caring.
- Wayne Grayson as Michelangelo, the 2003 Turtles' youngest member and a source of comic relief.
- Darren Dunstan as Splinter, the 2003 Turtles' sensei and adopted father.
- Anthony Haden Salerno as 1987 Donatello, an alternate version of Donnie from the 1987 cartoon universe.
- Sebastian Arcelus as 1987 Raphael, an alternate version of Raph from the 1987 cartoon universe.
- Russell Velázquez as:
  - 1987 Michelangelo, an alternate version of Mikey from the 1987 cartoon universe.
  - Rocksteady, a mutant black rhinoceros employed as a minion for 1987 Shredder.
- Dan Green as 1987 Leonardo, an alternate version of Leo from the 1987 cartoon universe.
- Karen Neill as Karai, Utrom Shredder's adoptive daughter and the 2003 Foot Clan's second-in-command.
- Greg Carey as Hun, a former ally of the Utrom Shredder and leader of the Purple Dragons, who is transformed into a ferocious mutant turtle before rejoining the 2003 Foot Clan.
- Veronica Taylor as April O'Neil, an ally of the 2003 Turtles and Casey's wife.
- Marc Thompson as Casey Jones, a vigilante ally of the 2003 Turtles and 2003 April's husband.
- Load Williams as Oroku Saki / 1987 Shredder, an alternate version of Shredder from the 1987 cartoon universe.
- Bradford Scobie as:
  - Krang, an alien ally of 1987 Shredder from Dimension X.
  - 1984 Michelangelo, an alternate version of Mikey from the 1984 Mirage comics universe.
  - Bebop, a mutant common warthog employed as a minion for 1987 Shredder and Rocksteady's partner, replacing Barry Gordon.
- Jason Griffith (Note: credited as Adam Caroleson) as 1984 Leonardo, an alternate version of Leo from the 1984 Mirage comics universe.
- Christopher C. Adams as 1984 Donatello, an alternate version of Donnie from the 1984 Mirage comics universe.
- Sean Schemmel voices 1984 Raphael, an alternate version of Raph from the 1984 Mirage comics universe.
- David Wills as:
  - 1984 Shredder, an alternate version of Shredder from the 1984 Mirage comics universe.
  - 1987 Splinter, an alternate version of Splinter from the 1987 cartoon universe.
- Rebecca Soler voices 1987 April, an alternate version of April from the 1987 cartoon universe.
- Scottie Ray as Ch'rell / the Utrom Shredder, the leader of the 2003 Foot Clan.

Peter Laird and Kevin Eastman make voiceover cameos as themselves.

Additional voices by Jason Griffith, Sean Schemmel, Bruce Falk, and Matthew Piazzi. (Note: credited as Matthew Piazza)

== Production ==
None of the original voice cast from the 1987 cartoon series reprised their roles and the original music from the show was not used in this special. In the actors' case, the original voice cast are members of SAG-AFTRA, which 4Kids did not have a contract with. For the score, most of the music from the 1987 series was owned at the time by that series' producer, Fred Wolf Films, and would require a license fee to be used in the show. For a cost-effective solution, the special used many of the productions' frequent talents and used their in-score team to make a soundtrack reminiscent of the original series.

== Release ==
Fathom Events originally planned a special event to commemorate the franchise's 25th anniversary to theatrically release Turtles Forever across the United States on October 29, 2009, with plans for an introduction "hosted" by the Leonardo, Raphael, Donatello and Michelangelo themselves, followed by a documentary by Peter Laird about how he and Kevin Eastman created the characters with rare original comic book art, archival pictures and all-new interviews. However, the inability by Fathom to reach an agreement with 4Kids Entertainment and Mirage Studios led to the event's cancellation.

An edited version of the movie was released on July 11, 2009, worldwide on TV. The film was then released on July 29 in New Zealand, Australia, and Canada. In other countries, the film aired on The CW as part of their Saturday morning The CW4Kids lineup on November 21.

The uncut version of the film later appeared on the CW4Kids's website on November 16, 2009, which includes 8 minutes of footage cut from the original version that aired on TV. The edited version was released on non-anamorphic widescreen DVD on August 24, 2010 in North America from Nickelodeon/Paramount Home Entertainment. This same edited version was included on Teenage Mutant Ninja Turtles (2003): The Ultimate Collection DVD released on July 25, 2023 in North America.

== Reception ==
Turtles Forever received mixed to positive reviews from fans and critics. In 2023, Larry Fried of /Film ranked the film 6th place (out of 11) in their Turtles films ranking list.Though he felt the plot and action set pieces were lacking, he felt the film was an overall solid experience because of its charm, novelty, and blend of art styles. In 2023, Josh Bell of Vulture ranked the film 5th place (out of 10) in their Turtles films ranking list. He praised the feature for its novelty and self-referential nature but felt that it was ultimately held back by its television budget. In 2023, Kyle Grammatica of Collider ranked the film 2nd place (out of 9) in their Turtles films ranking list. They praised it for being a celebration and love letter to Turtles, and felt that it was an overall well-rounded film.

In 2024, Rory Doherty of Paste ranked the film 5th place (out of 11) in their Turtles films ranking list. They compared it favorably to Spider-Man: No Way Home (2021) and wrote: "There's a sincerity and sweetness here that proves it's possible to do nostalgic fan-service without it feeling like a soulless corporate ghoul". Alan Ng of Film Threat gave the film 5/10, calling the film "incredibly dated" and the lack of connection felt towards the different sets of Turtles, with "the 1987 crew [...] a little more mature than their 2003 counterparts". The review from DVD Talk called Turtles Forever a "mostly forgettable endeavour" and said that the "cheap shots [against the 1987 Turtles] are pathetic and get old immediately".
