= Teenage Mutant Ninja Turtles (2003 TV series) =

Animated television series

- Also known as: Teenage Mutant Ninja Turtles: Ninja Tribunal (season 5); Teenage Mutant Ninja Turtles: Fast Forward (season 6); TMNT: Back to the Sewer (season 7)
- Genre: Martial arts; Action-adventure; Science fiction; Superhero
- Based on: Characters created by Kevin Eastman and Peter Laird
- Developed by: Lloyd Goldfine
- Directed by: Chuck Patton (seasons 1–2); Roy Burdine (seasons 3–7)
- Voices of: Michael Sinterniklaas; Wayne Grayson; Sam Riegel; Greg Abbey; Darren Dunstan; Scottie Ray; Marc Thompson; Veronica Taylor; Scott Williams; David Zen Mansley; Christopher C. Adams
- Theme music composer: Norman J. Grossfeld; Russell Velazquez
- Composers: Ralph Schuckett; Rusty Andrews; John Angier; Mark Breeding; Louis Cortelezzi; Joel Douek; John Petersen; Pete Scaturro; John Siegler; John Van Tongeren; Russel Velazquez
- Country of origin: United States
- Original language: English
- No. of seasons: 7
- No. of episodes: 155 (list of episodes)

Production
- Executive producers: Gary Richardson; Frederick U. Fierst; Alfred R. Kahn; Norman J. Grossfeld; Tom Kenney
- Producer: JoEllyn Marlow
- Running time: 21–23 minutes
- Production companies: Mirage Studios; 4Kids Entertainment

Original release
- Network: Fox (FoxBox/4Kids TV) (seasons 1–6); The CW (CW4Kids) (season 7)
- Release: February 8, 2003 – February 28, 2009

Related
- Teenage Mutant Ninja Turtles (1987–1996); Turtles Forever (2009); Teenage Mutant Ninja Turtles (2012–2017)

Teenage Mutant Ninja Turtles (Note: also known as Teenage Mutant Ninja Turtles: Ninja Tribunal, Teenage Mutant Ninja Turtles: Fast Forward, and TMNT: Back to the Sewer for the fifth, sixth, and seventh and final season) is an American animated television series developed by Lloyd Goldfine and based on the characters created by Kevin Eastman and Peter Laird. The series premiered on February 8, 2003, as part of Fox's FoxBox programming block (later known as 4Kids TV) and ended on February 28, 2009.

The series was announced on May 7, 2002. It was co-produced by 4Kids Entertainment (as its first in-house animated production) and franchise creators Mirage Studios, which co-owned rights to the show, with animation provided by the studio Dong Woo.

The series ran for 155 episodes over seven seasons. For its final season in 2008, the show moved from Fox to The CW. 4Kids also licensed the first 40 episodes to Cartoon Network in 2003, and Cartoon Network aired the series until 2007. A sequel film, Turtles Forever, serving as both the series finale of the series and a crossover with the 1987–1996 Teenage Mutant Ninja Turtles animated series (via the plot element of the multiverse), was released on November 21, 2009.

== Series overview ==
=== Seasons 1–4 ===
Compared to the predominantly comedic approach of the 1987 TV series (barring the last three seasons of the former), the 2003 series more closely matches the serious tone of the original comics, with a greater emphasis on action and themes of familial bonds. The series adapts a large scope of story arcs from the comics, with the Turtles' adventures combining elements of both fantasy and science fiction.

The first season starts with the Turtles' Lair being destroyed by Mousers, robots made by Baxter Stockman. On the hunt for a new place to live, the Turtles go topside and run into the Purple Dragons, who they later discover is led by Hun. The Turtles eventually get to the source of the Mousers and rescue April O'Neil, who after this becomes the Turtles' most trusted friend. Halfway through the season, Leonardo is approached by the Foot Clan leader Oroku Saki, later learned to be The Shredder, who funded Baxter's Mouser project and is Hun's master. The Shredder attacks the Turtles and burns down April's home, forcing them, April, and Casey Jones to flee the city. When the Turtles return to New York they confront the Shredder once more and Master Splinter goes missing, leading to the introduction of the Utroms, an alien race secretly living on Earth.

Season Two starts with the brothers being sent into space in the middle of a war between two alien races, the Triceraton Republic and the Federation. Upon returning to Earth, the Turtles learn from the Utroms the origins of the Shredder. This season also introduces Karai, Shredder's daughter and pupil, when she comes to take control of New York during a gang war. The season ends in a four-parter with the Turtles and Splinter taking part in the Battle Nexus tournament.

In Season Three, the Triceratons and Federation bring their war to Earth with the Turtles having to help end the war to save their planet. Agent John Bishop, leader of the Earth Protection Force, is introduced as an independent antagonist fighting both the Turtles and the Foot. The Turtles meet Renet, an apprentice timestress, which leads to them being scattered into different worlds/timelines. The Turtles and their allies then confront Shredder for a final battle when he attempts to leave Earth to wage war upon the cosmos.

Season Four sees the Turtles recovering from their final battle with Shredder, particularly Leonardo who has post-traumatic stress disorder. Karai takes leadership of the Foot, Hun leaves to reform the Purple Dragons into a powerful crime syndicate, and Bishop stages a faux alien invasion to secure funding for the EPF. However, lingering consequences from Bishop's engineered invasion caused an outbreak of mutations in New York.

=== Ninja Tribunal ===
Season Five introduces the Ninja Tribunal, a council of ninjitsu demigods who conscript the Turtles as acolytes to protect the world from the original Shredder, a dark evil coming back into being who threatens to set the world into darkness. During this season, the Turtles go through many trials and tribulations on their journey to become the best fighters they can be, eventually tapping into ancient energy to defeat the original Shredder. This would be the last to use the original character designs and animation style with its plot concluding the series' main storyline.

=== Fast Forward ===
The sixth season, subtitled "Fast Forward", would retool the series with a new art style and comedic tone. The season's plot focuses on the Turtles being transported about 100 years into the future to the year 2105; where they meet and befriend Cody Jones, the great-grandson of April and Casey. They must also contend with futurist enemies like Sh'Okanabo and his minion Viral as well as dealing with the activities of Cody's greedy and ambitious uncle Darius Dunn.

=== Back to the Sewer ===
The series would conclude in the seventh and final season, titled "TMNT: Back to the Sewer", while sporting another redesign for the entire cast based on the designs from the 2007 TMNT film. After returning to the present day, the Turtles must battle a cybernetic version of the Shredder which was the result of Viral merging with the data of the exiled Utrom Shredder. There is also a running subplot centered on the engagement and wedding of April and Casey.

=== Turtles Forever ===
The 2009 television film serves as the actual four-part finale to the 2003 series and centers around the Turtles encountering their 1987 animated counterparts, who have accidentally been transported to the 2003 Ninja Turtles' reality. To make matters worse, the 80's Shredder and Krang as well as their minions Bebop and Rocksteady free Ch'rell from his imprisonment as the redesigned Hun and Karai realign themselves with the released Ch'rell.

== Characters ==
Main cast

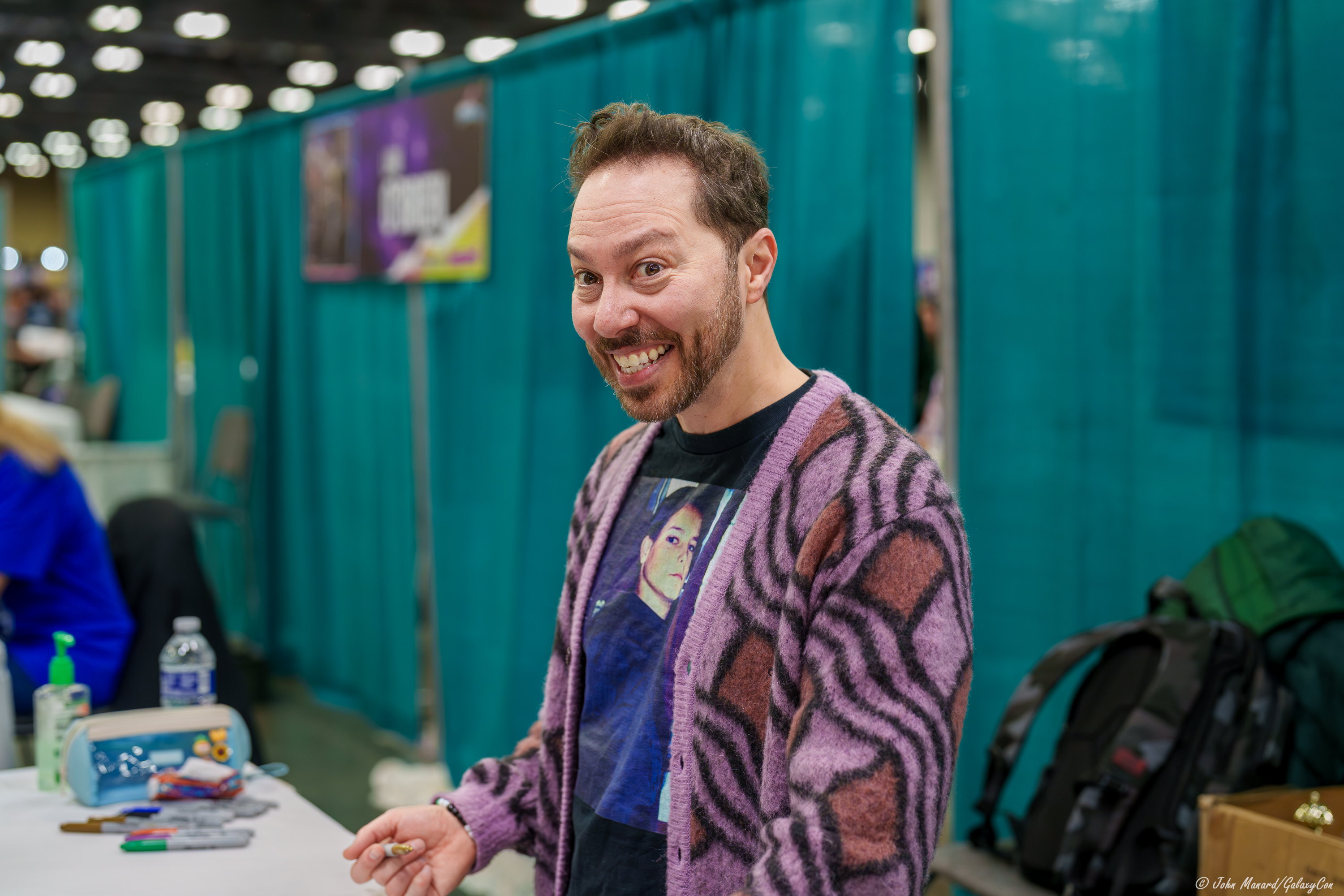
Sam Riegel

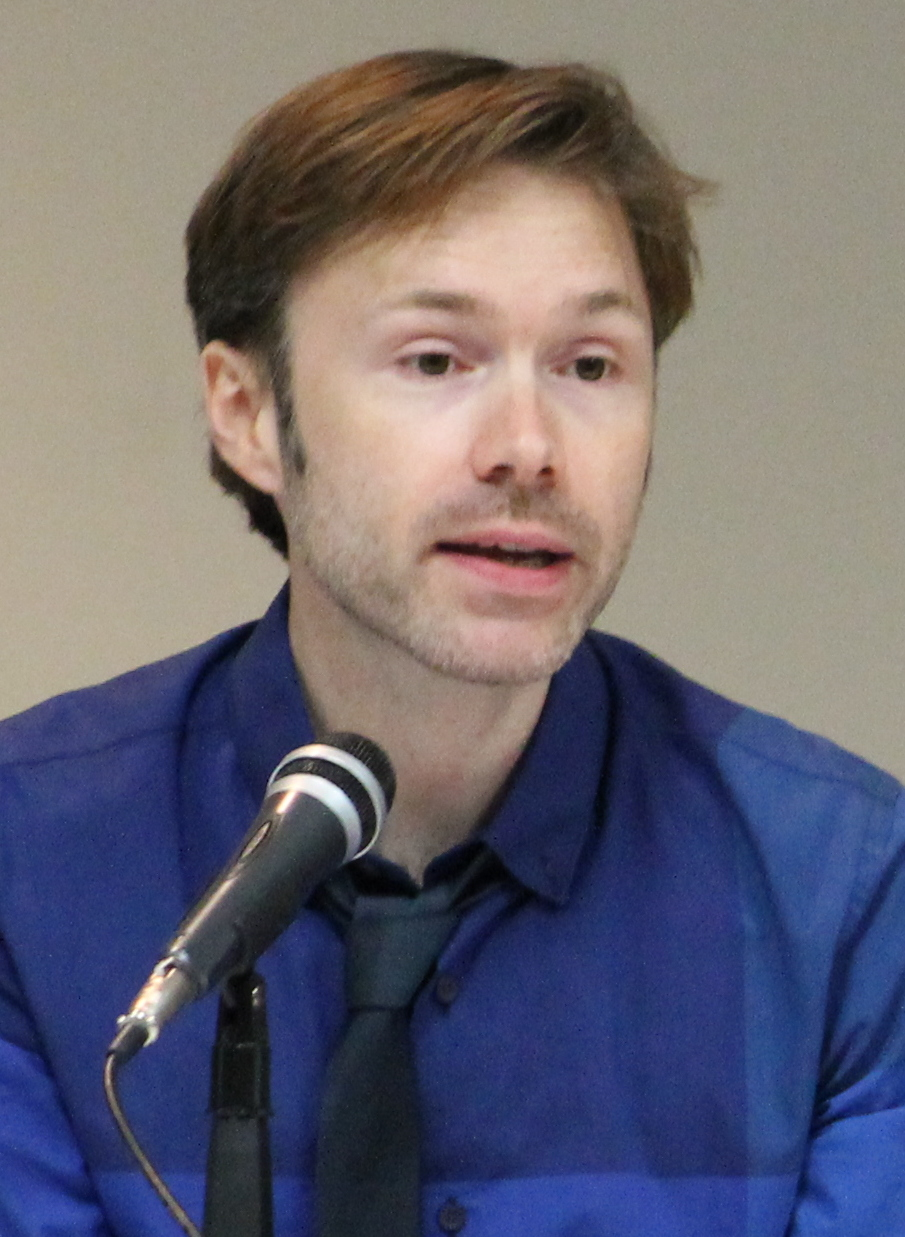
Michael Sinterniklaas

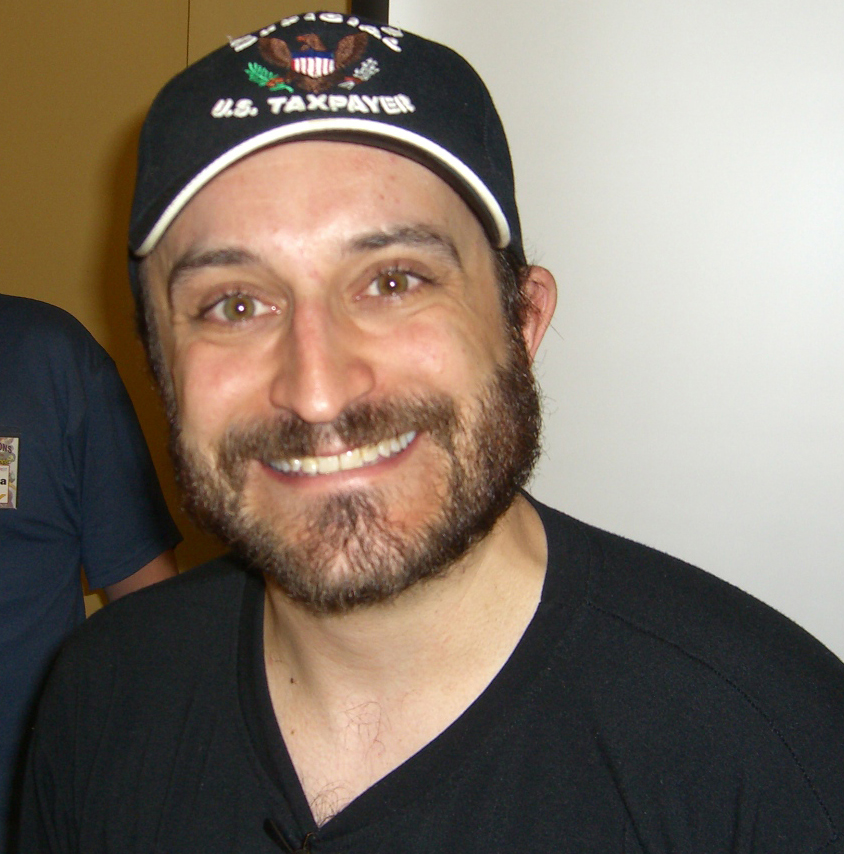
Wayne Grayson

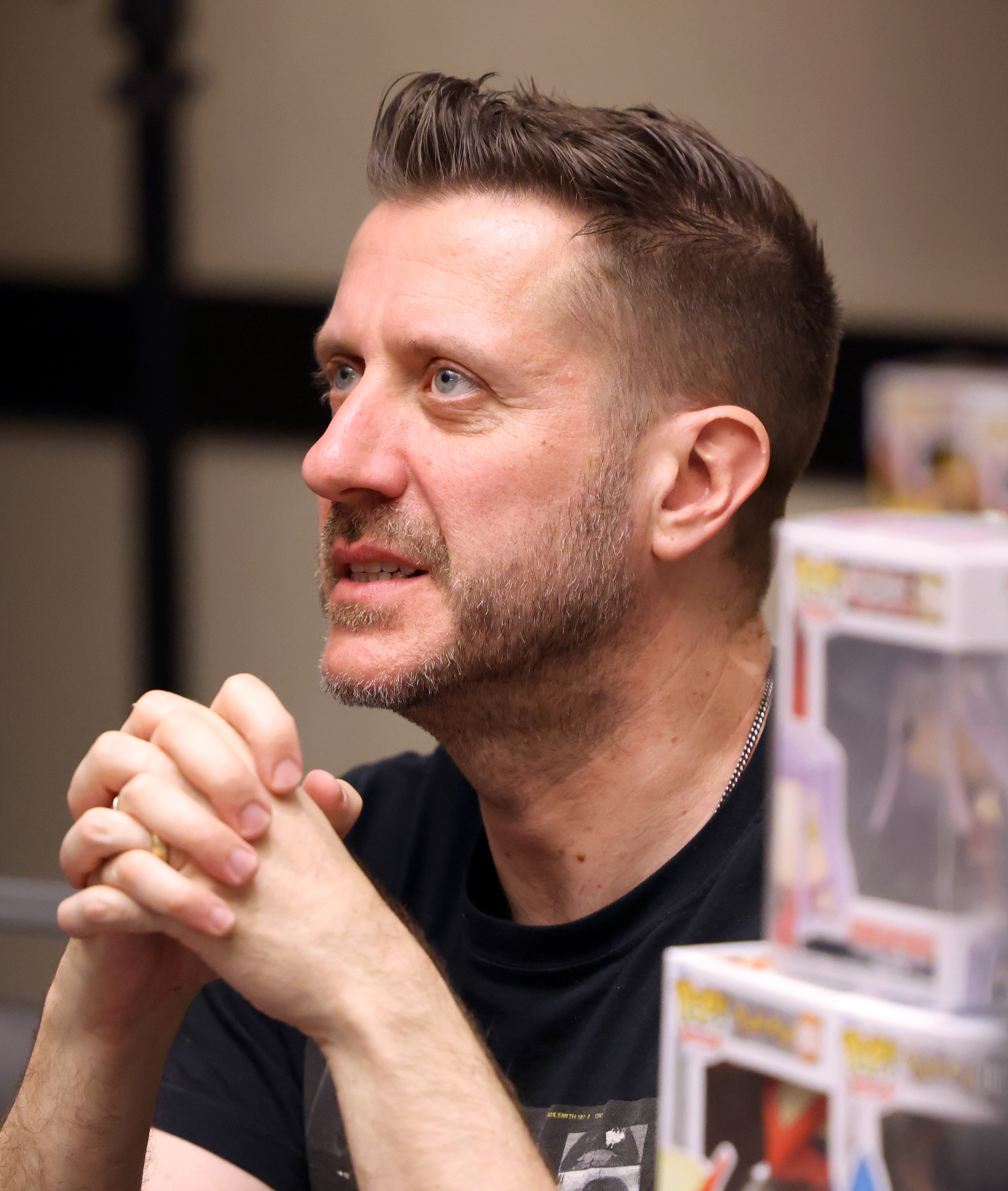
Darren Dunstan

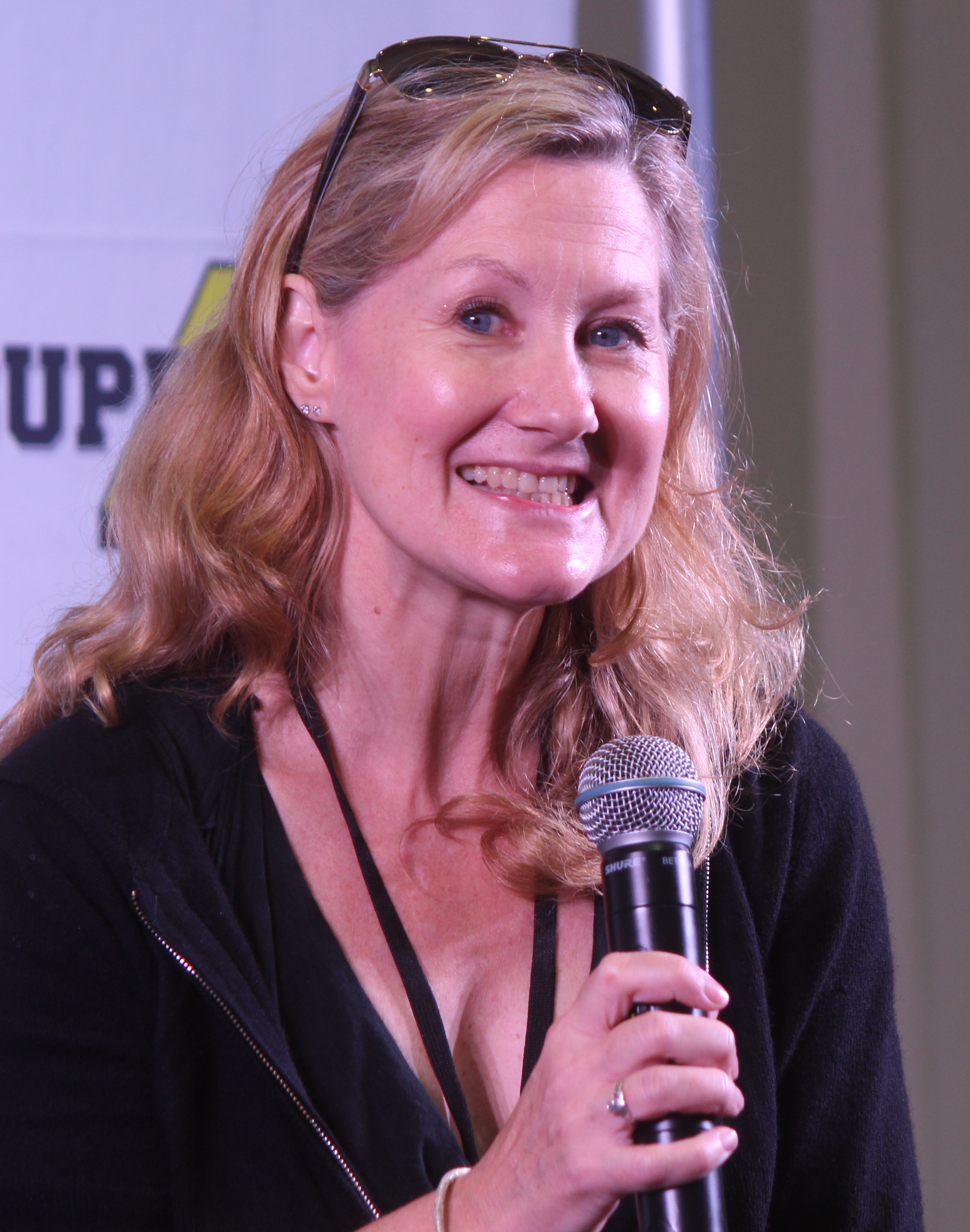
Veronica Taylor

=== Main ===
Leonardo fighting the Foot Clan's ninjas in the season 1 episode "Shredder Strikes Back: Part One".

- Donatello (voiced by Sam Riegel) is the most rational brother and the brains of the team who is in charge of creating their gadgets. He wields a bo staff as his weapon and wears a purple mask.
- Leonardo (voiced by Michael Sinterniklaas) is the most studious brother and the leader of the team who wields two Katana and wears a blue mask.
- Raphael (voiced by Greg Abbey) is the most hot-blooded brother and the muscle of the team. He wields two Sais as weapons and wears a red mask.
- Michelangelo (voiced by Wayne Grayson) is the wise guy and the jokester of the team. He loves comic books and sometimes disguises himself as the superhero Turtle Titan. His weapon of choice is Nunchucks and wears an orange mask.
- Splinter (voiced by Darren Dunstan) is the master and father of the Turtles who finds them prior to their mutation and trains them in Ninjutsu. Prior to his mutation, he was the pet of Hamato Yoshi and learned ninjutsu by mimicking his moves.

=== Allies ===
- April O'Neil (voiced by Veronica Taylor) is a human who used to be Dr. Stockman's assistant, but after learning his ulterior motives is saved by the Turtles and becomes their friend. She eventually marries Casey Jones in the series finale, and briefly appears in the TV movie Turtles Forever.
- Casey Jones (voiced by Marc Thompson) is a human whose father's shop was set on fire by the Purple Dragon before later killing him. Jones became a vigilante to fight them but has anger issues, but manages to tune it down after meeting and befriending the Turtles. Casey is a loyal friend to the Turtles, and is closest with Raphael out of the Turtles as they share a love of action and combat. He eventually marries April O'Neil in the series finale, and briefly appears in the TV movie Turtles Forever alongside April.
- Angel (voiced by Tara Sands) is teenage girl from Casey's neighborhood, who, together with her older brother Ryan, lives with her grandmother. Although Casey promised her grandmother that he would look out for her, he could often not spare the time for it. She eventually became captivated by the Purple Dragons around the neighborhood and followed them in hopes of joining their ranks, but Casey and the Turtles convinced her to give it up. Angel then asks the Turtle to help find her brother in an abandoned museum after being capture by a legion of undead warriors. In later episodes she is a good friend and ally to the turtles.
- Mortu (voiced by Dan Green) is a benevolent Utrom and an ally of the Turtles. He was the captain of the ship which was transporting the imprisoned Ch'rell on board and became stranded on Earth with his fellow Utroms when Ch'rell escaped and caused them to crash. He later met Hamato Yoshi and recruited him to become a guardian of the Utroms. He later saved the Turtles from their final battle with the Utrom Shredder and had him stand trial for his crimes.
- Leatherhead (voiced by F.B. Owens in season 2-3, Gary Lewis in season four to the "Back to the Sewer" season) is a mutated alligator who was taken in by the Utroms when they discovered that their mutagen (the same that transformed the Turtles) made him sentient. Leatherhead lived with the Utroms peacefully until Shredder's attack forced him into hiding. Some time later Baxter Stockman fooled him into aiding him with a scheme to restore his body. Ultimately, Leatherhead learned that Stockman had ties to the Shredder and wound up fighting on the side of good. As the series progresses he becomes a semi-regular member of the Turtles' extended family, aiding them in fighting such foes as the Foot and Agent Bishop.
- The Justice Force is a superhero group that is allied with the Turtles. The original members of the Justice Force was a spoof of the Justice Society of America while the second incarnation of the group is a spoof of the Justice League and the Avengers.
  - Stainless Steel Steve (voiced by David Wills impersonating Adam West) is a founding member of the original Justice Force. He has a metal saucer on his forehead that is capable of smashing through walls and withstanding any blows. In his alter ego of Stephen, he runs a comic book store in Northampton.
  - Joey Lastic (voiced by Oliver Wyman) is a founding member of the original Justice Force who has elastic powers. He is a parody of Plastic Man.
  - Zippy Lad (voiced by Andrew Rannells in the first two appearances, Sean Schemmel in the third appearance) is a founding member of the original Justice Force who has superhuman speed. In the present day, he uses a wheelchair. Zippy Lad was later seen in "Membership Drive" training the Justice Force's new recruits. He is a parody of Flash.
  - Metal Head (voiced by Wayne Grayson) is a founding member of the Justice Force who has fluid "metal" hair. Due to his artificial nature, Metal Head has not aged in a decade, allowing him to be a member of the Justice Force's second incarnation. When not operating as a superhero, he works as a stock boy at Stephen's comic book store.
  - Doctor Dome (voiced by Stuart Zagnit) is a founding member of the Justice Force. Doctor Dome has the ability to control robots called Domeoids. During his time with the Justice Force, Doctor Dome was saved from the Living Volcano by Stainless Steel Steve and Doctor Dome later cured Steve of the creeping alien rust. He later left the Justice Force following a squabble with Steve over the love of Battling Bernice. Doctor Dome was later revealed to have had a child named Ananda with Bernice.
  - Battling Bernice is a founding member of the Justice Force who appears to have possessed great physical strength. She was killed in action and was revealed to have had a child named Ananda with Doctor Dome.
  - Silver Sentry (voiced by Terrence Archie in most appearances, Marc Diraison in the "Fast Forward" and the "Back to the Sewer" series) is a superhero who would occasionally be partnered with Michelangelo. He would later become the leader of the second incarnation of the Justice Force by the time the Triceratons attacked Earth. In the "Fast Forward" part of the series, it was revealed that Silver Sentry has a grandson who became the second Turtle Titan. He is a parody of Superman.
  - Ananda (voiced by Amy Birnbaum in most appearances, Carrie Keranen in "Super Power Struggle", Veronica Taylor in "The Journal") is the daughter of Battling Bernice and Doctor Dome who previously blamed the Justice Force for her mother's death. After Doctor Dome cleared things up with his daughter on why her mother died, Ananda joined up with the second incarnation of the Justice Force.
  - Chrysalis (voiced by Megan Hollingshead) is a member of the second incarnation of the Justice Force who comes from India. She can create an energy field similar to psychic telekinesis where she can form wings for flight, project energy blasts, and use her mind to manipulate objects.
  - Tsunami (voiced by Darren Dunstan) is an aquakinetic Japanese superhero who is a member of the second incarnation of the Justice Force. He is somewhat similar to Aquaman and Namor.
  - Nobody (voiced by Sean Schemmel) started out as Officer Longe, a police officer who was demoted to archive duty after Ruffington complained to the police commissioner that he was stalking him. Angered at this, Officer Longe became the superhero Nobody and received help from Michelangelo and Leonardo into stopping Ruffington. In "Still Nobody", the Turtles helped Nobody when the Turks planned to threaten two elderly witnesses which ended with the Turks disbanding and their leader ending up arrested. In "Membership Drive", Nobody and Raptarr joined the second incarnation of the Justice Force. He is somewhat similar to Batman.
  - Raptarr (voiced by Marc Diraison) is a member of the Avian (a race of angel-like creatures with bird feet that were created by the Y'Lyntians from human slaves) who met the Turtles when it came to stopping the rogue Avian Mephos. In "Membership Drive", Raptarr joins the second incarnation of the Justice Force. He is reminiscent of Hawkman.
  - Nano (voiced by Veronica Taylor as a child, Anthony Salerno as an adult) was originally a group of small robots with the mind of a 3 year old that were created by Dr. Marion Richards for the government. It later escaped and ran into a street vendor named Harry "The Schlub" Parker and made a body from his broken toys. He fought the Turtles and Casey Jones which ended with him being thrown into the blast furnace. In "Modern Love: The Return of Nano", a part of Nano survived and recreated a body which he uses to spring Harry from prison and abduct Dr. Richards in order to make a happy family. This time, an electronic pulse from a roller coaster at Coney Island was able to defeat Nano. In "Membership Drive", parts of Nano were seen in the wreckage of a Triceraton ship which Baxter Stockman salvages for Bishop. Baxter Stockman placed a control microchip on one of the nanobots in order to control it. It caused an internal conflict that sent Nano on a rampage. In a new body, Nano fought the Turtles and the Justice Force until Michelangelo used Moleculo's shrinking belt to remove the rogue nanite. Afterwards, Nano built a new body and joined up with the Justice Force.
  - Green Mantle (voiced by Sean Schemmel) was originally Al Gordon who found a superpowered cape made by an alien tailor and used to fight crime as the Green Mantle. During a fight with Mechazoid, Green Mantle's cape was knocked off him and was found by a comic book fan. 25 years later, Al Gordon is working as a security guard at a comic book convention when he tries to stop Dr. Malignus from stealing the Green Mantle cape. After Dr. Malignus was defeated by Raphael and Michelangelo, Stainless Steel Steve picked up Al Gordon and the two Turtles give Al Gordon the cape back, enabling him to become Green Mantle once again. He is a spoof of Green Lantern.
- Professor Zayton Honeycutt/Fugitoid (voiced by Oliver Wyman) – Originally a humanoid alien living on the planet D'Hoonib, Honeycutt was struck by lightning during a storm, which transferred his consciousness into his worker robot. He invented a transmatter portal device, which gives the user the ability to teleport anywhere in space. Two warring factions called the Federation and the Triceretons seek to gain control of the device, making Honeycutt a fugitive. When the Turtles encounter him, they attempt to help him escape his fate and keep the device away from both factions.
- The Ninja Tribunal is a group of four ninja masters. They were once five warriors who defeated the Tengu Shredder, but one of them, Oroku Saki, made a deal with the demon and allowed his spirit to inhabit his body in exchange for power. The other four traveled across the world and trained their body and spirit to counter their old comrade and ultimately succeed in sealing him away. Afterwards, they tried to prevent his return and passed their knowledge of martial arts, which later came to be known as Ninjutsu to others.
  - Kon Shisho (voiced by David Zen Mansley) is a member of the Ninja Tribunal and the master of spirit.
  - Juto Shisho (voiced by Marc Thompson) is a member of the Ninja Tribunal and the master of weapons.
  - Chikara Shisho (voiced by Lenore Zann) is a member of the Ninja Tribunal with bandaged feet and legs who is the master of strength.
  - Hisomi Shisho is the largest member of the Ninja Tribunal and the master of stealth who is always silent.
- The Ancient One (voiced by David Chen) is a student of the Ninja Tribunal and the master and father figure of Hamato Yoshi who joins them on their request.
- The Ninja Tribunal Acolytes are four humans were gathered by the Ninja Tribunal to be their acolytes and to train them for the fight against the Tengu Shredder. They trained alongside the Turtles in preparation for the battle with the Tengu Shredder, but seemingly perished along with the Tribunal when the Lap of the Gods was apparently destroyed by the Foot Mystics. They later returned to help the turtles during the final battle with the Demon Shredder.
  - Adam McKay is a large human who is one of the Acolytes of the Ninja Tribunal. Adam is shown to wield a war hammer and a ball and chain. Adam is good friends with Donatello and contributed ideas for the design of the Turtle Taxi. His avatar is the bear and he had something of a crush on Chikara-Shisho.
  - Faraji Ngala is a human from Africa who is one of the Acolytes of the Ninja Tribunal. Faraji's weapon of choice is an African Blade and has become good friends with Leonardo. His avatar is the lion and he received a magical katana that he passed to Leonardo when he believed he was dying, but later had returned upon his return.
  - Joi Reynard is a female Japanese human who is one of the Acolytes of the Ninja Tribunal, and the only female student amongst the Turtles and her fellow humans. Joi's weapons of choice are a rope dart and a staff. Joi is good friends with Raphael and her avatar is the hawk.
  - Tora Yoshida is a human from Japan who is one of the Acolytes of the Ninja Tribunal. He is good friends with Michelangelo despite not usually getting his sense of humor, and wields a pair of sickles in battle. His avatar is the wolf.
- Cody Jones (voiced by Christopher C. Adams) is the great-grandson of April and Casey and the heir of the O'Neil Tech. He is the Turtles' friend and guide in the year 2105 during the Fast Forward season. After his Time Portal accidentally brings the Turtles to his time, he helps them to become accustomed to the Earth's new way of life while trying to rebuild the Time Window and send them home.
- Serling (voiced by Marc Thompson) is Cody's loyal robot servant who is usually annoyed by the Turtles, he later gains a battle mode known as Turtle X which Cody can control. When the Turtles are finally going back to their own time, he is infected by Viral and goes with them. Serling later helps the Turtles defeat the Cyber Shredder.

=== Villains ===
- Oroku Saki/The Shredder (voiced by Scottie Ray) is the archenemy of the Turtles and Splinter and serves as the main villain of the series. Several individuals have assumed the mantle of Shredder and in a possible future, all of them are engaged in a war for control of New York City.
  - Ch'rell, also known as the Utrom Shredder, is an evil Utrom warlord who founded the Foot Clan after being stranded on Earth centuries ago, and indirectly had a hand in the Turtles and Splinter's creation. He based his human disguise and public persona as benevolent philanthropist Oroku Saki on the ancient Japanese legend of a Demon Tengu.
  - The Tengu Shredder was originally a demon in ancient Japan that merged with the soul of its slayer, the warrior Oroku Saki, before being imprisoned by the Ninja Tribunal.
  - The Cyber Shredder is an artificial intelligence copy of Ch'rell that merged with Viral.
- The Foot Clan is a criminal ninja organization founded by the Utrom Shredder in ancient Japan.
  - Karai (voiced by Karen Neill) is the Utrom Shredder's adopted daughter and his second in command from the end of season 2, replacing Hun. Due to her sense of honor, she is usually conflicted with orders she receives from the Shredder. After his defeat, she takes control of the Foot and becomes the next Shredder, seeking revenge on the Turtles for her father's exile. After being forced to team up with the Turtles against the Tengu Shredder, she disbands the Foot and declares a truce with them.
    - Yin and Yang – Karai's personal aides, who appear virtually identical to each other apart from their height. Both of them rarely speak, and wear identical purple and black foot gi. They did not appear often in the series, debuting during the "City at War" arc and later returning to join the battle against the Tengu Shredder.
  - Dr. Chaplin (voiced by Sam Riegel) is a young scientist who was later recruited by the Shredder and idolizes Baxter Stockman and is in love with Karai. Following the Utrom Shredder being exiled to Mor Gal Tai, Dr. Chaplin stays by Karai's side, and becomes the head of her technical division. The two later appear to start a relationship, departing hand-in-hand at the end of "The Lost Episodes" and later attending April and Casey's wedding together. Curiously, he was absent during the events of "Turtles Forever".
  - The Foot Mystics, also known as the Heralds of the Shredder, are five magic-using beings, each presenting one of the five elements. They are the servants of the Tengu Shredder and have also served Utrom Shredder and Karai through an artifact known as the Heart of Tengu. After they manipulated the Turtles and Agent Bishop to steal and destroy it, they were freed and set out to revive their master.
    - The Metal Foot Mystic (voiced by Sean Schemmel) is the leader of the Foot Mystics who possesses ferrokinesis.
    - The Earth Foot Mystic (voiced by Sean Schemmel) is a Foot Mystic who possesses geokinesis.
    - The Fire Foot Mystic (voiced by Sean Schemmel) is a Foot Mystic who possesses pyrokinesis.
    - The Water Foot Mystic (voiced by Brian Maillard) is a Foot Mystic who possesses aquakinesis.
    - The Wind Foot Mystic (voiced by Brian Maillard) is a Foot Mystic who possesses aerokinesis.
  - Master Khan (voiced by Sean Schemmel) is a high-ranking Foot Ninja and the first lieutenant of the Cyber Shredder who was rebuilding the Foot Clan for whenever he would return. It was revealed in an alternative future that he had destroyed the Turtles.
  - The Foot Ninjas are the soldiers of the Foot Clan, who all wear identical black and grew uniforms emblazoned with the Foot emblem. They wield various weapons, but are generally depicted as being inferior ninjas in comparison to the Turtles.
  - The Foot Tech Ninjas are Foot Ninja that can turn invisible thanks to Baxter Stockman's reverse-engineering of Utrom technology. Their cybernetic armor makes them faster and stronger than regular Foot Ninja.
  - The Elite Foot Ninjas (voiced by Ted Lewis) are seemingly most-skilled members of the Foot Clan who serve as Shredder's personal guard and field commanders on specific missions. They appear virtually identical to each other and are only distinguishable from one another by their choice in weapons, which include hook swords, a spear, a trident, and a double-bladed sword. At the time when the Shredder was thought dead, the Foot Elite led the Foot Clan into a turf war against the Purple Dragons and the Mob.
  - The Cyber Foot are a version of the Foot Clan that works for the Cyber Shredder and Maser Khan.
- The Purple Dragons are a street gang associated with the Foot Clan.
  - Hun (voiced by Greg Carey) is the leader of the Purple Dragon and Shredder's second in command until the end of season 2. he was responsible for burning down the shop of Casey's father, and is implied to have killed him, as such became his archenemy. He was also going to kill Hamato Yoshi but Splinter left a scar on his face. Prior to discovering that he is an Utrom, Hun was very loyal to the Shredder and would do anything to gain his favor. After Ch'rell's defeat, Hun returns to the Purple Dragon and turns it from a street gang into a crime syndicate even to the point where they start a list of possible recruits.
  - Dragon Face (voiced by Cedric Leake) is the acting leader of the Purple Dragons who works under Hun. Dragon Face has a tattoo of a dragon on his face. He became the second-in-command to Hun after his predecessor John was killed by the Shredder. Dragon Face later turns on Hun.
  - Fang (voiced by Sean Schemmel) is a member of the Purple Dragons. He has the same hairstyle as John. Vang became Hun's second-in-command after the Purple Dragons were reorganized into a crime syndicate.
  - Bam-Bam is a heavyset member of the Purple Dragons in a backwards cap and dark sunglasses who debuts during the "Back to the Sewer" season.
  - Claw (voiced by Sean Schemmel) is a Purple Dragon member who has a Tekkō-kagi on his right hand who debuts during the "Back to the Sewer" season.
  - Dagger (voiced by Sean Schemmel) is a Purple Dragon member who carries many daggers who debuts during the "Back to the Sewer" season.
  - Mohawk is a member of the Purple Dragons that sports a tall pink mohawk. In Turtles Forever, he is with some other Purple Dragons members who caught the Turtles from the 1988 series reality. When the 2003 series Turtles liberated their counterparts, Mohawk was splashed with Mutagen. Because he had been in contact with a fighting dog that belonged to the Purple Dragons, he was turned into a mutant dog. In his mutated form, he helped Hun attack the two groups of Turtles and the 03 Splinter. Splinter later fired missiles at Mohawk with the Battle Shell, which shredded him. Later at the Purple Dragon Headquarters, Mohawk was somehow still alive and returned to his normal state and fought alongside a mutated Hun against the Turtles and was last seen getting erased from reality due to the Utrom Shredder's plan.
  - Ruffington (voiced by Marc Diraison) is the head of Ruffington Arms who was an ally of the Purple Dragons and a top government weapon supplier. He was first seen being targeted by Nobody, whom he had demoted in the police force for investigating him. Unknowingly, he created a far more dangerous enemy, as Nobody turned vigilante in order to stop Ruffington's operations. Ruffington later makes other appearances helping out Hun and the Purple Dragons in various ways.
  - Spike #1 (voiced by Eric Stuart) is a red spiky-haired member of the Purple Dragons.
  - Spike #2 is a black bald member with a tattoo on his head who debuted during the "Back to the Sewer" season.
  - Spuds (voiced by Brian Maillard) is the leader of the Purple Dragons' Northampton branch.
    - Max is a member of the Purple Dragons' Northampton branch.
  - Sunny is a member of the Purple Dragons with blue hair and a ponytail.
  - The Thorns are twin members of the Purple Dragons who wield sledgehammers and debut during the "Back to the Sewer" season.
  - Two Ton (voiced by Ted Lewis) is a heavyset member of the Purple Dragons who wields a bat with two spikes in it.
  - Waxer is a member of the Purple Dragons who wears a backwards hat who debuts during the "Back to the Sewer" season.
- Baxter Stockman (voiced by Scott Williams) is a scientist working for the Foot clan and the Shredder. After suffering severe punishments at the hands of the Shredder that left him a brain and an eye, he starts to scheme against him and after his defeat, joins the Earth Protection Force and Agent Bishop while gaining a new robotic body. When thought dead in an Organic Mouser accident where an alien saved Bishop's life, Baxter's brain evolved into a mobile brain with an eyestalk and spent years planning revenge on Bishop using Organic Mousers. When Bishop saves Baxter, he plans to use this time period's body to make a new body for him.
- Ue/Ultimate Ninja (voiced by Ted Lewis as an adult, Sam Riegel as a child) is the son of Ultimate Daimyo who first appeared to challenge Leonardo to the death to become the greatest ninja in the universe, to which he loses. During the Battle Nexus Tournament, he returns claiming to be the turtles' friend, but in reality he sided with Drako to kill Leonardo and the Daimyo to take control of the universe. Both fail and are sent drifting through the universe for countless millenniums, causing their bodies to merge into one. Both return to steal the Time Scepter and the Daimyo's war staff and send the turtles into different worlds. After the turtles escape, they fight Drako and Ultimate Ninja until both the war staff and the Time Scepter turn on both and turn them into ashes. Lord Simultaneous then revives Ultimate Ninja into a child so that the Daimyo can raise his son once again.
- Drako (voiced by Marc Thompson) is a dragon warrior from the planet Draconia that previously fought against Master Splinter at the Battle Nexus tournament. He became angry after losing and took his anger out on Splinter until the Ultimate Daimyo drove him away. He forms an alliance with Ultimate Ninja to kill the Daimyo in turn for the Daimyo's war staff. Both fail and are sent drifting through space for thousands of years, causing their bodies to merge into one. Both steal the war staff and the Time Scepter in attempt to take their revenge on the turtles until both the war staff and the scepter turn on Drako and Ultimate Ninja and turning them into ash.
  - The Dark Assassins are a group of warriors employed by Drako and the Ultimate Ninja in their plots. They worked with Drako in an attempt to eliminate Splinter and later the Ultimate Daimyo, and also attacked Leonardo on the Ninja's orders.
- Agent John Bishop (voiced by David Zen Mansley) is the leader of the Earth Protection Force (E.P.F). He was abducted and experimented on by aliens back in 1815 as such he deems any extraterrestrial as a threat, becoming a deadly adversary of the Turtles. After being saved by an alien during a failed experiment, he starts to have second thoughts about them and decides to seek allies instead of enemies which leads to him ultimately becoming President of the Pan Galactic Alliance (P.G.A) and an ally of the Turtles in the Fast Forward season.
- Darius Dun (voiced by David Zen Mansley) is Cody's uncle and guardian and one of the main antagonists of the Fast Forward season. He has taken control of O'Neil Tech and uses it as a cover for his criminal activities which include making weapons and selling them in the black market. He first has a race of endangered warriors known as Inuwashi Gunjin as his slaves and after losing them are provided with the dark counterparts of the Turtles known as Dark Turtles.
- Sh'Okanabo (voiced by Sean Schemmel) is an alien Kanabo warlord and one of the main antagonists of the Fast Forward season. He seeks to unleash the Day of Awakening on Earth, which is turning the inhabitants of Earth into Kanabo Drones, and have his race thrive on Earth until its resources are finished but finds the Earth's sun as an obstacle. To fulfill his plans, he teams up with Darius Dun and gives him the Dark Turtles, monsters that he created by combining the Turtles' DNA with that of Kanabo DNA. In return, Sh'Okanobo receives the blueprints of the Time Window.
  - Viral (voiced by Eva Kaminsky) is a sentient computer virus and Sh'Okanabo's assistant. She aids her master on his quest to bring the Day of Awakening but is ultimately torn to bits by Cody and Serling. Viral returns and uses Serling to get revenge on the Turtles as she goes to their time. Viral accidentally releases the Cyber Shredder from his data storage and becomes a part of him.
- The Dark Turtles are deformed clones of the Ninja Turtles who were created by Sh'Okanabo and controlled by Darius Dun. They were created by combining the DNA of the Ninja Turtles and the DNA of a Kanabo.
  - Dark Leonardo (voiced by Michael Sinterniklaas) is a blue-skinned clone of Leonardo who leads the Dark Turtles and eventually gains a mindset similar to original Leo.
  - Dark Donatello (voiced by Sam Riegel) is a purple-skinned clone of Donatello with wrist guards and a long tail who is the Dark Turtle's residential mad scientist.
  - Dark Raphael (voiced by Greg Abbey) is a red-skinned clone of Raphael with twin talon knuckle dusters who is the most aggressive of the group.
  - Dark Michelangelo (voiced by Wayne Grayson) is a yellow-skinned clone of Michelangelo with orange eyes and a long tongue.
- Triple Threat is a three-headed alien professional wrestler who was banned from wrestling for his violent moves and causes trouble throughout the "Fast Forward" season. His heads consist of a red head with a white face and dreadlocks on his right side (voiced by Marc Odgers), a one-eyed blue head in the middle (voiced by David Zen Mansley), and a yellow head on his left side (voiced by Scottie Ray). Each head has its own personality, Red is violent and likes to destroy things. Blue is calm, is usually the one who comes up with plans, and suggested that Triple Threat become a supervillain. Yellow is crazy, love to create chaos and anarchy, and he usually says crazy things like wanting to eat a comic book which usually makes the other Heads very confused.

=== Others ===
- Hamato Yoshi (voiced by Eric Stuart) is Splinter's owner and a guardian of the Utroms. he was once a homeless boy along with his friend Yukio Mashimi, but both were adopted and trained by the Ancient One and became guardians of the Utroms after learning their secrets. He and Mashimi were in love with Ancient One's daughter Tang Shen who was in love with Yoshi, causing Mashimi to become jealous, murder her, and join the Foot. Yoshi avenges Tang Shen and kills Mashimi for his betrayal. He later moves to New York along with the Utroms, where he's captured and tortured by the Foot Ninjas to reveal the Utrom's location and was murdered by the Shredder when he wouldn't talk. Afterwards, Splinter leaves and eventually finds the Turtles.
- Starlee Hambrath (voiced by Amanda Brown) is a bright and highly intelligent O'Neil Tech intern from the planet Omatran and a friend of Cody and the Turtles in the Fast Forward season. She is shown to have a crush on Cody.
- Constable Biggles (voiced by Sean Schemmel) is a gold robot who is the Chief Constable of the Peace-Keepers (the law enforcement of the Pan Galactic Alliance). He often clashed with the turtles due to their tendency to get involved in stopping criminals such as the Street Phantoms, but demonstrated a willingness to forgive their antics whenever they helped him capture a criminal. Constable Biggles is also shown to have connections with the Turtle Titan of his time.
- Torbin Zixx (voiced by David Elliott) is an intergalactic smuggler and mercenary who usually outsmarts the Turtles and uses them for his own end either as an ally or an enemy.
- Sarge (voiced by Ted Lewis and Brian Mallard) is an old police officer who usually appears in the aftermath of the Turtles' adventures. His appearance is similar to the franchise's co-creator Peter Laird.
- Frank (voiced by Pete Capella) is a young cop who is Sarge's partner, his name is only revealed in the Dreamwave comic adaptation of the series. His appearance is similar to the franchise's co-creator Kevin Eastman.

== Crew ==
- Susan Blu – Voice Director (seasons 1–5)
- Roy Burdine – Voice Director (seasons 6–7)
- Darren Dunstan – ADR Voice Director

== Production ==
In May 2002, 4Kids Entertainment announced to produce a new animated Teenage Mutant Ninja Turtles TV series for the FoxBox programming block to air on Saturday mornings, marking it as their first animated project to be produced fully in-house. The series was renewed for a second season in the summer of 2003; the third in May 2004; the fourth in April 2005.

The "Ninja Tribunal" was originally intended to be the fifth and final season of the 2003 Teenage Mutant Ninja Turtles animated series, but the schedule was altered in an effort to boost interest in the series, resulting in "Fast Forward" becoming the fifth season in terms of airing order. The "Ninja Tribunal" season was initially slated to be released on DVD sometime in early 2007, but 4Kids Entertainment later removed it from their release schedule. In early 2008, between the broadcasts of "Fast Forward" and "Back to the Sewer", 4Kids eventually aired the "Ninja Tribunal" season and promoted it as "Teenage Mutant Ninja Turtles: The Lost Episodes".

Series development was headed by producer Lloyd Goldfine, who had known the Ninja Turtles since the original Mirage Studios comics and declared he "loved the charm of the cartoon", but much preferred the idea of turtles raised to be ninja assassins, and was interested in using said plot while also being family-friendly. Once he heard 4Kids had an interest in the franchise, Goldfine suggested going straight to Mirage for guidance, and then he and other company representatives went to the company's headquarters in Northampton, Massachusetts. Turtles co-creator Peter Laird and Mirage CEO Gary Richardson approved their pitch, and Mirage remained very close during development, with Laird reading every outline and draft of the script, and approving most of the character designs.

== Home video ==
The series was initially released on DVD by FUNimation Entertainment and 4Kids Home Video in various compilation releases, with pre-2005 releases also available on VHS.

On July 25, 2023, Nickelodeon and Paramount Home Entertainment released the entirety of the 2003 series in a single box set. In addition, the digital versions for all seven seasons are presently available as of May 29, 2023, either individually or in a complete series set.

== Merchandise ==
Playmates Toys produced toys based on the series.

== Broadcast history ==
Teenage Mutant Ninja Turtles originally aired in the US on Fox for its first six seasons from February 8, 2003, to October 27, 2007. It then aired on The CW for reruns of its first six seasons, its seventh and final season, and Turtles Forever from September 13, 2008, to February 28, 2009.

On November 24, 2003, 4Kids announced that they had licensed the first 40 episodes of Teenage Mutant Ninja Turtles to Cartoon Network. 4Kids' CEO, Al Kahn, said he was "pleased to be able to broadcast the series with Cartoon Network. Now that we're adding the Cartoon Network audience, we're certain that many more kids across the country will become part of the growing craze and get 'Turtle-ized.'" The show aired on Cartoon Network until March 24, 2007.

Jetix Europe handled pay-TV rights to the series.

Turtles Forever also aired on Nickelodeon on August 29, 2010. The show was eventually broadcast on Nicktoons from 2014 to 2015.

The show (excluding season 5 and Turtles Forever) aired in the Republic of Ireland on RTE Two from September 17, 2003, to 2009.

The series is currently available for streaming on Paramount+, and Pluto TV as part of their "Totally Turtles" channel, which the latter also includes the 2012 series.

== Critical reception ==
Teenage Mutant Ninja Turtles received widespread acclaim and was commercially successful throughout its first five seasons, receiving wide critical praise for the faithfulness to the source material, the storytelling, character development, action, darker tone, humor, the theme song, background music, voice acting, animation and appeal to all ages. It also garnered high ratings for a 4Kids Saturday morning cartoon and shortly after the premiere became the highest-rated and most popular children's television show in the US. Unleash the Fanboy praised the series for its connection to the comic books in story and tone, and it helps that co-creator Peter Laird was closely involved with the series, making sure things stayed on the right path.

4Kids was known for its controversial history of censoring anime, but the series was acclaimed for trying to follow the dark and gritty tone of the original Mirage comics. However, due to 4Kids having to keep their ratings under PG, the last two seasons of series, Fast Forward and Back to the Sewer, was met with negative reception from fans and critics alike.

Several of the characters introduced in the series would later appear in subsequent publications of the TMNT franchise. Hun was introduced into the Mirage Comics with the issue Tales of the Teenage Mutant Ninja Turtles Volume 2 No. 56 in March 2009, and also appears as a recurring figure in the IDW comic series and in the 2012 animated series, as does Agent Bishop. Angel, Ch'rell, Darius Dun, and the Street Phantoms would also be featured in the IDW comics, and the Triceraton Mozar as an antagonist during season 4 of the 2012 series.
