= Greg Abbey =

American voice actor

- Born: Gregory Abbey
- Other name: Frank Frankson
- Education: Rutgers University
- Occupation: Actor
- Years active: 1998–present

Gregory Abbey, also known under the alias Frank Frankson, is an American voice and television actor. He is best known for his roles of Tristan Taylor in Yu-Gi-Oh! Duel Monsters, Yusei Fudo in Yu-Gi-Oh! 5D's, and Raphael from the 2003 TV series of Teenage Mutant Ninja Turtles.

== Filmography ==
=== Anime ===
List of dubbing performances in anime films, TV series and OVAs
Year	Title	Role	Notes	Source
1998	Revolutionary Girl Utena	Tatsuya Kazami		
1999	Wrath of the Ninja: The Yotoden Movie	Jinpei		
1999	Slayers NEXT	Keith, Joe		
2000	Slayers TRY	Kerel, Sirius		
2000	The Irresponsible Captain Tylor	Additional Voices	OVA	
2001	Ping-Pong Club	Brother, Junpei		
2001	Harlock Saga	Alberich	OVA	
2001–06	Yu-Gi-Oh! Duel Monsters	Tristan Taylor		
2002	Berserk	Godo		
2002	Now and Then, Here and There	Oda, Additional Voices		
2002	Ultimate Muscle	Terry Kenyon, D-Struction, Forkolossus, Skullduggery, Sly Scraper		
2003	Samurai Deeper Kyo	Shinrei, Mika's Father		
2003	Sonic X	Sam Speed		
2004	Domain of Murder	Tsuyoshi Toyama	OVA	
2004	Shura no Toki: Age of Chaos	Genjiro Kuki		
2004	Giant Robo	Chujo Shizuo	OVA	
2004	One Piece	Ripper	4kids edit	
2004	Yu-Gi-Oh! The Movie: Pyramid of Light	Tristan Taylor		
2004	Shaman King	Liam Diethel, Ryo Kamishiro, Haloune		
2005	Gin Rei	Chujo Shizuo	OVA, Episode 2	
2005	Shingu: Secret of the Stellar Wars	Jiltosh, Konkol		
2005	Mew Mew Power	Ian	Episode "Books of Love"	
2005	Yu-Gi-Oh! GX	Damon	Episode "Nature of the Draw"	
2006	G.I. Joe: Sigma 6	Duke		
2006	Yu-Gi-Oh! Capsule Monsters	Tristan Taylor		
2008	Freedom	Taira	OVA	
2008–11	Yu-Gi-Oh! 5D's	Yusei Fudo		
2009	Kurokami: The Animation	Chairman Kaionji, Additional Voices		
2009	Dinosaur King	Genzo Sansho Hoshi	4 episodes	
2011	Yu-Gi-Oh!: Bonds Beyond Time	Yusei Fudo		
2015	009 Re:Cyborg	Void		
2017	Yu-Gi-Oh!: The Dark Side of Dimensions	Tristan Taylor		
2021	Shaman King	Ryo Sugimoto	Netflix dub	

=== Animation ===
List of voice performances in animation
Year	Title	Role	Notes	Source
2003–09	Teenage Mutant Ninja Turtles	Raphael	As Frank Frankson	
2004–07	Winx Club	Brandon	4Kids English dub	
2006–09	Chaotic	Sobtjek		
2009	Turtles Forever	2003 Raphael		
2009	Astonishing X-Men	Cyclops/Scott Summers	Motion comic	
2011–13	Speed Racer: The Next Generation	Headmaster Spritle, Speed Racer Sr.	Season 2, replacing Peter Fernandez	
2011–16	SkaterBots	Hunter	Main cast	

=== Live-action television ===
List of live-action television roles
Year	Title	Role	Notes
2006	Six Degrees	Suit Man #2	Episode: "A New Light"
2012	Blue Bloods	Investigator Davis	Episode: "Scorched Earth"
2013	Deception	Marketing Guy	Episode: "Pilot"
2013	Royal Pains	He	Episode: "Vertigo"
2013	Unforgettable	Wall Street Guy	Episode: "Incognito"
2013	The Michael J. Fox Show	Coach Greg	Episode: "Hobbies"
2014	Elementary	Daren	Episode: "End of Watch"
2015	Chicago Med	Joel Donahue	Episode: "Derailed"
2017	The Wizard of Lies	FBI Agent	TV film
2019	Jessica Jones	Mitch Yasdan	Episode: "A.K.A. The Perfect Burger"
2019	The Code	Dominic Kroll	Episode: "Smoke-Pit"
2019	The Marvelous Mrs. Maisel	Pat	Episode: "Marvelous Radio"
2020	Bull	ADA Donoghue	Episode: "Off the Rails"
2020	The Baker and the Beauty	Rick Jameson	Episode: "You Can't Always Get What You Want"

=== Video games ===
List of voice and dubbing performances in video games
Year	Title	Role	Notes	Source
2003	Teenage Mutant Ninja Turtles	Raphael		
2004	Teenage Mutant Ninja Turtles 2: Battle Nexus	Raphael		
2004	Yu-Gi-Oh! Capsule Monster Coliseum	Tristan Taylor	English dub	
2005	Teenage Mutant Ninja Turtles: Mutant Melee	Raphael		
2008	Insecticide	Roachy Caruthers		
2009	Teenage Mutant Ninja Turtles: Smash-Up	Raphael, Nightwatcher	As Frank Frankson	
2009	Teenage Mutant Ninja Turtles: Turtles in Time Re-Shelled	Raphael, Cement Man, Foot Soldier	As Frank Frankson	
2016	Yu-Gi-Oh! Duel Links	Tristan Taylor, Yusei Fudo	English dub	
