= Scott Rayow =

American voice actor

- Occupation: Voice actor
- Years active: 2000–present

Scott Rayow, often credited as Scottie Ray, is an American voice actor who has worked for NYAV Post, DuArt Film and Video, 4Kids Entertainment, and Central Park Media. He is best known for voicing the Shredder in the 2003 Teenage Mutant Ninja Turtles series.

== Filmography ==
=== Anime ===
List of dubbing performances in anime films, TV series and OVAs
Year	Title	Role	Notes
2000	Slayers TRY	Valgaav, Erulogos, Additional Voices	
2000	The Irresponsible Captain Tylor	Various characters	OVAs
2001	Night on the Galactic Railroad	Dairy Man	
2001	Harlock Saga	Tadashi Daiba, Fafner	OVA
2001	RG Veda	Yasha	OVA
2002	Now and Then, Here and There	Sergeant, Elamba	
2002	Geobreeders: Breakthrough	Yajima	OVA
2003	GoShogun: The Time Stranger	Shingo Hojoh	OVA
2005, 2007	Ah! My Goddess	Hikozaemon Otaki, Additional Voices	
2005–08	Yu-Gi-Oh! GX	Zane Truesdale, Additional Voices	
2008	Yu-Gi-Oh! 5D's	Devack	
2010	Slayers Revolution	Duclis	
2010	Mobile Suit Gundam Unicorn	Additional Voices	OVA
2011	Bakuman	Soichi Aida	
2016	Psychic School Wars	Kyogoku's Familiar	
2016	Mai Mai Miracle	Tatsuyoshi's Father	
2021	Fena: Pirate Princess	Yukihisa Sanada ^{Ep. 2 credits}	

=== Animation ===
List of voice performances in animation
Year	Title	Role	Notes
2000–02	Celebrity Deathmatch	Various Celebrities	
2003–09	Teenage Mutant Ninja Turtles	Ch'rell/Oroku Saki/The Shredder	
2005–06	G.I. Joe: Sigma 6	Long Range	
2006	Wulin Warriors	Scarab	
2006–10	Thumb Wrestling Federation	Senator Skull	
2007	Ratatoing	Oscar	
2007	Viva Piñata	El Sketcho	
2009	Turtles Forever	The 2003 Shredder	
2009	Astonishing X-Men	Nick Fury	Motion comic
2010	Chaotic	Roderick Rothington	
2011	Shaktimaan Animated	Kilvish	
2012	Huntik: Secrets & Seekers	Lucas Casterwill	
2012	Ronal the Barbarian	Gorak	
2015	Zarafa	Moreno	
2016	The Snow Queen 3: Fire and Ice	Arrog	
2019	The Snow Queen: Mirrorlands	Arrog	

=== Video games ===
List of voice and dubbing performances in video games
Year	Title	Role	Notes	Source
2001	Shadow Hearts	Albert Simon		
2003	Teenage Mutant Ninja Turtles	Oroku Saki/The Shredder		
2004	Teenage Mutant Ninja Turtles 2: Battle Nexus	The Shredder		
2004	Shaman King: Power of Spirit	Joto No.3/Werewolf		
2005	Teenage Mutant Ninja Turtles: Mutant Melee	Oroku Saki/The Shredder		
2005	Teenage Mutant Ninja Turtles 3: Mutant Nightmare	The Shredder		
2006	Shadow Hearts: From the New World	Lenny Curtis, Gilbert		
2007	Bullet Witch	Additional Voices		
2009	Teenage Mutant Ninja Turtles: Smash-Up	The Shredder		
2009	Teenage Mutant Ninja Turtles: Turtles in Time Re-Shelled	The Shredder		
2013	Gangstar Vegas	Frank, Radio Ads		
2017	Yu-Gi-Oh! Duel Links	Zane Truesdale		
2018	Pathfinder: Kingmaker	Harrim		
2021	Pathfinder: Wrath of the Righteous	Greybor		
2023	Wo Long: Fallen Dynasty	Cheng Pu		
