= Darren Dunstan =

Canadian voice actor

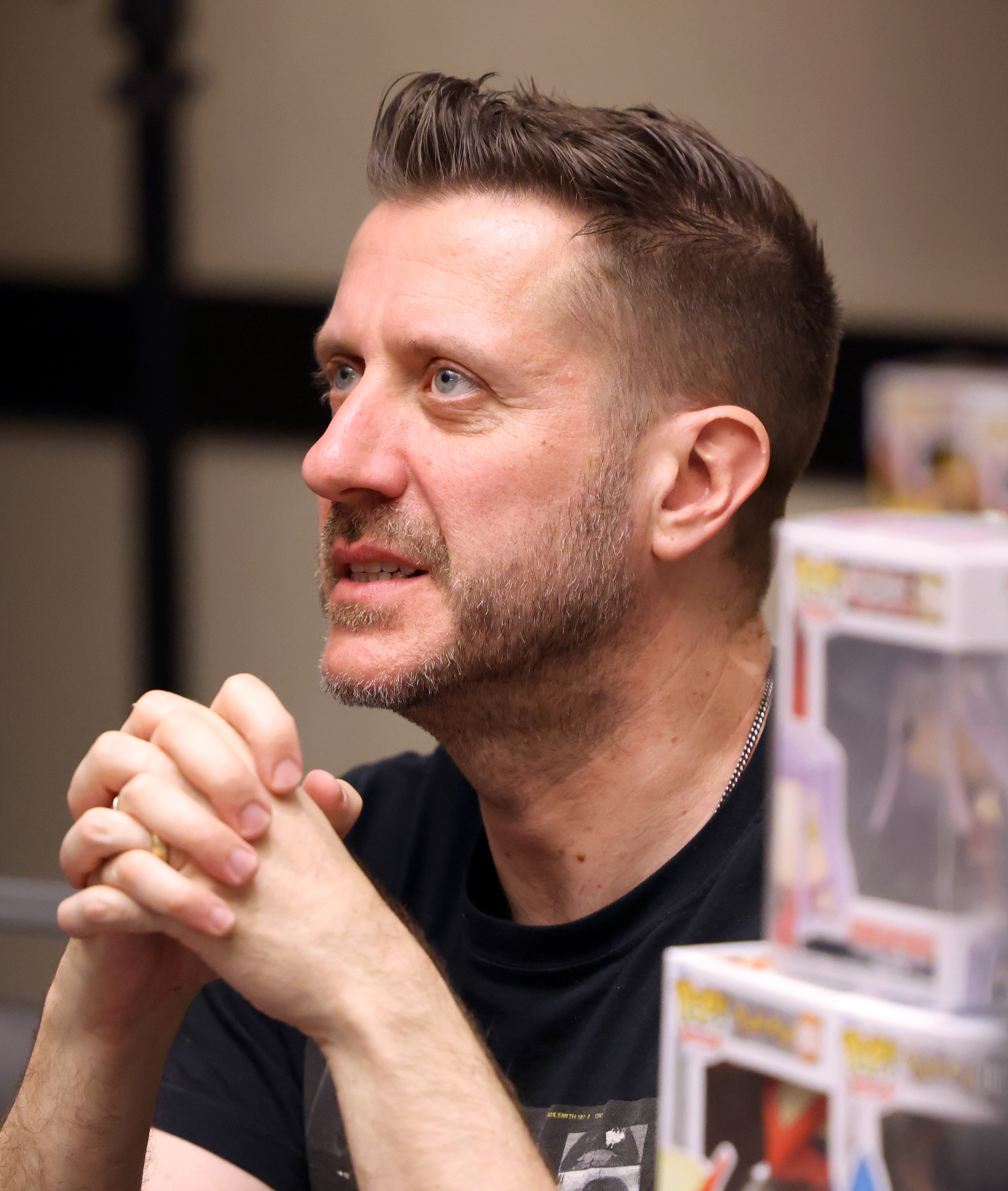
- Dunstan in 2025
- Occupations: Voice actor; voice director
- Years active: 2001–present
- Spouse: Jamie Cuthbert (m. 2016)
- Website: https://www.darrendunstan.com/

Darren Dunstan is a Canadian voice actor and director based in New York City. He has provided voice-over and voice direction on several properties of 4Kids Entertainment, as well as DuArt Film and Video. Dunstan's most notable roles include Maximillion Pegasus in the English dub version of Yu-Gi-Oh!, Splinter in the 2003 TV series of Teenage Mutant Ninja Turtles, and various roles in the Pokémon anime.

== Filmography ==
=== Anime ===
List of voice performances and production roles in anime
Year	Title	Role	Crew role, Notes	Source
1997–2010	Pokémon	Romeo, Stephan, Blaziken, others	Voice director	
2001–06	Yu-Gi-Oh!	Maximillion Pegasus		
2002–06	Ultimate Muscle: The Kinnikuman Legacy	Minch, Vance McMadd		
2003–06	Sonic X	Mr. Tanaka, Bocoe		
2007–08	Yu-Gi-Oh! GX	Maximillion Pegasus, Nero		
2007–10	Dinosaur King		Voice director	
2011	Yu-Gi-Oh! 5D's	Andre	Voice director	
2011–15	Yu-Gi-Oh! Zexal	Mr. Kay, Orbital 7 (Season 4–6)	Voice director	
2016	Yu-Gi-Oh! Arc-V	Jean-Michael Roget	Voice director	

=== Film ===
List of voice performances and production roles in film
Year	Title	Role	Crew role, Notes	Source
2004	Yu-Gi-Oh! the Movie: Pyramid of Light	Maximillion Pegasus		
2009	Turtles Forever	2003 Splinter	Voice director	
2010	Yu-Gi-Oh! Bonds Beyond Time	Maximillion Pegasus		

=== Animation ===
List of voice performances and production roles in animation
Year	Title	Role	Crew role, Notes	Source
2011	Tai Chi Chasers	General Vicious		
2010–16	The Daltons	Melvin Peabody, Rintindumb	Voice	
2006	Padre Pio	Padre Pio	Voice	
2006–10	Chaotic	Kaz Kalinkas	Voice director	
2006–09	Viva Piñata	General, Reinhardt		
	Funky Cops	Jerry, Jeff		
2005	G.I. Joe Sigma Six	Spirit		
2003–09	Teenage Mutant Ninja Turtles	Splinter	adr Voice director	
	Pat & Stan		Voice director	
2001–03	Cubix		Voice director	
	Fighting Foodons		Voice director	
	Rick and Steve		Voice director	
2008–09	GoGoRiki		Voice director	

=== Video games ===
List of voice performances and production roles in video games
Year	Title	Role	Crew role, Notes	Source
	Yu-Gi-Oh! 5Ds		Voice director; English dub	
	Pokémon games		Voice director; English dub	
2009	Teenage Mutant Ninja Turtles: Smash-Up	Splinter, Announcer	Voice director on some TMNT games	
	Chaotic games		Voice director	

== Theatre and singing ==
Dunstan is also a singer and has had success in musical theatre. He performed at Radio City Music Hall with the US National Tour of Pokémon Live! as Giovanni. Regional production credits of his include Assassins (John Wilkes Booth), Sweeney Todd: The Demon Barber of Fleet Street (Sweeney Todd), The Secret Garden (Dr. Neville Craven), and Godspell (Jesus). He had his Lincoln Center debut in Triumph of Love at the Kaplan Penthouse.

He also has performed with the Boston Pops and Toronto Symphony Orchestra. He performs regularly as a singer/pianist at various New York cabaret venues.

== Education ==
Dunstan studied music and theatre at The Boston Conservatory (Master of Musical Theatre) and University of Toronto (Bachelor of Music).

== Personal life ==
Dunstan is openly gay; he and his husband, Jamie Cuthbert, were married in 2016.
