= David Zen Mansley =

American voice actor

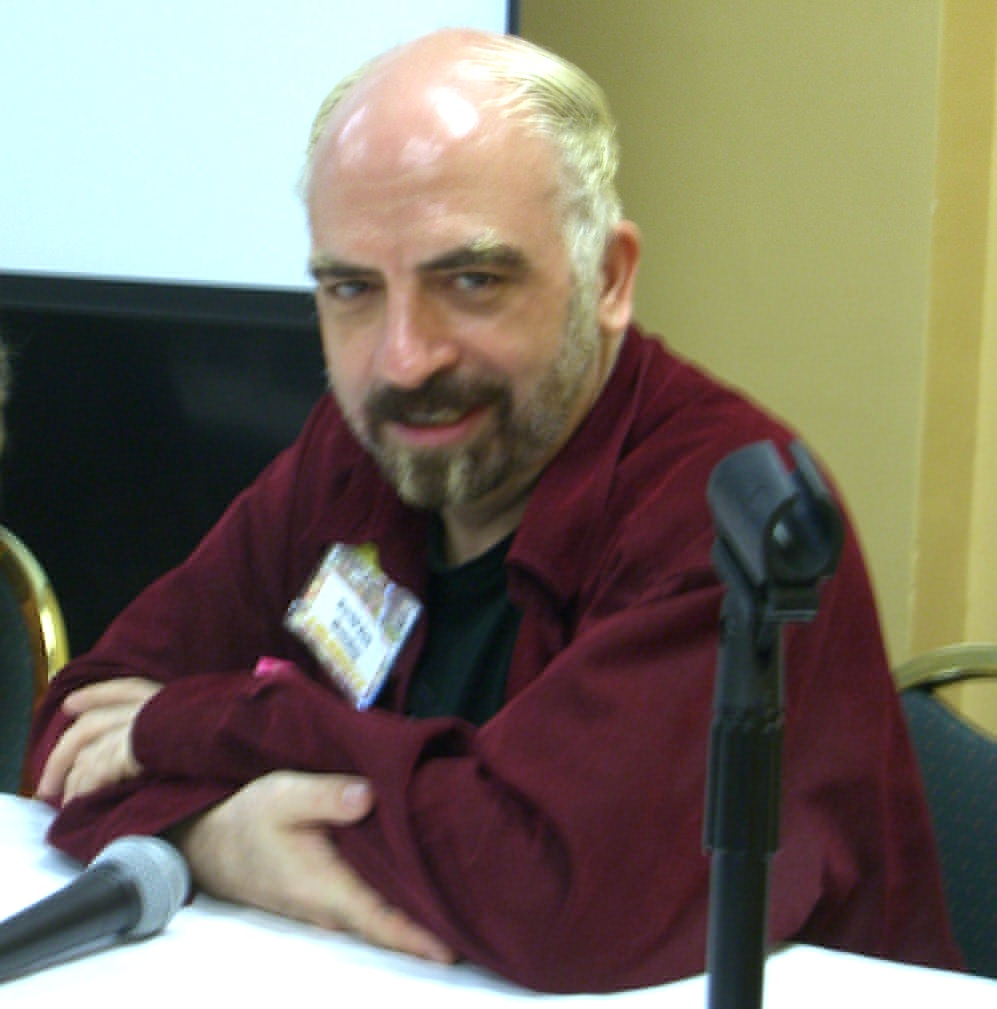
- Mansley speaking on a panel on voice acting at the Big Apple Convention in Manhattan, June 8, 2008.
- Occupation: Voice actor
- Years active: 2000–present

David Zen Mansley is an American voice actor. He is best known for voicing John Bishop and various other characters in Teenage Mutant Ninja Turtles (2003). He has also provided the voice for Professor Armand Aniskov in Speed Racer: The Next Generation, Nefertari Nebra in the 4Kids dub of One Piece, and Lord Van Bloot in Chaotic.

== Filmography ==
- Chaotic (TV series) – Lord Van Bloot
- Giant Robo: The Animation – Q Boss (ep. 1), Professor Simule (NYAV Post dub)
- One Piece – Nefertari Nebra (4Kids version)
- Speed Racer: The Next Generation – Professor Armand Aniskov, Stan Gibbon
- Teenage Mutant Ninja Turtles (2003) – John Bishop, Savanti Romero, Rat King, Mr. Sun, Darius Dun, Kon Shisho
- Yu-Gi-Oh! Zexal II – Abyss

== Theater ==
In addition to voice work, Mansley works off-broadway as an actor, director, set-designer, and script writer.
