= List of Usagi Yojimbo stories =

This list of Usagi Yojimbo stories features stories from the Usagi Yojimbo comic book.

== Fantagraphics series ==
PUBLICATION	ISSUE #	DATE	STORY TITLE	NOTES
Usagi Yojimbo Summer Special (Fantagraphics)	issue # 1	Oct/1986	The Goblin of Adachigahara	originally titled Usagi Yojimbo in Albedo #2
Usagi Yojimbo Summer Special (Fantagraphics)	issue # 1	Oct/1986	Lone Rabbit and Child	originally published in Albedo #3 and #4
Usagi Yojimbo Summer Special (Fantagraphics)	issue # 1	Oct/1986	The Confession	
Usagi Yojimbo v. 1 (Fantagraphics)	issue # 1	Jul/1987	Samurai! part 1	
Usagi Yojimbo v. 1 (Fantagraphics)	issue # 1	Jul/1987	Samurai! part 2	
Usagi Yojimbo v. 1 (Fantagraphics)	issue #2	Sep/1987	Samurai! part 3	
Usagi Yojimbo v. 1 (Fantagraphics)	issue #2	Sep/1987	Samurai! part 4	
Usagi Yojimbo v. 1 (Fantagraphics)	issue #3	Oct/1987	Samurai! part 5	
Usagi Yojimbo v. 1 (Fantagraphics)	issue #3	Oct/1987	Samurai! part 6	
Usagi Yojimbo v. 1 (Fantagraphics)	issue #4	Nov/1987	Samurai! part 7	
Usagi Yojimbo v. 1 (Fantagraphics)	issue #4	Nov/1987	Samurai! part 8	
Usagi Yojimbo v. 1 (Fantagraphics)	issue #5	Jan/1988	Silk Fair	
Usagi Yojimbo v. 1 (Fantagraphics)	issue #6	Feb/1988	Kappa	
Usagi Yojimbo v. 1 (Fantagraphics)	issue #6	Feb/1988	Zylla	
Usagi Yojimbo v. 1 (Fantagraphics)	issue #6	Feb/1988	The Test	featuring “Young” Usagi, later collected as part of Samurai
Usagi Yojimbo v. 1 (Fantagraphics)	issue #7	Mar/1988	The Tower	first appearance of Spot
Usagi Yojimbo v. 1 (Fantagraphics)	issue #8	May/1988	A Mother's Love	
Usagi Yojimbo v. 1 (Fantagraphics)	issue #9	Jul/1988	Return of the Blind Swordspig	
Usagi Yojimbo v. 1 (Fantagraphics)	issue #10	Aug/1988	Blade of the Gods	first appearance of Jei
Usagi Yojimbo v. 1 (Fantagraphics)	issue #11	Sep/1988	The Tea Cup	
Usagi Yojimbo v. 1 (Fantagraphics)	issue #12	Oct/1988	The Shogun's Gift	
Usagi Yojimbo v. 1 (Fantagraphics)	issue #13	Nov/1988	The Dragon Bellow Conspiracy part 1 The Clouds Gather	
Usagi Yojimbo v. 1 (Fantagraphics)	issue #14	Jan/1989	The Dragon Bellow Conspiracy part 2 The Winds Howl	
Usagi Yojimbo v. 1 (Fantagraphics)	issue #15	Mar/1989	The Dragon Bellow Conspiracy part 3 Downpour	
Usagi Yojimbo v. 1 (Fantagraphics)	issue #16	May/1989	The Dragon Bellow Conspiracy part 4 Thunder and Lightning	
Usagi Yojimbo v. 1 (Fantagraphics)	issue #17	Jul/1989	The Dragon Bellow Conspiracy part 5 In the Heart of the Storm	
Usagi Yojimbo v. 1 (Fantagraphics)	issue #18	Oct/1989	The Dragon Bellow Conspiracy part 6 Storm Clouds Part	
Usagi Yojimbo v. 1 (Fantagraphics)	issue #18	Oct/1989	The Dragon Bellow Conspiracy part 7 Fate of the Blind Swordspig	
Usagi Yojimbo v. 1 (Fantagraphics)	issue #19	Dec/1989	Frost and Fire	
Usagi Yojimbo v. 1 (Fantagraphics)	issue #20	Feb/1990	A Kite Story	
Usagi Yojimbo v. 1 (Fantagraphics)	issue #21	Apr/1990	Blood wings part 1	First appearance of the Komori Ninja
Usagi Yojimbo v. 1 (Fantagraphics)	issue #22	May/1990	Blood Wings part 2	
Usagi Yojimbo v. 1 (Fantagraphics)	issue #22	May/1990	Usagi's Ark	featuring Miyamoto Usagi and the crew of the Space Ark
Usagi Yojimbo v. 1 (Fantagraphics)	issue #23	Jul/1990	The Way of the Samurai	
Usagi Yojimbo v. 1 (Fantagraphics)	issue #24	Sep/1990	Lone Goat and Kid	
Usagi Yojimbo v. 1 (Fantagraphics)	issue #25	Nov/1990	The Bridge	
Usagi Yojimbo v. 1 (Fantagraphics)	issue #26	Jan/1991	The Dual	
Usagi Yojimbo v. 1 (Fantagraphics)	issue #27	Mar/1991	My Lords Daughter	
Usagi Yojimbo v. 1 (Fantagraphics)	issue #28	May/1991	Circles part 1 Winds over the Tombstones	
Usagi Yojimbo v. 1 (Fantagraphics)	issue #29	Jul/1991	Circles part 2 Remembrances	
Usagi Yojimbo v. 1 (Fantagraphics)	issue #30	Sep/1991	Circles part 3 Shroud over the Mountain	
Usagi Yojimbo v. 1 (Fantagraphics)	issue #31	Nov/1991	Circles part 3 Shroud over the Mountain (continued)	
Usagi Yojimbo v. 1 (Fantagraphics)	issue #31	Nov/1991	Circles part 4 - Closing the Circle	
Usagi Yojimbo v. 1 (Fantagraphics)	issue #32	Feb/1992	Kitsune	first appearance of Kitsune
Usagi Yojimbo v. 1 (Fantagraphics)	issue #32	Feb/1992	Gaki	featuring “Young” Usagi
Usagi Yojimbo v. 1 (Fantagraphics)	issue #33	Apr/1992	Broken Ritual	story idea by Sergio Aragones
Usagi Yojimbo v. 1 (Fantagraphics)	issue #34	Jun/1992	Gen part 1 Lady Asano's Story	
Usagi Yojimbo v. 1 (Fantagraphics)	issue #34	Jun/1992	Usagi Yojimbo Meets Panda Khan	Written by Monica Sharp. Art by Dave Garcia
Usagi Yojimbo v. 1 (Fantagraphics)	issue #35	Aug/1992	Gen part 2 Sins of the Father	
Usagi Yojimbo v. 1 (Fantagraphics)	issue #36	Nov/1992	Gen part 3 Lady Asano's Revenge	
Usagi Yojimbo v. 1 (Fantagraphics)	issue #37	Feb/1993	The Return of Kitsune	
Usagi Yojimbo v. 1 (Fantagraphics)	issue #38	Mar/1993	The Last Ino Story	
Usagi Yojimbo Color Special (Fantagraphics)	issue #1	Nov/1989	Tomoe’s Story	
Usagi Yojimbo Color Special (Fantagraphics)	issue #1	Nov/1989	Village of Fear	originally published in Doomsday Squad #3
Usagi Yojimbo Color Special (Fantagraphics)	issue #2	Sep/1991	The Doors	
Usagi Yojimbo Color Special (Fantagraphics)	issue #3	Sep/1992	Fox Fire	

== Mirage series ==
PUBLICATION	ISSUE #	DATE	STORY TITLE	NOTES
Usagi Yojimbo v. 2 (Mirage)	issue # 1	Mar/1993	Shades of Green part 1	featuring guest appearance of Teenage Mutant Ninja Turtles
Usagi Yojimbo v. 2 (Mirage)	issue # 1	Mar/1993	Jizo	
Usagi Yojimbo v. 2 (Mirage)	issue # 2	May/1993	Shades of Green part 2	featuring guest appearance of Teenage Mutant Ninja Turtles
Usagi Yojimbo v. 2 (Mirage)	issue # 2	May/1993	Usagi's Garden	featuring “Young” Usagi
Usagi Yojimbo v. 2 (Mirage)	issue # 3	Jul/1993	Shades of Green part 3	featuring guest appearance of Teenage Mutant Ninja Turtles
Usagi Yojimbo v. 2 (Mirage)	issue # 3	Jul/1993	Autumn	featuring “Young” Usagi
Usagi Yojimbo v. 2 (Mirage)	issue # 4	Sep/1993	Shi part 1	
Usagi Yojimbo v. 2 (Mirage)	issue # 5	Dec/1993	Shi part 2	
Usagi Yojimbo v. 2 (Mirage)	issue # 6	Jan/1994	The Lizard's Tale	incorporates One Night in the Cold from Critters #23
Usagi Yojimbo v. 2 (Mirage)	issue # 6	Jan/1994	Battlefield part 1	featuring “Young” Usagi
Usagi Yojimbo v. 2 (Mirage)	issue # 7	Apr/1994	The Music of Heaven	
Usagi Yojimbo v. 2 (Mirage)	issue # 7	Apr/1994	Battlefield part 2	featuring “Young” Usagi
Usagi Yojimbo v. 2 (Mirage)	issue # 8	Jun/1994	The Gambler, the Widow, and the Ronin	titled Blood Money on the table of contents page
Usagi Yojimbo v. 2 (Mirage)	issue # 8	Jun/1994	Battlefield part 3	featuring “Young” Usagi
Usagi Yojimbo v. 2 (Mirage)	issue # 9	Aug/1994	Slavers part 1	
Usagi Yojimbo v. 2 (Mirage)	issue # 10	Oct/1994	Slavers part 2	
Usagi Yojimbo v. 2 (Mirage)	issue # 10	Oct/1994	Nature of the Viper	featuring Jei San
Usagi Yojimbo v. 2 (Mirage)	issue # 11	Dec/1994	Daisho part 1	
Usagi Yojimbo v. 2 (Mirage)	issue # 11	Dec/1994	Mongrels	featuring Gennosuke and Stray Dog
Usagi Yojimbo v. 2 (Mirage)	issue # 12	Feb/1995	Daisho part 2	
Usagi Yojimbo v. 2 (Mirage)	issue # 13	Apr/1995	Runaways part 1	
Usagi Yojimbo v. 2 (Mirage)	issue # 13	Apr/1995	Black Soul	featuring Jei San
Usagi Yojimbo v. 2 (Mirage)	issue # 14	Jun/1995	Runaways part 2	
Usagi Yojimbo v. 2 (Mirage)	issue # 15	Aug/1995	Kaiso	
Usagi Yojimbo v. 2 (Mirage)	issue # 16	Oct/1995	A Meeting of Strangers	first appearance of Inazuma

== Dark Horse series ==
PUBLICATION	ISSUE #	DATE	STORY TITLE	NOTES
Usagi Yojimbo v. 3 (Dark Horse)	issue #1	April/1996	Origin Tale	
Usagi Yojimbo v. 3 (Dark Horse)	issue #1	April/1996	Noodles part 1	
Usagi Yojimbo v. 3 (Dark Horse)	issue #2	May/1996	Noodles part 2	
Usagi Yojimbo v. 3 (Dark Horse)	issue #3	Jun/1996	The Wrath of the Tangled Skein	
Usagi Yojimbo v. 3 (Dark Horse)	issue #3	Jun/1996	The Bonze's Story	
Usagi Yojimbo v. 3 (Dark Horse)	issue #4	Jul/1996	Bats, the Cat, and the Rabbit	
Usagi Yojimbo v. 3 (Dark Horse)	issue #5	Aug/1996	The Chrysanthemum Pass	
Usagi Yojimbo v. 3 (Dark Horse)	issue #6	Oct/1996	Lightning Strikes Twice	
Usagi Yojimbo v. 3 (Dark Horse)	issue #7	Nov/1996	The Withered Field	
Usagi Yojimbo v. 3 (Dark Horse)	issue #8	Dec/1996	A Promise In The Snow	
Usagi Yojimbo v. 3 (Dark Horse)	issue #9	Jan/1997	The Conspiracy of Eight	
Usagi Yojimbo v. 3 (Dark Horse)	issue #10	Feb/1997	Return to Adachi Plain	Revised from watercolor version in Book 4 s/n ltd edition
Usagi Yojimbo v. 3 (Dark Horse)	issue #10	Feb/1997	The Crossing	featuring Jei San
Usagi Yojimbo v. 3 (Dark Horse)	issue #10	Feb/1997	Patience of the Spider	featuring General Ikeda
Usagi Yojimbo v. 3 (Dark Horse)	issue #11	Mar/1997	The Lord of Owls	
Usagi Yojimbo v. 3 (Dark Horse)	issue #11	Mar/1997	The First Tenet	featuring the Neko Ninja
Usagi Yojimbo v. 3 (Dark Horse)	issue #12	Apr/1997	Vampire Cat of the Geishu	also titled “Obakeneko of the Geishu Clan"
Usagi Yojimbo v. 3 (Dark Horse)	issue #13	Aug/1997	Grasscutter prologue 1 - Izanagi and Izanami	
Usagi Yojimbo v. 3 (Dark Horse)	issue #13	Aug/1997	Grasscutter prologue 2 - Susano-o	
Usagi Yojimbo v. 3 (Dark Horse)	issue #13	Aug/1997	Grasscutter prologue 3 - Yamato-Dake	
Usagi Yojimbo v. 3 (Dark Horse)	issue #14	Sep/1997	Grasscutter prologue 4 - Dan-No-Ura	
Usagi Yojimbo v. 3 (Dark Horse)	issue #15	Oct/1997	Grasscutter chapter 1 - Jei	
Usagi Yojimbo v. 3 (Dark Horse)	issue #16	Nov/1997	Grasscutter chapter 2 - Heike Gani	
Usagi Yojimbo v. 3 (Dark Horse)	issue #17	Jan/1998	Grasscutter chapter 3 - Inazuma	
Usagi Yojimbo v. 3 (Dark Horse)	issue #18	Feb/1998	Grasscutter chapter 4 - Noriyuki and Tomoe	
Usagi Yojimbo v. 3 (Dark Horse)	issue #19	Mar/1998	Grasscutter chapter 5 - Ikeda	
Usagi Yojimbo v. 3 (Dark Horse)	issue #20	Apr/1998	Grasscutter chapter 6 - Tomoe and Ikeda	
Usagi Yojimbo v. 3 (Dark Horse)	issue #21	Jun/1998	Grasscutter chapter 7 - Usagi and Jei	
Usagi Yojimbo v. 3 (Dark Horse)	issue #22	Jul/1998	Grasscutter chapter 8 - Sanshobo	
Usagi Yojimbo v. 3 (Dark Horse)	issue #23	Sep/1998	My Father's Swords	
Usagi Yojimbo v. 3 (Dark Horse)	issue #24	Oct/1998	The Demon Flute	
Usagi Yojimbo v. 3 (Dark Horse)	issue #25	Nov/1998	Momo-Usagi-Taro	
Usagi Yojimbo v. 3 (Dark Horse)	issue #26	Jan/1999	The Hairpin Murders part 1	An Inspector Ishida Mystery
Usagi Yojimbo v. 3 (Dark Horse)	issue #27	Feb/1999	The Hairpin Murders part 2	An Inspector Ishida Mystery
Usagi Yojimbo v. 3 (Dark Horse)	issue #28	Apr/1999	The Courtesan part 1	
Usagi Yojimbo v. 3 (Dark Horse)	issue #29	May/1999	The Courtesan part 2	
Usagi Yojimbo v. 3 (Dark Horse)	issue #30	Jul/1999	Tameshigiri	An Inspector Ishida Mystery
Usagi Yojimbo v. 3 (Dark Horse)	issue #31	Sep/1999	The Inn on Moon Shadow Hill	
Usagi Yojimbo v. 3 (Dark Horse)	issue #32	Oct/1999	A Life of Mush	
Usagi Yojimbo v. 3 (Dark Horse)	issue #32	Oct/1999	Deserters	featuring the Neko Ninja
Usagi Yojimbo v. 3 (Dark Horse)	issue #33	Nov/1999	A Potter's Tale	
Usagi Yojimbo v. 3 (Dark Horse)	issue #33	Nov/1999	The Missive	featuring “Young” Usagi
Usagi Yojimbo v. 3 (Dark Horse)	issue #34	Dec/1999	Mystery of the Demon Mask chapter 1	
Usagi Yojimbo v. 3 (Dark Horse)	issue #35	Jan/2000	Mystery of the Demon Mask chapter 2	
Usagi Yojimbo v. 3 (Dark Horse)	issue #36	Feb/2000	Mystery of the Demon Mask chapter 3	
Usagi Yojimbo v. 3 (Dark Horse)	issue #37	Apr/2000	Kumo	featuring Sasuké, Demon Queller
Usagi Yojimbo v. 3 (Dark Horse)	issue #38	May/2000	Reunion	
Usagi Yojimbo v. 3 (Dark Horse)	issue #39	Jul/2000	Grasscutter 2: Journey to Atsuta Shrine - Prologue	
Usagi Yojimbo v. 3 (Dark Horse)	issue #40	Aug/2000	Grasscutter 2: Journey to Atsuta Shrine chapter 1 - A Whisper of Wings	
Usagi Yojimbo v. 3 (Dark Horse)	issue #41	Sep/2000	Grasscutter 2: Journey to Atsuta Shrine chapter 2 - Scent of the Pines	
Usagi Yojimbo v. 3 (Dark Horse)	issue #42	Oct/2000	Grasscutter 2: Journey to Atsuta Shrine chapter 3 - The Hunger for Death	
Usagi Yojimbo v. 3 (Dark Horse)	issue #43	Nov/2000	Grasscutter 2: Journey to Atsuta Shrine chapter 4 - Visions in the Shadows	
Usagi Yojimbo v. 3 (Dark Horse)	issue #44	Dec/2000	Grasscutter 2: Journey to Atsuta Shrine chapter 5 - The Feel of Salt	
Usagi Yojimbo v. 3 (Dark Horse)	issue #45	Jan/2001	Grasscutter 2: Journey to Atsuta Shrine chapter 6 - In the Realm of Senses	
Usagi Yojimbo v. 3 (Dark Horse)	issue #46	Mar/2001	Showdown part 1	
Usagi Yojimbo v. 3 (Dark Horse)	issue #47	Apr/2001	Showdown part 2	
Usagi Yojimbo v. 3 (Dark Horse)	issue #48	May/2001	Escape!	featuring Chizu and the Neko Ninja
Usagi Yojimbo v. 3 (Dark Horse)	issue #49	Jun/2001	Three Seasons	
Usagi Yojimbo v. 3 (Dark Horse)	issue #50	Jul/2001	The Shrouded Moon part 1	
Usagi Yojimbo v. 3 (Dark Horse)	issue #51	Aug/2001	The Shrouded Moon part 2	
Usagi Yojimbo v. 3 (Dark Horse)	issue #52	Oct/2001	Kitsune's Tale	featuring Kitsune and Gennosuke
Usagi Yojimbo v. 3 (Dark Horse)	issue #53	Dec/2001	Vendetta	
Usagi Yojimbo v. 3 (Dark Horse)	issue #54	Jan/2002	The Return of The Lone Goat And Kid	featuring Lone Goat and Kid
Usagi Yojimbo v. 3 (Dark Horse)	issue #55	Feb/2002	Images From A Winter's Day	
Usagi Yojimbo v. 3 (Dark Horse)	issue #56	Apr/2002	Koji	
Usagi Yojimbo v. 3 (Dark Horse)	issue #57	May/2002	Crows part 1	
Usagi Yojimbo v. 3 (Dark Horse)	issue #58	Jun/2002	Crows part 2	
Usagi Yojimbo v. 3 (Dark Horse)	issue #59	Jul/2002	Crows part 3	
Usagi Yojimbo v. 3 (Dark Horse)	issue #60	Aug/2002	Duel at Kitanoji	
Usagi Yojimbo v. 3 (Dark Horse)	issue #61	Oct/2002	Out of the Shadows	
Usagi Yojimbo v. 3 (Dark Horse)	issue #62	Nov/2002	Ghost Warriors	
Usagi Yojimbo v. 3 (Dark Horse)	issue #63	Jan/2003	Komainu	
Usagi Yojimbo v. 3 (Dark Horse)	issue #64	Feb/2003	Tamago	
Usagi Yojimbo v. 3 (Dark Horse)	issue #65	Mar/2003	Usagi and the Tengu	
Usagi Yojimbo v. 3 (Dark Horse)	issue #66	May/2003	Sumi-e part 1	featuring Sasuké, Demon Queller
Usagi Yojimbo v. 3 (Dark Horse)	issue #67	Jun/2003	Sumi-e part 2	featuring Sasuké, Demon Queller
Usagi Yojimbo v. 3 (Dark Horse)	issue #68	Jul/2003	Sumi-e part 3	featuring Sasuké, Demon Queller
Usagi Yojimbo v. 3 (Dark Horse)	issue #69	Sep/2003	Fathers and Sons part 1	featuring Lone Goat and Kid
Usagi Yojimbo v. 3 (Dark Horse)	issue #70	Oct/2003	Fathers and Sons part 2	featuring Lone Goat and Kid
Usagi Yojimbo v. 3 (Dark Horse)	issue #71	Nov/2003	Bells	featuring Katsuichi Sensei
Usagi Yojimbo v. 3 (Dark Horse)	issue #72	Jan/2004	Kill the Geishu Lord	
Usagi Yojimbo v. 3 (Dark Horse)	issue #73	Feb/2004	The Pride of the Samurai	
Usagi Yojimbo v. 3 (Dark Horse)	issue #74	Mar/2004	Hokashi part 1	
Usagi Yojimbo v. 3 (Dark Horse)	issue #75	Apr/2004	Hokashi part 2	
Usagi Yojimbo v. 3 (Dark Horse)	issue #76	Jun/2004	Contraband	
Usagi Yojimbo v. 3 (Dark Horse)	issue #77	Jul/2004	After the Rat	An Inspector Ishida Mystery
Usagi Yojimbo v. 3 (Dark Horse)	issue #78	Aug/2004	Samurai for Hire	
Usagi Yojimbo v. 3 (Dark Horse)	issue #79	Oct/2004	Dreams and Nightmares	featuring Inazuma and Jei San
Usagi Yojimbo v. 3 (Dark Horse)	issue #79	Oct/2004	Gen and the Dog	featuring Gennosuke and Stray Dog
Usagi Yojimbo v. 3 (Dark Horse)	issue #80	Nov/2004	When Rabbits Fly	
Usagi Yojimbo v. 3 (Dark Horse)	issue #81	Jan/2005	Into The Mist	featuring Tomoe Ame
Usagi Yojimbo v. 3 (Dark Horse)	issue #81	Jan/2005	Nocturnal	featuring Sanshobo
Usagi Yojimbo v. 3 (Dark Horse)	issue #82	Mar/2005	Vendetta's End	
Usagi Yojimbo v. 3 (Dark Horse)	issue #83	Apr/2005	The Treasure of the Mother of the Mountains part 1	
Usagi Yojimbo v. 3 (Dark Horse)	issue #84	May/2005	The Treasure of the Mother of the Mountains part 2	
Usagi Yojimbo v. 3 (Dark Horse)	issue #85	Jun/2005	The Treasure of the Mother of the Mountains part 3	
Usagi Yojimbo v. 3 (Dark Horse)	issue #86	Aug/2005	The Treasure of the Mother of the Mountains part 4	
Usagi Yojimbo v. 3 (Dark Horse)	issue #87	Sep/2005	The Treasure of the Mother of the Mountains part 5	
Usagi Yojimbo v. 3 (Dark Horse)	issue #88	Oct/2005	The Treasure of the Mother of the Mountains part 6	
Usagi Yojimbo v. 3 (Dark Horse)	issue #89	Nov/2005	The Treasure of the Mother of the Mountains part 7	
Usagi Yojimbo v. 3 (Dark Horse)	issue #90	Jan/2006	The Ghost in the Well part 1	
Usagi Yojimbo v. 3 (Dark Horse)	issue #91	Feb/2006	The Ghost in the Well part 2	
Usagi Yojimbo v. 3 (Dark Horse)	issue #92	Mar/2006	The Thief and the Lotus Scroll	
Usagi Yojimbo v. 3 (Dark Horse)	issue #93	Apr/2006	Chanoyu	
Usagi Yojimbo v. 3 (Dark Horse)	issue #94	Jun/2006	Remnants of the Dead	
Usagi Yojimbo v. 3 (Dark Horse)	issue #95	Jul/2006	Shizukiri	
Usagi Yojimbo v. 3 (Dark Horse)	issue #96	Aug/2006	Boss Hamanaka’s Fortune part 1	
Usagi Yojimbo v. 3 (Dark Horse)	issue #97	Sep/2006	Boss Hamanaka’s Fortune part 2	
Usagi Yojimbo v. 3 (Dark Horse)	issue #98	Nov/2006	The Return of the Black Soul	
Usagi Yojimbo v. 3 (Dark Horse)	issue #99	Dec/2006	Bridge of Tears	
Usagi Yojimbo v. 3 (Dark Horse)	issue #100	Jan/2007	Centennial issue Celebrity Roast	
Usagi Yojimbo v. 3 (Dark Horse)	issue #101	Mar/2007	Fever Dream	
Usagi Yojimbo v. 3 (Dark Horse)	issue #102	Apr/2007	The Killer	
Usagi Yojimbo v. 3 (Dark Horse)	issue #103	May/2007	The Darkness and the Soul part 1	
Usagi Yojimbo v. 3 (Dark Horse)	issue #104	Jul/2007	The Darkness and the Soul part 2	
Usagi Yojimbo v. 3 (Dark Horse)	issue #105	Aug/2007	Sparrows part 1	
Usagi Yojimbo v. 3 (Dark Horse)	issue #106	Sep/2007	Sparrows part 2	
Usagi Yojimbo v. 3 (Dark Horse)	issue #107	Nov/2007	Sparrows part 3	
Usagi Yojimbo v. 3 (Dark Horse)	issue #108	Dec/2007	Sparrows part 4	
Usagi Yojimbo v. 3 (Dark Horse)	issue #109	Jan/2008	Sparrows part 5	
Usagi Yojimbo v. 3 (Dark Horse)	issue #110	Mar/2008	Kitsune Gari	
Usagi Yojimbo v. 3 (Dark Horse)	issue #111	Apr/2008	Sakura part 1	
Usagi Yojimbo v. 3 (Dark Horse)	issue #112	May/2008	Sakura part 2	
Usagi Yojimbo v. 3 (Dark Horse)	issue #113	Jul/2008	Snitch	
Usagi Yojimbo v. 3 (Dark Horse)	issue #114	Sep/2008	The Beggar	
Usagi Yojimbo v. 3 (Dark Horse)	issue #115	Oct/2008	The Fortress	
Usagi Yojimbo v. 3 (Dark Horse)	issue #116	Dec/2008	The Outlaw	
Usagi Yojimbo v. 3 (Dark Horse)	issue #117	Jan/2009	Traitors of the Earth part 1	
Usagi Yojimbo v. 3 (Dark Horse)	issue #118	Feb/2009	Traitors of the Earth part 2	
Usagi Yojimbo v. 3 (Dark Horse)	issue #119	Mar/2009	Traitors of the Earth part 3	
Usagi Yojimbo v. 3 (Dark Horse)	issue #120	May/2009	What the Little Thief Heard	
Usagi Yojimbo v. 3 (Dark Horse)	issue #121	Jun/2009	The Hidden Fortress	
Usagi Yojimbo v. 3 (Dark Horse)	issue #122	Aug/2009	A Place to Stay	
Usagi Yojimbo v. 3 (Dark Horse)	issue #123	Sep/2009	The Death of Lord Hikiji	
Usagi Yojimbo v. 3 (Dark Horse)	issue #124	Nov/2009	A Town Called Hell part 1	
Usagi Yojimbo v. 3 (Dark Horse)	issue #125	Dec/2009	A Town Called Hell part 2	
Usagi Yojimbo v. 3 (Dark Horse)	issue #126	Feb/2010	Nukekubi	
Usagi Yojimbo v. 3 (Dark Horse)	issue #127	Mar/2010	The Sword of Narukami	
Usagi Yojimbo v. 3 (Dark Horse)	issue #128	Apr/2010	Teru Teru Bozu	
Usagi Yojimbo v. 3 (Dark Horse)	issue #129	Jun/2010	Encounter at Blood Tree Pass	
Usagi Yojimbo v. 3 (Dark Horse)	issue #130	Jul/2010	Return to Hell part 1	
Usagi Yojimbo v. 3 (Dark Horse)	issue #131	Aug/2010	Return to Hell part 2	
Usagi Yojimbo v. 3 (Dark Horse)	issue #132	Oct/2010	Taiko part 1	
Usagi Yojimbo v. 3 (Dark Horse)	issue #133	Nov/2010	Taiko part 2	
Usagi Yojimbo v. 3 (Dark Horse)	issue #134	Dec/2010	Toad Oil	
Usagi Yojimbo v. 3 (Dark Horse)	issue #135	Feb/2011	The Return of the Lord of Owls	
Usagi Yojimbo v. 3 (Dark Horse)	issue #136	Mar/2011	Those Who Step on the Scorpion's Tail part 1	
Usagi Yojimbo v. 3 (Dark Horse)	issue #137	Apr/2011	Those Who Step on the Scorpion's Tail part 2	
Usagi Yojimbo v. 3 (Dark Horse)	issue #138	Jun/2011	Those Who Step on the Scorpion's Tail part 3	
Usagi Yojimbo v. 3 (Dark Horse)	issue #139	July/2011	Murder at the Inn part 1	An Inspector Ishida Mystery
Usagi Yojimbo v. 3 (Dark Horse)	issue #140	Aug/2011	Murder at the Inn part 2	An Inspector Ishida Mystery
Usagi Yojimbo v. 3 (Dark Horse)	issue #141	Oct/2011	Two Hundred Jizo	
Usagi Yojimbo v. 3 (Dark Horse)	issue #142	Nov/2011	The Ice Runners	
Usagi Yojimbo v. 3 (Dark Horse)	issue #143	Jan/2012	Shoyu part 1	
Usagi Yojimbo v. 3 (Dark Horse)	issue #144	Feb/2012	Shoyu part 2	
Usagi Yojimbo v. 3 (Dark Horse)	issue #145	May/2015	The Thief and the Kunoichi part 1	
Usagi Yojimbo v. 3 (Dark Horse)	issue #146	Jun/2015	The Thief and the Kunoichi part 2	
Usagi Yojimbo v. 3 (Dark Horse)	issue #147	Jul/2015	The Thief and the Kunoichi part 3	
Usagi Yojimbo v. 3 (Dark Horse)	issue #148	Sep/2015	The One-Armed Samurai	
Usagi Yojimbo v. 3 (Dark Horse)	issue #149	Oct/2015	The Distant Mountain	
Usagi Yojimbo v. 3 (Dark Horse)	issue #150	Nov/2015	Death of a Tea Master	
Usagi Yojimbo v. 3 (Dark Horse)	issue #151	Jan/2016	The Bride	
Usagi Yojimbo v. 3 (Dark Horse)	issue #152	Feb/2016	The River Rising	
Usagi Yojimbo v. 3 (Dark Horse)	issue #153	Mar/2016	Kyuri	
Usagi Yojimbo v. 3 (Dark Horse)	issue #154	May/2016	Kazehime	
Usagi Yojimbo v. 3 (Dark Horse)	issue #155	Jun/2016	The Secret of the Hell Screen part 1	An Inspector Ishida Mystery
Usagi Yojimbo v. 3 (Dark Horse)	issue #156	Jul/2016	The Secret of the Hell Screen part 2	An Inspector Ishida Mystery
Usagi Yojimbo v. 3 (Dark Horse)	issue #157	Aug/2016	The Secret of the Hell Screen part 3	An Inspector Ishida Mystery
Usagi Yojimbo v. 3 (Dark Horse)	issue #158	Oct/2016	The Fate of the Elders	
Usagi Yojimbo v. 3 (Dark Horse)	issue #159	Nov/2016	The Hatamoto’s Daughter	
Usagi Yojimbo v. 3 (Dark Horse)	issue #160	Dec/2016	Death by Fugu	An Inspector Ishida Mystery
Usagi Yojimbo v. 3 (Dark Horse)	issue #161	Sep/2017	The Body in the Library part 1	An Inspector Ishida Mystery
Usagi Yojimbo v. 3 (Dark Horse)	issue #162	Oct/2017	The Body in the Library part 2	An Inspector Ishida Mystery
Usagi Yojimbo v. 3 (Dark Horse)	issue #163	Nov/2017	Mouse Trap part 1	An Inspector Ishida Mystery
Usagi Yojimbo v. 3 (Dark Horse)	issue #164	Dec/2017	Mouse Trap part 2	An Inspector Ishida Mystery
Usagi Yojimbo v. 3 (Dark Horse)	issue #165	Dec/2017	Mouse Trap part 3	An Inspector Ishida Mystery
Usagi Yojimbo v. 3 (Dark Horse)	issue #166	Mar/2018	The Hidden part 1	
Usagi Yojimbo v. 3 (Dark Horse)	issue #167	Apr/2018	The Hidden part 2	
Usagi Yojimbo v. 3 (Dark Horse)	issue #168	May/2018	The Hidden part 3	
Usagi Yojimbo v. 3 (Dark Horse)	issue #169	Jun/2018	The Hidden part 4	
Usagi Yojimbo v. 3 (Dark Horse)	issue #170	Aug/2018	The Hidden part 5	
Usagi Yojimbo v. 3 (Dark Horse)	issue #171	Sep/2018	The Hidden part 6	
Usagi Yojimbo v. 3 (Dark Horse)	issue #172	Oct/2018	The Hidden part 7	

== IDW series ==
PUBLICATION	ISSUE #	DATE	STORY TITLE	NOTES
Usagi Yojimbo v. 4 (IDW)	issue #1	Jun/2019	Bunraku part 1	
Usagi Yojimbo v. 4 (IDW)	issue #2	Jul/2019	Bunraku part 2	
Usagi Yojimbo v. 4 (IDW)	issue #3	Aug/2019	Bunraku part 3	
Usagi Yojimbo v. 4 (IDW)	issue #4	Sep/2019	The Hero part 1	
Usagi Yojimbo v. 4 (IDW)	issue #5	Oct/2019	The Hero part 2	
Usagi Yojimbo v. 4 (IDW)	issue #6	Nov/2019	Adachi	An expanded color version of "The Goblin of Adachigahara".
Usagi Yojimbo v. 4 (IDW)	issue #7	Dec/2019	The Swords of the Higashi	
Usagi Yojimbo v. 4 (IDW)	issue #8	Feb/2020	Tatami part 1	
Usagi Yojimbo v. 4 (IDW)	issue #9	Mar/2020	Tatami part 2	
Usagi Yojimbo v. 4 (IDW)	issue #10	Jul/2020	Mon	
Usagi Yojimbo v. 4 (IDW)	issue #11	Aug/2020	The Return part 1	
Usagi Yojimbo v. 4 (IDW)	issue #12	Aug/2020	The Return part 2	
Usagi Yojimbo v. 4 (IDW)	issue #13	Sep/2020	The Return part 3	
Usagi Yojimbo v. 4 (IDW)	issue #14	Oct/2020	The Return part 4	
Usagi Yojimbo v. 4 (IDW)	issue #15	Nov/2020	Sojobo	
Usagi Yojimbo v. 4 (IDW)	issue #16	Dec/2020	Tengu War! part 1	
Usagi Yojimbo v. 4 (IDW)	issue #17	Feb/2021	Tengu War! part 2	
Usagi Yojimbo v. 4 (IDW)	issue #18	Mar/2021	Tengu War! part 3	
Usagi Yojimbo v. 4 (IDW)	issue #19	Apr/2021	The Master of Hebishima	
Usagi Yojimbo v. 4 (IDW)	issue #20	Jun/2021	Yukichi part 1	
Usagi Yojimbo v. 4 (IDW)	issue #21	Jul/2021	Yukichi part 2	
Usagi Yojimbo v. 4 (IDW)	issue #22	Sep/2021	Ransom! part 1	
Usagi Yojimbo v. 4 (IDW)	issue #23	Oct/2021	Ransom! part 2	
Usagi Yojimbo v. 4 (IDW)	issue #24	Sep/2021	Ransom! part 3	
Usagi Yojimbo v. 4 (IDW)	issue #25	Jan/2022	Crossroads part 1	
Usagi Yojimbo v. 4 (IDW)	issue #26	Feb/2022	Crossroads part 2	
Usagi Yojimbo v. 4 (IDW)	issue #27	Mar/2022	A Ghost Story	
Usagi Yojimbo v. 4 (IDW)	issue #28	May/2022	The Long Road	
Usagi Yojimbo v. 4 (IDW)	issue #29	Jul/2022	The Secret of the Green Dragon part 1	
Usagi Yojimbo v. 4 (IDW)	issue #30	Aug/2022	The Secret of the Green Dragon part 2	
Usagi Yojimbo v. 4 (IDW)	issue #31	Sep/2022	The Secret of the Green Dragon part 3	

== Limited Series ==
PUBLICATION	ISSUE #	DATE	STORY TITLE	NOTES
Usagi Yojimbo: Senso (Dark Horse)	issue #1	Aug/2014	Senso part 1	
Usagi Yojimbo: Senso (Dark Horse)	issue #2	Sep/2014	Senso part 2	
Usagi Yojimbo: Senso (Dark Horse)	issue #3	Oct/2014	Senso part 3	
Usagi Yojimbo: Senso (Dark Horse)	issue #4	Nov/2014	Senso part 4	
Usagi Yojimbo: Senso (Dark Horse)	issue #5	Dec/2014	Senso part 5	
Usagi Yojimbo: Senso (Dark Horse)	issue #6	Jan/2015	Senso part 6	

PUBLICATION	ISSUE #	DATE	STORY TITLE	NOTES
Teenage Mutant Ninja Turtles/Usagi Yojimbo: WhereWhen (IDW)	issue #1	Apr/2023	Senso part 1	Sequel to Teenage Mutant Ninja Turtles/Usagi Yojimbo. Prequel to Usagi Yojimbo: Senso.
Teenage Mutant Ninja Turtles/Usagi Yojimbo: WhereWhen (IDW)	issue #2	May/2023	Senso part 2	Sequel to Teenage Mutant Ninja Turtles/Usagi Yojimbo. Prequel to Usagi Yojimbo: Senso.
Teenage Mutant Ninja Turtles/Usagi Yojimbo: WhereWhen (IDW)	issue #3	May/2023	Senso part 3	Sequel to Teenage Mutant Ninja Turtles/Usagi Yojimbo. Prequel to Usagi Yojimbo: Senso.
Teenage Mutant Ninja Turtles/Usagi Yojimbo: WhereWhen (IDW)	issue #4	Jun/2023	Senso part 4	Sequel to Teenage Mutant Ninja Turtles/Usagi Yojimbo. Prequel to Usagi Yojimbo: Senso.
Teenage Mutant Ninja Turtles/Usagi Yojimbo: WhereWhen (IDW)	issue #5	Jul/2023	Senso part 5	Sequel to Teenage Mutant Ninja Turtles/Usagi Yojimbo. Prequel to Usagi Yojimbo: Senso.

PUBLICATION	ISSUE #	DATE	STORY TITLE	NOTES
Usagi Yojimbo: Ice and Snow (Dark Horse)	issue #1	Sep/2023	Ice and Snow part 1	
Usagi Yojimbo: Ice and Snow (Dark Horse)	issue #2	Nov/2023	Ice and Snow part 2	
Usagi Yojimbo: Ice and Snow (Dark Horse)	issue #3	Dec/2023	Ice and Snow part 3	
Usagi Yojimbo: Ice and Snow (Dark Horse)	issue #4	Jan/2024	Ice and Snow part 4	
Usagi Yojimbo: Ice and Snow (Dark Horse)	issue #5	Feb/2024	Ice and Snow part 5	

PUBLICATION	ISSUE #	DATE	STORY TITLE	NOTES
Usagi Yojimbo: The Crow (Dark Horse)	issue #1	Apr/2024	The Crow part 1	
Usagi Yojimbo: The Crow (Dark Horse)	issue #2	May/2024	The Crow part 2	
Usagi Yojimbo: The Crow (Dark Horse)	issue #3	Jun/2024	The Crow part 3	
Usagi Yojimbo: The Crow (Dark Horse)	issue #4	Jul/2024	The Crow part 4	
Usagi Yojimbo: The Crow (Dark Horse)	issue #5	Aug/2024	The Crow part 5	

PUBLICATION	ISSUE #	DATE	STORY TITLE	NOTES
Usagi Yojimbo: Ten Thousand Plums (Dark Horse)	issue #1	Mar/2025	Ten Thousand Plums part 1	
Usagi Yojimbo: Ten Thousand Plums (Dark Horse)	issue #2	Apr/2025	Ten Thousand Plums part 2	
Usagi Yojimbo: Ten Thousand Plums (Dark Horse)	issue #3	May/2025	Ten Thousand Plums part 3	
Usagi Yojimbo: Ten Thousand Plums (Dark Horse)	issue #4	Jun/2025	Tabo part 1	
Usagi Yojimbo: Ten Thousand Plums (Dark Horse)	issue #5	Jul/2025	Tabo part 2	

== One Shots ==
PUBLICATION	ISSUE #	DATE	STORY TITLE	NOTES
Usagi Yojimbo - Color Special (Dark Horse)	issue #4	Jul/1997	Green Persimmon	Originally published in twelve 2 page installments in Diamond Previews catalogues.

PUBLICATION	ISSUE #	DATE	STORY TITLE	NOTES
Usagi Yojimbo: Yokai (Dark Horse)	issue #1	Nov/2009	Yokai	Original Graphic Novel

PUBLICATION	ISSUE #	DATE	STORY TITLE	NOTES
Teenage Mutant Ninja Turtles/Usagi Yojimbo (IDW)	issue #1	Jul/2017	Namazu (or The Big Fish Story)	

PUBLICATION	ISSUE #	DATE	STORY TITLE	NOTES
Free Comic Book Day 2020: Usagi Yojimbo (IDW)	issue #1	Aug/2020	Attack of the Teenie Titans	

PUBLICATION	ISSUE #	DATE	STORY TITLE	NOTES
Usagi Yojimbo: Winter Special One-Shot (Dark Horse)	issue #1	Jan/2027	TBA	

== Short stories ==
PUBLICATION	ISSUE #	DATE	STORY TITLE	NOTES
Albedo Anthropomorphics v. 1 (Thoughts and Images)	issue #2	Nov/1984	Usagi Yojimbo	first appearance of Miyamoto Usagi later renamed The Goblin of Adachigahara
Albedo Anthropomorphics v. 1 (Thoughts and Images)	issue #3	Apr/1985	Lone Rabbit and Child part 1	first appearances of Tomoe Ame, Lord Noriyuki, and the Neko Ninja
Albedo Anthropomorphics v. 1 (Thoughts and Images)	issue #4	Jul/1985	Lone Rabbit and Child part 2	first appearances of Tomoe Ame, Lord Noriyuki, and the Neko Ninja
Critters (Fantagraphics)	issue #1	Jun/1986	Bounty Hunter	first appearance of Gennosuke Murakami
Critters (Fantagraphics)	issue #3	Aug/1986	Horse Thief	
Critters (Fantagraphics)	issue #6	Dec/1986	A Quiet Meal	
Critters (Fantagraphics)	issue #7	Jan/1987	Blind Swordspig	first appearance of Zato Ino
Critters (Fantagraphics)	issue #10	Mar/1987	Homecoming part 1	first appearances of Mariko, Kenichi, and Jotaro
Critters (Fantagraphics)	issue #11	Apr/1987	Homecoming part 2	first appearances of Mariko, Kenichi, and Jotaro
Critters (Fantagraphics)	issue #14	Jul/1987	Bounty Hunter 2	
Critters (Fantagraphics)	issue #23	Apr/1988	One Night in the Cold	
Critters (Fantagraphics)	issue #38	Jul/1989	The Tangled Skein	
Critters (Fantagraphics)	issue #50	Mar/1990	Yurei	
Doomsday Squad v. 2 (Fantagraphics)	issue #3	Oct/1986	Village of Fear	first Usagi Yojimbo story published in color
Turtle Soup (Mirage)	issue # 1	Sep/1987	Turtle Soup and Rabbit Stew	featuring Miyamoto Usagi and Leonardo
Shell Shock (Mirage)	issue #1	Dec/1989	The Treaty	featuring Miyamoto Usagi and Leonardo
Teenage Mutant Ninja Turtles (Mirage)	issue #47	May/1992	Hare Today, Hare Tomorrow	featuring Miyamoto Usagi and “Space” Usagi
Art of Usagi Yojimbo Radio Comix	issue #1	Apr/1997	The Courage of the Plum	featuring “Young” Usagi
Trilogy Tour 2 Cartoon Books	issue #1	Jun/1998	The Guardian	watercolor painted story
Dark Horse Presents.... v. 1 Dark Horse	issue #140	Feb/1999	Death and Taxes	
Dark Horse Presents.... Annual 1999 Dark Horse	issue #1	Aug/1999	A Funny Thing Happened on the Way to the Tournament	featuring “Young” Usagi
Wizard: The Comics Magazine Wizard Press	issue #97	Sep/1999	Netsuke	
Oni Double Feature Oni Press	issue #11	Feb/2000	The Leaping Ninja	
Dark Horse Extra Dark Horse	issue #20	Feb/2000	Tsuru part 1	
Dark Horse Extra Dark Horse	issue #21	Mar/2000	Tsuru part 2	
Dark Horse Extra Dark Horse	issue #22	Apr/2000	Tsuru part 3	
Dark Horse Extra Dark Horse	issue #23	May/2000	Tsuru part 4	
Nocturnals: Troll Bridge Oni Press	issue #1	Oct/2000	The Tanuki Daimyo's Candy	the “unofficial” title for the portion of the issue long story in which Usagi appears
Dark Horse Maverick 2001 Dark Horse	issue #1	Jul/2001	Usagi and the Kami of the Pond	featuring “Young” Usagi
Dark Horse Extra Dark Horse	issue #45	Mar/2002	A Lesson in Courtesy part 1	featuring “Young” Usagi
Dark Horse Extra Dark Horse	issue #46	Apr/2002	A Lesson in Courtesy part 2	featuring “Young” Usagi
Dark Horse Extra Dark Horse	issue #47	May/2002	A Lesson in Courtesy part 3	featuring “Young” Usagi
Dark Horse Extra Dark Horse	issue #48	Jun/2002	A Lesson in Courtesy part 4	featuring “Young” Usagi
More Fund Comics Sky Dog Press	issue #1	Sep/2003	Ninja Hunt	Benefit book for the Comic Book Legal Defense Fund
Drawing the Line benefit book to raise money for Princess Margaret Hospital and The Hospital for Sick Children, for cancer research	issue #1	May/2004	Cooking Lesson	featuring “Young” Usagi
MySpace Dark Horse Presents.... Dark Horse	issue #18	Jan/2009	Saya	
Free Comic Book Day 2009: Star Wars / Dark Horse All Ages Dark Horse	issue #1	May/2009	One Dark and Stormy Night	Free Comic Book Day release for 2009
MySpace Dark Horse Presents.... Dark Horse	issue #36	Jul/2010	Cut the Plum	
Dark Horse Presents.... v. 2 Dark Horse	issue #7	Dec/2011	Buntori	
Dark Horse Presents.... v. 2 Dark Horse	issue #35	Apr/2014	The Artist part 1	
Dark Horse Presents.... v. 2 Dark Horse	issue #36	May/2014	The Artist part 2	
The CBLDF Presents Liberty Annual 2014 Image Comics	issue #1	October/2014	Gagged	featuring Sasuké the Demon Queller
Usagi Yojimbo vol 32 TPB - Mysteries Dark Horse		Jul/2018	Chibi Usagi and the Big Bad Jei	
Usagi Yojimbo vol 32 TPB - Mysteries Dark Horse		Jul/2018	Chibi Usagi and the Goblin of Adachi Plain	
Usagi Yojimbo vol 33 TPB - The Hidden Dark Horse		Jul/2019	Chibi Tomoe and the Zo Junja	
Usagi Yojimbo - Color Classics Dark Horse	issue #1	Jan/2020	Funhouse	

== Space Usagi ==
PUBLICATION	ISSUE #	DATE	STORY TITLE	NOTES
Space Usagi v. 1 (Mirage)	issue #1	Jun/1992	Death and Honor part 1	
Space Usagi v. 1 (Mirage)	issue #2	Jul/1992	Death and Honor part 2	
Space Usagi v. 1 (Mirage)	issue #3	Aug/1992	Death and Honor part 3	

PUBLICATION	ISSUE #	DATE	STORY TITLE	NOTES
Space Usagi v. 2 (Mirage)	issue #1	Nov/1993	White Star Rising part 1	
Space Usagi v. 2 (Mirage)	issue #2	Jan/1994	White Star Rising part 2	
Space Usagi v. 2 (Mirage)	issue #3	Jan/1994	White Star Rising part 3	

PUBLICATION	ISSUE #	DATE	STORY TITLE	NOTES
Space Usagi v. 3 (Dark Horse)	issue #1	Jan/1996	Warrior part 1	
Space Usagi v. 3 (Dark Horse)	issue #2	Feb/1996	Warrior part 2	
Space Usagi v. 3 (Dark Horse)	issue #3	Mar/1996	Warrior part 3	

PUBLICATION	ISSUE #	DATE	STORY TITLE	NOTES
Space Usagi v. 4 (Dark Horse)	issue #1	Oct/2023	Yokai Hunter	full-color, one-shot

PUBLICATION	ISSUE #	DATE	STORY TITLE	NOTES
Space Usagi v. 5 (Dark Horse)	issue #1	Dec/2023	Death and Honor part 1	Reprints v. 1, now in color
Space Usagi v. 5 (Dark Horse)	issue #2	Jan/2024	Death and Honor part 2	
Space Usagi v. 5 (Dark Horse)	issue #3	Feb/2024	Death and Honor part 3	
