= Teenage Mutant Ninja Turtles (2003 TV series) season 3 =

Teenage Mutant Ninja Turtles
- Season 3
- No. of episodes: 26

Release
- Original network: 4Kids TV
- Original release: October 9, 2004 – April 23, 2005

Season chronology
- ← Previous; Season 2 Next → Season 4

The third season of Teenage Mutant Ninja Turtles originally aired between October 9, 2004, and April 23, 2005, beginning with the "Space Invaders, Part 1" episode. The entire season of the television series was released on DVD in seven volumes from March 15, 2005, through May 16, 2006. This is the only season of the 2003 series which has a prodcode, and included a Christmas episode under the title "The Christmas Aliens".

== Plot ==
The Triceraton Republic launches a massive invasion of Earth, believing Professor Honeycutt to be hiding on the planet. After wreaking havoc on the planet, they are convinced to leave by Donatello, who reveals Honeycutt's departure, only for Honeycutt to return to Earth, intending to surrender himself to the Triceratons. Honeycutt and the Turtles are abducted by the Earth Protection Force, led by Agent Bishop, who has allied with the Federation. While Traximus deposes Zanramon, Honeycutt sacrifices himself to upload a computer virus to the Triceraton and Federation fleet. Traximus jails Zanramon and Blanque and declares a new era of peace. Having observed the damage that has been done to Earth from the sidelines, Shredder uses his Oroku Saki persona to help in the reconstruction of New York, secretly salvaging Triceraton technology for an unknown purpose, while Bishop schemes to create an army of super-soldiers.

Splinter and the Turtles are visited by "Ultimate Drako", a fusion of Ue-Sama and Drako, who wield Lord Simultaneous' Time Scepter, and scatter the group across time and space. Michelangelo arrives in a world where the Turtles are superheroes fighting a villainous Splinter, Raphael enters the world of the Planet Racers franchise, Donatello suffers in an alternate timeline where Shredder has conquered the Earth, and Leonardo arrives in Miyamoto Usagi's dimension. With Usagi's help, Leo travels to the Battle Nexus and is able to reunite his brothers and Splinter and defeat Ultimate Drako. Though the duo is separated and Drako perishes, Ue-Sama is restored to a youthful form and reunited with his father.

After receiving a vision of Shredder departing Earth to conquer the Utrom home world, Splinter rallies the Turtles, Casey Jones, April O'Neil, Leatherhead, and Honeycutt (who were revealed to have survived their supposed deaths) to storm Shredder's stronghold on the eve of his departure in a massive spacecraft. Bishop also enters the fray with Stockman on his side, but Shredder is able to lift off with Karai and Dr. Chaplin, with the Turtles and Splinter stowing away. As Bishop continues to assault the ship in space, Shredder viciously wounds his foes, who decide to sacrifice their lives by detonating the ship's power core to kill Shredder. The Utroms arrive just in time to save them all and find Shredder guilty of numerous war crimes and atrocities, banishing him to a desolate asteroid.

== Cast ==
=== Main ===
- Michael Sinterniklaas as Leonardo: the leader of the Turtles who wields twin katana swords and a blue mask (appears in all 26 episodes)
- Sam Riegel as Donatello: the Turtles' genius engineer who is the primary source of their devices and vehicles who wields a bo staff and a purple mask (appears in all 26 episodes)
- Frank Frankson as Raphael: The most stubborn and temperamental of the four turtles who wields twin sai and a red mask (appears in all 26 episodes)
- Wayne Grayson as Michelangelo: the Turtles' and wise guy and a large source of comic relief who wields twin nunchucks and an orange mask (appears in all 26 episodes)

=== Supporting ===
- Darren Dunstan as Splinter: the Turtles' sensei and adopted father, who comes to realize his destiny as a guardian of the Utroms (21 episodes; has no lines in episode 2).
- Veronica Taylor as April: an ally of the Turtles who enters a relationship with Casey (14 episodes; has no lines in episodes 4 and 26).
- Marc Thompson as:
  - Casey: an ally of the Turtles who enters a relationship with April (15 episodes).
  - The Ultimate Daimyo: a warrior king who hosts a tournament of the multiverse's greatest warriors every 3 years.
- F.B. Owens as
  - Traximus: an honorable Triceraton gladiator the Turtles befriended in the previous season, now a leader of a rebel cell who seeks to dethrone Zanramon.
  - Leatherhead: a mutant alligator who is a loyal ally of the Turtles.
- Oliver Wyman as Honeycutt/Fugitoid: a Federation scientist whose mind was accidentally uploaded into an android's body, who possesses the plans for a teleportation device warred over by the Triceratons and Federation.
- Jason Griffith as Miyamoto Usagi: an ally of the Turtles whom Leonardo encounters during an impromptu visit to his dimension (3 episodes).
- Dan Green as Mortu: the leader of the Utroms.
- Liza Jacqueline as Renet: a time travelling apprentice who befriended the Turtles after accidentally arriving in their dimension and stopping Savanti Romero.
- Terrance Archie as Silver Sentry: the leader of the Justice Force and a friend of Michelangelo.
- Eric Stuart as Murakami Gennosuke: an ally of the Turtles whom Leonardo encounters during an impromptu visit to his dimension (2 episodes).
- Tara Sands as Angel: an ally of the Turtles who helped finding her brother.
- Sean Schemmel as Nobody: an superhero who befriend the Turtles.

=== Villains ===
- Scottie Ray as Ch'rell / Oroku Saki / Shredder: the main antagonist of the series and the leader of the Foot Clan, who uses his wealth to help repair New York for an ulterior motive (9 episodes).
- Karen Neill as Karai: Shredder's adopted daughter and second-in-command, whose allegiance and devoted service come into question, as Leonardo tries to convince her to change sides.
- Greg Carey as Hun: a hulking gangster who struggles to stay in Shredder's favor after several failures.
- Scott Williams as Baxter Stockman: a brilliant scientist who often attempts to sabotage Shredder for his own personal gain (8 episodes).
- Sam Riegel as Dr. Chaplin: a young scientist who threatens not only Stockman's place in the Foot hierarchy but his life as well.
- David Zen Mansley as:
  - John Bishop: a black ops agent in charge of the Earth Protection Force, an organization devoted to defending Earth from alien invasion.
  - Savanti Romero: a time travelling apprentice who was turned into a demon by lord Simultaneous and banished as punishment for trying to seize the time scepter.
- Michael Alston Bailey as Zanramon: the despotic Prime Leader of the Triceraton Republic who invades Earth to find Professor Honeycutt.
- Dan Green as Commander Mozar: a seasoned veteran who serves as Zanramon's second-in-command.
- Oliver Wyman as General Blanque: the leader of the Federation.
- Ted Lewis as Ue-Sama: a warrior prince who goes by the title "Ultimate Ninja", who merges with Drako and seeks vengeance on the Turtles.
- Marc Thompson as Drako: an enemy of Splinter who is merged with Ue-Sama and seeks revenge on him.
- Michael Sinterniklaas as Lord Hebi: an anthropomorphic snake.

== Crew ==
Teenage Mutant Ninja Turtles was produced by Mirage Studios, 4Kids Entertainment, 4Kids Productions, and Dong Woo Animation and distributed by 4Kids Entertainment and was aired on Fox's Saturday morning kids' block in the US. The producers were Gary Richardson, Frederick U. Fierst, and Joellyn Marlow for the American team; Tae Ho Han was the producer for the Korean team.

== Episodes ==
No. overall	No. in season	Title	Directed by	Written by	Original release date	Prod. code
53	1	"Space Invaders"	Roy Burdine	Dean Stefan	October 9, 2004	S03E02
54	2	"Space Invaders"	Roy Burdine	Eric Luke	October 16, 2004	S03E03
55	3	"Space Invaders"	Roy Burdine	Marty Isenberg	October 23, 2004	S03E04
Earth suddenly comes under attack when the Triceratons mount a surprise invasion. Following an energy trail from the transmat device, Prime Leader Zanramon is convinced that Professor Honeycutt resides on the planet and sends his forces to apprehend all people thought to have been in contact with the Fugitoid. The Turtles do their best to evade capture but come to the rescue of April and Casey when the two are taken captive and held at Central Park. The Turtles manage to free the prisoners and are successful in saving April and Casey, but Donatello gets captured by the Triceratons and taken to the Triceraton mothership. Prime Leader Zanramon questions Donatello concerning the whereabouts of the Fugitoid, but Don insists that the Fugitoid is no longer on Earth. The Triceraton leader continues to wreak havoc on Earth, levitating the city of Beijing into the stratosphere, and defeats the Justice Force after they were called to attack the Triceratons. Meanwhile, Donatello's brothers manage to steal a Triceraton ship and infiltrate their mothership but soon find themselves surrounded by a cadre of Triceratons in the sewers. The Triceratons surrounding the Turtles turn out to be a group of rebellious Triceratons led by Traximus, so Leonardo, Raphael, and Michelangelo form an alliance with them. The rebel leader wishes to overthrow Prime Leader Zanramon and reinstitute the representative government of the Triceraton Republic. With the rebel group, the Turtles seek to secure their brother, and sabotage the Prime Leader's attack on Earth. With the help of the rebels, the Turtles rescue Donatello and escape to Earth. The Triceratons scan for positrons and find nothing so they realize that the Fugitoid was not on Earth, but they find the teleportal trail of when the Fugitoid left Earth, so the Triceratons plot a new course for that planet. However at the end of the episode, the Fugitoid returns to Earth.
56	4	"Worlds Collide"	Roy Burdine	Ben Townsend	October 30, 2004	S03E05
57	5	"Worlds Collide"	Roy Burdine	Marty Isenberg	November 6, 2004	S03E06
58	6	"Worlds Collide"	Roy Burdine	Eric Luke	November 13, 2004	S03E07
Despite convincing the Triceratons that the Fugitoid has left Earth, the Turtles are dismayed to find that the Fugitoid has returned. Having erased any information on the Teleportal from his hard drive, he attempts to offer himself up to the Triceratons to encourage them to end their war against the D'Hoonib Republic. But the Turtles refuse to let their friend be captured. The Turtles and Professor Honeycutt are captured by the enigmatic government official Agent Bishop. Turning the Fugitoid over to General Blanque of D'Hoonib, Bishop performs medical experiments on the Turtles, which threaten to kill them. Splinter, April & Casey rescue the Turtles and Leatherhead from Bishop's clutches, and they all set off to find the Fugitoid. Meanwhile, Traximus and his rebel group attack the Triceraton Prime Leader, and the Fugitoid struggles to end the war between the Triceratons and the D'Hoonib Federation.
59	7	"Touch and Go"	Roy Burdine	Michael Ryan	November 20, 2004	S03E08
Raphael seeks shelter and learns a lesson in empathy when an angry mob looking for aliens chases him through the New York City alleys. Meanwhile, Splinter and Michelangelo battle two assassins possessing superhuman strength and superhuman speed abilities.
60	8	"Hunted"	Roy Burdine	Ben Townsend	November 27, 2004	S03E09
A big game hunter searches the sewers, seeking a giant crocodile rumored to live in them. He runs into an emotionally unstable Leatherhead, who has been living in the Turtles' lair.
61	9	"H.A.T.E."	Roy Burdine	Marty Isenberg	December 4, 2004	S03E10
The gang is relaxing in the countryside when their peace is shattered by some violent, alien-hating survivalists. Raphael and Donatello try to put a stop to them and deal with an atomic bomb, while April and Casey's relationship are put at risk by the arrival of Casey's overprotective mother.
62	10	"Nobody's Fool"	Roy Burdine	Greg Johnson	December 11, 2004	S03E11
Leonardo and Michelangelo meet up with caped crusader Nobody who has a history with the arms dealer Ruffington who unjustly disgraced him and is in league with the Purple Dragon, the Turtles attempt to help him out.
63	11	"The Lesson"	Roy Burdine	Michael Ryan	December 18, 2004	S03E13
April asks the Turtles to teach her martial arts, and they refuse, knowing that they could do more harm than good by training her without sufficient expertise. They tell her about the last time they tried to train a preteenage boy, back when the Turtles themselves were much younger.
64	12	"The Christmas Aliens"	Roy Burdine	Michael Ryan	December 25, 2004	S03E01
In a solo adventure, Mikey attempts to thwart the Purple Dragons in their attempt to steal a truck full of toys meant to be delivered to an orphanage for Christmas. He also comes across a stray kitten, which he adopts and names Klunk. At the lair, Splinter and the other Turtles plan a huge feast and invite all their friends.
65	13	"New Blood"	Roy Burdine	Marty Isenberg	January 22, 2005	S03E12
The Turtles explore a crashed Triceraton ship that was left in the Hudson River after the alien invasion. Here they encounter three "Karai-Bots" very dangerous robots designed by Baxter Stockman's overly enthusiastic young apprentice, Dr. Chaplin.
66	14	"The Darkness Within"	Roy Burdine	Ben Townsend	January 29, 2005	S03E14
Angel asks the Turtles to help her find her older brother, who went missing after exploring some tunnels under an old mansion. The Turtles venture in and encounter a disturbing centuries-old monster, which captures them and forces each Turtle to confront his greatest fear.
67	15	"Mission of Gravity"	Roy Burdine	Marty Isenberg	February 5, 2005	S03E15
The Turtles are overjoyed to encounter an old friend who they thought was dead, and they all set out to lower the floating city of Beijing back to the Earth's surface. Going against her adopted father's wishes, Karai turns to the Turtles for assistance, not wanting to have millions of innocent people perish. Meanwhile, Baxter Stockman, whose technological skills are at risk of being usurped, tries to get rid of Dr. Chaplin with Hun's help, who is just as determined to get rid of Karai due to her usurping his position in the Foot.
68	16	"The Entity Below"	Roy Burdine	Greg Johnson	February 12, 2005	S03E16
Much to Michelangelo's chagrin, the Turtles must venture back down to the underground city to investigate, after Donatello's crystals start glowing at the same time that massive earthquakes shake the world. But none of them are prepared for what they are about to learn about the Earth's history.
69	17	"Time Travails"	Roy Burdine	Bob Forward	February 19, 2005	S03E17
The Turtles become involved in a time-hopping adventure with the apprentice timestress Renet to foil the plans of the evil demon sorcerer Savanti Romero as he tries to escape his exile to the dark ages. After foiling the demon, the Turtles discover that Savanti's steed is Drako and the Ultimate Ninja fused into the Ultimate Drako who stole the Time Scepter and intends to use it to get revenge.
70	18	"Hun on the Run"	Roy Burdine	Michael Ryan	February 26, 2005	S03E18
Sent by Shredder to obtain a piece of alien technology held by the US government, Karai is captured by Agent Bishop who offers to return her in exchange for all the alien technology that Shredder has himself. Shredder instead sends the disgraced Hun to rescue the girl whom Hun despises. As if there was not enough dishonor among thieves, Stockman lures the Turtles into the battle as well.
71	19	"Reality Check"	Roy Burdine	Christopher Yost	March 5, 2005	S03E19
The Ultimate Drako arrive in the Turtles' lair with Lord Simultaneous's Time Scepter. Seeking vengeance, the monster separates the Turtles and Splinter across different aspects of reality. Michelangelo finds himself flung across the multiverse to a dream come true – a world where the Teenage Mutant Ninja Turtles are superheroes with amazing powers. His joy is ended abruptly when he finds out that Superturtles' archenemy Sliver, is their version of Splinter.
72	20	"Across the Universe"	Roy Burdine	Greg Johnson	March 12, 2005	S03E20
Raphael is hurdled through space to a planet where different alien species race huge motorcycles in high-stakes competitions. Raph joins in and tries to teach his companions how to race honorably.
73	21	"Same As It Never Was"	Roy Burdine	Michael Ryan	March 19, 2005	S03E21
Donatello is thrown forward in time into a dystopian future where Shredder controls all of Earth. Don must rejoin his emotionally hardened family and friends, who believe that he has been dead for thirty years, to plan a final attack on Shredder's headquarters to defeat him and the foot.
74	22	"The Real World"	Roy Burdine	Christopher Yost	March 26, 2005	S03E22
75	23	"The Real World"	Roy Burdine	Michael Ryan	April 2, 2005	S03E23
Leonardo finds himself sent across all the aspects of reality to a feudal Japan like dimension where he encounters anthropomorphic samurai animals, including his old friend, Usagi, and intends to help them against the evil Lord Hebi. Afterwards, Leonardo, hoping to find his family, travels with Usagi to the Battle Nexus to get help from the Daimyo, but it turns out that he has become old and broken, blaming Leonardo for the loss of his son due to the manipulations of Ultimate Drako as "Gyoji". They then claim the War Staff, trap Leonardo and Usagi in an arena with monsters, and proceed to slay both Daimyo and Splinter, but Ultimate Ninja's hesitation about hurting his father allows Splinter to use the staff and bring back his sons and together use the War Staff and Time Scepter to separate the two villains and destroy them. Lord Simultaneous arrives and uses his scepter to revive Daimyo's son as a young boy and send the Turtles and Splinter back home.
76	24	"Bishop's Gambit"	Roy Burdine	Greg Johnson	April 9, 2005	S03E24
Agent Bishop captures Splinter to extract some of his mutant rat DNA. The Turtles, Professor Honeycutt, and Leatherhead invade Bishop's laboratory and discover just how frightening Bishop's plans for the world's "safety" are.
77	25	"Exodus"	Roy Burdine	Christopher Yost	April 16, 2005	S03E25
78	26	"Exodus"	Roy Burdine	Greg Johnson	April 23, 2005	S03E26
Shredder prepares to leave the Earth and spread his plans of conquest and mass murder to other planets. As the citizens of New York City celebrate Shredder's monetary aid in repairing the city after the Triceraton invasion. The Turtles, knowing about Shredder's plan, with the help of their allies sneak into Shredder's headquarters to stop him from leaving the Earth, with Agent Bishop and the Earth Protection Force, who are in league with Baxter Stockman, seeking to discover his secrets. the Turtles and Splinter board Shredder's starship, which comes under attack from E.P.F at the same time. The Turtles go into the ship's power core to control it while contending with Karai and Shredder in a new exosuit. The Turtles and Splinter are defeated and decide to destroy the ship, but everyone on board is saved by the Utroms. Ch'rell stands trial for his crimes and is exiled to the ice asteroid Mor Gal Tal.
