= Samurai Rabbit: The Usagi Chronicles =

Animated action-comedy series

- Season 1 promotional poster, featuring the lead protagonist Yuichi Usagi
- Genre: Action; Comedy
- Based on: Usagi Yojimbo by Stan Sakai
- Developed by: Candie Kelty Langdale; Doug Langdale
- Voices of: Darren Barnet; Aleks Le; Shelby Rabara; Mallory Low
- Composer: Aiko Fukushima
- Countries of origin: United States; France
- Original language: English
- No. of seasons: 2
- No. of episodes: 20

Production
- Executive producers: Doug Langdale; Candie Kelty Langdale; Stan Sakai; Daniel Fujii; Nicolas Atlan; Sidonie Dumas; Terry Kalagian; Christophe Riandee; James Wan; Michael Clear; Rob Hackett; Mike Richardson; Keith Goldberg; Chris Tongue; Kristen Bell
- Producers: Judge Plummer; Kimberly Dennison; Alex Soto
- Editors: Aeolan Kelly; Joelle Kristy; Sachin Kurhade
- Running time: 24–26 minutes
- Production companies: Atomic Monster; Dark Horse Entertainment; Gaumont Animation; Netflix Animation Studios

Original release
- Network: Netflix
- Release: April 28 – September 1, 2022

Related
- Teenage Mutant Ninja Turtles

Samurai Rabbit: The Usagi Chronicles is an animated action comedy television series developed by Candie and Doug Langdale. The show is loosely based on the Usagi Yojimbo comic books by Stan Sakai. Unlike its source material where the comics takes place in the past, the show takes place in the future and Miyamoto Usagi is not the lead protagonist, the character instead appearing in a minor role, with Yuki Matsuzaki reprising his role from the 2012 Teenage Mutant Ninja Turtles series.

It was produced for Netflix Animation and Atomic Monster by Dark Horse Entertainment and Gaumont Animation, and premiered on Netflix on April 28, 2022. The second and final season was released on September 1, 2022.

== Synopsis ==
Samurai Rabbit: The Usagi Chronicles takes place in Neo Edo and centers on rabbit teenager Yuichi, who is the descendant of Miyamoto Usagi, and his group of eccentric companions (Gen, Kitsune and Chizu) while defending Neo Edo from the menace of Kagehito and the Yokai.

== Voice cast ==
=== Main ===
- Darren Barnet as Yuichi Usagi and Spot
- Aleks Le as Gen
- Shelby Rabara as Kitsune
- Mallory Low as Chizu

=== Villains ===
- Eric Bauza as Kagehito, Admiral Nochi, Sakuran, Chikabuma, O-Dokuro
- Mela Lee as Lady Fuwa, Warbotto
- SungWon Cho as Lord Kogane
- Keone Young as Hakai

=== Supporting ===
- Aleks Le as Mogura, Newsbotto, Keisatsukan 3, Bat 2
- Shelby Rabara as Mayumi, Person 4, and Kiyoko
- Mallory Low as Jihanki, Shiba Inu 1, 2 & 3
- SungWon Cho as Warimashi, Shiba Inu 2, Bat One and Head Keisatsukan
- Eric Bauza as Mechabuma, Street Tough 2, and Yabushito
- Mela Lee as Kaiyo, Toshiko, Fumiko, Hana, Kana, Supreme Commander, and Sawaguchi
- Keone Young as Tetsujin, Hakai, Bat 1, Person 2, and Keisatsu
- Sumalee Montano as Karasu-Tengu and Person 3

=== Minor ===
- Sumalee Montano as Auntie and Mochi-Loving Ninja
- Eric Bauza as Hat Yokai and Stool-Yokai
- Stephanie Sheh as Snarky Ninja Kid and Spunky Ninja Kid
- Yuki Matsuzaki as Miyamoto Usagi

== Episodes ==
=== Series overview ===
Season	Episodes	Originally released
1	10	April 28, 2022
2	10	September 1, 2022

=== Season 1 (2022) ===
No. overall	No. in season	Title	Directed by	Written by	Original release date
1	1	"The Big City"	Derek Lee Thompson	Candie Kelty Langdale & Doug Langdale	April 28, 2022
2	2	"Yokai"	Alfred Gimeno	Candie Kelty Langdale & Doug Langdale	April 28, 2022
3	3	"Possessions"	Derek Lee Thompson	Candie Kelty Langdale & Doug Langdale	April 28, 2022
4	4	"Run Rabbit Run"	Alfred Gimeno	Charlotte Wilson Langley	April 28, 2022
5	5	"Common Sensei"	Derek Lee Thompson	Gene Grillo	April 28, 2022
6	6	"Nobody Likes A Ninja"	Alfred Gimeno	Matt Wayne	April 28, 2022
7	7	"Belly of the Beast"	Derek Lee Thompson	Jeffrey Reddick	April 28, 2022
8	8	"Go"	Alfred Gimeno	Candie Kelty Langdale & Doug Langdale	April 28, 2022
9	9	"Kagehito Unleashed"	Derek Lee Thompson	Gene Grillo	April 28, 2022
10	10	"Soul Oath"	Alfred Gimeno	Charlotte Wilson Langley	April 28, 2022

=== Season 2 (2022) ===
No. overall	No. in season	Title	Directed by	Written by	Original release date
11	1	"Runaway Training"	Derek Lee Thompson	Candie Kelty Langdale & Doug Langdale	September 1, 2022
12	2	"Game Dogs"	Alfred Gimeno	Chris Barger	September 1, 2022
13	3	"The Fuzzy Pony"	Derek Lee Thompson	Matt Wayne	September 1, 2022
14	4	"Adventures in Ninjasitting"	Alfred Gimeno	Jeffrey Reddick	September 1, 2022
15	5	"Interdimensionals"	Derek Lee Thompson	Gene Grillo	September 1, 2022
16	6	"Warbotto"	Alfred Gimeno	Charlotte Wilson Langley	September 1, 2022
17	7	"Willow Branch"	Derek Lee Thompson	Atsuko Tsuji	September 1, 2022
18	8	"The Chizu Stands Alone"	Alfred Gimeno	Matt Wayne	September 1, 2022
19	9	"Eggs!"	Derek Lee Thompson	Chris Barger	September 1, 2022
20	10	"Invasion!"	Alfred Gimeno	Jeffrey Reddick	September 1, 2022

== Production ==
The series was first announced in February 2018 that a CGI adaptation of the comics is in the works from Gaumont Animation. In mid-July 2020, Gaumont stated that the adaptation will be a series on Netflix under the title Samurai Rabbit: The Usagi Chronicles, in partnership with Netflix Animation. Production companies Atomic Monster and Dark Horse Entertainment are also involved with the series, with Mumbai-based studio 88 Pictures handling the CGI animation. Khang Le serves as art director.

Doug and Candie Langdale serve as show-runners as well as executive producers. At the virtual Comic-Con@Home event in July 2021, the show's main voice cast was revealed with Darren Barnet in the lead role of Yuichi Usagi. In April 2022, Yuki Matsuzaki announced that he would be reprising his role as Miyamoto Usagi, after previously voicing the character in the 2012 iteration of the Teenage Mutant Ninja Turtles animated series.

== Release ==
Samurai Rabbit: The Usagi Chronicles was released on April 28, 2022 on Netflix. A trailer was released on April 1.
