= Secret Origins (disambiguation) =

Secret Origins, may refer to:

- Secret Origins, a number of series and stories from DC Comics
  - Secret Files and Origins, the DC Comics title that continued the kinds of story feature in the original
- "Secret Origins" (Teenage Mutant Ninja Turtles (2003 TV series)), an episode of the Teenage Mutant Ninja Turtles animated TV series
- "Secret Origins" (Justice League), the first of the three-part Justice League TV series premiere
- Secret Origins (audio drama), a Doctor Who spin-off audio play
