= Yuki Matsuzaki =

Japanese actor (born 1981)

Yuki Matsuzaki 松崎 悠希
- Born: September 24, 1981 (age 45); Miyazaki, Japan
- Occupation: Actor
- Years active: 2002–present
- Website: www.yukimatsuzaki.com

Yuki Matsuzaki (松崎 悠希, Matsuzaki Yūki; born September 24, 1981) is a Japanese actor who has appeared in movies and on television.

Matsuzaki appeared in Clint Eastwood's Letters from Iwo Jima and in The Pink Panther 2 where he portrayed Kenji Mazuto, a technology "wiz-kid". He appeared in Pirates of the Caribbean: On Stranger Tides as a character named Garheng. He also starred in the film Man From Reno (2014). He is the voice of Miyamoto Usagi from the 2012 animated series adaptation of Teenage Mutant Ninja Turtles and the 2022 Netflix series Samurai Rabbit: The Usagi Chronicles.

== Filmography ==
=== Film ===
Year	Title	Role	Notes
2002	Red Herring	Hiroshi	Direct-to-video
2003	The Black Ninja	Shinji Hagiwara / Red Ninja	Direct-to-video
2003	Red Silence	Shuji Tsukamoto	Short film
2003	The Last Samurai	Soldier in Street #1	
2004	The New Adventures of Blonde Man: Rat Attack	The Rat	
2005	Drunken Sword	Bandit	Short film
2005	The New Adventures of Blonde Man: The Fashion Menace	The Rat	Short film
2005	Roku	Saizo	Short film
2006	Only the Brave	442 2nd Squad #5	
2006	The New Adventures of Blonde Man: The Main Event	The Rat	Short film
2006	French Bomber Detective	Ex Bum	Short film
2006	Letters from Iwo Jima	Nozaki	
2009	The Pink Panther 2	Kenji	
2009	The 8th Samurai	Yama-san	Short film
2010	How Do You Know	Tori	
2011	Pirates of the Caribbean: On Stranger Tides	Garheng	
2013	Mr. Rabbit	Kenichi	Short film
2013	Instant Mommy	Kaoru	
2014	Man From Reno	Tsubasa	
2015	Locksmiths	Tadashi	Short film
2015	Debris	Muramasa (voice)	Short film
2017	BraveStorm	Borg	
2018	Kimchi	Ken	Short film
2018	Othello-san	Yamada	Short film
2020	Last Three Days	Takeshi	
2022	Mosaic Street	Wakita	Short film
2022	Moon Manor	Hank Guto	
2023	Cottontail	Fishmonger	

=== Television ===
Year	Title	Role	Notes
2006	Heroes	Worker	Episode: "Chapter Ten 'Six Months Ago'"
2008	iGo to Japan	Taxi Driver	Television film
2009	Better Off Ted	Scientist #1	Episode: "Jabberwocky"
2010	Memphis Beat	Yoshi Yakamura	Episode: "It's All Right, Mama"
2011	Melissa & Joey	Toshi Kimura	Episode: "Lost in Translation"
2012	The Newsroom	Daisuke Tanaka	Episode: "Bullies"
2014	Ōoka Echizen	Tomekichi	Episode: "Chichi, Shirasu ni Zasu"
2015	The Man in the High Castle	Nakamura	2 episodes
2017	Teenage Mutant Ninja Turtles	Miyamoto Usagi (voice)	3 episodes
2019	We Bare Bears	Kenji Watanabe, Additional Voices (voices)	Episode: "Ramen"
2019	Sukatto Japan	Daigo Ohki	Episode: "Monstrous Newcomer Admits his Mistakes"
2019	The Lion Guard	Tenuk (voice)	Episode: "Mama Binturong"
2020	HodoBuzz	Tetsuya Shibata	6 episodes
2020	Glitch Techs	Anime Announcer (voice)	Episode: "The Real Glitch Techs"
2022	Samurai Rabbit: The Usagi Chronicles	Miyamoto Usagi (voice)	
2022	Oni: Thunder God's Tale	Tasaburo (voice)	
2023	Skull Island	Hiro (voice)	2 episodes
2026	Get Jiro	Hiroto (voice)	Episode: "Tokyo Story"

=== Video games ===
Year	Title	Role	Notes
2015	Call of Duty: Black Ops III	Additional Voices	
2016	Let It Die	Taro Gunkanyama	
2022	Teenage Mutant Ninja Turtles: Shredder's Revenge	Miyamoto Usagi (voice)	
2023	Wild Hearts	Ujishige Daidouji	
