= Teenage Mutant Ninja Turtles/Usagi Yojimbo =

Teenage Mutant Ninja Turtles/Usagi Yojimbo Comic

- Cover of Teenage Mutant Ninja Turtles/Usagi Yojimbo

Publication information
- Publisher: IDW Publishing
- Publication date: July 26, 2017
- No. of issues: 1
- Main characters: Miyamoto Usagi; Leonardo; Raphael; Donatello; Michelangelo

Creative team
- Written by: Stan Sakai
- Artist: Stan Sakai
- Letterer: Stan Sakai
- Colorist: Tom Luth

Teenage Mutant Ninja Turtles/Usagi Yojimbo is a one-shot crossover story re-uniting the Turtles franchise with Stan Sakai's Usagi Yojimbo, which also references Usagi's earlier encounters with the Mirage Turtles. Here, the Turtles must join forces with Miyamoto Usagi and the mystic Kakera against Usagi's sinister enemy Jei und Namazu. The issue was published in July 2017. It was followed by Teenage Mutant Ninja Turtles/Usagi Yojimbo: WhereWhen in 2023.

== Publication history ==
In April 2017, it was teased that Teenage Mutant Ninja Turtles will find their way into a one-shot crossover with the rabbit warrior Usagi Yojimbo in Summer One-Shot. The Teenage Mutant Ninja Turtles & Usagi Yojimbo one-shot was published on July 26, 2017, by IDW. The complete Usagi Yojimbo / Teenage Mutant Ninja Turtle story collection it was published on September 26, 2018, by Dark Horse Comics. IDW published the Teenage Mutant Ninja Turtles/Usagi Yojimbo: Expanded Edition on April 11, 2018.

== Follow-ups ==
=== Teenage Mutant Ninja Turtles/Usagi Yojimbo: WhereWhen ===
In December 2022, the planned publication of a five-issue crossover miniseries between IDW's Teenage Mutant Ninja Turtles and Usagi Yojimbo was announced, as a sequel to the 2017 crossover and an immediate chronological prelude to Usagi Yojimbo: Senso. The plot deals with the pursuit of the Turtles of a dangerous cyborg named Dr. WhereWhen, who flees into Miyamoto Usagi's reality to establish his own cybernetic empire. Originally set to be published in March 2023, the first issue was released in April the same year.
