= The Black Ninja =

- Directed by: Clayton Prince
- Written by: Clayton Prince
- Produced by: Parris Z. Moore
- Starring: Clayton Prince; Carla Brothers; Nicky DeMatteo; Yuki Matsuzaki; Heather Hunter; John Canada Terrell; Michael Chance
- Cinematography: Brendan Flynt
- Edited by: Michael Rector
- Production company: MTI Home Video
- Distributed by: MTI Home Video; Singa Home Entertainment
- Release date: January 14, 2003
- Running time: 91 minutes
- Country: United States
- Language: English

The Black Ninja is a 2003 American martial arts action film written, directed and starring Clayton Prince, and featuring Carla Brothers, Nicky DeMatteo, Yuki Matsuzaki, Heather Hunter, John Canada Terrell and Michael Chance. The film has been called a modern-day blaxploitation film, and it received very poor reviews from critics. After a limited theatrical release, it was released on DVD and distributed worldwide in January 2003.

== Plot ==
Maliq Ali is a defense attorney whose guilt over freeing guilty criminals, and the death of his family, leads him to become a costumed ninja vigilante who stalks these same criminals at night. After refusing to defend Tony Fanelli, a small-time mobster accused of murder, he finds himself involved in protecting the only witness, Tracey Allen, from Fanelli's hired thugs. While protecting this young woman, he is confronted by The Red Ninja, a Japanese assassin, who years before killed his family rather than pay Ali for defending him.

== Cast ==
- Clayton Prince as Maliq Ali and The Black Ninja
- Carla Brothers as Tracey Allen
- Nicky DeMatteo as Tony Fanelli
- Yuki Matsuzaki as Shinji Hagiwara and The Red Ninja
- Heather Hunter as Patty Ali
- John Canada Terrell as Mr. Fanelli's Lawyer
- Michael Chance as Detective Howell

== Production ==
Primarily financed by Clayton Prince, filming began in Philadelphia, Pennsylvania and ended after two weeks. An hour-long "Making of" documentary was produced and included on the DVD following its release.

== Reception ==
The Black Ninja was given a limited theatrical release on November 2, 2002, and distributed worldwide on DVD on January 14, 2003. The film was heavily criticized for its apparent lack of martial arts choreography and generally poor quality of the story, acting and cinematography. Critics said that the rush to finish the film drastically affected its overall quality, much of which could have been cleaned up post-production editing, leaving it looking "unfinished and more like an amateur, student film".

== Sources ==
- Pollard, Mark (November 8, 2007). "REVIEW: 'The Black Ninja' (2003)". Reviews. KungFuCinema.com. Archived from the original on June 29, 2010.
- Thornett, Eric. "Reviews: The Black Ninja". Reviews. b-independent.com.
- "Wild Realm Reviews: The Black Ninja". Film Reviews. WeirdWildRealm.com.
- https://web.archive.org/web/20120508075915/http://redlettermedia.com/half-in-the-bag/whats-your-number-and-the-black-ninja/ What's Your Number and the Black Ninja
