= Usagi Yojimbo =

Comic book series by Stan Sakai

- Usagi Yojimbo, Book 1: The Ronin

Publication information
- Publisher: Dark Horse Comics; Thoughts and Images; Fantagraphics Books; Mirage Studios; Radio Comix; IDW Publishing; Dogu Publishing
- Format: Ongoing series
- Genre: Historical; Action; Fantasy
- Publication date: 1984–present
- No. of issues: 165 (219 overall as of December 2016)

Creative team
- Written by: Stan Sakai
- Artist: Stan Sakai

Collected editions
- The Ronin: ISBN 0-930193-35-0

Usagi Yojimbo (兎用心棒, Usagi Yōjinbō; "rabbit bodyguard") is a comic book series written and illustrated by Stan Sakai. It is set primarily at the beginning of the Edo period of Japanese history and features anthropomorphic animals in place of humans. The main character is a rabbit rōnin, Miyamoto Usagi, whom Sakai based partially on the famous swordsman Miyamoto Musashi. Usagi wanders the land on a musha shugyō (a warrior's pilgrimage), occasionally selling his services as a bodyguard.

Usagi Yojimbo is heavily influenced by Japanese cinema; it has included references to the work of Akira Kurosawa (the title of the series is derived from Kurosawa's 1961 film Yojimbo), as well as to icons of Japanese pop culture, such as Lone Wolf and Cub, Zatoichi, and Godzilla. The series is also partially influenced by Groo the Wanderer by Sergio Aragonés (Sakai is the letterer for that series), but the overall tone of Usagi Yojimbo is more serious and reflective. The series follows the standard traditional Japanese naming-convention for all featured characters: their family names come before their given names.

The books are primarily episodic but occasionally featured underlying interconnected plots that form long extended storylines, though there are some novel-length narratives. The stories include many references to Japanese history and folklore, and sometimes include mythical creatures. The architecture, clothes, weapons and other objects are drawn with a faithfulness to the period's style. There are often stories with the purpose to illustrate various elements of Japanese arts and crafts, such as the fashioning of kites, swords, and pottery. Those efforts have been successful enough for the series to be awarded a Parents' Choice Award in 1990 for its educational value through Sakai's "skillful weaving of facts and legends into his work."

Usagi Yojimbo debuted in Albedo Anthropomorphics #2, published by Thoughts and Images in November 1984. Early positive reviews and an advertisement in Bud Plant's Spring Catalog in 1985 helped propel the series' popularity. Sakai accepted an offer to move the titular character to Fantagraphics Books, where he appeared in several issues of the new anthropomorphic anthology series Critters. Usagi's popularity influenced Fantagraphics to then release the Usagi Yojimbo Summer Special in October 1986 and then to give the titular character his own ongoing series, with issue #1 being published in July 1987. Usagi was named the 31st-greatest comic book character by Empire magazine and was ranked 92nd in IGN's list of the top 100 comic book heroes. Rolling Stone ranked Usagi Yojimbo number 43 in their list of the "50 Best Non-Superhero Graphic Novels".

== Publishing history ==
Sakai originally planned for Usagi and other characters to be human in stories explicitly modeled after the life of Miyamoto Musashi. However, once as Sakai was idly doodling, he drew rabbit ears tied in a topknot on his proposed hero and was pleased by the distinctive image. Usagi was first conceived as a supporting character in The Adventures of Nilson Groundthumper and Hermy, a brief series that predates Usagi Yojimbo. Sakai expanded on the idea of a rabbit samurai and his world took on an anthropomorphized cartoon nature, creating a fantasy setting which suited his dramatic needs with a unique look he thought could attract readers.

Usagi first appeared in the anthology Albedo Anthropomorphics in 1984, and later in the Fantagraphics Books anthropomorphic anthology Critters, before appearing in his own series in 1987. The Usagi Yojimbo series has been published by four different companies. The first publisher was Fantagraphics (volume one; 38 regular issues, plus one Summer Special and three Color Specials). The second was Mirage Comics (volume two; 16 issues). The third was Dark Horse Comics (volume three, 172 regular issues and two Color Specials), which also published the Senso miniseries (2015), The Art of Usagi Yojimbo: 20th Anniversary Edition (2004), and Usagi Yojimbo: 35 Years of Covers (2018), as well as republishing the Fantagraphics and Mirage series. The fourth is IDW Publishing, (volume four, 31 issues), which also republished select Fantagraphics story portions as Usagi Yojimbo Color Classics. Usagi returned to Dark Horse in September 2023, collaborating with Dogu Publishing. Another publisher, Radio Comix, published two issues of The Art of Usagi Yojimbo (1997–1998) which contained a selection of unpublished drawings, convention sketches, and other miscellaneous Usagi Yojimbo artwork (including an original short story in the first issue).

Because Usagi Yojimbo is a creator-owned comic and Sakai has complete and sole ownership of the character, Miyamoto Usagi has been able to appear in occasional short stories published by companies other than the one currently publishing his series. Usagi has appeared in stories published by Cartoon Books, Oni Press, Sky Dog Press, Wizard Press, and most recently in the benefit book Drawing the Line, the proceeds of which went to Princess Margaret Hospital and The Hospital for Sick Children, both in Toronto, for cancer research.

Sakai has experimented with formats for Usagi Yojimbo, such as when he published the color story "Green Persimmon" first as twelve separate 2-page chapters serialized in Diamond Comic Distributor's monthly catalog Previews. He has also serialized two short stories in a comic strip format in the tabloid-size promotional publication Dark Horse Extra. Usagi Yojimbo stories have also been created as both single-page "gag" stories and as multi-issue epic adventures.

Usagi has also appeared several times in Teenage Mutant Ninja Turtles (the comic, three of the animated series, and their respective toy lines), and the Turtles have appeared in Usagi Yojimbo as well. In the 1987 series, "Usagi Yojimbo" is incorrectly used as his actual name, but in the 2003 series, where he appeared far more frequently, he was referred to correctly as Miyamoto Usagi. He was even joined by Gen and other characters from his stories in his guest appearances in the 2003 series. Usagi's first appearance in the 2012 series was the fifth-season episode, "Yojimbo", which was written by Sakai. In his guest appearances, he is closest to Leonardo, both sharing the same ideals and code of ethics. The comics version also makes several pun references to Sergio Aragonés' Groo the Wanderer, in whose publication Sakai was also involved.

In addition, Sakai created a limited spin off series called Space Usagi, who first appeared in Amazing Heroes 187. It featured characters similar to those in the original series, including a descendant of Miyamoto Usagi, but set in a futuristic setting that also emulated feudal Japan in political and stylistic ways. Four mini-series of three issues each and two short stories featuring the characters were produced. Sakai has announced tentative plans to produce a fourth Space Usagi miniseries, but nothing has been announced yet. A one-shot crossover between the contemporary Usagi Yojimbo (Volume 4) series and Space Usagi, titled Space Usagi: Yokai Hunter, was released on October 11, 2023.

In the summer of 2014, Sakai, after a two-year hiatus, returned with a six-issue mini-series entitled Usagi Yojimbo: Senso. Senso, Japanese for "war", refers to The War of the Worlds, H. G. Wells's novel about Martians invading Earth. Senso tells the story of Martians invading Japan roughly twenty years after the events of the main series of Usagi Yojimbo, and also forms a plot bridge to the previously published Space Usagi.

In May 2015, Sakai returned to Usagi Yojimbo with the release of the 145th issue.

On February 22, 2019, The New York Times reported that IDW Publishing would present a new monthly Usagi Yojimbo series, in color (provided by Tom Luth for the first time). The new series opens up with a short story arc about the Japanese puppetry art of bunraku. Additionally, new full-color collections of earlier issues are planned. IDW published volume 4 of the series up until issue 31, published in 2022. Sakai returned the series to Dark Horse under his own new imprint, Dogu Publishing. The series was relaunched at Dark Horse with Usagi Yojimbo: Ice and Snow #1, the first in a five issue mini-series.

In July 2017, the traditional crossovers between Usagi Yojimbo and the Teenage Mutant Ninja Turtles franchise — at that time also part of IDW's publishing program — were resumed with a one-shot comic titled Teenage Mutant Ninja Turtles/Usagi Yojimbo. In April 2023, publication was started on the five-issue miniseries Teenage Mutant Ninja Turtles/Usagi Yojimbo: WhereWhen, which is an immediate prelude to Senso and once again co-stars the Ninja Turtles.

In 2024, Boom Studios and Dark Horse Comics published a one-shot crossover featuring Usagi meeting the Mighty Morphin Power Rangers.

In 2026, a new spin-off series, Usagi Yojimbo: Kaitō '84 was launched. This five-issue series is the first Usagi Yojimbo comic to be written and drawn by someone other than Stan Sakai. If features a descendent of Usagi's, set in 1984, and is written by Zack Rosenberg and illustrated by Jared Cullum (Kodi, Wonder City).

== In other media ==
=== Television ===
Usagi first appeared in episodes 32 and 34 in the third season of the 1987 Teenage Mutant Ninja Turtles animated series. He next appeared in episodes 23–26 in the second season of the 2003 Teenage Mutant Ninja Turtles animated series for an interdimensional tournament against the Turtles (along with Gen). He and Gen showed up again in episodes 1 and 22–23 of season 3 for a Christmas party and a continuation of the second-season storyline (which prominently featured his world and characters), respectively. Usagi again appeared in episode 13 of season 4 ("Samurai Tourist") for a confrontation with Leonardo, although the focus was mainly on Gen. Usagi and Gen also attended the wedding of April O'Neil and Casey Jones in episode 13 of season 7 (Back to the Sewer) titled "Wedding Bells and Bytes". He becomes one of their greatest inter-dimensional allies and especially closest to Leonardo.

In September 2016, an appearance of Usagi was also announced for the 2012 CGI series of Teenage Mutant Ninja Turtles. He appears in the fifth season (which is titled Tales of the Teenage Mutant Ninja Turtles) in the episodes "Yojimbo", "Osoroshi no Tabi", and "Kagayake! Kintaro", where the Turtles are hurled into his dimension, and teamed up to save a child he protects from ancient evil.

On February 8, 2018, it was announced that a CGI adaptation of the comics is in the works from Gaumont Animation. On July 15, 2020, Gaumont announced that the series would be released worldwide exclusively on Netflix under the title Samurai Rabbit: The Usagi Chronicles, in partnership with Netflix Animation. Production companies Atomic Monster and Dark Horse Entertainment are also partnering with Gaumont, with Mumbai-based studio 88 Pictures handling the CGI animation. Doug and Candie Langdale serve as show-runners on the series. The series takes place in Neo Edo in the 26th century and centers on rabbit teenager Yuichi Usagi (voiced by Darren Barnet), who is the descendant of Miyamoto Usagi. The show premiered on April 28, 2022 and concluded on September 1.

=== Video games ===
A Samurai Warrior: The Battles of Usagi Yojimbo video game was released for the Commodore 64, ZX Spectrum and Amstrad CPC in 1988 by Firebird.

Usagi appears as a playable character in the Dimension Shellshock downloadable content for Teenage Mutant Ninja Turtles: Shredder's Revenge, released on August 31, 2023.

== Collections and graphic novels ==
=== Numbered volumes ===
- Book 1: The Ronin (1987, Fantagraphics) – collects stories from Albedo Anthropomorphics #2, 3, and 4; Usagi Yojimbo: Summer Special #1; The Doomsday Squad #3; and Critters #1, 3, 6, 7, 10, 11, and 14
- Book 2: Samurai (1989, Fantagraphics) – collects Usagi Yojimbo (vol. 1) #1–6
- Book 3: Wanderer's Road (1989, Fantagraphics) – collects Usagi Yojimbo (vol. 1) #7–12 and a story from Turtle Soup (vol. 1) #1
- Book 4: Dragon Bellow Conspiracy (1991, Fantagraphics) – collects Usagi Yojimbo (vol. 1) #13–18
- Book 5: Lone Goat and Kid (1992, Fantagraphics) – collects Usagi Yojimbo (vol. 1) #19–24
- Book 6: Circles (1994, Fantagraphics) – collects Usagi Yojimbo (vol. 1) #25–31 and a story from Critters #50
- Book 7: Gen's Story (1996, Fantagraphics) – collects Usagi Yojimbo (vol. 1) #32–38 and a story from Critters #38
- Book 8: Shades of Death (1997, Dark Horse) – collects Usagi Yojimbo (vol. 2) #1–6 and stories from #7–8
- Book 9: Daisho (1998, Dark Horse) – collects Usagi Yojimbo (vol. 2) #7–12 and 14
- Book 10: The Brink of Life and Death (1998, Dark Horse) – collects Usagi Yojimbo (vol. 2) #13 and 15–16 and Usagi Yojimbo (vol. 3) #1–6
- Book 11: Seasons (1999, Dark Horse) – collects Usagi Yojimbo (vol. 3) #7–12 and Usagi Yojimbo Color Special: Green Persimmon #1, and stories from Usagi Yojimbo Roleplaying Game and The Art of Usagi Yojimbo #1
- Book 12: Grasscutter (1999, Dark Horse) – collects Usagi Yojimbo (vol. 3) #13–22
- Book 13: Grey Shadows (2000, Dark Horse) – collects Usagi Yojimbo (vol. 3) #23–30
- Book 14: Demon Mask (2001, Dark Horse) – collects Usagi Yojimbo (vol. 3) #31–38 and stories from Dark Horse Presents (vol. 1) #140, Dark Horse Presents Annual #3, Wizard magazine #97, Oni Double Feature #11, and Dark Horse Extra #20–23
- Book 15: Grasscutter II – Journey to Atsuta Shrine (2002, Dark Horse) – collects Usagi Yojimbo (vol. 3) #39–45
- Book 16: The Shrouded Moon (2003, Dark Horse) – collects Usagi Yojimbo (vol. 3) #46–52
- Book 17: Duel at Kitanoji (2003, Dark Horse) – collects Usagi Yojimbo (vol. 3) #53–60 and stories from Dark Horse Extra #45–48
- Book 18: Travels with Jotaro (2004, Dark Horse) – collects Usagi Yojimbo (vol. 3) #61–68
- Book 19: Fathers and Sons (2005, Dark Horse) – collects Usagi Yojimbo (vol. 3) #69–75
- Book 20: Glimpses of Death (2006, Dark Horse) – collects Usagi Yojimbo (vol. 3) #76–82 and a story from Drawing the Line
- Book 21: The Mother of Mountains (2007, Dark Horse) – collects Usagi Yojimbo (vol. 3) #83–89
- Book 22: Tomoe's Story (2008, Dark Horse) – collects Usagi Yojimbo (vol. 3) #90–93 and stories from Usagi Yojimbo Color Special #1–3
- Book 23: Bridge of Tears (2009, Dark Horse) – collects Usagi Yojimbo (vol. 3) #94–102
- Book 24: Return of the Black Soul (2010, Dark Horse) – collects Usagi Yojimbo (vol. 3) #103–109 and a story from Free Comic Book Day: Star Wars / Dark Horse All Ages #1
- Book 25: Fox Hunt (2011, Dark Horse) – collects Usagi Yojimbo (vol. 3) #110–116 and a story from MySpace Dark Horse Presents #18
- Book 26: Traitors of the Earth (2012, Dark Horse) – collects Usagi Yojimbo (vol. 3) #117–123 and stories from Dark Horse Maverick 2001 #1 and MySpace Dark Horse Presents #35
- Book 27: A Town Called Hell (2013, Dark Horse) – collects Usagi Yojimbo (vol. 3) #124–131
- Book 28: Red Scorpion (2014, Dark Horse) – collects Usagi Yojimbo (vol. 3) #132–138
- Book 29: Two Hundred Jizo (2015, Dark Horse) – collects Usagi Yojimbo (vol. 3) #139–144 and stories from Dark Horse Presents (vol. 2) #7 and 35–36
- Book 30: Thieves and Spies (2016, Dark Horse) – collects Usagi Yojimbo (vol. 3) #145–151
- Book 31: The Hell Screen (2017, Dark Horse) – collects Usagi Yojimbo (vol. 3) #152–158
- Book 32: Mysteries (2018, Dark Horse) – collects Usagi Yojimbo (vol. 3) #159–165
- Book 33: The Hidden (2019, Dark Horse) – collects Usagi Yojimbo: The Hidden #1–7 (vol. 3, #166–172)
- Book 34: Bunraku and Other Stories (2020, IDW) – collects Usagi Yojimbo (vol. 4) #1–7
- Book 35: Homecoming (2021, IDW) – collects Usagi Yojimbo (vol. 4) #8–14
- Book 36: Tengu War! (2022, IDW) – collects Usagi Yojimbo (vol. 4) #15–21
- Book 37: Crossroads (2022, IDW) – collects Usagi Yojimbo (vol. 4) #22–26
- Book 38: The Green Dragon (2023, IDW) – collects Usagi Yojimbo (vol. 4) #27–31
- Book 39: Ice and Snow (2024, Dark Horse) – collects Usagi Yojimbo: Ice and Snow #1–5
- Book 40: The Crow (2025, Dark Horse) – collects Usagi Yojimbo: The Crow #1–5
- Book 41: Ten Thousand Plums (2025, Dark Horse) – collects Usagi Yojimbo: Ten Thousand Plums #1–5

=== Omnibus collections ===
- Usagi Yojimbo: The Special Edition (2009, Fantagraphics) – collects books #1–7
- The Usagi Yojimbo Saga
  - Volume 1 (2014, Dark Horse) – collects books #8–10
  - Volume 2 (2015, Dark Horse) – collects books #11–13
  - Volume 3 (2015, Dark Horse) – collects books #14–16
  - Volume 4 (2015, Dark Horse) – collects books #17–19
  - Volume 5 (2015, Dark Horse) – collects books #20–22
  - Volume 6 (2016, Dark Horse) – collects books #23–25
  - Volume 7 (2016, Dark Horse) – collects books #26–28
  - Volume 8 (2019, Dark Horse) – collects books #29–31
  - Volume 9 (2021, Dark Horse) – collects books #32–33 and Usagi Yojimbo/Teenage Mutant Ninja Turtles: The Complete Collection
  - Legends (2017, Dark Horse) – collects Space Usagi (1998), Usagi Yojimbo: Yokai, Usagi Yojimbo: Senso, and a story from CBLDF Liberty Annual 2014 #1

=== Other collections and graphic novels ===
- Usagi Yojimbo: Yokai (2009, Dark Horse) – original graphic novel
- Usagi Yojimbo: Senso (2015, Dark Horse) – collects Usagi Yojimbo: Senso #1–6
- Chibi Usagi
  - Chibi Usagi: Attack of the Heebie Chibis (2021, IDW) – original graphic novel, co-authored and illustrated by Julie Fujii Sakai, and collects a story from Usagi Yojimbo FCBD 2020
  - Chibi Usagi: Attack of the Heebie Chibis – Expanded Edition (2025, Dark Horse) – includes material from original publication in addition to other short stories
- Space Usagi
  - Space Usagi (1998, Dark Horse) – collects Space Usagi (vol. 1, 1992) #1–3, Space Usagi (vol. 2, 1993) #1–3, and Space Usagi (vol. 3, 1996) #1–3, and stories from Usagi Yojimbo Color Special #3 (1992) and Teenage Mutant Ninja Turtles (vol. 1) #47 (May 1992)
  - Space Usagi: Death and Honor (2024, Dark Horse) – collects Space Usagi: Death and Honor #1–3 (a color version of Space Usagi vol. 1) and Space Usagi: Yokai Hunter #1
  - Space Usagi: White Star Rising (2025, Dark Horse) – collects Space Usagi: White Star Rising #1–3 (a color version of Space Usagi vol. 2)
- Teenage Mutant Ninja Turtles crossovers
  - Usagi Yojimbo/Teenage Mutant Ninja Turtles: The Complete Collection (2018, Dark Horse) – collects stories from Turtle Soup #1, Usagi Yojimbo (vol. 3) #10, Shell Shock, Usagi Yojimbo (vol. 2) #1–3, and Teenage Mutant Ninja Turtles/Usagi Yojimbo, in the Saga trade dress
  - Teenage Mutant Ninja Turtles/Usagi Yojimbo: WhereWhen (2023, IDW) – collects Teenage Mutant Ninja Turtles/Usagi Yojimbo: WhereWhen #1–5

=== Origins collections ===
The Usagi Yojimbo Origins series collects color reprints of stories originally published in black and white.

- Volume 1: Samurai (2021, IDW) – collects Usagi Yojimbo Color Classics #1–7, which contains stories originally published in Usagi Yojimbo (vol. 1) #1–4 and 6, Critters #6 and 7, and Albedo Anthropomorphics #3–4
- Volume 2: Wanderer's Road (2021, IDW) – collects Usagi Yojimbo: Wanderer's Road #1–7, which contains stories originally published in Usagi Yojimbo (vol. 1) #7–14
- Volume 3: The Dragon Bellow Conspiracy (2022, IDW) – collects Usagi Yojimbo: The Dragon Bellow Conspiracy #1–6, which contains stories originally published in Usagi Yojimbo (vol. 1) #13–18
- Volume 4: Lone Goat and Kid (2022, IDW) – collects Usagi Yojimbo: Lone Goat and Kid #1–6, which contains stories originally published in Usagi Yojimbo (vol. 1) #19–24

=== Art books ===
- The Art of Usagi Yojimbo (2004, Dark Horse) – includes stories from Trilogy II Tour Book and the hardcover edition of Usagi Yojimbo Book Four
- The Sakai Project: Artists Celebrate Thirty Years of Usagi Yojimbo (2014, Dark Horse)
- Usagi Yojimbo Gallery Edition Volume 1: Samurai and Other Stories (2015, Dark Horse)
- Usagi Yojimbo Gallery Edition Volume 2: The Artist and Other Stories (2016, Dark Horse)
- Usagi Yojimbo: 35 Years of Covers (2019, Dark Horse)

== Related works ==
A project for an animated television series, Space Usagi, was cancelled following the failure of Bucky O'Hare and the Toad Wars. However, a Space Usagi action figure was produced for the Teenage Mutant Ninja Turtles line.

Two editions of an Usagi role-playing game have been made, a 1998 version, Usagi Yojimbo Roleplaying Game, from Gold Rush Games and a 2005 version from Sanguine Productions. A second edition of the 2005 version was successfully Kickstarted in 2019. A Hero Pack of Miyamoto Usagi, Gennosuke and Kitsune will be added to Arcadia Quest.

The comic is the basis of two video games: the 1988 game Samurai Warrior: The Battles of Usagi Yojimbo and the 2013 game Usagi Yojimbo: Way of the Ronin. Both are side-scrolling hack-and-slash action games.

Usagi returned to the Turtles franchise in the 2022 beat 'em up game Teenage Mutant Ninja Turtles: Shredder's Revenge, being based on his incarnation from the 1987 cartoon from which the rest of the game is based on. He became available as downloadable content in 2023.

== Reception ==
=== Awards ===
The series has been awarded 10 Eisner Awards and over 20 nominations.

- 1996 Eisner Award for "Best Letterer" (Groo and Usagi Yojimbo)
- 1996 Eisner Award for "Talent Deserving of Wider Recognition" (Usagi Yojimbo)
- 1999 Eisner Award for "Best Serialized Story" (Usagi Yojimbo "Grasscutter")
- 2012 Eisner Award for "Best Lettering" (Usagi Yojimbo)
- 2015 Eisner Award for "Best Lettering" (Usagi Yojimbo)
- 2018 Eisner Award for "Best Lettering" (Usagi Yojimbo and Groo: Slay of the Gods)
- 2020 Eisner Award for "Best Lettering" (Usagi Yojimbo)
- 2020 Eisner Award for Best Archival Collection/Project—Comic Books (Usagi Yojimbo: "The Complete Grasscutter" Artist Select, edited by Scott Dunbier)
- 2021 Eisner Award for "Best Lettering" (Usagi Yojimbo)
- 2021 Eisner Award for "Best Continuing Series" (Usagi Yojimbo)

The Japanese American National Museum in Los Angeles's Little Tokyo presented an exhibit entitled "Year of the Rabbit: Stan Sakai's Usagi Yojimbo from July 9 through October 30, 2011.

Usagi was rated No. 92 on IGN's Top 100 Comic Book Heroes.

=== Film references ===
Several of the characters in Usagi's world are inspired by or make reference to samurai movies. Usagi's former lord is named Mifune, which is a nod to Toshiro Mifune, an actor who starred in countless classic Samurai films. Gen, the rhino bounty hunter, was inspired by the characters made famous by Toshiro Mifune in the samurai films Yojimbo and Sanjuro. Zato-Ino, the Blind Swordspig, is a reference and tribute to the film character of Zatoichi. The story arc "Lone Goat and Kid" features an assassin who wanders with his son in a babycart, referring to the film/manga series Lone Wolf and Cub. Most significantly, the main character's name, Miyamoto Usagi, is a play on "Miyamoto Musashi", Japan's most famous historical samurai and the author of The Book of Five Rings, and Usagi the Japanese language word for "rabbit" (The story notes for one volume also cite as an influence Hiroshi Inagaki's Samurai Trilogy, which features Miyamoto Musashi as a protagonist.) His friend Tomoe Ame, a feline samurai, is inspired by the female samurai Tomoe Gozen. The storyline "The Dragon Bellow Conspiracy" includes elements reminiscent of the classic Akira Kurosawa films The Seven Samurai and The Hidden Fortress, particularly the way that Usagi collects various allies to raid an evil lord's fortress.

While Usagi Yojimbo draws most heavily upon samurai and chanbara films, it has also been influenced by Japanese films from other genres. For example, the three-part story "Sumi-E" (included in Vol. 18. Travels with Jotaro) features monsters resembling Godzilla (identified as "Zylla", who was first introduced in Vol. 2. Samurai), Gamera, Ghidorah, Mothra, and Daimajin.

== See also ==
- List of Usagi Yojimbo characters
- List of Usagi Yojimbo stories
