= Dogu Publishing =

Independent comic book publisher and entertainment rights company

- Status: Active
- Founded: 2022
- Founder: Stan Sakai
- Country of origin: United States
- Headquarters location: Cheyenne, WY
- Distribution: Dark Horse Comics
- Publication types: Comics
- Fiction genres: Action, adventure, science fiction, children's literature
- Imprints: Dogu Limited
- Official website: https://dogupublishing.com/

Dogu Publishing (also styled Dogū) is an independent comic book publisher and entertainment rights company established in 2022. It was launched by Usagi Yojimbo creator Stan Sakai as an imprint under the Dark Horse Comics banner.

== Overview ==
Stan Sakai founded Dogu to help expand the Usagi Yojimbo universe and support emerging and established creators. Though Stan and Dark Horse announced the launch of Dogu in conjunction with Sakai’s move back to Dark Horse from IDW, the first title published under the imprint was the five issue Teenage Mutant Ninja Turtles/Usagi Yojimbo: WhereWhen crossover for IDW beginning in March 2023. The first ongoing title under the Dark Horse partnership was the five issue Usagi Yojimbo: Ice and Snow miniseries in September that same year.

Outside of the Usagi Yojimbo universe, Dogu published Oni Ronin, a 120-page graphic novel in November of 2023.

In 2024, Dogu partnered with BOOM! Studios for the Mighty Morphin Power Rangers/Usagi Yojimbo one-shot.

Sakai has traditionally written, hand-drawn and hand-lettered Usagi Yojimbo himself, yet part of Dogu Publishing’s mission is to expand the Usagi Universe by including other authors and artists. To that end, Dogu announced that, for the first time, an Usagi Yojimbo spin-off series would be written and drawn by someone other than Sakai in 2025. Writer Zack Rosenberg (T.S. Hullabaloo) and National Cartoonist Society winning artist/letterer Jared Cullum (Kodi, Wonder City) took over the creative duties with the series, Usagi Yojimbo: Kaitō ‘84.

=== Entertainment and licensing ===
Outside of comics, Dogu hosted the TV series Voltes V: Legacy at San Diego Comic Con in 2023. This was the first Filipino TV program to participate at SDCC and had both a panel and a booth signing.

Dogu has also worked with NECA to launch a line of Usagi Yojimbo figures. The first were the Stan Sakai and Dogu Publishing editions in 2024. A collaboration of Teenage Mutant Ninja Turtles/Usagi Yojimbo: WhereWhen figures followed in 2026.

In 2026, Usagi Yojimbo also entered the Magic: The Gathering universe with a Secret Lair exclusive drop.

== Staff ==
- Stan Sakai (Creative Chairman & Founder)
- Jeremiah Blank (Chief Executive Officer)
- Julie Sakai (Chief Operating Officer)
- Daniel Fujii (President/Publisher)
- Emi Fujii (Publisher & Chief Creative Officer)
- Justin Eisinger (Editor-in-Chief)

== Publications ==
- Teenage Mutant Ninja Turtles/Usagi Yojimbo: WhereWhen (2023)
- Usagi Yojimbo: Ice and Snow (2023)
- Oni Ronin (2023)
- Space Usagi: Yokai Hunter (2023)
- Usagi Yojimbo: The Crow (2024)
- Mighty Morphin Power Rangers/Usagi Yojimbo (2024)
- Chibi Usagi: Attack of the Heebie Chibis - Expanded Edition (2025)
- Usagi Yojimbo: Kaitō ‘84 (2026)
- The Last Yojimbo (announced 2026)
