= Miyamoto Usagi =

Fictional character in Usagi Yojimbo

- Cover art of Usagi Yojimbo Volume 3, Issue 93. Art by Stan Sakai.

Publication information
- Publisher: Dark Horse Comics
- First appearance: Albedo Anthropomorphics Vol 1 #2: The Goblin of Adachigahara (1984)
- Created by: Stan Sakai
- Voiced by: Townsend Coleman (1989); Jason Griffith (2004–2009); Yuki Matsuzaki (2017, 2022)

In-story information
- Species: Rabbit
- Place of origin: Earth (1987)
- Partnerships: Leonardo (close friend); Raphael; Donatello; Michelangelo
- Abilities: Expert swordsmanship (with a katana); Highly skilled in bushido Stealth tactics Natural leadership skills

Miyamoto Usagi (Japanese: 宮本 兎) is a fictional character, who appears in the American comic book Usagi Yojimbo, a Dark Horse Comics book created by Stan Sakai. Usagi is an anthropomorphic rabbit (Usagi is Japanese for "rabbit") and a rōnin now walking the musha shugyō (warrior's pilgrimage).

The character was later incorporated into the Teenage Mutant Ninja Turtles franchise, being voiced by Townsend Coleman in the 1987 series, Jason Griffith in the 2003 series, and Yuki Matsuzaki in the 2012 series, who later reprised the role in the spin-off television series Samurai Rabbit: The Usagi Chronicles.

In May 2011, Miyamoto Usagi placed 92nd on IGN's Top 100 Comic Book Heroes of All Time. He also placed 31st in The 50 Greatest Comic Book Characters in Empire.

== Creation ==
Miyamoto Usagi is the main protagonist of Usagi Yojimbo, whom Sakai has said was inspired by the life of legendary swordsman Miyamoto Musashi. Originally intended to be a human, Sakai was inspired to anthropomorphize the character after doodling a rabbit with its ears bound in a style reminiscent of a samurai topknot.

== Character history ==
Usagi is a highly skilled swordsman and one of the best in the land.

Usagi was born the only son of a village headman. His two childhood playmates were Kenichi, with whom Usagi would have a less-than-friendly rivalry his whole life, and Mariko, one of the reasons for the boys' rivalry. Eventually, the trio went their separate ways when the boys were sent to be trained as samurai in the Dogora school of Bujitsu (en: arts of war). However, on the trip there, the boys witnessed a confrontation where a gang of arrogant Dogora students attacked a lone traveler named Katsuichi. Katsuichi had left the school years ago, dissatisfied with the poor calibre of the students. In spite of their numerical advantage, the gang was quickly defeated by the sensei's unusual, but definitely effective, technique. Although Kenichi was unimpressed by the display, Usagi pursued the departing sensei to petition him to become his student. Katsuichi initially refused, but relented when Usagi stood outside his home day and night through unpleasant weather long enough to convince the teacher of his determination.

For years, Usagi was the exclusive student of Katsuichi-sensei, and although he proved a mischievous pupil who got into various misadventures, he also excelled at his studies to become a formidable warrior. One of those misadventures involved a young Usagi stealing a dying soldier's wakizashi while walking through a battlefield with his teacher. Fraught with guilt over the theft, Usagi began seeing the now dead soldier in numerous situations, at one point having a nightmare that involved Katsuichi morphed into the soldier. Upon his return to the battlefield to return the sword to its rightful owner, Usagi was caught by adult samurai and accused of theft. Instead of summarily executing the young rabbit, they began the process of cutting his hand off. Before a blow could be struck, however, Usagi's future lord, Mifune, intervened on his behalf and, upon sensing the rabbit's honorable nature, let Usagi go.

At the end of his training, Katsuichi brought Usagi to a fencing tournament hosted by the Dogora school. Usagi won the tournament, his final match being against his old "comrade" Kenichi, who by then was the top student of the Dogora school, and earned his own daishō: the katana named Yagi no Eda (en: "Willow Branch") and the wakizashi named Aoyagi (en: "Young Willow"). The region's daimyō, Lord Mifune, was observing the contest and was impressed with Usagi's skill enough to offer him a position as a retainer. Before leaving to enter Mifune's service, Usagi returned to his village for a final farewell, where he found Kenichi had been staying at an inn in drunken despair, having sworn to leave the school due to his failure to win the tournament, but too ashamed to return home. Together, they returned to their village to free it from brigands that were threatening it. Kenichi decided to stay and would eventually become headman upon Usagi's father's death, which comforted Mariko somewhat against the loss of her other dearest friend. Kenichi and Mariko later married; however, before leaving the village, Usagi and Mariko had a romantic encounter that resulted in a son, Jotaro, whose parentage was hidden from Usagi for years.

In his term of service, Usagi rose to become a trusted personal bodyguard of his Lord and his family. That stable career was destroyed when a villainous rival lord, Lord Hikiji, sent ninja to assassinate the Mifune family. In the assault, Mifune's wife and son were murdered, and Lord Mifune waged war on his rival in revenge. That war concluded at the battle of Adachigahara, sometimes referenced as Adachi Plain, where Mifune had the upper hand until Buichi Toda, one of his subordinate commanders, betrayed him and joined with Hikiji. Usagi's friend and immediate superior, Gunichi, then fled the field upon seeing that the battle was lost. Lord Mifune was killed by an arrow barrage; Usagi performed his final duty, which was to escape with his lord's head to prevent the enemy from displaying it. As he fought free, he had his first personal confrontation with Hikiji, which left him with the distinctive arched scar over his left eye. Usagi escaped into the forest, buried Lord Mifune's head, and eluded pursuit by Hikiji's forces. By saving Lord Mifune's head from desecration, Usagi felt he had atoned for the disgrace of losing the battle. Otherwise, he would have felt compelled to commit seppuku. Usagi has since avenged his master's death upon both Toda and Gunichi, although Hikiji remains beyond his reach.

Now a rōnin, Usagi traveled the backroads of the region, making a living as a yojimbo for hire. In the course of his "warrior pilgrimage", he made deep friendships with many, including the young Lord Noriyuki of the Geishu Clan and his valiant bodyguard Ame Tomoe, the cynical rhino bounty-hunter Murakami Gennosuke, the enigmatic demon hunter magic swordsman Sasuké the Demon Queller, the brilliantly astute Hidden Christian Inspector Ishida, the renegade cat kunoichi Chizu, and the sly street-entertainer/petty thief Kitsune with her apprentice Kiyoko.

As the story progressed, he gained a new travelling companion. A rabbit rōnin named Yukichi Yamamoto, Usagi's cousin, who now walks the Warrior's Pilgrimage in search of harmony as well. He and Usagi met years ago when he visited the dojo to pay his respects to swordmaster Itsuki, Yukichi's teacher, and asked him to set up a meeting with him, but Yukichi didn't believe him then told him to leave. To prove his skill and technique, he cuts the branch and tells him to give the twig to Itsuki as Usagi's introduction. Unfortunately, Yukichi still didn't believe the rōnin and threw it on the ground. But when Itsuki sees the twig and asks him who did this, he tells him about his meeting with Usagi. Itsuki scolds him for not seeing the flawless cut on the twig, which shows the expert skill and stroke. He orders Yukichi to find Usagi and set up a meeting with him. But the time he did, he was already gone. Yukichi then sets off to find him. Eventually, he became the head instructor of Itsuki' dojo, but Itsuki passed away a month before he caught up with Usagi, making his task pointless. To atone for his failure, he became Usagi's new travelling companion who will aid him on his quest. He carries the very twig Usagi cut years ago as a reminder of his shortcomings.

== In other media ==
Usagi has appeared in various Teenage Mutant Ninja Turtles-related media.

=== Animation ===
==== TMNT (1987 animated series) ====
Usagi appears in two episodes of the 1987 Teenage Mutant Ninja Turtles animated series, voiced by Townsend Coleman. He lives in Feudal Japan on an alternate Earth where other animals and not humans have evolved into the dominating species. In the series, he is erroneously referred to as "Usagi Yojimbo".

A short pilot episode for an animated television series, Space Usagi, was created but cancelled following the failure of Bucky O'Hare and the Toad Wars. However, Space Usagi was one of the action figures produced under the Teenage Mutant Ninja Turtles line.

==== TMNT (2003 animated series) ====
Usagi makes his debut in the second season of the 2003 Teenage Mutant Ninja Turtles series, voiced by Jason Griffith. He first appears in "The Big Brawl, Part Two", where he comes to Leonardo's aid when the Turtle was attacked by shadow monsters. He addresses Leonardo as kappa and the two master swordsmen forge quite a close friendship. They later become competitors in the Battle Nexus Tournament, both fighting with honor and moral purpose. He expresses concern over Leonardo when he was poisoned by a dart, which was fired by the Ultimate Ninja himself, the power-hungry son of the Daimoyo. Wanting to help his new friend, he had Donatello allow him to use his knowledge in basic healing abilities to try and counteract the venom within Leo's system. The three later worked together in defending the Daimoyo from the Ultimate Ninja's assassins. Usagi went on to make several other appearances, including as Leonardo's guide when the turtle was accidentally sent to his world, and as an attendant of the wedding between April O'Neil and Casey Jones.

==== TMNT (2012 animated series) ====
Usagi appears in the fifth and last season of Teenage Mutant Ninja Turtles, voiced by Yuki Matsuzaki. The Turtles are whisked away to his dimension, (in the episodes "Yojimbo", "Osoroshi no Tabi" and "Kagayake! Kintaro") where he forges a close friendship with them; especially with Leonardo, as they are both levelheaded, quick-witted and highly skilled in "the ways of the sword."

In his home dimension (presumably an alternate reality of Feudal Japan), Usagi clashes with his archenemy, the wolf-demon Jei, who escapes from him yet again. He comes across a ransacked village and meets an extraordinary child by the name of Kintaro. He is tasked with protecting the boy from Jei until he realizes his own inherent superhuman abilities at the sacred Temple Palace. While setting camp, Usagi is ambushed by the Ninja Turtles who are controlled by Jei's evil magic, after being brought from his dimension. He welcomes the newcomers and explains his history as a samurai of great strength and skill. Disguising themselves, Usagi and the Turtles try and pursue Jei's Sumo Kuma but are discovered and fall off a cliff.

("Osoroshi no Tabi") In a haunted forest of yokai spirits, Usagi helps the Turtles fend off shapeshifting spirits that capture Michelangelo and Raphael. He appeases them by offering a carrot as a peace offering. Upon entering a cave full of giant spider webs, he is compelled by the voice of his good friend Akemi who is, in fact, a spider.

("Kagayake! Kintaro") Usagi, the Turtles and Kintaro continue their way in the snowy mountains until they are ambushed by Jei's white ninjas. After defeating the white ninjas, Usagi, the Turtles, and Kintaro to reach the Temple Palace, they discover that Jei was waiting for them. Having the Turtles under his mind control again, Jei captures Kintaro for the ritual, but is attacked by surprise by them, and Kintaro breaks free by displaying his great power. Usagi confronts Jei, until he finally defeats him and throws a bottomless precipice. The Sumo Kuma is also released from Jei's control by revealing himself as the head monk of the Temple. After Kintaro sends the Turtles to his dimension, Usagi leaves to help other innocents, knowing that if Kintaro ever needed his help, he would return.

==== Samurai Rabbit: The Usagi Chronicles (2022) ====
Reprised by Matsuzaki, Miyamoto Usagi makes recurring appearances in the 2022 animated series Samurai Rabbit: The Usagi Chronicles, which follows his descendant Yuichi. He appears in the episodes "Common Sensei", "Go", and "Soul Oath".

=== Video games ===
Miyamoto Usagi is also featured in Samurai Warrior: The Battles of Usagi Yojimbo. Usagi's first appearance in a Teenage Mutant Ninja Turtles game was in Teenage Mutant Ninja Turtles 2: Battle Nexus, based on his appearance in the 2003 animated series. He was a combatant in the game's Battle Nexus mode, but was not a playable character. Usagi has appeared as a playable character in Teenage Mutant Ninja Turtles: Shredder's Revenge in the Dimension Shellshock downloadable content.

== Reception ==
Usagi is often considered to be one of the greatest comic book characters. Wizard magazine rated him as the 57th greatest comic book character, while Empire rated him as the 31st greatest comic book character, stating that the noble leporine's longevity can be put down to an intriguing mix of historical and cinematic influence, cute fluffy bunnyness, and an ability to slice and dice with stunning efficiency. IGN also placed Usagi as the 92nd greatest comic book hero of all time, stating "despite his charming looks, Usagi is a serious hero whose adventures pay homage to classic samurai films and even the adventures of another hero Groo. And after all these years, Usagi Yojimbo remains as enjoyable as ever."
