= Teenage Mutant Ninja Turtles (2003 TV series) season 2 =

Teenage Mutant Ninja Turtles
- Season 2
- No. of episodes: 26

Release
- Original network: 4Kids TV
- Original release: November 8, 2003 – October 2, 2004

Season chronology
- ← Previous; Season 1 Next → Season 3

The second season of Teenage Mutant Ninja Turtles originally aired between November 8, 2003 and October 2, 2004, beginning with the "Turtles in Space, Part 1: The Fugitoid" episode. The episodes were first released on DVD in eight volumes, TMNT Volume nine through Volume fourteen. The volumes were released from May 18, 2004 through January 18, 2005. The episodes were later released in 2 part season sets; part 1 was released on February 19, 2008, containing the first 12 episodes of the season, and part 2 was released on October 28, 2008 with the final 14 episodes.

== Story ==
Picking up from the first season's cliffhanger, the Turtles find themselves teleported to the alien world of D'Hoonibb, where they immediately are caught up in a war between the Triceraton Republic and the Galactic Federation. The two races are fighting over Professor Honeycutt, also known as the Fugitoid, who has the plans for a teleportation device that both sides seek for their war efforts against each other. The Turtles end up on the Triceraton home world, and after saving Honeycutt, are teleported back to Earth by the Utroms. The aliens reveal themselves to be benevolent and reunite the Turtles with Splinter, whom they had healed after their last confrontation with the Shredder, who survived the battle as well. His attack is foiled when the Utroms are able to teleport to their home planet with Honeycutt, and his true nature as a Utrom criminal named Ch'rell is revealed before he is defeated once again.

In the wake of Shredder's defeat, a gang war erupts over control of his lost territory by the remainder of the Foot Clan, the Purple Dragons (led by Hun), and the New York mafia (aided by Baxter Stockman). Leonardo and Raphael argue over their place in fighting in the war, but the Turtles end up aiding Karai, Shredder's adopted daughter, in claiming control of the New York Foot Clan and restoring order to the city. Though they part with a friendly ceasefire, Shredder is revealed to have survived, and Karai's loyalty to her father conflicting with her honor becomes a critical dilemma for her for the remainder of the series. The Turtles meet a Triceraton named Zog who has become stranded on Earth after they returned and mistakes them for Triceraton officers. He helps them to attack a freighter belonging to the foot and stop Shredder from creating an army of advanced robotic soldiers.

In the season finale, the Turtles follow Splinter to the Battle Nexus, a kingdom where a tournament is held between the multiverse's greatest warriors by the Ultimate Daimyo. The Turtles meet new allies in the form of Miyamoto Usagi and Murakami Gennosuke and end up working to defeat an attempted coup on the Daimyo's life by his own son and Drako, Splinter's old foe.

== Cast ==
=== Main ===
- Michael Sinterniklaas as Leonardo: the leader of the Turtles who wields twin katana swords and a blue mask (appears in all 26 episodes).
- Sam Riegel as Donatello: the Turtles' genius engineer who is the primary source of their devices and vehicles who wields a bo staff and a purple mask (appears in all 26 episodes).
- Frank Frankson as Raphael: The most stubborn and temperamental of the four turtles who wields twin sai and a red mask (appears in all 26 episodes).
- Wayne Grayson as Michelangelo: the Turtles' and wise guy and a large source of comic relief who wields twin nunchucks and an orange mask (appears in all 26 episodes).

=== Supporting ===
- Darren Dunstan as Splinter: the Turtles' sensei and adopted father, the former pet of Hamato Yoshi. (18 episodes; has no lines in episode 13)
- Veronica Taylor as April: a woman who develops feelings for Casey Jones. (9 episodes; has no lines in episode 1)
- Marc Thompson as Casey: an ally of the Turtles who develops mutual feelings for April O'Neil. (11 episodes; has no lines in episode 1)
- Dan Green as Mortu: the leader of the benevolent Utroms.
- Oliver Wyman as Professor Honeycutt/Fugitoid: a Federation scientist whose mind was accidentally uploaded into an android's body, who possesses the plans for a teleportation device warred over by the Triceratons and Federation.

=== Villains ===
- Scottie Ray as Ch'rell/Oroku Saki/Shredder: the main antagonist of the series and leader of the Foot Clan, whose true nature is revealed early into the season. (7 episodes)
- Greg Carey as Hun: Shredder's second-in-command, a hulking gangster, and the leader of the Purple Dragons. Briefly broke away from the Foot to run the Purple Dragons full-time following Shredder's disappearance, but later re-joined after Shredder's return, though he lost his position as Shredder's lieutenant to Karai.
- Scott Williams as Baxter Stockman: a brilliant, maniacal scientist who abandons the Foot for a majority of the season. (9 episodes)
- Karen Neil as Karai: the adopted daughter of Shredder whose devoted service and loyalty to him conflicts with her sense of honor. After Shredder returns, she becomes his new second-in-command.
- Oliver Wyman as General Blanque: the leader of the Federation.
- Michael Alston Bailey as
  - Zanramon: the despotic Prime Leader of the Triceraton Republic.
  - Big Boss: the leader of the Mob.
- Dan Green as Commander Mozar: the second in command of the Triceraton Republic.

=== Recurring ===
- Marc Thompson as
  - The Ultimate Daimyo: a warrior king who hosts a tournament of the multiverse's greatest warriors every 3 years.
  - Drako: a draconian warrior who carries a grudge towards Splinter for besting him in the Battle Nexus tournament years ago.
- Jason Griffith as Miyamoto Usagi: an anthropomorphic rabbit samurai whom the Turtles meet in the Battle Nexus tournament.
- Frederick B. Owens as
  - Traximus: an honorable Triceraton gladiator the Turtles befriend.
  - Leatherhead: a mutant crocodile tricked into helping Baxter Stockman.
- Ted Lewis as
  - Ue-Sama: a warrior prince who goes by the title "Ultimate Ninja", who seeks a battle with Leonardo.
  - Kluh: a hulking Levram warrior who becomes an enemy of Michelangelo.
- Oliver Wyman as Gyoji: the referee of the Battle Nexus.
- Eric Stuart as Murakami Gennosuke: an anthropomorphic rhino whom the Turtles meet in the Battle Nexus tournament.

== Crew ==
Teenage Mutant Ninja Turtles was produced by Mirage Studios, 4Kids Entertainment, 4Kids Productions, and Dong Woo Animation and distributed by 4 Kids Entertainment and was aired on Fox's Saturday morning kids' block in the US. The producers were Gary Richardson, Frederick U. Fierst, and Joellyn Marlow for the American team; Tae Ho Han was the producer for the Korean team.

== Episodes ==
No. overall	No. in season	Title	Directed by	Written by	Original release date	Prod. code
27	1	"Turtles in Space"	Chuck Patton	Michael Ryan	November 8, 2003	S02E01
28	2	"Turtles in Space"	Chuck Patton	Eric Luke	November 15, 2003	S02E02
29	3	"Turtles in Space"	Chuck Patton	Marty Eisenberg	November 22, 2003	S02E03
30	4	"Turtles in Space"	Chuck Patton	Michael Ryan	November 29, 2003	S02E04
31	5	"Turtles in Space"	Chuck Patton	Marty Eisenberg	December 6, 2003	S02E05
Part 1 - The Fugitoid: The Turtles find themselves beamed halfway across the universe to the planet D'Hoonnib and right into the middle of a police action! Part 2 - The Trouble with Triceratons: On the planet D'Hoonnib, the Turtles team up with the Fugitoid, a.k.a. Professor Honeycutt, a scientist trapped in a robot's body, who is being pursued by the rogue military forces of General Blanque. Part 3 - The Big House: The Turtles are taken prisoners by the Triceratons and thrown into a Tri prison, their lives to be used as a bargaining chip to convince the Fugitoid to build his Teleportal device. Part 4 - The Arena: The Turtles are taken to the Tri-sports Arena, where gladiators go in but never come out. Part 5 - Triceraton Wars: The turtles are faced with their biggest challenge yet, getting home!
32	6	"Secret Origins"	Chuck Patton	Eric Luke	January 17, 2004	S02E06
33	7	"Secret Origins"	Chuck Patton	Michael Ryan	January 24, 2004	S02E07
34	8	"Secret Origins"	Chuck Patton	Marty Isenberg	January 31, 2004	S02E08
The Turtles are teleported back to Earth with Professor Honeycutt by the Utroms and reunite with Splinter. The Utroms take the Turtles and Splinter to the oracle pod chamber, a virtual reality simulation that chronicles historical events. Inside the chamber, the Turtles discover that the Utroms were transporting a criminal who caused them to crash land on the Earth in Feudal Japan, where they are forced to live in secret among humans and deal with the feudal versions of the Foot Clan and Shredder. After Baxter Stockman infiltrates the TCRI building and sabotages the oracle pods, the Turtles and Splinter become trapped in virtual reality and must battle the feudal Shredder and his Foot Ninja while pursuing the Guardians so they can find a way out of the simulation. The Turtles and Splinter activate the internal fail-safe of the oracle pod chamber only to find the TCRI building besieged by multiple enemies. The National Guard stands outside the building trying to get in while Shredder leads an attack at the heart of the Utrom's base. The Turtles and Splinter help the Utroms to their homeworld and learn that Shredder is the one who caused the Utroms to crash. They evacuate the building and reunite with their friends, leaving Shredder in the imploding building.
35	9	"Reflections"	Chuck Patton	Roland Gonzalez	February 14, 2004	S02E09
The gang return to the farmhouse in Northampton to rest and recuperate. Taking a retrospective look at the recent events, they discuss their encounters with Shredder as well as the discovery of his true form – a centuries-old criminal Utrom. However, despite his maliciousness, the Turtles and Splinter realize that Shredder also played an instrumental role in their origins.
36	10	"The Ultimate Ninja"	Chuck Patton	Michael Ryan	February 7, 2004	S02E10
The Turtles, Splinter, Casey and April relax in the lair for a movie night. However, during an ice cream run, Leonardo is challenged to a gyoji-refereed duel by a headstrong young ninja from another dimension. The challenge comes in a tradition unfamiliar to Leonardo, but worrisome familiar to Master Splinter.
37	11	"The Return of Nano"	Chuck Patton	Eric Luke	February 21, 2004	S02E11
Nano, the nanorobot who met his supposed demise in the junkyard, reawakens and reassembles. With a newfound motivation to create a family, Nano breaks his "father" Harry Parker out of Rikers Island and kidnaps his "mother", Dr. Richards, from her laboratory. When his "family" does not turn out as he hoped, Nano goes berserk and begins to wreak havoc on Coney Island, where April and Casey happen to be on a "not-a-date".
38	12	"What a Croc!"	Chuck Patton	Ben Townsend	February 28, 2004	S02E12
Michelangelo helps Donatello by exploring the underwater accessway beneath the lair. Here he encounters Leatherhead, a mutant crocodile torn between two personalities: a peaceful inventor and a vicious animal. The Turtles go with Leatherhead to his sewer home and encounter an old foe with whom Leatherhead has teamed up.
39	13	"Return to the Underground"	Chuck Patton	Marty Isenberg	March 6, 2004	S02E13
Determined to find a cure for his mutated friends, Donatello and his brothers return to the subterranean city. Unfortunately, when the Turtles return, they find that their friends have reverted to monsters and the Crystal Moon is nowhere to be seen.
40	14	"City at War"	Chuck Patton	Eric Luke	March 13, 2004	S02E14
41	15	"City at War"	Chuck Patton	Marty Isenberg	March 20, 2004	S02E15
42	16	"City at War"	Chuck Patton	Ben Townsend	March 27, 2004	S02E16
With Shredder gone, the Foot Clan, the Purple Dragons, and the mob struggle to control New York City, quickly turning the streets into a dangerous turf war. Feeling the onus of the chaos in the streets, Leonardo sets out to quell the situation while Raphael argues that it's not their fight. The Turtles become embroiled in the turf war as they face off against the Foot, headed by the Elite Guard, while a mob-funded attack robot created by Baxter Stockman and the Purple Dragons, led by Hun, besiege the Foot's rundown headquarters. To make matters more complicated, a ninja from Japan named Karai enters the fray, though her intentions are ambiguous. At her mercy, the Turtles have no choice but to bargain with her. Karai introduces herself as Shredder's adopted daughter and leader of the Foot operations in Japan. She promises the Turtles that the Foot Clan will leave them in peace if they help her assume Shredder's role to stop the raging turf war. Raphael refuses to help, but his brothers and Casey go along with the plan.
43	17	"Junklantis"	Chuck Patton	Eric Luke	April 3, 2004	S02E17
With the underwater accessway complete, Donatello and Michelangelo explore the Hudson River in the newly christened Shell Sub. They soon come across an underwater fortress, which Mikey dubs Junklantis. It is of little surprise that the inhabitants of this facility are responsible for the freighters disappearing in New York Harbor. However, it is a surprise to see this facility is run by the egomaniacal Garbageman.
44	18	"The Golden Puck"	Chuck Patton	Michael Ryan	April 10, 2004	S02E18
Casey takes the Turtles to see a game of his favorite sport, Super Slam Hockey. When parahawks piloted by Texan roughnecks swoop down and steal the sport's championship prize, the Golden Puck, Casey will stop at nothing to recover it. With the help of the Turtles, Casey takes on the roughnecks and their employer, Mr. Arboost.
45	19	"Rogue in the House"	Chuck Patton	Eric Luke	April 17, 2004	S02E19
46	20	"Rogue in the House"	Chuck Patton	Ben Townsend	April 24, 2004	S02E20
Somehow, Shredder survived their last encounter and seeks revenge on the Turtles. When Shredder learns that much of the Foot has been killed during the recent turf war, Hun introduces Saki to their new army of Foot Mechs. With their army almost complete, the Foot sends a mech to find and destroy the Turtles. When this Foot Mech attacks his family, Splinter devises a counterattack with the aid of a powerful warrior in a tricky alliance. Leonardo, Raphael, and Splinter are held captive on Shredder's freighter and Karai is forced to make a choice – honor her promise to the Turtles or obey her master. Meanwhile, Donatello attempts to destroy Shredder's new headquarters, while Michelangelo and Zog find themselves fighting against Shredder's Foot Ninja.
47	21	"April's Artifact"	Chuck Patton	Marty Isenberg	May 1, 2004	S02E21
As the Turtles and Casey help April prepare her antique shop for reopening, April stumbles on a puzzle cube that used to belong to her Uncle Augie. As she cleans the artifact off, the cube begins to glow bright and transports April and the Turtles to an alternate dimension. Traveling through a tropical environment, they must evade large hornets and find their way home.
48	22	"Return of the Justice Force"	Chuck Patton	Marty Isenberg	May 8, 2004	S02E22
When Splinter encourages his sons to leave the lair so he can meditate, the Turtles and Casey take the opportunity to go on a road trip to Northampton. On a trip spurred on by Michelangelo's desire to find a missing issue of the Justice Force, the gang find themselves in an adventure with the real-life Justice Force.
49	23	"The Big Brawl"	Chuck Patton	Michael Ryan	May 15, 2004	S02E23
50	24	"The Big Brawl"	Chuck Patton	Ben Townsend	September 18, 2004	S02E24
51	25	"The Big Brawl"	Chuck Patton	Marty Isenberg	September 25, 2004	S02E25
52	26	"The Big Brawl"	Chuck Patton	Michael Ryan	October 2, 2004	S02E26
As he does every three years, Master Splinter mysteriously goes off and leaves his sons for a few days. This time, however, curiosity sets in and the Turtles follow him through an interdimensional gateway, ending up in a nexus between dimensions, where the multiverse's greatest warriors meet to duel each other in tournaments. Through an old friend of Splinter's who had battled him in the qualifying round, the Turtles learn that Splinter was the past Battle Nexus champion, who defeated an evil dragon named Drako in the final round despite breaking his leg. Despite his discontent, Master Splinter hesitantly allows his sons to enter the competition. In the Battle Nexus, the Turtles fight other warriors from different dimensions in an attempt to become the Battle Nexus Champion. Leonardo teams up with the rabbit ronin Miyamoto Usagi to fight off would-be assassins before the tournament started. During round one Donatello is knocked out while the other three turtles and Splinter advance. During round two, Raphael defeats his Triceration ally Traximus, Splinter forfeits to allow Michaelangelo to advance, and Leo is hit by a poison dart shot by the Ultimate Ninja while fighting Usagi. Master Splinter is framed for attempting to kill the Ultimate Daimyo and is imprisoned while Raphael and Michelangelo find themselves pitted against each other in the Battle Nexus Tournament. Michelangelo manages to take advantage of Raphael's anger and beat him without throwing a punch. Meanwhile, Leonardo falls into a coma after being struck by a poisonous dart, and Donatello and Usagi must defend Leo and a gravely wounded Daimyo from more assassins. Michelangelo reaches the finals and faces off against Kluh to become the Battle Nexus Champion. Concurrently, Donatello and Usagi continue to defend the Daimyo and Leonardo against assassins while Raphael and Traximus attempt to free the imprisoned Master Splinter. The recent swirl of events has all been orchestrated by the Daimyo's son, the Ultimate Ninja, and Drako who seek control of the Daimyo's warstaff as well as revenge on Leonardo and Splinter for their past defeats.
