= One Bad Day =

One Bad Day may refer to:

- "One Bad Day" (Gotham), 2018 television episode
- One Bad Day (novel), by Steve Rolston, 2003
- "One Bad Day" (song), by Spacey Jane, 2024
- "One Bad Day" (The Punisher), 2019 television episode

== See also ==
- Bad Day (disambiguation)
- One Day (disambiguation)
