= Shingen (disambiguation) =

Shingen (1521–1573) was a pre-eminent daimyō in feudal Japan with exceptional military prestige in the late stage of the Sengoku period.

Shingen may also refer to:

- Shingen Yashida, a villain from the Marvel Comics universe that appears as the enemy of Wolverine
- Shingen (Usagi Yojimbo), a minor character from Usagi Yojimbo comic books
- Takeda Shingen (TV series), a 1988 Japanese historical drama television series featuring Kiichi Nakai as Shingen that aired on NHK
