= List of storms named Tokage =

The name Tokage (Japanese: トカゲ, [to̞ka̠ɡe̞]) has been used for four tropical cyclones in the western North Pacific Ocean. The name was contributed by Japan and refers to the constellation Lacerta, the lizard, in Japanese.

- Typhoon Tokage (2004) (T0423, 27W, Siony) – struck Japan.
- Tropical Storm Tokage (2011) (T1107, 09W, Hanna) - a weak tropical storm that churned at the ocean without affecting landmasses; absorbed by Typhoon Ma-on.
- Severe Tropical Storm Tokage (2016) (T1625, 29W, Marce) - struck the Philippines.
- Typhoon Tokage (2022) (T2210, 11W) – remained out at sea.

Preceded by Tsing-ma	Pacific typhoon season names Tokage	Succeeded by Ong-mang
