= List of Usagi Yojimbo characters =

Cover of Usagi Yojimbo Volume 3, Issue 52, by Stan Sakai. Kitsune is holding Sachiko.

This list of Usagi Yojimbo characters features characters from the Usagi Yojimbo comic book.

== Major characters ==
- Miyamoto Usagi – Miyamoto Usagi is the titular character (inspired by Miyamoto Musashi) and an anthropomorphic rabbit (Usagi is Japanese for rabbit) and a rōnin now walking the musha shugyō (the warrior's journey).
- Chizu – A member of the Neko Ninja and the sister of Shingen. Upon her brother's death she briefly succeeded him as the clan's leader, but internal power struggles eventually drove her into exile; ever since that time she is actively seeking to counter Hikiji's schemes. She has met Usagi several times and even has developed a crush on him, but their respective senses of duty prevent them from traveling together.
  Chizu appears in the 2003 Teenage Mutant Ninja Turtles series' episode "The Real World, Part I" as the leader of the Neko Ninja, voiced by Caren Manuel.
- Lord Hebi – A snake and ruthless daimyō loyal to Lord Hikiji, who often directs and acts as his middle man for Hikiji's plots.
  Lord Hebi appeared in the 2003 TMNT series, in the episodes "The Real World, Part 1" and "Samurai Tourist", voiced by Michael Sinterniklaas, who, throughout the whole show, also voiced Leonardo.
- Lord Hikiji – Lord Hikiji is a power hungry daimyo and the main antagonist of the series. Unlike the other characters in the series, he is depicted as a human. He is often mentioned but rarely appears, preferring to stay in the shadows and letting Hebi act in his name. He acts as a background nemesis to Usagi, as he personally killed both his lord and his father, and struck Usagi with the arched scar above his left brow during the fateful battle on Adachi Plain.
- Inspector Ishida - Inspector Ishida is a police detective in a large city whose government was corrupted by at least two villains. Ishida, however, is a steadfastly honest officer with a deep commitment to the cause of justice, regardless of who the criminals and their victims are, and sometimes even seeing justice done if there is no legal way of achieving it. He is quiet, but highly observant and astute in his reasoning; those faculties are invaluable in difficult cases like murder, in a culture where intensive examinations of dead bodies, like an autopsy, are taboo. In addition, when force is called for, he demonstrates formidable fighting skills using his standard police weapon, the jutte, although he is allowed to also carry a katana. In the seven-part miniseries The Hidden, he is revealed to be a secret Christian.
  Ishida first appeared in "The Hairpin Murders". Although the character was intended only as a one-shot in this story, he soon proved unexpectedly popular and series creator Stan Sakai has used him in numerous other stories.
  Ishida is based on real-life Honolulu policeman Chang Apana, who was also the model for the fictional detective Charlie Chan. As Max Allan Collins points out in the introduction to "Book #13: Grey Shadows", Inspector Ishida is, like the real Chang Apana, a more hardboiled character than the mild-mannered Charlie Chan from the novels by Earl Derr Biggers and the subsequent film adaptations.
- Jei – A tall anthropomorphic wolf with a black-bladed yari, Jei is known as Jei-san, The Blade of the Gods, The Black Soul, The Demon Spearman, and a number of other dark nicknames. Although Lord Hikiji is considered the main villain of the series, Jei is the closest thing to a true nemesis of Miyamoto Usagi. Jei, formerly a priest named Jizonobu who fell under the sway of sinister entities, believes that he was chosen by the gods as an emissary, to smite evil and execute sinners. However, in his delusions, Jei perceives everyone to be a sinner and has the tendency of killing anyone who draws his attention. Whether or not he still has his mental faculties, Jei does possess some supernatural power. The most obvious of Jei's abilities is his immortality; despite being "killed" numerous times, Jei has always returned in some form or another.
  Jei is based on the fictional serial killer Jason Voorhees from the Friday the 13th horror movie series; the name "Jei-san" is, in fact, a pun on "Jason".
  Jei appears in two Usagi Yojimbo/Teenage Mutant Ninja Turtles crossover stories in 2017, including a comic story by IDW Publishing and a three-episode story arch in the 2012 animation series.
- Tomoe Ame – Tomoe Ame is an anthropomorphic cat who is loosely based on the famous female samurai, Tomoe Gozen. (Tomoe Ame is also a brand of Japanese candy that Stan Sakai particularly liked.) Tomoe is a samurai of the Geishu clan and serves as Lord Noriyuki's personal bodyguard and closest adviser since she single-handedly saved his life from an attack by the Neko Ninja. She also happens to be a very close friend of Miyamoto Usagi, whom she and Lord Noriyuki first met as they were being pursued by assassins that Lord Hikiji hired to kill the young lord. Usagi was able to help protect Lord Noriyuki, and as a result Tomoe has become very grateful to Usagi, and the two have helped each other out many times since. As time passes, Usagi and Tomoe develop deep feelings for each other that go beyond mere friendship. However, recently, Lord Noriyuki is preparing to form an arranged marriage between her with another lord.
  An animated version of Tomoe Ame appears in an episode of the 2003 TMNT animated series "The Real World - Part 1" and is voiced by Rachael Lillis.
- Murakami Gennosuke – Murakami Gennosuke (or Gen) is an anthropomorphic Indian rhinoceros who makes a living as a rather disreputable bounty hunter. Originally, he was the son of an important samurai of a prominent lady until her husband was assassinated by a villainous subordinate. The lady took her entire entourage, including Gen's family, on a quest for vengeance, only to gradually slide into utter poverty. His mother was forced to prostitute herself for her family to survive; eventually she died, and as Gen matured, his father trained him in the ways of the sword. Upon reaching adulthood, Gen abandoned his father, wanting nothing to do with his vendetta (although he eventually became embroiled in its resolution), and became a professional bounty hunter who disdains bushido in favor of a cynical mercenary attitude never to be poor again.
  Gen appears in the 2003 TMNT series along with Usagi. In the episode "Samurai Tourist", Gen, puts on human clothing that makes him look almost identical to Rocksteady, the mutant rhinoceros from the 1987 TMNT cartoon series. Also in that episode, Gen is chased by Kojima, an assassin who happens to be a humanoid warthog (a homage to Rocksteady's partner Bebop).
- Kitsune – Kitsune is an anthropomorphic fox (kitsune, きつね, is Japanese for "fox", 狐), and a street performer and master thief. Originally the daughter of a failing fabric broker, she was sold to an inn by her new stepmother, who despised her. When she was to be resold to a brothel, she fled and took up stealing in order to survive; hence her life's motto: "A girl has to do what she can to get by". Her street performance is based on manipulating tops with objects such as fans or chopsticks. While she is self-serving, she is willing to sacrifice herself for close friends if need be. Usagi disapproves of her thieving ways (especially since she occasionally ends up picking his pocket as well), but he knows she is not malicious, and often ends up helping her in getting out of a tight spot in her schemes. After meeting Gennosuke, she and the bounty hunter have apparently developed a romantic relationship with each other. Aside from Usagi and Gen, Kitsune only has three other important friends: Sachiko, her surrogate sister and mentor who was killed by a samurai she robbed by invoking his right of kiri-sute gomen; Noodles, a child-minded strongman who was executed by a corrupt police officer as a scapegoat; and Kiyoko, a young girl and Kitsune's apprentice in the ways of thievery.
- Yamamoto Yukichi - Usagi's cousin by his father's sister. He first met Usagi as a student of the Itsuki sword school, which Usagi intended to visit, but rudely dismissed him, unaware of their family bonds. It was years later, after his master's death and his own rise as his school's head instructor, that he would meet Usagi again and learn of their common connection. After fulfilling a final obligation to his sensei, he joins Usagi in his wanderings.

== Other characters ==
- Buichi Kubo - A samurai appearing in the miniseries Senso as Tomoe Ame's husband upon Lord Horikawa's conspirational arrangements. While married purely for political status, and with no love lost between them, Buichi and Tomoe still respect each other. While sent to Edo to inform the Shogun about the alien invasions, Buichi teams up with the Komori Ninja to destroy another alien landing ship at the cost of their own lives.
- Gunichi – A samurai in service of Lord Mifune who was a skilled swordsman with masterful control of the blade. He first meet Usagi when he was a little boy returning a wakizashi to a dead soldier on the battlefield and did not think much of him. That opinion changed when he confronted the rabbit after his training was completed and challenged him to a duel as a test. When that duel was interrupted by rival swordsmen lying in ambush, they fought them off together and Gunichi was impressed enough with Usagi's skill to call a draw to their fight and recommend him for his Lord's service. The two enjoyed a close comradeship that ended at the Battle of Adachi Plain when Gunichi deserted his lord in battle over Usagi's objections. Much later, Gunichi and Usagi faced each other for the last time, and Usagi slew him for his betrayal.
- Lord Horikawa – An advisor to Lord Noriyuki. While he publicly appears as a merely arrogant, sycophantic individual condescending to anyone beneath him, he is secretly a conniving, scheming individual who desires to be Noriyuki's principal advisor. To this end, he intends to remove Tomoe Ame from the young lord's side (though drawing the line at outright murder, lest this would expose him), and has influenced Noriyuki into marrying Tomoe off "for her own good". One of Horikawa's ancestors was already a traitor who attempted to deliver the Geishu clan to one of its enemies during a critical battle.
- General Ikeda – Ikeda was the general of the army of Lord Araki, a vassal to Lord Mataichi, head of the Geishu Clan. When Araki challenged Mataichi for the rulership of the Geishu Province and lost, Ikeda fled and took up the life of a peasant, waiting for the right time to take revenge; but as time passed and he found solace in his new life, he forsook his vengeance. Years later, Mataichi's son Noriyuki and his bodyguard Tomoe Ame sought refuge from a traitor in Ikeda's home, he and his son Motokazu helped in getting them to safety; and for that, he received a pardon from Noriyuki and the promise to take Motokazu into his service. He later aided Usagi, Gen, and his former retainer Sanshobo in securing the legendary sword Grasscutter, but lost his life in a battle against the Neko Ninja.
- Inazuma – Inazuma (稲妻; "Lightning"; her real name is Tomiko) is an anthropomorphic cat. She is one of the fiercest swordswomen in the series, easily matching or besting many of the other characters in fighting skill; unlike other characters, Inazuma's skill with a sword is almost all natural talent, as opposed to years of training. She ran way from an arranged marriage, eloping with a young samurai who fell into poverty and was killed by criminal gamblers. She slew the boss of the gamblers in retaliation, which made her a hunted fugitive after his father put a substantial bounty on Inazuma's head. She is later possessed by Jei, who is subsequently exorcised by Sanshobo; but Inazuma dies from injuries incurred during her possession.
- Inukai (Stray Dog) – A bounty hunter who is notorious for his ruthlessness and his surly mistrust of others, especially samurai. However, he secretly is a beloved benefactor of an orphanage, and his apparent greediness is partially based on his desire to raise funds for its cause.
- Isamu – The brother of Inazuma. He first appears as an enigmatic and stern bounty hunter, but it is later revealed that he is hunting for his sister to bring her home to her forgiving father.
- Chief Inspector Ito – Inspector Ishida's irritable superior, who is more concerned about keeping his position rather than dispensing true justice, which regularly puts him at odds with Ishida.
- Jotaro – Jotaro is the son of the titular character Miyamoto Usagi, but they do not acknowledge it to each other because his mother Mariko decided not to tell either of them that they share this knowledge. They treat each other as uncle and nephew, and neither is aware that the other knows the truth. Jotaro is currently training to be a samurai under Katsuichi and has displayed formidable skill for his age; he has defeated adult opponents with his bokken in single combat, despite his still small stature.
- Kakera – An anthropomorphic rat and mystic possessing the gift of foresight and the ability to summon beings from other realities, specifically the Teenage Mutant Ninja Turtles. He was exclusively featured in the Usagi Yojimbo crossover comics "Shades of Green" #1-3 (featuring the Mirage-Turtles) and TMNT/Usagi Yojimbo (with the IDW-Turtles). His name (欠片; engl. "splinter") and appearance are a clear nod to Splinter, the adoptive father of the Turtles.
- Katsuichi – Katsuichi is one of the most formidable swordsmen in the series. His name is said by Stan Sakai to be a combination of katsu ("to win") and ichi ("one"), or "one who wins". He is an anthropomorphic lion samurai sensei who rejected the orthodox fighting styles to create a distinctive new technique. The death of the love of his life, slain by a greedy rival from another sword school, further cemented his decision. However, he soon abandoned his school due to his dissatisfaction with the poor quality students available. Only a handful of students have managed to adapt his style, including Usagi and his son Jotaro.
- Keiko – A little girl who is Jei's companion. She joined him after Jei killed a gang of bandits who had murdered her grandfather, who was her only remaining relative. She seems to share a strange connection with Jei's spirit as is able to recognize him immediately when he possesses a new host and realize when he has abandoned a host temporarily. She is the only person Jei seems to care about and that is safe near him. She refers to him as "uncle".
- Kenichi – A childhood rival of Usagi and now magistrate of their village. He has had a spiteful mutual enmity against Usagi since childhood which led to blows more than once. However, in the face of common enemies, the pair has gotten along well on a professional basis.
- Komori Ninjas - The Komori Ninjas are a clan of ninja bats in the Usagi Yojimbo comic book series. First appearing in Vol.1 #21, "Blood Wings," the clan is the foremost rising rival of the Neko Ninja clan, whose numbers were severely depleted in the climactic battle in "The Dragonbellow Conspiracy" story arch. They have an open rivalry with the Neko Ninja for Lord Hikiji's favour, which has often led to bloodshed. There is, however, a bit of respect and honour for each other shared by both the clan leaders. Unlike the Neko, who are largely humanoid in body type, the Komori have winged bodies which enable them to fly with ease. They typically arm themselves with long sword blades lining the edges of their wings to make for devastating attacks in flight. A favourite move is used when an opponent attempts to take shelter in a forested area; the ninja would slash at the foliage, creating a terrifying and blinding storm of debris that often disorients the victim while they are being exposed. At present, both clans are in the employ of Lord Hikiji as they vie to be the exclusive client for the daimyō.
  - Kurokaze – The kashira (leader) of the Komori Ninja clan; his name means "black wind". He is occasionally mentioned, but so far, Kurokaze is only seen in the Grasscutter II saga; he considers the neko ninja as adversaries of the Komori ninja for Lord Hikiji's favor, although he respects Chizu for her skills.
  - Kazehime - a female Komori Ninja ("wind princess") whom Usagi managed to befriend after he saved her life when she crashed in a storm. They later clashed when Usagi participated in escorting a merchant the Komori were assigned to assassinate. Kazehime was killed by one of the escorts when she hesitated in slaying her benefactor.
- Kiyoko - Kitsune's apprentice.
- Koroshi – A powerful and widespread guild of assassins. Usagi has encountered and foiled their agents multiple times, and has therefore been marked for assassination himself. Their agents often have an alternate persona, such as a peddlar or a priest, that allows them to travel undetected.
- Kotaro - The son of Lady Maple, a renowned oiran, and a clan lord who innocently became embroiled in a succession conspiracy which eventually cost the life of his mother. Usagi helped in saving him and entrusted him with Inspector Ishida, who along with his wife adopted him as their new son.
- The Lord of Owls - an enigmatic, apparently unaging wandering swordsman by the name of Oyama Tadanori who is able to see death in a person's eyes. (In feudal Japan, an owl was seen as an omen of evil and imminent death.) Sometimes he kills the people he has predicted to die, usually only in self-defense, although he tends to provoke some with his premonitions.
- Mariko – A childhood friend of Usagi and his great love. However, she married Kenichi after Usagi left to become a samurai with Lord Mifune, but not before Usagi and she had an impulsive tryst that produced a son, Jotaro. Kenichi married her with full knowledge of her illegitimate pregnancy while Usagi was not informed of the situation as to avoid him abandoning his post for her. Eventually, Mariko told Usagi about Jotaro and insisted he leave the village when he returned to stay, although brief future visits were permitted. Later on, she told Jotaro about his biological father, but for some reason did not mention that Usagi knew the truth himself. Despite the fact she still harbors feelings for Usagi, she realizes her place is with Kenichi.
- Lord Mifune – Usagi's Lord until his death in the Battle of Achi Plain. His character is named for the great Samurai actor, Toshiro Mifune. Lord Mifune was a Tiger of mercy and honor such as when he was presented with Usagi as a kitten, wrongly accused of looting the war dead. Mifune believed the child's firm honest denial of the charge and allowed him to leave unharmed. He later saw Usagi as a young adult winning at a tournament, bestowed a daisho as a prize and hired the rabbit as a retainer. When Mifune's family was assassinated by ninja sent on Lord Hikiji's orders, he made war and was only defeated when a subordinate commander betrayed him to Hikiji on Adachi Plain. However, even death could not silence his spirit completely such as what happened to Usagi after the samurai fled the lost battle with his lord's head and buried it in secret to prevent it being desecrated. After that act of honor, Usagi fell into the clutches of a supernatural entity and was saved only when Mifune's spirit appeared and slew the entity for his loyal retainer.
- Motokazu – Son of General Ikeda, Sanshobo's former lord. He was born during his father's exile in hiding as a peasant and had no knowledge of his father's previous life. That changed when Tomoe Ame and Lord Noriyuki were fleeing an ambush and inadvertently sought shelter at the rebel's home. Long past his need for revenge for his defeat, the general agreed to help the fugitives and took his son along in a perilous adventure. At its conclusion where the Lord desired to reward Ikeda, they agreed for Motokazu to join Noriyuki's court when he came of age after training by his father. In the "Grasscutter II - Journey To Atsuta Shrine" story arc, Ikeda is killed in battle by the Neko Ninjas, but Lord Noriyuki keeps to his word making the young boy his page with Tomoe his mentor. Motokazu has since grown into his new responsibilities well, displaying extraordinary courage in his adventures. As a result, Noriyuki has promoted him to samurai status, despite his youth, with the approval of Motokazu's teacher as well as Tomoe and Usagi.
- Mogura Ninja – The Mogura Ninja are a ninja clan in the Usagi Yojimbo story world, composed of anthropomorphic moles. They are the least seen of the three ninja clans, having been seen less than ten times. As moles, their particular talents are digging and lying in wait underground. They characteristically attack an enemy building by tunneling underneath and bypassing the outer defenses; they can also lie underground until an enemy passes overhead, and then spring an ambush. In combat, they use their long, sharp claws as weapons as well as digging tools. Although they are formidable fighters in their element, they have weaknesses that an opponent can exploit, such as vulnerability to bright light.
  The Mogura appeared in the 2003 Teenage Mutant Ninja Turtles episode "The Real World, Part I," where they attacked Leonardo, Tomoe Ame, and Lord Noriyuki. Though they were driven off by the timely arrival of Usagi and Gennosuke, they were successful in kidnapping Tomoe, taking her to Lord Hebi.
- Nakamura Koji – A samurai and teacher of one of the eight traditional schools of fencing, who was to become Lord Hikiji's personal trainer. Lord Hikiji wanted Koji to fight a duel against an upstart swordsman who shunned the traditional schools, named Katsuichi; Koji figured he should have won easily, but was beaten three times. Humiliated, Koji realized that he was a victim of hubris, so he left his school and went on a training pilgrimage until he was good enough to challenge Katsuichi again. At Kitanoji Temple, he got his rematch, but fell again, for the last time. A true samurai to the end, he was well respected even by Usagi and Katsuichi, and earned the admiration of young Jotaro. In turn, the samurai bequeathed his daisho to the rabbit to wield when he comes of age.
- Neko Ninjas – The Neko Ninjas (lit. cat ninjas) are one of three major ninja clans, the others being the mogura (mole) ninja and the komori ninja (bat ninja). The neko ninja possess martial arts skills and secret techniques, such as access to explosives, beyond what the other clans have, but this is due to the neko ninja being the "normal" ninja clan, while the others have special abilities unique to them; the mogura ninja launch sneak attacks by digging through the ground, and the komori ninja can fly and launch aerial attacks. The Neko clan is currently fractured due to a power struggle between Kagemaru and Chizu. Though Kagemaru is acting head of the Neko Ninjas, there are a handful who are still loyal to Chizu even though she is exiled and still recognize her as leader. Neither of them can claim full control of the Neko Ninja Clan until one of them is dead.
  - Shingen – He was kashira (leader) of the neko ninja and was a master of his craft. He first appeared in Vol.1 #12 where he was on a mission to steal a Muramasa sword from Lord Noriyuki. His skill was so refined that when he was speared in his hiding place by Tomoe Ame who sensed an intruder, he still escaped detection by refraining from crying out in pain at the wound and wiping the spearhead clean as Tomoe withdrew to remove evidence. However, after getting the sword, he was found by Miyamoto Usagi, who followed him and tricked the ninja out of the sword. In the "Dragon Bellow Conspiracy" storyline, Shingen and the Neko Ninja join forces with Usagi to stop the powerhungry Lord Tamakuro from usurping the shogun's position. Shingen is mortally wounded in the struggle, but manages to eradicate Tamakuro as well when he blows up the lord's gunpowder and teppo supplies in his presence.
  - Kagemaru – An upstart chunin of the Neko Ninja who is loyal to Lord Hikiji. After Chizu's failure to procure the sword Grasscutter, he received the favor of Lord Hebi in becoming head of the clan, although he cannot rightfully assume the position until Chizu is dead.
  - Kimi – A young genin and one of the few in the Neko Clan who still remain loyal to Chizu after her violent ousting.
- Nezumi – Nezumi ("Rat") is a cheeky master thief and acrobat, and Inspector Ishida's particular nemesis. He steals from the rich and gives part of his loot to the poor, which has rendered him a popular folk hero. He also prides himself as a thief and not a murderer, and is careful not to leave anyone injured or dead; a factor which has earned him Ishida's grudging respect. In turn, Nezumi respects Ishida for his sense of justice, and has even assisted him several times, although he will not allow himself to be taken into custody even by him. For weapons, Nezumi uses a tanto and hanafuda cards, which he can use as thrown projectiles. Nezumi is patterned after the legendary Japanese thief Nezumi Kozo.
- Junior Inspector Nii – Inspector Ishida's deputy, who lacks the insight of his superior, but is still a dedicated and capable policeman.
- Noriko – The disguised sister of Tomoe Ame who considers herself a superior fighter to her sibling, yet for a time, she claimed to be her cousin rather than her sister (Both are technically true. Noriko's parents are Tomoe's father and Tomoe's maternal aunt). She grew away from her family to become a warrior notorious for her murderously sadistic viciousness which made her known as "The Blood Princess". She eventually led a plot of mining a secret gold mine with slave labor in Geishu territory to provide a pretext for another clan to invade. She enslaved Tomoe and Usagi in her plot, but they later escaped with the slaves to foil her plans. She apparently died when she deliberately fled into the mine with a gunpowder cache which exploded. However, Tomoe later had a disturbing dream where she witnessed Noriko escaping the cave with considered effort and vowing revenge. The question of whether that vision actually depicted an actual event is unanswered for now.
- Noriyuki – Noriyuki is the current daimyō of the Geishu Clan's province. Although still a young panda cub, he has proven extraordinarily capable in his position for his age for the intricate task of rule while still keeping his innocent spirit. This includes some developing physical skills such as being able to sense an intruder in his chambers even when asleep and to wake up quickly and yet subtly enough to launch an attack. His closest advisor is Tomoe Ame, a female feline samurai with extraordinary skill which she demonstrated when she saved him and his mother from a ninja assassination attempt. For that spectacular display of skill, Noriyuki's mother appointed Tomoe as her son's personal bodyguard, a position she still holds today. His personal appeal has also been a factor in reducing internal schisms in his clan such as when he inadvertently met the hiding rebel, General Ikeda, and reconciled with him for his role in an earlier insurrection. This extended to Ikeda protecting the lord from assassins and Noriyuki offered to reinstate him to his former rank. Ikeda declined and offered the compromise of his son, Motokazu, joining Noriyuki's court when he came of age after his father trained him. Although Ikeda later died in battle, Noriyuki was better than his word in bringing Motokazu into his household early to eventually become his personal page and later promoted the valiant cub to samurai. Unfortunately, Noriyuki has proven as gullible about mistreating Tomoe as his mother. A villainous adviser, wishing to get the female warrior (who learned of his treacherous nature in a dream) out of the way, has advised that she be married. The young panda accepted that advice without asking Tomoe if she desired it, making the marriage an unwanted imposition. Whether or not Noriyuki will realize that he is being unfair and be able to release her is unknown for now.
- General Oyaneko – A samurai who served Lord Hirone and friend of Yagi, but is now the magistrate of a small town. He is dying from an illness when Usagi comes through town, and Oyaneko challenges him to a duel, hoping to die in battle, instead of wasting away; Usagi convinces him to live on and serve his people until his death. He died one week after finishing an irrigation canal.
- Sanshobo – Sanshobo (formerly Inushiro), a samurai and hatamoto of General Ikeda (see above), lost the son of a friend to an accident, and in order to atone for his father's inability to save him, Sanshobo's own son killed himself as well. In grief over this two-fold loss, Sanshobo retired from his position and became a bonze (monk).
- Sasuké – Sasuké is an anthropomorphic fox, a demon hunter and skilled swordsman and archer who practices maho (sorcery). He has devoted his life to hunting demons (hence the title of Demon Queller). Sasuké has no known friends, except for his ghostly mentor, Lord Shoki (see below); he makes allegiances whenever he must, but is quite willing to do things alone if necessary. He is excessively professional, and many consider him cold and heartless as a result; Miyamoto Usagi prefers not to associate with him beyond the occasions when they happen to face a common enemy, partially due to the fact that Usagi often feels outclassed against Sasuké's enemies, who are supernatural in nature. However, Usagi's respect for his dedication has risen upon one of their encounters which ended with the mage temporarily aged and drained after a hard battle, but still determined to continue when ordered by Shoki to confront his next menace. In the graphic novel Usagi Yojimbo: Yokai, Sasuké reveals that he is over six hundred years old, despite looking around the same age as Usagi; it is also revealed that he had a wife named Harumi and a daughter named Hanako, but that his wife turned into a yokai after Hanako died.
- Shi – A quartet of assassins; the name is fitting because it means "4" or "death", depending on how it is written. Each member specialized in a weapon: the sword, the bow and arrow, the spear, and the kusarigama (sickle and chain). Together they are virtually invincible, but Usagi manages to defeat them by separating them and taking them out one at a time. The spear-wielder survives the fight and seeks revenge, only to be killed by Usagi on their next encounter.
- Shoki the Demon Queller - The ghost of a legendary demon hunter from the past, and Sasuke's mentor, who appears often to lead his pupil to the next demonic evil to vanquish.
- Shunji – One of Katsuichi's students; Shunji and his brother Shunichi found Katsuichi after he fell off a cliff after an ambush, and nursed him back to health. As payback, Katsuichi agreed to take the two brothers on as his students. Shunichi was later slain by a wandering ronin who duelled other fighters for a living, and Katsuichi eventually found Shunji's talents to be incompatible with his teaching style and so sent Shunji to train with an old friend of his.
- Sojobo - A tengu swordsmaster living in the mountains near Katsuichi's abode who lost his left hand to an attack of guhin tengu; this defeat made him an exile from his tribe. Katsuichi once fought and defeated him, thereby learning the secret of Tengu swordsmanship. In his impulsive youth, Usagi challenged him and nearly lost his hand to him when Katsuichi intervened. When Usagi interrupted their duel, Sojobo let them both leave out of respect for Usagi's courage. After Usagi entered Lord Mifune's service, he returned one more time to ask Sojobo to teach him about the ways of the sword; he lost, but was allowed to keep his hand in return for a future service. When his wife Nozomi, who has led their clan in his absence, is slain in battle against the guhin intruding into her people's mountain domain, she asks Sojobo to return and reassume his place as leader of their tribe. Sojobo is patterned after the tengu king Sōjōbō from Japanese folklore.
- Takenoko – A physician and genius inventor with a mind far ahead of its time, although it goes unappreciated by most of his peers, Usagi being the most notable exception. Takenoko was first introduced (by way of a descendant) in a short story meant as a teaser for Space Usagi in the Mirage Teenage Mutant Ninja Turtles comics, before he was formally integrated into the main comic line. He also plays a keyrole in the plot of Senso, where he manages to analyze and re-create a war machine to combat the alien invaders.
- Toady – Toady, also known as The Snitch, is a cowardly sycophant who concerns himself only with personal monetary benefits. Like the husband and wife woodcutters, he appears mainly as a generic commoner that interacts with several of the characters, both major or minor. It is unclear of what species he is, as he wears a hood that shadows the top half of his face (he is portrayed as a toad in the series of Space Usagi). He has bumped into Usagi on several occasions, but he once tried to assassinate Usagi for a reward, which turned out unsuccessful thanks to Inazuma and sent him fleeing for his life (although Usagi never actually saw him). To get money, he would even turn against anyone who have just paid him for information themselves.
- Toda Buichi – A trusted general in the army of Lord Mifune, Usagi's master. During the battle of Adachigahara he betrayed Mifune in favor of Lord Hikiji, which enabled Hikiji to win the battle. Hikiji did not reward Toda for his assistance, but rather beat and banished him. Left with nothing, Toda eventually devolved into a goblin who fed on passersby until Usagi avenged his betrayal.
- Tokage – Tokages are dinosaur-like lizards that roam about freely in Usagi's world. They are omnivorous, scavenging on any plant or animal matter. Some live in groups while others live alone. While most of them are wild, some were kept as pets. Usagi once had a tokage he named Spot who accompanied him on part of his journey and later joined with Zato-Ino. He later died while trying to protect Zato-Ino. Jotaro also kept one just like his father and gave him the same name as well.
  A tokage appeared in 2003 Teenage Mutant Ninja Turtles episode "The Real World, Part I" right in front of Leonardo when he wakes up. They also appear in the episodes "Yojimbo" and "Osoroshi no Tabi" of the 2012 CGI series.
- Usagi's Father – The former head of Usagi's home village. He was a stern rabbit who is never shown smiling, although he had enough warmth to welcome his son back in the midst of battle when he arrived to help his village when beset by brigands. Usagi's father died at the hands of Lord Hikiji when he refused to hand over supplies that could not be spared to the villainous daiymo just prior to the Battle of Adachi Plain. It later becomes known that he had a younger sister, whose son, Yukichi, would eventually meet and join up with his cousin Usagi.
- Husband and Wife Woodcutters – A pair of woodcutters who occasionally appear as background characters, or as generic commoners that some of the main cast interact with; very rarely do their jobs as woodcutters come into play, but on one occasion, Usagi planted a Muramasa sword on them and took a piece of wood as a decoy. They also witnessed Gen take down his first criminals and mentioned that he could claim a reward for them, starting his career as a bounty hunter. They were originally intended to be human, but Sakai reconsidered and made them monkeys instead.
- Yagi and Gorogoro – Yagi is an anthropomorphic goat and a highly skilled assassin. His most recognizable trait is that he carries his son, Gorogoro, with him in a baby carriage. He was once an honorable samurai, and despite his dark path, Yagi still considers himself an honorable warrior, and will not accept jobs that target innocent or honest people, although he charges a high fee for his services. He was once a high-ranking samurai who served Lord Hirone, but a corrupt councillor, Lord Wakame, framed him for treason; instead of committing seppuku to preserve his honor, Yagi left, taking Gorogoro with him. Yagi and Gorogoro are often referred to as the Lone Goat and Kid; Yagi is a skilled swordsman, while Gorogoro aids his father by attacking enemies with various weapons concealed in the cart. To signal one's intent to hire them, a person posts a picture of a baby carriage. Yagi and Gorogo are based on Ogami Ittō and Daigoro of Lone Wolf and Cub.
- Zato-Ino – An anthropomorphic pig who was born blind and learned to get by using his superior sense of smell; limited by his blindness, he became a zato ("blind masseur"). In order to protect himself from ridicule, he learned to use the sword, but upon killing his first tormentor, he was branded a murderer and was constantly hounded by bounty hunters. Upon his first clash with Miyamoto Usagi, Zato-Ino lost his nose and was forced to wear a wooden prosthesis in its place. Just before a later encounter, Zato-Ino was saved from an ambush by Usagi's tokage companion Spot, which made them both abandon their vendetta. While later helping Usagi, Gennosuke and the Neko Ninja during the Dragon Bellow Conspiracy story arc, Zato-Ino took an arquebuse bullet meant for Gennosuke, who took Zato-Ino to safety as a gesture of gratitude. Zato-Ino made his way to an isolated village which did not know about his past and took him in as one of their own, giving him a place to settle down at last.
  Zato-Ino is based on Zatoichi, a fictional Japanese blind masseuse swordsman. According to preliminary plot sketches by Sakai, Zato-Ino's grown daughter was planned to make an appearance in the limited series Senso. She is later introduced under the name Ichiko in the crossover miniseries Teenage Mutant Ninja Turtles/Usagi Yojimbo: WhereWhen.
