= One Day at a Time =

One Day at a Time may refer to:

== Television series ==
- One Day at a Time (1975 TV series), an American sitcom that ran from 1975 to 1984
- One Day at a Time (2017 TV series), the Netflix (and Pop) reboot of the 1970s–1980s sitcom

== Music ==
=== Albums ===
- One Day at a Time (Joan Baez album), 1970
- One Day at a Time (Cristy Lane album), 1981
- One Day at a Time, 1997 mini-album by Symposium
- One Day at a Time, 1999 album by Foster and Allen

=== Songs ===
- "One Day at a Time", a song written and performed by Willie Nelson on his albums Country Willie: His Own Songs (1965), Country Music Concert (1966), Willie and Family Live (1978), and Me & Paul (1985), and recorded by Joan Baez on her album cited above
- "One Day at a Time", a 1970 song written by Joe Babcock, first performed by Porter Wagoner & Dolly Parton on the album Once More
- "One Day (At a Time)", a song by John Lennon on the 1973 album Mind Games
- "One Day at a Time", a song written by Terry Cashman and Tommy West and performed by The Partridge Family on their 1973 album Crossword Puzzle
- "One Day at a Time" (song), 1974 country/Christian song written by Marijohn Wilkin and Kris Kristofferson, recorded by many artists
- "One Day at a Time", a song written by Robert Wright and Verdine White and performed by R&B band Pockets on their 1977 album Come Go with Us
- "One Day at a Time", a song by The Knack on their 2001 album Normal as the Next Guy
- "One Day at a Time", a song by Jeremy Camp on his 2002 album Stay
- "One Day at a Time (Em's Version)", 2004 single by 2Pac with Eminem featuring Outlawz
- "One Day at a Time", a song written and performed by Deana Carter on her 2005 album The Story of My Life (Deana Carter album)
- "One Day at a Time", a song by Jonas Brothers on their 2006 album It's About Time
- "One Day at a Time", a song by Enrique Iglesias on his 2010 album Euphoria
- "One Day at a Time", a song by Joe Walsh on his 2012 album Analog Man
- "One Day at a Time", a song by Lynyrd Skynyrd on their 2012 album Last of a Dyin' Breed
- "One Day at a Time", a song by Ateez on their 2020 EP Zero: Fever Part.1

== Books ==
- One Day at a Time (novel), 2009 novel by Danielle Steel
- One Day at a Time, 2011 childhood memoir by Susan Lewis

== See also ==
- One Step at a Time (disambiguation)
