= One Day =

One Day or 1 Day may refer to:

== Film and television ==
- One Day (1991 film), a British television film by Helen Edmundson in the anthology series ScreenPlay
- One Day, a 2007 film featuring Hayley Carmichael
- 1 Day, a 2009 British film
- One Day (2010 film), a Taiwanese film starring Chang Shu-hao
- One Day (2011 film), an adaptation of David Nicholls's novel (see below), directed by Lone Scherfig
- One Day (2016 film), a Thai film by Banjong Pisanthanakun
- One Day (2017 film), a South Korean film by Lee Yoon-ki
- One Day: Justice Delivered, a 2019 Indian Hindi film directed by Ashok Nanda
- One Day: Wonderful Christmas Ado, a 2023 Japanese television series starring Kazunari Ninomiya, Miki Nakatani and Takao Osawa
- One Day (TV series), a 2024 Netflix series based on an adaptation of David Nicholls's novel

== Literature ==
- One Day (novel), a 2009 novel by David Nicholls

== Theater ==
- One Day (musical), a 2026 musical based on the 2009 novel

== Music ==
=== Bands ===
- One Day (Australian band), an Australian hip hop collective
- One Day (South Korean band), a 10-member South Korean band, split into bands 2AM and 2PM

=== Albums ===
- One Day (Klymaxx album) or the title song, 1994
- One Day (Northern Lights album) or the title song, 2008
- One Day (Peter Toussaint album), 2017
- One Day (Fucked Up album), 2023
- One Day, by Maximilian Hecker, 2009
- One Day (single album), by One, 2017

=== Songs ===
- "One Day" (2AM and 2PM song), 2012
- "One Day" (Arash song), 2014
- "One Day" (Caro Emerald song), 2013
- "One Day" (Charice song), 2011
- "One Day" (Kodaline song), 2014
- "One Day" (Logic song), 2018
- "One Day" (Mariette song), 2023
- "One Day" (Matisyahu song), 2008
- "One Day" (Opshop song), 2007
- "One Day" (Vince Clarke and Paul Quinn song), 1985
- "One Day (Vandaag)", by Bakermat, 2012
- "One Day / Reckoning Song", a remix by Wankelmut of "Reckoning Song" by Asaf Avidan, 2012
- "Un Día (One Day)", by J Balvin, Dua Lipa, Bad Bunny and Tainy, 2020
- "One Day", by 2 Brothers on the 4th Floor, 1997
- "One Day", by Ace of Base from The Golden Ratio, 2010
- "One Day", by Björk from Debut, 1993
- "One Day", by Chris Isaak from Always Got Tonight, 2002
- "One Day", by Delta Goodrem from Delta, 2007
- "One Day", by Donna De Lory from In the Glow, 2003
- "One Day", by Electric Light Orchestra from Zoom, 2001
- "One Day", by Fabolous from Ghetto Fabolous, 2001
- "One Day", by Fishbone from Truth and Soul, 1988
- "One Day", by Genesis from From Genesis to Revelation, 1969
- "One Day", by the Guess Who from It's Time, 1966
- "One Day", by Imagine Dragons from Mercury – Act 1, 2021
- "One Day", by Kamelot from Siége Perilous (bonus track), 1998
- "One Day", by Kissing the Pink (KTP) from Certain Things Are Likely, 1986
- "One Day", by Kodaline from In a Perfect World, 2013
- "One Day", by Little River Band from The Net, 1983
- "One Day", by LMFAO from Sorry for Party Rocking, 2011
- "One Day", by Lovejoy, 2021
- "One Day", by Monsta X, 2021
- "One Day", by Nik Kershaw from To Be Frank, 2001
- "One Day", by O.A.R. from All Sides, 2008
- "One Day", by P.O.D. from Brown, 1996
- "One Day", by Raintime from Psychromatic, 2010
- "One Day", by Roger Daltrey from Parting Should Be Painless, 1984
- "One Day", by Simple Plan from No Pads, No Helmets...Just Balls, 2002
- "One Day", by Sissel Kyrkjebø from All Good Things, 2000
- "One Day", by Taeyeon from Something New, 2018
- "One Day", by Toby Lightman from Let Go, 2008
- "One Day", by TQ from The Second Coming, 2000
- "One Day", by Trading Yesterday, 2005
- "One Day", by UGK from Ridin' Dirty, 1996
- "One Day", by Uriah Heep from Sweet Freedom, 1973
- "One Day", by the Verve from Urban Hymns, 1997
- "One Day", by Waltari from Rare Species, 2004
- "One Day", by War of Ages from War of Ages, 2005
- "One Day", by Weki Meki from I Am Me., 2021
- "One Day", by Zac Brown Band from Jekyll + Hyde, 2015
- "One Day", from the film soundtrack album Pirates of the Caribbean: At World's End, 2007
- "One Day", a hymn written by John Wilbur Chapman, 1910
- "One Day (At a Time)", by John Lennon from Mind Games, 1973
- "One Day (I'm Gonna Make You Mine)", by Sheila E. from Sheila E., 1987

== See also ==
- One-day cricket or limited overs cricket
- A Day (disambiguation)
- One Day at a Time (disambiguation)
