= A Day =

A Day or A-Day may refer to:

- A day, one rotation of the Earth
- 20 October 1944, the day the Leyte Island Operation began
- A-Day (University of Alabama), an annual American college football exhibition game, established in 1946
- "A Day", a 1985 song by Clan of Xymox on their self-titled debut album, released as a single multiple times, and used on The Guest film soundtrack (2014)
- A-day (6 April 2006), the commencement of pension tax simplification in the UK
- A Day (film), a 2017 South Korean film
- "A Day", a 2017 episode of the American Netflix series Love

== See also ==
- One Day (disambiguation)
