= Bad Day =

Bad Day or Bad Days may refer to:

== Film and TV ==
- Bad Day (viral video), a viral Internet video
- Bad Day (2010 film), a direct-to-DVD film
- Bad Day (2026 film), American action comedy film starring Cameron Diaz
- "Bad Day" (TMNT 2003 Episode), a 2005 episode of Teenage Mutant Ninja Turtles
- "A Bad Day", an episode of the TV series Pocoyo

== Music ==
- "Bad Day" (Daniel Powter song), 2005
- "Bad Day" (Fuel song), 2001
- "Bad Day" (Justin Bieber song), 2013
- "Bad Day" (R.E.M. song), 2003
- "Bad Day", by Blackbear from Misery Lake, 2021
- "Bad Day", by Blur from Leisure, 1991
- "Bad Day", by Carmel from The Drum Is Everything, 1983
- "Bad Day", by Juliana Hatfield from Bed, 1998
- "Bad Days", by Moby from Ambient
- "Bad Days", by the Flaming Lips from Clouds Taste Metallic
- "Bad Days", by Space from Tin Planet
- "Bad Days", by Tove Lo from Blue Lips
