= Teenage Mutant Ninja Turtles (2003 TV series) season 4 =

Teenage Mutant Ninja Turtles
- Season 4
- No. of episodes: 26

Release
- Original network: 4Kids TV
- Original release: September 10, 2005 – April 15, 2006

Season chronology
- ← Previous; Season 3 Next → Ninja Tribunal

The fourth season of Teenage Mutant Ninja Turtles originally aired between September 10, 2005 and April 15, 2006, beginning with the "Cousin Sid" episode. Fourteen random episodes from this season were released on DVD on September 12, 2006. Much of this season focused on Leonardo, the group's leader, who became bitter, reserved and isolated following the final episode of the previous season in which he, his brothers and their master were almost killed. He went so far as to lash out at Splinter, causing him serious injury. This season is known among fans as the darkest season of the series.

== Story ==
In the wake of their final battle with the Shredder, the Turtles retreat to the Jones family farmhouse to rest and recuperate, still heavily wounded and scarred. Leonardo in particular carries strong emotional scars from the battle, blaming himself for his family having to nearly sacrifice their lives to stop the Shredder. After the Turtles return to New York, they find that Hun has defected from the Foot Clan, instead returning to the Purple Dragons and transforming them from a street gang to a sophisticated crime organization. A successful raid on an Earth Protection Force train ends up being the final straw for the President of the United States, who threatens to cut the organization's funding for their repeated recent failures. Desperate to keep his organization afloat, Bishop engineers a staged alien invasion with man-made "aliens", which successfully convinces the President of his organization's value to protect the Earth. Unknown to Bishop, however, the residue from the destroyed alien clones leaks into New York City's sewers, and after coming into contact with local fauna, mutates them, triggering a massive mutant outbreak. During this outbreak, Baxter Stockman finally clones a new human body for himself, but it along with his sanity deteriorates, and he eventually drowns in the Hudson River while attacking April O'Neil. Nevertheless, Bishop brings him back from the dead in another cyborg body, deeming him too useful to lose.

In the meantime, Leo's emotional scars drive him to become progressively more hostile and surly to the point of wounding Splinter in an uncontrollable rage during a training session. Splinter sends Leo on a pilgrimage to the Ancient One, Hamato Yoshi's own master and father figure. The Ancient One is able to heal Leo's deep self-doubt and psychological scars, and takes the turtle under his wing. Back in New York, Karai takes up the Shredder's mantle, and rebuilds the Foot Clan to become a much more powerful organization, and with the help of the Foot Mystics, find the Turtles' lair and destroy it. Raphael, Michelangelo, Donatello, Splinter, and Klunk fake their deaths as they go into hiding. The Ancient One, having foreseen the attack, sends Leo back to New York, where he reunites his family and finds them a new home before defeating Karai, vowing that any further conflict between their clans will result in her death.

The Turtles struggle to fight Bishop's mutant outbreak, but things take a turn for the worse when Donnie is infected with the chemical agent responsible for the outbreak, mutating him once again. Leatherhead reports that Bishop's chemical agent is reacting violently with the Utrom mutagen already in his body, and will kill him in a matter of days. The group heads to Area 51 to ask for Bishop's aid in returning their brother to normal. Bishop agrees, but charges the Turtles with retrieving the Heart of Tengu, a relic possessed by Karai that an unknown entity has promised will grant him centuries of advancement in technology. The Turtles fulfill the agreement, and thanks to Leatherhead and Stockman's joint effort, cure Don and return him to normal. Meanwhile, Bishop inadvertently destroys the Heart of Tengu, having been fooled into doing so by the entity, who is revealed to be the Water Foot Mystic. The Heart of Tengu was an artifact that enabled the leaders of the Foot Clan to keep the Foot Mystics under their control. Now free, the Foot Mystics resolve to revive the "one, true Shredder".

In the season finale, the Turtles find themselves abducted by the mysterious Ninja Tribunal, along with four other warriors from across the globe. The 8 warriors are informed they are being drafted to combat a great evil that is poised to return, and they are taken to the Tribunal's monastery in Japan after passing their first test of character.

== Cast ==
=== Main ===
- Michael Sinterniklaas as Leonardo: the leader of the Turtles who is mentally wounded and becomes very bitter after the Shredder's defeat. (26 episodes)
- Sam Riegel as Donatello: the Turtles' genius engineer who is identified as the member who holds the team together. He suffers from a second mutation caused by the mutant outbreak, which is the cause for the final events of the season and, indirectly, for the events of the next season. (25 episodes (appears only in his non-speaking second mutation form in episode 24))
- Frank Frankson as Raphael: The most stubborn and temperamental of the four turtles who wields twin sai and a red mask. (Appears in 25 episodes.)
- Wayne Grayson as Michelangelo: the Turtles' and wise guy and a large source of comic relief who wields twin nunchucks and an orange mask. (Appears in 25 episodes.)

=== Supporting ===
- Darren Dunstan as Splinter: the Turtles' sensei and adopted father, who comes to realize his destiny as a guardian of the Utroms. (17 episodes)
- Veronica Taylor as April: an ally of the Turtles who enters a relationship with Casey. (14 episodes)
- Marc Thompson as:
  - Casey: an ally of the Turtles who enters a relationship with April. (12 episodes)
  - The Ultimate Daimyo: a warrior king who hosts a tournament of the multiverse's greatest warriors every 3 years.
- Gary K. Lewis as Leatherhead: a mutant alligator who is a loyal ally of the Turtles. (3 episodes)
- Liza Jacqueline as Renet: a time travelling apprentice who befriended the Turtles after accidentally arriving in their dimension and stopping Savanti Romero. (2 episodes)
- Oliver Wyman as Gyoji: the referee of the Battle Nexus.
- Sean Schemmel as Nobody: an superhero and an ally of the Turtles.
- Jason Griffith as Miyamoto Usagi: an ally of the Turtles and a close friend to Leonardo who Splinter asked to help Leo to become more expressive about his feelings.
- Eric Stuart as Murakami Gennosuke: an ally of the Turtles.
- David Chen as The Ancient One: an old ninjutsu master who taught Hamato Yoshi and helps Leonardo overcome his fears. (4 episodes)

=== Villains ===
- Karen Neill as Karai: the Shredder's adopted daughter and second-in-command, whose allegiance and devoted service come into question, as Leonardo tries to convince her to change sides. After the defeat of Ch'rell the last season finale, Karai vows to avenge him taking the mantle of the Shredder and serving as one of the two main antagonists of season 4. (6 episodes)
- David Zen Mansley as:
  - John Bishop: a black ops agent in charge of the Earth Protection Force, an organization devoted to defending Earth from alien invasion. He plays a central role in the season serving as one of the two main antagonists, after the Shredder's defeat. (8 episodes)
  - Savanti Romero: a time travelling apprentice who was turned into a demon by lord Simultaneous and banished as punishment for trying to seize the time scepter. After trying to do so again, he was banished yet again to the prehistoric Earth where he tried to prevent the dinosaur's extinction. (2 episodes)
- Scott Williams as Stockman: a brilliant scientist who allies himself with Bishop to get revenge on the Turtles. (8 episodes)
- Greg Carey as Hun: a hulking gangster who is a former member of the Foot and the leader of the Purple Dragons, who tries to increase their reputation after the Shredder's defeat. (5 episodes)

=== Recurring ===
- Scottie Ray as Ch'rell / The Shredder: the main antagonist of the series and leader of the Foot Clan. He was defeated and imprisoned by the Utrom Council on an ice asteroid for eternity. He only appears in the season in flashbacks or as an illusion. (3 episodes (has no lines in episode 19))
- Dan Green as Mortu: the leader of the benevolent Utroms.
- Eric Stuart as Hamato Yoshi: Splinter's owner.
- Sean Schemmel as Yukio Mashimi: the former friend and enemy of Hamato Yoshi.
- Karen Neill as Tang Shen: the love interest of Hamato Yoshi.

== Crew ==
Teenage Mutant Ninja Turtles was produced by Mirage Studios, 4 Kids Entertainment, 4Kids Productions, and Dong Woo Animation and distributed by 4 Kids Entertainment and was aired on Fox's Saturday morning kids' block in the US. The producers were Gary Richardson, Frederick U. Fierst, and Joellyn Marlow for the American team. Tae Ho Han was the producer for the Korean team.

== Episodes ==
| No. overall | No. in season | Title | Directed by | Written by | Original release date | Prod. code |
|---|---|---|---|---|---|---|
| 79 | 1 | "Cousin Sid" | Roy Burdine | Christopher Yost | September 10, 2005 | S04E01 |
With their bodies bruised and their spirits wounded (most severely Leonardo), the gang returns to the countryside to heal. Unfortunately, their recuperation is interrupted when Casey's cousin, Sid, shows up demanding money, which he needs to repay a debt to the Purple Dragons.
| 80 | 2 | "The People's Choice" | Roy Burdine | Baz Hawkins | September 17, 2005 | S04E02 |
The Turtles go on a camping trip in the forest and explore an abandoned sawmill. Their sojourn is interrupted by an extraterrestrial mech that crashes into the nearby lake. The Turtles meet an alien, Jhanna, who is nominated to fight the corrupt Moriah in fair combat. When Moriah arrives on Earth, bringing with her an unfair advantage, the Turtles rush to Jhanna's aid. Meanwhile at the farm, Casey struggles to express his true feelings for April.
| 81 | 3 | "A Wing and a Prayer" | Roy Burdine | Baz Hawkins | September 24, 2005 | S04E03 |
During a night-time training exercise on the rooftops of New York City, the Turtles are interrupted by two warring Avians, a race whose appearance resembles angels. The Turtles come to the aid of Raptarr, who is trying to stop the exiled Mephos from starting a civil war in the Avian city and conquering the Earth.
| 82 | 4 | "Sons of the Silent Age" | Roy Burdine | Steve Murphy | October 1, 2005 | S04E04 |
Still recovering in the countryside, the Turtles, April and Casey take a raft down the Connecticut River. April confronts Leonardo about his newfound ire and brooding attitude. As Leo expresses his resentment and shame from his last encounter with the Shredder, they are interrupted by a fish-like humanoid creature covered in radiation burns from a nearby nuclear power plant which possesses April's body and tells her of her past.
| 83 | 5 | "Dragon's Brew" | Roy Burdine | Michael Ryan | October 8, 2005 | S04E05 |
Hun returns to the Purple Dragons and heads a campaign hijacking weapons shipments. Leonardo's newfound fury leads him to recruit Casey to put a stop to these thefts, however, when the two confront the Purple Dragons after a train hijacking, they encounter a foe that is a danger to all of them. A monster known as, T-9581.: Note: This is the only episode where Raphael does not appear. This is also the second episode where Donatello and Michelangelo does not appear.
| 84 | 6 | "I, Monster" | Roy Burdine | Brandon Sawyer | October 15, 2005 | S04E06 |
The Turtles and Casey take their training to an abandoned brickworks and practice stealth in a game of hide and seek. Their training is soon interrupted by an enigmatic figure bandaged from head to toe. The man, who seems to have a special relationship with rats, attacks the team viciously and captures Michelangelo. Leonardo rambunctiously retaliates, to the chagrin of his brothers and Casey. Unbeknownst to them, the Turtles have played a large role in this stranger's dark past.
| 85 | 7 | "Grudge Match" | Roy Burdine | Christopher Yost | October 22, 2005 | S04E07 |
Michelangelo is challenged by his former Battle Nexus rival, Kluh, who feels that an interference during their final match gave Mikey an unfair opportunity to win. Given the fluke-like nature of his victory, Mikey turns to Leonardo for help in training him to deal with an opponent twice his size. Despite his claims of unfairness, Kluh's father places a spell on the Battle Nexus to ensure that the rematch is a mortal combat.
| 86 | 8 | "All Hallows Thieves" | Roy Burdine | Gavin Hignight | October 29, 2005 | S04E08 |
The Turtles are preparing to celebrate Halloween—one of the few times in the year where they can be seen in public. When costumed thieves steal a statue from April's antique shop, the Turtles put aside their jack-o'-lanterns and pursue them. This theft is part of a bigger plan by a sorcerer, the King of Thieves, who plans to use the statue to unleash a legion of minions on the city. When the Turtles come to disrupt his plans, the sorcerer summons the Thievery God, bringing the statue to life; it then sets out to destroy the Turtles.
| 87 | 9 | "Bad Day" | Roy Burdine | Brandon Sawyer | November 5, 2005 | S04E09 |
During a meditation session, Master Splinter's sudden collapse is the first of a nightmarish chain of events, which force the Turtles to face death, destruction, and tragedy. Matters become worse as they come face-to-face with their most contentious foes, who, forming an alliance, seek to break the Turtles' spirits.
| 88 | 10 | "Aliens Among Us" | Roy Burdine | Christopher Yost | November 12, 2005 | S04E10 |
When the president threatens to cut the funding of the Earth Protection Force, Agent Bishop engineers an alien invasion to attack the president during a press conference before a meeting at the United Nations.
| 89 | 11 | "Dragons Rising" | Roy Burdine | Michael Ryan | November 19, 2005 | S04E11 |
As Hun expands the Purple Dragons' power via illicit arms trades, the Turtles and Casey Jones seek to stop him yet again. Leonardo continues to unduly press his brothers while Casey seeks revenge on Hun for causing a tragic event during his childhood.
| 90 | 12 | "Still Nobody" | Roy Burdine | Baz Hawkins | November 26, 2005 | S04E12 |
Nobody returns and reaches out to the Turtles and asks their help in stopping a new and violent street gang called the Turks.
| 91 | 13 | "Samurai Tourist" | Roy Burdine | Christopher Yost | December 3, 2005 | S04E13 |
Master Splinter invites Miyamoto Usagi—and the irresponsible, sloppy Murakami Gennosuke—from their dimension to Earth in the hopes that Usagi can speak to Leonardo about his wayward attitude. When Gen wanders off to explore downtown Manhattan, the Turtles, Usagi, and Casey set out to find him. Their search becomes complicated when an assassin, sent after Leonardo by Lord Hebi, follows Gen and Usagi to Earth.
| 92 | 14 | "The Ancient One" | Roy Burdine | Steve Murphy | December 10, 2005 | S04E14 |
When Leonardo's anger causes him to injure Splinter, he seeks redemption by travelling to Japan. There, he begins a quest to find the Ancient One, who once trained Splinter's sensei, Hamato Yoshi.
| 93 | 15 | "Scion of the Shredder" | Roy Burdine | Eugene Son | January 28, 2006 | S04E15 |
With Leonardo gone, Splinter, Raphael, Donatello, and Michelangelo witness the return of the Shredder (Karai). They are plunged into the fight of their lives as they ward off volleys of Foot Ninja and Foot Mechs that lay waste to their lair.
| 94 | 16 | "Prodigal Son" | Roy Burdine | Gavin Hignight | February 4, 2006 | S04E16 |
Leonardo returns home to find the lair in ruins and his family missing. His search for answers and his family eventually lead him to the realization that Karai is no longer an ally.
| 95 | 17 | "Outbreak" | Roy Burdine | Christopher Yost | February 11, 2006 | S04E17 |
Following the invasion engineered by Agent Bishop, genetic material from the replicated aliens combines with inhabitants of the sewers and surrounding waterways, causing a mutant outbreak. Fearing its spread, Bishop sends Baxter Stockman to contain the threat. Meanwhile, the Turtles search for items to furnish their new lair, but now must face the threat of attacking mutants.
| 96 | 18 | "Trouble with Augie" | Roy Burdine | Eugene Son | February 18, 2006 | S04E18 |
April discovers a distress signal from her Uncle Augie, who became trapped in another dimension years ago. She appeals to Donatello for help and they use April's puzzle cube to travel across the multiverse. They find Augie, along with his new lizard-like friends, the Brotherhood, who claim they wish to help the inhabitants of Earth. Unfortunately, they soon discover the Brotherhood's true aspirations are not so benevolent.
| 97 | 19 | "Insane in the Membrane" | Roy Burdine | Matthew Drdek | February 25, 2006 | S04E19 |
The mutant outbreak continues to spread throughout the sewers and subway tunnels while the Turtles try to contain the threat. Back at Area 51, Baxter Stockman prepares a new body for cerebral transfer despite warnings from Agent Bishop. When Stockman's body begins to show signs of rejection, he becomes delirious, which leads to a rampage against the person he believes to have caused all his problems, April O'Neil. In the end, seeing April as his mother due to his delusions, Stockman sacrifices himself by being drowned in the East River while handing her to the Turtles and Casey.
| 98 | 20 | "Tale of Master Yoshi" | Roy Burdine | Steve Murphy | March 4, 2006 | S04E20 |
When the power goes out in their lair, the Turtles and Splinter gather around the candlelight as Leonardo tells a story he learned from the Ancient One about Splinter's sensei, Hamato Yoshi.
| 99 | 21 | "Return of Savanti" | Roy Burdine | Christopher Yost | March 11, 2006 | S04E21 |
| 100 | 22 | "Return of Savanti" | Roy Burdine | Christopher Yost | March 18, 2006 | S04E22 |
Savanti Romero plots his revenge against the Turtles and Renet after they had him banished to the Cretaceous period. Using his magic to manipulate time, Romero lures the Turtles and Renet into a trap to obtain the time sceptre. Having been sent to the past, the Turtles and Renet battle with Savanti Romero and his telepathically controlled dinosaurs as Savanti attempts to change the historic timeline by preventing the dinosaur extinction event.
| 101 | 23 | "Adventures in Turtle Sitting" | Roy Burdine | Roland Gonzalez | March 25, 2006 | S04E23 |
The Turtles continue to deal with the seemingly unstoppable mutant outbreak, but they leave Donatello under care of April and Casey when he becomes very ill. However, Donnie's illness is not just a cold; he is in the final stages of a secondary mutation that will transform him into a savage beast, to which the other turtles and Leatherhead must work together to capture. Meanwhile, Bishop recovers Stockman's brain from the bottom of the East River and resurrects Stockman giving him the half monster, half cyborg body.
| 102 | 24 | "Good Genes" | Roy Burdine | Christopher Yost | April 1, 2006 | S04E24 |
| 103 | 25 | "Good Genes" | Roy Burdine | Christopher Yost | April 8, 2006 | S04E25 |
When it is apparent that Don's secondary mutation is causing his body to degenerate, the Turtles and Leatherhead agree they must go directly to Agent Bishop's headquarters to demand a cure. This scenario proves to be fortuitous as Bishop offers to help the Turtles if they retrieve an ancient piece of technology from the Foot known as the Heart of Tengu. The Turtles agree to Bishop's offer, but the retrieval of the Heart turns out to be the groundwork for a plan that even Bishop doesn't understand.
| 104 | 26 | "Ninja Tribunal" | Roy Burdine | Michael Ryan | April 15, 2006 | S04E26 |
Still recovering from Donnie's secondary mutation, he feels cooped up inside the new lair. To help him out, the other Turtles decide to take Don topside to get some much needed air. The Turtles are then ambushed and captured by masked wooden warriors. The Turtles arrive before the Ninja Tribunal, 4 beings with a great resemblance to the Shredder. Along with four other warriors, the Tribunal entreats the group for aid against a greater evil.
