= One Step at a Time =

One Step at a Time may refer to:

- One Step at a Time (album), a 1998 album by George Strait
- "One Step at a Time", a song by Buddy Jewell
- "One Step at a Time" (Brenda Lee song) (1957)
- "One Step at a Time" (Jordin Sparks song) (2008)
- One Step at a Time, a 2010 Francis Rossi album
- "One Step at a Time", a song by Hüsker Dü from Zen Arcade
- "One Step at a Time", a song by Jeff Lynne's ELO from Alone in the Universe (2015)
