= List of storms named Ma-on =

The name Ma-on (Cantonese: 馬鞍, [maː˨˧ ɔːn˥]) has been used to name four tropical cyclones in the western North Pacific Ocean. The name was contributed by Hong Kong and refers to Ma On Shan in Cantonese.

- Typhoon Ma-on (2004) (T0422, 26W, Rolly) – a Category 5 typhoon that made landfall on Japan's Izu Peninsula as a category 3, killing 6 people.
- Typhoon Ma-on (2011) (T1106, 08W, Ineng) – struck Shikoku in Japan before recurving to the open sea.
- Tropical Storm Ma-on (2016) (T1624, 27W) – stayed at sea through its duration.
- Severe Tropical Storm Ma-on (2022) (T2209, 10W, Florita) – affected northern Philippines, South China and northern Vietnam.

The name Ma-on was retired following the 2022 Pacific typhoon season and was replaced with Tsing-ma (Cantonese: 青馬, [t͡sʰiŋ˥ maː˨˧]), which refers to Tsing Ma Bridge in Cantonese.
