= Daishō =

Matched pair of Japanese samurai swords

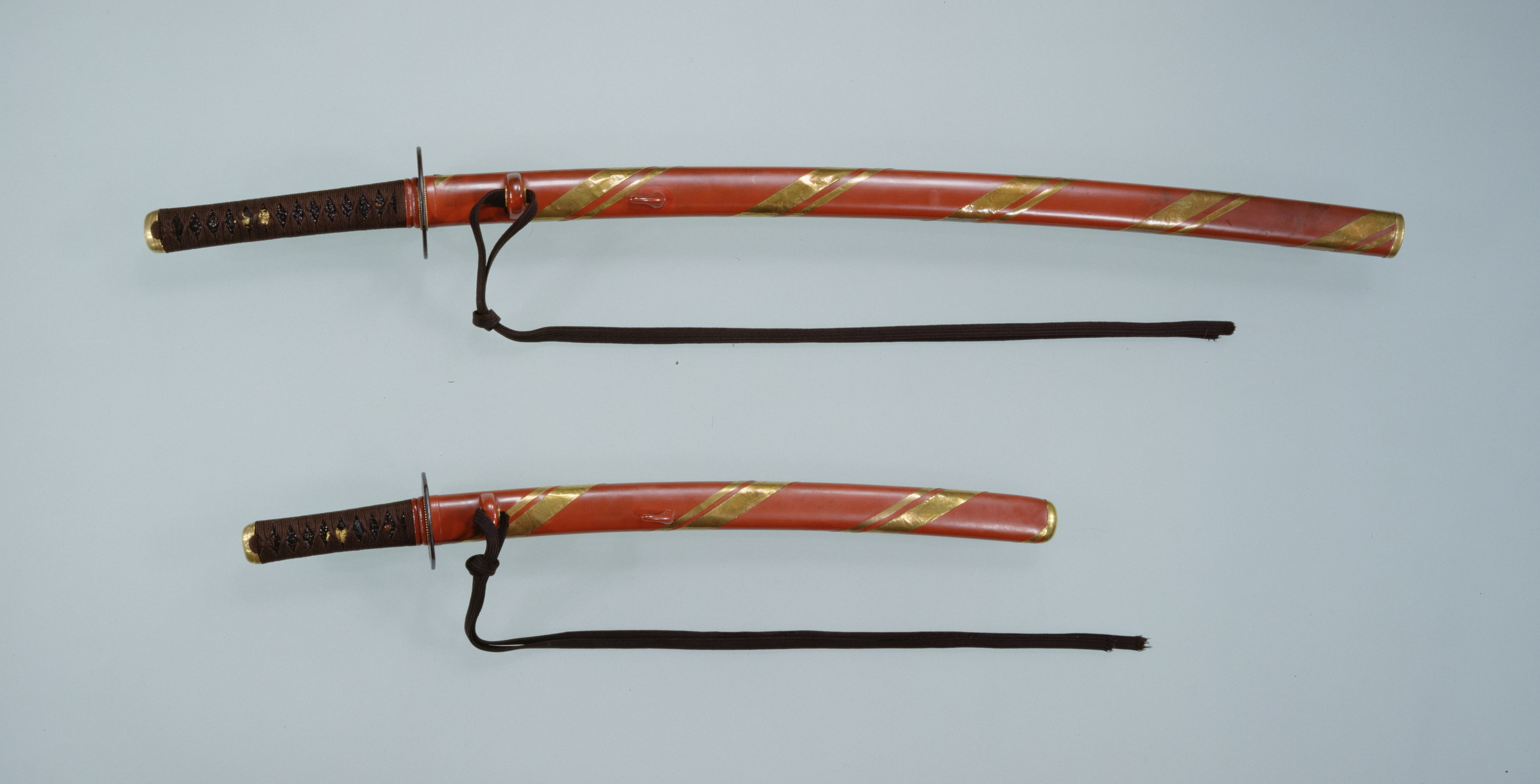
Daishō style sword mounting, gold banding on red-lacquered ground. 16th century, Azuchi–Momoyama period. Important Cultural Property. Tokyo National Museum.

The daishō (大小, daishō)—"large and small"—is a Japanese term for a matched pair of traditionally made Japanese swords (nihonto) worn by the samurai class in feudal Japan.

The etymology of the word daishō becomes apparent when the terms daitō, meaning long sword, and shōtō, meaning short sword, are used; daitō + shōtō = daishō. A daishō is typically depicted as a katana and wakizashi (or a tantō) mounted in matching koshirae, but originally the daishō was the wearing of any long and short katana together. The katana/wakizashi pairing is not the only daishō combination as generally any longer sword paired with a tantō is considered to be a daishō. Daishō eventually came to mean two swords having a matched set of fittings. A daishō could also have matching blades made by the same swordsmith, but this was in fact uncommon and not necessary for two swords to be considered to be a daishō, as it would have been more expensive for a samurai.

== History ==
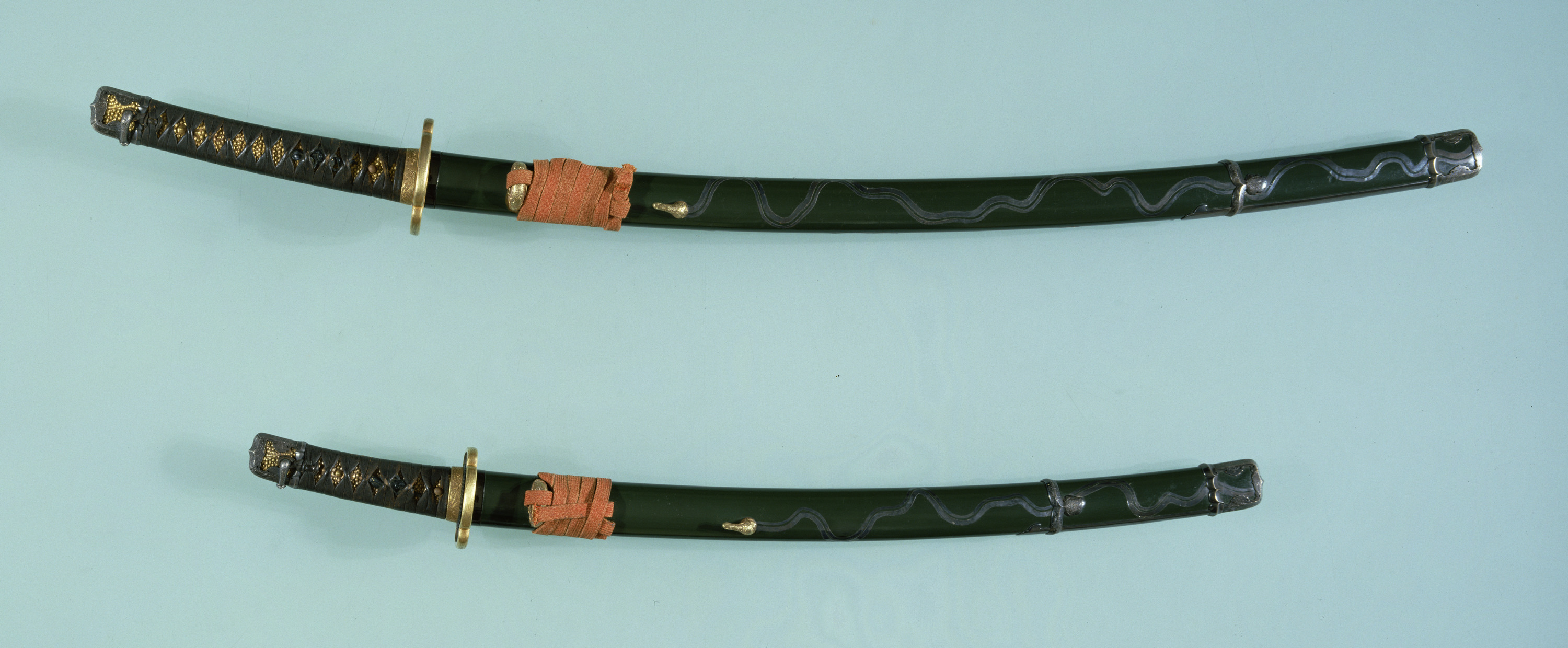
Daishō style handachi "half tachi" sword mounting, silver stream design on green lacquer ground. 16th–17th century, Azuchi Momoyama－Edo period. Tokyo National Museum.

The concept of the daisho originated with the pairing of a short sword with whatever long sword was being worn during a particular time period. The tachi would be paired with a tantō, and later the katana would be paired with another shorter katana called a chiisagatana. With the advent of the katana, the wakizashi eventually was chosen by samurai as the short sword over the tantō. Kanzan Satō, in his book titled The Japanese Sword, notes that there did not seem to be any particular need for the wakizashi and suggests that the wakizashi may have become more popular than the tantō as the wakizashi was more suited for indoor fighting. He mentions the custom of leaving the katana at the door of a castle or palace when entering while continuing to wear the wakizashi inside.

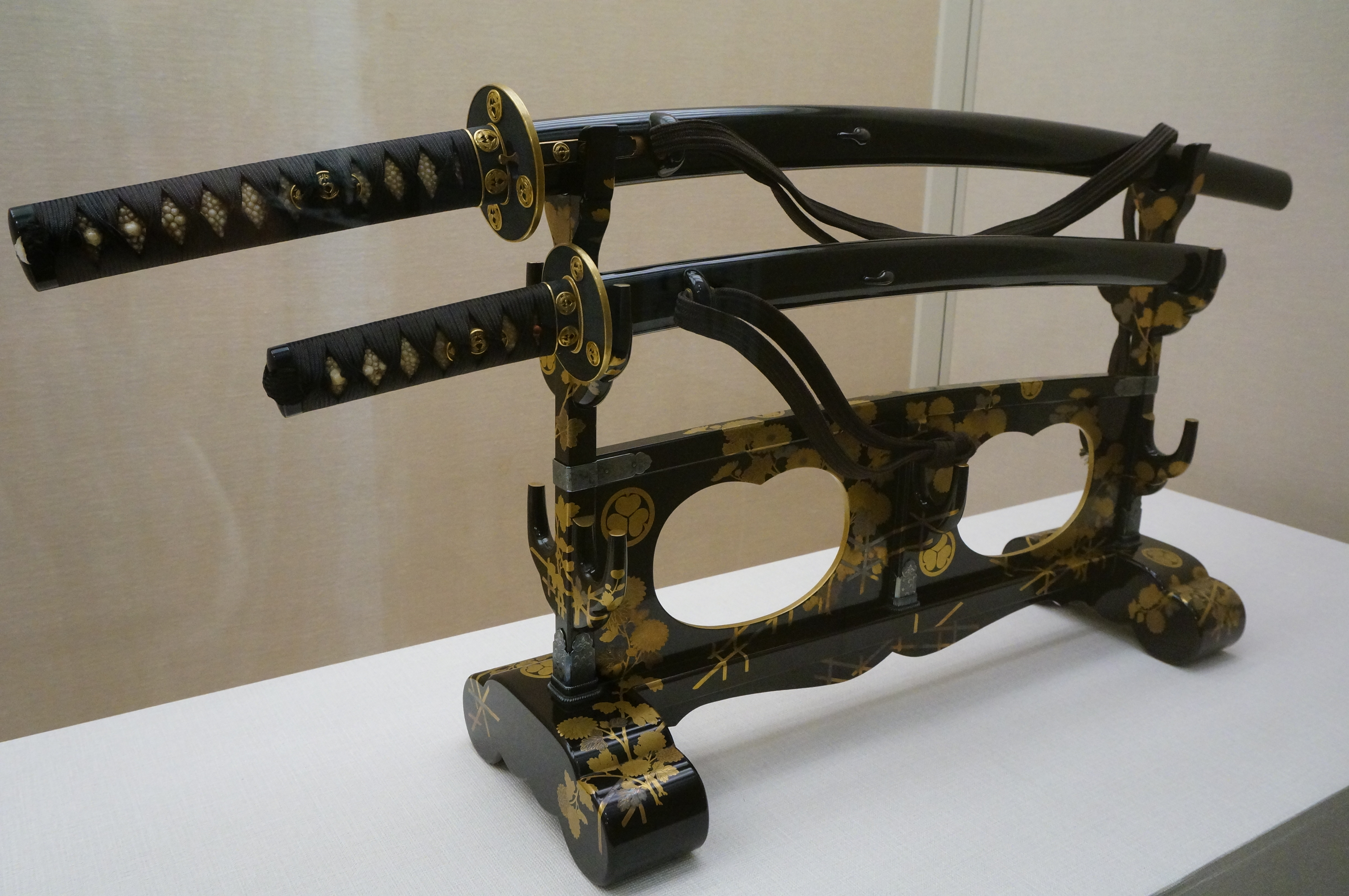
Daishō for formal attire with black scabbard, hilt winding thread and white ray skin hilt, which were regulated by the Tokugawa Shogunate. Daishō owned by Uesugi clan. Late Edo period.

Daishō may have become popular around the end of the Muromachi period (1336 to 1573) as several early examples date from the late 16th century. An edict in 1629 defining the duties of a samurai required that daishō be worn when on official duty. Wearing daishō was limited to the samurai class in 1683, and became a symbol of their rank Samurai could wear decorative swords in daily life, but the Tokugawa shogunate regulated the appearance of swords for formal attire such as when samurai came to a castle. The daisho for formal attire was limited to the scabbard and winding thread in solid black, and the hilt wrapped with white ray skin.

According to most traditional kenjutsu schools, only one sword of the daisho would have been used in combat. However, in the first half of the 17th century, the famous swordsman Miyamoto Musashi promoted the use of a one-handed grip, which allowed both swords to be used simultaneously. This technique, called nitōken, is a main element of the Niten Ichi-ryū style of swordsmanship that Musashi founded.

During the Meiji period an edict was passed in 1871 abolishing the requirement that daishō be worn by samurai, and in 1876 wearing swords in public by most of Japan's population was banned; thus ended the use of the daishō as the symbol of the samurai. The samurai class was abolished soon after the sword ban.

== Gallery ==
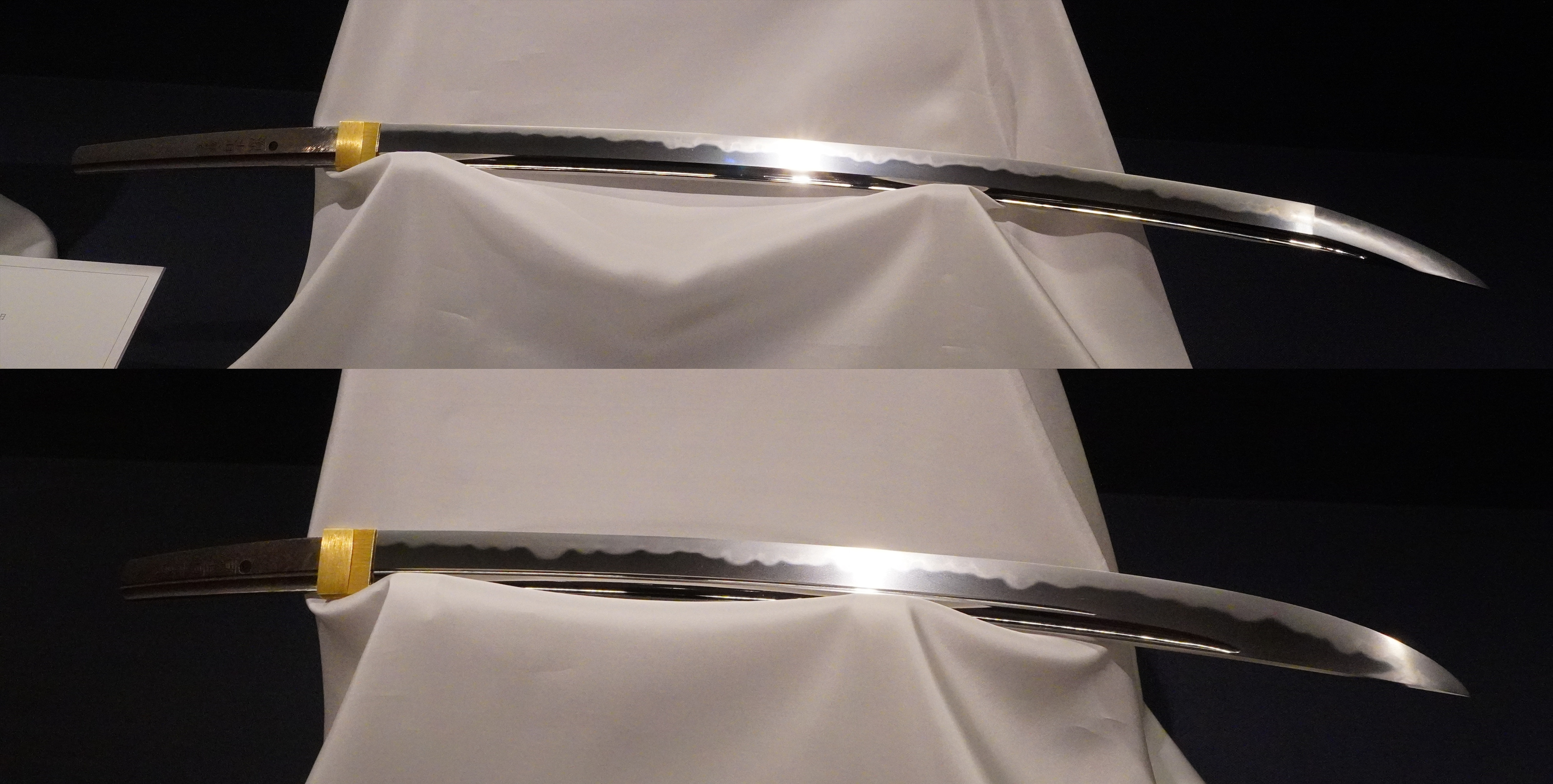
Daishō forged by Minamoto Kiyomaro (ja), Edo period, Designated as Special Important Sword

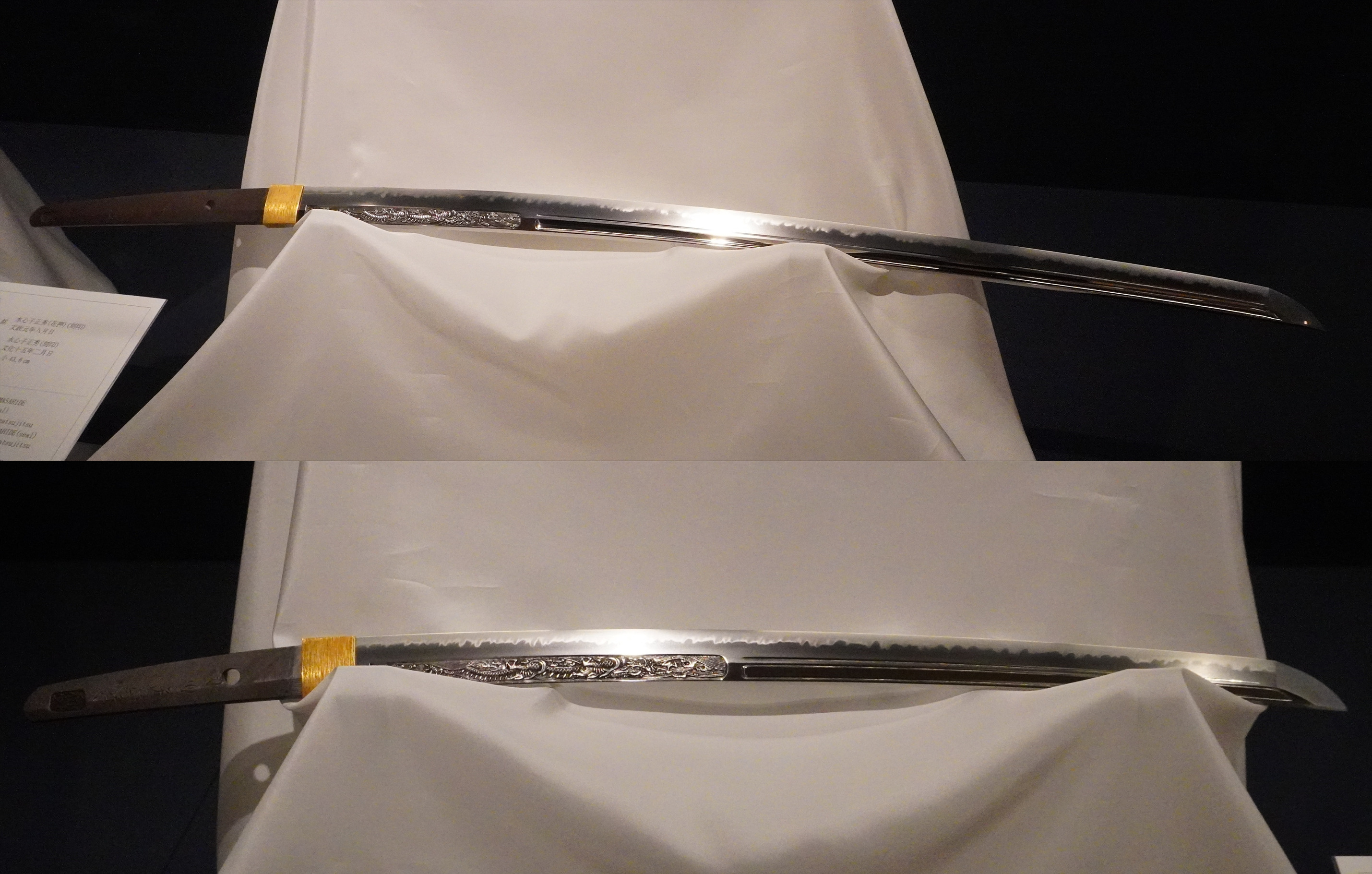
Daishō forged by Suishinshi Masahide (ja), Edo period

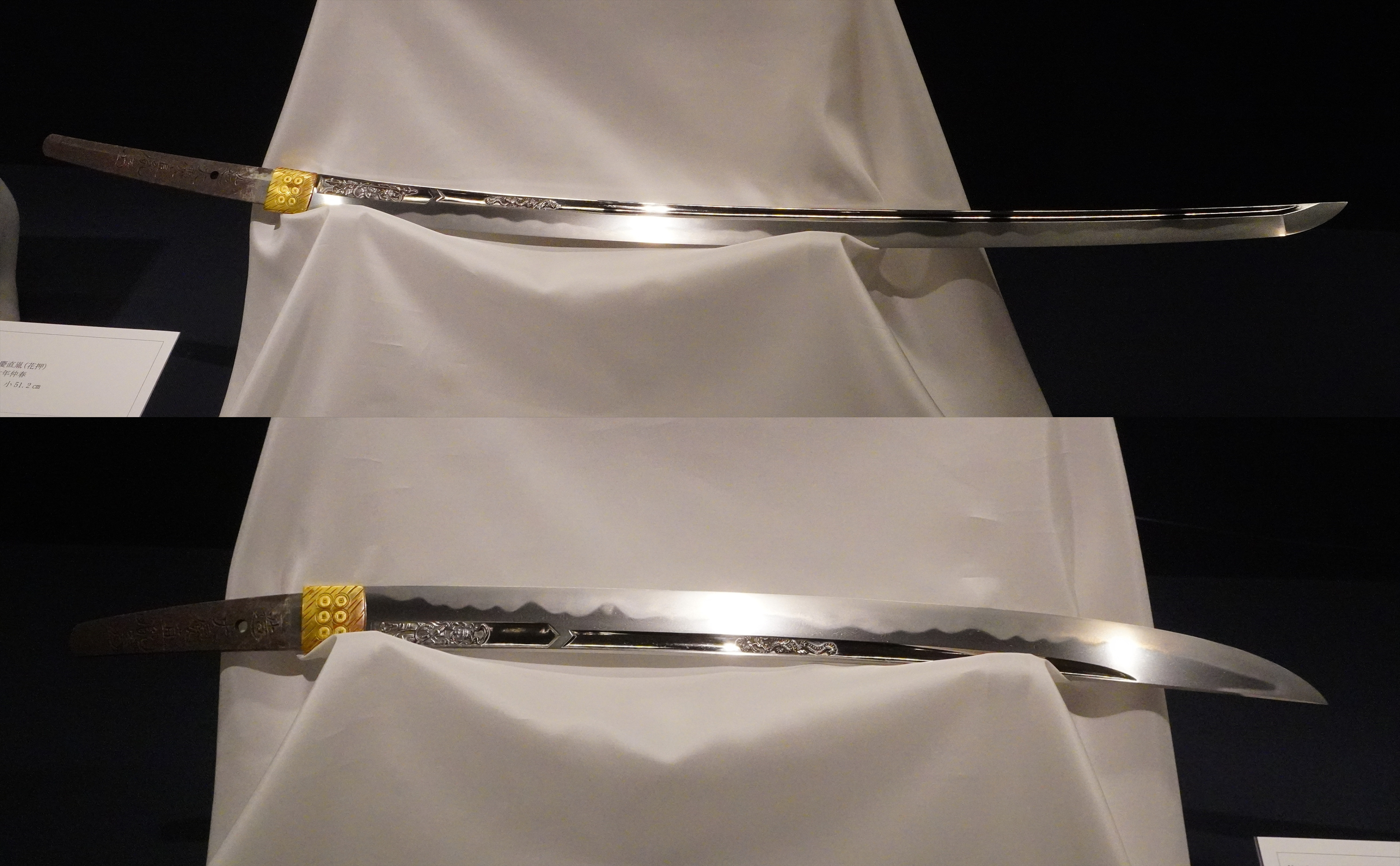
Daishō forged by Taikei Naotane (ja), Edo period, Designated as Important Sword

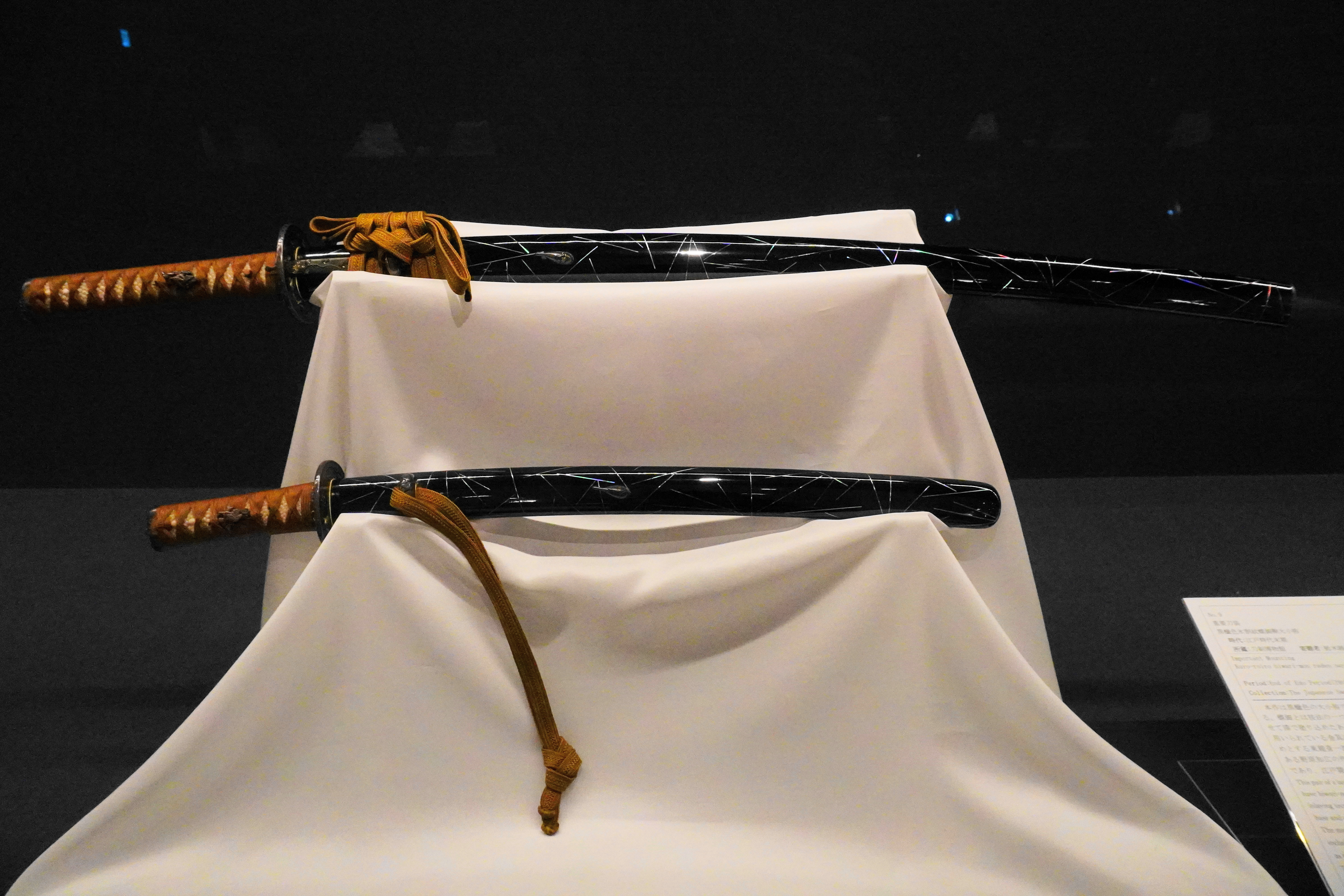
Daishō mountings with ice crack pattern design. Edo period, Designated as Important Mounting, The Japanese Sword Museum

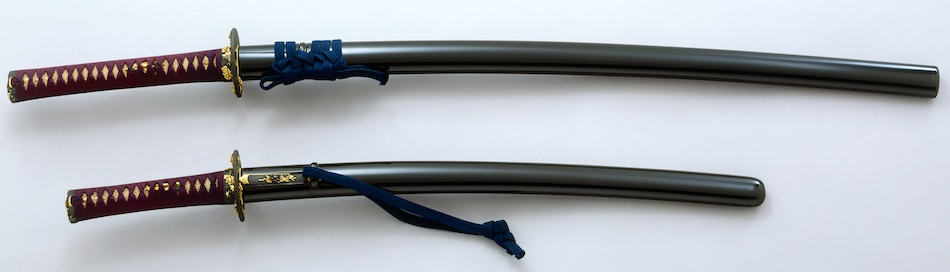
Daishō, black waxed scabbards. 19th century, Edo period. Tokyo Fuji Art Museum.

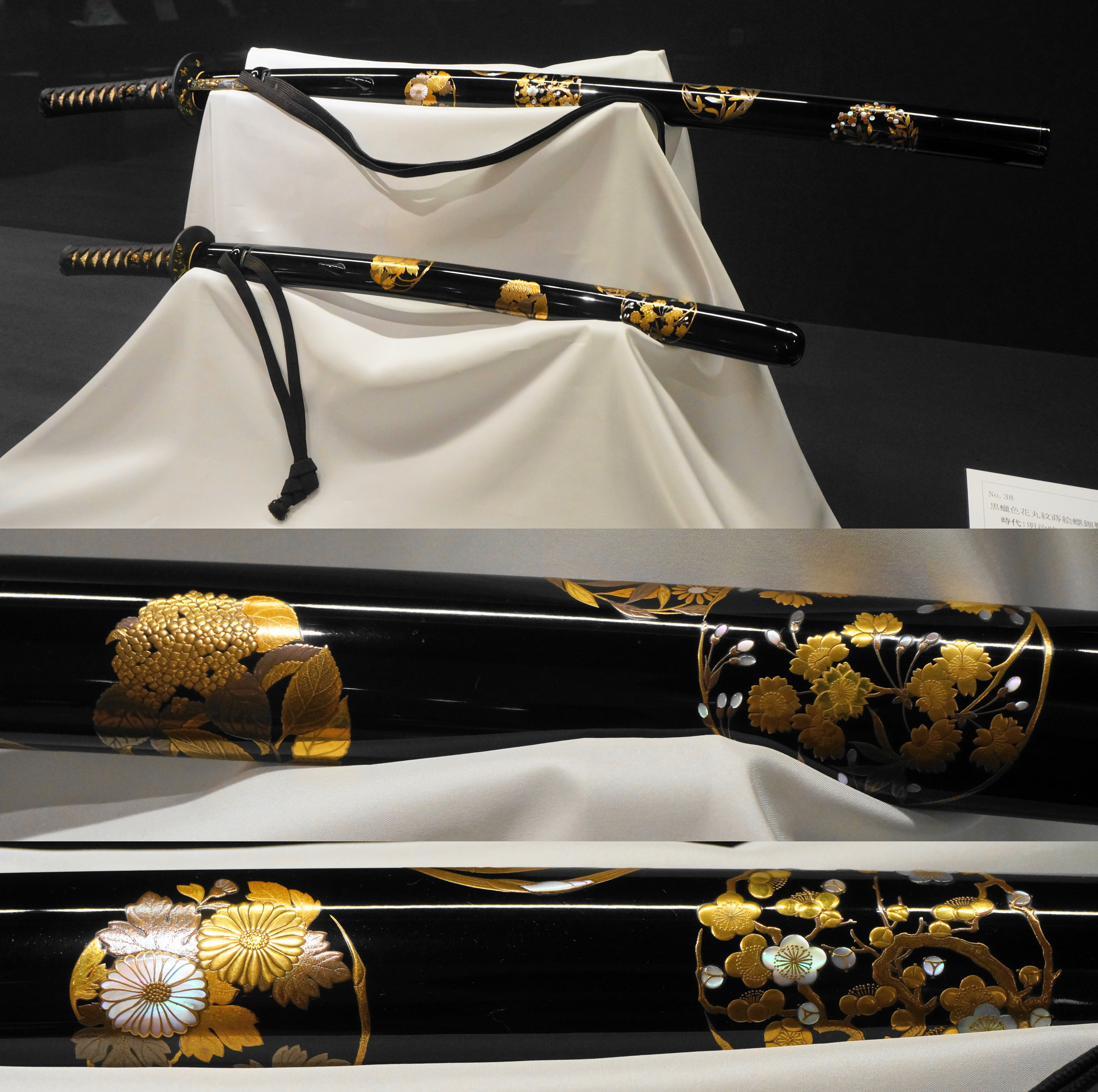
Black lacquered hanamaru mon maki-e raden daishō koshirae (sword mounting). Meiji period.

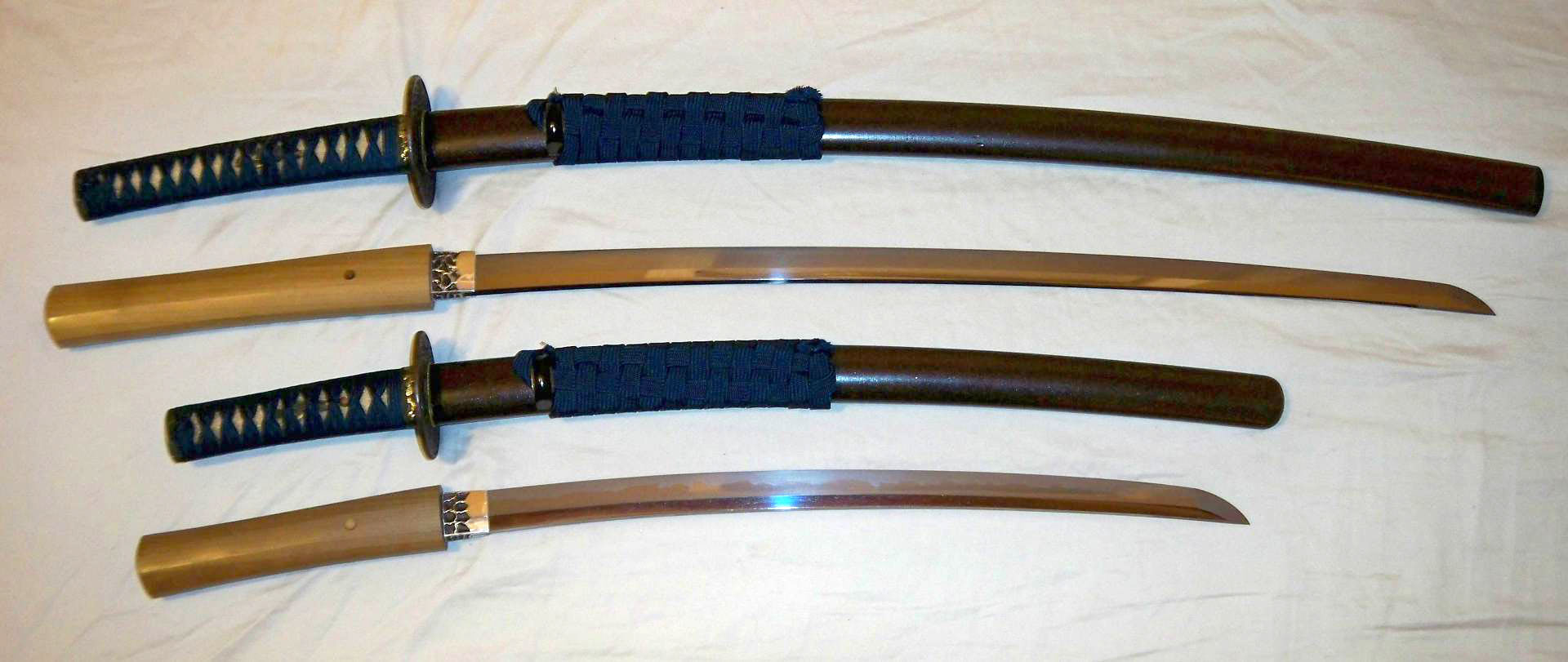
Antique Japanese (samurai) daisho, showing the matched set of mounts (koshirae).

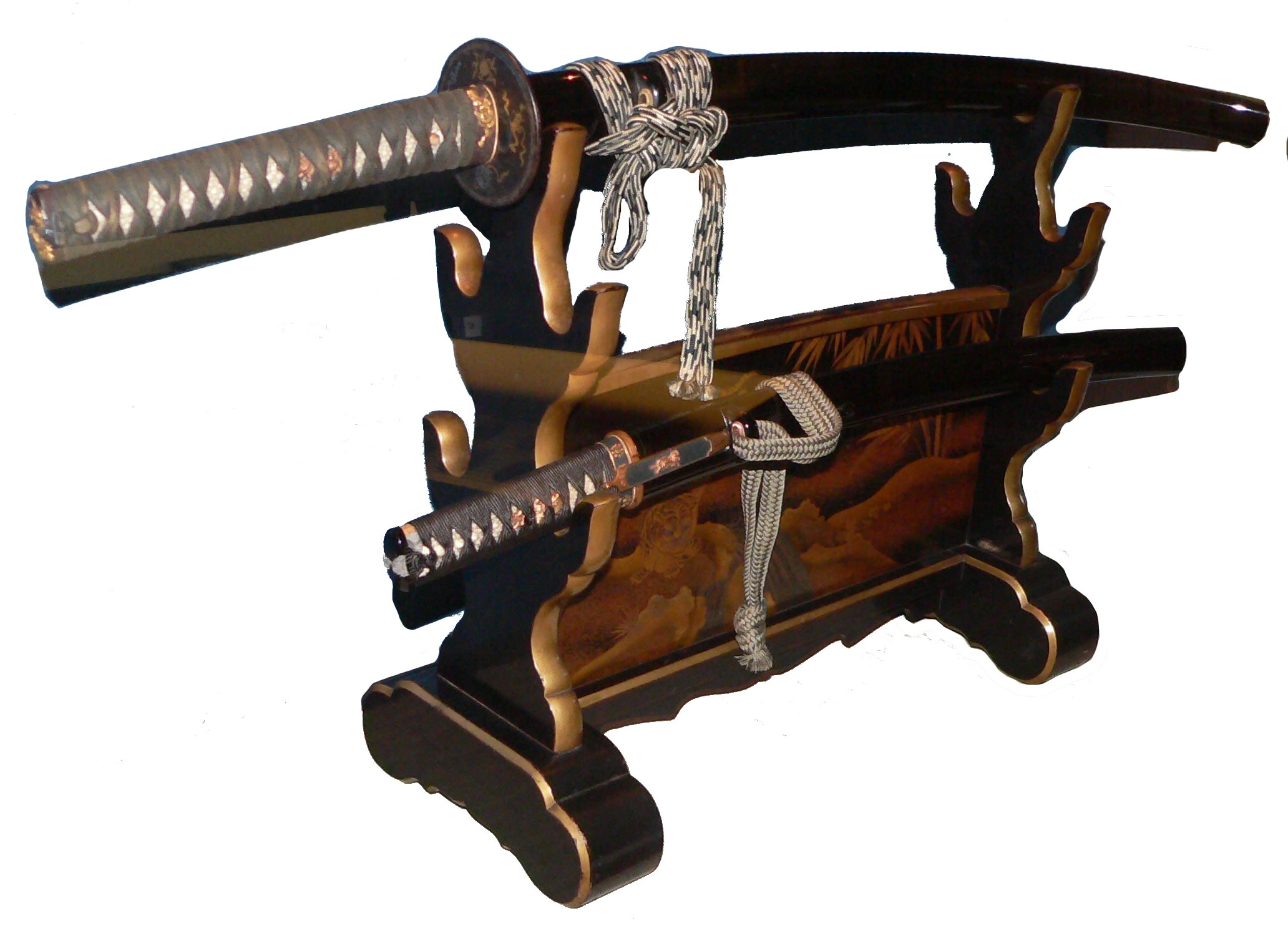
An Edo-period daishō koshirae on its stand. The long-sword is generally stored above the wakizashi, curving downwards. When hung for display, the tip points to the right.

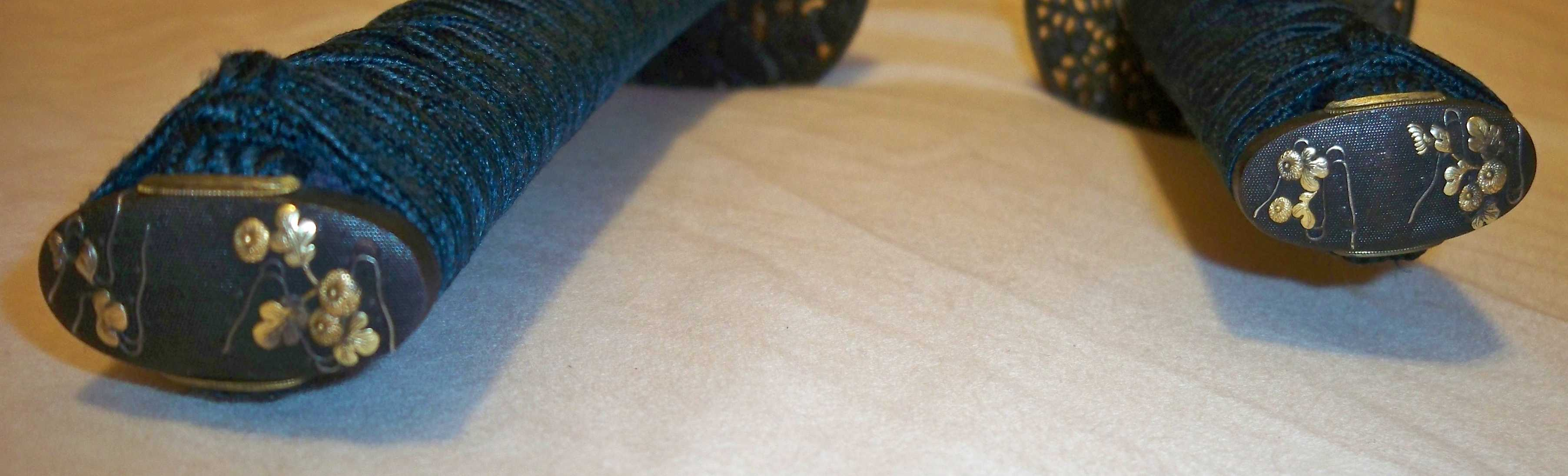
Daisho kashira (pommel)

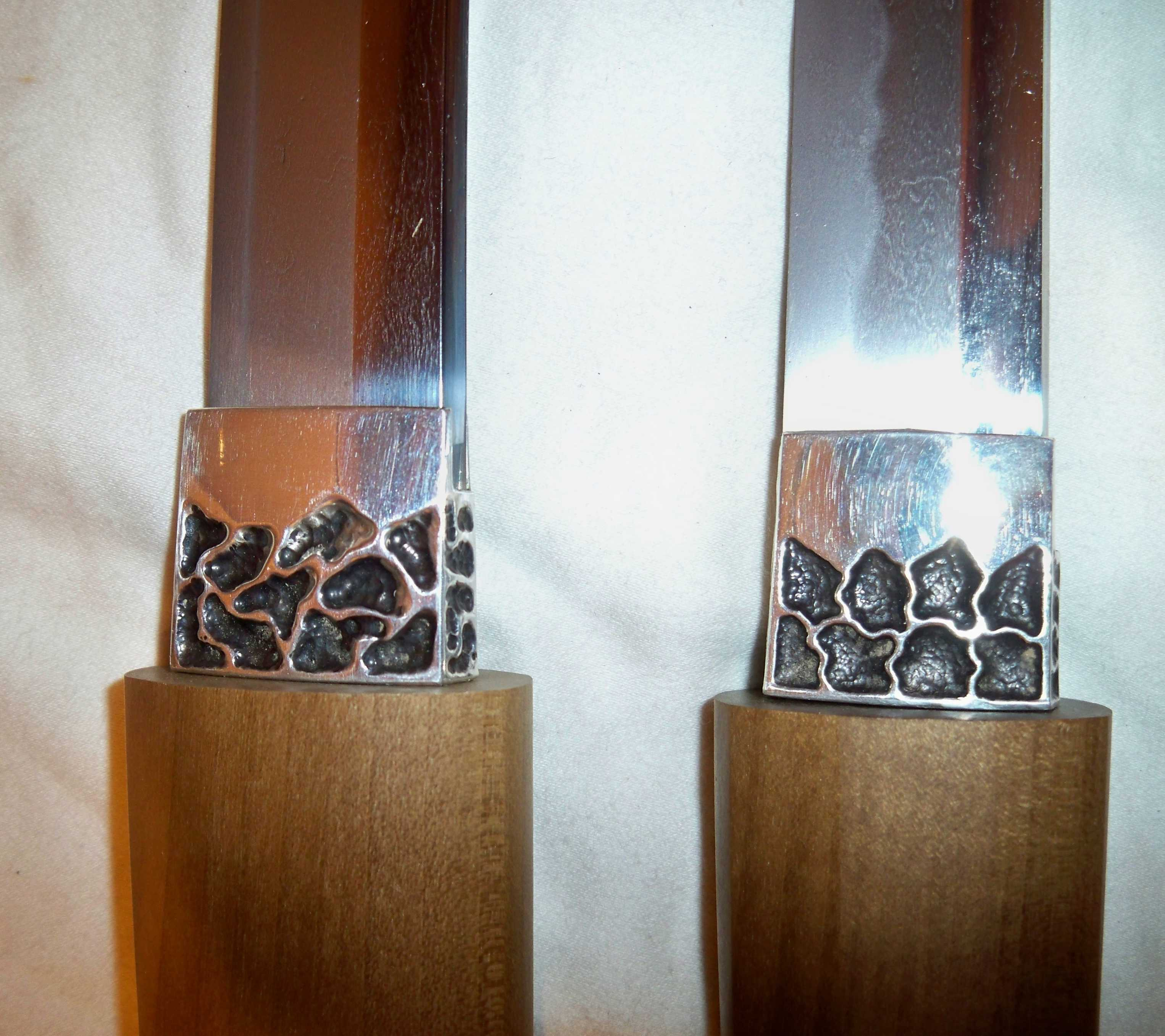
Daisho habaki (wedge-shaped collar)

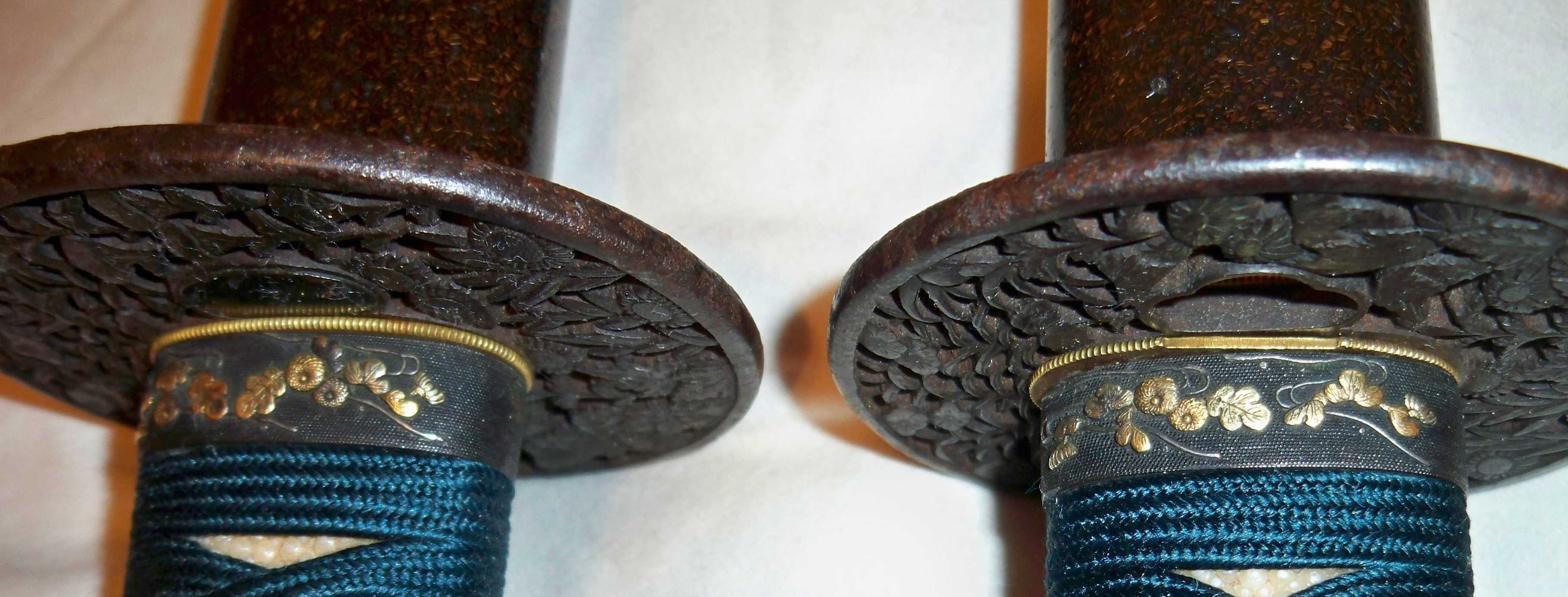
Daisho tsuba and fuchi (hand guard and hilt collar)

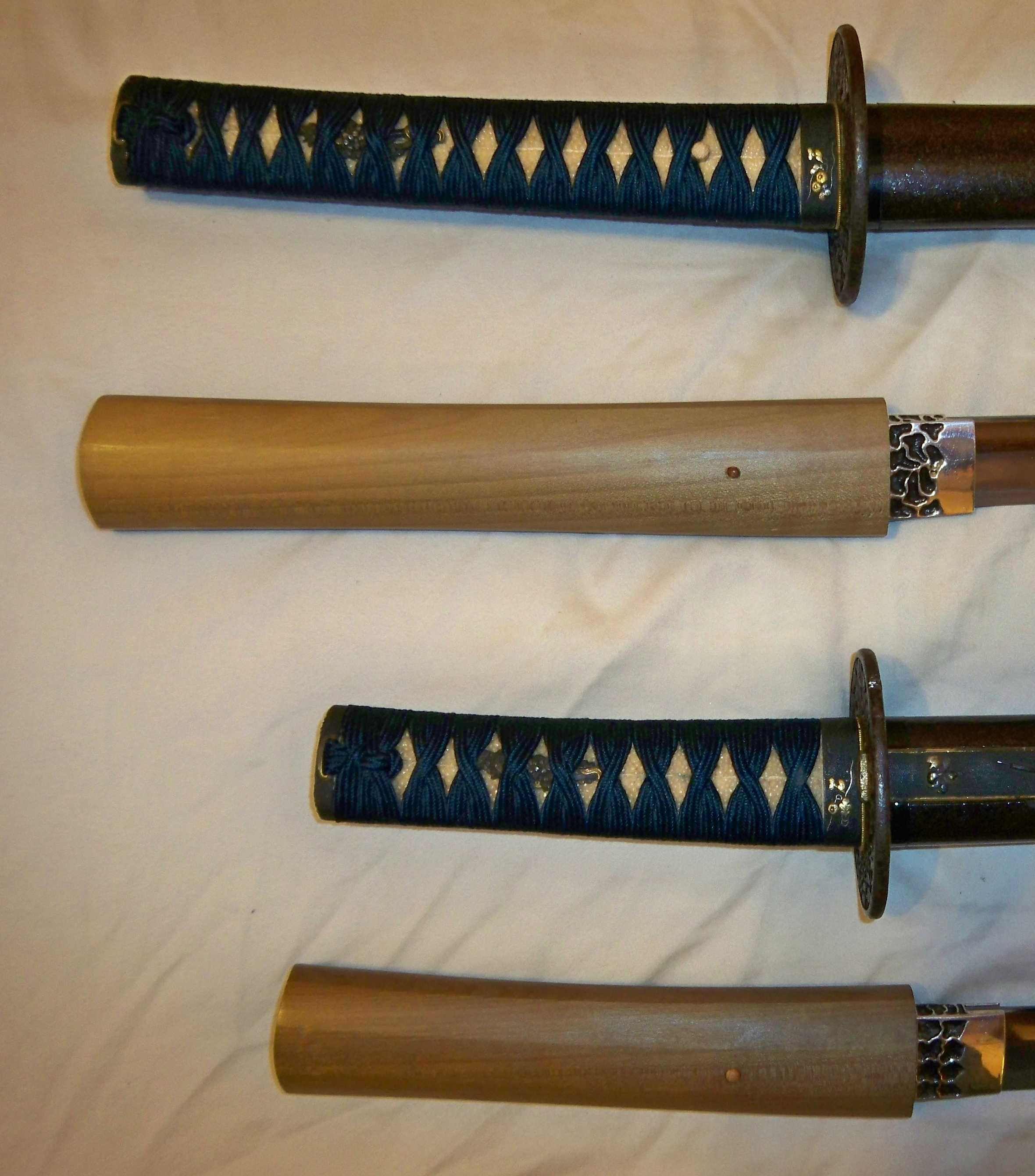
Daisho tsuka (hilt)

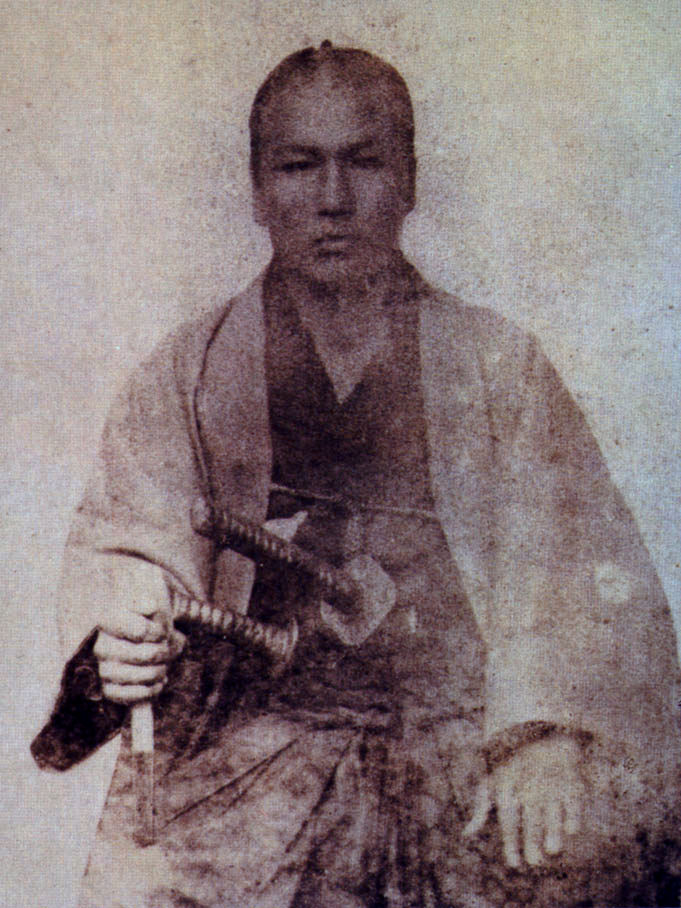
A 19th century samurai wearing his daisho

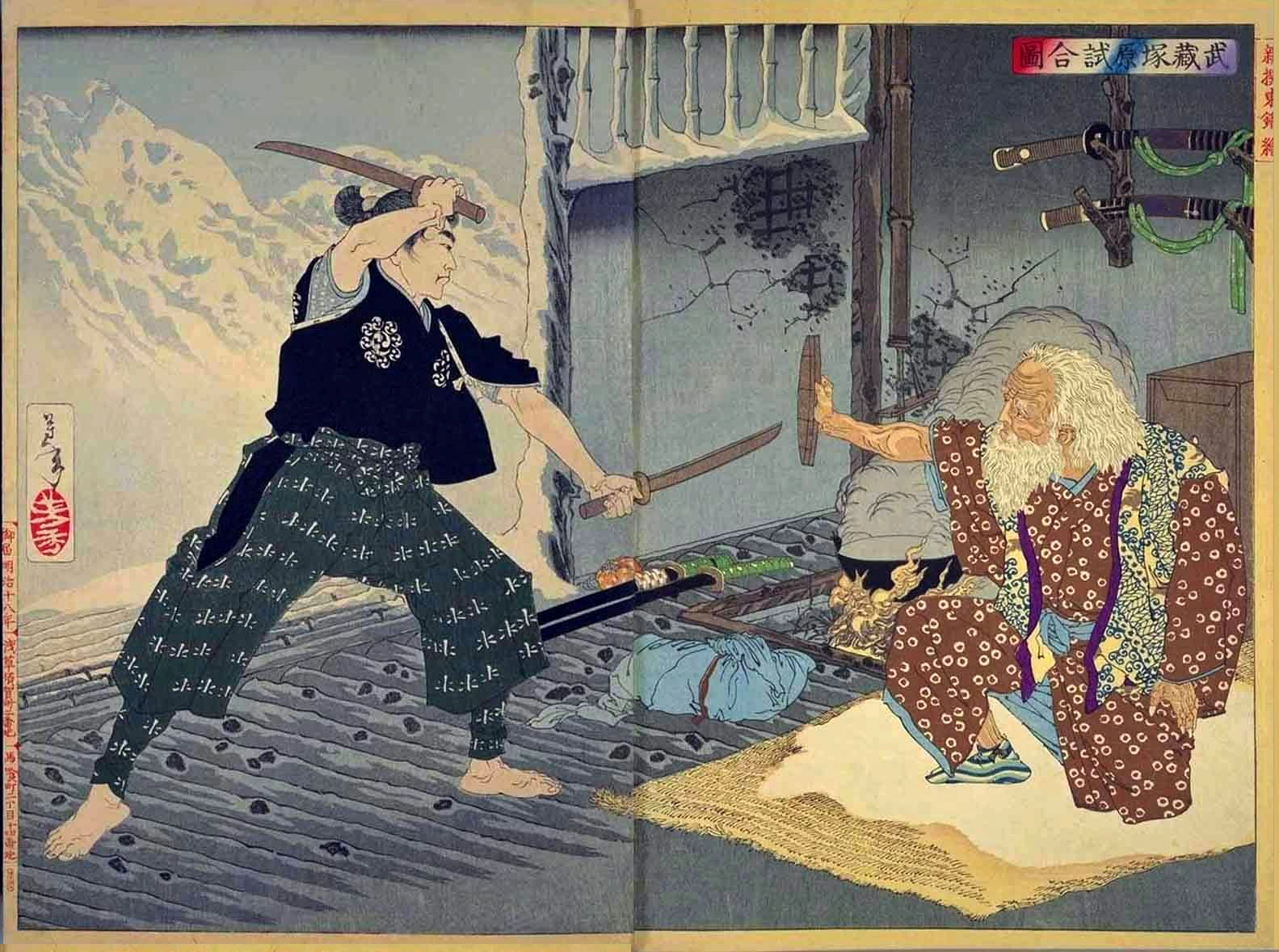
A print depicting the fictional encounter between swordsmen Miyamoto Musashi and Tsukahara Bokuden, the former using both swords in the Niten Ichi-ryū style.

== See also ==
- Japanese sword mountings
- Ōdachi
