= Typhoon Ma-on (2011) =

Pacific typhoon in 2011

Typhoon Ma-on (Ineng)
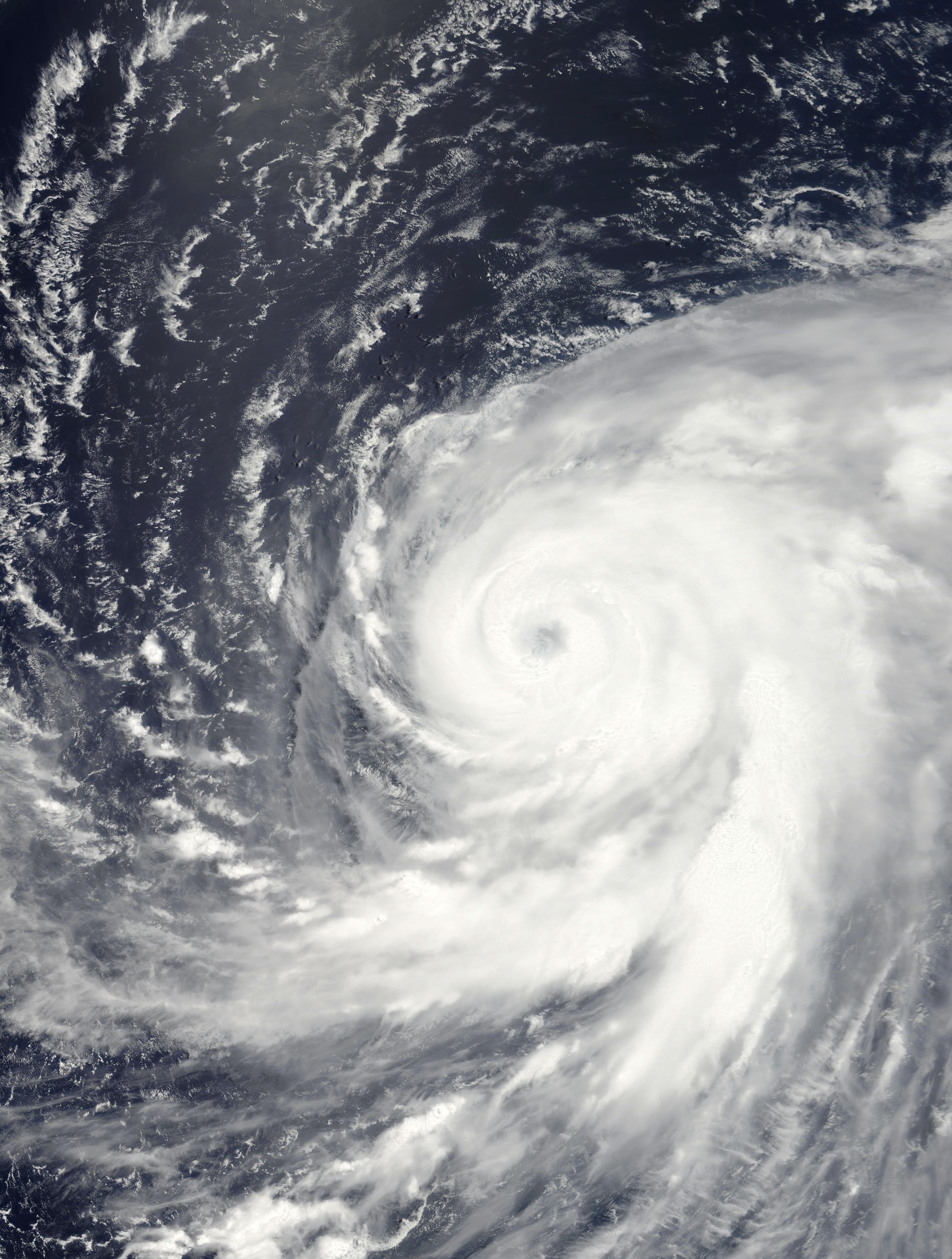
- Typhoon Ma-on near peak intensity on July 16

Meteorological history
- Formed: July 11, 2011
- Extratropical: July 24, 2011
- Dissipated: July 31, 2011

Very strong typhoon
- 10-minute sustained (JMA)
- Highest winds: 175 km/h (110 mph)
- Lowest pressure: 935 hPa (mbar); 27.61 inHg

Category 4-equivalent typhoon
- 1-minute sustained (SSHWS/JTWC)
- Highest winds: 215 km/h (130 mph)
- Lowest pressure: 937 hPa (mbar); 27.67 inHg

Overall effects
- Fatalities: 5 total
- Damage: $50 million (2011 USD)
- Areas affected: Northern Mariana Islands, Japan
- IBTrACS
- Part of the 2011 Pacific typhoon season

Typhoon Ma-on, (Note: The name Ma-on (Cantonese: 馬鞍, [maː˨˧ ɔːn˥]) was contributed by Hong Kong and refers to Ma On Shan in Cantonese.) known in the Philippines as Typhoon Ineng, was a large and powerful typhoon that affected southern Japan in mid-July 2011. It was the sixth named storm and second typhoon of the 2011 Pacific typhoon season. Originating from an area of low pressure near Wake Island on July 9, the precursor to Ma-on gradually developed as it moved westward. By July 11, it had become sufficiently organized to be declared a tropical depression, although the cyclone's circulation remained broad. Over the following days, Ma-on gradually intensified and attained typhoon status on July 14. Favorable environmental conditions allowed for additional strengthening, and the storm ultimately attained peak ten-minute sustained winds of 175 km/h (109 mph) on July 16. After turning northward in response to a weakening subtropical ridge, the typhoon underwent a series of eyewall replacement cycles that caused it to weaken. On July 19, Ma-on struck Shikoku before turning southeastward and moving back over water. Slow weakening continued as Ma-on succumbed to the effects of high wind shear. The system ultimately became extratropical on July 24, and was last noted by the Japan Meteorological Agency a week later near the Kamchatka Peninsula.

Initially, Ma-on posed a slight threat to the Mariana Islands and prompted the issuance of tropical storm warnings. However, the system remained far away from the area and only produced scattered rainfall. In Japan, hundreds of people evacuated from mudslide-prone areas. Torrential rains produced by the storm, estimated at more than 1,200 mm (47 in), led to widespread and damaging floods. Five people perished as a result of Ma-on, and damage reached ¥3.9 billion (2011 JPY, $50 million 2011 USD).

== Meteorological history ==
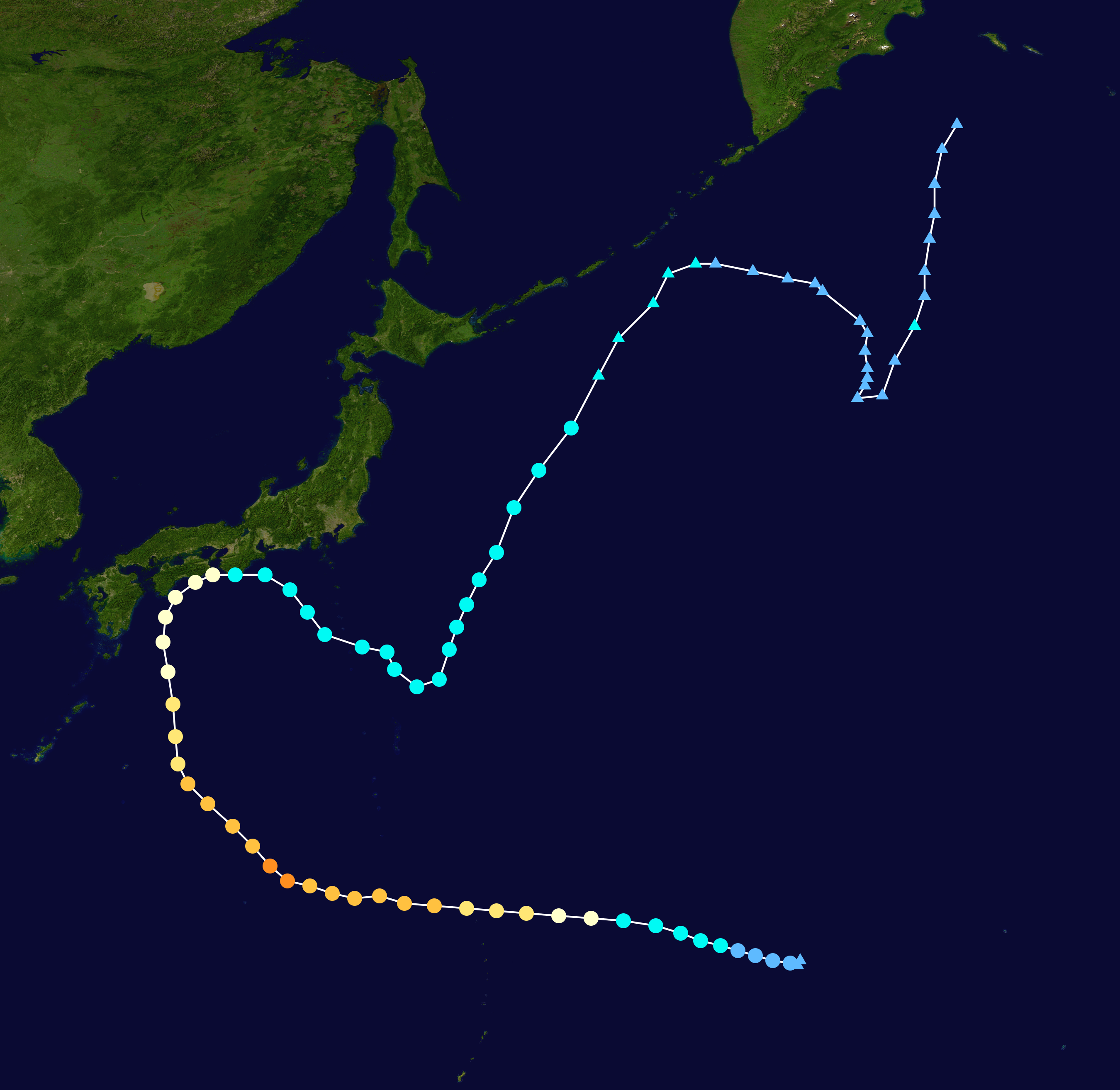
Map plotting the storm's track and intensity, according to the Saffir–Simpson scale Map key Saffir–Simpson scale Tropical depression (≤38 mph, ≤62 km/h) Tropical storm (39–73 mph, 63–118 km/h) Category 1 (74–95 mph, 119–153 km/h) Category 2 (96–110 mph, 154–177 km/h) Category 3 (111–129 mph, 178–208 km/h) Category 4 (130–156 mph, 209–251 km/h) Category 5 (≥157 mph, ≥252 km/h) Unknown Storm type Tropical cyclone Subtropical cyclone Extratropical cyclone, remnant low, tropical disturbance, or monsoon depression

The origins of Ma-on were from an area of convection that meandered near Wake Island on July 9. The disturbance slowly consolidated and developed a low-level circulation. Based on the presence of low wind shear and generally favorable environmental conditions, tropical cyclone forecast models anticipated that the system would develop into a tropical cyclone. Early on July 11, the Joint Typhoon Warning Center (JTWC) issued a tropical cyclone formation alert, and a few hours later the Japan Meteorological Agency (JMA) reported the formation of a tropical depression about halfway between Wake Island and the Northern Marianas Islands. The JTWC followed suit and initiated advisories on Tropical Depression 08W.

The depression tracked westward due to a ridge to its north. Its circulation was initially broad and ill-defined, with patches of disorganized convection due to dry air. The depression was able to intensify due to generally favorable conditions, and the JMA upgraded the depression to a tropical storm named Ma-on at 0600 UTC on July 12. Gradually the thunderstorms became concentrated around the center, despite restricted outflow to the north and west. Ma-on intensified at a slower than climatological rate, although an eye feature became evident by early on July 13. At 0000 UTC that day, the JMA upgraded Ma-on to a severe tropical storm, and 24 hours later the storm intensified into a typhoon to the northeast of the Northern Marianas. By that time, it was also located about 970 km (600 mi) southeast of Iwo Jima. A ragged eye became apparent on satellite imagery, and after developing an anticyclone aloft, its outflow became much better defined.

By July 15, Typhoon Ma-on had a well-defined eye with the strongest convection in its southern periphery. It continued intensifying, and the JTWC estimated 1-minute sustained winds of 220 km/h (140 mph). Late on July 15, Ma-on weakened slightly due to stronger wind shear, which caused its eyewall to break apart in the northwest quadrant. It re-intensified the next day after an eyewall replacement cycle commenced. At 0600 UTC on July 16, the JMA estimated peak 10-minute sustained winds of 175 km/h (109 mph) while the typhoon was located about 1,185 km (736 mi) southeast of Okinawa. Around that time, Ma-on began a motion to the northwest due to a weakening of the subtropical ridge, and it briefly entered the area warned by the Philippine Atmospheric, Geophysical and Astronomical Services Administration (PAGASA); the agency gave it the local name Ineng.

Late on July 17, Ma-on underwent another eyewall replacement cycle and weakened, despite developing improved outflow and convection in the northern quadrant. The typhoon's large size prevented re-intensification – gale force winds extended 370 km (230 mi) east of the center. In addition, the intrusion of dry air diminished thunderstorms in the western periphery. By July 18, Ma-on reached the western extent of the ridge and began a motion to the north toward Japan. The next day, it turned to the northeast as it paralleled the Japan coastline just offshore. At around 1400 UTC on July 19, Ma-on made landfall on Shikoku as a minimal typhoon. Turning to the east, the typhoon weakened to a severe tropical storm before moving over the southern tip of the Kii Peninsula early on July 20. After emerging from the country, Ma-on turned to the southeast. Increased wind shear displaced the convection to the east, although slight re-intensification was expected. However, the JTWC downgraded Ma-on to a tropical depression on July 21 after the storm lost much of its convection. The circulation became ill-defined, and the JTWC discontinued advisories on July 22, noting the system was in the process of dissipation. However, the JMA maintained Ma-on as a severe tropical storm until July 23, by which time the storm had turned to the northeast. The storm became extratropical on July 24 near the Kuril Islands, lasting another seven days before dissipating east of the Kamchatka Peninsula.

== Preparations and impact ==
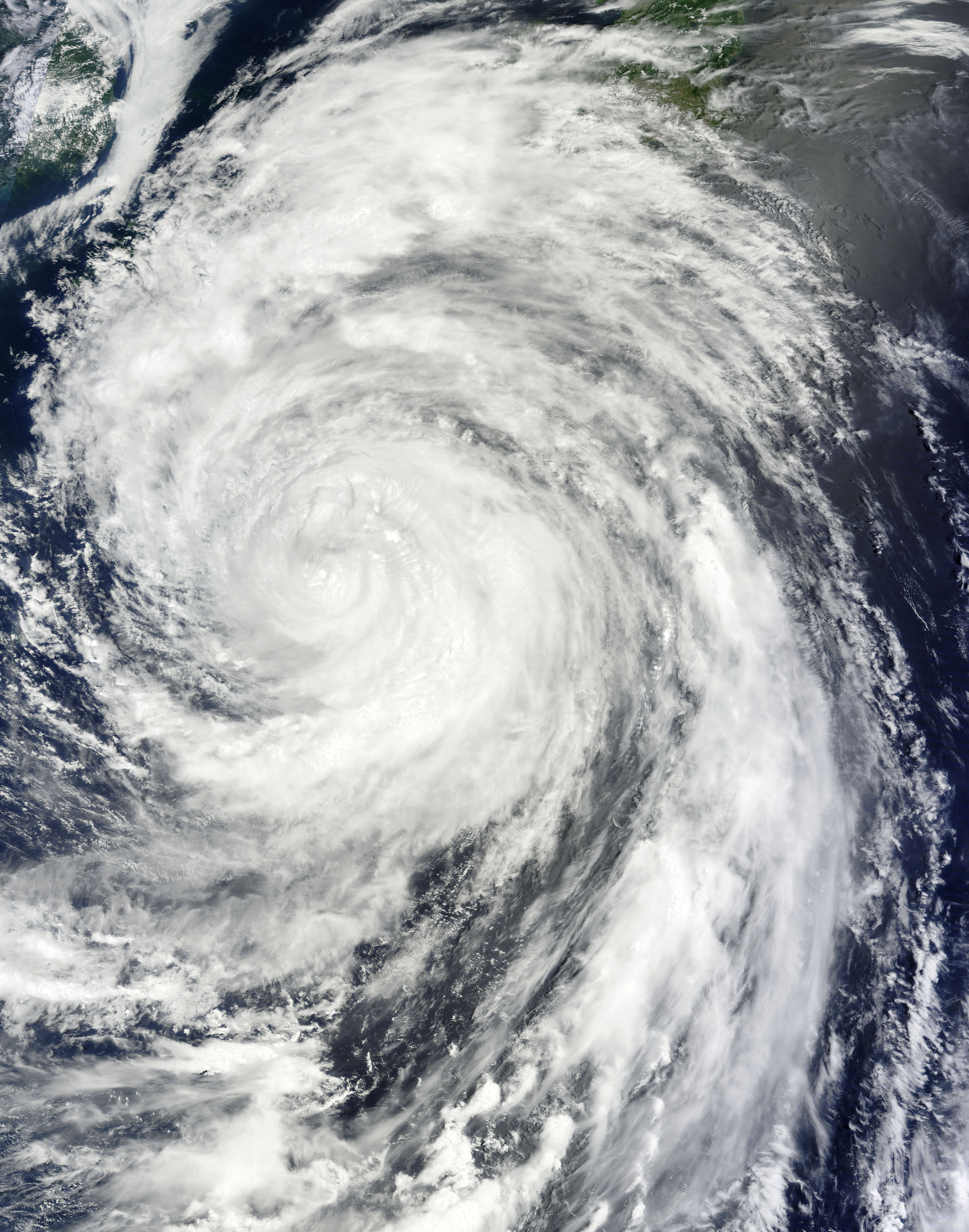
Typhoon Ma-on approaching Japan on July 18

After Ma-on attained tropical storm status, the Tiyan, Guam National Weather Service office issued a tropical storm watch for Agrihan, Pagan, and Alamagan. It was later upgraded to a tropical storm warning after Ma-on became a typhoon, which was canceled after the storm passed the islands to the north. The typhoon produced high waves in Guam, as well as gusty winds and precipitation in an outer feeder band.

High waves in advance of the typhoon capsized a boat in the East China Sea, although the six passengers were rescued. Moisture from the storm extended west to Taiwan, where over 600 mm (24 in) of rainfall was reported. The heavy rainfall caused flooding and mudslides that blocked roadways and forced evacuations.

In Japan, the typhoon was forecast to strike areas affected by the Fukushima Daiichi nuclear disaster. Officials prepared by installing a cover to prevent rain contamination. Ultimately, there still was rain contamination, and Ma-on's passage produced 2,000 tons of radioactive water. Before the storm struck Japan, officials in Miyakonojō, Miyazaki advised the evacuation of about 900 people in areas prone to mudslides. At least 300 airline flights were canceled due to the storm. The typhoon also caused delays in the nation's rail system. Nippon Oil stopped shipping oil during the storm. As Ma-on moved across Japan, it produced winds of 108 km/h (67 mph), along with heavy rainfall of up to 1,200 mm (47 in). Rainfall in a 24‑hour period reached 860 mm (34 in) in Umaji, Kōchi, which set a 24‑hour rainfall record and exceeded the average July precipitation by 265.5 mm (10.45 in). The rains flooded houses and roads in the region. High rains closed several expressways, and in Shizuoka Prefecture, a blocked road stranded 96 mountain climbers. Strong winds left about 11,000 people without power on Shikoku Island. The combination of winds and rain damaged the 385‑year‑old Nijō Castle in Kyoto. The typhoon injured 60 people, and killed five people. One of the deaths was from a man who drowned while checking on his boat during the storm. Damage was estimated at ¥3.9 billion (2011 JPY, $50 million 2011 USD).

Following Ma-on's passage, temperatures decreased across Japan, which led to a marked decrease in heat stroke deaths. Throughout the month, heat stroke deaths were 70% less than in July 2010.

== See also ==
- Other tropical cyclones named Ma-on
- Other tropical cyclones named Ineng
