= Teenage Mutant Ninja Turtles (NES video game) =

1989 video game

- The box art was taken from an alternative cover of Teenage Mutant Ninja Turtles #4.
- Developer: Konami
- Publishers: JP: Konami; NA: Ultra Games; EU: Palcom (NES); EU: Image Works (ZX Spectrum)
- Series: Teenage Mutant Ninja Turtles
- Platforms: Nintendo Entertainment System, Amiga, Amstrad CPC, Atari ST, Commodore 64, MS-DOS, MSX, ZX Spectrum, PlayChoice-10
- Release: Famicom: JP: May 12, 1989; NES: NA: June 1989; ZX Spectrum: UK: November 1990
- Genres: Action, platform
- Mode: Single-player

Teenage Mutant Ninja Turtles (Note: Japanese: 激亀忍者伝, Hepburn: Geki Kame Ninja Den lit. "Legend of the Radical Ninja Turtles" Released as Teenage Mutant Hero Turtles in Europe.) is a 1989 action-platform game developed and published by Konami for the Nintendo Entertainment System. In North America it was published under Konami's Ultra Games imprint in the US and the equivalent PALCOM brand in Europe and Australia.

Alongside the arcade game (also developed by Konami), it was one of the first video games based on the 1987 Teenage Mutant Ninja Turtles animated series, being released after the show's second season. The game sold more than 4 million cartridges worldwide.

== Plot ==
Shredder kidnaps April and gains the Life Transformer Gun, a weapon capable of returning Splinter to his human form. In order to save April, the turtles (Leo, Mikey, Donnie and Raph) embark on the streets of New York to confront the Foot Clan. While traversing the sewers, the turtles encounter Bebop, a mutated pig, and Rocksteady, a mutant rhino. Though the turtles defeat Bebop, Rocksteady escapes with April O'Neil. The turtles then chase Rocksteady to an abandoned warehouse, fight him, and rescue April. After disabling bombs in the Hudson River dam, Shredder captures Splinter, leading to the turtles giving chase in the Party Wagon. Hot in pursuit, the turtles search the city and eventually find that Splinter is being held captive by the robotic Mecaturtle on a skyscraper rooftop. After the turtles save Splinter, Shredder escapes in a helicopter. The turtles give chase, tracking him to JFK airport, where they encounter Big Mouser. After defeating Big Mouser, the turtles head to Shredder's secret Foot Clan base in the South Bronx via the Turtle Blimp. Once there, they locate and battle the Technodrome underground. The turtles descend into the Technodrome's reactor and ultimately defeat Shredder. With the Life Transformer Gun, the turtles help Splinter return to his human form. After the accomplishment of a tough mission, the turtles and April celebrate with a pizza.

== Gameplay ==
Leonardo surrounded by Mousers

Teenage Mutant Ninja Turtles is a single-player action game. The player starts as Leonardo, but can switch to any of the other turtles from the information screen. The information screen shows each turtle's health, special weapons, a map grid of the current area, and messages from either Splinter or April. Each primary weapon has a different speed, power, and reach. Thus, during gameplay, certain turtles may be more adept at defeating different enemies and navigating particular obstacles than others. When a turtle runs out of health, falls into a fatal trap, or is struck by a roller car, the Foot Clan captures the turtle and holds him in an undisclosed location. This forces the player to pick one of the remaining turtles to continue. The player loses when all four turtles are captured. From stage three onward, a captured turtle may be rescued once per each area of gameplay. Overall, six stages (missions) comprise the game: 1) Streets of New York 2) Hudson River Dam 3) Wall Street Rooftops 4) JFK Airport 5) South Bronx Lair 6) Technodrome.

The player initially navigates the mission map in an overhead view. When a turtle enters a sewer or building interior, gameplay switches to a side-scrolling perspective. While in the overhead view, the player can move in four cardinal directions and use primary weapons for a single type of attack. As the game progresses, a higher amount of more lethal enemies appear. In later stages, obstacles include gaps that involve well-timed jumps and inaccessible areas which require specialty items, such as ropes, to progress across building rooftops.

In side-scrolling portions, the turtles jump, crouch, and attack with primary or alternate weapons. Alternate weapons are occasionally dropped by enemies or found in limited quantities. These weapons include single shurikens (throwing stars), triple shurikens (launches three stars simultaneously in a spreading pattern) and boomerangs. A powerful "Kiai" weapon, a scroll that expands into a crescent-shaped beam, may be found in later stages. A limited number of invincibility icons also appear throughout the game, which grant a temporary "cannonball" effect and allows a turtle to bulldoze their way through enemies and obstacles. On a side note, boomerangs can be reused if the player catches them upon return. Lastly, if a turtle acquires a new weapon, it will replace the previous alternate weapon.

As the game progresses, the turtles must defeat various enemies, navigate traps, search for specific items, and complete certain tasks, such as defusing timed bombs in the underwater area of stage two. During gameplay, the turtles collect pizza to replenish health. The amount of health restored is dependent on pizza portions (whole, half, or slice). The player is given a limited number of continues. Boss confrontations include Bebop (stage one mid-boss), Rocksteady (stage one boss), Mecaturtle (stage three), Big Mouser (stage four), the Technodrome (stage five), and Shredder.

== Development ==
=== Background ===
Peter Laird and Kevin Eastman created the Teenage Mutant Ninja Turtles (TMNT) comics in the 1980s. Mark Freedman was the head of Surge Licensing, and had signed on to represent the TMNT brand and secured the rights with Playmates Toys for a toy line and for the first animated television series.

Konami had released its first licensed video game with Cabbage Patch Kids: Adventures in the Park (1984) based on the Cabbage Patch Kids toy line and became the first third-party company to develop games for Nintendo's Family Computer (Famicom) home console in 1986. Emil Heidkamp joined Konami in 1986. He decided to encourage Konami to license other media. Finding that flight simulator-styled video games were popular in America, he pitched the idea of a flight sim to Kenji Hiraoka, who was the liaison between Konami's Chicago and Japan-based offices, and was uninterested in the idea. Upon pitching the idea to Konami founder Kagemasa Kōzuki, Heidkamp suggested they could make a flight sim video game based on the film Top Gun (1986), which excited Kōzuki. This led to Konami making a Top Gun video game and becoming more open to seeking licensed properties for games.

Nintendo of America had limited all companies publishing games to release only five games per year. This led to meetings between Konami and then CEO of Nintendo Yamauchi Hiroshi which did not result in any deal being struck to release more than five games. To release more games, Konami founded Ultra Games in 1988. The company was presented as a publisher, and was publicly known as a spinoff of Konami's American operations branch. The creation of Ultra Games within Konami allowed them to release twice as many games for Nintendo's Nintendo Entertainment System console in a year and doubled Heidkemp's workload.

=== Production ===
Freedman had reached out to Konami, describing that the "timing was wonderful for [Surge and Konami]", as Konami was searching for action and adventure themed content to adapt into video games. At the time of these deals, the toys and series had not been released, with Andrew Farago author of Teenage Mutant Ninja Turtles: The Ultimate Visual History describing the brand as an "unknown quantity to the general public." Heidkamp found the submission for Teenage Mutant Ninja Turtles in his inbox. He invited Freedman out to Chicago where they struck a deal, with Freedman stating he received a cheque that was "more money than I'd ever seen in my life." Konami had been wanting to develop a new martial arts themed game. Desiring to match the financial success of their licensed games like Top Gun and Double Dribble (1986), Heidkamp proposed the TMNT property for a martial arts styled game.

The animated series arrived to television in late 1987, with its popularity leading to Nick Thorpe of Retro Gamer as overtaking the comics in popular consciousness. In 1991, Playthings described the TMNT as being one of the most successful cross-licensing campaigns by 1991, while Video Games & Computer Entertainment reported that by December 1990, 130 licensees developed products using the imagery from the series. This included films, animated television series, comic books, stage shows, toys, and houseware products.

When Konami was set to the task of making the game, their design documents and resources from Mirage and Surge licensing were based on the original comic and a brief overview of the television show. Influences of the animated series were included, such as borrowing characters Bebop and Rocksteady and featuring the Ninja Turtles with different colored bandanas. Nobuya Nakazato, who worked on the development team for the game, said that members of the team performed many jobs. He explained that it was normal for the development team to check the game they had worked on themselves. This led to him working on the game while also working on debugging other Konami titles such as The Adventures of Bayou Billy (1988), Gradius II (1988), and Blades of Steel (1987). Former Konami composer and audio programmer Hidenori Maezawa said that the company could not use music from the television series due to copyright issues.

== Release ==
Teenage Mutant Ninja Turtles was presented at the Nintendo Booth at the Winter Consumers Electronics Show (CES) in 1989. The Japanese release was the first piece of TMNT related media to be released in the country. The Japanese release of the game is generally the same as the later Nintendo Entertainment System (NES) release, with small changes such as the character April O'Neil being presented as Splinter's daughter in both the manual and in-game text. The game was released on May 12, 1989 in Japan for the Famicom under the title Geki Kame Ninja Den (激亀忍者伝; which loosely translates to "Legend of the Radical Ninja Turtles"). It was released in North American markets in June 1989 for the Nintendo Entertainment System (NES). The NES version of the game was released to arcades as part of Nintendo's PlayChoice-10 line of arcades. It was made available by 1990.

In the United Kingdom, the NES game was released by Palcom, another of Konami's subsidiaries. Former Sega CEO Mike Hayes described the NES reception in the United Kingdom as a "failing brand, treated as a toy by Mattel" and that it was not achieving the high sales it had in North America and Japan. As the distributor for the system in the United Kingdom, the company Hayes had worked for included the console with the game, which was re-titled Teenage Mutant Hero Turtles in a bundle called the Mutant Machine. Both the title of the game and the show were changed in the UK, as the word "ninja" was considered to be too explicitly violent for a children's program in Europe. The release of the bundle led to far higher sales during the Christmas season of 1990, leading to the NES to overtake Sega's Master System console sales.

By May 1990, it had sold over 1 million cartridges in the United States. By the end of 1990, the game had sold more than 4 million cartridges worldwide, earning $125 million ($325 million adjusted for inflation) for Konami. Konami reported it as the best-selling third-party NES game in 1991. Combined sales of all the Teenage Mutant Ninja Turtles games from Konami were estimated at $250 million by June 1991.

=== Ports ===
Conversions of Teenage Mutant Ninja Turtles were later developed for a variety of home computer platforms. Computer Gaming World said that this release was part of Konami's then recent emphasis on porting their popular NES for home computers. The games were set for release in the first half of 1990. At the 1990 Summer CES, the ports for the C64, IBM PC-compatible and Amiga were presented. The ports to home computer versions have a myriad of differences between them. Examples include the UK versions being released with different graphics than their US counterparts. The computer versions released in the UK also contained differences between them. One difference was that the Amiga, Atari ST and C64 versions featured the ability to save the game, while the Amstrad and ZX Spectrum versions did not.

In 1990, Konami and the UK company Mirrorsoft made deals to release certain titles in their respective markets. Image Works approached Probe towards the end of 1990 to develop the ports for the game. Dave Perry and Nick Bruty worked as freelancers for Probe Software and developed the ZX Spectrum version. It was released in early November 1990 by Image Works. A representative for Image Works said that they expected sales to be high for the port of the game and gave it a higher budget for the UK home computer market. All the other versions for the UK release were published by the Christmas season of that year.

The ZX Spectrum version sold 420,000 copies within its first month of its release, an amount that Retro Gamer described as "staggering" as sales for the computer system were in decline at the time. It was the highest selling game from Image Works. The game was the UK's number 1 selling Spectrum game for 6 months between March and August 1991.

The NES version was released in 2007 on the Wii's Virtual Console. It was released for the Wii in Europe and Australia for 500 points, which was later raised to 600 points. In North America, it was released for Wii on April 2, 2007, for the price of 600 points, 100 points more than the average NES title on the Virtual Console. This was due to Konami having to re-organize the rights to re-release the game leading to its more expensive price. It was the first licensed game to appear on the North American and European Virtual Console. Due to licensing issues, it was later removed from the Wii Shop Channel in Japan on January 24, 2012, and in North America and Europe on January 26, 2012.

The NES version was re-released as part of Teenage Mutant Ninja Turtles: The Cowabunga Collection in 2022.

== Reception ==
Console reception

Review scores
Publication	Score
Computer and Video Games	89%
Electronic Gaming Monthly	6/10, 7/10, 6/10, 4/10
Famicom Hisshoubon	2.5/5
Famicom Tsūshin	5/10, 7/10, 7/10, 5/10
Game Zone	5/5
The Games Machine	86%
Mean Machines	90%
Power Play	57%
Rave	87%
Zero	93/100

Cameron Koch of Tech Times described the Teenage Mutant Ninja Turtles game as being "well-received" at the time of its release.

Both Game Zone Zero magazine described the game as "superbly designed" noting the large amount of surprises it had. Julian Rignall of Mean Machines said it was a very original game while Computer Entertainer and Matt Regan of Mean Machines described the variety as a highlight, specifically noting the level design and the different abilities of the four playable characters respectively.

Some reviewers commented on the games difficulty, with reviewers in both Rave and Famicom Hisshoubon magazines describing it as "just right" and "reasonable" respectively, while The Games Machine wrote that it was "tough, but very playable game" A review in Computer and Video Games summarized that "the high level of difficulty isn't all that frustrating" and only adds to the product while one reviewer in Famicom Tsūshin found the game too difficult to be enjoyable.

Other reviewers in Famicom Tsūshin described the game as too similar to other earlier Konami games such as Castlevania (1986) and The Goonies (1986) with one reviewer finding the gameplay to be too ordinary and only recommending it to fans of the genre. The Japanese magazine Famicom Hisshoubon disliked the characters and gameplay saying they were all made with American audiences in mind. Three of the four reviewers in Electronic Gaming Monthly gave the game mediocre reviews with one stating it was "nothing revolutionary" while another concluded it was "not a true Konami game". Martin Gaksch of Power Play echoed this, writing that the game did not reach the heights of previous Konami games such as Salamander (1986).

Several publications, such as Computer Entertainer, Famicom Tsūshin, Game Zone, Mean Machines and Zero complimented the graphics. The reviewer in Rave wrote that the "graphics are impressive for the NES, with superb use of vivid colors and impressive animation." Both Computer Entertainer and one reviewer in Famicom Tsūshin specifically complimented the animation of the turtles doing backflips as they jumped. Computer and Video Games complimented what they described as "colorful graphics" as well as commenting that they were "a bit on the blocky side at times". Gaksch also noted that the graphics had an annoying habit of flickering throughout the game.

=== Ports ===
PC ports reception

Review scores
Publication	Score			
Publication	Amiga	Atari ST	C64	ZX
Crash	N/A	N/A	N/A	80%
Computer and Video Games	82%	N/A	N/A	85%
Sinclair User	N/A	N/A	N/A	94%
ST Action	N/A	78%	N/A	N/A
Your Sinclair	N/A	N/A	N/A	90/100
Zzap!64	38%	N/A	59%	N/A
Your Commodore	N/A	N/A	68%	N/A
Power Play	38%	36%	36%	N/A

For the ZX Spectrum port, Your Sinclair complimented the release, praising the colorful, cartoonish graphics and movesets while also criticizing the swimming level. A reviewer in Computer and Video Games complimented both the Amstrad CPC and Spectrum ports, declaring them "not the most ambitious of game concepts, but it's surprisingly good fun to play."

For the Amiga and C64 releases, two reviewers in Zzap!64 found the gameplay in both versions repetitive with poor quality graphics concluding that it was "a dull game which would've sunk without trace if it didn't have the Turtles name." A review from Duncan Evans in Your Commodore found that the character sprites looked alright on the C64, but the sound was awful and the gameplay mediocre. Evans suggested the game Last Ninja 3 for a superior similar title.

Gaksch dismissed the Amiga version with jerky scrolling, sprites and mediocre graphics and sound. He found the game poorly developed as it required players to swap the disk to load it several times during gameplay. He said while the original NES game was not brilliant, it showcased that there was a decent game originally. Volker Weitz of Power Play reviewed the Atari ST, Amiga and C64 versions and wrote that Imageworks releases had dull level design poor collision detection and unsightly graphics. He summarized that the Image Works' ports were only released to quickly cash in on the popularity of the franchise.

In 2018, an anonymous reviewer in Retro Gamer complimented the ZX Spectrum port as a large technical accomplishment for the system. The review highlighted its large sprites and scrolling non-lagging animation and only lamenting that it lacked a soundtrack.

=== Retrospective ===
Retrospective reception

Review scores
Publication	Score	
Publication	NES	Wii
Allgame	3/5	N/A
Console XS	60/100	N/A
Eurogamer	N/A	6/10
GameSpot	N/A	2.7/10
Game Informer	6.75/10	N/A
IGN	N/A	5.5/10
Nintendo Magazine System	86%	N/A
NintendoLife	N/A	3/10
Super Gamer	73%	N/A
Total!	68%	N/A

Some retrospective reviews complimented the gameplay. A reviewer in Nintendo Magazine System stated that the game provided plenty of exploration and beat 'em up action, while Game Informer complimented the unique powers of the playable characters, such as being able to swap between them and take advantage of their abilities. Game Informer, and other publications such as Super Gamer and GameSpot found the difficulty to be its downfall, with a reviewer summarizing that "stages aren't so much challenging as they are unfair". IGN, GameSpot and NintendoLife found the game had enemies that would respawn too often and would appear too close to the player character on-screen while moving. A reviewer from Allgame found the player would die too often which was further hindered by the lack of continue options. A review in Eurogamer found the game superior to the Teenage Mutant Ninja Turtles (1989) arcade game, referring to it as a "mindless sack of rancid amphibian muck". The reviewer found the NES game more ambitious, but still having poor design with its platforming stages.

Reviewers also commented on the theme and graphics. While Super Gamer wrote that the game had "excellent animation and sound", both Total! and Console XS found the graphics to be dated by the early 1990s. IGN also said the game featured "an abundance of graphical glitches and slowdown." While AllGame recommended the game to fans of the television series, IGN, GameSpot and NintendoLife found the game lacked recognizable characters from the show and had an abundance of what NintendoLife described as "baddies are just generic looking and could be from any other action platform game instead."

Reviewing the game for its Wii Virtual Console release, IGN and GameSpot also critiqued the price for being 600 Wii Points ($6 USD), which was 100 more Wii points than the other NES games available, with Gamespot reviewer Frank Provo calling the price "insane".The price was attributed to licensing costs in a Nintendo Life review of the release.

== Legacy ==
The NES version was voted as the year's best game by readers as part of the magazine's annual Nintendo Power Awards. Computer Entertainer awarded it the "Game of the Year" for the NES at their 1989 Video Game Awards ceremony at the CES. Game Players magazine had their first Videogame and Computer Game Awards for 1989 and included the NES version in their "Videogame Excellence Awards" awards listing.

Teenage Mutant Ninja Turtles established a long-running theme within games based on pizza acting as health recovery items. This feature would be in nearly all games based on the series after. Subsequent TMNT games were put into production to take advantage of the popularity of the franchise in the early 1990s. Konami's next TMNT video game was Teenage Mutant Ninja Turtles (1989) for video game arcades. In addition to the arcade title Turtles in Time (1991) and console games Manhattan Project (1991), The Hyperstone Heist (1992), and Tournament Fighters (1993) Konami also released a trilogy of games for Nintendo's Game Boy: Fall of the Foot Clan (1990), Back from the Sewers (1991), and Radical Rescue (1993). The company would also release handheld electronic games during this time, and Teenage Mutant Ninja Turtles: Manhattan Missions for MS-DOS-based computers. Towards the mid-1990s, the Teenage Mutant Ninja Turtles experienced a downturn in popularity leading to no new video games to be released for the second half of the 1990s.

Following the release of the TMNT television series in 2003, Konami released a few more new games for the franchise in the early 2000s, which Game Informer described as only having "a fraction of the success of the original titles from more than a decade ago." Ubisoft would secure the license to create new TMNT games in 2006 starting with a game to coincide with the release of the film TMNT (2007).

== See also ==
- List of best-selling Nintendo Entertainment System video games
- List of Konami games
