= Bebop and Rocksteady =

- Bebop (front) and Rocksteady (back) on a variant cover of Teenage Mutant Ninja Turtles #115 (March 2021). Art by Kevin Eastman.

Publication information
- Publisher: Mirage Comics
- First appearance: Teenage Mutant Ninja Turtles "Turtle Tracks (December 1987)"
- First comic appearance: Teenage Mutant Ninja Turtles Adventures #1 (August 1988)
- Created by: Peter Laird; David Wise

In-story information
- Full name: Bebop: Anton Zeck or Genealdo; Rocksteady: Ivan Steranko, Owen Rockstead, or Maxence
- Species: Bebop: Common warthog mutant Rocksteady: Black rhinoceros mutant
- Team affiliations: Foot Clan
- Partnerships: Shredder
- Abilities: Bebop: Enhanced condition; Enhanced strength; Enhanced bite (via tusks); Enhanced smell; Rocksteady: Enhanced condition; Enhanced strength; Enhanced hearing; Razor sharp horn

Bebop and Rocksteady are a fictional duo of mutant warthog and rhinoceros that have made appearances in various media releases of the Teenage Mutant Ninja Turtles franchise. The two characters are henchmen who follow the orders of the franchise's chief antagonist, Shredder, the leader of the Foot Clan. Their names are both derived from genres of music: Bebop is a style of jazz, while rocksteady is a Jamaican music style, a precursor to reggae.

== Character creation ==
The characters were designed by Peter Laird while negotiating the Teenage Mutant Ninja Turtles action figure deal with Playmates Toys, because they wanted more characters to release. They were added to the 1987 Teenage Mutant Ninja Turtles animated television series and given names, personalities, and an origin story by writer David Wise, based on instructions by Fred Wolf to "put more mutants in the series".

== Transition to comic books and publication history ==
=== Archie Comics ===
Bebop and Rocksteady were featured in the comic book series Teenage Mutant Ninja Turtles Adventures, with similar origins and dimwittedness. As told in the animated series, they were street gang members mutated by Shredder to help him defeat the turtles.

As the series progresses, Bebop and Rocksteady come to believe that they were once normal animals. When Shredder and his bunch are defeated by the TMNT in the 'Final Conflict' (issue #13), Cherubae teleports Rocksteady and Bebop to an Eden World, a planet in Dimension X where they can live peacefully.

In issues #23-#25, Krang, who was banished to the planet Morbus for exiled criminals, befriends two other criminals, Slash and Bellybomb. The group steals a spaceship and head to Earth, during which they stop on Eden World. Being bored of Paradise, Rocksteady and Bebop join Krang's group on the trip back to Earth. However, rather than battle the turtles, Bebop and Rocksteady leave Krang and the villains to fight the turtles and go off on their own in New York City. Just as the turtles managed to defeat Krang (who had taken over Shredder's body), Rocksteady and Bebop arrive with a group of freed zoo animals, intending to take them back to Eden World. The turtles surrender and let Bebop and Rocksteady escape in the spaceship with the animals. Leonardo asks them to take the defeated Krang and Bellybomb with them back to Morbus in Dimension X. Bebop and Rocksteady do as asked and return to Eden World.

=== IDW Comics ===
Bebop and Rocksteady are shown in their human forms in Teenage Mutant Ninja Turtles: Micro Series #1 (December 2011). They work alongside a mutant arctic fox mutant named Alopex and appear mutated in Teenage Mutant Ninja Turtles #25 (August 2013). Their back story is told in Teenage Mutant Ninja Turtles: Villains Micro-Series #7 (October 2013). Bebop was originally a man named Genealdo and Rocksteady was originally a man named Maxence.

In this version, they fully understood the implications of their mutation, having successfully fought and defeated all other candidates for the right after being defeated by the Turtles as humans as Genealdo was mutated into a mutant warthog and Maxence was mutated into a mutant white rhinoceros. It is revealed in the micro-series that having been kicked out of gangs in the past owing to their incompetence, they are fanatically determined to remain in the Foot Clan.

They were ordered by Shredder to kill Donatello, which they carried out. Rocksteady smashed Donatello's shell with a sledgehammer, leaving the Turtle in a pool of blood. However, Donatello clung to life long enough for his consciousness to be temporarily transferred into the robot Metalhead while his turtle body was being restored. After Shredder's death in issue #50, Bebop and Rocksteady desert the Foot and, after inadvertently coming into contact with Savanti Romero and his stolen Time Scepter, wreak so much havoc across the multiverse that all reality is pushed to the brink of obliteration; the Turtles and Renet barely avert the catastrophe.

== In other media ==
=== Television ===
==== Teenage Mutant Ninja Turtles (1987–1996) ====
Bebop (left) and Rocksteady (right) as they appeared in the original 1987 animated series.

Bebop (voiced by Barry Gordon in most appearances, Greg Berg in some 1989 episodes) and Rocksteady (voiced by Cam Clarke) were introduced in the series as members of a human street gang in New York City that was employed by Shredder. Rocksteady, the gang's leader, was a short and stocky blond Caucasian man. Bebop, the second-in-command, is a taller African American man with a purple mohawk. With their fellow gang members Scrag, Grunt, Dopey, and Dumbo, they were sent out to stop reporter April O'Neil from doing a report about crime in the city. April flees into the sewers while being chased by the street gang and meets the Teenage Mutant Ninja Turtles, who defeat the gang in a fight.

After this humiliating setback, Shredder developed a plan to defeat the Turtles by mutating members of the street gang that Rocksteady and Bebop are a part of so that they would have abilities greater than the Turtles'. Rocksteady and Bebop both volunteer to undergo the procedure first with the promise that it would allow them to exact revenge on the Turtles. Although the transformation did make them larger and stronger, they remain incompetent.

==== Teenage Mutant Ninja Turtles (2012–2017) ====
Rocksteady and Bebop as they appear in the 2012 animated series.

Bebop and Rocksteady appear in the 2012 incarnation, voiced by J. B. Smoove and Fred Tatasciore respectively.

Rocksteady is introduced as Ivan Steranko, a Russian arms dealer, and artifact collector, an old friend and business partner of Shredder. He first appears in the episode "Enemy of My Enemy," where he meets with Shredder for a weapons deal. Shredder does not seem to trust him and has the cargo searched in case Steranko was pulling any tricks.

Bebop was later on introduced as Anton Zeck, an African American professional thief in a high-tech suit. He first appears in "The Legend of the Kuro Kabuto," where he was sent by Steranko to steal Shredder's helmet, the titular Kuro Kabuto. Following his theft, Zeck runs into the Turtles, who steal the kabuto from him.

In the episodes "Serpent Hunt" and "The Pig and the Rhino", Steranko and Zeck resolve to capture Karai in exchange for Shredder securing their safe departure from the city. Steranko and Zeck are successful, but Shredder is livid at the revelation that Steranko was behind the theft of the Kabuto helmet and that Karai escaped when the Turtles interfered. An enraged Shredder has the duo mutated in Baxter Stockman's lab. After being made Foot Clan members against their will, Bebop and Rocksteady are sent after Karai before deciding to go after the Turtles instead out of misplaced revenge.

After Shredder is killed, Tiger Claw becomes the new leader of the Foot and presses Bebop and Rocksteady back into service. After the demo dragon Kavaxas resurrects Shredder as an undead being, Bebop and Rocksteady abandon the Foot Clan out of fear.

==== Tales of the Teenage Mutant Ninja Turtles (2024-2025) ====
Bebop and Rocksteady appear in season two of the Teenage Mutant Ninja Turtles: Mutant Mayhem spin-off Tales of the Teenage Mutant Ninja Turtles, with Bebop voiced by Seth Rogen and Rocksteady having no dialogue. In "Raph Fights Everyone", they are among the mutants that fall under the mind-control of Kitsune.

=== Film ===
- Bebop and Rocksteady were originally intended to be included in Teenage Mutant Ninja Turtles II: The Secret of the Ooze. However, the two were replaced with original characters Tokka and Rahzar, partially due to having to go through legal clearances for the characters and partially to expand the Ninja Turtles brand.
- Bebop and Rocksteady are mentioned in the song "Shell Shock" by Gym Class Heroes, featuring during the end credits of TMNT.
- Bebop and Rocksteady appear in Turtles Forever, voiced by Braford Cameron and Johnny Castro respectively. Their human forms are also seen when the Turtles first travel back to the 1987 dimension. In a flashback describing how the Turtles crossed dimensions, they said to their Turtle counterparts that they were facing off against Shredder and the Technodrome, meaning that he got the machine out of Dimension X (as well as Rocksteady and Bebop). Their incompetence is still shown, although it ended up saving the 2003 Shredder when Rocksteady accidentally tripped over and unplugged a laser that was about to destroy him, although Bebop ended up obliterating the 2003 Shredder anyway when he re-plugged the same laser device all the while thinking he would be pleased that they "fixed" his machine.
- Bebop and Rocksteady were planned to be included in the 2014 Teenage Mutant Ninja Turtles film, but they did not make it into the final draft.
- Bebop and Rocksteady appear in Teenage Mutant Ninja Turtles: Out of the Shadows, portrayed by Gary Anthony Williams and Sheamus respectively. While Bebop's true name is Anton Zeck, the rap sheet in prison guard Casey Jones' hand lists Rocksteady as Owen Rocksteed. Originally, they were two criminals being transported at the same time as Shredder, after they provide assistance in Shredder's rescue and escape themselves, he selects them as test subjects for a new variation of the mutagen. Bebop and Rocksteady are powerful fighters but intellectually limited, though portrayed as more competent than their animated counterparts.
- Bebop and Rocksteady appear in Teenage Mutant Ninja Turtles: Mutant Mayhem, voiced by Seth Rogen and John Cena respectively. Depicted as mutated animals rather than transfigured humans, this version of the duo are members of Superfly's gang. While Rocksteady has some arm tattoos like some of his previous incarnations, Bebop is shown to have some tattoos and more piercings on his body. Unlike previous incarnations, the two of them end up reforming near the end when they realize that they do not want to follow Superfly's plan to kill humans and team up with the Turtles to defeat him. Bebop, Rocksteady, and the rest of Superfly's gang move in with Splinter and the Turtles.

=== Video games ===
- Bebop and Rocksteady appear as bosses in the NES game Teenage Mutant Ninja Turtles.
- Bebop and Rocksteady appear as bosses in the arcade game Teenage Mutant Ninja Turtles. In the game, the Turtles defeat Rocksteady in the first level and Bebop in the second level, and then have a rematch with Rocksteady and Bebop together immediately before rescuing April. When the game was released on the NES, the rematch with Rocksteady and Bebop was replaced with a second battle with Baxter Stockman.
- Bebop and Rocksteady appear as bosses in Teenage Mutant Ninja Turtles III: The Manhattan Project. In this version, Bebop is armed with a head-mounted ball and chain.
- Bebop and Rocksteady appear as bosses in Teenage Mutant Ninja Turtles: Fall of the Foot Clan.
- Bebop and Rocksteady appear as bosses in Teenage Mutant Ninja Turtles II: Back from the Sewers.
- Bebop and Rocksteady appear as bosses in Teenage Mutant Ninja Turtles: Manhattan Missions.
- Bebop and Rocksteady appear in the Super NES version of Teenage Mutant Ninja Turtles: Turtles in Time.
- Rocksteady appears as a boss in Teenage Mutant Ninja Turtles: The Hyperstone Heist.
- Bebop and Rocksteady appear in the background of the Mount Olympus arena in the Super NES version of Teenage Mutant Ninja Turtles: Tournament Fighters.
- Bebop and Rocksteady appear as bosses in Teenage Mutant Ninja Turtles, voiced by André Sogliuzzo and Cam Clarke respectively.
- Bebop and Rocksteady appear as bosses in Teenage Mutant Ninja Turtles: Mutants in Manhattan, voiced by Tim Dadabo and Fred Tatasciore respectively.
- Bebop and Rocksteady appear as bosses in Teenage Mutant Ninja Turtles: Shredder's Revenge, reprised by Barry Gordon and Cam Clarke respectively.
- Bebop is mentioned in Injustice 2 by Leonardo as a random clash quote.
- Bebop and Rocksteady appear in Teenage Mutant Ninja Turtles: Mutants Unleashed (which is set in the same continuity as Mutant Mayhem), voiced by Max Koch and Fred Tatasciore respectively. They carelessly throw a concert with Ray Fillet as their front man until it gets stopped by the Ninja Turtles.
- Rocksteady appears in Nickelodeon All-Star Brawl 2 as a playable character via downloadable content, voiced again by Cam Clarke.
- Bebop and Rocksteady appear in Fortnite Battle Royale via purchasable outfits as part of the second wave of cosmetics based on Teenage Mutant Ninja Turtles.

=== Action figures ===
Bebop and Rocksteady were among the first 10 action figures released by Playmates Toys in 1988. Bebop and Rocksteady saw continuous release from 1988 to 1995. Three years later both Bebop and Rocksteady were reissued as KB Toys exclusives commemorating 10 years of the first toy line. The reissues have the date stamps changed from 1988 to 1998. Both figures were reissued again in 2009 to commemorate the 25th anniversary of the Teenage Mutant Ninja Turtles franchise. Other figure incarnations of Bebop and Rocksteady were produced for the Wacky Action, Night Ninjas, Mutant Military 2, Mutation, Smash 'em/Bash 'em, Tournament Fighters, Sewer Heroes, and Warriors of the Forgotten Sewer sub lines and in 13 in. "Giant" scale. In late 2013, figures of Bebop and Rocksteady were released for the Classic Collection toy line.
