= Teenage Mutant Ninja Turtles (arcade game) =

1989 video game

- Arcade flyer
- Developers: Konami; Probe Software (Amiga)
- Publishers: Konami: WW: Konami (arcade/consoles); NA: Dynamo Corp. (arcade); UK: Brent Leisure (arcade) Image Works (computers) Ubisoft (Xbox 360)
- Directors: Hideki Ohyama; K. Takabayashi (Arcade); H. Toyoda (NES)
- Producer: Masahiro Inoue
- Programmers: Gen Suzuki; Sadaki Matsumoto (Arcade); Kouki Yamashita; Yūji Shibata (NES)
- Artists: M. Moriyama; K. Hattori; Yuji Asano; Kouki Yamashita (Arcade); Junko Maruo; Masaaki Kishimoto (NES)
- Composers: Mutsuhiko Izumi; Miki Higashino (Arcade); Kozo Nakamura (NES)
- Series: Teenage Mutant Ninja Turtles
- Platforms: Arcade, NES, Amiga, Amstrad CPC, Atari ST, Commodore 64, MS-DOS, ZX Spectrum, Xbox 360
- Release: October 11, 1989: Arcade; NA: October 11, 1989; EU: October 1989; AU: Late 1989; HK: December 1989; JP: June 1990 NES; JP: December 7, 1990; NA: December 1990; EU: November 14, 1991 Home computers; EU: 1991 Xbox 360; NA: March 14, 2007; AU: October 31, 2007
- Genre: Beat 'em up
- Modes: Single-player, multiplayer
- Arcade system: PlayChoice-10

Teenage Mutant Ninja Turtles, released in Japan as Teenage Mutant Ninja Turtles: Super Kame Ninja (Note: Japanese: Teenage Mutant Ninja Turtles 〜スーパー亀忍者〜, Hepburn: Teenage Mutant Ninja Turtles: Sūpā Kame Ninja; lit. "Teenage Mutant Ninja Turtles: Super Turtle Ninja") and in Europe as Teenage Mutant Hero Turtles, is a 1989 beat 'em up video game developed and published by Konami for arcades. It is based on the Teenage Mutant Ninja Turtles franchise, including the first animated series that began airing two years earlier. In the game, up to four players control the titular Ninja Turtles, fighting through various levels to defeat the turtles' enemies, including the Shredder, Krang and the Foot Clan. Released during a high point in popularity for the Teenage Mutant Ninja Turtles franchise, the arcade game was a worldwide hit, becoming the highest-grossing dedicated arcade game of 1990 in the United States and Konami's highest-grossing arcade game. Versions for various home systems soon followed, including the Nintendo Entertainment System (under the title Teenage Mutant Ninja Turtles II: The Arcade Game). A sequel, Teenage Mutant Ninja Turtles: Turtles in Time, was released in 1991.

== Gameplay ==
The player chooses from one of the four Ninja Turtles: Leonardo, Michelangelo, Donatello, and Raphael. Depending on the version of the game, the characters are either chosen via an in-game select screen or based on which coin slot the player placed their credit into. After Shredder kidnaps the Turtles' friend April O'Neil and their mentor Splinter, they must give chase, save their comrades, and defeat the evil Shredder. Up to four players (two in some versions) can take control of any of the Turtles. Donatello has slower attacks but a longer range, Michelangelo and Raphael have faster attacks but a shorter range, and Leonardo is a well-rounded Turtle with average range and speed.

The eight-way joystick controls the movements of the Turtle, the jump button makes them jump and the attack button makes them hit in front of them using their weapon. The Turtles can also perform special moves, including throwing Foot soldiers overhead and performing a special attack by pressing the jump and attack buttons; Raphael rolls along the ground and finishes with a kick, while the other Turtles do a sweeping jump attack with their weapons. The Turtles can also spring off the wall in certain areas. Enemies can be defeated more quickly by slamming them into walls or solid objects. Many objects such as traffic cones, parking meters, fire hydrants and exploding oil drums can be hit or damaged with attacks in order to help defeat nearby enemies. In the attract mode, the game shows the first part of the cartoon opening, along with a portion of the Teenage Mutant Ninja Turtles theme song.

Most of the enemies the Turtles face are the Foot Soldiers, all color-coded to indicate their attack patterns and weapons of choice. Some enemies, such as the standard purple-clad Foot Soldiers and Roadkill Rodney robots, have the ability to restrain the Turtles' mobility and drain their health, leaving only the player open to attack for other enemies. The bosses in the game include Rocksteady and Bebop (individually at first in that order, and later the two of them together), Baxter Stockman (in his human form), Granitor, General Traag, Krang, and Shredder himself.

In Teenage Mutant Ninja Turtles: The Cowabunga Collection, the Arcade version of Teenage Mutant Ninja Turtles has six enhancements.

- Level Select – Allows the player to start at any level of their choosing.
- God Mode – Allows the player to become immune to most damage and defeat most enemies with a single hit.
- Remove Penalty Bombs – This enhancement disables the "Penalty Bombs" that the game drops on players in certain circumstances.
- Nightmare Mode − Enables a mode in the game that dramatically increases the number of enemies.
- Starting Lives − Adjusts the number of lives at the start of the game from 1 to 5.
- Difficulty − Adjusts the difficulty of the game from easy to very difficult.

== Development and release ==
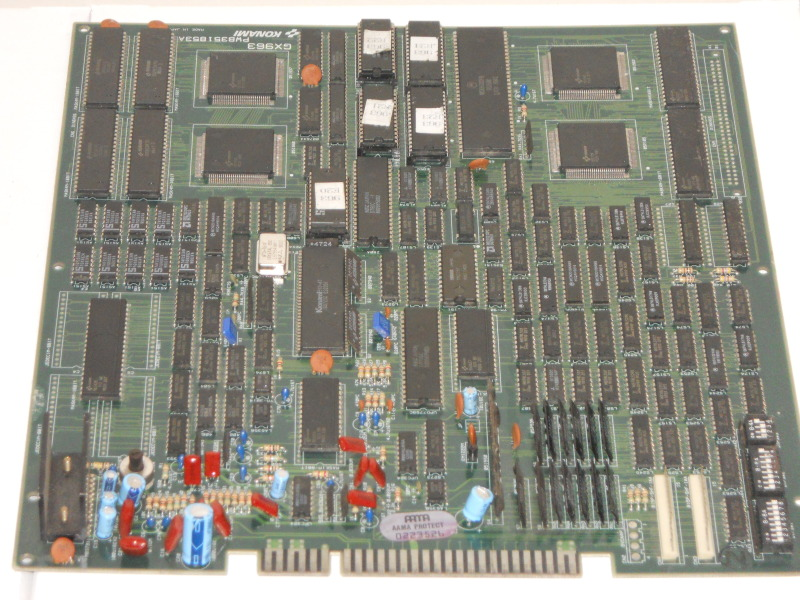
A printed circuit board (PCB) of the arcade game

Konami acquired the license for the Teenage Mutant Ninja Turtles franchise around the same time the animated series began airing in 1987. Konami began development on both an arcade game and console game shortly after. The arcade game was first demonstrated at the AMOA show in September 1989 before it officially debuted a month later in October.

The arcade game was distributed as Teenage Mutant Ninja Turtles: Super Kame Ninja in Japan, Teenage Mutant Ninja Turtles in North America, Oceania and continental Europe, and Teenage Mutant Hero Turtles in the United Kingdom. The game was released primarily as a dedicated four-player arcade cabinet in all regions except Japan, where it was sold as a 2-player conversion kit. 2-player conversion kits of the game were released in other regions, serving as less expensive alternatives to 4-player cabinets.

== Home versions ==
=== Ports to home systems ===
Cover artwork of the NES version, which was retitled Teenage Mutant Ninja Turtles II: The Arcade Game. The publisher is credited here as Ultra Games, a shell corporation and subsidiary of Konami of America.

The game was ported to the Nintendo Entertainment System in 1990. This conversion was titled Teenage Mutant Ninja Turtles II: The Arcade Game in order to avoid confusion with the previous NES game based on the franchise. The Japanese Famicom version was titled Teenage Mutant Ninja Turtles, without a number nor a subtitle, due to the fact that the first NES game was localized in Japan under a different title.

The NES version features two additional levels and bosses, one of which is a snowy Central Park where players fight an alien bounty hunter named "Tora".

This version includes two new levels (the first part of Scene 3 and all of Scene 6), which feature new enemy characters, including two new bosses created specifically for the NES port: Tora (a Polar Bear-like "blizzard beast") and Shogun (a robotic samurai). Most of the original stages from the arcade version were extended as well, and the second half of Scene 3, the parking garage stage, replaces the arcade version's end battle with both Bebop and Rocksteady with a battle against the mutated fly form of Baxter Stockman. The NES port appeared in Nintendo's PlayChoice-10 arcade system.

The NES version featured notable product placement advertising: Pizza Hut logos. The rear cover of the instruction manual provided a coupon for the restaurant, with an expiration date of December 31, 1991.

Computer ports of the arcade game were released by Image Works and ported by Probe Software in 1991 for the ZX Spectrum, Amiga, Amstrad CPC, Atari ST, DOS PC and Commodore 64. The title was changed to Teenage Mutant Hero Turtles: The Coin Op in the European versions, reflecting censorship of the 1987 TV series in certain regions at the time.

=== Emulated releases ===
An emulated version of the arcade game is included as a hidden bonus game in Teenage Mutant Ninja Turtles 2: Battle Nexus for the PlayStation 2, Xbox, and GameCube, but with altered music and most of the voice clips edited out. The game is unlocked by finding an antique in Stage 9–1; the antique turns out to be the original arcade machine.

An Xbox 360 version of the game was released via Xbox Live Arcade under the name TMNT 1989 Classic Arcade on March 14, 2007, published by Ubisoft under license from Konami and ported by Digital Eclipse. The game was priced at 400 Microsoft Points. Like other classic arcade games on the Xbox 360 platform, portions of the original arcade game were emulated with network code and other new features added. Players could earn achievements as well as play 2-4 player co-op (both online and offline). Unlike the unlockable in Battle Nexus, this rerelease retains the music and voices of the 1989 arcade game.

In 2019, the game was re-released as a replica arcade cabinet for home use by manufacturer Arcade1Up. The reissue is nearly identical to the original, but there are a few changes: the opening theme is a new recording by a different singer, players do not need to insert quarters to play, and Konami's name on the arcade marquee is replaced by Nickelodeon's.

The arcade and NES versions of the game were re-released as part of Teenage Mutant Ninja Turtles: The Cowabunga Collection in 2022.

== Reception ==
=== Commercial ===
The arcade game was a blockbuster hit, especially in North America. Konami was unable to keep up with high demand and outsourced additional US manufacturing production to Dynamo Corp. The release of the Teenage Mutant Ninja Turtles film in March 1990 gave the arcade game a further boost in earnings. By early April 1990, Konami had sold over 20,000 arcade cabinets internationally outside of Japan, including over 14,000 cabinets sold in the United States, where it became the biggest arcade hit since Double Dragon (1987). By early May 1990, the game had sold 25,000 arcade cabinets in North America and Europe, with more units still in production to meet continued demand at the time.

In North America, Teenage Mutant Ninja Turtles was the highest-grossing upright cabinet on the RePlay arcade charts from January through spring, summer and autumn to December 1990. During November and December, weekly coin drop earnings averaged $163 per cabinet. It ended the year as the highest-grossing dedicated arcade game of 1990 in the United States, and it won a Diamond award from the American Amusement Machine Association (AAMA) for sales achievement in 1990.

The game was also a major hit in Europe, particularly the United Kingdom, where it was one of the top four highest-grossing arcade games during early 1990 (along with Tecmo World Cup '90, Super Masters, and Line of Fire). On Hong Kong's Bondeal charts, Teenage Mutant Ninja Turtles was the top-grossing dedicated arcade game from December 1989 to January 1990. In Australia, the game was a record-breaking arcade hit in 1990 with high earnings during its first six months on the market, which was unusual for licensed arcade games which typically disappeared after several months. In Japan, Game Machine listed Teenage Mutant Ninja Turtles as the fourth most popular arcade game of August 1990.

The NES port Teenage Mutant Ninja Turtles II sold over 600,000 units in two weeks before Christmas 1990 and went on to sell over 1 million units as of 1991. The Xbox Live Arcade digital version of Teenage Mutant Ninja Turtles sold 984,271 units on the Xbox 360 console, as of 2011.

=== Critical ===
Reception

Review scores
Publication	Score
GamePro	23/25 (NES)
Zzap!64	Positive (Arcade)
Hippon Super!	6/10 (NES)

Award
Publication	Award
Sinclair User	Gold

Zzap! reported on the arcade game after it appeared at the Amusement Trades Exhibition International (ATEI), calling it a "great coin-op which is best in four player mode."

British gaming magazine The One reviewed the home computer versions (Amiga, Atari ST, DOS) of Teenage Mutant Ninja Turtles under the British title, Teenage Mutant Hero Turtles, giving credit for the game's graphics and sound, but criticizing the enemy AI and the ports' scrolling, concluding that the game "lacks depth and imagination".

Time's Jared Newman named to his list of "14 Important Arcade Games Not Available for iPhone or iPad", citing the game's pioneering 4-player simultaneous play.

GamesRadar ranked it the 25th best NES game made. The staff attributed the Ninja Turtles' continued success to the game and praised its visuals, audio, and combat system.
