= Teenage Mutant Ninja Turtles: Turtles in Time =

1991 video game

- Arcade flyer
- Developer: Konami
- Publisher: Konami
- Directors: Gen Suzuki (arcade); Yorozuya Juggling Group (Super NES)
- Producer: Masahiro Inoue
- Programmers: K. Takabayashi; Y. Furukawa (arcade); Yasuo Okuda; Toshinori Shimono; Eiji Nakagawa; Shigeki Morihira (Super NES)
- Artists: Masami Inafuku; M. Moriyama; Soichiro Kitai (arcade); Kumiko Ogawa; Masatsugu Hashimoto; Hiromi Sumida (Super NES)
- Composers: Mutsuhiko Izumi (Arcade); Kazuhiko Uehara; Harumi Ueko (Super NES)
- Series: Teenage Mutant Ninja Turtles
- Platforms: Arcade, Super NES
- Release: Arcade: WW: March 1991; Super NES: JP: 24 July 1992; NA: August 1992; EU: 19 November 1992
- Genre: Beat 'em up
- Modes: Single-player, multiplayer

Teenage Mutant Ninja Turtles: Turtles in Time, released as Teenage Mutant Hero Turtles: Turtles in Time in Europe, is a 1991 beat 'em up game developed and published by Konami for arcades. A sequel to the original Teenage Mutant Ninja Turtles arcade game, it is a side-scrolling game based mainly on the 1987 TMNT animated series. Originally an arcade game, Turtles in Time was ported to the Super Nintendo Entertainment System in 1992 under the title Teenage Mutant Ninja Turtles IV: Turtles in Time, continuing the numbering from the earlier Turtles games released on the original NES. That same year, a game that borrowed many elements, Teenage Mutant Ninja Turtles: The Hyperstone Heist, was released for the Sega Genesis.

In 2005, the arcade version of Turtles in Time was rereleased on newer consoles. A slightly altered version of the arcade game was included as an unlockable bonus in the 2005 game Teenage Mutant Ninja Turtles 3: Mutant Nightmare. On August 5, 2009, Ubisoft released a 3D remake of the game, Teenage Mutant Ninja Turtles: Turtles in Time Re-Shelled, available as a download for Xbox 360 via Xbox Live Arcade. A downloadable PlayStation 3 version was later released via PlayStation Network on September 10, 2009.

== Plot ==
The introductory cut scene of the game details the game's plot. It begins with the Turtles watching a TV newscast on a Sunday evening, with April O'Neil reporting from Liberty Island. Super Krang flies in and steals the Statue of Liberty, moments before Shredder hijacks the airwaves to laugh at the Turtles.

The Turtles jump into action in downtown New York and pursue the Foot to the streets and the city sewers (then to the Technodrome in the Super NES version), where Shredder sends them through a time warp. The Turtles must fight Shredder's army in both the past and the future in order to get home. They defeat Shredder and the Statue of Liberty is returned to its place.

== Gameplay ==
Like its predecessor, Turtles in Time was available for the arcades in two- and four-player versions. In the two-player versions, each player gets to choose which of the four turtles they wish to control, whereas in the four-player versions the characters are assigned to the control panel from left to right in the following order: Leonardo, Michelangelo, Donatello, and Raphael. Each playable character has his own strengths and weaknesses. New features include the ability to execute a power attack by hitting an enemy several times in a row, and the ability to slam foot soldiers into surrounding enemies.

The game features the same control scheme of the previous arcade release. It uses a joystick for movement, an attack button and a jump button. Certain joystick/button combinations can make a Turtle run, perform a slide or dash attack, jump higher, perform a stationary or directed air attack, or perform a special attack.

Players guide the turtles through a series of levels. The first takes place in the streets of New York City, others transport the turtles to representations of various historical eras. In each level, players face enemies from both the 1987 cartoon and the feature film Teenage Mutant Ninja Turtles II: The Secret of the Ooze, including foot soldiers, and stone warriors. Bosses featured in the arcade version are Baxter Stockman, in his fly form, Metalhead, a group of Pizza Monsters, Cement Man, the duo of Tokka and Rahzar, Leatherhead, Super Krang, Krang piloting a UFO, and Shredder.

== Development ==
The original music of the game's soundtrack was composed by Mutsuhiko Izumi, a TMNT veteran who also composed the music for the previous arcade game in the series. It was arranged for the Super NES version by Kazuhiko Uehara and Harumi Ueko, both of whom went on to produce several Konami games, including the following TMNT game, Tournament Fighters.

During development, the game's working title was "something like TMNT Time Travelers", according to Konami USA's Steve Kaufman in early 1991.

In addition to an original musical score, the attract mode of the arcade game is noted for featuring the song "Pizza Power", which was taken from the TMNT live concert, known as the Coming Out of Their Shells Tour. The game's music was released as part of the compilation album Konami All-Stars 1993 ~ Music Station of Dreams, published by King Records in 1992.

The 2005 version of the game included in Mutant Nightmare features new music and voices updated to match the 2003 TMNT series. This was also the case for Turtles in Time: Re-Shelled.

== Releases ==
=== Arcade ===
Like the original Turtles arcade game, Turtles in Time was released for the arcades as a dedicated 4-player cabinet, as well as a 2-player conversion kit. Unlike the first game, Turtles in Time was not distributed for the arcades in Japan.

=== Super NES ===
North American Super NES cover art, retitled Teenage Mutant Ninja Turtles IV: Turtles in Time

The second part of the Super NES-exclusive "Technodrome: Let's Kick Shell!" level features a fight sequence in an elevator.

The Super NES version was retitled Teenage Mutant Ninja Turtles IV: Turtles in Time in North America and Australia and Teenage Mutant Hero Turtles IV: Turtles in Time in Europe in order to continue the numbering from the first three Turtles games on the NES (despite the fact that Teenage Mutant Ninja Turtles III: The Manhattan Project was never released in the PAL region). However, the Super Famicom version in Japan retained the original unnumbered title.

Much like Teenage Mutant Ninja Turtles II: The Arcade Game for the NES (a conversion of the first arcade game), the Super NES version of Turtles in Time has some notable differences in presentation. While the Super NES version is missing some animations and graphics effects from the arcade version, it made extensive use of the Super NES's Mode 7 forward scrolling effect in the "Neon Night-Riders" level, changing it to an over-the-shoulder perspective. Contrary to popular belief, mode 7 is not used for throwing the enemy foot soldiers, as it cannot scale sprites nor is any scaling actually shown.

Sounds also differ between the arcade and Super NES versions. The Super NES version is missing certain voice samples for both the turtles and boss characters. In addition, the arcade version's title theme song, "Pizza Power", was replaced with an instrumental version of the cartoon theme song.

Various alterations were made to the Super NES version's gameplay. "Sewer Surfin'" and "Neon Night-Riders" were changed to bonus levels of a sort, where, unlike in the arcade original, the number of enemies defeated and bonus pizzas collected are tracked and based on which bonus points are awarded to the player(s) before to entering the level's boss battle. A new Technodrome stage was added, which features a boss battle with Shredder sitting in a battle tank in the foreground which requires the player to hit the tank with foot soldiers thrown at the screen. Several enemies were changed in the Super NES version. Four other bosses were added: the Rat King was added at the end of the "Sewer Surfin'" level, Slash replaced Cement Man in the prehistoric level, and on the pirate ship level, the duo of Bebop and Rocksteady replaced Tokka and Rahzar, who were moved to the new Technodrome level. The game changes the final battle with Shredder to Super Shredder from Teenage Mutant Ninja Turtles II: The Secret of the Ooze. The Super NES version adds two regular enemies: Roadkill Rodneys (which replaced the boxing robots) and Mousers.

The Super NES version features a time-trial mode and a two-player versus fight mode. Like the arcade version, each turtle was given unique attributes in areas such as speed and strength. In addition, the move to throw enemies off-screen can now be performed intentionally (instead of just randomly), a technique specifically required at the end of the Technodrome level.

=== Emulated re-releases ===
An emulated conversion of the original arcade game can be unlocked after completing the first batch of missions in Teenage Mutant Ninja Turtles 3: Mutant Nightmare. The game is emulated from the four-player version. Differences include the lack of a score counter, an entirely new soundtrack (likely due to rights issues with the original soundtrack), altered voices, and a slightly choppy frame rate compared to the arcade. Much like the version it was based on, the characters are assigned by controller. This means that Donatello and Raphael are not playable in the PlayStation 2 version without a multitap, as the base console only has two controller slots. The new soundtrack is a re-arranged version from the Nintendo DS version of Mutant Nightmare.

The arcade and Super NES versions of the game were re-released as part of Teenage Mutant Ninja Turtles: The Cowabunga Collection in 2022.

== Reception ==
Reception

Aggregate score
Aggregator	Score	
Aggregator	Arcade	SNES
GameRankings		83% (7 reviews)

Review scores
Publication	Score	
Publication	Arcade	SNES
AllGame	4/5	
Electronic Gaming Monthly		9/10, 9/10, 9/10, 9/10
Famitsu		7/10, 7/10, 6/10, 6/10
Mean Machines		80%
Nintendo Power		4/5
Game Zero		84.5/100
Game Zone		93%
Nintendojo		9.4/10
Play Meter	9/10	
SNES Force		75%

Following its release, Turtles in Time became Konami's best-selling arcade title. In the United States, the home console conversion was the top-selling Super NES game in September 1992.

=== Reviews ===
The arcade game received positive reviews. Although critics found that the second game was largely similar to the previous arcade game, they felt that it was a net improvement over its predecessor on all points, including graphics, music and gameplay. Overall, the game was hailed for staying true to its source material.

The Super NES version was praised for its additional stages and gameplay modes. The four reviewers of Electronic Gaming Monthly gave it unanimous scores of 9 out of 10 each, applauding the fun gameplay, the new moves, the accurate recreation of the arcade version's graphics, and the two-player versus mode, though they criticized that the game is too easy. The Super NES game was lauded in Allgame for its visuals, which replicate the cartoon's art style. Nintendojo called Teenage Mutant Ninja Turtles IV: Turtles in Time the best Ninja Turtles game of all time.

Entertainment Weekly wrote that "The Turtles may have peaked on the big screen, but in video-game land they're just reaching their potential."

Game Zero magazine's four reviewers gave the game a combined review score of 84.5 out of 100, they praised the graphics and the option to switch between the animation and comic book style graphics and gave praise to the game's music, improved moveset and voice acting. The only criticism given was the game being too easy even when played on hard mode. Super Gamer gave an overall review score of 90% calling the game “Highly impressive cartoon platform beat-em-up.”

=== Accolades ===
Nintendo Power ranked the game 7th in their "Top 10 in 1992" praising the characters being well animated concluding: "the popularity of Konami's TMNT series with players and the new theme of time travel put this one into our year end top 10." IGN ranked the game 39th in their "Top 100 SNES Games of All Time", praising the bright graphics that captures the look and personality of the classic cartoon and praising the utilization of mode 7 when throwing enemies into the screen. GamesRadar ranked the game #24 in their "Best SNES Games of All Time", they praised the game music and commenting that Turtles in Time improved everything the original Turtles game did and made it better and felt the game was "one of the best action games on the SNES" In 2013, Arcade Sushi ranked Turtles in Time 10th on their "10 Best Retro Beat 'Em Ups." They praised the game's aesthetics staying true to the franchise's cartoon series. In 2018, Complex listed the game 9th in its "The Best Super Nintendo Games of All Time." In 2023, Time Extension included the Super NES version on their top 25 "Best Beat 'Em Ups of All Time" list. They called it the best game in the series.

== Remake ==
The 2009 remake, Teenage Mutant Ninja Turtles: Turtles in Time Re-Shelled, features new graphics and sounds. The graphics were remade in 3D, with players moving in and out of a true 3D camera. The opening and closing cinematics were remade with a stylized 2D look. The vocal quips of the arcade version return, re-recorded by the cast of the 2003 cartoon. The music was also re-done.

Re-Shelled was based on the original arcade machine, rather than on the Super NES version. As a result, the extra stages and enemy characters from the earlier home version were excluded. The gameplay remained similar, except that players can attack in eight directions. The game can also be played online with up to four players. This version also features a Survival mode, Quickplay mode, multiple difficulties and Achievements/Trophy support.
