= Teenage Mutant Ninja Turtles: The Hyperstone Heist =

1992 video game

- North American cover artwork
- Developer: Konami
- Publisher: Konami
- Composers: Masahiro Ikariko; Yuichi Takamine; Kaori Kinouchi; Hideto Inoue
- Series: Teenage Mutant Ninja Turtles
- Platform: Sega Genesis
- Release: NA: December 1992; JP: 22 December 1992; EU: April 1993
- Genre: Beat 'em up
- Modes: Single-player, multiplayer

Teenage Mutant Ninja Turtles: The Hyperstone Heist, released in Europe as Teenage Mutant Hero Turtles: The Hyperstone Heist and in Japan as Teenage Mutant Ninja Turtles: Return of the Shredder, is a 1992 beat 'em up game developed and published by Konami for the Sega Genesis, based on the Teenage Mutant Ninja Turtles comic book characters. It was Konami's debut title for the Genesis. The game was re-released as part of Teenage Mutant Ninja Turtles: The Cowabunga Collection in 2022.

== Plot ==
April O'Neil is reporting from Liberty Island when, in a sudden flash of light, she and her audience witness Manhattan Island suddenly starting to shrink. Shredder then hijacks the airwaves and announces to the world that this was only a demonstration of the power of the Hyperstone, the treasure of Dimension X. With the Hyperstone in his possession, he now has the power to take over the world. The Turtles have no choice but to go after Shredder and stop him.

== Gameplay ==
The gameplay of The Hyperstone Heist is heavily based on the second TMNT arcade game, Turtles in Time, which was ported to the Super NES during the same year. The controls are similar to Turtles in Time, but the ability to dash is assigned to a specific button and the player can't throw enemies towards the screen.

The game shares nearly the same soundtrack and sound effects as Turtles in Time, but the music plays faster in The Hyperstone Heist. Though there are less than half as many levels as Turtles in Time, each level is longer. Furthermore, The Hyperstone Heist has a more aggressive enemy AI and faster-moving gameplay.

There are a total of five levels ("New York City", "A Mysterious Ghost Ship", "Shredder's Hideout", "The Gauntlet", and "The Final Shell Shock"), which comprise a combination of new levels created specifically for this game and ones based on levels from the first arcade game and Turtles in Time. The bosses include Leatherhead, Rocksteady, Tatsu, Baxter Stockman, Krang, and Super Shredder.

== Reception ==
Reception

Review scores
| Publication | Score |
|---|---|
| Electronic Gaming Monthly | 8/10, 8/10, 8/10, 7/10 |
| GameFan | 190/200 |
| GamePro | 19/20 |
| Mega Action | 78% |
| Mega Guide | Positive |
| MegaTech | 87% |
| Power Unlimited | 90% |

The game received positive reviews upon release. In GameFan magazine, Dave Halverson (Skid) said "Konami brings the arcade thrill home" with "a beat 'em up blast-a-minute" that has "some of the best character animation you'll ever see" while Brody said it has some of the "most hilarious 2 player beat 'em up action ever" seen. N. Somniac of GamePro magazine called it "a 16-bit graphic and game playing work of art" and said it "brings excellent arcade-quality graphics, sound, game play to your home unit."

The most common criticisms of The Hyperstone Heist focused on its difficulty, length, and repetitiveness. MegaTech magazine gave an overall 87% score, praising the graphics and sound but commenting that the gameplay wasn't hard work and experienced players would be able to beat the game easily. Four reviewers of Electronic Gaming Monthly gave the game positive ratings, praising the graphics and the animation, although there was criticism for the game being too easy and not having enough levels. Mega Action criticized the game for being too easy and gave praise to its graphics, calling it "fairly impressive." They also commented that The Hyperstone Heist had a lot of potential but used it very sparingly, stating that "Hyperstone Heist isn't a terrible game, but the Turtles do deserve better." They concluded with a 78% review score. Kirk Rutter of Mega Guide praised the game's action, graphics, and the two-player mode, but felt that The Hyperstone Heist was similar to Turtles in Time. Conceding that the action was fun at first, he criticized it for becoming repetitive and the difficulty for being too easy, concluding: "The lack of real challenge knocks a big dent in its lastability. But it's still a laugh." Power Unlimited gave a score of 90% and recommended the game to those who are fans of TMHT, but criticized the repetitive gameplay.

ScrewAttack named The Hyperstone Heist the 19th best Genesis game ever in their top 20 list, though they considered it a clone of Turtles in Time, which they considered to be the best beat 'em up ever. Complex ranked the game number 68 in their "The Best 100 Sega Genesis Games".
