= Teenage Mutant Ninja Turtles II: Back from the Sewers =

1991 video game

- North American cover art
- Developer: Konami
- Publisher: Konami
- Director: Hiroyuki Fukui
- Designer: Masashi Sakurai
- Programmers: Masatsugu Nagata; Hiroyuki Fukui
- Artist: Masashi Sakurai
- Composers: Tsuyoshi Sekito; Yuko Kurahashi
- Series: Teenage Mutant Ninja Turtles
- Platform: Game Boy
- Release: JP: November 15, 1991; NA: December 1991; EU: May 21, 1992
- Genres: Action, platform
- Mode: Single player

Teenage Mutant Ninja Turtles II: Back from the Sewers, released as Teenage Mutant Hero Turtles II: Back from the Sewers in Europe, and Teenage Mutant Ninja Turtles 2 in Japan, is a 1991 action-platform game developed and published by Konami for the Game Boy. It is the sequel to Teenage Mutant Ninja Turtles: Fall of the Foot Clan. The game was re-released as part of Teenage Mutant Ninja Turtles: The Cowabunga Collection in 2022.

== Gameplay ==
Similar to Fall of the Foot Clan, the previous Game Boy game in the series, the player can switch between turtles before each stage. Each turtle has his own strengths and weaknesses. Donatello has a long range of attack, but attacks slowly, Raphael's attack is fast but has a very short range, and Leonardo and Michaelangelo are well-balanced. When a turtle is defeated, he becomes captured by the enemy. The game is over when all turtles are captured. After completing a stage, the player is given the opportunity to rescue a captured turtle by defeating REX-1 in a bonus stage. If no turtles were captured, the player enters a bonus stage instead.

The game features several gameplay elements besides the typical beat-em-ups like dodging huge boulders in the underground levels, going around on skateboards or scaling air lifts, and the game also shifts from being typical 2D just walking left and right to a more open area where the turtles can walk all over the screen. The bosses of the game are the standard villains: Bebop and Rocksteady, Baxter Stockman, General Traag, Granitor The Stone Warrior, Pizza Monsters (Sub Boss), Krang in his walker mech, Shredder, and Super Shredder (Sub Boss), though just like Fall of the Foot Clan, Krang in his robot body serves as the final boss. The game has several difficulty settings which, depending on the level, make more powerful enemies appear or even give the bosses extra attacks.

== Development ==
In the early 1990s, the Teenage Mutant Ninja Turtles franchise experienced a surge in popularity. By December 1990, images from the franchise had been licensed for an estimated 130 products. The Japanese company Konami would capitalize on this, releasing several video games based on the franchise.

Teenage Mutant Ninja Turtles II: Back from the Sewers was Konami's second entry in their Game Boy trilogy, which also includes Teenage Mutant Ninja Turtles: Fall of the Foot Clan (1990) and Teenage Mutant Ninja Turtles III: Radical Rescue (1993).

== Release and reception ==
Reception

Review scores
Publication	Score
Electronic Gaming Monthly	8/10, 6/10, 3/10, 3/10
Famicom Tsūshin	5/10, 6/10, 6/10, 5/10
Hippon Super!	6/10
Video Games & Computer Entertainment	8/10

Teenage Mutant Ninja Turtles II: Back from the Sewers was released for the Game Boy in Japan on November 15, 1991. Among the four reviewers in Famitsu, all four complimented the graphics as being very impressive for the Game Boy but found the game to be a standard action game. Comments on the gameplay ranged from it being monotonous or that outside of boss enemies, you only meet one type of enemy character and they had little variations in their attacks.

Video Games & Computer Entertainment also complimented the graphics but like one reviewer in Famitsu, their review found the animations of the Turtles themselves to be stiff. They also found the game lacked originality, but was a fine example of the "scrolling beat-the-boss fighting" style of game.

GamePro said the game was an improvement over its predecessor, Teenage Mutant Ninja Turtles: Fall of the Foot Clan (1990).

Along with Acclaim's Bart Simpson's Escape from Camp Deadly (1991), Back From the Sewers was among the first Game Boy titles to include digitized speech with a voice sample of "Cowabunga!" before each level and "Pizza time!" when the game is paused.
