= Teenage Mutant Ninja Turtles III: Radical Rescue =

1993 video game

- North American cover art
- Developer: Konami
- Publisher: Konami
- Director: Hiroyuki Fukui
- Programmers: M. Nagata; Y. Fukui
- Composer: M. Matsuhira
- Series: Teenage Mutant Ninja Turtles
- Platform: Game Boy
- Release: November 26, 1993
- Genre: Metroidvania
- Mode: Single player

Teenage Mutant Ninja Turtles III: Radical Rescue (Note: Teenage Mutant Ninja Turtles 3: Turtles Kiki Ippatsu (Teenage Mutant Ninja Turtles 3: タートルズ危機一発 (lit. 'Teenage Mutant Ninja Turtles 3: Turtles in Danger'.) Released as Teenage Mutant Hero Turtles III: Radical Rescue in the United Kingdom.) is a 1993 Metroidvania video game developed and published by Konami for the Game Boy. Based on the Teenage Mutant Ninja Turtles (TMNT) franchise, the player controls a ninja turtle character as they battle enemies, rescue allies, and explore a non-linear maze-like environment. The game borrows plot elements, character design, and art styles from various forms of TMNT media of the era, such as the animated television series and the various comic series.

On the game's release, some publications praised the game as one of the best games for the Game Boy, while others criticized the game's difficulty and lack of originality. Years later, it has been recognized as an early example of the Metroidvania genre, pioneering design elements popularized in Konami's later releases such as Castlevania: Symphony of the Night (1997).

== Background and plot ==
Teenage Mutant Ninja Turtles III: Radical Rescue is a licensed game based on the Teenage Mutant Ninja Turtles. As the third Turtles video game for the Game Boy from Konami, it draws story and visual elements from the Teenage Mutant Ninja Turtles Adventures comics, the first animated television series, and its toy line. The series is about four anthropomorphic turtle characters: Leonardo, Donatello, Michaelangelo, and Raphael who use East-Asian martial arts weaponry. With the support of their master Splinter and their friend April O'Neil, the four battle against the Shredder.

The story of Radical Rescue begins a year after the Shredder's defeat, with Leonardo, Raphael, and Donatello relaxing. As the three watch television, their show is interrupted by April O'Neil announcing a prison break. The newscast is cut off, leading the three to spring into action to save her. As Michelangelo begins to rescue the Turtles, they find that their Master Splinter has been captured and that the area is the main base of the Shredder (Note: In the English-language version of the game, the character is described in-game as Shredder. In the manual, he is described as being partially a cyborg, and called Cyber Shredder.). The turtles rescue Splinter, leading to the discovery that April was also kidnapped by Shredder. The Turtles ultimately defeat Shredder and rescue April, who says that now that Shredder is gone, the world will finally be at peace.

== Gameplay ==
Each character in the game has their own abilities to traverse the terrain. Michaelangelo uses his nunchaku to avoid spiked hazards.

Retrospectively, Radical Rescue has been referred to by publications including Retro Gamer, GamesTM and Nintendo World Report as a Metroidvania game, a portmanteau of two archetypal video games: Super Metroid (1994) and Castlevania: Symphony of the Night (1997). The term became more popular in the early 21st century, describing platformers where players unlock new abilities to traverse a maze-like level design. Contemporary video game reviews described the game variously as a platformer, a beat 'em up, an action game and an action-adventure game.

The game begins with the player taking control of the ninja turtle Michaelangelo. As the player rescues the other ninja turtles, they gain the ability to swap between them as playable characters. Each playable character can jump and attack enemies. Each ninja turtle has a different ability which is necessary to finish the game. Michaelangelo can hover in the air with his nunchaku, Leonardo can drill the ground with his katana, Raphael can shrink himself inside his shell to enter narrow passages, and Donatello has the ability to climb walls.

The game is set in a large open world where new areas become available from defeating boss characters. The game displays a life gauge that is reduced when an enemy successfully attacks a ninja turtle. Once the bar is depleted, the game ends. The player has an option to continue twice after this. Players can find items that affect their life gauge, including pizza slices to restore life or hearts to increase their maximum life. Other items include ID Cards and jail keys which unlock various paths. The player can also view a map of the world layout.

== Development and release ==
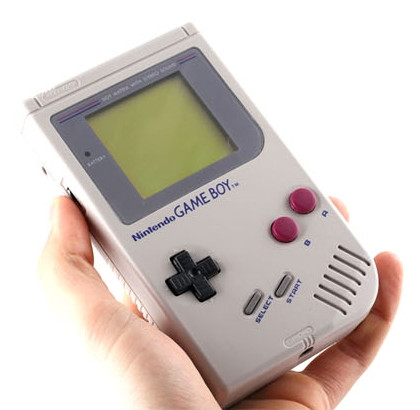
Teenage Mutant Ninja Turtles III: Radical Rescue was released for the Game Boy in 1993.

In the early 1990s, the Teenage Mutant Ninja Turtles franchise experienced a surge in popularity. By December 1990, images from the franchise had been licensed for an estimated 130 products. This included a TMNT action figure line and the Archie Comics series Teenage Mutant Ninja Turtles Adventures, which ran from 1988 to 1995. The Japanese company Konami would capitalize on this, releasing several video games based on the franchise.

Teenage Mutant Ninja Turtles III: Radical Rescue was Konami's final entry in their Game Boy trilogy, which also includes Fall of the Foot Clan (1990) and Back from the Sewers (1991). Radical Rescue featured the same core staff as the previous Game Boy games. Radical Rescue includes characters adapted from the Teenage Mutant Ninja Turtles Adventures comics and the line of action figures. The in-game character models are based on the style of the Mirage Studios Teenage Mutant Ninja Turtles comic artist Michael Dooney.

Teenage Mutant Ninja Turtles III: Radical Rescue was released for the Game Boy in Japan on November 26, 1993. The game was showcased at the 1994 Winter Consumer Electronic Show, where Nintendo Power editors named Radical Rescue one of the "Best of Show" titles for the Game Boy category. Contemporary American and British journalists have given conflicting release dates for the English-language version of the game, ranging between November 1993 and January 1994. The Ayrshire Post said that Radical Rescue was among the top five selling handheld video games from select shops in the United Kingdom in late December 1993.

Both the Japanese and English-language version of the game were included in the compilation Teenage Mutant Ninja Turtles: The Cowabunga Collection (2022). The Japanese version features minor gameplay differences, such as more detailed icons on the map screen.

== Reception ==
=== Contemporary ===
Reception

Review scores
Publication	Score
Computer and Video Games	90/100
Famicom Tsūshin	4/10, 4/10, 5/10, 5/10
GB Action	79%
Hippon Super!	6/10
Joypad	89%
Maniac	70%
Mega Fun	65%
Nintendo Magazine System	66%
Total!	78%
Video Games	65%

Upon release, Radical Rescue was described as one of the best Game Boy titles in Computer and Video Games and GamePro, Other publications such as Video Games, Total!, and GB Action were lukewarm. The reviewer from Computer and Video Games declared that the game "could soon be in the top five hand-held games of all time". A reviewer in GamePro wrote that "Game Boy carts don't get much better than this." Man!ac found the gameplay more engaging than previous TMNT video games. Total! found the game "highly playable" but "not going to change the (gaming) world as we know it." while GB Action concluded that it was "pleasant enough but dull in the "we've seen it all before" mould."

Joypad found the gameplay fresh for the series, while Game Players stated that "You've got to admire Konami for not dipping into the same old well every time — the Turtles were ready for a make-over, and players will be satisfied with the results." Other publications such as Man!ac, Mega Fun, Gēmu Bōi and Total! found the game lacking in surprise or innovative features. GB Action wrote that the game was "not outstandingly original" and "perhaps expecting a spark of originality from a Turtles game is wishful thinking" Two reviewers in Weekly Famitsu wrote that the gameplay met their expectations considering the limitations of the Game Boy hardware. Kenji Sato of Hippon Super! complimented the graphics and level design, but said he found the characters creepy. He questioned their popularity in America, conluding that in Japan they would "surely be feared, not loved."

The Nintendo Magazine System review said the game lacked the quality of the first Turtles title, with "little variety and practically zero originality.". A Mega Fun reviewer said that the level design lacked variety due to its simplicity. A number of publications examined the maze-like structure of the game, writing that it made the game overtly difficult.

Reviewers in Computer and Video Games and GamePro complimented the music. The Game Players critic wrote that the "music is better than a lot of Game Boy games, but still gets repetitive." Game Players and GamePro both found the sound effects lacking, with the latter saying it was limited to boring impact noises outside of boss fights. Reviews from GamePro, Joypad and GB Action complimented the game's graphics. GB Action reviewers said the backgrounds gave "some feel to the locations" without obscuring the gameplay. The publication complimented the animated sprites of the boss and turtle characters.

=== Retrospective reviews ===
A number of retrospective reviews commented on the game in terms of its difficulty, graphics, and overall quality when compared to other Game Boy or Metroidvania-styled games. A GamesTM journalist said the game overall quality suffered due to its "infuriatingly difficult" level of challenge. Audun Sorlie of Hardcore Gaming 101 said the large level structure made it too easy for a player to get lost. Zachary Miller of Nintendo World Report said the in-game world map was confusing and relatively worthless, but found its design as more compact and easier to navigate than the similar games Metroid (1986) and Metroid II: Return of Samus (1991). Miller said the graphics made the turtles indistinguishable from each other, while Sorlie found the game limited by the hardware of the Game Boy, due to a lack of color graphics.

Miller said that despite the flaws he found in the Radical Rescue, they were ignorable as the game was "packed with content." Sorlie concluded that the graphics, sound, and challenge have "held up great" and ultimately described it as the best in the TMNT video game series for either handheld or console and a "worthy addition to any Game Boy collection."

== Legacy ==
By the mid-1990s, the TMNT franchise experienced a decline in popularity, resulting in no new game releases for the rest of the decade. Following the 2003 release of the TMNT television series, Konami launched new games in the early 2000s, which Game Informer described as achieving "only a fraction of the success of the original titles from more than a decade ago." With the exception of Teenage Mutant Ninja Turtles: Danger of the Ooze (2014), other TMNT games did not adapt Radical Rescue's Metroidvania gameplay style.

In a Hardcore Gaming 101 retrospective, Jesper Sorlie described Radical Rescue as a milestone for Konami because it pioneered the Metroidvania genre that they would eventually realize with Castlevania: Symphony of the Night (1997). Writing in World Design for 2D Action-Adventures (2025), authors Christopher Totten and Adrian Sandoval described Radical Rescue as "an important step in the evolution of the Metroidvania" and defining the genre's gameloop: using a new ability to explore the environment, finding and defeating a boss, rescuing a character with a key, and repeating this sequence." Several staff members from Radical Rescue would later work on Castlevania: Symphony of the Night, including director Hiroyuki Fukui, who served as a producer on the latter title. Both games share a similar structure, beginning with a seemingly linear level design before shifting to non-linear, exploration-based gameplay.

== See also ==
- 1993 in video games
- List of Konami games
