= Teenage Mutant Ninja Turtles: Tournament Fighters =

1993 video game

- North American print ad for all three versions of the game. Each version of the game featured a different Turtle as the cover character facing off against an opponent from that particular version.
- Developer: Konami
- Publisher: Konami
- Composers: NES; Junichiro Kaneda; Ayako Nishigaki; Super NES; Kazuhiko Uehara; Hideto Inoue; Harumi Ueko; Genesis; Miki Higashino
- Series: Teenage Mutant Ninja Turtles
- Platforms: NES, Super NES, Sega Genesis
- Release: Super NES: JP: December 3, 1993; NA: December 1993; PAL: December 1993; Genesis: JP: December 3, 1993; NA: December 1993; PAL: January 1994; NES: NA: February 1994; PAL: 1994
- Genre: Fighting game
- Modes: Single-player, multiplayer

Teenage Mutant Ninja Turtles: Tournament Fighters, or Teenage Mutant Hero Turtles: Tournament Fighters in Europe, is the title of three different fighting games based on the Teenage Mutant Ninja Turtles, produced by Konami for the Nintendo Entertainment System, Sega Genesis, and Super NES and released during a period between 1993 and 1994. Konami produced a different fighting game based on the franchise each featuring a differing cast of characters for the platforms. All three versions of the game were re-released as part of Teenage Mutant Ninja Turtles: The Cowabunga Collection in 2022, with online play using rollback netcode for the Super NES version of the game.

== NES version ==
NES screenshot (Hothead Vs. Hothead)

The NES version of Tournament Fighters was the final game Konami released for the platform in North America and the PAL region in 1994. It was also the fifth TMNT game released for Nintendo home consoles. Unlike the other versions of Tournament Fighters, it was not released in Japan. Tournament Fighters was one of the few fighting games released for the NES during the fighting game boom.

The game's single-player Story mode has the player taking control of one of the four Turtles (Leonardo, Raphael, Michaelangelo, and Donatello), as they hold a contest amongst themselves to see who is fit to take on Shredder's challenge. After defeating the first three opponents, the player proceeds to fight Casey Jones and then Hothead (a character based on the Warrior Dragon from the Teenage Mutant Ninja Turtles Adventures comics and the action figure of the same name) before the final match with the Shredder. In addition to the Story mode, the game also has two Versus modes (one against the CPU and another against a second player), as well as a four-player tournament mode. An option mode where the player can adjust the game's difficulty, continues, and speed is also available.

The gameplay follows many of the standard fighting game conventions. Battles consist of three-round matches and the first player to win two rounds is the victor. Each character has their own repertoire of basic punch and kick techniques, as well as command-based special moves. During battle, a flying monitor with Splinter's face will sometimes appear that will drop a red ball power-up at the middle of the stage that can be retrieved by either fighter. Whoever retrieves the ball power-up will be able to use it by inputting the appropriate command.

The NES version allows the player to match any character against a clone of himself, with the exception of Hothead. The game does not allow such a match under normal circumstances, but there is a way to bypass this restriction in the game's "Vs. CPU" mode. The second Hothead will be colored differently, as with all same character matches in the game, but the game will also flicker due to the large size of both characters.

In Teenage Mutant Ninja Turtles: The Cowabunga Collection, the NES version of Teenage Mutant Ninja Turtles: Tournament Fighters has no slowdown or sprite flicker, and allows both players to play as Hothead in Tournament and Versus mode.

== Super NES version ==
Super NES screenshot (Leonardo vs. Aska)

A tournament has been organized and many fighters have entered, Shredder being one of them. The Turtles decide to participate in order to stop their nemesis as well as proving their strength in the tournament.

This game's controls use a four-button scheme (two punches and two kicks, weak and strong). A particular feature is the possibility to use a super special attack. In order to achieve this, the player must fill a green bar under the life bar, by hitting their opponents. Once full, the player must press the two strong attack buttons simultaneously. There is also the option of enhancing the speed of the game, making the fights more intense but also more difficult to follow.

In addition to the main and versus modes, there is a story mode in which the Turtles must rescue April O'Neil and Splinter from Karai's clutches. The Turtles must travel across the US in their Turtle Blimp, defeating other fighters and collecting information. Only the four of them can be playable whereas the other characters are the opponents, including clone versions of the Turtles. There is no Mutagen Meter in story mode. There is also a watch mode, which features computer-controlled characters.

There are ten characters available, plus two bosses. Aside from the Turtles and Shredder (known as Cyber Shredder in this game), these characters are also available:

- War – A monstrous purple creature with big claws, one of the Four Horsemen of the Apocalypse from the Teenage Mutant Ninja Turtles Adventures comics published by Archie. The game version of the character is said to be an alien in the game's Tournament mode as well as a mutant by the Turtles in the game's story mode.
- Aska – A ninja girl seeking to open her own dojo. Aska is an original character created by Takemasa Miyoshi for the game. She is inspired by Mitsu from the film, Teenage Mutant Ninja Turtles III, and was originally intended to be Mitsu, but her character was renamed after the film's poor reception.
- Wingnut – A humanoid bat-like alien who appeared in several issues of the Archie Comics series, as well as in an episode of the animated series.
- Chrome Dome – An android from the animated series, he was initially created by Shredder to destroy the Turtles.
- Armaggon – A mutant shark from the future. Also from the Archie Comics series.

The bosses are:

- Rat King – A deranged man who cast away his humanity and considers himself a rat, even though he has not been mutated.
- Karai – The leader of the Foot Clan in Japan. She had only appeared in the original comics by Mirage Studios at the time of the game's release.

=== Regional differences ===
The Super NES version of Tournament Fighters was later released in Japan under the title Teenage Mutant Ninja Turtles: Mutant Warriors. This version contains some slight differences: Aska's outfit is more revealing and she has a different victory animation in which her breasts bounce. The turtles also sound more like teenagers, and their character icons are different.

In Teenage Mutant Ninja Turtles: The Cowabunga Collection, the Super NES version of Teenage Mutant Ninja Turtles: Tournament Fighters has six enhancements, each having been featured in the original release as Button Codes.

- Playable bosses – Allows the player to play as Rat King and Karai in Versus Mode.
- Extra versus stages – Allows two additional stages to be accessible in Versus mode.
- Maximum speed – Grants the player access to the hi-speed 3 feature in the in-game options menu.
- Extra lives – Allows the player to select up to 10 credits for Story Mode in the in-game options menu.
- Ultimate Attacks in Story Mode – Allows Ultimate Attacks in Story Mode.
- Group Mode − Enables the hidden Group Mode (Japanese version only).

== Genesis version ==
Genesis screenshot (Donatello vs. April)

The Genesis/Mega Drive version of Tournament Fighters was released in North America, the PAL region, and Japan around the same time as its Super NES counterpart.

The Genesis version uses the standard three-button controller, with only two buttons for attacking (punch and kick). To perform stronger punches or kicks, the player must hold the directional pad towards the opponent while pressing either attack buttons. The third button is used for taunting. Some of the stages in the game feature destroyable scenery that gives the player and their opponent access to new areas in the stage. As well as their special moves, each character has a 'killer' attack which is only accessible when they are close to death and the red part of the characters' life gauge at the top starts flashing. This is done by pressing the Taunt button in conjunction with a specific D-Pad motion. These moves nearly take out the other character's life gauge completely.

The game has eight playable characters, which includes the four Turtles and:

- Casey Jones
- April O'Neil (whose active role differs from the versions of the character featured in other games)
- Ray Fillet (a character from the Teenage Mutant Ninja Turtles Adventures comics)
- Sisyphus (an original character, named Musha Beetle in the Japanese version).

The player can adjust their power and speed after selecting their character. The music in this version was composed by renowned video game composer Miki Higashino, in collaboration with Masanori Adachi.

The main single-player mode features the turtles and their allies traveling to various planets in Dimension X, fighting against clones of themselves, as they seek to rescue Splinter from Krang. After defeating the eight clones, the player travels to the final three stages to fight against a Triceraton, Krang's Android, and Karai (in that order). The game has a two-player mode, as well as a practice mode in which the player faces the computer in a 1-round match, and a "Tournament" mode where the player must defeat 88 opponents with one life gauge.

In Teenage Mutant Ninja Turtles: The Cowabunga Collection, the Genesis version of Teenage Mutant Ninja Turtles: Tournament Fighters has the sole enhancement of playable bosses, allowing the player to play as the Triceraton, Krang and his Android, and Karai in any game mode, increasing the number of playable characters from 8 to 11.

Each of the 3 boss characters is represented by a silhouetted character icon located above the original 8 playable characters. Each boss character's silhouetted icon is outlined in a different color, and below each icon is their respective character's name. Choosing one of the three allows to play as that character.

== Reception ==
Reception

Review scores
Publication	Score
Electronic Gaming Monthly	9/10, 8/10, 9/10, 9/10 (SNES); 7/10, 7/10, 7/10, 7/10, 6/10 (NES)
Famitsu	7/10, 7/10, 6/10, 6/10 (SFC) 6/10, 6/10, 6/10, 6/10 (GEN)
GameFan	96%, 85%, 92%, 96% (SNES); 65%, 64%, 49%, 70% (GEN)
Electronic Games	79% (SNES)
Mega	57% (GEN)
SNES Force	90% (SNES)

In the United Kingdom, it was the top-selling Super NES game in January 1994.

For the version released for the Super Nintendo, Electronic Gaming Monthly called the game "a real surprise" noting high quality audio and overall appeal. One reviewer in the magazine called it "the perfect blend of elements from Street Fighter II and Mortal Kombat while another declared that in some ways it was even better than Street Fighter II." Reviewers in Famitsu complimented the relatively easy to learn and responsive controls. While on reviewer said they were unfamiliar with the characters who were not the Ninja Turtles, they still found them fun while another reviewer said players who were not fans of the series may not find the game as fun as fans. Another user said while fun, the game was nearly a remake of Street Fighter II.

In 1993, Aska was rated as #4 on the list of "Top Ten Fighting Women" by Electronic Gaming Monthly. In the same issue Electronic Gaming Monthly gave the Sega Genesis version average reviews, noting that the game is not a good as the Super NES version and stating that "There aren't many moves and the fighters are unappealing. The game also has a darker look and feel." Mega magazine gave the Sega Genesis an average review score, criticizing the game's sluggish gameplay and unresponsive controls, stating that "It's an uninspired beat-em-up that's borrowed everything from Street Fighter 2 but the gameplay." GamePro magazine gave the Super NES version ratings (out of 5) of 4.5 for graphics, 4.5 for sound, 5.0 for control, and 5.0 for fun factor.

In 1995, Total! ranked the game 61st on its Top 100 Super NES Games, summarizing: "This is a shockingly good beat-'em-up considering it's a license."
