= Teenage Mutant Ninja Turtles: Manhattan Missions =

1991 video game

- Developer: Distinctive Software
- Publisher: Konami
- Producer: Rory Armes
- Designers: List: Eric Freytag; Shawn Rogers; Rory Armes; Laura Luris; Stanley Chow; Anthony Gurr; Dave Warfield
- Programmers: Eric Freytag; Shawn Rogers
- Composer: Michael J. Sokyrka
- Series: Teenage Mutant Ninja Turtles
- Platform: MS-DOS
- Release: NA: June 1, 1991
- Genre: Beat 'em up
- Modes: Single-player, multiplayer

Teenage Mutant Ninja Turtles: Manhattan Missions a beat 'em up video game developed by Distinctive Software for MS-DOS featuring the Teenage Mutant Ninja Turtles. it was published in 1992 by Konami.

== Gameplay ==
Screenshot of the game's two-player mode. Here, Donatello and Michaelangelo take on Mousers in the Manhattan sewers.

The goal of the game is to complete a number of missions, consisting of levels divided into screens, culminating in a final battle with The Shredder. The gameplay is similar to the original Prince of Persia, as characters switch between free movement and melee fighting stances in a two-dimensional platformer environment. In between missions the Turtles can rest, regaining lost hit points, but the player only has a limited amount of time in which to find the Shredder. The game is designed to be played with a keyboard, and utilizes a key to switch between walking and fighting modes. Each Turtle has the ability to arm and withdraw his weapon. Each Turtle wields his signature weapon and a number of shuriken. Holding the enter key makes the Turtles attack, and the spacebar is used to block enemy attacks based on which arrow key is held.

== Tone and setting ==
TMNT: Manhattan Missions title screen, based closely on artwork from the original TMNT comic book

Manhattan Missions is notable for its more mature tone and setting than other TMNT games of its time. The game greatly draws upon the original Mirage comics and theatrical films, unlike other contemporary TMNT games which were mostly based on the 1987 TV series. The opening story is loosely based on the story from the original Teenage Mutant Ninja Turtles #1. Indeed, the game's title screen is almost an exact reproduction of the splash page from the second and third pages of TMNT #1.

Other elements from the Mirage comics and films include the Shredder and Foot Clan character designs, the presence of Triceratons, and the inclusion of Tatsu, a character created for the films. The only direct relation to the 1987 series is the turtles having multi-colored bandanas, the inclusion of Bebop and Rocksteady as bosses, and Baxter Stockman being Caucasian.

April O'Neil is a reporter like her 1987 cartoon and movie appearances; while she dressed in yellow like the cartoon, she resembled actress Paige Turco from the second film. Splinter resembles his movie design. The Turtles' rescue of April from a group of Foot Ninja is similar to a scene from the first movie.

Also, notably, Casey Jones is a major character in the game, as he is in the Mirage comics and films. This is the first TMNT game where he plays a major part, as he rescues the player's Turtle if he runs out of energy.
