= Teenage Mutant Ninja Turtles: The Cowabunga Collection =

2022 video game compilation

- Developer: Digital Eclipse
- Publisher: Konami
- Series: Teenage Mutant Ninja Turtles
- Platforms: Nintendo Switch; PlayStation 4; PlayStation 5; Windows; Xbox One; Xbox Series X/S
- Release: August 30, 2022
- Genre: Various
- Modes: Single-player, multiplayer

Teenage Mutant Ninja Turtles: The Cowabunga Collection is a 2022 video game compilation developed by Digital Eclipse and published by Konami. It features 13 Teenage Mutant Ninja Turtles video games developed by Konami between 1989 and 1994. The compilation includes the Western and Japanese versions of most titles, and adds online capabilities in certain games.

The Cowabunga Collection was released for Nintendo Switch, PlayStation 4, PlayStation 5, Windows, Xbox One, and Xbox Series X/S on August 30, 2022.

== Content ==
The Cowabunga Collection adds save states, rewind functions, button mapping, as well as online capabilities in certain games and local co-op in all games where it was originally intended. It features an in-game museum that offers previously unseen development art, sketches and game design material for the titles. All games can be played in English or Japanese, excluding the arcade version of Turtles in Time and the NES version of Tournament Fighters, which were never released in Japan.

The Cowabunga Collection compiles 13 Teenage Mutant Ninja Turtles games developed by Konami between 1989 and 1994, listed below.

Titles included in Teenage Mutant Ninja Turtles: The Cowabunga Collection
Title	Original system	Released (NA)	Local players	Online multiplayer
Teenage Mutant Ninja Turtles (NES video game)	NES	1989	Single-player	No
Teenage Mutant Ninja Turtles (arcade game) (Note: The version used is based on the Arcade1Up countercade release.)	Arcade	1989	Multiplayer	Yes
Teenage Mutant Ninja Turtles II: The Arcade Game	NES	1990	Multiplayer	No
Teenage Mutant Ninja Turtles: Fall of the Foot Clan	Game Boy	1990	Single-player	No
Teenage Mutant Ninja Turtles: Turtles in Time	Arcade	1991	Multiplayer	Yes
Teenage Mutant Ninja Turtles II: Back from the Sewers	Game Boy	1991	Single-player	No
Teenage Mutant Ninja Turtles III: The Manhattan Project	NES	1992	Multiplayer	Yes
Teenage Mutant Ninja Turtles IV: Turtles in Time	Super NES	1992	Multiplayer	Yes
Teenage Mutant Ninja Turtles: The Hyperstone Heist	Sega Genesis	1992	Multiplayer	Yes
Teenage Mutant Ninja Turtles III: Radical Rescue	Game Boy	1993	Single-player	No
Teenage Mutant Ninja Turtles: Tournament Fighters (Super NES version)	Super NES	1993	Multiplayer	Yes
Teenage Mutant Ninja Turtles: Tournament Fighters (Genesis version)	Sega Genesis	1993	Multiplayer	No
Teenage Mutant Ninja Turtles: Tournament Fighters (NES version)	NES	1994	Multiplayer	No

== Development ==
The compilation was developed by Digital Eclipse, who had previously worked on other retro collections, such as The Disney Afternoon Collection and Street Fighter 30th Anniversary Collection. The Cowabunga Collection was announced as part of the PlayStation State of Play event on March 9, 2022. Charles Murakami, the senior producer at Konami, pitched a collection of Teenage Mutant Ninja Turtle themed game collection that would include other promotional material related to the comic series and the animated television series. Digital Eclipse developed the project and worked with Rich Whitehouse who was the ROM engineer on the project and was able to reverse-engineer the games. Material related to the game was collected from a week's worth of research at The Strong. Konami went through their archive in Japan and found about 2,000 pages of design documents and promotional art which were scanned and translated or captioned to be included as bonus material in the release.

== Release and reception ==
Reception

Aggregate score
Aggregator	Score
Metacritic	(NS) 83/100 (PC) 78/100 (PS5) 79/100 (XSXS) 81/100

Review scores
Publication	Score
Destructoid	8/10
Hardcore Gamer	4/5
IGN	7/10
Nintendo Life	9/10
Nintendo World Report	9/10
NME	3/5
Push Square	8/10
Retro Gamer	85%
Shacknews	9/10
The Guardian	4/5
TouchArcade	5/5
Video Games Chronicle	4/5

Teenage Mutant Ninja Turtles: The Cowabunga Collection was featured at San Diego Comic-Con 2022. It was released for the Nintendo Switch, PlayStation 4, PlayStation 5, Windows, Xbox One and Xbox Series X/S on August 30, 2022. A limited edition physical version of the game was also released, containing a cloth poster, an acrylic diorama, an enamel pin set, 12 Tournament Fighters cards, and a 180-page artbook. The box art and cloth poster were designed by Teenage Mutant Ninja Turtles co-creator Kevin Eastman. The game was delisted on Steam in Japan in March 2024, making it only available for people who have purchased the game prior to delisting.

Teenage Mutant Ninja Turtles: The Cowabunga Collection received "generally favorable" reviews, according to the review aggregator Metacritic. By April 7, 2023, the release had sold over 1 million copies.

Retro Gamer magazine complimented the bonus features and quality of life features such as the ability to rewind some games and remove flickering on others, and the high quality emulation that had a "tiny bit of input lag in some games, but nothing that hampered play".
