= Teenage Mutant Ninja Turtles: Fall of the Foot Clan =

1990 video game

- North American cover art
- Developer: Konami
- Publishers: WW: Konami; NA: Ultra Games
- Director: Naoki Matsui
- Designer: Naoki Matsui
- Programmer: Hiroyuki Fukui
- Artists: Naoki Matsui; Hiroshi Makitani; Kazutomo Terada
- Composer: Michiru Yamane
- Series: Teenage Mutant Ninja Turtles
- Platform: Game Boy
- Release: NA: August 1990; JP: August 3, 1990; EU: 1991
- Genres: Action, platform
- Mode: Single player

Teenage Mutant Ninja Turtles: Fall of the Foot Clan (Note: ティーンエージ ミュータント ニンジャ タートルズ (Tīnēji Myūtanto Ninja Tātoruzu) Released as Teenage Mutant Hero Turtles: Fall of the Foot Clan in Europe.) is a 1990 action-platform game developed and published by Konami for the Game Boy. The game is based on the 1987 Teenage Mutant Ninja Turtles television series. The Turtles' first Game Boy game is a platforming-style game, where Leonardo, Michelangelo, Donatello, and Raphael must battle against Krang and Shredder and save their friend April O'Neil in the process. The game was re-released as part of Teenage Mutant Ninja Turtles: The Cowabunga Collection in 2022.

== Gameplay ==
The player takes control of one of the Turtles through a total of five stages, battling Krang and Shredder's minions along the way. Enemies include Foot Soldiers, Mousers and Roadkill Rodney among others. If a Turtle runs out of health, he is captured and the player must select another Turtle to pick up where he left off. If all four Turtles are captured, the game is over. One can regain lost health by collecting pizza or by winning the hidden mini-games scattered throughout each stage. There are a total of five stages, each with a unique end-boss: Rocksteady, Bebop, Baxter Stockman, Shredder, and Krang. The player can choose which stage to start the game on, but the game needs to be completed from Stage 1 to see the full ending.

== Sequels ==
The game was followed by two sequels: Teenage Mutant Ninja Turtles II: Back from the Sewers in 1991, and Teenage Mutant Ninja Turtles III: Radical Rescue in 1993.

== Reception ==
Reception

Review scores
| Publication | Score |
|---|---|
| Electronic Gaming Monthly | 8/10, 8/10, 8/10, 9/10 |
| Famitsu | 5/10, 7/10, 8/10, 5/10 |

Teenage Mutant Ninja Turtles was released in Japan for the Game Boy on August 3, 1990.

The game sold nearly 900,000 units, grossing $27 million in retail sales revenue.

In August 2008, Teenage Mutant Ninja Turtles: Fall of the Foot Clan ranked 15th place on Nintendo Power's list of the Top 20 Game Boy games of all-time.
