= Foot Clan =

Fictional ninja clan in the TMNT franchise

- Logo of the Foot Clan

Publication information
- Publisher: Mirage Studios
- First appearance: Teenage Mutant Ninja Turtles #1 (May 1984)
- Created by: Kevin Eastman; Peter Laird

In-story information
- Type of organisation: Drug smuggling Arms running Assassination
- Base(s): Japan; New York City; Technodrome
- Leader(s): Shredder; Karai
- Agent(s): Notable current members: Shredder; Karai; Baxter Stockman; Bebop and Rocksteady; Tokka and Rahzar

The Foot Clan (also known simply as the Foot) is a fictional ninja clan in the Teenage Mutant Ninja Turtles franchise, serving as the main antagonists. It is led by the devious Shredder and his second in command Karai. The Foot Clan was a parody of the criminal ninja clan The Hand in the Daredevil comics published by Marvel Comics. In addition to the obvious similarity in their names, both clans originate from Feudal Japan, practise ninjutsu and black magic, and have become powerful global organized crime rings who are familiar with multiple illegal activities such as drug smuggling, counterfeiting of money, gunrunning, murder, assassination, computer hacking, theft, and terrorism.

== Eastman and Laird's Teenage Mutant Ninja Turtles ==
In the original Teenage Mutant Ninja Turtles series by Kevin Eastman and Peter Laird, the Foot Clan was founded in Feudal Japan by two men named Sato and Oshi. In issue #47, the Turtles and Renet traveled to a time prior to the Foot's creation, with Raphael inadvertently teaching Sato and Oshi about Ninjutsu without knowing their identities.

The Foot Clan are the most feared clan of warriors and assassins in Japan. Both Hamato Yoshi and Oroku Nagi were members until Nagi attacked Yoshi's love Tang Shen and Yoshi killed Nagi. Dishonored, Yoshi and Shen fled to New York City, while Nagi's younger brother Oroku Saki was adopted by the clan and trained to become a ninja. When he was ready, Saki was sent to America to head the New York branch of the Clan. Karai, a clan leader from Japan, enlists the Turtles to stop the clan war and enact a peace treaty.

== 1987 series and TMNT Adventures ==
The 1987 series and the spin-off TMNT Adventures comics share a similar continuity, and thus the same version of the Foot Clan. The Foot is an ancient ninjutsu clan, founded in Japan in 1583. Shredder, followed by the Turtles and Splinter, went back and forth in time to try to kill the creator of the Foot Clan. In 1583, Shredder's ancestor Oroku Sancho led a small group of samurai, and Shredder offered to help him find magical artifacts that would give him power and wealth beyond his wildest dreams. Meanwhile, Splinter's ancestor Hamato Koji had been sent to find the same artifacts and did find them with the help of his descendant and the Turtles. One of the artifacts released a dragon, which headed for nearby villages; Splinter and Koji went to stop it while the Turtles went to fight Shredder. Sancho's men captured the Turtles and were about to execute them when Koji arrived, riding the dragon, which he had tamed. Seeing this, Sancho fled in fear, and Koji offered to lead Sancho's men and teach them the ninjutsu art of Shibana-Sama, founding the Foot Clan, so named for the footprint of the dragon in which he stood as he made his speech.

In 1960s Japan, both Oroku Saki and Hamato Yoshi were part of the Clan. Saki framed Yoshi for trying to murder a visiting sensei and had him exiled to New York City, thus clearing the way to take over the Foot Clan. He then proceeded to turn the Foot Clan into an army of criminals. Over the years, Saki, who became known as Shredder, moved to the US, allied with the alien warlord Krang, and replaced the human Foot Ninja with robotic Foot Soldiers.

The Foot Clan's logo is a drawing of a right foot, and the Foot Soldiers wear purple and black uniforms featuring the logo on their foreheads. The Foot logo can also be seen on the Technodrome.

== IDW Publishing ==
In the IDW Publishing adaption, the Foot Clan existed since the time of feudal Japan and was founded by ronin Takeshi Tatsuo who had been betrayed by his master. The sorceress Kitsune helped Tatsuo recover from the severe wounds he had suffered in the assassination attempt. The name of the clan was created by the bloody footprint of Tatsuo, whose leg was completely healed by Kitsune.

When Tatsuo was betrayed by his clan are learning that he made a pact with a magician, his mind was born again in the son of his murderer Oroku Saki, the uprooting of the reawakening of his old memories powered over the communities and with Kitsune's counsel the Foot was revived in modern times.

In more recent times, the clan under the leadership of Oroku Saki (who was now operating as Shredder) tried to expand its supremacy in New York City. Its Foot Ninja were therefore often sent to amass any science that could help the Foot and also to find new test subjects. In this way, it led to the creation of the mutant arctic fox Alopex.

In this endeavor, the Foot Clan also came into contact with the extradimensional warlord Krang, who also wanted to create a mutant army to meet his objectives. An attack by the Foot Clan in the laboratory of Krang's ally Baxter Stockman led by a combination of circumstances to the creation of the Turtles and their father Splinter (who in a previous life had himself belonged to the Foot Clan).

Besides Shredder, Kitsune, and a substantial number of Foot Ninjas, other members of the Foot Clan include Karai (who was a descendant of Oroku Saki and the daughter of Oroku Yori), Masato, Dr. Miller, Alopex (a mutated Arctic Fox), Rocksteady, Bebop, Koya (Shredder's pet brown falcon who was later mutated), and Bludgeon (a mutant hammerhead shark).

== Film ==
=== 1990–2007 ===
The Foot Clan's oni symbol in the 1990 film.

In the first and second movies, the Foot Clan is a group of ninja thieves founded by Shredder in Japan, but later stationed in New York. Shredder had taken what Foot Soldiers he had from Japan, and began taking children from the streets upon moving to New York and training them in Ninjutsu himself. His second-in-command is another Ninjutsu master called Tatsu. In the films, the Foot use the kanji Oni (鬼), which translates to "demon" or "ogre", as their symbol, worn in their hachimaki or on their backs.

In the second film, Tatsu tried to take command. He relinquished his claim when Shredder returned. The clan then kidnapped Professor Jordon Perry of TGRI and forced him to use a mutagen so the Foot Clan could create two mutant warriors to fight the turtles. This results in an alligator snapping turtle and a gray wolf taken from the zoo being mutated into Tokka and Rahzar.

In the fourth film, the Foot is now under leadership of Karai, who has taken control after Shredder's death. They have grown in numbers and skill, and offer their services as mercenaries in the film. They are hired by Max Winters to track down and bring in the 13 monsters arriving in New York City.

=== 2014 film ===
In the 2014 live-action film (which is a reboot of the Teenage Mutant Ninja Turtles film series), the Foot Clan are no longer considered an international ninja cult, but rather a modern American terrorist organization. Besides Shredder and Karai, the film also introduced Eric Sacks who is Shredder's student, Dr. O'Neil's former lab partner, and the CEO of Sacks Industries. Instead of black unitard-clad masked ninjitsu warriors, they are portrayed as fully armed men who wear black military-like uniforms and kabuki-style masks to conceal one's identity.

In Teenage Mutant Ninja Turtles: Out of the Shadows, the Foot Ninjas make their appearance, under leadership of Baxter Stockman to free Shredder. After Krang met with Shredder and told him about the device that would bring the Technodrome to Earth, Shredder and Karai recruited escaped prisoners Rocksteady and Bebop to aid them in obtaining the pieces.

== Ninja Turtles: The Next Mutation ==
In the 1997-1998 Ninja Turtles: The Next Mutation series, the Foot Clan is a street gang, similar to the films. After Venus defeated Shredder, Leonardo told the kids that the Foot is a lie, and the clan was disbanded.

== 2003 series ==
The Foot Clan logo as seen in the 2003 animated series.

In the 2003 series, the Foot Clan is more similar to its original comic version. The Foot Clan are a group of warriors and assassins founded by Shredder one thousand years prior in Japan. Shredder, who in this series is a long-lived Utrom named Ch'rell, has led the Clan since its creation and has turned it into a fearsome and secret group present across the world. The Foot emblem is a red, trident-like dragon's footprint (hence the name of the clan), an inverted version of the "Three-Toed Sign of the Dragon", the symbol of the five warriors who had defeated the demonic Shredder in 300 AD. Thanks to Shredder's knowledge of Utrom technology, the Clan has weapons and equipment centuries ahead of human technology.

== 2012 series ==
In the 2012 series, the Foot Clan's origins are expanded on in the second season of the series. The clan was founded in Japan by a master martial artist named Koga Takuza, who used the swords of his fallen foes to forge a helmet stronger than steel, dubbing it the Kuro Kabuto. The Kabuto helmet is a symbol of the leader of the Foot Clan, passed down to the various rulers in the Foot's history. The Foot Clan would end up in a lengthy war against the Hamato Clan, which reached a boiling point when Oroku Saki was raised alongside Hamato Yoshi. Though the two were raised as brothers, Saki discovered his true heritage as being an orphaned Foot Clan member, and when his love Tang Shen wed Yoshi, he inadvertently killed Shen leaving Yoshi to supposedly die while saving his infant daughter Hamato Miwa. In this series, the Foot Clan is a global ninjutsu clan and crime syndicate answering only to Shredder, though others run the various factions of the Foot Clan across the globe.

The basic Foot Soldiers are silent ninjas with black robes and red bug-like eyes who are equipped with various weapons such as swords, shurikens, spears, nunchucks and tonfas. Eventually after an alliance with the Kraang, these warriors are replaced by robotic duplicates called "Foot-Bots", who have more advanced combat and have the ability to learn and predict the Turtles' moves, they also have the ability to grow extra limbs and can morph their hands into deadly weapons like curved blades, buzzsaws, maces and drills. Another variation of these machines are the Elite Foot-Bots, who are based on Chrome Dome and are built with plasma weapons. After Shredder had fled New York, Karai wants to regain the Foot Clan's honor with the help of her friend Shinigami and recruit more students, who all wear robes resembling the Hamato Clan.

== 2018 series ==
In Rise of the Teenage Mutant Ninja Turtles, the Foot Clan were initially peaceful and lived in feudal Japan, but came under attack and were nearly wiped out, their leader Oroku Saki sought help from an Oni who provided him with a mystic armor that allowed him to defeat their attackers, but the armor corrupted Saki and turned him to Shredder who led the Foot down to an evil path. Its known members in the present are the Foot Lieutenant and the Foot Brute. They can make origami ninjas out of paper and have the power of teleportation through hidden gateways. They seek to revive their master and are collecting the pieces of his armor in the shape of ancient artifacts.

== Batman vs. Teenage Mutant Ninja Turtles ==
The Foot Clan appear in the film Batman vs. Teenage Mutant Ninja Turtles (which is based on the IDW crossover). Sato and Oshi are mentioned as founders of the Foot Clan. The Foot Clan collaborated with the League of Assassins in a plot that involved using a stolen Wayne Enterprises cloud seeder to spread a compound containing a mixture of mutagen and Joker venom on Gotham City.

== Video games ==
- Teenage Mutant Ninja Turtles: The Manhattan Missions uses Foot Soldiers from the Mirage Comics though they dress in black like in the films.
- Video games, based on the 2003 animated series, have Foot Soldiers which appear as they do in the new series.
- The fighting games TMNT: Mutant Melee and TMNT: Smash Up have Foot Ninja as playable characters.
- In Teenage Mutant Ninja Turtles: Shredder's Revenge, the Foot Clan is steadily rebuilt by Shredder after their alleged destruction in Turtles in Time.

== Members ==
- Shredder - The leader of the Foot Clan and the arch-villain of the Ninja Turtles in most versions his real name is Oroku Saki a villainous ninjitsu master and often have a personal connection to Hamato Yoshi and Splinter in the Turtles origins and their most recurring foe in the franchise.
- Karai - A female high-ranking member of the Foot; someone on equal level of authority with Shredder. In later versions, she would become his right-hand and often his relative who usually has a rivalry with Leonardo.
- Bebop and Rocksteady - A mutant warthog and rhinoceros who usually serve Shredder.
- Tokka and Rahzar - A mutant alligator snapping turtle and wolf who are usually employed to Shredder in most versions.
- Baxter Stockman - A mad scientist who sometimes works for Shredder in some versions.
- Tatsu - Shredder's right-hand man in the live action movies.
- Purple Dragons - A street gang led by Hun who are affiliated with the Foot in a few versions.
  - Hun - The leader of the Purple Dragons who sometimes works for Shredder in some versions and is the arch-enemy of Casey Jones.
- Hamato Yoshi - A former member of the Foot Clan in most versions.
- Shredder Clones - Clones of Shredder whose origins vary in different media appearances.
  - Claw Shredder - A clone of Shredder with crustacean-like claws.
  - Mini Shredder - A miniature clone of Shredder.
  - Shiva Shredder - A large four-armed clone of Shredder.
- Foot Ninja - The Foot Ninja serves as the basic soldiers for the Foot.
- Foot Elite - The elite Foot Ninjas trained by Shredder.
- Foot Mystics - The Foot Mystics first appeared in the 2003 series. A different version appeared in the comics.
- Foot Bots - Foot Bots are robotic soldiers for the Foot.

=== Mirage era members ===
- Cha Ocho - A member of the Foot Clan.
- Hiroshi - A Foot med-tech.
- Izumi -
- Lin - A female member of the Foot Clan.
- Mamoru - A Foot Mystic.
- Mashima - A Foot Mystic.
- Oroku Nagi - The older brother of Shredder.
- Oshi -
- Pimiko - The daughter of Shredder.
- Sato -
- Sid Jones - The cousin of Casey Jones.
- Tomai -
- Yanada -
- The Mistress - Tang Shen's sister and Shredder's former concubine.

=== 1987 members ===
- Bebop and Rocksteady's gang - A group of punks who worked for Shredder alongside Rocksteady and Bebop. They appeared in the pilot episodes of the series and were later mutated by Shredder.
  - Scrag - A mutant bat with a black leatherjacket.
  - Grunt - A mutant lizard with a yellow mohawk.
  - Dopey - A mutant shrew with a cap.
  - Dumbo - A mutant dog, and shortest member.

=== 1990s film members ===
- Danny Pennington - Charles Pennington's teenage son who joined the Foot Clan. He later defected to the Turtles' side during the final battle.
- Freddy - A Foot Clan member who poses as April O'Neil's camera operator.

=== 2003 members ===
- Khan (voiced by Sean Schemmel) - A Foot Clan member who worked for Cyber-Shredder.
- Dr. Chaplin (voiced by Zachary Mastoon) - A young scientist who worked for the Foot Clan and was a fan of Baxter Stockman. He develops a crush on Karai. After the conclusion of the Ninja Tribunal story arc, they enter a relationship.
- Yin and Yang - Karai's male attendants.
- Yukio Mashimi - A former childhood friend of Hamato Yoshi who became a member of the Foot due to a leading conflict for the love of Tang Shen within the series.

=== IDW members ===
- Amai - Daughter of Karai, and also known as Lady Shredder.
- Bludgeon - A mutant hammerhead shark.
- Kitsune - A member of the Pantheon and the youngest of the group who assisted Shredder in the founding the Foot Clan. She seeks to revive her father and untie the pantheon which would wipe out humanity in the process and wanted Shredder to be his host. Despite this, Kitsune and Shredder were lovers and sincerely felt affection towards one another.
- Jennika - A young Foot assassin who is later turned into a mutant turtle and joins the Turtles as their fifth member.
- Toshiro - An elderly mentor of the Foot Clan who is often consulted by Karai for his wisdom and serenity.
- Koya - Shredder's pet brown falcon. She was later mutated into a humanoid form.
- Masato - A former leader of the Foot Clan and the sensei of Hamato Yoshi.
- Natsu - Natsu is young woman who was a part of the Yakuza, but now serves Karai.
- Ocho - Ocho is a Yokai mole transformed by Kitsune who was guarding a sword until Karai retrieves it and thus becoming her servant.
- Oroku Hiroto - Grandson of Oroku Saki and son of Karai who will become the new Shredder.
- Oroku Maji - The father of Oroku Saki.
- Patrick Miller - A professor and expert on the Foot Clan. He was later killed by a Foot assassin sent by Karai.
- Sarsparilla - A mutant armadillo seen in the possible future of 2032 during the Foot Clan's war with the Splinter Clan.
- Takeshi Tatsuo - The founder of the Foot Clan and past life of Shredder.

=== 2012 series members ===
- Koga Takuzu - The founder of the Foot Clan who forged the Kuro Kabuto helmet made from the armor pieces that he claimed from his defeated opponents.
- Oroku Keiji - The father of Oroku Saki. He was killed by Hamato Yuta.
- Chris Bradford (voiced by Clancy Brown) - An American celebrity martial arts master and action star. Unknown to the broad public, he is one of Shredder's disciples. Bradford is mutated twice in the series: in the first instance, Bradford was mutated into a mutant akita named Dogpound after being bitten by Shredder's pet akita Hachiko and exposed to mutagen. In the second instance, he became a mutant wolf dubbed Rahzar. Rahzar continues to serve Shredder until he is killed by Leatherhead. In the fifth season, Rahzar is resurrected as a servant of the demon Kavaxas. He later falls into the Netherworld during Kavaxas's attack on the mortal realm.
- Xever Montes (voiced by Christian Lanz) - An Afro-Brazilian street urchin who was freed from prison by Shredder after being caught stealing an item that belonged to Shredder and was recruited into the Foot Clan. He is often partnered with Bradford, despite the two of them never getting along. Montes was later mutated into a mutant snakehead dubbed Fishface. Montes is given mechanical legs and a breathing device to help him survive on land and becomes a crime lord under the alias Mr. X. In season 5, after Shredder being revived, Fishface decides it is too much for him and leaves the Foot Clan to become an independent criminal.
- Shinigami (voiced by Gwendoline Yeo) - A young witch who is allied with Karai's branch of the Foot Clan and a new ally of the Ninja Turtles who made her debut in season 4 and 5. She makes her comic debut in the IDW comics.
- Tiger Claw (voiced by Eric Bauza) - As a boy, Takeshi was mutated into a mutant Bengal tiger after stumbling into one of the Kraang's portals. He later became an assassin hired by Shredder to aid him in his affairs. In the past, he lost a battle by losing his tail to her own sister named Alopex, who was mutated into an arctic fox, and then his right arm in season 4. In season 5, he formed an underground and gathered his Foot Cultist to obtain the Demodragon Scroll to finally summon the demon Kavaxas and raise Shredder from the dead. Succeeding, Tiger Claw is betrayed and joins the Turtles to defeat Shredder and Kavaxas, declaring a truce with them.

=== 2014 film members ===
- Eric Sacks (portrayed by William Fichtner) - The CEO of Sacks Industries who was adopted at a young age by Shredder.

=== 2018 series members ===
- Foot Lieutenant (voiced by Rob Paulsen) - A tall and thin member of the Foot Clan serves as the Foot Clan's lieutenant.
- Foot Brute (voiced by Maurice LaMarche) - A super-strong member of the Foot Clan who is partnered with the Foot Lieutenant.
- Origami Ninjas - The Foot Ninja soldiers made of paper.
  - Franken-Foot - A patchwork Origami Ninja made by Raphael from the remnants of many Origami Ninjas as a sparring partner, who joins the Turtles' side.
- Foot Recruit (Cassandra "Casey" Jones) (voiced by Zelda Williams) - Cassandra "Casey" Jones is a member of the Foot Clan with a hyper-aggressive personality.
- Jocelyn (voiced by Cree Summer) - A Foot Initiate who gains the mark of the Foot Initiate in "How to Make Enemies and Bend People to Your Will." The Foot Recruit claimed to Baron Draxum that she got the mark because her parents are "big donors."

== Analysis ==
Peter Vogl, referring to the movie from 1990, found the teenage members of the Foot Clan a remarkably dark representation of the youths of New York, who are so depraved and without moral compass that they prefer to follow a Japanese gangster boss rather than the generation of their parents. He found that this culture-pessimistic vision seems implausible only at first glance, considering actual cases of youths from Western countries following the Islamic State. He also pointed out that the root of the challenge depicted in Teenage Mutant Ninja Turtles is not domestic, but Shredder and his assistants come from abroad. Vogl concludes that, even if not intended by the creators, the movie employs fears of city crime, of the young generation, and of foreignness.
