= Donatello (Teenage Mutant Ninja Turtles) =

Fictional mutant

- Teenage Mutant Ninja Turtles character
- Textless Planet Awesome exclusive cover variant of Teenage Mutant Ninja Turtles #98. Art by series co-creator Kevin Eastman
- First appearance: Teenage Mutant Ninja Turtles #1 (May 1984)
- Created by: Kevin Eastman; Peter Laird
- Portrayed by: Mainline: Leif Tilden (1990 and 1991 films); Jim Raposa (Teenage Mutant Ninja Turtles III); Richard Yee (Ninja Turtles: The Next Mutation); Jeremy Howard (2014 and 2016 films)
- Voiced by: Mainline: Barry Gordon (1987 series, Operation Blue Line, 2012 series crossover episodes, Nickelodeon All-Star Brawl, Shredder's Revenge, Nickelodeon Kart Racers 3: Slime Speedway); Corey Feldman (1990 film and Teenage Mutant Ninja Turtles III); Adam Carl (Secret of the Ooze); Jason Gray-Stanford (The Next Mutation); Sam Riegel (2003 series, Turtles in Time Re-Shelled, Smash-Up, and Turtles Forever); Mitchell Whitfield (2007 film and video game); Rob Paulsen (2012 series, Danger of the Ooze, Half-Shell Heroes: Blast to the Past, and Portal Power); Jeremy Howard (2014 and 2016 films); Josh Brener (Rise of the Teenage Mutant Ninja Turtles series and film); Micah Abbey (Mutant Mayhem and 2024 series); Others: Greg Berg (1987 series substitute for seven episodes); Anthony Haden Salerno ('87 counterpart in Turtles Forever); Clay Adams (Mirage counterpart in Turtles Forever); Yuri Lowenthal (2013 video game); Gavin Hammon (Mutants in Manhattan); Baron Vaughn (DC crossover film); Dale Inghram (Splintered Fate)

In-universe information
- Species: Mutant turtle
- Affiliation: Teenage Mutant Ninja Turtles
- Weapon: Bō
- Family: Master Splinter (adoptive father); Leonardo, Raphael, and Michelangelo (brothers)
- Home: New York sewers, United States
- Abilities: Mastery of ninjutsu, naginata and bō, kobudō, and chi gong, and stealth; Superhuman agility, speed, and strength; Genius-level intellect; Scientist, engineer, and inventor; Energy constructs (Rise of the TMNT)

Donatello, nicknamed Donnie or Don, is a superhero and one of the four main characters of the Teenage Mutant Ninja Turtles comics and all related media. He is the smartest and often gentlest of his brothers, wearing a purple mask over his eyes. He wields a bō, his primary signature weapon in all media.

He is the adoptive son of Master Splinter and the brother of Leonardo, Raphael, and Michelangelo. He is the most rational and logical of the turtles, and second-in-command of the team. Donatello has a natural aptitude for science and technology and often speaks in technobabble. Thus, he generally prefers using gadgets in battle over hand-to-hand combat, although just as skilled as his brothers in that regard. Like his brothers, he is named after an Italian Renaissance artist, in this case Donatello. He is the favorite turtle of co-creator Peter Laird, who served as the basis of Donatello's personality.

== Comic books ==
=== Mirage Comics ===
In the comics, Donatello is depicted as the calmest turtle. While the comics' portrayal of the team has no official command structure, he is depicted as the next in command in the early stories, and the closest brother to Leonardo. In the first issue, he is the one that killed the Shredder by knocking him and his grenade off the roof. The second issue elaborated more on each turtles' personalities and opened with Donatello soldering a circuit. Later in the issue, Donatello reveals his familiarity with computer systems by helping April O'Neil deactivate the Mousers. During the turtles' exile to Northampton, Donatello becomes obsessed with fixing up and repairing the many broken things within the farmhouse they were living in. Most notably he spent days and nights fixing the boiler to give his family hot running water and builds a windmill and a water wheel to provide electricity. He also finds an old typewriter and writes his own personal credo.

In the Donatello one-shot, Donatello encounters an artist called Kirby (an homage to the comic artist Jack Kirby) whose mysterious crystal brings his drawings to life before disappearing. The two newfound friends journey to a dimension inhabited by Kirby's creations and help the heroes defeat the invading monsters.

In the Shades of Grey storyline, Casey Jones encounters the turtle by a ravine as he was pondering "the fractal structure of natural patterns". Casey accuses the turtle of using big words and acting better than everyone else. Donatello suggests they should continue the conversation when Casey is sober. Grabbing a stick, an angry Jones continually pokes the turtle until he loses his temper and sends Casey careening into the water.

In the City at War storyline, the turtles return to New York to put an end to the Foot Clan's civil war. During a battle with Shredder's Elite Guards in the ruins of the Second Time Around Shop, Donatello falls through the floor and breaks his leg. Seeing their ally Karai subdued and about to be killed, Donatello grabs one of the Foot's machine guns and repeatedly shoots the Foot Elite. Donatello is visibly shaken by the violence and throws the gun away. At the end of the story the turtles, April and Casey move back to New York save for Donatello who chooses to stay in Northampton with Master Splinter to heal from his injury as well as reflect on everything that had happened. After encountering the turtle vigilante ally Nobody in civilian guise he returns with him to New York to help his brothers battle Baxter Stockman.

Donatello later finds an armored truck in the sewers which apparently had been part of a bank robbery in the sixties. Along with Raphael and Casey Jones, he undertakes the task of fixing up the vehicle. Donatello decides to accompany the Utroms on a mission to Tepui to search for two missing research teams. The group are attacked by strange wooden creatures who shrink them to miniature size. The creatures turn out to be a group of Utroms which had been stranded in the Jungle during their first stay on Earth and had been living in secret thanks to their Quantum Inversion Redimensioning device which could alter their size. The process could not be reversed on Donatello, possibly due to his mutation, leaving him the size of an action figure. While the Utroms work on returning him to normal, Donatello put his new size to use infiltrating a terrorist organizations warehouse. He has also made a robotic body for him made to resemble a turtle to help him move around.

=== Image Comics ===
In the Image Comics incarnation of the TMNT, he became a cyborg after his body was partially destroyed after he was shot and dropped out of a helicopter (he maintained a positive attitude nonetheless, although he was constantly at risk of losing his mind to the cyborg half). He was almost killed by Image character Deathwatch by having his brain drained of mutagen, while assailing with mental torture tactics. Leonardo blamed the CPU of his injured brother's armor for his subsequent brain death; however, Donatello was not dead but was somehow separated from his body, and with the help of his brothers he returned to his body. In the independent published series of the Image Comics, Issue #24, Don's armor began to malfunction and was so powerful Donatello was on his last legs until he made a deal with Baxter Stockman who Don was reluctant to work with but had no choice. Donatello is rid of most of his body metal by issue #25 and Baxter informs him his shell had regrown and as a result he was back to being a non-cyborg turtle. Baxter died once more when Don's metal particles would not help restore his body; as a result Baxter requested Donatello give April O'Neil his regards and he died laughing maniacally. Donatello then went on to battle Lady Shredder and the Foot Clan with his brothers and Pimiko. Donatello was then by the end of the issue completely rid of all metal particles and had kept his and Baxter's ordeal a secret.

In the official IDW-published conclusion, TMNT Urban Legends, after Dr. X activated an EMP, the living armor abandoned Donatello for a new host, where it was discovered the armor had been impeding Donatello's natural healing abilities.

=== Archie Comics ===
Donatello's appearance in the Archie publications were largely based on the 1987 Fred Wolf incarnation, but with Mirage writers on board at Teenage Mutant Ninja Turtles Adventures such as Steve Murphy and Ryan Brown, a lot of references to his Mirage counterpart were made. Donatello was showcased to be pure of heart and soul, being able to pass through the Netherworld unscathed. He was also chosen of the Turtles by a group of Aliens known as the Sons of Silence to share their wisdom. He was one of the few who could telepathically communicate with them. Donatello was almost a pacifist, detesting every time he used violence.

=== IDW Publishing ===
Donatello was seemingly killed at the end of issue #44 when Leonardo, Raphael and Michelangelo were on a mission to stop Krang from transforming the Earth using an alien device called the "Technodrome". Donatello was left at the home base, and while the others were away, he was attacked by Bebop and Rocksteady. After a brief fight, Rocksteady smashed Donatello's shell, nearly killing him.

The news of Donatello's apparent death spread across the internet and IGN conducted an interview with script writer Tom Waltz, where he called the final scene a beautiful rendered scene, catching the emotion of the family. He also claimed there was no earthly way that Donatello could survive, but at the same time, he said it was not the end of him and his career.

In Issue #45, it was revealed that Donatello was not dead as his spirit was in an alternate plane and he was barely clinging to life. Leonardo, Michelangelo and Raphael carried Donatello's body into the freezer to slow down the bleeding and increase his chance of survival. Fugitoid says he needs to go to Burrow Island to get the equipment to save Donatello. Splinter finds Donatello's spirit and guides his son back to earth, however, due to Donatello wearing a helmet to keep his consciousness alive, his mind is in Metalhead, while his own body is being restored to how it was before his near demise.

In Issue #46, In Harold's lab, Donatello-as-Metalhead finishes prepping his body to be moved to the lair. He tries his best to remain brave, but being trapped in a robot body has been an upsetting experience. The Fugitoid tries to help Donnie adapt to having his mind in a robot body while Harold sees to Metalhead's repairs (the robot having been trashed by Bebop and Rocksteady). Raphael storms off with Alopex following behind him. Raphael starts regretting leaving Donatello behind and seeing him in a robot body is too much for Raphael to handle, but as soon as Alopex and Leonardo give him some comfort he eventually accepts Donatello as Metalhead and he, Leo and Mikey go on patrol while Donatello and the Fugitoid transfer Donnie's turtle body to the lair of the turtles while Harold gets some equipment to help Donatello get back into his own body.

In issue #47, He mentioned to Fugitoid and Harold he is connected to his body's vital signs. Indicating he could still feel his body and was slowly getting back to normal. In issue #50, Metalhead self-destructed and Donatello returned to his organic body which has now been outfitted with an artificial shell. Since then he has been fighting alongside his brothers.

== Television ==
=== 1987 animated series ===
Donatello appears in the 1987 animated television series, voiced by Barry Gordon, and understudied for 7 episodes by Greg Berg. In this series, he is depicted as the genius of the group who invents many of the turtles' vehicles and equipment including the Turtle Van, the Turtle Blimp and the Turtle Com. He is the calmer turtle out of the 4 turtles. Donatello made many revolutionary inventions, the most notable being the portable portal capable of opening gateways to other dimensions as well as an early warning system which warns of impending attacks from other dimensions or from Krang and Shredder.

Gordon reprised the role of the 1987 Donatello in five episodes of the 2012 TV series, "Wormquake!", "Trans-Dimensional Turtles" and the three part series final "Wanted: Bebop & Rocksteady".

=== Coming Out of Their Shells Tour ===
The 1990 TMNT: Coming Out of Their Shells would have its first show broadcast from Radio City Music Hall on Pay Per View and later released on VHS. Donatello would be depicted as playing both a portable electric keyboard and in some iterations of the show after this initial show, a keyboard guitar. He was also depicted as having constructed all of the Turtles instruments. The Making Of VHS tape, which was set in the fictional 'universe' of the concert, depicted the Turtles as real people, and expanded on Donatello's interest in electronics, and confirms the concert's claim that he constructed the Turtles' instruments. He is also shown helping backstage during the construction of the set for the inaugural show.

=== 1997 live-action series ===
Donatello appeared in the live-action series, Ninja Turtles: The Next Mutation, as well as the crossover episode of Power Rangers in Space, portrayed by Richard Yee and voiced by Jason Gray-Stanford.

=== 2003 animated series ===
Donatello appears in the 2003 animated series, voiced by Sam Riegel. However he is more pacifistic in this incarnation. His skin color is a medium olive green color; this particular color is only used for him in the 2003 animation.

In the S3E21 titled Same as It Never Was, Donatello is transported into a future by Ultimate Drako where Shredder has taken over the planet and the Turtles were unable to stop him and lost Splinter and Casey Jones to him and later split up because of infighting due to Donatello's absence.

In the S4E17 Outbreak, during an outbreak of mutations of people and animals in New York, Donatello got a nasty gash by a monster while fighting several monsters with his brothers.

Then in the episode two-part episode "Return of Savanti", in Season 4, Donatello caught the sniffles. Later, in the episode "Adventures in Turtlesitting", he went from a turtle who was home ill with the flu to a monster himself as a result of being infected by the outbreak.

In the seventh season, also called "Back to the Sewer", Donatello blamed himself for Master Splinter's decompiling and vowed to restore his bits from cyberspace. This obsession caused him to disregard anything else, such as the gang war between the Foot Clan and the Purple Dragons, as unimportant. It was not until seeing his brothers in danger from the Cyber Shredder did he realize he was ignoring his responsibilities to help them and promised not to let his obsession with saving Master Splinter take control again.

=== 2012 animated series ===
Donatello, as depicted in the 2012 Nickelodeon series.

Donatello appears in Nickelodeon's 2012 animated series, voiced by Rob Paulsen. In this version, Donatello has a crush on April O'Neil (who is also in her teenage years in this adaptation). Despite Donatello being quiet, sensitive, and friendly, and a genius he also can be sarcastic and is here more prone to panicking and losing his temper. Donatello is active and purpose-driven, but at times does not understand and/or has a hard time grasping the lectures of Master Splinter. A running gag is Raphael scolding or hitting him whenever he voices scientific facts in dire situations. His character design was also updated, giving him a gap in his teeth and a taller, leaner appearance than his brothers. In this version, he wields a bō staff that converts to a naginata (Japanese glaive).

Donatello also shows to have a heart as big as his intelligence as he, like his brother Michelangelo, care for humans and creatures that others find a nuisance like The Pulverizer and Bigfoot. His passion to help others is most demonstrated when he creates a retro-mutagen to undo mutations that happen throughout the series.

=== Rise of the Teenage Mutant Ninja Turtles ===
Donatello, as depicted in Rise of the Teenage Mutant Ninja Turtles

Donatello appears once again in the 2018 series Rise of the Teenage Mutant Ninja Turtles, voiced by Josh Brener. This version is described as "an unflappable mechanical genius and tech wizard whose ninja skills are second only to his coding." This incarnation of Donatello is more confident, level-headed, avoidant of physical contact, and sarcastic, as well as autistic. He wields a high-tech bō staff modified by rocket boosters. In this version, Donatello is depicted as being a soft-shelled turtle and wearing a harder battle shell to protect him during day-to-day activities. Other iconic features of this Donatello include his drawn-on eyebrows and his mystic tech goggles.

In Rise of the Teenage Mutant Ninja Turtles: The Movie, Donnie mostly takes a backseat with Mikey, looking out for each other while they fight against the Krang. The two manage to seize control of the Technodrome, with Donnie organically connecting to the ship's main controls, before being ripped out by Krang Leader. After Leo sacrifices himself to save Earth from the Krang invasion, Mikey is able to open a portal to the prison dimension with the help of Donnie and Raph and rescue Leo.

== Movies ==
=== Original trilogy (1990–1993) ===
Donatello appears in the first three live action films. He is depicted as more childish than he was in the Mirage comics and the 1987 animated series, as he is shown joking around more and is the skateboarder of the team. He is voiced by Corey Feldman in the first movie. In the second film, Teenage Mutant Ninja Turtles II: The Secret of the Ooze, Adam Carl provided his voice. He finds himself dejected when professor Perry reveals that the turtles' creation was a mere accident, as the ooze was just the result of chemical spillage rather than a deliberate product, but Splinter comforts him by telling him their worth is not defined by their past. He later assists Perry with the creation of an antidote to the Ooze, which the turtles use on Shredder's mutant minions, Tokka and Rahzar. In the third film, Feldman reprises his role from the first film. He is the only Turtle who is not tempted to stay in the Feudal Japan of the past, saying that he cannot live without technology.

=== 2007 film ===
Donatello has a supporting role in the 2007 film, voiced by Mitchell Whitfield. In the film, Donatello runs an IT tech support line to earn money for the family and keeps an eye on Mikey. He also serves as the turtles' unofficial leader until Leonardo returns from training in Central America.

=== Reboot series (2014–2016) ===
Donatello appears in Teenage Mutant Ninja Turtles (2014), portrayed by Jeremy Howard. In this film, Donatello is the brains of the team and relies heavily on high-tech equipment and gear. His personality in this film is very calm and measured, and was also given a much more nerdy portrayal than in previous adaptations, on account of his large glasses with the middle taped. He also has a similar personality to his 1987 and 2003 counterparts where he is always talking of calculations and constantly confusing his brothers with them. He is also the one who stopped the toxic poison that Shredder had activated on Sacks Tower. Like Michelangelo and Leonardo, Donatello wears a glove on his left hand, has a tech pack on his shell and boots although you can partly see his toes making only him, Raphael and Michelangelo the only turtles to stay true to their other incarnations with the two toes. Donatello appears in the sequel, Teenage Mutant Ninja Turtles: Out of the Shadows, with Howard reprising his role. In the film, Donatello discovers the mutagen Shredder used on Bebop and Rocksteady can be used to turn the turtles into humans, which Michelangelo overhears, leading to a brief friction between the team. He later hacks into the Technodrome's computer, allowing the turtles to find the beacon Krang is using to build it and send it back to Krang's native dimension.

=== DC crossover film ===
Donatello appears in the direct-to-video crossover film Batman vs. Teenage Mutant Ninja Turtles, voiced by Baron Vaughn. He is the one who located the Batcave after an encounter with Batman. After becoming allies, he soon becomes fast friends with Batgirl and concocts an anti-mutagen alongside her to reverse the effects and nullify the plans of the Shredder and Ra's al Ghul, who developed a mutant army out of their henchmen. Near the climax, Ghul breaks Donatello's arm from a counter attack, resulting in Donatello having to guide Michelangelo through disabling the mutagen-disseminating device, which he does by recklessly smashing its parts. At the film's conclusion, Donatello's arm is placed in a sling by Alfred before he partakes in eating pizza with his brothers and newfound allies.

=== Mutant Mayhem ===
Donatello appears in Teenage Mutant Ninja Turtles: Mutant Mayhem, the first animated Teenage Mutant Ninja Turtles film since TMNT (2007). He is shown to wear glasses, in contrast to his previous designs, and is voiced by Micah Abbey. It's established that this iteration of Donnie is a late bloomer, as shown by his younger sounding voice. He ends up forming a strong bond with Wingnut and Leatherhead due to their shared interest in technology. He is also shown to be a fan of human popular culture, referencing anime series such as Attack on Titan.

Donatello appears in the follow-up TV series Tales of the Teenage Mutant Ninja Turtles, with Abbey reprising his role.

== Video games ==
In the video games based on the 1987 animated series, Donatello has the longest range, although he cannot inflict as much damage as Leonardo, who has the second-longest range; one notable exception is the first NES game, where Donatello both did the most damage and had the longest range, though his attacks were slow. This has been carried over into the games inspired by the 2003 animated series. In TMNT: Smash Up, he is voiced by Sam Riegel.

Donatello is one of the main playable characters in Teenage Mutant Ninja Turtles: Out of the Shadows, where he is voiced by Yuri Lowenthal. Donatello also appears in the 2014 film-based game, voiced by Oliver Vaquer.

Donatello is featured as one of the playable characters from Teenage Mutant Ninja Turtles as DLC in Injustice 2, voiced by Joe Brogie. While Leonardo is the default turtle outside the gear loadout, he, Michelangelo, and Raphael can only be picked through the said loadout selection similar to the premier skin characters.

Donatello is featured as a TMNT season pass in Smite as a Sun Wukong skin, voiced by Landon McDonald. He is also available as a skin in Brawlhalla.

Donatello is also a main playable character in the sequel to Turtles in Time, titled Teenage Mutant Ninja Turtles: Shredder's Revenge. In the game, Donatello once more carries a high range stat, balanced by an average power stat and low speed. This is the first official Teenage Mutant Ninja Turtles game in which he is played by his original voice actor, Barry Gordon. The Mutant Mayhem version of Donatello is set to appear as a playable character via downloadable content in Sonic Racing: CrossWorlds.
