= Krang =

Fictional Teenage Mutant Ninja Turtles character

- Krang as he appeared on the variant cover of Teenage Mutant Ninja Turtles #73 (August 2017 IDW). Art by Kevin Eastman.

Publication information
- Publisher: Archie Comics; IDW Publishing
- First appearance: "Enter The Shredder" (1987)
- Created by: David Wise; Patti Howeth

In-story information
- Species: Utrom or Alien Brain
- Place of origin: Dimension X
- Notable aliases: Lord Krang (Teenage Mutant Ninja Turtles (1987 TV series)); Kraang Prime (Teenage Mutant Ninja Turtles (2012 TV series)); General Krang (Teenage Mutant Ninja Turtles (IDW Publishing) and Teenage Mutant Ninja Turtles: Mutants in Manhattan); Krang Leader (Rise of the Teenage Mutant Ninja Turtles: The Movie)

Krang (also spelled Kraang) is a supervillain appearing in Teenage Mutant Ninja Turtles-related media, most frequently in the 1987 animated series and its associated merchandise, such as the Teenage Mutant Ninja Turtles Adventures comic book and many TMNT video games. The character has endured as one of the franchise's most prominent antagonists and a major foe of the Ninja Turtles.

Krang's first comics appearance was in Teenage Mutant Ninja Turtles Adventures #1, published by Archie Comics in August 1988. In the 1987 TV series, Krang was voiced by Pat Fraley. He also appeared as General Krang in the 2012 IDW comic publication. Krang made his first live action appearance in Teenage Mutant Ninja Turtles: Out of the Shadows, which was a sequel to the 2014 film, with his voice provided by Brad Garrett.

Krang was created by David Wise, with inspirations from the Utroms - a species who appeared in the original Mirage Studios continuity.

In the 2012 series, Krang is referred to as Kraang Prime, and is a deranged Utrom who mind-controlled most of the Utrom populace into becoming a subservient, rogue hive mind faction known as the Kraang.

In Rise of the Teenage Mutant Ninja Turtles: The Movie, Krang is referred to as Krang Leader (credited as Krang One), who leads his siblings, Krang Sister (credited as Krang Two) and Krang Brother (credited as Krang Three).

== Relating to the Utroms ==
Krang's physical appearance was inspired by the Utroms from the original TMNT comic book. In several subsequent series, such as the 2012 IDW comic series, he is an Utrom himself.

== 1987 series ==
Krang, as he appeared in the 1987 animated series Teenage Mutant Ninja Turtles.

Prior to the start of the 1987 series, Krang was a reptilian creature in command of an army of Rock Soldiers under the leadership of General Traag. He took command of the Technodrome, a powerful mobile battle fortress, and banished Von Drakus, who helped Krang build it, to Earth. When he was banished from Dimension X, Krang was stripped of his body and reduced to a brain-like form forced to use small android walkers or small platforms to move. His android bodies are equipped with a variety of weapons.

While on Earth, Krang allies with Shredder, who, along with his Foot Soldier army, moves into the Technodrome. In exchange, Shredder had to design and build a new body for Krang, a human-shaped exo-suit referred to as his "android body".

Krang's ultimate goal is to take over the Earth; it probably only became his objective after he was exiled on the Earth, but this point is never made clear. Every plan Krang conceives is either aimed at that goal, or towards the short-term objective of powering up the Technodrome. He does not share Shredder's obsession with the Turtles and Splinter; while Shredder sees them as mortal enemies, Krang seems to regard them more like annoyances.

The Turtles eventually transport the Technodrome back to Dimension X. At that point, Krang and Shredder begin operating out of an old science building. Krang and Shredder eventually return to the Technodrome in the season 8 episode "Turtle Trek", but the Turtles destroy the engines of the Technodrome, trapping it and its inhabitants in Dimension X.

Krang also appears in the 2009 crossover film Turtles Forever, in which he, Shredder and the Turtles from the 1987 show end up in the 2003 universe. In the film, Krang is voiced by Bradford Cameron.

Krang appears in the 2012 animated series, with Pat Fraley reprising the role. Krang is said to be a cousin of Kraang Sub-Prime who wound up exiled to that dimension because he was a screw-up. He attempts to destroy the Mirage, 1987, and 2012 universes, the latter of which the Kraang had especially been trying to conquer, using Sub-Prime's desire to "wipe out the Turtles at any cost" as leverage. Sub-Prime banishes him back to the 1987-universe once this is revealed.

Krang returns in the three-part episode "Wanted: Bebop and Rocksteady". where he and the 80s Shredder escape to the 2012 dimension and made use of its Bebop and Rocksteady. Both Turtle groups as well as Bebop and Rocksteady thwart Krang and 80s Shredder's plot.

== IDW Comics ==
In the IDW Comics, Krang is both an Utrom and a denizen of Dimension X. He is the heir of Quanin, the former Prime Minister of the Utroms' ruling council who appointed himself Emperor and aggressively expanded the Utrom domain into an empire. However, his megalomaniacal expansion drive both deprived his home planet of its most essential natural resource, the Ooze, and incited rebellion among the subjugated people of Dimension X, eventually leading to the destruction of Utrominon. Krang, who was as brutal as his father but opposed his uncautious politics, fled with a few survivors of his people through an interdimensional portal to Burnow Island on Earth, where he established a base from which he intended to xenoform Earth into a new home for his people, which he calls "new Utrominon".

In order to augment his troops, Krang, initially disguised as a despotic human warlord, forms a business relationship with Baxter Stockman, head of the genetics research institute Stock Gen, and supplies him with Ooze, which could be used as a natural mutagen on Earth's organisms. Krang seeks this mutagen to use in healing the surviving utroms he took with him from Utrominon. It is through Stockman's experiments that the Teenage Mutant Ninja Turtles and Splinter evolve into intelligent, humanoid mutants. When the Turtles learn of Krang's genocidal plans thanks to their human friend April O'Neil, a former intern at Stock Gen, they, together with their ally, the Fugitoid (a former Neutrino scientist who was forcibly conscripted by Krang to complete his xenoforming machine, the Technodrome), and the Foot Clan stop Krang from destroying the Earth. Krang is surrendered to the Neutrinos for trial for his numerous war crimes.

While imprisoned on Neutrino, Krang hires the bounty hunter Hakk-R to eliminate several material witnesses in order to get the trial cancelled, but Hakk-R fails thanks to the efforts of the Turtles. Eventually, Krang is found guilty and sentenced to permanent exile from Dimension X on Earth. However, Leatherhead, one of his former victims and a key witness in the trial, refuses to accept the mild verdict and kills Krang by devouring him. However, as the Fugitoid belatedly realizes, the Utroms possess a natural parasitic physiology, enabling Krang to regenerate himself and possess Leatherhead's body. Krang continues to work on his own schemes, but his leadership of the Utroms is usurped by his former subordinate Ch'rell, and he is executed by King Zenter out of spite.

== 2003 series ==
Krang makes a small cameo appearance in the episode "Secret Origins" of the 2003 series. As the Utroms are all walking to the transmat to go back home, one of them complains, "I hate walking on my tentacles," to which another Utrom replies, "Oh, shut up, Krang!". This Krang is voiced by Wayne Grayson.

== 2012 series ==
An alien species based on both Krang and the Utroms appear in the 2012 Nickelodeon series, named the Kraang. Kraang Prime is the leader of the hive mind and was a normal Utrom scientist until he made the mutagen, which he used to mutate himself into Kraang Prime. He then used his powers to enslave most of the Utroms. In the 40th Anniversary Comics Celebration, it is revealed that after his final defeat, Kraang Prime's cells survived and began to absorb every living being it came across, eventually developing a consciousness and taking a humanoid form, renaming itself Kraang Primordius with the intent to consume everything.

The Kraang are voiced by Nolan North, and Kraang Prime was initially voiced by Roseanne Barr and later by Rachael Butera. Kraang Sub-Prime is voiced by Gilbert Gottfried.

== Rise of the Teenage Mutant Ninja Turtles ==
Krang Leader in Rise of the Teenage Mutant Ninja Turtles: The Movie.

In the series Rise of the Teenage Mutant Ninja Turtles and its Netflix film sequel Rise of the Teenage Mutant Ninja Turtles: The Movie, the Krang is an alien species that landed on ancient Earth bringing with them a mutagen known as Empyrean, which created the Yōkai race. During feudal times in Japan, the Krang gifted Oroku Saki, leader of the Foot Clan, with the dark armor Kuroi Yōroi, which allowed Saki to defeat the Foot's enemies, but ended up possessing and transforming him into the evil Shredder and leading the Foot clan into worshiping them. Eventually, a group of warriors created the mystic weapon key and used it to banish the Krang into another realm for a thousand years. During the series finale, Shredder unearths the remains of a Krang inside a buried ship while looking for Empyrean to fulfill his goals. By the time the Foot opens the portal to set them free, only three of them have survived their exile, they then possess the members of the Foot Clan and turn them into monstrous minions (with the same fate later befalling Raphael, until Leo snaps him out of it) and proceed to take over the highest building of the city in order to open a portal big enough for their ship Technodrome to crossover.

Unlike the previous versions of the Krang, who mostly relied on their intellect and had to fight with an Exo-Skin, this version is more powerful and deadly and is capable of fighting without the use of any kind of tech and are virtually unstoppable in their suits. Their method of mutation also greatly differs from prior incarnations in that they utilise a form of bio-growth that takes over or mutates anything it touches, to the point that it can control inorganic matter. Their members include the mastermind behind their plan who leads the other two, a female Krang who leads the possessed slaves into battle and has a temper, and a silent one who is in charge of spreading the bio-growth, creating the portal and piloting the Technodrome. The female one lost her right eye at the hands of April and was defeated by her, Splinter and Casey Jones and later captured by humans, the silent one was restrained by Donatello when he seized control of Technodrome and presumably destroyed with the ship and the leader was exiled again at the hands of Leonardo.

Krang One is voiced by Jim Pirri and Krang Two is voiced by Toks Olagundoye.

== Film ==
Brad Garrett voices Krang in Teenage Mutant Ninja Turtles: Out of the Shadows, the first official live-action appearance of the character. This version looks accurate to his comics version in terms of him being a large brain with facial features, though his robot is more gray and robotic. It also has thin strips of plating that look like skin, a reference to the humanoid design employed by the comics version. Fred Armisen was originally going to voice the character, but scheduling conflicts made him unavailable.

== Video games ==
In Teenage Mutant Ninja Turtles: Smash-Up, one of the players is a Utrominator drone, a Utrom enslaved by Shredder in the 2003 series.

The Kraang are one of the enemies in Teenage Mutant Ninja Turtles: Out of the Shadows, voiced by Keith Szarabajka. The Turtles infiltrate the TCRI building in search for Shredder, who has been stealing their technology for Baxter Stockman to invent him a telepathic helmet as a way to defeat the Turtles.

Krang is the secondary antagonist in Teenage Mutant Ninja Turtles: Mutants in Manhattan, voiced by Steve Blum. He teams up with Shredder to distract the Turtles so his Foot Soldiers and mutant allies can collect alien parts to construct a giant portal to Dimension X, to which Krang will initiate an invasion against Earth.

Krang appears in Teenage Mutant Ninja Turtles: Shredder's Revenge, voiced by Sean Gurnsey. Krang's android body parts are scattered for the villains try to repair. However, this was actually a distraction to where he is actually turning the Statue of Liberty into a new body called the "Statue of Tyranny".

Krang and the Kraang appear in the Teenage Mutant Ninja Turtles: Wrath of the Mutants video game, voiced again by Pat Fraley and Nolan North respectively.
