= Teenage Mutant Ninja Turtles: Danger of the Ooze =

2014 video game

- Developer: WayForward Technologies
- Publisher: Activision
- Director: Tomm Hulett
- Designer: Michael Herbster
- Programmer: Yossi Horowitz
- Artist: Elina Bell
- Writers: Brandon Auman; Tomm Hulett
- Composer: Jake Kaufman
- Series: Teenage Mutant Ninja Turtles
- Engine: EngineBlack
- Platforms: PlayStation 3 Xbox 360; Nintendo 3DS
- Release: PlayStation 3 & Xbox 360; October 28, 2014; Nintendo 3DS; November 11, 2014
- Genres: Action-adventure, Metroidvania
- Mode: Single-player

Teenage Mutant Ninja Turtles: Danger of the Ooze is a 2014 action-adventure game developed by WayForward Technologies and published by Activision. It is the second video game based on the 2012 Teenage Mutant Ninja Turtles TV series and features elements from the show's second and third seasons. It was released as a sequel to the 2013 game Teenage Mutant Ninja Turtles. The game also features gameplay elements and homages to the 1989 Teenage Mutant Ninja Turtles NES game. The digital versions of the game, alongside other Teenage Mutant Ninja Turtles games published by Activision, were pulled from all digital storefronts in January 2017 when the rights expired and they chose not to renew the license.

The Nintendo 3DS version was later bundled on a single cartridge with Teenage Mutant Ninja Turtles and was released as Teenage Mutant Ninja Turtles: Master Splinter's Training Pack on November 3, 2015, by Abstraction Games.

== Development ==
The game was announced by Activision on September 4, 2014. It was released for the PlayStation 3 and Xbox 360 on October 28, 2014, while the Nintendo 3DS version was later released on November 11, 2014, in order to better adapt the graphics. Due to sound limitations, the music on the 3DS version is less synthesized compared to the console versions.

== Reception ==
The game was given generally mixed reviews by critics and fans, though they were still more positive compared to its predecessor. IGN gave it a 5/10 score, calling it "generic and lifeless", but praising the solid, although rudimentary, level design and the exploration elements. Games Asylum gave the game a positive 6/10, praising the gameplay style and fan service, even though it was made on a distinctly limited budget, and considering it an evolvement over the previous Activision-made Teenage Mutant Ninja Turtles games.
