= Teenage Mutant Ninja Turtles IV (disambiguation) =

Teenage Mutant Ninja Turtles IV is a cancelled live-action film.

Teenage Mutant Ninja Turtles IV may also refer to:

- Teenage Mutant Ninja Turtles: Turtles in Time, Nintendo Entertainment System video game, also known as TMNT IV game
- Teenage Mutant Ninja Turtles (2014 film), a fourth live-action installment and the reboot of TMNT film series

== See also ==
- Teenage Mutant Ninja Turtles (disambiguation)
- Teenage Mutant Ninja Turtles II (disambiguation)
- Teenage Mutant Ninja Turtles III (disambiguation)
