= Teenage Mutant Ninja Turtles (disambiguation) =

Teenage Mutant Ninja Turtles is an entertainment franchise about a group of anthropomorphic turtles who fight evil.

Teenage Mutant Ninja Turtles or TMNT may also refer to:

== Comics ==
- Teenage Mutant Ninja Turtles (Mirage Studios), original Mirage Studios comic book series
- Teenage Mutant Ninja Turtles (comic strip), Creators Syndicate comic strip
- Teenage Mutant Ninja Turtles (IDW Publishing), IDW Publishing comic book series

== Television ==
- Teenage Mutant Ninja Turtles (1987 TV series), also known as Teenage Mutant Hero Turtles in Europe and UK
- Teenage Mutant Ninja Turtles (2003 TV series)
- Teenage Mutant Ninja Turtles (2012 TV series)

== Film ==
- Teenage Mutant Ninja Turtles (1990 film), directed by Steve Barron
- Teenage Mutant Ninja Turtles II: The Secret of the Ooze (1991 film) directed by Michael Pressman
- Teenage Mutant Ninja Turtles III (1993 film), directed by Stuart Gillard
- TMNT (2007 film), directed by Kevin Munroe
- Teenage Mutant Ninja Turtles (2014 film), directed by Jonathan Liebesman
- Teenage Mutant Ninja Turtles: Out of the Shadows (2016 film), directed by Dave Green
- Teenage Mutant Ninja Turtles: Mutant Mayhem (2023 film), directed by Jeff Rowe

== Games ==
- Teenage Mutant Ninja Turtles & Other Strangeness, a 1985 pen-and-paper role-playing game
- Teenage Mutant Ninja Turtles (NES video game), a 1989 video game for the Nintendo Entertainment System
- Teenage Mutant Ninja Turtles (arcade game) (US) aka Teenage Mutant Hero Turtles (Europe), a 1989 arcade game
- Teenage Mutant Ninja Turtles: Fall of the Foot Clan aka Teenage Mutant Ninja Turtles (JP), a 1990 Game Boy game
- Teenage Mutant Ninja Turtles (pinball), a 1991 pinball machine
- Teenage Mutant Ninja Turtles (Game Boy Advance), 2003 (GBA)
- Teenage Mutant Ninja Turtles (2003 video game), 2003 (GameCube, PC, PS2, Xbox)
- TMNT (Game Boy Advance), 2007 (GBA)
- TMNT (video game), 2007 (GameCube, NDS, PC, PS2, PSP, Wii, Xbox 360)
- Teenage Mutant Ninja Turtles (2013 video game), 2013 (3DS, Wii, Xbox 360)
- Teenage Mutant Ninja Turtles (2014 video game), 2014 (Android, iOS, 3DS)

== Music ==
- Teenage Mutant Ninja Turtles: The Original Motion Picture Soundtrack, 1990
- TMNT: Teenage Mutant Ninja Turtles (soundtrack), 2007

== See also ==
- Tales of the Teenage Mutant Ninja Turtles (disambiguation)
- Teenage Mutant Ninja Turtles II (disambiguation)
- Teenage Mutant Ninja Turtles III (disambiguation)
- Teenage Mutant Ninja Turtles IV (disambiguation)
- Teenage Mutant Ninja Turtles action figures
- Teenage Mutant Ninja Turtles food tie-ins
