= List of Teenage Mutant Ninja Turtles (1987 TV series) episodes =

The following is an episode list for the animated television series Teenage Mutant Ninja Turtles which premiered in 1987. In total, 193 episodes aired between 1987 and 1996. The first three seasons were aired in syndication. CBS aired the rest of the series on Saturday mornings.

From August 14, 2012, and onwards, all ten seasons are available on DVD in North America from Lionsgate Home Entertainment, the successor to Family Home Entertainment, which released the series' VHS tapes in North America (early Lionsgate DVD releases were co-branded with FHE).

== Series overview ==
Season	Episodes	Originally released		
Season	Episodes	First released	Last released	Network
1	5	December 28, 1987	January 1, 1988	Syndication
2	13	October 1, 1988	December 24, 1988	Syndication
3	47	September 25, 1989	December 15, 1989	Syndication
4	41	September 8, 1990	March 29, 1991	Syndication (15 episodes); CBS (26 episodes)
5	20	September 14, 1991	November 16, 1991	CBS
6	16	September 19, 1992	November 7, 1992	CBS
7	27	September 18, 1993	October 30, 1993	CBS
8	8	September 17, 1994	November 5, 1994	CBS
9	8	September 16, 1995	November 4, 1995	CBS
10	8	September 14, 1996	November 2, 1996	CBS

== Episodes ==
=== Season 1 (1987-88) ===
- All five first-season episodes were written by David Wise and Patti Howeth. The chief director was Yoshikatsu Kasai, who was not credited in the credits of the English version.

No. overall	No. in season	Title	Animation directed by	Original release date	TV broadcast
1	1	"Turtle Tracks"	Fred Wolf & Vincent Davis	December 28, 1987	S01E01
2	2	"Enter The Shredder"	Fred Wolf & Vincent Davis	December 29, 1987	S01E02
3	3	"A Thing About Rats"	Fred Wolf & Vincent Davis	December 30, 1987	S01E03
4	4	"Hot Rodding Teenagers from Dimension X"	Fred Wolf & Vincent Davis	December 31, 1987	S01E04
5	5	"Shredder & Splintered"	Bill Wolf	January 1, 1988	S01E05

=== Season 2 (1988) ===
- All thirteen second-season episodes were directed by Yoshikatsu Kasai (who was not credited in the credits of the English version) and Fred Wolf.

No. overall	No. in season	Title	Written by	Original release date	TV broadcast
6	1	"Return of the Shredder"	Story by : David Wise and Patti Howeth; Teleplay by : Christy Marx	October 1, 1988; January 3rd, 1990 (BBC One)	S02E01
7	2	"The Incredible Shrinking Turtles"	Larry Parr	October 8, 1988; January 10th, 1990 (BBC One)	S02E02
8	3	"It Came from Beneath the Sewers"	Larry Parr	October 15, 1988; January 17th, 1990 (BBC One)	S02E03
9	4	"The Mean Machines"	Michael Reaves	October 22, 1988; January 24th, 1990 (BBC One)	S02E04
10	5	"Curse of the Evil Eye"	Martin Pasko	October 29, 1988; January 31st, 1990 (BBC One)	S02E05
11	6	"The Case of the Killer Pizzas"	Douglas Booth	November 5, 1988; February 7th, 1990 (BBC One)	S02E06
12	7	"Enter: The Fly"	Michael Reaves and Brynne Stephens	November 12, 1988; February 14th, 1990 (BBC One)	S02E07
13	8	"Invasion of the Punk Frogs"	Michael Reaves	November 19, 1988; February 21st, 1990 (BBC One)	S02E08
14	9	"Splinter No More"	Michael Reaves and Brynne Stephens	November 26, 1988; February 28th, 1990 (BBC One)	S02E09
15	10	"New York's Shiniest"	Richard Merwin	December 3, 1988; March 7th, 1990 (BBC One)	S02E10
16	11	"Teenagers from Dimension X"	Michael Reaves	December 10, 1988; March 14th, 1990 (BBC One)	S02E11
17	12	"The Catwoman from Channel Six"	Richard Merwin	December 17, 1988; March 21st, 1990 (BBC One)	S02E12
18	13	"Return of the Technodrome"	Michael Reaves	December 24, 1988; March 28th, 1990 (BBC One)	S02E13

=== Season 3 (1989) ===
No. overall	No. in season	Title	Directed by	Written by	Original release date	TV broadcast
19	1	"Beneath These Streets"	Bill Wolf	Michael Reaves	September 25, 1989; April 4th, 1990 (BBC One)	S03E01
20	2	"Turtles on Trial"	Bill Wolf	Michael Reaves	September 26, 1989; April 11th, 1990 (BBC One)	S03E07
21	3	"Attack of the 50-Foot Irma"	Bill Wolf	Rowby Goren	September 27, 1989; April 18th, 1990 (BBC One)	S03E08
22	4	"The Maltese Hamster"	Bill Wolf	David Wise	September 28, 1989; April 25th, 1990 (BBC One)	S03E09
23	5	"Sky Turtles"	Bill Wolf	Reed Shelly and Bruce Shelly	September 29, 1989; May 2nd, 1990 (BBC One)	S03E03
24	6	"The Old Switcheroo"	Bill Wolf	Michael Reaves	October 2, 1989; May 9th, 1990 (BBC One)	S03E06
25	7	"Burne's Blues"	Bill Wolf	Story by : Bill Wolf; Teleplay by : Gordon Bressack	October 3, 1989; May 16th, 1990 (BBC One)	S03E17
26	8	"The Fifth Turtle"	Bill Wolf	Francis Moss	October 4, 1989; May 23rd, 1990 (BBC One)	S03E10
27	9	"Enter the Rat King"	Bill Wolf	Buzz Dixon	October 5, 1989; May 30th, 1990 (BBC One)	S03E15
28	10	"Turtles at the Earth's Core"	Bill Wolf	Michael Reaves	October 6, 1989; June 5th, 1990 (BBC One)	S03E16
29	11	"April Fool" A.K.A. "April Foolish"	Reg Lodge	Michael Reaves and Brynne Stephens	October 9, 1989; June 12th, 1990 (BBC One)	S03E02
30	12	"Attack of Big MACC"	Bill Wolf	Francis Moss	October 10, 1989; June 19th, 1990 (BBC One)	S03E23
31	13	"The Ninja Sword of Nowhere"	Bill Wolf	Michael Edens and Mark Edens	October 11, 1989; June 26th, 1990 (BBC One)	S03E12
32	14	"20,000 Leaks Under the City"	Bill Wolf	Bob Schooley and Mark McCorkle	October 12, 1989	S03E18
33	15	"Take Me to Your Leader"	Bill Wolf	David Wise	October 13, 1989	S03E14
34	16	"Four Musketurtles"	Bill Wolf	Doug Molitor	October 16, 1989	S03E32
35	17	"Turtles, Turtles, Everywhere"	Bill Wolf	David Bennett Carren and J. Larry Carroll	October 17, 1989	S03E29
36	18	"Cowabunga Shredhead"	Bill Wolf	Duane Capizzi and Steve Roberts	October 18, 1989	S03E04
37	19	"Invasion of the Turtle Snatchers"	Bill Wolf	Francis Moss	October 19, 1989	S03E05
38	20	"Camera Bugged"	Bill Wolf	Michael Edens and Mark Edens	October 20, 1989	S03E11
39	21	"Green with Jealousy"	Bill Wolf	Reed Shelly and Bruce Shelly	October 23, 1989	S03E13
40	22	"Return of the Fly"	Bill Wolf	Michael Reaves	October 24, 1989	S03E30
41	23	"Casey Jones: Outlaw Hero"	Bill Wolf	David Wise	October 25, 1989	S03E27
42	24	"Mutagen Monster"	Bill Wolf	Michael Edens and Mark Edens	October 26, 1989	S03E26
43	25	"Corporate Raiders from Dimension X"	Bill Wolf	David Wise	October 27, 1989	S03E35
44	26	"Pizza by the Shred"	Reg Lodge	Michael Edens and Mark Edens	October 30, 1989	S03E39
45	27	"Super Bebop & Mighty Rocksteady"	Bill Wolf	David Carren and Larry Carroll	October 31, 1989	S03E21
46	28	"Beware the Lotus"	Bill Wolf	Doug Molitor	November 1, 1989	S03E19
47	29	"Blast from the Past"	Reg Lodge	David Wise	November 2, 1989	S03E22
48	30	"Leatherhead: Terror of the Swamp"	Bill Wolf	Michael Reaves	November 3, 1989	S03E20
49	31	"Michaelangelo's Birthday"	Reg Lodge	Story by : Bill Wolf; Teleplay by : Eliot Daro	November 6, 1989	S03E28
50	32	"Usagi Yojimbo"	Bill Wolf	David Wise	November 7, 1989	S03E33
51	33	"Case of the Hot Kimono"	Bill Wolf	David Bennett Carren, J. Larry Carroll	November 8, 1989	S03E38
52	34	"Usagi Come Home"	Bill Wolf	David Wise	November 9, 1989	S03E36
53	35	"The Making of Metalhead"	Bill Wolf	Michael Reaves	November 10, 1989	S03E31
54	36	"Leatherhead Meets the Rat King"	Bill Wolf	David Wise	November 13, 1989	S03E37
55	37	"The Turtle Terminator"	Reg Lodge	David Bennett Carren and J. Larry Carroll	November 14, 1989	S03E24
56	38	"The Great Boldini"	Bill Wolf	Francis Moss	November 15, 1989	S03E43
57	39	"The Missing Map"	Bill Wolf	David Wise	November 16, 1989	S03E42
58	40	"The Gang's All Here"	Bill Wolf	James A. Davis	November 17, 1989	S03E41
59	41	"The Grybyx"	Reg Lodge	Michael Reaves	November 20, 1989	S03E25
60	42	"Mister Ogg Goes to Town"	Bill Wolf	David Wise	December 15, 1989	S03E44
61	43	"Shredderville"	Bill Wolf	Francis Moss	November 22, 1989	S03E34
62	44	"Bye, Bye, Fly"	Bill Wolf	David Wise	November 23, 1989	S03E40
63	45	"The Big Rip Off"	Bill Wolf	Michael Reaves	November 24, 1989	S03E45
64	46	"The Big Break In"	Bill Wolf	David Wise	November 27, 1989	S03E46
65	47	"The Big Blow Out"	Bill Wolf	David Wise	November 28, 1989	S03E47

=== Season 4 (1990–91) ===
- All forty-one fourth-season episodes were directed by Fred Wolf.

No. overall	No. in season	Title	Written by	Original release date	Production code
66	1	"The Dimension X Story"	David Wise	September 1, 1990 (CBS)	9061-001
67	2	"Donatello's Degree"	Jack Mendelsohn	September 1, 1990 (CBS)	9061-014
68	3	"Son of Return of the Fly II"	David Wise	September 8, 1990 (CBS)	9061-002
69	4	"Raphael Knocks 'Em Dead"	Jack Mendelsohn	September 8, 1990 (CBS)	9061-016
70	5	"The Big Cufflink Caper!"	David Wise	September 14, 1990 (CBS primetime); November 10, 1990 (CBS)	9061-005
71	6	"Bebop and Rocksteady Conquer the Universe"	David Wise	September 15, 1990 (CBS)	9061-008
72	7	"Raphael Meets His Match"	Charles M. Howell IV	September 15, 1990 (CBS)	9061-015
73	8	"Leonardo Lightens Up"	Dan DiStefano	September 22, 1990 (CBS)	9061-018
74	9	"Slash - The Evil Turtle from Dimension X"	David Wise	September 22, 1990 (CBS)	9061-009
75	10	"Farewell, Lotus Blossom!"	David Wise	September 29, 1990 (CBS)	9061-004
76	11	"Were-Rats from Channel 6"	David Wise	October 6, 1990 (CBS)	9061-007
77	12	"Funny, They Shrunk Michaelangelo"	Michael Edens	October 6, 1990 (CBS)	9061-019
78	13	"The Big Zipp Attack"	David Wise	October 13, 1990 (CBS)	9061-003
79	14	"Donatello Makes Time"	Dennis Marks	October 13, 1990 (CBS)	9061-017
80	15	"Rebel Without a Fin"	Michael Reaves	October 20, 1990 (CBS)	9061-010
81	16	"Rhino-Man"	David Wise	October 27, 1990 (CBS)	9061-006
82	17	"Michaelangelo Meets Bugman"	Dennis Marks	October 27, 1990 (CBS)	9061-020
83	18	"Poor Little Rich Turtle"	David Wise	November 3, 1990 (CBS)	9061-011
84	19	"What's Michaelangelo Good For?"	Ted Pedersen and Francis Moss	November 3, 1990 (CBS)	9061-022
85	20	"Leonardo Versus Tempestra"	Misty Taggart	November 10, 1990 (CBS)	9061-021
86	21	"Splinter Vanishes"	Francis Moss and Ted Pedersen	November 17, 1990 (CBS)	9061-026
87	22	"Big Bug Blunder"	Michael Reeves	November 24, 1990 (CBS)	9061-013
88	23	"The Foot Soldiers Are Revolting"	Michael Reaves	November 24, 1990 (CBS)	9061-012
89	24	"Beyond the Donatello Nebula"	Dennis O'Flaherty	December 1, 1990 (CBS)	9061-023
90	25	"Unidentified Flying Leonardo"	Sean Roche	December 1, 1990 (CBS)	9061-024
91	26	"Plan Six from Outer Space"	David Wise	December 1990 (Syndication)	9060-066
92	27	"Turtles of the Jungle"	Misty Taggart	December 1990 (Syndication)	9060-067
93	28	"Name That Toon"	Misty Taggart	December 1990 (Syndication)	9060-074
94	29	"Menace Maestro, Please"	Martin Pasko	December 1990 (Syndication)	9060-075
95	30	"Super Hero for a Day"	Francis Moss and Ted Pedersen	December 1990 (Syndication)	9060-079
96	31	"Back to the Egg"	Dennis Marks	December 1990 (Syndication)	9060-080
97	32	"Raphael Drives 'em Wild"	Misty Taggart	January 12, 1991 (CBS)	9061-025
98	33	"Peking Turtle"	Antonio Ortiz and Carmela Ortiz	February 1991 (Syndication)	9060-069
99	34	"Planet of the Turtles"	George Shea	February 1991 (Syndication)	9060-073
100	35	"Turtlemaniac"	Rowby Goren	February 1991 (Syndication)	9060-072
101	36	"Michaelangelo Toys Around"	Ted Pedersen and Francis Moss	February 1991 (Syndication)	9060-068
102	37	"Shredder's Mom"	Ted Pedersen and Francis Moss	1991 (Syndication)	9060-070
103	38	"Four Turtles and a Baby"	Misty Taggart	1991 (Syndication)	9060-071
104	39	"Rondo in New York"	Francis Moss and Ted Pedersen	1991 (Syndication)	9060-078
105	40	"The Turtles and The Hare"	Misty Taggart	May 1991 (Syndication)	9060-076
106	41	"Once Upon a Time Machine"	Michael Maurer	May 1991 (Syndication)	9060-077

=== Season 5 (1991) ===
- All twenty fifth-season episodes were directed by Fred Wolf.

No. overall	No. in season	Title	Written by	Original release date	TV broadcast
107	1	"My Brother, the Bad Guy"	Dennis O'Flaherty	September 14, 1991	S05E01
108	2	"Michaelangelo Meets Mondo Gecko"	Gary Greenfield	September 14, 1991	S05E02
109	3	"Enter: Mutagen Man"	David Wise	September 21, 1991	S05E03
110	4	"Donatello's Badd Time"	Misty Taggart	September 21, 1991	S05E04
111	5	"Michaelangelo Meets Bugman Again"	David Wise	September 28, 1991	S05E05
112	6	"Muckman Messes Up"	Francis Moss and Ted Pedersen	September 28, 1991	S05E06
113	7	"Napoleon Bonafrog: Colossus of the Swamps"	Dennis O'Flaherty	October 5, 1991	S05E07
114	8	"Raphael Versus The Volcano"	Carole Mendelsohn	October 5, 1991	S05E08
115	9	"Landlord of the Flies"	Gordon Bressack	October 12, 1991	S05E09
116	10	"Donatello's Duplicate"	Jack Mendelsohn & Carole Mendelsohn	October 12, 1991	S05E10
117	11	"The Ice Creature Cometh"	David Wise	October 19, 1991	S05E11
118	12	"Leonardo Cuts Loose"	David Wise	October 19, 1991	S05E12
119	13	"Planet of the Turtleoids"	David Wise	August 31, 1991 (prime-time); October 26, 1991 (Saturday)	S05E19
120	14	"Planet of the Turtleoids"	David Wise	August 31, 1991 (prime-time); October 26, 1991 (Saturday)	S05E20
121	15	"Pirate Radio"	Misty Taggart	November 2, 1991	S05E13
122	16	"Raphael, Turtle of a Thousand Faces"	Dennis O'Flaherty	November 2, 1991	S05E14
123	17	"Leonardo, the Renaissance Turtle"	Dennis O'Flaherty	November 9, 1991	S05E15
124	18	"Zach and the Alien Invaders"	Francis Moss and Ted Pedersen	November 9, 1991	S05E16
125	19	"Welcome Back Polarisoids"	Misty Taggart	November 16, 1991	S05E17
126	20	"Michalangelo, the Sacred Turtle"	Dennis O'Flaherty	November 16, 1991	S05E18

=== Season 6 (1992) ===
- All sixteen sixth-season episodes were directed by Fred Wolf.

No. overall	No. in season	Title	Written by	Original release date	Prod. code
127	1	"Rock Around the Block"	David Wise	September 19, 1992	9062-9201
128	2	"Krangenstein Lives!"	David Wise	September 26, 1992	9062-9202
129	3	"Super Irma"	David Wise	October 3, 1992	9062-9203
130	4	"Adventures in Turtle-Sitting"	Jack Mendelsohn and Carole Mendelsohn	October 24, 1992	9062-9204
131	5	"Sword of Yurikawa"	Marc Handler	October 17, 1992	9062-9205
132	6	"Return of the Turtleoid"	David Wise	September 26, 1992	9062-9206
133	7	"Shreeka's Revenge"	Jack Mendelsohn and Carole Mendelsohn	October 10, 1992	9062-9207
134	8	"Too Hot to Handle"	Jack Mendelsohn and Carole Mendelsohn	October 3, 1992	9062-9208
135	9	"Nightmare in the Lair"	Dennis O'Flaherty	October 17, 1992	9062-9209
136	10	"Phantom of the Sewers"	David Wise	October 24, 1992	9062-9210
137	11	"Donatello Trashes Slash"	David Wise	October 10, 1992	9062-9211
138	12	"Leonardo is Missing"	David Wise	September 19, 1992	9062-9214
139	13	"Snakes Alive!"	David Wise	October 31, 1992	9062-9216
140	14	"Polly Wanna Pizza"	Jack Mendelsohn	October 31, 1992	9062-9213
141	15	"Mr. Nice Guy"	Steve Granat and Cydne Clark	November 7, 1992	9062-9215
142	16	"Sleuth on the Loose"	Matt Uitz	November 7, 1992	9062-9212

=== Season 7: Vacation in Europe (1993) ===
No. overall	No. in season	Title	Directed by	Written by	Original release date	Prod. code
143	1	"Tower of Power"	Bruno-Rene Huchez	Michael Malach	1993	9059-051
144	2	"Rust Never Sleeps"	Bruno-Rene Huchez	Lee Schneider and Matthew Malach	1993	9059-052
145	3	"A Real Snow Job"	Bruno-Rene Huchez	Misty Taggart	1993	9059-053
146	4	"Venice on the Half Shell"	Bruno-Rene Huchez	Misty Taggart	1993	9059-054
147	5	"Artless"	Bruno-Rene Huchez	Doug Molitor	1993	9059-055
148	6	"Night of the Dark Turtle"	Bill Hutten and Tony Love	David Wise	September 18, 1993	9062-9304
149	7	"Ring of Fire"	Bruno-Rene Huchez	Michael Edens	1993	9059-059
150	8	"The Irish Jig Is Up"	Bruno-Rene Huchez	Story by : Carole Mendelsohn; Teleplay by : John Fox	1993	9059-057
151	9	"Shredder's New Sword"	Bruno-Rene Huchez	Francis Moss and Ted Pedersen	1993	9059-058
152	10	"The Lost Queen of Atlantis"	Bruno-Rene Huchez	Michael Edens	1993	9059-056
153	11	"Turtles on the Orient Express"	Bruno-Rene Huchez	Doug Molitor	1993	9059-060
154	12	"The Starchild"	Bill Hutten and Tony Love	David Wise	September 18, 1993	9062-9302
155	13	"April Gets in Dutch"	Bruno-Rene Huchez	Misty Taggart	1993	9059-061
156	14	"Northern Lights Out"	Bruno-Rene Huchez	Ted Pedersen and Francis Moss	1993	9059-062
157	15	"Elementary, My Dear Turtle"	Bruno-Rene Huchez	Dennis O'Flaherty	1993	9059-063
158	16	"The Legend of Koji"	Bill Hutten and Tony Love	David Wise	September 25, 1993	9062-9303
159	17	"Convicts from Dimension X"	Bill Hutten and Tony Love	Jack Mendelsohn	September 25, 1993	9062-9301
160	18	"White Belt, Black Heart"	Bill Hutten and Tony Love	Jack Mendelsohn and Carole Mendelsohn	October 2, 1993	9062-9305
161	19	"Night of the Rogues"	Bill Hutten and Tony Love	David Wise	October 2, 1993	9062-9308
162	20	"Attack of the Neutrinos"	Bill Hutten and Tony Love	David Wise	October 9, 1993	9062-9306
163	21	"Escape from the Planet of the Turtleoids"	Bill Hutten and Tony Love	David Wise	October 9, 1993	9062-9307
164	22	"Revenge of the Fly"	Bill Hutten and Tony Love	David Wise	October 16, 1993	9062-9309
165	23	"Atlantis Awakes"	Bill Hutten and Tony Love	David Wise	October 16, 1993	9062-9313
166	24	"Dirk Savage: Mutant Hunter!"	Bill Hutten and Tony Love	David Wise	October 23, 1993	9062-9310
167	25	"Invasion of the Krangazoids"	Bill Hutten and Tony Love	David Wise	October 23, 1993	9062-9314
168	26	"Combat Land"	Bill Hutten and Tony Love	David Wise	October 30, 1993	9062-9311
169	27	"Shredder Triumphant!"	Bill Hutten and Tony Love	David Wise	October 30, 1993	9062-9312

=== Season 8 (1994) ===
- All eight eighth-season episodes were directed by Tony Love and written by David Wise.

No. overall	No. in season	Title	Original release date	TV broadcast
170	1	"Get Shredder!"	September 17, 1994	S08E01
171	2	"Wrath of the Rat King"	September 24, 1994	S08E02
172	3	"State of Shock"	October 1, 1994	S08E03
173	4	"Cry H.A.V.O.C.!"	October 8, 1994	S08E04
174	5	"H.A.V.O.C. in the Streets!"	October 15, 1994	S08E05
175	6	"Enter: Krakus"	October 22, 1994	S08E06
176	7	"Cyber-Turtles"	October 29, 1994	S08E07
177	8	"Turtle Trek"	November 5, 1994	S08E08

=== Season 9 (1995) ===
- All eight ninth-season episodes were directed by Tony Love.

No. overall	No. in season	Title	Written by	Original release date	TV broadcast
178	1	"The Unknown Ninja"	Mark Edens and Bob Forward	September 16, 1995	S09E01
179	2	"Dregg of the Earth"	Mark Edens and David Wise	September 23, 1995	S09E02
180	3	"The Wrath of Medusa"	David Wise	September 30, 1995	S09E03
181	4	"The New Mutation"	David Wise	October 7, 1995	S09E04
182	5	"The Showdown"	David Wise	October 14, 1995	S09E05
183	6	"Split-Second"	David Wise	October 21, 1995	S09E06
184	7	"Carter, the Enforcer"	David Wise	October 28, 1995	S09E07
185	8	"Doomquest"	David Wise	November 4, 1995	S09E08

=== Season 10 (1996) ===
- All eight tenth-season episodes were directed by Tony Love and written by Jeffrey Scott.

No. overall	No. in season	Title	Original release date	TV broadcast
186	1	"The Return of Dregg"	September 14, 1996	S10E01
187	2	"The Beginning of the End"	September 21, 1996	S10E02
188	3	"The Power of Three"	September 28, 1996	S10E03
189	4	"A Turtle in Time"	October 5, 1996	S10E04
190	5	"Turtles to the Second Power"	October 12, 1996	S10E05
191	6	"Mobster from Dimension X"	October 19, 1996	S10E06
192	7	"The Day the Earth Disappeared"	October 26, 1996	S10E07
193	8	"Divide and Conquer"	November 2, 1996	S10E08

=== Specials (1990–2017) ===
No.	Title	Directed by	Written by	Original air date	Prod. code	US viewers (millions)
S1	"Cartoon All-Stars to the Rescue"	Directed by: Milton Gray, Marsh Lamore, Bob Shellhorn, Mike Svayko; Supervising director: Karen Peterson	Duane Poole and Tom Swale	April 21, 1990	N/A	N/A
Michael is a young teenage boy who is using marijuana and stealing his father's beer. His younger sister, Corey, is constantly worried about him because he started acting differently. When her piggy bank goes missing, her cartoon tie-in toys come to life to help her find it. After discovering it in Michael's room along with his stash of drugs, the cartoon characters proceed to work together and take him on a fantasy journey to teach him the risks and consequences a life of drug abuse can bring.: Michaelangelo is among the cartoon characters.
S2	"Turtles Forever"	Roy Burdine and Lloyd Goldfine	Rob David, Matthew Drdek, and Lloyd Goldfine	November 21, 2009 (The CW4Kids)	N/A	N/A
When the 1987 version of the Turtles are accidentally brought to the universe of the 2003 series, the old Turtles must ally with the new to stop Ch'rell, the 2003 Utrom Shredder, whose evil plan of revenge for his exile threatens the existence of the very omniverse itself of Teenage Mutant Ninja Turtles everywhere. Fortunately, he is double-crossed by his own adopted daughter, Karai, who aids the Turtles.: Turtles Forever celebrates the 25th anniversary of the TMNT franchise.
S3	"The Manhattan Project" "Wormquake!"	Michael Chang	Brandon Auman	March 14, 2014 (Nickelodeon)	213 (TMNT 2012)	2.36
The Turtles from the universe of the 2012 series discover the existence of the 1987 series universe, and their counterparts there. Tiger Claw ends up on the Earth of the 1987 series.
S4	"Trans-Dimensional Turtles"	Alan Wan	Brandon Auman	March 27, 2016 (Nickelodeon)	410 (TMNT 2012)	1.53
The 2012 turtles are transported to a parallel universe, where they meet their counterparts and together they battle Kraang Subprime and 80s Krang. Both the Donatellos go to the original Mirage comics universe, but only for a short time.
S5	"Wanted: Bebop & Rocksteady"	Rie Koga	Peter Di Cicco	November 12, 2017 (Nickelodeon)	512 (Tales of the TMNT)	1.36
When the '87 series version of Krang and the Shredder appear in the 2012 dimension, they employ the '12 Bebop and Rocksteady, and find their plans succeeding better than ever. Meanwhile, the 1987 series versions of the Ninja Turtles seeks help from the '12 Ninja Turtles, April O'Neil and Casey Jones to stop both Krang and Shredder.
S6	"The Foot Walks Again!"	Sebastian Montes	Mark Henry	November 12, 2017 (Nickelodeon)	513 (Tales of the TMNT)	1.36
The Turtles must train their '87 counterparts to face a greater threat than they've ever encountered while April and Casey seeks help from Karai and Shinigami to track down Bebop and Rocksteady and discover '87 Shredder and Krang's dangerous scheme to take over both the 1987 and 2012 universes.
S7	"The Big Blowout"	Alan Wan	Jed MacKay	November 12, 2017 (Nickelodeon)	514 (Tales of the TMNT)	1.36
The Ninja Turtles (with the aid of April, Casey, Karai, Shinigami) enlist the help of the Mighty Mutanimals to stop '87 Krang and the Shredder from destroying '12 dimension, with a little help from the unlikeliest of mutants.

== DVD releases ==
English-language DVD releases of the original Ninja Turtles series are handled by Lions Gate Entertainment. All episodes from seasons 1–10 have been released in North America, including the "Vacation in Europe" sideseason. In the UK, only seasons 1 and 2 have been released in their entirety, alongside several compilation discs. Australia have received the complete seasons 1–4, not including the "Vacation" sideseason. These discs were released in NTSC format, despite PAL being standard for the region. In Germany, KSM Film has released every episode from seasons 1–10, including the "Vacation" sideseason. These releases feature the German audio track, while seasons 1–7 also include the original English audio.

=== Region 1 (United States of America and Canada) ===
- Teenage Mutant Ninja Turtles – Volume 1 (April 20, 2004)

Single disc containing all 5 episodes from season 1, plus 4 bonus episodes from season 10.

- Teenage Mutant Ninja Turtles – Volume 2 (April 26, 2005)

Single disc containing all 13 episodes from season 2.

- Teenage Mutant Ninja Turtles – Volume 3 (December 6, 2005)

Single disc containing episodes 1–12 from season 3.

- Teenage Mutant Ninja Turtles – Volume 4 (April 4, 2006)

Single disc containing episodes 13–24 from season 3.

- Teenage Mutant Ninja Turtles – Volume 5 (August 29, 2006)

Single disc containing episodes 25–36 from season 3.

- Teenage Mutant Ninja Turtles – Volume 6 (December 5, 2006)

Single disc containing episodes 37–47 from season 3, plus episode 1 from season 4.

- Teenage Mutant Ninja Turtles – Season Four (March 13, 2007)

5-disc set containing 40 episodes from season 4.

Note: This release skips over the season finale, "Once Upon a Time Machine". It was later released with season 10.

- Teenage Mutant Ninja Turtles – Season 5 (August 7, 2007)

3-disc set containing episodes 1–20 from season 5.

Note: This release skips over the two-part episode "Planet of the Turtleoids". It was later released with season 10.

- Teenage Mutant Ninja Turtles – Season 6 (April 8, 2008)

2-disc set containing all 16 episodes from season 6.

- Teenage Mutant Ninja Turtles – Season 7 Part 1: The Leonardo Slice (May 12, 2009)

Single disc containing episodes 1–6 from the "Vacation in Europe" sideseason, packaged with a free Leonardo action figure.

- Teenage Mutant Ninja Turtles – Season 7 Part 2: The Michelangelo Slice (May 12, 2009)

Single disc containing episodes 7–13 from the "Vacation in Europe" sideseason, packaged with a free Michelangelo action figure.

- Teenage Mutant Ninja Turtles – Season 7 Part 3: The Donatello Slice (May 12, 2009)

Single disc containing episodes 1–7 from season 7, packaged with a free Donatello action figure.

- Teenage Mutant Ninja Turtles – Season 7 Part 4: The Raphael Slice (May 12, 2009)

Single disc containing episodes 8–14 from season 7, packaged with a free Raphael action figure.

- Teenage Mutant Ninja Turtles – The Complete Season 8 (September 1, 2009)

Single disc containing all 8 episodes from season 8.

- Teenage Mutant Ninja Turtles – The Complete Season 7 Set (November 3, 2009)

4-disc set containing all 13 episodes from the "Vacation" sideseason, plus all 14 episodes from season 7.

- Teenage Mutant Ninja Turtles – The Complete Season 9 (August 16, 2011)

Single disc containing all 8 episodes from season 9.

- Teenage Mutant Ninja Turtles – The Complete Season 10 (August 14, 2012)

Single disc containing all 8 episodes from season 10, plus an episode held over from season 4 and two episodes held over from Season 5.

- Teenage Mutant Ninja Turtles – The Complete Classic Series Collection (November 13, 2012 ; June 12, 2018 first re-release; October 15, 2024 second re-release)

23-disc set including all 193 episodes from seasons 1–10, including the "Vacation" sideseason, the 2012 release is packaged in a collectable plastic box molded to resemble to the Turtle Van.

- Teenage Mutant Ninja Turtles – The Complete Season 3 (July 23, 2013)

4-disc set containing all 47 episodes from season 3.

Note: This release is just a re-packaged volumes 3–6 as Season 3.

- Teenage Mutant Ninja Turtles – Cowabunga Classics (July 29, 2014)

Single disc containing 10 fan-favorite episodes as chosen by a poll on TV.com.

- Teenage Mutant Ninja Turtles – Volume 5 & 6 (October 20, 2015)

Note: 2-Disc set containing episodes 25-48 from season 3.

- Teenage Mutant Ninja Turtles – Volume 1 & 2 (April 21, 2016)

2-Disc set containing all 18 episodes from season 1 & 2.

- Teenage Mutant Ninja Turtles – Volume 3 & 4 (April 21, 2016)

2-Disc set containing episodes 1-24 from season 3.

- Teenage Mutant Ninja Turtles – Seasons 5 & 6 (April 21, 2016)

4-Disc set containing all 34 episodes from seasons 5 & 6.

- Teenage Mutant Ninja Turtles – Seasons 7 & 8 (April 21, 2016)

5-Disc set containing all 35 episodes from seasons 7 & 8.

- Teenage Mutant Ninja Turtles – Seasons 9 & 10 (April 21, 2016)

2-Disc set containing all 18 episodes from seasons 9 & 10.

=== Region 2 ===
==== United Kingdom ====
- Teenage Mutant Ninja Turtles – The Original TV Series: 25th Anniversary Collector's Edition (May 25, 2009)

3-disc set containing all 18 episodes from seasons 1 and 2, plus 4 bonus episodes from season 10.

- Teenage Mutant Ninja Turtles – 3 'Turtally' Awesome Episodes from the Original TV Series (May 25, 2009)

Single disc containing episodes 1–3 from season 1.

- Teenage Mutant Ninja Turtles – The Best of Leonardo (May 19, 2014)

Single disc containing 3 episodes.

- Teenage Mutant Ninja Turtles – The Best of Michelangelo (May 19, 2014)

Single disc containing 3 episodes.

- Teenage Mutant Ninja Turtles – The Best of Donatello (May 19, 2014)

Single disc containing 3 episodes.

- Teenage Mutant Ninja Turtles – The Best of Raphael (May 19, 2014)

Single disc containing 3 episodes.

- Teenage Mutant Ninja Turtles – Cowabunga Classics (September 22, 2014)

Single disc containing 10 fan-favorite episodes as chosen by a poll on TV.com.

==== Germany ====
- Teenage Mutant Hero Turtles – DVD Collection (July 26, 2007)

5-disc set containing all 24 episodes from seasons 8, 9 and 10.

Note: This is the only German release of the series to date that does not contain the English audio track.

- Teenage Mutant Ninja Turtles – Box 1 (March 12, 2009)

5-disc set containing all 5 episodes from season 1, all 13 episodes from season 2, plus episodes 1–7 from season 3.

- Teenage Mutant Ninja Turtles – Box 2 (May 3, 2010)

5-disc set containing episodes 8–32 from season 3.

- Teenage Mutant Ninja Turtles – Box 3 (July 12, 2010)

6-disc set containing episodes 33–47 from season 3, episodes 1–2 from season 4, plus all 13 episodes from the "Vacation" sideseason.

- Teenage Mutant Ninja Turtles – Box 4 (October 17, 2011)

6-disc set containing episodes 3–32 from season 4.

- Teenage Mutant Ninja Turtles – Box 5 (December 5, 2011)

6-disc set containing episodes 33–39 from season 4, plus all 22 episodes from season 5 and the first episode from season 6.

- Teenage Mutant Ninja Turtles – Box 6 (February 20, 2012)

6-disc set containing episodes 2–16 from season 6 and all of the regular season 7.

- Teenage Mutant Ninja Turtles – Gesamtedition (November 29, 2013)

22-disc set containing all 169 episodes from seasons 1–7, including the "Vacation" sideseason.

=== Region 4 (Australia) ===
Note: Some of these weblinks give inaccurate information.

- Teenage Mutant Ninja Turtles – Volume 1 (March 11, 2009)

Single disc containing all 5 episodes from season 1, plus 4 bonus episodes from season 10.

- Teenage Mutant Ninja Turtles – Volume 2 (March 11, 2009)

Single disc containing all 13 episodes from season 2.

- Teenage Mutant Ninja Turtles – Volume 3 (March 11, 2009)

Single disc containing episodes 1–12 from season 3.

- Teenage Mutant Ninja Turtles – Volume 4 (June 3, 2009)

Single disc containing episodes 13–24 from season 3.

- Teenage Mutant Ninja Turtles – Volume 5 (June 3, 2009)

Single disc containing episodes 25–36 from season 3.

- Teenage Mutant Ninja Turtles – Volume 6 (June 3, 2009)

Single disc containing episodes 37–47 from season 3, plus episode 1 from season 4.

- Teenage Mutant Ninja Turtles – Volume 7 (September 9, 2009)

Single disc containing episodes 2–14 from season 4.

- Teenage Mutant Ninja Turtles – Volume 8 (September 9, 2009)

Single disc containing episodes 15–27 from season 4.

- Teenage Mutant Ninja Turtles – Volume 9 (September 9, 2009)

Single disc containing episodes 28–40 from season 4.

== VHS release ==
=== Region 1 (United States of America and Canada) ===
- Teenage Mutant Ninja Turtles: The Starchild (July 18, 1995)
- Teenage Mutant Ninja Turtles: The Legend of Koji (July 18, 1995)
- Teenage Mutant Ninja Turtles: Convicts from Dimension X (July 18, 1995)
- Teenage Mutant Ninja Turtles: Shredder Triumphant (July 18, 1995)

=== Region 2 ===
==== (United Kingdom) ====
TBA

==== (Germany) ====
TBA

=== Region 4 (Australia & New Zealand) ===
TBA

== See also ==
- List of Teenage Mutant Ninja Turtles (2003) episodes
- List of Teenage Mutant Ninja Turtles (2012) episodes
