= Teenage Mutant Ninja Turtles (2012 TV series) season 4 =

Teenage Mutant Ninja Turtles
- Season 4
- Showrunner: Ciro Nieli
- Starring: Seth Green; Rob Paulsen; Sean Astin; Greg Cipes
- No. of episodes: 26

Release
- Original network: Nickelodeon
- Original release: October 25, 2015 – February 26, 2017

Season chronology
- ← Previous; Season 3 Next → Season 5

The fourth season of the 2012 Teenage Mutant Ninja Turtles series began airing on Nickelodeon on October 25, 2015, in the United States. The season was ordered on June 17, 2014.

The four final episodes originally aired in South Korea during mid- and late-December 2016. This is the only season of the series that has aired over traditional two standard TV seasons, as well as the only season of the series where the 2-part finale aired in separate weeks.

== Plot ==
The Fugitoid rescues the Turtles, April, and Casey and takes them onto his spacecraft, the Ulixes, shortly before the Triceraton empire destroys Earth with a black hole generator. The Fugitoid takes the Turtles back in time six months earlier so that they can prevent the Triceratons from destroying Earth once more. Besides fighting the Triceratons, the Turtles also face new enemies in outer space like Lord Vringath Dregg of the planet Sectoid 1 and the bounty hunter Armaggon. The turtles also meet new allies, Commander G'Throkka (Sal Commander) and Lieutenant Y'Gythba (Mona Lisa), and even have an adventure with their interdimensional 1987 series counterparts and their enemy Krang, who is an exiled relative of Kraang Subprime. Despite the efforts of the Turtles, the Triceratons are still able to collect all three pieces of the Black Hole Generator, only for the Turtles to return to Earth and join forces with their past selves to warn Splinter before he is killed by Shredder, stop the detonator of the Heart of Darkness, and defeat the Triceratons. The Fugitoid destroys the Black Hole Generator near the Triceraton space fleet, causing it to explode, presumably killing the Triceratons. In the aftermath of the fight against the Triceratons, the past versions of the Turtles, April, and Casey leave Earth with the past Fugitoid in the Ulixes while the present Fugitoid's head is shown to be active and intact.

At one point during their adventures throughout the cosmos, April is given a fragment of the ancient Aeon's mystical Sol Star (containing the very essence of power and life itself), and which helps her in further developing her psychic abilities as well as drastically increasing them to incalculable levels; also due to the several training sessions she had with the Fugitoid.

Weeks later following the Triceraton Invasion being thwarted and the Foot Clan's disappearance, April is promoted to kunoichi at the time when the witch Shinigami arrives and it is revealed Karai is back, She was her friend before brain worm was vanished and intends to rebuild the Foot Clan and dispose of Shredder who is still recuperating from his last fight with Splinter. While Karai and Shinigami have some ninjas on their side, the Foot Clan strengthens the Footbot army by creating the Elite Footbots. Furthermore, some other crime organizations have been plotting to take over the Foot Clan's territory, and a crystal fragment of immeasurable mystical power (which April had received from an ancient benevolent race of aliens known as the Aeons) is beginning to exert quite a baneful influence on her. However, she eventually succeeds in overcoming its vast mystical power and shatters it. She then apologizes to her friends for not disregarding the universal influence the Sol Star fragment had on her, but assures everyone that she now has a better understand of how to control her increasingly powerful psychic abilities.

Using a special mutagen formula, Shredder recuperates and becomes the Super Shredder in order to take back control of the Foot Clan from Karai, finish off Splinter and the Turtles, and even goes far enough to inject more unstable mutagen into himself. He ends up killing Splinter by stabbing him and throwing him off the building. Super Shredder is thrown into a garbage truck to be left for dead by Casey and April. However, he survives and begins to hunt the Turtles once again. Having had enough, the Turtles decide to end the long feud once and for all. After many obstacles, the Turtles face against Shredder, and Leonardo ends it by killing him.

With Splinter avenged and Shredder dead, the Turtles and their allies face an uncertain future. Although the Foot clan remains active and other enemies are still at large, the heroes prepare to continue their fight, carrying Splinter's memory with them.

== Production ==
After appearing in the two-part season 2 episode "The Manhattan Project", the 1987 series counterparts of the turtles appear in the episode "Trans-Dimensional Turtles". Cam Clarke, Rob Paulsen, Townsend Coleman, Barry Gordon, and Pat Fraley reprise their roles as Leonardo, Raphael, Michelangelo Donatello, and Krang from the 1987 series.

== Episodes ==
No. overall	No. in season	Title	Directed by	Written by	Storyboarded by	Original release date (Note: "Tokka vs. the World" and "Tale of Tiger Claw" first aired on December 17, 2016 in South Korea. Requiem and Owari first aired on December 30, 2016 in South Korea.)	Prod. code	US viewers (millions)
79	1	"Beyond the Known Universe"	Alan Wan	Brandon Auman	Rie Koga, Ben Li and Sheldon Vella	October 25, 2015	401	1.62
Following the destruction of Earth and Splinter's being killed by Shredder, the Turtles, April, and Casey travel back in time with a cyborg extraterrestrial scientist known as the Fugitoid to six months earlier to stop the Triceratons from collecting all the parts to the black hole generator and destroy Earth. They are pursued by the villainous ruler of the planet Sectoid, Lord Vrinigath Dregg, after crossing paths with him while stopping at a spaceport for repairs.
80	2	"The Moons of Thalos 3"	Michael Chang	John Shirley	JJ Conway, Adam Lucas and Ed Tadem	November 1, 2015	402	1.66
Traveling inside their spacecraft, the Turtles, April, Casey, and the Fugitoid are shot down by the Triceratons and are stranded on an icy moon. As they try to escape, they come across two of the Newtralizer's people, the Salamandarians, one of which Raphael develops a crush on and nicknames "Mona Lisa".
81	3	"The Weird World of Wyrm"	Sebastian Montes	Randolph Heard	Miki Brewster, George Gipson and Samuel Montes	November 8, 2015	403	1.60
While investigating a wrecked spacecraft, the Turtles, April, Casey, and the Fugitoid find a hypercube containing the creature Wyrm, who grants them three wishes.
82	4	"The Outlaw Armaggon"	Alan Wan	Gavin Hignight	Rie Koga, Ben Li and Sheldon Vella	November 15, 2015	404	1.41
When Lord Dregg hires a cyborg bounty hunter shark named Armaggon to destroy the Turtles, the team flees to an abandoned space station. However, they soon face another threat in the form of the station's autonomous artificial intelligence system, Overmind.
83	5	"Riddle of the Ancient Aeons"	Michael Chang	Brandon Auman	JJ Conway, Adam Lucas and Ed Tadem	January 10, 2016	405	1.62
The Turtles, the Fugitoid, April, and Casey must journey through an ancient alien temple to get a fragment of the black hole generator before the Triceratons do or the planet's landscape drives them insane with hatred.
84	6	"Journey to the Center of Mikey's Mind"	Sebastian Montes	Todd Casey	Miki Brewster, George Gipson and Samuel Montes	January 17, 2016	406	1.58
When microscopic aliens invade Mikey's mind, the Turtles have to chase them through the strange world of Mikey's subconscious, with the help of April and her psychic abilities.
85	7	"The Arena of Carnage"	Alan Wan	Peter Di Cicco	Rie Koga, Ben Li, Sarah Partington and Sheldon Vella	January 24, 2016	407	1.58
The Turtles are captured and thrown into the Triceratons' battle arena. Their only chance of escaping is teaming up with a convicted traitor while April and Casey work with the Fugitoid to free them.
86	8	"The War for Dimension X"	Michael Chang	Kevin Burke and Chris "Doc" Wyatt	JJ Conway, Adam Lucas and Ed Tadem	January 31, 2016	408	1.35
The Turtles must gain the trust of the Utrom Council (Queen, Rook, Bishop, and Pawn) in order to find the next piece of the black hole generator, where they learn the Utroms past, as well as the Kraang's.
87	9	"The Cosmic Ocean"	Sebastian Montes	Mark Henry	Miki Brewster, George Gipson and Samuel Montes	March 13, 2016	409	1.52
The Turtles journey through the cosmic ocean of Varuna in outer space, which is gravitationally bound together, where they must prove themselves worthy to Hiidalra, an aquatic alien queen who holds the second piece of the black hole generator.
88	10	"Trans-Dimensional Turtles"	Alan Wan	Brandon Auman	Rie Koga, Ben Li and Sheldon Vella	March 27, 2016	410	1.53
The Turtles are transported to a parallel universe, where they meet their counterparts, and together they battle Krang and Kraang Subprime.: This episode had an early screening at WonderCon on March 26, 2016, one day before its Nickelodeon broadcast date.
89	11	"Revenge of the Triceratons"	Michael Chang and Ben Jones	Randolph Heard	JJ Conway, Adam Lucas and Ed Tadem	April 3, 2016	411	1.45
Donatello is feeling inferior to the Fugitoid, but his intellect is put to the test when the Triceratons attack.
90	12	"The Evil of Dregg"	Sebastian Montes	Gavin Hignight	Miki Brewster, George Gipson and Samuel Montes	April 10, 2016	412	1.70
When Raphael loses his fighting mojo after seemingly being betrayed by Mona Lisa on Sectoid 1, he must overcome his feelings to save his brothers from certain doom at the hands of Lord Dregg and Armaggon.
91	13	"The Ever-Burning Fire"	Alan Wan	John Shirley	Rie Koga, Ben Li, Sarah Partington and Sheldon Vella	April 17, 2016	413	1.40
The Turles must overcome impossible odds like the Triceratons and Lord Dregg in order to obtain the final Black Hole Generator piece that is located on the lava planet of Magdomar, guarded by the cosmic alligator snapping turtle-like beast Tokka. In the end, they lose all three pieces and Mozar calls them at the end saying they are going to use the black hole generator on Earth.
92	14	"Earth's Last Stand"	Michael Chang and Ben Jones	Brandon Auman	JJ Conway, Adam Lucas and Ed Tadem	April 24, 2016	414	1.64
As the team finally reaches Earth, the Fugitoid reveals a horrible secret about his past. He reveals that he was the creator of the Heart of Darkness. At the end of the episode, the turtles warn Splinter about Shredder's betrayal, while Fugitoid flies himself and his spacecraft into the Triceraton mothership along with the Heart of Darkness to destroy it; taking the Triceratons and himself down with it. The Turtles, April and Casey mourn his ultimate sacrifice for their world. However, at the end of the episode, his head reactivates in the Triceraton rubble.
93	15	"City at War"	Sebastian Montes	Brandon Auman	Miki Brewster, George Gipson and Samuel Montes	August 14, 2016	415	1.51
Weeks after the Triceratons were stopped, the Turtles now celebrates April's full transition as a kunoichi. They find out Karai has returned and brain worm is gone because she vowed to restore the Foot Clan and undo the damage the Shredder has done to the Clan with the help of her old friend from Japan, Shinigami. It is revealed that Shredder is alive but gravely injured from the previous episode who now uses mutagen provided by Baxter Stockman to speed up his recovery and to further increase his strength.: This episode had an early sneak peek at Comic Con 2016.
94	16	"Broken Foot"	Alan Wan	Peter Di Cicco	Rie Koga, Ben Li and Sheldon Vella	August 21, 2016	416	1.46
When Leonardo secretly allies himself with Karai who now has Foot Soldiers of her own he gets himself into deeper danger than he could have realized, such as Donatello getting injured from explosives and the Turtles and Karai close to death in the Foot Soldier Factory. In the end Karai no longer wants to go after Shredder's belongings but she wants to go after Shredder himself.: Raphael mentions that he wanted to dress up like a vigilante called "Nightwatcher," a reference to his alter-ego in TMNT.; Leonardo's costume is a reference to the Foot Ninja outfit that he wore in Teenage Mutant Ninja Turtles when he was magically brainwashed by a witch Kitsume (in the City Falls saga) into believing that he worked for the Shredder.
95	17	"The Insecta Trifecta"	Michael Chang and Ben Jones	Kevin Burke and Chris "Doc" Wyatt	JJ Conway, Adam Lucas and Sarah Partington	August 28, 2016	417	1.40
Raphael must overcome his fear of insects to help the team when they are forced to battle Baxter Stockman's new insect minions Scumbug and Antrax, who have captured Casey Jones, April O'Neil, Leonardo and Karai, at the time when Shredder was recuperating.
96	18	"Mutant Gangland"	Sebastian Montes	Todd Casey	Miki Brewster, George Gipson and Samuel Montes	September 4, 2016	418	1.20
With the Shredder missing from the city, Don Vizioso desires to take over by having his gangster engineer highly advanced anti-mutant weapons that have been designed to incapacitate the Turtles and their fellow mutants. When Mondo Gecko and Donnie are abducted, it is up to Leo, Mikey, Raph, Slash, Leatherhead, and Dr. Rockwell to save them from being taken apart for the amusement of Don Vizioso. However, they must also deal with Don's strongest and most lethal of minions: Hammer.
97	19	"Bat in the Belfry"	Alan Wan	Eugene Son	Ben Jones, Jae Hong Kim, Rie Koga, Sheldon Vella and Alan Wan	September 11, 2016	419	1.47
Donnie experiments with April's crystalline fragment of the mystical Sol Star, but accidentally supercharges it with electricity that stirs sudden sentience and autonomy in the crystal fragment. It then uses this to bring four of the main characters from Mikey's favorite comic book to life. Mikey befriends the heroes Wingnut and Screwloose, and he and Casey join them in stopping crime. But when they tell the two superheroes that they are fictional characters and show them the Sol Star, it causes Wingnut and Screwloose to transform into insane monstrous forms. Meanwhile, Donatello becomes incessantly worried that the Sol Star fragment is affecting April's mental stability.
98	20	"The Super Shredder"	Rie Koga	Brandon Auman	JJ Conway, Adam Lucas, Sarah Partington and LeSean Thomas	November 6, 2016	420	1.47
For the first time, the Turtles encounter something they cannot defeat - the Super Shredder! Now far stronger and more vicious than ever, Shredder has returned to put an end to Splinter and the Turtles once and for all. He captures Karai and challenges Splinter to another duel to the death. Meanwhile, the Turtles and April have to deal with Tiger Claw, Rahzar, and Fishface. In the Undercity, the duel between Splinter and Super Shredder begins to heat up; particularly when Shredder's right arm begins to go out of control as a dangerous side effect of the highly unstable mutagen dosages Baxter Stockman had warned him of. The Turtles, April and Karai show up to assist Splinter, but are held up Chrome Domes. As Super Shredder prepares for the final blow, Splinter throws a knife at some smoke bombs, which causes the ledge to crumble and collapse, resulting in them falling into the abyss below; presumably to their deaths.: This episode had an early showing at New York Comic Con 2016.
99	21	"Darkest Plight"	Sebastian Montes	Randolph Heard	Miki Brewster, George Gipson and Samuel Montes	November 13, 2016	421	1.26
The Turtles (along with April, Casey, and Karai) desperately hunt for Splinter, as Super Shredder is seen to have survived and has Bebop and Rocksteady make sure that Splinter is truly destroyed. Donnie, Mikey, Raph and Casey go to search the Undercity for Splinter with their grappling hooks; unaware that Bebop and Rocksteady are not far. Meanwhile Leo, Karai and April lure Tiger Claw and Super Shredder to the surface. Leo is separated from the two girls and left to battle Super Shredder all on his own. Fortunately, April uses her extraordinarily powerful telekinetic abilities against Super Shredder and succeeds in saving Karai from being crushed by a truck that contains sulfuric acid (thanks to the mystical Sol Star fragment further amplifying her psionic abilities), her eyes glow a bright blue and she smiles malevolently as she hurls it right back at Super Shredder. In the depths of the Under-City, a gravely injured and weakened Splinter is shocked to find the Rat King, who wants him back under his control. But is revealed to have been nothing more than hallucinations due to his fever. He is then rescued by a joyous Donnie and Mikey. At his new lair, Super Shredder demands more mutagen, which Tiger Claw adamantly refuses to allow, as it will destroy his entire being. However, he forces Baxter Stockman to inject the remaining dosages of the unstable mutagen into his system as Tiger Claw watches in terror and fear.
100	22	"The Power Inside Her"	Alan Wan	Peter Di Cicco	Jae Hong Kim, Ben Li, Sheldon Vella and Alan Wan	November 20, 2016	422	1.21
Despite Leonardo's uncertainty, Donatello decides to do tests on April, but only ends up in further increasing her psionic abilities and being possessed by the corrupted spirit of an almighty elder Aeon from within the Sol Star fragment, by the name of Za-Naron. In the end, April succeeds in regaining control, putting an end to Za-Naron and breaking the Sol Star fragment. After recovering from the battle, April apologizes to her friends for not listening to them about the influence the crystal fragment had on her; particularly Donnie, who she nearly destroyed while under Za-Naron's control. She assures everyone that even though she can no longer harness the great mystical power of the Aeons, she now has a better understanding of how to control her psychic abilities.
101	23	"Tokka vs. the World"	Rie Koga	Gavin Hignight	JJ Conway, Adam Lucas and Sarah Partington	February 5, 2017	423	1.23
Tokka, who is shown to have survived the colossal implosion of the dwarf star in "The Ever-Burning Fire", returns and discovers that her baby boy (whom Raphael adopted as Chompy Picasso) is missing. Determined to get him back, she crash lands on Earth; leading up to an intense battle between her, the Earth Protection Force, and the Turtles who meet up with Bishop, who aids E.P.F. in advancing Earth's defenses against more extraterrestrial invasions. Raph manages to approach Tokka and explains that he only took her baby because he believed that she had perished, leaving Chompy motherless. Touched by this, Tokka leaves Chompy in Raph's care and returns to Magdomar. Splinter wonders what Raph will do once Chompy becomes full grown, to which Raph replies that he knows that Chompy is fated to return to the stars one day but will always look out for him until that day comes.: This episode aired in South Korea's Nickelodeon on December 17.
102	24	"Tale of Tiger Claw"	Sebastian Montes	Mark Henry	Miki Brewster, Ben Jones, George Gipson and Samuel Montes	February 12, 2017	424	1.17
A dangerous female assassin and fox-mutant, by the name of Alopex, appears who is bent on taking down her own brother, Tiger Claw, with the cursed Blades of Vengeance. The Turtles, April and Casey try to befriend her, but she turns on them and furiously goes after Tiger Claw alone, but not before she curses Casey with the blades. Unfortunately, for her, Tiger Claw has well prepared for her arrival. The Turtles make the scene and distract Tiger Claw while April uses her tanto to break the M.O.U.S.E.R. cage that traps her. In gratitude, Alopex returns one of the blades to Casey, and April uses her telekinetic abilities to borrow Tiger Claw's ice gun so Casey can destroy them, thus breaking their curse. Alopex pins Tiger Claw and seems prepared to kill him again but decides against it as it is not honorable. Tiger Claw shoots her from behind, but Alopex anticipates this and dodges the blast and slices off his right arm; an act that shocks even the Turtles. As Bebop and Rocksteady take Tiger Claw away, Alopex takes off to the city rooftops again.
103	25	"Requiem"	Alan Wan	Brandon Auman	Jae Hong Kim, Ben Li, Sheldon Vella, Sarah Partington and Alan Wan	February 19, 2017	425	1.01
The Mutagenic serum that Super Shredder was transformed by had been stabilized at last. Super Shredder is rid of his weaknesses and out for Splinter and the Turtles, willing to end them all. Super Shredder targets the Mutanimals's base in The Bronx where Karai is hiding and easily overpowers the combined forces of the Mutanimals and Karai, hospitalising the latter. The remaining forces of the Mutanimals and the Turtles split up to cover two different tracks by Splinter's command, much to Leo's worry. Leo, Donatello, Michelangelo and Leatherhead leave for Coney Island to face Shredder's mutant cronies leaving Splinter, Raphael, Casey Jones, April O'Neil and Slash to face the unrelenting Super Shredder atop the Wolf Hotel, where the Turtles first fought him. The Turtles and Leatherhead handle Shredder's henchmen with ease, even drowning Rahzar in the process. However, they discover that the fight with Shredder's henchmen was all a ruse to split them up. Back at the Wolf Hotel, the combined forces of Splinter and his allies stand their ground but are beaten by Super Shredder one by one. Splinter seemingly defeats Shredder by sending him off the building right as the remaining Turtles arrive. All seems well until Leo looks up in horror as the Super Shredder gets back up and stabs Splinter through the stomach, then tossing him onto the pavement below. Enraged, April unleashes a powerful blast of psychic energy to blow Super Shredder off the roof and plummet into a garbage truck, which Casey uses to seemingly kill him by turning on the compactor. The grieving Turtles then carry Splinter's body to the Shellraiser and depart to lay him to rest. Super Shredder's hand bursts through the top of the truck, still very much alive.
104	26	"Owari"	Rie Koga	Brandon Auman	JJ Conway, Adam Lucas and Sarah Partington	February 26, 2017	426	1.23
After Splinter is buried on the O'Neil farm, his spirit informs Leonardo that Super Shredder is still alive and needs to be stopped. Not wanting Super Shredder to go after their adoptive sister again or make the same attempt on April and Casey's families, The Turtles, April, and Casey ambush Shredder's hideout after finding out the location from the injured Karai. They defeat Super Shredder's henchmen, even turning Baxter Stockman back to normal in the process, before confronting Saki on the roof of the hideout. After Super Shredder knocks almost everyone off the building, Leonardo finally defeats the Shredder and decapitates him, finishing him off once and for all. The Turtles return to New York victorious as they prepare for the next imminent threat.
