= Tales of the Teenage Mutant Ninja Turtles (disambiguation) =

Tales of the Teenage Mutant Ninja Turtles may refer to:

- Tales of the Teenage Mutant Ninja Turtles, a comic book series published by Mirage Studios
- Teenage Mutant Ninja Turtles (2012 TV series), which was known as Tales of the Teenage Mutant Ninja Turtles in its fifth and final season
- Tales of the Teenage Mutant Ninja Turtles (TV series), a follow-up to the 2023 film Teenage Mutant Ninja Turtles: Mutant Mayhem

== See also ==
- Teenage Mutant Ninja Turtles (disambiguation)
