= Teenage Mutant Ninja Turtles (2013 video game) =

2013 video game

- Developer: Magic Pockets
- Publisher: Activision
- Producer: Xavier Marot
- Designer: Philippe Tesson
- Programmer: François Maingaud
- Writer: Brandon Auman
- Composer: Jeff Broadbent
- Series: Teenage Mutant Ninja Turtles
- Platforms: Nintendo 3DS, Wii, Xbox 360
- Release: NA: 22 October 2013; AU: 23 October 2013 (Nintendo 3DS and Xbox 360); EU: 25 October 2013
- Genre: Beat 'em up
- Mode: Single-player

Teenage Mutant Ninja Turtles is a 2013 video game published by Activision and developed by Magic Pockets, based on the 2012 Teenage Mutant Ninja Turtles TV series. It was the first video game to be based on the Nickelodeon show, featuring several villains from the show's first season. The digital versions of the game, alongside other Teenage Mutant Ninja Turtles games published by Activision, were pulled from all digital storefronts in January 2017 as they chose not to renew the license.

The Nintendo 3DS version was later bundled on a single cartridge with Teenage Mutant Ninja Turtles: Danger of the Ooze and was released as Teenage Mutant Ninja Turtles: Master Splinter's Training Pack on November 3, 2015, by Abstraction Games.

== Reception ==
Reception

Aggregate score
Aggregator	Score
Metacritic	(3DS) 50/100 (X360) 25/100

Review scores
Publication	Score
IGN	(3DS) 5/10
Nintendo Life	(3DS) 5/10
Official Xbox Magazine (UK)	(X360) 1/10

The game was given generally unfavorable reviews by critics and fans. The Xbox 360 version received very bad scores due to poor graphics, performance, and gameplay.

The Nintendo 3DS version received slightly better review scores in regards to its graphics on the system, but was still criticized for repetitive and uninspired gameplay. Scott Thompson, in his IGN review of the 3DS version, felt that while it had the same "strong writing and characterization of the Nickelodeon show", the gameplay was simply too short and repetitive to keep the interest of either younger or older players. He concluded though it was "decent choice for kids" the game didn't do enough to "cater to the show’s wide audience."
