= Teenage Mutant Ninja Turtles III (disambiguation) =

Teenage Mutant Ninja Turtles III may refer to any of the following Teenage Mutant Ninja Turtles (TMNT) related media:

- Teenage Mutant Ninja Turtles III, live-action film
- Teenage Mutant Ninja Turtles III: The Manhattan Project, Nintendo Entertainment System video game
- Teenage Mutant Ninja Turtles III: Radical Rescue, Game Boy video game
- Teenage Mutant Ninja Turtles 3: Mutant Nightmare, multi-platform video game
- Batman/Teenage Mutant Ninja Turtles III, comic book limited series
- Mighty Morphin Power Rangers/Teenage Mutant Ninja Turtles III, comic book limited series

== See also ==
- Teenage Mutant Ninja Turtles (disambiguation)
- Teenage Mutant Ninja Turtles II (disambiguation)
- Teenage Mutant Ninja Turtles IV (disambiguation)
