= Teenage Mutant Ninja Turtles (2012 TV series) season 5 =

Teenage Mutant Ninja Turtles
- Season 5
- Showrunner: Ciro Nieli
- Starring: Seth Green; Rob Paulsen; Sean Astin; Greg Cipes
- No. of episodes: 20

Release
- Original network: Nickelodeon (episodes 1–10; 18–20); Nicktoons (episodes 11–17)
- Original release: March 19 – November 12, 2017

Season chronology
- ← Previous; Season 4

The fifth and final season of the 2012 Teenage Mutant Ninja Turtles series, titled Tales of the Teenage Mutant Ninja Turtles, aired on Nickelodeon in the United States from March 19, 2017, to November 12, 2017, consisting of 20 episodes.

On January 11, 2018, the season became available at Hulu.

== Plot ==
Following Splinter's death and the Super Shredder's destruction at the hands of Leonardo, the Turtles, April O'Neil, Casey Jones and Karai have all moved on with their daily lives.

Leo takes on even more responsibility as sensei.

However, Tiger Claw and an underground cult dedicated to the Foot Clan have plans to bring back the Shredder, with the help of a Demodragon named Kavaxas.

In another dimension inhabited by anthropomorphic animals in Feudal Japan, a lone rabbit ronin named Miyamoto Usagi has been tasked with protecting an unpleasant Pug named Kintaro, the "Golden Child" of the Sky Buddha. Meanwhile, the wolf wizard Jei transports the turtles into his reality to serve as mind-controlled hitmen, to prevent Usagi from ever reaching the Temple of the Sky Buddha.

A flashback (prequel) shows how Splinter and the four Turtles, as babies, found their underground lair while being pursued by the Kraang.

Splinter realizes he has been given a second chance at fatherhood, and names the infant Turtles after his favorite Italian artists of the Renaissance. After Splinter tells the story to his sons (who are kids when they first hear the story), he gives them their signature weapons and prepares them for the next level of their ninja training.

In the alternate post-apocalyptic future, humanity and most of the mutant-kind have been wiped out after an extremely powerful and destructive mutagen bomb was triggered. An elderly, weathered version of Raphael and a robot containing Donatello's consciousness scour a wasteland that was once their home in New York City. They encounter a meerkat named Mira who is hunted by a honey badger named Verminator Rex and his gang of bikers. Mira reveals a map imprinted on her arm that leads to a haven called "the Green Paradise" or "Oasis".

It is later revealed that the Newtralizer is working with Lord Dregg, who has cheated death and sworn revenge on the Turtles. Raphael's Salamandrian girlfriend, Mona Lisa, and their friend, Sal Commander, arrive on Earth asking the Turtles for help finding the Newtralizer, a Salamandrian bounty hunter who nearly killed Sal Commander at one point and seeks to destroy the Utroms.

During Halloween, the Turtles and their time-traveling ally, Renet, are reunited with their enemy, Savanti Romero as he plans to turn all of New York City into a monster-filled dystopia while sending them back in time at Transylvania, during the age of Count Dracula and 1810s Central Europe where Victor Frankenstein creates his infamous monster.

The Turtles once again meet their counterparts from the 1987 series. The 1987 versions of the Shredder and Krang have fled to the 2012 reality and seek help from the 2012 versions of Bebop and Rocksteady as they plan to conquer both dimensions. The Mighty Mutanimals are later enlisted by the Turtles to help stop the villains.

== Production ==
On July 10, 2015, Nickelodeon ordered a fifth season of Teenage Mutant Ninja Turtles. The first four episodes were released to DVD on March 21, 2017, two days after the TV-premiere.

On March 2, 2017, Nickelodeon announced that season five would be the show's final season. It was renamed Tales of the Teenage Mutant Ninja Turtles for this last season, and its opening titles were changed.

"The Wasteland Warrior, "The Impossible Desert", and "Carmageddon!" are typically presented as a television film, Raphael: Mutant Apocalypse.

Although these episodes were not the last to air, and not officially considered canon by Nickelodeon, they were the last episodes produced. In an interview, executive producer Ciro Nieli revealed that he intended for these episodes to be the series finale in order to prevent any alteration of the timeline that he and the rest of the crew had built, despite the episodes' contradictions to previously established canon (most notably Renet's description of the future from the Season 3 episode "Turtles in Time").

Nickelodeon ultimately aired the episodes (and their film compilation) on Nicktoons in the middle of the season, marketing "Wanted: Bebop and Rocksteady" as the series finale instead.

== Episodes ==
No. overall	No. in season	Title	Directed by	Written by	Storyboarded by	Original release date (Note: Raphael: Mutant Apocalypse, "The Curse of Savanti Romero", "The Crypt of Dracula", "The Frankenstein Experiment", and "Monsters Among Us" all aired originally on Nicktoons instead of Nickelodeon.)	Prod. code	USA viewers (millions)
105	1	"Scroll of the Demodragon"	Sebastian Montes	Randolph Heard	Miki Brewster, George Gipson and Samuel Montes	March 19, 2017	501	1.01
Despite the Turtles victory against the Shredder, the Foot Clan has been reborn as an underground cult led by Tiger Claw. As he plans to resurrect the Super Shredder with the aid of the mighty demodragon, Kavaxas, who Mikey nicknames Hot-Head.
106	2	"The Forgotten Swordsman"	Alan Wan	Peter Di Cicco	Ben Jones, Sheldon Vella and Alan Wan	March 26, 2017 (Note: This episode was first released in Super Shredder DVD on March 21, 2017.)	502	0.99
When Karai became the rightful heiress of the Foot Clan, her old teacher, Hattori Tatsu, seeks rightful ownership by hunting the Shredder's legendary helmet, the Kuro Kabuto. Unfortunately, Tiger Claw and his lackeys are also in search of the Kabuto, as it is one of the essential items required for Kavaxas to return the Super Shredder to life.
107	3	"Heart of Evil"	Rie Koga	Gavin Hignight	JJ Conway, Adam Lucas and Sarah Partington	April 2, 2017	503	1.12
Donatello's grudge with Don Vizioso threatens the Turtles' newest mission: To retrieve the heart of the Super Shredder, which is in the possession of Don Vizioso himself.
108	4	"End Times"	Sebastian Montes	Brandon Auman	Miki Brewster, George Gipson and Samuel Montes	April 9, 2017	504	1.14
Kavaxas reveals his treachery, freeing himself from the Seal of the Ancients and releasing an army of Ghosts onto the world, including Ho Chan. Now it's up to the Turtles, Karai, Leatherhead, and the ghost of Splinter to stop him.
109	5	"Lone Rat and Cubs"	Alan Wan	Kevin Eastman	Ben Jones, Christine Liu, Sheldon Vella, Alan Wan and Jessica Zammit	August 13, 2017	505	1.06
When Splinter is mutated into a sewer rat, he must learn to survive the life of a mutant on the run while protecting 4 infant mutant turtles from the Kraang. Note: It is a flashback set before the events of "Rise of the Turtles".
110	6	"The Curse of Savanti Romero"	Rie Koga	Peter Di Cicco	JJ Conway, Adam Lucas and Sarah Partington	September 27, 2017	506	N/A
The Turtles' plans to enjoy Halloween are put on hold when strange monsters threaten to transform New York City.
111	7	"The Crypt of Dracula"	Sebastian Montes	John Shirley	Miki Brewster, George Gipson and Samuel Montes	September 27, 2017	507	N/A
Renet transports the Ninja Turtles to Transylvania to stop Savanti Romero from recruiting Count Dracula.
112	8	"The Frankenstein Experiment"	Alan Wan	Brandon Auman	Ben Jones, Sheldon Vella and Alan Wan	October 4, 2017	508	N/A
Savanti recruits Frankenstein's monster and will soon unleash his creatures on the 21st century.
113	9	"Monsters Among Us"	Rie Koga	Kevin Burke and Chris "Doc" Wyatt	JJ Conway, Adam Lucas and Sarah Partington	October 11, 2017	509	N/A
When Renet and the Turtles return to a world run by monsters, they realize they have made the situation even worse.
114	10	"When Worlds Collide"	Sebastian Montes and Alan Wan	Todd Casey and Elliott Casey; Eugene Son	Miki Brewster, Ben Jones, Christine Liu, Samuel Montes, Sheldon Vella, Alan Wan and Jessica Zammit	June 18, 2017	510	0.91
115	11	"When Worlds Collide"	Sebastian Montes and Alan Wan	Todd Casey and Elliott Casey; Eugene Son	Miki Brewster, Ben Jones, Christine Liu, Samuel Montes, Sheldon Vella, Alan Wan and Jessica Zammit	June 18, 2017	511	0.91
The Newtralizer returns to New York City, more powerful than ever before, and joins forces with a dangerous and unexpected ally in Lord Dregg. With the help of Mona Lisa and Sal Commander, the Turtles fight back to defend their city.
116	12	"Wanted: Bebop & Rocksteady"	Rie Koga	Peter Di Cicco	N/A	November 12, 2017 (Note: This episode was first released in Wanted Bebop and Rocksteady DVD on September 12, 2017.)	512	0.96
When the 1987 series version of the Shredder and Krang appear in the 2012 Ninja Turtles' dimension, they employ the present Bebop and Rocksteady, and find their plans succeeding better than ever. Meanwhile, the 1987 series versions of the Ninja Turtles seeks help from the present Ninja Turtles, April O'Neil and Casey Jones to stop both Krang and Shredder.
117	13	"The Foot Walks Again!"	Sebastian Montes	Mark Henry	N/A	November 12, 2017	513	0.96
The Turtles must train their 1987 series counterparts to face a greater threat than they've ever encountered while April and Casey seeks help from Karai and Shinigami to track down Bebop and Rocksteady and discover 1987 series Shredder and Krang's dangerous scheme to take over both the 1987 and 2012 universes.
118	14	"The Big Blowout"	Alan Wan	Jed MacKay	N/A	November 12, 2017	514	0.96
The Ninja Turtles (with the aid of April, Casey, Karai, Shinigami) enlist the help of the Mighty Mutanimals to stop 1987 series Krang and Shredder from destroying the 2012 series Earth, with a little help from the unlikeliest of mutants.
119	15	"Yojimbo"	Rie Koga	Stan Sakai	JJ Conway, Adam Lucas and Sarah Partington	July 23, 2017	515	0.99
The Ninja Turtles are transported to an alternate dimension, where they befriend the Samurai Rabbit and fierce master swordsman, Miyamoto Usagi.
120	16	"Osoroshi no Tabi"	Sebastian Montes	Brandon Auman	Miki Brewster, Christopher Luc, Samuel Montes and Aeri Yoon	July 30, 2017	516	0.93
Usagi leads the Turtles through a haunted forest, where they end up encountering mischievous and highly dangerous spirits.
121	17	"Kagayake! Kintaro"	Alan Wan	Henry Gilroy	Ben Jones, Christine Liu, Sheldon Vella, Alan Wan and Jessica Zammit	August 6, 2017	517	0.97
As they reach their destination, Usagi and the Turtles must help young Kintaro fulfill his destiny.
Raphael: Mutant Apocalypse
122	18	"The Wasteland Warrior"	Rie Koga	Brandon Auman	Miki Brewster and JJ Conway	September 22, 2017	518	N/A
In an alternate post-apocalyptic future, all humans and most of the mutant population have been wiped out due to an extremely powerful mutagen bomb. Only a weathered version of Raphael, who has lost most of his childhood memories, and Donatello (whose consciousness has been transferred into Metalhead) have been traveling throughout the Impossible Wasteland trying to stay alive while being pursued by Verminator Rex and his honey badger ravagers. They befriend a female meerkat warrior named Mira, the last of her tribe. She harbors the secret to "Paradise" and is looking for a wise turtle called "the Holy Chalupa."
123	19	"The Impossible Desert"	Sebastian Montes	Peter Di Cicco	Ben Jones, Christine Liu and Christopher Luc	September 22, 2017	519	N/A
Raphael, Donatello and Mira continue to be trapped by constant sandstorms throughout the desert, but are saved by none other than Chompy Picasso, who has grown considerably over the decades. On their way, they manage to find "the Holy Chalupa" who is, in truth, an elderly thin Michelangelo. He takes them to his home, an old pizza shop, where Ice Cream Kitty waits. While the three Turtles are catching up and trying to accept the loss of their leader and eldest brother Leonardo, they are all attacked by Verminator Rex who has become allied with Imperius Reptilicus and reptilian Scale Tail Clan. The villains manage to abduct Mira, but is followed by an angry Raphael.
124	20	"Carmageddon!"	Alan Wan	Gavin Hignight	Adam Lucas and Samuel Montes	September 22, 2017	520	N/A
Still trapped in "the Pit", Raphael manages to defeat his two opponents and is hailed as leader of both tribes by the crowd.Aided by Mira, Mikey, Donnie and Chompy, they flee in search of "the Green Paradise", but they are forced to confront Maximus Kong, the evil leader of the Wasteland. In a shocking revelation, Raphael learns that Maximus Kong is Leonardo. A flashback reveals that the Mutagen bomb caused him to undergo a second mutation, resulting in memory loss and insanity. But, Raphael's love for his brother frees Leonardo from his rage and helps him to regain his memories. All four brothers are reunited and arrive at "the Green Paradise" (also known as the Oasis) with Mira. A shot shows the four Turtles and Splinter taking a picture together. This is followed by Leonardo holding a picket sign in dedication to the creators of the Teenage Mutant Ninja Turtles franchise, Kevin Eastman and Peter Laird.
