= Teenage Mutant Ninja Turtles II (disambiguation) =

Teenage Mutant Ninja Turtles II: The Secret of the Ooze is a 1991 film.

Teenage Mutant Ninja Turtles II may also refer to:

- Teenage Mutant Ninja Turtles II: The Arcade Game, the 1990 NES port of the original Teenage Mutant Ninja Turtles arcade game
- Teenage Mutant Ninja Turtles II: Back from the Sewers, a 1991 Game Boy video game
- Teenage Mutant Ninja Turtles 2: Battle Nexus, a 2004 video game
- Teenage Mutant Ninja Turtles: Out of the Shadows, a 2016 film

== See also ==
- Batman/Teenage Mutant Ninja Turtles II, a 2018 comic book limited series
- Mighty Morphin Power Rangers/Teenage Mutant Ninja Turtles II, a 2022–2023 comic book limited series
- Teenage Mutant Ninja Turtles (disambiguation)
- Teenage Mutant Ninja Turtles III (disambiguation)
- Teenage Mutant Ninja Turtles IV (disambiguation)
