= Teenage Mutant Ninja Turtles (2012 TV series) season 1 =

Teenage Mutant Ninja Turtles
- Season 1
- DVD cover for "Teenage Mutant Ninja Turtles" Season 1
- Showrunners: Ciro Nieli; Joshua Sternin; J. R. Ventimilia
- Starring: Jason Biggs; Rob Paulsen; Sean Astin; Greg Cipes
- No. of episodes: 26

Release
- Original network: Nickelodeon
- Original release: September 28, 2012 – August 8, 2013

Season chronology
- Next → Season 2

The first season of the 2012 Teenage Mutant Ninja Turtles series aired on Nickelodeon in the United States from September 28, 2012, to August 8, 2013. The season introduces the four turtles Leonardo (voiced by Jason Biggs), Donatello (voiced by Rob Paulsen), Raphael (voiced by Sean Astin) and Michelangelo (voiced by Greg Cipes).

== Plot ==
The story starts with the turtles (Leonardo, Raphael, Donatello and Michelangelo) leaving their lair for the first time, and they immediately come into conflict with the Kraang, an alien race who are kidnapping April O'Neil and her father Kirby, with Donatello developing a crush on the former, they are unable to stop the Kraang. In order to work well as a team, Splinter chooses Leonardo as their leader, they are able to save April but not Kirby and become friends regardless. Their first encounter with the Kraang leads the Shredder to discovering his old enemy's hideout.

During the course of the story, the turtles learn more about the history between Splinter and the Shredder, that they were like brothers but their love for Tang Shen caused them to become enemies and the latter accidentally killed Tang Shen. The turtles meet Leatherhead, a mutant alligator who becomes an ally. The turtles are usually thwarting Kraang, the Foot or mutants created by the mutagen, the turtles also meet Karai, Shredder's adopted daughter who is not as hostile as the rest of the Foot with them until they betray her to take Shredder out.

The turtles eventually meet Kraang Prime, the Kraang's hive mind who using Technodrome tries to invade Earth but is thwarted, Splinter also faces Shredder for the first time after many years and learns that Karai is actually Miwa, his daughter.

== Production ==
On October 21, 2009, a press release was made indicating that Viacom had bought the complete rights of the Teenage Mutant Ninja Turtles franchise from Peter Laird for $60 million. Viacom would be developing a CGI animated TV series for its Nickelodeon family of channels for broadcast in 2012. A feature film was released by Paramount Pictures, which is also a division of Viacom in 2014.

Jason Biggs voices Leonardo and Rob Paulsen voices Donatello. In June 2011, it was confirmed that Sean Astin is playing Raphael and Greg Cipes is Michelangelo. In August 2011, it was revealed that Mae Whitman would be the voice for April O'Neil. In April 2012, it was announced that Phil LaMarr would be playing the role of Baxter Stockman and Nolan North would be playing a race of aliens known as the Kraang, while Roseanne Barr was confirmed to voice their leader, Kraang Prime. Actress Kelly Hu confirmed her role as Karai in May 2012.

Production art was leaked on the Nickelodeon website before it was taken down. The images showed the designs of all four Turtles, Shredder, Splinter, a teenage April O'Neil and the Kraang, an alien race that combines elements of both Krang and the Utroms. A trailer for the series was released on June 21, 2012, on Nickelodeon USA.

== Episodes ==
No. overall	No. in season	Title	Directed by	Written by	Storyboarded by	Original release date	Prod. code	U.S. viewers (millions)
1	1	"Rise of the Turtles"	Michael Chang	Joshua Sternin and J. R. Ventimilia	Adam Lucas, Ciro Nieli and Luke Weber	September 28, 2012	101	2.30
2	2	"Rise of the Turtles"	Alan Wan	Joshua Sternin and J. R. Ventimilia	Christian Lignan and Byron Penaranda	September 29, 2012	102	3.92
Part 1: Years ago, Hamato Yoshi, a Japanese ninja master, moves to New York City and purchases four baby turtles, before witnessing a shady deal in an alleyway; in the resulting fight, he and the turtles are coated by a strange chemical mutagen, transforming Yoshi into a humanoid rat and the Turtles into anthropomorphic form. In the present, Yoshi, now known as Splinter, has trained the Turtles—Leonardo, Donatello, Michelangelo and Raphael—in the art of ninjutsu, and celebrates their fifteenth "Mutation Day" with them. Splinter begrudgingly allows the Turtles to visit the surface world, where they encounter pizza for the first time and observe a teenager named April O'Neil, with whom Donatello becomes infatuated. April and her father Kirby are then attacked by a group of strange men, and, unable to work together, the Turtles fail to stop them from being kidnapped—immediately after, Michelangelo discovers that the kidnappers are androids piloted by brain-like aliens, but the other Turtles dismiss him. Splinter chastises the Turtles for their failure, yet agrees that they have to take action, deeming Leonardo the Turtles' leader in order to help them function as a team. The Turtles track down the kidnappers' van and their associate, Snake. In the process, they discover another canister of the chemical mutagen. Part 2: The Turtles interrogate Snake using the Mutagen, learning that the kidnappers are called the Kraang and that they have been kidnapping scientists across the city. Snake escapes soon afterwards, and overhears Leonardo and Raphael discussing a fake plan to rescue the O'Neils. The Turtles recoup in the lair, where Splinter warns Leonardo that every leader must prepare to face failure, recounting the story of how he lost his wife Tang Shen and daughter Miwa in the final battle with his rival, Oroku Saki. The Turtles sneak into the Kraang's base, where Michelangelo accidentally triggers the alarms, and the Kraang try to make off with the O'Neils. Before the Turtles can rescue them, they end up in a fight with Snake, who had been exposed to the Mutagen and transformed into a giant weed monster, which Michelangelo dubs "Snakeweed". Donatello rescues April but is forced to leave Kirby, while the other Turtles electrocute Snakeweed. Once they have escaped, April is left with her aunt, and Splinter expressed pride in Leonardo's leadership. The news reports a supposed ninja sighting; and, watching the report in Japan, Oroku Saki, now known as the Shredder, realizes that Hamato Yoshi is still alive and decides to travel to New York to finish their battle.
3	3	"Turtle Temper"	Alan Wan	Jeremy Shipp	Byron Penaranda and Christian Lignan	October 6, 2012	103	3.25
While spying on the Kraang, the Turtles are discovered and accosted by a New Yorker named Vic, who antagonizes Raphael enough to blow their cover, and captures footage of them fighting the Kraang. Splinter forces Raphael into a training exercise that preys on his temper, and orders his students to recover the footage peacefully. The Turtles attempt to reason with Vic to get the video, but Raphael's anger once again gets the better of him, resulting in the Kraang kidnapping Vic. Leonardo orders Raphael to return to the lair, where Splinter tells him the story of how he allowed his own temper to grow out of control in an argument with Oroku Saki, which transformed their rivalry into bitter hatred, using this to teach his son to let go of his anger. The Turtles track Vic to a warehouse, where he is inadvertently mutated into a giant spider, dubbed "Spider Bytez" by Michelangelo, who attacks them. Raphael arrives and, following Splinter's advice, overcomes his anger and helps the Turtles defeat Spider Bytes, who escapes.
4	4	"New Friend, Old Enemy"	Juan Jose Meza-Leon	Joshua Hamilton	Chong Lee, Ciro Nieli, Luke Weber and Sheldon Vella	October 13, 2012	104	2.80
Shredder, now in New York, sends his enigmatic top pupil and several Foot Clan ninjas to attack the Turtles, who manage to escape. In the lair, Michelangelo, wanting more human friends, decides to befriend Chris Bradford, a famous martial artist visiting New York. First sending Bradford a friend request over social media, he goes to meet him in person, with Bradford showing surprising interest in his sensei and family, teaching Michelangelo one of his secret techniques, "The Death Dragon", to gain his trust. Witnessing the other Turtles practicing The Death Dragon, Splinter recognizes it as one of the Shredder's techniques, making the Turtles realize that Bradford is Shredder's pupil. Bradford reveals his deception and captures Michelangelo, and with Shredder's other top lieutenant, Xever Montes, attempts to track the Turtles back to their lair when they rescue their brother. However, the Turtles instead lead Bradford and Montes into a trap, flushing them away into the sewer. Michelangelo laments over being unable to find a friend, but is reassured by Raphael that he is a good person and deserves better than Bradford.
5	5	"I Think His Name Is Baxter Stockman"	Michael Chang and Ciro Nieli	Joshua Sternin and J. R. Ventimilia	Irineo Maramba, Ben Jones, Alan Wan, Jake Castorena and Luke Weber	October 20, 2012	105	3.40
Splinter grounds his sons for skateboarding in the lair. However, the Turtles decide to sneak out against his orders, taking with them Donatello's new T-Pod—a music player powered by a self-upgrading military intelligence chip. While on patrol, the Turtles encounter Baxter Stockman, a disgruntled TCRI scientist seeking revenge against his former employers, and easily defeat him. However, the T-Pod is left behind, and Stockman uses the military intelligence chip to upgrade his battle armor, becoming a dangerous supervillain. With Splinter's advice, the Turtles are able to overcome "Stockman-Pod" and destroy the T-Pod.
6	6	"Metalhead"	Juan Jose Meza-Leon	Tom Alvarado	Chong Lee and Sheldon Vella	October 27, 2012	106	3.61
Donatello becomes frustrated in using his Bō-Staff against to fight the technologically-advanced Kraang, and decides to upgrade himself. Using a stolen Kraang android, he creates Metalhead; a remote-controlled robot turtle to fight in his place. Donatello sends Metalhead out with the Turtles when April discovers the Kraang's plan to poison New York's water supply with mutagen, although Metalhead soon falls under the Kraang's control when they realize it is made from their technology. With Splinter's guidance, Donatello manages to defeat Metalhead and foil the Kraang's plot, but still remains determined to upgrade his weaponry.
7	7	"Monkey Brains"	Alan Wan	Russ Carney and Ron Corcillo	Christian Lignan and Byron Penaranda	November 3, 2012	107	3.69
Following a training exercise, Splinter advises Donatello to learn how to fight without thinking. Later, wanting to spend time with April, Donatello accompanies her in investigating the disappearance of Dr. Tyler Rockwell, a neuroscientist presumably kidnapped by the Kraang. April and Donatello meet Dr. Victor Falco, Rockwell's colleague, and learn that Rockwell had been paid by the Kraang to experiment on a test monkey with mutagen; and soon after, they are attacked by a mutant monkey that is able to predict Donatello's every move and reacts to emotion. The Turtles and April capture the monkey, realizing that he is actually a mutated Rockwell, who has developed psychic powers from his experiments on the mutagen. Rockwell is returned to Falco's care, although the Turtles soon realize that Falco had been experimenting on Rockwell before he escaped, and return to confront him. Having now obtained psychic abilities of his own, Falco easily defeats the Turtles by reading their minds, but Donatello is able to defeat him by fighting without thinking. Falco escapes, and the Turtles decide to release Rockwell. Taking notice of her fine intuition, Splinter offers to train April to become a kunoichi, which she accepts.: April's strong inherent psychic and extrasensory abilities are implied here.
8	8	"Never Say Xever"	Michael Chang	Kenny Byerly	Adam Lucas and Luke Weber	November 10, 2012	108	2.92
April takes the Turtles to Mr. Murakami's noodle shop, which is attacked by the Purple Dragons gang. The Turtles defeat the Dragons, and Leonardo shows mercy to their leader, Fong. With April's help, the Turtles decide to defeat the Dragons for good to make them stay away from Murakami, but end up in a fight with the Dragons and the Foot Clan, now being led by Xever following his and Bradford's previous failure. To lure their enemies out, the Foot kidnap Murakami, forcing the Turtles to come for a final confrontation. Deciding to follow Raphael's insistence on a harder response, the Turtles kidnap Bradford to use as a trade for Murakami, but the plan falls apart when Montes proves uncaring about his partner's safety. The Turtles fight the Foot and the Dragons, and, grateful for Leonardo's acts of mercy, Fong discretely assists the Turtles in battle, allowing them to wash to Foot away. Murakami is returned to his shop, and reveals to the Turtles that, despite being blind, he is well aware that they are mutants. Meanwhile, Shredder, disgusted with his minion's failures, decides to take care of the Turtles himself.
9	9	"The Gauntlet"	Juan Jose Meza-Leon	Joshua Sternin and J. R. Ventimilia	Chong Suk Lee, Ciro Nieli and Sheldon Vella	November 17, 2012	109	2.80
April finds herself being stalked by a mutant pigeon named Pete, who reveals that he is carrying a message from her father, warning her to leave the city. April and the Turtles infiltrate the Kraang's base, learning from Kirby that the Kraang have brought the mutagen from their dimension and seek to stabilize it for unknown purposes, also plotting to unleash a mutagen bomb that will coat half of New York. Kirby stays behind to distract the Kraang while the Turtles escape, making their way to the bomb. Despite dealing with the Kraang guards, the Turtles are forced into battle with Xever and Bradford, seeking to win back Shredder's favor by destroying them. Donatello successfully defuses the bomb, and Bradford ends up coating himself and Montes in mutagen. As they celebrate their victory, the Turtles are attacked by the Shredder, who mercilessly defeats them. The Turtles manage to escape when Shredder is distracted by Bradford and Xever's transformation into a mutant akita and snakehead, and return to the lair, where Splinter declares that they are now at war.
10	10	"Panic in the Sewers"	Alan Wan	Jeremy Shipp	Michael Fong and Rie Koga	November 24, 2012	110	2.92
Splinter suffers a nightmare where the Turtles are killed by the Shredder, and forces them to train endlessly before they encounter Shredder again. April learns from spying on the Purple Dragons that Shredder plans to wipe out the sewers and, thus, the Turtles' lair. While staking out Shredder's hideout, the Turtles end up in a fight with the mutated Bradford, dubbed "Dogpound" by Michelangelo, and lose, demoralizing them even further. April decides to spy in their place, learning that the Foot and Dragons are to hijack a tanker truck, but ends up being captured in the process. Inspired by Raphael to get over his panicking, Leonardo employs Donatello's new Patrol Buggy to catch up with the Foot, and Raphael and Donatello save April while Leonardo and Michelangelo prevent Dogpound from dumping the tanker's chlorosulfonic acid into the sewers. In the lair, Splinter apologizes for causing his sons to grow paranoid, and allows them to rest.
11	11	"Mousers Attack!"	Michael Chang	Kenny Byerly	Adam Lucas and Byron Penaranda	December 8, 2012	111	3.37
Friction grows between the Turtles when Leonardo and Raphael, particularly the latter, deem Donatello and Michelangelo the more expendable half of their team. April comes to the lair after being mugged of her phone by the Purple Dragons, and the Turtles decide to intervene. However, while trying to get the phone back, Dragons' hideout is raided by a group of robotic drones, making the Turtles split up into groups to track the robots and recover the phone. Leonardo and Raphael discover that the drones, names MOUSERS, are Baxter Stockman's latest creations, and are chased by an army of them throughout New York, while Stockman is kidnapped by the Dragons. Meanwhile, Donatello and Michelangelo are captured while trying to recover the phone from the Dragons and Dogpound, with the captured Stockman agreeing to hack it to track down the location of the Turtle's lair. The two groups converge with one another, and, together, destroy the phone and deter the MOUSERS onto the villains. The Turtles make amends with each other, and Donatello gives April one of his T-Phones as compensation. Unbeknownst to the Turtles, Stockman is brought to The Foot's lair, where Shredder employs his mechanical genius to help in his plans.
12	12	"It Came from the Depths"	Juan Jose Meza-Leon	Russ Carney and Ron Corcillo	Chong Suk Lee and Sheldon Vella	December 15, 2012	112	3.46
News footage of a monster in the sewers starts to circulate, and the Turtles decide to deal with the creature before the sewers are investigated. The Turtles discover the creature to be a mutant American alligator, which is being attacked by the Kraang. Michelangelo convinces his brothers to help and bring the mutant back to the lair, where Splinter compliments his compassion and assigns him to comfort the mutant while his brothers investigate what the Kraang wanted with him. Michelangelo befriends the mutant and names him Leatherhead, while the other Turtles discover an alien power cell in the sewers. Leatherhead goes berserk upon seeing that the power cell has been taken, and is driven off by Splinter, with Michelangelo following. At an abandoned subway car, Leatherhead, calming himself, explains to the Turtles that he was once a normal alligator who was discovered and subjected to horrific experiments by the Kraang, only to escape from their dimension, taking with him the power cell that fuels their portal to Earth in order to spare it from their evil. Having tracked the power cell, the Kraang attack, but the Turtles, handed over the power cell by Leatherhead, use it to boost the subway car and escape the Kraang.
13	13	"I, Monster"	Michael Chang	Jase Ricci	Adam Lucas and Byron Penaranda	January 25, 2013	113	2.61
Dr. Victor Falco continues to experiment with obtaining psychic powers, plotting revenge against the Turtles for driving him into hiding. Because of a chewed wire, a fire breaks out in Falco's lab, leaving him blind while gaining the ability to communicate with rats. Now horrifically disfigured and calling himself the Rat King, Falco plots to take over New York with armies of rats, while also infiltrating the mind of Splinter, whom he sees as a kindred spirit. The Turtles save April from being devoured by the rats, and are informed by a weary Splinter of the Rat King's lair. Arriving at the lair, the Turtles attempt to stop Rat King, only to be defeated by Splinter, now fully under Rat King's control. However, Leonardo and the Turtles are able to remind their master of his humanity, allowing him to defeat Rat King, who escapes.
14	14	"New Girl in Town"	Alan Wan	Jeremy Shipp	Michael Fong and Rie Koga	February 1, 2013	114	2.33
Snakeweed returns and begins abducting people. Tired of Raphael's constant criticism while trying to stop Snakeweed, Leonardo lets Raphael try his hand at leadership. While away from the group, Leonardo meets a female Foot Ninja named Karai, who tries to lure him to the dark side.
15	15	"The Alien Agenda"	Juan Jose Meza-Leon	Kenny Byerly	Chong Suk Lee and Sheldon Vella	February 8, 2013	115	2.42
Leo and Raph fight over whether or not they can trust Karai. The Turtles get their first look at high school when April's school project draws attention from the Kraang who have been disguising themselves as a company called the Worldwide Genome Project. Karai learns about the existence of the Kraang and tries to tell Shredder, but he is uninterested. Karai then follows the turtles into a Kraang research facility, where she is found by Raph, which ultimately leads to a battle between the Kraang and the Turtles.
16	16	"The Pulverizer"	Alan Wan	Russ Carney and Ron Corcillo	Miki Brewster, Michael Fong and Rie Koga	February 15, 2013	116	2.55
Donatello converts Leatherhead's subway car into a battle van, which Mikey names the Shellraiser. While taking the Shellraiser for a test drive, the Turtles meet their first fan, a teenager dressed up to fight crime as "The Pulverizer", who turns out to be a lazy teenage boy with no self defense skills whatsoever. But meanwhile, Stockman perfects a pair of cybernetic legs for the mutated Xever, who is given the nickname "Fishface" by Mikey, using stolen Kraang technology, and the Kraang search for their lost power cell.
17	17	"TCRI"	Michael Chang	Joshua Sternin and J. R. Ventimilia	Adam Lucas, Byron Penaranda and Sean Song	March 1, 2013	117	2.15
While breaking into the hostile environment of TCRI headquarters upon being told of its location by Leatherhead, the Turtles discover the true intent of the Kraang: to open a portal to Dimension X and begin an all-out invasion. The Turtles resolve to stop them – even if they end up having to fight the rock monster Traag. During the fight, Michelangelo finds a Kraang Data Storage Device. At the end of the fight, Leatherhead appears and pushes Traag into the portal; he also ends up in the portal too. The turtles return to the sewer, having "failed" their mission, but not until Mikey reveals that he found the Kraang Storage Device. When Donatello hacks into the device, he finds out then reveals to the whole team that the Kraang are after April for some reason, leaving the whole team, even Donnie and April in shock.
18	18	"Cockroach Terminator"	Juan Jose Meza-Leon	Jeremy Shipp	Chong Suk Lee and Sheldon Vella	March 15, 2013	118	2.19
Donatello creates a "spyroach" to spy on the Kraang in TCRI. They learn that the Kraang are planning on drilling into the Earth's core. Then, the spyroach becomes accidentally mutated. When the Turtles find the Spyroach, they find out that it is targeting Raphael, because he tried to destroy the spyroach earlier, since he is afraid of cockroaches.
19	19	"Baxter's Gambit"	Alan Wan	Jase Ricci	Michael Fong and Rie Koga	April 5, 2013	119	2.30
Following a three-way fight between the Turtles, the Foot, and the Kraang, Stockman convinces Shredder to let him use a foolproof plan. Unbeknownst to them, his true intentions with the plan involve seeking revenge on the Turtles (who have been foiling his plans) and Dogpound and Fishface (who have been abusing and threatening him) by luring them all into a deadly labyrinth called the Maze of Doom. Now the Turtles, Dogpound, and Fishface must form a temporary truce to get out of the Maze of Doom alive. Meanwhile, Splinter works to find the right weapon for April as she learns more about Splinter's past.
20	20	"Enemy of My Enemy"	Michael Chang	Kenny Byerly	Adam Lucas and Sean Song	April 12, 2013	120	2.31
When a Kraang invasion scheme threatens to destroy the Turtles and put the whole world in danger, Karai offers an alliance with the Turtles. After declining Karai's offer, the Turtles eventually decide that teaming up with Karai might be a good idea when Karai mentions weapons that are being shipped to the Shredder that she could steal. However, when the Turtles plan on destroying the Shredder once and for all, Karai's loyalty to the Turtles vanishes and now the Turtles must deal with Shredder and Karai as well as the Kraang.
21	21	"Karai's Vendetta"	Juan Jose Meza-Leon and Sebastian Montes	Russ Carney and Ron Corcillo	Chong Suk Lee and Sheldon Vella	April 27, 2013	121	3.05
After the Turtles discover a Kraang plot to turn Earth's water into Kraang water, they infiltrate an undersea Kraang base guarded by a sea creature from Dimension X. Shredder interrogates a captured Kraang droid and learns that April is not only an ally of the Turtles, but the key to the Kraang's ability to take over Earth, so Shredder sends Karai to capture her. April is skilled at evading Karai, but when cornered, she is terrible at fighting and is beaten up, but manages to escape by using a lesson that she learned from Splinter when Karai shows sympathy for her losing her mother.
22	22	"The Pulverizer Returns!"	Alan Wan	Jeremy Shipp	Michael Fong and Rie Koga	May 11, 2013	122	2.78
Whilst spying on Shredder's lackeys, the Turtles encounter the Pulverizer once more, who is working for the Foot. Meanwhile, Splinter tells the Turtles to switch weapons which isn’t a good idea so Leo gets the Bo Staff, Raph gets the Nunchucks, Donny gets the Sai and Mikey gets the Kantana Swords but when they switch their old weapons back during a fight with Dogpound, FishFace and the foot clan, Splinter takes the weapons away. During the struggle, Pulverizer purposely dumps ooze on himself, mutating him into a giant pile of slime.
23	23	"Parasitica"	Michael Chang	Pete Goldfinger	Adam Lucas and Sean Song	July 20, 2013	123	2.19
While investigating a destroyed Kraang hideout, the Turtles are attacked by a giant mutant wasp, which stings Leo. After the wasp dies they find an egg, which Leo says should be brought back to the lair. That night, Raph tries to destroy the egg but Leo, who is under the influence of the wasp's toxin, is determined to protect the egg. Leo bites Raph, infecting him as well. Mikey and Donnie attempt to cure them, although Donnie gets infected before he can finish the antidote. Donnie instructs Mikey on how to prepare the cure before succumbing to the infection and biting him. Mikey knocks him out, then finishes the antidote while desperately fighting off the influence of the bite, and administers the cure to himself and his brothers just as the egg hatches. Mikey then kills the newborn wasps with the Shellraiser's cannon.
24	24	"Operation: Break Out"	Michael Chang	Jase Ricci	Adam Lucas and Sean Song	July 27, 2013	124	2.15
In an attempt to impress April, Donatello breaks into a secret Kraang detention center alone in order to rescue Kirby O'Neil. He manages to rescue Kirby, although they end up trapped in the detention center with a deadly prisoner called the Newtralizer. Meanwhile, April is hearing sounds that even Splinter can't. The Turtles successfully escape the Newtralizer and bring Kirby to their lair, where he re-unites with his daughter, although they are unaware of the fact that Kirby has fallen under the Kraang's control.
25	25	"Showdown"	Juan Jose Meza-Leon and Sebastian Montes	Joshua Sternin and J. R. Ventimilia	Chong Suk Lee and Sheldon Vella	August 8, 2013	125	3.14
26	26	"Showdown"	Alan Wan	Joshua Sternin and J. R. Ventimilia	Michael Fong and Rie Koga	August 8, 2013	126	3.14
Part 1: After learning that the Kraang are planning an invasion, The Turtles engage in a difficult battle as they make a desperate assault on TCRI to shut down the Kraang's portal before it summons the Technodrome, and in order to save April whom the Kraang managed to capture with the help of Shredder. They destroy TCRI, but not before the Technodrome comes through the portal. Part 2: The Turtles must infiltrate the Technodrome in order to save April. Meanwhile, Splinter faces off against Shredder after defeating Dogpound and Fishface. When Splinter recognizes Karai as his own now-teenage daughter, Miwa, (whom Shredder had told that Hamato Yoshi was the ruthless murderer of her mother Tang Shen), he retreats in sorrow; unable to fight against his own child. Back at the Technodrome, the Turtles must get through Kraang Prime to get to April before Kraang Prime can use her inherent mental abilities in order effectively trans-mutate the human race into fellow Kraang.
