= Teenage Mutant Ninja Turtles IV =

1994 cancelled film directed by Steve Barron

- Directed by: Steve Barron
- Written by: Steve Barron; Craig Shapiro; John Travis
- Based on: Characters by Kevin Eastman and Peter Laird
- Produced by: Thomas K. Gray; Kim Dawson; David Chan
- Starring: Elias Koteas; Paige Turco
- Production company: Golden Harvest
- Distributed by: New Line Cinema

Teenage Mutant Ninja Turtles IV (or The Next Mutation) was a planned superhero film based on the Teenage Mutant Ninja Turtles characters created by Kevin Eastman and Peter Laird. It would have been directed by Steve Barron and written by Craig Shapiro and John Travis, being the third sequel in the Turtles film series, following Teenage Mutant Ninja Turtles III (1993). It would have starred Elias Koteas and Paige Turco, with the voices of Brian Tochi, Robbie Rist, Adam Carl, and Tim Kelleher. The film's plot also did not adapt the Mirage comic book series or the animated series similar to the previous film, it would have revolved around the Turtles getting new powers, and they would also get a new turtle, Kirby, who would have been the most hardcore of all the Turtles. April O'Neil turns evil and marries Casey Jones, teaming up with the Turtles' nemesis the Shredder.

== Production and cancellation ==
Planned for a 1996 theratical release, the film’s writers, Christian Ford and Roger Soffer, wrote a screenplay called the Untitled Screenplay, or The Foot Walks Again. Both Kevin Eastman and Peter Laird thought the idea of changing the Turtles' backstories and characteristics was foolish, but conceded that it would have generated more interest in the characters. Once the New Line Cinema governor heard about the idea of a new Ninja Turtles film, he stuck around for distribution until the commercial failure of Teenage Mutant Ninja Turtles III, so they cancelled the "already planned out" film script, sceenplay, and act. The film was replaced by a 1997 kids' TV show, Ninja Turtles: The Next Mutation, which is the first and only live-action television series in the Teenage Mutant Ninja Turtles franchise.
