= Rise of the Turtles =

- Teenage Mutant Ninja Turtles episodes
- Episode nos.: Season 1 Episodes 1 and 2
- Directed by: Michael Chang (Part 1); Alan Wan (Part 2)
- Written by: Joshua Sternin; J.R. Ventimilia
- Production codes: 101; 102
- Original air dates: September 28, 2012 (Part 1); September 29, 2012 (Part 2)

Episode chronology
← Previous —	Next → "Turtle Temper"

"Rise of the Turtles" is the two-part series premiere of the 2012 Teenage Mutant Ninja Turtles series. The first part of the episodes aired on Nickelodeon on September 28, 2012, with the second part airing the following day on September 29, 2012.

In the episodes, the Turtles visit the surface world in New York City for the first time since being mutated, and witness the Kraang kidnap April O'Neil and her father, Kirby. The Turtles attempt to rescue the O'Neils, while learning of the mutagen possessed by the Kraang which could hold many secrets relating to their mutations.

== Plot ==
=== Part 1 ===
Years ago, Japanese ninja master Hamato Yoshi moves to New York City and purchases four baby turtles before witnessing two men with a canister containing a mutagen substance; in the resulting fight, he and the turtles are infected with the mutagen, transforming Yoshi into a humanoid rat and the Turtles into anthropomorphic form. In the present, Yoshi, now known as Splinter has trained the Turtles—Leonardo, Donatello, Raphael and Michelangelo—in the art of ninjutsu, and they celebrate their fifteenth "Mutation Day" in their lair in the sewers.

Splinter begrudgingly allows the Turtles to visit the surface world, where they encounter pizza for the first time, and observe a teenager named April O'Neil, whom Donatello develops a crush for. April and her father Kirby are confronted by a group of suited men, and the Turtles, unable to work together, obstruct each other as the men kidnap April and Kirby. Michelangelo discovers that the kidnappers are androids piloted by brain-like aliens, but the other Turtles dismiss him.

Back in the lair, Splinter criticises the Turtles for their inability to work together, yet relents that having trained them as individuals, they were ill-equipped and considers waiting another year. Donatello pleads Splinter to let them save April and Kirby, to which he agrees. In order to help the Turtles function as a team, Splinter deems Leonardo the leader, much to Raphael's irritation. The Turtles track down the kidnappers' van, where they discover another mutagen canister.

=== Part 2 ===
The Turtles interrogate the van's driver Snake, an associate of the kidnappers who reveal them to be the Kraang, who have been kidnapping scientists across the city. Snake escapes soon afterwards, and overhears Leonardo and Raphael discussing a fake plan to rescue the O'Neils. The Turtles recoup in the lair, where Splinter warns Leonardo that every leader must prepare to face failure, recounting his final battle with his former friend-turned rival Oroku Saki, resulting in the loss of his wife Tang Shen and daughter Miwa.

The Turtles secretly infiltrate the Kraang's base while as a distraction, the van crashes into the building, causing Snake to be exposed to the mutagen. Michelangelo accidentally triggers the alarms, alerting the Kraang, whom Leonardo, Raphael and Michelangelo fight while Donatello attempts to free the O'Neils from their cell, who are then captured by the Kraang. The Turtles escape the base and are confronted by Snake, who has mutated into a giant weed monster which Michelangelo dubs "Snakeweed". Donatello rescues April but is forced to leave Kirby, while the other Turtles electrocute Snakeweed; after April and the Turtles escape, Snakeweed's heart begins beating again.

April is left with her aunt, and the Turtles promise to find and rescue Kirby. Splinter expresses pride in Leonardo's leadership, informing him that he made Leonardo leader for asking. The news reports a supposed ninja sighting; and, watching the report in Japan, Oroku Saki, now known as the Shredder, realizes that Hamato Yoshi is still alive and decides to travel to New York to finish their battle.

== Reception ==
=== Critical response ===
Max Nicholson of IGN gave "Rise of The Turtles" a rating of 8.5/10, saying "The action sequences are fluid, fast-paced and exciting, and the dialogue-heavy scenes are usually peppered with entertaining slapstick." Toon Zone reviewer Grant White gave the episode a positive review, saying "Although I enjoyed this premiere, not everything sat well with me. There are some parts of both the writing and animation that felt poor and sometimes overlapped." Noel Kirkpatrick at TV.com called the episode "a tad on the bland side". He cites that while there's plenty for surprises for the show's plot, "in laying the groundwork, this pilot didn't really do anything new". Matt Edwards at Den of Geek opined that the episode is "so polished and ell executed," and praised it for its balance of comedy and action, stating "A very strong start to the series, then, and one I’ve found myself revisiting frequently."

The episode's original run garnered approximately 3.9 million viewers within the United States.
