= Teenage Mutant Ninja Turtles (2012 TV series) season 2 =

Teenage Mutant Ninja Turtles
- Season 2
- Showrunner: Ciro Nieli
- Starring: Jason Biggs (episodes 1–17, 19); Dominic Catrambone (episodes 18, 20–26); Rob Paulsen; Sean Astin; Greg Cipes
- No. of episodes: 26

Release
- Original network: Nickelodeon
- Original release: October 12, 2013 – September 26, 2014

Season chronology
- ← Previous; Season 1 Next → Season 3

The second season of the 2012 Teenage Mutant Ninja Turtles series aired on Nickelodeon in the United States from October 12, 2013, to September 26, 2014.

== Plot ==
The second season takes off right after the first season. During a skirmish with the Kraang, April O'Neil's father is accidentally mutated, causing a fracture between her and the turtles. This season also introduces Casey Jones, who becomes friends with April and also develops a crush on her while she is away from the turtles, she eventually forgives the turtles and Casey becomes friends with them, and they are also able to save her father.

From Japan, Shredder brings Tiger Claw with him, a humanoid tiger and assassin who becomes Shredder's second in command. Splinter reveals to the turtles that Karai is his daughter, she eventually learns the truth but is captured by the Shredder. In an effort to bait the turtles and Splinter, Shredder takes Karai hostage and threatens to mutate her, while he wishes to mutate the turtles into snakes but Karai is mutated instead, but is able to return herself to human form at will.

At the end of the season, Shredder enters an alliance with the Kraang to find Karai and destroy the turtles in return of helping them take over New York. Kraang Subprime, the Kraang's master spy who has been posing as April's best friend Irma Langenstein, discovers the Turtles' lair and the invasion begins. Shredder defeats Splinter, Leo is wounded by the Foot Clan, and all of people of New York are mutated into human-Kraang hybrids. Defeated, the turtles along with April and Casey escape New York and take shelter in O'Neil's farmhouse upstate.

== Production ==
On October 2, 2012, Nickelodeon ordered a second season of Teenage Mutant Ninja Turtles.

Executive producer Ciro Nieli confirmed that Mutagen Man would have a large role in the second season and an hour-long episode featuring the voice actors of the original TMNT series (Cam Clarke, Townsend Coleman, Barry Gordon, and Rob Paulsen) in their respective roles for a cameo.

Corey Feldman (who was the voice of Donatello from the first and third entries of the original film series) was confirmed to play the role of Slash. Recurring franchise character Casey Jones was confirmed to appear in the second season of the series, where he is voiced by Josh Peck.

Jason Biggs departed the role of Leonardo after the 18th episode of season 2 and was temporarily replaced by Dominic Catrambone. Seth Green assumed the role beginning in season 3.

== Episodes ==
No. overall	No. in season	Title	Directed by	Written by	Storyboarded by	Original release date	Prod. code	US viewers (millions)
27	1	"The Mutation Situation"	Sebastian Montes and Ciro Nieli	Brandon Auman	Miki Brewster, Chong Suk Lee and Sheldon Vella	October 12, 2013	201	2.68
The Turtles' mission to prevent the Kraang from delivering a shipment of mutagen to Shredder causes the mutagen canisters to scatter into the city, where one of them hits Kirby O'Neil, causing him to turn into a vampire bat mutant. After finding out what happened through Mikey, April O'Neil gets extremely upset and disappointed in the brothers for her father's mutation as she angrily walks out on them, putting her friendship with the Turtles at stake.
28	2	"Follow the Leader"	Alan Wan	Eugene Son	Kristafer Anka, Michael Fong and Rie Koga	November 2, 2013	202	2.49
Leonardo and Raphael have fallen out after Raph says he's the leader again but when Leo gets kidnapped by Karai, who's been put in charge of the Foot Clan while Shredder's away. Raph says it's all his fault and Splinter tells the three Turtles to rescue Leonardo, putting the Turtles against her new Foot Bots and Splinter tells Leonardo that Karai is his daughter.
29	3	"Invasion of the Squirrelanoids"	Michael Chang	Todd Garfield	Sung Jin Ahn, Adam Lucas and Ed Tadem	October 19, 2013	203	2.61
While searching for the missing mutagen, the Turtles encounter a squirrel forcing its way down the throat of a homeless man. After taking him back to their lair for study, the Turtles are shocked when the creature multiplies within the man's stomach and escapes.
30	4	"Mutagen Man Unleashed"	Sebastian Montes	Kevin Burke and Chris "Doc" Wyatt	Miki Brewster, Chong Suk Lee and Sheldon Vella	November 9, 2013	204	2.67
Donnie becomes very jealous of a student April, who is still holding a grudge against him and his brothers for her father's mutation, is tutoring in math named Casey Jones and vents his sorrows to Timothy. The mutated Pulverizer, affected by this, then begins feeding on the experimental mutagen, enabling him to form sludgy arms and legs, transforming him into the Mutagen blob mutant "Mutagen Man" before escaping to find and persuade April.
31	5	"Mikey Gets Shellacne"	Alan Wan	Thomas Krajewski	Kristafer Anka, Michael Fong and Rie Koga	November 16, 2013	205	2.67
Mikey plays with some rejected retro-mutagen samples and contracts a dangerous acne infection that mutates out of control. The Turtles head to the remains of TCRI to find a molecular centrifuge to make an antidote for the infection and find Baxter Stockman with the only one in his possession. Without the centrifuge to help with the cure, Mikey is doomed, so he does whatever it takes to retrieve it, later running afoul of Dogpound, who is mutated by a second mutagen batch into the werewolf-like super-mutant "Rahzar".
32	6	"Target: April O'Neil"	Michael Chang	Nicole Dubuc	Adam Lucas, Samuel Montes and Ed Tadem	November 23, 2013	206	2.54
While walking on the street, April was visited by Donnie, much to her surprised despite everything has happened between them, but she extremely makes it makes clear to him that she wants him and his brothers to stay away from her. Although, before Donnie did just that, April takes a second to listen to him said that some things can't be controlled. However, little do both April and the Turtles know, Karai and the Kraang continue their pursuit on her with an advanced Foot Bot called "Chrome Dome". Meanwhile, April is hanging out with Casey as he tells her about how he unintentionally ruined a friendship once as he remarked that everything can't be controlled. Hearing this, April takes Donnie's advice into consideration and becomes filled with regret for pushing him alongside his brothers away for something that was unintentional. However, during an attack by the Footbots and seeing the situation getting out of hand, April not only realized that Donnie and Casey were right that everything can't be controlled but also sees the consequences of her actions, especially when she realized that she put Casey in danger, as she puts her grudge aside to call the Turtles for help. After taking both Chrome Dome, a squadron of Footbots and Karai down, April repairs her friendship with the Turtles and apologized to them for her behavior, especially to Donnie as she gives him a kiss on cheek.
33	7	"Slash and Destroy"	Sebastian Montes	Gavin Hignight	Miki Brewster, Chong Suk Lee and Sheldon Vella	November 30, 2013	207	2.51
After Raph's pet box turtle Spike drinks some mutagen, he mutates into a spiky, hulking box turtle mutant, renaming himself "Slash". Slash offers Raph a chance to join with him and form an ultimate ninja team, to which Raph happily accepts, thrilled by the idea of fighting crime side-by-side with his newly mutated buddy. However, Slash's true motives eventually emerge: The demise of Leo, Donnie, and Mikey!
34	8	"The Good, the Bad, and Casey Jones"	Michael Chang	Johnny Hartmann	Adam Lucas, Samuel Montes and Ed Tadem	February 2, 2014	208	2.69
Casey Jones establishes a new motive to protect New York from any future attacks from ninja and mutants. Casey ends up meeting Raphael (who is learning about anger control from Splinter) and since he is both a mutant and a ninja, Casey considers him a threat. Casey ends up following Raph to the sewer lair and discovers the existence of Splinter and the other three Turtles, as well as their friendship with April. However, he unintentionally leads the Foot Bots to the lair. Raph and Casey have to set aside their differences before their location is revealed to Karai.
35	9	"The Kraang Conspiracy"	Alan Wan	Brandon Auman	Kristafer Anka, Michael Fong and Rie Koga	February 9, 2014	209	2.87
April feels left out and insists on joining the Turtles on a mission to a newly-rebuilt TCRI. During this time, a disturbingly dark secret about April's origins and past is revealed by a mysterious man by the name of Jack Kurtzman.: April's innate psychic and extrasensory powers (which were first implied in Episode 7, Monkey Brains) are fully proven here.
36	10	"Fungus Humungous"	Sebastian Montes	Mark Henry	Miki Brewster, Chong Suk Lee and Sheldon Vella	February 16, 2014	210	2.81
When the spawns of mutated sentient mushrooms spread through the sewers, their spores cause April, Casey, and the Turtles to experience their worst fears. Leonardo must face his greatest fear of losing his team in order to stop the Fungus.: April has Chiroptophobia (fear of bats), Casey has musophobia (fear of rats), Raph's fear is cockroaches, Mikey's is the Squirrelnoids, Donnie's is being rejected by April... because of what happened to her dad, Leo's is being a bad leader and the Fungi's is the sunlight.
37	11	"Metalhead Rewired"	Alan Wan	Peter Di Cicco	Michael Fong, Rie Koga and LeSean Thomas	February 23, 2014	211	2.66
After Donnie further upgrades and modifies Metalhead's artificial intelligence/multi-agent system, the other Turtles become suspicious of the new, sentient Metalhead. At the same time, the Turtles stumble upon the Kraang's plot where they have been capturing both human and animal mutants so that they can control them.
38	12	"Of Rats and Men"	Sebastian Montes	Todd Garfield	Miki Brewster, Chong Suk Lee and Sheldon Vella	March 2, 2014	212	2.65
When the Rat King returns, Splinter must overcome his fears of being controlled by Rat King in order to defeat his enemy. Meanwhile, Michelangelo adopts a stray cat that April found who unknowingly eats ice cream and mutagen, transforming it into an cat/ice cream-based mutant dubbed "Ice Cream Kitty".
39	13	"The Manhattan Project" "Wormquake!"	Michael Chang and Alan Wan	Brandon Auman and John Shirley	Adam Lucas, Samuel Montes, Ed Tadem, Michael Fong, Michah Gunnell and Rie Koga	March 14, 2014	213	2.36
40	14	"The Manhattan Project" "Wormquake!"	Michael Chang and Alan Wan	Brandon Auman and John Shirley	Adam Lucas, Samuel Montes, Ed Tadem, Michael Fong, Michah Gunnell and Rie Koga	March 14, 2014	214	2.36
Part 1: When the Shredder returns from Japan with a new apprentice, a Bengal tiger mutant called Tiger Claw, Leo considers asking Splinter for help. Meanwhile, Donnie must put aside his rivalry with Casey in order to uncover a Kraang plot that involves gigantic blue worms, which are the source of all mutagen called Kraathatrogons that are the cause of violent earthquakes all over Manhattan.: Leo informs Karai that she is the only daughter of Splinter and the late Tang Shen: Miwa.; Part 2: With Splinter poisoned and taken captive by Tiger Claw and Karai, it's up to Leonardo, Raphael and Michelangelo to rescue their father-like mentor/sensei from Shredder's wrath. Meanwhile, Donnie discovers a way to slow down the Kraathatrogon worms, with salt and close the vortex that had brought to Earth.: This episode was released 12 days early (March 2, 2014) on official distributors for the series, including Nick.com. Cam Clarke, Townsend Coleman, Barry Gordon and Rob Paulsen (who plays Donnie in this series) reprise their roles as the 1987 Turtles, respectively, at the end of the episode. Gordon and Coleman were incorrectly credited for each other's role in the credits. Promotional material listed this episode as "Wormquake!" while the title used within the episode itself is "The Manhattan Project".
41	15	"Mazes & Mutants"	Michael Chang	Eugene Son	Adam Lucas, Samuel Montes and Ed Tadem	April 27, 2014	215	2.67
The Turtles try to relax by playing a role-playing game called "Mazes & Mutants," but the game becomes real when a house sparrow mutant named "Sir Malachi" sends the Turtles into the game in order to make it through the maze, defeat the dragon, and save Princess April.
42	16	"The Lonely Mutation of Baxter Stockman"	Sebastian Montes	Brandon Auman	Miki Brewster, Chong Suk Lee and Sheldon Vella	May 4, 2014	216	2.32
Donnie finally discovers a Retro-Mutagen that can restore Kirby to his human form as he, the other Turtles and April set out to find him. Meanwhile, Stockman gets mutated by Shredder into the housefly mutant "Stockman-Fly" for his 74 consecutive failures to create a perfect mutant army. When he finds out about the Retro-Mutagen, he kidnaps April and demands that the Turtles hand it over to him in exchange for her, prompting the Turtles and Casey to go and rescue her, whilst facing off against Razhar.
43	17	"Newtralized!"	Alan Wan	Gavin Hignight	Michael Fong, Michah Gunnell and Rie Koga	May 11, 2014	217	2.03
Tension arises between Raph and Casey due to Casey's inability to handle bigger mutant threats. This issue is truly put to the test when Raph and Casey cross paths with Slash and his new partner the Newtralizer.
44	18	"Pizza Face"	Sebastian Montes	Kevin Burke and Chris "Doc" Wyatt	Miki Brewster, Ben Li and Sheldon Vella	May 18, 2014	218	2.29
When living pizzas begin turning people into zombies, including Leo, Raph, Donnie, Splinter, and April, it's up to Mikey to save them from their leader, a pepperoni and mushroom pizza mutant named "Pizza Face".: From here until the season 2 finale, Leo is voiced by Dominic Catrambone.
45	19	"The Wrath of Tiger Claw"	Michael Chang	Christopher Yost	Adam Lucas, Samuel Montes and Ed Tadem	June 8, 2014	219	2.30
Tiger Claw returns and vows revenge on the Turtles and works with Karai on a ruse to locate their lair, but it fails when the truth about herself as Splinter and the late Tang Shen's only daughter Miwa, is revealed to her and she furiously turns against him and the Foot clan. Unfortunately for Karai, Shredder imprisons her in a cell now that she knows the truth about her parentage.: This is the last episode where Jason Biggs voices Leo.
46	20	"The Legend of the Kuro Kabuto"	Alan Wan	Doug Langdale	Michael Fong, Micah Gunnell and Rie Koga	June 15, 2014	220	1.87
Feeling ashamed of himself for losing Karai to Shredder like Splinter did, Leo talks the other Turtles to help him rescue her. Meanwhile, Anton Zeck, a professional thief in a high-tech energy suit, is hired by Ivan Steranko, a Russian arms dealer and artifact collector who is an old mafia business partner of Shredder's, to steal Shredder's helmet, the "Kuro Kabuto". When the Turtles accidentally come into possession of the Kabuto, however, they decide to use it to their advantage and trade it for Karai, eventually leading to an all-out battle between them, Zeck, and Shredder's forces to claim it.
47	21	"Plan 10"	Michael Chang	Henry Gilroy	Adam Lucas, Samuel Montes and Ed Tadem	June 22, 2014	221	2.13
When Raphael accidentally switches minds with a Kraang after he accidentally pierces a part of an Earth infiltration devices he must find a way out of the Technodrome and back to his body without being discovered before "Plan 10" goes into full effect.
48	22	"Vengeance Is Mine"	Sebastian Montes	Peter Di Cicco	Miki Brewster, Ben Li and Sheldon Vella	June 29, 2014	222	2.17
Leo stages a rescue for Karai against Splinter's wishes. While the mission is a success, Karai's knowledge of the truth makes her rush out to take her revenge on Shredder for killing her mother and lying to her for so long, leading to an unexpected turn of events. Because of Shredder's careless actions, Karai inadvertently falls into a vat of mutagen, transforming her into a mindless albino horned viper when Shredder originally planned to have the Turtles' fall in the mutagen instead. The battle ends with Stockman's lab burning down due to a fire setting during the battle. The turtles, Splinter, Stockman, Shredder and Tiger Claw escape and Karai disappears. The Turtles (particularly Leo) and Splinter are saddened by what happened and return home. Karai appears on a nearby rooftop, where it is revealed that she has partial control over her mutation, able to partially remain in human and snake form.
49	23	"A Chinatown Ghost Story"	Alan Wan	Randolph Heard	Michael Fong, Micah Gunnell and Rie Koga	September 12, 2014	223	1.33
The evil spirit of a powerful Shang dynasty martial artist named Ho Chan is released by the Purple Dragons. He uses them to kidnap April in order to drain her of her untapped mental energies, as well as her friend Irma's own vital energy to restore his physical form. Donnie and Casey have to work together to rescue the girls' and face Leo, Raph, and Mikey when Ho Chan turns them into his brainwashed-soldiers.
50	24	"Into Dimension X!"	Sebastian Montes	Doug Langdale	Miki Brewster, Ben Li and Sheldon Vella	September 19, 2014	224	1.70
After receiving a message from an aged Leatherhead that the Kraang have perfected the mutagen, Mikey heads to Dimension X to rescue him by using the portal the Turtles have. The others follow him, and they will need Mikey's expertise to figure out the Dimension in order to find the Kraang's fortress, which is guarded by the rock monsters Traag and Granitor, rescue Leatherhead and stop the Kraang's xenoforming plot.
51	25	"The Invasion"	Michael Chang and Alan Wan	Brandon Auman and John Shirley	Michael Fong, Micah Gunnell, Rie Koga, Adam Lucas, Samuel Montes and Ed Tadem	September 26, 2014	225	1.63
52	26	"The Invasion"	Michael Chang and Alan Wan	Brandon Auman and John Shirley	Michael Fong, Micah Gunnell, Rie Koga, Adam Lucas, Samuel Montes and Ed Tadem	September 26, 2014	226	1.63
Part 1: As a last resort at getting back at the Turtles and Splinter for Karai's mutation, Shredder and the Kraang join forces as the Kraang launch a full-scale Invasion on Earth. With the Kraang now attacking New York, Leo and Donnie argue over strategies for defeating the Kraang. Part 2: With their home destroyed by Irma, who was revealed to be the Kraang's second-in-command, Kraang Sub-prime, in disguise, and the mutagen greatly perfected, the Turtles, April, and Casey must survive the ongoing assault of the Kraang Invasion, while Leo goes head-to-head with Shredder's men and his army of foot-soldiers. Meanwhile, Splinter and Leatherhead go one-on-one with the Shredder himself.

== See also ==
- 2014 in television
