= Teenage Mutant Ninja Turtles (2012 TV series) season 3 =

Teenage Mutant Ninja Turtles
- Season 3
- Showrunner: Ciro Nieli
- Starring: Seth Green; Rob Paulsen; Sean Astin; Greg Cipes
- No. of episodes: 26

Release
- Original network: Nickelodeon
- Original release: October 3, 2014 – September 27, 2015

Season chronology
- ← Previous; Season 2 Next → Season 4

The third season of the 2012 Teenage Mutant Ninja Turtles series began airing on Nickelodeon on October 3, 2014, in the United States. On February 26, 2013, Nickelodeon ordered a third season of Teenage Mutant Ninja Turtles.

The third season tells the story of the Turtles, April O'Neil and Casey Jones, who are required to abandon their lair in the New York City sewers to Northampton, Massachusetts, to their eventual return home and driving out the Kraang and undo their hold on the hundreds of mutated humans.

== Plot ==
In the first half of the third season, after the events of the previous season, the turtles are recuperating at O'Neil's farmhouse. While dealing with multiple mutants, they also find a Kraang clone in the likeness of April's mother, leading them to realize that she possesses psychological abilities because the Kraang experimented on her mother when she was pregnant. They eventually return to New York and save Splinter who has become mindless and bring him back. They team up with the Mighty Mutanimals (Slash, Leatherhead, Dr. Rockwell, and Pigeon Pete) and save the Humans and New York from the Kraang.

The second half of the season focuses on the turtles and the Shredder trying to bring Karai back, the latter succeeds and creates a brain worm to control her, the turtles and Splinter eventually free her from Shredder's control but she is lost again.

At the end of the season, the turtles meet Zog, a Triceraton who is investigating Kraang activity on earth, due to lack of the air they breathe, he first mistakes the turtles as allies and leads them to realize that the Kraang are still active on earth. After finding his equipment and being able to breathe, Zog turns against the turtles and alerts the Triceraton Empire before falling to his doom. The turtles then meet Bishop, an Utrom who is the same species as Kraang and tells them about the history between Kraang and the Triceratons, that the two alien species fighting for control over Dimension X with the Triceratons gaining the upper hand until the Kraang used the black hole generator and destroyed their planet with a single fleet surviving, he then warns them that both the Kraang and Triceratons are plan to invade Earth and if the latter arrive after the former, they will destroy the planet. The turtles try to stop Kraang from rising the Technodrome but fail and the Triceratons destroy it with Kraang Prime and Kraang Subprime in it, they then try to activate the black hole generator on Earth, the turtles join with allies and enemies to prevent Earth's destruction but Shredder betrays them and kills Splinter for revenge, uncaring for the consequences. As the planet is being destroyed, the turtles are saved by a robot calling himself Professor Honeycutt, who offers them a chance to save their world.

== Production ==
Jason Biggs departed the role of Leonardo after the 18th episode of season 2 and was temporarily replaced by Dominic Catrambone. Seth Green assumed the role beginning in season 3; in the show's universe, the change of voice was explained due to Leonardo having wounded his vocal cords. At San Diego Comic-Con in 2014, new characters such as the Dream Beavers and Napoleon Bonafrog would be making appearances. Actor Robbie Rist, who previously voiced Michelangelo in the first three films, voiced Mondo Gecko in the season. Renae Jacobs, who voiced April O'Neil in the 1987–1996 television series, guest-starred as Mrs. O'Neil and an alien.

== Broadcast ==
The season debuted on Nickelodeon in Australia on February 7, 2015.

== Episodes ==
No. overall	No. in season	Title	Directed by	Written by	Storyboarded by	Original release date	Prod. code	US viewers (millions)
53	1	"Within the Woods"	Sebastian Montes	Brandon Auman	Miki Brewster, Ben Li and Sheldon Vella	October 3, 2014	301	1.42
Three months after being driven out of New York and narrowly escaping from Shredder and the Kraang, the gang take shelter at April's family farmhouse in Northampton, Massachusetts to recover and figure out how to stop the Kraang. The Turtles also deal with not having Splinter around, the possibility of Leo not making a full recovery, and a mysterious creature that is stalking the group.: Starting with this episode, Leo is voiced by Seth Green. This change is explained in-universe as the result of damage to his larynx.
54	2	"A Foot Too Big"	Michael Chang	Doug Langdale	Adam Lucas, Samuel Montes and Ed Tadem	October 10, 2014	302	1.31
After Donatello once again tries to impress April (this time with a music box), he discovers and befriends Bigfoot, who is being hunted by a collector named The Finger. Donatello then convinces the others to help protect it. However, Bigfoot (who is a girl) grows to have a crush on Donatello and tries to win him over. Donatello realizes that Bigfoot liking him has the same effect as him liking April.
55	3	"Buried Secrets"	Alan Wan	Mark Henry	Michael Fong, Micah Gunnell and Rie Koga	October 17, 2014	303	1.67
The Turtles discover a lost Kraang scout ship under the house and find April's lost mother. However, Mikey has suspicions that April's mother may not be who she appears to be. Even though no one believes him, they soon learn that she is actually a Kraang creature infused with the real Mrs. O'Neil's human DNA and memories.
56	4	"The Croaking"	Michael Chang	Kevin Burke and Chris "Doc" Wyatt	Adam Lucas, Samuel Montes and Ed Tadem	November 7, 2014	304	1.47
After getting in trouble for trashing the house, Michelangelo gets upset and flees. After meeting a member of the Punk Frogs named Napoleon Bonafrog, he unknowingly joins them in a plan to capture the humans and take over the nearby city. Guest Star: Jon Heder as Napoleon Bonafrog.
57	5	"In Dreams"	Sebastian Montes	Doug Langdale	Miki Brewster, Ben Li and Sheldon Vella	November 14, 2014	305	1.35
When the Turtles are trapped in their dreams by a brotherhood of outer-dimensional beings called the Dream Beavers, April tries to wake them up using her inherent psionic abilities, and Casey goes to find a man who holds the key to stopping the Beavers from draining the Turtles' life-force.
58	6	"Race With the Demon!"	Alan Wan	Gavin Hignight	Michael Fong, Micah Gunnell and Rie Koga	November 21, 2014	306	1.74
Casey and Donatello must put aside their differences and work together to build a hot rod when a mutant car called Speed Demon endangers them and their friends.
59	7	"Eyes of the Chimera"	Michael Chang	Greg Weisman	Adam Lucas, Samuel Montes and Ed Tadem	January 11, 2015	307	1.85
When a mutant Chimera (created by mutagen combining a falcon, a fish that it caught, and a worm that was in the fish's mouth) is created by Speed Demon's mutagen (from the previous episode), it kidnaps Casey, Raph, Mikey and Donnie, leaving April and Leo to stop it while overcoming their own disabilities; which is made even more difficult when April's mental link with the Chimera allows her to see through its eyes and feel its pain.
60	8	"Vision Quest"	Sebastian Montes	Todd Casey	Miki Brewster, Ben Li and Sheldon Vella	January 18, 2015	308	2.31
When the Turtles go to train in the woods to make them all more one with nature, they are visited by a spiritual manifestation of Splinter, who informs them that they must overcome their weaknesses by facing off against their enemies in a vision quest to prepare themselves for their return to New York.
61	9	"Return to New York"	Alan Wan	Brandon Auman	Michael Fong, Micah Gunnell and Rie Koga	January 25, 2015	309	1.85
Upon returning home to New York City, the Turtles discover that the city has been overrun with Kraang Droids and Foot Bots. As they travel through the Kraang filled city, they find out that Splinter is suffering from amnesia due to the injuries he got from his battle with Shredder. Splinter is then captured by the Foot Clan and held hostage by Stockman-Fly and three Shredder Mutants created from the DNA of Shredder and some crustaceans.
62	10	"Serpent Hunt"	Michael Chang	Randolph Heard	Adam Lucas, Samuel Montes and Ed Tadem	February 1, 2015	310	1.57
As Splinter feels disheartened without Karai back in the family, the Turtles search for her, but are confronted by Zeck and Steranko, who are also looking for Karai to exchange to Shredder for protection from the Kraang populace.
63	11	"The Pig and the Rhino"	Alan Wan	Brandon Auman	Steve Ahn, Michael Fong, Micah Gunnell and Rie Koga	March 8, 2015	311	1.81
After Donnie finishes a new batch of retro-mutagen in hopes of returning Karai back to normal, the Turtles set out with April and Casey to search for her again. They find themselves being hunted by Zeck and Steranko (who were mutated by Shredder into the common warthog and white rhinoceros mutants "Bebop and Rocksteady" at the end of the last episode) where they are sent to find Karai again as well.
64	12	"Battle for New York"	Michael Chang and Sebastian Montes	Brandon Auman and Mark Henry	Miki Brewster, Ben Li, Adam Lucas, Samuel Montes, Ed Tadem and Sheldon Vella	March 15, 2015	312	1.78
65	13	"Battle for New York"	Michael Chang and Sebastian Montes	Brandon Auman and Mark Henry	Miki Brewster, Ben Li, Adam Lucas, Samuel Montes, Ed Tadem and Sheldon Vella	March 15, 2015	313	1.78
Part 1: When the Turtles encounter a Kraang resistance team of mutants called "the Mighty Mutanimals" (consisting of Slash, Leatherhead, Dr. Tyler Rockwell's monkey form, and Pigeon Pete and backed by Jack J. Kurtzman), Leo and Slash butt heads over how to carry out a mission when Kraang Sub-Prime leads the Kraang in a plot to mutate the entire Earth with a giant mutagen-filled missile. Part 2: Working together alongside the Mighty Mutanimals, the Turtles must brave the bizarre, upside-down world of Dimension X to bring home the enslaved people of New York while fighting Kraang Sub-Prime and Mrs. Campbell.
66	14	"Casey Jones vs. the Underworld"	Sebastian Montes	Andrew Robinson	Miki Brewster, Ben Li and Sheldon Vella	March 22, 2015	314	1.85
Livid for being left behind by the Turtles to save New York with the Mighty Mutanimals (from the previous episode), Casey tries to prove that he can take on the criminal underworld on his own. However, he discovers that he is in way over his head, when the Shredder gets Manhattan's criminal underworld on the Foot Clan's side. Casey also goes head to head with the Purple Dragon's new and official leader Hun, as the Foot Clan plans to use a factory in the Purple Dragon's territory to further the Foot Clan's latest plot.
67	15	"The Noxious Avenger"	Alan Wan	Todd Casey	Steve Ahn, Micah Gunnell and Rie Koga	April 26, 2015	315	1.74
When Garson Grunge, a humble garbage man who had encounters with several mutants during his career as a sewer worker, is accidentally mutated into the garbage mutant "Muckman" during a face-off between the Turtles and Bebop and Rocksteady. In addition, his left eyeball gets a mind of its own when it takes on the name of Joe Eyeball. Muckman gains notoriety as New York City's "Monster Hero" after he saves a man from the Purple Dragons. However, Muckman blames the Turtles for his mutation. The Turtles' situation is complicated further not only when Splinter grounds them for nearly getting caught by a news crew that was following Muckman, but also when Bebop and Rocksteady trick Muckman into helping them find an ingredient for a mind-control serum.
68	16	"Clash of the Mutanimals"	Michael Chang	Henry Gilroy	Adam Lucas, Samuel Montes and Ed Tadem	May 3, 2015	316	1.57
With his mind-control serum completed, Shredder uses it to infect Slash and Dr. Tyler Rockwell. Under Shredder's control, they kidnap Raphael and infect him as well, intending to use them to kill the turtles and the mutanimals.
69	17	"Meet Mondo Gecko"	Sebastian Montes	Kevin Burke and Chris "Doc" Wyatt	Miki Brewster, Ben Li and Sheldon Vella	May 10, 2015	317	1.80
While hanging out together, Michelangelo and Casey meet a skateboarding leopard gecko mutant "Mondo Gecko". While Mikey makes quick friends with the mutant, Casey is suspicious of Mondo's true intentions as he is an errand person for Mr. X (an alias of Fishface).
70	18	"The Deadly Venom"	Alan Wan	Eugene Son	Steve Ahn, George Gipson and Rie Koga	May 17, 2015	318	1.70
With Karai brainwashed by Shredder's mind-control serum she begins hunting and poisoning the Turtles as well as April and Casey. Splinter teaches Leonardo a special healing mantra that can effectively counteract the potentially lethal venom of Snake Karai.
71	19	"Turtles in Time"	Michael Chang	Randolph Heard	Adam Lucas, Samuel Montes and Ed Tadem	August 2, 2015	319	1.65
When the Turtles encounter a clumsy Time Master in Training named Renet, they must help her in retrieving her time-controlling scepter from an evil Mutant Time Master known as Savanti Romero, in Medieval England.
72	20	"Tale of the Yokai"	Sebastian Montes	Brandon Auman	Miki Brewster, Ben Li and Sheldon Vella	August 9, 2015	320	1.37
Now trapped sixteen years in Tokyo, Japan's not-too-distant past, after an accident with Renet's Time Scepter, the Turtles encounter a sixteen-year younger Hamato Yoshi and Oroku Saki, in the middle of their escalated rivalry over Tang Shen's heart, and the infant Miwa's stolen life and future as Karai. Guest Star: Minae Noji as Tang Shen.
73	21	"Attack of the Mega Shredder!"	Alan Wan	Gavin Hignight	Steve Ahn, George Gipson and Rie Koga	August 16, 2015	321	1.78
The Turtles attempt to steal one of the Shredder's Worms in order to make a cure for the Mind-Control Serum, only for them to face Shredder's biggest mutant yet.
74	22	"The Creeping Doom"	Michael Chang	Peter Di Cicco	Adam Lucas, Samuel Montes and Ed Tadem	August 23, 2015	322	1.77
After Michelangelo fools around in his lab, an accident causes Donatello's Intelligence to drop rapidly, as well as revive both the Creep, and Snakeweed.
75	23	"The Fourfold Trap"	Sebastian Montes	Mark Henry	Miki Brewster, Ben Li and Sheldon Vella	September 13, 2015	323	1.60
After being kidnapped by the hypnotized Karai, the Turtles are placed in deadly traps that they must work together in order to escape. Splinter, in his efforts to save the turtles, is forced to face his daughter, Karai, in order to free her from Shredder's mind control.
76	24	"Dinosaur Seen in Sewers!"	Michael Chang	Todd Casey	Adam Lucas, Samuel Montes and Ed Tadem	September 20, 2015	324	1.82
Raphael meets and "befriends" a delusional Alien Dinosaur known as Zog, the Triceraton. However, after it attacks the Mutanimals, and is reputable for being feared by the Kraang, is there more to the savage alien dinosaur than meets the eye?
77	25	"Annihilation: Earth!"	Sebastian Montes and Alan Wan	Brandon Auman	Steve Ahn, Miki Brewster, George Gipson, Rie Koga, Ben Li and Sheldon Vella	September 27, 2015	325	1.43
78	26	"Annihilation: Earth!"	Sebastian Montes and Alan Wan	Brandon Auman	Steve Ahn, Miki Brewster, George Gipson, Rie Koga, Ben Li and Sheldon Vella	September 27, 2015	326	1.43
Part 1: After learning that the Earth is in danger of being invaded by both the Kraang in their repaired Technodrome and the Triceraton Empire, the Turtles, April, Casey, Leatherhead, and a Kraang rebel known as "Bishop" must work together to take out the Technodrome before the Triceratons arrive and wipe out the Earth. Part 2: Even after recruiting the Mutanimals and Muckman to help them, with Michelangelo kidnapped, and time running out for the Earth, the Turtles must stage a rescue for their youngest brother from the Triceraton Empire. Meanwhile, Splinter and the Shredder are forced to form an uneasy alliance to stop the Triceratons from activating a device that creates a lethal Black Hole that will swallow all of Earth. Though Shredder might also take advantage of this chaos.
