= Turtles of Grayskull =

2024 American comic book series

Publication information
- Publisher: Dark Horse Comics
- Format: Limited series
- Publication date: September 25, 2024
- No. of issues: 4

Creative team
- Written by: Tim Seeley
- Artist: Freddie E. Williams II
- Letterer: AndWorld Design
- Colorist: Andrew Dalhouse
- Editor: Brett Israel

Turtles of Grayskull is a comic book limited series written by Tim Seeley, drawn by Freddie E. Williams II, and colored by Andrew Dalhouse. The series features a storyline that crosses-over Mattel's Masters of the Universe with Nickelodeon's Teenage Mutant Ninja Turtles. It was first published as a minicomic series accompanying an offshoot of the same name of the Masters of the Universe action figure franchise, and then as an expanded series by Dark Horse Comics on September 25, 2024.

== Premise ==
When the Teenage Mutant Ninja Turtles came across Krang and Shredder making a deal with some otherworldly 'demon-mage' named Skeletor, things got hella-weird and they ended up in ETERNIA! It turns out, when you mix Ultrom mutagen with demon magic you get a nasty purple poison—and it's brought Eternia to the brink of chaos. So, Leo, Raph, Donnie, and Mikey are teaming up with the Masters of the Universe to kick some blue boney butt. The only problem is...He-Man is missing in action.

— Dark Horse Comics, official synopsis.

== Publication history ==
Turtles of Grayskull is a comic book limited series published by Dark Horse Comics, being a crossover event between Masters of the Universe by Mattel and Teenage Mutant Ninja Turtles by Paramount and Nickelodeon.

Writer Tim Seeley said, "As inevitable as a meet up between He-Man and the Turtles has felt, it took some time getting done! And now that it's here, I have a huge pile of newly purchased figures and a bunch of pages for what is one of the most awesome comics I've ever gotten to work on. To say Freddie and I approached this Dark Horse series with some screaming-our-heads-off-style enthusiasm is underselling it a bit. I can't wait until you get to read this."

Artist Freddie E. Williams II added, "He-Man and the Ninja Turtles? Tim and I have been discussing potential plots and ideas for a few years, and he still surprised me with an even cooler (unique) way to connect these worlds, and reconnect and connect again...in this bending world hopping, time-skipping approach. This crossover has a long lineage -- many of us fans have been bashing He-Man and the Ninja Turtles together since we were kids! And I'm honored and thrilled to draw it!"

The publication was preceded by a planned crossover comic project, titled He-Man/Teenage Mutant Ninja Turtles featuring the IDW versions of the Turtles, which Williams provided illustration sketches for. After a brief initial approval in 2019, the project was abruptly cancelled. In early 2024, a crossover toy line was started as an offshoot of the Origin action figure series, which, following a longstanding tradition with the MOTU franchise, incorporated accompanying minicomics illustrated by Williams.

The Dark Horse version published in September 2024 was scripted by Tim Seeley, and the illustrations were provided by Williams. However, the Dark Horse version's plot diverges from the minicomics following the events of the latter's first issue, pursuing an alternate storyline.

== Plot summary ==
=== Minicomics ===
On Eternia, the current tranquility in the city of Eternos is disrupted by a paradimensional incident alert from the Swamps of Gangoon. He-Man departs with Battle Cat, Ram Man and Moss Man to investigate, but are not heard from again. Several days later, Man-At-Arms, Teela and Roboto follow their trail to the swamps, where they are attacked by a strangely changed Trap-Jaw and a horde of big-jawed robots. Just before they are overwhelmed, a quartet of masked reptiloids suddenly appears and destroys the robots, allowing the Eternian heroes to defeat Trap-Jaw.

The reptiloids introduce themselves as the Teenage Mutant Ninja Turtles, denizens of Earth who have been trying to thwart another scheme hatched by their archenemies Shredder and Krang. By use of their Technodrome's interdimensional portal, the villains had detected a castle harboring an immense power and planned to harness it for their conquest plans. When the Turtles intervened, an explosion occurred which hurled all participants to Eternia, along with a sizeable supply of mutagen ("ooze"). Since the Turtles recognize the robots in Trap-Jaw's company, the heroes deduce that Shredder and Krang must have joined forced with Skeletor. In order to prepare for the confrontation, the Eternians invite the Turtles to Eternos, where Donatello upgrades Man-At-Arms and Teela's weaponry with turtle-themed armor and Roboto with additional parts, turning him into Metal-Boto.

Suddenly, Beast-Man appears in Eternos. He reports that Skeletor, Shredder and Krang have captured He-Man's team and used the ooze to mutate them and several of Skeletor's henchmen, causing him to desert before he could be mutated too. Despite suspecting that he is lying, Man-At-Arms and Teela agree that Beast-Man is their only chance for finding their missing companions. While Duncan and Donatello stay behind to finish their work on Roboto, Teela and the other Turtles follow Beast-Man, who leads them to a deserted arena, where - as expected - they run into an ambush set by their enemies, which includes He-Man, now a purple-skinned, raging berserker. Before thing come to the worst, Duncan and Roboto come to their aid, and while Roboto stalls pursuit, the rest of the heroes snatch the ooze and retreat to Castle Grayskull, where they hope that a cure can be found.

Inside Grayskull, the Turtles and the Eternian heroes surprisingly encounter Casey Jones and April O'Neil, who had followed the Turtles to their enemies' hideout, were caught in the same interdimensional rift and transported to the castle, where its powers bestowed April with a hawk-themed outfit, the ability to fly, and sorcerous abilities. The Sorceress of Grayskull explains that April is the key to resolving the problem with the mutagen; she also knows that He-Man hurled his Sword of Power away from him when he was mutated, but she has no idea where it is. To find it, they descend to the Dwell of Souls in the lower bowels of the castle, where April summons the Spirit of Grayskull in the form of Splinter, the Turtles' adopted father. "Splinter-Skull" (as dubbed by Michelangelo) tells them where to find the sword, but once the Turtles arrive there, they are ambushed first by a mutated Mer-Man, then by Skeletor and He-Man. He-Man and Leonardo lunge for the Power Sword, contacting it at the same time, and suddenly a power burst is released, which transports the Turtles and He-Man back to Grayskull and cures He-Man of his mutation.

Later on, Leonardo and He-Man, both magically disguised, infiltrate Skeletor's camp to break out and cure He-Man's captive friends Ram Man, Moss Man and Roboto. Skeletor masses his new mutant forces for a final assault on Grayskull when Krang betrays him, intent on seizing the castle's power all for himself. Unbeknownst to them, however, Shredder has forged his own secret alliance with Hordak, Skeletor's former mentor; the two villains ambush Krang from the battlements of Grayskull and spray the heroic warriors with mutagen. At that moment, Splinter-Skull intervenes by releasing a burst of power from the castle, which evicts the villains and neutralizes the mutagen. With the siege thwarted, the Turtles, April and Casey prepare to return to Earth.

However, the Turtles' return to Earth is delayed when Shredder remains elusive, and additional rumors of the Snake Men resurfacing begin to stir worry in the Eternians. While scouring the vicinity of Snake Mountain, Mekaneck and Clamp Champ are ambushed by Rattlor and a troop of Foot Ninja, all mutated, but rescued by the Turtles. Deciding to investigate the fortress, they are captured by Shredder, who has merged with Skeletor and is prepared to do the same with King Hiss as well, to unite the three powers of Eternia - Grayskull, Havoc and Serpos - in himself. And to the horror of the heroes, the merging is done, and Shredder emerges from his mutagen bath as a hideous, snake-like chimera.

In order to complete his plan - freeing Serpos and the rest of his Snakemen army from imprisonment - King Hiss has the six heroes cast into the heart of Snake Mountain as ritual sacrifices, followed by Ninjor, who is, as the "Warden of Serpos", to act as their executioner. After Leonardo wounds him, Ninjor, who is also infused with mutagen, polymorphs into a dragonman and renews his attacks. When Ninjor is unable to defeat them, Shredder in his impatience plunges himself into the pit and kills Ninjor, thereby completing the sacrifice and freeing Serpos' spirit, who possesses Shredders body. In this desperate situation, Michelangelo hits upon an inspiration and summons the Power of Grayskull into himself, which gives him the strength to hurl Shredder against King Hiss and his henchmen, knocking them all out and preventing Serpos' full liberation from his mystic prison. After reverting the Shredder back to his human form and some cleanup work, the Turtles say their new friends goodbye and return home to Earth.

=== Dark Horse Comics ===
The story begins with the Turtles contacting Splinter and April, who are still on Earth, through a dimensional window opened by Orko, telling them how they arrived on Eternia, only to find that the Shredder and Krang have joined forces with Skeletor and are preparing a massive attack of their mutated troops on Castle Grayskull. Man-at-Arms has organized a counterstrike by the Champions of Eternia, which the Turtles and their Neutrino friends Kala, Zak and Dask have decided to join.

As the deeply worried Sorceress watches, the two armies clash before the castle. Skeletor decides to unleash the mutated He-Man at his enemies, but He-Man instead slaughters both friends and foes before the mutagen's effect on him wears off and he turns back to Adam, who collapses in horror at what he's done. Upon witnessing what's happened, apprentice time mistress Renet Tilley decides to undo this gruesome outcome, but her defective time scepter causes her to be shifted back to a point of time in the history of the Turtles where they were forced to participate in a lethal gladiatorial contest on the Triceraton Homeworld. As the Turtles face the Triceration All-Star Team, Prime Leader Zanramon has He-Man enter the arena as an additional contestant. He-Man and the Turtles easily defeat the All-Stars, but then the Prime Leader sics the Monstroid, on loan from the Evil Horde, on them, forcing them and Renet to flee the Triceraton Homeworld.

After He-Man and the Turtles tell her how they ended up in the arena, Renet informs them of an anomaly where several timelines have tangled in a knot, triggered by the meeting between the mutants and the Eternians, and theorizes that in order to undo the mess, they have to prevent their teams' union from ever taking place. For this purpose, Renet deposits He-Man in New York to prevent Skeletor from contacting Shredder and Krang, but there he encounters Bebop, Rocksteady and Casey Jones. The Turtles are brought to Eternos, where they are beset by Teela and Man-At-Arms as intruders. Renet, while merging with the knot to follow it back to its original cause, ends up in the garden of the Foot Clan's dojo in Japan, where she runs into the yet un-mutated Splinter.

Casey brings He-Man to the Turtles's hideout, where the latter tells Splinter, April and Casey his story. Eager to confront the Shredder, He-Man storms off but is halted by Splinter, who reminds him that in order to confront the Shredder, he will need at least some basic instruction in ninjutsu to aid him against a master of this art. After a week of training, He-Man, Splinter, April and Casey infiltrate T.C.R.I. after having noticed some suspicious activity there. But they find that not only have the Shredder and Krang already formed their alliance with Skeletor, the Shredder has also prepared for the heroes' arrival and ambushes them along with Beast Man, Bebop and Rocksteady, the latter two joined into a two-headed chimera by mutagen infused with dark magic. Similarly, on Eternia, the Turtles join Mat-At-Arms and Teela in sneaking into Snake Mountain to look for Roboto, Ram Man and Moss Man, who have gone missing while scouting the perimeter of Eternia's dark hemishpere, only to be attacked by Skeletor, Krang, and their missing - and already mutated - friends.

In Earth's past, Renet witnesses Hamato Yoshi and Oroku Saki discussing the admission of a new student named Sekiryou to the Foot Clan. After Yoshi has expressed doubts about this new student's sincerity in joining the clan, Saki confronts Sekiryou, who admits that he is really subservient to Skeletor and as a result is scarred and expelled by Saki. Realizing that this is the event which caused the knot in the time continuum, Renet hurries off to undo it, only to run into Sekiryou, who now calls himself Ninjor. Renet tries to escape through a time portal, but Ninjor jumps after her. As they struggle in the midst of the time stream, reality is changed once more, and Renet and all main combatants - the Turtles, the Masters, Splinter, April, Casey, Shredder, Krang and Skeletor - are shunted into another dimension. After Renet manages to explain, it is revealed that Sekiryou was a former student of the Foot Clan until Skeletor conjured him - under his new identity of Ninjor - as a warrior from another world to assassinate He-Man, in which he failed. Now he intends to take revenge for all his defeats and disappointments, and for this purpose he stole Renet's original time scepter when she made a brief stopover on Eternia, and secretly arranged the alliance between Skeletor, Shredder and Krang to draw all his former masters and their loved ones to Eternia and have them massacred by the mutated He-Man. And with this forced gathering, this will be the final and decisive confrontation, with no way for Renet to reset events from this point again.

Just as these revelations are made, Ninjor opens a small portal and douses He-Man with the magically infused mutagen, turning him into a berserker once more. While the others engage He-Man to distract him until the mutagen wears off, Man-At-Arms, April, Shredder, Skeletor and Krang are attacked by the vengeful Ninjor. After he beats the men in the group to the ground, he douses himself with the mutagen, changing himself into a dragonman. Meanwhile, Michelangelo succeeds in seizing the Sword of Grayskull from He-Man, and Splinter uses it as a focus to remind He-Man of who and what he really is, accelerating the mutagen's degradation and returning him to his old self. Additionally, the Sorceress contacts April and bestows her with the Power of Grayskull. April uses her loaned power to confront Ninjor with the fact that Ninjor fears himself as his greatest enemy, so in order to train himself for this battle, he had killed all his own temporal counterparts. Ninjor tries to escape, but He-Man and the Turtles catch up with him and knock him out with one simultaneous blow.

With Ninjor's defeat, Shredder and Krang flee back to their own dimension, abandoning Skeletor, who is arrested. After curing their remaining mutated friends and enemies, and Ninjor getting imprisoned in the Nexus of All Realities, the Turtles and their friends take their goodbye from the Masters and return to Earth. Renet, observing all of this, now has the opportunity to sever the last remaining time strand linking the fates of the Turtles and Masters together, thus totally nullifying all the adventures and experiences they've had together; and it is exactly for that reason that Renet decides not to undo this connection.

== See also ==
Other crossovers

- Batman/Teenage Mutant Ninja Turtles (DC Comics)
- He-Man/ThunderCats (DC Comics)
- Teenage Mutant Ninja Turtles/Usagi Yojimbo (IDW Publishing)
