= Teenage Mutant Ninja Turtles (IDW Publishing) =

Ongoing American comic book series

- The cover of issue number 2. Art by Dan Duncan; colors by Ronda Pattison.

Publication information
- Publisher: IDW Publishing
- Schedule: Monthly
- Format: Ongoing series
- Genre: Superhero fiction Science fantasy Supernatural fiction
- Publication date: Vol. 1.: August 2011 – April 2024; Vol. 2.: July 2024 –
- No. of issues: 348 (as of July 2026)

Creative team
- Written by: Kevin Eastman; Tom Waltz; Bobby Curnow; Sophie Campbell; Ian Flynn; Erik Burnham; Paul Allor; Jason Aaron
- Artist(s): Kevin Eastman (8–11, 13–15 2012 Annual, 16–17, 19–28, 30–37 2014 Annual, 38–48); Dan Duncan (1–12, 23); Andy Kuhn (13–16, 23); Ben Bates (17–20, 23); Mateus Santolouco (5, 22–28, 33–36, 38–40, FCBD 2015, 45–50, 56–58, 65, 67–70, 75) (23, 29–32, 66); Cory Smith (37, 41–44, 48, 73–75); Ken Garing (51, 52); Michael Dialynas (53–55); Dave Wachter (59–64, 71–72); Damian Couceiro (75–78); Chris Johnson (75); Brahm Revel (79)
- Colorist: Ronda Pattison (1–150)

Teenage Mutant Ninja Turtles is an ongoing American comic book series published by IDW Publishing. Debuting in August 2011, it was the first new comic incarnation of the Turtles to debut after the franchise's sale to Nickelodeon in October 2009. It is the fifth comic book series in the franchise's publication history and serves as a reboot of the franchise's story and characters.

The IDW Turtles series reimagines the franchise's titular characters—brothers Leonardo, Donatello, Raphael, and Michelangelo—as sons of Hamato Yoshi, a member of the Foot Clan led by Oroku Saki in feudal Japan. When Yoshi leaves the Clan, Saki (who will later be known as Shredder) murders Yoshi and his four sons. In modern times, the spirits of Yoshi and his sons are reincarnated as a rat and four turtles, respectively, in a research laboratory owned by Baxter Stockman, a scientist who has secretly allied himself with the extraterrestrial Krang. After coming in contact with the alien mutagen, Yoshi and the turtles are transformed into intelligent, humanoid beings. Living in the sewers, Yoshi (now called Splinter), remembers his past life and begins to train the turtles in the art of ninjutsu. Allying themselves with April O'Neil and Casey Jones, they are threatened by various foes old and new.

The initial creative team on the IDW series consisted of Turtles co-creator Kevin Eastman, who collaborated on the plot and the page layouts, writer Tom Waltz, and artist Dan Duncan. In 2017, it became the longest-running comic book series in the franchise's history, surpassing Archie Comics' Teenage Mutant Ninja Turtles Adventures, which ran from 1988 to 1995. Starting from issue #101, writer and artist Sophie Campbell took over as the sole lead writer before the series was relaunched in 2024 with Jason Aaron taking the mantle.

== Publication history ==
=== 2011–2024: original series ===
In April 2011, IDW Publishing acquired the license to publish new collections of older Teenage Mutant Ninja Turtles comics from Nickelodeon, as well as a new ongoing series. The first issue of the new series was released on August 24 that year. Turtles co-creators Kevin Eastman and Tom Waltz wrote the book, with Eastman and Dan Duncan providing art. In 2017, issue #73 of the main ongoing series was published, making it the longest-running comic in the franchise's history, surpassing Archie Comics' Teenage Mutant Ninja Turtles Adventures. In 2019, issue #100 of the comic was published, concluding the eight-part "City at War" arc. Starting with issue #101, series writer and artist Sophie Campbell took over as the sole lead writer for the book.

=== 2024: relaunch ===
It was announced on January 12, 2024, that the current volume would end with issue #150 and a new volume would launch in July 2024; with Jason Aaron taking over as the head writer. The first five issues of the new series were each drawn by a different artist (Joëlle Jones, Rafael Albuquerque, Cliff Chiang, Chris Burnham, and Darick Robertson respectively); with the first four issues spotlighting a different turtle (Raphael, Michelangelo, Leonardo, and Donatello, respectively) before having them reunite in the fifth. Following these issues, Juan Ferreyra would then draw the second story arc beginning with issue 6.

== Plot ==
=== Volume I ===
==== Issues #1–100 ====
Hamato Yoshi is a member of the Foot Clan led by Oroku Saki during Japan's feudal period. After seeing Saki act ruthlessly, Yoshi leaves the Clan and is marked by the clan as a traitor, and Saki orders Yoshi's entire family to be put to death. Yoshi's wife, Tang Shen, is attacked and severely wounded by the clan's ninjas, and with her last breath, she beseeches Yoshi to protect himself and the children. He flees with the boys and remains on the run for several years. Saki, who will later be known as Shredder, eventually finds Yoshi and his children and murders them all.

Centuries later, Yoshi and his sons' spirits are reincarnated in modern times as a gray rat and four green turtles, respectively, in a research laboratory called Stock Gen, owned by Baxter Stockman, a scientist who has secretly allied himself with the extraterrestrial Krang. An intern at Stock Gen, April O'Neil, names the turtles after Renaissance artists: Leonardo, Michelangelo, Donatello, and Raphael. Members of the Foot Clan break into the facility to steal an alien mutagen. The animals are taken by mistake, and when they and the stolen mutagen get lost in the sewer, they are covered with the spilled mutagen and transformed into intelligent, humanoid beings.

Yoshi, now called Splinter, remembers his past life and begins to train the turtles in the art of ninjutsu. Unfortunately, the seemingly trivial event which led to the creation of the Turtles and Splinter is part of an escalating conflict between several powers trying to take control of the Earth:

- The Foot Clan, with their leader Shredder, who has survived into the modern age due to the machinations of the shape-shifting witch Kitsune, and having new recruits such as Jennika, Alopex, Koya, and Bludgeon
- The Utrom warlord Krang, who plans to xenoform Earth into a new home for the last survivors of his race
- Old Hob, a mutant alley cat embittered by his experiences with humanity, initiates acts of terrorism to elevate mutantkind as the new masters of the Earth
- The zealous government agent John Bishop, leader of the Earth Protection Force, who seeks to eradicate mutantkind and aliens
- The mysterious Madam Null and her enterprise Null Group, a business conglomerate with its hands in many ventures and ties to other dimensions, deliberately create mutants as a slave workforce
- A mysterious Pantheon of immortal demigods, some of whom attempt to subvert humanity to their will as they once did in bygone times.

Finding new allies as they go, the Turtles are forced to strive against enemies and save the world from destruction as this many-fold conflict begins to spin out of control. The conflict culminates when Kitsune, a member of the Pantheon, attempts to resurrect the Dragon to end humanity, which the Turtles and their allies attempt to thwart, leading to the death of Splinter and Shredder's redemption.

==== Issues #101–150: Rebirth ====
With a mutagen bomb attack by Hob on the New York populace during Baxter Stockman's inauguration as the city's new mayor, the world's public is made aware of the existence of mutants. A ghetto called Mutant Town is erected in the heart of Manhattan to quarantine them, with Hob and his Mutanimals exercising loose political control over its inhabitants. The Turtles and their friends unite to make Mutant Town both a better place to live in and a hub of tolerance and communication with the outside world, but new conflicts begin to emerge:

- Zom becomes pregnant and gives birth to a daughter, hailing a new era for the Triceratons, but also stirring hostility in the radical Utrom Ch'rell
- Lita, a mutant albino turtle child the Turtles take in, her future self is revealed to become a time traveler under time mistress Renet and has traveled to the present to stop the Turtles from splitting up in the future
- The Punk Frogs, a street gang of mutant frogs, attack the Turtles and burn the dojo, believing that they took away one of their members, Bonnie
- A mad mutant surgeon by the name of Jasper Barlow experiments on mutants to make them more human, kidnapping Bonnie as part of her experiments (who becomes Venus, a turtle with psychic powers) and eventually resorting to inhumane methods to become human again
- The Rat King, a member of the Pantheon, is eager to see his family's power game brought to a conclusion and attempts to unleash the Armageddon Game upon the world, a conflict that involves every major character up to that point

The outcome of the Armageddon Game is the downfall of both Krang and Ch'rell, the destruction of Mutant Town's borders, and the banishment of all the Pantheons from the world. During it, Donatello travels to the future and discovers Armaggon, a monster that can devour and erase timelines. He becomes obsessed with stopping the monster and inadvertently creates it while traveling through space and time. With Venus' help and sacrifice, Donatello is able to stop Armaggon and ensure that his family won't be erased from history.

=== Volume II ===
After a falling out and parting ways, Raphael becomes a drifter and eventually ends up in San Quentin Prison, Michelangelo becomes an actor in Japan, Leonardo seeks enlightenment through yogic living, and Donatello gets captured and put in a safari with other mutants while reeling from the trauma he endured after fighting Armaggon. Framed for murdering the warden of the prison Raphael was incarcerated in, the Turtles are forced to come together as a family once again and are eventually exonerated by April, their allies, and supporters while also dealing with problems including:

- Hieronymus Hale, a lawyer, is placed in charge of New York by Karai as the new District Attorney after his parents were killed by mutants, and he erects a dictatorial regime in the city until he is publicly exposed by the Turtles and mutated by Karai for drawing too much public attention to the Turtles instead of merely distracting them.
- Karai herself strives to learn more about magic and the supernatural to defeat those she perceives as challengers to her rulership of the Foot Clan, including the Turtles. To this purpose, she allows herself to be possessed by an enigmatic being she calls The Wanderer, which results in a constant struggle for her mind.
- The Shredder returns from an extradimensional sojourn, only to learn that a former protegee and the Dog Star Clan attempt to usurp control over the New York Foot Clan, forcing him to join forces with former enemies to reunite the Foot Clan to meet threats from beyond the Earth.
- Jennika dons a mechanical suit and becomes the vigilante Nightwatcher, unraveling a crime ring taking advantage of the disadvantaged civilians of Mutant Town, until the suit—actually a golem—develops a mind of its own.
- Hob is trying to establish a new mutant colony on North Brother Island.
- After Splinter helps his sons from the beyond in their time of need, the Turtles try to contact him, thereby accidentally drawing him back to the world of the living. Driven by his love for his sons and visions of their prospective future, Splinter assumes the identity of an ujigami and begins eliminating threats to his family's safety—including one of their oldest and best friends.
- Savanti Romero, a being from an alternate reality, takes over the Battle Nexus in order to eliminate the Turtles, as well as their alternate counterparts, using enemies from their past, present, and alternate realities, including Slash, Ninjara, Alopex, the Mirage incarnation of the Shredder, and the 2012 incarnation of Metalhead.
- Casey Jones encounters Jack Marlin, an unscrupulous industrialist and hobby hunter, who is harvesting a rejuvenation serum called Nostrum from the bodies of dead mutants, and must contend with Ludovic, Marlin's snow leopard mutant henchman, who desperately seeks acceptance with Marlin's family.
- The meddling by the Turtles, Karai, the Foot Clan witch Shinigami and Baxter Stockman with the barrier between life and death results, next to Tang Shen's return to the world of the living, in a breach through which the spirits of the dead threaten to invade Earth.

== Comics ==
=== Ongoing ===
Title	Issue(s) (As of January 2025)	Start date	End date	Note
Teenage Mutant Ninja Turtles (Vol. 1)	1–150	August 24, 2011	April 24, 2024	First ongoing series about the Turtles fighting threats alongside their allies.
Teenage Mutant Ninja Turtles Universe	1–25	August 31, 2016	August 1, 2018	Former ongoing series focusing on characters outside the story told in the main run
Teenage Mutant Ninja Turtles: Saturday Morning Adventures (Vol. 2)	1–41	May 31, 2023	September 23, 2026	An adaptation of the 1987 cartoon series and a follow-up to the Saturday Morning Adventures miniseries which takes place after the events of season 7 and before the events of season 8.
Teenage Mutant Ninja Turtles (Vol. 2)	1–	July 24, 2024	-	Second ongoing series and a relaunch for the comics.
Shredder	1–	August 27, 2025	-	Spinoff ongoing series to volume 2 focusing on the Shredder having returned to Earth to reclaim the Foot Clan.

=== Mini-series ===
Title	Issues	Start date	End date	Note
Micro-Series	1–8	December 7, 2011	September 5, 2012	A series of one-shot issues focusing on individual characters. Featured are the Turtles, as well as Splinter, Casey Jones, April O'Neil, and the Fugitoid.
Micro-Series: Villains	1–8	April 17, 2013	December 4, 2013	A second series of one-shots featuring the main villains at the time, including Krang, Baxter Stockman, Old Hob, Alopex, Karai, Hun, Bebop and Rocksteady, and Shredder.
Secret History of the Foot Clan	1–4	January 9, 2013	March 20, 2013	Miniseries telling the story of the formation of the Foot Clan and its connection to mystic forces, which the Turtles slowly discover in the present day.
Utrom Empire	1–3	January 22, 2014	March 19, 2014	Focuses on Krang, Professor Honeycutt and Baxter Stockman, as their struggles against each other put the last of the Utrom race into dire peril, as well as the story about the last days of the titular Utrom empire.
Turtles in Time	1–4	June 18, 2014	September 17, 2014	A follow-up on the 2014 annual. Due to a lingering aftereffect of their adventure in the Battle Nexus, the Turtles end up popping through several critical points in the time continuum where their action will prove decisive for their own past and future.
Mutanimals	1–4	February 25, 2015	June 3, 2015	A limited series in which Old Hob and his Mutanimals clash with Madame Null, who wishes to exploit mutantkind as a slave force for her business.
Casey & April	1–4	June 17, 2015	September 23, 2015	While going on a road trip, April O'Neil and Casey Jones get ensnared by the schemings of the Rat King, but find an unexpected ally in his sister Aka.
Bebop & Rocksteady Destroy Everything!	1–5	June 1, 2016	June 29, 2016	A story arc detailing the chaotic adventures Bebop and Rocksteady engage in after they get their hands on Renet's Time Scepter, in which course their violent antics threaten to unravel the fabric of time itself.
Dimension X	1–5	August 2, 2017	August 30, 2017	A tie-in to the Trial of Krang story arc (issues #73 to #75), the Turtles and their Neutrino friends must travel throughout Dimension X looking for material witnesses against Krang whilst trying to outwit the bounty hunter Hakk-R, who was hired by Krang to eliminate said witnesses.
Bebop & Rocksteady Hit the Road	1–5	August 1, 2018	August 29, 2018	After the events of Bebop & Rocksteady Destroy Everything, the two titular characters try to find their way back to New York, leaving their habitual trail of chaos and destruction in their wake.
Macro-Series	1–4	September 26, 2018	December 19, 2018	Extra-large stories focusing on each main turtle in the buildup to the main run's 100th issue.
Shredder in Hell	1–5	January 16, 2019	December 4, 2019	A miniseries and tie-in with the City at War story arc (issues #93 to #100), Oroku Saki, once again in hell, is offered a chance to reconcile with his former friend Hamato Yoshi and redeem himself by challenging The Dragon, the allfather of the Pantheon, before Kitsune can summon him to Earth.
Jennika	1–3	February 26, 2020	June 24, 2020	Desperate to reverse her unwanted mutation, Jennika teams up with her ex-boyfriend Silas and his shifty friend Ivan to try and procure a cure; but soon she finds out that this quest is far too easy to be true.
Jennika II	1–6	November 4, 2020	April 14, 2021	A two-part follow-up on the first Jennika limited series. In the first part, "Monsters", Jennika teams up with Ivan once more to neutralize a new menace to the inhabitants of Mutant Town. In the second part, "Redemption", Jennika is forced to confront a ghost from her past as a Foot Assassin in order to find closure.
The Armageddon Game: Opening Moves	1–2	July 13, 2022	August 24, 2022	In order to counter the Rat King's looming "game" of chaos, Oroku Saki and Kitsune intrude upon the memories of the mad demigod's allies to discover their most critical weaknesses.
The Armageddon Game	1–8	September 28, 2022	July 5, 2023	A story arc directly tying in with issues #133 to #139, it centers on the Turtles gathering the allies they need to thwart the Rat King's insidious "game" of destruction.
Teenage Mutant Ninja Turtles: Saturday Morning Adventures	1–4	October 5, 2022	January 25, 2023	Adaptation and continuation of the 1987 cartoon series to celebrate its 35th anniversary. Later expanded to its own ongoing series.
The Armageddon Game-The Alliance	1–6	November 9, 2022	April 19, 2023	A tie-in to the Armageddon Game story arc, Karai gathers a group of unlikely allies to expose the sinister alliance that the Rat King has forged with some of the Turtles' deadliest enemies.
TMNT Sourcebook	1–4	February 21, 2024	August 14, 2024	Guidebook to the world of the IDW comics.
The Untold Destiny of the Foot Clan	1–5	March 20, 2024	July 17, 2024	Focuses on Karai discovering secrets about the Oroku family on her mission to rebuild the Foot Clan.
Black, White & Green	1–4	May 8, 2024	August 28, 2024	Anthology series celebrating the series' 40th anniversary, using only Black, White, and various shades of Green.
Teenage Mutant Ninja Turtles: Nightwatcher	1–7	August 14, 2024	April 9, 2025	Spinoff miniseries to volume 2 featuring Jennika as the Vigilante Nightwatcher.
Teenage Mutant Ninja Turtles: Mutant Nation	1–9	September 18, 2024	August 13, 2025	Spinoff miniseries to volume 2 focusing on stories beyond the main run, using the same format as Universe.
Casey Jones	1–6	September 10, 2025	April 1, 2026	Spinoff miniseries to volume 2 focusing on Casey Jones. After recovering from being shot by Hieronymus Hale, Casey discovers a new sense of purpose as he chases after the source of a superserum circulated among the New York street gangs and protects mutants from the predations of fanatic hunter Jack Marlin.
Battle Nexus	1–5	December 24, 2025	February 18, 2026	A bi-weekly mini-series event with the Turtles enter a multidimensional tournament facing allies and enemies from all times and universes such as Alopex, Shredder from Mirage, Metalhead from 2012 animated series, a resurrected Slash and new character Umeko.

=== One-shots and annuals ===
Title	Release Date	Note
Annual 2012	October 31, 2012	A prelude to the "City Fall" story arc (issues #22-28) in which the Turtles get embroiled in the start of a violent turf war between the Foot Clan and the rivalling upstart Savate Ninja.
Annual 2014	August 20, 2014	A ones-shot story in which the Turtles are whisked away to the Battle Nexus, where they first meet Renet and must prove their mettle to survive the Nexus' bloodthirsty gladiator fights.
30th Anniversary Special	May 21, 2014	Anthology featuring historical content and stories from each major comic incarnation of the Turtles, the Mirage, Archie, Image/Volume 3 and 4, and IDW runs.
Free Comic Book Day 2015	April 4, 2015	A FCBD special issue containing the story "Prelude to Vengeance" as an introduction to the Vengeance story arc (issues #45 to #50).
Deviations	March 30, 2016	Part of a special event depicting "what-if" scenarios of various comic series. In a deviation of the City Fall arc, all of the Turtles get captured and brainwashed under Shredder's control, forcing various other characters to rebel against the Shredder.
Free Comic Book Day 2017	May 5, 2017	A prelude to the "Trial of Krang" story arc and the Dimension X miniseries, first introducing the character Hakk-R.
TMNT Day Sampler	October 25, 2018	Sampler comic distributed for free recapping issues 1–73 on the day of Issue 75's release.
IDW 20/20	January 16, 2019	Part of a multi-comic special celebrating IDW's 20th anniversary: Various series were given non-canon one-shot issues depicting the characters 20 years in the past or future. In this issue, the Turtles, 20 years in the future, are caught in a war with the Utroms which threaten to destroy Earth once again.
Free Comic Book Day 2019	May 4, 2019	Contains two short stories: "Casualty of War", an extension of the City at War story arc which leads up to Jennika's mutation into a Turtle; and "Road to 100", a recap spanning issues #1 to #93.
Annual 2020	July 29, 2020	A short story featuring the Rat King's search for worthy chess pieces to use in his upcoming Armageddon Game.
Annual 2021	July 28, 2021	A prelude to the "Armageddon Game" story arc in which the Rat King attempts - and fails - to gain the assistance of his other siblings against the Turtles.
Annual 2022	March 30, 2022	Features a side story in which the Turtles must confront a life-leeching monster and their own doubts and fears.
Free Comic Book Day 2022	May 7, 2022	A prelude to the "Armageddon Game" storyline, retelling of the very first story of the Mirage run with dopplegangers of the Turtles.
Splintered Fate	May 4, 2023 (digital); August 16, 2023 (print)	Promotional comic to tie into the video game of the same name.
Annual 2023: Out of Time	July 12, 2023	Taking place after "Armageddon Game," an elderly Raph travels to the present to stop Donatello from creating a machine that will destroy the multiverse.
Saturday Morning Adventures: Endless Summer	August 30, 2023	Part of a series of one-shots featuring IDW Comics characters going on summertime adventures.
Free Comic Book Day 2024	May 4, 2024	Includes two stories: A prelude to the Nightwatcher ongoing series and a short story about a typical "quiet" day in the Turtles' life.
Teenage Mutant Ninja Turtles Alpha	June 5, 2024	Features two stories to bridge the gap between the first volume series and the 2024 relaunch; Long Way From Home, which stars Donatello, and Monster Island, which stars Old Hob.
40th Anniversary Comics Celebration	July 10, 2024	Anthology celebrating the 40th anniversary of the franchise. Features talent from throughout the entire comics and animated series run and includes stories from all the comics and animated series' incarnations of the Turtles throughout history.
Annual 2025	October 29, 2025	Taking place after the events of issue 12 and preludes the Battle Nexus series. After their victory over Hieronymus Hale, the Turtles take a moment to reflect on the year which they spent apart, with Leonardo recounting a tale which made him realize what his brothers really mean to him.

=== Crossovers ===
==== Batman/Teenage Mutant Ninja Turtles ====
A crossover series with the Teenage Mutant Ninja Turtles and Batman from DC Comics.

Title	Issue(s) (As of May 2024)	Start date	End date	Note
Batman/Teenage Mutant Ninja Turtles	1–6	December 9, 2015	May 11, 2016	A crossover limited series illustrated by Freddie Williams II, which pitches the Turtles and the Dark Knight against an alliance of the deadliest criminals of two universes. Later adapted into an animated film.
Batman/Teenage Mutant Ninja Turtles Adventures	1–6	November 6, 2016	May 10, 2017	Crossover between Batman: The Animated Series and the 2012 incarnation of the Turtles.
Batman/Teenage Mutant Ninja Turtles II	1–6	December 6, 2017	April 18, 2018	A sequel series in which Donatello and Bane accidentally switch places in their respective realities, and the Turtles and the Bat Family must reunite to prevent Bane from taking over New York.
Batman/Teenage Mutant Ninja Turtles III	1–6	May 1, 2019	October 2, 2019	A third sequel series featuring a story arc in which Krang messes with both the Turtles' and Batman's histories, creating a merged reality in which Batman becomes part of the Turtles' family.

==== Mighty Morphin Power Rangers/Teenage Mutant Ninja Turtles ====
A crossover miniseries focused on the Teenage Mutant Ninja Turtles and the Boom! Comics version of the Power Rangers.

Title	Issue(s)	Start date	End date	Note
Mighty Morphin Power Rangers/Teenage Mutant Ninja Turtles	1–5	December 4, 2019	June 17, 2020	A crossover story in which the first team of Power Rangers join forces with the Turtles to combat an unholy alliance between the Shredder and Rita Repulsa.
Mighty Morphin Power Rangers/Teenage Mutant Ninja Turtles II	1–5	December 28, 2022	May 3, 2023	In this sequel series, Krang and Rita Repulsa invade Earth to seize the power of the Rangers' tokens, and the Turtles and Rangers must contend with an enemy turned ally and a friend turned enemy.
Mighty Morphin Power Rangers/Teenage Mutant Ninja Turtles III	1-5	August 13, 2025	March 25, 2026	In this sequel series, With Rita and Krang defeated, the bad guys aren't cutting the Rangers and Turtles no slack! Lord Zedd and Shredder have a new plan to take down the radical teen heroes and if they don't act carefully, they may just succeed.

==== Usagi Yojimbo ====
Crossovers with the Usago Yojimbo series by Stan Sakai, who have frequently crossed over with the Turtles in other media.

Title	Issue(s) (As of May 2024)	Start date	End date	Note
Teenage Mutant Ninja Turtles/Usagi Yojimbo: Namazu or the Big Fish Story	One-shot	July 26, 2017		The first crossover of the IDW Turtles with Usagi Yojimbo, as the continuation of a longstanding tradition between the two franchises.
Teenage Mutant Ninja Turtles/Usagi Yojimbo: WhereWhen	1–5	April 12, 2023	July 26, 2023	A follow-up on the first crossover with Usagi Yojimbo and a prelude to the Usagi Yojimbo: Senso and Space Usagi mini-series, the Turtles are thrown back in time and reality while chasing Dr. Wherewhen, a dangerous time-travelling cyborg and conqueror, and must enlist the aid of Miyamoto Usagi and his friends to stand a chance of ever returning home.
Teenage Mutant Ninja Turtles/Usagi Yojimbo: Saturday Morning Adventures	One-shot	June 12, 2024		A tie-in crossover story with the Saturday Morning Adventures series.

==== Other crossovers ====
Title	Issue(s) (As of May 2024)	Start date	End date	Note
Infestation 2: Teenage Mutant Ninja Turtles	1–2	March 7, 2012	March 21, 2012	Part of the IDW Crossover event of the same name where various characters from IDW series face off against Lovecraftian monsters.
The X-Files: Conspiracy-Teenage Mutant Ninja Turtles	One-shot	February 12, 2014		A non-canon crossover story and part of The X-Files: Conspiracy limited series detailing a clash of the Turtles and the Lone Gunmen against the Chaney Vampires.
Teenage Mutant Ninja Turtles/Ghostbusters	1–4	October 22, 2014	January 25, 2015	A crossover limited series celebrating the 30th anniversary of both franchises. The Turtles are displaced into the Ghostbusters' reality due to a teleportation mishap, and the two teams must join forces when Chi-You, a member of the Pantheon, tries to take humanity under his control.
Teenage Mutant Ninja Turtles/Ghostbusters II	1–5	November 1, 2017	November 29, 2017	A sequel series to the first Ghostbusters crossover, and an add-up to the Trial of Krang story arc. Whilst attempting to return to Earth from Dimension X, the Turtles are trapped in the spirit world by their late adversary Darius Dun and must enlist the Ghostbusters' help to break free.
Teenage Mutant Ninja Turtles vs Street Fighter	1–5	June 7, 2023	November 8, 2023	A crossover story featuring characters from the Street Fighter video game franchise.
Teenage Mutant Ninja Turtles x Stranger Things	1–4	July 12, 2023	October 25, 2023	A crossover story pitting the protagonists from Stranger Things and the Mirage Ninja Turtles against the denizens of the Upside Down.
Masters of the Universe/Teenage Mutant Ninja Turtles: Turtles of Grayskull	1–4	September 25, 2024	April 16, 2025	A series of mini-comics incorporated into a crossover line tied with the Masters of the Universe: Origin action figures. Preceded by a planned but unpublished He-Man/Teenage Mutant Ninja Turtles limited series. Both series were illustrated by Freddie Williams II.
Teenage Mutant Ninja Turtles x Naruto	1–4	November 20, 2024	May 21, 2025	A crossover with Naruto, to be illustrated by Indonesian comic artist Hendry Prasetya.
Teenage Mutant Ninja Turtles x Godzilla	1-5	November 12, 2025	April 1, 2026	A crossover with the Turtles face off against Godzilla.

=== Roninverse ===
A separate continuity focusing on a cyberpunk dystopia several years in the future, based on an idea originally conceived for the Mirage Comics.

Title	Issue(s) (As of May 2024)	Start date	End date	Note
Teenage Mutant Ninja Turtles: The Last Ronin	1–5	October 28, 2020	April 27, 2022	A lone Michaelangelo seeks vengeance for the death of his friends and family in a futuristic New York City under the control of Shredder's grandson, Oroku Hiroto.
The Last Ronin: Lost Years	1–5	January 25, 2023	August 2, 2023	Tells the story of Casey Marie Jones, April O'Neils daughter, raising a new generation of Ninja Turtles (Uno, Moja, Odyn, and Yi), as well as Mikey's 15-year journey to kill gang leader Death Worm.
The Last Ronin: Lost Day Special	One-shot	July 19, 2023		Follows April O'Neil traveling the city with the new Ninja Turtles to obtain something for a friend while Casey Marie is out on a date.
The Last Ronin II: Re-Evolution	1–5	March 6, 2024	April 30, 2025	Follows the new Ninja Turtles as they fight against forces that threaten to destroy the city.
The Last Ronin: Training Day	One-shot	July 15, 2026		Set between issues 3 and 4 of the original series, it follows Michaelangelo's efforts to train Casey Marie over a 24-hour period.

=== TV show adaptations ===
Title	Issue(s) (As of May 2024)	Start date	End date	Note
Teenage Mutant Ninja Turtles: New Animated Adventures	1–24	May 2013	June 24, 2015	Adaptation of the 2012 show.
Teenage Mutant Ninja Turtles: Amazing Adventures	1–14	August 2015	September 2016	Reboot of the New Animated Adventures series.
Rise of the Teenage Mutant Ninja Turtles	0–5	July 18, 2018	February 6, 2019	Adaptation of the 2018 show of the same name.
Rise of the Teenage Mutant Ninja Turtles: Sound Off!	1–3	July 24, 2019	September 25, 2019	Limited issue spinoff of the Rise comic series, where the Turtles encounter a trio of mutant miscreants called The Silent G's.
Tales of the Teenage Mutant Ninja Turtles	1–6	October 15, 2025	May 20, 2026	Adaptation and continuation of the Tales of the Teenage Mutant Ninja Turtles TV series.
Tales of the Teenage Mutant Ninja Turtles: Coastal Chaos	1-3	September 9, 2026	November 18, 2026	Sequel to the previous Tales comic.

== Chronological comic order ==
This is a chronological listing of the in-continuity comics in which the timeline of events developed.

1–4. Teenage Mutant Ninja Turtles #1–4

5. A Lot to Learn (30th Anniversary Special)
6. Teenage Mutant Ninja Turtles #5
7. Micro Series – Raphael
8. Micro Series – Michelangelo
9. Teenage Mutant Ninja Turtles #6
10. Micro Series – Donatello
11–12. Infestation 2: Teenage Mutant Ninja Turtles #1–2
13–14. Teenage Mutant Ninja Turtles #7–8
15. Micro Series – Leonardo
16–17. Teenage Mutant Ninja Turtles #9–10
18. Micro Series – Splinter
19–20. Teenage Mutant Ninja Turtles #11–12
21. Micro Series – Casey Jones
22–23. Teenage Mutant Ninja Turtles #13–14
24. Annual 2012
25. Micro Series – April
26–27. Teenage Mutant Ninja Turtles #15–16
28. Micro Series – Fugitoid
29–32. Teenage Mutant Ninja Turtles #17–20
33. Villains Micro Series – Krang
34. Villains Micro Series – Baxter Stockman
35–38. Secret History of the Foot Clan #1–4
39–40. Teenage Mutant Ninja Turtles #21–22
41. Villains Micro Series – Old Hob
42–43. Teenage Mutant Ninja Turtles #23–24
44. Villains Micro Series – Alopex
45. Villains Micro Series – Karai
46. Teenage Mutant Ninja Turtles #25
47. Villains Micro Series – Hun
48. Teenage Mutant Ninja Turtles #26
49. Villains Micro Series – Bebop & Rocksteady
50–51. Teenage Mutant Ninja Turtles #27–28
52. Villains Micro Series – The Shredder
53. Teenage Mutant Ninja Turtles #29
54. Utrom Empire #1
55. Teenage Mutant Ninja Turtles #30
56. Utrom Empire #2
57–58. Teenage Mutant Ninja Turtles #31–32
59. Utrom Empire #3
60. Annual 2014
61–65. Teenage Mutant Ninja Turtles #33–37
66–69. Turtles in Time #1–4
70–72. Teenage Mutant Ninja Turtles #38–40
73–76. TMNT/Ghostbusters #1–4
77–80. Teenage Mutant Ninja Turtles #41–44
81–84. Mutanimals #1–4
85–86. Teenage Mutant Ninja Turtles #45–46
87. FCBD 2015 – Prelude to Vengeance
88–91. Teenage Mutant Ninja Turtles #47–50
92–95. Casey & April #1–4
96–109. Teenage Mutant Ninja Turtles #51–64
110–114. Bebop & Rocksteady Destroy Everything #1–5
115–118. TMNT Universe #1–4
119. Teenage Mutant Ninja Turtles #65
120–121. TMNT Universe #5–6
122. Teenage Mutant Ninja Turtles #66
123–124. TMNT Universe #7–8
125–128. Teenage Mutant Ninja Turtles #67–70
129–130. TMNT Universe #9–10
131–132. Teenage Mutant Ninja Turtles #71–72
133. Teenage Mutant Ninja Turtles/Usagi Yojimbo
134–138. TMNT Universe #11–15
139–140. TMNT Universe #19–20
141. FCBD 2017 – Prelude to Dimension X
142. Teenage Mutant Ninja Turtles #73
143–147. Dimension X #1–5
148–149. Teenage Mutant Ninja Turtles #74–75
150–154. Teenage Mutant Ninja Turtles/Ghostbusters II #1–5
155–156. TMNT Universe #16–17
157–158. Teenage Mutant Ninja Turtles #76–77
159. TMNT Universe #18
160–162. Teenage Mutant Ninja Turtles #78–80
163–164. TMNT Universe #21–22
165–168. Teenage Mutant Ninja Turtles #81–84
169. Macro Series – Donatello
170. Macro Series – Michelangelo
171–172. TMNT Universe #23–24
173. Teenage Mutant Ninja Turtles #85
174. TMNT Universe #25
175–177. Teenage Mutant Ninja Turtles #86–88
178–182. Bebop & Rocksteady Hit the Road #1–5
183. Macro Series – Leonardo
184. Teenage Mutant Ninja Turtles #89
185. Macro Series – Raphael
186–189. Teenage Mutant Ninja Turtles #90–93
190. FCBD 2019 – "Casualty of War"
191–196. Teenage Mutant Ninja Turtles #94–99
197–201. Shredder in Hell #1–5
202–203. Teenage Mutant Ninja Turtles #100–101
204. Annual 2020
205–208. Teenage Mutant Ninja Turtles #102–105
209–211. Jennika #1–3
212–218. Teenage Mutant Ninja Turtles #106–112
219–221. Jennika II #1–3
222–226. Teenage Mutant Ninja Turtles #113–117
227–229. Jennika II #4–6
230–236. Teenage Mutant Ninja Turtles #118–124
237. Annual 2021
238–243. Teenage Mutant Ninja Turtles #125–130
244–245. Armageddon Game Opening Moves #1–2
246. Annual 2022
247. Teenage Mutant Ninja Turtles #131
248. Teen Spirit (40th Anniversary Comics Celebration)
249. Teenage Mutant Ninja Turtles #132
250. FCBD 2022
251. The Armageddon Game #1
252. Teenage Mutant Ninja Turtles #133
253. The Armageddon Game #2
254. The Armageddon Game – The Alliance #1
255. Teenage Mutant Ninja Turtles #134
256. The Armageddon Game #3
257. Teenage Mutant Ninja Turtles #135
258. The Armageddon Game – The Alliance #2
259. The Armageddon Game – The Alliance #3
260. The Armageddon Game #4
261. Teenage Mutant Ninja Turtles #136
262. The Armageddon Game – The Alliance #4
263. The Armageddon Game #5
264. Teenage Mutant Ninja Turtles #137
265. The Armageddon Game – The Alliance #5
266. The Armageddon Game #6
267. Teenage Mutant Ninja Turtles #138
268. The Armageddon Game – The Alliance #6
269. The Armageddon Game #7
270. Teenage Mutant Ninja Turtles #139
271. The Armageddon Game #8
272. Annual 2023
273–283. Teenage Mutant Ninja Turtles #140–150
284–288. The Untold Destiny of the Foot Clan #1–5
289. Mutant Nation #5
290–293. Mutant Nation #1–4
294. Mutant Nation #6
295. Teenage Mutant Ninja Turtles Alpha
296. FCBD 2024
297–299. Nightwatcher #1–3
300–303. Teenage Mutant Ninja Turtles Vol 2 #1–4
304–307. Nightwatcher #4–7
308–310. Teenage Mutant Ninja Turtles Vol 2 #5–7
311. Mutant Nation #9
312. Teenage Mutant Ninja Turtles Vol 2 #8
313–314. Mutant Nation #7-8
315–318. Teenage Mutant Ninja Turtles Vol 2 #9–12
319. Annual 2025
320–325. Shredder #1–6
326–331. Casey Jones #1–6
332–336. Battle Nexus #1–5
337–342. Teenage Mutant Ninja Turtles Vol 2 #13–18
343–344. Shredder #7–8
345. Teenage Mutant Ninja Turtles Vol 2 #19
346–347. Shredder #9–10
348–349. Teenage Mutant Ninja Turtles Vol 2 #20–21
350. Shredder #11
351. Teenage Mutant Ninja Turtles Vol 2 #22
352. Shredder #12
353. Teenage Mutant Ninja Turtles: The Hunger
354. Teenage Mutant Ninja Turtles Vol 2 #23
355. Shredder #13
356. Teenage Mutant Ninja Turtles Vol 2 #24
357. Shredder #14
358. Holiday Special

359–360. Teenage Mutant Ninja Turtles Vol 2 #25–26

== Collected editions ==
The IDW series has been compiled into collections which include the spinoff series placed into their continuity order. Initially they were released exclusively in deluxe hardcover format. Releases in paperback format began in February 2022.

Title	Release date	Cover	ISBN	Collected material
Teenage Mutant Ninja Turtles: The IDW Collection Volume 1	June 9, 2015	HC	978-1-63140-111-4	Teenage Mutant Ninja Turtles #1–12, A Lot to Learn (TMNT 30th Anniversary Special), Micro-Series: Raphael, Michelangelo, Donatello, Leonardo and Splinter
Teenage Mutant Ninja Turtles: The IDW Collection Volume 1	February 1, 2022	SC	978-1-68405-866-2	Teenage Mutant Ninja Turtles #1–12, A Lot to Learn (TMNT 30th Anniversary Special), Micro-Series: Raphael, Michelangelo, Donatello, Leonardo and Splinter
Teenage Mutant Ninja Turtles: The IDW Collection Volume 2	March 29, 2016	HC	978-1-63140-539-6	Teenage Mutant Ninja Turtles #13–20, Micro-Series: Casey Jones, April and Fugitoid, Villains Micro-Series: Krang and Baxter Stockman, The Secret History of the Foot Clan #1–4
Teenage Mutant Ninja Turtles: The IDW Collection Volume 2	November 15, 2022	SC	978-1-68405-912-6	Teenage Mutant Ninja Turtles #13–20, Micro-Series: Casey Jones, April and Fugitoid, Villains Micro-Series: Krang and Baxter Stockman, The Secret History of the Foot Clan #1–4
Teenage Mutant Ninja Turtles: The IDW Collection Volume 3	September 6, 2016	HC	978-1-63140-691-1	Teenage Mutant Ninja Turtles #21–28, Villains Micro-Series: Old Hob, Alopex, Karai, Hun, Bebop and Rocksteady and Shredder, 2012 Annual
Teenage Mutant Ninja Turtles: The IDW Collection Volume 3	October 31, 2023	SC	979-8-88724-052-7	Teenage Mutant Ninja Turtles #21–28, Villains Micro-Series: Old Hob, Alopex, Karai, Hun, Bebop and Rocksteady and Shredder, 2012 Annual
Teenage Mutant Ninja Turtles: The IDW Collection Volume 4	January 17, 2017	HC	978-1-63140-820-5	Teenage Mutant Ninja Turtles #29–37, Utrom Empire #1–3, 2014 Annual
Teenage Mutant Ninja Turtles: The IDW Collection Volume 4	August 13, 2024	SC	979-8-88724-128-9	Teenage Mutant Ninja Turtles #29–37, Utrom Empire #1–3, 2014 Annual
Teenage Mutant Ninja Turtles: The IDW Collection Volume 5	September 5, 2017	HC	978-1-68405-090-1	Teenage Mutant Ninja Turtles #38–44, Turtles in Time #1–4, TMNT/Ghostbusters #1–4
Teenage Mutant Ninja Turtles: The IDW Collection Volume 5	November 5, 2024	SC	979-8-88724-193-7	Teenage Mutant Ninja Turtles #38–44, Turtles in Time #1–4, TMNT/Ghostbusters #1–4
Teenage Mutant Ninja Turtles: The IDW Collection Volume 6	February 27, 2018	HC	978-1-68405-130-4	Teenage Mutant Ninja Turtles #45–50, 2015 FCBD issue, Mutanimals #1–4, Casey & April #1–4
Teenage Mutant Ninja Turtles: The IDW Collection Volume 6	March 4, 2025	SC	979-8-88724-272-9	Teenage Mutant Ninja Turtles #45–50, 2015 FCBD issue, Mutanimals #1–4, Casey & April #1–4
Teenage Mutant Ninja Turtles: The IDW Collection Volume 7	July 31, 2018	HC	978-1-68405-282-0	Teenage Mutant Ninja Turtles #51–64
Teenage Mutant Ninja Turtles: The IDW Collection Volume 7	August 26, 2025	SC	979-8-88724-313-9	Teenage Mutant Ninja Turtles #51–64
Teenage Mutant Ninja Turtles: The IDW Collection Volume 8	December 4, 2018	HC	978-1-68405-370-4	Bebop & Rocksteady Destroy Everything #1–5, Teenage Mutant Ninja Turtles Universe #1–8, Teenage Mutant Ninja Turtles #65–66
Teenage Mutant Ninja Turtles: The IDW Collection Volume 8	November 4, 2025	SC	979-8-88724-314-6	Bebop & Rocksteady Destroy Everything #1–5, Teenage Mutant Ninja Turtles Universe #1–8, Teenage Mutant Ninja Turtles #65–66
Teenage Mutant Ninja Turtles: The IDW Collection Volume 9	July 19, 2019	HC	978-1-68405-501-2	Teenage Mutant Ninja Turtles #67–72, Teenage Mutant Ninja Turtles Universe #9–15, Teenage Mutant Ninja Turtles/Usagi Yojimbo
Teenage Mutant Ninja Turtles: The IDW Collection Volume 10	January 28, 2020	HC	978-1-68405-590-6	Teenage Mutant Ninja Turtles #73–75, Teenage Mutant Ninja Turtles Universe #19–20, 2017 FCBD issue, Teenage Mutant Ninja Turtles: Dimension X #1–5, TMNT/Ghostbusters II #1–5
Teenage Mutant Ninja Turtles: The IDW Collection Volume 11	October 13, 2020	HC	978-1-68405-682-8	Teenage Mutant Ninja Turtles #76-84, Teenage Mutant Ninja Turtles Universe #16–19 & 21–22, Teenage Mutant Ninja Turtles Macro-Series Donatello
Teenage Mutant Ninja Turtles: The IDW Collection Volume 12	February 9, 2021	HC	978-1-68405-745-0	Teenage Mutant Ninja Turtles #85-89, Teenage Mutant Ninja Turtles Universe #23-25, Teenage Mutant Ninja Turtles Macro-Series Leonardo and Michelangelo, Bebop and Rocksteady: Hit the Road #1-5
Teenage Mutant Ninja Turtles: The IDW Collection Volume 13	July 20, 2021	HC	978-1-68405-807-5	Teenage Mutant Ninja Turtles #90-100, 2019 Free Comic Book Day issue, Teenage Mutant Ninja Turtles Macro-Series Raphael, Shredder in Hell #1-5
Teenage Mutant Ninja Turtles: The IDW Collection Volume 14	July 12, 2022	HC	978-1-68405-860-0	Teenage Mutant Ninja Turtles #101-112, 2020 Annual, Teenage Mutant Ninja Turtles: Jennika #1–3
Teenage Mutant Ninja Turtles: The IDW Collection Volume 15	July 18, 2023	HC	978-1-68405-991-1	Teenage Mutant Ninja Turtles #113-124, Teenage Mutant Ninja Turtles: Jennika II #1–6
Teenage Mutant Ninja Turtles: The IDW Collection Volume 16	July 30, 2024	HC	979-8-88724-127-2	Teenage Mutant Ninja Turtles #125-132, 2021 Annual, 2022 Annual, FCBD 2022, and The Armageddon Game: Opening Moves #1–2
Teenage Mutant Ninja Turtles: The Armageddon Game Deluxe Edition	December 3, 2024	HC	979-8-88724-160-9	2021 Annual, The Armageddon Game: Opening Moves #1–2, Teenage Mutant Ninja Turtles #131–139, The Armageddon Game: The Alliance #1–6, and The Armageddon Game #1–8
Teenage Mutant Ninja Turtles: The IDW Collection Volume 17	April 1, 2025	HC	979-8-88724-273-6	Teen Spirit (material from TMNT 40th Anniversary Comics Celebration), Teenage Mutant Ninja Turtles #133-137, The Armageddon Game: The Alliance #1-5, The Armageddon Game #1-6, and Teen Spirit (40th Anniversary Comics Celebration)
Teenage Mutant Ninja Turtles: The IDW Collection Volume 18	September 2, 2025	HC	979-8-88724-315-3	Teenage Mutant Ninja Turtles #138-150, The Armageddon Game: The Alliance #6, The Armageddon Game #7-8, 2023 Annual, and The Untold Destiny of the Foot Clan miniseries

The various series have been collected in the following trade paperbacks:

Title	Release date	Collected material
Volume 1
Teenage Mutant Ninja Turtles Vol.1: Change is Constant	February 21, 2012	Teenage Mutant Ninja Turtles #1–4
Teenage Mutant Ninja Turtles: Micro-Series Vol. 1	June 26, 2012	Teenage Mutant Ninja Turtles: Micro-Series #1–4
Teenage Mutant Ninja Turtles Vol. 2: Enemies Old, Enemies New	July 24, 2012	Teenage Mutant Ninja Turtles #5–8
Infestation 2 Vol. 3	August 28, 2012	Infestation 2: Teenage Mutant Ninja Turtles #1–2
Teenage Mutant Ninja Turtles Vol. 3: Shadows of the Past	October 9, 2012	Teenage Mutant Ninja Turtles #9–12
Teenage Mutant Ninja Turtles: Micro-Series Vol. 2	November 20, 2012	Teenage Mutant Ninja Turtles: Micro-Series #5–8
Teenage Mutant Ninja Turtles Vol. 4: Sins of the Fathers	February 19, 2013	Teenage Mutant Ninja Turtles #13–16
Teenage Mutant Ninja Turtles Vol. 5: Krang War	May 14, 2013	Teenage Mutant Ninja Turtles #17–20
Teenage Mutant Ninja Turtles: Secret History of the Foot Clan	June 12, 2013	Teenage Mutant Ninja Turtles: Secret History of the Foot Clan #1–4
Teenage Mutant Ninja Turtles Vol. 6: City Fall Part 1	October 29, 2013	Teenage Mutant Ninja Turtles #21–24
Teenage Mutant Ninja Turtles: Villain Micro-Series Vol. 1	November 26, 2013	Teenage Mutant Ninja Turtles: Villain Micro-Series #1–4
Teenage Mutant Ninja Turtles Vol. 7: City Fall Part 2	February 18, 2014	Teenage Mutant Ninja Turtles #25–28
Teenage Mutant Ninja Turtles: Villain Micro-Series Vol. 2	March 25, 2014	Teenage Mutant Ninja Turtles: Villain Micro-Series #5–8
Teenage Mutant Ninja Turtles Vol. 8: Northampton	June 11, 2014	Teenage Mutant Ninja Turtles #29–32
Teenage Mutant Ninja Turtles: Utrom Empire	July 29, 2014	Teenage Mutant Ninja Turtles: Utrom Empire #1–3
Teenage Mutant Ninja Turtles Vol. 9: Monsters, Misfits, and Madmen	October 21, 2014	Teenage Mutant Ninja Turtles #33–36
Teenage Mutant Ninja Turtles: Turtles in Time	December 17, 2014	Teenage Mutant Ninja Turtles: Turtles in Time #1–4
Teenage Mutant Ninja Turtles Vol. 10: New Mutant Order	February 10, 2015	Teenage Mutant Ninja Turtles #37–40
Teenage Mutant Ninja Turtles / Ghostbusters	May 5, 2015	Teenage Mutant Ninja Turtles / Ghostbusters #1–4
Teenage Mutant Ninja Turtles Vol. 11: Attack On Technodrome	June 30, 2015	Teenage Mutant Ninja Turtles #41–44
Teenage Mutant Ninja Turtles: Mutanimals	September 1, 2015	Teenage Mutant Ninja Turtles: Mutanimals #1–4
Teenage Mutant Ninja Turtles Vol. 12: Vengeance Part 1	October 22, 2015	Teenage Mutant Ninja Turtles #45–47 and the 2015 FCBD issue
Teenage Mutant Ninja Turtles: Casey & April	December 31, 2015	Teenage Mutant Ninja Turtles: Casey & April #1–4
Teenage Mutant Ninja Turtles Vol. 13: Vengeance Part 2	January 19, 2016	Teenage Mutant Ninja Turtles #48–50
Teenage Mutant Ninja Turtles Vol. 14: Order from Chaos	May 17, 2016	Teenage Mutant Ninja Turtles #51–55
Batman/TMNT	August 23, 2016	Batman/TMNT #1–6
TMNT: Bebop & Rocksteady Destroy Everything	October 4, 2016	Bebop & Rocksteady Destroy Everything #1–5
Teenage Mutant Ninja Turtles Vol. 15: Leatherhead	October 18, 2016	Teenage Mutant Ninja Turtles #56–60
Teenage Mutant Ninja Turtles Vol. 16: Chasing Phantoms	April 11, 2017	Teenage Mutant Ninja Turtles #61–65
Teenage Mutant Ninja Turtles Universe Vol. 1	April 18, 2017	Teenage Mutant Ninja Turtles Universe #1–5
Teenage Mutant Ninja Turtles Vol. 17: Desperate Measures	September 12, 2017	Teenage Mutant Ninja Turtles #66–70
Teenage Mutant Ninja Turtles Universe Vol. 2: The New Strangeness	October 10, 2017	Teenage Mutant Ninja Turtles Universe #6–10
Teenage Mutant Ninja Turtles: Dimension X	January 30, 2018	Teenage Mutant Ninja Turtles: Dimension X #1–5
Teenage Mutant Ninja Turtles Vol. 18: Trial of Krang	February 20, 2018	Teenage Mutant Ninja Turtles #71–75 and the 2017 FCBD issue
Teenage Mutant Ninja Turtles / Ghostbusters Vol. 02	February 28, 2018	Teenage Mutant Ninja Turtles / Ghostbusters II #1–5
Teenage Mutant Ninja Turtles Universe Vol. 3: Karai's Path	March 13, 2018	Teenage Mutant Ninja Turtles Universe #11–15
Teenage Mutant Ninja Turtles Vol. 19: Invasion of the Triceratons	July 3, 2018	Teenage Mutant Ninja Turtles #76–80
Teenage Mutant Ninja Turtles Universe Vol. 4: Home	August 14, 2018	Teenage Mutant Ninja Turtles Universe #16–20
Teenage Mutant Ninja Turtles Vol. 20: Kingdom of Rats	October 9, 2018	Teenage Mutant Ninja Turtles #81–85
Teenage Mutant Ninja Turtles Universe Vol. 5: The Coming Doom	November 6, 2018	Teenage Mutant Ninja Turtles Universe #21–25
TMNT: Bebop & Rocksteady Hit the Road	February 9, 2019	Bebop & Rocksteady Hit the Road #1-5
Teenage Mutant Ninja Turtles Vol. 21: Battle Lines	May 1, 2019	Teenage Mutant Ninja Turtles #86–89
Teenage Mutant Ninja Turtles: Macro Series	June 18, 2019	Teenage Mutant Ninja Turtles: Macro Series #1–4
Teenage Mutant Ninja Turtles Vol. 22: City at War Part 1	October 9, 2019	Teenage Mutant Ninja Turtles #90–95
Teenage Mutant Ninja Turtles: Shredder in Hell	March 10, 2020	Teenage Mutant Ninja Turtles: Shredder in Hell #1-5
Teenage Mutant Ninja Turtles Vol. 23: City at War Part 2	March 17, 2020	Teenage Mutant Ninja Turtles #96–100
Teenage Mutant Ninja Turtles Reborn Vol. 1: From the Ashes	September 2, 2020	Teenage Mutant Ninja Turtles #101–105
Teenage Mutant Ninja Turtles: Jennika	November 24, 2020	Teenage Mutant Ninja Turtles: Jennika #1–3
Teenage Mutant Ninja Turtles Reborn, Vol. 2 - Life After Death	April 27, 2021	Teenage Mutant Ninja Turtles #106–111
Teenage Mutant Ninja Turtles: Jennika II	August 17, 2021	Teenage Mutant Ninja Turtles: Jennika II #1–6
Teenage Mutant Ninja Turtles Reborn, Vol. 3 - Time After Time	December 1, 2021	Teenage Mutant Ninja Turtles #112–117
Teenage Mutant Ninja Turtles Reborn, Vol. 4 - Sow Wind, Reap Storm	May 25, 2022	Teenage Mutant Ninja Turtles #118-123
Teenage Mutant Ninja Turtles: The Last Ronin	July 5, 2022	Teenage Mutant Ninja Turtles: The Last Ronin #1-5
Teenage Mutant Ninja Turtles Reborn, Vol 5 - Mystic Sister	October 25, 2022	Teenage Mutant Ninja Turtles #124-130
Teenage Mutant Ninja Turtles: The Armageddon Game—Opening Moves	February 7, 2023	"Kingdom of Rats Prelude", Teenage Mutant Ninja Turtles #84, 2020-2021 Annuals, The Armageddon Game—Opening Moves #1–2
Teenage Mutant Ninja Turtles Reborn, Vol 6 - Game Changers	February 28, 2023	2022 Annual, Teenage Mutant Ninja Turtles #131-132, 2022 FCBD issue
Teenage Mutant Ninja Turtles: The Armageddon Game—The Alliance	September 19, 2023	Teenage Mutant Ninja Turtles The Armageddon Game: The Alliance #1-6
Teenage Mutant Ninja Turtles Reborn, Vol 7 - Isolation	September 26, 2023	Teenage Mutant Ninja Turtles #133-139
Teenage Mutant Ninja Turtles: The Last Ronin - Lost Years	November 7, 2023	Teenage Mutant Ninja Turtles: The Last Ronin - Lost Years #1-5
Teenage Mutant Ninja Turtles: The Armageddon Game	November 14, 2023	Teenage Mutant Ninja Turtles: The Armageddon Game #1-8
Teenage Mutant Ninja Turtles Reborn, Vol 8 - Damage Done	February 20, 2024	Teenage Mutant Ninja Turtles #140-144 and 2023 Annual
Teenage Mutant Ninja Turtles Reborn, Vol 9 - First, Last, Always	October 1, 2024	Teenage Mutant Ninja Turtles #145-150
Teenage Mutant Ninja Turtles: 40th Anniversary Comics Celebration―The Deluxe Edition	November 5, 2024	Teenage Mutant Ninja Turtles 40th Anniversary Comics Celebration
Teenage Mutant Ninja Turtles: The Untold Destiny of the Foot Clan	January 9, 2025	Teenage Mutant Ninja Turtles: The Untold Destiny of the Foot Clan #1-5
Volume 2
Teenage Mutant Ninja Turtles, Vol One: Return To New York	June 24 2025	Teenage Mutant Ninja Turtles #1-6 and Long Way From Home (Teenage Mutant Ninja Turtles: Alpha)
Teenage Mutant Ninja Turtles: Mutant Nation	July 29, 2025	Teenage Mutant Ninja Turtles: Mutant Nation #1-5 and Monster Island (Teenage Mutant Ninja Turtles: Alpha)
Teenage Mutant Ninja Turtles: Nightwatcher	August 26, 2025	Teenage Mutant Ninja Turtles: Nightwatcher #1-7 and Free Comic Book Day 2024
Teenage Mutant Ninja Turtles, Vol Two: NYC vs TMNT	March 10, 2026	Teenage Mutant Ninja Turtles #7-12
Teenage Mutant Ninja Turtles, Vol Three: Ujigami	November 24, 2026	Teenage Mutant Ninja Turtles #13-18

== Other TMNT publications by IDW ==
=== Mirage Comics ===
The original Mirage Comics series has been collected in various formats since its release:

==== The Ultimate Collection/The Works ====
The Ultimate Collection series collects the issues from volume 1 worked on by its original creators Kevin Eastman and Peter Laird. The material in Volumes 1-5 was later recollected in full color as Teenage Mutant Ninja Turtles: The Works.

Title	Release date	Collected material
Teenage Mutant Ninja Turtles: The Ultimate Collection Vol. 1	January 10, 2012 (HC) June 4, 2013 (The Works) November 7, 2017 (SC)	TMNT #1-7, Micro-Series Raphael
Teenage Mutant Ninja Turtles: The Ultimate Collection Vol. 2	April 24, 2012 (HC) October 29, 2013 (The Works) June 5, 2018 (SC)	TMNT #8-11, Micro-Series Michaelangelo, Leonardo, and Donatello
Teenage Mutant Ninja Turtles: The Ultimate Collection Vol. 3	August 14, 2012 (HC) September 9, 2014 (The Works) October 2, 2018 (SC)	TMNT #12, 14-15, 17, 19-21
Teenage Mutant Ninja Turtles: The Ultimate Collection Vol. 4	April 23, 2013 (HC) December 22, 2015 (The Works) December 10, 2019 (SC)	TMNT #48-55
Teenage Mutant Ninja Turtles: The Ultimate Collection Vol. 5	December 24, 2013 (HC) August 16, 2016 (The Works) February 2, 2021 (SC)	TMNT #56-62
Teenage Mutant Ninja Turtles: The Ultimate Collection Vol. 6	January 5, 2016 (HC) March 1, 2022 (SC)	Various short stories and one-shots published between 1985 and 1989
Teenage Mutant Ninja Turtles: The Ultimate Collection Vol. 7	February 28, 2023 (HC)	Covers and developmental art

==== Teenage Mutant Ninja Turtles Classics/Legends ====
A series collecting colorized issues of the Mirage series done by other creators, as well as the Vol. 2 series.

Title	Release date	Collected material
Teenage Mutant Ninja Turtles Classics Vol. 1	August 28, 2012	TMNT #13, plus stories from the Shell Shock collection: Bottoming Out; Junk Man; New York Ninja; Word Warriors; 49th Street Stompers; O-Deed; The Road Trip; Don't Judge a Book...; A Splinter in the Eye of God?; Night Life; Meanwhile... 1,000,000 BC.
Teenage Mutant Ninja Turtles Classics Vol. 2	August 29, 2012	TMNT #16, 22-23
Teenage Mutant Ninja Turtles Classics Vol. 3	December 19, 2012	TMNT #27-29
Teenage Mutant Ninja Turtles Classics Vol. 4	April 3, 2013	TMNT #32-33, 37, plus the short story "The Ring"
Teenage Mutant Ninja Turtles Legends: Soul's Winter	December 2, 2014	TMNT #31, 35-36
Teenage Mutant Ninja Turtles Classics Vol. 5	June 5, 2013	TMNT #34, 38-40
Teenage Mutant Ninja Turtles Classics Vol. 6	January 29, 2014	TMNT #42-44
Teenage Mutant Ninja Turtles Classics Vol. 7	October 24, 2013	TMNT #45-47
Teenage Mutant Ninja Turtles Classics Vol. 8	May 14, 2014	TMNT Vol. 2 #1-5
Teenage Mutant Ninja Turtles Classics Vol. 9	February 11, 2015	TMNT Vol. 2 #6-9
Teenage Mutant Ninja Turtles Classics Vol. 10	June 3, 2015	TMNT Vol. 2 #10-13

==== Compendiums ====
Title	Release date	Collected material
Teenage Mutant Ninja Turtles Compendium, Vol. 1	October 18, 2022	TMNT #1-7, 9-14, Micro-Series Raphael, Michelangelo, Donatello, Leonardo, Fugitoid #1, Tales of the TMNT #1-5
Teenage Mutant Ninja Turtles Compendium, Vol. 2	October 3, 2023	TMNT #15-23, 27-29, 31-37, Tales of the TMNT #6-7, and the short story "The Ring"
Teenage Mutant Ninja Turtles Compendium, Vol. 3	September 3, 2024	TMNT #38-62
Teenage Mutant Ninja Turtles: The Mirage Years (1993–1995)	February 18, 2025	TMNT Vol. 2 #1-13

Collections of the original Mirage comics series:

- Tales of the Teenage Mutant Ninja Turtles Vol. 1, Tales of the TMNT Volume I #1–4 + Extras (December 2012)
- Tales of the Teenage Mutant Ninja Turtles Vol. 2, Tales of the TMNT Volume I #5–7 (April 2013)
- Tales of the Teenage Mutant Ninja Turtles Vol. 3, Tales of the TMNT Volume II #1–4 (October 2013)
- Tales of the Teenage Mutant Ninja Turtles Vol. 4, Tales of the TMNT Volume II #5–8 (May 2014)
- Tales of the Teenage Mutant Ninja Turtles Vol. 5, Tales of the TMNT Volume II #9–12 (August 2014)
- Tales of the Teenage Mutant Ninja Turtles Vol. 6, Tales of the TMNT Volume II #13–16 (November 2014)
- Tales of the Teenage Mutant Ninja Turtles Vol. 7, Tales of the TMNT Volume II #17–20 (August 2015)
- Tales of the Teenage Mutant Ninja Turtles Vol. 8, Tales of the TMNT Volume II #21-25 (April 2016)
- Teenage Mutant Ninja Turtles Legends: Soul's Winter, collecting colorized versions of Mirage Studios' Vol. 1 issues #31, 35, 36 (December 2014)

Collections of the Teenage Mutant Ninja Turtles Adventures originally published by Archie Comics:

- Teenage Mutant Ninja Turtles Adventures Compendium, Vol. 1, collecting the original three-issue mini-series, Teenage Mutant Ninja Turtles Adventures issues #1–17, plus the short stories “Zen Million Year to Birth,” “The Night of Monsterex,” “Metamorphosis,” “A Forgotten TMNT Adventure,” “Yo-Ho-Ho! And a Bottle of Mutagen!,” and “Doomsday Hassle in Banshee Castle” (March 2025)
- Teenage Mutant Ninja Turtles Adventures Vol. 1 (August 2012)
- Teenage Mutant Ninja Turtles Adventures Vol. 2 (October 2012)
- Teenage Mutant Ninja Turtles Adventures Vol. 3 (January 2013)
- Teenage Mutant Ninja Turtles Adventures Vol. 4 (March 2013)
- Teenage Mutant Ninja Turtles Adventures Vol. 5 (July 2013)
- Teenage Mutant Ninja Turtles Adventures Vol. 6 (December 2013)
- Teenage Mutant Ninja Turtles Adventures Vol. 7 (May 2014)
- Teenage Mutant Ninja Turtles Adventures Vol. 8 (September 2014)
- Teenage Mutant Ninja Turtles Adventures Vol. 9 (January 2015)
- Teenage Mutant Ninja Turtles Adventures Vol. 10 (October 2015)
- Teenage Mutant Ninja Turtles Adventures Vol. 11 (March 2016)
- Teenage Mutant Ninja Turtles Adventures Vol. 12 (September 2016)
- Teenage Mutant Ninja Turtles Adventures Vol. 13 (May 2017)
- Teenage Mutant Ninja Turtles Adventures Vol. 14 (November 2017)
- Teenage Mutant Ninja Turtles Adventures Vol. 15 (July 2018)
- Teenage Mutant Ninja Turtles Adventures Vol. 16 (December 2018)

=== Comics ===
- Teenage Mutant Ninja Turtles: 100-Page Spectacular (April 2012) – Collects the 3-issue miniseries that preceded Archie Comics' Teenage Mutant Ninja Turtles Adventures series.
- Teenage Mutant Ninja Turtles Color Classics (begun May 2012) – This series reprints issues 1–11 of TMNT Vol. 1 by Eastman and Laird (excepting issue #8 due to guest character copyright) and the four Micro-Series issues in full color with coloring by Tom Smith.
- Teenage Mutant Ninja Turtles Urban Legends (begun May 2018) – Reprints issues 1-23 of the TMNT Volume 3 originally published by Image Comics in full color. IDW commissioned original Volume 3 writer Gary Carlson and artist Frank Fosco to produce issues 24–26 to conclude the series. Later collected in two tradepaperback volumes.
- Teenage Mutant Ninja Turtles Journeys (begun August 2025) – Reprints issues 1-32 of TMNT Vol. 4 by Laird and Jim Lawson.
