= Dan Duncan (animation director) =

Comics artist and animation director

- Education: The Kubert School
- Occupations: Comics artist; Storyboard artist; Animation director; Television producer
- Known for: Teenage Mutant Ninja Turtles; Invincible

Dan Duncan is a comics artist, storyboard artist, animation director and television producer. He drew the first twelve issues of IDW Publishing's 2011 relaunch of Teenage Mutant Ninja Turtles before working in television animation. He later directed episodes of Hulk and the Agents of S.M.A.S.H. and Marvel's Spider-Man and served as supervising director and producer on Invincible. In June 2026, his appointment as an executive producer of Invincible was announced.

== Career ==
=== Comics ===
Duncan attended the Kubert School. His early comics work included The Butler for Image Comics and the final issue of Jennifer Love Hewitt's Music Box for IDW. Tom Waltz, who later co-wrote Teenage Mutant Ninja Turtles, said he had seen Duncan's artwork for Music Box and asked him to submit sample pages for the new series.

IDW launched Teenage Mutant Ninja Turtles in August 2011. Working from layouts by franchise co-creator Kevin Eastman, Duncan penciled and inked the first twelve issues. He left the monthly series in July 2012. IDW editor Bobby Curnow said Duncan had accepted a job in television animation.

In 2014, Duncan and Waltz contributed a story representing the early IDW continuity to the franchise's thirtieth-anniversary anthology. Duncan also illustrated the fourth issue of Teenage Mutant Ninja Turtles: Turtles in Time that year. He returned to the main series for issue #150 in 2024 and contributed to a backup story in the franchise's 300th legacy-numbered issue in 2026.

=== Animation ===
Duncan directed episodes of Hulk and the Agents of S.M.A.S.H., including the 2015 episode "Planet Monster, Part 1". For Marvel's Spider-Man, he directed "How I Thwipped My Summer Vacation" (2018), the second-season premiere. His other credits include supervising director on Marvel's Guardians of the Galaxy and the second season of gen:LOCK.

Duncan was supervising director and producer on the second season of Invincible. In a 2024 interview with Animation World Network about the special Invincible: Atom Eve, he discussed the physical consequences of the violence depicted in the series. In June 2026, series co-creator Robert Kirkman announced that Duncan and fellow supervising director Shaun O'Neil would become executive producers for future seasons.

== Critical reception ==
Reviewers commented on Duncan's character designs and use of expression in Teenage Mutant Ninja Turtles. Brian Warmoth of ComicsAlliance compared aspects of his style to Mike Mignola's, while Caleb Goellner, also writing for ComicsAlliance, observed how Duncan differentiated the four Turtles through facial expressions and body language. Greg McElhatton of Read About Comics praised the clarity of the action scenes but found the artwork somewhat lighter in tone than the script.

Reviewing Turtles in Time #4 in 2014, Nick Nafpliotis of AIPT praised Duncan's ability to shift between the issue's humor and darker scenes.

== Selected works ==
Year(s)	Work	Credit
2011–2012; 2024; 2026	Teenage Mutant Ninja Turtles (IDW)	Penciller and inker, issues #1–12; later contributions
2014	Teenage Mutant Ninja Turtles: Turtles in Time	Penciller and inker, issue #4
2015	Hulk and the Agents of S.M.A.S.H.	Episode director
2018	Marvel's Spider-Man	Episode director; "How I Thwipped My Summer Vacation"
2018	Marvel's Guardians of the Galaxy	Supervising director
2021	gen:LOCK	Supervising director, second season
2023–2026	Invincible	Supervising director and producer; named an executive producer in 2026
