= Batman vs. Teenage Mutant Ninja Turtles =

2019 animated crossover superhero film

- Official DVD cover
- Directed by: Jake Castorena
- Written by: Marly Halpern-Graser
- Based on: Characters from DC; Characters from Nickelodeon
- Produced by: Ben Jones
- Starring: Troy Baker; Eric Bauza; Darren Criss; Kyle Mooney; Baron Vaughn
- Edited by: Rob Ehrenreich; Kyle Stafford
- Music by: Kevin Riepl
- Production companies: Warner Bros. Animation; DC Entertainment; Nickelodeon
- Distributed by: Warner Bros. Home Entertainment
- Release dates: March 31, 2019 (WonderCon Anaheim); May 14, 2019 (Digital)
- Running time: 87 minutes
- Country: United States
- Language: English

Batman vs. Teenage Mutant Ninja Turtles is a 2019 American animated superhero film directed by Jake Castorena and written by Marly Halpern-Graser. Inspired by the DC Comics and IDW Publishing comic book miniseries Batman/Teenage Mutant Ninja Turtles by James Tynion IV and Freddie Williams II, the story focuses on Batman, Robin, and Batgirl teaming up with the Teenage Mutant Ninja Turtles in order to save Gotham City from chaos at the hands of both Shredder and Ra's al Ghul. The film features the voices of Troy Baker, Eric Bauza, Darren Criss, Kyle Mooney, and Baron Vaughn.

In February 2019, it was announced that an animated adaptation of the comic book miniseries Batman/Teenage Mutant Ninja Turtles was in development, as a collaboration between Warner Bros. Animation, DC Entertainment, and Nickelodeon. The interdimensional aspect of the original comic story was omitted, in reverence to past superhero crossovers that establish both properties involved as existing in the same reality, with the additional goal of simplifying the story.

Batman vs. Teenage Mutant Ninja Turtles was the first collaboration between Warner Bros. and Nickelodeon (once co-owned by then-parent Warner Communications until 1985) before the acquisition of Warner Bros. Discovery by Paramount Skydance in October 2026, and the first Teenage Mutant Ninja Turtles film to be distributed by Warner Bros. in the United States since TMNT.

The film was produced for the direct-to-video market, and was released on both Blu-ray and Digital HD on June 4, 2019. It received positive reviews and grossed over $3.3 million from home video sales.

This is one of the posthumous releases for longtime DC producer Benjamin Melniker, who died just over a year before its release.

== Plot ==
While touring Powers Industrial, Barbara Gordon witnesses a power generator being stolen by the Foot Clan and also spots four creatures during the robbery that she refers to as metahumans. She reports this back to Batman, who decides that if the culprits want high tech, he will set a trap with it. The Foot Clan then attacks Wayne Enterprises to steal an experimental cloud seeder machine, but are ambushed by Batman, who fends off the Foot and their leader, Shredder. Meanwhile, it is revealed that the four metahumans Batgirl sighted are actually the Teenage Mutant Ninja Turtles, currently tracking Shredder's actions to Gotham City, having learned he has allied with an unknown party. After defending Wayne Enterprises from the Penguin, the Turtles encounter and fight Batman, as each side believes the other is the enemy. Batman is able to overpower the Turtles, who then retreat.

Donatello researches Batman and his sighted locations, and uses this information to figure out the location of the Batcave. After a brief scuffle with Robin, Batman and Batgirl arrive, and the Turtles introduce themselves and explain their reason for coming to Gotham. The two groups agree to work together against their common enemies, and Robin reveals that Shredder and the Foot Clan are working with Ra's al Ghul and the League of Assassins. Shredder and Ra's meet and strike a bargain: Ra's will give Shredder access to the Lazarus Pit to become immortal, in exchange for Shredder building a machine that will spray the Techno Cosmic Research Institute (TCRI) mutagen over Gotham, transforming the citizens into monstrous mutants that will destroy the city. With Shredder's failure to steal the cloud seeder, Ra's hires the Penguin to intercept it, while he and Shredder go to Arkham Asylum and release the Joker. The two trade Joker a vial of the TCRI mutagen for the Joker Venom formula, which combined with the mutagen will drive the mutated insane, and Joker uses the mutagen on Arkham's inmates.

The Bat-Family and the Turtles are alerted about an alarm at Arkham by Commissioner Gordon and investigate. After fighting their way through various mutated members of Batman's rogues gallery, they confront Harley Quinn and Joker, mutated into a spotted hyena and a king cobra. Joker injects Batman with a mixture of Joker venom and mutagen, transforming him into a mutant vampire bat who attacks the others in a frenzy, throwing Two-Face out a window. The heroes are able to inject Batman with an anti-mutagen and restore him, and subdue Harley and Joker. Batgirl learns about the cloud seeder's theft by Penguin, and they realize the incident at Arkham was a distraction. Aware that Shredder and Ra's will be using Joker venom, they deduce they will be at Ace Chemicals to create it.

At Ace Chemicals, the Bat-family and the Turtles fight through the Foot Clan and the League of Assassins with the Batmobile and the Turtle Van. While Batman fights Shredder and Leonardo engages Ra's, Donatello and Michelangelo sabotage the cloud seeder as it launches. Leonardo subdues Ra's, and Batman is able to defeat Shredder with a distraction from Raphael. The cloud seeder crashes into the facility and explodes, knocking Shredder into a vat of Joker venom and destroying Ace Chemicals. At the Batcave, the Turtles prepare to return to New York until Batman reveals a surprise pizza party to celebrate their victory. In a post-credits scene, Shredder emerges from the rubble of Ace Chemicals, now possessing a Joker-like appearance and laughing maniacally.

== Voice cast ==
- Troy Baker as
  - Bruce Wayne / Batman
  - The Joker
- Eric Bauza as Leonardo
- Darren Criss as Raphael
- Baron Vaughn as Donatello
- Kyle Mooney as Michelangelo
- Ben Giroux as Damian Wayne / Robin
- Rachel Bloom as Barbara Gordon / Batgirl
- Brian George as Alfred Pennyworth
- Jim Meskimen as
  - Commissioner James Gordon
  - Dr. Jonathan Crane / Scarecrow
- Tom Kenny as
  - Oswald Cobblepot / Penguin
  - League of Assassins Ninja
- Tara Strong as
  - Harleen Quinzel / Harley Quinn
  - Pamela Isley / Poison Ivy
  - Pizza Delivery Girls
  - Woman
- John DiMaggio as Victor Fries / Mr. Freeze
- Carlos Alazraqui as Bane
- Keith Ferguson as
  - Dr. Baxter Stockman
  - Harvey Dent / Two-Face
- Cas Anvar as Ra's al Ghul
- Andrew Kishino as Shredder

== Production ==
=== Development and writing ===
In February 2019, it was announced that an animated adaptation of the miniseries Batman/Teenage Mutant Ninja Turtles was in development, as a collaboration between Warner Bros. Animation and Nickelodeon. In May 2019, Jake Casterona was announced to be directing from a screenplay by Marly Halpern-Graser, with Ben Jones producing; Jones previously worked on both Batman: The Brave and the Bold (2008–11) and Teenage Mutant Ninja Turtles (2012–17).

Early during production, Jones wanted to omit the interdimensional aspect of the original comics, due to both his love for crossovers such as Superman vs. Spider-Man that established both properties as existing in the same reality, as well as simplifying the story. Due to this, Halpern-Graser sought to instead stay faithful to the comic's tone and structure while incorporating these changes to the story, with multiple lines and panels being adapted verbatim to the film. Regarding the portrayals of Batman and the Turtles, Casterona wanted to contrast them by portraying Batman as more serious and the Turtles being more lighthearted and fun-loving. However, he wanted to avoid portraying them in a goofy light similar to the 1980s series, so he and the crew instead drew inspiration from the 1990 film and how it portrayed the Turtles in a lighthearted manner while still being serious in tone. Producer Ben Jones and screenwriter Mary Halpern-Graser expressed interest in a sequel that centers on Batman interacting with elements from the Turtles franchise, expressing particular interest in featuring characters such as Krang and Bebop and Rocksteady.

=== Casting ===
The initial announcement revealed Troy Baker would reprise his roles as both Batman and the Joker from previous DC properties, making Baker the first actor to portray both characters in the same property. The film features Darren Criss, Eric Bauza, Kyle Mooney and Baron Vaughn as the four Turtles: Raphael, Leonardo, Michelangelo and Donatello. Rachel Bloom voices Batgirl and Cas Anvar voices Ra's al Ghul. In addition, Tom Kenny, John DiMaggio, Carlos Alazraqui and Tara Strong reprise their roles as the Penguin, Mr. Freeze, Bane, Harley Quinn and Poison Ivy from various DC properties. Other key cast members of the film were revealed a month later, which consists of Ben Giroux as Robin, Andrew Kishino as the Shredder, Keith Ferguson as Baxter Stockman and Two-Face, Brian George reprising his role as Alfred Pennyworth from Batman: The Killing Joke, and Jim Meskimen as Commissioner James Gordon and the Scarecrow. Voice recording had begun by the time the film was announced. Both Warner and Nickelodeon were involved in the casting process, while Gene Vassilaros serves as casting director, after working on that role in previous animated Turtles media. According to producer Ben Jones, Nickelodeon executives mandated for none of the cast members from the then-current series Rise of the Teenage Mutant Ninja Turtles to be brought back to reprise their roles.

== Release ==
The first trailer was released on March 12, 2019. The film had its world premiere at WonderCon Anaheim 2019 on March 31. The film was later released to Digital on May 14, and on Ultra HD Blu-ray and Blu-ray on June 4, 2019.

== Reception ==
Batman vs. Teenage Mutant Ninja Turtles was released to positive reviews. Based on 14 reviews collected on Rotten Tomatoes, the film has an approval rating of 100% with an average rating of a 7.5/10.

The film earned around $609,000 from domestic DVD sales and $2.7 million from domestic Blu-ray sales, bringing its total domestic home video earnings to $3.3 million.
