= Batman/Teenage Mutant Ninja Turtles Adventures =

Crossover comic book mini-series

- Cover of Batman/Teenage Mutant Ninja Turtles Adventures #2

Publication information
- Publisher: DC Comics; IDW Publishing
- Schedule: Monthly
- Format: Limited series
- Genre: Superhero
- Publication date: November 2016 – May 2017
- No. of issues: 6
- Main character(s): Batman; Raphael; Michelangelo; Donatello; Leonardo

Creative team
- Written by: Matthew K. Manning
- Artist: Jon Sommariva
- Letterer: Shawn Lee
- Colorist: Leonardo Ito
- Editor: Bobby Curnow

Batman/Teenage Mutant Ninja Turtles Adventures is a six-issue intercompany crossover comic book miniseries featuring fictional heroes Batman and the Teenage Mutant Ninja Turtles. The miniseries is based on a previous intercompany crossover titled Batman/Teenage Mutant Ninja Turtles between DC Comics and IDW Publishing, which was first announced during IDW's panel at the 2015 San Diego Comic-Con and released as a six-part monthly miniseries in late 2015 and early 2016.

== Overview ==
The success of Batman/Teenage Mutant Ninja Turtles prompted the concept for a similar crossover story, with Batman's DC Animated Universe incarnation encountering the Amazing Adventures comic version of the 2012 CGI series' Turtles. Author Matthew K. Manning (Beware the Batman) and artist Jon Sommariva (Teenage Mutant Ninja Turtles: Amazing Adventures) were named as participants in the project. The concept was first introduced at San Diego Comic-Con in late July 2016, and was released in six issues starting November 9, 2016.

== Plot ==
=== Premise ===
When villains start to mysteriously escape Arkham, Batman seeks to track them down. What happens when he discovers that they have left Gotham completely...and entered the TMNT's New York City?

=== Issues #1-5 ===
One day, several inmates of Arkham Asylum have mysteriously gone missing from their cells. Batman tracks down one of the escapees, Two-Face, to his new hideout. When Batman questions him about how he and the others could escape from the facility, Two-Face, who has gone nearly apathetic, murmurs that he has seen a "new world without [himself],... without Batman, without Gotham" and draws the picture of a triangle on a dusty TV screen. Sneaking into Two-Face's cell in Arkham, Batman detects a triangular imprint consisting of a strange, plasmatic substance on the wall and retrieves a sample.

In said other world, after another nighttime patrol in the streets of New York City where Michelangelo has had fun with a thief (thereby quoting Batman's line "I am vengeance, I am the night" from the animated episode "Nothing to Fear"), Donatello is alerted by a scanning program on his computer telling him that the Kraang have activated another dimensional portal in the sewers. The Turtles and April follow the energy reading to its source and discover an active portal, just before they are ambushed by Clayface. When Michelangelo gives him the insulting nickname "Mudbutt", Clayface concentrates his attacks on him, inadvertently moving back in front of the portal in the process. By opening a water outlet pipe, Donatello flushes Clayface back into the portal, which promptly vanishes.

Meanwhile, in the Batcave, Batman tries to trace back the origin of the residue he found in Dent's cell by adjusting his detectors for the energy frequency which generated the substance. When his computer detects another activation of that energy, Batman races off, ordering Alfred to call Robin for reinforcements. In New York City's Chinatown, two Foot-Bots stumble upon a large group of their fellows smashed to pieces by two new arrivals, who wish to see their boss: the Joker and his sidekick Harley Quinn. After meeting with the Joker and Harley in a Lower East Side warehouse and hearing the story of their arrival, the Shredder is not at all impressed by the two newcomers. When the Joker finds that the Shredder is not one to negotiate about surrendering the rule of the entire city to him, he incapacitates his opposite number with a dose of his laughing gas and takes control of the Foot Clan.

In the meantime, in Gotham City, Robin and Batgirl rendezvous with Batman to investigate the newly detected dimensional portal, while the Turtles and April do the very same on their side in New York's Central Park. As Michelangelo, incautious as ever, puts his hand through in order to feel what might be on the other side, he inadvertently ends up groping Batman's face, and the Dark Knight retaliates with a blow to Michelangelo's nose. This provokes a hostile reaction from Raphael when Batman's team steps through the portal, inciting immediate mutual hostilities; but the battle quickly grinds to a halt when a nearby jogger is attacked by Snakeweed. As the two teams prepare to engage the monstrous plant mutant, they encounter Poison Ivy, who has Snakeweed under her mental control. While the rest of the united teams keep Snakeweed busy, Robin and Raphael pursue and capture Ivy, who is subsequently dumped through the Kraang portal back into her native dimension, while Snakeweed faints once Ivy's control over him is gone.

Afterwards, the two teams move to the Turtles' hideout and begin to socialize when Splinter appears with the grave news that a strange, inexplicable mass panic has gripped the populace of the East Village. Just then, Donatello receives a reading about a new portal in Chinatown, which divides their current priorities. Batman therefore suggests to split the teams: While Robin, Batgirl, Donatello, Michelangelo and April secure the Chinatown portal, he, Leonardo and Raphael will deal with the situation in the East Village. When they arrive there and see the people on the streets gripped by fear without a visible cause, Batman immediately deduces that the Scarecrow is responsible and departs alone to look for him. But as soon as he is gone, Leonardo and Raphael are overcome by the Scarecrow's fear gas and captured by the villain. Because his gas mask is cracked, Batman is also affected and captured by the Scarecrow, but he manages to fight off the hallucinations and drives the villain into flight through one of the Kraang portals.

In the meantime, as Robin, Batgirl, Michelangelo, Donatello and April investigate Chinatown, they run into Foot-Bots with ghastly grins painted on their masks, making them realize that the Joker is now in charge of the Foot Clan. While smashing the robots to pieces, Donatello discovers a peculiar small button-like object near the Kraang portal. Then they proceed to the Clan's hideout, where they find Harley implementing the final stages of the Joker's master plan to flood all of New York with his deadly laughing gas. Harley sics Bud and Lou - now humanoid mutants - at the heroes, but they manage to fight their way into the Shredder's throne room. Batman follows with Leonardo and Raphael, who are still struggling with the effects of the Scarecrow's fear compound. When he hears Splinter's name mentioned by them, the Shredder overcomes the Joker's laughing gas and knocks the madman out, allowing the Turtles and Batman to leave unmolested with their captives. Once outside, Donatello shows Batman the button he has found; it is a beacon built with human technology, which can be used for mind control. This fact, and the pictogram of a white rabbit on the beacon's surface, reveal the actual villain behind this cross-dimensional scheme: the Mad Hatter, the last of the Arkham escapees.

In a flashback, it is revealed that the Hatter had by happenstance tapped into the frequency used to open the Kraang portals before he was apprehended by Batman and sent to Arkham. However, by gradually taking control of the guards, the Hatter managed to recreate the technology he used to open the portals, and by furtively fitting his fellow escapees with his beacons, which would fall off them after they had stepped through a portal, he would set up a transmission network which would allow his mind control machines to blanket all of Manhattan. While Robin and Michelangelo (clad in a stitched-up imitation of Batman's costume) travel to Gotham City to apprehend the Mad Hatter from that end, the rest of the Batman/Turtles team work on finding the location in New York where the villain intends to open the last portal and then activate his mind control device, which will set off the beacons. Robin and Michelangelo track down the Hatter, but his mind-controlled minions prevent them from stopping the villain setting off the beacons through a portal above New York's Times Square, enabling him to take control of everyone (including Batman, Batgirl and the other Turtles) in New York.

Michelangelo succeeds in breaking free and, using bungee cords from his improvised costume, catapults himself against the mind control machine, smashing its circuitry, upon which Batman and the Turtles come through the portal and finish the Hatter off. After wrapping things up, the Turtles take their goodbye from Batman and return to their own dimension. Before they begin to round up the other Arkham escapees, Batman, Robin and Batgirl (inspired by the Turtles' example) take the time to relax and get themselves a pizza first. However, the Scarecrow, having returned to his own dimension and expressing fear of an unknown party, decides to redesign his costume to make him scarier in order to protect himself more effectively, thus leading to his new look from The New Batman Adventures.

=== Issue #6 ===
The story of this issue takes place an undefined amount of time later, after Dick Grayson has left the Bat Family to establish himself as Nightwing and Tim Drake has joined the fold as the new Robin. While Bruce Wayne and Tim attend an open-air film presentation featuring Bruce's childhood idol, the Gray Ghost, Gotham City suddenly comes under attack by a horde of hostile aliens: the Kraang. Bruce and Tim don their costumes and unite with Batgirl to fight them, and the three soon find themselves joined once again with the Turtles, who pop in through an interdimensional portal of their own. Leonardo relates a theory by Donatello that the Mad Hatter's hacking into the Kraang's systems enabled the aliens to follow the trail to Gotham, and the Turtles hijacked a portal generator to follow the Kraang in turn.

Facing innumerable odds, an explanatory comment by Michelangelo for Tim's benefit sparks the idea in Leonardo and Batman that their best weapon against this invasion would be the Scarecrow's fear gas. Batman and Raphael head to Arkham, where they find the Scarecrow not totally unprepared for their and the Kraang's appearances; it transpires that, during his retreat back to his home dimension, the Scarecrow has had an involuntary stopover in Dimension X and barely escaped the Kraang's clutches. Suspecting that a full-blown incursion would soon follow, he concocted a specialized version of his fear gas and secretly substituted it with the Gotham Police Department's helium supply for their patrol blimps.

Returning to the battle scene, where the rest of the protagonist team has meanwhile been joined by Nightwing, Batman activates the police blimps' release valves, unleashing the Scarecrow's gas. Although the compound also affects the Turtles because their physiology was altered by the Kraang's mutagen, Raphael leaves the Batwing to rip open a blimp whose valves are malfunctioning and manages to ride out the gas' effects thanks to his prior experience with it. The other Turtles are protected by atmospheric filtration units, but the Kraang, severely affected by the substance, beat an immediate retreat. The Turtles open up a portal back to their reality in order to deal with them and take their goodbyes, although Raphael has a sudden, brief vision of the Shredder appearing within the portal. After the Turtles' departure, Batman and his partners return to attending the Gray Ghost film presentation.

== Collected Editions ==
- Batman/Teenage Mutant Ninja Turtles Adventures (collects Batman/Teenage Mutant Ninja Turtles Adventures #1-6, 144 pages, paperback, July 18, 2017, ISBN 978-1-63140-909-7)
