= He-Man/ThunderCats =

Comic book limited series

- Cover of He-Man/ThunderCats #1 (December 2016). Art by Freddie E. Williams II.

Publication information
- Publisher: DC Comics
- Format: Limited series
- Publication date: December 2016 – May 2017
- No. of issues: 6
- Main character(s): Masters of the Universe; ThunderCats

Creative team
- Written by: Rob David; Lloyd Goldfine
- Artist: Freddie E. Williams II

Collected editions
- He-Man / Thundercats: ISBN 978-1401269159
- He-Man / Thundercats: ISBN 140126915X

He-Man/ThunderCats is a comic book limited series. The series features a storyline that crosses-over the Masters of the Universe and ThunderCats franchises.

== Plot ==
After another defeat at the hands of Lion-O Lord of the Thundercats, Mumm-Ra returns to his Black Pyramid to restore himself. After being healed, Mumm-Ra's masters, The Ancient Spirits of Evil claim to have found a weapon that will defeat the Thundercats once and for all, The Power Sword of He-Man.

On Eternia in Eternos city, Prince Adam awakens with a start and races to a ceremony in his honor only to find the assemble heroes, as well as Adam's father King Randor have been waiting for him over a half hour. King Randor berates his son claiming Adam is clearly not ready for the responsibility of taking on royal duties. Suddenly, an earthquake shakes the city and all look up to see Third Earth, home of the Thundercats and Mumm-Ra tearing through space into orbit above Eternia.

Back on Third Earth, the Thundercats are startled by the earthquakes and the appearance of Eternia in their skies. Their long time mentor, Jaga appears in his ghost form and tells them about Eternia and that he fears that both worlds will live or die together. Lion-O raises the Sword of Omens to grant himself sight beyond sight to see what danger the Thundercats now face.

Back on Eternia, Third Earth's presence has caused massive earthquakes that the heroes of Eternia rush to defend the population against. Finally, a massive tidal wave rises up and swamps the city throwing Adam, Randor, and Adam's talking pet tiger Cringer over a balcony and into the waters. Adam manages to save the unconscious Randor and pulls both of them to higher ground with Cringer. As Adam raises the Sword of Power to become He-Man the Sorceress of Grayskull arrives to stop him, telling him that an evil has come for the sword and she will secure it within Castle Grayskull. When Adam hands the sword over the Sorceress stabs him clear through the chest, revealing herself to be Mumm-Ra in disguise.

After confirming their allies on Third Earth are safe from the quakes the Thundercats prepare to head to Eternia. Lion-O speaks his fears about the mission to Panthro, wondering if he, as the Thundercats ruler, is up to the task ahead. Panthro encourages the young king and says both the Sword of Omens and the Thundercats have faith in him. Lion-O thanks his longtime friend as they head to the ship with the others bound for Eternia.

Mumm-Ra gloats as he holds up the sword as Adam remains impaled on it, saying he can sense all evil as well as a lack of evil. Adam's lack of it was the beacon that allowed Mumm-Ra to find him and probe his mind to take a form Adam trusted to give up the sword. Adam manages to grip the sword and summon the power of Grayskull to transform into He-Man, healing his wounds. Mumm-Ra and He-Man battle as Mumm-Ra uses the sword against both He-Man and Cringer. Just as He-Man gets the upper hand Mumm-Ra vanishes in a flash of light. He reappears in a dark corridor and hears the Ancient Spirits of Evil speaking to someone. The Spirits say that both the sword and Mumm-Ra are his to do with what he pleases as long as he fulfills his end of the bargain. Before Mumm-Ra can react he is blasted to dust and Skeletor reaches down and picks up the Power Sword telling the Spirits they have a deal.

Skeletor retreats to his lab with Mumm-Ra's helmet full of ashes and the Sword of Power and begins working. He quickly finds that, despite his condition, Mumm-Ra is still alive. Amused, Skeletor tells Mumm-Ra that he found out about the Spirits through the Golden Disks of Knowledge and struck a deal with them: the Power Sword and Mumm-Ra in exchange for freedom from the Black Pyramid, something Mumm-Ra was never able to do. He-Man and Cringer tend to King Randor who suddenly awakens in a panic worried about Adam. He-Man assures Randor that Adam is safe and that Adam is just as worried about him. Suddenly both men are attacked by the combine forces of both the Mutants of Third Earth and Skeletor's minions. After a furious battle that sees He-Man overcoming Evil Lynn's magic, the Mutants weapons, and physical attacks on all sides, He-Man defeats them all with help from Randor.

Back in Skeletor's lair at Snake Mountain he explains to Mumm-Ra that he could never wield the Power of Grayskull without it consuming him. But by mixing Mumm-Ra's ashes to a potion it will link Mumm-Ra's ever living power to him allowing him to use the Power Sword. Despite Mumm-Ra's protests Skeletor drinks the potion and summons the Power of Grayskull to him adding He-Man's strength to his own. He-Man suddenly is transformed back into Prince Adam and collapses in Randor's arms with the mortal wound still in his chest.

Skeletor revels in his newfound power saying that despite the fact he could not have gotten it without the Spirits help, he has no intention of freeing them from the Pyramid. Snake Mountain is suddenly rocked by an attack and a wall explodes in front of Skeletor, revealing the full team of Thundercats with Lion-O leading the charge.

Skeletor's strength initially pushes the Thundercats back and the battle is joined. All of them take turns in attacking Skeletor who laughs off the attempts saying they have no idea the power he now wields. Lion-O attacks and manages to wound Skeletor while Skeletor slashes Lion-O's eye with the Power Sword.

In the midst of battle Mumm-Ra tries to assert dominance now he, in ash form, has been bonded to Skeletor. Skeletor tells Mumm-Ra to back off as he is fighting Mumm-Ra's mortal enemies but it is too late. Lion-O realizes the two are bonded and uses Mumm-Ra's weakness against his own reflection to drive Skeletor off and retrieve the Power Sword.

Skeletor manages to teleport away trying to regain control from Mumm-Ra and the two fight an internal battle for their now shared form. Mumm-Ra manages to take command and reassume his original form but in doing so loses Skeletor the power he received from the sword. The two quickly realize they are too evenly matched and bonded thanks to the potion and Skeletor says he has a way they can both get what they want. Lion-O and the Thundercats arrive at the damaged Eternos to find all the heroes in morning as Adam has died from his wounds. Shocked that he was unable to return the Power Sword to its rightful owner Lion-O speaks alone with King Randor. Lion-O says he had heard Randor's son was a great hero and Randor says he didn't know Adam was He-Man and is only now realizing himself what a hero Adam was. Lion-O tells Randor that despite not knowing he is sure Adam felt the love of a father from him. Randor thanks Lion-O and tells him in turn not to worry about living up to anyone's ideals but to be a ruler from his own heart.

The city is suddenly rocked by another earthquake and everyone present looks up to find four massive giants attacking the city. Mumm-Ra and Skeletor have used their combined power and knowledge to free the Ancient Spirits of Evil and take control of them and now have set them loose to attack Eternia and take the power of Castle Grayskull.

Lion-O pledges the Thundercats aid to help Randor fight off the giants as the two different groups banter. Lion-O sees the Mutant leader Slithe brought in after his defeat at He-Man's hands and the Mutant mocks Lion-O saying he will never beat Mumm-Ra because he can come back from death time and again.

Slithe's comment gives Lion-O an idea and he orders the Thundercats to help Randor and Eternia's heroes defend Grayskull. He then takes Adam's body and flies back to Third Earth with Cringer, who refuses to leave Adam's side. They arrive at Mumm-Ra's Black Pyramid and find that some of the evil warriors who attacked He-Man retreated here to loot Mumm-Ra's treasures while he is away. Lion-O and Cringer manage to get Adam's body and the Sword of Power into Mumm-Ra's sarcophagus in the hopes it will bring Adam back as it has Mumm-Ra. When nothing happens at first Lion-O tells Cringer to check on the villains looting the Pyramid and uses the Sword of Omens power to transform Cringer into a version of his Battle Cat form.

Now alone, Lion-O prays his efforts will work and then hears a scratching inside the sarcophagus. He hears a whisper of Adam calling the power of Grayskull and the sarcophagus explodes and an enraged He-Man comes out and attacks Lion-O. Realizing the combination of power has healed He-Man but also driven him insane, Lion-O defends himself with the Sword of Omens and the two heroes clash. Lion-O separates He-Man from the Power Sword but He-Man is too strong and nearly drowns Lion-O in Mumm-Ra's mystic pool before the Thundercat can escape. Realizing he has to increase his own power to survive Lion-O calls for the Sword of Omens to give him Power Beyond Power. Now more matched in strength Lion-O manages to wrestle He-Man from behind and put the Sword of Omens in front of him, giving He-Man sight beyond sight. Seeing a horrifying future vision where Mumm-Ra and Skeletor have killed or enslaved everything snaps He-Man out of his madness and he thanks Lion-O as the two introduce themselves.

The two heroes find Cringer, transformed back to his normal form, happily licking his paw over the defeated villains and Cringer runs into He-Man's arms thrilled his best friend is alive. The three rush back to the ship desperate to get back to Eternia before it is too late. The four Ancient Spirits of Evil have arrived on the doorstep of Castle Grayskull while Skeletor and Mumm-Ra look on. Randor has assembled an army alongside the Thundercats and the combined heroes attack the giants. Man-At-Arms, Tygra, and Panthro assemble a cannon of combined Eternian and Thundarian tech to attack the Spirits while the others buy them time.

Inside the Castle the Sorceress summons the Castle's defenses to shield it from attack when Jaga's spirit form arrives. Jaga tells the Sorceress that he believes there is a way to stop the Spirits but the answer lies on the Thundercat's destroyed home world of Thundara. The Sorceress opens a portal in space and time for Jaga and her to slip through and get the item they need. Outside, despite the hero's best efforts, the Spirits close in on Castle Grayskull. When Man-At-Arms, Tygra, and Panthro fire the cannon at one of the Spirit's head it simply laughs off the attempt and turns to attack the castle. Tygra then uses his powers of illusion to make Grayskull seem to disappear much to the Spirit's confusion and Mumm-Ra and Skeletor's frustration.

Jaga and the Sorceress appear to the heroes and tell them that Jaga knew of a Golden Disk of Knowledge among the treasures of Thundara. The two use the retrieved Disk to expose that Skeletor and Mumm-Ra used Skeletor's Disks of Knowledge to bring the Spirits to physical form and each of the four Spirits have a Disk on their chest which Jaga and the Sorceress now expose. If the heroes destroy the Disks the Spirits will be defeated. Teela and Cheetara take a flyer and attack one of the Spirits and are saved when Cheetara's sixth sense allows them to avoid an energy blast. Teela sets the flyer to crash into the disk and as both escape the first Spirit is destroyed. Orko manages to accidentally enlarge Snarf, who hits the Disk on the second Spirit, stopping it as well.

Wilikit and Wilicat join Buzz-Off and Stratos to attack the third Spirit and after Buzz-Off and Stratos are injured in the distraction WiliKit and Kat break the Disk stopping the third Spirit.

Meanwhile, Tygra collapses, unable to hold the illusion any longer, and Castle Grayskull is revealed in front of the final Spirit. The Spirit attacks the Castle and the Sorceress manages to hold a protective shield to keep the Castle safe. Panthro and Man-At-Arms aim the cannon at the Spirit and fire, knocking it back. Before they can fire again the Spirit grabs Man-At-Arms and Panthro leaps to free him. While the Spirit is distracted by the two Tygra manages to aim the cannon at the Disk and fire, destroying the last Spirit. As the heroes celebrate, Skeletor watches and comments to Mumm-Ra that the Spirits did better than expected. But now that they have weakened the heroes it is time for the two's true plan to be completed. Combining their power Skeletor and Mumm-Ra absorb the power of the Spirits as they begin to fade and use the power to form themselves into an amalgamated being now called Mummator. The now super charged Mummator attacks the weakened heroes.

He-Man, Lion-O, and Cringer, now transformed back to Battle Cat, arrive at the battle but too late. They find all the heroes defeated and wounded and Grayskull's drawbridge open and exposed. He-Man tells Battle Cat to look after their friends and He-Man and Lion-O rush into the Castle. He-Man guides Lion-O through the maze of Castle Grayskull saying it is a nexus of worlds and reality through space and time and they must find the Sorceress before it's too late. They arrive at a shattered door that shocks He-Man as he says no intruder has ever gotten so far into the Castle. Both heroes charge forward and find the newly formed Mummator imprisoning the Sorceress and holding an orb that is the heart of the Castle, the key to all the power that Greyskull possess. Mummator says that he has won and only needs He-Man's Sword of Power to unlock the orb and gain the power to control reality throughout the Multiverse.

He-Man and Lion-O attack but realize that they need to get the orb and the Sword away from Mummator. Lion-O says that since the Castle is a nexus of realities they can use it to get Mummator away from the orb.

Together the heroes push Mummator off an edge and the three plunge downward only to land in an Eternia that is controlled by Mummator. Taking advantage of Mummator's confusion He-Man gets the orb and he and Lion-O use the orb's connection to Grayskull to teleport away. They appear in a newsroom and find themselves in a reality where He-man is based on Earth as a Superman like hero. When Mummator appears both He-Man and Lion-O grasp the orb together to use their combine will to get back to the Castle.

Instead they find themselves in a reality where He-Man and Lion-O's allies have merged. Mummator takes advantage of their surprise and manages to get He-Man's Sword before Lion-O uses the orb to get them away again.

As they arrive in a new reality they realize Mummator will follow now he has the Sword but Lion-O looks down and sees where they are. They have arrived on Thundara before it exploded and Lion-O sees his father stay behind as the young Lion-O, Jaga, and the other Thundercats escape the planet. Shaken and surprised Lion-O is attacked by Mummator and as the three grapple they arrive back inside Grayskull as Mummator manages to get the orb from Lion-O.

Now, with both the Sword and the orb, Mummator summons all his minions, Mutants and Skeletor's allies alike to attack He-Man and Lion-O while he activates the orb. But the Sorceress, who managed to get free while they traveled realities, summon the recovered heroes to support Lion-O and He-Man.

Mummator starts to unlock the orb and the Power of Grayskull begins to flow into him. Even He-Man begins to weaken as his power is taken. Lion-O manages to slash Mummator's wrist and get the Power Sword back but it is too late to stop the orb from unlocking. Realizing they have one last chance He-Man and Lion-O risk combining the remaining power of Grayskull in He-Man and the Power Sword with the Sword of Omens even though both realized it could destroy them both. He-Man fires his power into the Sword of Omens as together he and Lion-O summon the Power Beyond Power at Mummator. The resulting blast of energy overwhelms Mummator and blasts him apart into Skeletor and Mumm-Ra before disintegrating both beings.

The resulting blast transforms He-Man back into Adam but seals the orb and both the Sorceress and Jaga claim victory for the heroes. Lion-O looks and sees a portal back to Thundara and is desperate to return and save his father and his world saying he won't run away again. Adam gently holds his friend back saying he could go back and save his father but would be changing the here and now. Adam tells Lion-O that his destiny lies in the future not in the past... just as Lion-O's father would have wanted. Lion-O reluctantly agrees as Randor watches both young men from a distance in pride.

Later the heroes exchanges thanks and gifts as they load the Mutants onto the Thundercats ship and Skeletor's evil warriors onto a prison ship. Lion-O says he is sorry to go but they must return before third Earth snaps back to where it belongs. Adam, now returned to his He-Man form, thanks his new friend saying it will be odd now that Randor and everyone knows his secret. Lion-O says its best fathers and sons have no secrets so that Randor can know Adam as the hero he has always been. When He-Man says that Lion-O is wise for his age Lion-O sheepishly tells He-Man he is in fact twelve years old in mind and living in an adult body. Astonished, He-Man says that if he is this wise as a boy then he will be even greater as a man later in life.

As the Thundercat ship takes off He-Man and Lion-O shout the other hero's battle cry in farewell.

== Reception ==
The comic has received mostly positive reviews.
