= Batman/Teenage Mutant Ninja Turtles =

Crossover comic book mini-series

- Textless cover of Batman/Teenage Mutant Ninja Turtles #1 (December 2015). Art by Freddie E. Williams II.

Publication information
- Publisher: DC Comics; IDW Publishing
- Schedule: Monthly
- Format: Limited series
- Genre: Superhero
- Publication date: December 2015 – May 2016
- No. of issues: 6
- Main character(s): Batman; Teenage Mutant Ninja Turtles; Splinter; Robin; Shredder; Ra's al Ghul; Bane; Krang; Joker

Creative team
- Written by: James Tynion IV
- Artist: Freddie E. Williams II

Batman/Teenage Mutant Ninja Turtles is a six-issue intercompany crossover comic book miniseries featuring fictional heroes Batman and the IDW incarnation of the Teenage Mutant Ninja Turtles. The series was written by James Tynion IV and illustrated by Freddie E. Williams II.

A film adaptation, Batman vs. Teenage Mutant Ninja Turtles, was released in March 2019.

== Publication history ==
The collaboration between DC Comics and IDW Publishing was announced during IDW's panel at the 2015 San Diego Comic-Con. A six-part monthly miniseries was written by James Tynion IV and drawn by Freddie Williams II. In addition, the Teenage Mutant Ninja Turtles' co-creator Kevin Eastman provided some of the variant covers.

== Batman/Teenage Mutant Ninja Turtles ==
=== Overview ===
The Turtles and their arch-enemy Shredder have been transported to an alternate universe by Krang. Here, in Gotham City, they meet Batman and clash with a series of members of his famous "rogues gallery" while attempting to find their way home.

=== Plot ===
During a battle with the alien conqueror Krang, the Turtles, their master Splinter, and their archenemy Shredder are transported to an alternate universe with a good number of Foot Clan ninjas. While the Foot attempt to steal various components from labs all around Gotham to work out a means of returning home, as well as abducting a scientist doing research into cross-dimensional travel, the Turtles intercept the various thefts, although the Foot still departs with their gathered equipment. Batman is puzzled by the inhuman descriptions of some of the participants and at the fact that the crimes were committed by ninjas. Predicting a break-in at one of his own facilities, he takes out the raiding Foot ninjas and has a brief encounter with Shredder before the latter retreats.

The Turtles have in the meantime set up a new base in the Gotham sewers, but Killer Croc stumbles upon their lair while tracking Batman. After defeating Croc and his men, the Turtles are forced to relocate, since their hideout has been compromised. The Turtles retreat to the surface to discover the Batmobile parking nearby. When Batman returns to his car from his confrontation with Shredder, he finds the Turtles milling about and fights them until Splinter distracts Batman with a smoke bomb. The Turtles begin to research Batman, and most of them come to admire him, while Raphael just believes him to be a distraction. Having recovered one of Raphael's sai during the fight, Batman takes it to Lucius Fox. Fox's analysis confirms that the dagger is from another universe, but it is reverting to this reality's 'local' version of steel. He also notes that a strange mutagen in a blood sample that Bruce provided him with is incompatible with their laws of physics and anything mutated by it will thus revert to its non-mutated state.

Learning about a stolen power generator that could allow them to power the equipment they need to return home, Shredder and the Foot make a deal with the Penguin to acquire it, only for the Foot to kill all of the Penguin's men. However, the Penguin convinces Shredder to spare him by arguing that he can provide useful local knowledge.

Unbeknownst to Batman, Splinter has followed him into the Batcave and learned of their situation and Batman's identity. Reuniting with the Turtles, Splinter leads his sons to the Batcave to ask for help. Although Batman is initially hostile, Splinter catches Batman off guard by calling him by his real name, which helps them form an uneasy peace. Splinter and the Turtles subsequently lead an assault on the Iceberg Lounge, where Shredder intends to activate a portal that will return him to his world, also planning to create a permanent link between their worlds so that he can conquer New York and Gotham. However, when the Turtles and Batman attack, Shredder destroys the portal and kills the scientist who helped him build it, revealing that he also knows of the mutants' impending reversion. Raphael engages Shredder in battle, but Shredder injures Raphael and escapes, only to be met by the League of Assassins and Ra's al Ghul, who offers him an alliance.

With Shredder unaccounted for, the Turtles remain in the Batcave and Wayne Manor. In his growing impatience, Raphael snaps at the lack of progress made in finding a cure, accusing Batman of being simply "a rich boy playing at being a hero" with no idea about true loss and sacrifice, and storms off in a huff. While Raphael is walking through Gotham in disguise, Batman pulls up beside him in the Batmobile and takes him to Crime Alley, where he tells Raphael about the death of his parents and how that loss drove him to become Batman. As Raphael considers this, realizing how wrong he was about Batman, he apologizes and finally starts to accept Batman, the other Turtles alert him to an energy surge in Gotham that they identified as another portal, constructed and activated by Ra's and Shredder. At the portal they meet Casey Jones, who has attempted to bring his friends fresh mutagen to stabilize their condition, but was stopped by the villains, who stole the substance and took it with them to Arkham Asylum.

Batman, Leonardo, and Raphael meet with Commissioner Gordon at the roof of the GCPD and learn that the Penguin has turned informer, revealing that Shredder and Ra's are intending to attack Arkham. As Leonardo collapses due to the decaying mutagen in his system, Damian returns to the Batcave to find Donatello, Michelangelo, and Casey inside, resulting in a brief fight between them until Batman returns to confirm that the Turtles are his allies. As Damian reports that the League of Assassins is coming to Gotham en masse, Casey reveals that he was provided with equipment that would allow the Turtles to return to their dimension and Batman tells the Turtles to get home before Leonardo's condition becomes irreversible. Despite Splinter's warning, Batman and Damian head to Arkham, confident that they can beat Shredder, only to be confronted by a mass of mutagen-contaminated Arkham inmates (Mr. Freeze as a polar bear, Bane as an elephant, Scarecrow as a crow, Two-Face as a baboon, etc.), who move in for the attack.

During the resulting fight, Batman is trapped by the mutated Mr. Freeze and Poison Ivy. Confronted by al Ghul and Shredder, he learns that the two archvillains intend to use the mutagen in every major city of the world, throwing human civilization in chaos and thus paving their ascent to total world domination. Watching all of this via security camera in the Batcave, the Turtles decide to stay and risk their lives to save Batman, despite being given the chance to escape back to their own dimension with Casey. The Turtles arrive just as the Joker is about to kill Batman, and while Splinter fights off the remaining inmates, Batman battles Shredder inside his latest Intimidator combat armor and the Turtles engage Ra's al Ghul. Although Shredder severely injures Batman and damages the Intimidator suit, Batman manages to knock his opponent to the ground and Splinter finishes him off. With the Turtles beating him down, and the League of Assassins disarmed and captured by Damian and the G.C.P.D., al Ghul escapes.

Just as the Turtles wonder how they will get back home, a dimensional portal opens and disgorges Casey and April O'Neil. The Turtles round up the Foot ninjas and Shredder and send them back to their original dimension. Before they leave, Raphael gives Batman his mask and tells him that he can now count on the Turtles' aid if he ever shows up in their dimension. Batman and Robin return to the Batcave where they learn from Commissioner Gordon that the situation at Arkham is being stabilized until the mutagen has decayed naturally, turning the inmates back to normal within a week. Damian remembers that it is the anniversary of the death of Bruce's parents and volunteers to leave, but Bruce insists that he stay and they work on the Intimidator Suit together. The final panel shows Raphael's mask lying on the chair of the Batcomputer.

== Batman/Teenage Mutant Ninja Turtles II ==
On September 14, 2017, the impending publication of a six-issue sequel miniseries was announced, with the first two issues being released on December 6 and December 20, respectively. This storyline features Bane as the central antagonist. James Tynion IV and Freddie Williams II, who worked on the previous series, return as participants in the project.

=== Plot ===
Months after the events of the first crossover, a battle for new leadership of the Foot Clan ensues between the Elite Guard and Shredder's descendant Karai, since the Turtles threw Shredder in prison after returning home. The Turtles confront Karai and the Elite Guard in a New York City Subway tunnel, where Karai escapes and Donatello is rescued by his brothers after failing to defeat the Elite Guardsmen. Back at the lair, Casey and April mend Donatello's wounds and warn the Turtles not to leave the sewers, as Bebop and Rocksteady have formed a third faction of the Foot that wants the Turtles dead. Donatello tells Splinter of his shame of not being as good of a fighter as his brothers and wonders how someone like Batman can balance being a technological genius and master combatant. Hitting upon this idea, he sneaks out of the sewers to Harold Lillja's laboratory, where he activates an experimental multiversal teleportation system to send a message to the Dark Knight, hoping to learn some wisdom from him. The Elite Guardsmen attack Donatello in the lab and wreck some of the fragile technology during the fight.

Meanwhile, in Gotham, Batman and Robin likewise deal with a shift in power within the League of Assassins, since a faction no longer trusts Ra's as their leader following his defeat by the Ninja Turtles. They learn of another Lazarus Pit beneath the city and find the faction's new leader, Bane, emerging from it. Before the Dynamic Duo can engage the now stronger villain, the Foot's attack on Donatello causes the teleportation system to malfunction and Donatello and Bane to switch places.

A week later, the three heroes manage to find all the parts necessary to build the multiversal portal back to Donatello's home dimension. Batman obtains one part from Ra's (who gives it willingly, if only for the slim chance of being able to rid himself of Batman and Bane in one go) while Robin and Donatello get the last part from Mr. Freeze. Batgirl and Lucius Fox finish constructing the portal and tell the trio that they will turn it on once for a minute every 24 hours to avoid any other intruders. Batman leaves Batgirl in charge of protecting Gotham as the three enter the portal.

Once they enter the Turtles' dimension, they discover that Bane has nearly conquered the city and taken over a large majority of the Foot Clan, including Bebop and Rocksteady. They reunite with the Turtles, Splinter, April, and Casey in the sewer. Raphael expresses outrage at Donatello's mistake that resulted in the city's chaos, but Splinter calms him down and welcomes Batman into their home. April shows the group footage she got of Bane on her phone to determine his movement patterns. Batman observes that Bane's Venom tank on his back is nearly empty and proposes they attack in the next 24 hours, where Bane will be at his most vulnerable. Back at the Foot lair, however, Bane has Bebop and Rocksteady bring him the disgraced scientist Baxter Stockman to create more Venom.

Damian remains in the Turtles' lair and plunges Donatello back into depression through merciless criticism, which sparks a duel between him and Raphael. Batman, Leonardo, and Splinter reconnoiter Stockman's laboratory, where they find Bane in the midst of withdrawal from his lack of Venom. However, Bane is not that incapacitated as to miss their arrival and leaving to get the others; and as soon as the heroes are gone, he and Stockman initiate the next phase of their plan to inject the whole Foot Clan with a newly synthesized Venom-mutagen compound. Thus, when the Turtles, Batman, Splinter, and Robin return to the laboratory, they walk right into an ambush; when Bebop and Rocksteady trigger the trap, they accidentally expose Stockman to a mixture of mutagen and fly DNA, turning him into a humanoid fly. Quickly the heroes find themselves surrounded not only by Bane, Bebop, and Rocksteady but also the rest of the Foot Clan, all of them vastly enhanced with both Venom and mutagen.

Facing these insurmountable odds, Batman attempts to execute an escape tactic, but Robin dashes that prospect with a reckless attack on Bebop, thus triggering a mass brawl. During the fighting, Bane singles out Raphael, beats him down, and prepares to break him over his knee, as he had done with Batman once before. Splinter intervenes, saving his son, but his concern for Raphael diverts his attention for a critical moment, enabling Bane to bring the lab's ceiling crashing down on him. Bane and his cohorts retreat to preserve their limited Venom supply, enabling the Turtles to recover their seriously injured father.

Back in the lair, a despairing Donatello begins to believe that brains and skill alone will not defeat Bane. He presents a sample of Venom-mutagen he was able to swipe from the lab, along with the intention to synthesize it for their own use; but Batman and most of his friends express their misgivings, forcing him to abandon that plan. As the two teams begin to work on an attack strategy late into the night, however, Donatello secretly sneaks out of the lair with the compound and injects himself with it. In the meantime, Karai and her remaining Foot loyalists begin to stage their own assault on Bane's new headquarters, the Statue of Liberty.

As a group of Bane's Foot ninjas begin to assemble in order to finalize their master's hold on the city, they are attacked at their meeting place by Donatello, turned into a savage rage monster by the Venom-mutagen. However, Batman and Leonardo have noticed his absence and followed his trail, and now desperately try to talk him down. They succeed, after much effort, by appealing to his scientific side when they reveal that they have found a flaw in Stockman's Venom formula; Donatello, now restored to sanity, notices that Stockman's concoction is imperfect, thus using itself up more rapidly than the standard Venom version.

In the meantime, April, Casey, and Michelangelo complete the construction of an interdimensional portal and activate it, allowing Raphael, Robin, and Splinter to pass into the DC reality, where Batgirl and Nightwing are waiting for them. They descend to the Lazarus Pit beneath Gotham and expose Splinter to its essence to heal his life-threatening injuries. With Splinter and Donatello fully recovered, the two away teams regroup in the Turtles' hideout, just as Bane starts a city-wide broadcast in which he announces that he has taken control of all of New York and demands that its citizens either join his army or subjugate themselves as his slaves. Donatello develops an anti-Venom, which he uses to purge himself of the drug and which he then intends to release from a gas bomb amidst Bane's army on Liberty Island, thus stripping them of their advantage in one stroke. Still, knowing the Foot Clan will remain loyal to Bane unless he is beaten, Batman proceeds to Rikers Island and frees Shredder from his cell.

Donatello enacts his plan by flying the Turtle Blimp towards the Statue of Liberty and releasing the Anti-Venom gas from its balloon to depower the Foot Clan. While the rest of the group emerges to free the captive citizens and take on the rest of the turned Foot, assisted by Donatello's electroshock guns and Karai's loyalist faction, Batman, Splinter, and Shredder battle Bane at the Statue of Liberty. Shredder regains control over the Foot, and the heroes defeat Bane, Bebop and Rocksteady using teamwork and a massive dosage of elephant tranquilizer. Much to the Turtles' surprise, Shredder willingly goes back to prison after the fight, with Batman revealing that he helped on the condition that he would have a beforehand rematch with the Dark Knight. When saying their goodbyes, Batman reassures Donatello that his mistakes and his efforts to rectify them have only served to show him where his true strengths lie, and the Bat-Family and Bane return to their homeworld. Soon afterward, Donatello finds in his dormitory a note from Batman containing a workout routine for the Robins, which Donatello enthusiastically starts to implement.

== Batman/Teenage Mutant Ninja Turtles III ==
The publication of a third and final installment of the successful crossover storyline was announced on February 15, 2019, for May in the same year. In this series, Krang is installed as Batman and the Turtles' main adversary.

=== Plot ===
The story starts in Gotham City, but strangely presents a peculiar amalgamation of the DC Universe and the Turtles' universe. Batman was raised by Splinter alongside the Turtles as a family, Casey Jones is an officer in the Gotham City Police Department, and other influences from the Turtles' reality are also found in various elements of Gotham's scenery. All this is due to Krang's merciless meddling with the fabric of the Multiverse.

In a new background story, it is shown that when Bruce was 8 years old, his parents purchased the Turtles right after their fateful cinema visit, only to come across Joe Chill just having hijacked a truck full of mutagen. Thomas and Martha were run over by the speeding truck, but Bruce was barely pushed to safety by his father. A canister of mutagen was thrown out of the truck and shattered, and in his shock over his parents' death, Bruce accidentally toppled into the sewer. The Turtles and Splinter, a sewer rat, were subsequently transformed into their known mutant forms and took Bruce into their fold.

One stormy night many years later, the "Laughing Man" (the Joker fused with Shredder) and his "Smile Clan" (consisting of Harley Quinn fused with Karai, Deadshot, Clayface fused with Rocksteady and Killer Croc fused with Bebop) undertake a raid on Gotham's natural history museum, where a strange crystal, said to be extradimensional, is displayed. When the GCPD arrives, all the officers - except Casey - have succumbed to the Laughing Man's offer to join the Smile Clan. Batman takes notice of the raid and proceeds to the museum, followed by the Turtles; they manage to take out most of the henchmen, but the Laughing Man gets his hands on the crystal. As Batman struggles with him, he suddenly has a brief vision of the Laughing Man's true face - the Joker - before the villain and Harley escape by detonating the museum's roof.

Later in their sewer hideout, Batman laments the distraction which allowed the Laughing Man to get away, the peculiar familiarity he felt when he beheld the Joker's face, and some strange dreams he has had for some time about a young human male who is oddly familiar to him, even though he does not recall his name. Splinter - his butler - gently rebuilds Bruce's confidence, but the team is suddenly confronted by a strange visitor - Raphael from the Mirage reality - who tells them that Krang is messing with them all in order to weaken and finally destroy them, and they have to do something about it.

At first, Batman and the Turtles do not believe the "intruder", but by giving them a dimension portal activator, Mirage-Raphael provides them with the means of confirming his story. Krang has invaded both the Mirage and the DC Universes in order to fuse them into a reality which he could control at will; in order to have them out of the way and to gloat at them over his achievement, Krang defeated the Anti-Monitor and outfitted the Technodrome with anti-matter technology (as well as turned the Anti-Monitor's corpse into a giant exo-suit for himself) and captured the Mirage-Turtles and the Pre-Crisis Batman. The Pre-Crisis Batman managed to free himself and the Turtles, but in the ensuing struggle with Krang's robot troopers, only Raphael managed to escape and, after a long journey through the Turtle-Multiverse, find the mixed-up new reality. Now, Batman and the Turtles must come to terms that their world is an artificially created illusion. Batman departs for the ruined Wayne Manor, where he runs into Alfred, who is still guarding the house. As they meet, both regain the memory of their true origin, and Batman - now back to his original grim self - enters the cave below Wayne Manor to prepare for the upcoming fight.

In the meantime, Mirage-Raphael suggests that the first step to right this interdimensional mess is to contact April, an assistant worker at Baxter Stockman's laboratory. However, Krang is fully aware that Mirage-Raphael is on the verge of foiling his plans, and recruits the "Laughing Man" under the pretense of giving him the means to conquer Gotham. The Smile Clan ambushes April, but the five Turtles intervene. In the course of the battle, April comes in contact with Donatello and, like Batman, regains her true memories. However, Mirage-Raphael is captured, and the Smile Clan disappears, but not before Mirage-Raphael can give his counterparts the hint that the next step to set things right is that the Smile Clan must become the Foot Clan. And so the Turtles seek out the Oroku Saki and try to convince him of his true origin.

In a short time, Shredder succeeds in reawakening the true memories of his Foot Clan soldiers and destroying the Laughing Man's operations in New Gotham, although tensions rise between him and his erstwhile allies since Batman believes that they will need the Joker as the final piece in their plot to spoil Krang's plan, while Shredder simply wants him dead. Meanwhile, the Laughing Man turns to Krang for aid, who gives him a Mother Box to summon his droid armies from the Technodrome, in exchange for Batman and the Turtles' demise.

Later on, the Laughing Man attacks Gotham City Police Headquarters to eliminate Casey Jones, but is confronted by the Turtles and Casey, who has had his memory and gear returned to him by April just in time. After the Turtles taunt him and show him the face of his new rival, the Laughing Man retreats. Batman contacts Commissioner Gordon through a hologram, thereby restoring the latter's memories, and relates his plan to lure the Laughing Man to Ace Chemicals - the place where the Joker was "born" - in order to restore his memories.

Later at Ace Chemicals, the Joker and his remaining henchmen raid the facility until Shredder appears. When Batman intervenes, the Laughing Man throws a grenade which destroys the catwalk that he is standing on. Batman tries to save him, but the Laughing Man refuses and willingly drops himself into a tank of chemicals below. The Joker emerges as his old, twisted self again but, reveling in the idea of causing ultimate chaos, he activates Krang's Mother Box, opening a portal through which Krang's army begins to stream. In the midst of this chaotic battle, Batman wrests the Mother Box from the Joker, but a sudden vision of the death of Jason Todd makes him realize that this will not be enough to win the fight. While Batman removes himself from the scene of the battle, which is joined by the reformed Foot Clan, the IDW-Turtles go through the portal and end up in the Technodrome, where they free their Mirage-counterparts and the original Batman.

In the meantime, Splinter, April, and Alfred go looking for their wayward friend and find him near the activated Bat-Signal, right as Krang and his Technodrome appear in the amalgamated universe to destroy New Gotham and rebuild this reality from scratch. Just as the two Donatellos find out how to reverse the changes that Krang has made to the Multiverse, the alien tyrant finds them. But before he can do anything, the Turtles activate the Mother Box, and through the portal step Batman and the allies that he has summoned: Nightwing, Batgirl, the Red Hood, Damian Wayne, and Tim Drake. As the battle rages, the damage the two teams have inflicted on Krang's dimensional amalgamation tower begins to initiate the separation of the two realities. This forces the Pre-Crisis Batman and the Mirage-Turtles to disengage from the fight and get sent home through dimensional portals, lest the universal splicing would rip them apart as well unless they are back in their native realities.

After their originals are gone, Batman initiates the detonation of Krang's tower and thus the final stage of the separation process. Krang makes a last-ditch attempt by directly bombarding Batman and the Turtles with the unleashed energy, but their newfound sense for family enables them to overcome this effect. Right after they evacuate the Technodrome via boom tubes, the Technodrome - with Krang still inside it - is torn apart by the explosion. Before the Turtles, Splinter, April and Casey fade back into their reality, Batman expresses his gratitude to Splinter and his sons for having made him a part of their family. Following the complete separation of both realities, Batman invites the rest of the Bat-family to the Batcave for a round of pizza and a day off.

== Spin-off ==
=== Batman/Teenage Mutant Ninja Turtles Adventures ===
The success of the original miniseries inspired the concept for a similar crossover story, titled Batman/Teenage Mutant Ninja Turtles Adventures, with Batman's DC Animated Universe incarnation encountering the Amazing Adventures comic version of the 2012 CGI series' Turtles. Author Matthew K. Manning (Beware the Batman) and artist Jon Sommariva (Teenage Mutant Ninja Turtles: Amazing Adventures) were named as participants in the project. The concept was first introduced at San Diego Comic-Con in late July 2016, and was published as a six-issue miniseries starting November 9, 2016.

In this crossover, interdimensional portals open at Arkham Asylum and most of Batman's rogues' gallery reach New York City and unleash their own brand of mayhem upon the Turtles. Noteworthy is the confrontation between the respective heroes’ best-known enemies Shredder and The Joker; his escape from Arkham includes an in-joke where he is interrupted by Harley Quinn while reading a book by M. Hamill (a nod reference to Joker voice actor Mark Hamill).

== Collected Editions ==
| Title | Material collected | Published date | ISBN |
|---|---|---|---|
| Batman/Teenage Mutant Ninja Turtles | Batman/Teenage Mutant Ninja Turtles #1-6 | August 2017 | 978-1401271503 |
| Batman/Teenage Mutant Ninja Turtles II | Batman/Teenage Mutant Ninja Turtles II #1-6 | August 2018 | 978-1401280314 |
| Batman/Teenage Mutant Ninja Turtles III | Batman/Teenage Mutant Ninja Turtles III #1-6 | April 2020 | 978-1779500632 |
| Batman/Teenage Mutant Ninja Turtles Omnibus | Batman/Teenage Mutant Ninja Turtles #1-6, Batman/Teenage Mutant Ninja Turtles II #1-6, Batman/Teenage Mutant Ninja Turtles III #1-6 | August 2023 | 978-1779513403 |

== In other media ==
=== Film ===
==== Batman vs. Teenage Mutant Ninja Turtles ====
On May 14, 2019, an adaptation of Batman/Teenage Mutant Ninja Turtles was released as a direct-to-video film by Warner Bros. Animation, under the title of Batman vs. Teenage Mutant Ninja Turtles. The adaptation is based on the same events of the first volume, but the plot was rewritten after the writers redefined the Turtles as existing in the same universe as Batman. The plot therefore focuses on the two groups coming together to thwart the plans of Ra's al Ghul and Shredder to throw Gotham into chaos through the use of mutagen combined with the Joker's Joker venom.

Because of the changes in the plot, the adaptation features notable differences between it and the first miniseries:

- Several characters are omitted, including Lucius Fox, Splinter, Casey Jones, and April O'Neil, though Splinter did appear in a flashback, when Leonardo told Batman the origin of the sato oshi strike, and a slight nod to April was made via a calendar the turtles have in their car.
- Barbara Gordon/Batgirl is added into the plot. She provides assistance to Batman, including relaying information about the theft at Powers Industrial and the sighting of the Turtles during the crime.
- The Turtles and Batman share the same universe rather than different universes/realities as in the comic book miniseries, which removes said miniseries' plot point of the Turtles' desperate need to return to their own universe, as staying in the DC universe will end up killing them, because the mutagen that created them is considered an anomaly.
- The Penguin attempts to steal the next item at Wayne Enterprises, but is thwarted by the Turtles. The break-in at Arkham is relayed purely by James Gordon; the Penguin plays no part in it.
- As Splinter is not involved, the discovery of the Batcave is made by Donatello through research into Batman.
- The battles between Leonardo and Ra's al Ghul and between Batman and Shredder take place at Ace Chemicals; the break-in at Arkham and the fight with the mutated inmates is a distraction to conceal the main villain's efforts to steal the final component and complete their plan.
- The Joker injects Batman with a dose of mutagen mixed with his Joker venom, which results in the Turtles, Robin, and Batgirl attempting to cure him with an untested anti-mutagen.
- Shredder's defeat results in him falling into a vat of chemicals. The final scene, after the credits, shows he survives but has suffered a transformation similar to that of the Joker.

=== Video games ===
==== Injustice 2 ====
The Teenage Mutant Ninja Turtles were made playable DLC characters in the DC crossover fighting game Injustice 2.
