= Freddie Williams II =

Comic book illustrator

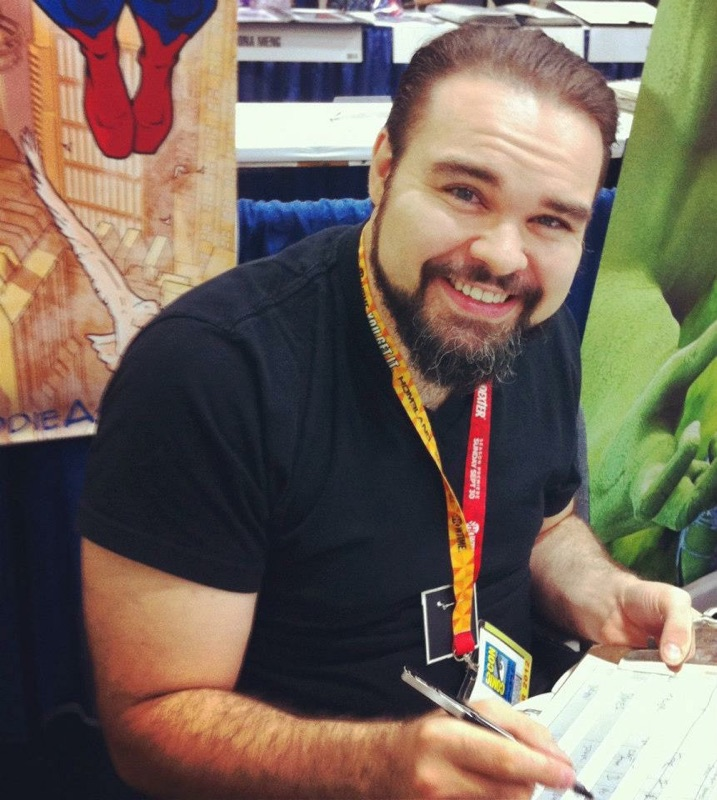
- Williams at the 2012 San Diego Comic-Con
- Born: May 30, 1977 (age 49) Kansas City, Missouri, U.S.
- Areas: Penciller, Inker
- Notable works: Seven Soldiers: Mr. Miracle; Batman/Teenage Mutant Ninja Turtles; He-Man/ThunderCats; Injustice vs. Masters of the Universe; Turtles of Grayskull

Freddie E. Williams II (born May 30, 1977) is an American comic book artist.

Williams entered the comic scene in 2005, when he began work with DC Comics on Seven Soldiers: Mister Miracle. He has since gone on to work on several crossover series, including Batman/Teenage Mutant Ninja Turtles, He-Man/ThunderCats, Injustice vs. Masters of the Universe, and Turtles of Grayskull.

== Early life ==
Williams was born in Little Rock, Arkansas, grew up in Kansas City, Kansas, and now lives in Lees Summit, Missouri, with his wife. He was raised in an impoverished single-parent home, and often dreamed of flying away like Superman. His sister supported his love of comics and his dream of becoming a comic book artist. Williams was inspired to become a comic book artist at the age of 15 after seeing Jim Lee's artwork in Uncanny X-Men #272.

== Career ==
While attending the 2005 San Diego Comic-Con, Williams submitted a portfolio to the DC Comics talent search. He was hired to do a few issues of Seven Soldiers featuring Mister Miracle, for which he won an Eisner Award. He is known for drawing characters such as Robin, the Flash, Green Arrow, Conan the Barbarian, Star-Lord, and Thor. Since then, he has illustrated Batman/Teenage Mutant Ninja Turtles, Batman/Teenage Mutant Ninja Turtles II, Batman/Teenage Mutant Ninja Turtles III, He-Man/ThunderCats and Injustice vs. Masters of the Universe.

In 2006, Williams signed an exclusive contract with DC Comics. He became the regular artist on Robin beginning with issue 149 in 2006, and began illustrating The Flash in early 2008.

Williams appears frequently on comic book-related podcasts including Comic Geek Speak, Half Hour Wasted, Raging Bullets, and Fanboy Radio. He also posted online tutorials about creating digital artwork in comics. The tutorials are available on his YouTube page.

On December 23, 2014, Williams was a featured guest on Episode 26 of the web show Best of the Worst by RedLetterMedia and has since made multiple appearances in RedLetterMedia's videos.

Williams is the author of a book about digital artwork, The DC Comics Guide to Digitally Drawing Comics.

=== Technique and materials ===
Williams trained in traditional art methods but is primarily a digital artist who uses a "hybrid method", as detailed in The DC Comics Guide to Digitally Drawing Comics. In addition to working digitally, he is also known for working in traditional media, including ink wash (diluted India ink). Williams has made a variety of "How To" videos listed as "work in progress" on his website, to demonstrate the methods he utilizes to create his artwork.

== Notes ==
Preceded by Daniel Acuña	Flash artist 2008	Succeeded by Paco Diaz
Preceded by Scott McDaniel	Robin artist 2006–2007	Succeeded by David Baldeon
