= Tower of Power (disambiguation) =

Tower of Power is an American R&B/soul/funk band from Oakland, California.

Tower of Power may also refer to:

- Tower of Power (album), a 1973 album by the band Tower of Power
- The Tower of Power!, a 1969 album by jazz saxophonist, Dexter Gordon
- Tower of Power (transmitter), a 236m tall radio and television transmitter tower built in the Philippines in 1988
- "Tower of Power," an episode from the Teenage Mutant Ninja Turtles animated TV series
- Superman: Tower of Power, a thrill ride located at two Six Flags amusement parks in the USA
- Tower of Power, an arcade game by Skee-Ball, Inc.
- Tower of Power, an S&M device alluded to in the Frank Zappa song "Bobby Brown Goes Down"
- Tower of Power, nickname for a display of three tabs of the United States Army
- Unofficial nickname for the "SEGA CD 32X", an augmented video game console setup created by attaching both a Sega CD and a 32X to a Sega Genesis/Mega Drive, especially the first shell versions, which were taller to begin with and stacked vertically on top of each other. It can also refer to the Sega CD and Sega Genesis stack with the Sonic & Knuckles and Sonic 3 cartridges inserted into the cartridge slot, giving a similarly towering appearance.
- Tower of Power, nickname for a series of inline 6 outboard motors from Mercury Marine

== See also ==
- Power tower
