= Too Hot to Handle =

Too Hot to Handle may refer to:

== Film ==
- Too Hot to Handle (1938 film), an American comedy-drama
- Too Hot to Handle, a 1955 American burlesque film
- Too Hot to Handle (1960 film), a British neo-noir crime thriller
- Too Hot to Handle (1977 film), an American exploitation film
- Too Hot to Handle (1991 film), or The Marrying Man, an American romantic comedy

== Literature ==
- Moonraker (novel), released in the U.S. as Too Hot to Handle, a 1955 James Bond novel by Ian Fleming
- Too Hot to Handle, a 2016 Romancing the Clarksons novel by Tessa Bailey

== Music ==
- Too Hot to Handle (Heatwave album) or the title song, 1977
- Too Hot to Handle (Jorma Kaukonen album) or the title song, 1985
- "Too Hot to Handle", a song by UFO from Lights Out, 1977

== Television ==
- Too Hot to Handle (TV series), a 2020–2024 British reality dating game show
- "Too Hot to Handle" (Ben 10: Ultimate Alien), a 2010 episode
- "Too Hot to Handle" (The Dreamstone), a 1990 episode
- "Too Hot to Handle" (Robin Hood), a 2009 episode
- "Too Hot to Handle" (Super Friends), a 1973 episode
- "Too Hot to Handle" (The Super Mario Bros. Super Show!), a 1989 episode
- "Too Hot to Handle" (Teenage Mutant Ninja Turtles), a 1992 episode
