= Bugman =

Bugman may refer to:

- Ruud Kleinpaste (born 1952), known as "the Bugman" in New Zealand, notably on Maggie's Garden Show from 1992
- List of Donkey Kong characters (redirect from Stan the Bugman)
- Bugman, villain in Teenage Mutant Ninja Turtles (1987 TV series)
- Bugman, villain in COPS
- "Bugman", a song from the 1999 Blur album 13
- Bugman, a 2002 EP by the American band French Toast
- "Bugman", a derogatory term used by Bronze Age Pervert in his 2018 manifesto Bronze Age Mindset to refer to the subjects of late-modernity
