= Take Me to Your Leader =

Take Me to Your Leader may refer to:

- Take me to your leader (phrase), a cartoon catchphrase, said by extraterrestrial aliens

== Music ==
- Take Me to Your Leader (¡Mayday! album), 2012, or the title song
- Take Me to Your Leader (Hawkwind album), 2005
- Take Me to Your Leader (King Geedorah album), 2003, or the title song
- Take Me to Your Leader (Newsboys album), 1996, or the title song
- "Take Me to Your Leader" (Incubus song), 1996
- "Take Me to Your Leader", a 2008 song by British indie folk band The Conspirators
- "Take Me to Your Leader", a song by Add N to (X) from Loud Like Nature (2002)
- "Take Me to Your Leader", a song by Hanzel und Gretyl from Transmissions from Uranus (1997)
- "Take Me to Your Leader: 78-79 Demos", a Wall of Voodoo bootleg release
- "Take Me to Your Leader", a song by The Sinceros from The Sound of Sunbathing (1979)
- "Take Me to Your Leader", a song by Foreigner from Foreigner (1977), serving as a bonus track in the album's re-release
- "Take Me to Your Leader", a 1958 song by Jonathan Winters with Martians

== Television episodes ==
- "Take Me To Your Leader", a 1996 episode of Mighty Ducks: The Animated Series
- "Take Me to Your Leader", an episode of the 1987-1996 TV series Teenage Mutant Ninja Turtles
- "Take Me to Your Leader" (American Horror Story), an episode of the tenth season of American Horror Story
- "The Take Me to Your Leader Affair", the 16th episode in season 3 of The Man from U.N.C.L.E. (1966-67)
- "Take Me to Your Leader Raid", a 1967 episode of The Rat Patrol

== Other ==
- Take Me To Your Leader, a 2026 book by Neil deGrasse Tyson
