= Chrome Dome =

Chrome Dome may refer to:

- Chrome dome, a shining bald head
- Chrome Dome, a fictional character a.k.a. Mr. Cooper in Sweet Valley High novels
- Chrome Dome (Teenage Mutant Ninja Turtles), a fictional character debuting in season 5 of Teenage Mutant Ninja Turtles
- Chrome Dome Empire, a fictional organization in Cyber City setting for comics
- Chromedome (Transformers), a fictional character in the Transformers universe
- A nickname for either Cobra Commander or Destro in the G.I. Joe universe
- A nickname for Mr RH Allen legendary librarian of Dartford Boys Grammar School (now deceased)
  - Professor Chromedome, a mad scientist in The Tick comics
- Operation Chrome Dome, a U.S. Cold-War strategic-bomber program
