= The Gang's All Here =

The Gang's All Here may refer to:

== Film and TV ==
- The Gang's All Here (1939 film), a 1939 British film starring Jack Buchanan and Googie Withers
- The Gang's All Here (1941 film), a 1941 American film starring Frankie Darro, Marcia Mae Jones, and Jackie Moran
- The Gang's All Here (1943 film), a 1943 American film directed by Busby Berkeley and starring Alice Faye and Carmen Miranda
- "The Gang's All Here", a 1984 episode of the animated TV series Alvin and the Chipmunks
- "The Gang's All Here" (Pee-wee's Playhouse), a 1986 episode of the children's TV series Pee-wee's Playhouse
- "The Gang's All Here", an episode of the 1987 TV series Teenage Mutant Ninja Turtles

== Music ==
- The Gang's All Here (Dropkick Murphys album), 1999
- The Gang's All Here (Skid Row album), 2022
- "Hail, Hail, the Gang's All Here", a traditional song

== Books and plays ==
- The Gang's All Here (play), 1959 play by Jerome Lawrence and Robert Edwin Lee
- Hail, Hail, the Gang's All Here, a 1971 87th Precinct novel by Ed McBain
