= Turtles in Time (disambiguation) =

Turtles in Time may refer to:

- Teenage Mutant Ninja Turtles: Turtles in Time, an arcade video game produced by Konami
  - Teenage Mutant Ninja Turtles: Turtles in Time Re-Shelled, an enhanced remake of the 1991 arcade game
- Teenage Mutant Ninja Turtles III, of which "The Turtles are back... in time" was one of this movie's marketing slogans.
- "A Turtle in Time", a season 10 episode of the 1987 TV series Teenage Mutant Ninja Turtles
