= Teenage Mutant Ninja Turtles (1987 TV series) season 9 =

Teenage Mutant Ninja Turtles
- Season 9
- No. of episodes: 8

Release
- Original network: CBS (Kidz (Action Zone))
- Original release: September 16 – November 4, 1995

Season chronology
- ← Previous; Season 8 Next → Season 10

The ninth season of Teenage Mutant Ninja Turtles aired in 1995. After the Turtles' usual enemies, led by Shredder, are stuck in Dimension X, a new villain named Lord Dregg takes their place as the main villain of the series. The Technodrome is not seen in this season. This is also the last season with David Wise's input.

== Episodes ==
- All eight ninth-season episodes were directed by Tony Love.

No. overall	No. in season	Title	Written by	Original release date	TV broadcast
178	1	"The Unknown Ninja"	Mark Edens and Bob Forward	September 16, 1995	S09E01
A mysterious young man named Carter, who has been tracking the Turtles' movements, wishes to train under Master Splinter's guidance. Meanwhile, the Turtles race to stop Lord Dregg's plans for global domination. The turtles' mutations prove to have become unstable and an incident leads to Carter being mutated into a mutant yellow-skinned humanoid.
179	2	"Dregg of the Earth"	Mark Edens and David Wise	September 23, 1995	S09E02
The Turtles try to stop Dregg's Techno Gang from stealing a Proton Accelerator. Due to Carter's interference, the aliens get away. Lord Dregg needs the device to repair his Molecular Converter, but the Turtles need to expose Lord Dregg's true intentions.
180	3	"The Wrath of Medusa"	David Wise	September 30, 1995	S09E03
Lord Dregg hires an alien bounty hunter named Medusa to help capture the Turtles. The Turtles must fight off this new threat. Meanwhile, Carter realizes that he is more of a hindrance than a help.
181	4	"The New Mutation"	David Wise	October 7, 1995	S09E04
The Turtles set out to prove Lord Dregg's true motives, after nearly getting arrested by military police at Hyper Dyne Labs. The Techno Gang steal a substance called X-Fire, a highly explosive fuel. The Turtles are also still coming to grips with their unstable mutations. Meanwhile, an alien slug called a Slorr hatches and begins terrorizing the city.
182	5	"The Showdown"	David Wise	October 14, 1995	S09E05
Using a Hypno Transmitter, Lord Dregg is disrupting all the TV stations in the city with a hypnotic signal, which becomes permanent after 20 minutes. After the Turtles destroy his transmitter, Lord Dregg decides to replicate the Turtles' mutagen in order to make his Techno Gang invincible.
183	6	"Split-Second"	David Wise	October 21, 1995	S09E06
A new foe appears in the form of the time-obsessed Chronos who has thrown the city into chaos due to all clocks malfunctioning. Can the Turtles, April O'Neil, and Carter stop him before it is too late?
184	7	"Carter, the Enforcer"	David Wise	October 28, 1995	S09E07
Lord Dregg plans to build a Star Shield, a device that Lord Dregg claims will protect Earth from hostile alien invaders. Meanwhile, the Turtles, with the help of April & her mini-cam, hope to expose Lord Dregg for the fraud that he is. The Turtles also find out that Lord Dregg has built an android replica of Carter.
185	8	"Doomquest"	David Wise	November 4, 1995	S09E08
An interdimensional being called Doomquest and his minion Draconus comes to Earth from the Dark Realm to try to get a powerful crystal from Lord Dregg. The Turtles find that their unstable mutations are now starting to cause them to lose their intelligence whenever they mutate into their new forms. In the end, April is able to successfully expose Lord Dregg's true intentions to the world.: Final time Rob Paulsen voices Raphael prior to 1987 Raphael's guest appearance in the 2012 series.
