= Teenage Mutant Ninja Turtles (1987 TV series) season 2 =

Teenage Mutant Ninja Turtles
- Season 2
- No. of episodes: 13

Release
- Original network: Syndication
- Original release: October 1 – December 24, 1988

Season chronology
- ← Previous; Season 1 Next → Season 3

The second season of Teenage Mutant Ninja Turtles aired in syndication. For most of this season, the Technodrome is located in Dimension X and Shredder is without Krang's help.

== Episodes ==
- All thirteen second-season episodes were directed by Yoshikatsu Kasai (who was not credited in the credits of the English version) and Fred Wolf.

No. overall	No. in season	Title	Written by	Original release date	TV broadcast
6	1	"Return of the Shredder"	Story by : David Wise and Patti Howeth; Teleplay by : Christy Marx	October 1, 1988; January 3rd, 1990 (BBC One)	S02E01
Shredder returns from Dimension X. However, Krang says until Shredder proves himself trustworthy cause he failed to defeat the turtles and Splinter with Krang's technology, he will be denied the aid of his Foot Soldiers or Bebop and Rocksteady, who are still stuck in Dimension X. Shredder goes to a corrupt, sleazy karate school run by Smash (voiced by Peter Cullen) and teaches the students how to commit crimes while dressed as the Turtles in an attempt to discredit the real Turtles. Shredder also frees Baxter Stockman from the psychiatric hospital and tasks him with kidnapping Splinter. Notes: First Appearances of Irma and Tiffany. Vernon is now voiced by Peter Renaday.
7	2	"The Incredible Shrinking Turtles"	Larry Parr	October 8, 1988; January 10th, 1990 (BBC One)	S02E02
The turtles seek out the fragments of the Eye of Sarnoth, a crystal with unimaginable power. After finding the first fragment, Shredder steals it and uses it to shrink the turtles. Shredder also tries to convince Krang but Krang insists Shredder that he will only believe it if he brings the turtles on a plate for Krang. Now Splinter and April O'Neil must intervene. April is able to enlarge the Turtles, but our heroes lose in the end as Shredder escapes with the first fragment.
8	3	"It Came from Beneath the Sewers"	Larry Parr	October 15, 1988; January 17th, 1990 (BBC One)	S02E03
After discovering that a mutant plant has had its growth accelerated by the first fragment of the Eye of Sarnoth, Shredder unleashes it on the city to attack the Turtles. Meanwhile, April is lured into a trap by Shredder and is immediately captured. However, the Turtles disguise themselves as pizza delivery boys and free her, though Shredder escapes again with the fragment while the Turtles must destroy the mutant plant that is wreaking havoc on the city.
9	4	"The Mean Machines"	Michael Reaves	October 22, 1988; January 24th, 1990 (BBC One)	S02E04
Upon finding the second fragment of the Eye of Sarnoth, Shredder uses it as a power source for a supercomputer named Omnis, in the hopes of opening a portal to Dimension X. Meanwhile, the Turtles must deal with machines that suddenly go haywire all over the city.
10	5	"Curse of the Evil Eye"	Martin Pasko	October 29, 1988; January 31st, 1990 (BBC One)	S02E05
Shredder completes the Eye of Sarnoth, attaches it to his helmet, and plans to unleash its power on the world. However, when the Turtles intervene, the helmet falls into other hands.
11	6	"The Case of the Killer Pizzas"	Douglas Booth	November 5, 1988; February 7th, 1990 (BBC One)	S02E06
Krang sends the eggs of Xenomorph-like creatures, which look like meatballs, in order to assassinate the Turtles. Baxter Stockman then rigs a contest so that he and Shredder can deliver the deadly pizzas to the Turtles. However, due to heavy customer demands the Turtles end up getting ordinary pizzas, and the booby-trapped pizzas are out somewhere in New York! Shredder and Baxter may have ended up becoming victims of their own plots when the pizza monsters do not discriminate between ally and enemy.
12	7	"Enter: The Fly"	Michael Reaves and Brynne Stephens	November 12, 1988; February 14th, 1990 (BBC One)	S02E07
Tired of Baxter Stockman's constant failures, Shredder sends him to Dimension X in exchange for Krang sending Bebop and Rocksteady back to Earth as his henchmen. Unable to find any more use for Baxter, Krang tries to disintegrate him. However, a malfunction causes Baxter to instead cross-mutate into a house fly which followed Stockman into the disintegrator.: This episode was created as a tribute to the classic 1958 science-fiction horror film The Fly. Its 1986 remake film of the same name premiered one year before the series began.
13	8	"Invasion of the Punk Frogs"	Michael Reaves	November 19, 1988; February 21st, 1990 (BBC One)	S02E08
Shredder is running low on mutagen, so Krang sends a canister that ends up in the Everglades due to trans-dimensional problems. Shredder sees the mutagen canister broke, but did create four mutant frogs whom he befriends and gets to commit robberies, as well as to hate the Turtles. Donatello realizes Shredder is ordering robberies of chemicals in order to mass produce mutagen. The Turtles must not only face the misguided Frogs, but their job is complicated due to the NYPD now having an anti-Turtle task force.: First Appearances of the Punk Frogs (Attila the Frog, Genghis Frog, Rasputin the Mad Frog, and Napoleon Bonafrog).
14	9	"Splinter No More"	Michael Reaves and Brynne Stephens	November 26, 1988; February 28th, 1990 (BBC One)	S02E09
Donatello devises a cure to make Master Splinter human again. Meanwhile, Shredder plans to open a gate to Dimension X.
15	10	"New York's Shiniest"	Richard Merwin	December 3, 1988; March 7th, 1990 (BBC One)	S02E10
A robot cop named Rex-1 helps April and the Turtles defeat an evil army of robot cops under the control of Shredder.: First Appearance of Rex-1.
16	11	"Teenagers from Dimension X"	Michael Reaves	December 10, 1988; March 14th, 1990 (BBC One)	S02E11
The Neutrinos return to Earth after hearing in on the plan of Krang and Shredder to get rid of the turtles via brain-drain. Shredder finds interest in their Starmobile's ability to open dimension portals and tries to get his hands on it, and meanwhile the turtles try to get the Starmobile's main energy source running again.
17	12	"The Catwoman from Channel Six"	Richard Merwin	December 17, 1988; March 21st, 1990 (BBC One)	S02E12
A freak accident from a transporter turns April into a cat human. Irma meets TMNT in order to rescue her.
18	13	"Return of the Technodrome"	Michael Reaves	December 24, 1988; March 28th, 1990 (BBC One)	S02E13
While Splinter goes out on a retreat, the turtles must try to stop the Technodrome from returning to Earth.
