= Energie AG Oberösterreich =

Energie AG
- Type: AG
- Industry: Electricity; Natural gas; District heating; Telecommunication; Water supply; Waste disposal
- Founded: 1905; 121 years ago
- Headquarters: Böhmerwaldstraße 3; Linz, Austria, EU
- Key people: Energie AG Group; Leonhard Schitter (CEO); Eva Schinkinger (CFO); Alexander Kirchner (CTO)
- Revenue: ▼EUR 2.842 billion (2024)
- Operating income: ▼EUR 298.0 million (2024)
- Total assets: ▼EUR 3.781 billion (2024)
- Total equity: ▲EUR 2.098 billion (2024)
- Number of employees: 4900 (2024)
- Website: energieag.at

The Energie AG Oberösterreich (former Oberösterreichische Kraftwerke AG, abbreviated as OKA) is an energy and infrastructure provider headquartered in Linz. It provides electricity, natural gas, district heating, water, and waste disposal, as well as telecomminication using fibre networks and other technologies. Its area of operation is Austria, mainly the region of Upper Austria, Salzburg, Styria and Lower Austria, as well as northern Italy and southern Czech Republic. Since 2008, all corporate departments are located in the Power Tower close to Linz Mainstation.

== Former company names ==
- 1929–1941: Österreichische Kraftwerke AG (ÖKA) trans. Austrian Powerplant Corporation
- 1941–1945: Kraftwerke Oberdonau (KOA) trans. Powerplants Oberdonau.
- 1945–1947: Österreichische Kraftwerke AG (ÖKA) changed back after the war.
- 1947–1999: Oberösterreichische Kraftwerke AG (OKA) trans. Upper Austrian Powerplant Corporation

== History ==
=== Austrian Empire ===
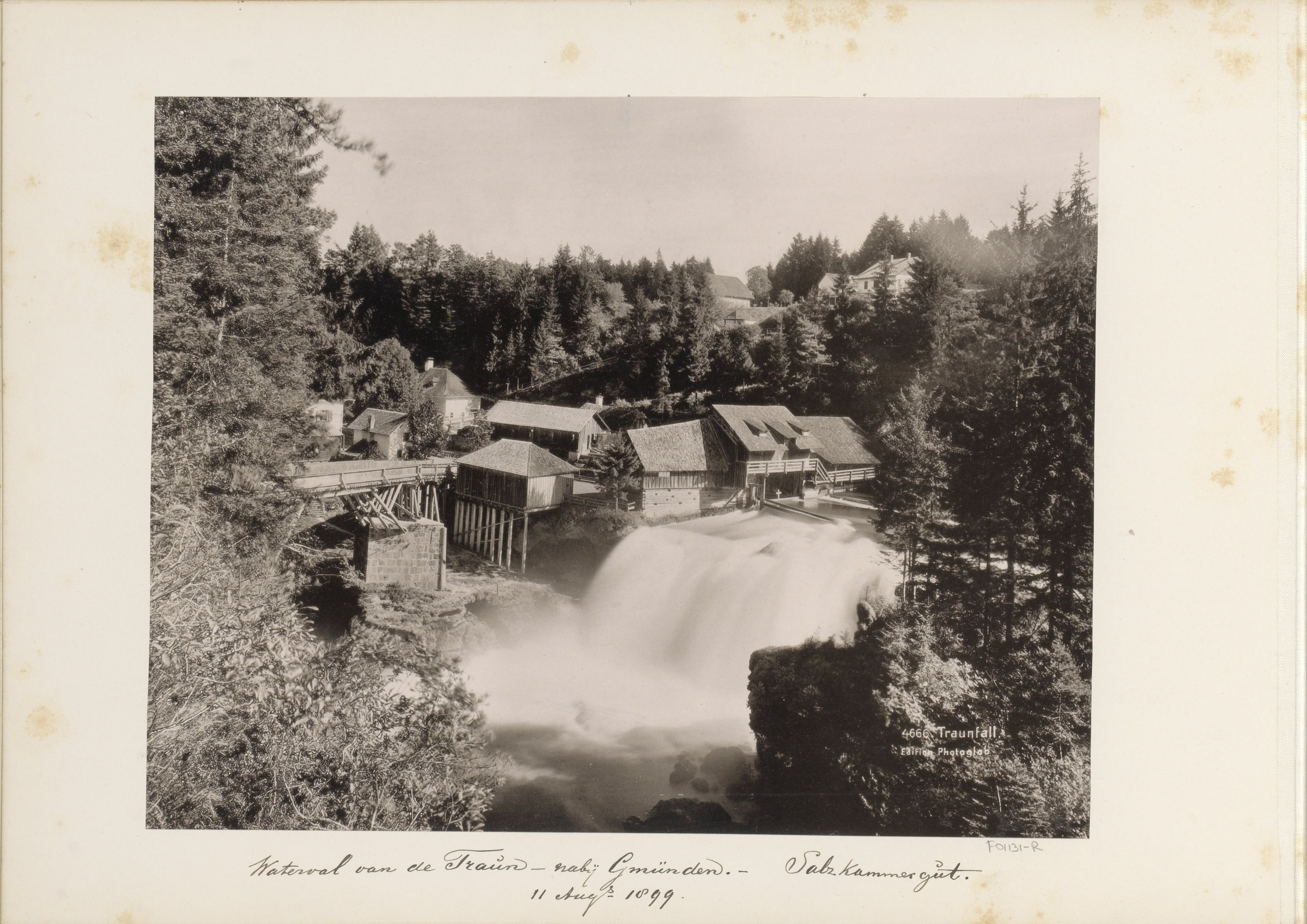
Traun river 1899 before the hydro electric power plant was built

In 1892 the planning of the first steam power plant in St. Wolfgang with 25 PS (18 kW) marked the beginning of public electricity production in the Salzkammergut region (Upper Austria, Salzburg and Styria).

About ten years later the transportation conglomerate Stern & Hafferl build the first large scale hydro power plant of Upper Austria, this being the Traunfall hydro electric plant. In 1905 Stern and Hafferl established the Elektrizitätswerke Stern & Hafferl AG abbr. EW (trans. Electrical Plants Stern and Hafferl Corp.) as a subsidiary, consolidating the power plant operations from their other railway subsidiaries. Four years later in 1909 the Upper Austrian state government decided that the state of Upper Austria should have a share in the EW.

=== First Republic ===
The end of the First World War and the following collapse of the Austro-Hungarian Empire in 1918 marked a fundamental reorientation of the Austrian energy sector. Later developments lead to the formation of the Oberösterreichische Wasserkraft- und Elektrizitäts-AG abbr. OWEAG (trans. Upper Austrian Hydropower and Electric Corp.) In 1924 construction of the first 110 kV line in Austria was started, linking the Pumped-storage hydroelectricity plant Partebstein to the central region of Linz and Steyr. Following long negotiations the Stern and Haffel owned EW and the later formed OWEAG merged, forming the Österreichische Kraftwerke AG abbr. ÖKA (trans. Austrian Powerplant Corporation). The new corporation owned 12 hydropower plants as well as two coal fired power plants generating a net output power of 85 MW supplying some 3,250 kilometres (2,020 mi) of distribution lines.

=== During nazi occupation ===
After nazi germany annexed austria in 1938 they started to ban Austrian national identity in fear of separatism. As a result of this the name Austria was not allowed to be used anymore and thus the name of the ÖKA (trans. Austrian Powerplant Corporation) was changed to KOA for Kraftwerke Oberdonau AG (trans. Powerplants Upper Danube Province). During the second world war electricity production was continued up to the very end of the war, only being interrupted by severe war damage to the power plants and later a drop in demand as the power grid dissolved under bombing of allied forces.

=== Developments following the Second World War ===
After the Second World War emergency measures were set into place to rebuild the power grid. 1947 the name was changed back to ÖKA, leaving this dark capital of history behind. Under the Second Nationalisation Act of 1947, ÖKA became the regional energy provider for the state of Upper Austria. The name was later changed to Oberösterreichische Kraftwerke AG abbr. OKA (trans. Upper Austrian Powerplant Corporation)

=== Time of economic recovery ===
In 1964 the new office building of the general management located at Böhmerwaldstreed in Linz was completed. Three years later the construction of the hydro plant Riedersbach was started, this being the largest ever single financial investment of the OKA up to this point.

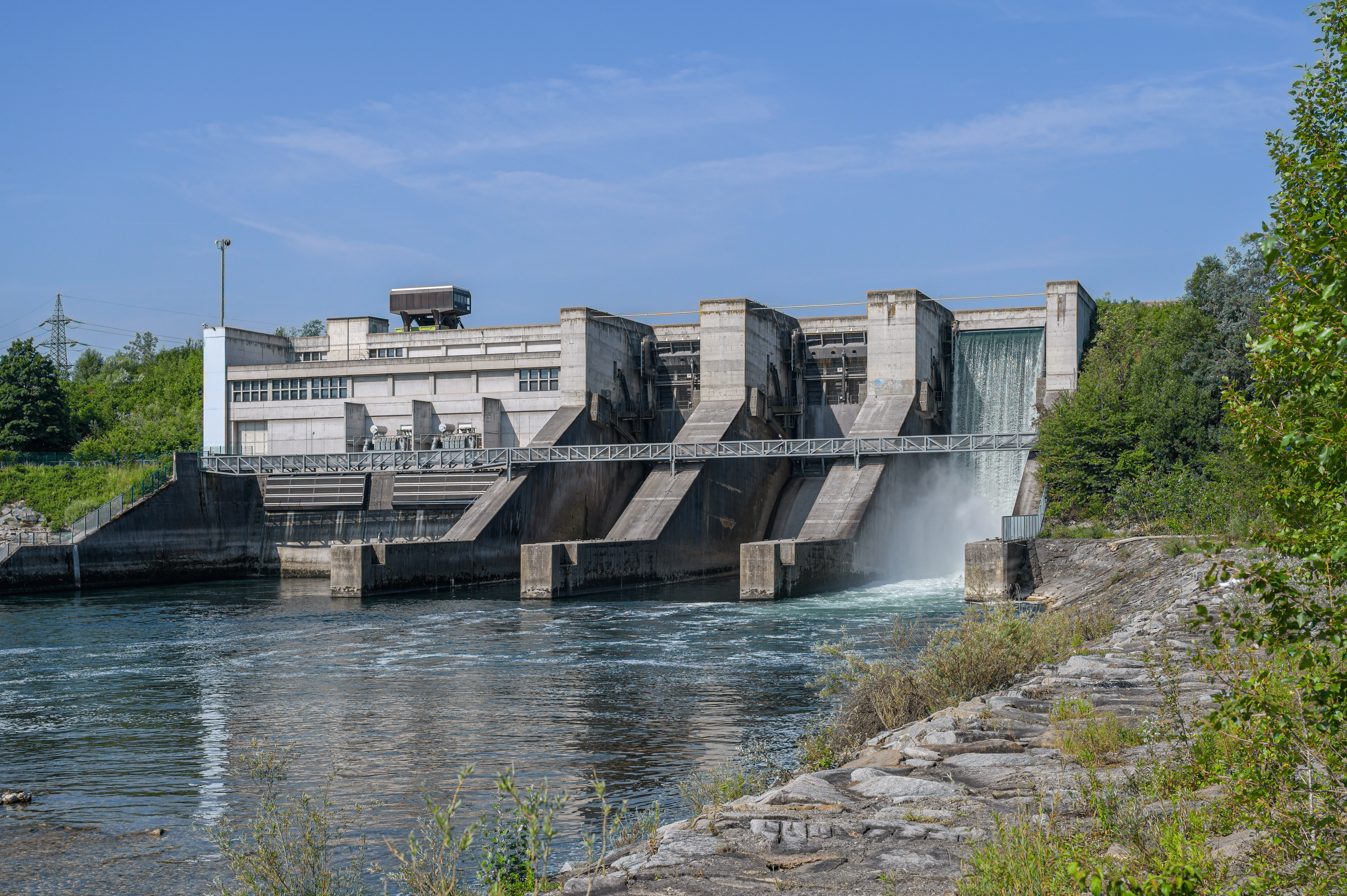
Traun-Pucking hyro power plant, operational since 1983

By acquiring parts of the Welser Abfallverwertungsgesellschaft m.b.H. abbr. WAV (trans. Welser Waste Recycling Company) in 1989 the OKA entered the business of waste and waste water disposal. In the same year OKA first synchronised the solar power plant Loser to the grid, marking the first use of solar power generation in its grid. 1991 marked the formation of the Abfall-, Verwertung-, Entsorgungsgesellschaft m.b.H. abbr. AVE (trans. Waste, Recycling and Disposal Company). Following major restructuring in 1999 the OKA was renamed to Enegie AG Oberösterreich (trans. Energy Corporation Upper Austria)

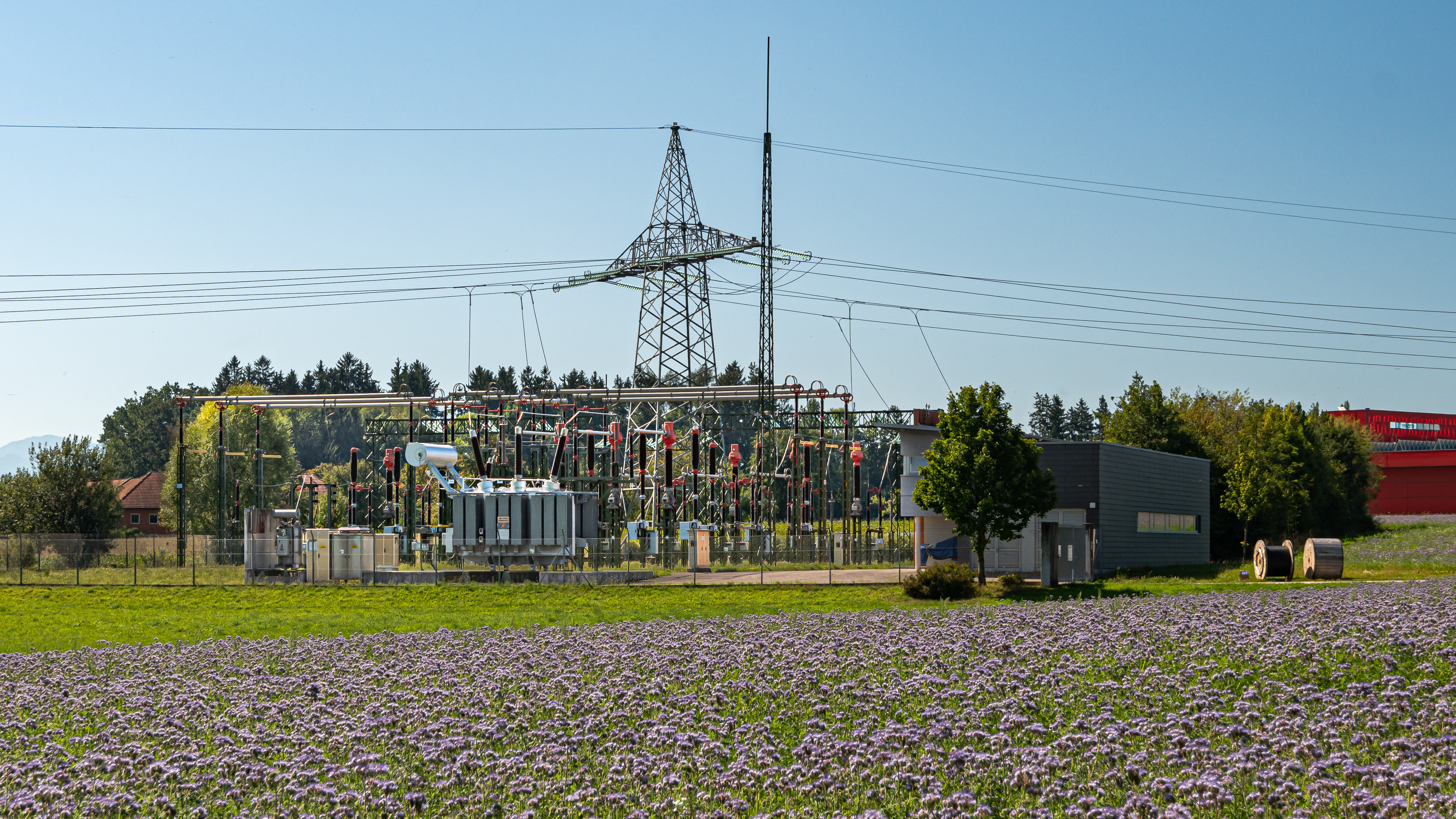
220/110/30 kV distribution substation

=== Developments since 2000 ===
Since 2000, the company has increasingly expanded into the waste management and water management sectors. Under pressure of the European Union, Austria had entered six prior, the electricity market of Austria was liberalised in 2001, also affecting the operations of Energie AG. In 2004 the Wärme Oberösterreich G.m.b.H. (trans.Thermal Upper Austria) was formed, consolidating the district heating operations from other branches of the group. A year later in 2005 approval was granted for the construction of the new 400 WM combined-cycle gas turbine power plant in Timelkam. The following year in 2006 Energie AG rose to be upper austria's largest infrastructure provider. The energy (electricity, heating and gas), waste management and water sectors became the company's main pillars. Its market areas now encompassed Austria, southern Germany, the Czech Republic, Hungary and the neighbouring Central European countries.

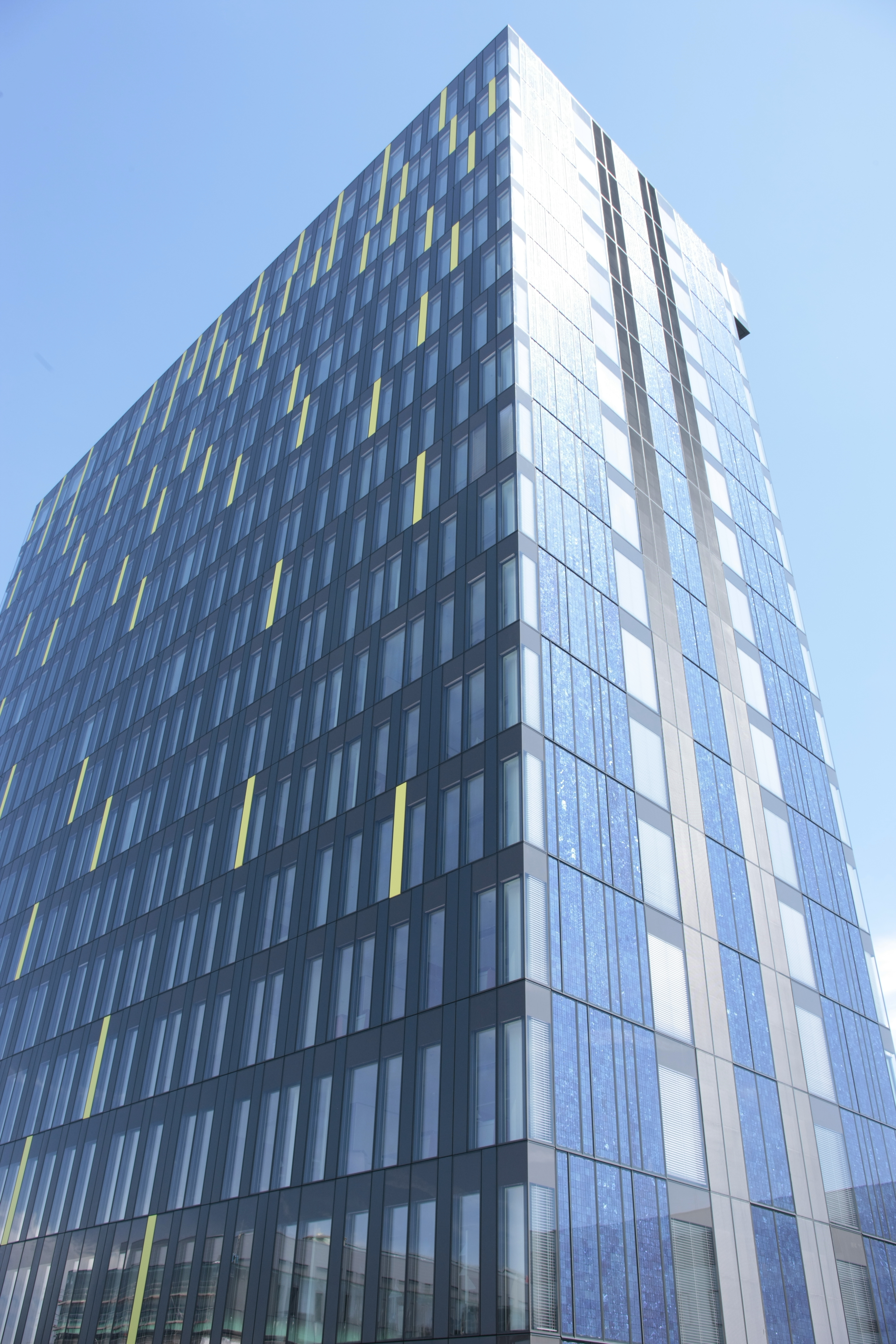
Company headquarters in Linz

In 2008, the group moved into its new headquarters, the Power Tower on Böhmerwaldstraße in Linz. In the same year, the 400 MW combined cycle gas turbine power plant in Timelkam was synchronized to the grid for the first time. The Group continued to grow with its entry into the Italian (waste management) and Slovenian (water) markets in 2009. In 2013, the waste management division’s operations in Eastern Europe were sold. In 2015, implementation of the Power Strategy 2020 began.

Leo Windtner, the group's longest-serving CEO, left the company in 2017 after 22 years in the role. His successor, Werner Steinecker, retired at the end of 2022. Leonhard Schitter has been serving as the group’s CEO since 1 January 2023.

=== Ownership structure ===
Since 19 December 2023

- OÖ Landesholding: 52.71 %
- Raiffeisenlandesbank OÖ: 13.98 %
- Linz AG: 10.36 %
- TIWAG: 8.28 %
- Verbund AG: 5.20 %
- Oberbank AG (Konsortium): 5.18 %
- voestalpine: 2.07 %
- OÖ Landesbank AG: 1.04 %
- Sparkasse Oberösterreich Bank AG: 0.52 %
- OÖ Versicherung AG: 0.52 %
- Land Oberösterreich: 0.10 %
- Energie AG Oberösterreich: 0.04 %

=== Investments ===
Energie AG holds stakes in several companies, including Ennskraftwerke AG (50 %), BBOÖ Breitband Oberösterreich GmbH (50 %), Wels Strom GmbH (49 %), and Salzburg AG (26.13 %).

=== Executive Board ===
- Leonhard Schitter, CEO
- Eva Schinkinger, CFO
- Alexander Kirchner, CTO

== Corporate structure ==
Energie AG is organised as a group. The holding company, which has been in existence since 2006, performs management and group-wide functions, whilst the business and service divisions are organised as subsidiaries.

=== Subsidiaries ===
- Energie AG Oberösterreich Bohemia GmbH
  Responsible for drinking water supply and wastewater disposal in the Czech Republic
- Energie AG Oberösterreich Erzeugung GmbH
  Responsible for the development, construction, operation and maintenance of electricity and heat generation plants
- Energie AG Oberösterreich Öko GmbH
  Supply of green electricity from photovoltaic, biomass, geothermal, solar and wind sources
- Energie AG Oberösterreich Personalmanagement GmbH
  Responsible for all HR tasks, including recruitment, training and professional development
- Energie AG Oberösterreich Services und Digital Solutions GmbH
  Customer Operations (customer communications, etc.), services in the fields of IT, telecommunications and data services
- Energie AG Oberösterreich Tech Services GmbH
  technical services for all grid-related facilities and power stations
- Energie AG Oberösterreich Trading GmbH
  Energy trading (electricity, gas, oil, CO₂ allowances) by the Group on European trading markets
- Energie AG Oberösterreich Vertrieb GmbH
  Provides support to customers in private households, agriculture, commerce and industry.
- Energie AG Oberösterreich Umwelt Service GmbH
  Waste management services (collection, sorting and recycling of waste), water and sewerage services
- Netz Oberösterreich GmbH
  builds and operates the electricity and natural gas networks across large parts of Upper Austria, as well as parts of Salzburg, Styria and, to a lesser extent, Lower Austria
- IfEA Institut für Energieausweis GmbH (subsidiary of Vertrieb GmbH)
  Specialist provider of energy-efficient and sustainable construction services, including the preparation of energy performance certificates
- WDL-WasserdienstleistungsGmbH (subsidiary of Umwelt Service GmbH)
  Provision and operation of water and wastewater systems

== Business divisions ==
- Energy (elecricity, natural gas, district heating, telecommunication)
- Waste disposal
- Water supply

=== Promotion of sport ===
Through the Energie AG Sports Association, the group supports top local athletes and up-and-coming talent, such as Andrea Limbacher and Michael Hayböck.
