= Power tower =

Power tower may refer to:

- Power Tower, a thrill ride at Valleyfair and Cedar Point amusement parks
- Power tower (power take-off), a type of mechanical power take-off
- Solar power tower, a type of solar power plant
- Tetration, a mathematical operation also known as power tower
- Transmission tower, usually a tall steel lattice tower supporting an electric power line.
- Power tower (exercise), a piece of exercise equipment
- Power tower (Linz), an office building in Linz, Austria
