= Teenage Mutant Ninja Turtles (1987 TV series) season 8 =

Teenage Mutant Ninja Turtles
- Season 8
- No. of episodes: 8

Release
- Original network: CBS (Toontastic (Action Zone))
- Original release: September 17 – November 5, 1994

Season chronology
- ← Previous; Season 7 Next → Season 9

The eighth season of Teenage Mutant Ninja Turtles aired in 1994. From this point onwards, the show was retooled into a more action-based series. Among the changes, the tone of the show became darker and more serious, the art style changed significantly, and many of the previous notable characters were written out. There was also a new title sequence which added in clips from the first live-action film and stills from the first four episodes of season 8, and a new version of the theme song. These final three seasons are known as the "Red Sky episodes" amongst fans, because the sky was constantly portrayed as red, instead of the usual blue, complementing the overall darker tone.

The Technodrome is now in Dimension X, while Krang, Shredder, Bebop and Rocksteady are stranded on Earth. In addition, the Turtles also contend with the mutant organization H.A.V.O.C. (short for Highly Advanced Variety of Creatures).

== Episodes ==
- All eight eighth-season episodes were directed by Tony Love and written by David Wise.

| No. overall | No. in season | Title | Original release date | TV broadcast |
|---|---|---|---|---|
| 170 | 1 | "Get Shredder!" | September 17, 1994 | S08E01 |
Shredder & Krang are still loose on Earth. Without the resources of the Technodrome, they plan to steal equipment from the abandoned Hall of Science from the 1964 World Fair. Krang's former weapons engineer Drakus, using the guise of Beserko, also shows up to cause trouble. Once Krang is captured by Drakus, Shredder is under the impression that the Turtles have Krang and demands Krang's return or he'll blow up Channel 6 with the Turtle's friends inside.: William E. Martin voices Shredder in this season and Season 10.
| 171 | 2 | "Wrath of the Rat King" | September 24, 1994 | S08E02 |
While Krang tries to re-acquire the Technodrome from Dimension X where it has been sucked into a black hole, Shredder tracks down the Rat King and makes an alliance with him in order to destroy the Turtles that involves a new mutagen to be used on his rats. Meanwhile, the destruction of the Channel 6 building has led Burne Thompson to wrongfully denounce the turtles as a complete menace at Channel 6's new location, which leads the turtles to realize that maybe their actions are hurting people more often rather than helping them.
| 172 | 3 | "State of Shock" | October 1, 1994 | S08E03 |
A band of ninjas led by a mysterious villain named Megavolt are stealing electronic equipment from power plants all over the city, and the Turtles are being blamed for the crimes. The Turtles must find a way to defeat Megavolt & clear their names before it is too late.: Final appearance of Irma
| 173 | 4 | "Cry H.A.V.O.C.!" | October 8, 1994 | S08E04 |
A mysterious organization of mutants calling itself Highly Advanced Variety Of Creatures (or H.A.V.O.C. for short) has surfaced in the city. The Turtles meet their leader Titanus and his underlings Amok (a mutant goat), Highbeam (a mutant firefly), Magma (a lava mutant), Overdrive (a mutant cheetah), Raptor (a mutant bird of prey of indeterminate species), and unnamed mutant ram mystic. Although their pro-mutant intentions seem good on the outside, what are their true motives? The Turtles must find out.
| 174 | 5 | "H.A.V.O.C. in the Streets!" | October 15, 1994 | S08E05 |
Titanus & his H.A.V.O.C. organization are back, and this time they are planning to build a Sky Platform so that they can retrieve a lost Flux Transformer from a military base. Titanus creates a new electrical mutant called Synapse that can control anything mechanical from a convict that was last seen in "Get Shredder". The Turtles must stop Titannus and his evil plans once and for all.
| 175 | 6 | "Enter: Krakus" | October 22, 1994 | S08E06 |
Still after the Flux Transformer, Titanus and his mutants track its unique electronic signals, in order to locate it & get it back. Meanwhile, the Turtles have their hands full when an enforcer named Krakus shows up. The Turtles must find out who Krakus is and whether he is friend or foe.
| 176 | 7 | "Cyber-Turtles" | October 29, 1994 | S08E07 |
Krang and Shredder steal the Astro-Viewer, a powerful telescope, before disabling a starfighter passing over Earth. Once aboard the starfighter, Shredder steals the Fire Star, a crystalline fragment with the power of 1000 suns which renders its possessor invincible. Krang needs it in order to rule the universe & to merge Earth with Dimension X. When the starfighter's crew don power cybernetic armor in order to begin a hunt for the Fire Star, the Turtles use a set of armor for themselves to stop both the crew and Shredder.
| 177 | 8 | "Turtle Trek" | November 5, 1994 | S08E08 |
Krang and Shredder are using the city's power to operate Krang's new Transdimensional Portal to Dimension X, so that they finally has access to their Rock Soldier armies & resources. The Turtles rescue a resident of Dimension X named Gargon held captive by Krang on Earth. He agrees to help track down Shredder & Krang. Note: This episode's title is a reference to Star Trek.
