= Teenage Mutant Ninja Turtles (1987 TV series) season 3 =

Teenage Mutant Ninja Turtles
- Season 3
- No. of episodes: 47

Release
- Original network: Syndication
- Original release: September 25 – December 15, 1989

Season chronology
- ← Previous; Season 2 Next → Season 4

The third season of Teenage Mutant Ninja Turtles aired in syndication. For most of this season, the Technodrome is located at the Earth's core. Transport modules with drills are used to travel between the Technodrome and the Earth's surface.

== Episodes ==
No. overall	No. in season	Title	Directed by	Written by	Original release date	TV broadcast
19	1	"Beneath These Streets"	Bill Wolf	Michael Reaves	September 25, 1989; April 4th, 1990 (BBC One)	S03E01
The Turtles learn the cost of slacking off when Splinter is badly hurt during a confrontation with Shredder.
20	2	"Turtles on Trial"	Bill Wolf	Michael Reaves	September 26, 1989; April 11th, 1990 (BBC One)	S03E07
The intentions of the Turtles are put to the test when a controversial TV figure portrays our heroes as menaces to society. The Turtles forego publicly clearing their name to defeat Krang and his new robotic weapon.: First appearance of Krang's "bubble walker"
21	3	"Attack of the 50-Foot Irma"	Bill Wolf	Rowby Goren	September 27, 1989; April 18th, 1990 (BBC One)	S03E08
Irma accidentally becomes gigantic during an experiment to make Shredder giant-sized and her naturally clumsy nature makes her a danger to the city. The Turtles and April O'Neil hide her and search for her cure. Title Reference: Attack of the 50 Foot Woman.
22	4	"The Maltese Hamster"	Bill Wolf	David Wise	September 28, 1989; April 25th, 1990 (BBC One)	S03E09
Gangsters are swiping all the antiques in town. And when they swipe most of our heroes, it's up to Donatello and April to find out why. Could Shredder be behind this? Title Reference: The Maltese Falcon: In this episode, Burne Thompson is voiced by Townsend Coleman instead of Pat Fraley.
23	5	"Sky Turtles"	Bill Wolf	Reed Shelly and Bruce Shelly	September 29, 1989; May 2nd, 1990 (BBC One)	S03E03
The Turtles go flying when the Shredder invents a gravity-altering device. Soon it extends to the surface and affects all of New York City.
24	6	"The Old Switcheroo"	Bill Wolf	Michael Reaves	October 2, 1989; May 9th, 1990 (BBC One)	S03E06
The bodies of Shredder and Splinter are switched when a device is accidentally activated during a battle between the Turtles and their enemies. As Shredder plans the Turtles' demise and Splinter plans on how to get back to his body, everyone else is clueless
25	7	"Burne's Blues"	Bill Wolf	Story by : Bill Wolf; Teleplay by : Gordon Bressack	October 3, 1989; May 16th, 1990 (BBC One)	S03E17
In the middle of a summer heat wave, someone is destroying all the air conditioners and taking all the city's freon. The Turtles discover that Shredder is behind this as part of his latest plot to freeze New York. In the meantime, Vernon and Burne go looking for the Turtles, but find something else.: First appearance of Don Turtelli
26	8	"The Fifth Turtle"	Bill Wolf	Francis Moss	October 4, 1989; May 23rd, 1990 (BBC One)	S03E10
A 13-year-old boy tries his best to help out the Turtles, but with some not so optimal results. In the end, he proves himself to be a great asset to the Turtle team when dealing with Shredder.: First appearance of Zach and his brother Walt.
27	9	"Enter the Rat King"	Bill Wolf	Buzz Dixon	October 5, 1989; May 30th, 1990 (BBC One)	S03E15
A mysterious, sewer-dwelling man has an unnatural ability to put rats under his control. Can Splinter resist, or will he destroy the Turtles at the bidding of the Rat King? Notes: This is the very first episode not to feature Shredder. First appearance of the Rat King. In this episode, Burne Thompson is voiced by Townsend Coleman instead of Pat Fraley.
28	10	"Turtles at the Earth's Core"	Bill Wolf	Michael Reaves	October 6, 1989; June 5th, 1990 (BBC One)	S03E16
After witnessing a living Diplodocus wander in the city and disappear abruptly, the Turtles follow its tracks into a large hole, where they discover a shocking revelation: A cave where dinosaurs still roam. Meanwhile, Shredder and his mutant goons Bebop and Rocksteady are also there, but to collect a crystal needed by Krang to recharge the power cells of the Technodrome. The Turtles discover that the crystal is the source for all lifeforms inside the cave and must get it back before they are all destroyed. Title Reference: Tarzan at the Earth's Core
29	11	"April Fool" A.K.A. "April Foolish"	Reg Lodge	Michael Reaves and Brynne Stephens	October 9, 1989; June 12th, 1990 (BBC One)	S03E02
Emperor Aleister of Malicuria comes to the United States with a sample of Lydium 90, which gets noticed by Krang as a way to power up the Technodrome, which has constant brownouts. To celebrate relations between Malicuria and the US, Emperor Aleister hosts a masquerade ball in New York, but his bored daughter/April's exact double Princess Mallory sneaks out for a night on the town. April crashes the party dressed as a princess, and gets mistaken for Mallory, but the masquerade is also crashed by Shredder, Bebop, and Rocksteady who plans to kidnap Mallory in order to get the Lydium 90 shard.: This episode is inspired by Mark Twain's The Prince and the Pauper.
30	12	"Attack of Big MACC"	Bill Wolf	Francis Moss	October 10, 1989; June 19th, 1990 (BBC One)	S03E23
A robot warrior, known as the Mobile Armored Computerized Combatant (M.A.C.C.), arrives from 400 years in the future in 20th-Century New York. He befriends the Turtles, but Shredder and Krang are looking to bring him to their side at any means necessary.: Ace Duck is briefly seen on the Turtles' television, making his only appearance in the series.
31	13	"The Ninja Sword of Nowhere"	Bill Wolf	Michael Edens and Mark Edens	October 11, 1989; June 26th, 1990 (BBC One)	S03E12
Shredder gains possession of an ancient ninja sword that is crafted from an alien metal, allowing it to 'cut' through dimensions.: In this episode, Raphael is voiced by Thom Pinto instead of Rob Paulsen.
32	14	"20,000 Leaks Under the City"	Bill Wolf	Bob Schooley and Mark McCorkle	October 12, 1989	S03E18
Krang and Shredder's plan to flush out the Turtles from the sewers leaves the city flooded with water and creatures from the Atlantic Ocean. Title Reference: Twenty Thousand Leagues Under the Seas Notes: Final Appearance of Tiffany. In this episode, both Donatello and Bebop are voiced by Greg Berg instead of Barry Gordon.
33	15	"Take Me to Your Leader"	Bill Wolf	David Wise	October 13, 1989	S03E14
Worried that Shredder will soon win, Leonardo takes some time off, doubting his leadership. Meanwhile, Krang and Shredder drain solar energy from the Sun for the dual purpose of powering the Technodrome and capitulating Earth into another Ice Age. Without Leonardo, the three other Turtles try to thwart Shredder while taking turns as leader, but each realizes they need to overcome their own flaws, such as Raphael sticking to a decision, Michaelangelo becoming more serious, and Donatello needing to analyze even the most obvious facts. Title reference: Take Me to Your Leader
34	16	"Four Musketurtles"	Bill Wolf	Doug Molitor	October 16, 1989	S03E32
A bump on the head leaves Leonardo thinking that he is in 17th century France and that he and his comrades are Musketeers. Title Reference: The Three Musketeers Notes: In this episode, both Donatello and Bebop are voiced by Greg Berg instead of Barry Gordon. This episode was part of the TV Teddy video range where the titular teddy bear interacted with scenes and the presenter of the video.
35	17	"Turtles, Turtles, Everywhere"	Bill Wolf	David Bennett Carren and J. Larry Carroll	October 17, 1989	S03E29
Shredder programs the city's new garbage collecting super-computer to collect the Turtles. But when Shredder doesn't specify 'Ninja' Turtles, the super-computer collects them all! Turtles of the city of every shape and size are not safe.
36	18	"Cowabunga Shredhead"	Bill Wolf	Duane Capizzi and Steve Roberts	October 18, 1989	S03E04
Shredder thinks he's Michaelangelo after a computer malfunction.: In this episode, Krang is voiced by Townsend Coleman instead of Pat Fraley.
37	19	"Invasion of the Turtle Snatchers"	Bill Wolf	Francis Moss	October 19, 1989	S03E05
Aliens called Antarians abduct Donatello and Rocksteady. Title Reference: Invasion of the Body Snatchers
38	20	"Camera Bugged"	Bill Wolf	Michael Edens and Mark Edens	October 20, 1989	S03E11
A visit to Earth from a Polarisoid named Frip results in havoc when Shredder (and later, April O'Neil) comes into possession of the alien's camera, because it does more than just take pictures.: First appearance of Frip the Polarisoid.
39	21	"Green with Jealousy"	Bill Wolf	Reed Shelly and Bruce Shelly	October 23, 1989	S03E13
Shredder and Krang engineer a love potion that makes Leonardo, Michaelangelo, and Raphael all fall in love with Irma. Donatello races for an antidote before Shredder drains a naval nuclear submarine of all its power and things get crazy when Rocksteady takes a dose of the potion and falls in love with April.: In this episode, both Krang and Burne Thompson are voiced by Townsend Coleman instead of Pat Fraley.
40	22	"Return of the Fly"	Bill Wolf	Michael Reaves	October 24, 1989	S03E30
As the Turtles attempt to stop Shredder's plan to siphon water from an underground reservoir, Baxter Stockman returns for revenge on the Turtles and the Shredder. Title reference: Return of the Fly: In this episode, both Donatello and Bebop are voiced by Greg Berg instead of Barry Gordon.
41	23	"Casey Jones: Outlaw Hero"	Bill Wolf	David Wise	October 25, 1989	S03E27
An eager vigilante named Casey Jones is causing a stir in the city, while Krang and Shredder take control of all the machines in the city. Maybe this new 'hero' can help the Turtles. Notes: First appearance of Casey Jones. First episode not to feature Master Splinter.
42	24	"Mutagen Monster"	Bill Wolf	Michael Edens and Mark Edens	October 26, 1989	S03E26
A train accident produces gallons of mutagen that drench nearby cattle. The result is a super bull with a temper!: In this episode, both Donatello and Bebop are voiced by Greg Berg instead of Barry Gordon.
43	25	"Corporate Raiders from Dimension X"	Bill Wolf	David Wise	October 27, 1989	S03E35
White-collar criminals operating Octopus Incorporation and led by Octavius Ogilvy give new meaning to the term 'hostile take-over.' Casey Jones helps the Turtles uncover who's behind a new wave of corporate crime....Shredder.
44	26	"Pizza by the Shred"	Reg Lodge	Michael Edens and Mark Edens	October 30, 1989	S03E39
Michaelangelo gets a job as a pizza delivery boy. But who's his new boss?
45	27	"Super Bebop & Mighty Rocksteady"	Bill Wolf	David Carren and Larry Carroll	October 31, 1989	S03E21
Having had it with Bebop and Rocksteady's incompetence, Shredder and Krang use their technology to create robot duplicates of them, who are stronger and more intelligent, to keep the Turtles busy while they install a damaged mind-controlling Mesmerizer at the top of the broadcast tower at the Channel 6 building.
46	28	"Beware the Lotus"	Bill Wolf	Doug Molitor	November 1, 1989	S03E19
A skilled, and lovely, ninja warrior named Lotus is hired by Krang to defeat the Turtles. With Shredder replaced, Leonardo's met his match.: First appearance of Lotus.
47	29	"Blast from the Past"	Reg Lodge	David Wise	November 2, 1989	S03E22
Splinter suffers amnesia as the Turtles try to remind him that he is the true leader of the Foot Clan by reminiscing on their earliest adventures. Notes: This episode is mainly a clip show. Final episode where Krang is voiced by Townsend Coleman instead of Pat Fraley.
48	30	"Leatherhead: Terror of the Swamp"	Bill Wolf	Michael Reaves	November 3, 1989	S03E20
The Turtles' old friends the Punk Frogs are being terrorized by a mutant American alligator named Leatherhead in the Florida Everglades. Leatherhead teams up with Shredder to battle the Frogs and the Turtles. Notes: First appearance of Leatherhead. In this episode, both Donatello and Bebop are voiced by Greg Berg instead of Barry Gordon. In this episode, Shredder is voiced by Dorian Harewood instead of James Avery.
49	31	"Michaelangelo's Birthday"	Reg Lodge	Story by : Bill Wolf; Teleplay by : Eliot Daro	November 6, 1989	S03E28
It's Michaelangelo's birthday, but none of his older brothers seem to remember and it frustrates him greatly. Meanwhile, Shredder and Krang discover what is possibly an "anti-mutagen" that can undo mutations after testing it on three Rock Soldiers. Shredder, Bebop and Rocksteady are sent to use it on the Turtles and the Turtles have a few close calls.
50	32	"Usagi Yojimbo"	Bill Wolf	David Wise	November 7, 1989	S03E33
A rabbit ronin from an alternate dimension named Usagi Yojimbo is lost in our world. While the Turtles help him adjust, Shredder steals a dragon egg to unleash it on the city. Usagi's unwavering sense of bushido helps save the day.: First appearance of Usagi Yojimbo.
51	33	"Case of the Hot Kimono"	Bill Wolf	David Bennett Carren, J. Larry Carroll	November 8, 1989	S03E38
Someone is stealing all the kimonos in the city. After Master Splinter's favorite kimono is stolen, April's famous detective aunt Agatha Marbles helps the Turtles retrieve it.: First appearance of Agatha Marbles.; Second Episode without Shredder and Krang as the main villains.
52	34	"Usagi Come Home"	Bill Wolf	David Wise	November 9, 1989	S03E36
Shredder tricks Usagi Yojimbo into battling the Turtles. Title Reference: Lassie Come Home.: Final Appearance of Usagi Yojimbo.
53	35	"The Making of Metalhead"	Bill Wolf	Michael Reaves	November 10, 1989	S03E31
Even a case of Turtle Pox cannot stop our heroes from an attempt to take down Shredder and Krang after they unleash Metalhead, a robotic fighting machine programmed to seek and capture the Turtles. Notes: In this episode, Shredder is voiced by Dorian Harewood instead of James Avery. First appearance of Metalhead.
54	36	"Leatherhead Meets the Rat King"	Bill Wolf	David Wise	November 13, 1989	S03E37
Leatherhead arrives in New York seeking revenge for his defeat only to run into the Rat King who captures him and reveals his plans for world domination. The two villains end up arguing, then finally fighting each other instead of the Turtles.: Third episode without Shredder and Krang as the main villains.
55	37	"The Turtle Terminator"	Reg Lodge	David Bennett Carren and J. Larry Carroll	November 14, 1989	S03E24
Irma is kidnapped by Bebop and Rocksteady and is replaced by a robot that looks just like her that is programmed to eliminate the turtles. Things seem a bit wrong as whenever the word "turtle" is said, it instantly "zaps" whatever causes the word to be said with a laser. Meanwhile, the turtles try to rescue Irma from the Shredder's clutches. Notes: Final episode where Raphael is voiced by Thom Pinto instead of Rob Paulsen. In this episode, both Donatello and Bebop are voiced by Greg Berg instead of Barry Gordon.
56	38	"The Great Boldini"	Bill Wolf	Francis Moss	November 15, 1989	S03E43
The Turtles must clear their names when they are believed to be jewel thieves who stole a priceless emerald during a magic act run by a stage illusionist named Boldini.: Final Appearance of Don Turtelli.
57	39	"The Missing Map"	Bill Wolf	David Wise	November 16, 1989	S03E42
Zach's big brother, Walt, steals a rare pouch containing the only map to the Turtles' lair.
58	40	"The Gang's All Here"	Bill Wolf	James A. Davis	November 17, 1989	S03E41
Bebop and Rocksteady put on an act to get the Turtles to eat cookies, but not any ordinary cookies, because these cookies could turn them into humans! Tempted to find out what being a human is like, Michaelangelo eats one and becomes one. While the effects wears off from time to time, they still kick back in. Meanwhile, the Turtles search for Michaelangelo with an antidote for the anti-mutagen before it destroys him, while Shredder's two mutant goons ask for help from their old gang led by Lugnut to rob a ship. And during it all, April attempts to "join" the gang to get a story for Burne. Title Reference: Hail, Hail, the Gang's All Here
59	41	"The Grybyx"	Reg Lodge	Michael Reaves	November 20, 1989	S03E25
Kala's pet Grybyx, which has a really bad temper whenever it gets hungry, escapes from Dimension X through a portal to Earth, causing trouble for the Turtles.
60	42	"Mister Ogg Goes to Town"	Bill Wolf	David Wise	December 15, 1989	S03E44
An impish alien comedian from Dimension Z (who has mannerisms similar to Pee-wee Herman) escapes to Earth to cause big trouble for the TMNT.
61	43	"Shredderville"	Bill Wolf	Francis Moss	November 22, 1989	S03E34
The Turtles enter an alternate universe in which they dreamed that they never existed and where Shredder rules the city as Shredderville, April and Irma are slaves to a human Bebop and Rocksteady, Rock Soldiers patrol the streets, Krang is powerless without his body, and the Technodrome is on the verge of exploding. Notes: In this episode, Shredder is voiced by Dorian Harewood instead of James Avery. Loosely based on the movie It's a Wonderful Life
62	44	"Bye, Bye, Fly"	Bill Wolf	David Wise	November 23, 1989	S03E40
An interdimensional alien spacecraft leads Baxter Stockman to his latest vengeful plot to destroy the Turtles and Shredder. Notes: First appearance of the spaceship computer that is nicknamed Z. Final episode where Shredder is voiced by Dorian Harewood instead of James Avery.
63	45	"The Big Rip Off"	Bill Wolf	Michael Reaves	November 24, 1989	S03E45
After several failed attempts to get the Technodrome re-energized, Shredder and Krang run one last-ditch distraction for the Turtles at Fort Charles while Bebop and Rocksteady steal energy fuel cells from the neighboring space research center.
64	46	"The Big Break In"	Bill Wolf	David Wise	November 27, 1989	S03E46
The Technodrome is up and running again, and it is up to the Turtles to hinder Shredder and Krang from getting to the surface.
65	47	"The Big Blow Out"	Bill Wolf	David Wise	November 28, 1989	S03E47
After several setbacks, including firing a missile towards the Turtles out at the South Dakota countryside, missing and instead blowing up Mount Rushmore, Shredder and Krang steal all of New York's electricity and charge it into a giant transdimensional gateway, designed to send Earth into Dimension X. The Turtles must defeat their enemies once and for all before Earth is destroyed by Krang's Rock Soldier army. At the end, the turtles send the Technodrome to Dimension X and are celebrated as the heroes in town.
