= Teenage Mutant Ninja Turtles (1987 TV series) season 7 =

Teenage Mutant Ninja Turtles
- Season 7
- No. of episodes: 27

Release
- Original network: CBS and USA Network (Cartoon Express)
- Original release: September 18 – October 30, 1993

Season chronology
- ← Previous; Season 6 Next → Season 8

The seventh season of Teenage Mutant Ninja Turtles, titled Teenage Mutant Ninja Turtles: Vacation in Europe, chronologically begins where Episode 142 left off. The Technodrome is still located at the bottom of the Arctic Ocean until the last episode, when it is sent back to Dimension X for the third and final time. However the sideseason takes place during season 4, while the Technodrome is on the Volcanic Asteroid in Dimension X. These episodes were produced before Season 4 and aired in 1993 on the USA Cartoon Express. In Ireland, they aired in 1990 placed between seasons 4 and 5.

The more educational-based nature of the "Vacation in Europe" episodes allowed the use of Christian references. For example, Leonardo da Vinci's painting The Last Supper is seen in "Artless", set in Italy, while "Ring of Fire", set in Portugal, shows a Roman Catholic cathedral, complete with crosses, while crosses in general are avoided in the codes of US children's cartoons otherwise.

== Episodes ==
No. overall	No. in season	Title	Directed by	Written by	Original release date	Prod. code
143	1	"Tower of Power"	Bruno-Rene Huchez	Michael Malach	1993	9059-051
After winning a free European vacation, the Turtles journey to Paris, France. Meanwhile, Shredder, Rocksteady and Bebop are planning to steal metal from the Eiffel Tower on Bastille Day in order to power up the Technodrome.
144	2	"Rust Never Sleeps"	Bruno-Rene Huchez	Lee Schneider and Matthew Malach	1993	9059-052
Still in Paris, the Turtles and Master Splinter visit The Louvre. Meanwhile, due to Shredder's incompetence, Krang's new Hyper Rocket Thruster becomes a Rust Encruster with which he plans to oxidize the world's most famous landmarks and monuments unless world leaders use their power reserves to bring the Technodrome back to Earth.
145	3	"A Real Snow Job"	Bruno-Rene Huchez	Misty Taggart	1993	9059-053
In the Austrian Alps, Krang plans to use his new invention to melt the Alpine glaciers, flooding the low-lying villages.
146	4	"Venice on the Half Shell"	Bruno-Rene Huchez	Misty Taggart	1993	9059-054
The Turtles take a tour of Venice, Italy, just in time for the annual Mardi Gras festival which April O'Neil is covering for Channel 6. Meanwhile, Shredder and Krang plan to hold the priceless treasures of Venice to ransom by using Krang's HydroFluxor to flood the city.
147	5	"Artless"	Bruno-Rene Huchez	Doug Molitor	1993	9059-055
Two intergalactic art collectors named Dob and Yikum are stealing the priceless artworks from the museums of Florence, Italy. The aliens are taking only artworks designed by the Renaissance masters that the Turtles are named after.
148	6	"Night of the Dark Turtle"	Bill Hutten and Tony Love	David Wise	September 18, 1993	9062-9304
After a fight with Shredder causes Donatello to be struck by a laser beam, his personality changes to become a costumed superhero known as the Dark Turtle. His mission: Seek out and destroy Shredder. Meanwhile, a spaceship containing members of a Triceratops-like alien race called Triceratons who are led by Captain Zorax and Zork invades Earth.
149	7	"Ring of Fire"	Bruno-Rene Huchez	Michael Edens	1993	9059-059
The Turtles and Splinter arrive in Lisbon, Portugal just in time for the annual Running of the Bulls. Meanwhile, Shredder, Rocksteady, and Bebop will use Krang's new heat ray magnifier to burn the city to ashes using the power of the Sun unless the Turtles can stop them.: Greg Berg voices Donatello and Bebop in this episode, instead of Barry Gordon.
150	8	"The Irish Jig Is Up"	Bruno-Rene Huchez	Story by : Carole Mendelsohn; Teleplay by : John Fox	1993	9059-057
The Turtles and Splinter journey to Dublin, capital of the Republic of Ireland, land of myth and legend. Meanwhile, Shredder, Rocksteady, and Bebop use Krang's Rainbow TransCharmer to transform all of the cute furry animals in Dublin into vicious beasts.
151	9	"Shredder's New Sword"	Bruno-Rene Huchez	Francis Moss and Ted Pedersen	1993	9059-058
In London, England, Shredder takes possession of the mythic sword Excalibur and proclaims himself "King Shredder". The Turtles, along with Merlin, must take it from him or else the Medieval period will merge with the modern world.
152	10	"The Lost Queen of Atlantis"	Bruno-Rene Huchez	Michael Edens	1993	9059-056
The Turtles and Master Splinter travel to Athens, Greece while April and Irma buy a mysterious amulet from a flea market vendor. Unfortunately, Krang and Shredder have tracked enormous power readings straight to April's necklace, which is slowly transforming her into the Queen of the mythical underwater city of Atlantis.
153	11	"Turtles on the Orient Express"	Bruno-Rene Huchez	Doug Molitor	1993	9059-060
The Turtles take a trip on the famous Orient Express that runs from Gare de Lyon in Paris, France to Istanbul, Turkey. But Shredder is also on board and is planning to use Krang's new Super Charger to launch the Orient Express into the world's largest oil field.
154	12	"The Starchild"	Bill Hutten and Tony Love	David Wise	September 18, 1993	9062-9302
A small alien being named Quirx crash-lands on Earth, with intergalactic stormtroopers in hot pursuit. The Turtles must figure out how to get Quirx back to his home planet before Earth is destroyed.
155	13	"April Gets in Dutch"	Bruno-Rene Huchez	Misty Taggart	1993	9059-061
In Amsterdam, Netherlands, the Turtles must stop Shredder from stealing the Duchess Diamond, that Krang needs to power his Laser Dimension Blade. Shredder has some competition though, as two bumbling thieves also want the diamond for themselves.
156	14	"Northern Lights Out"	Bruno-Rene Huchez	Ted Pedersen and Francis Moss	1993	9059-062
While April is covering the Alternative Energy Convention in Oslo, Norway, the Turtles must track down modern-day vikings led by Erik the Red Eye: Alleged Son of Thor after they steal Professor Sven Svenson's scientific notes.
157	15	"Elementary, My Dear Turtle"	Bruno-Rene Huchez	Dennis O'Flaherty	1993	9059-063
After experiencing a time-slip with an atomic clock in the City of Westminster, the Turtles find themselves in 1890, where they meet the famous detective Sherlock Holmes and his assistant, Dr. Watson, hot on the trail of Professor Moriarty who has stolen the atomic clock with intentions to rule the future. The Turtles must retrieve the atomic clock before Moriarty uses it to change history and proclaim himself Emperor of the World.
158	16	"The Legend of Koji"	Bill Hutten and Tony Love	David Wise	September 25, 1993	9062-9303
Shredder uses a time machine to travel back to Ancient Japan in the year 1583. He plans to defeat Hamato Koji, the man who founded the Foot Clan and Splinter's great ancestor. If Hamato Koji were to be defeated, then Master Splinter would never have been born and the Turtles would forever remain ordinary turtles.: This is the first episode to not feature April O'Neil.
159	17	"Convicts from Dimension X"	Bill Hutten and Tony Love	Jack Mendelsohn	September 25, 1993	9062-9301
Two convicts from Dimension X named Scarrg and Dementor are brought to Earth when Donatello's Portable Portal Generator malfunctions. Unfortunately, Vernon and Irma are transported to the Dimension X Penitentiary in their place. The Turtles must defeat these convicts who also plan to bring the Dregma Brothers over to Earth and somehow save Irma and Vernon.
160	18	"White Belt, Black Heart"	Bill Hutten and Tony Love	Jack Mendelsohn and Carole Mendelsohn	October 2, 1993	9062-9305
While Splinter's sensei Mogo-san is visiting New York, a criminal gang of ninja, known as the Black Heart Gang, are terrorizing the city with a crime spree, and Mogo-san's grandson, Yoku, is their leader. The Turtles and Splinter must stop Shredder and the Black Heart Gang from stealing secret maps of nuclear missile sites.: Last time James Avery voices Shredder.
161	19	"Night of the Rogues"	Bill Hutten and Tony Love	David Wise	October 2, 1993	9062-9308
In an attempt to finally defeat the Turtles once and for all while annoyed with Bebop and Rocksteady's incompetence, Shredder assembles Leatherhead, Tempestra, Chrome Dome, the Rat King, Slash, Antrax, and Scumbug to form a team that proves too much for the Turtles to handle on their own.: Townsend Coleman takes over voicing Shredder for the rest of the season.
162	20	"Attack of the Neutrinos"	Bill Hutten and Tony Love	David Wise	October 9, 1993	9062-9306
The Neutrinos are captured by the Rock Soldiers and Krang has them brainwashed to use against the Turtles, to which the Turtles must work together to undo the brainwashing to stop Krang's latest scheme
163	21	"Escape from the Planet of the Turtleoids"	Bill Hutten and Tony Love	David Wise	October 9, 1993	9062-9307
Kerma the Turtleoid returns once again for the Turtles help in programming his city's new defense robots, but Groundchuck and Dirtbag have also returned to the city upon escaping from their imprisonment to cause trouble when they ally with the cyborg space pirate Captain Dredd.
164	22	"Revenge of the Fly"	Bill Hutten and Tony Love	David Wise	October 16, 1993	9062-9309
Baxter Stockman and his alien computer return to Earth from the Dimensional Limbo and take possession of Shredder's Retro-Mutagen Ray Gun. After stealing the essences of various insects and arachnids, he uses them to turn people into mutant insects and arachnids. The Turtles must battle the creatures and turn the people back to normal.
165	23	"Atlantis Awakes"	Bill Hutten and Tony Love	David Wise	October 16, 1993	9062-9313
The Turtles discover an Atlantean city in modern times. After meeting Merdude, who in reality is the true King of Atlantis, the Turtles must defeat Shredder and dethrone Bebop, who been set up as a puppet king.
166	24	"Dirk Savage: Mutant Hunter!"	Bill Hutten and Tony Love	David Wise	October 23, 1993	9062-9310
When the evil mutants Tokka and Rahzar wreak havoc on the local mall, the city hires professional mutant hunter Dirk Savage to arrest the mutant population, including the Turtles, Genghis Frog, Napoleon Bonafrog, and Mondo Gecko. But genetics billionaire-turned-mutant slug A.J. Howard takes advantage of Savage's inability to trust mutants for his own plans.
167	25	"Invasion of the Krangazoids"	Bill Hutten and Tony Love	David Wise	October 23, 1993	9062-9314
In order to defeat the Turtles, Krang creates 6 clones of himself called Krangazoids to deal with them. But when the Krangazoids start to think for themselves and Krang loses control, the Turtles must save the city.
168	26	"Combat Land"	Bill Hutten and Tony Love	David Wise	October 30, 1993	9062-9311
A new amusement theme park called Combat Land which was established by Horatio Stressbar has opened with shogun, medieval, and future-themed attractions. The Turtles are invited to try out the attractions, but when the robots in the park start to play too rough, the Turtles are in big trouble.
169	27	"Shredder Triumphant!"	Bill Hutten and Tony Love	David Wise	October 30, 1993	9062-9312
After bringing the Technodrome back to the surface, Shredder and Krang trap the Turtles and send them to Dimension X where they become slaves. In the meantime, Shredder and Krang are back on Earth once again as they try to take over the world.: Last time Townsend Coleman voices Shredder.

== DVD release ==
For the 23 disc DVD set of all 10 seasons these episodes are listed as Episodes 14 - 20 on discs 19 and 20 of the 2012 collector's edition after the Vacation In Europe side season. Vacation in Europe was released on discs 17 and 18 of the 2012 DVD collection edition. Discs 17 - 20 are Season 7 in the collector's set.
