= Teenage Mutant Ninja Turtles (1987 TV series) season 10 =

Teenage Mutant Ninja Turtles
- Season 10
- No. of episodes: 8

Release
- Original network: CBS (Kidz (Action Zone))
- Original release: September 14 – November 2, 1996

Season chronology
- ← Previous; Season 9

The tenth and final season of the Teenage Mutant Ninja Turtles 1987 TV series. The Teenage Mutant Ninja Turtles continue their fight with Lord Dregg. Shredder and Krang return for a three-part episode and the Technodrome is still in Dimension X.

When the season aired, the interest for the Teenage Mutant Ninja Turtles had almost faded out. At the time, CBS was phasing out its Saturday-morning cartoon block.

== Episodes ==
- All eight tenth-season episodes were directed by Tony Love and written by Jeffrey Scott.

| No. overall | No. in season | Title | Original release date | TV broadcast |
|---|---|---|---|---|
| 186 | 1 | "The Return of Dregg" | September 14, 1996 | S10E01 |
While the Turtles work on using fragments of the Vortex Crystal to stabilize their mutations, Lord Dregg plans to use the fragments to create another Vortex Crystal to power his Vortex Transporter. Meanwhile, Lord Dregg's second-in-command HiTech is blasted into space by Dregg's top scientist Mung who replaces HiTech.
| 187 | 2 | "The Beginning of the End" | September 21, 1996 | S10E02 |
While Raphael, Michaelangelo, Donatello and Carter work on restoring Leonardo to his regular self, Mung steals all the plutonium from a power plant in order for Lord Dregg to build a Plutonium Ray to turn Leonardo into a radioactive killer.
| 188 | 3 | "The Power of Three" | September 28, 1996 | S10E03 |
Learning about the Turtles' previous arch-enemies Shredder and Krang, Lord Dregg teleports them from Dimension X to the Dregnaught in hopes of joining forces to destroy the Turtles once and for all. After permanently stabilizing his mutation, Carter finally leaves the Turtles and returns to college.
| 189 | 4 | "A Turtle in Time" | October 5, 1996 | S10E04 |
After draining the Turtles' life energy & Krang's intelligence, Lord Dregg becomes a super-being and plans to fire the Vortex Transporter at the Sun, bringing a piece of the Sun down to Earth. If the people of Earth refuse to surrender, Lord Dregg will cause the Earth to become a second Sun, and afterwards he will eventually do the same to every other planet in the universe. Meanwhile after learning of the situation, Carter returns, and knowing he can't handle it alone, Carter contacts the turtles' friends Landor and Merrick who brings the Turtles' past selves to the present as well as Splinter mentioning to him that despite his mutation being stabilized, there is a chance that Carter can still mutate.
| 190 | 5 | "Turtles to the Second Power" | October 12, 1996 | S10E05 |
After re-energizing the present-day Turtles, the Turtles of the past have only 3 hours to get back to their time, or they will all cease to exist. Meanwhile, during the 15 hours it took to re-energize the Turtles, the remainder of Dregg's invasion fleet has been completed and has been unleashed on the entire planet, and now the Turtles and Carter have to stop Lord Dregg, Krang, and Shredder. In the end, Shredder and Krang are sent back to Dimension X. After sending the past turtles back to their time, Landor and Merrick give Carter an offer to come with them to their time in the future to receive medical treatment that will completely cure him of his mutation. Carter accepts and he and the Turtles say their goodbyes before he teleports away.
| 191 | 6 | "Mobster from Dimension X" | October 19, 1996 | S10E06 |
A slimy amoeba-like mobster from Dimension X known as the Globfather steals the Protein Computer. The Globfather is working for Lord Dregg, who plans to use the Protein Computer to hack into all of Earth's telecommunications systems and military computers, to control them via his own brain.
| 192 | 7 | "The Day the Earth Disappeared" | October 26, 1996 | S10E07 |
Lord Dregg has managed to open a gigantic portal that is large enough to pull the entire Earth into Dimension X. While trying to figure out how to stop it, Leonardo, Donatello, and Master Splinter are pulled through the portal after Lord Dregg turns the portal on them, sending each of them across dangerous alien dimensions.
| 193 | 8 | "Divide and Conquer" | November 2, 1996 | S10E08 |
Lord Dregg, using a morphing suit capable of instantly draining life-force from others, absorbs the power of five super-beings, and multiplies their combined power a hundred-fold, becoming a god. He comes after the Turtles, who must travel to Dimension X and get Krang's android body from the destroyed Technodrome if they are to defeat him, after defeating Lord Dregg, Splinter calls them his equals, just as Donatello's microwave popcorn goes out of control.
