= Teenage Mutant Ninja Turtles (1987 TV series) season 5 =

Teenage Mutant Ninja Turtles
- Season 5
- No. of episodes: 20

Release
- Original network: CBS
- Original release: September 14 – November 16, 1991

Season chronology
- ← Previous; Season 4 Next → Season 6

The fifth season of Teenage Mutant Ninja Turtles aired in 1991. In the season premiere, the Technodrome escapes from Dimension X again, but thanks to Donatello's quick thinking, it crash lands and ends up frozen at the North Pole for most of the season. The transport modules from season 3 are reused, this time to drill underneath Canada and into New York City.

Episodes #119 and #120 originally ran as a 1-hour prime-time special titled "Planet of the Turtleoids". When reran, it was split into two parts.

== Episodes ==
- All twenty fifth-season episodes were directed by Fred Wolf.

| No. overall | No. in season | Title | Written by | Original release date | TV broadcast |
|---|---|---|---|---|---|
| 107 | 1 | "My Brother, the Bad Guy" | Dennis O'Flaherty | September 14, 1991 | S05E01 |
A family secret is revealed when Lieutenant Kazou Saki of the Tokyo Metropolitan Police arrives from Japan to arrest his brother Oroku Saki, who turns out to be the Turtles' greatest enemy. Shredder and Krang manage to get the Technodrome out of Dimension X and back to Earth again, but Donatello re-programs it to crash in the Arctic.
| 108 | 2 | "Michaelangelo Meets Mondo Gecko" | Gary Greenfield | September 14, 1991 | S05E02 |
Michaelangelo's strange dreams lead him to seek out Mondo Gecko, a gecko who was caught in the same ooze as the Turtles. Gecko eventually rebels against his boss Mr. X and his bombing campaign. Note: First Appearance of Mondo Gecko.
| 109 | 3 | "Enter: Mutagen Man" | David Wise | September 21, 1991 | S05E03 |
A delivery man named Seymour Gutz accidentally falls into Krang's new unstable Mutagen and becomes Mutagen Man who is able to transform into anyone he chooses. Shredder tricks him into helping him launch the Mutagen into space and mutate the world, but this "Mutagen Man" has other ideas.
| 110 | 4 | "Donatello's Badd Time" | Misty Taggart | September 21, 1991 | S05E04 |
Donatello has tricked out the Turtle Van, but while taking it for a test drive, it's stolen from him by a family of robbing hillbillies called the Badd Family. Can Donatello get the Van back in time before his brothers find out?
| 111 | 5 | "Michaelangelo Meets Bugman Again" | David Wise | September 28, 1991 | S05E05 |
When the city is hit with a sudden termite infestation, the only superhero who can help named Bugman is too at peace with himself to aid the Turtles in defeating it. They also end up fighting a villain called the Swatter. Note: This is a follow-up to the fourth season episode "Michaelangelo Meets Bugman".
| 112 | 6 | "Muckman Messes Up" | Francis Moss and Ted Pedersen | September 28, 1991 | S05E06 |
An accident causes two waste collectors named Garson Grunge and Joe Junkee to mutate into Muckman and Joe Eyeball. Muckman's slime is found to weaken the Turtles and Shredder tricks him into working with him.
| 113 | 7 | "Napoleon Bonafrog: Colossus of the Swamps" | Dennis O'Flaherty | October 5, 1991 | S05E07 |
While testing an experimental Muta-Shooter invented by Krang, Shredder unexpectedly turns Napoleon Bonafrog into a muscular, monstrous version of himself.
| 114 | 8 | "Raphael Versus The Volcano" | Carole Mendelsohn | October 5, 1991 | S05E08 |
A malfunction of Donatello's latest invention ultimately results in Raphael believing he is about to die, and ultimately trying to save the world by himself Title Reference: Joe Versus the Volcano
| 115 | 9 | "Landlord of the Flies" | Gordon Bressack | October 12, 1991 | S05E09 |
Baxter Stockman leads a swarm of flies in an attempt to conquer New York and prove his worth to Shredder and Krang so he can become human again. Title Reference: Lord of the Flies Note #1: This episode is a follow-up to "Son of Return of the Fly II". Note #2: He will also return in the seventh season in the last appearance of the series "Revenge of the Fly".
| 116 | 10 | "Donatello's Duplicate" | Jack Mendelsohn & Carole Mendelsohn | October 12, 1991 | S05E10 |
Tired of fixing everything in the lair, Donatello decides to clone himself so he can work on his other inventions. However, Donatello's clone turns against him and joins the Rat King in an attempt to conquer the city with a rat infestation.
| 117 | 11 | "The Ice Creature Cometh" | David Wise | October 19, 1991 | S05E11 |
Bebop and Rocksteady botch another mutagen experiment, resulting in the ice outside the Technodrome mutating into a giant-sized ice creature who Bebop dubs "Frosty". Shredder uses this monster to freeze New York solid, preoccupying the Turtles long enough for him to steal thermal explosives needed to melt the Technodrome free from the ice. Title Reference: The Iceman Cometh
| 118 | 12 | "Leonardo Cuts Loose" | David Wise | October 19, 1991 | S05E12 |
A nerd-turned-muscleman named Wally Airhead captures three of the Turtles and a reluctant Leonardo must ask Casey Jones for help in rescuing them.
| 119 | 13 | "Planet of the Turtleoids" | David Wise | August 31, 1991 (prime-time); October 26, 1991 (Saturday) | S05E19 |
| 120 | 14 | "Planet of the Turtleoids" | David Wise | August 31, 1991 (prime-time); October 26, 1991 (Saturday) | S05E20 |
Planet of the Turtleoids Pt. 1: The Turtles use electricity to restore the mutant hamster Tattoo to his original form. Following the incident, Shredder and Krang plan to create more mutants to help them steal a ruby. They head to the City Wild Animal Park to prepare to mutate a lion and a gorilla. While they are away, a "Turtleloid" named Kerma arrives on Earth. He arrives at the City Wild Animal Park where he frees the lion and gorilla. Bebop and Rocksteady's bumbling causes a cattle and a mole to get free and they get mutated instead. With the mutants taking the names of Groundchuck and Dirtbag, Shredder ends up using them in his heist. Though Groundchuck and Dirtbag plan to cause havoc instead. The Turtles fight Groundchuck and Dirtbag where they end up taken away in Kerma's spaceship to Shell-Ri-La. With the Turtles gone, April is abducted as Shredder uses the stolen diamond to build a towering robot called Chrome Dome. Planet of the Turtleoids Pt. 2: With the Turtles on Shellri-La, they must help Kerma defend his planet from a two-headed dragon named Herman the Horrible as Groundchuck and Dirtbag work with him. Herman the Horrible is defeated by the Turtles using the Pulverizing Ray and is exposed as a giant machine operated by two renegade Turtleoid delegates on Shell-Ri-La named Bork and Dwork who wanted to use Herman the Horrible to get access to the gold-making machine on Shell-Ri-La. With Groundchuck and Dirtbag detained and Kerma planning to visit Earth again, the Turtles return to Earth where they must destroy Shredder's new Technodrome Mark II and then defeat Chrome Dome. While Raphael felt bad for Donatello not wanting the Turtles to remain on Shell-Ri-La, Donatello admits that it has no pizza or video games.
| 121 | 15 | "Pirate Radio" | Misty Taggart | November 2, 1991 | S05E13 |
Using a hypnotic microphone and speaker, Shredder takes over a radio station and broadcasts a signal that sends the population of New York City sailing into a dimensional limbo dubbed "Krang's Chasm".
| 122 | 16 | "Raphael, Turtle of a Thousand Faces" | Dennis O'Flaherty | November 2, 1991 | S05E14 |
Raphael's latest study of disguises leads the Turtles to attempt a rescue when he is mistaken for a mobster named "Mad Dog McMutt".
| 123 | 17 | "Leonardo, the Renaissance Turtle" | Dennis O'Flaherty | November 9, 1991 | S05E15 |
A mad professor named Ignatz Mindbender creates a law-enforcement robot named "LEX" to clean up crime in New York, but LEX ultimately starts arresting numerous innocent people for the smallest infraction. With the other Turtles unreachable, Leonardo must discover his own innate skills to stop this rogue robot before he and Mindbender declare themselves dictators of the city.
| 124 | 18 | "Zach and the Alien Invaders" | Francis Moss and Ted Pedersen | November 9, 1991 | S05E16 |
Zach, the Turtles' young friend, is put into military camp by his parents after making numerous false reports of aliens only to find two real aliens named Wingnut and Screwloose brainwashing the cadets to be their army and must call in the Turtles to defeat them. Title Reference: Zak McKracken and the Alien Mindbenders
| 125 | 19 | "Welcome Back Polarisoids" | Misty Taggart | November 16, 1991 | S05E17 |
Frip the Polarisoid arrives back on Earth with his family (consisting of wife Millimeter, son F-Stop, and daughter Saycheez) for a visit and must ultimately ask the Turtles for help in reclaiming his camera while helping them stop Krang's latest plan to conquer the city.
| 126 | 20 | "Michalangelo, the Sacred Turtle" | Dennis O'Flaherty | November 16, 1991 | S05E18 |
While on a visit to an Egyptian Exhibit, Michaelangelo is mistaken for a Pharaoh named "Amun Turt-El", also known as "The Sacred Turtle".

== Notes ==
"Planet Of The Turtleoids" is included in the season 10 DVD as a bonus episode uncut as well as "Once Upon A Time Machine"
