= Teenage Mutant Ninja Turtles (1987 TV series) season 4 =

Teenage Mutant Ninja Turtles
- Season 4
- No. of episodes: 41

Release
- Original network: Syndication; CBS
- Original release: September 1, 1990 – May 1991

Season chronology
- ← Previous; Season 3 Next → Season 5

The fourth season of Teenage Mutant Ninja Turtles is split into two main sub-sections that aired concurrently: thirteen episodes which aired daily in syndication, and twenty-six episodes that premiered in hour-long double-bills on Saturday mornings on CBS. Additionally, a two-part "Easter special" aired in syndication the following Spring.

The syndication episodes featured the original title sequence, while the CBS episodes debuted a new title sequence, also did away with the show's title cards, and included a brief "Turtle Tips" segment between the two episodes which served as a PSA about the environment or other issues. There were a total of 20 "Turtle Tips" segments produced and aired.

During this season, the Technodrome is back in Dimension X, having been launched from Earth through a portal at the conclusion of season 3. The first syndicated episode, "Plan 6 from Outer Space", detailed how the villains' battle fortress crash-landed on an asteroid; in the first CBS episode, "The Dimension X Story", a volcano on the asteroid erupted, immobilizing the Technodrome by surrounding it with molten lava.

Note that the "Vacation in Europe" episodes in season 7 take place between seasons 3 and 4.

== Episodes ==
- All forty-one fourth-season episodes were directed by Fred Wolf.

No. overall	No. in season	Title	Written by	Original release date	Production code
66	1	"The Dimension X Story"	David Wise	September 1, 1990 (CBS)	9061-001
Shredder has a plan to destroy the Turtles. With the Technodrome's portal out of commission, he is unable to challenge them on Earth. So he uses the Dimensional Teleporter to bring his enemies to Dimension X. Note: This is the final episode in which Michaelangelo uses nunchaku as his main weapon rather than a grappling hook.
67	2	"Donatello's Degree"	Jack Mendelsohn	September 1, 1990 (CBS)	9061-014
Donatello earns his degree from Sopho University, but discovers that he has been mistaken for a girl, so he asks Irma to masquerade as him. Meanwhile, the real Donatello discovers a plot by Professor Filo Sopho to destroy the Earth. Note: First appearance of Professor Filo Sopho.
68	3	"Son of Return of the Fly II"	David Wise	September 8, 1990 (CBS)	9061-002
Vengeful Baxter Stockman and the A.I. computer return to Earth from a dimensional limbo and capture the Turtles while luring Shredder into their trap as well.
69	4	"Raphael Knocks 'Em Dead"	Jack Mendelsohn	September 8, 1990 (CBS)	9061-016
Raphael must contend with a crime boss named Pinky McFingers when he is kidnapped from a local comedy club. Pinky also makes use of Baxter Stockman's twin brother Barney Stockman who hates being compared to him. Note: First appearance of Pinky McFingers.
70	5	"The Big Cufflink Caper!"	David Wise	September 14, 1990 (CBS primetime); November 10, 1990 (CBS)	9061-005
The Turtles switch sides and discover that the Shredder is the main man behind a ring of cufflink thefts that has suddenly hit New York City.
71	6	"Bebop and Rocksteady Conquer the Universe"	David Wise	September 15, 1990 (CBS)	9061-008
On their latest trip to Earth, Bebop and Rocksteady steal a machine that makes everyone scared of everything.
72	7	"Raphael Meets His Match"	Charles M. Howell IV	September 15, 1990 (CBS)	9061-015
Raphael wins a place at the owner of a fast food chain's party. When the yacht is taken hostage by the high-tech pirate Captain Filch and his mutant anemonies, he and the mysterious mutant salamander Mona Lisa work together to stop them.
73	8	"Leonardo Lightens Up"	Dan DiStefano	September 22, 1990 (CBS)	9061-018
Frustrated with his bossy nature, Raphael and Michaelangelo accidentally shoot Leonardo with the personality modifying ray, turning him into a fun loving "dude" who neglects his responsibilities. Donatello, Raphael and Michaelangelo must stop the musical maestro G. Cleff from destroying the city.
74	9	"Slash - The Evil Turtle from Dimension X"	David Wise	September 22, 1990 (CBS)	9061-009
Bebop and Rocksteady use Krang's new Mutagen on Bebop's pet turtle Slash so he can do their housework for them. Slash runs away and is conned by an irritated entrepreneur named Donald J. Loffy and his underling Fenton Q. Hackenbush into framing the TMNT.
75	10	"Farewell, Lotus Blossom!"	David Wise	September 29, 1990 (CBS)	9061-004
Lotus Blossom's nightmares draw her to a strange artifact in the Turtles' possession. The artifact contains an angry spirit, whose dearest wife's spirit/soul is lying deep within Lotus herself.
76	11	"Were-Rats from Channel 6"	David Wise	October 6, 1990 (CBS)	9061-007
After many failed attempts from his rodent subjects to find food, the Rat King learns of an abandoned canister of mutagen lost in the sewers and claims it for himself. Then, he kidnaps Irma and Vernon and uses the mutagen to transform them into his mutant rat slaves, for the sole purpose of raiding food warehouses. It is later discovered that the mutations are unstable and can only be active if the Rat King plays his hypnotic flute.
77	12	"Funny, They Shrunk Michaelangelo"	Michael Edens	October 6, 1990 (CBS)	9061-019
When Michaelangelo decides to put one of Donatello's inventions on max power for his own entertainment, he ends in a—quite literally—little problem. April and Vernon get caught in the shrinking ray while getting footage of a military ship and join Michaelangelo on his wild adventure.
78	13	"The Big Zipp Attack"	David Wise	October 13, 1990 (CBS)	9061-003
An alien called a "Zipp" is sent to Earth, but this little alien soon becomes a big problem even when it gets targeted by Shredder, Rocksteady, Bebop.
79	14	"Donatello Makes Time"	Dennis Marks	October 13, 1990 (CBS)	9061-017
Donatello invents a machine that can freeze time, which a deranged professor named Lloyd Cycloid steals as part of a plan to conquer the world.
80	15	"Rebel Without a Fin"	Michael Reaves	October 20, 1990 (CBS)	9061-010
A mad scientist named Dr. Polidorius plans to mutate all humanity into aquatic-beings. He creates Ray (not the similarly-named Ray Fillet), a piscine humanoid who possesses several abilities of different marine species like a manta ray, an octopus, an electric eel, a blowfish, and a scorpionfish. Ray kidnaps April O'Neil, and Polidorius mutates her into a fish-woman to be Ray's mate.
81	16	"Rhino-Man"	David Wise	October 27, 1990 (CBS)	9061-006
Rich tycoon J. Gordon Hungerdunger runs a contest for the best superhero, with a phony diamond as a prize, to cover up a scheme to hypnotize the world. Even the Foot Clan gets suckered into this contest, with Bebop and Rocksteady dressing up as superheroes called Rhino-Man and Mighty Hog so they can win the diamond and use to power up a laser that Krang has created.
82	17	"Michaelangelo Meets Bugman"	Dennis Marks	October 27, 1990 (CBS)	9061-020
Michaelangelo meets his favorite comic book hero Bugman after he saves a weakened Brick Bradley in the sewers. Then he and Bugman take on the evil Electrozapper together.
83	18	"Poor Little Rich Turtle"	David Wise	November 3, 1990 (CBS)	9061-011
The Turtles must baby-sit and protect a young rich girl named Buffy Shellhammer from Shredder and Krang as she knows of a formula for a super fuel needed for the Technodrome.
84	19	"What's Michaelangelo Good For?"	Ted Pedersen and Francis Moss	November 3, 1990 (CBS)	9061-022
Michaelangelo must rescue the other Turtles when they are captured by an evil scientist/ex-zoo director named Dr. Lesseau who is creating animal hybrids to find the right one that will help him take over the world and get him his job back.
85	20	"Leonardo Versus Tempestra"	Misty Taggart	November 10, 1990 (CBS)	9061-021
Leonardo becomes addicted to a new arcade game called "Tempestra's Revenge" which ends up affecting his usual routine. The arcade game has the player fighting the evil sorceress Tempestra who can control the weather, create different creatures to serve her, and possesses telekinesis. But when a freak power surge releases Tempestra from the arcade cabinet, Leonardo has to stop her digital wrath before she becomes dangerously powerful. Note: First appearance of Tempestra.
86	21	"Splinter Vanishes"	Francis Moss and Ted Pedersen	November 17, 1990 (CBS)	9061-026
Splinter has suddenly disappeared, and a note left behind from him forces the Turtles to go their separate ways. One by one, they are captured by Leatherhead and the Rat King who have joined forces to take out their mutual enemies.
87	22	"Big Bug Blunder"	Michael Reeves	November 24, 1990 (CBS)	9061-013
A failed mutagen experiment by Krang combined with an incident caused by Rocksteady and Bebop's clumsiness results in a giant fly, a giant mantis, a giant mud wasp, and a giant scorpion invading New York City. Meanwhile, the Turtles are visited by Genghis Frog of the Punk Frogs
88	23	"The Foot Soldiers Are Revolting"	Michael Reaves	November 24, 1990 (CBS)	9061-012
A Foot Soldier named Alpha-1 has his intelligence increased, but it results in a Foot Soldier rebellion against Shredder and Krang and the duos exile from the Technodrome. This causes the Turtles to work together with Rocksteady and Bebop to stop Alpha-1
89	24	"Beyond the Donatello Nebula"	Dennis O'Flaherty	December 1, 1990 (CBS)	9061-023
While trying to contact the Turtle Nebula, Donatello meets an intelligent lizard alien named Algernon ("Algae" for short), who must help him and the other Turtles rescue April from a greedy gangster named "Hostile" Hiram Grelch.
90	25	"Unidentified Flying Leonardo"	Sean Roche	December 1, 1990 (CBS)	9061-024
While helping April investigate a report of giant monsters attacking a superstitious farming village in High Falls within Upstate New York, Leonardo is mistaken for an alien from another planet. The lone Turtle must avoid being hunted down into extinction while also trying to rescue April from a mad scientist named Dr. Danvers who is plotting to enlarge the local vegetables and get rich off them.
91	26	"Plan Six from Outer Space"	David Wise	December 1990 (Syndication)	9060-066
With the Technodrome in serious need for new equipment, Bebop and Rocksteady are sent to Earth, disguised in human form, to capture the Channel 6 building and take it to Dimension X. To keep the Turtles distracted, Bebop and also deploy a robot duplicate of Master Splinter, but it malfunctions and starts going gonzo.
92	27	"Turtles of the Jungle"	Misty Taggart	December 1990 (Syndication)	9060-067
A new ray-gun invented by Professor Willard W. Willard causes plants to go wild and his pet ape Jocko to become a giant rampaging monkey. By using the same ray-gun, Donatello is increased to Jocko's size so he can fight the giant ape and save April from him.
93	28	"Name That Toon"	Misty Taggart	December 1990 (Syndication)	9060-074
A Technodrome computer disguised as an electronic keyboard ends up on Earth and in the most unlikely of hands of Irma's friend Howie Hardy.
94	29	"Menace Maestro, Please"	Martin Pasko	December 1990 (Syndication)	9060-075
The Turtles meet Irma's boyfriend Howie Hardy, who has bought an old opera house with the intent of turning it into a nightclub. The Turtles must contend with the "Phantom of the Floxy", as does Shredder, who is planning to get the Technodrome back to Earth.
95	30	"Super Hero for a Day"	Francis Moss and Ted Pedersen	December 1990 (Syndication)	9060-079
Gadget Man comes out of retirement after 50 years, but is tricked by Shredder into fighting against the Turtles.
96	31	"Back to the Egg"	Dennis Marks	December 1990 (Syndication)	9060-080
Krang hires a multi-dimensional ringmaster named Captain Krulik who intends on making the Teenage Mutant Ninja Turtles part of his circus by using an anti-aging serum. Leonardo and Michaelangelo are turned into 5-year olds.
97	32	"Raphael Drives 'em Wild"	Misty Taggart	January 12, 1991 (CBS)	9061-025
A machine called the Transmogrifier causes Raphael and a cab driver to swap bodies and it is later discovered that a defect in that same small device could do some very big damage to the city if activated.
98	33	"Peking Turtle"	Antonio Ortiz and Carmela Ortiz	February 1991 (Syndication)	9060-069
The Turtles must battle a reanimated terracotta army after Shredder steals an energy device shaped like a giant pearl, which is held and guarded by a jade dragon.
99	34	"Planet of the Turtles"	George Shea	February 1991 (Syndication)	9060-073
The Turtles must save the Earth from a massive energy drain and its apocalyptic result caused by the Personal Energy Projector stolen by Shredder by traveling to another planet where turtles are the dominant species as they look for the Personal Energy Projector's inventor Dr. Turtlestein.
100	35	"Turtlemaniac"	Rowby Goren	February 1991 (Syndication)	9060-072
An eccentric billionaire named Monroe Q. Flem, who is also a collector, wishes to collect every piece of TMNT memorabilia that he can get his evil hands on, including April O'Neil and the Turtles themselves.
101	36	"Michaelangelo Toys Around"	Ted Pedersen and Francis Moss	February 1991 (Syndication)	9060-068
While trying to see the new toys at the Toy Fair, Michaelangelo stumbles upon a plot by the toymaker Wilbur Weazell to take over a noted toy company called Tyler Toys.
102	37	"Shredder's Mom"	Ted Pedersen and Francis Moss	1991 (Syndication)	9060-070
Krang frees Miyoko Saki, Shredder's mother from the retirement community. Shredder threatens the world's governments to surrender to Krang or he will gradually raise the world's heat, which causes New York to be in the middle of a massive heat wave. The Turtles get help from air force officer Colonel Yogurt to thwart Shredder who is starting to get annoyed with his mother's success.
103	38	"Four Turtles and a Baby"	Misty Taggart	1991 (Syndication)	9060-071
When General Tragg and his troops attack the Neutrino planet capital, the Neutrino leaders King Zenter and Queen Gizzla send their infant daughter Tribble through a portal to Earth, asking the Turtles to look after her, but Tribble causes big trouble for our heroes.
104	39	"Rondo in New York"	Francis Moss and Ted Pedersen	1991 (Syndication)	9060-078
A big-time Hollywood action movie star named Rondo arrives in New York to promote his newest movie. Unfortunately, reality hits hard for Michaelangelo as he discovers that the actor portraying his movie idol is not all he's cracked up to be. Meanwhile, Shredder and Krang steal a Vitilizer chemical from a grad student/theater projectionist named Oswald Dren that can bring inanimate objects to life. It gets exposed to some film reels that bring to life Count Dracula, Frankenstein's monster, a giant slug, and a mummy. The actual Rondo is also brought to life where he helps the Turtles fight Shredder and Krang. Note: Rondo is a parody of John Rambo.
105	40	"The Turtles and The Hare"	Misty Taggart	May 1991 (Syndication)	9060-076
The Turtles travel to a fairy tale dimension in an attempt to save the city from Shredder's Docilizer, while also making friends with a local citizen of that dimension Hokum Hare (based on the Hare character from "The Tortoise and the Hare").
106	41	"Once Upon a Time Machine"	Michael Maurer	May 1991 (Syndication)	9060-077
Set up as a follow-up episode, Hokum Hare and the Turtles hitch a ride on a time-traveling train to 2036 where they discover that Shredder has plans for the future New York City. Ultimately, the Turtles of both the past and the future must team up to thwart Shredder before his actions in the future causes all of time to be destroyed. Note: Final episode to premiere in syndication.
