= Teenage Mutant Ninja Turtles (1987 TV series) season 1 =

Teenage Mutant Ninja Turtles
- Season 1
- No. of episodes: 5

Release
- Original network: Syndication
- Original release: December 28, 1987 – January 1, 1988

Season chronology
- Next → Season 2

The first season of Teenage Mutant Ninja Turtles is the first season of the series aired in syndication. At this point in the series, the Technodrome is located underneath New York City. Chronologically, this is the 5-part pilot episode, "Heroes in a Half Shell".

== Episodes ==
- All five first-season episodes were written by David Wise and Patti Howeth. The chief director was Yoshikatsu Kasai, who was not credited in the credits of the English version.

No. overall	No. in season	Title	Animation directed by	Original release date	TV broadcast
1	1	"Turtle Tracks"	Fred Wolf & Vincent Davis	December 28, 1987	S01E01
New York City is experiencing a crime wave. Reporter April O'Neil discovers the thieves are ninja. As a street gang attacks April, she escapes into the sewers, where four big talking turtles defeat the thugs, and take April to their lair. There April meets their mentor, a rat named Splinter, who tells her his backstory as the Japanese ninja Hamato Yoshi. As the Turtles and April investigate the streets for the thieves' origins, they discover a group of robot ninjas whose uniform Splinter recognizes as belonging to the Foot Clan. Before April can expose them, she's kidnapped by the Shredder. The Turtles race to free her.: First appearances of Leonardo, Donatello, Raphael, Michaelangelo, April O'Neil, Master Splinter, Shredder, Bebop and Rocksteady, Burne Thompson and Vernon Fenwick.
2	2	"Enter The Shredder"	Fred Wolf & Vincent Davis	December 29, 1987	S01E02
Foot Clan leader Oroku Saki, aka the Shredder, decides, along with his partner Krang from Dimension X, to turn some thugs into mutant henchmen using the mutagen that created Splinter and the TMNT. Thus two members of the street gang, Bebop and Rocksteady are respectively mutated into a common warthog and a black rhinoceros upon coming in contact with the animals that were stolen from the zoo. The Foot Soldiers kidnap Splinter, and the Turtles go rescue him at the Technodrome. Notes: First appearances of Krang and the Technodrome. The image used during the end credits for seasons one through three is taken from this episode; specifically at 03m 19.8s, when April sees the Technodrome drilling through the ground.: In a "Shellshocked" podcast interview David Wise revealed that the Technodrome (described as a city on tank threads in the script) was inspired by the mothership from "Close Encounters of the Third Kind".
3	3	"A Thing About Rats"	Fred Wolf & Vincent Davis	December 30, 1987	S01E03
The Shredder hires the scientist Baxter Stockman because his invention, rat-seeking robots named Mousers, can help him find Splinter. After an initial Mouser attack, the Turtles and Splinter hide in April's apartment.: First appearance of Baxter Stockman.; According to Fred Wolf this episode was animated in South Korea.
4	4	"Hot Rodding Teenagers from Dimension X"	Fred Wolf & Vincent Davis	December 31, 1987	S01E04
Shredder opens the portal to Dimension X for the first time. Three teenage kids known as Neutrinos and two of Krang's stone warriors emerge. The turtles befriend the teens, but before long, the two stone warriors set up a special weather-making device that causes trouble.: First appearances of The Neutrinos (Kala, Dask, and Zak), General Traag and the Turtle Van.
5	5	"Shredder & Splintered"	Bill Wolf	January 1, 1988	S01E05
Shredder transmits a message to the turtles showing off a retro-mutagen gun that could turn Splinter back into a human as demonstrated on one of Bebop and Rocksteady's gang members. When Splinter goes after the gun, Shredder then has completed Krang's new body and puts him in it. Then after the Turtles come to help Splinter, they have to deal with Krang and his new body. Then after the turtles defeat Krang and Splinter destroys that retro-mutagen gun to save the turtles, Shredder and Krang try to open the portal again. Donatello reverses the polarity causing the entire Technodrome to be pulled into Dimension X. Notes: First appearances of Krang's android body and the Turtle Blimp. Final episode where Vernon Fenwick is voiced by Pat Fraley.: According to the storyboard, the episode's title is supposed to be "Shredded & Splintered"; In an interview with Comics Scene magazine, Peter Laird and Kevin Eastman revealed that the original premise of the episode had Shredder becoming Krang's new body. They vetoed it as they felt it would take away each character's uniqueness. Another thing that was changed is turtles befriending Baxter Stockman and claiming the Technodrome for themselves after defeating Krang/Shredder.

== Notes ==
In late 1989 the first five episodes from series 1 were adapted in a 50-minute video special called The Epic Begins (also known as How It All Began) released by Family Home Entertainment in the US and Tempo Video/Abbey Home Entertainment in the UK (with the British title called Teenage Mutant HERO Turtles). The footage from this season was taken from a third-season clip show called Blast From The Past, and this was amalgamated with various series 2 episodes.

The five episodes were later adapted into the first three issue miniseries of Teenage Mutant Ninja Turtles Adventures by Archie Comics under the name Heroes in a Half-Shell. This adaptation would be collected into one book and published under the name Heroes in a Half-Shell: The Complete Adventure by Random House Publishing in 1989, coupled with a cassette featuring an audio play performed by an uncredited voice cast.

These five episodes, along with the opening, were animated by Toei Animation Studios.
