= Power Tower (Linz) =

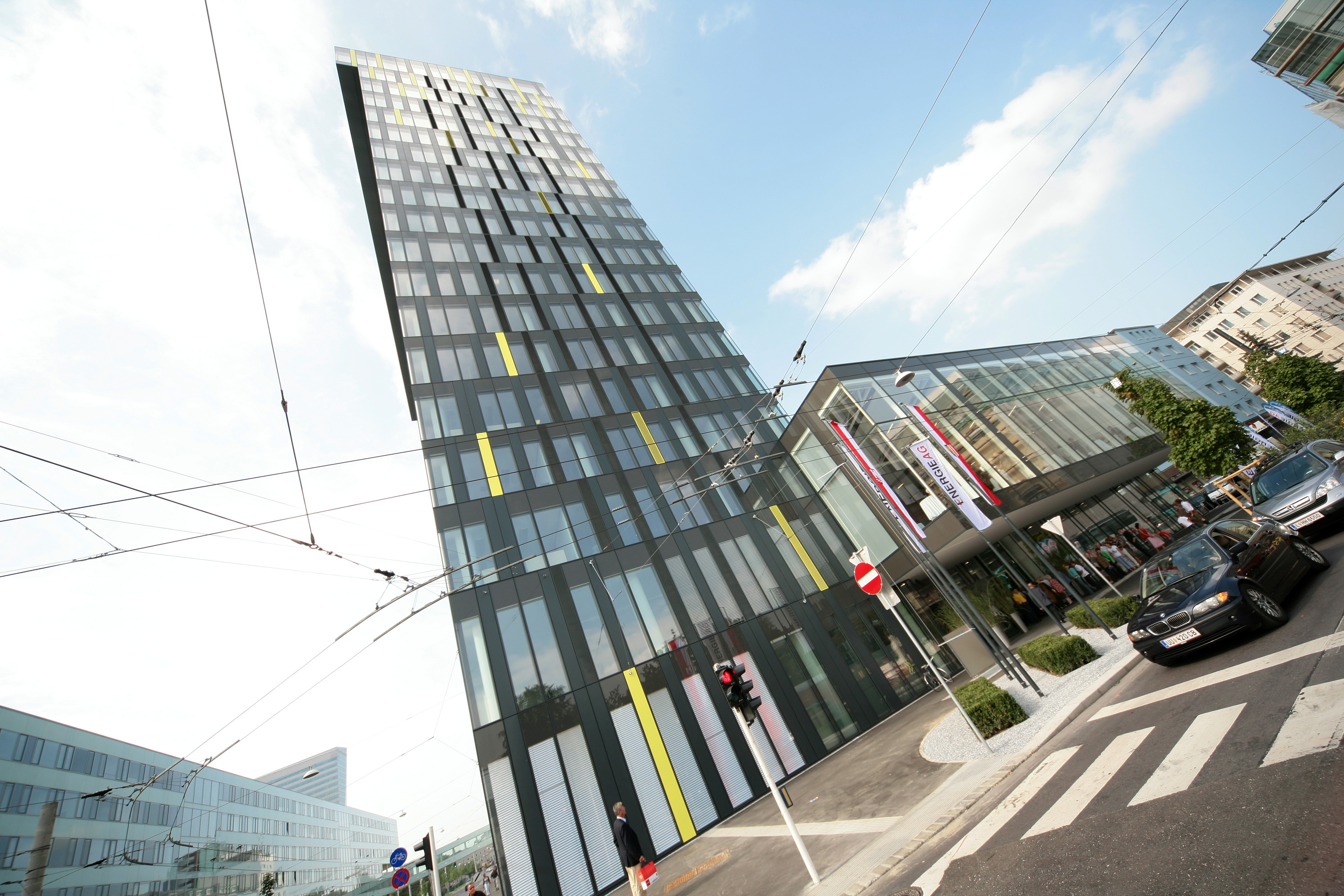
- The Power Tower by day.
- Interactive map of the Power Tower area

General information
- Type: Office Tower
- Location: Linz, Austria
- Coordinates: 48°17′36″N 14°17′26″E
- Current tenants: Energie AG
- Construction started: 2006
- Completed: 2008
- Inaugurated: 2008-09-08

Height
- Height: 74 m

Technical details
- Floor count: 19
- Floor area: 22,652 m^2

Design and construction
- Architect: Kaufmann
- Architecture firm: Weber & Hofer, Zürich, Switzerland

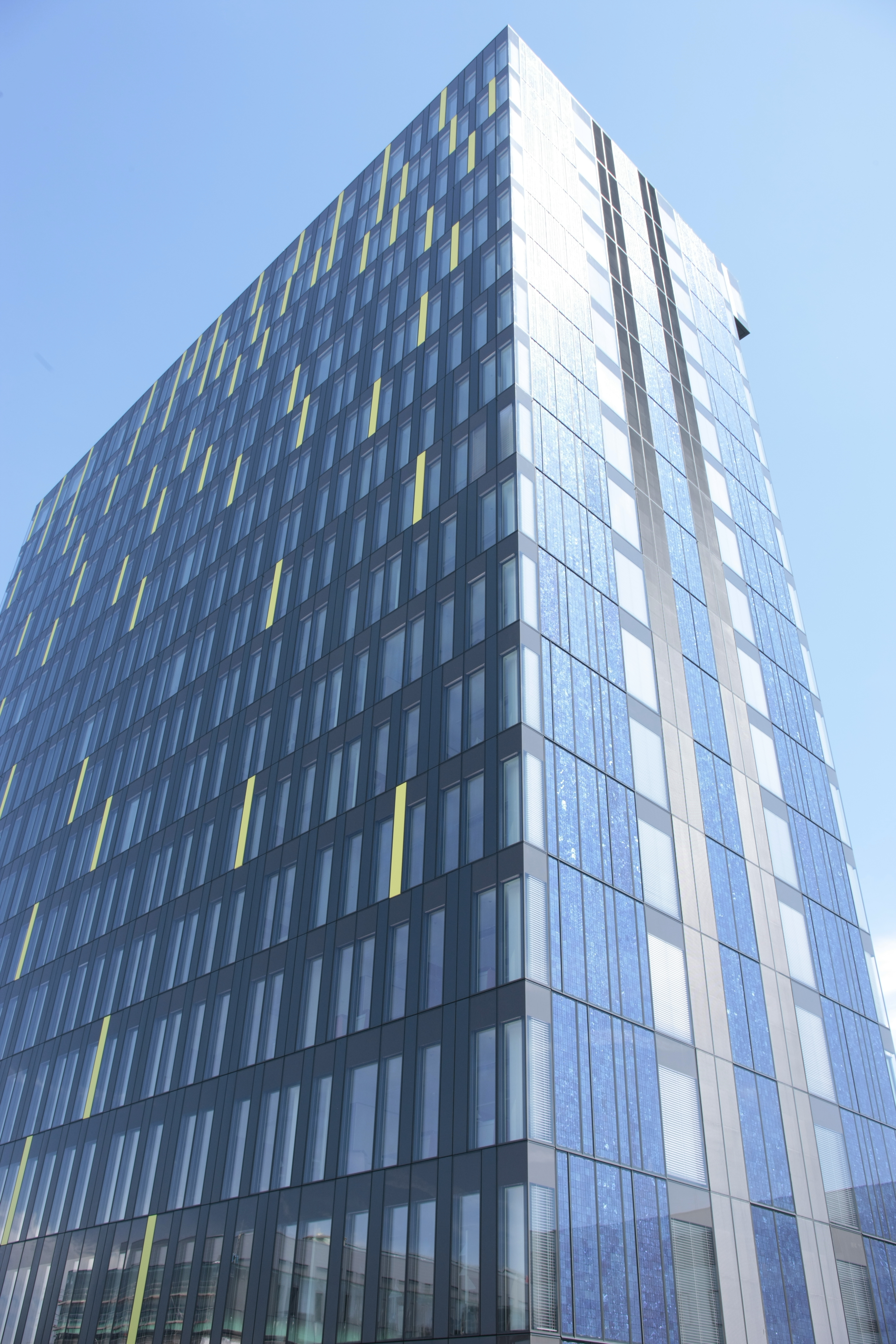
The Facade of the Power Tower

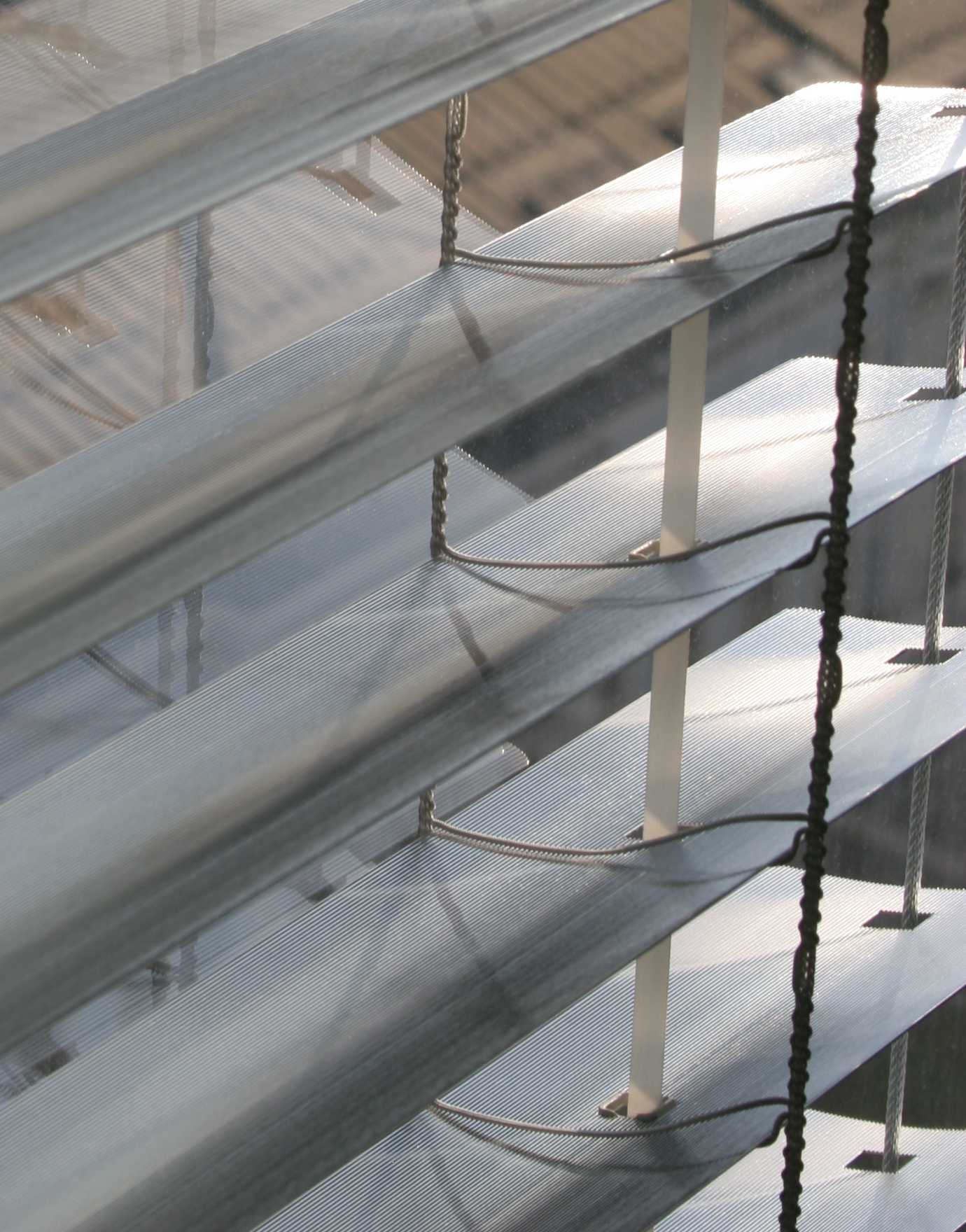
Integrated louvers to manage solar gain.

The Power Tower is the first high-rise office tower to attempt to meet the strict Passive House energy efficiency building standard. It was built to house the corporate headquarters of the Austrian utility company Energie AG in Linz, Austria.

In accordance with the Passive House standard the building has no connection to the local district heating system, and requires no fossil fuel inputs to maintain a comfortable interior climate, resulting in much lower carbon dioxide emissions than comparable buildings.

== History ==
In 2004 Energie AG decided to replace its corporate headquarters, built in the 1930s, with a much more efficient building. After an architectural competition the Zürich firm Weber/Hofer was chosen to lead the design effort. In the spring of 2006 construction began on the 3,750 m^2 lot. The site houses a parking garage, a two story building, and the 19-story office tower. Construction was completed in the late summer of 2008, and the building now provides offices for 600 employees of 13 different companies.

August 2005	Staff relocated to temporary accommodations
November 2005	Old building gutted
January 2006	Demolition begins
March 2006	Excavation of site and geothermal wells
May 2006	Construction begins
September 2008	Occupation of the building

== Building Energy Systems ==
The Power Tower minimizes its external energy consumption via several integrated systems.

=== Advanced Building Envelope ===
The building envelope was specially engineered to allow maximum daylighting while minimizing solar gain, which would normally be excessive and require a great deal of active cooling, given that two thirds of the facade is composed of glazing.

=== Geothermal Heating and Cooling ===
Beneath the building, 46 geothermal wells, each 150 m deep were drilled prior to construction.
