= Teenage Mutant Ninja Turtles (1987 TV series) season 6 =

Teenage Mutant Ninja Turtles
- Season 6
- No. of episodes: 16

Release
- Original network: CBS
- Original release: September 19 – November 7, 1992

Season chronology
- ← Previous; Season 5 Next → Season 7

The sixth season of Teenage Mutant Ninja Turtles aired in 1992. In this season, the Technodrome is located at the bottom of the Arctic Ocean. Transport Modules are used to travel between the Technodrome and New York City.

== Episodes ==
- All sixteen sixth-season episodes were directed by Fred Wolf.

No. overall	No. in season	Title	Written by	Original release date	Prod. code
127	1	"Rock Around the Block"	David Wise	September 19, 1992	9062-9201
As part of his latest plan, Krang brings General Traag to Earth from Dimension X as a distraction for the Turtles, while Krang tries to turn a laser at the ice and free the Technodrome from its prison at the North Pole. Meanwhile, Donatello learns a new fighting move called Wu Wei where one ninja turns his opponent's attack against him without action.
128	2	"Krangenstein Lives!"	David Wise	September 26, 1992	9062-9202
When Bebop and Rocksteady accidentally wreck one of the computer chips in Krang's robot body and try to replace it with a chip from a portable game system, it comes to life and goes on a rampage. While chasing after it, Shredder has a big fall which makes him suffer amnesia. Meanwhile, Michaelangelo won't stop playing a video game, much to the other Turtles' annoyance.
129	3	"Super Irma"	David Wise	October 3, 1992	9062-9203
On Halloween, Irma gets super-magnetic powers and starts to fight crime. She decides to stop Krang's plan. When her powers wear off, the Turtles foil Krang and rescue Irma.
130	4	"Adventures in Turtle-Sitting"	Jack Mendelsohn and Carole Mendelsohn	October 24, 1992	9062-9204
Michaelangelo accidentally turns Leonardo, Raphael and Donatello into 5-year olds with Donatello's "Food Revivafier" (a machine that turns old and rotten food fresh again), while Splinter is out. Note: Title is a spoof of Adventures in Babysitting.
131	5	"Sword of Yurikawa"	Marc Handler	October 17, 1992	9062-9205
A mystery ninja steals a powerful sword that belonged to his old ninja master in order to test the Turtles' ninja spirits. The sword is also targeted by Shredder, Krang, and millionaire/international weapons collector Lafayette Le Drone.
132	6	"Return of the Turtleoid"	David Wise	September 26, 1992	9062-9206
The Turtles' Turtleoid friend Kerma is hunted down by a destroyer because of a glitch in its sensors. The destroyer was supposed to hunt down a space pirate named Nerma, but the glitch made it come out "Kerma". The Turtles also have to contend with Shredder, Krang, and Big Louie.
133	7	"Shreeka's Revenge"	Jack Mendelsohn and Carole Mendelsohn	October 10, 1992	9062-9207
A vain, galactic outlaw named Shreeka is after her power ring that Krang took from her. The problem is that April O'Neil now has the ring.
134	8	"Too Hot to Handle"	Jack Mendelsohn and Carole Mendelsohn	October 3, 1992	9062-9208
A machine invented and used by Professor Filo Sopho is causing the Earth to move closer to the Sun. Vernon's incredibly smart nephew Foster helps the Turtles on their adventure to save the Earth and defeat Professor Sopho.
135	9	"Nightmare in the Lair"	Dennis O'Flaherty	October 17, 1992	9062-9209
Donatello's newest invention, the "Dream-o-Vision" helmet, causes Michaelangelo and Leonardo to be stuck in a nightmare world, while the lair is being terrorized by a Freddy Krueger-like person named Creepy Eddie.
136	10	"Phantom of the Sewers"	David Wise	October 24, 1992	9062-9210
The Turtles help a man with a discolored face named Bogart Flywheel stop a bank robbery orchestrated by Rufus Higby who also owns Willy Wombat's Pizza Pan Theatre. Higby was the one that threw something that discolored Bogart's face. After Higby was arrested, the Turtles see Bogar's face and discover that he was actually hit by paint that dried off which the Turtles get off with a quick wash.
137	11	"Donatello Trashes Slash"	David Wise	October 10, 1992	9062-9211
When an alien ray makes him a super-genius, Slash returns to Earth, bent on turning the entire population of New York City into mutant turtles like him, with the intention of turning the whole world into mutant turtles so he can become the 'One Supreme Turtle', leaving Donatello to fend him off in a battle of smarts.
138	12	"Leonardo is Missing"	David Wise	September 19, 1992	9062-9214
Leonardo gets lost and Raphael, Donatello and Michaelangelo must find him while Splinter is training. Meanwhile, after hearing about Leonardo's disappearance, Shredder and Krang use the Holographic Cloaking Machine on Bebop to make him look like the missing turtle, and have him cause trouble to ruin the turtles' reputation.
139	13	"Snakes Alive!"	David Wise	October 31, 1992	9062-9216
The Turtles try to solve a missing snake mystery, but Leonardo is afraid of snakes. A scientist named Dr. Rudolph Cobrato had a snake venom lab accident that turned into a snake tries to turn the city into a swamp.
140	14	"Polly Wanna Pizza"	Jack Mendelsohn	October 31, 1992	9062-9213
Michaelangelo buys a parrot and names him Ditto, although the bird really belongs to a criminal named Mugsy McGuffin who is after a rare key around Dido's neck because the Gulubi Ruby, the gem the thief stole, is in a vault that only the key can open.
141	15	"Mr. Nice Guy"	Steve Granat and Cydne Clark	November 7, 1992	9062-9215
Donatello's "Personality Alterator" turns Raphael too nice to fight. A mad scientist named Otto von Shrink uses it to turn every police office too nice so his robots X-2 and X-12 can steal money and jewels.
142	16	"Sleuth on the Loose"	Matt Uitz	November 7, 1992	9062-9212
April's aunt Agatha Marbles helps the Turtles stop a mad scientist named Vilmutt von Volt and his henchmen Garth and Knuckles from building a doomsday device.
