= Take me to your leader (phrase) =

Graham's original cartoon

"Take me to your leader" is a science-fiction cartoon catchphrase, said by an extraterrestrial alien who has just landed on Earth in a spacecraft to the first human they happen to meet. In cartoons, the theme is frequently varied for comic effect, such as a pun on the phrase to suit the setting, or the alien addressing an animal or object they assume is an intelligent earthling.

Writing in 1893, British captain William T. Wawn described the phrase in the context of Europeans trading with indigenous peoples in the South Pacific. Its usage in an extraterrestrial context is believed to have originated in a 1953 cartoon by Alex Graham in The New Yorker magazine. The cartoon depicted two aliens telling a horse "Kindly take us to your President!"

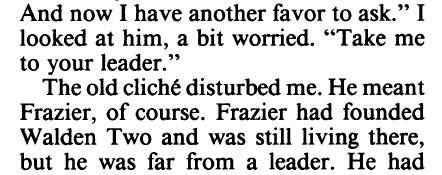
Already an old cliche in 1984. BF Skinner imagining George Orwell

By May 1957, when the Mr. Zero episode of the Adventures of Superman aired, the phrase was already a popular cliché.

== In science fiction ==
The phrase is also frequently used in parody science-fiction media. Notable examples of its use include:

- "If it's not too much of a cliché, take me to your leader. If it is too much of a cliché, take me anyway."

(Luke Skywalker, in Luke Skywalker and the Shadows of Mindor (2008))

- The phrase is used in a message to Jodie Foster's character in Robert Zemeckis's 1997 film Contact.
- "I want you to do something for me", she said, and unexpectedly laughed. "I want," she said, and laughed again. She put her hand over her mouth and said with a straight face, "I want you to take me to your leader."

(from Life, the Universe and Everything (1982) by Douglas Adams, describing Trillian addressing the inhabitants of Krikkit)

- Numerous uses on the BBC television series Doctor Who (1963—present), usually spoken by the Doctor in a tongue-in-cheek or annoyed manner
- In the 2018 Bumblebee film, one of the Decepticons quotes the phrase after requesting to use human technology to look for the Autobot Bumblebee.
- Titles of songs, albums, and other works - see Take Me to Your Leader
- In Protector by Larry Niven, Jack Brennan, after transforming into a protector, jokingly tells his finders "Take me to your leader" when they think he is an alien.
- In the series premiere episode of Star Trek: Strange New Worlds (2022), during a covert mission to an uncontacted alien planet, Captain Pike (Anson Mount) is forced to reveal himself to the locals, and he wryly uses this line. He is indeed taken to meet the planetary leader.
- In the series Agents of S.H.I.E.L.D. Agent Phil Coulson says the phrase when he is captured.
