= Dance from Cuba =

Performing arts from Cuba

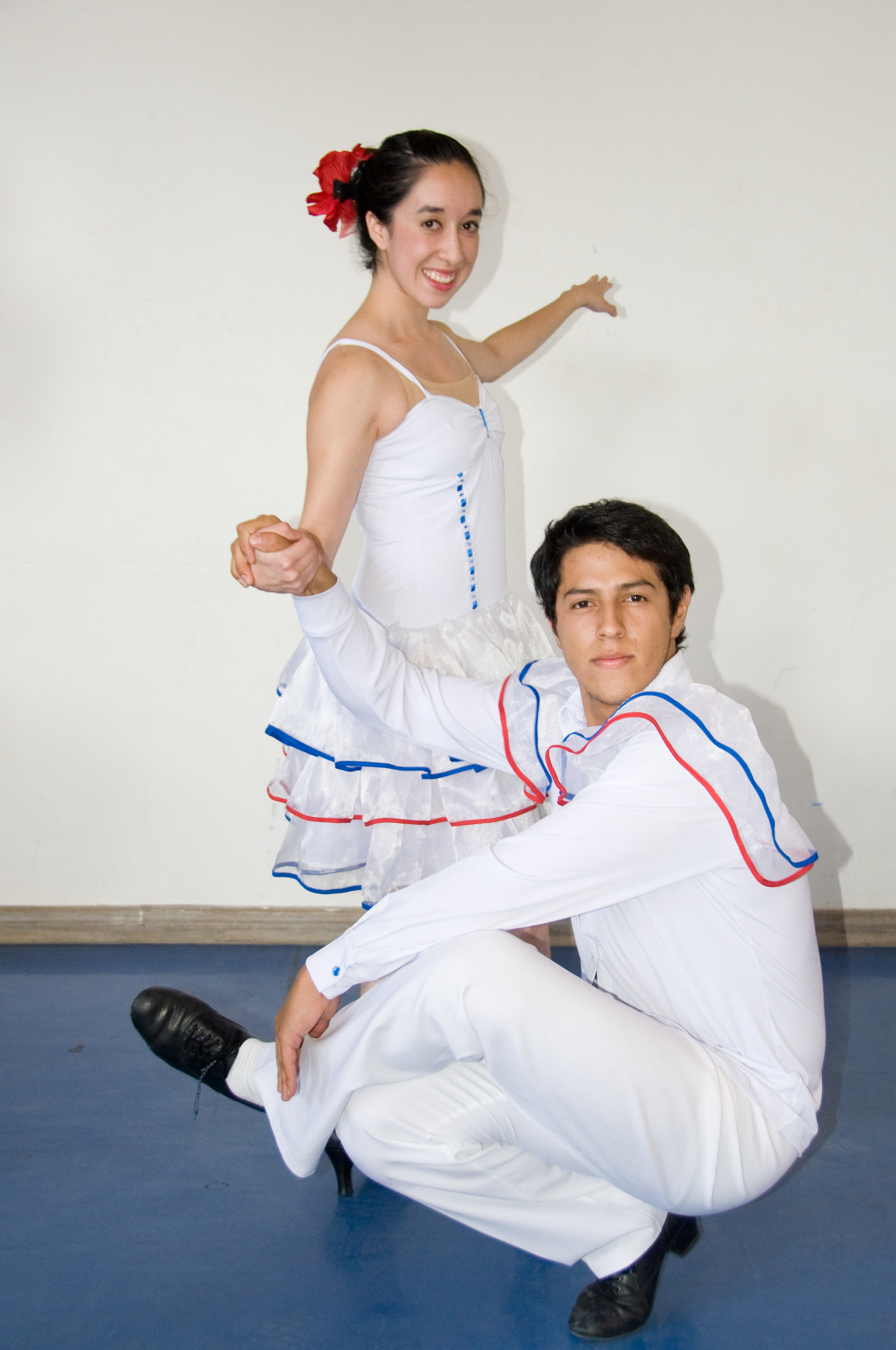
Cuban style dancers from Monterrey, Mexico City.

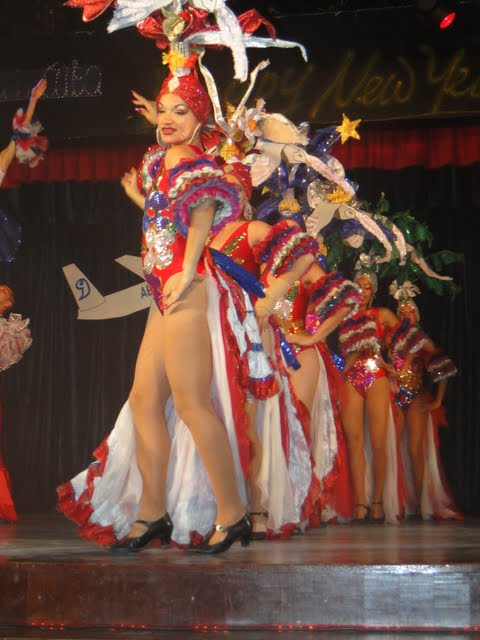
Cuban dance performance in Guardalavaca.

Cuban culture encompasses a wide range of dance forms. The island's indigenous people performed rituals known as areíto, which included dancing, although little information is known about such ceremonies. After the colonization of Cuba by the Spanish Kingdom, European dance forms were introduced such as the French contredanse, which gave rise to the Cuban contradanza. Contradanza itself spawned a series of ballroom dances between the 19th and 20th centuries, including the danzón, mambo and cha-cha-cha. Rural dances of European origin, such as the zapateo and styles associated with punto guajiro also became established by the 19th century, and in the 20th century son became very popular. In addition, numerous dance traditions were brought by black slaves from West Africa and the Congo Basin, giving rise to religious dances such as Santería, yuka and abakuá, as well as secular forms such as rumba. Many of these dance elements from European dance and religious dances were fused together to form the basis of la técnica cubana. Cuban music also contributed to the emergence of Latin dance styles in the United States, namely rhumba (ballroom rumba) and salsa.

== Dance styles ==
=== Danzón ===
Danzón is the official musical genre and dance of Cuba. It is also an active musical form in Mexico and is still beloved in Puerto Rico. The danzón evolved from the Cuban contradanza (also known as the habanera). In Cuba, these dances were influenced by African rhythmic and dance styles and so became a genuine fusion of European and African influences.

The danzón developed in 1879, and has been an important root for Cuban music up to today. Its precursor is the habanera, which is a creolized Cuban dance form. The danzón was developed, according to one's point of view, by either Manuel Saumell or Miguel Faílde in Matanzas.

The form of danzón created by Miguel Faílde in 1879 ("Las alturas de Simpson"), begins with an introduction (four bars) and paseo (four bars), which are repeated and followed by a 16-bar melody. The introduction and paseo again repeat before a second melody is played. The dancers do not dance during these sections: they choose partners, stroll onto the dance floor, and begin to dance at precisely the same moment: the fourth beat of bar four of the paseo, which has a distinctive percussion pattern that is hard to miss. When the introduction is repeated the dancers stop, chat, flirt, greet their friends, and start again, right on time as the paseo finishes.

Early danzón was played by groups called orquestas típicas, which were based on wind instruments. They had several brass instruments (cornet, valve trombone, ophicleide), a clarinet or two, a violin or two and tympani (kettle drums). At the beginning of the 20th century, the lighter and somewhat more elegant sound of the charanga emerged (see Early Cuban bands). Initially, they were small orchestra of two violins, a cello, flute, timbales, güiro, and doublebass. Charanga and típicas competed with each other for years, but after 1930 it was clear that the days of the típica were over.

=== Mambo ===
Mambo is a musical form and dance style that developed originally in Cuba, with further significant developments by Cuban musicians in Mexico and the USA. The word "mambo" means "conversation with the gods" in Kikongo, the language spoken by Kongo slaves taken to Cuba. Modern mambo began with a song called "Mambo" written in 1938 by brothers Orestes and Cachao López. The song was a danzón, a dance form descended from European social dances like the English country dance, French contredanse, and Spanish contradanza. It was backed by rhythms derived from African folk music.

=== Cha-cha-cha ===
The cha-cha-cha, or simply cha-cha, is the name of a dance of Cuban origin. It is danced to the music of the same name introduced by Cuban composer and violinist Enrique Jorrín in 1953. This rhythm was developed from the danzón by a syncopation of the fourth beat. The name is onomatopoeic, derived from the rhythm of the güiro (scraper) and the shuffling of the dancers' feet.

Styles of cha-cha-cha dance may differ in the place of the chasse in the rhythmical structure. The original Cuban and the ballroom cha-cha-cha count is "two, three, chachacha" or "four-and-one, two, three". The dance does not start on the first beat of a bar, though it can start with a transfer of weight to the lead's right.

Nevertheless, many social dancers count "one, two, cha-cha-cha" and may find it difficult to make the adjustment to the "correct" timing of the dance.

=== Bolero ===
The Cuban bolero dance originated in Santiago de Cuba in the last quarter of the 19th century; it does not owe its origin to the Spanish music and song of the same name. In the 19th century there grew up in Santiago de Cuba a group of itinerant musicians who moved around earning their living by singing and playing the guitar.

Pepe Sánchez is known as the father of the trova style and the creator of the Cuban bolero. Untrained, but with remarkable natural talent, he composed numbers in his head and never wrote them down. As a result, most of these numbers are now lost, but two dozen or so survive because friends and disciples wrote them down. He was the model and teacher for the great trovadores who followed.

The Cuban bolero has traveled to Mexico and the rest of Latin America after itsconception, where it became part of their repertoires. Some of the bolero's leading composers have come from nearby countries, most especially the prolific Puerto Rican composer Rafael Hernández; another example is Mexico's Agustín Lara. Some Cuban composers of the bolero are listed under Trova.

=== Salsa ===
Salsa dancing originated in Cuba and Cuban salsa is danced around the world. It evolved from earlier dance forms such as Cha cha cha and Mambo which were popular in New York, and incorporated elements of Swing dancing and Hustle, as well as elements of Afro-Cuban and Afro-Caribbean dances such as Guaguanco and Pachanga. In many styles of salsa dancing, as a dancer changes weight by stepping, the upper body remains level and nearly unaffected by the weight changes. Weight shifts cause the hips to move. Arm and shoulder movements are also incorporated. The Cuban Casino style of salsa dancing involves significant movement above the waist, with up-and-down shoulder movements and shifting of the ribcage.

The arms are used by the "lead" dancer to communicate or signal the "follower," either in "open" or "closed" position. The open position requires the two dancers to hold one or both hands, especially for moves that involve turns, putting arms behind the back, or moving around each other, to name a few examples. In the closed position, the leader puts the right hand on the follower's back, while the follower puts the left hand on the leader's shoulder.

=== Ballet ===
Cuba has ballet schools across the country. The Cuban National Ballet School (Escuela Nacional Cubana de Ballet) in Havana, with approximately 3,000 students is the biggest ballet school in the world and the most prestigious ballet school in Cuba. It is directed by Ramona de Sáa. The Cuban National Ballet is also a renowned ballet company located in Havana. Today a government subsidized preprofessional ballet school operates in each of Cuba's fifteen provinces.

== See also ==
- Music of Cuba
- Culture of Cuba
