= Heavy Metal 2000 =

2000 Canadian film

- DVD cover
- Directed by: Michael Coldewey; Michel Lemire
- Screenplay by: Robert P. Cabeen; Carl Macek
- Based on: The Melting Pot by: Kevin Eastman; Simon Bisley; Eric Talbot
- Produced by: Jacques Pettigrew; Michel Lemire
- Starring: Michael Ironside; Julie Strain; Billy Idol
- Cinematography: Bruno Philip
- Edited by: Brigitte Brault
- Music by: Frederic Talgorn
- Production company: CinéGroupe
- Distributed by: Columbia Tristar Home Video
- Release date: July 10, 2000
- Running time: 88 minutes
- Countries: Canada; Germany; United States
- Language: English
- Budget: $15 million

Heavy Metal 2000, also known as Heavy Metal: F.A.K.K.² outside North America, is a 2000 Canadian-American direct-to-video adult animated science fantasy film produced by Jacques Pettigrew and Michel Lemire, and directed by Michael Coldewey and Lemire. Starring the voices of Michael Ironside, Julie Strain, and Billy Idol, the film is the follow-up to the 1981 animated cult film Heavy Metal, which is based on the fantasy magazine of the same name. The story is based on the graphic novel, The Melting Pot, written by Kevin Eastman, Simon Bisley and Eric Talbot. The film was made by CinéGroupe, a studio based in Montreal, Quebec. It received generally negative reviews from critics.

== Plot ==
In ages past, the Arakacians, a malevolent race, discovered a place where spacetime leaked a type of fluid. This fluid granted immortality to anyone who consumed it. The Arakacians built an empire and enslaved the known universe for centuries. They were finally vanquished after the fountain chamber, where they gathered the water of life, was sealed by freedom fighters. The key to the chamber, a glowing green crystal (resembling the "Loc-Nar" from the original Heavy Metal) that can lead the bearer back to the fountain and drives anyone who possesses it insane, was cast into space and lost among the stars.

In a present-day asteroid excavation, space crewman Tyler and his colleague find the key by accident. Tyler touches the key and instantly goes insane, growing long hair and looking fierce. He kills his mining partner and takes over the ship, killing everyone but Dr. Schechter, and the pilots Lambert and Germain. His search for the planet with the fountain leads to Eden. This planet is designated F.A.K.K.² (Federation-Assigned Ketogenic Killzone to the second level), but has inhabitants whose bodies carry traces of the immortality fluid. Tyler invades Eden and kills many of the Edenites, capturing some so he can extract the immortality fluids from their bodies. He also keeps the attractive schoolteacher Kerrie for his sexual purposes. When Germain resists the idea, he is left on Eden.

Kerrie's warrior sister Julie survives the attack and teams up with Germain to follow Tyler, though brutally fending off Germain's flirtations. At a renegade space station, where a sex robot distracts Germain, Julie finds Tyler in a nightclub and critically injures him. However, he ingests a vial with the immortality serum and heals instantly. In the ensuing gunfight, Tyler blows up the club. Escaping the explosion, Julie and Germain board a shuttlecraft that latches onto Tyler's ship before it jumps into hyperspace. Discovering them mid-travel, Tyler tries to shake them off, but the fight causes the two ships to crash.

Julie wakes up on Uroboris, a desert planet, and meets Odin, a mysterious cloaked sage, and his assistant, Zeek, a rock-like creature who appeared when Tyler found the crystal. The two are guardians of the ancient fountain. With his ship destroyed and most of his crew dead, Tyler orders Dr. Schechter to extract Kerrie's fluids. While exploring the planet, he finds a race of reptilian beings and conquers them by defeating their champion and their leader in a death match. Julie enters the reptilian city disguised as a woman whom the reptiles found for Tyler. That night, she seduces Tyler and tries to kill him, but Zeek stops the attempt and captures her, taking her back to Odin. Julie then infiltrates Tyler's ship and discovers Kerrie is still alive. She takes out Dr. Schechter, frees Kerrie, and escapes as the complex explodes. Tyler, with only three vials of serum left, orders his troops to storm the citadel where the immortality fountain is located.

At the citadel, Julie undergoes a bath ritual where armor of scanty clothing, like Taarna's in Heavy Metal, is bestowed upon her. She, Kerrie, and Germain help the fountain's guardians defend against Tyler's army. In the fighting, Lambert suffers a near-fatal injury and grabs for Tyler's last vial of immortality serum, accidentally breaking it on the ground. Tyler, enraged, kills Lambert for the blunder and walks to the pit of immortality. He is about to put the crystal into the fountain's final lock, but is stopped by Julie, who stabs him in the left eye. A fight ensues in which, with Odin's help, Julie finally kills Tyler. Odin then throws off his cloak, revealing himself to be the last of the Arakacians. He has been in hiding all these centuries, waiting for someone to find the chamber key and be drawn to the fountain. He intends to claim it as his own and reestablish the Arakacian empire. However, Zeek, who befriended Julie, pulls the crystal key from the pedestal, locking Odin inside the fountain chamber forever, and flies into outer space. As Germain and Kerrie help Julie to her feet, Zeek envelops the crystal into himself and becomes a new asteroid to hide the key for all time.

== Cast ==
- Julie Strain as Julie; the on-screen character was also based on Strain's likeness
- Michael Ironside as Tyler
- Billy Idol as Odin
- Pierre Kohl as Germain St. Germain
- Sonja Ball as Kerrie
- Brady Moffatt as Lambert
- Rick Jones as Zeek
- Arthur Holden as Dr. Schechter
- Terry Scammell as Chartog

== Production ==
=== Kevin Eastman's acquisition of Heavy Metal magazine ===
In 1991, after selling Tundra Publishing to Kitchen Sink Press, Kevin Eastman bought Heavy Metal magazine and formally adopted the role of owner, publisher, and editor-in-chief of the magazine. Upon taking on the role, one of Eastman's first tasks was extracting the 1981 adult animated Heavy Metal anthology film from legal limbo and get it re-released as the original produers' shortsightedness during the advent of home video, believing it would be a passing fad, meant music licensing for the film's soundtrack was not secured which proved to be so much of a legal headache that Columbia TriStar decided not to bother with a home video release. While the film could not be released on home video, it was aired frequently on HBO and Cinemax throughout the 1980s and 1990s. It was often bootlegged by fans. Eastman spent five years and a significant amount of his own money to help untangle the music licensing conflicts and allow the film to be re-released. His efforts included lobbying executives at Columbia Pictures, who reluctantly agreed to help re-release the movie just to stop receiving phone calls and visits from Eastman. The film was re-released to 54 theaters on March 8, 1996 followed by an official release on VHS and LaserDisc on June 4, 1996 including restored footage of the three-minute sequence titled "Neverwhere Land," by animator Cornelius Cole III originally cut from the film for pacing reasons. The re-release of Heavy Metal on home video proved to be a major hit selling over two million copies. Because of the success of the film on home video this led to Columbia offering to collaborate on a follow-up film with Eastman.

=== Development ===
(left) Model/actress Julie Strain posing as the character of F.A.K.K. 2 for promotional shoot (right) Kevin Eastman pin-up art for the 20th anniversary issue of Heavy Metal (Vol. 11 #2) featuring Strain's likeness as F.A.K.K. 2

In 1995, Eastman and his then wife Julie Strain were writing a script at the time known as Heavy Metal II. It had an anticipated $20 million budget and the possible final titles of Heavy Metal Presents:Fakk-II or Heavy Metal Overdrive. Like its predecessor, the film was intended to be an anthology film. The sequel would feature a sword and sorcery heroine known as Fakk-II who would appear in every segment as Eastman felt there was a lack of character growth and development present in the original film. He thought having a recurring character in the segments would address that issue. Comic book artist Simon Bisley helped to design Fakk-II with Eastman and Strain with Strain not only serving as a reference model, but also helping to design Fakk-II's battle gear for appearance in the comic, film, and live-appearances at conventions. The production planned to farm out animation to Canadian, Korean, and Japanese animation houses as well as Eastman's partially owned computer animation studio Limelight Productions which produced ReBoot. In addition to co-writing the film with Eastman, Strain also served as the model for Fakk-II's likeness and was positioned to voice the character. In describing the character of Fakk-II, Eastman stated:

If you can imagine Sigourney Weaver as a Terminator-like character, but with a strong human side, that's Fakk-II. It’s not a cyborg. She's made out of flesh and bone, it's more the attitude of the character. You have this character with this great heart, and soul, and mission that sort of takes over her life.

Eastman had developed Fakk-II for an unrelated story several years earlier. The story ultimately never panned out as he could not create a compelling emotional core for the character. Eastman credited Julie Strain with her contributions that helped find the character's human side. Development continued on the film, now under the title of Heavy Metal F.A.K.K. II, through April of 1997 with the film having dropped the anthology aspect of its predecessor in favor adapting Eastman's The Melting Pot focusing solely on the conflict between Fakk-II and her nemesis Lord Tyler. While the project had momentum thanks to the successful home video re-release of the first Heavy Metal, Eastman and Strain faced a challenge in looking for prospective animation houses in France and Germany as they were looking to use computer animation to recreate the 2D style of the origin film in a new 3D style that would differentiate it from Disney animation style or "Japanimation". By July of that year, Eastman was in active negotiations with Columbia seeking to both produce and direct the film.

=== Start of production ===
In July 1998, it was announced German distributor Helkon Media would be co-producing a sequel to Heavy Metal with Columbia Pictures tentatively titled Heavy Metal 2. By October of that year, it was announced CinéGroupe would be co-producing the Heavy Metal follow-up under the new title of F.A.K.K.2. In March 1999, it was reported Billy Idol would voice one of the characters for the film now titled Heavy Metal: F.A.K.K. 2 which would be based upon the graphic novel The Melting Pot by Kevin Eastman, Simon Bisley and Eric Talbot. In April 2000, it was reported that Starz! Pictures would premiere the film on Starz on Friday, July 14 at midnight ET/PT with subsequent airings throughout the month. The film was announced to have been written by Robert Payne Cabeen and Carl Macek under Eastman's supervision with Michael Coldewey serving as director who had previously co-directed the German animated musical The Fearless Four.

Regarding why he did the movie, Kevin Eastman stated:

I always wanted to do an epic heroic adventure with a strong female lead. One that is thriving in a backdrop that combines the desperation of Road Warrior, the intensity of Aliens, the visual feel of Blade Runner, and the magnitude of Akira Kurosawa’s Ran, Heavy Metal 2000 captures all that and more. The film combines classic 2D-cel animation with advanced 3D-computer animation, and an extraordinary original soundtrack featuring some of the biggest names in hard rock. It’s intense, full of action and very fast paced.

By October 1999, it was reported the film had entered post-production.

== Reception ==
On review aggregator website Rotten Tomatoes, the film has an 8% rating based on reviews from 12 critics. Lisa Nesselson of Variety called the plot derivative but said self-selecting audiences may enjoy it. Writing for Slant Magazine, Jake Cole said, "Everything here is disconnected and enervating, scuttling the winsome absurdity of the premise."

== Home media release ==
Following its premiere at the World Animation Celebration, Heavy Metal 2000 was released on July 10, 2000 followed by a home video release on October 17, 2000 on VHS and DVD at a price of $14.99 and $24.99 respectively. It was later released on Blu-ray on April 19, 2022, while Heavy Metal was released on Ultra HD Blu-ray on the same day.

== Video game ==
The film spawned a video game about the events after Heavy Metal 2000, titled Heavy Metal: F.A.K.K. 2, in which the player assumes the role of Julie as she fights to save Eden from an evil entity called "GITH". The game is set some time after the film and features cameo appearances of several characters, for example, Julie's sister Kerrie, the pilot Germaine (now married to Kerrie), and a resurrected Tyler. Unlike the movie, the game was generally received favorably.

== Possible sequel ==
After the release of 2000, a third film went through various stages of development. During 2008 and into 2009, reports circulated that David Fincher and James Cameron would executive produce, and each direct one of the eight to nine segments for a new film based on Heavy Metal. Eastman would also direct a segment, as well as animator Tim Miller, with Zack Snyder, Gore Verbinski, and Guillermo del Toro attached to direct segments. However, Paramount Pictures decided to stop funding the film by August 2009 and no distributor or production company has shown interest in the second sequel since.

In 2011, filmmaker Robert Rodriguez announced at Comic-Con that he had purchased the film rights to Heavy Metal and planned to develop a new animated film at the new Quick Draw Studios. However, on March 11, 2014, with the formation of his very own television network, El Rey, Rodriguez considered switching gears and bringing it to TV.

Fincher and Miller subsequently developed their plans into Love, Death & Robots, an original animated series for Netflix initially released in 2019.

== Soundtrack ==
Heavy Metal 2000 OST

Soundtrack album by Various artists
- Released: April 18, 2000
- Genre: Heavy metal
- Length: 73:47
- Label: Restless

Heavy Metal film soundtracks chronology
Heavy Metal OST (1981)	Heavy Metal 2000 OST (2000)

Heavy Metal 2000

The Heavy Metal 2000 Original Soundtrack is the 2000 soundtrack album to the film of the same name. In his AllMusic review, Greg Prato said that the album was a "truer heavy metal soundtrack" than that of the first film, featuring a combination of established bands such as Pantera, Monster Magnet, and Machine Head; then-newer bands such as Queens of the Stone Age, System of a Down, Hate Dept., Puya, and Coal Chamber; and a few non-metal artists such as Billy Idol, Insane Clown Posse, Twiztid, and Bauhaus. The vast majority of the tracks were either specifically recorded for the soundtrack or were previously unreleased up to that point. One month after its release in the U.S., the soundtrack peaked at No. 101 on the Billboard 200 chart.

No.	Title	Writer(s)	Producer(s)	Length
1.	"F.A.K.K. U"	Joseph Bishara; Bruce Berman; Todd Osenbough	Joe Bishara; Bruce Berman; Bill Kennedy	1:44
2.	"Silver Future" (Monster Magnet)	Dave Wyndorf	Bob Ezrin	4:29
3.	"Missing Time" (MDFMK)	Sascha Konietzko; Tim Skold	MDFMK	4:35
4.	"Immortally Insane" (Pantera)	Pantera	Vinnie Paul; Dimebag Darrell; Sterling Winfield^{[a]}	5:11
5.	"Inside the Pervert Mound" (Zilch)	Hide; Ray McVeigh	Bill Kennedy; Paul Raven	4:07
6.	"The Dirt Ball" (Insane Clown Posse with Twiztid)	Joseph Bruce	Mike E. Clark	5:33
7.	"Störagéd" (System of a Down)	Daron Malakian^{[d]}; Serj Tankian^{[c]}	Rick Rubin; System of a Down	1:17
8.	"Rough Day" (Days of the New)	Travis Meeks	Bruce Berman; Travis Meeks^{[a]}	3:18
9.	"Psychosexy" (Sinisstar)	Bob Marlette; Newton Kirk Martin	Bob Marlette	4:02
10.	"Infinity" (Queens of the Stone Age)	Joshua Homme	Chris Goss; Joshua Homme	4:40
11.	"Alcoholocaust" (Machine Head)	Robert Flynn^{[c]}^{[d]}; Ahrue Luster^{[d]}; Dave McClain^{[d]}; Adam Duce^{[d]}	Ross Robinson	3:38
12.	"Green Iron Fist" (Full Devil Jacket)	Josh Brown; Full Devil Jacket	Malcolm Springer	3:51
13.	"Hit Back" (Hate Dept.)	Steven Seibold	Steven Seibold; Bob Ezrin^{[b]}	3:52
14.	"Tirale" (Puya)	Harold Hopkins Miranda^{[c]}^{[d]}; Ramon Ortiz^{[d]}	Gustavo Santaolalla; Anibal Kerpal^{[e]}	5:34
15.	"Dystopia" (Apartment 26)	Terence Butler; Louis Cruden; Jon Greasley; Andy Huckvale	Doug Firley; Apartment 26	2:56
16.	"Buried Alive" (Billy Idol)	Billy Idol; Steve Stevens; Mark Schulman; Bridget Benenate; Trevor Hurst^{[c]}; Bob Ezrin	Bob Ezrin	5:10
17.	"Wishes" (Coal Chamber)	B. Dez Fafara^{[c]}^{[d]}; Miguel Rascón^{[d]}; Rayna Foss-Rose^{[d]}; Mike "Bug" Cox^{[d]}	Josh Abraham	3:06
18.	"The Dog's a Vapour" (Bauhaus)	Bauhaus	Bob Ezrin; Bauhaus	6:44

Notes

- ^{^[a]} signifies a co-producer
- ^{^[b]} signifies an additional producer
- ^{^[c]} signifies a lyricist
- ^{^[d]} signifies a music composer
- ^{^[e]} signifies an associate producer

Additional tracks:

(These were used in the film, but were not included in the official soundtrack for unknown reasons.)

1. "Apparition" by Coal Chamber — 2:28
2. "Hate Me" by Sons of Domination — 2:24
3. "Ion" by Voivod — 4:32
4. "You Don't Know What It's Like" by Econoline Crush — 4:02
