= Early Cuban bands =

Early Cuban bands played popular music for dances and theatres during the period 1780–1930. During this period Cuban music became creolized, and its European and African origins gradually changed to become genuinely Cuban. Instrumentation and music continually developed during this period. The information listed here is in date order, and comes from whatever records survive to the present day.

== Típicas ==
For about a hundred years, from early in the nineteenth century to about 1920, the main orchestral format for popular music was the típica based on wind instruments, usually about 8–10 members. At the same time, there were also itinerant musicians, duos and trios: for them, see trova.

=== Orquesta Concha de Oro ===
Founded early in the 19th century by the black violinist and double bass player Claudio Brindis de Salas, it played the dance music of the epoch at the balls of the island's aristocracy: contradanzas, minuets, rigadoons, quadrilles, lancers. It was basically a típica, or wind orchestra, which was sometimes augmented to 100 players for special occasions such as fiestas.

Brindis de Salas, a disciple of maestro Ignacio Calvo, was also a composer of creole danzas and the author of an operetta, Congojas matrimoniales. In 1844 his musical career was interrupted by his involvement in the Escalera Conspiracy, for which whites were absolved, but blacks paid dearly. Brindis de Salas was arrested and tortured. He was banished from the island by the Governor, O'Donnell. Returning in 1848, he was imprisoned for two years, and when he eventually was free to think about reorganizing his band, he found out that most of them had been executed.

Apart from the operetta, he is known for a melody dedicated to the General Concha, printed in 1854. His son, Claudio Brindis de Salas Garrido (Havana, 4 August 1852 – Buenos Aires, 1 June 1911) was an even better violinist, of world renown.

=== Orquesta Flor de Cuba ===
Founded by clarinetist Juan de Dios Alfonso, who moved to Havana, where he played clarinet in Feliciano Ramos's band La Unión in 1856, and directed La Almendares in 1859. It is not quite clear when he formed La Flor de Cuba, which became one of the most popular in the middle of the 19th century. They played contradanzas, and other dances of the time. The orchestra was a típica, with cornet, trombone, ophicleide, two clarinets, two violins, double bass, kettle drum, and güíro. The ophicleide (ophicleide) was a sort of bass bugle with keys, invented in 1817; the t-bone would be a valve trombone.

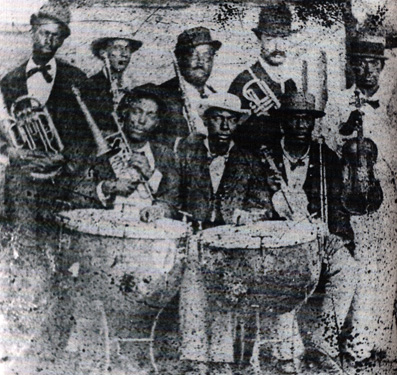
Orq. La Flor de Cuba, possibly the earliest surviving photograph of a Cuban popular band)

They were playing in the Teatro Villanueva in Havana in 1869 when the Spanish Voluntarios attacked the theatre, killing some ten or so patrons who had been watching a bufo (musical satirical comedy), and applauding its revolutionary sentiments. The context was that the Ten Years' War had started the previous year, when Carlos Manuel de Céspedes had freed his slaves, and declared Cuban independence. Creole sentiments were running high, and the Colonial government and their rich Spanish traders were reacting. Not for the first time, politics and music were closely intertwined, for musicians had been integrated since before 1800, and "from 1800 to 1840, blacks were the clear majority of the professional musicians". Bufo theatres were shut down for some years after this tragic event.

=== Orquesta Valenzuela ===
The descendant of La Flor de Cuba, led from 1877 by trombonist Raimundo Valenzuela after the death of Juan de Dios Alfonso. We do not know exactly when the name of the orchestra was changed. When Raimundo died in 1905, his brother Pablo became Director. It was, like Flor de Cuba, the most popular típica of its day.

Under cornetist Pablo Valenzuela, the band became one of the earliest to record Cuban music, in 1906 with Edison cylinders (about 40), 1909 with Columbia Records (23) and with Victor (56). The last recordings were in 1919; there were about 120 numbers in all, most of which were danzones. The band dispersed after his death.

=== Orquesta Faílde ===
Founded 1871 in Matanzas by Miguel Faílde, the official originator of the danzón. His band was composed mainly of wind instruments, and therefore was a típica. Its initial members were: Miguel Faílde (cornet); Pascual Carreras (ophicleide); Pancho Morales (1st violin); Juan Cantero (2nd violin); Anselmo 'Frijolín' Casalín (1st clarinet); Eduardo Faílde (brother, 2nd clarinet); Cándido Faílde (brother, trombone); Eulogio Garrido (double bass); Andrés Segovia (timpani); Isidro Acosta (güíro).

The usual changes in personnel meant that by 1903 the personnel included Eduardo Betancourt (trombone); Alfredo Hernández (2nd violin); Magdaleno Rodríguez (2nd clarinet) and Benito 'Chacho' Oliva (tympani).

This is the band which played the Alturas de Simpson, the first danzón; it was one of Faílde's compositions. It seems the band made no recordings, and it dispersed in 1921 after the death of its leader.

=== Orquesta Alemán ===
Founded 1878 in Santiago de Las Vegas. Leader: José Alemán (Guanabacoa, 22 December 1846 – Santiago de Las Vegas, 1924).

Alemán was a tailor's cutter in Santiago de Las Vegas and a composer of dance and religious music. He studied music under Pedro Álvarez, and became a double bass player, also a good violinist and pianist. He played double bass in the orchestra of Havana Cathedral, and in the orchestra of Juan de Dios Alfonso.

Orquesta Alemán was a típica or band based on wind instruments. It included Alejo Carillo (cornet); Pedro Espinosa (trombone); Leobino Zayas (ophicleide); Julián Allende (1st clarinet); Ramón Alemán (2nd clarinet); Elias Fuentes (1st violin); Juan Tómas Alemán (2nd violin); Aniceto Rodrígues (timpanist); Quirino Sastre (güíro).

On the death of José Alemán in 1924, the orchestra was directed by his brother Ramón, and there were numerous changes of personnel. The band was active until the 1930s.

=== Orquesta de Perico Rojas ===
Típica formed in 1884 by the trombonist Pedro Rojas (aka 'Perico'), in Güines. Its members at the start of the 20th century included the following: Perico Rojas (trombone); Patricio Valdés and Andrés Rojas (violin); Martín Caraballo and Miguel Rojas (clarinet); Jesús Urfé (cornet); Ambrosio Marín (trombone); Anacleto Larrondo (ophicleide); Juan R. Landa (double bass); Pedro Hernández (tympani); Leopoldo Castillo (güíro). The band lasted to early in the 20th century.

=== Orquesta típica de Felipe Valdés ===
All that is known of Felipe Valdés is that he was a cornetist and composer, who was born in Bolondrón, Matanzas, in the second half of the 19th century. He founded his típica in 1899, and it became popular in Havana. Its instrumentation in 1916 was: 3 violins; 2 clarinets; cornet; trombone; double bass; saxophone; güíro and timbales. Probably it had started with an ophicleide, and later substituted the saxophone. They included a piano by 1929.

The group recorded more danzones than any other before 1920. They recorded for Edison (1906), Columbia (starting 1906/7); Victor (starting 1907). The total number of recordings was 315 numbers. Valdés composed many numbers, including La Africana, Lamentos and Yeyé Olube. Some of these recordings are available on CD: four numbers from 1907 (Victor), one from 1916 (Columbia) and one from 1929. Díaz Ayala said, "It's incredible that there is no more information about this director who composed and recorded so many danzones."

=== Orquesta de Enrique Peña ===
Cornetist Enrique Peña's danzonera was one of the first to record, and that profusely. This was the second band he organized (the first was called La Juventud): the line-up was: Peña (cornet); Antonio González (trombone); Féliz González (ophicleide); José Belén Puig (1st clarinet); José Urfé (2nd clarinet); Julián Barreto (violin); Alfredo Sáenz (violin); José de los Reyes (tympani); Rufino Cárdenas (güíro) and unknown (double bass).

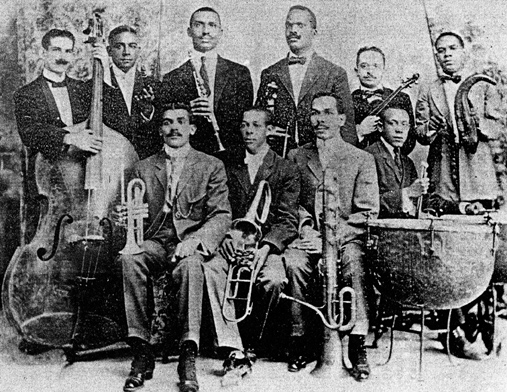
Orquesta Enrique Peña

The orchestra started to record in 1908, and became famous for El bombín de Barreto (Barreto's bowler hat), written by Urfé, which was supposedly the first danzón to incorporate a syncopated third part, influenced by the son. Several members of the band went on to become well-known later on. The group recorded about 150 numbers, some of which are available on CD.

=== Orquesta de Félix González ===
This, one of the last típicos to be founded, started in 1915 with a core of members from Enrique Peña's band. The setup was: González (ophicleide), Dolores Betancourt (t-bone); José Belén Puig (first clarinet); José Urfé (second clarinet); Miguel Ángel Mendieta and Benito Moya (violins); Guillermo Maherve (d. bass); Demetrio Pacheco (tympani) and Ulpiano Díaz (güiro). Despite its old-fashioned format, the orchestra kept in work for 52 years, until the death of its Director in 1967. Three of its recordings are available on CD, from 1916, 1925 and 1928.

== Charangas ==
Charangas supplanted the típica as the standard instrumental line-up for the danzón. Initially called charangas francesas (though they have nothing to do with France), they were 'invented' at the start of the 20th century. The formulation is still going strong, with appropriate adjustments to the instrumentation. The basic idea is to pitch the tone of the orchestra higher and brighter than the típica, by removing the brass, replacing the clarinet with a flute and replacing the kettle drums with a new invention, the pailas criollas, now called timbales. This metal-cased drum, hit with timbales sticks, and not timpani sticks, produces a distinctive effect. The two timbales drums are pitched differently, and may be supplemented with two timbalitos, pitched even higher, and one or two cencerros (cowbells). Also noteworthy is the use of the sticks on the metal casing to produce a rhythm known as the cascara. From early on these bands also included a piano. The overall effect is to produce a lighter, brighter flavor to the music; who actually originated the idea is not known.

=== Orquesta Torroella ===
Founded at the end of the 19th century in Havana, this was the first charanga francesa in the capital, and the first to include a piano.

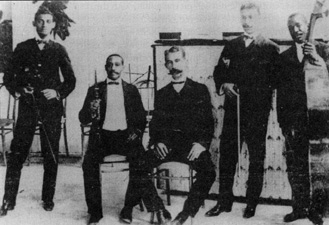
Papaito Torroella and his band

Its director was the pianist Antonio 'Papaito' Torroella, and from the start the band included Papaito Torroella (piano); David Rendón (violin); Faustino Valdés (flute) and Evaristo Romero (double bass). Under the title Sexteto Torroella, the group recorded eight numbers on Edison cylinders in 1906.

=== Orquesta de Tata Alfonso ===
A charanga francesa formed early in the 20th century by flautist Octavio 'Tata' Alfonso. Its line-up at its peak was: Tata Alfonso (flute); Bruno Quijarro (violin); Pablo Bequé (double bass); Jesús Lopéz (piano); Abelardo Valdés (güiro); Ulpiano Díaz (timbales). The band recorded six numbers for Columbia Records in 1918, and was regarded as one of the three most important charangas in the history of the danzón, and the first to incorporate melodies from the cantos de claves y guaguancó in this genre.

=== Orquesta Romeu ===
Founded around 1910 by Antonio María Romeu (1876–1955), this was for thirty years the most important charanga in Cuba. Romeu had previously played in Orquesta Cervantes, one of several charangas founded at the beginning of the 1900s, and became one of the most prolific composers of danzones. The orchestra recorded hundreds of numbers over many years, beginning in 1915, and issued a whole series of albums after 1950. It is not clear that Romeu was, as sometimes claimed, the originator of the charanga, but it is clear that his band was for many years the leading danzonera.

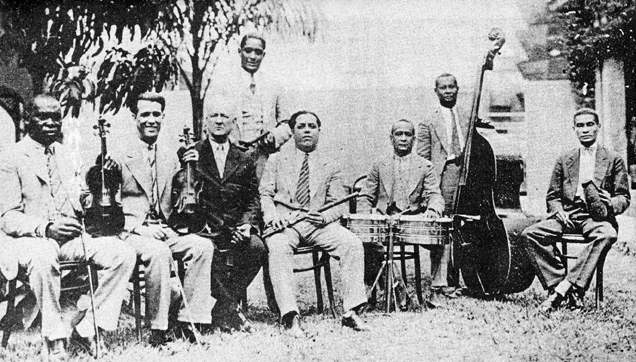
Orquesta Romeu with singer Fernando Collazo, late 1920s

The initial line-up for Orchestra Romeu was: Romeu (piano); Feliciano Facenda (violin); Alfredo Valdés (flute); Rafael Calazán (double bass); Remigio Valdés (timbal); Juan de la Merced (güiro): quite a small group.

Much later the orchestra included Francisco Delabart (flute); Augusto Valdés (clarinet); Juan Quevedo (violin); Aurelio Valdés and Félix Vásquez (güiro); Antonio Ma. Romeu (son, violin); Pedro Hernández (violin); Dihigo (trumpet); Regueira (trombone) and José Antonio Díaz (flute). The singers (introduced after the introduction of the sung danzón, known as the danzonete) were, at two different times, Fernando Collazo and Barbarito Díez. In the thirties it had become a big band, and included two brass instruments.

When Romeu died, the orchestra was led for a while by his son, also Antonio María Romeu, then by Barbarito Díez. It still played the traditional danzón, but now was called the Orquesta de Barbarito Díez.

== Son groups ==
The son dates back to the latter part of the 19th century. Actual names of players and musical groups appear after the then Cuban President, José Miguel Gómez, sent the battalions of the Ejército Permanente away from their native provinces. It was the Permanente from Oriente that brought the son to Havana.

There are a few early recordings which survive from before the famous sextetos were formed. Some of the theatre music was interesting, for example, the Teatro Alhambra had a group of which Adolfo Colombo was the leading personality. He was a singer and regular recording artist, though few of these recordings have survived. One that has been reissued by Harlequin reveals a funky number which is hard to categorize. Listed as a rumba, it is perhaps best described as a guaracha-son. The artists singing are Colombo and Claudio García, the guitar probably Alberto Villalón, plus an unknown tres player. All three named players were white, yet the number is creole, almost Afro-Cuban, in style.

=== Sexteto Boloña ===
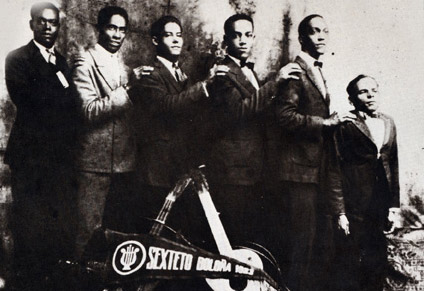
Sexteto Boloña 1926. L>R in photograph: José Vega Chacón (guitar, 2nd voice), unknown (maracas, 1st voice), José Manuel Incharte 'El Chino' (bongó), Abelardo Barroso (sonero, claves), 'Tabito' (double bass), Alfredo Boloña (tres, leader).

In 1915 Alfredo Boloña Jimenez formed a son group in Havana. He played the marimbula, the bongó and the guitar at different times and, despite his physical limitations (dwarfism), he was a force in Cuban music for half a century. His first group was Hortensia Valerón (vocalist), Manuel Menocal (tres), Manuel Corona (guitar), Victoriano Lopéz (maracas) and Joaquín Velasquéz (bongó).

In October 1926, the Sexteto Boloña recorded in New York City a set of numbers for Columbia which is available today on the usual media.

The group split up in 1934.

=== Sexteto Habanero ===
In 1917 four musicians calling themselves Cuarteto Oriental recorded four numbers for Columbia in Havana. The numbers are listed in a Columbia catalog for 1921, but are probably lost. However, the same group expanded to a sextet in 1918, and were recorded by Victor in a field recording at the Hotel Inglaterra in Havana. At least one of these records has survived, giving two numbers, which are probably the first surviving sones. The new grouping called itself Sexteto Habanero in 1920.

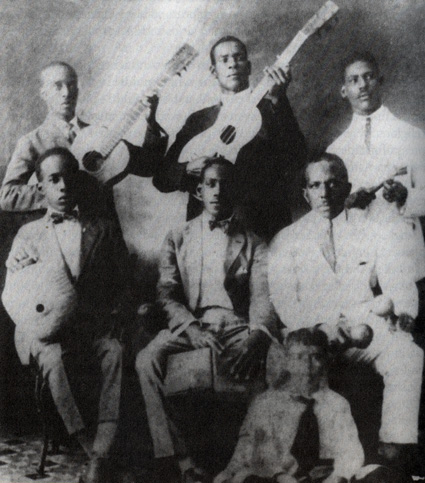
Sexteto Habanero 1920. Its line-up was: back, L>R: Guillermo Castillo (guitar and director), Carlos Godínez (tres), Gerardo Martínez (voz prima y claves); front, L>R: Antonio Bacallao (botija), Oscar Sotolongo (square bongó) and Felipe Nerí Cabrera (maracas).

The instrumental setup is interesting, because they use some of the original instruments of the son: the botija and a unique square bongó. Soon this (and other) groups appreciated that the double bass was a musically more suitable instrument: they never went back to the botija. Five years later, the group had new members and a different look, including Agustín Gutierrez (bongó), Abelardo Barroso (sonero, claves), Felipe Nerí Cabrera (maracas, vocals); Gerardo Martínez (double bass, vocals, leader); Guillermo Castillo (guitar, vocals), Carlos Godínez (tres, vocals).

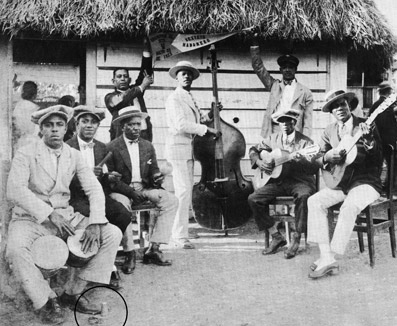
Sexteto Habanero 1925, with bongosero's lamp circled

The group's recordings in New York 1925-26 are available on LP and CD. The music is of high quality, considering the technical limitations of the time; the group won first prize in the Concurso de Sones in 1925 and 1926. When the group added a cornet, soon replaced by a trumpet, namely Félix Chappottín, it became the Septeto Habanero. This latter line-up lasted until the late 1930s, when sextetos were ousted by conjuntos and big bands. The leader, Gerardo Martínez then formed a new group, Conjunto Típico Habanero.

=== Sexteto Occidente ===
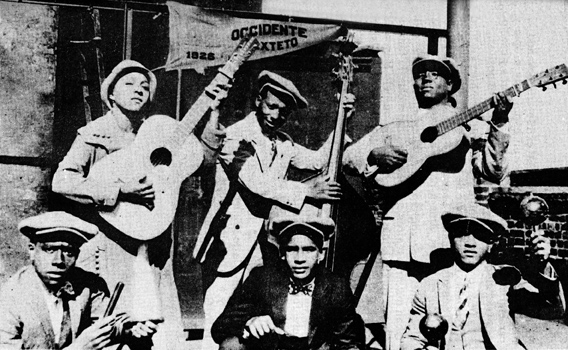
Sexteto Occidente, New York 1926. Back row: Maria Teresa Vera (guitar), Ignacio Piñeiro (double bass), Julio Torres Biart (tres). Front row: Miguelito Garcia (clavé), Manuel Reinoso (bongó) and Francisco Sánchez (maracas).

One of the early son sextetos, formed in 1925 by María Teresa Vera and Miguel García, it went to New York and recorded numbers, but lasted only about 18 months. Its setup was typical of the early son groups.

== Other types ==
=== Orquesta Avilés ===
The group with the longest continuous record, it was founded in 1882 and still in existence. Manuel Avilés Lozano (Holguín, Oriente, 2 February 1864 – ?) worked as a tailor, and studied music under the Spanish maestro Magín Torres. Avilés, director and clarinetist, formed the orchestra with relatives and other musicians, and, eventually, his thirteen children. Later still, he engaged other younger relatives. He and some of the other band members fought in the Cuban War of Independence in the Ejército Libertador.

The band is unusual in several respects. It started as a típico, then became a charanga, then became (in the 1940s) what Cubans call a 'jazzband', meaning a big band. The band has always been based in Holguín, and scarcely ever left Oriente. It is still organized around family members. It is now called Orquesta Hermanos Avilés.

=== Estudiantina Oriental ===
This group developed in Santiago de Cuba at the end of the 19th century. It was significantly different from the típicas, both in music, instruments and racial composition (the members were usually white). The genres of music played included danzón, bolero, son and guaracha. The instruments included tres, marimbula, kettle drums or pailas criolla (timbales). This instrumental line-up prefigures that of the sextetos which appeared later, rather than the older típicas. The members would be based on university students, probably reinforced by talent from other quarters. Similar Estudiantina groups were formed in other provincial towns.

Giro gives this setup as characteristic of Estudientinas: two tres, 1st and 2nd; two guitars; one trumpet; botija or double bass; paila (timbal); cencerro (cow-bell); güiro; three singers, 1st, 2nd and falsetto, and maybe both sexes. It is clear that estudientinas in different parts of Cuba had variations in membership, instruments and repertoire.

=== Cuban jazz bands ===
The history of jazz in Cuba was hidden for many years by the unwillingness of record companies to make recordings available. However, in recent years, it has become clear that its history in Cuba is as long as its history in the USA. The key figure in revealing the early days of Cuban jazz is Leonardo Acosta, musician and musicologist, who has been working on this topic for many years. Others have explored the history of jazz and Latin jazz from the U.S. perspective. The pre-history of Cuban jazz includes musicians like Louis Moreau Gottschalk and W.C. Handy, who visited Cuba and brought creole ideas into their music.

The Jazz Band Sagua was founded in Sagua la Grande in 1914 by Pedro Stacholy (director & piano). Members: Hipólito Herrera (trumpet); Norberto Fabelo (cornet); Ernesto Ribalta (flute & sax); Humberto Domínguez (violin); Luciano Galindo (trombone); Antonio Temprano (tuba); Tomás Medina (drum kit); Marino Rojo (güiro). For fourteen years they played at the Teatro Principal de Sagua. Stacholy studied under Antonio Fabré in Sagua, and completed his studies in New York, where he stayed for three years.

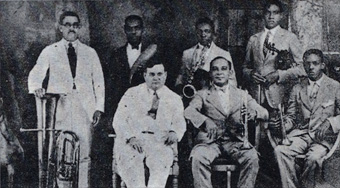
Jazz Band Sagua 1920s

The Cuban Jazz Band was founded in 1922 by Jaime Prats in Havana. The personnel included his son Rodrigo Prats on violin, the great flautist Alberto Socarrás on flute and saxophone and Pucho Jiménez on slide trombone. The line-up would probably have included double bass, kit drum, banjo, cornet at least. Earlier works cited this as the first jazz band in Cuba, but evidently there were earlier groups.

In 1924 Moisés Simons (piano) founded a group which played on the roof garden of the Plaza Hotel in Havana, and consisted of piano, violin, two saxes, banjo, double bass, drums and timbales. Its members included Virgilio Diego (violin); Alberto Socarrás (alto sax, flute); José Ramón Betancourt (tenor sax); Pablo O'Farrill (d. bass). In 1928, still at the same venue, Simons hired Julio Cueva, a famous trumpeter, and Enrique Santiesteban, a future media star, as vocalist and drummer. These were top instrumentalists, attracted by top fees of $8 a day.

All these bands no doubt played Cuban music as well as jazz, but there are few recordings of them playing jazz. There can be little doubt that these early ventures built up a stock of Cuban musicians that were at home with both genres. That led eventually to the Latin jazz fusions of later years.
