= Areito (disambiguation) =

The areíto was a performance and ceremony of the Taíno people of the Caribbean.

Areíto, areito or areyto may also refer to:

- Areíto (album), an album by Juan Luis Guerra
- Areito (record label), a Cuban record label
- Areyto (EP), an EP by Puya
