= Puya =

Puya may refer to:

- Puya (plant), in the family Bromeliaceae
- Puya (river), in Russia
- Puya, a variety of Guajillo chili
- Puya (Meitei texts), traditional or mythological texts of the Meetei people
- Culoepuya or Culo'e Puya, Venezuelan drums of Congolese origin
- Puya (band), a progressive metal band from Puerto Rico
  - Puya (album), a 1995 album by the band
- Puya (rapper), a Romanian rapper from the hip-hop, rap group La Familia
