= Areyto (EP) =

EP by Puya
- Released: 2010
- Recorded: Seattle, Washington and San Juan, Puerto Rico
- Length: 22:25

Puya chronology
Union (2001)	Areyto (2010)	Vital (2014)

Areyto is the first EP by Puerto Rican progressive metal band Puya, released digitally in 2010.

== Background ==
Puya disbanded in 2002 while several members worked on their own projects. Guitarist Ramon Ortiz played with Ankla, a band based in Los Angeles, bassist Harold Hopkins Miranda played in Yeva out of Puerto Rico, Ed Paniagua toured as a drummer with various solo artists, while Sergio Curbelo went back to school for graphic computer arts in Miami. Areyto is the band's first release since 2001

== Track listing ==
1. "Ni Antes Ni Despues" (Ramon Ortiz) - 4:21
2. "No Hay Mal Que Por Bien No Venga" (Ortiz) - 4:34
3. "Areyto" (Harold Hopkins)- 3:51
4. "La Muralla" (feat. Tito Auger, Tego Calderón, Mimi Maura & El Topo) - 5:36
5. "Hecho El Resto" (Ortiz, Hopkins) - 4:03
