= Ramon Ortiz (disambiguation) =

Ramón Ortiz is a Major League Baseball pitcher.

Ramon Ortiz may also refer to:

- Ramon Ortiz (musician), guitar player for the band Puya
- Ramón Ortiz y Miera, priest, founder of Basilica of San Albino

== See also ==
- Juan Ramon Ortiz
