= Raimundo Valenzuela =

Cuban trombonist and composer (1848–1905)

Raimundo Valenzuela de Leon (23 January 1848 in San Antonio de los Baños – 27 April 1905 in Havana) was a leading Cuban trombonist, composer and bandleader.

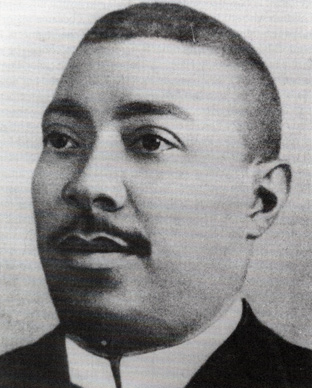
Raimundo Valenzuela

== Life and career ==
Valenzuela studied music under his father, Lucas: he learnt piano, viola, percussion, but was first employed by Orquesta Flor de Cuba as a trombonist. He was playing for La Flor in the Alhambra theatre in Havana in 1869, when a group of Spanish anti-revolutionary volunteers attacked the theatre and its patrons. That night the theatre had been performing anti-colonial works for the benefit of rebels declaring Cuban independence, in what became known as the Ten Years' War.

He established his band from the remains of Flor de Cuba after the death of its leader, Juan de Dios Alfonso. Like its forebear, the orchestra was a típica in format, based mostly on wind instruments. It was, like Flor de Cuba, the most popular típica of its day. Valenzuela's bands played everywhere in Havana. They played for balls, the theatre, carnavals, and for all racial groups and all levels of society.

Raimundo contributed financially and personally to the development of the Cuban War of Independence in 1895. When Raimundo died in 1905, his brother Pablo Valenzuela became Director of the orchestra.

Valenzuela's compositions were mostly danzones, such as El negro bueno, María Belen, Los empleados de Tacón; and the zarzuela La mulata María.

== The era of danzón ==
The danzón developed first in Matanzas and Havana. The second phase of its evolution had been started by Miguel Faílde, who was a close friend of Valenzuela. Faíde's was the top band in Matanzas, as Valenzuela was in Havana. They often played together on big occasions. In 1883, for example, there was a double bill at the Teatro Tacón, where the two bands played alternatively all night. It was in 1883 that Valenzuela added a third segment to the two-part structure created by Faílde, so completing the danzón's musical form. By the mid-1880s the danzón had become so popular that both Faílde and Valenzuela created back-up bands so as to be able to play two venues on the same night.

During carnaval, danzón dancing became a 'kind of delirium'; in 1893 no fewer than 150 dances were announced for Havana's carnaval. "In Havana it is a scandal taking on more alarming proportions every day." Especially targeted for criticism were the cheap dance-halls called escuelitas. New dances have often drawn criticism, particularly when members of different races danced together. As early as 1879 we find "This dirty rhythm forced the dancers into obscene movements" "First we had the danza, then came the danzón... next it will be the rumba, and finally we'll all end up dancing ñáñigo!"
