= Juan de Dios Alfonso =

Cuban composer, musician

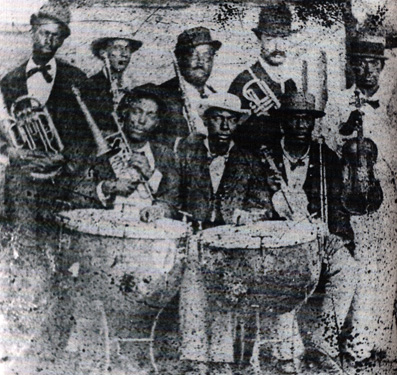
Orquesta La Flor de Cuba

Juan de Dios Alfonso Armenteros (San José de Las Lajas, 1825 – Guanabacoa, 29 June 1877), was a black Cuban band leader, composer and clarinetist. He founded the small orchestra Flor de Cuba, which played at dances and in theatres in the middle 19th century in Havana.

In Havana, Alfonso played clarinet in Feliciano Ramos's band La Unión in 1856, and directed Las Almendares in 1859. It is not known precisely when he formed La Flor de Cuba, but it must have been in the 1860s. It became one of the most popular bands in the middle to late 19th century. They played contradanzas, and other dances of the time. The orchestra was a típica in format, based mainly on wind instruments.

== Background ==
Flor de Cuba also played in musical theatre to zarzuelas and bufos. Cuban Bufo theatre was a form of comedy, ribald and satirical, with stock figures imitating types that might be found anywhere. They contained a musical form, guarachas, with spicy lyrics on current events and personalities.

The band was playing in the Teatro Villanueva in Havana in 1869 when the Spanish Voluntarios attacked the theatre, killing some ten or so patrons who had been watching a bufo and applauding its revolutionary sentiments. The context was that the Ten Years' War had started the previous year, when Carlos Manuel de Céspedes had freed his slaves, and declared Cuban independence. Creole sentiments were running high, and the Colonial government and their rich Spanish traders were reacting. Not for the first time, politics and music were closely intertwined, for musicians had been integrated since before 1800, and "from 1800 to 1840, blacks were the clear majority of the professional musicians". Bufo theatres were shut down for some years after this event.

Orquesta Flor de Cuba continued until its leader's death, when it was taken over by one of its long-term members, Raimundo Valenzuela.

== See also ==
- Early Cuban bands
