= Puya (album) =

1995 studio album by Puya

Studio album by Puya
- Released: July 22, 1995
- Recorded: Fall 1994–spring 1995, studios at Miami, New Jersey
- Length: 37:55
- Label: Noiz Boiz

Puya chronology
| Puya (1995) | Fundamental (1999) |

Professional ratings
Review scores
| Source | Rating |
|---|---|
| Billboard | (favorable) |

Puya is the self-titled debut album of the Puerto Rican progressive metal band of the same name, released in 1995 by the Pompano Beach, Florida independent record label Noiz Boiz.

== Background ==
Puya formed in Puerto Rico as a progressive rock combo under the name Whisker Biscuit in 1991. Upon relocating to Florida, the band changed its name to Puya, after a popular type of coffee.

The band's self-titled debut album was released in 1995 by Noiz Boiz Records. A subsequent Billboard review identified the band as being unsigned as of 1996. The band's lineup on this album consisted of guitarist Ramon Ortiz and bassist Harold Hopkins Miranda. Following the release of the album, Sergio Curbelo became the band's lead singer in 1996.

== Reception ==
The album received favorable notice from Billboard which described the band as "unpredictably compelling", and the song "Bembele" as containing "amazing leaps from percolating Afro-Caribbean rock to crunching thrash to syncopated blues-laced rock"

== Track listing ==
1. "Bembelé" 3:44
2. "Aguaje" 1:54
3. "Down" 2:45
4. "Siguelo Pa Llá" 2:47
5. "Unión" 3:04
6. "F.Y.F.A." 1:41
7. "No Te Rajes" 2:43
8. "Chisme" 3:06
9. "Deficiente" 3:01
10. "Contamination" 2:35
11. "Quién Sufre Más" 3:14
12. "Paco" 4:24
13. "Puya" 2:57

== Personnel ==
Puya

- Ramon Ortiz – guitars, cuatro
- Harold Hopkins Miranda – bass guitar, vocals

Additional musicians

- Sergio Curbelo - lead vocals, cabasa
- Eguie Castrillo - percussion
- Jeff Watkins - saxophone
- Mike Smart - saxophone
- Tyrone Jefferson - trombone
- Todd Owens (trumpet on track 2)
