= The Melting Pot (comics) =

1995 graphic novel

- Publisher: Kitchen Sink Press

Creative team
- Writers: Kevin Eastman; Eric Talbot
- Artists: Kevin Eastman; Simon Bisley

The Melting Pot is a fantasy graphic novel by Kevin Eastman, Simon Bisley and Eric Talbot. Eastman and Talbot collaborated on the story, while Eastman and Bisley worked together on the painted artwork.

The series spent several years in development, with advertisements promoting its release appearing in Mirage Studios books from as far back as 1986. It was eventually serialized in four issues released in 1993 and 1994 by Kitchen Sink Press. A 144-page paperback volume collecting the series with a foreword by Mike Allred followed in 1995.

In November 2007, a new 170-page version of the story was published as a special edition of Heavy Metal magazine. The 2007 version is substantially different from the original series, with an expanded, more coherent narrative and new artwork by Eastman, Bisley, and Rob Prior.

== Development ==
Kevin Eastman began developing the concept and premise for what would become The Melting Pot in 1986 with various colleagues and concept languishing in development hell until Eastman abandoned the concept in 1993 citing frustration with inability to find a workable emotional core for the main character. Eastman credited his then wife Julie Strain with her contributions that helped define the character, Zarharr (later known as Fakk II for Heavy Metal 2000), on a human level with Comic book artist Simon Bisley helping to design Zarharr with Eastman and Strain. Strain not only served as a reference model; she also helped design Zarharr's battle gear for appearances in the comic, film, and live-appearances at conventions.

== Adaptations ==
Key characters and other elements of the Melting Pot story became the basis for the direct-to-video animated film Heavy Metal 2000 in 2000.

== Publication ==
- Melting Pot: The Collection. (Kitchen Sink Press. 1995. ISBN 0-87816-362-X.

== See also ==
- 1995 in comics
