= Eric Talbot =

American comic book writer and artist

- Talbot at Dragon Con in 2026
- Areas: Writer, Penciller, Inker
- Notable works: Teenage Mutant Ninja Turtles
- www.erictalbotart.com

Eric Talbot is an American comic book writer and artist known for his work on the Teenage Mutant Ninja Turtles series under Mirage Studios. He was hired by long-time classmate and friend Kevin Eastman.

Talbot is a professional Tattoo artist working at Oxbow Tattoo in Easthampton MA

Talbot co-created the graphic novel The Melting Pot along with Kevin Eastman and Simon Bisley, which was used as the basis for the film Heavy Metal 2000.
