= San Antonio de los Baños Municipal Museum =

Museum in Cuba

- Museo Municipal de San Antonio de los Baños
- Established: 28 December 1980
- Location: San Antonio de los Baños, Cuba

San Antonio de los Baños Municipal Museum is a museum located in the 66th street in San Antonio de los Baños, Cuba. It was established on 28 December 1980.

The museum holds collections on history, weaponry, decorative arts, natural science and fine arts.

== See also ==
- List of museums in Cuba
