= Pablo Valenzuela =

Cuban musician and composer (1859–1926)

José Pablo Valenzuela García (2 March 1859 – 25 December 1926) was a leading Cuban cornetist, composer and bandleader.

García was born in San Antonio de los Baños. After taking his first lessons in music under his father Lucas, he moved to Havana. There he first joined the orchestra of Manuel Espinosa, before joining La Flor de Cuba, the leading band of the day. This had come under the direction of his brother Raimundo after the death of its founder, and at some stage the name was changed to Orquesta Valenzuela.

Raimundo died in his fifties in 1905, after which the band was under Pablo's direction. Now it was possible for Cuban bands to record their music, and the Orquesta Valenzuela was one of the earliest to take advantage of the opportunity: they recorded about 120 numbers. In 1906 there were 40 recordings on Edison cylinders; in 1909 23 numbers for Columbia Records, and 56 numbers with Victor Records. The last recordings were in 1919; there were about 120 numbers in all, most of which were danzones. Of his compositions, some became lasting hits: Coco seco, El congo libre, La frita, La niña, La Patti negra, María Teresa, El garrotín.

The band dispersed after Pablo died, aged 67, in Havana in 1926.
