= San Antonio de los Baños =

- Municipality
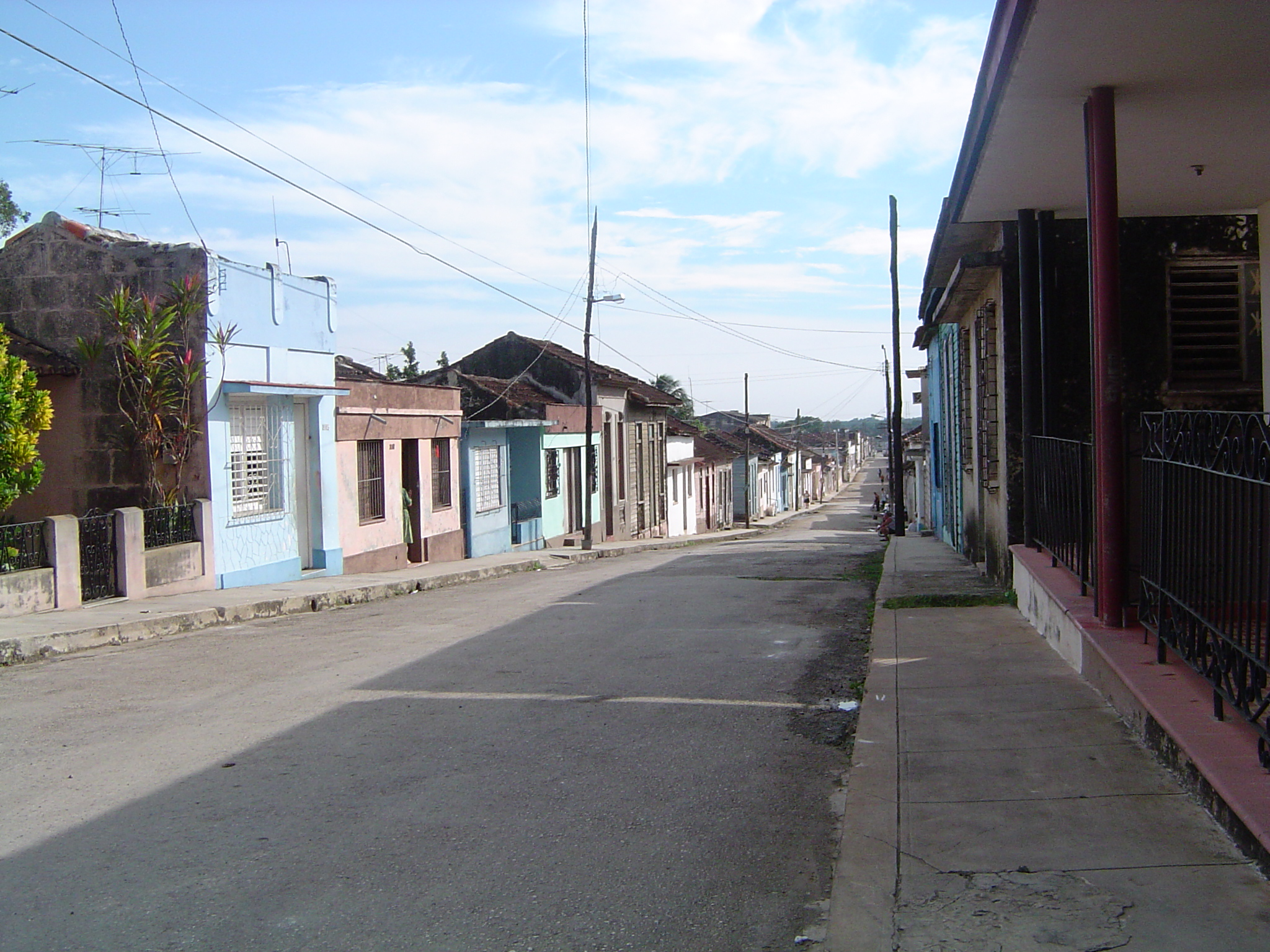

- Coat of arms

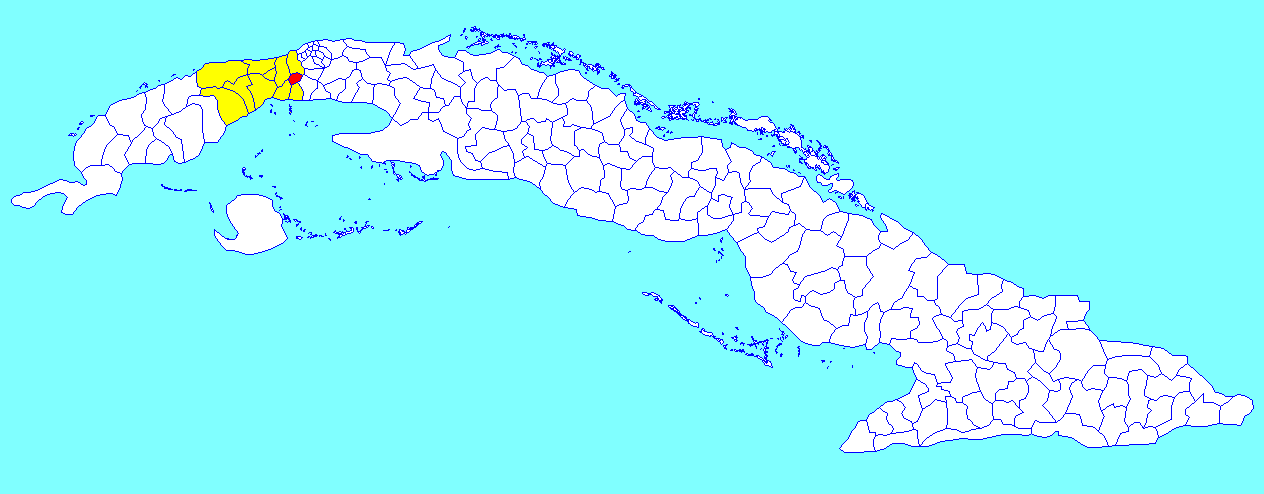
- San Antonio de los Baños municipality (red) within Artemisa Province (yellow) and Cuba
- Coordinates: 22°53′18″N 82°30′21″W
- Country: Cuba
- Province: Artemisa
- Founded: 1802
- Established: 1879 (Municipality)

Government
  - President: Bladimir Parada Rodríguez

Area
  - Total: 127 km^{2} (49 sq mi)
- Elevation: 60 m (200 ft)

Population (2022)
  - Total: 51,314
  - Density: 404/km^{2} (1,050/sq mi)
- Time zone: UTC-5 (EST)
- Area code: +53-47
- Climate: Aw

San Antonio de los Baños is a municipality and town in the Artemisa Province of Cuba. It is located 26 km from the city of Havana, and the Ariguanabo River runs through it. It was founded in 1802.

== History ==
There are 39 schools in the town, employing over 600 teachers. These schools include an academy of plastic arts, a school for training art teachers, and the International School of Cinema and Television Escuela Internacional de Cine y Televisión which was established in 1986. The town's library was founded in 1975, and has a collection of more than 32,000 books. There is also the San Antonio de los Baños Municipal Museum.

San Antonio de los Baños Airfield was inaugurated in September 1942. Initially operated by transport aircraft and bombers Douglas B-26 and Boeing B-29, which conducted training in the Caribbean, no aircraft that was part of Cuban aviation could land at the Military Base without prior authorization from the same authorities.

== Geography ==
The municipality is divided into the barrios of Este Urbano, Centro urbano and Oeste urbano as well as La Ceiba, Encrucijada, Mi Rancho, San Paul, Govea, Pueblo Textil, El Palenque and La Base.

=== Climate ===
Climate data for San Antonio de los Banos
Month	Jan	Feb	Mar	Apr	May	Jun	Jul	Aug	Sep	Oct	Nov	Dec	Year
Mean daily maximum °C (°F)	27 (80)	29 (84)	30 (86)	31 (88)	32 (89)	32 (90)	33 (92)	33 (92)	32 (90)	31 (87)	28 (83)	27 (80)	31 (87)
Mean daily minimum °C (°F)	16 (60)	17 (62)	18 (65)	20 (68)	21 (69)	22 (72)	22 (71)	22 (72)	22 (71)	21 (69)	18 (64)	16 (61)	19 (67)
Average precipitation cm (inches)	2.5 (1)	1.0 (0.4)	4.1 (1.6)	5.3 (2.1)	9.9 (3.9)	22 (8.7)	16 (6.2)	21 (8.4)	23 (9.1)	15 (5.9)	4.6 (1.8)	3.6 (1.4)	129 (50.7)
Source: Weatherbase

== Demographics ==
In 2022, the municipality of San Antonio de los Baños had a population of 51,314. With a total area of 127 km^{2} (49 sq mi), it has a population density of 400/km^{2} (1,000/sq mi).

== Notable people ==
- Eduardo Abela
- Blanquita Amaro
- Andarín Carvajal
- Silvio Rodríguez
- Agustin Roman
- Pablo Valenzuela
- Raimundo Valenzuela
- Mariano Vivanco Valiente
- Adrián Zabala

== Twin towns ==
- La Algaba (Andalusia, Spain)
- Jódar (Andalusia, Spain)
- Zapotlanejo (Jalisco, Mexico)

== See also ==
- Municipalities of Cuba
- List of cities in Cuba
- Autopista del Mediodía
