= De La Tierra =

Latin American metal band

- Origin: Argentina; Brazil; Mexico; Puerto Rico
- Genres: Alternative metal; groove metal
- Years active: 2012–present
- Label: Roadrunner
- Members: Andrés Giménez; Andreas Kisser; Harold Hopkins; Alex González
- Past members: Flavio Cianciarulo
- Website: delatierramusic.com

De La Tierra is a Latin American heavy metal supergroup formed in late 2012 by Brazilian guitarist Andreas Kisser (of Sepultura), Argentine singer and guitarist Andrés Giménez (of A.N.I.M.A.L.), Argentine bassist Sr. Flavio (of Los Fabulosos Cadillacs) and American-born Cuban-Colombian drummer Alex González (of Maná). Their self-titled debut album was released on 14 January 2014, through Roadrunner Records.

== History ==
The foundations of the group were laid down around 2005 towards the end of A.N.I.M.A.L.'s run when Andrés Giménez and Alex González began discussing the idea of forming a band together, eventually bringing in Sr. Flavio to play bass in 2011 and finalising the lineup in 2012 with the addition of Andreas Kisser on lead guitar. After self-producing their album in several locations across South America, the group signed to Roadrunner Records and released their debut single, Maldita Historia, on 30 September 2013. The album was released on 14 January 2014.

In 2016 the band released its second album, II. In 2017 Sr. Flavio left De La Tierra and was replaced by Puerto Rican bassist Harold Hopkins.

== Lineup ==
- Andrés Giménez – lead vocals, rhythm guitar (2012–present)
- Andreas Kisser – lead guitar, backing vocals, co-lead vocals in Portuguese (2012–present)
- Harold Hopkins – bass, backing vocals (2017–present)
- Alex González – drums (2012–present)

=== Former members ===
- Flavio Cianciarulo – bass, backing vocals, co-lead vocals in Spanish (2012–2017)

== Discography ==
Studio albums

- De La Tierra (2014)
- II (2016)
- III (2023)

Singles

- Maldita Historia (2013)
- San Asesino (2014)
