= Alfredo Boloña =

Cuban musician (1890–1964)

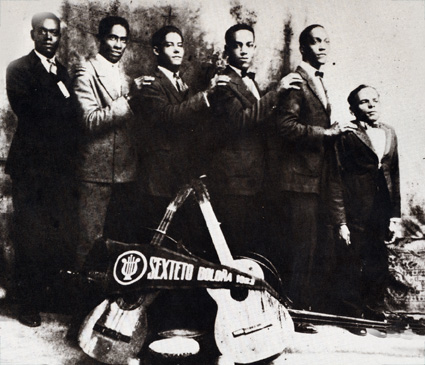
Sexteto Boloña in 1926. Left to right: José Vega Chacón (guitar, 2nd voice), unknown (maracas, 1st voice), José Manuel Incharte 'El Chino' (bongó), Abelardo Barroso (vocals, claves), 'Tabito' (double bass), Alfredo Boloña (tres, leader).

Alfredo Boloña Jiménez (December 24, 1890 – 1964) was a Cuban guitarist who played a role in the early development of the son as director of the Sexteto Boloña.

== Career ==
Boloña was born in Havana on December 24, 1890. Boloña played the marímbula, the bongó and the tres at different times and, despite his physical limitations (dwarfism), he was a force in Cuban music for half a century. In 1910 he was already a figure of note in Havana, a member of the Los Apaches choral group and of the Trío Oriental, with Guillermo Castillo (guitar) and Carlos Godínez (tres). In 1915 Boloña formed a son group in Havana called Agrupación Boloña, with Hortensia Valerón (vocalist), Manuel Menocal (tres), Manuel Corona (guitar), Victoriano Lopéz (maracas) and Joaquín Velásquez (bongó).

In October 1926 his Sexteto Boloña recorded in New York City a set of numbers for Columbia Records, which were made available on CD in the 1990s. The lineup in these recordings included prolific singer Abelardo Barroso. The group split up in 1935.

Boloña's compositions included "Güagüina yirabo", "Riquieza en flor", "A la permanente", "Aurora en Pekín", "Dame un besito" and "Te esperaré en la retreta".
