= Alberto Socarras =

Cuban-American flautist

- Born: 19 September 1908; Manzanillo, Cuba
- Died: 26 August 1987 (aged 78); New York City, United States
- Occupation: Flautist

Alberto Socarrás Estacio (19 September 1908 – 26 August 1987) was a Cuban-American flautist who played both Cuban music and jazz.

== Biography ==
Socarras was born in Manzanillo, Cuba, in 1908, and started learning the flute in 1915 with his mother, Dolores Estacio, and later joined the provincial music conservatory at Santiago de Cuba. He completed his studies at the Timothy Music Conservatory in New York, gaining the equivalent title to a doctorate in music. In the middle 1920s he moved to Havana to join the theatre orchestra of Arquimedes Pous, where his sister Estrella was playing the violin. He also played in one or two Early Cuban jazz bands, before moving to the United States in 1927.

In the US, he recorded with Clarence Williams in 1927 with his first flute solo taking place on "Shooting the Pistol" on the Paramount label that year, making Socarras the earliest known jazz flute soloist (earlier even than Wayman Carver). He played with The Blackbirds revue between 1928 and 1933, and plays on Lizzie Miles's 1928 recording "You're Such a Cruel Papa to Me". In 1933, he played with Benny Carter, then led the all-female Cuban band Anacaona on a tour of Europe in 1934. In 1935, he played with Sam Wooding and led his own bands from 1935 into the 1940s; his sidemen included Edgar Sampson and Mongo Santamaría, and Cab Calloway as a singer. Socarras also played with Erskine Hawkins in 1937.

In the 1950s, Socarras took part in Rod Serling's The Twilight Zone on TV, and offered concerts of cult music at the Carnegie Hall in New York. In the 1960s, he dedicated himself to teaching, but also made some recordings. In 1983, he was filmed by Gustavo Paredes playing the flute in a television documentary Música.

Socarras died aged 78 in New York City on 26 August 1987.

== Discography ==
He made his first recordings on 78s in 1927 as a sideman for various jazz artists, including Clarence Williams and Adelaide Hall. He made one recording session in 1935, with four numbers. He also recorded for RCA Victor in 1947 and SMC Pro-Arte ca. 1950. He recorded again in 1955, cutting Afro-Cuban versions of four Duke Ellington compositions. In 1959, he appeared on the exotic Tambo! LP by Tito Puente for RCA Victor.

=== Albums as leader ===
- Latin Impressions By Socarras (Decca, 1957)
- Cha Cha Chas and Mambos (Decca, 1959)
- Flute and Fiddles (Sesac Recordings, 1959)
