= Harold Hopkins Miranda =

Puerto Rican musician (born 1973)

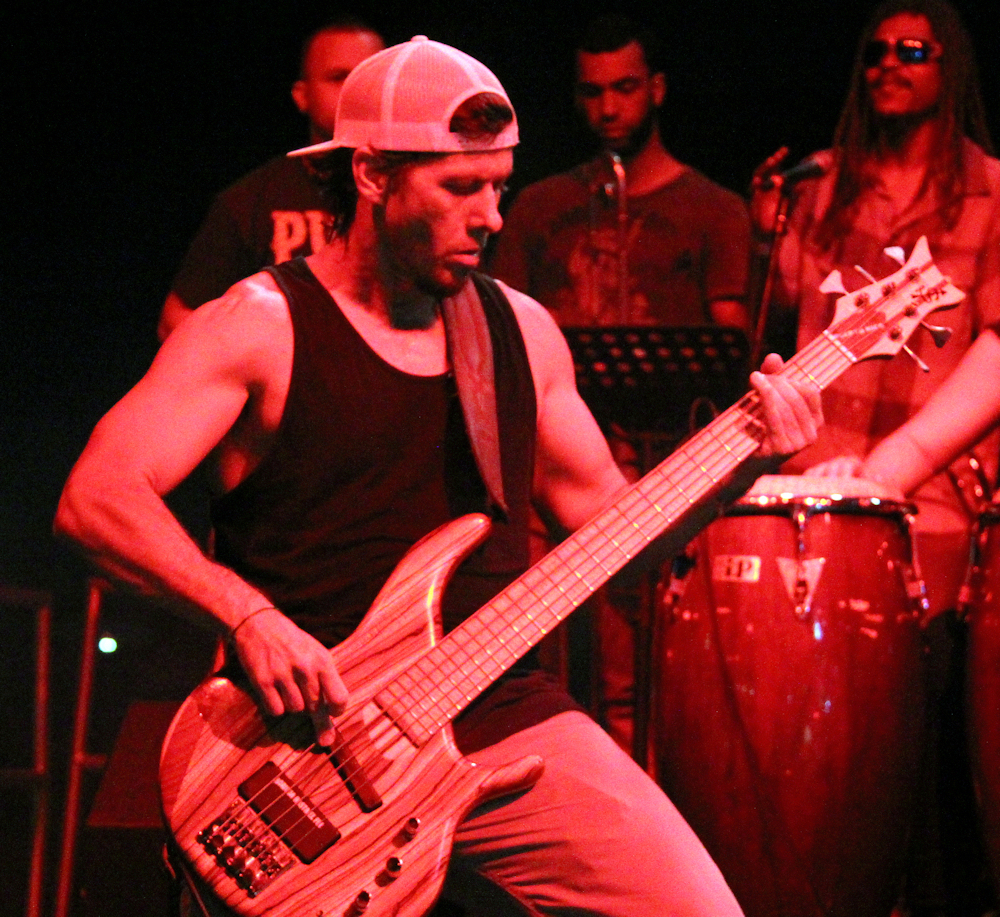
- Harold Hopkins Miranda playing with Puya Puerto Rico on February 8, 2014.

Background information
- Genres: Progressive metal; jazz; salsa; rock en español; hip hop; alternative metal; groove metal
- Years active: 1990–present
- Website: yevapr.com

Harold Hopkins Miranda (born 1973 in San Juan, Puerto Rico) is a Puerto Rican bass player, composer, director and founder of the progressive metal band Puya. Hopkins Miranda is largely responsible for creating Puya's style, a fusion of jazz, salsa and heavy metal. Hopkins Miranda and guitarist Ramon Ortiz are the composers (music and lyrics) of most Puya's songs. Hopkins Miranda is also a developing music producer and plays, composes and directs other musical projects. He is currently the bass player for De La Tierra.

== History ==
=== Beginnings ===
Hopkins Miranda was born to mother Margarita Miranda (of Corozal, Puerto Rico) and father Harold E. Hopkins Jr. (of Stanwood, Michigan) and was raised in Puerto Rico. He started taking classical piano following the example of his older sister, pianist Brenda Hopkins, at an early age. At age 18, he moved to the bass. He had some garage band experience (AC/DC, GNR, Led Zeppelin). His first live gig on bass was with Gilberto Alomar (Puerto Rico's underground rock guitar legend), the late Pedro Candelario (main vocal and guitar) and Rocco Torres (drums) in a John Lennon tribute band, playing mostly Paul McCartney's bass lines.

=== The Evidence ===
After that he formed part of a trio, The Evidence, along with the Alomar brothers, Gilberto (guitar and main vocal) and Hugo (drums), playing rock from the 1960s and 1970s, some originals by Gilberto, and a lot of Jimi Hendrix. In 1990, he got together with high school friend Ramon Ortiz (guitar) and founded Whisker Biscuit (original Latin/rock/funk-fusion).

=== Puya ===
In 1992 Whisker Biscuit moved to Ft. Lauderdale and changed its name to Puya. The band gained good response from the public in the South Florida alternative/Latin/rock/hardcore music scene. In 1993, the band recorded its first six-song cassette, Puya-Whisker Biscuit and then in 1994-95 released a CD titled Puya under Noiz Boiz Records and produced by Jeff Renza/Puya. In May 1996 the band had its first overseas show in Bogota, Colombia at Rock Al Parque Festival. They played in front of 60,000 people and were the only independent band on the bill. After that they started making recordings in Los Angeles, California with producer Bob Ezrin (Kiss, Pink Floyd) under the umbrella ALMO (Rondor Music) Publishing. In 1997 Hopkins Miranda moved with the band to Los Angeles, CA and played in clubs. After a while the band was signed with MCA Records and recorded the Fundamental CD produced by Gustavo Santaolalla (Juanes, Babel). Fundamental won the Best Rock Fusion album of the year at the 2000 Billboard Latin Music Awards. The success of Fundamental sent the band to the Ozzfest '99 tour. Puya has been the only full Latin band to tour with the Ozzfest playing in Spanish. After that was the Snocore (w/Incubus, System of a Down and Mike Patton's Mr. Bungle). Puya has been the opening act for Fear Factory; Iron Maiden; Red Hot Chili Peppers (So. American tour); Sepultura; Hatebreed; Slipknot and others. In 2001 Puya recorded a second album, Union (MCA) produced by Garth Richardson and Andrew Murdock and co-produced by Puya. It features the collaboration of Latin percussionists Angel 'Cachete' Maldonado and Anthony Carrillo as well as Brenda Hopkins Miranda on the piano for one song and the late trumpet player Juancito Torres (Fania All Stars).

=== Yeva ===
Puya took a break in 2004. After having spent some time in Granada, Spain, Hopkins Miranda returned to Puerto Rico and formed another Latin fusion band called Yeva; he also started producing. The three song Yeva EP was produced by Harold. Yeva played Coachella Fest 2007, winning the best newcomer recognition according to the Chicago Tribune. During that time Hopkins Miranda finished producing Puya's first live DVD, Puya P'a Ti- Live in Puerto Rico under his own independent label Ahorake. He also played bass for Tego Calderon, renowned hip hop artist from Puerto Rico, on El Abayarde Contraataca World Tour.

=== Puya comeback ===
Puya made a comeback in 2009, playing many Puerto Rican festivals and headlining one stage at the Rock al Parque 2010 festival in Bogota, Colombia. That year Puya recorded a self-produced, five-song EP, Areyto. Areyto is a music/dance ritual of Puerto Rico's native Taino Indians. On that album Hopkins Miranda composed, arranged and produced two songs, one of which is a derivative work of Nicolas Guillen's "La Muralla" and which featured guest artists Tego Calderón, Tito Auger, Mimi Maura, and Antonio Cabán Vale "El Topo".

=== Tambores Calientes ===
In 2011, Hopkins Miranda founded the rock/blues/bomba fusion band Tambores Calientes with Gilberto Alomar and Marcos Peñalosa. Bomba is original Puerto Rican music with African roots; it is played with three special bomba drums, maracas, and repetitive vocal chants that also contain elements of Taino music and Spanish Gypsy melodies. Tambores Calientes is the first band with this unique combination of sounds. Other works include Julio Voltio, Garcia Lopez, Antiheroes and Trafico Pesado. In Hopkins Miranda's own words, "music never ceases to amaze and nurture the spirits on its ever evolving nature."

In 2017 Harold joined Latin American metal supergroup De La Tierra to replace Sr. Flavio.
