= Puya (band) =

Puerto Rican progressive metal band

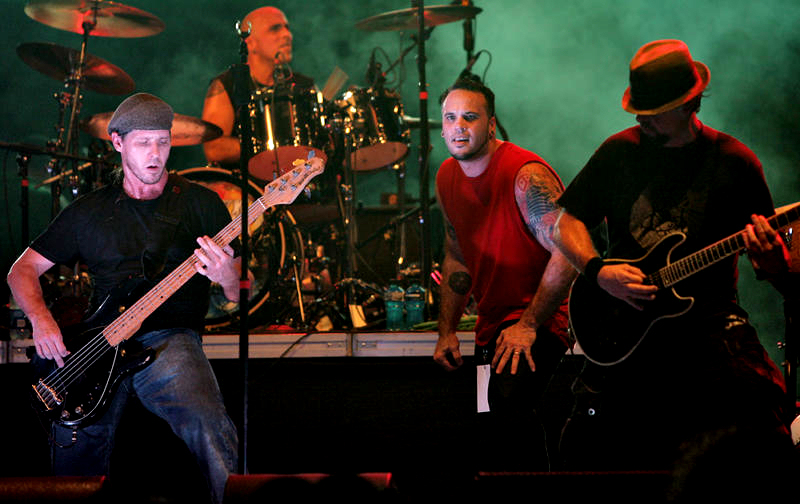
- Puya in Puerto Rico (2010) from left to right: Harold Hopkins, Eduardo Paniagua, Sergio Curbelo, and Ramon Ortiz

Background information
- Origin: Puerto Rico
- Genres: Progressive metal; jazz; salsa; rock en español; Latin alternative
- Years active: 1991–2005; 2009–present
- Members: Eduardo Paniagua; Harold Hopkins Miranda; Ramon Ortiz; Sergio Curbelo
- Website: www.puyaonline.com

Puya is a Puerto Rican rock band. Formed in 1991, the band rose to prominence with their fusion of jazz, salsa and heavy metal.

== History ==
The band originally formed in Puerto Rico as a progressive rock combo, in 1991, under the name Whisker Biscuit. In 1992, the band added vocalist Sergio Curbelo and moved to Fort Lauderdale, Florida, where they created a mix of salsa and heavy metal with the assistance of Jeff Renza and the Noiz Boiz production studio. They adopted the name Puya in 1994, which is Spanish for "sharp point", but is also a popular type of Puerto Rican coffee. Puya was the first Puerto Rican rock band to achieve a high level of international success.

In 1995, Puya released their self-titled debut album under the Noiz Boiz label, but did not sign with the label. There they also met producer Gustavo Santaolalla who signed them to MCA and in 1999 released their second album, Fundamental, which received critical praise. This propelled the band to stardom even landing them in the second stage of Ozzfest where they shared the opening slot with Slipknot in 1999. In 2000, their song "Tírale" was included in the soundtrack of the movie Heavy Metal 2000, and was the collection's only track with Spanish lyrics. The band opened for Sepultura, Red Hot Chili Peppers, Pantera and Kiss. They also recorded a cover of The Police's "Spirits in the Material World" in Spanish, with the title "Almas en un mundo material".

When sales of the band's 2001 album Union did not meet MCA's expectations, the label did not renew the band's contract. After a 2002 performance at Tito Puente Amphitheater in Puerto Rico (which was later released on DVD), Puya went on an extended hiatus. During this time Ramon Ortiz formed the band Ankla.

In 2009, Puya reunited and performed in front of over 12,000 fans at Stereo Music Fest at the Puerto Rico Convention Center. The digital EP Areyto appeared on iTunes on August 27, 2010. The band has since continued on with a lighter touring schedule, focusing primarily on "special shows" like Cuba’s Patria Grande Festival in 2014.

In 2018, Sergio Curbelo left the band. Diego Romero of Trujillo Alto, Puerto Rico, replaced him and they released two singles together, "Súbele La Candela" whose lyrics speak about the protests held in Puerto Rico against former governor Ricardo Rosselló and "Viento". In 2020, Puya announced that Romero had left the band to start a solo career and that Curbelo was returning to the band. Puya entered the studio in the summer of 2020 and teased a new song "Potencial" on the Puerto Rican digital radio station AZ Rock Radio.

== Musical style and influences ==
Puya's music is defined by placing emphasis on heavy guitar grooves and percussive Latin rhythms, punctuated by big band horns, with composed melodies that lead into instrumental improvisation. Additionally, some of Puya's songs have also incorporated rapping. Puya's music draws from diverse styles, including salsa, Cuban rumba, bomba, alternative rock, hard rock, blues rock, heavy metal, jazz and progressive rock.

Puya was influenced by Pantera, Rush, Fania All-Stars, Fishbone, Metallica, Black Sabbath, Van Halen and Sepultura.

The band's music has been categorized as Latin alternative, hardcore, hard rock, heavy metal, Latin metal, progressive metal rock en español, and nu metal. While classified as nu-metal, this is contested by Latin Music: Musicians, Genres, and Themes, which says that Puya is not a part of this genre and has its own style of music.

== Band members ==
- Ramon Ortiz – guitar
- Eduardo Paniagua – drums
- Harold Hopkins Miranda – bass
- Sergio Curbelo (1992–2018, 2020–present) – vocals

=== Former members ===
- Diego Romero (2018–2020) – vocals

== Discography ==
Studio releases

- Puya (1995) LP
- Fundamental (1999) LP
- Union (2001) LP
- Areyto (2010) EP
- Potencial (2024) EP

Live releases

- Pa Ti En Vivo: Live In Puerto Rico (2006) DVD
- Vital (2014) LP

Singles

- "Montate" (1998)
- "Oasis" (1999)
- "Sal Pa Fuera (Break It Up)" (1999)
- "Ride"/"People"/"Numbed" (as Union 3 Song Sampler) (2001)
- "Pa'Ti Pa'Mí" (promotional video only) (2001)
- "Subele la Candela" (2019)
- "Viento" (2020)*
- "Potencial" (2021)
- "Machete y Garabato" (2022)
- "Falling Illusions" (2024)

== See also ==
- Puerto Rican rock
