= Simon Bisley =

British comic book artist

- Bisley at Dragon Con in 2026
- Born: 4 March 1962 (age 64)
- Areas: Penciller, Artist, Inker, Colourist
- Notable works: ABC Warriors; Lobo; Sláine
- Awards: Eagle Award for "Favourite British Artist" (1990); Eisner Award for "Best Artist" (1992)

Simon Bisley is a British comic book artist best known for his 1990s work on ABC Warriors, Lobo and Sláine.

== Early life ==
Simon Bisley was born in Lincolnshire, England. He is self-taught, beginning drawing aged 6, with only a short one-year stay at an art college, saying "I found it very difficult to get any kind of feedback from the art teachers. They weren't interested at all in what I was doing, so I became kind of very introverted with regard to my artwork and yeah, I was just all self-taught."

== Career ==
Bisley started his career doing magazine and album covers, his first work being a T-shirt design for heavy metal magazine Kerrang!

Eventually, even though he had no experience in comics strip drawing at the time, he was hired by the magazine 2000 AD after they saw his interpretations of their magazine characters. According to the Comic Book Database, "while still a student, Bisley did a painting of a robot holding a baby that he sent to the offices of 2000 AD. The image was seen by Pat Mills and inspired him to relaunch the ABC Warriors strip, with Bisley as artist, in 1987". He started with work on ABC Warriors in 1987, later moving to Sláine and Judge Dredd.

Simon Bisley significantly contributed to the visual and conceptual development of the character Lobo (DC Comics) in the comic book universe. Alan Grant and Keith Giffen initially contacted Bisley to rework Lobo's appearance. Bisley added distinctive elements such as big biker boots, skull knee guards, a hook and chain around Lobo's arm, and made the character much more muscular, transforming him into an impressive space biker.

He also created Lobo's dog, “Dawg”, incorporating the character into the story despite it not being in the original script. Bisley's tendency to add more than what was written in the script sometimes led Grant to rewrite sections of the book.

Bisley's distorted and surreal artistic style, combined with garish colors and crude language, emphasized the character's violent and absurd nature. He illustrated the 1990 4 issues mini-series Lobo: The Last Czarnian, written by Keith Giffen and Alan Grant, where Lobo, the intergalactic bounty hunter, escorts a mysterious prisoner. Simon Bisley also illustrated the 1992 four-issue mini-series Lobo's Back, where Lobo is killed and sent to both heaven and hell, only to fight his way back to life. The series is filled with dark humor, over-the-top violence, and Lobo's characteristic irreverence.

In addition to his interior artwork, Bisley also produced iconic painted covers that became closely associated with Lobo's brutal and offbeat image. Originally a minor character, Bisley significantly contributed to the reinvention of Lobo with an anarchic touch that left a lasting impact, making it one of his most iconic contributions to the comic book world.

The original painting for Lobo #1 sold for $192,000 at auction in 2021.

Since 1997, Bisley has been a regular contributor to the comics magazine Heavy Metal.

Bisley has done design work for several music videos, including Chippendales' "Room Service".

In the early 2000s, Bisley was commissioned to create artwork for the drum kit used by System of a Down drummer John Dolmayan, an avid comic book collector and vendor. Dolmayan commissioned Bisley to illustrate the Hulk and Thing on one drum, while the art for other drums in the kit, which depicted other characters and scenes, were produced by Kevin Eastman, Tim Vigil, and Arthur Adams.

== Influences ==
Bisley's style is strongly influenced by Frank Frazetta, Gustav Klimt, Salvador Dalí, and Richard Corben, Bill Sienkiewicz, and Egon Schiele. He also took inspiration from rock album covers and graffiti as well as traditional comics art.

Bisley's work influenced the Beast in the 2006 Doctor Who episode "The Satan Pit", and Simon Pegg's character graphic artist Tim Bisley on the Channel 4 sitcom Spaced.

== Bibliography ==
=== Comics ===
==== DC ====
- Absolute Batman #6 (variant cover) (2025)
- The Authority/Lobo (with co-writers Keith Giffen and Alan Grant):
  - Jingle Hell (2004)
  - Spring Break Massacre (2005)
- Batman: Black & White, miniseries, #2 (with Neil Gaiman, 1996)
- Batman/Judge Dredd: Judgement on Gotham (with John Wagner and Alan Grant, 1991) ISBN 1-56389-022-4
- Batman/Lobo One-Shot (April 2000)
- The Demon vol. 3 #12 (cover) (1991)
- Global Frequency #7 (with Warren Ellis, 2003)
- Hellblazer #259–260, 265–266, 276, 282, 292, Annual 2011 (full art); #271–274 (along with Giuseppe Camuncoli) (2009–12)
- Lobo:
  - The Last Czarnian (with co-writers Keith Giffen and Alan Grant, 96 pages, 1992) ISBN 0-930289-99-4
  - Lobo's Back (with Keith Giffen, 96 pages, 1993) ISBN 1-56389-103-4
  - Paramilitary Christmas Special (with Keith Giffen and Alan Grant, 1991)
- The Spectre vol. 3 #27 and 53 (cover) (1995 and 1997)

==== Fleetway ====
- 2000 AD (ABC Warriors): ##555–558, 563–568, 577–581 (1988); (Sláine): #626–635, 650–656, 662–664, 688–698 (1989–90); (Judge Dredd) #1068 (1997)
- Judge Dredd Megazine #1.14, 1.16, 1.17, 1.19, 2.61, 2.62, 3.15, 3.17 (1991–96)

==== Full Circle ====
- Full Cirkle, vol. 1 (with Simon Reed, 2003)
- Full Cirkle, vol. 2 (with Simon Reed, 2007)
- Thicker Than Blood (colours, with Simon Reed and art by Mike Ploog, 2007)

==== Marvel ====
- X-Men Unlimited #46 (with Ian Edginton, 2003)
- Halo Graphic Novel, (with Lee Hammock, 2006)
- Incredible Hulk #620 (with Brandon Montclare, 2011)

==== Verotik ====
- Verotika #1 (with Glenn Danzig (w), 1994)
- Verotika #2 (cover, 1995)
- Death Dealer #1 (with Glenn Danzig (w) and Frank Frazetta (cover), 1995)
- Satanika (Vol 1) #0 (with Glenn Danzig (w) and Frank Frazetta (cover), 1995)
- Satanika (Vol 1) #1–2 (covers, 1995)
- Jaguar God #0 (with Glenn Danzig (w), 1996)
- Verotik Illustrated (with Bill Oakley, 1997)
- Ge Rouge #1/2 (with Glenn Danzig (w), 1998)
- Dalkiel The Prophecy (with Glenn Danzig (w), 1998)
- The Darker Horror of Morella (with Glenn Danzig (w), 2001)
- Inquisitor (cover, 2002)
- Hidden Lyrics of the Left Hand (with Glenn Danzig (w), 2010)
- Jaguar God Snake Brothers Revenge (with Glenn Danzig (w), 2012)
- Satanika 18th Anniversary Issue (with Glenn Danzig (w), 2013)
- Verotika Returns (Vol 1) #2–3 (with Glenn Danzig (w), 2014)
- The Infernals (with Glenn Danzig (w), 2017)
- Lyrics of the Left Hand, Volume II (with Glenn Danzig (w), 2018)
- Satanika Versus Morella's Demon #1–2 (with Glenn Danzig (w), 2019
- Verotika Revenge (with Glenn Danzig (w), 2021)

==== Other publishers ====
- "Once Upon A Time in the West" (with Alan Grant, in Toxic! #1, 1991)
- "Reapers" (with John Arcudi, in Dark Horse Presents: Aliens, Dark Horse Comics, 1992, collected in Aliens Omnibus #3, 2008, ISBN 1-59307-872-2)
- The Terminator: The Enemy Within #1–4 (Dark Horse Comics, 1991–1992, covers)
- Bisley's Scrapbook (Atomeka Press, 1993)
- Melting Pot (with Kevin Eastman/Eric Talbot, Kitchen Sink Press, 1995, ISBN 0-87816-362-X)
- Teenage Mutant Ninja Turtles: Bodycount (with Kevin Eastman, 4-issue mini-series, tpb, Image Comics, 1996, tpb, ISBN 1-887279-36-9)
- Mutant Chronicles: Golgotha (illustration by Bisley, Acclaim Comics, 1996)
- Bad Boy (with Frank Miller, one-shot, Oni Press, Dynamite Entertainment, 1997)
- Fistful of Blood (with script and layouts by Kevin Eastman, in Heavy Metal #192–202, May 2001 – January 2003, hardcover, 64 pages, February 2003, ISBN 1-882931-86-6)
- The Dead (with Alan Grant, Berserker Comics, 2008–2009)
- Church of Hell #1–3 (Berserker Comics, 2009, covers)
- The Lost Pages (Zaid Comics, 2020, cover)
- The Lost Pages 3 (Zaid Comics, 2023, cover)
- SOS: Onslaught (Chimera Comics, 2020, cover)

=== Collected editions ===
- The Authority/Lobo: Holiday Hell (160 pages, 2006) ISBN 1-4012-0992-0
- Global Frequency, Volume 2: Detonation Radio, ISBN 1-4012-0291-8
- Heavy Metal Dredd (with John Wagner/Alan Grant, reprinted from Rock Power, collected in Heavy Metal Dredd ISBN 0-7493-1555-5):
  - "A Mega-City Primer" (in Judge Dredd Megazine #1.14, 1991 and 2000 AD #1068, 1997)
  - "Rock On, Tommy Who?!" (in Judge Dredd Megazine #1.16, 1992)
  - "Chicken Run" (in Judge Dredd Megazine #1.17, 1992)
  - "The Legend of Johnny Biker" (in Judge Dredd Megazine #1.19, 1992)
  - "Ironfist" (in Judge Dredd Megazine #2.61, 1994)
  - "Night Before Christmas" (in Judge Dredd Megazine #2.62, 1994)
  - "The Great Arsoli" (in Judge Dredd Megazine #3.15, 1996)
  - "Bimba" (in Judge Dredd Megazine #3.17, 1996)

=== Music album covers ===
- Mayhemic Destruction (1987), by Mortal Sin
- Created in Hate (1988) by Annihilated
- First Offence (1988), by First Offence
- Kilt by Death (1990), by Drunken State
- Thrall-Demonsweatlive (1993), by Danzig
- 6:66 Satan's Child (1999), by Danzig
- Gorgeous Frankenstein (2007), by Gorgeous Frankenstein
- Lost Tracks of Danzig (2007), by Danzig
- Among Flies (2008), by Last House on The Left
- Black Laden Crown (2017) by Danzig
- The Blood of Gods (2017), by Gwar

=== Computer game box ===
- Gods (1991), by The Bitmap Brothers
- Weaponlord (1995), by Visual Concepts
- Fur Fighters (2000), by Bizarre Creations (Viggo's Revenge release)
- Tekken Tag Tournament 2 (2012), by Namco Bandai Games (Heihachi Mishima's second costume.)

=== Role-playing games ===
- Conan: Adventures in an Age Undreamed Of (2017, Modiphius Entertainment, inner pages illustrations by Simon Bisley, among others)

=== Movie posters ===
- Centurion (2010) (Possibly in error, also attributed to Simon Bowles and Pathe productions.)
- Black Death (2010)

=== Books ===
- Biz: The Intense Art of Simon Bisley (Verotik Pub Inc, August 1997)
- Fakk 2 (80 pages, Heavy Metal Magazine, June 1999)
- The Art of Simon Bisley Redux (132 pages, Heavy Metal Magazine, June 2007, ISBN 1-932413-79-0)
- Simon Bisley's Illustrations from the Bible: A Work in Progress (Heavy Metal Magazine, July 2007, ISBN 1-932413-78-2)
- Simon Bisley Calendar 2010 (Heavy Metal Magazine, August 2009, ISBN 1-935351-06-0)

== Awards ==
- 1990: Won "Favourite Artist UK" Eagle Award
- 1992:
  - Won "Best Artist" Eisner Award, for Judgement on Gotham
  - Won "Best Artist" UK Comic Art Award
  - Won "Best Original Graphic Novel" UK Comic Art Award for Judgment on Gotham (with John Wagner and Alan Grant)
  - Nominated for "Best Cover Artist" Eisner Award, for Judgement on Gotham and Doom Patrol
  - Nominated for "Best Graphic Album: New/First US Publication" Eisner Award, for Judgement on Gotham (with Alan Grant and John Wagner)
- 1993:
  - Nominated for "Best Cover Artist" Eisner Award, for Grendel: War Child, Terminator, and Enemy Within
  - Nominated for "Best Painter (Interior)" Eisner Award, for "Lair of the Lizard Ladies" in Mr. Monster Attacks #3
  - Nominated for "Best Artist" UK Comic Art Award
- 2002: Nominated for "Best Artist Ever" National Comics Award
- 2024: Inducted into the London Film and Comic Con's Hall Of Fame.
