= Claudio Brindis de Salas =

Cuban musician (1800–1872)

- Born: 30 October 1800; Havana, Cuba
- Died: 17 December 1872 (aged 72); Argentina
- Occupation: Musician
- Children: Claudio Brindis de Salas Garrido (son)

Claudio Brindis de Salas Monte (Havana, 30 October 1800 – 17 December 1872) was a violinist and double bass player who directed the most famous Cuban dance orchestra of his day. His band, the Concha de Oro (the "Golden Shell"), founded in the early 19th century, was the most popular band of its time. It played the dance music of the epoch at the balls of the island's aristocracy: contradanzas, minuets, rigadoons, quadrilles, lancers, and waltzes. Concha de Oro was basically a típica, or wind orchestra, which was sometimes augmented to 100 players for special occasions such as fiestas.

Brindis de Salas, a disciple of the maestro Ignacio Calvo, was also a composer of creole danzas and the author of an operetta, Congojas matrimoniales. In 1844, his musical career was interrupted by his involvement in the Escalera Conspiracy, for which whites were absolved, but blacks paid dearly. Brindis de Salas was arrested and tortured. He was banished from the island by the Governor, O'Donnell. Returning in 1848, Brindis de Salas was imprisoned for two years, and when he eventually was free to think about reorganizing his band, he found out that most of them had been executed.

Apart from the operetta, he is known for a melody dedicated to General Concha, printed in 1854. His son, Claudio Brindis de Salas Garrido (Havana, 4 August 1852 – Buenos Aires, 1 June 1911), was an even better violinist, of world renown.
