= Claudio Brindis de Salas Garrido =

Cuban violinist (1852–1911)

Claudio Jose Brindis de Salas Garrido
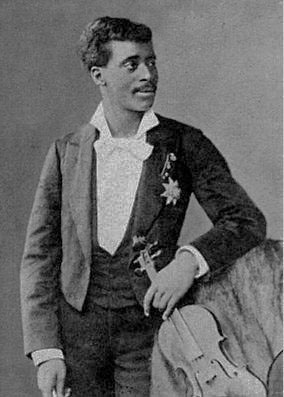
- Claudio Brindis de Salas in 1880 with his Stradivarius and his Prussian decoration "Order of the Black Eagle"

Background information
- Also known as: El Paganini Negro, El Rey de las Octavas
- Born: 4 August 1852; Havana, Cuba
- Died: 1 June 1911 (aged 58) Buenos Aires, Argentina
- Occupations: Concert violinist, composer
- Instrument: Violin
- Father: Claudio Brindis de Salas

Claudio José Domingo Brindis de Salas Garrido (4 August 1852 – 1 June 1911) was a Cuban concert violinist.

== Biography ==
His father was the violinist and bandleader Claudio Brindis de Salas. The son surpassed his father, and was a violinist of world renown. He studied under his father, and then with maestros José Redondo and the Belgian José Van der Gutch (who lived in Havana). In 1863 he first performed in public, in Havana, with Van der Gutch as accompanist. Ignacio Cervantes also played at the same function.

In 1864 he toured with his father and his brother José del Rosario in the Cuban cities of Matanzas, Cárdenas, Cienfuegos and Güines; in 1869 to Veracruz, Mexico. He went from Mexico to Paris, to study under Hubert Léonard and Charles Dancla, and gained entry to Conservatoire de Paris, where he won first prize in 1871. He then toured Florence, Turin and Milan, where he played at La Scala. His tours in Europe brought great critical and public enthusiasm.

In 1875, he returned to the Americas, and was appointed director of the Conservatoire de Haiti. He played in Caracas (1876), in Cuba in Havana (1878) and Santiago de Cuba, then to Veracruz again and Mexico City, where he performed Mendelssohn's Concerto for violin and orchestra. In later years he played in Saint Petersburg (1881), New York (1887), Barcelona (1889), Santo Domingo (1895), San Juan, Puerto Rico, Port of Spain, Trinidad and Tobago (1896), Caracas (1899), Tenerife (1902), Ronda, Spain (1911), and ended his career in Argentina. These tours were punctuated with returns and concerts in Cuba, mainly Havana.

Claudio composed a few works, but he was primarily a concert performer, and to judge from critical notices, one of the best in the world at that time. Alejo Carpentier called him "the most extraordinary of the black musicians of the nineteenth century... an unprecedented case in the musical history of the continent". The French government made him a member of the Légion d'Honneur, and the German Kaiser gave him the title of "Baron de Salas".

In Buenos Aires, he was given a genuine Stradivarius; when he stayed in Berlin, he married a German woman, was appointed chamber musician to the Emperor, and became a German citizen.

He died in 1911, then in poverty, from tuberculosis in Buenos Aires. In 1930, his remains were transferred to Havana with great honours. The church, Iglesia de San Francisco de Paula, Havana, contains his ashes.
