= Ankla =

American heavy metal band

- Origin: Los Angeles, California, United States
- Genres: Thrash metal; metalcore; death metal
- Years active: 2001–present
- Label: Bieler Bros. Records
- Members: Ramón Ortiz; Oscar Santiago
- Past members: Ikaro Stafford Santana. Edgar Gonzalez, Marcello D. Rapp, J.J. McNeal, John Paul Soars, Aaron Rossi, Pepe Clarke Magaña

Ankla is an American heavy metal band from Los Angeles, California.

== History ==
Ankla was formed in 2001 by Puya guitarist Ramón Ortiz. The band independently released a self-titled 7-track EP in 2002, produced by Stone Sour drummer Roy Mayorga.

On April 8, 2006, it was announced that Ankla signed with Bieler Bros. Records. Their debut album Steep Trails was produced by Bob Marlette, and was released on July 25, 2006.

In 2007, Ankla played the second stage at Ozzfest. In 2008, the band's line up changed, replacing former singer Ikaro Stafford with Eddie Macias, who had previously worked with Ramón Ortíz in the early stages of Puya.

== Music style ==
IGN described Ankla's style of music as a mixture of "thrash metal, metalcore and death metal".

== Members ==
- Ramón Ortíz - guitars (2001–present)
- Oscar Santiago - percussion (2005–present), drums (2011-present)

=== Former ===
- Ikaro Stafford Santana - vocals (2001–2007)
- Danny Estrada - drums (2001-2002)
- Anthony Jiménez - percussion (2001-2004)
- Edgar González - bass (2001–2006)
- Aaron Rossi - drums (2002–2006)
- Rik Barba - bass (2009 - 2011)
- Tony Castaneda - bass (2006-2009)
- Pepe Clarke Magaña - drums (2006-2010)
- Eddie Macias - vocals (2008-2010)
- Nick Moreno - vocals (2011)
- Jason MacGuire (Evil J) - bass (2011)
- Dantai Lopez - percussion (2011)

== Discography ==
- Ankla (2002)
- Steep Trails (2006)
- Persistence (2010)
