= La tecnica cubana =

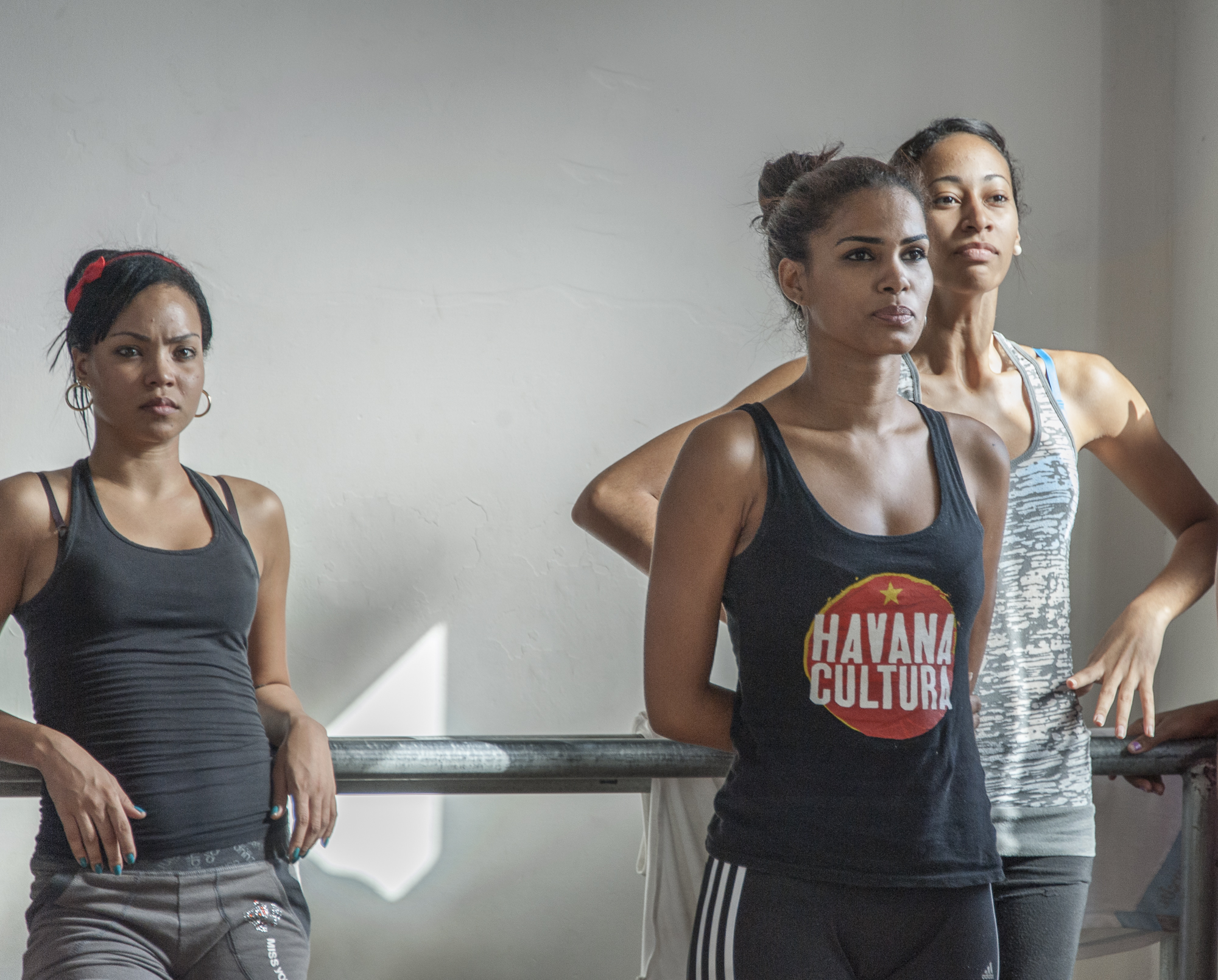
Cuban contemporary dancers in Havana in January 2014.

La técnica cubana, often abbreviated as técnica, is a form of Cuban contemporary dance that was founded by Ramiro Guerra Suarez in Cuba in 1959. Unlike other forms of traditional Cuban dance, técnica fuses many different dance forms together, such as those from Africa, Europe, and North America. It is a highly expressive and robust dance form, incorporating many quick jumps and undulating movements of the torso and pelvis. Técnica blends a high amount of movement and expression with a degree of synchronization, producing an athletic, theatrical dance form.

Técnica was founded directly following the 1959 Cuban Revolution. The Revolution was driven by ideas of socialism and a lack of Cuban nationalism, which brought about major change to the political, economical, and social realms of Cuba. The new Castro regime provided funding and government support to expand the arts, and thus técnica, a new Cuban dance form was established. The similar timing of técnica’s birth allowed the dance form to incorporate many revolutionary ideas—boosting Cuban nationalism and providing a sense of national and personal identity for Cubans. Técnica incorporated this nationalist vision into its dance technique and created a sense of cubanidad, or “Cuban-ness.”

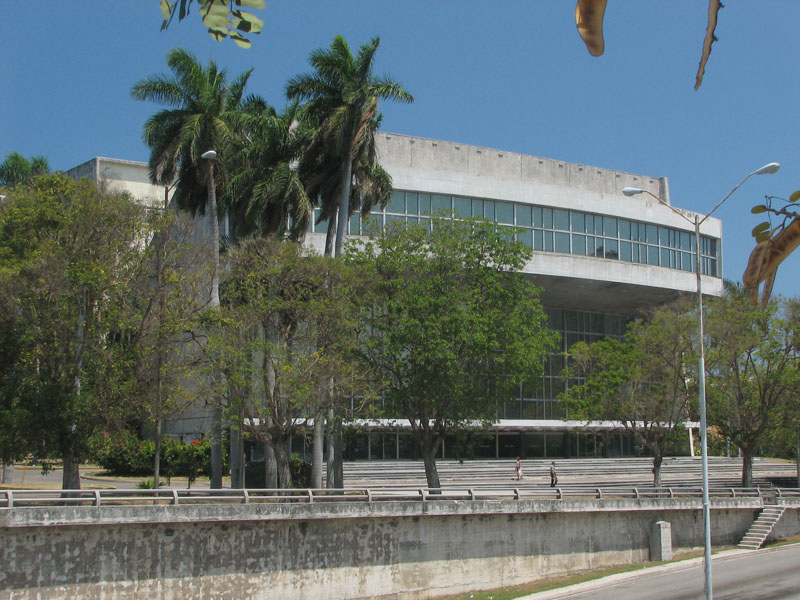
Teatro Nacional in Havana Cuba
