= Miguel Faílde =

Cuban musician

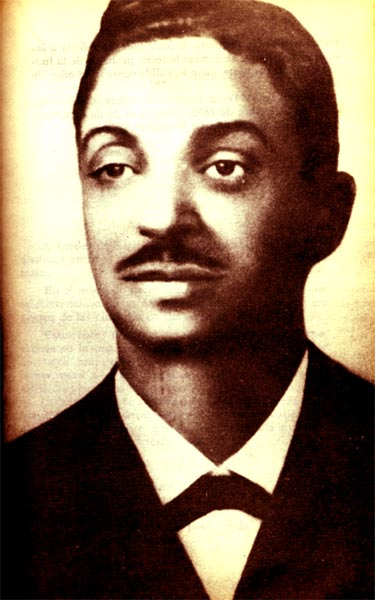
- Born: December 23, 1852; Guacamaro, Matanzas
- Died: December 26, 1921
- Resting place: Necropolis San Carlos Borromeo, Matanzas
- Occupations: musician and bandleader
- Known for: Official originator of the danzón, and the founder of the Orquesta Faílde

Miguel Faílde Pérez (23 December 1852, in Guacamaro, Matanzas – 26 December 1921) was a Cuban musician and bandleader. He was the official originator of the danzón, composer of the first danzón, Las alturas de Simpson, and the founder of the Orquesta Faílde.

== Biography ==
Faílde's father was a Galician immigrant, and his mother a parda (dark mulata). He was first taught music by his father, who was a trombone player, and at ten played cornet in the Banda de Bomberos (firemen) de Matanzas. Later he learnt harmony and composition under a French tutor, Federico Peclier. He also learnt the viola and double bass. Faílde was one of many musicians who actively conspired against the Spanish colonial rule; his life included the time of the Cuban War of Independence.

His orchestra was highly successful, though his major achievements were the creation of the danzón and the compositions he wrote, many of which have been adapted since for other rhythms. The danzón was, in his own words, a development of the danza, and that was the child of the contradanza. "De la danza al danzón había un simple paso." (from the danza to the danzón is a simple step) Actually, it was not quite such a simple step. For a start, the danzón was a much slower dance than both the contradanza and the danza; and it allowed for pauses between the different sections of a number. Both these features were welcomed in the tropical climate of Cuba. Perhaps even more significantly, the danzón was a couple dance, though not a moving one like the waltz. The contradanza and danza were both sequence dances involving the whole dance-floor, as were all ballroom dances before the waltz.

The habanera was the established favourite before the danzón came on the scene. It was also a slow dance, and a descendant of the contradanza. The habanera had the advantage of being a sung genre, which the danzón was not until much later. Both genres made use of syncopated creole rhythms; in the danzón it is the cinquillo. In retrospect it is often difficult to see why one genre is preferred to another; the quality of compositions and the orchestras which choose to play it must have some influence.

Did Faílde really invent the danzón? The doubt is caused by the work of Manuel Saumell, who anticipated many of the rhythms which came later in the 19th century, and who may be the most important Cuban composer of that century. At length the Cuban government made Faílde the official inventor of the danzón – in 1960, by which time the danzón had become a relic, and its 'child', the chachachá, had taken over.

After his death in 1921 he was interred in the Necropolis San Carlos Borromeo, Matanzas.
