= Teatro Villanueva =

Theatre in Havana, Cuba, opened 1847

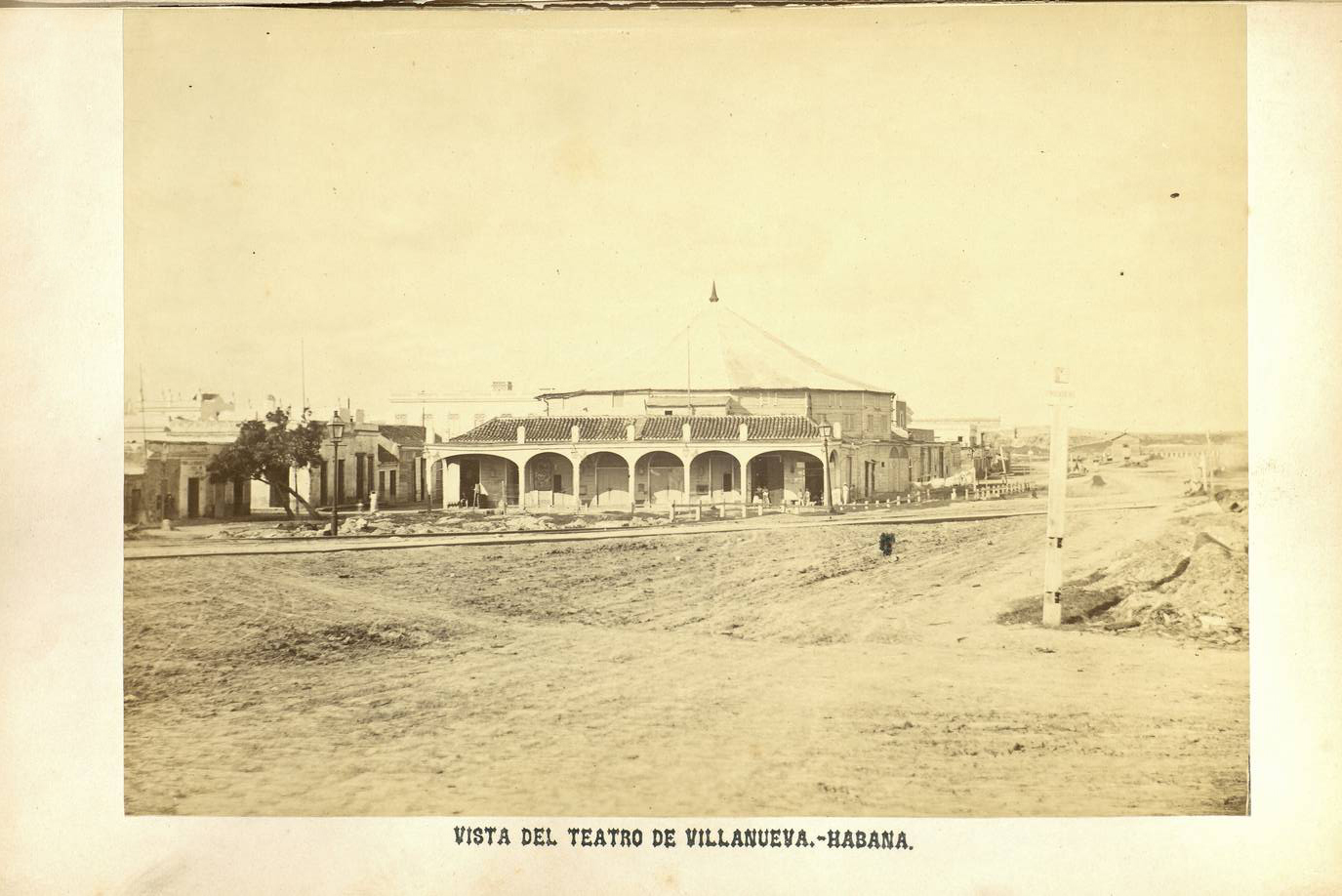
The Teatro Villanueva circa 1872

Teatro Villanueva (or the Villanueva Theatre) was a theatre in colonial Havana, Cuba. Located on Calle Morro, it was inaugurated in February 1847 under the name Circo Habanero. The circular structure was built of wood and had a reported capacity of 4000. It was mainly used for bufo performances. Renovations were carried out in 1853, when the theatre was renamed Teatro Villanueva. The owner was Miguel Nin y Pons, a protégé of the Count of Villanueva, Claudio Martínez de Pinillos.

== Background ==
The theatre has a special pace in the lore of Cuban independence from Spain. On 22 January 1869, auxiliary military forces consisting of Spanish criollos (also known as the Volunteer Corps) opened fire on theatre attendees. This came to be known as the Events of the Villanueva Theatre (Sucesos del Teatro Villanueva). The teenager José Martí and his teacher Rafael María de Mendive were reportedly in the vicinity; soon after, Martí released his revolutionary poem Abdala.

To this day, the Events of the Villanueva Theatre are commemorated in Cuba, and 22 January is designated as Cuban Theatre Day.

After the events, the theatre closed down, later becoming the site of a tenement house.
