= Ramon Ortiz (musician) =

Puerto Rican guitarist and composer (born 1970)

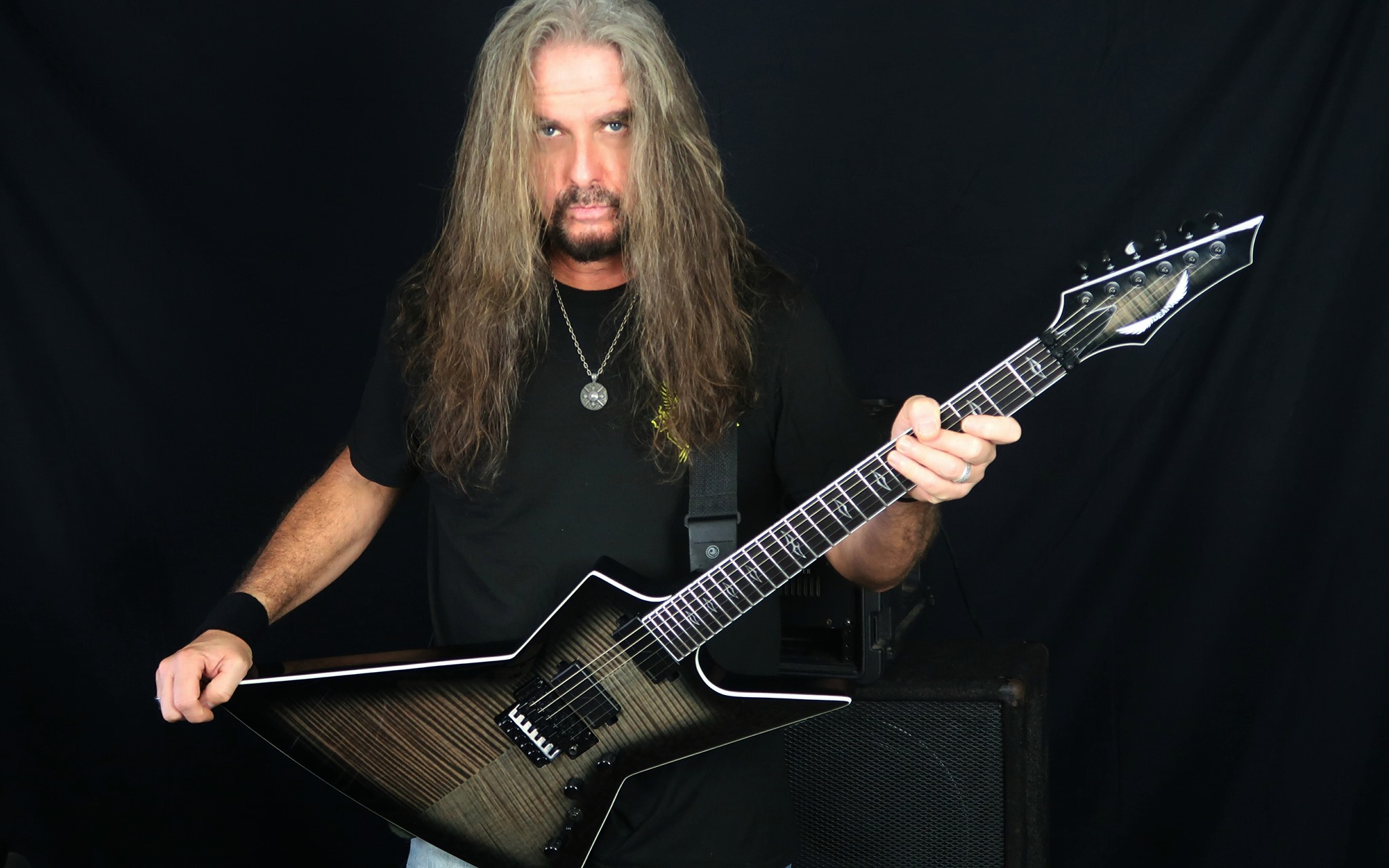

Background information
- Born: June 15, 1970 (age 56); San Juan, Puerto Rico
- Genres: Progressive metal; jazz; salsa; rock en español; thrash metal; metalcore; death metal
- Instruments: Guitar; cuatro
- Website: ramonortiz.net

Ramón Ortiz (June 15, 1970) is a Puerto Rican guitarist and composer, best known as a founding member and director of the progressive metal band Puya, the heavy metal band Ankla and his solo project ORTIZ. Ramón is a pioneer of the Latin metal movement internationally. His music is a fusion that blends the power of guitar driven heavy rock and metal with the syncopated beats of Afro-Caribbean music. As once stated by Peavey amplification: "his music is an exercise in contrast and control, like a fist inside a velvet glove. Born in San Juan, Puerto Rico, he started the guitar at age seven. Son and grandson of the guitar and the Puerto Rican cuatro. He studied classical guitar at the Music Conservatory of Puerto Rico during his adolescence."

== Puya ==
Ramón founded Puya in the early 90s, which continues to be one of the most notable heavy rock bands in Latin America. In 1998 the band signed to MCA/Universal and released the album Fundamental in 1999 .The album which was produced by Gustavo Santaolaya and one track by Bob Ezrin won the 1999 Latin Billboard award for Best Rock Fusion album. During that time the band toured with Ozzfest 1999, Red Hot Chili Peppers, KISS, Iron Maiden, System of a Down, Pantera, Slipknot and many others. At that point Ortiz had already proven that heavy rock and Latin music could coexist within the same musical terrain.

== Ankla ==
Later on in his career Ramón founded a heavier band on the Latin metal genre, Ankla. In 2006, the band was signed by Bieler Brothers and released their first album "Steep Trails", produced by Ortiz and Bob Marlette. In 2007 Ankla was a featured band on Ozzfest (second time for Ramon) sharing the bill this time around with Lamb of God, Behemoth, Hatebreed and Ozzy Osbourne. The single "Deceit" was in heavy rotation on Sirius Satellite's "Hard Attack". "Steep Trails" was published as number 12 on Revolver Magazine's list of "Top Metal Albums of 2006".

== Solo albums ==
In 2012 Ramon released his first solo album by the name "ORTIZ". It contains 13 tracks and was produced by Nick Page and Ramón. Mixed and mastered by Alexis Pérez. His second solo album Portal was released on September 15, 2015 and has a more progressive sound than its predecessor. Stylistically this stage of his career follows the same line of fusion between heavy rock and metal and Afro-Caribbean swing but more centered around his guitar and his commitment with his main instrument. Both albums have been favorites of Liquid Metal in Sirius Satellite Radio[8]. In 2019 he released his third solo effort the EP Corozo produced by Ramon, mixed and mastered by Francisco Paco Barreras at Mistique Red Studios. That same year he was also invited to be part of the show Mi Pasion Mi Vida Mi Guitarra alongside three of Puerto Rico's most prominent string players. Currently, Ramon resides in Puerto Rico and remains occupied as a guitar teacher, performing solo shows and sporadic meetings of Puya, among other projects. Firm believer in musical alchemy and continues to seek new developments for his fusion.

== Gear ==
Ramon is endorsed by Dean Guitars, Mesa Boogie Amps and D'Addario strings.

== Discography ==
- Save from Ourselves (1st edition) -Mattador-Osama records 1990
- Puya-Puya-Noiz Boiz records 1994
- Fundamental-Puya-MCA/Universal 1999
- Union -Puya-MCA/Universal 2001
- Steep Trails-Ankla-Bieler Brothers-2006
- Persistence(ep)-Ankla-Ankla Music-2009
- Areyto - Puya Puya Music-2010
- ORTIZ-Ramon Ortiz-Anklado Music-2012
- Portal-Ramon Ortiz-Anklado Music-2015
- Corozo-Ramon Ortiz-Anklado Music-2019
