= Turtle Power: The Definitive History of the Teenage Mutant Ninja Turtles =

- Film poster
- Directed by: Randall Lobb
- Written by: Randall Lobb
- Produced by: Randall Lobb
- Starring: Peter Laird; Kevin Eastman
- Production companies: FauxPop Media; iProductions
- Distributed by: Paramount Home Media Distribution
- Release date: August 12, 2014
- Running time: 98 minutes
- Country: United States
- Language: English

Turtle Power: The Definitive History of the Teenage Mutant Ninja Turtles is a 2014 documentary about the Teenage Mutant Ninja Turtles franchise. It was directed by Randall Lobb.

== Cast ==
- Peter Laird
- Kevin Eastman
- Mark Askwith
- Richard Rosenbaum
- Ryan Brown
- Michael Dooney
- Steve Lavigne
- Jim Lawson
- Mark Freedman
- John Handy
- Karl Aaronian
- Fred Wolf
- David Wise
- Steve Varner
- Barry Gordon
- Cam Clarke
- Renae Jacobs
- Townsend Coleman
- James Avery
- Pat Fraley
- Peter Renaday
- Thomas K. Gray
- Bobby Herbeck
- Steve Barron
- Brian Henson
- Michelan Sisti
- Judith Hoag
- Rob Paulsen
- Michael Turney
- Kevin Clash
- Ernie Reyes Jr.
- Austin Gibson
- Charles Knauf
- Michele Ivey
- Stephen Reese
- Cindy Torres
- Michael Ian Black

== Development ==
The film was made to celebrate the 30th anniversary of the franchise. It began development in 2009, with production lasting for five years. Over one-hundred hours of interviews were examined by the filmmakers to determine whether they could be used. The trailer was released on June 11, 2014.

== Release ==
Turtle Power: The Definitive History of the Teenage Mutant Ninja Turtles was released on DVD in the United States on August 12, 2014. It was released four days after the 2014 film in the franchise.

== Reception ==
Flickering Myth awarded the film a score of two out of five stars, saying "not a definitive look, it just about scrapes the surface and that's why it's hard to recommend. It's worth watching because what it does show is great, but it will just leave you wanting more and 99 minutes just isn't enough time to cover a thirty year history." Panels and Pixels awarded it 3.5 out of 5, saying "It's an uneven package and certainly not definitive, but there's enough in there to make it worth watching."

== Sequel ==
Director Randall Lobb confirmed that a sequel is in development.
