= Teenage Mutant Ninja Turtles Adventures =

American comic book series

- Teenage Mutant Ninja Turtles Adventures No. 1 (August 1988)

Publication information
- Publisher: Archie Comics
- Schedule: Monthly
- Format: Ongoing series
- Publication date: August 1988 – October 1995
- No. of issues: 72

Creative team
- Created by: Ryan Brown; Steve Murphy; Kevin Eastman; Peter Laird
- Artist: various

Teenage Mutant Ninja Turtles Adventures is an American comic book series published by Archie Comics from 1988 to 1995. The series was aimed at a younger audience than other Teenage Mutant Ninja Turtles comics of the period, and ran for 72 issues, alongside annuals, specials, and miniseries.

== Publication history ==
Teenage Mutant Ninja Turtles Adventures debuted in August 1988 as a three-part miniseries and was aimed at a younger audience than Mirage Studios' Teenage Mutant Ninja Turtles comic book series. It initially adapted episodes from the 1987 animated television series, but by issue #5, Kevin Eastman and Peter Laird handed the comic over to Mirage artists Ryan Brown and Stephen Murphy. Under their guidance, the series moved to original storylines, often incorporating social and environmentalist themes, and introduced several new characters. The main series ran for 72 issues, ending in October 1995; in addition, there were numerous annuals, specials and, miniseries. An ongoing spinoff series, Mighty Mutanimals, features a team of supporting characters.

== Major story arcs ==
Heroes in a Half Shell: Mini-series #1–3

This mini-series adapts the first five episodes of the 1987 TV series: "Turtle Tracks", "Enter the Shredder", "A Thing About Rats", "Hot Rodding Teenagers from Dimension X", and "Shredder & Splintered". The Turtles team up with April O'Neil and confront Shredder, Krang, Bebop and Rocksteady.

Issues #1–4

This issues adapt the second-season episodes of the animated series: "Return of the Shredder" and "The Incredible Shrinking Turtles". The Eye of Sarnath plot thread is developed in future issues, where it differs from the animated series.

TMNT Adventures #7

Issues #5–11

Introduces fellow mutants, Man-Ray, Leatherhead, Wingnut and Screwloose (who later form the Mighty Mutanimals). This issues also introduce Cudley the Cowlick, Stump Asteroid and its intergalactic wrestling, the polluted Earth in the future. After returning from Stump Asteroid, the Turtles meet Wingnut and Screwloose who seek revenge on Krang for destroying their home planet Huanu, and later confront the Rat King. The Turtles battle the mutant villains, Wyrm and Scumbug, as well as the spy-turned-mutant, Chameleon. These issues offer different character origins and interpretations from those in the animated series.

Issues #12–13

The Turtles are recruited by Cherubae to battle the Malignoids, an alien, bug-like army sent out by Maligna. The battle is exploited by Stump Asteroid television. The Turtles are joined by Leatherhead, Wingnut and Screwloose, and other intergalactic wrestlers. Shredder, Krang, Bebop, and Rocksteady are connected with the alien threat, and Cherubae banishes them across the universe as punishment. Cherubae is revealed to be the sorceress who mutated Leatherhead. Then Leatherhead renounces his former role and becomes a wrestling idol on Stump Asteroid.

Issues #14–18

The Turtles return to Earth just rescue April O'Neil from poachers in the Amazon rainforest. They are aided in their tropical adventures by Jagwar, Dreadmon, and Man-Ray. Upon their return to New York City, Mondo Gecko is introduced and joins the Turtles after he mutation complicates his relationship with his girlfriend, Candy Fine.

Issues #19–20

Evil businessman, Null, sends his alien lackeys, Scul and Bean, to attack the Turtles. The Turtles, Splinter, April, and Mondo Gecko are rescued by rats which Splinter summons to chew through their ropes. Having beaten Scul and Bean to a standstill, the aliens escape (but not before Raphael and Mondo can sneak aboard their spacecraft). Together with Man-Ray, Jagwar, Dreadmon, Leatherhead, Wingnut and Screwloose (the newly formed Mighty Mutanimals), Raph and Mondo defeat the alien warlord, Maligna (this arc overlaps with the events of Mighty Mutanimals mini-series #1–3). While Raphael is away fighting with the Mighty Mutanimals, the remaining Turtles meet Chu Hsi, a firefighter in Chinatown, New York City who is empowered with an ancient Warrior Dragon (popularly known as "Hothead") spirit after an old man tries to help him by throwing some mystic East Asian substance into a burning house where the firefighter tries to help a child. Together with their new ally they defeat a giant Foot robot, which is later revealed to have been a ruse by Shredder to get the Turtles to show themselves. The Warrior Dragon defeats the giant Foot robot by throwing it on the Statue of Liberty.

Issues #21–25

April O'Neil is revealed to have obtained competence with the katana sword under Splinter's instruction, and together they aid the Turtles in their battles against Vid Vicious and Shredder. Raphael returns to help defeat Shredder and aid his friends in the final fight with Krang, who has allied with Bellybomb to take possession of Shredder's body. The alien turtle Slash battles the Turtles for the first time. The Turtles remove Krang from Shredder's body and remind Shredder he owes them.

Issues #26–27

This storyline explores environmental political issues. In The Keeper, an extraterrestrial spacecraft lands in Tibet, and out comes Boss Salvage who abducts rare animals from the Earth, among them the Yeti T'Pau who searches help by Splinter. Boss Salvage also abducts the Loch Ness Monster, Bigfoot and a merman. The reason is that he sees no future for them on the Earth because of pollution, but the Yeti persuades Boss Salvage that there still is hope, referring to all who are engaged in environmental politics. In In the Dark, animals are mutated after illegal industrial pollution in Innsmouth, Massachusetts and April makes a report about illegal pollution. She calls the turtles, and they also get help from the local teenage girl Beth Ann. The mutants want revenge on humanity, and poison the food with substances that put humans in a zombie-like state.

Mightnight Sun: Issues #28–30

Continued from the April O'Neil backup stories in issues #24–27, the Turtles, Splinter, and April travel to Japan (by stowing away aboard an airplane) to rescue Fu Sheng and Chu Hsi (Chu Hsi is the human alter ego of The Warrior Dragon from issue #20) since Chu Hsi is kidnapped by ninjas in Chinatown, New York City and sent to Hiroshima, Japan. They battle the samurai-masked villain Chien Khan (a fusion of the French word for 'dog' and the Turkish/Mongol term for 'great leader;' essentially "Dog King", since he is really an anthropomorphic dog) and his humanoid vixen warrior, Ninjara. Chien Khan forces Fu Sheng to summon the Warrior Dragon (if not he will use a knife to kill a young teenage girl, the street child Oyuki Mamisha who later becomes friend to April O' Neil) whom Chien Khan uses to brainwash with a witchcraft and destroy a nuclear power plant and set free an interdimensional demon. Chien Khan's recklessness regarding the nuclear plant enrages Ninjara, who decides to help the Turtles defeat him. Through meditation, Splinter is able to summon the ancient deities, Izanagi and Izanami, who defeat the demon and free the Warrior Dragon from Chien Khan's witchcraft. The Turtles and Ninjara defeat Chien Khan and his men before he escapes in the confusion. Ninjara has a change of heart. She decides to accompany the Turtles and leave her criminal life behind.

Issues #31–36

The heroes have further adventures in Japan, the Japanese culture and religion is studied, and gangsters who illegally make money on sumo wrestling are stopped. Raphael and Ninjara become close and April and Chu Hsi share a kiss. The Turtles, Splinter and Ninjara begin a long quest on land and sea heading west while the human characters fly back to New York City. In Tibet the heroes fight, with the help of a four armed anthropomorphic tiger named Katmandu, to protect the incarnation of a lama (who happens to be Charlie Llama, an anthropomorphic llama) from the evil Chinese wizard Mang-Thrasha who kidnapped Charlie Llama from his Crystal Palace. The Whirling Dervishes and skeleton versions of them are fought. When the group finally arrive, Charlie Llama dies while a young woman gives birth to a child. Journeying through the deserts in the Middle East, the group is attacked by Al'Falqa who believes they have stolen the Black Stone of Mecca. The sacred stone has actually been stolen by Shredder and a cat mutant, Verminator-X, from the future. The black stone is saved by the heroes before the villains disappear in a mysterious vortex-window. They also plan to kidnap Splinter, but give him back since Shredder owes the Turtles after they helped him escape from Krang.

Issue #37

Cudley the Cowlick appears in the Middle East desert before the gang and proposes to take them to Stump Asteroid for another wrestling competition. If the Turtles participate Cudley will then drop everyone back on Earth at any location they desire, including New York. The Turtles agree, compete against each other, and Donatello emerges victorious and also defeats Cryin' Houn', here known as "El Mysterio".

Issues #38–39

In a three issue crossover with the Mighty Mutanimals (one of the issues was a Mighty Mutanimals comic), the Turtles fight the Four Horsemen of the Apocalypse and Null in Brazil.

Issues #40–41

In issue #40, as he and his brothers sail home, Donatello is taken by a spirit to 1492 where he and his brothers encounter Christopher Columbus (who reached the Americas that year). The Turtles must defend the natives from Columbus' raids, but it all turns out to be in vain as the natives are either captured as slaves or die of disease. In #41, Raphael, while on a date with Ninjara to show her around New York City, is reminded of the Turtles battle against a mammoth mutant. The parts of the story in the present are drawn by Chris Allan, while the flashbacks are drawn by Ken Mitchroney, who drew the earlier issues of the comic in the era the flashbacks take place in.

The Future Shark Trilogy: Issues #42–44

The Turtles, Splinter and Ninjara are taken to the future by the future versions of Raph and Don. Don explains how in the future, some time after Splinter's death because of old age, global warming has melted the polar ice caps and left most of New York City under water. The present-day Turtles have already seen this earlier, after a mistake by Cudley the Cowlick after their first visit to the Stump Asteroid, and said it was a possible future. This created a rat problem but Don invented robot traps to eliminate the rats, much to the Rat King's chagrin. His robots won Don fame and wealth, which he used to fund his company Turtleco, along with a talented young cat mutant named Manx. Manx began to enhance himself as a cyborg named Verminator-X, obsessed with becoming immortal. Soon he and Don were archenemies.

Verminator-X, the shark mutant Armaggon, and a time displaced version of the Shredder (from issue #36) broke into Turtleco, kidnapped the future Mike and Leonardo and stole Don's experimental time slip generator. When Raph attempted to stop them, his eye was blown out by one of Armaggon's missiles. Don built another machine in order to get reinforcements in the past. Armaggon works on powering the machine with Adolf Hitler's brain, the Roswell Alien's bones and the white stone of mecca so he and his cohorts can rule all of space and time. Splinter, Ninjara and the six Turtles ambush the bad guys with a time slip, but Armaggon escapes, taking Leo as a hostage, into his machine with both Raphs and the present-day version of Don in pursuit. While the remaining Turtles battle Shredder and Verminator-X, the Rat King shows up to get his revenge on Future Don, using his powers to control Splinter. Luckily, the Turtles have a surprise ally in Merdude, tricking Verminator-X to fire his blaster, destroying the wall and letting sea water come in to free Future Leo and Mike which turns the tide in favor of the Turtles. Don and the two Raphs pursue Armaggon in a mystical swamp land some local fairies call Thantia. The two Raphs use their shared training to kick Armmagon over a waterfall. They recover Leo and escape through a time hole created by Future Don, but leave Armaggon stranded in Thantia.

All eight Turtles, Past and Future, say their goodbyes. They send Shredder back to his own time with his memories of this erased but Verminator-X escapes their custody. Before the Turtles are sent home, Future Raph bid a tearful farewell to Ninjara and gives his younger self an ominous warning about the fragility of relationships. In the final panel, we see Armaggon next to a destroyed Turtleco building, revealing Thantia is an even farther future version of Earth.

Mutations: Issue #45

Splinter reminisces back to when he was human, how Oroku Saki became the Shredder, and the events that lead him to New York and the origin of the Teenage Mutant Ninja Turtles. Splinter also reflects on their adventures with old enemies and meeting new friends (Mighty Mutanimals). Splinter catches the Turtles and Ninjara working on his surprise birthday party.

Issue #46

Ninjara's brother Naga comes to the Turtles location to tell them that the elder (Ninjara's grandmother) of their clan was captured by a hunter for sport. Raph goes with Ninjara and Naga to their homeland to confront the hunter. The hunter captures the three of them, but the elder who was captured herself frees them all. The hunter follows them, so the elder uses a Torii to open a gateway as a means of escape, but the hunter goes into the Torii after them. The gateway leads them to the underworld and they are approached by a female demon. The only way back is to go through the Torii (portal) at the edge of a cliff, but only those who are "pure of heart" can walk through the Torii and return home. The hunter walks through, but falls to his death. Then the Elder goes through the portal back to Earth; Naga, Ninjara, and Raphael follow.

Issue #47

The Turtles (minus Raphael) and Splinter race off to an emergency they saw on the news. A creature named Sarnath, who is a Triast created by the Mergia, and his pet Qark (a "dino-dog" creature with a spiked tail) were causing the disturbance. Qark was captured and the news reporter (McIntyre) who was covering the disturbance was about to reveal Qark live on TV. The Turtles and Splinter quickly help Qark escape, but for a moment Qark, the Turtles, and Splinter were caught on camera and then vanished within seconds to escape. From there the Turtles minus Splinter go with Sarnath in his spacecraft to pick up Raphael and Ninjara as they head on to Dimension X.

Black Hole Trilogy: Issues #48–50

The Turtles with Ninjara, Sarnath, and Qark begin to travel in space when they are suddenly under attack near an unstable black hole. The ship gets partially destroyed and Sarnath gets sucked into the black hole, while the Turtles are saved by the Nova Posse, who are working with the Armada to stop a greater evil. Donatello is abducted by the Sons of Silence while all that remains is his suit, which Leonardo discovers.

MEGADEATH: Mini Series (Part I of VII)

A picture of the Mighty Mutanimals is shown. A group of villains known as the Gang of Four: Waster, Fist, Dead-Eye, and Lynch, start shooting at the picture as they prepare to kill the Mutanimals.

The Sons of Silence abduct Donatello and communicate with him telepathically. Sarnath is found in the same limbo that they are in, technically located within the black hole. The Turnstone is present, which was thought to have been put out of existence (a reference back to issue #13). Donatello begins to communicate with the Turnstone. The Armada, which includes the Nova Posse, Cudley, and some more old friends, prepare to battle against Emperor Mazool, who wants to rule the rest of Dimension X. The Armada moves in and attacks as the black hole begins to double in size with no sign of stopping.

MEGADEATH: Mini Series (Part II of VII)

Future Donatello and Raphael come through a time portal to warn the Mighty Mutanimals what is going to take place. Donatello brings his equipment to help build their headquarters and make preparations to defend them from the Gang of Four. Just then the Gang of Four arrive, fully loaded, ready to take everyone out.

Terracide: Issues #55–57

The present-day Turtles are returning home in an airplane with the recently blinded Michelangelo when they are attacked by Dead-Eye. Future Don and Raph come to the present to find the Mutanimals dead and Slash attacks them. Candy stops Slash and tells of how the Mutanimals really died. After burying the Mutanimals, Future Don, Raph, Candy, and Slash head out to find the present-day Turtles. They find out that the plane carrying the Turtles crashed and the Coast Guard picked up the pilot and Mike. They land on a nearby island to come up with a plan when they are attacked by Null and his minions. The Turtles take care of the minions, while Candy is kidnapped by Null. The Turtles go after Null while present-day Leo and Don goes after Mike. The group chase Null to Maligna's Hive World hidden on the dark side of the moon. Their ship was used as a distraction while they "time slipped" their way onto the hive world. Present-day Raph leads the way and Slash attacks the hive heart, alerting Maligna of their presence. The hive attacks and they save Candy as the hive slowly plunges into the sun. Slash tells them to leave while he prevents "the insects" from repairing the ship. Slash and the hive world burn up in the sun as the Turtles escape.

Early Years: Issue #58

While in lock-up, Mike recounts how the Turtles got their colors: Three thugs stole a chip and used the sewers to escape, interrupting the Turtle's training. The thugs shot at the Turtles and the Turtles fought back. After dispatching the thugs, Master Splinter mistakenly scolded Don because they were all wearing red masks, so he couldn't tell them apart. After Mike accidentally broke a vase but wouldn't take the blame, they were all punished. They came up with a plan to take the tests that they each excelled at. Master Splinter realized their deception and came up with a plan to trick them. In the next test he only gave Mike the perfect score so that the brothers would fight amongst themselves. The thugs came back looking for the lost chip. The Turtles defeated them and turned them in to the cops. The Turtles came up with colored caps to identify themselves, but later changed to their colored masks and initialed belts.

Blind Sight: Issues #59–60

Issue #61

Cyber Samurai Mutant Ninja Turtles: Issues #62–66

Moon Eyes Saga: Issues #67–70

The Early Years: Issues #71–72

== Spin-offs ==
Archie Comics also released several spin-offs of the main Teenage Mutant Ninja Turtles Adventures title. Mighty Mutanimals featured a team made up of the Turtles' mutated animal allies. Other spin-offs included miniseries such as April O'Neil, which gave the Turtles' ally the lead role, and comics starring characters like Merdude and Leatherhead. One one-shot depicted the Turtles meeting Archie Andrews.

== Characters ==
=== Main characters ===
- Leonardo: The leader of the group. He is the most talented fighter and is closest to Master Splinter.
- Donatello: The inventor of the group, Donatello builds most of the Turtles' gadgets and vehicles. In the future, he wears a purple jacket and is seen without his mask.
- Raphael: The wisecracking jokester of the group. However, as the series progressed, he became more angry and sullen like other incarnations. In the future, Raphael wears a hat and an eye patch.
- Michelangelo: The most relaxed member of the group, he is mostly into eating pizza and goofing around with Donatello.
- Hamato Yoshi/Splinter: Sensei and surrogate father of the Turtles. Former leader of the Foot Clan in Japan. Betrayed by Shredder and mutated into a humanoid rat.
- April O'Neil: Initially reporter for Channel 6 as in TV show, but later becomes free-lance journalist. Trained by Splinter in ninjitsu and the katana.
- Oroku Saki/the Shredder: Current leader of the Foot Clan and arch-enemy of the Turtles, as well as one of the main villains of the series.

=== Supporting characters ===
- Wrestler Turtles: The wrestling costumes worn by the Turtles on the Stump Asteroid were designed by Eastman and Laird in 1983 and were actually intended as real suits for the TMNT to wear in their self-published comic book series. The idea was quickly shelved, however, and the Turtles were outfitted in their familiar costumes: bandanna, elbow and knee pads, belt, etc. Creators Brown and Murphy incorporated the discarded costumes into the Adventures title, feeling they were an important part of TMNT history, and that they should not be hidden away and forgotten in some drawer. Most notably, Raphael wore his wrestling outfit, a black full body leotard, for some time after returning from the asteroid.
- Cudley the Cowlick: An alien in the shape of a cow's head who transported the Teenage Mutant Ninja Turtles to the Stump Asteroid, where they would fight against several aliens in their wildly popular "wrestling" outfits. Mirage Studios staff artist Steve Lavigne created Cudley. As of Tales of the TMNT #52 (November 2008), Cudley was brought into Mirage continuity.
- Man-Ray: An anthropomorphic manta ray who the characters met in an adventure and was later spilled over into the Mighty Mutanimals comic book series.
- Jagwar: As his name implies, he is a jaguar-like mutant who the Turtles met when in South America. Another spillover character into Mighty Mutanimals. Jagwar was created by Mirage Studios writer Stephen Murphy and artist Michael Dooney.
- Dreadmon: A red wolf-like mutant with superhuman speed and stealth-like capabilities who guarded an Aztec temple in South America and once again spilled over into Mighty Mutanimals.
- Vid Vicious, a man with a television grafted into his body which was used to hypnotize people.
- Wingnut and Screwloose, an alien bat (Wingnut) and an alien mosquito (Screwloose) from the planet Huanu, they first met the TMNT in issue #8, where they were seen vandalizing windows before the Turtles stopped them. They appeared again in issue #13, where they briefly assisted the Turtles in battle against Maligna's Malignoids. Later on in the series, they joined the Mighty Mutanimals.
- Mondo Gecko: A teenage gecko who shares Michelangelo's affinity for skateboarding, leading them to be close friends. He later joined the Mighty Mutanimals.
- Scul and Bean, are two aliens, one with a meteorite launcher in his skull, and both with tremendous mandibles. They were generals in the army of Maligna.
- Maligna and the Malignoids, the matriarch of a vicious society of insect-like aliens who attempted to overtake Earth and one of the main antagonists of the series.
- Chien Khan, a dog-like man who controlled a large empire of ninja, whose second-in-command was a young fox-like woman named Ninjara.
- Ninjara is Chien Khan's second in command, until after the TMNT defeated Chien Khan once and for all and convinced Ninjara to join them in their battles against evil. She became one of the group for the greater part of the series afterwards and Raphael's girlfriend.
- Oyuki Mamisha is teenage girl from Japan who was up to no good, until April O' Neil and the Turtles showed her that life could be better. She became April's sidekick for the spin off-comic April O' Neil, in which Chien Khan returns to his former glory in a battle with a demon who also took control of a large group of ninja.
- The Nova Posse is a team of space adventurers from Dimension X. Their commander is Luna Azul, and the other five members are Exeen, Grotto, Rave, Trip, and Zebulon. They take care of Qark after Sarnath's fate is left unknown in issue #50.
- Tattoo is a Japanese sumo wrestler who obtained his name for having multitudes of tattoos. He asked Splinter for a favor and requested that the TMNT rescue his Chihuahua "Inky" from a group of Yakuza who wanted him to throw his next fight for gambling purposes.
- Al Falqa is a talking eagle co-created by Mirage Studios artist Jim Lawson who the Turtles encounter in Saudi Arabia.
- Katmandu is a four-armed tiger-like creature clad in ancient East Indian Armour. The Turtles encountered him in the People's Republic of China. Katmandu was created by Ryan Brown, a Mirage artist.
- Null is a businessman wearing a purple leisure suit who was ultimately responsible for the death of the Mighty Mutanimals when he contracted a group of cyborgs to kill them and one of the main villains of the series. The death was highly controversial and somewhat gory, as a spread of machine-gun bullets tore the group down. He was also responsible for a three-part story arc in the Teenage Mutant Ninja Turtles storyline including the Four Horsemen of the Apocalypse: Death, Famine, War, and Pestilence. Null himself seemed to be somehow the leader of the group, giving orders to Death, who in turn controlled the other Horsemen like puppets. Null seemed to be somehow linked to Hell. Originally the character had two small horns projecting from his forehead, and with every new deed of evil he committed he grew more demonic-looking. Eventually he grew larger horns, a demon-like tail, and wings like a bat.
- Death, Famine, War, Pestilence are the Four Horsemen of the Apocalypse.
- Armaggon, is an evil, time-traveling, talking shark who set the scale for the "Future Turtles" timeline in which the TMNT travel to the future and meet their future selves, wherein Splinter has died, and Ninjara has left Raphael, who is missing an eye.
- Monsterex is the result of Krang trying to fire a mutation ray at the Turtles and ends up hitting their television that was showing a horror movie that had a vampire, Frankenstein's monster, a werewolf that might be the Wolf Man, and a gill-man trying to rescue the Bride of Frankenstein from an unnamed mad scientist. The television was destroyed and a two-headed composite monster named Monsterex was born out of thin air. It has the left head of Frankenstein's monster, the fangs, left torso, and cape of a vampire, the right head, right torso, left hand, pants, and right leg of a werewolf, the head fins, right hand, and left foot of a Gill-man, and bandages.
- Verminator X, also known as "Manx", is half-cat, half-machine, as well as being Donatello's apprentice. He is only apparent in the future timelines, and eventually has a catharsis in a controversial book (Part 5 of the second Future Turtles storyline, based on the action figure franchise in which the Turtles have mechanized suits and rocket launcher fists) in which Raphael is willing to kill him for the greater good, resulting in destroying the machine that had taken over and poisoned Verminator X's mind. At the end of this arc, Verminator X survives and becomes good once again.
- Scumbug, is an exterminator called in to spray the Shredder's lair and is turned into a giant cockroach.
- Wyrm is a mutated monster planarian worm who fought Scumbug.
- May East, created by Stanley Wiater and Ryan Brown, is an ancient evil sorceress from whom April O'Neil is descended.
- Chameleon is a mercenary spy working for the highest bidder. He first appears in issue #9 as a well-dressed agent with a characteristic lazy eye, having stolen top secret weapons plans from the United Nations. Shredder covets these plans for himself, and sends Bebop and Rocksteady to capture Chameleon and retrieve the plans. Hiding from the authorities in the sewers, Chameleon finds himself in the middle of a battle between the two and the Turtles, and is captured after hiding the weapons plans in the sewer wall. He is then mutated into a human-sized chameleon by Shredder after divulging the whereabouts of the plans (and unsuccessfully trying to make a deal with Shredder). Using his newfound powers of camouflage and light radiance, Chameleon outsmarts Shredder, Bebop, and Rocksteady, and retrieves the plans. He then covertly returns them to the U.N., deciding that some things are just not worth profiting over. Chameleon encounters the Turtles later on in issue #51, hoping in vain to reverse his mutation.

== Collected editions ==
Archie reprinted the ongoing series in a digest format series titled Teenage Mutant Ninja Turtles Classics Digest which they published quarterly from 1993-1994, lasting 7 issues, with every digest reprinting three issues each, collecting Teenage Mutant Ninja Turtles Adventures (Vol. 2) issues #5-#25. In celebration of the Teenage Mutant Ninja Turtles' 25th Anniversary, Archie Comics released a 104-page, full-color trade paperback collection of the three issue mini-series (Vol. 1) #1–3 in 2009, which was the adaptation of the original animated show's miniseries "Heroes in a Half Shell". Mirage Studios also printed a trade for the 25th anniversary, titled Future Tense, reprinting Mighty Mutanimals #7 and TMNT Adventures #42–44 and #62–66 in July 2009 in black and white. Future Tense was released to coincide with a planned release of the storyline from Mirage entitled Forever War, but this eventually was canceled. In 2012 IDW Publishing started releasing the paperback collection of the TMNT Adventures (Vol. 2) series in 16 volumes collection. Despite including most of the run, IDW decided not to include issues #32-37 for the paperback collection due to being culturally offensive. Those issues would eventually be collected in the compendiums.

Title	Material collected	Pages	Publication date	ISBN
Teenage Mutant Ninja Turtles: Collected Series: Volume One	Teenage Mutant Ninja Turtles Adventures (Vol 2) #5–7	88	1991	1-879450-03-8
Teenage Mutant Ninja Turtles: Collected Series: Volume Two	Teenage Mutant Ninja Turtles Adventures (Vol 2) #8–10	88	1991	1-879450-04-6
Teenage Mutant Ninja Turtles: Collected Series: Volume Three	Teenage Mutant Ninja Turtles Adventures (Vol 2) #11–13	88	1991	1-879450-05-4
Teenage Mutant Ninja Turtles: Collected Series: Volume Four	Teenage Mutant Ninja Turtles Adventures (Vol 2) #14–16	88	1991	
Teenage Mutant Ninja Turtles: Volume One	Teenage Mutant Ninja Turtles Adventures (Vol 2) #5–9	120	1991	
Teenage Mutant Ninja Turtles: Heroes in a Half-Shell	Teenage Mutant Ninja Turtles Adventures (Vol 1) #1–3	104	May 27, 2009	978-1879794429
Teenage Mutant Ninja Turtles: Future Tense	Teenage Mutant Ninja Turtles Adventures (Vol 2) #42–44, 62–66, Mighty Mutanimals #7	228	July 2009	978-0981949710
Teenage Mutant Ninja Turtles Adventures: Volume 1	Teenage Mutant Ninja Turtles Adventures (Vol 2) #1–4	120	August 23, 2012	978-1613772898
Teenage Mutant Ninja Turtles Adventures: Volume 2	Teenage Mutant Ninja Turtles Adventures (Vol 2) #5–8	124	November 22, 2012	978-1613774953
Teenage Mutant Ninja Turtles Adventures: Volume 3	Teenage Mutant Ninja Turtles Adventures (Vol 2) #9–12	124	January 24, 2013	978-1613775547
Teenage Mutant Ninja Turtles Adventures: Volume 4	Teenage Mutant Ninja Turtles Adventures (Vol 2) #13–16	124	April 4, 2013	978-1613775912
Teenage Mutant Ninja Turtles Adventures: Volume 5	Teenage Mutant Ninja Turtles Adventures (Vol 2) #17–20	124	August 1, 2013	978-1613776902
Teenage Mutant Ninja Turtles Adventures: Volume 6	Teenage Mutant Ninja Turtles Adventures (Vol 2) #21–22, Mighty Mutanimals #1–3	116	January 2, 2014	978-1613778340
Teenage Mutant Ninja Turtles Adventures: Volume 7	Teenage Mutant Ninja Turtles Adventures (Vol 2) #23–27	140	May 8, 2014	978-1613779408
Teenage Mutant Ninja Turtles Adventures: Volume 8	Teenage Mutant Ninja Turtles Adventures (Vol 2) #28–31	124	September 4, 2014	978-1631400827
Teenage Mutant Ninja Turtles Adventures: Volume 9	Teenage Mutant Ninja Turtles Adventures (Vol 2) #38–40, Mighty Mutanimals #6	124	January 29, 2015	978-1631402081
Teenage Mutant Ninja Turtles Adventures: Volume 10	Teenage Mutant Ninja Turtles Adventures (Vol 2) #41–44, Mighty Mutanimals #7	144	October 8, 2015	978-1631403842
Teenage Mutant Ninja Turtles Adventures: Volume 11	Teenage Mutant Ninja Turtles Adventures (Vol 2) #45–50	164	March 22, 2016	978-1631405624
Teenage Mutant Ninja Turtles Adventures: Volume 12	Teenage Mutant Ninja Turtles Adventures (Vol 2) #51–54	128	September 27, 2016	978-1631407130
Teenage Mutant Ninja Turtles Adventures: Volume 13	Teenage Mutant Ninja Turtles Adventures (Vol 2) #55–57, Mighty Mutanimals #8–9	144	May 9, 2017	978-1631408854
Teenage Mutant Ninja Turtles Adventures: Volume 14	Teenage Mutant Ninja Turtles Adventures (Vol 2) #58–61	120	November 21, 2017	978-1684050734
Teenage Mutant Ninja Turtles Adventures: Volume 15	Teenage Mutant Ninja Turtles Adventures (Vol 2) #62-66	136	July 3, 2018	978-1684051724
Teenage Mutant Ninja Turtles Adventures: Volume 16	Teenage Mutant Ninja Turtles Adventures (Vol 2) #67-72	152	December 18, 2018	978-1684053711
Teenage Mutant Ninja Turtles Adventures Compendium: Volume 1	Teenage Mutant Ninja Turtles Adventures (Vol 1) #1–3, Teenage Mutant Ninja Turtles Adventures (Vol 2) #1–17, and more: "Origin of the Species" and "Red Sails in the Sunset" from TMNT Meet Archie #1; "Metamorphosis" from TMNT Adventures, Vol. 1; "A Forgotten TMNT Adventure" from Mirage Mini Comics Collection; "The Night of Monsterex" from TMNT Adventures Special #3; "Yo-Ho-Ho! And a Bottle of Mutagen!" from TMNT Adventures Special #5; "Doomsday Hassle in Banshee Castle" from TMNT Adventures Special #6; "Zen Million Year to Birth" from TMNT Adventures Special #10	784	April 29, 2025	979-8887240855
Teenage Mutant Ninja Turtles Adventures Compendium: Volume 2	Teenage Mutant Ninja Turtles Adventures (Vol 2) #18-26, and more: Mighty Mutanimals (Vol 1) #1–3; "Ori "Monsters Are the Rage!" from TMNT Adventures Special #3; "Louie's Pasture" and "Pig Heaven" from TMNT Adventures Special #4; "The Darkest Hour" from TMNT Adventures Special #5; "The Darkest Hour II" from TMNT Adventures Special #6; "It Takes Guts..." from TMNT Adventures Special #7; "Cleaver's Critters" from TMNT Adventures Special #8; "Full Circle" from TMNT Adventures Special #9; April O'Neil: The May East Saga #1–3	680	May 13, 2026	979-8887243931
Teenage Mutant Ninja Turtles Adventures Compendium: Volume 3	Teenage Mutant Ninja Turtles Adventures (Vol 2) #27-35, and more: "If a Tree Falls..." and "The Last Sea Serpent" from TMNT Adventures Special #1; "The Wrath of the Fire God" and "The Ghost of 13 Mile Island!" from TMNT Adventures Special #2; "It Started in...Chinatown," "Dragon Rage," "Questions," and "The White Ninja" from TMNT Adventures #24-27; TMNT Presents April O'Neil #1–3	575	December 15, 2026	
Teenage Mutant Ninja Turtles Adventures Compendium: Volume 4	Teenage Mutant Ninja Turtles Adventures (Vol 2) #36–45, and more: Mighty Mutanimals (Vol 2) #1–9; "Paper or Plastic?" from TMNT 30th Anniversary Special; "The Return of…Monsterex!" from TMNT Adventures Special #7	576	April 13, 2027	
