= Gizmo (Mirage Studios) =

Black and white comic book series

- A pin-up page dedicated to Frank Herbert from Gizmo #2 June 1986. Art by Michael Dooney
- Hero: Gizmo Sprocket; Fluffy Brockleton

Gizmo is a black and white comic book series created, written, and illustrated by Michael Dooney first published by Chance Enterprises, and later published by Mirage Studios in May 1986. It tells about the story of two space adventurers: Gizmo Sprocket, a robot with a cool attitude, and Fluffy Brockleton, an anthropomorphic dog. They are accompanied by Soto, a sentient, pan-dimensional space vehicle that resembles a trailer truck. Gizmo has crossed over with the character Fugitoid from Teenage Mutant Ninja Turtles.

== Bibliography ==
- Gizmo (vol. 1, published by Chance) #1
- Gizmo (vol. 2, published by Mirage) #1-6 (#4 includes reprint of the story from Gizmo vol. 1 #1 with a new frontispiece, and reprint changes the design of Gizmo's shirt)
- Gizmo and the Fugitoid #1-2 (co-written by Peter Laird, lettering by Steve Lavigne)
- Domino Chance #7-8 (back-up stories "Our Hero, Gizmo Sprocket esq." and "Shopping Spree")
- Michelangelo microseries #1 (back-up story "One Unconventional Robot", first printing only)
- Gobbledygook (vol. 2) #1 (reprints "Shopping Spree" short story from Domino Chance #8)
- Grunts #1 (short story "Monuments" features Fluffy)
- The Collected Gizmo TPB (Gizmo vol. 2 #1-6, "One Unconventional Robot" short story from the Michelangelo microseries, "Monuments" from Grunts #1, and the new story "King for a Day")
- Mirage Mini Comics Collection (mini comic "Reflections on a Metal Face")
- Teenage Mutant Ninja Turtles (Mirage Studios) (vol. 1) #47 (one-panel cameo by Fluffy, inked by Keith Aiken, lettered by Mary Kelleher)
- Plastron Cafe #1 (short story "Sirensong", lettered by Mary Kelleher)
- Teenage Mutant Ninja Turtles (Mirage Studios) (vol. 4) #6 (back-up story "A Few Small Repairs")
- Tales of the TMNT (vol.2) #33 (one-panel cameo by Gizmo and Fluffy in the back-up story "Credo". Written by Will Tupper, art by Eric Theriault, lettering by Erik Swanson)

== See also ==
- Mirage Studios
