= Teenage Mutant Ninja Turtles (Mirage Studios) =

American comic book series

- Cover of the second print of Teenage Mutant Ninja Turtles #4. Art by Michael Dooney.

Publication information
- Publisher: Mirage Studios
- Genre: Superhero
- Publication date: 1984–2014
- Main character(s): Leonardo; Raphael; Donatello; Michaelangelo

Creative team
- Created by: Kevin Eastman; Peter Laird

Teenage Mutant Ninja Turtles (TMNT) is a comic book series that was published by Mirage Studios between 1984 and 2014. Conceived by Kevin Eastman and Peter Laird, it was intended as a one-shot, but due to its popularity it became an ongoing series. The comic created the Turtles franchise of five television series, seven feature films, numerous video games, and a range of toys and merchandise.

Notable for its black and white format and darker tone compared to later adaptations, the series follows the exploits of four genetically mutated turtles trained in ninjutsu and martial arts by the mutated rat sensei Splinter to combat various foes, most notably the evil ninja clan known only as the "Foot", and their leader Oroku Saki, the samurai-esque "Shredder".

Over the years, the Turtles have appeared in numerous cross-overs with other independent comics characters such as Dave Sim's Cerebus, Bob Burden's Flaming Carrot, Stan Sakai's Usagi Yojimbo, Image Universe series including Erik Larsen's Savage Dragon and Todd McFarlane's Spawn.

In October 2009, Laird sold the rights to the Teenage Mutant Ninja Turtles franchise to Viacom, the parent company of Nickelodeon. Mirage Studios was shut down on September 19, 2021. In 2011, IDW Publishing secured the rights to publish a new series and reprint the older comics.

== Origin of the concept ==
The concept originated from a comical drawing sketched out by Kevin Eastman during a casual evening of brainstorming with his friend Peter Laird. The drawing of a short, squat turtle wearing a mask with nunchaku strapped to its arms was humorous to the young artists, as it played upon the inherent contradiction of a slow, cold-blooded reptile with the speed and agility of Japanese martial arts. Laird suggested that they create a team of four such turtles, each specialising in a different weapon. Eastman and Laird often cited the work of Frank Miller and Jack Kirby as their major artistic influences.

With money from a tax refund and a loan from Eastman's uncle, they formed Mirage Studios and self-published a single-issue comic book that combined their original idea with elements meant to pastiche four popular comics of the early 1980s: Marvel Comics' The New Mutants, which featured teenage mutants; Cerebus, which featured anthropomorphic animals; Ronin; and Daredevil, which featured ninja clans duelling for control of the New York City underworld.

The Turtles' origin had direct allusions to Daredevil: the traffic accident between a blind man and a truck carrying radioactive ooze is identical to Daredevil's own story (and in fact, in the first issue relating the Turtles' birth, Splinter sees the canister strike a boy's face). The name "Splinter" served to parody Daredevil's mentor Stick. The Foot, a clan of evil ninjas who became the Turtles' archenemies, satirises the Hand, a mysterious and deadly ninja clan in the pages of Daredevil.

Eastman and Laird originally wanted to give their characters Japanese names to fit the theme, but as Laird explained, "we couldn't think of authentic-sounding Japanese names". Instead, they went with Renaissance artists, and picked the four they were most familiar with, with the help of Laird's copy of Janson's History of Art.

== Publication history ==
=== Volume 1: 1984–1993 ===
The first issue of Teenage Mutant Ninja Turtles was advertised in issues #1 and #2 of Eastman and Laird's 1984 comic, Gobbledygook, in addition to the Comics Buyer's Guide, issue 545. The full page advertisement in CBG helped gain the attention of retailers and jump-started their early sales. Because of the CBG's newspaper format, many were disposed of, making it a highly sought-after collector's item today. The book premiered in May 1984 at a comic book convention in Portsmouth, New Hampshire. It was printed in an oversized, magazine-style format using black and white artwork on cheap newsprint and had a print run of only 3,275 copies. It was a period of intense speculation in comic book investment, with especially strong interest in black and white comics from independent companies. The first printings of the original TMNT comics had small print runs that made them instant collector items. Within months, the books were trading at prices over 50 times their cover price.

The success also led to a black-and-white comics boom in the mid-1980s, wherein other small publishers put out animal-based parody books hoping to make a quick profit. Among them, the Adolescent Radioactive Black Belt Hamsters, the Pre-Teen Dirty-Gene Kung Fu Kangaroos, and the Karate Kreatures were obvious parodies of TMNT. Even Marvel Comics featured an advertisement for Adult Thermonuclear Samurai Elephants in 1986, but it evolved into an X-Men parody eventually released as Power Pachyderms in 1989. Most of them were sold to comic shops in large numbers, but failed to catch on with readers. This speculation led to financial problems with both comic shops and distributors, contributing to a sales collapse in 1986–87.

The "Return to New York" story arc concluded in the spring of 1989 and by this time the Ninja Turtles phenomenon was well established in other media. Eastman and Laird then found themselves administrating an international merchandising juggernaut, overseeing a wide array of licensing deals. This prevented the two creators from participating in the day-to-day work of writing and illustrating a monthly comic book. For this reason, many guest artists were invited to showcase their unique talents in the TMNT universe. The breadth of diversity found in the various short stories had the adverse effect of somewhat disrupting continuity and gave the series a disjointed, anthology-like feel. Some of these artists, including Michael Dooney, Eric Talbot, A.C. Farley, Ryan Brown, Steve Lavigne, Steve Murphy, and Jim Lawson, continued to work with Mirage Studios for years to come.

Issue #45 kicked off a major turning point, as Mirage made a concerted effort to return the series to continuity. A 13-part story arc entitled "City at War" began with issue #50, which was the first issue to be completely written and illustrated by both Eastman and Laird since issue #11. Both "City at War" and Volume 1 concluded with the publication of issue #62 in August 1993.

=== Volume 2: 1993–1995 ===
Mirage Studios launched Volume 2 with much fanfare in October 1993, as a full-color series that maintained the continuity of the first volume. Written and illustrated by Jim Lawson, the series lasted only thirteen issues before ceasing publication in October 1995. The cancellation was due to declining popularity and lagging sales as well as a flood at Mirage Studios.

=== Volume 3: 1996–1999, 2018 ===
Volume 3, issue #10. Cover art by Frank Fosco and Erik Larsen.

The Savage Dragon creator Erik Larsen relaunched the series in June 1996, with the publication of a third volume under the Image Comics banner. The series was written by Gary Carlson and drawn by Frank Fosco and marked the return to black and white artwork. This volume was notable for having a faster pace and more intense action while inflicting major physical changes on the Turtles themselves; Leonardo losing a hand, Raphael's face being scarred, Splinter transforming into a bat, and Donatello becoming a cyborg. In a plot twist, Raphael even usurped the identity of the Shredder and assumed leadership of the Foot. With Volume 3, the Turtles were incorporated into the Image Universe, which provided opportunities for a few crossovers and guest appearances by characters from Image series.

The series ceased publication on a cliffhanger in 1999 with issue #23, and it was no longer considered part of the "official" TMNT canon due in part to a lack of desire by co-creator Peter Laird to follow up material with which he was not directly involved nor fully approved. Raph's depiction as the Shredder, however, was referenced in an episode of the third season of the 2003 animated series, "The Darkness Within", where Raph was exposed to his fear of giving into anger and becoming the very thing he hated.

After its cancellation, the series remained in publication limbo for nearly two decades, with no reprints or collected volumes. In 2018, IDW Publishing, which publishes their own TMNT comic series, began to reprint the existing 23 issues in full color under the title TMNT: Urban Legends, as well as commission Carlson and Fosco to write and draw an official three-issue conclusion to the story.

=== Volume 4: 2001–2014 ===
Peter Laird and Jim Lawson brought the Turtles back to their roots with the simply-titled TMNT in December 2001. Published bi-monthly, the series took the opportunity to correct a persistent error: since the first issue of Volume 1, Michelangelo's name had been misspelled as "Michaelangelo". It is now spelled correctly, consistent with his Renaissance namesake Michelangelo Buonarroti.

Picking up fifteen years after the conclusion of Volume 2 (and omitting the events of Volume 3), the Turtles, now in their early thirties, are living together in their sewer lair beneath New York City. April and Casey have been married for some time and remain in contact with the Turtles from their nearby apartment. Splinter continues to live at the Northampton farmhouse, where he has become a "grandfather" of sorts to Casey's teenage daughter, Shadow. The Utroms return to Earth in a very public arrival, subsequently establishing a peaceful base in Upper New York Bay. Since the arrival, aliens — and other bizarre lifeforms, like the Turtles — have become more accepted within society. No longer forced to live in hiding, the Turtles can now roam freely among the world of humans, albeit under the guise of being aliens.

The series continued until the acquisition of the franchise by Viacom in 2009. As part of the sale, Peter Laird was allowed to continue Volume 4, but issues were released sporadically, as they had been in the months before the sale. Issue no. 31 was originally released as an online comic only, while issue no. 32 was released for the 2014 Free Comic Book Day, almost 4 years after issue no. 31 was released online. Issue no. 31 was released in print for the first time for Free Comic Book Day 2015. Peter Laird retained the rights to publish 18 issues a year, though Mirage Studios was shut down on September 19, 2021. While the series has never been officially canceled, a continuation is currently unlikely.

Even when Mirage Studios was still active, no reprints or collected volumes were ever made. In 2025, IDW began to reprint the existing issues under the title TMNT: Journeys, as well as commission Eastman to create a brand-new variant cover to accompany the first issue. This reprint run is still ongoing, and what will happen to this series when it reprints all existing issues is currently unknown.

== Related comics ==
During the early days of the franchise, each of the four turtles received their own one-shot (or "micro-series"), plus a one-shot featuring the Fugitoid. There was also a one-shot anthology, Turtle Soup, released in 1987, which led to a four-part series of the same name in 1991–92. The Turtles had a four-issue mini-series co-starring Flaming Carrot (the Turtles previously guest-starred in issues #25–27 of the Carrot's own Dark Horse-published series), and the Fugitoid teamed up with Mirage regular Michael Dooney's creator-owned character Gizmo for a two-issue limited series. Kevin Eastman and Rick Veitch created a story starring Casey Jones, which was initially serialized in the four-issue anthology series Plastron Cafe, and later colorized and released with a previously unseen conclusion in the two-part Casey Jones mini-series. Eastman then collaborated with Simon Bisley on a mini-series that was supposed to be released by Mirage under the title Casey Jones & Raphael, but after one issue, it was released by Image under the title Bodycount as a four-part mini-series which began with an expanded version of the sole Mirage-published issue.

== Collected books ==
The first collected volumes were released by First Publishing, who published four volumes from 1986 to 1988, collecting colorized versions of issues #1–11, plus the one-shot Leonardo #1 (the other three micro series one-shots were not included).

In 1988, Mirage Studios released Teenage Mutant Ninja Turtles Collected Book Volume One, collecting issues #1–11, and the four micro series one-shots. It was available only by mail order directly from Mirage, either as a trade paperback at US $20 (with cover art by Peter Laird; 5,000 copies printed) or as a limited edition hardcover at US $100 (with cover art by Kevin Eastman, 1,000 copies, signed by Eastman and Laird). Between 1990 and 1991, Mirage Studios published seven volumes of The Collected Teenage Mutant Ninja Turtles trade paperbacks, reprinting mostly consecutive issues #1-#29 and the four micro series one-shots, with all books featuring new cover art from artist A.C. Farley. The cover price for Volume 1 was US $16.95 due to this book containing the most issues reprinted, with volumes 2–7 at US $6.95 each, containing an average of three issues reprinted.

As part of the 25th-anniversary celebrations in 2009, with no new reprint collected books released in many years and long out of print, Mirage published a new trade paperback Teenage Mutant Ninja Turtles, Collected Book Volume 1 which was released in July 2009 with a cover price of US $29.95, unlike previous editions collecting issues #1–11, plus the four micro series one-shots, this new edition included reprinting Fugitoid issue #1, and some bonus material.

A new hardcover deluxe reprint collection was published by IDW Publishing, which had been given the Teenage Mutant Ninja Turtles rights from Viacom in 2011, including reprinting the older comics.

=== Mirage Publishing ===
- TMNT Collected Book Volume One (Limited Edition Hard Cover, 1988), collecting Vol. 1 #1–11, plus Raphael #1, Michelangelo #1, Donatello #1, and Leonardo #1 (1,000 copies only, all signed by Kevin Eastman and Peter Laird)
- TMNT Collected Book Volume One (trade paperback, 1988; 5,000 copies printed), collecting Vol. 1 #1–11, plus Raphael #1, Michelangelo #1, Donatello #1, and Leonardo #1
- The Collected Teenage Mutant Ninja Turtles Volume 1, collecting Vol. 1 #1–11, plus Raphael #1, Michaelangelo #1, Donatello #1, and Leonardo #1 (trade paperback, March 1990)
- Teenage Mutant Ninja Turtles, Collected Book Volume 1, collects Vol. 1 #1–11, plus Raphael #1, Michaelangelo #1, Donatello #1, Leonardo #1, and Fugitoid #1, and bonus material. (July 2009; 606 Pages, ISBN 0-9819497-0-3)
- The Collected Teenage Mutant Ninja Turtles Volume 2, collecting Vol. 1 #12–14 (May 1990)
- The Collected Teenage Mutant Ninja Turtles Volume 3, collecting Vol. 1 #15, 17–18 (June 1990)
- The Collected Teenage Mutant Ninja Turtles Volume 4, collecting Vol. 1 #19–21 (October 1990)
- The Collected Teenage Mutant Ninja Turtles Volume 5, collecting Vol. 1 #16, 22–23 (November 1990)
- The Collected Teenage Mutant Ninja Turtles Volume 6, collecting Vol. 1 #24–26 (July 1991)
- The Collected Teenage Mutant Ninja Turtles Volume 7, collecting Vol. 1 #27–29 (November 1991)
- TMNT: Soul's Winter, collecting Vol. 1 #31, 35–36 (February 2007)
- Shell Shock, collecting short stories by various authors and artists (December 1989)
- Challenges, by Michael Dooney (1991)
- TMNT: The Collected Movie Books, Collects the movie comics: TMNT Movie Prequel #1 – Raphael, TMNT Movie Prequel #2 – Michaelangelo, TMNT Movie Prequel #3 – Donatello, TMNT Movie Prequel #4 – April, TMNT Movie Prequel #5 – Leonardo, TMNT Movie Adaptation (June 2007)

=== First Publishing ===
- Teenage Mutant Ninja Turtles: Book I, collecting colorized versions of Vol. 1 #1–3 (November 1986)
- Teenage Mutant Ninja Turtles: Book II, collecting colorized versions of Vol. 1 #4–6 (June 1987)
- Teenage Mutant Ninja Turtles: Book III, collecting colorized versions of Vol. 1 #7–9, along with the short story "Stompers" (December 1987)
- Teenage Mutant Ninja Turtles: Book IV, collecting colorized versions of Leonardo #1 and Vol. 1 #10–11 (November 1988)

=== Image Comics ===
- Teenage Mutant Ninja Turtles TPB-collecting Vol. 3 #1–5
- Bodycount TPB -collecting Bodycount #1–4 miniseries by Kevin Eastman and Simon Bisley

=== Heavy Metal ===
- Bodycount TPB (2008 rerelease) – collecting Bodycount #1–4 miniseries by Kevin Eastman and Simon Bisley (This reprint edition is in magazine-sized dimension not comics sized)
- Teenage Mutant Ninja Turtles – 25th Anniversary: A Quarter Century Celebration (Selected reprints with some stories colored)

=== IDW Comics ===
- Teenage Mutant Ninja Turtles: The Ultimate Collection Vol. 1, collecting Mirage Studios' Vol. 1 issues #1–7, and Raphael #1 (December 2011)
- Teenage Mutant Ninja Turtles: The Ultimate Collection Vol. 2, collecting Mirage Studios' Vol. 1 issues #8–11, along with the Michaelangelo, Leonardo, and Donatello "micro-series" one-shots (April 2012)
- Teenage Mutant Ninja Turtles: The Ultimate Collection Vol. 3, collecting Mirage Studios' Vol. 1 issues #12, 14, 15, 17, and 19–21 (August 2012)
- Teenage Mutant Ninja Turtles: The Ultimate Collection Vol. 4, collecting Mirage Studios' Vol. 1 issues #48–55 (April 2013)
- Teenage Mutant Ninja Turtles: The Ultimate Collection Vol. 5, collecting Mirage Studios' Vol. 1 issues #56–62 (October 2013)
- Teenage Mutant Ninja Turtles: The Ultimate Collection Vol. 6, collecting various short stories/one-shots published between 1985 and 1989 (January 2016)
- Teenage Mutant Ninja Turtles Black & White Classics Vol. 1, collecting Mirage Studios' Vol. 1 issues #1–3, and Raphael #1 (June 2012)
- Teenage Mutant Ninja Turtles Black & White Classics Vol. 2, collecting Mirage Studios' Vol. 1 issues #4–7 (June 2012)
- Teenage Mutant Ninja Turtles Black & White Classics Vol. 3, collecting Mirage Studios' Vol. 1 issue #9, along with the Michaelangelo and Donatello "micro-series" one-shots (June 2012)
- Teenage Mutant Ninja Turtles Black & White Classics Vol. 4, collecting Mirage Studios' Vol. 1 issues #10–11 and the Leonardo "micro-series" one-shot (June 2012)
- Teenage Mutant Ninja Turtles Classics Vol. 1, collecting colorized versions of Mirage Studios' Vol. 1 issue #13 along with a collection of stories from the Shell Shock TP; "Bottoming Out", "New York Ninja", "Word Warriors", "49th Street Stompers", "Junkman", "O Deed", "Road Trip", "Don't Judge a Book", "A Splinter in the Eye of God?", "Night Life", and "Meanwhile... 1,000,000 B.C.". (June 2012)
- Teenage Mutant Ninja Turtles Classics Vol. 2, collecting colorized versions of Mirage Studios' Vol. 1 issues #16, 22, and 23 (August 2012)
- Teenage Mutant Ninja Turtles Classics Vol. 3, collecting colorized versions of Mirage Studios' Vol. 1 issues #27–29 (December 2012)
- Teenage Mutant Ninja Turtles Classics Vol. 4, collecting colorized versions of Mirage Studios' Vol. 1 issues #32, 33, and 37 along with “The Ring” (from Turtle Soup Vol. 2 Book One) (March 2013)
- Teenage Mutant Ninja Turtles Classics Vol. 5, collecting colorized versions of Mirage Studios' Vol. 1 issues #34 and #38–40 (May 2013)
- Teenage Mutant Ninja Turtles Classics Vol. 6, collecting colorized versions of Mirage Studios' Vol. 1 issues #42–44 (August 2013)
- Teenage Mutant Ninja Turtles Classics Vol. 7, collecting colorized versions of Mirage Studios' Vol. 1 issues #45–47 and six short stories from Shell Shock: "Ghouls Night Out", "Crazy Man", "The Survival Game", "The Howl", "Technofear", and "It's A Gas" (November 2013)
- Teenage Mutant Ninja Turtles Classics Vol. 8, collecting Mirage Studios' Vol. 2 issues #1–5 (May 2014)
- Teenage Mutant Ninja Turtles Classics Vol. 9, collecting Mirage Studios' Vol. 2 issues #6–9 (December 2014)
- Teenage Mutant Ninja Turtles Classics Vol. 10, collecting Mirage Studios' Vol. 2 issues #10–13 (April 2015)
- Teenage Mutant Ninja Turtles: Legends, Soul's Winter collecting colorized versions of Mirage Studios' Vol. 1 issues #31, 35-36 and the short stories "A Splinter in the Eye of God", "Failed Instant", and "O-Deed". (December 2014)
- Teenage Mutant Ninja Turtles: The Works, Vol. 1, collecting colorized versions of Mirage Studios' Vol. 1 issues #1–7, and Raphael #1 (May 2013)
- Teenage Mutant Ninja Turtles: The Works, Vol. 2, collecting colorized versions of Mirage Studios' Vol. 1 issues #8–11, Michaelangelo #1, Donatello #1, and Leonardo #1 (October 2013)
- Teenage Mutant Ninja Turtles: The Works, Vol. 3, collecting colorized versions of Mirage Studios' Vol. 1 issues #12, #14–15, #17, and #19–21 (September 2014)
- Teenage Mutant Ninja Turtles: The Works, Vol. 4, collecting colorized versions of Mirage Studios' Vol. 1 issues #48–55 (December 2015)
- Teenage Mutant Ninja Turtles: The Works, Vol. 5, collecting colorized versions of Mirage Studios' Vol. 1 issues #56–62 (August 2016)
- Teenage Mutant Ninja Turtles Color Classics, Vol.1, collecting colorized versions of Mirage Studios' Vol. 1 issues #1–7, Raphael #1 and Michaelangelo #1 (April 2018)
- Teenage Mutant Ninja Turtles Color Classics, Vol.2, collecting colorized versions of Mirage Studios' Vol. 1 issues #8-13, Donatello #1 and Leonardo #1 (May 2019)
- Teenage Mutant Ninja Turtles Color Classics, Vol.3, collecting colorized versions of Mirage Studios' Vol. 1 issues #14-21 (May 2020)
- Tales of the Teenage Mutant Ninja Turtles Omnibus, Vol. 1, collected colorized versions of 'Tales of TMNT, 1st series' and issues 1-8 of Tales of the TMNT, Vol 2. (May 2018)
- Tales of the Teenage Mutant Ninja Turtles, Vol. 1 collected colorized versions of Tales of the TMNT, Vol 1, issues #1-4 (February 2013)
- Tales of the Teenage Mutant Ninja Turtles, Vol. 2 collected colorized versions of Tales of the TMNT, Vol 1, issues #5-7 (April 2013)
- Tales of the Teenage Mutant Ninja Turtles, Vol. 3 collected colorized versions of Tales of the TMNT, Vol 2, issues #1-4 (October 2013)
- Tales of the Teenage Mutant Ninja Turtles, Vol. 4 collected colorized versions of Tales of the TMNT, Vol 2, issues #5-8 (May 2014)
- Tales of the Teenage Mutant Ninja Turtles, Vol. 5 collected colorized versions of Tales of the TMNT, Vol 2, issues #9-12 (August 2014)
- Tales of the Teenage Mutant Ninja Turtles, Vol. 6 collected colorized versions of Tales of the TMNT, Vol 2, issues #13-16 (November 2014)
- Tales of the Teenage Mutant Ninja Turtles, Vol. 7 collected colorized versions of Tales of the TMNT, Vol 2, issues #17-20 (July 2015)
- Tales of the Teenage Mutant Ninja Turtles, Vol. 8 collected colorized versions of Tales of the TMNT, Vol 2, issues #22-25 (April 2016)
- Teenage Mutant Ninja Turtles: Urban Legends, Vol. 1 collecting Image Comics' Vol. 3 issues #1-13 (August 2019)
- Teenage Mutant Ninja Turtles: Urban Legends, Vol. 2 collecting Image Comics' Vol. 3 issues #14-23 and issues #23-26 of Urban Legends (Jun 2021)
- Teenage Mutant Ninja Turtles Compendium, Vol. 1 collecting Mirage Studios' Vol. 1 issues #1–7 and 9–14; the Raphael #1, Michaelangelo #1, Donatello #1, and Leonardo #1; Fugitoid #1; and Tales of TMNT #1–5 (October 2022)
- Teenage Mutant Ninja Turtles Compendium, Vol. 2 collecting Mirage Studios' Vol. 1 issues #15–23, #27–29, and #31–37; Tales of the TMNT #6-7; and the short story The Ring (October 2023)
- Teenage Mutant Ninja Turtles Compendium, Vol. 3 collecting Mirage Studios' Vol. 1 issues #38-62 (September 2024)
- Teenage Mutant Ninja Turtles: The Mirage Years 1993-1995 collecting Mirage Studios' Vol. 2 issues #1-13 (February 2025)

== Appearance in other media ==
=== Comics ===
The ongoing IDW continuity features two minor cross-references with the Mirage comics in Bebop & Rocksteady Destroy Everything! #1, where its intro sequence connects to the story from the Tales of the TMNT issue Vol.1 #7: "The Return of Savanti Romero", and in Teenage Mutant Ninja Turtles/Usagi Yojimbo, where the previous encounters between Miyamoto Usagi and the Mirage Turtles are mentioned in one scene.

=== Animation ===
The Teenage Mutant Ninja Turtles cartoon series that debuted in 2003 ended with Turtles Forever, a crossover movie with two other Turtles properties: the 1987 cartoon and the universe of the original Mirage comics. A similar idea was used for the 2012 cartoon's episode "Transdimensional Turtles" with the 2012 cartoon iterations replacing their 2003 counterparts. In both specials, an interdimensional plot-launched by the 2003 Utrom Shredder in Forever and 1987 Krang and the 2012 Kraang in Transdimensional-involved the Mirage Comics world. This reality is referred to as Turtle Prime or the Primary Turtle Dimension, the destruction of which would set off a chain reaction wiping out all other Turtles and potentially their realities.
