= Creator's Bill of Rights =

1988 document drafted by independent comic book artists

The Creator's Bill of Rights (officially, A Bill of Rights for Comics Creators) is a document drafted in November 1988 by a number of independent comic book artists, writers, and publishers, designed to protect their rights as creators and publishers and oppose exploitation by corporate work for hire practices and the power of distributors to dictate the means of distribution. Issues covered by the Bill included giving creators proper credit for their characters and stories, profit-sharing, distribution, fair contracts, licensing, and return of original artwork. The signing of the Bill spurred Cerebus creator and self-publisher Dave Sim and Teenage Mutant Ninja Turtles creators/self-publishers Kevin Eastman and Peter Laird to sell or continue selling collected volumes of their comics directly to readers via their periodic issues, rather than through direct market distributors selling the collections at comic book specialty shops. Comic book professionals that have commented on the Bill conclude that it had little or no impact on the comic book industry.

== History ==
=== Antecedents ===
Creator's rights has long been a source of conflict in the American comics industry, going back to the medium's late 1930s origins. Creator-owned titles began to appear during the late-1960s underground comix movement, including the publishing collective Cartoonists Co-Op Press, and the Robert Crumb-led United Cartoon Workers of America. Similar movements began in the superhero genre with the mid-1970s creation of the short-lived company Atlas/Seaboard Comics.

During the 1970s, superstar artist Neal Adams was politically active in the industry, and attempted to unionize its creative community. In 1978, Adams helped form the Comics Creators Guild, which over three dozen comic-book writers and artists joined, including Cary Bates, Howard Chaykin, Chris Claremont, Steve Ditko, Michael Golden, Archie Goodwin, Paul Levitz, Bob McLeod, Frank Miller, Carl Potts, Marshall Rogers, Jim Shooter, Walt Simonson, Jim Starlin, Len Wein, and Marv Wolfman.

Around this same period, industry legend Jack Kirby, co-creator of many of Marvel Comics' most popular characters, came into dispute with the company over the disappearance of original pages of artwork from some of his most famous and popular titles. Kirby had quit working for Marvel in 1979, angry over what he perceived as the company's mistreatment of him. Best-selling creators like Alan Moore, Frank Miller, and many other stars became vocal advocates for Kirby. Neal Adams also petitioned to have his Marvel originals returned, and the pair won their battle in 1987, when Marvel returned original artwork to him and Kirby, among others. This decision helped lead to the modern industry's standard practice of returning original artwork to the artist, who can earn additional income from art sales to collectors.

Alan Moore himself became increasingly concerned at the lack of creator's rights in British comics. In 1985, he noted that he had stopped working for all British publishers except IPC, publishers of 2000 AD, "purely for the reason that IPC so far have avoided lying to me, cheating me or generally treating me like crap". He joined other British creators in decrying the wholesale relinquishing of all rights, and in 1986 stopped writing for 2000 AD as well. Moore's outspoken opinions and principles, particularly on the subject of creator's rights and ownership, would see him burn bridges with a number of other publishers over the course of his career.

=== Rise of the independents ===
Other creators' similar and repeated clashes with DC Comics, First Comics, and other publishers led to an industry-wide debate about the issue. On the other side, independent publishers of the early 1980s like Pacific Comics and Eclipse Comics were strong promoters of creator-owned properties; their enticement of popular creators (such as Kirby) to their pages helped push the issue to the fore and put pressure on industry giants Marvel and DC. In fact, in the fall of 1988, shortly before the signing of the Creator's Bill of Rights, DC revised the company's work-for-hire agreements to give more power to individual creators.

=== Dave Sim vs Diamond Distributors ===
The impetus for the creation of the Bill was a dispute between publisher Dave Sim and Diamond Comics Distribution. Sim was motivated to bring together the eventual signatories to the Bill by a 1987 incident surrounding The Puma Blues, a comic book published through his company Aardvark One International. Sim had fallen into dispute with Diamond Comics Distribution over Sim's decision to sell directly to his readership instead of using Diamond to distribute the Cerebus graphic novel High Society. By selling directly to readers and bypassing Diamond and other distributors, Sim made a profit of $100,000. In response, Diamond National Account Representative Bill Schanes informed Sim: "If it is your intention to pick and choose which products you want distributors to carry, it should be our privilege to choose what we wish to distribute. Therefore, it is our feeling we should no longer carry and promote Puma Blues". At that time, Diamond distributed an estimated 33% of the series' print run. Ironically, Schanes had formerly been publisher of Pacific Comics, itself an extremely creator-friendly publisher.

Sim soon enlisted the support of self-publishers, Mirage Studios founders, and Teenage Mutant Ninja Turtles creators Kevin Eastman and Peter Laird, both of whom also used Diamond as a distributor. Not including Eastman and Laird, ten of the eventual signatories to the Bill worked for Mirage, including Rick Veitch and Mark Martin. Signatories Gerhard and Michael Zulli worked for Sim. Signatories Richard Pini and Larry Marder were self-publishers. Sim hosted a creators' summit in the spring of 1988 where he spoke out about the issue of publishing and creator's rights. Sim believed that if a consensus could be reached among creators at the summit, he could ethically justify bypassing Diamond and selling directly to readers of Cerebus.

=== The Northampton Summit ===
Through a series of meetings, in November 1988 a document was finalized at the "Northampton Summit" held in Northampton, Massachusetts, and signed by all in attendance. Scott McCloud was the principal author of the Bill; other artists and writers participating in the Bill's creation included Sim, Steve Bissette, Larry Marder, Rick Veitch, Peter Laird, and Kevin Eastman. An early draft of the Bill was published in the July 1989 issue of The Comics Journal, which had covered the issue thoroughly in its pages over the years. The Bill's final draft was published in the September 1990 issue of The Comics Journal.

According to Sim, the provision of the Bill that affirmed the creator's right to choose the means of distributing his or her work "was the answer that I had been looking for when the process got started. I had the right to choose to sell the High Society trade paperback direct to my own readers. Kevin and Peter promptly published a hardcover of the complete Turtles and sold it direct to their readers, helping to reinforce the point—we have the right to do this".

In the aftermath of the Summit, Diamond relented and continued to carry The Puma Blues. In the ensuing years, Sim continued to sell trade paperback collections of Cerebus, of which High Society was one of 16 eventual volumes, directly to readers via ads in Cerebus, Following Cerebus, and the trade paperback collections, until sometime during the publication of Following Cerebus prior to August 2005. Sim has now switched entirely to distribution of the trade paperbacks through the traditional retailers.

== Legacy ==
Many prominent comic book professionals, including some involved in its drafting, hold that the Creator's Bill of Rights had little or no impact on the industry.

In 2005, Dave Sim wrote that "clearly no one is saluting the Bill of Rights as it stands nor do I really expect them to". He added: "It seems obvious to me that Steve Bissette and I are the only two of the original participants who are interested in discussing it so I assume everyone else has decided that it was worthless and something to be ashamed of. I'm enough of an egoist that that pushes me in completely the other direction and I suspect the same is true of Steve". Sim wrote that in retrospect he should have been more patient with the retailers and allowed them to distribute High Society, rather than opt for a massive infusion of cash.

Steve Bissette reflected in 2005 that "the Creator Bill of Rights is still as valid and relevant as ever", but lamented that it had received a "paucity of attention or discussion since" its debut.

Scott McCloud, who authored the preliminary draft of the Bill, wrote that "[t]he Bill never generated much noise in the industry and I wouldn't want to exaggerate its influence, but it provides an interesting snapshot of our attitudes at the time, and of the climate that was fueling self-publishers, progressive business people, and artists trying to reinvent the comics industry". McCloud also said that "the Bill got very little play in the comics press...I don't think that many mainstream publishers gave the Bill much thought at all". McCloud did not believe that the Bill influenced the creation of Image Comics.

Erik Larsen, an artist, publisher and cofounder of Image Comics, denied that it had any impact on Image Comics or the industry in general, stating that "[t]he Creators' Bill of Rights was always a puzzle to me… Those who drafted and signed it, talk about the Creators' Bill of Rights as though it's a document of some historic import, I'll grant you, but outside of those who signed it—I've never had it brought up or even mentioned in passing to me by anybody in the industry". Larsen argued that the signatories did not speak for the wider industry and had no authority to do so. Larsen added: "I think its impact in the industry is, frankly, minimal at best. Heck, I've never read the darned thing".

According to Denis Kitchen, a cartoonist, publisher, author and agent, and the founder of Kitchen Sink Press and the Comic Book Legal Defense Fund, he and Will Eisner, creator of the Spirit and also a publisher, did not take the Creator's Bill of Rights very seriously. Kitchen and Eisner viewed the Bill as "sincere" and "idealistic", but "at the end of the day… pie-in-the-sky".

Rick Veitch, an artist and signatory to the Bill, said that he was "not sure what direct effect the Bill had on the industry. Things were already changing at the big publishers… Maybe the most direct effect was the formation of Tundra by Kevin Eastman. Tundra was originally set up along the Bill's guidelines and wasn't able to make it work". In 1990, signatory Eastman founded the creator-friendly Tundra Publishing to embody the ideals of the Bill from a publishers' standpoint. As part of the initial group who "got together to form the" Bill, Eastman felt obligated to expand it beyond theory and into practice, providing a creator-friendly forum for comics creators to work for a publisher while maintaining ownership of their work. Tundra folded in 1993 after losing $14 million.

== Text ==
For the survival and health of comics, we recognize that no single system of commerce and no single type of agreement between creator and publisher can or should be instituted. However, the rights and dignity of creators everywhere are equally vital. Our rights, as we perceive them to be and intend to preserve them, are:

1. The right to full ownership of what we fully create.
2. The right to full control over the creative execution of that which we fully own.
3. The right of approval over the reproduction and format of our creative property.
4. The right of approval over the methods by which our creative property is distributed.
5. The right to free movement of ourselves and our creative property to and from publishers.
6. The right to employ legal counsel in any and all business transactions.
7. The right to offer a proposal to more than one publisher at a time.
8. The right to prompt payment of a fair and equitable share of profits derived from all of our creative work.
9. The right to full and accurate accounting of any and all income and disbursements relative to our work.
10. The right to prompt and complete return of our artwork in its original condition.
11. The right to full control over the licensing of our creative property.
12. The right to promote and the right of approval over any and all promotion of ourselves and our creative property.

== Signatories ==
- Steve Bissette
- Gerhard
- Larry Marder
- Mark Martin
- Mirage Studios
  - Ryan Brown
  - Michael Dooney
  - Kevin Eastman
  - Craig Farley
  - Peter Laird
  - Steve Lavigne
  - Jim Lawson
  - Ken Mitchroney
  - Stephen Murphy
  - Eric Talbot
- Scott McCloud
- Richard Pini
- Dave Sim
- Rick Veitch
- Michael Zulli

== See also ==
- Creator ownership in comics
