= Peter Laird =

American comic book artist (born 1954)

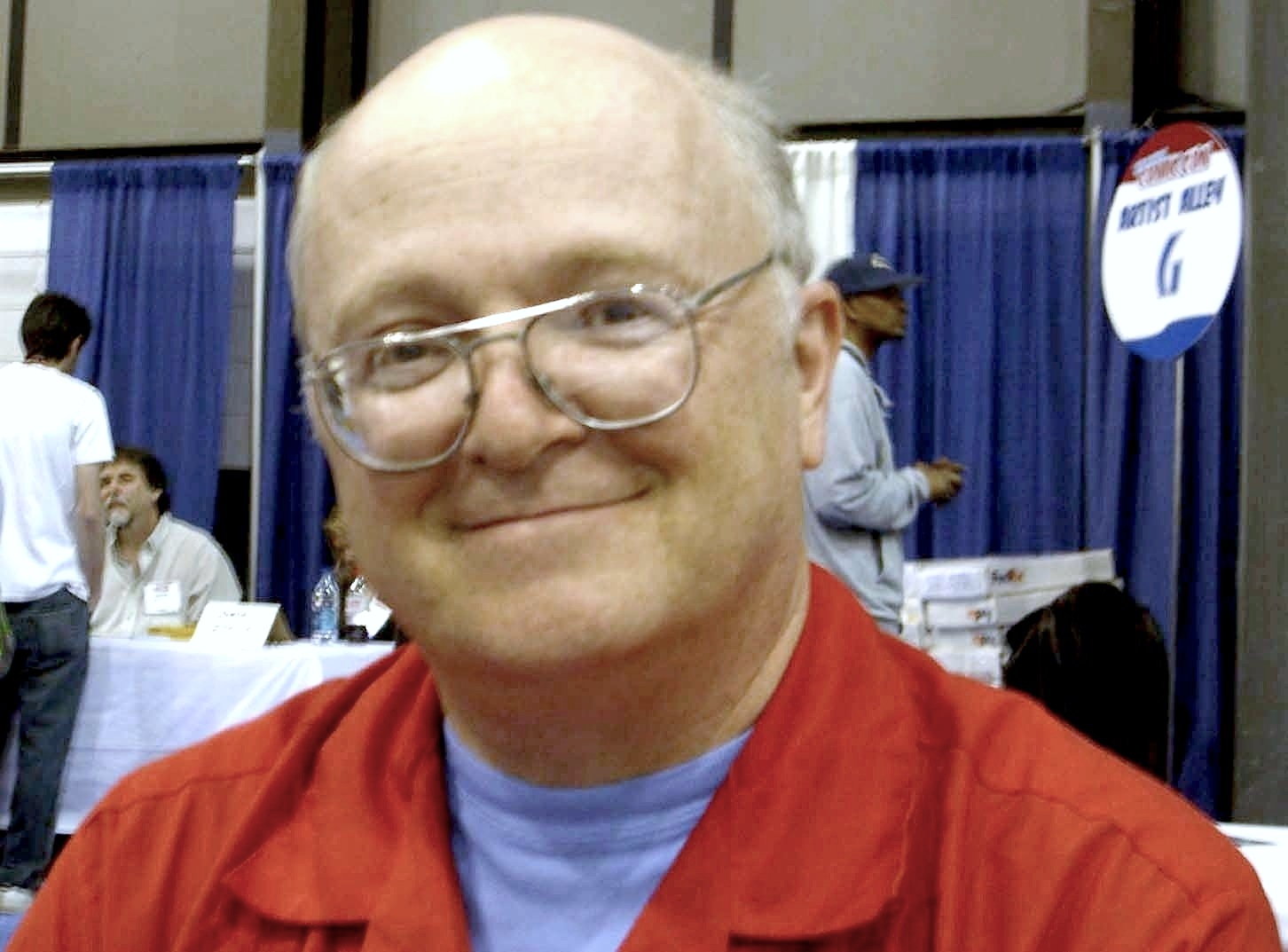
- Laird at the 2008 New York Comic Con
- Born: Peter Alan Laird; January 27, 1954 (age 72) North Adams, Massachusetts, U.S.
- Areas: Writer; artist; penciler; inker; colorist; letterer; editor
- Notable works: Teenage Mutant Ninja Turtles
- Collaborators: Kevin Eastman, Jim Lawson
- Awards: Inkpot Award (1989)

Peter Alan Laird (born January 27, 1954) is an American comic book writer and artist. He is best known for co-creating the Teenage Mutant Ninja Turtles with writer and artist Kevin Eastman.

== Early life and career ==
Laird was born on January 27, 1954, in North Adams, Massachusetts. Toward the end of 1983, Laird was earning just ten dollars an illustration from a local newspaper in Dover, New Hampshire. He was also doing illustrations for fanzines like The Oracle.

== Teenage Mutant Ninja Turtles ==
In May 1984, Laird and Kevin Eastman self-published the first black & white issue of Teenage Mutant Ninja Turtles, at an initial print run of 3000 copies for the forty-page oversized comic. It was largely funded by a loan from Eastman's uncle, Quentin (the experience of which had a profound impact on Laird, and led indirectly to his later work with the Xeric Foundation), and published by the duo's Mirage Studios, a name chosen because "there wasn’t an actual studio, only kitchen tables and couches with lap boards." That first issue received a number of subsequent printings over the next few years, as the Turtles phenomenon began to take off.

Laird's newspaper experience led to the duo creating "a four-page press kit", that, according to Flaming Carrot creator Bob Burden's own Mystery Men press-kit, included "a story outline and artwork that they sent to 180 TV and radio stations," as well as both the Associated Press and United Press International. This led to widespread press coverage of both the TMNT property and Mirage Studios itself, creating "a demand for the interestingly-titled comic that caught everyone by surprise." With the solicitation of their second issue, Eastman and Laird's Turtles comic began a meteoric rise to success, bringing in advance orders of 15,000 copies. This, Eastman has been quoted as saying, "basically ended up with us clearing a profit of two thousand dollars apiece. Which allowed us to write and draw stories full-time: it was enough to pay the rent, pay the bills, and buy enough macaroni and cheese and pencils to live on."

The Turtles phenomenon saw the duo invited to their first comics convention at the tenth annual Atlanta Fantasy Fair in 1984, where they mingled with the likes of Larry Niven, Forrest J Ackerman and Fred Hembeck (among others). With their (November 1985) fifth issue, Teenage Mutant Ninja Turtles downsized to the more common American comics format and size, and the previous four issues were also reprinted in this size and format with new color covers. Also in 1985, Solson Publications released How To Draw Eastman and Laird's Teenage Mutant Ninja Turtles. Solson would follow this up with the six issue Teenage Mutant Ninja Turtles Authorized Martial Arts Training Manual as well as one issue of Teenage Mutant Ninja Turtles Teach Karate volume in 1987.

=== Unexpected success ===
That the Teenage Mutant Ninja Turtles became such a success (and in such a short space of time) came as a surprise to both Eastman and Laird. Laird has stated on several occasions that:

…start[ing] the Turtles…was a goof; it was not anything we envisioned directing our lives in any way, shape, or form. It was like, ‘Hey, this looks like fun! Let's self-publish it! Let's see what happens!’...Suddenly, and just completely out of the blue, this Turtles phenomenon emerged. And really – from day one – just took over. It was a rapidly accelerating process which culminated in essentially taking over our lives. Completely.

This led to increased pressures on the two creators (and the team which they formed to help them), including a prolonged period (about a year) of artist's block in Laird. The "incredible growth and complexity of the business" that sprang up around their instantly-successful Turtles properties led to Laird's "suddenly discover[ing] to my horror that I no longer enjoyed drawing. It was a real shock, because if I ever had anything that I could rely on... it was that I loved to draw."

Laird and Eastman's creations went on to become a popular cultural phenomenon, forcing both of them to take regular sabbaticals from the comic to deal with the day to day pressures of running what had become a multimedia franchise. Eastman sold his share of the franchise, with the exception of a small continuing income participation, to Laird and the Mirage Group on June 1, 2000. On March 1, 2008, Laird and Mirage bought out Eastman's remaining rights and interest and the two went their separate ways. Concerning Eastman's departure, Laird stated his belief that Eastman "was just tired of it." On October 19, 2009, Laird sold the franchise to Viacom, the parent company of Nickelodeon, but still retains the rights to create and publish up to eighteen black-and-white comics based on the franchise per year.

== Animation ==
Although ostensibly over-seeing the animated Turtles projects through Mirage, Laird had minimal hands-on involvement in the development of the original animated series, and even less with the Next Mutation series. One of the unique products of this series, female turtle Venus, is notorious for becoming one of the additions to the franchise that Laird most despises. However, he took a more active role in the next TMNT animated venture, acting as "a consultant, and... working with the guy I consider the head writer, Lloyd Goldfine." In this role, he says "[f]rom the get-go I've been looking at everything, from day one. Story premises, outlines, the full scripts and the sketching and designing of characters and settings. I've been doing a little drawing myself. Lots of suggestions. I've seen a few of the episodes, and it's neat to see a lot of the stuff I've worked on." While final preparations were underway, he relaunched the official comics canon of the franchise with "Volume Four" (the third published by Mirage Studios), with artwork supplied by fellow TMNT writer, friend, and Rat King creator Jim Lawson. When the new series proved a success, Laird relaunched Tales of the TMNT to accompany the fourth volume.

Following a successful deal to revive the Turtles theatrically, Laird put Volume Four on hold to develop the new film, leaving several plot lines unresolved. Tales of the TMNT was thought to go on hiatus in 2008, and the franchise's future beyond its on-screen presence was uncertain, but staff confirmed that this was not the case. It was confirmed on Steve Murphy's blog that Peter Laird was intending to return to Volume 4 and that the title would return, distributed digitally by Mirage.

== Mirage Studios ==
With the success of the Teenage Mutant Ninja Turtles, Eastman and Laird hired a core group of artists to help with the increasing workload, beginning with Eastman's high school friend Steve Lavigne, brought on in 1984 as a letterer.

In 1985, Eastman and Laird hired Cleveland artist Ryan Brown to assist them as an inker, and a year later penciler Jim Lawson and cover painter Michael Dooney joined the studio. These six individuals would allow Mirage to expand into a number of spin-off and companion titles, starting with Tales of the Teenage Mutant Ninja Turtles, designed to fill in continuity gaps in the main title. Operating from a renovated factory space in Florence, Massachusetts, the Mirage team produced most of their work in-house, including the Playmates Toys toy designs and the Archie TMNT comic series, until Tundra Publishing took over the building.

Eastman and Laird along with Brown, Dooney, Lavigne and Lawson toured extensively over the years, making personal appearances and attending many comic book conventions. As the Turtles' popularity increased, further people were added to the studio, including Eric Talbot (who attended Eastman and Lavigne's old high school), writer Stephen Murphy, and Brown's friend, Dan Berger, who was brought in from Ohio to ink the Teenage Mutant Ninja Turtles Adventures title from Archie Comics. Aside from Eastman (whose creative differences and other pursuits saw him leave and sell his interest to Laird and Mirage), these individuals have remained with Mirage to the present. Stephen Murphy stepped down from his position as the managing editor in the middle of 2007 in favor of Dan Berger; Murphy remained as the creative director. In 1988, Mirage Studios participated in the drafting of the Creator's Bill of Rights for comic book creators.

== The Xeric Foundation ==
In addition to his other interests, Laird founded the Xeric Foundation, a nonprofit organization created after considerable thought, as "an appropriate way to give back something extra to the comics world," by providing grants for self-publishers. While Eastman founded Tundra Publishing to embody the ideals of the Creator's Bill of Rights from a publisher's standpoint, Laird's vision involved funding rather than actively publishing individuals' work. His reasoning for this decision was in part simply due to him having "far too much to do as it is with Mirage." He "preferred to do something where it was more of a transfer of capital," with "all the worries... on other people's shoulders." The foundation itself, he explains is: "actually two foundations in one. One half of it is for charitable organizations, and the other half is for creators who want to self-publish their comics." That later half is perhaps what the foundation is best known for, working much the same as any benevolent fund, involving an applicatory process detailing how much money is being applied for and why.

=== Origins ===
Laird's "experience with the Turtles and self-publishing" was a learning process that, he felt "would be very valuable to other people to go through" as well, "in teaching creators about themselves, about life [and] about the hard reality of business." He cites the summits he, Eastman, Scott McCloud, Dave Sim and others had (which led directly to the formalizing of the "Creator's Bill of Rights," setting out in writing the necessary working arrangements that comics creators felt ought to be met regarding ownership of their work and proper remuneration, etc.) in informing his decision to set up the foundation, but also notes that he received "many requests for money," necessitating the creation of the Xeric Foundation's charitable end simply to deal with such requests "in an organized fashion."

Indeed, when asked in an interview on the Project Fanboy website, Laird was quoted as saying:

The initial impetus for creating the Xeric Foundation was frustration – when the Turtle thing started getting really huge, people started coming out of the woodwork to ask for money. Many of them were legitimate charitable organizations or creators needing funding, but there were also quite a few ridiculous things – like the total stranger who asked me for a quarter of a million dollars to fund his general store. It got to the point where I was getting overwhelmed with making these kinds of decisions, and it was suggested to me that a foundation might be a good way to "separate the wheat from the chaff", providing official and clearly delineated channels through which people looking for money had to make their way.

Laird recalled that the publication of the first issue of his and Eastman's Teenage Mutant Ninja Turtles comic came about thanks to a loan the two secured from Quentin Eastman, Kevin Eastman's uncle. Although the two were able to pay him back swiftly, it led Laird to speculate about what could have been: "if we hadn't gotten that loan from him at that point in our lives, it might have taken us a couple more months to raise that money from other sources, and who knows what might have happened differently as a result of that delay?" It occurred to him that "there must be so many times where a self-publishing venture can sink or float on the strength of" a relatively small amount of money, so he felt a desire to use some of his "good fortune, in the financial sense, to help people out" (and, in addition to the creators, the foundation also aids those "involved in charitable organizations").

Moreover, he cites "[a] big difference" between his and Eastman's personal Turtles situation and the charitable foundation as being "that the Xeric grants are not loans, which have to be paid back, but actual grants, which do not." He "credit[s] Kendall Clark, who has run the foundation for me from the beginning, as one of the main reasons it has worked as well as it has... she's done a wonderful job."

=== Naming and process ===
The naming of the foundation "originated out of a Scrabble game with [Laird's] brother Don," "Xeric" simply being "a word [he] like[d]" ostensibly meaning dry and desertlike – but which ultimately "has absolutely no direct connection with the foundation."

The creative side of the foundation involves the usual application process, but in addition, the foundation began with "an advisory committee made up of three... people working in the industry" whose input is sought on how best to proceed with each application. Submissions are evaluated prior to Laird's involvement, and then he makes the ultimate decisions based on their recommendations. Laird stated in 1993 that: "...knock on wood, God willing, and the creek don't rise, if we go on for another couple of decades, and I'm able to put more money into the basic funding of the Xeric Foundation, then the amount of money that can be given out can really be raised significantly." He hoped that ultimately the figure can be raised from "thousands of dollars" to "hundreds of thousands of dollars," to support an increasing number of large and small projects.

== Other work ==
In a 1993 interview with Stephen Bissette and Stanley Wiater, interviewer-editors of Comic Book Rebels, Laird commented:

Laird: ...Ask me how many other comic books I've drawn?

CBR: Okay, how many other comic books have you drawn?

Laird: Zero!

CBR: All right, how many book covers and album jackets have you done?

Laird: Zero! Zero! It's all been Turtles!

Since that time, Laird has been able to find time to pursue some other comic book work, including publishing Stupid Heroes, and the graphic novel trilogy Planet Racers, with Jim Lawson. Even this ties into the TMNT, however, since the 2003 TMNT series has episodes based on the theme of Planet Racers.

In December 2019, issue #100 of IDW Publishing's Teenage Mutant Ninja Turtles comic series featured a teaser ad for an upcoming comic project titled The Last Ronin in which the prospect of a possible reunion and cooperation between Laird and Eastman was held out. In April 2020, it was revealed that while the plot was based on a story outline written by Peter Laird and Kevin Eastman in 1987, the book would be scripted by Eastmnan and Tom Waltz.
