= Tales of the Teenage Mutant Ninja Turtles =

US comic book series

- Tales of the Teenage Mutant Ninja Turtles #3. Cover art by Ryan Brown.

Publication information
- Publisher: Mirage Studios
- Format: Ongoing series
- Genre: Action-adventure, science fiction
- Publication date: 1987–2010
- No. of issues: 77
- Main character: Teenage Mutant Ninja Turtles

Creative team
- Created by: Kevin Eastman and Peter Laird

Tales of the Teenage Mutant Ninja Turtles (called Tales of the TMNT in its later Volume 2 incarnation) is an anthology comic book series that was published by Mirage Studios starting in May 1987. It acted as a companion book to the main Turtles comic series, presenting additional stories featuring the Turtles and their supporting cast and filling in the gaps in the continuity of the Mirage Turtles universe. It was published in two distinct volumes.

== Volume 1 (1987–1989) ==
The title's first run was from 1987 to 1989, released in alternating months with the regular Eastman and Laird book, with Ryan Brown and Jim Lawson handling the writing and artwork.

Although only seven issues of Volume 1 of Tales were published, it provided an opportunity to expand the TMNT character roster to include characters such as Nobody, Leatherhead, Rat King, Complete Carnage, and Radical – most of whom went on to feature in the main title. Tales is also notable for borrowing a unique tradition that originated in Creepy magazine: an opening splash page would feature an introduction by a TMNT character and conclude with the ominous line, "Let me tell you a story". This page also served as a showcase of sorts for a variety of guest artists. The title ceased publication in 1989 when the TMNT became a licensed property. Jim Lawson moved to Mirage's ongoing TMNT series while Ryan Brown shifted toward art and design work for TMNT licensees, including the Teenage Mutant Ninja Turtles Adventures title from Archie Comics.

== Volume 2 (2004–2010) ==
Sixteen years later, under the direction of Stephen Murphy, a relaunch of the series began publication in January 2004. The new Tales of the TMNT (as the covers read) focused on events that occur throughout the Turtles' lives, including some of the "lost" thirteen years occurring between TMNT Volumes 2 and 4. Issue #25 featured the return of the original Tales creative team of Brown and Lawson. This revived title maintained the tradition of including a "Let me tell you a story" splash page at the beginning of every issue, in homage to its 1980s predecessor. In May 2010, the second volume ended its run with a total of 70 issues, ten times as many as its predecessor.

== Collected books ==
The original series' entire run has been collected twice as trade paperbacks, first in 1989 and again in 2007. Each version of the trade features new story contents, with the 1989 collection featuring a new 10-page back-up story at the end written and drawn by Jim Lawson. The 2007 collection features a new 27-page story by Lawson entitled "Spinal Tapped" with this story taking place after issue #7 and a 4-page epilogue by Murphy and Lawson. The 2007 edition does not include the new back-up story from the 1989 collection. Additionally, the 2007 collection also features new opening splash pages, omitting the original opening splash pages completely.

Five volumes of Tales of the TMNT Volume 2 have been collected by Mirage Studios from 2006 to 2008, selecting random issues, or based on linked themes/characters.

IDW Publishing would later also collect issues of both volumes of Tales of the TMNT (reprinted in color) after acquiring the comic book licensing rights from new franchise owner Viacom.

Volume 1:

- The Collected Tales of the Teenage Mutant Ninja Turtles Volume 1 (Dec. 1989)
- Tales of the TMNT: Original Vol. 1 Series Treasury Edition (Nov. 2007, 256 Pages, ISBN 0-9787029-9-9, $18 US/ $20 Canada)

Volume 2:

- Tales of the TMNT: The Collected Books Vol. One – reprints Tales of the TMNT Volume II #1, 10, 16, 18 & 26 (Oct. 2006; 142 pages; ISBN 0-9787029-0-5; $12 US/ $13 Canada)
- Tales of the TMNT: The Collected Books Vol. Two – reprints Tales of the TMNT Volume II #5 and all four issues of "Tales of Leonardo: Blind Sight" (Jan. 2007; 142 pages; ISBN 0-9787029-1-3; $12 US/ $13 Canada)
- Tales of the TMNT: The Collected Books Vol. Three – reprints Tales of the TMNT Volume II #6, 20, 24, 27 and 28 (June, 2007; 154 pages; ISBN 0-9787029-5-6; $12 US/ $13 Canada)
- Tales of the TMNT: The Collected Books Vol. Four – reprints Tales of the TMNT Volume II #3, 4, 13, 14 and 33 (Sept. 2007: 128 pages; ISBN 0-9787029-6-4; $13 US/ $14 Canada)
- Tales of the TMNT: The Collected Books Vol. Five – reprints Tales of the TMNT Volume II #2, 9, 15, 17 and 25 (Feb. 2008; 148 pages; ISBN 0-9787029-2-1; $13 US/ $14 Canada)

Volume 1+2 IDW Imprint:

- Tales of the Teenage Mutant Ninja Turtles Vol. 1, Tales of the TMNT Volume I #1–4 + Extras (December 2012)
- Tales of the Teenage Mutant Ninja Turtles Vol. 2, Tales of the TMNT Volume I #5–7 (April 2013)
- Tales of the Teenage Mutant Ninja Turtles Vol. 3, Tales of the TMNT Volume II #1–4 (October 2013)
- Tales of the Teenage Mutant Ninja Turtles Vol. 4, Tales of the TMNT Volume II #5–8 (May 2014)
- Tales of the Teenage Mutant Ninja Turtles Vol. 5, Tales of the TMNT Volume II #9–12 (August 2014)
- Tales of the Teenage Mutant Ninja Turtles Vol. 6, Tales of the TMNT Volume II #13–16 (November 2014)
- Tales of the Teenage Mutant Ninja Turtles Vol. 7, Tales of the TMNT Volume II #17–20 (August 2015)
- Tales of the Teenage Mutant Ninja Turtles Vol. 8, Tales of the TMNT Volume II #22–25 (April 2016)
- Tales of the Teenage Mutant Ninja Turtles Vol. 9, Tales of the TMNT Volume II #26–30 (intended for January 2017; seemingly canceled)
- Tales of the Teenage Mutant Ninja Turtles Omnibus Vol. 1 - reprints Tales of the TMNT Volume I #1–7 & Tales of the TMNT Volume II #1–8 (May 2018)
