= Domino Chance =

Science fiction comic series

Domino Chance is a comic originally published from 1982 through 1986 by Chance Enterprises. It would be later released under the title Amazing Comics. Written and drawn by Kevin Lenagh, the series lasted ten issues. It was self-published by Kevin's wife Sandra Lenagh and was later re-issued.

It was a sci-fi story about The Scarab, a spaceship captained by a cockroach named Domino Chance. He and the crew would do various odd-jobs for money.

This comic introduced Gizmo Sprocket, who made several appearances. Chance Enterprises also published Gizmo's first full-length comic before it moved to Mirage Studios.

After almost 40 years Kevyn (having come out as her true self in 2020) Is finally tackling the next set of adventures of Domino Chance, Arnie Zoots and Troubles Galore, due out in summer of 2024.
