= Rat King (Teenage Mutant Ninja Turtles) =

Fictional character

- Rat King, as he appeared on the variant cover of Teenage Mutant Ninja Turtles Annual 2021 (June 2021 IDW). Art by Kevin Eastman.

Publication information
- Publisher: Mirage Studios; Archie Comics; IDW Publishing
- First appearance: Tales of the Teenage Mutant Ninja Turtles #4 (Feb. 1988)
- Created by: Jim Lawson

In-story information
- Team affiliations: The Pantheon
- Notable aliases: Monster, Ghost, The Rat, Ha'ntaan, The Slayer, The Ultimate Slayer, Dr. Victor Falco
- Abilities: Capable of communicating with and telepathically controlling rats Enhanced strength Enhanced speed and agility Cloaking; Inhuman healing factor

The Rat King is a fictional character in the Teenage Mutant Ninja Turtles multimedia franchise. The character was created by Jim Lawson and first appeared in the comic Tales of the Teenage Mutant Ninja Turtles #4. He has made various appearances since, in the comic books and other media, such as animated series and video games.

Born and raised in Boston and later migrated to New York, the Rat King remains one of the more enigmatic characters in Teenage Mutant Ninja Turtles, with various appearances depicting him as either a villain, a neutral character or even an ally to the titular team. The Rat King has apparent telepathic influence over rats.

== Appearances ==
=== Mirage Comics ===
In the Mirage Studios Teenage Mutant Ninja Turtles comics, the Rat King makes his first appearance in Tales of the Teenage Mutant Ninja Turtles #4 as the story's main antagonist. After residing in a swamp for several months, the Rat King ventures into a nearby abandoned industrial park and use it as shelter against the oncoming winter. There, the Rat King happens upon the Teenage Mutant Ninja Turtles and their friend Casey Jones, who had come to the industrial park to train. Believing the Turtles and Casey to be other "monsters" who wish to take his territory, the Rat King proceeds to stalk them throughout the park, even capturing Michelangelo and leaving him to be devoured by the rats (Michelangelo later escapes). The Rat King is eventually defeated by Leonardo who, in a duel with the Rat King, flings several shurikens at him, which knock him off balance, sending him plummeting into a silo.

The Rat King returns in the story arc "City at War", where his corpse communicates with Splinter.

=== Teenage Mutant Ninja Turtles (1987–1996) ===
The Rat King appears as a recurring character in the 1987 Teenage Mutant Ninja Turtles animated series, voiced by Townsend Coleman. This version has blonde or orange hair instead of black; his first few appearances on the show also had him controlling rats with a flute rather than with telepathy. The animated version of the Rat King was also depicted as highly intelligent, shown to be able to create chemical concoctions and bombs.

=== Archie Comics ===
In Archie Comics Teenage Mutant Ninja Turtles Adventures series, the Rat King is given the name Lord Ha'ntaan. The Rat King's first appearance in the Archie Comics continuity is in issue eleven, where the Turtles encounter him while searching for Shredder in the sewers. The Rat King allows the Turtles to pass him unhindered and tells them where Shredder is, after Leonardo proves that he and his brothers mean him and his rat subjects no harm.

The Rat King has an extended role in "The Future Shark Trilogy", which reveals him to be still active several decades in the future (showing no signs of having aged at all). After the future version of Donatello exterminated most of the world's rat population, the Rat King declares war on him and his allies for killing so many of his "children". Though mentioned throughout "The Future Shark Trilogy", the Rat King only appears in person in the story-arc's last issue, which has him engaging in a battle royal with the Turtles, their allies, and several other villains. The Rat King is defeated in the issue after Verminator X accidentally floods the room, washing the Rat King and his rats away.

=== Teenage Mutant Ninja Turtles (2003–2009) ===
The Rat King appears in Teenage Mutant Ninja Turtles (2003), voiced by David Zen Mansley. This version, also known as Slayer, is a prototype super soldier created by Agent Bishop using Splinter's DNA.

=== Teenage Mutant Ninja Turtles (2012–2017) ===
The Rat King appears in Teenage Mutant Ninja Turtles (2012), voiced by Jeffrey Combs. This version is Victor Falco, a scientist who created a neurochemical that allows him to read minds. In the second season, Falco obtains several containers of mutagen and begins experimenting on rats, intending to create an army of mutant rats akin to Splinter. Falco is thwarted by Splinter and thrown into the Undercity, killing him. In the fourth season episode "Darkest Plight", Splinter has a fever and hallucinates that the Rat King has returned.

=== IDW Publishing ===
In the IDW comic book series, the Rat King is a member of the Pantheon, a group of demigods who once influenced humanity's evolution as a sort of competition among themselves. Scheming to become the ultimate winner in the game, the Rat King pits the Turtles and their enemies against each other until his brother Chi-You brings the conflict to an explosive conclusion which temporarily takes out the whole Pantheon.

== Video games ==
- The Rat King appears as a boss in the Super NES version of Teenage Mutant Ninja Turtles: Turtles in Time.
- The Rat King appears as a boss and unlockable playable character in the Super NES version of Teenage Mutant Ninja Turtles: Tournament Fighters.
- The 2003 animated series incarnation of the Rat King appears as a boss in Teenage Mutant Ninja Turtles 3: Mutant Nightmare.
- The Rat King appears in Teenage Mutant Ninja Turtles (2014), voiced by Jason Spisak.
- The Rat King appears as a boss in Teenage Mutant Ninja Turtles: Shredder's Revenge, voiced again by Townsend Coleman.
