= If the Good Lord's Willing and the Creek Don't Rise =

1955 American country song

"If The Good Lord's Willing and the Creek Don't Rise" is a 1955 American country song by Jerry Reed which was particularly popularized by the 1958 recording of Johnny Cash and has been covered by multiple artists.

== Lyrics ==
The lyrics play on the expression Lord willing and the creek don't rise, which is thought to originate from Alabama. The catchphrase itself was associated with Hank Williams. Marty Stuart places the words "If the Good Lord's willin' and the creek don't rise, we'll see you in the mornin'." in Williams' mouth in his tribute album Hillbilly Heaven. In the Reed song and Cash cover the verses vary the rhyme, so the opening line commences:

If the good Lord's willing and the creek stays down I'll be in your arms time the moon come around.

But in following verses the rhyme changes through "creeks don't rise", "creek stay low", back to "creeks don't rise".

The expression is incorrectly attributed on modern social media to an Indian agent, Benjamin Hawkins, in the late 18th century in a rumored letter not found in any archive to the U.S. President. In response to a request that he return to Washington D.C., he wrote, "God willing and the Creek don't rise." However, the first President to move to Washington was John Adams on 1 November 1800. The capitalization of the word Creek supposedly referred to the Creek behind his house rather than a tribe of indians.

== Versions ==
By date order (spelling and titling may vary):

- "If The Lord's Willing And The Creeks Don't Rise", song by Jerry Reed arranged Reed Capitol 1955
- "If The Good Lord's Willing", Johnny Cash, arranged Jerry Reed 1958
- "If The Good Lord's Willing And The Creek Don't Rise", Lattie Moore, Jerry Reed 1961
- "If The Good Lord's Willing", Ray Godfrey, arranged Jerry Reed, Tollie Records 1964
- "If The Good Lord's Willing", Willie Knight Heartland 2004

== Unrelated songs ==
- "(Be The Good Lord Willing) The Creek Don't Rise", Jivin' Gene, arranged Smith, Hall-Way Records 1964
- "If The Creek Don't Rise", Liz Anderson, arranged Liz Anderson, RCA Victor 1969
- "If The Good Lord's Willin'", Johnny Janis, N. Gimbel, A. Hoffman, B. Hart 1960
- "God Willin' & the Creek Don't Rise", with the lyric "God willin' an the creek don't rise, I'll be home again before this time next year." on God Willin' & the Creek Don't Rise 2010
- "Good Lord Willing", Jesse Frasure a.k.a. DJ Telemitry
- "Creek Don't Rise", William Clark Green, on Ringling Road
- "Up the Creek", Tori Amos, from album "Native Invader", 2017
- "Blue Diamonds", The Long Winters, from the album "When I Pretend to Fall", 2003. Includes the lyric "God willing and the creek don't rise, I've got two thousand dollars and a bullseye between my eyes."
- "Adios Maria", The Cactus Blossoms, from the album "You're Dreaming" on Walkie Talkie Records, 2015. Includes the lyric "I'll meet you in paradise/If the Good Lord is willing, and the creek don't rise".
