= The creek don't rise =

American slang expression

The expression "...the creek don't rise" is an American slang expression implying strong intentions subject to complete frustration by uncommon but not unforeseeable events. It presumably evokes occasional and unpredictably extreme rainfall in Appalachia that has historically isolated rural neighborhoods and interrupted travel.

The earliest documented appearance in print is the 1851 use of the phrase "Providence permittin’, and the creek don’t rise" by an uneducated but highly expressive female character in a short story in Graham's Magazine.

The expression experienced a rise in popularity in the second half of the twentieth century due to use by Tennessee Ernie Ford as the sign-off for his television shows.

More recently it has been claimed that the word "Creek" refers not to a geological feature but rather to the Creek Indians. However, this is unlikely.

Classic versions of its use tend to be along the lines of "The good Lord willing, and the creek doesn't rise"—i.e. "If God so wills, and as long as intense rain does not wash away bridges or parts of dirt roads, or cover roads too deeply for safely following them." It may take the form of regional dialect, in variations like "... Lor' willin' an' th' crick don' rise."

== See also ==
- Spike Lee's documentary series If God Is Willing and Da Creek Don't Rise
- Jerry Reed's song "If the Good Lord's Willing and the Creek Don't Rise", covered by Johnny Cash
- Ray LaMontagne's album God Willin' & the Creek Don't Rise
- "Good Lord's Willin and The Creek Don't Rise", covered by Hank Williams Sr
- Native Invader by Tori Amos
- Inshallah, a similar phrase in Arabic
