= Mirage Studios =

American comic book company, 1983–2021

- Industry: Comics
- Founded: 1983; 43 years ago, in Dover, New Hampshire
- Founder: Kevin Eastman; Peter Laird
- Defunct: September 9, 2021; 5 years ago
- Fate: Dormancy
- Headquarters: Dover, New Hampshire (1983–1984); Sharon, Connecticut (1984–1986); Northampton, Massachusetts, United States
- Products: Teenage Mutant Ninja Turtles
- Divisions: Mirage Licensing, Inc. Mirage Publishing, Inc. Mirage Management, Inc.

Mirage Studios was an American comic book company founded in 1983 by Kevin Eastman and Peter Laird in Dover, New Hampshire. The company was best known for the Teenage Mutant Ninja Turtles (TMNT) comic book series and the subsequent franchise it has spawned.

== History ==
Mirage Studios was started in 1983, in Dover, New Hampshire. The company was named "Mirage" because there was no actual company. Less than a year before Teenage Mutant Ninja Turtles #1 was published in May 1984, Eastman and Laird began experimenting with numerous series. Mirage then moved to Sharon, Connecticut, and stayed there for two years before ending up in Northampton, Massachusetts.

With the success of the Teenage Mutant Ninja Turtles, Eastman and Laird hired a core group of artists to help with the increasing workload. The first addition to the studio roster was Eastman's high school friend Steve Lavigne, brought on in 1984 as a letterer.

In 1985, Eastman and Laird hired artist Ryan Brown to assist them as an inker for the Turtles. Brown would be the first in a long line of artists, other than Eastman and Laird, that would work on the Teenage Mutant Ninja Turtles series. In the following year, two new members were added, penciler Jim Lawson from Connecticut and New Jersey's Michael Dooney who would paint a number of covers. With the addition of these four core artists along with Peter and Kevin, Mirage's Ninja Turtles output would expand over the next couple of years to include numerous Mirage spin-off titles, as well as a companion comic book entitled Tales of the Teenage Mutant Ninja Turtles. In 1989, Kevin Eastman invited freelance illustrator A.C. Farley to do cover paintings for the TMNT collected books. Peter Laird also invited Farley to do issue #29 of the TMNT comic. Farley was eventually invited to be part of the studio and crafted many paintings and comic artwork for the TMNT until his departure from the studio to resume his freelance business in 2004.

In 1991, Mirage secured an interlocutory injunction against Counter-Feat Clothing for similar designs of drawings.

The Mirage artists operated out of a renovated factory space in Florence, Massachusetts. This is where the bulk of the creative output was done, such as the Playmates Toys toy designs and the Archie TMNT comic series, until Tundra Publishing took over the building.

Eastman and Laird along with Brown, Dooney, Lavigne, Lawson and Farley toured extensively over the years, making personal appearances and attending many comic book conventions in Detroit, Chicago, Hawaii, San Diego, Ohio, Boston, and Portsmouth, New Hampshire among many others. As the TMNT went mainstream, later additions to the studio would include Eric Talbot from Eastman's and Lavigne's old high school, writer Stephen Murphy, and Brown's friend, Dan Berger, who was brought in from Ohio to ink the Teenage Mutant Ninja Turtles Adventure title from Archie Comics. In 1988, Mirage participated in the drafting of the Creator's Bill of Rights for comic book creators.

On October 21, 2009, it was announced that Viacom had purchased most of Mirage's rights to the Teenage Mutant Ninja Turtles property. Mirage retained the rights to publish 18 issues a year, though the future involvement of Mirage with the Turtles, and the future of Mirage itself, was unclear at the time of the announcement. Mirage went dormant on December 31, 2009. Already completed projects released into 2010, with the rest being canceled. The final project released by the studio was TMNT volume 4, issue 32, released in May 2014.

Since August 2011, IDW has held publishing rights to TMNT comics under license from Viacom.

On September 9, 2021, the company's website announced that its divisions had been completely dissolved, and all e-commerce sales would wind up on September 19, 2021. The website has remained active in archive form to document the comics published before IDW took over its rights, and is no longer actively updated.

== Staff ==
Here is the list of writers and artists who were part of Mirage Studios. List in alphabetical order:

- Dan Berger
- Jake Black
- Ryan Brown
- Michael Dooney
- Kevin Eastman
- A.C. Farley
- Tristan Huw Jones
- Mary Kelleher
- Peter Laird
- Steve Lavigne
- Jim Lawson
- Ross May
- Stephen Murphy
- Stan Sakai
- Eric Talbot

== Titles ==
Mirage produced many titles, although most did not remain in publication for more than a few issues. Comics published include:

- Bade Biker & Orson by Jim Lawson
- Barabbas by Dan Vado and Gino Atanasio
- Bioneers by A.C. Farley
- Commandosaurs by Peter Laird
- Dino Island by Jim Lawson
- Fugitoid by Kevin Eastman and Peter Laird
- Gizmo by Michael Dooney
- Gobbledygook by various artists
- Grunts by various artists
- Gutwallow by Dan Berger
- Hallowieners: Invasion of the Halloween Hot Dogs by Ryan Brown
- Hero Sandwich
- Melting Pot by Kevin Eastman and Eric Talbot
- Mirage Mini-Comics
- Paleo by Jim Lawson
- Planet Racers by Peter Laird and Jim Lawson
- Plastron Cafe by various artists
- Prime Slime Tails
- Justice Force
- The Puma Blues by Stephen Murphy and Michael Zulli
- Rockola by Ryan Brown
- Stupid Heroes by Peter Laird
- Teenage Mutant Ninja Turtles and related titles by Kevin Eastman and Peter Laird
- Usagi Yojimbo (volume 2) and related titles by Stan Sakai
- Xenotech by Michael Dooney
