= Kevin Eastman =

American comic book artist and writer

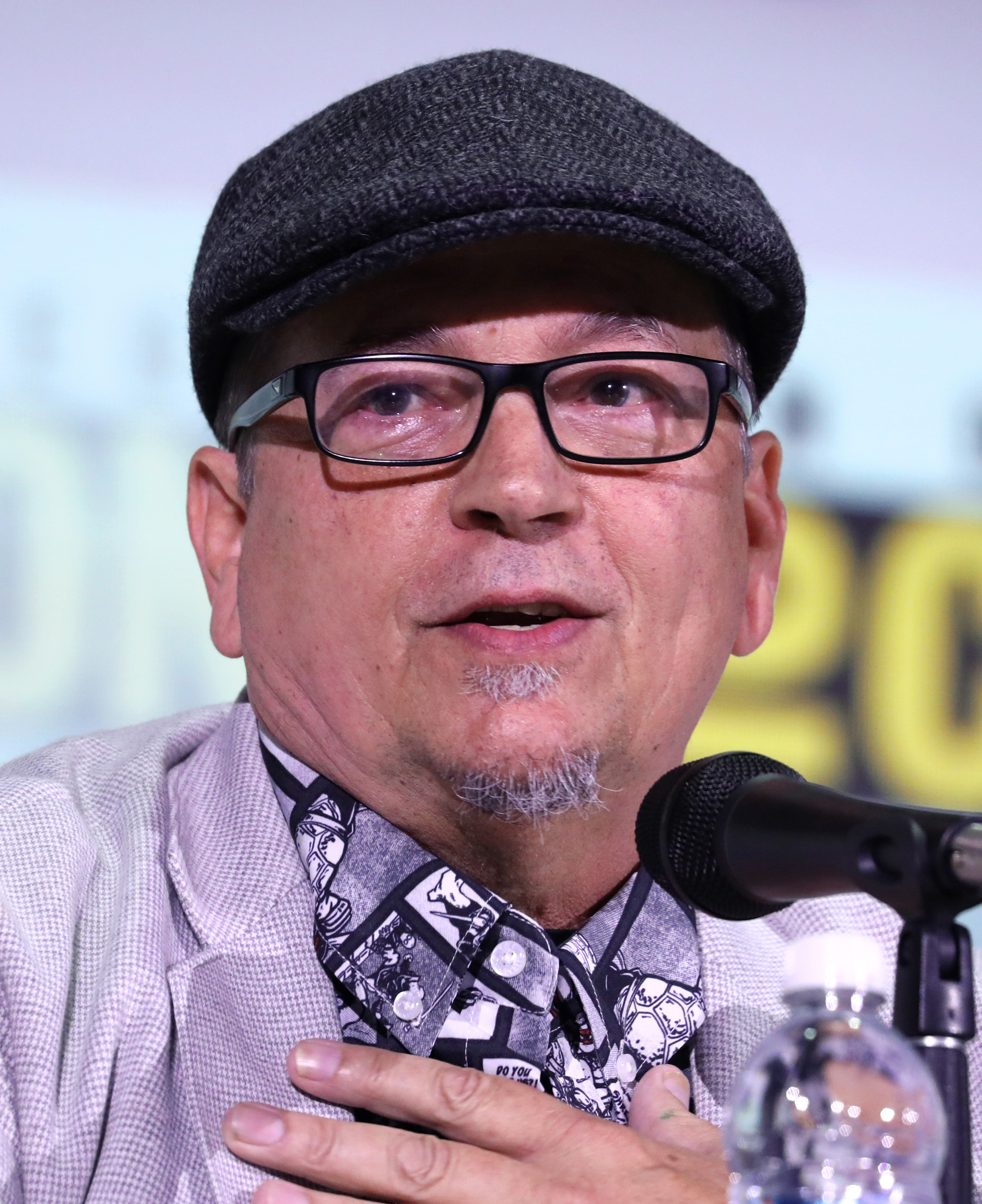
- Eastman in 2023
- Born: Kevin Brooks Eastman; May 30, 1962 (age 64) Portland, Maine, U.S.
- Areas: Comic book artist; writer; penciller; inker; editor; publisher; letterer; colorist
- Notable works: Teenage Mutant Ninja Turtles, Heavy Metal, The Melting Pot
- Collaborators: Peter Laird, Eric Talbot, Simon Bisley
- Awards: Inkpot Award (1989)
- Spouses: Julie Strain (m. 1995; div. 2006) Courtney Carr (m. 2013)
- Children: 2

Signature
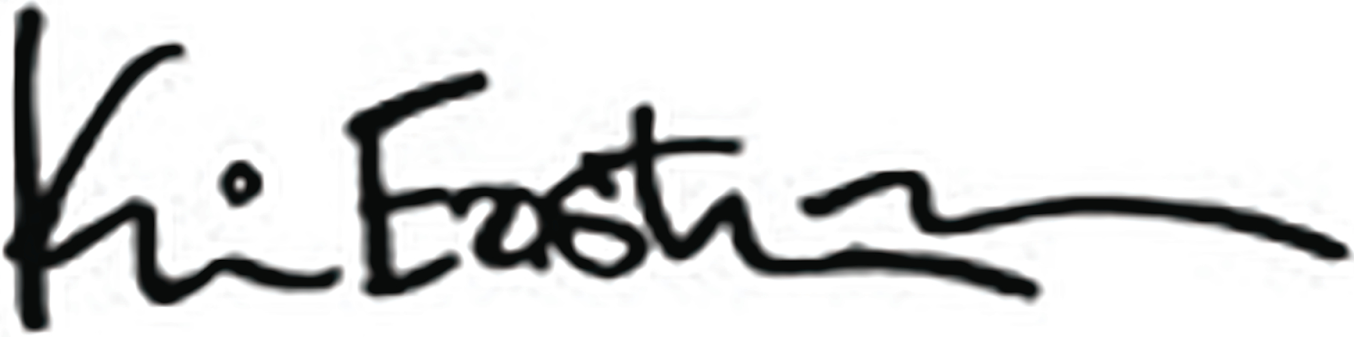

Kevin Brooks Eastman (born May 30, 1962) is an American comic book writer and artist best known for co-creating the Teenage Mutant Ninja Turtles with Peter Laird. Eastman was also formerly the editor and publisher of the magazine Heavy Metal.

== Early life and career ==
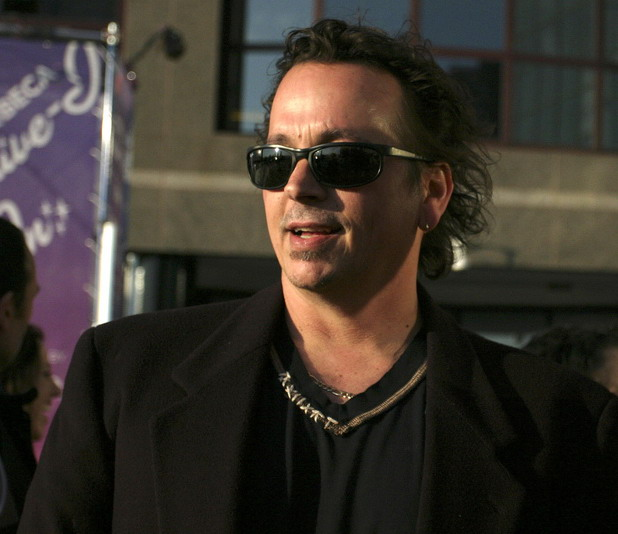
Eastman in 2009

Eastman was born in Portland, Maine. He attended Westbrook High School in Westbrook, Maine, with comic book illustrator Steve Lavigne. He grew up a comic book fan, with Jack Kirby as his idol and Kamandi as his favorite title of his.

In 1983, he worked in a restaurant while he searched for publishers for his comics. He met a waitress who was attending the University of Massachusetts Amherst and followed her to Northampton, Massachusetts. While searching for a local underground newspaper to publish his work, he began a professional relationship with Peter Laird, who worked in nearby Dover, New Hampshire, and the two collaborated for a short time on various comics projects.

In May 1984, Eastman and Laird self-published the first black & white issue of Teenage Mutant Ninja Turtles. The forty-page oversized comic had an initial print run of 3,275 copies and was largely funded by a $1,000 loan from Eastman's uncle Quentin. It was published by the duo's Mirage Studios, a name chosen because, as Eastman says, "there wasn't an actual studio, only kitchen tables and couches with lap boards." By September 1985, their first issue had received three additional printings.

== Teenage Mutant Ninja Turtles ==
Laird's newspaper experience led to the two creating a four-page press kit, which included a story outline and artwork. They sent the press kit to 180 television and radio stations as well as to the Associated Press and United Press International. This led to widespread press coverage of both the Teenage Mutant Ninja Turtles and Mirage Studios itself, creating a demand for the comic. With their second issue, Eastman and Laird's Turtles comic began a quick rise to success, bringing in advance orders of 15,000 copies, five times the initial print run of the first issue. This earned Eastman and Laird a profit of $2,000 each and allowed them to become full-time comic book creators.

The Turtles phenomenon saw the duo invited to their first comics convention at the tenth annual Atlanta Fantasy Fair in 1984, where they mingled with notable fandom celebrities like Larry Niven, Forrest J Ackerman and Fred Hembeck.

Their fifth issue of Teenage Mutant Ninja Turtles was released in November 1985, and was downsized to the more common American comics-format and size. The previous four issues were also reprinted in this size and format with new colored covers. Also in 1985, Solson Publications released How to Draw Eastman and Laird's Teenage Mutant Ninja Turtles. Solson would follow this up with the six-issue Teenage Mutant Ninja Turtles Authorized Martial Arts Training Manual as well as one issue of Teenage Mutant Ninja Turtles Teach Karate volume in 1987.

=== Licensing ===
Mirage's Turtles comic led to a widening media presence for the heroes. Eastman and Laird began to widely merchandise their property. Dark Horse Miniatures produced a set of 15 lead figurines for role-playing gamers and collectors, Palladium Books produced a role-playing game featuring the Turtles, and First Comics reprinted in four volumes the first eleven issues as color trade paperback collections.

Palladium's role-playing game brought the Turtles to the attention of licensing agent Mark Freedman and the Turtles phenomenon took off, with the various characters soon appearing on T-shirts, Halloween masks, mugs, and other paraphernalia. A five-part televised cartoon mini-series based on the Turtles debuted in December 1987. The half-hour episodes were produced by Osamu Yoshioka (吉岡 修) and the animation was directed by Yoshikatsu Kasai (笠井 由勝) from scripts by David Wise and Patti Howeth. The mini-series was successful, leading to a full series, with the mini-series forming the first season. The series had a 9-year, 10-season, 193-episode run. Bob Burden writes:

within days of it airing it was apparent that the TMNT would prove every bit as popular for the television audience as it had been for the comic readers. From there, Surge Licensing formed an unstoppable creative marketing powerhouse that set a new standard of excellence in the licensing and merchandising industries.

In January 1988, Eastman and Laird visited Playmates Toys, who wished to market action figures based on the comic book and animated cartoon series, further cementing the Turtles' place in history and making Eastman and Laird extremely successful.

=== Multimedia ===
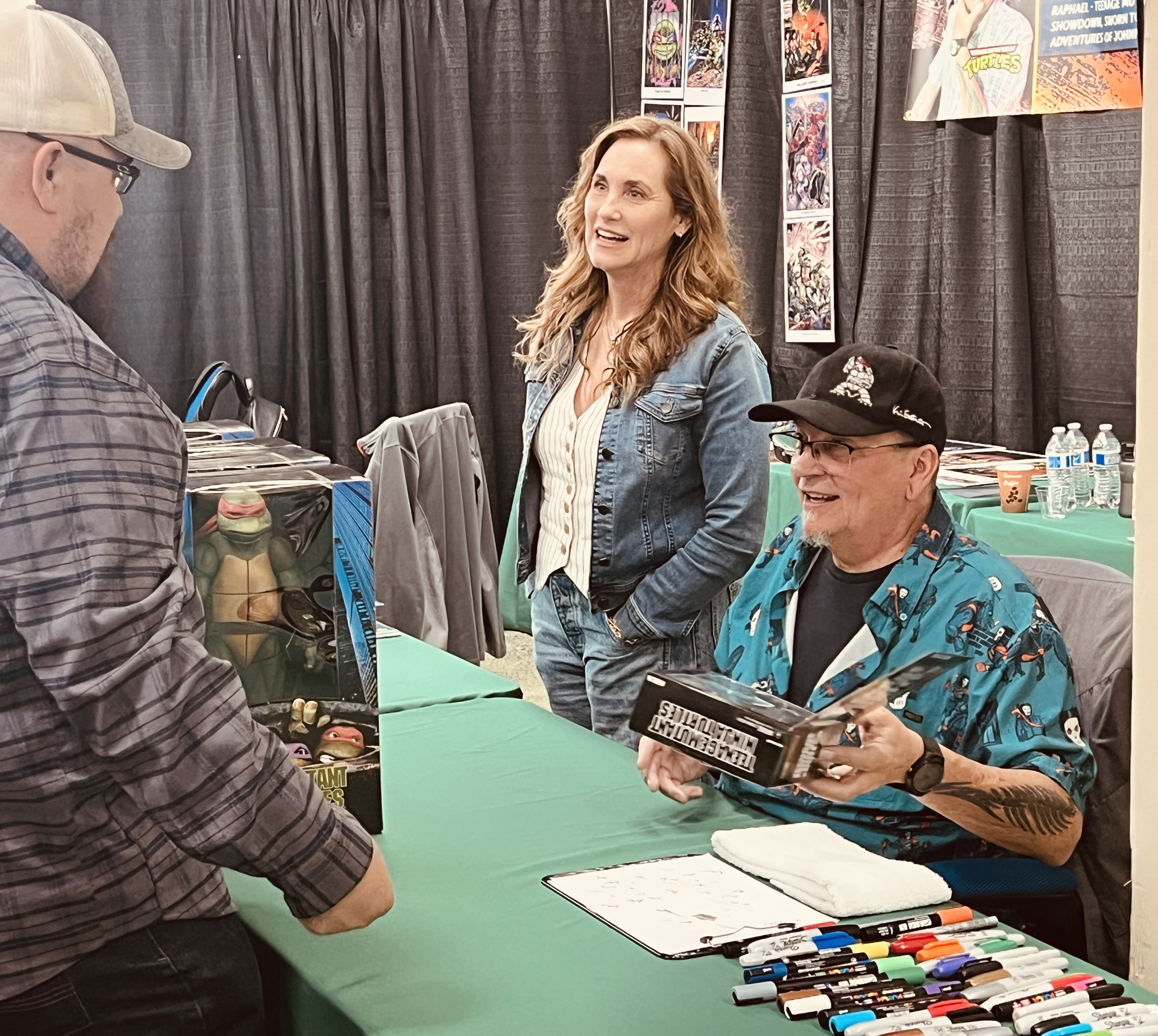
Eastman signing merchandise for a fan, with Judith Hoag standing next to him, in 2025

Multiple other Turtles comics, toys, books, games, and other merchandising items have subsequently appeared, overseen and sometimes fully created by Eastman and Laird. Among these are five live-action films: Teenage Mutant Ninja Turtles (1990), Teenage Mutant Ninja Turtles II: The Secret of the Ooze (1991), Teenage Mutant Ninja Turtles III (1993), Teenage Mutant Ninja Turtles (2014), and Teenage Mutant Ninja Turtles: Out of the Shadows (2016). Four more television series were also created: Ninja Turtles: The Next Mutation (1997), Teenage Mutant Ninja Turtles (2003), Teenage Mutant Ninja Turtles (2012), and Rise of the Teenage Mutant Ninja Turtles (2018). There also were two animated feature films: TMNT (2007) and Teenage Mutant Ninja Turtles: Mutant Mayhem (2023).

Eastman wrote the 2012 Teenage Mutant Ninja Turtles episode "Lone Rat and Cubs". He also co-wrote the 2016 stand-alone TMNT short "Pizza Friday". Eastman also made a brief cameo in Out of the Shadows, and made a voice-over cameo in Mutant Mayhem.

=== Eastman and Laird parting ways ===
Creative differences began to strain Eastman and Laird's partnership. In an interview in 2002, Laird noted that the two hadn't spent much time together since 1993. Eastman moved to California while Laird stayed in Massachusetts.

On June 1, 2000, Laird and the Mirage Group purchased Eastman's ownership in the Teenage Mutant Ninja Turtles property and corporations. Eastman wanted to move on to other projects. The buyout was completed on March 1, 2008.

In 2011, Eastman began working with the TMNT series again as a writer and artist on the IDW comic series, as well as an adviser on the 2014 reboot of the Teenage Mutant Ninja Turtles film series. Eastman is said to have a cameo in the film as a doctor, and has voiced the character Ice Cream Kitty in the 2012 CGI series.

In December 2019, issue #100 of IDW Publishing's Teenage Mutant Ninja Turtles comic series featured a teaser ad for an upcoming comic project titled The Last Ronin in which the prospect of a possible reunion and cooperation between Eastman and Laird was held out. The project was confirmed in April 2020, with a TBD release date sometime in the summer, and was subsequently released in October 2020.

== Tundra ==
=== Foundation ===
While co-managing Mirage Studios, Eastman and Laird often spoke of the difficulties in maintaining creative control of their work. Eastman decided to address this problem by using his own personal knowledge and connections to help other creators. Approaching Laird with his ideas, Eastman was met with a less than positive response:

[M]y first thought was to expand the publishing arm of Mirage. But the more sane of the two partners said, "What are you, nuts?" ...[w]e were working pretty much full time just on the Turtles. Pete told me, and I agreed, that he didn't want to have anything else on his brain in terms of publishing at the time. So with his blessing, I started Tundra Publishing.

=== Intentions and output ===
Eastman founded Tundra Publishing in 1990, to realize personal and other projects. He joined with other comic creators like Scott McCloud and Dave Sim to form the Creator's Bill of Rights. Eastman felt obligated to expand it beyond theory and into practice, providing a forum for comics creators to work for a publisher while maintaining ownership of their work.

Rick Veitch has written that:

One of the plans was for Tundra to act as an exoskeleton for an existing self-publisher; offering marketing muscle, higher production values, printing costs paid and a page rate up front for half the action no strings attached.

Moreover, Eastman provided a forum for Marvel and DC creators to work on projects that they could not otherwise realize:

Basically, I'd meet them at conventions and they'd said they're stuck doing Spider-Man, they had a wife and a kid at home, and they had to make ends meet. But if they really had a chance, they said they'd really do this [at Tundra] and I'd hear this repeatedly. So, I went back to those artists because I had the money and said I'd give them the chance. I asked them what they'd like to do. They could pick their dream projects that they'd wanna do and I would provide the funding so that they could survive and they didn't have to do Spider-Man for a year and I'll fund the projects and I just wanted to make my money back from the profits to keep my company going.

Projects (partly) realized by Tundra included: Alan Moore and Bill Sienkiewicz's Big Numbers, Moore and Eddie Campbell's From Hell, Moore and Melinda Gebbie's Lost Girls (these last two original serialized in Stephen R. Bissette's Taboo anthology, which was also part-published by Tundra), (Note: From Hell would continue to be published by Kitchen Sink Press after Tundra's demise, and both From Hell and Lost Girls were later published by Top Shelf Comix.) The Crow, Mike Allred's Madman and Dave McKean's Cages, and others.

Eastman initially thought that his experience at Mirage gave him "a pretty good grasp of what a publisher should be, and what a publisher needs to do," although he swiftly realized that "Tundra was not like publishing the Turtles."

=== Difficulties ===
As part of Eastman's designs for Tundra were to produce personal projects of a more adult nature than the Turtles-oriented Mirage was geared towards, (Note: Eastman notes that the initial black-and-white comic was considerably more 'adult' than what followed.) this saw Tundra fitting in the dubious middle-ground, as their intended product sat somewhat awkwardly between the comic shop and the book shop. Eastman says that he "thought that the audience was a lot larger than it actually was," citing his personal assumption that readers would "grow up through X-Men and discover The Sandman and then Dark Knight and Watchmen and beyond." The relatively new inroads of comics and graphic novels into bookshops worked against Tundra at the time.

Eastman swiftly became aware that Tundra and the Turtles differed considerably, not least since the latter was successful enough to effectively run itself, with a few 'nudges' "to keep it moving along." Tundra, on the other hand, dealt in new properties, which required "building from the ground up," and was "a lot more work" than Eastman had anticipated, growing far too quickly for comfort, and requiring considerable injections of time and money, rather than being profitable.

Speaking in 1992/93, Eastman was optimistic that the company had "finally reached the point where [it had] slowed up enough... to be giving individual projects the time and attention they require[d]."

=== Merger with Kitchen Sink Press and closure ===
Shortly thereafter, however, Tundra merged with Kitchen Sink Press (KSP), closing its (solo) doors after just three years. (Note: With the merger, Kitchen Sink Press moved operations from Wisconsin to Tundra's headquarters in Northampton, Massachusetts.) Although Eastman ended up on KSP's board, Kitchen Sink Press itself closed down in 1999, with Eastman losing between $9 and $14 million once the dust settled.

=== Aftermath ===
Despite heavy financial losses, Eastman remained philosophical about his work with Tundra. In a 2007 interview, he drew the analogy that:

Doing the Turtles was like going to college and doing Tundra Publishing was like getting my master's degree. So I learned a lot with the Turtles and I learned the rest of what I needed to know... when I did Tundra.

He made mention of the multiple award nominations Tundra received during its first and second years, including Harvey Awards and Eisner Awards, but noted that despite critical acclaim, the company was not making money on its titles, and had to cease production. He noted that Tundra was one of the earlier creator-owned companies, "before Image really took off" and before Dark Horse Comics' "Legends line."

Eastman admitted that Tundra tried to do too much too quickly, and ran into difficulties accordingly. He also suggested that "[n]ot one book made any money". He also believed that part of Tundra's downfall was tied to his offering Marvel and DC employees the chance to work on creator-owned and personal projects. He has stated in an interview that:

In my personal opinion, we took away so many creams of the crops [sic] artists like Dave McKean, Neil Gaiman, Alan Moore, Rick Veitch, Mike Allred... [that] the two big companies had the power to go to the key distributors and made them short sell, under ship and ____ing bury these guys because now that Dave McKean is doing stuff at Tundra, the big publishers were losing money because Dave's not doing Arkham Asylum 2 and Alan Moore's not doing Watchmen 2, he's not doing Swamp Thing, but instead he's doing From Hell with Tundra.... Basically, we got the raw end of the deal.

== Heavy Metal ==
Kevin Eastman had been a longtime fan of the science fiction and fantasy magazine, much of whose content was translated from the French, and appeared in the original Métal Hurlant publication of which Heavy Metal is only the American-licensed incarnation. He cites the publication as bringing Richard Corben to his attention as the "second greatest influence" on him as an artist, after Jack Kirby. He saw in its pages European art which had not been previously seen in the United States, as well as an underground comix sensibility that nonetheless "wasn't as harsh or extreme as some of the underground comix – but... definitely intended for an older readership."

Discovering Heavy Metal had been put up for sale, and with one of Tundra's stated aims, to bring a more adult sensibility (and mature, adult readers) to comics, overlapping with the magazine's target audience, Eastman decided that Heavy Metal was "the final piece of the puzzle", and looked into purchasing it. Noting that:

In my life, too many things have happened in a weird, sort of shit-luck sort of fashion,

Eastman purchased the magazine in January 1992.

Despite the audiences for Heavy Metal and Tundra's intended product (as well as more mature-themed comics in general) being of a broadly similar demographic, Eastman recognized from the start that "most of the audience who read Heavy Metal buy it off the newsstands; they're not going into comic book stores," and stated early on that his intention was to produce "numerous crossovers from the cutting edge of comics creators" to expose the magazine's readership not just to the comics industry, "but anything from the visual media that can cross over."

Eastman also attempted to bring some European hardcover comics to America, using Heavy Metal to help serialize them and both defray the costs and boost readership. Initial interest, however, was "fairly cool."

Eastman sold the magazine to digital and music veteran David Boxenbaum and film producer Jeff Krelitz in January 2014. Eastman continued to serve as publisher of the magazine until 2020, and was a minority investor in the new Heavy Metal.

== Other work ==
Aside from his work on multiple Teenage Mutant Ninja Turtles projects, and as publisher of Tundra Publishing, Eastman created Fistful of Blood, a black and white graphic novel featuring a blend of influences from Spaghetti Western and horror. The book featured art by Simon Bisley and was published by Heavy Metal.

Eastman has acted in a small number of films, including Guns of El Chupacabra in 1997 and The Rock n' Roll Cops in 2003. He also had a supporting role in the 2004 Troma film Tales from the Crapper. Before that, he had a cameo in the 2000 sequel to The Toxic Avenger called Citizen Toxie: The Toxic Avenger IV and had a small role in the first TMNT movie as a garbage collector. He also wrote one episode of the animated children's series Corn & Peg.

He was the subject of an interview in the documentary films Independents and Turtle Power: The Definitive History of the Teenage Mutant Ninja Turtles.

In the early 2000s Eastman was commissioned to create artwork for the drum kit used by System of a Down drummer John Dolmayan, an avid comic book collector and vendor. Dolmayan commissioned Eastman to illustrate the Ninja Turtles on one drum, while the art for other drums in the kit, which depicted other characters and scenes, were produced by Simon Bisley, Tim Vigil, and Arthur Adams.

== Art collection ==
Eastman purchased his first piece of original artwork ("a couple of pages that were penciled by Michael Golden and inked by Bob McLeod for Marvel Comics' Howard the Duck") at the Atlanta Fantasy Fair, the convention he and Laird attended in 1984. Collecting subsequently became "quite an addiction" for him, and combined with his experiences in getting his, and others', comics work recognised as "Art," led to him founding the Words & Pictures Museum, which operated as a brick-and-mortar museum from 1992 to 1999.

== Personal life ==
=== Family ===
Eastman has a son whom he had via surrogate. He was previously married to model and actress Julie Strain from 1995 to 2006.

Eastman married actress and producer Courtney Carr on October 5, 2013. They lived in San Diego with his son and pet dachshunds.

=== Religious beliefs ===
Eastman grew up in a church-going Christian family. He considers himself both "Christian" and "spiritual", saying that what he most appreciates is Christianity's message of universal love, which he believes is shared by many other religions.
