= Jim Lawson (comics) =

American comic book writer and artist (born 1960)

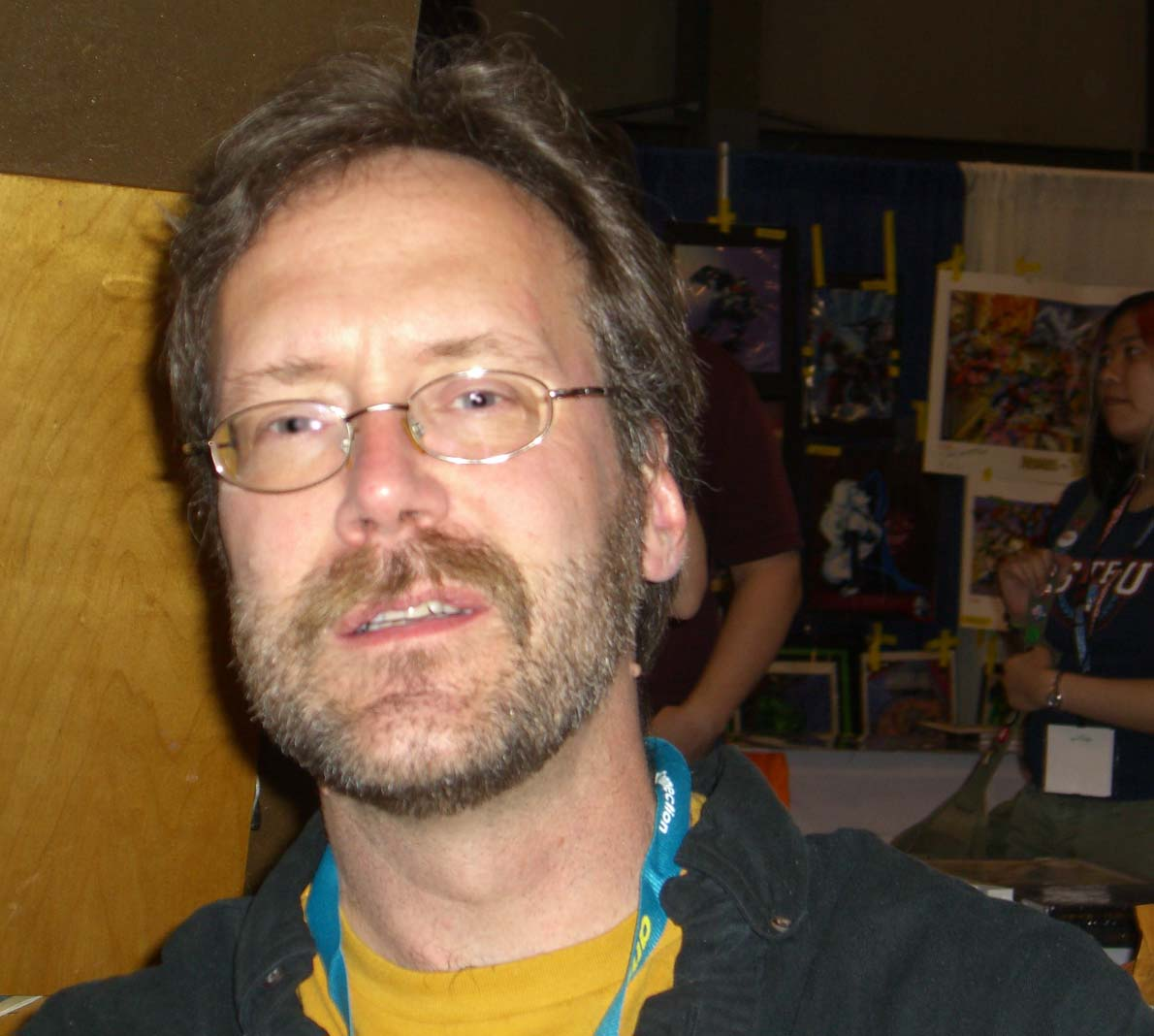
- Jim Lawson at the 2008 New York Comic Con
- Born: February 19, 1960 (age 66)
- Areas: Writer, Penciller, Artist, Inker, Letterer
- Notable works: Teenage Mutant Ninja Turtles
- Collaborators: Peter Laird

Jim Lawson (born February 19, 1960) is an American comic book writer and artist best known for his work on the Teenage Mutant Ninja Turtles comics.

== Career ==
Lawson graduated from Housatonic Valley Regional High School. For more than 20 years he was a writer and artist of TMNT comics, having created the Rat King and also co-created the series Planet Racers with Peter Laird. He is also the writer/artist of the black-and white-comic series Paleo: Tales of the Late Cretaceous.

In 2009 Lawson announced that he would depart from TMNT following Peter Laird's sale of the property to Viacom. However, he has continued working on various TMNT-related projects, for both official releases (the IDW versions) and independent fan projects.

Lawson was a participant in the 1988 drafting of the Creators' Bill of Rights.

In 2013 Lawson launched a Kickstarter campaign to fund a new project, a graphic novel series called Dragonfly. On February 19, 2019, Lawson launched a new Kickstarter campaign for his independent graphic novel and trade paperback, Dragonfly and Hellride. The campaign offered a reward for $1,500 to the buyer who received the book's property rights.
