= Steve Lavigne =

American comic book illustrator (born 1962)

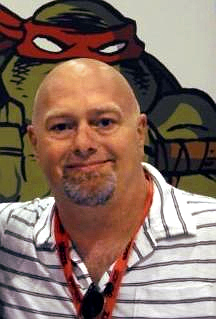
- Steve Lavigne at the 2009 San Diego Comic Convention.
- Born: September 22, 1962 (age 64)
- Areas: Writer, Penciller, Artist, Letterer, Colourist
- Notable works: Teenage Mutant Ninja Turtles

Steve Lavigne (born September 22, 1962) is an American comic book illustrator best known for his lettering and coloring on the Teenage Mutant Ninja Turtles title for Mirage Studios. He is the creator of Cudley the Cowlick, Sgt. Bananas, and Stump and Sling.

== Biography ==
Lavigne attended Westbrook High School in Westbrook, Maine with Teenage Mutant Ninja Turtles co-creator Kevin Eastman.

He inked the backup story in the 1989 collected Tales of the Teenage Mutant Ninja Turtles.

Lavigne, along with fellow Mirage Studios artist Ryan Brown, illustrated the artwork seen on the vast majority of officially licensed Turtles merchandise. The team of Lavigne Brown produced Teenage Mutant Ninja Turtles art for Burger King, Pez, Konami, New Line Cinema, Colorforms, and Playmates Toys among many others.

Lavigne was a participant in the drafting of the Creators' Bill of Rights.

He is also the basis for the character of Michaelangelo, one of the Teenage Mutant Ninja Turtles, according to TMNT co-creator Kevin Eastman.

He lives in Wells, Maine with wife Denise and children Cooper, Gracie and Jackson.

From 2012 to 2016 Steve owned a comic book shop & art gallery called Shellback Artworks in Wells Maine. The shop closed in Oct 2016. Shellback Artworks can now be found on Facebook and Instagram.

Steve is currently appearing at comic cons throughout the US, signing books and taking commission work. He does covers for TMNT/IDW comics as well.
