= Michael Dooney =

American comic book artist

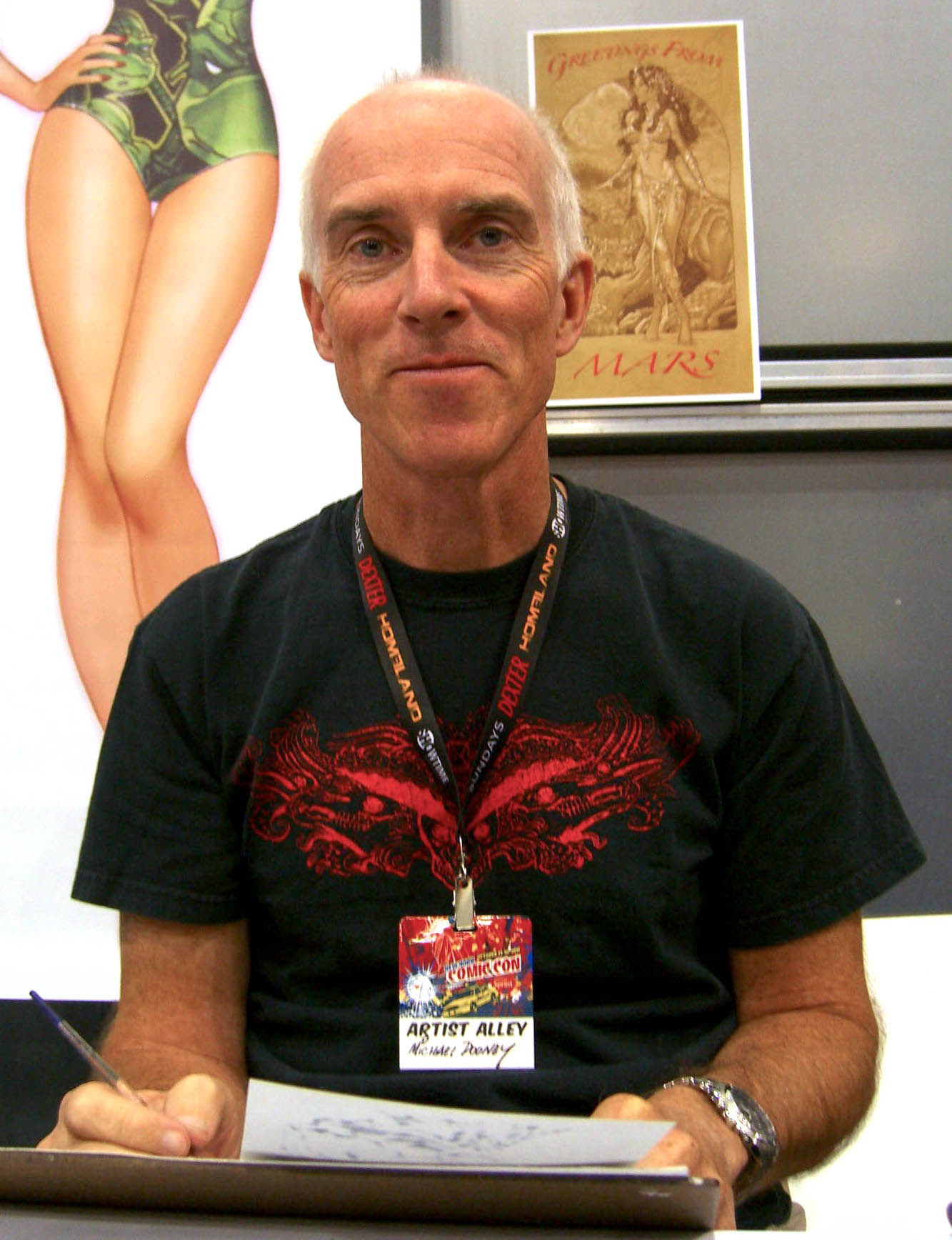
- Dooney at the 2011 New York Comic Con.
- Areas: Writer, Penciller, Artist, Inker, Editor, Letterer, Colourist
- Notable works: Teenage Mutant Ninja Turtles; Gizmo

Michael Dooney is an American comic book writer and artist and toy designer best known for his works on the Teenage Mutant Ninja Turtles series. Dooney also created the comic book series Gizmo in 1986 under Mirage Studios.
