= Creed (disambiguation) =

A creed is a statement of religious belief, in particular the

- Nicene Creed
- Apostles' Creed

Creed, Creede or The Creed may also refer to:

== Places ==
- Creed, Cornwall, a village in England, United Kingdom
- Creede, Colorado, United States

== Film ==
- Creed (film series), the spinoff film series to the Rocky film series centering on the character Adonis "Donnie" Creed
  - Creed (film), a 2015 spin-off/sequel to the Rocky film series, starring Michael B. Jordan and Sylvester Stallone
  - Creed II, a sequel to Creed, also starring Michael B. Jordan and Sylvester Stallone
  - Creed III, a sequel to Creed II, also starring Michael B. Jordan

== Music ==
- Creed (band), an American post-grunge band
- Creed (soundtrack), a soundtrack album for the 2015 film of the same name
- The Creed (album), a 2004 album by Avalon
- MC Creed, a British rapper and member of UK garage group Da Click
- "Creed", a song by Stray Kids from Karma, 2025
- Linda Creed, American songwriter, lyricist, background singer and record producer

== Literature ==
- Creed, a horror novel by English writer James Herbert
- "Creed", a poem by Steve Turner (writer)

== Government ==
- American Creed, a national patriotic symbol
- United States Postal Service creed (unofficial)

== Military ==
- Rifleman's Creed, also known as "the Creed of the United States Marine," though unofficial
- Ranger Creed, official creed of the US Army Rangers
- U.S. Soldier's Creed, a set of values and morals that all U.S. Army personnel are encouraged to live by
- Sailor's Creed, official creed of the U.S. Navy
- Airman's Creed, official creed of the U.S. Air Force

== Companies ==
- Creed (perfume house), a multinational perfume manufacturer
- Creed & Company, a British telecommunications company

== People ==
- Creed (surname), a list of people and characters with the surname
- Creed Napoleon "Frank" Bates (fl. 1898–1899), American professional baseball player
- Creed Black (1925–2011), American newspaper executive
- Creed H. Boucher (1888–1965), American naval officer
- Creed Bratton (born 1943), American singer and actor
- Creed Burlingame (1905–1985), United States Navy admiral
- Creed C. Hammond (1874–1940), United States Army general
- Creed Haymond (1893–1983), American athlete
- Creed Humphrey (born 1999), American football player
- Creed Taylor (1929–2022), American record producer
- Creed Willems (born 2003), American baseball player

== Fictional characters ==
- Creed, the character from the self-titled comic book originally published by Hall of Heroes
- Creed Diskenth, the antagonist in anime and manga series Black Cat
- Creed Bratton (character), a character from the U.S. television series The Office portrayed by the real-life Creed Bratton
- Apollo Creed, a character in the Rocky film series
- Donnie Creed, a character in the Creed film series of the Rocky franchise, son of Apollo Creed
- Creed (comics), a race of aliens from Image Comics

== Other uses ==
- "An American's Creed", a 1950s statement by American politician Dean Alfange

== See also ==
- Assassin's Creed, a 2007 video game
- The Creed, a 1999 video game
- Credo (disambiguation)
- Covenant (disambiguation)
