= Credo (disambiguation) =

A credo is a statement of belief, especially of a religious nature.

Credo or CREDO may also refer to:

- Nicene Creed
- Apostles' Creed

== Film ==
- Credo (1997 film)
- Credo: John Paul II, a 2006 documentary
- Credo (2008 film)
- Credo (company), Canadian film production company founded in 1975

== Literature ==
- Credo (novel), a 1996 novel by Melvyn Bragg
- Credo Reference or Credo, an online library of reference books
- Credo: Historical and Theological Guide to Creeds and Confessions of Faith in the Christian Tradition, a book by Jaroslav Pelikan
- Credo, a play by Craig Lucas

== Music ==
- Credo (music), a movement in a traditional musical setting of the Mass
  - "Credo" (Penderecki), a composition by Krzysztof Penderecki
  - "Credo" (Vivaldi), a choral composition by Antonio Vivaldi
  - "Credo" (Pärt), by Arvo Pärt (1968)
- Credo (Carola Häggkvist album) (2004)
- Credo (The Human League album) (2011)
- Credo (Jennifer Rush album) (1997)
  - "Credo" (Jennifer Rush song), the title song
- "Credo" (MacMillan), a composition by James MacMillan (2012)
- "Credo" (Zivert song) (2019)

== Other topics ==
- Credo (card game), a 1993 card game
- CREDO Mobile, a mobile phone company
- 21423 Credo, a main-belt asteroid
- Centre de recherche et de documentation sur l'Océanie (CREDO), research organization in France
- Cosmic-Ray Extremely Distributed Observatory, a scientific project in Krakow, Poland
- Credo knife, a callus shaver
- Credo Reference, an American information company
- Credo Station, a pastoral lease in Western Australia
- John Creasey (1908–1973), English writer whose pseudonyms include "Credo"
- Vusamazulu Credo Mutwa (1921–2020), South African writer

== See also ==
- Lorenzo di Credi, Italian Renaissance painter and sculptor
- Creed (disambiguation)
