= Covenant Health =

Covenant Health is the name of several healthcare provider organizations, including:

- Covenant Health (Alberta), a large Catholic health care organization in Alberta, Canada
- Covenant HealthCare, based in Saginaw, Michigan
- Covenant Health System in the Lubbock, Texas, metropolitan area
- Covenant Health Systems in New England
- Covenant Health (Tennessee) in the Knoxville metropolitan area

== See also ==
- Covenant (disambiguation)
