= Ryan Brown (comics) =

American comic book artist (born 1962)

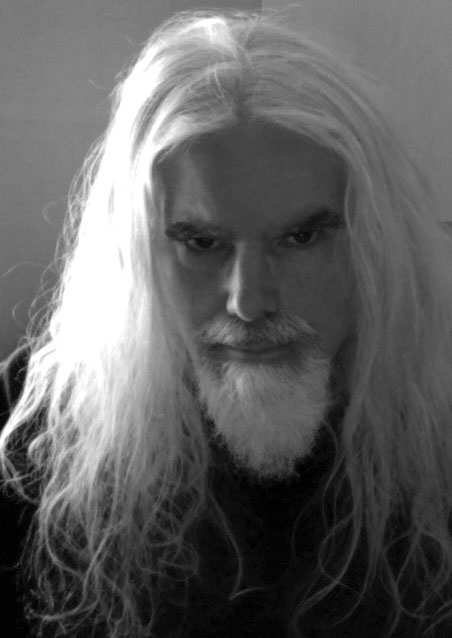
- Born: May 2, 1962 (age 64) Lodi, Ohio, U.S.
- Areas: Writer, Artist, Inker
- Notable works: Teenage Mutant Ninja Turtles; Wild West C.O.W.-Boys of Moo Mesa

Ryan Brown (born May 2, 1962) is a comic book writer and artist and toy designer best known for his work on Teenage Mutant Ninja Turtles and the animated series Wild West C.O.W.-Boys of Moo Mesa.

== Early life ==
Ryan Brown is a 1980 graduate of Norwayne High School, in Creston, Ohio.

== Career ==
Brown created Ninja April O'Neil in a 1985 pin-up published in the fourth printing of Teenage Mutant Ninja Turtles #1. He would later bring his interpretation of the character to the Teenage Mutant Ninja Turtles Adventures title published by Archie Comics. Brown began inking the Teenage Mutant Ninja Turtles title in 1985 and continued until 1988, when he and partner Steve Lavigne began producing artwork for licensed TMNT products. Brown worked primarily as inker over Lavigne's pencils.

In 1986 Brown and writer Doug Brammer published (under the company name Rion Productions) two issues of Rion 2990, a proposed four-issue limited series which was a tribute to Japanese comics. As such, it was one of the first examples of Original English-language manga. Rion Productions went out of business after Sunrise Distribution filed for bankruptcy.

As a Mirage Studios staff artist, Brown designed the Teenage Mutant Ninja Turtles action figure Farmer Mike for Playmates Toys. According to credits included on the back of turtles action figures, Brown also created Hothead, Scratch, Monty Moose, King Lionheart, Halfcourt, Wyrm, Scumbug, Leatherhead, Doctor El, Wingnut, Ray Fillet, Sandstorm, Mondo Gecko and Rock'N Roll Mondo Gecko. Scratch and Farmer Mike are un-credited on the back of the toy packaging, but Brown has confirmed at different convention appearances that he did create the cat burglar as well as designed Farmer Mike. Brown's comic book series The Selected is populated with his old unused TMNT toy designs.

In the late 1980s, Brown, with partner Stephen Murphy, created the Archie Teenage Mutant Ninja Turtles Adventures universe for Mirage Studios. The team of Brown and Murphy created the Mighty Mutanimals as a spin-off of the Adventures title. Brown inked over 80 covers for the Archie TMNT Adventures title.

His character Motorhead appeared in an issue of Teenage Mutant Ninja Turtles Magazine.

Brown created his concept the Hallowieners in 1984. Mirage Studios published a comic book about the giant mutant monster Halloween hot dogs in 1989.

Brown was a participant in the drafting of the Creator's Bill of Rights in 1988.

Brown also created the ABC Saturday morning animated television series Wild West C.O.W.-Boys of Moo Mesa (which debuted in 1992), and helped with development on its corresponding video game for the arcade by Konami. The game itself easily compared to Konami's own Western game Sunset Riders.

From 1995 to 2000, Brown's character Bog Swamp Demon appeared in a number of titles: first with Teenage Mutant Ninja Turtles vol. 2, then in a limited series published by Hall of Heroes, and later comics published by Image Comics and Numbskull Press.

Brown appears in the 2014 documentary film, Turtle Power: The Definitive History of the Teenage Mutant Ninja Turtles, from Paramount Pictures.
