= Kred =

Kred may refer to:

- Kred, Kobarid, Slovenia, a village
- KRED (FM), a radio station in Eureka, California, U.S.
- .kred, a top-level domain

== See also ==
- Cred (disambiguation)
