= Noncommissioned officer's creed =

US Army leadership/conduct tool

The U.S. Army Creed of the Noncommissioned Officer, otherwise known as the Noncommissioned Officer's Creed, and commonly shortened to the NCO creed, is a tool used in the United States Army to educate and remind enlisted leaders of their responsibilities and authority, and serves as a code of conduct. Each branch has their own version, and many have been altered over the years.

== Army Creed of the Noncommissioned Officer ==
In 1973, the United States Army was in turmoil as a result of the Vietnam War drawing to an end. Some of the contributing factors to the perceived degradation of the NCO Corps was the end of the draft "Modern Volunteer Army", Secretary of Defense Robert MacNamara's "Project 100,000" and the Noncommissioned officer candidate course. Many Sergeants were trained only to perform one specific job, for example, squad leaders in infantry units, and were no longer uniformly regarded as the well-rounded professionals of previous generations. The overhaul of the NCO Corps involved rewriting Field Manual 22–100, Leadership.

One of the initiatives to rebuild the NCO Corps was the NCO Education System, which included a then-newly created NCO Subcommittee of the Command and Leadership Committee in the Leadership Department at the United States Army Infantry School at Fort Benning. Besides training Soldiers at the Noncommissioned Officers Academy, select NCOs developed instructional material to be used throughout the Army. During a brainstorming session, SFC Earle Brigham and Jimmie Jakes Sr. were credited with writing on a sheet of paper the three letters "N C O", and the committee began building a creed, a "yardstick by which to measure themselves." When it was ultimately approved, The Creed of the Noncommssioned Officer was printed on the inside cover of the special texts issued to students, beginning in 1974. Though The Creed of the Noncommissioned Officer was submitted higher for approval and distribution Army-wide, it was not formalized by an official army publication until 11 years later.

The Army dedicated 2009 as the "Year of the NCO".

No one is more professional than I. I am a noncommissioned officer, a leader of Soldiers. As a noncommissioned officer, I realize that I am a member of a time honored corps, which is known as "The Backbone of the Army." I am proud of the Corps of Noncommissioned Officers, and will at all times conduct myself as to bring credit upon the Corps, the military service, and my country; regardless of the situation in which I find myself. I will not use my grade or position to attain pleasure, profit, or personal safety.

Competence is my watch-word. My two basic responsibilities will always be uppermost in my mind – accomplishment of my mission and the welfare of my Soldiers. I will strive to remain technically and tactically proficient. I am aware of my role as a noncommissioned officer, I will fulfill my responsibilities inherent in that role. All Soldiers are entitled to outstanding leadership; I will provide that leadership. I know my Soldiers, and I will always place their needs above my own. I will communicate consistently with my Soldiers, and never leave them uninformed. I will be fair and impartial when recommending both rewards and punishment.

Officers of my unit will have maximum time to accomplish their duties; they will not have to accomplish mine. I will earn their respect and confidence as well as that of my Soldiers. I will be loyal to those with whom I serve; seniors, peers, and subordinates alike. I will exercise initiative by taking appropriate action in the absence of orders. I will not compromise my integrity, nor my moral courage. I will not forget, nor will I allow my comrades to forget that we are professionals, noncommissioned officers, leaders!

The initial letters of each paragraph are, in order, N C O.

=== 'Tactically' and 'technically' discrepancy ===
For almost the first 20 years, many Army Creeds of the Noncommissioned Officer in publication had the second sentence in the second paragraph as I will strive to remain tactically and technically proficient. However, in 2001 the Army had a team of contractors who created FM 7-22.7, The Army Noncommissioned Officer Guide who apparently transposed the sentence to I will strive to remain technically and tactically proficient. To compound the problem the NCO Journal printed a story in the May 2010 edition which correctly identified that a field manual has precedence over other forms of publication (e.g., DA pamphlet), so it must be right. No historical research appeared to have been conducted, and it is unknown if any of the sources cited in the original research by Elder and Sanchez were consulted.

== Marine Corps ==
=== NCO creed ===
There have been several version of the Marine NCO creed. One version was revised in February 2006 under Navy and Marine Corps Directive 1500.58, Marine Corps Mentoring Program Guidebook. That directive has since been cancelled in July, 2017. The version of the NCO creed before that directive was canceled was:

I am the backbone of the United States Marine Corps, I am a Marine Noncommissioned Officer. I serve as part of the vital link between my commander (and all officers) and enlisted Marines. I will never forget who I am or what I represent. I will challenge myself to the limit and be ever attentive to duty. I am now, more than ever, committed to excellence in all that I do, so that I can set the proper example for other Marines. I will demand of myself all the energy, knowledge and skills I possess, so that I can instill confidence in those I teach. I will constantly strive to perfect my own skills and to become a good leader. Above all I will be truthful in all I say or do. My integrity shall be impeccable as my appearance. I will be honest with myself, with those under my charge and with my superiors. I pledge to do my best to incorporate all the leadership traits into my character. For such is the heritage I have received from that long, illustrious line of professionals who have worn the bloodstripe so proudly before me. I must give the very best I have for my Marines, my Corps and my Country for though today I instruct and supervise in peace, tomorrow, I may lead in war.

The unofficial NCO creed was an excerpt from Warrior Culture of the U.S. Marines, copyright 2001 Marion F. Sturkey. That version, which is still frequently used, read:

I am an NCO dedicated to training new Marines and influencing the old. I am forever conscious of each Marine under my charge, and by example will inspire them to the highest standards possible. I will strive to be patient, understanding, just, and firm. I will commend the deserving and encourage the wayward. I will never forget that I am responsible to my Commanding Officer for the morale, discipline, and efficiency of my Men. Their performance will reflect an image of me.

=== SNCO creed ===
Because the Marine Corps emphasizes the additional responsibility upon Staff Noncommissioned Officers, they have their own creed:

I am a Staff Noncommissioned Officer in the United States Marine Corps. As such, I am a member of the most unique group of professional military practitioners in the world. I am bound by duty to God, Country, and my fellow Marines to execute the demands of my position to and beyond what I believe to be the limits of my capabilities.

I realize I am the mainstay of Marine Corps discipline, and I carry myself with military grace, unbowed by the weight of command, unflinching in the execution of lawful orders, and unswerving in my dedication to the most complete success of my assigned mission.

Both my professional and personal demeanor shall be such that I may take pride if my juniors emulate me, and knowing perfection to lie beyond the grasp of any mortal hand, I shall yet strive to attain perfection that I may ever be aware of my needs and capabilities to improve myself. I shall be fair in my personal relations, just in the enforcement of discipline, true to myself and my fellow Marines, and equitable in my dealing with every man.

== Navy ==
During the course of this day, you have been caused to humbly accept challenge and face adversity. This you have accomplished with rare good grace. Pointless as some of these challenges may have seemed, there were valid, time-honored reasons behind each pointed barb. It was necessary to meet these hurdles with blind faith in the fellowship of Chief Petty Officers. The goal was to instill in you that trust is inherent with the donning of the uniform of a Chief. It was our intent to impress upon you that challenge is good; a great and necessary reality which cannot mar you – which, in fact, strengthens you.

In your future as a Chief Petty Officer, you will be forced to endure adversity far beyond that imposed upon you today. You must face each challenge and adversity with the same dignity and good grace you demonstrated today.

By experience, by performance, and by testing, you have been this day advanced to Chief Petty Officer. In the United States Navy – and only in the United States Navy – the rank of E7 carries with it unique responsibilities and privileges you are now bound to observe and expected to fulfill.

Your entire way of life is now changed. More will be expected of you; more will be demanded of you. Not because you are an E7 but because you are now a Chief Petty Officer. You have not merely been promoted one paygrade, you have joined an exclusive fellowship and, as in all fellowships, you have a special responsibility to your comrades, even as they have a special responsibility to you. This is why we in the United States Navy may maintain with pride our feelings of accomplishment once we have attained the position of Chief Petty Officer.

Your new responsibilities and privileges do not appear in print. They have no official standing; they cannot be referred to by name, number, nor file. They have existed for over 100 years, Chiefs before you have freely accepted responsibility beyond the call of printed assignment. Their actions and their performance demanded the respect of their seniors as well as their juniors.

It is now required that you be the fountain of wisdom, the ambassador of good will, the authority in personal relations as well as in technical applications. "Ask the Chief" is a household phrase in and out of the Navy. You are now the Chief.

The exalted position you have now achieved – and the word exalted is used advisedly – exists because of the attitude and performance of the Chiefs before you. It shall exist only as long as you and your fellow Chiefs maintain these standards.

It was our intention that you never forget this day. It was our intention to test you, to try you, and to accept you. Your performance has assured us that you will wear "the hat" with the same pride as your comrades in arms before you.

We take a deep and sincere pleasure in clasping your hand, and accepting you as a Chief Petty Officer in the United States Navy.

== Air Force ==
The US Air Force has utilized several different creeds (the NCO Creed, the SNCO Creed, the Chief's creed, the First Sergeant's Creed, the Security Forces Creed, etc.). However, as of April 2007 all the creeds used in the Air Force were replaced by The Airman's Creed.

=== Noncommissioned Officer creed ===
No one is more professional than I. I am a Noncommissioned Officer: a leader of people. I am proud of the Noncommissioned Officer corps and will, at all times, conduct myself so as to bring credit upon it. I will not use my grade or position to attain profit or safety.

So, what does this mean to me as an NCO? What this means is, I as an NCO will continually seek to better myself by going to my career schooling and absorbing what I learn from my senior NCO's, it means that I will lead to the best of my abilities and treat all soldiers with respect, courteousness and fairness.

Competence is my watchword. I will strive to remain tactically and technically proficient. I will always be aware of my role as a Noncommissioned Officer. I will fulfill my responsibilities and display professionalism at all times. I will strive to know my people and use their skills to the maximum degree possible. I will always place their needs above my own and will communicate with my supervisor and my people and never leave them uninformed

So, what does this mean to me as an NCO? It means that I will do my best to be proficient in my assigned jobs and learn from past tasks, it means that I will stay cognizant of my role as an NCO and fulfill my duties to the best of my abilities and take pride in what I do, no matter how others portray my accomplishments. It means that I know my soldiers and know how to use them in a manner that promotes the units needs. It means that I will take care of my soldiers fairly and mentor them to become better soldiers and would not ask them to do something I wouldn't do or have not done before. It means to me that I will keep my soldiers and senior NCO'S informed and they will keep me informed of changes and any information that pertains to me.

I will exert every effort and risk any ridicule to successfully accomplish my assigned duties. I will not look at a person and see any race, creed, color, religion, sex, age, or national origin, for I will only see the person; nor will I ever show prejudice or bias. I will lead by example and will resort to disciplinary action only when necessary.

SO, what does this mean to me as an NCO? It means I will take pride in my assigned duties and accomplish them to the best of my abilities. It means to me that I see that person not by race, creed, color, religion, sex, age, or origin but as an individual. It means I will treat all soldiers fairly, equally without malice or without bias. It means to me that I will lead by example and only resort to disciplinary action when appropriate It means to me that I will also give positive counseling when soldiers go above their responsibilities.

I will carry out the orders of my superiors to the best of ability and will always obey the decisions of my superiors. I will give all officers my maximum support to ensure mission accomplishments. I will earn their respect, obey their orders, and establish a high degree of integrity with them. I will exercise initiative in the absence of orders and will make decisive and accurate decisions. I will never compromise my integrity, nor my moral courage. I will not forget that I am a Professional, a Leader, but above all a Noncommissioned Officer.

=== SNCO creed ===
I am a Senior Noncommissioned Officer in the United States Air Force. I hold allegiance to my country, devotion to duty, and personal integrity above all. I wear my rank of authority with dignity, I promote the highest standards of conduct, appearance, and performance by setting the example. I seek no favors because of my rank. I am devoted to the concept of service rather than personal gain. I uphold the traditions of senior noncommissioned officers who precede me. I manage resources under my control with astute efficiency, and lead the way with the highest level of competence. I always strive to merit the respect of my fellow senior noncommissioned officers and of all with whom I come in contact.

== See also ==
- Code of the U.S. Fighting Force
- U.S. Soldier's Creed
- Rifleman's Creed
- Sailor's Creed
- Airman's Creed
- Creed of the United States Coast Guardsman
- Ranger Creed
