= Creed of the United States Coast Guardsman =

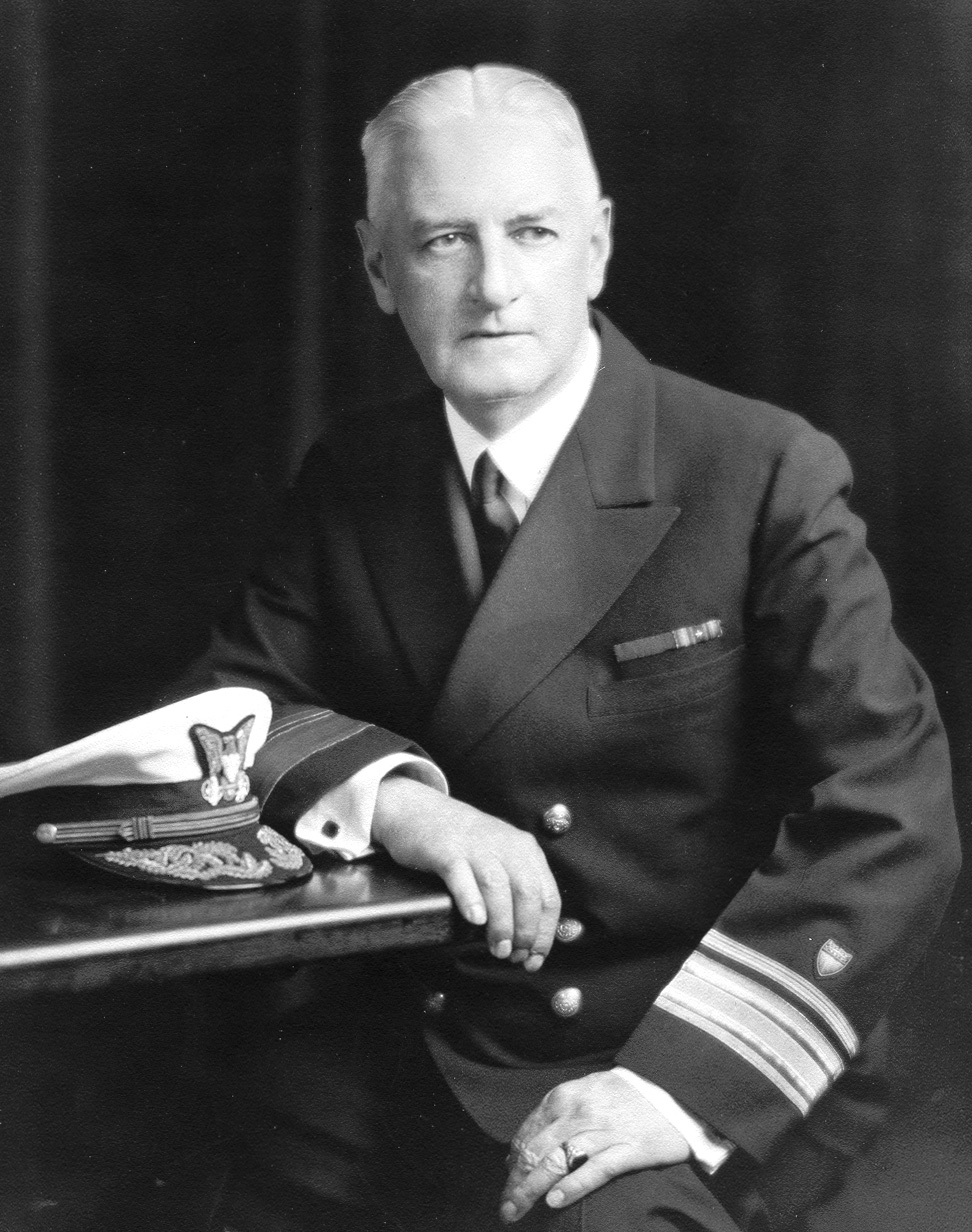
Vice Admiral Harry G. Hamlet, USCG

The Creed of the United States Coast Guardsman was written in 1938 by Vice Admiral Harry G. Hamlet, who served as Commandant of the Coast Guard from 1932 to 1936. According to former commandant Robert Papp, the creed described the duties and responsibilities that binds the group of coast guardsmen together as "shipmates".

== The creed ==
Creed of the United States Coast Guardsman

I am proud to be a United States Coast Guardsman.
I revere that long line of expert seamen who by their devotion to duty and sacrifice of self have made it possible for me to be a member of a service honored and respected, in peace and in war, throughout the world.
I never, by word or deed, will bring reproach upon the fair name of my service, nor permit others to do so unchallenged.
I will cheerfully and willingly obey all lawful orders.
I will always be on time to relieve, and shall endeavor to do more, rather than less, than my share.
I will always be at my station, alert and attending to my duties.
I shall, so far as I am able, bring to my seniors solutions, not problems.
I shall live joyously, but always with due regard for the rights and privileges of others.
I shall endeavor to be a model citizen in the community in which I live.
I shall sell life dearly to an enemy of my country, but give it freely to rescue those in peril.
With God's help, I shall endeavor to be one of His noblest Works...

A UNITED STATES COAST GUARDSMAN.

== See also ==
- Noncommissioned officer's creed
- Soldier's Creed
- Quartermaster Creed
- Ranger Creed
- Rifleman's Creed (USMC)
- Sailor's Creed
- Airman's Creed
