= Credo (MacMillan) =

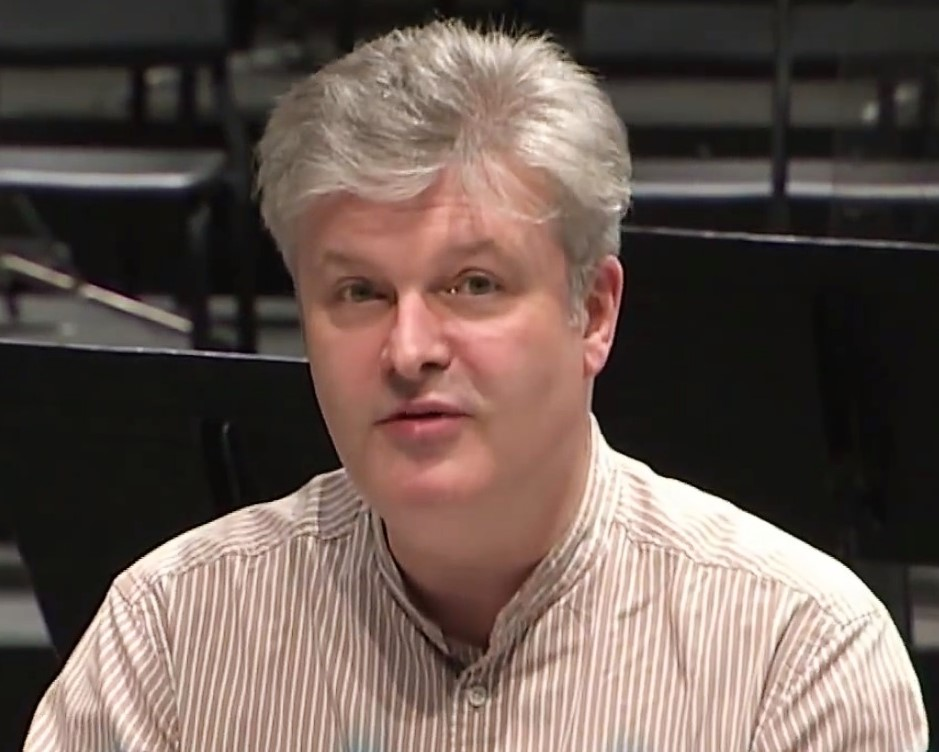
James MacMillan in 2012

The Credo is a composition for choir and orchestra set to the text of the Nicene Creed by the Scottish composer James MacMillan. It was first performed August 7, 2012 at The Proms in Royal Albert Hall, London, by the BBC Philharmonic, the Manchester Chamber Choir, the Northern Sinfonia Chorus, and the Rushley Singers under the conductor Juanjo Mena.

== Composition ==
The Credo has a duration of roughly 20 minutes and is composed in three movements:

1. Pater
2. Filius
3. Spiritus Sanctus

=== Instrumentation ===
The work is scored for an SATB choir and orchestra comprising two flutes, oboe, cor anglais, two clarinets, two bassoons (2nd doubling contrabassoon), two horns, two trumpets, timpani, and strings.

== Reception ==
Reviewing the world premiere, George Hall of The Guardian praised the Credo, writing:

As usual with MacMillan, the music speaks directly, though it is not without subtleties in the skilful choral writing, some of which reference other religious idioms, notably Renaissance polyphony, and something like the ornately decorated style of Western Isles psalm singing; there's also a brief tribute to fellow-Catholic composer Olivier Messiaen in the woodwind birdsong that ends the first movement. While not all the musical material is equally memorable, the best of it is characteristically bold and resolute.

Conversely, Ivan Hewett of The Daily Telegraph criticized MacMillan's mix of traditional and contemporary tonalities, remarking, "Sometimes this worked well, as in the Crucifixus section, where two high violas entwined beautifully round the voices. But at length the sheer profusion of styles became bewildering. We heard Messiaen-like bird twitterings, folk-like decorative swirls. There were minatory brass outcries when the text spoke of judgment, and certain phrases were shouted three times." He continued, "This was presumably a Trinitarian reference, but in musical terms it just felt hectoring. As often happens in MacMillan's religious music, the green shoots of musical invention were crushed by the heavy-handed symbolism.

== See also ==
- Credo (Vivaldi)
