= Hall of Heroes =

Defunct American independent comic book publishing company

- Founded: 1993
- Defunct: 1999
- Country of origin: United States of America
- Headquarters location: Elkhart, Indiana
- Fiction genres: Horror, Fantasy

Hall of Heroes was an American independent comic book company that existed in the mid-to-late 1990s. Based in Elkhart, Indiana, Hall of Heroes operated from 1993 to 1999.

The company's longest-running titles were two volumes of the anthology Hall of Heroes Presents, which totaled 9 issues; Matt Martin's Vortex (6 issues); and Bog Swamp Demon, which ran 4 issues. (Stephen R. Bissette contributed covers for Bog Swamp Demon.)

Creators associated with Hall of Heroes were Ethan Van Sciver, Keith Alan Morris, Doug Brammer, Trent Kaniuga, Matt Martin, and Andy Brase.

== Titles ==
- Bog Swamp Demon by Ryan Brown et al. (4 issues, 1996–1997; later stories published by Image Comics and Numbskull Press)
- Creed by Trent Kaniuga (2 issues, 1994–1995; title later acquired by Lightning Comics, then Avatar Press, and then Image Comics)
- Cyberfrog by Ethan van Sciver (2 issues; 1994; title later acquired by Harris Publications)
- Dragon's Bane: The New Dark Age by Harry Bauer and Sean Murray (3 issues plus 1 ashcan, 1999–2000)
- Fuzzy Buzzard! and Friends by Ethan Van Sciver (1 issue, April 1995)
- Hall of Heroes Presents (3 issues, 1993) featuring:
  - Dead Bolt by Trent Kaniuga
  - Mourning Star
  - Nadir
- Hall of Heroes Presents (6 issues, 1996–1997) featuring:
  - The Becoming
  - Elijah's Fury in the Last Days by Keith Alan Morris
  - The Fuzz
  - Power of the Golem by Doug Brammer and Jerry Beck
  - Salamandroid
  - Sinnister
  - Slingers
  - Turaxx by Andy Brase
- Hall of Heroes: Halloween Special (1997)
- Hall of Horrors (1 issue, 1997) with stories featuring Grin, Bog, and Sinister.
- Sleepwalking (3 issues, 1996–1997)
- Snowman (3 issues, 1995–1996) by Matt Martin
- Vortex (6 issues, 1993–1995) by Matt Martin
