= Baby Not on Board =

- Family Guy episode
- Episode no.: Season 7 Episode 4
- Directed by: Julius Wu
- Written by: Mark Hentemann
- Production code: 6ACX07
- Original air date: November 2, 2008

Guest appearances
- Jon Benjamin as Carl; Joe Flaherty; Jacob Pressman

Episode chronology
← Previous "Road to Germany"	Next → "The Man with Two Brians"
- Family Guy season 7

"Baby Not on Board" is the fourth episode in the seventh season of the American animated television series Family Guy. It originally aired on the Fox network in the United States on November 2, 2008. The episode features Stewie (voiced by Seth MacFarlane) after he is accidentally left at home when the Griffins head for the Grand Canyon. The family soon notice his absence and rush home; however, Peter (also voiced by MacFarlane) makes it more difficult for his family because of his immature behavior. Meanwhile, Stewie realizes how much he depends on his family while he is alone.

The episode was written by Mark Hentemann and directed by Julius Wu. It received mixed reviews from critics for its storyline and cultural references. According to Nielsen ratings, it was viewed in 9.97 million homes in its original airing. The episode featured a guest performance by Jon Benjamin, along with several recurring guest voice actors for the series. "Baby Not on Board" was released on DVD along with eight other episodes from the season on June 16, 2009.

== Plot ==
Peter visits the Quahog Mini-Mart where Chris works, after a visit to the local spa with his friends. After he threatens to sue the store for Chris' "sexual remarks", Peter is given an unlimited gas coupon for a year by Carl. Peter begins to take advantage of the card, even taking a trip into space, until Lois suggests that the family travel to the Grand Canyon. They leave early the next morning but inadvertently leave Stewie behind at home, only realizing that when they visit the site of 9/11. They try to contact Joe but he doesn't answer as he is busy cleaning his wheelchair. They then contact Cleveland and Quagmire to ask them to look after Stewie. After not receiving any calls from either of them, Lois insists that the family return home to Stewie. While driving the car, Peter somehow enters the car next to them, causing the Griffins' car to crash. When the family attempts to ride a train home, Peter spends the last of their saved money on curtain rings. Lois is furious and blames all their misfortunes on Peter's stupidity, only to feel ashamed when he informs her that everyone else respects him for who he is. Eventually, Brian is able to get the family a ride in a pickup truck bound for Quahog.

Meanwhile, Stewie finds out that he has been left alone, and takes his solitude to his advantage. When Cleveland and Quagmire arrive, Stewie believes that they are intruders and sprays tear gas all around them to knock them out. Stewie realizes his mistake. He chains them to the Griffins' basement wall and forces them to watch the DirecTV help channel on a continuous loop. When Stewie consumes all of the food in the house, he applies for a job at fast food restaurant McBurgertown but is eventually fired for stealing food, despite his insistence it was due to be thrown out. Eventually, Stewie realizes how much he depends on his family and is thrilled to see them return.

The episode ends with a scene of Cleveland and Quagmire monotonously reciting what is being said on TV; in the broadcast version, Cleveland eventually tells Quagmire, "Did I tell you I'm getting a spinoff?", while in the DVD release Quagmire simply curses in frustration.

== Production ==
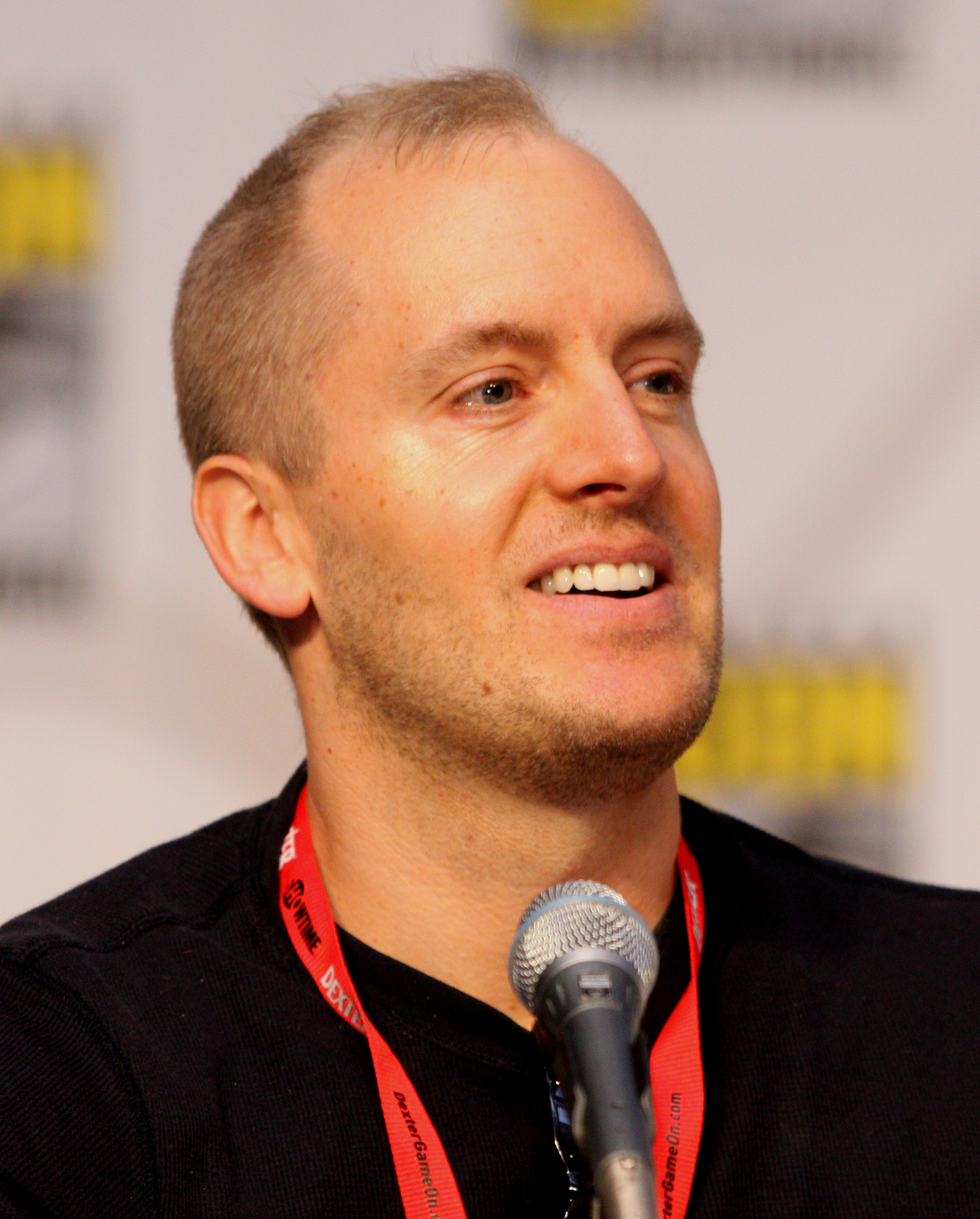
Series writer Mark Hentemann wrote "Baby Not on Board".

"Baby Not on Board" was written by eventual series showrunner and executive producer Mark Hentemann, who joined the show as a writer in its third season. It was directed by Julius Wu on his first episode of the season, although he would go on to direct the episode "420" later in the season. Series regulars Peter Shin and James Purdum served as supervising directors for the episode. The episode marked the first time since the show's creation that celebrities do not feature wide, circular eyes. The staff wanted to make the celebrities look more realistic in contrast to the regular characters; a good example of this can be seen on Patrick Swayze's character design for the episode. The Standards and Practices had a problem with Peter saying "masturbate", so staff writers edited it to "rub one out". The episode revealed that the character Cleveland Brown was going to start in his own show, which turned out to be the Family Guy spin-off, The Cleveland Show, which later premiered in September 2009.

"Baby Not on Board", along with the first eight episodes of the seventh season, were released on DVD by 20th Century Fox in the United States and Canada on June 16, 2009, one month after it had completed broadcast on television. The "Volume 7" DVD release features bonus material including deleted scenes, animatics, and commentaries for every episode.

In addition to the regular cast, voice actor Jon Benjamin, actor Joe Flaherty, and actor Jacob Pressman guest starred in the episode. Recurring voice actors Alexandra Breckenridge, writer Steve Callaghan, writer Danny Smith, writer Alec Sulkin, and writer John Viener made minor appearances. Recurring guest voice actors Adam West and Patrick Warburton made guest appearances as well.

== Cultural references ==
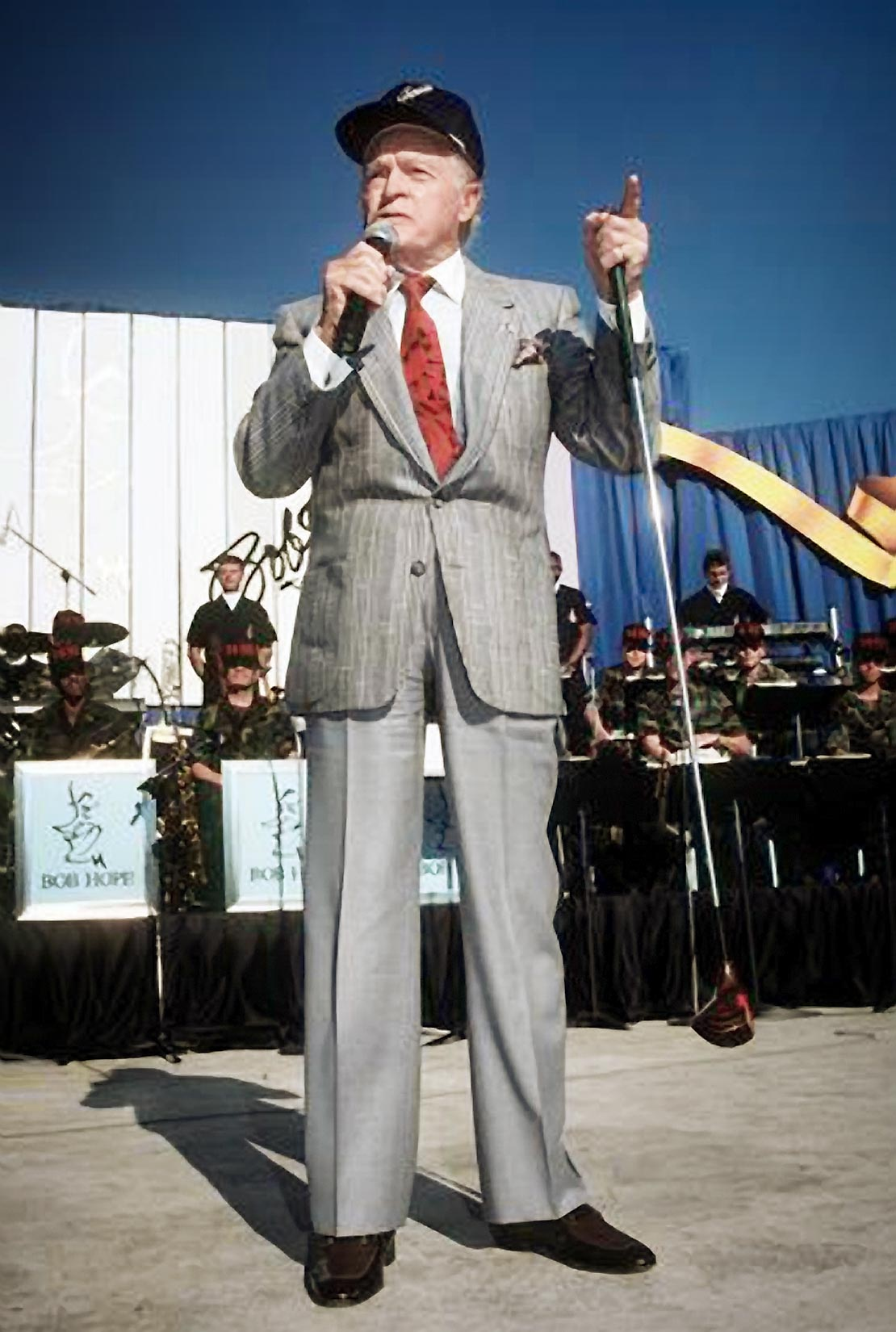
Another cultural reference included Stewie mistaking Quagmire for Bob Hope.

"Baby Not on Board" makes several media references. The plot itself is inspired by the film Home Alone. At the Quahog Day Spa, Peter mentions that he needs the sauna's treatment after a stressful morning; the scene cuts to a non-sequitur that parodies the opening scene of Back to the Future. Another scene in the spa references the film Ghost; representations of the film's stars, Patrick Swayze and Demi Moore, are on top of Peter's back giving him a massage. After Lois chastises Peter, he recites the speech John Candy made in Planes, Trains, and Automobiles nearly verbatim. Chris asks his friend why in The Lord of the Rings films Frodo and Gandalf walk to get to Mordor instead of taking the Eagle that was used at the end of the story. When driving to the Grand Canyon, the family sings Bette Midler's "The Rose". When Stewie chains Cleveland and Quagmire to the basement wall, he forces them to watch the DirecTV help channel.

When Lois says they have not heard from Joe, he is seen screaming the Rifleman's Creed at his wheelchair like marines do with their rifles in the bootcamp sequence in Full Metal Jacket. One of the cutaways depicts Robin Williams in the film Patch Adams, where he fruitlessly attempts to amuse child patients with his comedy routines, driving one child patient to unplug his life support. When the Griffins return home to Stewie, the background music is an instrumental of "Somewhere In My Memory" by John Williams, which scores a similar scene in Home Alone. When Stewie is exploring the house he finds a Hustler magazine under his brother's bed, curious of what a vagina looks like. He instantly becomes horrified by the sight of a vagina on one of the pages, then proceeds to destroy the magazine by opening fire on it with an M3 submachine gun he retrieves from hammerspace, emptying the entire magazine of the weapon. Stewie mentions that Aquaman is pretty useless if the crime does not take place on water. Other references included jokes about the television series Lost and actors John Forsythe and Sean Connery.

== Reception ==
In its original broadcast on Fox in the United States on November 2, 2008, "Baby Not on Board" was watched by 9.97 million homes and acquired a 5.0 Nielsen rating, the audience measurement systems developed to determine the audience size and composition of television programming in the United States, making it the highest rated episode of the season.

The episode received mixed reviews from television sources and critics. Steve Heisler of The A.V. Club gave the episode a C, calling it "without a doubt, the most meta episode I've seen in quite some time" and said that "if Family Guy wants to make the show itself the butt of every joke, it needs to ramp up the conflict and tone down on the flights of fancy–most of those are funny for a bit, but excess can ruin just about anything." Another complaint of the episode were the Back to the Future references and the storyline.

Ahsan Haque of IGN gave the episode a negative review, calling it "definitely one of the worst Family Guy episodes in years". He criticized the jokes, calling some pointless and most of them tasteless, saying that the funnier moments of the episode were not enough to make it a worthwhile episode. Robin Pierson of The TV Critic also gave the episode a negative review, calling it "pointless television", but said that it featured some entertaining jokes.
