= Lightning Comics (1990s) =

Defunct American independent comic book publishing company

- Founded: 1993
- Founder: Joseph and Steve Zyskowski
- Defunct: 1998
- Country of origin: United States
- Headquarters location: Oakland County, Michigan
- Key people: Greg Weed
- Publication types: Comic books
- Fiction genres: "Bad girl" comics, adventure, fantasy
- Imprints: Insomnia

Lightning Comics was an American independent comic publisher headquartered in Oakland County, Michigan, that operated from 1993 to 1998.

Founders Joseph and Steve Zyskowski wanted to make comic books unlike the ones they had read before. They believed the newest comics "seemed to lack substance."

The first comic published by Lightning Comics, Bloodfire #1, sold 50,000 comics. The company's idea was to make each issue a limited printing to enhance collectability. Also, after that first book, Greg Weed was hired to move the company from marker to airbrush. Bloodfire eventually ran 13 issues. Other long-running titles for Lightning Comics were Judgement Day and Perg, which ran 8 issues each. Trent Kaniuga's Creed appeared in a number of titles, one-shots, and crossovers, including one with the Teenage Mutant Ninja Turtles. Similar, Hellina appeared in more than 15 separate specials, crossovers, and one-shots.

Lightning Comics later became the first of several publishers to capitalize on the "Bad Girl" trend in comics by offering limited "nude cover" variations of comics featuring Hellina, Catfight, and its other female heroines.

Artists associated with Lightning Comics were Julius Jackson, Paul Abrams, Terral Lawrence, Karl Kerschl, and Eric Pence.

During its six years of existence, Lightning Comics headquarters changed locations many times, mostly within Oakland County. Various headquarters included Dearborn Heights, Farmington Hills, Novi, Southfield, and Wixom.

== Titles published (selected) ==
- Bloodfire (13 issues, 1993–1994)
- Catfight (1 issue, 1995; under the Insomnia imprint)
- Claire Voyante (1 issue, 1996)
- Creed (6 titles, 1995–1996; property acquired from Hall of Heroes, then published by Avatar Press and finally by Image Comics)
- Curse of the Dreadwolf (1 issue, 1994)
- DeathAngel (1 issue, 1997)
- Hellina (many one-shots, 1995–1997)
- Judgement Day (8 issues, 1993–1994)
- Perg (8 issues, 1993–1994)
- Sinthia (2 issues, 1997–1998)
- “Sinja” (4 issues, 1995–1996)
- “The four Kunoichi” (8 issues, 1995–1996)
