= The Man with Two Brians =

- Family Guy episode
- Episode no.: Season 7 Episode 5
- Directed by: Dominic Bianchi
- Written by: John Viener
- Production code: 6ACX09
- Original air date: November 9, 2008

Guest appearances
- Johnny Knoxville as himself; Will Sasso as Bernie the Hamster; Camille Guaty as Puerto Rican Girl

Episode chronology
| ← Previous "Baby Not on Board" | Next → "Tales of a Third Grade Nothing" |
- Family Guy season 7

"The Man with Two Brians" is the fifth episode in the seventh season and the 115th episode overall of the American animated television series Family Guy. It premiered on Fox in the United States on November 9, 2008. The episode centers on anthropomorphic dog Brian after he is injured during a stunt being enacted by his owner, Peter, after he watches Jackass with his friends. The family comes to realize that Brian may be getting too old, so Peter brings home a new, optimistic dog. Brian is prompted to leave when his family begins to favor New Brian over him.

The episode was written by John Viener and marked the directorial debut of Dominic Bianchi. It received generally favorable reviews from critics for its storyline and various cultural references. According to Nielsen ratings, the episode was viewed by 8.60 million households in its original airdate. Johnny Knoxville, Will Sasso and Camille Guaty provided guest performances in the episode.

== Plot ==
After watching Jackass, Peter and his friends, Cleveland, Quagmire, and Joe, are impressed into filming their own highly dangerous stunts. In one stunt, Peter attempts to jump a lake but instead crashes into a tree, causing him to fall into the lake and become incapacitated. Brian swims out to save him from drowning, but strains his back during the rescue and also ends up stranded in the water along with Peter, before being rescued by Joe. Lois scolds Peter for his actions, since Brian is becoming old and has been smoking and drinking. Peter begins to grow upset about their dog's age, so he buys another dog and names him New Brian. His positive attitude and desirable personality make Brian feel like an outcast, especially when the Griffins begin to ignore him. He ultimately decides to leave the house, while his family begins to miss him.

Meanwhile, New Brian's constant cheerfulness begins to aggravate Stewie. Stewie pleads for Brian to return, but he informs him that as long as New Brian is there, he has no place in the Griffin household. Stewie reveals to New Brian that he does not like several of his traits, including how he humps the leg of one of their chairs; in response, New Brian responds that Stewie's teddy bear, Rupert, enjoys his humping, and smugly reveals that he had humped Rupert non-consensually for two straight hours the day before. An enraged Stewie kills and dismembers New Brian offscreen, disposes of his bloody remains in the garbage and forges a suicide note for his family. The Griffins ultimately accept Brian back, while Stewie, traumatized by what has happened to Rupert, frantically washes him in the shower.

== Production ==
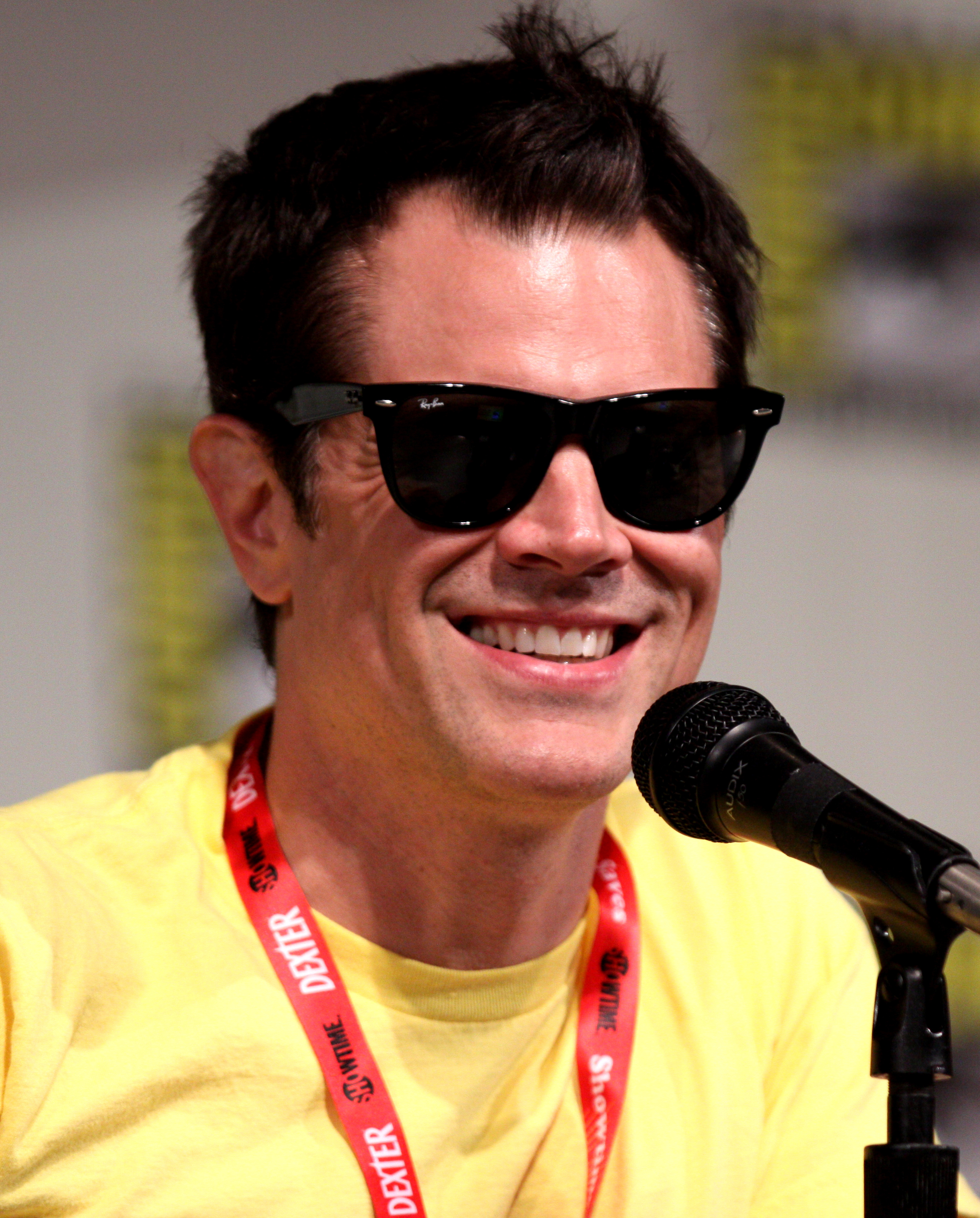
Johnny Knoxville guest starred as himself in the episode.

"The Man with Two Brians" was written by John Viener and directed by Dominic Bianchi. In the storyboard animatic scene of Brian's rescue of a drowning Peter, music from Rambo: First Blood Part II was used. The scene in which Peter broke his neck and the design of New Brian were both based on drawings by creator Seth MacFarlane. New Brian was supposed to be a Golden Retriever, but his color was changed so that he would stand out from the yellow kitchen. In the scene when Peter wears the costume from The Greatest American Hero, the theme from E.T. was originally used. Several scenes were cut when the episode aired on television, mostly due to lack of time. The song New Brian sang to Peter was written by series writer Alec Sulkin. The original ending for the episode was a Beverly Hills, 90210 basketball joke, but it was cut.

"The Man with Two Brians", along with the first eight episodes of the seventh season were released on DVD by 20th Century Fox in the United States and Canada on June 16, 2009. The "Volume 7" DVD release features bonus material including deleted scenes, animatics, and commentaries for every episode.

Johnny Knoxville, star of Jackass, provided his own voice in this episode, and Will Sasso and Camille Guaty guest starred as various characters. The episode's writer, John Viener, provided the voice of New Brian. Recurring voice actors and writers Kirker Butler, Mark Hentemann, Danny Smith and Alec Sulkin made minor appearances in the episode.

== Cultural references ==
The television series Jackass is referred to frequently by Peter and his neighbors, and is the principal reason that they try to do stunts. Johnny Knoxville cameoes and takes a shotgun blast which blows off part of his face. In the episode, while being launched off a ramp and flying through the air, Peter wears the costume from The Greatest American Hero and sings the series' theme song.

Before New Brian sings "I Like Farts," Peter exclaims "Oh, you've got a guitar!" in reference to a scene from the 1980 movie Airplane!, in which the flight attendant Randy plays guitar for a sick girl on her way to receive a heart transplant.

Peter dresses up like a stereotypical adolescent bully featured in 1980s films, and makes references to Pretty in Pink, No Retreat, No Surrender and The Karate Kid. He then looks at the ocean on a pier as Howard Jones' song, "No One Is to Blame", plays.

Casey Kasem made an appearance in a deleted cutaway gag, where he was heard reading a sadistic Long Distance Dedication directly from a fictional American Top 40 broadcast on a radio right next to Peter, who was sitting on a living room chair.

== Reception ==
In its original American broadcast, "The Man with Two Brians" was watched by 8.60 million households according to the Nielsen ratings. The episode acquired a 4.3 rating in the 18–49 demographic, and was the most-watched show in the Animation Domination block that night. Family Guy finished fourth in its timeslot, after NBC's Sunday Night Football, ABC's Desperate Housewives and CBS's The Amazing Race.

The episode received generally favorable reviews from television sources and critics. Ahsan Haque of IGN gave the episode 7.5/10 and said: "While it featured more than [...] a couple of genuinely unfunny ideas, this episode succeeds for the most part. [...] While this episode definitely won't make anyone's top ten list of great Family Guy, there was a much better balance between random humor and storytelling in this outing". Genevieve Koski of The A.V. Club gave the episode an A−, and said that Family Guy "started things out on the wrong foot with an oh-so-relevant Jackass storyline. [...] Most of the Jackass stuff was way too stale–Peter jackknifing Quagmire into the crate of bees notwithstanding–but thankfully it was just setup for a far superior storyline, the introduction of a younger 'New Brian'".

Robin Pierson of The TV Critic was more critical about the episode, and gave it 32/100 and said: "As usual the problem with this episode is that there is no point to it. [The episode had] some needless jokes but others which were bearable and a logical enough story even though it addressed nothing.
