= Cred (disambiguation) =

Cred is sometimes used to refer to credibility.

Cred or CRED may also refer to:

- Cred (company), an Indian financial services company
- Centre for Research on the Epidemiology of Disasters, at the University of Louvain, Belgium
- Commission on Race and Ethnic Disparities, established in 2020 in the United Kingdom
- Create, read, edit and delete also known as CRUD (U for Update)
- Cred, a fictional drink featured in South Park (Not Suitable for Children), 2023

== See also ==
- Creed (disambiguation)
