= Doug Brammer =

American comic book writer (born 1963)

- Born: May 13, 1963 (age 63)
- Area: Writer
- Notable works: Bog Swamp Demon
- Collaborators: Ryan Brown

Doug Brammer (born May 13, 1963) is an American comic book writer. He is known for his collaborations with artist Ryan Brown as well as his association with the swamp monster character Bog Swamp Demon (created by Brown).

== Biography ==
In 1986 Brammer and Brown published (under the company name Rion Productions) two issues of Rion 2990, a proposed four-issue limited series which was a tribute to Japanese comics. As such, it was one of the first examples of Original English-language manga.

Again working with Brown, Brammer wrote a story in the "Teenage Mutant Ninja Turtles Meet Archie" edition of Teenage Mutant Ninja Turtles Adventures (1991) and contributed to other TMNT stories in 1992. He followed that by scripting the 1992–1993 limited series Wild West C.O.W.-Boys of Moo Mesa (based on the animated series developed by Ryan Brown) for Archie Comics.

With Brown again, in 1996–1997 he co-wrote Hall of Heroes four-issue limited series Bog Swamp Demon (a character that originated in the pages of Teenage Mutant Ninja Turtles Adventures). For the Hall of Heroes Presents anthology, Brammer created the Power of the Golem feature, illustrated by Jerry Beck. Continuing with Bog Swamp Demon, Brammer wrote Bog backup stories in Dan Berger's ' comic book series, published by Numbskull Press from 1998 to 2000. The stories were illustrated by David Vance.

Brammer appears in the 2014 documentary film Turtle Power: Definitive History of the Teenage Mutant Ninja Turtles from Paramount Pictures.

Brammer currently lives in Wooster, Ohio.
