= Wild West C.O.W.-Boys of Moo Mesa =

American TV series

- Promotional poster
- Genre: Western; Weird West
- Created by: Ryan Brown
- Written by: Cliff Ruby (season 1); Elana Lesser (season 1); Rich Fogel (season 2); Mark Seidenberg (season 2)
- Voices of: Pat Fraley; Jim Cummings; Jeff Bennett; Joe Piscopo; Michael Greer; Charity James; Kay Lenz; Troy Davidson; Danny Mann; Michael Horse
- Theme music composer: Billy Dean and Verlon Thompson
- Composer: Gordon Goodwin
- Country of origin: United States
- Original language: English
- No. of seasons: 2
- No. of episodes: 26

Production
- Running time: 23 minutes
- Production companies: King World Productions; Greengrass Productions; Gunther-Wahl Productions (1992) (season 1); Ruby-Spears Enterprises (1993) (season 2); Flextech Television; Mini Mountain Productions

Original release
- Network: ABC
- Release: September 12, 1992 – December 4, 1993

Wild West C.O.W.-Boys of Moo Mesa is a 1992 American animated television series created by comic book artist Ryan Brown, known for his work on Teenage Mutant Ninja Turtles. It aired as part of ABC's Saturday morning lineup.

It was produced by Greengrass Productions in association with King World Productions, and was animated by Gunther-Wahl Productions for its first season and Ruby-Spears Enterprises for its second. At the time of launch, it was the second animated series involving King World Productions to be broadcast (the other was the animated spin-off of The Little Rascals, which aired on ABC from 1982 to 1984).

First broadcast on September 12, 1992, the show ran for two seasons of thirteen episodes each.

== Plot ==
Wild West C.O.W.-Boys of Moo Mesa dealt with a mutation of some kind; an irradiated comet struck the late 19th century Western plains creating a miles high mesa shrouded in clouds. Everything trapped on top of the mesa was "cow-metized" by the light from the "cow-met" and "evolved" into a "bovipomorphic" state. Inspired by old tales of the Wild West, this new bovine community developed to the point where they emulated that era's way of life, including the requisite ruffians and corrupt sheriffs. Their knowledge of Wild West living was limited, however, and as such, many things about their culture had to be improvised to 'fill in the blanks'. The concepts of steampunk and Weird West were utilized throughout its run.

The series focuses on trying to keep justice in the frontier territory. The lawbreakers were too much for the corrupt regulators of Cowtown (namely Mayor Oscar Bulloney and Sheriff Terrorbull) to handle by themselves. Helping them out, whether they wanted it or not, were a group of peacekeepers known as C.O.W.-Boys (the C.O.W. part is short for "Code of the West") led by Marshal Moo Montana and joined by the Dakota Dude and the Cowlorado Kid. Marshal Moo Montana and his deputies had their hands full with several ruffians and outlaw gangs that plagued the otherwise peaceful town.

== Characters ==
=== C.O.W.-Boys ===
- Marshal Moo Montana (voiced by Pat Fraley) is the leader of the C.O.W.-Boys and the marshal of Moo Mesa. Courageous and quick on his hooves, Moo "battles the bad guys and makes the West a safer place to graze". Lives by the Code of the West, which he seems to make up as he goes along (as seen in the episode "The Big Cow Wow"). He has a gun that shoots star-badges and rides a horse named "Cyclone".
- Dakota Dude (voiced by Jim Cummings) is the soft-spoken muscle of Montana's posse, Dakota is calm and level-headed, as he rarely loses his temper, even in near-death experiences (as seen in "Dances with Bulls") and is scared of heights. Dakota agreed to marry Cowlamity Kate in Wedding Bull Blues to save her father's inheritance. Dakota's horse's name is "Rebel".
- Cowlorado Kid (voiced by Jeff Bennett) is a Holstein cattle bull who is the youngest of the group and a self-proclaimed ladies' man with a good singing voice, regardless of his skill with the lasso and guitar.

=== Supporting ===
- Lily Bovine (voiced by Charity James) is a bartender, former showgirl, and the owner of the local saloon called The Tumbleweed where the C.O.W.-Boys go for Sarsaparilla. Lily is Moo Montana's love interest. Her best friend is Cowlamity Kate.
- Cody Calf (voiced by Troy Davidson as a child, Rob Paulsen as an adult in "Skull Duggery Rides Again") is a calf who idolizes Moo Montana and hopes to be a lawcow himself when he grows up. Although well-meaning, he often gets himself into serious trouble trying to "help" the lawcows, but has been a useful asset on several occasions.
- Cowlamity Kate Cudster (voiced by Kay Lenz) is a tomboyish rancher and operator of the highly profitable Golden Cud Mine. She is as hardworking and hard-riding as any bull, and has enough skill with a lasso to put Cowlorado to shame.
- Puma (voiced by Bill Farmer) is a white-bearded cougar and resident of Cowtown who is the resident shoeshiner.
- José "J.R." Rey (voiced by Michael Horse) is a Native American bison who occasionally aids Moo, Dakota and Cowlorado if the situation needs it. He tends to ramble about the scientific principles of his inventions which the C.O.W.-Boys do not want to listen to and would be asked to show them how it works.
  - Tewah (voiced by Charity James) is an Indian bison in J.R.'s tribe. She is J.R.'s niece and is friends with Cody Calf.
- Buffalo Bull (voiced by Jeff Bennett) is a bison who works as Cowtown's blacksmith. In the video game, he is a member of the C.O.W.-Boys. His name is a play on Buffalo Bill.
- Jack (voiced by Jim Cummings) is a rabbit who works as a telegraph operator at Cowtown.
- Gordon Boredon (voiced by Jim Cummings) is a prison warden who runs the prison containing the prisoners that the C.O.W.-Boys apprehend.

=== Antagonists ===
- Mayor Oscar Bulloney (voiced by Michael Greer) is the greedy and corrupt mayor of Cowtown in Moo Mesa and one of the main antagonists of the series. Bulloney rigs elections (as seen in "Stolen on the River") and makes taxes so high that the Masked Bull compares it to stealing. He also serves as Cowtown's crooked justice of the peace and bank president.
- Sheriff Terrorbull (voiced by Joe Piscopo) is a hunched over red-furred cattle and one of the main antagonists of the series who received this position from Mayor Bulloney. Terrorbull uses his sheriff's badge to conceal his evil intentions. When committing crimes, he disguises himself as the "Masked Bull" where he sports a different posture. Terrorbull was forced to leave Cowtown after losing a bet to Moo in "No Face to Hide" to see who can catch Shock Holiday and became sheriff of the remote town of Lonesome Gulch as Bulloney tells him to put up with it until he can think of a way to get him back into Cowtown. At Lonesome Gulch, Terrorbull continued his unlawful exploits whenever Mayor Bulloney is in need of the Masked Bull.
- Saddle Sore Scorpion (voiced by Jim Cummings) is a scorpion and one of the comically inept henchmen of Mayor Bulloney and Sheriff Terrorbull. He is slightly smarter and braver than Boot Hill Buzzard, but only just. His name is taken from saddle sore, a skin ailment caused by horse riding.
- Boot Hill Buzzard (voiced by Danny Mann) is a vulture who is one of the comically inept henchmen of Mayor Bulloney and Sheriff Terrorbull. As the more dimwitted of the two, he is often saddled with more than his fair share of the grunt work, especially if the job involves something embarrassing or unappealing. His name is taken from an old west slang term for a graveyard.
- Barney Finkleberg (voiced by Tim Curry) is a con artist who used the alias of Jacques La Beef. The Masked Bull tried various plots to discredit him. After learning the truth about who Jacques La Beef was, Moo Montana briefly boarded the train Barney was on where he took back the stuff he tried to make off with and advised him never to return to Cowtown.
- Horribull is Sheriff Terrorbull's criminal younger brother whom he breaks out of Sinquitten Federal Prison and has him pose as the Masked Bull to protect his identity after Puma saw the Masked Bull without his mask on.
- Sadie Wowcow (voiced by Michael Greer) is a former show cow who is Lily Bovine's sworn rival. In the past, she always tried to upstage Lily due to jealousy over her popularity.
- Skull Duggery (voiced by Jim Cummings) was originally a mean miner named Tom Duggery who had staked his claim on Skull Mountain. He had struck silver and hid it in a secret chamber within his mine. After he died, Duggery's ghost haunted the mine.
  - Dark Fang is an owl ghost who was recruited to assist Duggery in his revenge on the C.O.W.-Boys.
  - Evil Eye is a black cat ghost who was recruited to assist Duggery in his revenge on the C.O.W.-Boys.
- Five Card Cud (voiced by Robby Benson) is a criminal who conspired to take control of the Dixie Trixie riverboat.
  - Short Change (voiced by Michael Gough) is Five Card Cud's weasel henchman.
- The Gila Hooligans are a gang of gila monsters who crashed Mayor Bulloney's re-election party.
- The Hole in the Ground Gang are a duo of snakes. Their name is a play on the Hole in the Wall Gang.
- Bat Blastagun (voiced by Neil Ross) is a bat outlaw. His name is a play on Bat Masterson.
  - Gil A. Monster is a gila monster who is a part of Bat Blastagun's gang.
  - Rawhide is a rattlesnake member of Bat Blastagun's gang who is often seen being carried by Gil A. Monster.
  - Sid Arachnid is a tarantula who is part of Bat Blastagun's gang. He wields a gun that shoots webs.
  - Dr. Wolfgang Wolfenstein is a wolf hermit/mad scientist who Bat Blastagun enlisted to weaponize the shard of the comet that created Moo Mesa.
- Shock Holliday (voiced by Michael Bell) is a bison outlaw and the leader of his gang who captured all the trains while demanding a ransom from the Railway President. He wields dual lightning bolt shooting electric guns. His name is a play on Doc Holliday.
  - Raw Beans (voiced by Bill Farmer) is a red wolf outlaw, member of Shock Holliday's gang, and possibly his second-in-command who wields a gun that shoots beans scattershot-style. His name is a play on Roy Bean.
  - The Boar Brothers are a couple of wild boar outlaws and members of Shock Holliday's gang. They wield clubs in battle.
  - Slick Willy Weasel (voiced by Jeff Bennett) is a weasel who is member of Shock Holliday's gang. He drives their carriage.
- Cow Belle (voiced by Ruth Buzzi) is a female outlaw. She and her three sons used Sidewinder City as a refuge for outlaws everywhere in exchange for a share of their heist. Her name is a play on Belle Starr.
  - Butch Cowsidy (voiced by Pat Fraley) is Cow Belle's eldest, but shortest son with a broken horn. His name is a play on Butch Cassidy.
  - Lone Grunger is Cow Belle's middle son who dresses in a suit. His name is a play on the Lone Ranger.
  - Sundazed Kid (voiced by Jeff Bennett) is Cow Belle's youngest, but tallest son who is the strongest of her sons. His name is a play on the Sundance Kid.
- Longhorn Silver (voiced by Brad Garrett) is a longhorn pirate captain with a hook for a left hand who leads his pirate crew in causing trouble on Moo Mesa's waterways. His name is a play on Long John Silver.
- Cacklin' Kid (voiced by Rob Paulsen) is a small coyote and known outlaw who the C.O.W.-Boys apprehend while he was being targeted by the Bayin' Bunch, whom he once rode with.
- The Bayin' Bunch are a gang of coyotes who target the Cacklin' Kid who hid their loot in a graveyard and will do anything to get it back from him.
  - Scavenger (voiced by Mark Hamill) is a coyote who sports a Fu Manchu moustache and the leader of the Bayin' Bunch.
  - Buzz is a tan-furred coyote and a member of the Bayin' Bunch.
  - Chomp is an overweight coyote and a member o the Bayin' Bunch.
- Billy the Kidder (voiced by Charlie Adler) is a goat criminal who targeted the lost treasure of the Concudsadors. His name is a play on Billy the Kid.
  - Lester (voiced by Charlie Adler) is one of Billy the Kidder's lizard henchmen.
  - Kisser is one of Billy the Kidder's lizard henchmen.
- The Great Bovini (voiced by Dorian Harewood) is a ringmaster who uses a special stone called the Cowinoor Diamond to mesmerize people. As Boot Hill Buzzard was unaffected by the Cowinoor Diamond while Mayor Bulloney and Saddle Sore were, he and the C.O.W.-Boys had to work together to defeat the Great Bovini and free everyone from the mind-control.
- The Marauders are an all-female gang that pretended to be farmers while stealing a gold mint.
- Barb Wire Babs (voiced by Kate Mulgrew) is a cougar and the leader of the Marauders. She uses a metal claw shooting grapnel gun.
  - The Cow Twins are two unnamed muscular cows and member of the Marauders.
  - The Antelope Lady is an unnamed female antelope and member of the Marauders.
- Rooster Cogsbull (voiced by Michael Bell) is a wagon master and gold thief who masquerades as a creature known as the "Cowgoyle" (a cow-type gargoyle). His name is a play on Rooster Cogburn.
- Big Bucks is a deer claim-jumper who targeted the recently discovered gold.
  - Digalong is a mole and one of Big Bucks' henchman.
  - Stub is a donkey and one of Big Bucks' henchman.
- Fast Willy is a dog criminal who plotted to steal Cowleen's horse Tornado as part of a bigger plot to rob the Pony Express.
- Mules Verne is a mule who plotted to steal the Dixie Trixie where the Invention Convention is so that he can force the inventors on board to build a giant robot cowboy as part of his plot to take over Moo Mesa. His name is a play on Jules Verne.

== Episode guide ==
Several of these episodes or episode titles are parodies of popular Western films or books.

=== Season 1 (1992) ===
No. in season	Title	Written by	Original release date
1	"Bang'em High"	Bob Carrau	September 12, 1992
Mayor Bulloney and The Masked Bull make a plan to get rid of Moo Montana with literally explosive results.
2	"A Snake in Cow's Clothing"	Cliff Ruby; Elana Lesser	September 19, 1992
A mysterious bull named Jacques La Beef arrives in town who has all the women drawn to him. Moo and Dakota are suspicious of him, especially after Miss Lily is robbed of the items in her new safe by The Masked Bull in a plot to discredit Jacques La Beef (who is secretly a notorious con artist named Barney Finkleberg).
3	"Bulls of a Feather"	Cliff Ruby; Elana Lesser	September 26, 1992
During an attack on the stagecoach bound for Cow Town, Puma sees that The Masked Bull is actually Sheriff Terrorbull after Boothill Buzzard accidentally unmasks him. In order to save his identity after his attempt on Puma's life is thwarted by J.R., Sheriff Terrorbull must break his younger brother Horribull out of Sinquitten Federal Prison to pose as The Masked Bull and fool everyone.
4	"School Days"	Ted Pedersen; Francis Moss	October 3, 1992
A new teacher (actually Boot Hill Buzzard in drag) has the children help The Masked Bull commit crime through her strange assignments.
5	"A Sheepful of Dollars"	Bob Carrau	October 10, 1992
Cowlorado volunteers for Miss Lily's cattle drive only to find out his "cattle" is actually a bad tempered sheep named Miss Ewebaby. Moo and Dakota discovery that the cattle drive is a front to delivery the money for the Elbow's Bend Hospital Veterinary Clinic where it is under Miss Ewebaby to keep it from being stolen by The Masked Bull.
6	"Thoroughly Moodern Lily"	Gary Greenfield	October 17, 1992
When Mayor Bulloney discovers oil that is secretly buried deep beneath Lily Bovine's Tumbleweed Saloon, he quickly dispatches Lily's arch-rival Sadie Wowcow to run her out of town.
7	"Wetward, Whoa"	Cliff Roberts	October 24, 1992
Cowtown dries up and only Mayor Bulloney has water. When Cody finds the real reason for this, it is up to him to bring water back to everyone.
8	"Wedding Bull Blues"	Jack Enyart	November 7, 1992
When Cowlamity Kate does not receive a letter from her father who has been exploring the Mesa for seven years, Mayor Bulloney claims he will be taking all her property since her father had no will. When a page of one of her father's old letters shows up, stating Kate will inherit the ranch and his gold, though only if she is married, Kate plans to make Dakota her husband.
9	"Legend of Skull Duggery"	Marilyn Webber	October 31, 1992
When Cody, Carly, and Jake find a treasure map in Cowlamity Kate's attic while cleaning it, they decide to follow it to find Tom Duggery's lost silver on Skull Mountain. While competing against Saddle Sore and Boot Hill Buzzard, Cody, Carly, and Jake encounter Tom Duggery's ghost in the form of Skull Duggery. Moo, Dakota, Cowlorado, and Cowlamity Kate must rescue the kids from Skull Duggery.
10	"Stolen on the River"	Bob Carrau	November 14, 1992
In an attempt to get his own deputy star, Cowlorado goes undercover as Johnny Slim to catch Five Card Cud all by himself when he and his henchman Short Change take control of the Dixie Trixie river boat while in collaboration with the Dixie Trixie's captain.
11	"Dances with Bulls"	Mike & David Benavente	November 21, 1992
Moo Montana and Sheriff Terrorbull get in a mess when they both try to capture the Gila Hooligans after the crashed the party in Cowtown that followed Mayor Bulloney's re-election. To catch the Gila Hooligans, the C.O.W.-Boys and Sheriff Terrorbull have to work together to apprehend the Gilla Hooligans.
12	"The Big Cow Wow"	Bob Carrau	November 28, 1992
The C.O.W.-Boys work to catch two snakes that make up the Hole in the Ground Gang after they robbed some bison at Mini Soda Flats. Cody is really excited about going to the Pueblo's annual Cow-Wow with J.R. and Tejua as the threat of the Hole in the Ground Gang could disrupt the whole fiesta. When Moo and the other C.O.W.-Boys run into some trouble trying to catch the gang, Cody and Tejua help to bring them to justice.
13	"Another Fine Mesa"	Cliff Ruby; Elana Lesser	December 5, 1992
No one cares that it is Moo Montana's tenth anniversary as marshal. Then, Moo receives a telegram from Bessy Bluebell from his hometown of Miller Glen where the retiring sheriff T-Bone wants Moo to take over even at the time when Bat Blastagun and his henchmen are causing trouble in Miller Glen. Moo must decide between Miller Glen, where he is beloved by the townsfolk, and Cowtown.

=== Season 2 (1993) ===
No. in season	Title	Written by	Original release date
14	"No Face To Hide"	Tony Marino	September 11, 1993
Many trains have been stolen by Shock Holiday's gang where Shock Holiday is holding them hostage until the Railroad President pays a huge ransom. When Marshall Moo fails at capturing the thief, Sheriff Terrorbull challenges him to see who catches Shock Holiday first and the loser will have to leave Cowtown.
15	"The Down Under Gang"	Buzz Dixon	September 18, 1993
Cow Belle and her sons Butch Cowsidy, Lone Grunger, and Sundazed Kid have an underground hideout called Sidewinder City which allows other outlaws to use it in exchange of a share of what they steal. When Cowlorado Kid is captured during the infiltration, Moo Montana and Dakota Dude must find Sidewinder City and rescue him while also dealing with the Masked Bull.
16	"Cow Pirates of Swampy Cove"	Mark Jones	September 25, 1993
The pirate captain Longhorn Silver and his band of buccaneers have been robbing trains and causing trouble on Moo Mesa's waterways. With a gold shipment and Cody's money for new boots in their possession, Moo Montana, Dakota Dude, and Cowlorado Kid have to go to Newportleans to track these pirates down. While trying to get back the money, Cody is caught by the Masked Bull as part of his plan to work with Longhorn Silver to dispose of the C.O.W.-Boys. The C.O.W.-Boys must rescue Cody, reclaim the stolen loot, and defeat Longhorn Silver.
17	"The Cacklin Kid"	Mark Jones	October 2, 1993
Moo Montana, Dakota Dude, and Cowlorado Kid apprehend the Cacklin Kid after he was nearly disposed of by the Baying Bunch led by Scavenger who are seeking the location of where the Cacklin Kid hid the Baying Bunch's loot. At the courthouse, Cacklin Kid gets sympathy from Judge Overrule who instructs that Moo Montana, Dakota Dude, and Cowlorado Kid to safely transports Cacklin Kid to the federal penitentiary to serve out his one year sentence. The C.O.W.-Boys must get the Cacklin Kid to the penitentiary safely while evading the Baying Bunch who have gone to Lonesome Gulch and tricked Sheriff Terrorbull into helping them.
18	"Skull Duggery Rides Again"	Marilyn Webber	October 30, 1993
On Halloween, Skull Duggery returns upon emerging from the cave-in of his mine at Skull Mountain in order to get revenge on Moo, Dakota, and Cowlorado. This time, he has obtained an age accelerating spell with the help of his fellow ghosts where they start aging everything in Cowtown.
19	"Billy the Kidder"	Mark Jones	October 9, 1993
The C.O.W.-Boys get word from Warden Gordon Bordon that Billy the Kidder and his lizard henchmen Lester and Kisser have escaped from prison. When Lily's uncle Rocky gets caught in a cave-in upon finding the lost treasure of the Concudsadors, she plans to enlist Cowlamity Kate to help rescue him only to end up captured by Lester and Kisser so that Billy the Kidder can steal the lost treasure of the Concudsadors. The C.O.W.-Boys and Calamity Kate must rescue Lily and Rocky, apprehend Billy the Kidder's group, and recover the lost treasure of the Concudsadors.
20	"How the West was Shrunk"	Mark Jones	October 16, 1993
Bat Blastagun and his gang have escaped from prison where they find a shard of the comet that created Moo Mesa outside of Cowtown. Enlisting the help of the mad scientist Dr. Wolfgang Wolfenstein, Bat Masterson uses the shard to shrink everything.
21	"Circus Daze"	Tony Marino	October 23, 1993
The Great Bovini's Wild West Circus comes to Cowtown, but amusement of the masses is the last thing on the mind of the ringmaster The Great Bovini as he uses a special stone to mesmerize anyone into stealing money. In order to keep the Cowinoor Diamond from being shipped to the Jersey City Museum, Mayor Bulloney, Saddle Sore, and Boot Hill Buzzard approach The Great Bovini to help them steal it which does not go well as Boot Hill Buzzard is unaffected by The Great Bovini's stone. The C.O.W.-Boys must work with Boot Hill Buzzard into thwarting The Great Bovini and freeing the townspeople from his control.
22	"No Way to Treat a Lady"	David Benavente & Michael J. Benavente	November 6, 1993
Moo Montana, Dakota Dude, and Cowlorado Kid have to deal with four masked marauders that are on a crime spree who happen to be ladies of the Sewing B. Ranch led by Barb Wire Babs (the criminal alias of Miss Barbara). As Cowlorado Kid goes undercover in Barbed Wire Babs' group, Wild Bill Barker is kidnapped as part of Barbed Wire Babs' plot to make counterfeit money.
23	"Night of the Cowgoyle"	Marilyn Webber	November 13, 1993
After Cowlorado Kid was unable to catch a gold thief, he, Moo Montana, and Dakota Dude look for the thief and end up escorting a wagon train led by Rooster Cogsbull through a valley where a creature called the Cowgoyle (a cattle/gargoyle creature) dwells. To make sure that the C.O.W.-Boys meet their end and the Cowgoyle is blamed for the action, Mayor Bulloney sends Saddle Sore and Boot Hill Buzzard to get the Masked Bull to dispose of them. Following the Cowgoyle's attacks, the C.O.W.-Boys work to catch the Cowgoyle while suspecting that it might be one of the suspicious wagon train travelers.
24	"Boom Town or Bust"	Rich Fogel & Mark Seidenberg	November 20, 1993
Cowlorado Kid discovers gold in a river causing the Gold Rush on Moo Mesa which even gets Mayor Bulloney, Saddle Sore, and Boot Hill Buzzard to work on claiming the gold. Upon Boom Town being formed as part of the gold rush, the C.O.W.-Boys work to keep the settlement in line. When a claim-jumper named Big Bucks and his henchmen Digalong and Stub plot to steal everyone's gold, the C.O.W.-Boys spring into action to protect Boom Town.
25	"The Fastest Filly in the West"	Rich Fogel & Mark Seidenberg	November 27, 1993
In preparation for the 11th Annual Cowtown Cross Country Race, Cowlorado Kid encounters some competition Cowlamity Kate's cousin Cowleen and her horse Tornado as well as encountering his old rival Swifty Buckhorn. Fast Willy and his henchmen plan to steal Tornado so that they can rob the Pony Express with one of the packages being the trophy for the Cross Country Race. Cowlorado Kid and Swifty Buckhorn must put aside their differences to help Moo and Dakota catch Fast Willy and reclaim Tornado.
26	"The Wild Wild Pest"	Mark Jones	December 4, 1993
J.R. takes Cody Calf and Buffalo Bull to the Invention Convention on the Dixie Trixie. Using his airship, Mules Verne and his henchmen steal the Dixie Trixie so that he can force all the inventors onboard to help him take over Moo Mesa by building a giant robot cowboy that will help in his plans by starting with raiding the governor's mansion.

== Cast ==
- Jeff Bennett as Cowlorado Kid, Hole in the Ground Gang Leader (in "The Big Cow Wow"), Frank (in "Another Fine Mesa"), Beans (in "Another Fine Mesa"), Slick Willy Weasel (in "No Face to Hide"), Sundazed Kid (in "The Down Under Gang")
- Jim Cummings as The Dakota Dude, Jack, Saddle Sore, Warden Gordon Borden, Wild Bill Barker, Skull Duggery (in "Legend of Skull Duggery," "Skull Duggery Rides Again"), Gila Hooligans Leader (in "Dances with Bulls"), Toupee Turkey (in "The Big Cow Wow"), Bank Robber (in "The Down Under Gang"), Wild Bill Barker (in "No Way to Treat a Lady") Grits (in "Night of the Cowgoyle")
- Troy Davidson as Cody Calf
- Bill Farmer as Puma, Raw Beans (in "No Face to Hide"), Jury Foreman (in "The Cacklin' Kid")
- Pat Fraley as Marshal Moo Montana, Butch Cowsidy (in "The Down Under Gang")
- Michael Greer as Mayor Oscar Bulloney, Sadie Wowcow (in "Thoroughly Moodern Lily")
- Michael Horse as José "J.R." Rey
- Charity James as Lily Bovine, Tewah (in "The Big Cow Wow")
- Kay Lenz as Cowlamity Kate
- Danny Mann as Boot Hill Buzzard
- Joe Piscopo as Sheriff Terrorbull

=== Additional voices ===
- Charlie Adler as Billy the Kidder (in "Billy the Kidder"), Lester (in "Billy the Kidder")
- Jack Angel (season 2)
- Michael Bell as Shock Holiday (in "No Face to Hide"), Rooster Cogsbull (in "Night of the Cowgoyle")
- Robby Benson as Five Card Cud (in "Stolen on the River")
- Corey Burton (season 2)
- Ruth Buzzi as Cow Belle (in "The Down Under Gang")
- Jodi Carlisle (season 2)
- Tim Curry as Jacques La Beef/Barney Finkleberg (in "A Snake in Cow's Clothing")
- David Doyle as Rocky Bovine (in "Billy the Kidder")
- Brad Garrett as Longhorn Silver (in "Cow Pirates of Swampy Cove")
- Ellen Gerstell (season 2)
- Michael Gough as Small Change (in "Stolen on the River")
- Mark Hamill as Scavenger (in "The Cacklin Kid")
- Dorian Harewood as The Great Bovini (in "Circus Daze")
- Kate Mulgrew as Barbed Wire Babs/Miss Barbara (in "No Way to Treat a Lady")
- Rob Paulsen as Adult Cody Calf (in "Skull Duggery Rides Again"), Cacklin Kid (in "The Cacklin Kid"), Swifty Buckhorn (in "The Fastest Filly in the West"), Pony Express Worker (in "The Fastest Filly in the West")
- Stu Rosen (season 2)
- Neil Ross as Bat Blastagun (in "Another Fine Mesa" and "How the West was Shrunk")
- Kath Soucie as Carly (in "The Legend of Skull Duggery"), Jake (in "The Legend of Skull Duggery"), Sally Sheep (in "The Legend of Skull Duggery")
- Sally Struthers as Bessy Bluebell ("in "Another Fine Mesa")
- Russi Taylor as Sally Sue Holstein (in "A Sheepful of Dollars"), Miss Ewebaby (in "A Sheepful of Dollars")

== Crew ==
- Ginny McSwain – voice director
- Cary Silver – talent coordinator

== Theme song ==
The theme song was sung by country artist Billy Dean, who co-wrote it with Verlon Thompson.

== Home media ==
Twelve VHS cassettes containing episodes were released:

- Stolen on the River
- A Snake in Cow's Clothing
- School Days
- Another Fine Mesa
- Bang 'Em High
- The Big Cow-Wow
- Bulls of a Feather
- Dances with Bulls
- Legend of Skull Duggery
- A Sheepful of Dollars
- Wedding Bull Blues
- Wetward, Whoa

== Toys ==
A toyline was released by Hasbro with designs reminiscent of Playmates Toys Teenage Mutant Ninja Turtles figures.

== Reboot ==
In 2023, The Nacelle Company purchased the rights to the original series from WildBrain and plans to reboot the property with a new animated series and a new line of action figures and other merchandise. The animated series is scheduled for release in 2027.

== In other media ==
=== Video game ===
A four-player arcade game was also released by Konami in North America and Europe on November 19, 1992. Ryan Brown worked closely with Konami on the game's development. The game is a side-scrolling run-and-gun similar to Konami's previous game, Sunset Riders.

=== Comic book ===
Between December 1992 and February 1993, Archie Comics published a three-issue limited series titled The Wild West C.O.W.-Boys of Moo Mesa, which was written by Brown's long-time collaborator Doug Brammer. This was followed by a regular series which ran for three issues, March–July 1993.
