= Soldier's Creed =

United States Army tradition

2018 U.S. Army poster bearing the current Soldier's Creed.

The Soldier's Creed is a standard by which all United States Army personnel are expected to live. All U.S. Army enlisted soldiers are taught the Soldier's Creed during initial entry training, and recite the creed in public ceremonies at the conclusion of training. Both the Soldier's Creed and the Noncommissioned Officer's Creed are required knowledge at enlisted promotion boards to compete for the rank of sergeant and above, as well as 'Soldier of the Month' boards. It is also common practice to recite the Soldier's Creed at the graduation ceremony from Army ROTC. Unlike the U.S. Uniformed Services Oath of Office or the Oath of Enlistment, the Soldier's Creed is not a legally-binding oath and can be affirmed by both commissioned officers and enlisted soldiers.

== History ==
The original Soldier's Creed dates back to at least World War II, appearing in the Congressional Record on January 15, 1942.

The current version of the Soldier's Creed is a product of the 'Warrior Ethos' program authorized by the then Army Chief of Staff Eric K. Shinseki in May 2003. It was written by members of Task Force Soldier's Warrior Ethos Team, and was first approved in its current format by the next Army Chief of Staff Peter Schoomaker on 13 November 2003. The introduction of the Soldier's Creed kicked off a campaign known as 'Task Force Soldier'. This is a leadership commitment to soldiers ensuring they are prepared for combat and embody the Warrior Ethos contained in the Soldier's Creed. It seems to have been discussed in Congress in a 'Hearing on Army Issues' held by Senator John W. Warner on or about 19 November 2003. It was first published in the magazine Infantry on 22 December 2003. It has been criticized for an emphasis on being a "warrior" over being a "guardian", as was present in the former creed.

Soldiers stand at attention when formally reciting the Soldier's Creed as part of an official ceremony.

== Current version ==
U.S. Soldier's Creed

I am an American Soldier.

I am a Warrior and a member of a team.

I serve the people of the United States, and live the Army Values.

I will always place the mission first.

I will never accept defeat.

I will never quit.

I will never leave a fallen comrade.

I am disciplined, physically and mentally tough, trained and proficient in my warrior tasks and drills.

I always maintain my arms, my equipment and myself.

I am an expert and I am a professional.

I stand ready to deploy, engage, and destroy the enemies of the United States of America, in close combat.

I am a guardian of freedom and the American way of life.

I am an American Soldier.

=== U.S. Army Warrior Ethos ===
The U.S. Army Warrior Ethos has been incorporated into the Soldier's Creed and is italicized in the text above (as is quite common in any print version supplied by the U.S. Army itself).

== Pre-2003 version ==
Pre-2003 Version of U.S. Soldier's Creed

I am an American Soldier. I am a member of the United States Army – a protector of the greatest nation on earth. Because I am proud of the uniform I wear, I will always act in ways creditable to the military service and the nation it is sworn to guard.

I am proud of my own organization. I will do all I can to make it the finest unit in the Army. I will be loyal to those under whom I serve. I will do my full part to carry out orders and instructions given to me or my unit.

As a soldier, I realize that I am a member of a time-honored profession—that I am doing my share to keep alive the principles of freedom for which my country stands. No matter what the situation I am in, I will never do anything, for pleasure, profit, or personal safety, which will disgrace my uniform, my unit, or my country. I will use every means I have, even beyond the line of duty, to restrain my Army comrades from actions disgraceful to themselves and to the uniform.

I am proud of my country and its flag. I will try to make the people of this nation proud of the service I represent, for I am an American Soldier.

== See also ==
- Airman's Creed (U.S. Air Force)
- Code of the U.S. Fighting Force
- Creed of the United States Coast Guardsman (U.S. Coast Guard)
- Infantryman's Creed (U.S. Army, Infantry Branch)
- Noncommissioned officer's creed (U.S. Army)
- Quartermaster Creed (U.S. Army, Quartermaster Corps)
- Ranger Creed (U.S. Army, Rangers)
- Rifleman's Creed (U.S. Marine Corps)
- Sailor's Creed (U.S. Navy)
