= Sunset Riders =

1991 video game

- North American arcade flyer
- Developer: Konami
- Publisher: Konami
- Director: Hideyuki Tsujimoto
- Producers: M. Ozawa; Masahiro Inoue
- Platforms: Arcade, Mega Drive/Genesis, Super NES
- Release: Arcade: NA: October 1991; JP: November 1991; Mega Drive/Genesis: NA: December 1992; EU: April 1993; Super NES: NA: October 1993; EU: November 26, 1993
- Genre: Run and gun
- Modes: Single-player, multiplayer

Sunset Riders (Note: Japanese: サンセットライダーズ, Hepburn: Sansetto Raidāzu) is a 1991 run and gun video game developed and published by Konami for arcades. It was released in North America in October 1991 and Japan in November 1991. It is set in the American Old West, where the player(s) take control of bounty hunters who are seeking the rewards offered for various criminals.

The arcade version was released in two variants: a two-player version and a four-player version. Home console versions of Sunset Riders were released for the Mega Drive/Genesis in 1992 and for the Super Nintendo Entertainment System in 1993 to a positive reception. Hamster Corporation released the game as part of their Arcade Archives series for the Nintendo Switch and PlayStation 4 in June 2020.

== Gameplay ==
Gameplay screenshot showing Steve on the game's third level

The game, which is set in a fanciful version of the American Old West, revolves around four bounty hunters named Steve, Billy, Bob, and Cormano, who are out to claim rewards offered for eliminating the most wanted outlaws in the West. Each bounty hunter wields different guns. At the beginning of each stage, the players are shown a wanted poster for the outlaw they will face at its end.

Sunset Riders has gameplay that is similar to other Konami titles such as Contra and Vendetta. This cooperative shooter can also be played up to two or four players simultaneously, depending on the version of the game. In the two-player version each player can choose which of the four bounty hunters to play as at the start of the game, while in the four-player version each character is assigned to a different control panel. Steve and Billy wield revolvers, Bob carries a rifle, and Cormano uses a double barrel shotgun. The controls consist of an eight-way joystick for moving and aiming, and two buttons for shooting and jumping. The player(s) can jump between higher/lower floors and slide to avoid enemy attacks.

The objective of the game is to defeat a gang of outlaws in eight stages, with a fight against a strong boss character at the end of each. When two or more people are playing, the one who deals the most damage to a stage boss receives the entire bonus for defeating him. Five of the stages are played on foot, two on horseback, and one on a moving train. A bonus minigame is played after the second and fifth stages, in which the player(s) can earn additional points by shooting outlaws as they pop up. After all eight stages are cleared, the game restarts with increased difficulty.

Power-ups and bonus items can be obtained by entering doorways, defeating certain sack-carrying bandits, or opening sacks placed on the ground. Two power-ups are available, a gold sheriff's badge that grants fully automatic fire and a silver one that gives the player a second gun. Both power-ups can be equipped at once. Other weapons that can be used by the player include dynamite carried by female bandits (which must be thrown back before it explodes), hanging rocks/barrels/torches that can be dropped on enemies, and mounted Gatling guns available only in the last stage. An easter egg involves the defeat of the boss in the fifth stage; if Cormano is active at this point, he will catch the boss's sombrero and wear it for the remainder of the game.

One life is lost whenever the player is hit by any enemy attack, trampled by bulls, caught in a fire or explosion, or struck by a rock or obstacle. Any power-ups that a player has gained are also lost. After all lives are lost, the player may continue the game by inserting more credits, but has a limited amount of time to do so before the game defaults to a game over screen.

== Release ==
In Japan, the arcade game was first released on July 9, 1991. Sunset Riders made its North American debut at the September 1991 Amusement & Music Operators Association (AMOA) show in Las Vegas. It was then released for arcades internationally in October 1991. Two years later, the arcade version was reprogrammed to two home consoles. The home versions were only released in North America and Europe.

=== Sega Genesis ===
The Mega Drive/Genesis version of Sunset Riders features the most changes made to the game between the two home versions of the game. Out of the four main characters from the arcade game, only Billy and Cormano are featured. The two characters in the Genesis version were given surnames that they originally did not have in the arcade version (Billy Cool and Cormano Wild). The controls are identical to the arcade version aside from the addition of two shooting buttons instead of just one: one button allows the player to walk and shoot at the same time, while the other shoot button keeps the character still when pressed down, allowing the player to change their aim only.

Only four of the eight bosses from the arcade version are featured (Simon Greedwell, Paco Loco, Chief Scalpem, and Sir Richard Rose), and each of the four chapters are divided into two stages. Each boss dialogue is worded in a text bubble instead of voiced. The power-up icons have also been replaced as well. Unlike the other versions, the player can cause a dynamite stick to explode by shooting it. To access the bonus stages, the player must collect a Star-shaped item located in either stage of each chapter. The bonus stages also differ from the ones in the arcade version: the player chases after a moving wagon on horseback, while the woman in the wagon tosses bonus coins and extra lives at the player's path.

In addition to the standard game mode, the Mega Drive/Genesis version features a two-player versus mode. The players must shoot each other until one of the players runs out of health.

=== Super NES ===
In contrast to the Genesis version, the Super NES version of Sunset Riders features relatively few changes. Subtitles have been added to the voice acted cutscenes, and the barfly that kisses the player character in Stage 1 as well as the saloon dancers from Stage 4 are dressed more conservatively compared to the arcade version. In addition, there is only one woman you can rescue in Stage 4, and you do not get a bonus upon rescuing her. Hunter dogs, which were present in the first segment of the final chapter in the Genesis version, were removed. The Native American enemy characters from Stage 6 were removed and replaced with regular outlaws, leaving only Chief Wigwam (originally named Chief Scalpem in the arcade version) as the stage boss. The dynamite-tossing female bandits were replaced with male bandits as well.

== Reception ==
Contemporary reception

Review scores
Publication	Score		
Publication	Arcade	Sega Genesis	SNES
Electronic Gaming Monthly			39/50
GameFan		187/200	
GamePro		16/20	
HobbyConsolas		78%	86%
Mean Machines Sega		84%	
Sinclair User	82%		
Super Play			87%
Zero	3/5		
MegaTech		87%	
SNES Force			89%

=== Contemporary ===
In Japan, Game Machine listed it on their December 15, 1991 issue as being the third most-successful table arcade unit of the month.

Sunset Riders was well received by the video game press upon release. Sinclair User gave the arcade game an 82% score, opining it "plays very well and should prove an interesting challenge for your finely honed arcade skills." In a more reserved review, Zero rated the arcade original a 3 out of 5, calling it a "fairly fast shoot'em up with a sense of humour."

The "rather splendid" Super NES version was given an overall score of 87% by Dan Jevons from Super Play, who described it as "another winner from Konami's stable". It also received an 89% score in SNES Force, with an 88% and an 89% from two reviewers. Hobby Consolas gave the scores of 86% to the Super NES version and 78% for the Sega Mega Drive version, while Mean Machines Sega rated the latter as 84%, noting it as "surprisingly good".

=== Retrospective ===
Retrospective reception

Aggregate score
Aggregator	Score	
Aggregator	Sega Genesis	SNES
GameRankings	70% (1 review)	80% (6 reviews)

Review scores
Publication	Score	
Publication	Sega Genesis	SNES
Nintendo Life		8/10
Arcade Attack	80%	
Retro Game Age		8/10
Sega-16	7/10	

Retrospectively, Jamie O'Neill from Nintendo Life awarded the Super NES version eight stars out of ten, writing it "is bright, colourful, fantastically well animated, with superb music and sound. It understands its place as a Western game and within the run-and-gun genre, by combining imaginative characterisation and humour, with well-paced action set-pieces, plus variety in its gameplay." Retro Game Age gave it the same score as well, opining "Sunset Riders remains a fun romp that still presents some challenge to get through and is just as fun to play now as it was almost 20 years ago." Nick Gibson from Sega-16 rated the Sega Mega Drive/Genesis port a 7 out of 10, while it was rated 80% by Arcade Attack.

IGN ranked it as the 88th best game for the Super NES. In 2018, Complex listed the game 36th in their "The Best Super Nintendo Games of All Time."

== See also ==
- Mystic Warriors
- Wild West C.O.W.-Boys of Moo Mesa
- List of Western video games
