= Credo (card game) =

1993 strategy card game

The Game Of Dueling Dogmas
- Front cover of original card version
- Designers: Chris Gidlow
- Illustrators: Petra Pino, Sam Shirley, Gahan Wilson
- Publishers: Chaosium
- Publication: 1993
- Genres: Strategy Card Game
- Players: 2-5
- Playing time: 60 minutes (according to the box)
- Chance: card distribution

Credo is a strategy card game for two to five players, designed by Chris V. Gidlow, first published by Chaosium in 1993, and re-released in an updated edition in 2026.

== Description ==
The 1993 edition of the game comes with two decks of cards, two eight-page rule booklets, and four paper display sheets. It is set in the early history of the Christian Church and is based on hypothetical alternatives to how the Nicene Creed, its contents, and what would be seen as heresy might have been decided upon by a series of Ecumenical councils and the influence of the Roman Emperor (particularly Constantine I).

Players use cards to set up their own Articles of Faith and Firm Beliefs, while using other cards to shore up their followers by proselytizing, and by persecuting their fellow players.

Chaosium released a new edition of the game, with updated artwork and rules, in September 2026.

=== Victory ===
In the 1993 edition, the first player to either gain 11 million followers or gain 117 votes on the Council wins the game.

== Reception ==
In the June 1994 edition of Dragon (Issue 206), Rick Swan thought it was too expensive ($15), but still playable, saying, "Considering the meager components, this is way overpriced. But there’s no denying the play value. Heavenly!"
