= Credo (Pärt) =

1968 musical composition by Arvo Pärt

"Credo" is a 1968 musical piece by Estonian composer Arvo Pärt. Its text is in Latin.

The length of "Credo" is 12 min. The premiere was on 16 November 1968 in Tallinn. The piece employs elements of dodecaphony, sonorism, collage and aleatoric music. It has been called Pärt's "farewell to twelve-tone music". The performance of "Credo" was banned in the Soviet Union shortly after its premiere.
