= Creed (surname) =

Creed is an English surname. At the time of the British Census of 1881, its frequency was highest in Somerset (7.4 times the British average), followed by Gloucestershire, Dorset, Kent, Oxfordshire, Norfolk, Warwickshire, London, Buckinghamshire and Wiltshire.

Notable people with the surname include:

- Barbara Creed, cultural critic
- Brutus Creed, ring name of professional wrestler Jacob Kasper
- Consequences Creed (born 1986), early ring persona of American professional wrestler Austin Watson, now better known as Xavier Woods
- Dick Creed (1931–2024), American football on-field official
- Frederick G. Creed (1871–1957), Canadian inventor
- Helios Creed, American musician, guitarist of Chrome
- James Creed, MP for Canterbury
- John Creed (politician) (1842–1930), Australian politician
- John Creed (soldier) (1819–1872), Irish-American soldier
- Julius Creed, ring name of professional wrestler Drew Kasper
- Linda Creed (1949–1986), American songwriter
- Martin Creed (born 1968), English artist
- Michael Creed (born 1963), Irish politician
- Percy Redfern Creed, Irish author
- Sheldon Creed (born 1997), racing driver

== Fictional characters ==
- Adonis Creed, a boxer in the Rocky spin-off and sequel Creed
- Apollo Creed, a boxer in the Rocky films
- Graydon Creed, a Marvel Comics villain
- Louis Creed, the protagonist of the Stephen King novel Pet Sematary
- Victor Creed, a.k.a. Sabretooth, a Marvel Comics character

== See also ==
- Charlie Creed-Miles (born 1972), British actor
