= Creed Haymond =

American athlete

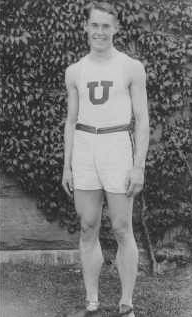

Personal information
- Born: Walter Creed Haymond; December 2, 1893
- Died: March 1983

Sport
- Country: United States
- Sport: Track and field / Athletics
- Events: Sprinter (injured, did not run)
- Club: University of Utah and University of Pennsylvania
Medal record
Representing the United States
Olympic Games

Walter Creed Haymond (December 2, 1893 – March 1983) was an American track and field athlete.

== Biography ==
Haymond was raised in Springville, Utah.

Haymond attended the University of Utah where he lettered three times and was the captain of the track team. Haymond later studied dentistry at the University of Pennsylvania, where he again became the captain of the track team. At the 1919 Inter-Collegiate Association Track and Field (Outdoor) Meet, he broke the world record time for the 220-yard race (now known as the 200-meter dash), just minutes after missing the world record by one-tenth of a second in the qualifying heat for the finals and before he was given a chance to catch his breath. The same day he won the 100-yard dash against what he called "the six fastest men in America" after his starting hole collapsed and he started four or five yards behind in the race.

Haymond was accepted to compete as a sprinter for Team USA at the 1920 Summer Olympics, in Antwerp, Belgium, but he was injured before the competition.

Haymond served as a mission president for the Church of Jesus Christ of Latter-day Saints (LDS Church) in the Northern States Mission headquartered in Chicago, Illinois, 1945-1950. (Their mission reunion group was honored a few years ago in the Church News for having the longest continuous reunions of any mission in the church).

Haymond became an Honoree (inducted into) the Utah Sports Hall of Fame in 1971.

== In popular culture ==
Haymond is occasionally cited by leaders of the LDS Church as an example of the benefits that can result from abiding by the Word of Wisdom, a health code for members of church.
