= Keith Alan Morris =

American director, producer (b. 1972)

Writer/director Keith Alan Morris

Keith Alan Morris (born October 9, 1972, in South Bend, Indiana) is an American writer/film director and producer. His most notable films include Gutter King, Flying Tiger, and The Clinic, all of which screened at the Cannes Film Fest Market. He wrote and directed the documentary R.U.B.s in the Guggenheim Museum's "Art of the Motorcycle" exhibit.

== Early life ==
Morris was born in South Bend, Indiana, the son of Ronald and Susan Morris. He grew up there, where he attended Adams High School and also Niles First Assembly High School in Niles, Michigan, where he was salutatorian. He won a scholarship to Kalamazoo College to study political science and theater communications, earning a B.A. with Honors in 1994. While there he made short films and two feature films, The Outside Man and The in Crowd, which won him the Cooper Award and Schneider Prize before graduating in 1994. He attended Instituto Internacional, Madrid, Spain (1993) and University of Central Florida – MFA, Entrepreneurial Digital Cinema Track.

== Career ==
Morris' first feature, The Clinic won Best Screenplay for a Feature Film (out of 180 films) at the New York International Independent Film Fest, and received representation at the Cannes Film Fest Market.

Flying Tiger screened at the Cannes Film Festival Market and won Best Feature at the Arizona Film and TV Fest in 2008. It was shot in Stockton, Missouri, with a student crew from Indiana (where he trained the students for one year prior). Flying Tiger is about a senior in high school who can fly.

=== Gutter King ===
Gutter King was his first breakthrough feature internationally. It was nominated for 3 awards in 2010. It has been compared to the early films of Martin Scorsese in that "the violence is dealt with extreme care and respect, as opposed to the superficiality with which we are used to seeing from directors like Guy Ritchie, Danny Boyle or David Fincher."

After Gutter King, reached 3.2 million torrents, he was asked to instigate a lawsuit against end users and The Pirate Bay to cut down on unauthorized and illegal downloading of media but steadfastly declined and did not pursue any legal action.

=== Other work ===
Morris has written numerous unproduced scripts. Sample approved artwork for one is available on an unofficial Keith Alan Morris website of his films, ufo-tech.com.

He produced two films in 2015 and was production consultant on 10 others, including The Magnificent Seven remake.

== Themes and style ==
Although Morris' films differ considerably in setting and characters (Gutter King is about a suburban teenager, his next film is a robot epic), they share similar themes of existentialism, violence, and spirituality.

Morris' style is composed of handheld based tracking shots and camera movement in general, and he uses his scenes to convey ideas with images, rather than with dialogue. One Latin audience reviewer likened him to Martin Scorsese because of his foreboding, ominous style and his approach to violence comes from a prudent and responsible perspective of trying to understand the characters and the motives for their behavior. Music also plays a large role in Morris' films and he works closely with Michael Kauffmann and the Asthmatic Kitty label and Jeb Banner of Musical Family Tree, both located in his birth state of Indiana.

== Films ==
- The Clinic (2001) – Won Best Screenplay for a Feature Film at the New York International Independent Film and Video Festival.
- Flying Tiger (2004) – Best Feature Film at the Arizona Film and Television Festival, 2008
- R.U.B.s (2006)
- Otis Gibbs LIVE (2009)
- Gutter King (2010) distributed by Cinema Epoch, Multivisionnaire, Metrodome, Rialto, Lizard, Front Row (United States, China, United Kingdom, Australia, Russia, Middle East, Malaysia); Nominations at the Action On Film Fest 2010: Best Picture, Best Breakout Action Star, Best Supporting Actor

== Artwork ==
- Illustrator of over 60 album covers
- Written and illustrated numerous comics and graphic novels
- Won the NACE award for Excellence in Advertising
