= Covenant (short story) =

- Short story by Elizabeth Bear
- Country: United States
- Language: English
- Genre(s): Science fiction

Publication
- Published in: Hieroglyph: Stories and Visions for a Better Future
- Publication type: Anthology
- Publisher: William Morrow
- Media type: Print (short story)
- Publication date: September 9, 2014
- Pages: 15

"Covenant" is a 2014 science fiction short story by Elizabeth Bear. It was first published in the anthology Hieroglyph.

== Synopsis ==
A former serial killer — the beneficiary of "rightminding", a process that cures psychopathy by forcibly bestowing empathy — finds herself in a very dangerous situation.

== Reception ==
"Covenant" was a finalist for the 2015 Locus Award for Best Short Story. SF Signal considered it to be 'suspenseful' and 'fairly riveting', with '(a)n interesting premise'. Daniel Keys Moran stated that the story made him "wish [he] were a member of SFWA, so [he] could vote [for it] on the Nebulas."
