= Covenant =

Covenant may refer to:

== Religion ==
- Covenant (religion), a formal alliance or agreement made by God with a religious community or with humanity in general
  - Covenant (biblical), in the Hebrew Bible
  - Covenant in Mormonism, a sacred agreement between God and a person or group of people
  - Covenant of allegiance in Ahmadiyya Islam, which requires followers to fulfill the Ten Conditions of Bai'at
  - Covenant of Bahá'u'lláh, in the Bahá'í faith, two separate binding agreements between God and man
    - Greater Covenant, the covenant made between each Manifestation from God and his followers regarding the coming of the next Manifestation from God
    - Lesser Covenant, regarding the successorship of authority within the religion
  - Covenant theology, in Christianity interpretations of a covenant surrounding Jesus's death and resurrection
  - Mosaic covenant, a biblical covenant between God and the biblical Israelites, including their proselytes.
  - New Covenant theology, a Christian theological position teaching that the Old Testament laws have been abrogated or cancelled with Jesus' crucifixion, and replaced with the Law of Christ of the New Covenant
  - New Covenant, a biblical interpretation often thought of as an eschatological Messianic Age or world to come and is related to the biblical concept of the Kingdom of God
  - Solemn League and Covenant, an agreement between the Scottish Covenanters and the leaders of the English Parliamentarians in 1643 during the First English Civil War
- Covenant of the Goddess, a cross-traditional Wiccan group
- Church covenant, a promise made by members to each other within a Christian church

== Politics ==
'Covenant' is, in politics, used as near-equivalent of the term 'charter'; perhaps the most famous example is the Covenant of the League of Nations.

== Law ==
- Covenant (law), a promise to engage in or refrain from a specified action (including restrictive covenant, a restriction on the use of property)
- Covenant marriage, a marriage contract that does not allow for no-fault divorce
- Loan covenant

== Film and television ==
=== Film ===
- The Covenant (1985 film), an American television horror film
- The Covenant (2006 film), an American supernatural horror film
- Alien: Covenant, a 2017 film by Ridley Scott; the second prequel in the Alien franchise
- Guy Ritchie's The Covenant, a 2023 action-thriller film

=== Television ===
- The Covenant (Alias), a fictional organization in the series Alias
- "Covenant" (Millennium), a 1997 episode
- "Covenant" (Smallville), a 2004 episode
- "Covenant" (Star Trek: Deep Space Nine), a 1998 episode
- "Covenant" (Stargate SG-1), a 2004 episode
- "The Covenant" (Homeland), a 2017 episode
- "The Covenant" (Walker, Texas Ranger), a 1995 episode

== Fiction ==
- Covenant (short story), a short story by Elizabeth Bear
- Covenant (World of Darkness), in the fictional World of Darkness universe
- The Covenant (novel), a novel by James Michener set in South Africa
- Thomas Covenant the Unbeliever, the protagonist and title character of a series of fantasy novels by Stephen R. Donaldson

== Music ==
- Covenant (band), a Swedish band
- Covenant, former name of the Norwegian band The Kovenant
- Covenant (Greg Brown album)
- Covenant (Morbid Angel album), the third album by death metal band Morbid Angel
- Covenant (UFO album), the 16th album by heavy metal band UFO

== Video games ==
- Covenant (Halo), a religious alliance of alien races in the Halo video game series
- Shadow Hearts: Covenant, console role-playing game developed by Nautilus and published by Midway in 2004
- Daggerfall Covenant, a faction in MMORPG The Elder Scrolls Online
- The Covenant, a 1985 video game by PSS software
- Covenant, the name of a Settlement in Fallout 4

== Other ==
- The Armed Forces Covenant or Military Covenant, terms used in the United Kingdom referring to the mutual obligations of the general public and the British Armed Forces.
- Covenants (Ars Magica), a supplement published for the role-playing game Ars Magica
