= Rifleman's Creed =

Basic United States Marine Corps doctrine

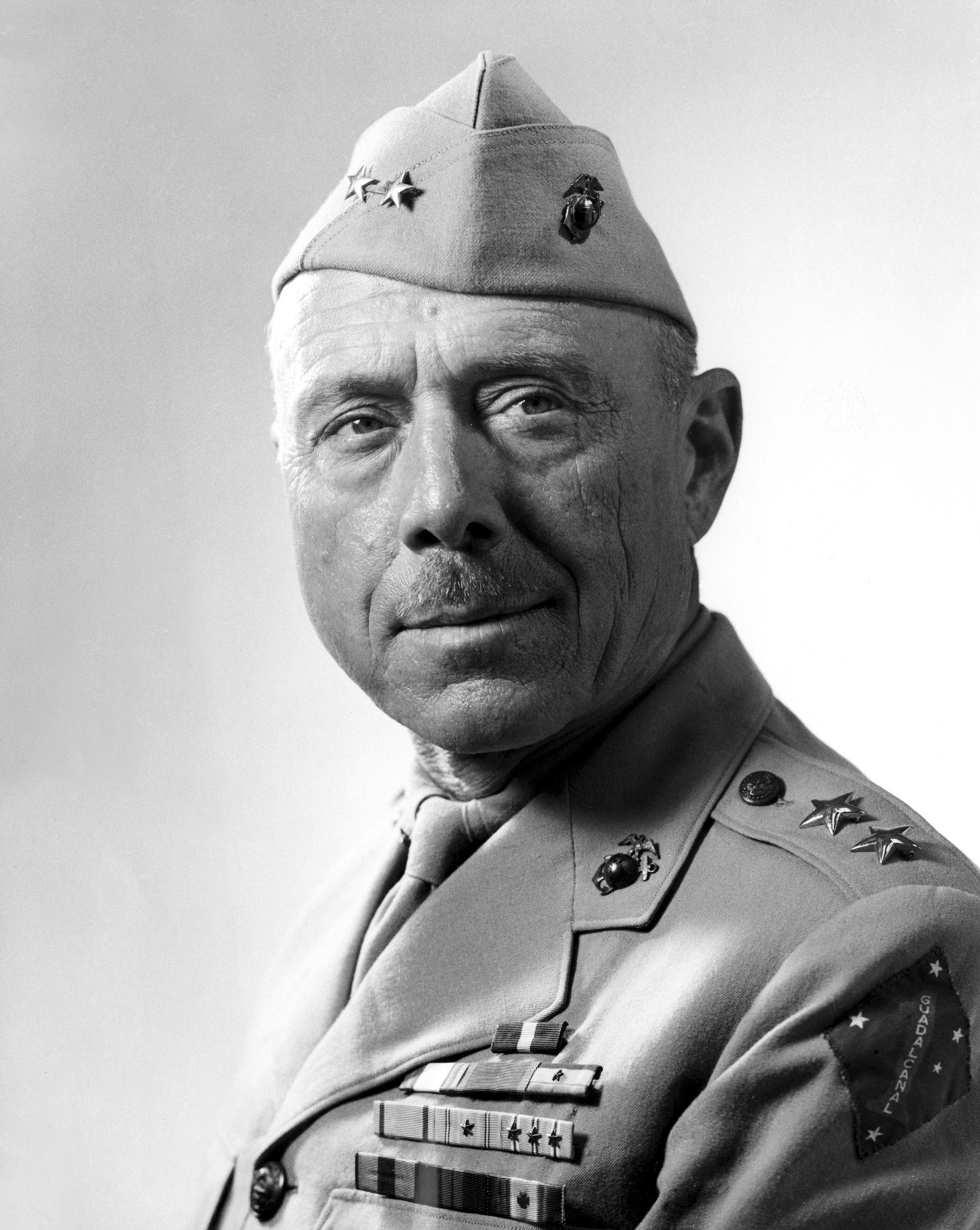
MajGen. William H. Rupertus – author of the Rifleman's Creed

The Rifleman's Creed (also known as My Rifle and The Creed of the United States Marine) is a part of basic United States Marine Corps doctrine. Major General William H. Rupertus wrote it during World War II following the attack on Pearl Harbor between late 1941 and early 1942, but its first publication was in San Diego in the Marine Corps Chevron on March 14, 1942. His reasoning for writing the Creed is believed to be that he felt that his men had to understand the concept "that the only weapon which stands between them and Death is the rifle...they must understand that their rifle is their life..."

In the past, all enlisted Marines would learn the Creed at recruit training. However, in recent years the Creed has been relegated to the back pages of the standard recruit training guide book, and its memorization is no longer considered required for recruits, but its significance is passed through drill instructors to their recruits throughout each cycle. Different, more concise versions of the Creed have developed since its early days, but those closest to the original version remain the most widely accepted.

== Purpose ==
United States Marine Corps Eagle Globe and Anchor

The Rifleman's Creed continues to stand as a pillar concerning the ethos of the Marine Corps. In recruit training for enlisted Marines and Officer Candidates School for commissioned officers the Rifleman's Creed is inescapable. Whilst its continued recitation varies from company to company, platoon to platoon, its presence is assured during the period of recruit training. The Rifleman's Creed is one of the keystones of the United States Marine Corps doctrine and helps designate that every Marine is, first and foremost, a Rifleman regardless of Military Occupational Specialty (or MOS) designation. Even now, in the United States Marine Corps rifle training data book, given to recruits when undertaking Table 1 of rifle qualification, the Rifleman's Creed is printed within the data book to ensure that prior to picking up a weapon a Marine understands what their rifle means to them and their Corps. The last page of the data book reinforces this ideology with the quote from General Alfred M. Gray Jr., the 29th Commandant of the Marine Corps: "Every Marine is, first and foremost, a rifleman. All other conditions are secondary." The Creed itself utilizes a sense of anthropomorphism in order to coerce Marines into seeing their rifle as more than a simple tool of war. This sense of almost familial attachment that a Marine feels towards their rifle is paramount, as a Marine would never leave a man behind, they would also not leave their rifle.

== Current text ==
Rifleman's Creed

This is my rifle. There are many like it, but this one is mine.

My rifle is my best friend. It is my life. I must master it as I must master my life.

Without me, my rifle is useless. Without my rifle, I am useless. I must fire my rifle true. I must shoot straighter than my enemy who is trying to kill me. I must shoot him before he shoots me. I will ...

My rifle and I know that what counts in war is not the rounds we fire, the noise of our burst, nor the smoke we make. We know that it is the hits that count. We will hit ...

My rifle is human, even as I [am human], because it is my life. Thus, I will learn it as a brother. I will learn its weaknesses, its strength, its parts, its accessories, its sights and its barrel. I will ever guard it against the ravages of weather and damage as I will ever guard my legs, my arms, my eyes and my heart against damage. I will keep my rifle clean and ready. We will become part of each other. We will ...

Before God, I swear this creed. My rifle and I are the defenders of my country. We are the masters of our enemy. We are the saviors of my life.

So be it, until victory is America's and there is no enemy, but peace!

== In popular culture ==
- The Rifleman's Creed is used multiple times in Stanley Kubrick's 1987 film Full Metal Jacket including the now famous scene involving Private Pyle and his partial recitation of the Creed in the bathroom prior to his murder of Gunnery Sergeant Hartman and his subsequent suicide. Kubrick's continued use of the Rifleman's Creed throughout the first section of the film represents the dehumanization of the recruits as a whole.
- The 2005 film Jarhead includes multiple scenes with a modified version of the Rifleman's Creed. The Creed is introduced by Staff Sergeant Sykes and reused in the film on multiple occasions and, whilst the entirety of the Creed is not used, it does succeed in alerting the audience to the motif-like element of the Creed's use in Full Metal Jacket.
- In Family Guy, season 7, episode 4, Joe Swanson rehearses a modified version of the Creed. The scene takes place in a cut away where he replaces the subject of a rifle with his wheelchair.
- The eleventh episode of the comedy anime My Deer Friend Nokotan contains a recitation of the Creed by a Matagi who recites it before battling Shikanoko.
- Leroy Jethro Gibbs (Mark Harmon) recites the beginning of the Creed on NCIS episode "Scope," season 13, episode 18.

== See also ==
- Airman's Creed
- Coast Guardsmen's Creed
- Noncommissioned officer's creed
- Ordnance Soldier's Creed
- Quartermaster Creed
- Ranger Creed
- Sailor's Creed
- Soldier's Creed
