= Sailor's Creed =

US Navy code of ethics

The Sailor's Creed is a code of ethics of the United States Navy, originally developed for the promotion of personal excellence.

While other regulations, codes, and standards may apply to the United States Armed Forces writ large, the Sailor's Creed is specific to the Navy. It focuses on self-respect, respect for others, and the Navy's core values of honor, courage, and commitment. Recited by units almost daily, the Sailor's Creed reinforces the notion that personnel are sailors first (i.e., before their rating) and seeks to build esprit de corps throughout the Navy as a whole.

== History ==
=== Original version ===
The first version of the Sailor's Creed came from an idea in 1986 by Admiral James D. Watkins, Chief of Naval Operations, to form a group that would create a Code of Ethics for the Navy. The result of this meeting at the Naval War College was the eight-point The Navy Uniform, and was later scaled down to a shorter version called the Sailor's Creed. The original text was as follows:

Original Sailor's Creed

I have chosen to serve in the United States Navy. America depends on my performance for her survival, and I accept the challenge to set my standards high, placing my country's well-being above self-interest.

I will be loyal to my country, its Constitution and laws, and to my shipmates.

I will be honest in my personal and professional life and encourage my shipmates to do the same.

I will, to the best of my ability, do the right thing for its own sake, and I am prepared to face pain or death in defense of my country.

I will be a professional, wearing my uniform with pride and accepting responsibility for my actions.

I will set excellence as my standard and always strive for ways to make me a better sailor and my crew a better crew.

=== Current version ===
The current version of the Sailor's Creed was a product of many Blue Ribbon Recruit Training Panels in 1993 at the direction of Admiral Frank B. Kelso II, Chief of Naval Operations. It has been revised twice, once in 1994 under the direction of Chief of Naval Operations Admiral Jeremy Boorda, changing "bluejacket" to "Navy", and again in 1997, changing "my superiors" to "those appointed over me." These changes were made to make the creed inclusively descriptive of all hands. The creed is taught and recited in boot camp typically before taps, and at some officer accession programs.

Current Sailor's Creed

I am a United States Sailor.

I will support and defend the Constitution of the United States of America and I will obey the orders of those appointed over me.

I represent the fighting spirit of the Navy and those who have gone before me to defend freedom and democracy around the world.

I proudly serve my country's Navy combat team with Honor, Courage, and Commitment.

I am committed to excellence and the fair treatment of all.

== See also ==
- Rifleman's Creed
- Airman's Creed
- Soldier's Creed
- Quartermaster Creed
- Ranger Creed
- Creed of the United States Coast Guardsman
- Noncommissioned officer's creed
