= Airman's Creed =

Creed for members of the U.S. Air Force

The Airman's Creed is a creed for members of the U.S. Air Force. It was introduced in 2007 by General T. Michael Moseley, Chief of Staff of the U.S. Air Force. In a letter introducing the creed, Moseley wrote that one of his "top priorities" was to "reinvigorate the warrior ethos in every Airman of our Total Force."

This creed supplanted all other prior creeds that the Air Force had been using, including the NCO Creed, SNCO Creed, the Chief's creed, and the First Sergeant's Creed.

== Text ==
The Airman's Creed

I am an American Airman.
I am a Warrior.
I have answered my Nation’s call.
I am an American Airman.
My mission is to Fly, Fight, and Win.
I am faithful to a Proud Heritage,
A Tradition of Honor,
And a Legacy of Valor.
I am an American Airman.
Guardian of Freedom and Justice,
My Nation’s Sword and shield,
Its Sentry and Avenger.
I defend my Country with my Life.
I am an American Airman.
Wingman, Leader, Warrior.
I will never leave an Airman behind,
I will never falter,
And I will not fail.

== See also ==
- Soldier's Creed
- Quartermaster Creed
- Ranger Creed
- Rifleman's Creed (USMC)
- Sailor's Creed
- Creed of the United States Coast Guardsman
- Noncommissioned officer's creed
