= The Creed (video game) =

1999 video game

- Developers: Insomnia Entertainment, Dreamtime Interactive
- Publishers: EU: Midas Interactive Entertainment; NA: Electronic Arts
- Platform: Windows
- Release: AS: 3 February 1999; NA/EU: March 1999
- Genres: Action adventure game, third-person shooter
- Mode: Single-player

The Creed is a 1999 action-adventure game created by Australian developers Insomnia Entertainment and Dreamtime Interactive, and published by Electronic Arts and Midas Interactive. The game is a cyberpunk-themed action-adventure game set in a partial open world, allowing players to complete open-ended missions for the game's various factions. Upon a limited release in the Asia-Pacific, The Creed received praise from Australian publications for its atmosphere and environmental design.

== Gameplay ==
In-game screenshot of the third-person view combat in The Creed.

The Creed is an action-adventure game played in third-person view. The game's setting, a colony named Cereberus on the planet Outpost V is partially open-world and players are free to explore Cerberus and take up one of over 150 single player missions for the three in-game factions. The player can choose to play as bounty hunter Guy Wolfe or female assassin Gene Matrix. Players are tasked with escaping Cerberus after crash-landing on the planet. To do this, players accumulate credits through completing missions for three factions: the corrupt Government, the evil religious cult Order, or the organized crime group Brotherhood, each with their own set mission tree. Players participate in combat using 35 different weapons, vehicles, mechs and special items to defeat enemies. The game features network multiplayer for up to 8 players for co-operative or competitive missions. The Creed also features a level editor titled the Advanced Gaming Operating System, which allows users to develop additional missions by editing characters, behaviours and the player inventory. Custom missions developed by players using the system were featured on the game's website.

== Development ==
An early alpha build of The Creed was released for promotional distribution in 1998. Following pre-release, Insomniac Entertainment was requested to alter the script at the direction of publisher Electronic Arts, who raised objection to the level of profanity in the game. Electronic Arts ultimately abandoned international distribution of The Creed, with the game limited release in the Asia-Pacific in 1999. Midas Interactive republished the game in 2001.

== Reception ==
Reception

Review scores
Publication	Score
Hyper	80%
PC PowerPlay	86%
PC Player	25%
Game Over	86% / 72%

Early previews of the game were cautious about the scope and level of completion of The Creed. Ultimate PC, previewing the game prior to its release, noted that "The Creed still needs some work done on it...the controls in general are too complicated...and the only missions available on the code we've played were pretty similar and involved assassinations. Repeating these for 150 missions will make the game very repetitive." Reception for The Creed was positive in Australian computer gaming publications upon release, with particular praise for the design and atmosphere of the game. Pete Sharpe of PC PowerPlay stated "there is a real sense of atmosphere ever present, from the ambient techno tones...through to the eerie Blade Runner-ish street lighting." March Stepnik of Hyper agreed, noting the game's "gloriously detailed world that oozes atmosphere...the detail is astounding, and the game world is beautifully brought to life." Reviewers found less merit in the multiplayer features of the game. Game Over stated The Creed's multiplayer was one of its "few faults", as "the lag made the game unplayable". Pete Sharpe of PC PowerPlay noted the Deathmatch feature "isn't a viable option" as the "simplistic moves just don't compare to the likes of Quake or Unreal Deatchmatch...first-person 3D games (are) way more immersive in this area."
