= Ranger Creed =

Official creed of the US Army Rangers

The Ranger Creed is the official creed of the United States Army Rangers. The Ranger Creed was written in 1974 by CSM Neal R. Gentry, the original command sergeant major of the reactivated 1st Ranger Battalion. It was initiated by the Battalion Commander, then-LTC Kenneth C. Leuer, and re-drafted by the battalion XO, MAJ "Rock" Hudson and finalized at Fort Stewart, Georgia in 1974 when the original cadre deployed there on 1 July 1974. Today, members of Ranger community recite the Ranger Creed during formations, ceremonies, physical training activities and upon graduations from the Ranger Assessment and Selection Program (RASP) and the U.S. Army Ranger Course.

== Ranger Handbook version ==
Recognizing that I volunteered as a Ranger, fully knowing the hazards of my chosen profession, I will always endeavor to uphold the prestige, honor, and high esprit de corps of my Ranger Regiment.
Acknowledging the fact that a Ranger is a more elite soldier who arrives at the cutting edge of battle by land, sea, or air, I accept the fact that as a Ranger my country expects me to move further, faster and fight harder than any other soldier.
Never shall I fail my comrades. I will always keep myself mentally alert, physically strong and morally straight and I will shoulder more than my share of the task whatever it may be, one-hundred-percent and then some.
Gallantly will I show the world that I am a specially selected and well-trained soldier. My courtesy to superior officers, neatness of dress and care of equipment shall set the example for others to follow.
Energetically will I meet the enemies of my country. I shall defeat them on the field of battle for I am better trained and will fight with all my might. Surrender is not a Ranger word. I will never leave a fallen comrade to fall into the hands of the enemy and under no circumstances will I ever embarrass my country.
Readily will I display the intestinal fortitude required to fight on to the Ranger objective and complete the mission though I be the lone survivor.
Rangers Lead The Way!!!

— Ranger Handbook SH 21-76

== Variations ==
The very first draft by CSM Neal R. Gentry used the phrasing "of the Ranger Battalion." Eventually, after some revisions on the overall creed, they settled on "of my Ranger Battalion." The Ranger School cadre later adopted the phrasing "of the Rangers" as seen in the Ranger Creed above. After the formation of the 75th Ranger Regiment, members of all battalions adopted the wording, "of my Ranger Regiment", and this version remains in use throughout the regiment.

== See also ==
- Soldier's Creed
- Sailor's Creed
- Airman's Creed
- Code of the U.S. Fighting Force
- Creed of the United States Coast Guardsman
- Rifleman's Creed
- Noncommissioned officer's Creed
