= Credo (Vivaldi) =

Composition by Antonio Vivaldi

The Credo in E minor (RV 591) is the only extant in chorale setting of the Nicene Creed by Antonio Vivaldi. Another setting exists (RV 592) but is of dubious authenticity.

== Settings ==
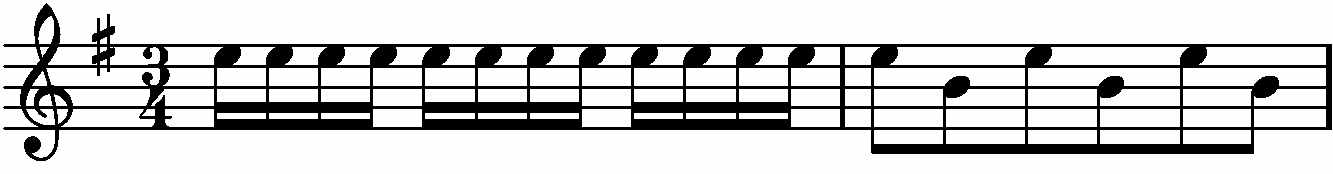
mm. 1–2 of the Violini I e II staff of RV 591.

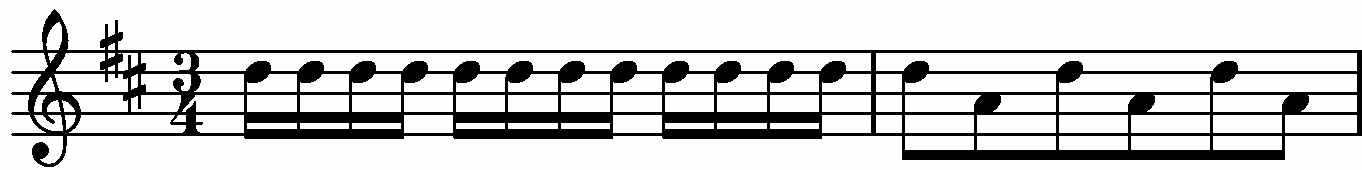
mm. 129–130 of the Violino I staff of RV 588.

Credo
I. Credo in Unum Deum

I. Credo – II. Et Incarnatus Est

III. Crucifixus
Performed by the Advent Chamber Orchestra with the Advent Choir directed by Gabriel Pavel

RV 591 has four movements. In a style similar to his psalm setting of In exitu Israel (RV 604), the first movement adorns the chorus' simple rhythms of crotchets and minims with the orchestra playing semiquavers and quavers. The second movement is a brief choral episode in the stile antico, borrowing thematic material from the composer's Magnificat. The fourth movement is based on a semiquaver-quaver motif similar to the first movement, and closes with a fugue.

The first (and final) movements open with a motif which bears similarity to a brief passage found in the first movement of the Gloria (RV 588).

1. Credo in unum Deum
2. Et incarnatus est
3. Crucifixus
4. Et Resurrexit

=== RV 592 ===
RV 592 is a disputed composition, attributed to Johann Adolph Hasse.

== Editions ==
- Vivaldi: Credo RV 591, Stuttgart Carus-Verlag 1974
