= Mike Carey (writer) =

British writer (born 1959)

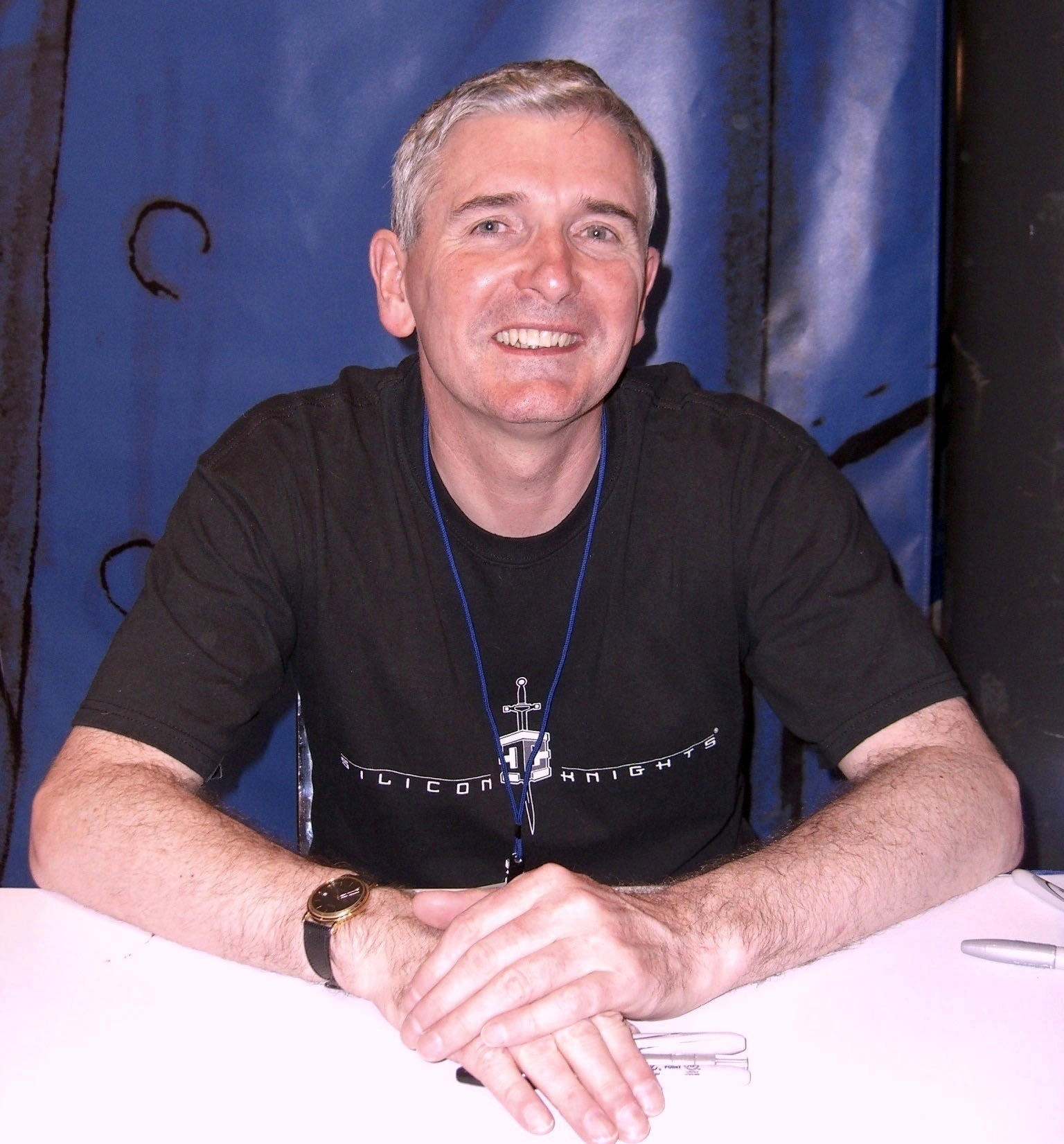
- Carey at the New York Comic Con in Manhattan, 10 October 2010
- Born: Michael James Carey; 1959 (age 66–67) Liverpool, England
- Area: Writer
- Notable works: Lucifer; Hellblazer; The Unwritten; X-Men: Legacy; The Girl with All the Gifts
- Awards: Inkpot Award (2012); Philip K. Dick Award (2026); World Fantasy Award for Best Novel (2026)

Michael James Carey (born 1959), also known by his pen name M. R. Carey, is a British writer of comic books, novels and films, whose credits include the long-running The Sandman spin-off series Lucifer, a three-year stint on Hellblazer, as well as his creator-owned titles Crossing Midnight and The Unwritten for DC Comics' Vertigo imprint, a lengthy run on Marvel's X-Men, the 2014 novel The Girl with All the Gifts and its 2016 film adaptation.

== Early life and career ==
Carey was born in Liverpool, England, in 1959. He describes his young self as "one of those ominously quiet kids... [who] lived so much inside my own head I only had vestigial limbs". As a child, he maintained an interest in comics, writing and drawing primitive stories to entertain his younger brother. He studied English at St Peter's College, Oxford and, upon graduation, became a teacher. He taught for 15 years before moving on to writing comics.

== Writing career ==
After a series of one-off jobs for independent comics companies, including a biographical Ozzy Osbourne comic and a fantasy tale starring the band Pantera, Carey became a contributor to the British comics anthology 2000 AD, where he co-created the original series Thirteen and Carver Hale, and wrote two series for The Sandman Presents line published by DC Comics' Vertigo imprint, Lucifer and Petrefax. Lucifer was subsequently extended into an ongoing series, which Carey wrote for its entire 75-issue run. Further work for Vertigo includes a 40-issue run on the imprint's flagship title Hellblazer as well as the spin-off graphic novel All His Engines, several creator-owned endeavors, such as the six-part mini-series Faker with art by Jock and the ongoing series Crossing Midnight with artist Jim Fern, and two more The Sandman spin-offs in the form of graphic novels, The Sandman Presents: The Furies and God Save the Queen, both created with artist John Bolton. In 2009, Carey launched his longest creator-owned series to date, The Unwritten, co-created with the Lucifer collaborator Peter Gross and featuring covers by Yuko Shimizu.

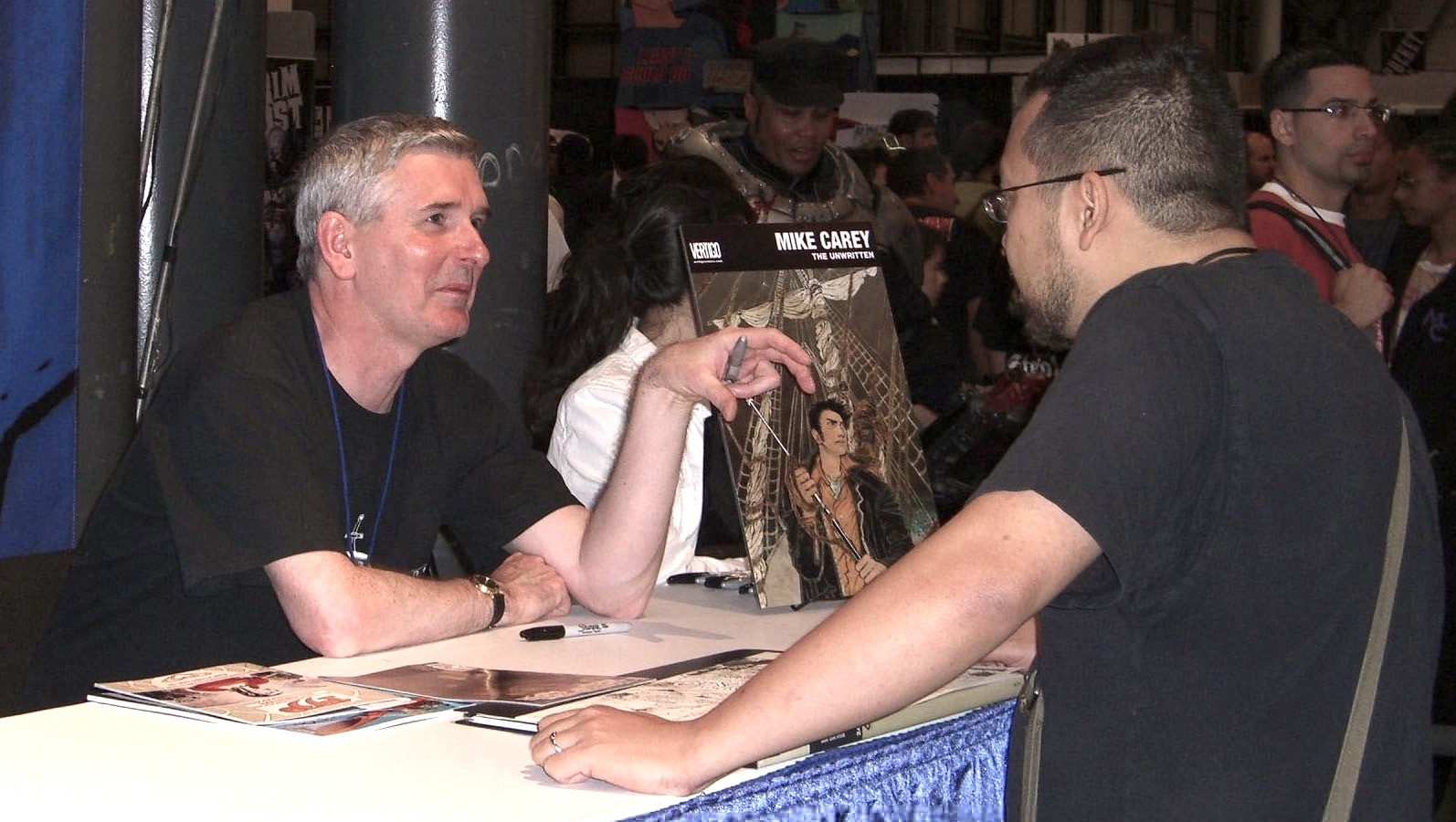
Carey at the DC Comics booth at the New York Comic Con, 10 October 2010

Other work for DC Comics includes the long-delayed reboot of Wildstorm's Wetworks and two graphic novels for the Minx imprint aimed at the teenage female audience, one of which was co-written by Carey with his daughter Louise. In 2003, Carey was announced as the new writer of the Firestorm ongoing series, however, he left the project few months after the announcement as the editors wanted to take it in a different direction. The series was launched in 2004 with Dan Jolley as the writer.

In 2006, Carey took over the writing duties of Marvel's X-Men series, which was soon rebranded into X-Men: Legacy. He saw the title through a number of inter-title crossovers between the various X-Men books such as "Endangered Species", "Messiah Complex", "Original Sin" (a crossover between X-Men: Legacy and Wolverine: Origins that was tentatively titled "Dark Deception") and "Age of X". Carey wrote X-Men: Legacy for six years and contributed a number of X-Men stories to other publications, such as two tie-ins to the "Secret Invasion" crossover storyline, the four-issue mini-series Secret Invasion: X-Men and an eight-page story in the one-shot anthology Secret Invasion: Who Do You Trust? featuring Abigail Brand of S.W.O.R.D., a retelling of Beast's origin story as part of the X-Men: Origins line and an Iceman serial in the X-Men: Manifest Destiny anthology series. Other work for Marvel includes the comic book adaptation of Orson Scott Card's Ender's Shadow.

Carey's first novel, The Devil You Know, was released in the UK by Orbit books in April 2006, and as a hardcover in the US in July 2007. Its sequel, Vicious Circle, was published in October 2006, and the following three novels in the series, Dead Men's Boots, Thicker Than Water, and The Naming of the Beasts, followed in September 2007, March 2009 and September 2009, respectively. What would have been Carey's first feature film, the erotic ghost story Frost Flowers, was reported to be in pre-production in June 2006, with filming to begin that September under the direction of Andrea Vecchiato. Carey was also reported to work on the TV adaptation of his comic book series The Stranded, a co-production between Virgin Comics and the Syfy network. Also for Virgin, Carey took part in the short-lived Coalition Comix project created in association with Myspace, where users could suggest ideas for a comic which then would be used during its production.

In 2014, Carey published another novel, The Girl with All the Gifts. That same year, the screenplay of the same name, written by Carey concurrently with the novel, appeared on the Brit List. Filming began in May 2015, with Colm McCarthy directing and Gemma Arterton, Paddy Considine, Glenn Close and Sennia Nanua starring. The story, depicting a post-apocalyptic future where most of humanity is wiped out by a fungal infection, focuses on the struggle of a scientist, a teacher and two soldiers who embark on a journey of survival with a special young girl named Melanie.

In 2017 The Boy on the Bridge was published, a novel set in the same post-apocalyptic world of The Girl with All the Gifts but featuring a different set of characters.

His 2025 novel, Once Was Willem won the 2026 World Fantasy Award for Best Novel.

== Bibliography ==
=== Comics ===
==== Early work ====
- Toxic! #30–31: "Aquarius" (with Ken Meyer, Jr., anthology, Apocalypse Ltd, 1991)
- Rock-It Comix:
  - Ozzy Osbourne: "The Comeback" (with Tom Kyffin, one-shot, 1993)
  - Pantera: "Power in the Darkness" (with Trevor Goring, one-shot, 1994)
- Caliber:
  - Inferno #1–5 (with Michael Gaydos, 1995–1996) collected as Inferno (tpb, 144 pages, Titan, 2003, ISBN 1-84023-764-3)
  - Negative Burn #49: "Suicide Kings" (with P. J. Holden, anthology, 1997)
  - Dr. Faustus (with Mike Perkins, one-shot, Tome Press, 1997)
- 2000 AD (anthology, Fleetway/Rebellion):
  - Pulp Sci-Fi:
    - "Eggs is Eggs" (with Cliff Robinson, in #1145, 1999)
    - "Doin' Time" (with Ben McCloud, in #1147, 1999)
  - Tharg's Future Shocks (with John Charles, in #1230 and 1287, 2001–2002)
  - Carver Hale (with Mike Perkins, in #1236–1240 and 1247–1249, 2001) collected as Carver Hale: Twisting the Knife (hc, 44 pages, 2005, ISBN 1-904265-62-6)
  - Tharg the Mighty: "A Night 2 Remember" (with Anthony Williams, one page in 2000 AD's 25th anniversary strip featuring a D. R. & Quinch cameo, in #1280, 2002)
  - Thirteen (with Andy Clarke, in #1289–1299, 2002) collected as Thirteen (tpb, 96 pages, DC Comics, 2005, ISBN 1-904265-36-7)
- Just 1 Page (series of charity benefit anthology one-shots self-published by Adrian Brown for Comic Festival):
  - Just 1 Page: Heroes: "Little Nemo" (with Adrian Brown, one-page strip, 2001)
  - Just 1 Page: Brits: "Wham! and Smash!" (text article detailing the history of the eponymous comics magazines, 2003)
- 9-11 Volume 1: "In the House of Light" (with Mike Collins, anthology graphic novel, 196 pages, Dark Horse, 2002, ISBN 1-56389-881-0)

==== DC Comics ====
- The Sandman Presents (Vertigo):
  - The Sandman Presents: Lucifer #1–3: "The Morningstar Option" (with Scott Hampton, 1999)
  - The Sandman Presents: Petrefax #1–4: "Travels in Malegrise" (with Steve Leialoha, 2000)
  - The Sandman Presents: The Furies (with John Bolton, graphic novel, hc, 96 pages, 2002, ISBN 1-56389-935-3; sc, 2003, ISBN 1-4012-0093-1)
- Lucifer (with Chris Weston (#1–3), Warren Pleece (#4), Peter Gross, Dean Ormston, David Hahn (#41), Ted Naifeh (#45), P. Craig Russell (#50), Marc Hempel (#55), Ronald Wimberly (#58), Colleen Doran (#62), Michael Kaluta (#66) and Zander Cannon (#70), Vertigo, 2000–2006) collected as:
  - Book One (collects #1–13 and The Sandman Presents: Lucifer #1–3, tpb, 392 pages, 2013, ISBN 1-4012-4026-7)
  - Book Two (collects #14–28, tpb, 416 pages, 2013, ISBN 1-4012-4260-X)
  - Book Three (collects #29–45, tpb, 400 pages, 2014, ISBN 1-4012-4604-4)
    - Includes the Lucifer: Nirvana one-shot (written by Carey, art by Jon J Muth, 2002)
  - Book Four (collects #46–61, tpb, 392 pages, 2014, ISBN 1-4012-4605-2)
  - Book Five (collects #62–75, tpb, 352 pages, 2014, ISBN 1-4012-4945-0)
  - Omnibus Volume 1 (collects #1–35, The Sandman Presents: Lucifer #1–3 and Lucifer: Nirvana, hc, 1,000 pages, 2019, ISBN 1-4012-9476-6)
  - Omnibus Volume 2 (collects #36–75, hc, 1,040 pages, 2020, ISBN 1-77950-564-7)
- Flinch #16: "The Wedding Breakfast" (with Craig Hamilton, anthology, Vertigo, 2001) collected in Flinch Book Two (tpb, 192 pages, 2016, ISBN 1-4012-6139-6)
- Hellblazer:
  - 9-11 Volume 2: "Exposed" (with Marcelo Frusin, anthology graphic novel, 224 pages, 2002, ISBN 1-56389-878-0) collected in John Constantine, Hellblazer Volume 25 (tpb, 352 pages, 2021, ISBN 1-77951-029-2)
  - Hellblazer (with Steve Dillon (#175–176, 200), Marcelo Frusin, Jock (#181), Lee Bermejo (#182–183), Doug Alexander (#187–188), Leonardo Manco, Chris Brunner (#196), Giuseppe Camuncoli (#206), Frazer Irving (#213) and John Paul Leon (#227), Vertigo, 2002–2007) collected as:
    - John Constantine, Hellblazer Volume 16 (collects #175–188, tpb, 328 pages, 2017, ISBN 1-4012-6909-5)
    - John Constantine, Hellblazer Volume 17 (collects #189–201, tpb, 328 pages, 2017, ISBN 1-4012-7366-1)
    - John Constantine, Hellblazer Volume 18 (collects #202–215, tpb, 328 pages, 2018, ISBN 1-4012-7538-9)
    - John Constantine, Hellblazer Volume 19 (includes #229, tpb, 328 pages, 2018, ISBN 1-4012-8080-3)
  - Hellblazer: All His Engines (with Leonardo Manco, graphic novel, hc, 128 pages, Vertigo, 2005, ISBN 1-4012-0316-7; sc, 2006, ISBN 1-4012-0317-5) collected in John Constantine, Hellblazer Volume 20 (tpb, 328 pages, 2019, ISBN 1-4012-8569-4)
- Batman:
  - Batman: Gotham Knights #37: "Fear is the Key" (with Steve Mannion, co-feature, 2003) collected in Batman: Black and White Volume 3 (hc, 288 pages, 2007, ISBN 1-4012-1531-9; tpb, 2008, ISBN 1-4012-1354-5)
  - Detective Comics #801–804: "The Barker: When You're Strange" (with John Lucas, co-feature, 2005)
- My Faith in Frankie #1–4 (with Sonny Liew, Vertigo, 2004) collected as My Faith in Frankie (tpb, 112 pages, 2004, ISBN 1-4012-0390-6)
- Neil Gaiman's Neverwhere #1–9 (with Glenn Fabry, Vertigo, 2005–2006) collected as Neil Gaiman's Neverwhere (tpb, 224 pages, 2007, ISBN 1-4012-1007-4)
- Wetworks vol. 2 (with Whilce Portacio, Peter Gross (#7–8) and Dave Taylor (#9), Wildstorm, 2006–2008) collected as:
  - Volume 1 (collects #1–5, tpb, 136 pages, 2007, ISBN 1-4012-1375-8)
    - Includes the 6-page untitled preview story (art by Whilce Portacio) from the Coup d'Etat: Afterword one-shot (2004)
  - Volume 2 (includes #6–9, tpb, 160 pages, 2008, ISBN 1-4012-1639-0)
- Crossing Midnight (with Jim Fern, Inaki Miranda (#7), Eric Nguyen (#10–12) and Gabriel Hernández Walta + Mateo Guerrero (#16), Vertigo, 2007–2008) collected as:
  - Cut Here (collects #1–5, tpb, 128 pages, 2007, ISBN 1-4012-1341-3)
  - A Map of Midnight (collects #6–12, tpb, 168 pages, 2008, ISBN 1-4012-1645-5)
  - The Sword in the Soul (collects #13–19, tpb, 168 pages, 2008, ISBN 1-4012-1966-7)
- God Save the Queen (with John Bolton, graphic novel, hc, 96 pages, Vertigo, 2007, ISBN 1-4012-0303-5; sc, 2008, ISBN 1-4012-0304-3)
- Re-Gifters (with Sonny Liew, graphic novel, 176 pages, Minx, 2007, ISBN 1-4012-0371-X)
- Confessions of a Blabbermouth (co-written by Carey and his daughter Louise, art by Aaron Alexovich, graphic novel, 176 pages, Minx, 2007, ISBN 1-4012-1148-8)
- Faker #1–6 (with Jock, Vertigo, 2007–2008) collected as Faker (tpb, 160 pages, 2008, ISBN 1-4012-1663-3)
- The Unwritten (Vertigo):
  - The Unwritten (with Peter Gross, Jimmy Broxton (#10–11), Kurt Huggins (#12), Ryan Kelly (#17), Vince Locke (#19–23, 27–30, 33.5), Al Davison (#24), M. K. Perker (#31–35), Michael Kaluta + Rick Geary + Bryan Talbot (#31.1), Dean Ormston (#32.5, 45–46, 52–54), Gary Erskine (#34.5), Gabriel Hernández Walta (#35.5), Rufus Dayglo (#36) and Mark Buckingham (#50–54), 2009–2013) collected as:
    - Tommy Taylor and the Bogus Identity (collects #1–5, tpb, 144 pages, 2010, ISBN 1-4012-2565-9)
    - Inside Man (collects #6–12, tpb, 168 pages, 2010, ISBN 1-4012-2873-9)
    - Dead Man's Knock (collects #13–18, tpb, 160 pages, 2011, ISBN 1-4012-3046-6)
    - Leviathan (collects #19–24, tpb, 144 pages, 2011, ISBN 1-4012-3292-2)
    - On to Genesis (collects #25–30, tpb, 144 pages, 2012, ISBN 1-4012-3359-7)
    - Tommy Taylor and the War of Words (collects #31–35 and 31.5–35.5, tpb, 240 pages, 2012, ISBN 1-4012-3560-3)
    - The Wound (collects #36–41, tpb, 144 pages, 2013, ISBN 1-4012-3806-8)
    - Orpheus in the Underworlds (collects #42–49, tpb, 176 pages, 2014, ISBN 1-4012-4301-0)
    - The Unwritten Fables (collects #50–54, tpb, 144 pages, 2014, ISBN 1-4012-4694-X)
  - The Unwritten: Tommy Taylor and the Ship That Sank Twice (with Peter Gross, graphic novel, hc, 160 pages, 2013, ISBN 1-4012-2976-X; sc, 2014, ISBN 1-4012-2977-8)
  - The Unwritten: Apocalypse (with Peter Gross, Al Davison (#5) and Vince Locke (#9), 2014–2015) collected as:
    - The Unwritten: War Stories (collects #1–5, tpb, 128 pages, 2014, ISBN 1-4012-5055-6)
    - The Unwritten: Apocalypse (collects #6–12, tpb, 176 pages, 2015, ISBN 1-4012-5348-2)
- House of Mystery Halloween Annual #2: "Infernal Bargains: Just Say No!" (with Peter Gross, co-feature, Vertigo, 2010) collected in House of Mystery: Conception (tpb, 160 pages, 2012, ISBN 1-4012-3264-7)
- Vertigo Quarterly: SFX #2: "Schrödinger's Catflap" (with Tana Ford, anthology, 2015) collected in SFX (tpb, 296 pages, 2016, ISBN 1-4012-6147-7)
- Dollhouse Family #1–6 (with Peter Gross and Vince Locke, Hill House, 2020) collected as Dollhouse Family (hc, 160 pages, 2020, ISBN 1-77950-464-0; tpb, 2021, ISBN 1-77951-319-4)

==== Marvel Comics ====
- Ultimate Marvel:
  - Ultimate Elektra #1–5 (with Salvador Larroca, 2004–2005) collected as Ultimate Elektra: Devil's Due (tpb, 120 pages, 2005, ISBN 0-7851-1504-8)
  - Ultimate Fantastic Four (with Jae Lee (#19–20), Stuart Immonen + Frazer Irving (Annual #2), Pasqual Ferry, Mark Brooks, Tyler Kirkham and Eric Basaldua (#56), 2005–2008) collected as:
    - Volume 2 (includes #19–20, hc, 240 pages, 2006, ISBN 0-7851-2058-0)
    - Volume 4 (collects #33–41 and Annual #2, hc, 320 pages, 2007, ISBN 0-7851-2872-7)
      - Includes the 2-issue spin-off limited series Ultimate X4 (written by Carey, art by Pasqual Ferry and Leinil Francis Yu (#2), 2006)
    - Volume 5 (collects #42–53, hc, 288 pages, 2008, ISBN 0-7851-3082-9)
    - Volume 6 (includes #54–57, hc, 256 pages, 2009, ISBN 0-7851-3781-5)
    - Omnibus Volume 1 (includes #19–20, hc, 856 pages, 2025, ISBN 1-3029-6366-X)
    - Omnibus Volume 2 (includes #33–57, Annual #2 and Ultimate X4 #1–2, hc, 896 pages, 2026, ISBN 1-3029-6797-5)
  - Ultimate Vision #1–5 (with Brandon Peterson, 2007–2008) collected as Ultimate Vision (tpb, 160 pages, 2008, ISBN 0-7851-2173-0)
- Spellbinders #1–6 (with Mike Perkins, 2005) collected as Spellbinders: Signs and Wonders (tpb, 144 pages, 2012, ISBN 0-7851-6488-X)
- Fantastic Four:
  - Fantastic Four: The Movie (with Dan Jurgens, one-shot, 2005) collected in Fantastic Four: The Movie (tpb, 120 pages, 2005, ISBN 0-7851-1809-8)
  - Marvel Holiday Special (anthology):
    - Marvel Holiday Special 2005: "Christmas Day in Manhattan" (with Mike Perkins, 2006) collected in Marvel Holiday Digest (tpb, 144 pages, 2006, ISBN 0-7851-2300-8)
    - Marvel Holiday Special 2006: "A is for Annihilus" (with Mike Perkins, 2007)
    - Marvel Holiday Special 2007: "The Meaning of Christmas" (with Nelson DeCastro, 2008)
  - What If...? (featuring the Fantastic Four): "What If the Fantastic Four were Cosmonauts?" (with Marshall Rogers, one-shot, 2006) collected in What If: Mirror Mirror (tpb, 152 pages, 2006, ISBN 0-7851-1902-7)
  - Fantastic Four: Negative Zone: "Ethical Dilemmas in Modern Science" (with Stefano Caselli, co-feature in one-shot, 2019) collected in Fantastic Four: Thing vs. Immortal Hulk (tpb, 120 pages, 2020, ISBN 1-302-91725-0)
- X-Men:
  - X-Men vol. 2 (rebranded as X-Men: Legacy starting with issue #208; art by Chris Bachalo (#188–190, 192–193, 197–200, 205–207), Clayton Henry (#191), Humberto Ramos (#194–196, 200–203), Mark Brooks (Annual #1), Scot Eaton (co-features in #200 and 204 + issues #208–215, 217–218, 220–224), Mike Perkins (co-feature in #203), Mike Choi (#204), John Romita, Jr. (#208), Billy Tan (#209), Greg Land (#210, 235–237), Brandon Peterson (#211), Mike Deodato, Jr. (#212), Ken Lashley (#214), Marco Checchetto (#215), Philippe Briones (#216, 219, 225), Dustin Weaver (#226–227), Daniel Acuña (#228–230, X-Men: Legacy Annual #1), Mirco Pierfederici (#230, X-Men: Legacy Annual #1), Clay Mann (#231–233, 238–241, 245–247), Yanick Paquette (#234), Tom Raney (#241), Paul Davidson (#242–243), Harvey Tolibao (#244), Jorge Molina (#248), Rafa Sandoval (#249), Khoi Pham (#250–253, 257, 259–260) and Steve Kurth (#250, 254–256, 258), 2006–2012) collected as:
    - X-Men: Supernovas (collects #188–199 and X-Men vol. 2 Annual #1, hc, 336 pages, 2007, ISBN 0-7851-2514-0; tpb, 2008, ISBN 0-7851-2319-9)
    - X-Men: Blinded by the Light (collects #200–204, tpb, 144 pages, 2008, ISBN 0-7851-2544-2)
    - X-Men: Endangered Species (includes the co-features from #200 and 203–204, hc, 192 pages, 2008, ISBN 0-7851-3012-8; tpb, 2008, ISBN 0-7851-2820-4)
      - Also collects the X-Men: Endangered Species one-shot (written by Carey, art by Scot Eaton, 2007)
      - Also collects the "Endangered Species" chapters originally published as co-features in Uncanny X-Men #488–489 (written by Carey, art by Mark Bagley (#488) and Mike Perkins (#489), 2007)
      - Also collects the "Endangered Species" chapters originally published as co-features in X-Factor vol. 3 #21–22 (written by Carey, art by Mark Bagley (#21) and Mike Perkins (#22), 2007)
      - Also collects the "Endangered Species" chapter originally published as the co-feature in New X-Men vol. 2 #42 (written by Carey, art Mike Perkins, 2007)
    - X-Men: Messiah Complex (includes #205–207, hc, 352 pages, 2008, ISBN 0-7851-2899-9; tpb, 2008, ISBN 0-7851-2320-2)
    - X-Men: Legacy – Divided He Stands (collects #208–212, hc, 120 pages, 2008, ISBN 0-7851-3000-4; tpb, 2008, ISBN 0-7851-3001-2)
    - X-Men: Legacy – Sins of the Father (collects #213–216, hc, 168 pages, 2008, ISBN 0-7851-3002-0; tpb, 2009, ISBN 0-7851-3003-9)
    - X-Men: Original Sin (includes #217–218, hc, 144 pages, 2009, ISBN 0-7851-3038-1; tpb, 2009, ISBN 0-7851-2956-1)
      - Includes the X-Men: Original Sin one-shot (co-written by Carey and Daniel Way, art by Scot Eaton and Mike Deodato, Jr., 2008)
    - X-Men: Legacy – Salvage (collects #219–225, hc, 168 pages, 2009, ISBN 0-7851-4173-1; tpb, 2009, ISBN 0-7851-3876-5)
    - Dark Avengers/Uncanny X-Men: Utopia (includes #226–227, hc, 368 pages, 2009, ISBN 0-7851-4233-9; tpb, 2010, ISBN 0-7851-4234-7)
    - X-Men: Legacy – Emplate (collects #228–230 and X-Men: Legacy Annual #1, hc, 112 pages, 2010, ISBN 0-7851-4020-4; tpb, 2010, ISBN 0-7851-4115-4)
    - X-Necrosha (includes #231–234, hc, 448 pages, 2010, ISBN 0-7851-4674-1; tpb, 2010, ISBN 0-7851-4675-X)
      - Also collects "The Foretelling" short story (art by Laurence Campbell) from X-Necrosha (anthology one-shot, 2009)
    - X-Men: Second Coming (includes #235–237, hc, 392 pages, 2010, ISBN 0-7851-4678-4; tpb, 2011, ISBN 0-7851-5705-0)
      - Also collects the X-Men: Second Coming – Prepare free promotional one-shot (written by Carey, art by Stuart Immonen, 2010)
      - Also collects Carey's chapter of the epilogue from X-Men: Second Coming #2 (art by Esad Ribić, 2010)
    - X-Men: Legacy – Collision (collects #238–241, hc, 168 pages, 2011, ISBN 0-7851-4668-7; tpb, 2011, ISBN 0-7851-4669-5)
    - X-Men: Age of X (includes #245–247, hc, 256 pages, 2011, ISBN 0-7851-5289-X; tpb, 2012, ISBN 0-7851-5290-3)
      - Also collects the Age of X Alpha one-shot (written by Carey, art by Mirco Pierfederici, Gabriel Hernández Walta, Carlo Barberi, Paco Diaz and Paul Davidson, 2011)
      - Also collects New Mutants vol. 3 #22–24 (written by Carey, art by Steve Kurth, 2011)
    - X-Men: Legacy – Aftermath (collects #242–244 and 248–249, hc, 120 pages, 2011, ISBN 0-7851-5635-6; tpb, 2012, ISBN 0-7851-5636-4)
    - X-Men: Legacy – Lost Legions (collects #250–253, hc, 112 pages, 2011, ISBN 0-7851-5291-1; tpb, 2012, ISBN 0-7851-5292-X)
    - X-Men: Legacy – Five Miles South of the Universe (collects #254–260, hc, 160 pages, 2012, ISBN 0-7851-6067-1; tpb, 2012, ISBN 0-7851-6068-X)
  - Wolverine: Firebreak (with Scott Kolins, co-feature in one-shot, 2008) collected in Wolverine: Dangerous Games (hc, 144 pages, 2008, ISBN 0-7851-3471-9; tpb, 2009, ISBN 0-7851-3472-7)
  - X-Men: Divided We Stand (tpb, 136 pages, 2008, ISBN 0-7851-3265-1) includes:
    - X-Men: Divided We Stand (anthology):
      - "Danger Room" (with Brandon Peterson, in #1, 2008)
      - "Lights Out" (with Scot Eaton, in #2, 2008)
  - Secret Invasion: Who Do You Trust?: "In Plain Sight" (with Timothy Green II, anthology one-shot, 2008) collected in Secret Invasion: Who Do You Trust? (tpb, 176 pages, 2009, ISBN 0-7851-3409-3)
  - Secret Invasion: X-Men #1–4 (with Cary Nord and Miguel Sepulveda (#3–4), 2008–2009) collected as Secret Invasion: X-Men (tpb, 136 pages, 2009, ISBN 0-7851-3343-7)
  - Uncanny X-Men: Manifest Destiny (hc, 208 pages, 2009, ISBN 0-7851-3817-X; tpb, 2009, ISBN 0-7851-2451-9) includes:
    - Free Comic Book Day 2008: X-Men: "Pixies and Demons" (with Greg Land, one-shot, 2008)
    - X-Men: Manifest Destiny #1–5: "Kill or Cure" (with Michael Ryan, anthology, 2008–2009)
  - X-Men: Origins (hc, 192 pages, 2009, ISBN 0-7851-3451-4; tpb, 2010, ISBN 0-7851-3452-2) includes:
    - X-Men: Origins – Beast (with J. K. Woodward, one-shot, 2008)
    - X-Men: Origins – Gambit (with David Yardin, one-shot, 2009)
  - Breaking into Comics the Marvel Way! #2: "Butterfly Blade" (with Shaun Turnbull, anthology, 2010)
  - X-Men: No More Humans (with Salvador Larroca, graphic novel, 128 pages, 2014, ISBN 0-7851-5402-7)
  - X-Men: Legacy #300 (co-written by Carey, Christos Gage and Simon Spurrier, art by Tan Eng Huat, Steve Kurth and Rafa Sandoval, 2014) collected in X-Force: Hide/Fear (tpb, 120 pages, 2015, ISBN 0-7851-9027-9)
- Legion of Monsters: Werewolf by Night: "Smalltown Girl" (with Greg Land, co-feature in one-shot, 2007) collected in Legion of Monsters (hc, 280 pages, 2007, ISBN 0-7851-2754-2)
- Ultimate Collection: Ender's Shadow (tpb, 256 pages, 2012, ISBN 0-7851-6338-7) collects:
  - Ender's Shadow: Battle School #1–5 (with Sebastian Fiumara, 2009) also collected as Ender's Shadow: Battle School (hc, 128 pages, 2009, ISBN 0-7851-3596-0)
  - Ender's Shadow: Command School #1–5 (with Sebastian Fiumara, 2009–2010) also collected as Ender's Shadow: Command School (hc, 128 pages, 2010, ISBN 0-7851-3598-7)
- The Torch #1–8 (script by Carey from a story by Carey, Alex Ross and Jim Krueger, art by Patrick Berkenkotter and Anthony Tan (#7–8), 2009–2010) collected as The Torch (tpb, 200 pages, 2010, ISBN 0-7851-4068-9)
- The Mystic Hands of Doctor Strange: "Duel in the Dark Dimension" (prose story with illustrations by Marcos Martín, anthology one-shot, 2010) collected in Doctor Strange: The Flight of Bones (tpb, 192 pages, 2016, ISBN 1-302-90167-2)
- Thor: Wolves of the North (with Mike Perkins, one-shot, 2011) collected in Thor: The Trial of Thor (tpb, 288 pages, 2017, ISBN 1-302-90795-6)
- Sigil vol. 2 #1–4 (with Leonard Kirk, CrossGen, 2011) collected as Sigil: Out of Time (tpb, 96 pages, 2011, ISBN 0-7851-5622-4)
- Miracleman #0: "Whisper in the Dark" (with Paul Davidson, co-feature, 2022)

==== Other publishers ====
- Compa(ñ)ero Leonardo: "El Genio Eterno de Leonardo" (with Victor Santos, anthology graphic novel, 120 pages, Semana Negra de Gijón, 2004)
  - The story was first published in English as "The Timeless Genius of Leonardo" (with new art by M. D. Penman) in Thought Bubble Anthology #1 (Image, 2011)
  - The English language version was subsequently collected by Image in Thought Bubble Anthology Collection (tpb, 136 pages, 2016, ISBN 1-5343-0067-8)
- 24-Minute Comic #1–2 (drawn by various artists over Carey-written couplets, self-published by Adrian Brown at UK Web & Mini Comix Thing, 2005–2006)
- Dynamite:
  - Red Sonja vol. 3 #0–6 (co-written by Carey and Michael Avon Oeming, art by Mel Rubi, 2005–2006)
    - Collected as Red Sonja: She-Devil with a Sword (hc, 200 pages, 2006, ISBN 1-933305-36-3; tpb, 2006, ISBN 1-933305-11-8)
    - Collected in Red Sonja Omnibus Volume 1 (tpb, 464 pages, 2010, ISBN 1-60690-101-X)
  - Barbarella (with Kenan Yarar, Jorge Fornés (#4 and 12) and Donny Hadiwidjaja (#8), 2017–2018) collected as:
    - Red Hot Gospel (collects #1–4, tpb, 128 pages, 2018, ISBN 1-5241-0752-2)
    - Hard Labor (collects #5–8, tpb, 160 pages, 2019, ISBN 1-5241-0836-7)
    - Burning Down the House (collects #9–12, tpb, 120 pages, 2019, ISBN 1-5241-1191-0)
- Vampirella: Revelations #0–3 (with Mike Lilly, Harris, 2005–2006)
  - Collected as Vampirella: Revelations (tpb, 88 pages, 2006, ISBN 0-910692-92-0)
  - Collected in Vampirella Masters Series Volume 8: Mike Carey (tpb, 88 pages, Dynamite, 2013, ISBN 1-60690-432-9)
- Virgin:
  - Voodoo Child #1–6 (script by Carey based on the concept by Nicolas Cage and his son Weston, art by Dean Hyrapiet, 2007) collected as Voodoo Child (hc, 144 pages, 2008, ISBN 0-9814808-0-2; tpb, 2008, ISBN 1-934413-13-5)
  - The Stranded #1–5 (with Sid Kotian, 2007–2008) collected as The Stranded (tpb, 144 pages, 2008, ISBN 1-934413-25-9)
  - Queen's Rook (with Edison George, 22-page webcomic published at Myspace, 2008)
- Negative Burn vol. 2 #14: "Red Shift" (with David Windett, anthology, Desperado Publishing, 2007)
- Image:
  - Liquid City Volume 1: "Face" (with Sonny Liew, anthology graphic novel, 312 pages, 2008, ISBN 1-60706-027-2)
  - Creepshow vol. 3 #4: "Flesh Wounds" (with Mark Torres, anthology, 2024) collected in Creepshow Volume 3 (tpb, 128 pages, 2025, ISBN 1-53438-592-4)
- Untouchable (co-written by Carey and Samit Basu, art by Ashok Bhadana, graphic novel, 56 pages, Liquid, 2010, ISBN 1-60690-226-1)
- Houses of the Holy #1–9 (with Dave Kendall, digital/motion comic, Madefire, 2013–2014)
- Boom! Studios:
  - Suicide Risk (with Elena Casagrande, Joëlle Jones (#5), Jorge Coelho (#10), Filipe Andrade (#14), Haemi Jang (#18) and Giorgia Sposito (#19–21, 25), 2013–2015) collected as:
    - Grudge War (collects #1–4, tpb, 128 pages, 2013, ISBN 1-60886-332-8)
    - Nightmare Scenario (collects #5–9, tpb, 160 pages, 2014, ISBN 1-60886-360-3)
    - Seven Walls and a Trap (collects #10–13, tpb, 128 pages, 2014, ISBN 1-60886-399-9)
    - Jericho (collects #14–17, tpb, 128 pages, 2015, ISBN 1-60886-461-8)
    - Scorched Earth (collects #18–21, tpb, 128 pages, 2015, ISBN 1-60886-721-8)
    - The Breaking of So Great a Thing (collects #22–25, tpb, 128 pages, 2016, ISBN 1-60886-814-1)
  - Rowans Ruin #1–4 (with Mike Perkins, 2015–2016) collected as Rowans Ruin (tpb, 112 pages, 2016, ISBN 1-60886-902-4)
- IDW Publishing:
  - Love is Love: "Triolet for Orlando" (poem illustrated by Craig Hamilton, anthology graphic novel, 144 pages, 2016, ISBN 1-63140-939-5)
  - Darkness Visible #1–6 (co-written by Carey and Arvind Ethan David, art by Brendan Cahill and Livio Ramondelli (#3 and 6), 2017) collected as Darkness Visible (tpb, 152 pages, 2017, ISBN 1-63140-979-4)
  - The Highest House #1–6: "Obsidian's Bargain" (with Peter Gross, 2018) collected as The Highest House (tpb, 188 pages, 2018, ISBN 1-68405-354-4)
  - Femme Magnifique: "Rosalind Franklin" (with Eugenia Koumaki, anthology graphic novel, 240 pages, 2018, ISBN 1-68405-320-X)
- Shock Volume 1: "Escape from the Lost World" (with Szymon Kudranski, anthology graphic novel, 160 pages, Aftershock, 2018, ISBN 1-935002-65-1)
- TechnoFreak vol. 2 #1: "The Baboushka Gambit" (with Tom Newell, co-feature, American Mythology, 2021)
- Bad Idea:
  - Orc Island #1: "Ark Story" (with Kano, co-feature, 2022)
  - Cul-de-sac #1–6 (with Jonathan Wayshak, 2025–2026)
- Comixology:
  - GhostBox #1–5 (with Pablo Raimondi, digital, 2024–2025) collected in print via Mad Cave Studios as GhostBox (tpb, 160 pages, 2025, ISBN 1-5458-2127-5)
  - The Lycan #1–6 (script by Carey based on the concept by Thomas Jane and David James Kelly, art by Diego Yapur, digital, 2025)
    - The series was initially announced in 2021, to be published by Aftershock with art by Sean O'Connor and Liam Sharp. As The Lycan it won the 2026 Harvey Award for Digital Book of the Year.
- Cruel Universe vol. 2 #8: "Clinical Trial" (with Daniel Gete, anthology, Oni Press, 2026) collected in Cruel Universe Volume 3 (tpb, 128 pages, 2026, ISBN 979-8894883649)

=== Poetry and short prose ===
==== Uncollected ====
Year	Title	Source	Publisher	Notes
2002	"In Thule with Jessica"	Xconnect: Writers of the Information Age Volume 5	CrossConnect	ISBN 0-9651450-4-2
2006	"Auszug"	Mike Carey's One-Sided Bargains	Desperado Publishing	Published with an illustration by Michael Gaydos
2009	"Now! and Then!"	Murky Depths #10	The House of Murky Depths	ISBN 1-906584-15-X
2016	"The Ornament"	O Horrid Night	FunDead	ISBN 0-9894726-3-9
2019	"There Were No Birds to Fly"	Wonderland: An Anthology	Titan Books	ISBN 1-78909-148-9
2020	"War Crimes"	London Centric: Tales of Future London	NewCon Press	ISBN 1-912950-73-1
2023	"Mr. Thirteen"	Twice Cursed: An Anthology	Titan Books	ISBN 1-80336-121-2
2024	"A Routine Investigation in Downtown Arcadia"	ParSec #9	PS Publishing	ISBN 1-803-94349-1
2026	"The Necessary Sword"	The Iron Code	NewCon Press	ISBN 1-917-73528-6

==== Collected ====
The Complete Short Stories of Mike Carey (PS Publishing, 2019, ISBN 1-78636-406-9)
Title	Year	Originally published in	Originally published by	Notes
"Iphigenia in Aulis"	2012	An Apple for the Creature	Ace Books	ISBN 0-425-25680-4
"Zuleika"	2012	The Steel Seraglio	ChiZine	ISBN 1-926851-53-6
"The Sons of Tammany"	2013	Beyond Rue Morgue	Titan Books	ISBN 1-78116-175-5
"We'll Always Have Paris"	2017	Dark Cities	Titan Books	ISBN 1-78565-579-5
"Second Wind"	2010	The New Dead	St. Martin's Griffin	ISBN 0-312-55971-2
"The Demon in the Well"	2014	The House of War and Witness	Gollancz	ISBN 0-575-13272-8
"My Life in Politics"	2018	Phantoms	Titan Books	ISBN 1-78565-794-1
"The Tale of Salt-Carrier Va"	2018	The Highest House	IDW Publishing	ISBN 1-68405-354-4
"The Non-Event"	2010	Masked	Gallery Books	ISBN 1-4391-6882-2
"In That Quiet Earth"	2017	Nights of the Living Dead	St. Martin's Griffin	ISBN 1-250-11224-9
"The Gold of Anwar Das"	2012	The Steel Seraglio	ChiZine	ISBN 1-926851-53-6
"Take Two"				Unpublished story commissioned by a national newspaper
"Face"	2008	Subterranean: Tales of Dark Fantasy	Subterranean Press	ISBN 1-59606-183-9; Also published as a short comic with art by Sonny Liew in Liquid City Volume 1 (Image, 2008, ISBN 1-60706-027-2)
"The Ordeal"	2014	The House of War and Witness	Gollancz	ISBN 0-575-13272-8
"Taproot"	2019	Ten-Word Tragedies	PS Publishing	ISBN 1-78636-430-1
"Reflections on the Critical Process"	2011	ChiZine #47	ChiZine	
"All That's Red Earth"				
"The Soldier"	2014	The House of War and Witness	Gollancz	ISBN 0-575-13272-8

=== Novels ===
Year	Title	Series	Publisher	ISBN	Notes
2006	The Devil You Know	Felix Castor	Orbit Books	1-84149-413-5 (Paperback, 480 pages)	
2006	Vicious Circle	Felix Castor	Orbit Books	1-84149-414-3 (Paperback, 512 pages)	
2007	Dead Men's Boots	Felix Castor	Orbit Books	1-84149-415-1 (Paperback, 544 pages)	
2009	Thicker Than Water	Felix Castor	Orbit Books	1-84149-656-1 (Paperback, 512 pages)	
2009	The Naming of the Beasts	Felix Castor	Orbit Books	1-84149-655-3 (Paperback, 512 pages)	
2011	The Dead Sea Deception	Heather Kennedy	Sphere Books	0-7515-4573-2 (Paperback, 400 pages)	Written under the pseudonym Adam Blake
2012	The Steel Seraglio		ChiZine	1-926851-53-6 (Paperback, 400 pages)	Co-written by Carey with his wife Linda and daughter Louise; Published as The City of Silk and Steel in the UK
2012	The Demon Code	Heather Kennedy	Sphere Books	0-7515-4578-3 (Paperback, 576 pages)	Written under the pseudonym Adam Blake
2014	The Girl with All the Gifts	The Hungry Plague	Orbit Books	0-356-50015-2 (Paperback, 512 pages)	Adapted into a film of the same name
2014	The House of War and Witness		Gollancz	0-575-13272-8 (Paperback, 528 pages)	Co-written by Carey with his wife Linda and daughter Louise
2016	Fellside		Orbit Books	0-356-50358-5 (Hardcover, 496 pages)	
2017	The Boy on the Bridge	The Hungry Plague	Orbit Books	0-356-50353-4 (Hardcover, 400 pages)	
2018	Someone Like Me		Orbit Books	0-356-50946-X (Hardcover, 512 pages)	
2020	The Book of Koli	Rampart Trilogy	Orbit Books	0-356-50955-9 (Paperback, 400 pages)	
2020	The Trials of Koli	Rampart Trilogy	Orbit Books	0-356-51349-1 (Paperback, 480 pages)	
2021	The Fall of Koli	Rampart Trilogy	Orbit Books	0-356-51350-5 (Paperback, 560 pages)	
2022	The Last Night at the Star Dome Lounge		PS Publishing	1-786-36871-4 (Hardcover, 96 pages)	
2023	Infinity Gate	The Pandominion	Orbit Books	0-316-50438-6 (Paperback, 544 pages)	
2023	The Ghost in Bone	Felix Castor	Subterranean Press	1-64524-133-5 (Hardcover, 144 pages)	
2024	Echo of Worlds	The Pandominion	Orbit Books	0-356-51805-1 (Hardcover, 496 pages)	
2025	Once Was Willem		Orbit Books	0-356-51944-9 (Hardcover, 304 pages)	Winner of the 2026 World Fantasy Award for Best Novel.
2025	Outlaw Planet	The Pandominion	Orbit Books	0-3565-2803-0 (Hardcover, 464 pages)	
2026	The Tinder Box		Orbit Books	0-356-52807-3 (Hardcover, 400 pages)	

Preceded by Brian Azzarello	Hellblazer writer 2002–2006	Succeeded by Denise Mina
Preceded by Louise Simonson	Red Sonja writer 2005–2006 (with Michael Avon Oeming)	Succeeded by Michael Avon Oeming
Preceded by Peter Milligan	X-Men: Legacy writer 2006–2011	Succeeded by Christos Gage
Preceded by Mark Millar	Ultimate Fantastic Four writer 2006–2008	Succeeded by Joe Pokaski
