= The Girl with All the Gifts =

2014 science fiction novel by Mike Carey

- Book cover from official website
- Author: M. R. Carey
- Language: English
- Genre: Dystopia; Post-apocalyptic
- Publisher: Orbit Books
- Publication date: June 2014
- Pages: 460
- ISBN: 978-0-356-50015-7
- Followed by: The Boy on the Bridge

The Girl with All the Gifts is a science fiction book by M. R. Carey, published in June 2014 by Orbit Books. It is based on his 2013 Edgar Award–nominated short story "Iphigenia in Aulis" and was written concurrently with the screenplay for the 2016 film. It deals with a post-apocalyptic future in which most of humanity is wiped out by a zombie-like fungal infection.

The title is a loose translation of "Pandora". The Pandora myth appears in the story in several different ways.

== Plot ==
Twenty years ago, humanity was infected by a variant of the fungus native to South America called Ophiocordyceps unilateralis, which led to the Breakdown – the end of civilization as it was before. The infected, referred to as "hungries", quickly lose their mental powers, occasionally keeping enough to be aware of their actions yet still unable to control them, and feed on the flesh of healthy humans. The disease spreads through blood and saliva, but can also spread airborne through spores created by the fungus. In England, the few surviving uninfected humans either live in heavily guarded areas such as Beacon, or roam in packs of hostile, scavenging "junkers".

The authorities in Beacon set up a remote military base for the study of a specific group of child hungries. They, unlike others, are able to retain their mental powers and only lose control when they get too close to human scent. The only way to hide the scent is to use a substance called e-blocker, which is in limited supply.

Soldiers, led by Sergeant Eddie Parks, find such child hungries and bring them to the base, Hotel Echo, which is 30 miles outside of London and 74 miles outside of Beacon. At the base, the children are educated by teachers and tested by the head scientist, Dr Caroline Caldwell. This often means she vivisects the children, which Helen Justineau, a behavioural psychologist and teacher at the base, dislikes. Justineau sees the child hungries as people, and is especially fond of Melanie, a 10-year-old with a genius-level IQ who loves Greek mythology. Melanie loves Justineau as a surrogate mother. Like the other children, Melanie does not understand that she is different from the adults.

Dr Caldwell, who believes that she is close to a cure for the fungus, chooses to dissect Melanie. As Justineau interrupts and tries to save her, the base is attacked by a group of junkers and hungries; Caldwell is badly wounded, and in saving Justineau, Melanie eats flesh for the first time. The three find Parks and Private Kieran Gallagher, and flee the base together. The group decides to travel to Beacon, 74 miles away, and argue over whether to bring Melanie. Parks only agrees after placing a muzzle and handcuffs on the child and making her ride on the roof of the tank. Melanie cooperates, now aware of the danger she poses to the others.

Melanie proves useful to the adults; hungries do not attack her and she can lead them away. While Caldwell still sees Melanie as a specimen, the others begin to trust the child. After several encounters with hungries, including a few adults that also retain some human-like behavior, the group finds the mobile laboratory Rosalind Franklin, which has state-of-art facilities for experimentation and attack, but disappeared on its research mission. Caldwell, who is dying from sepsis, uses its equipment to urgently continue her research.

While Melanie sates her hunger away from the others by eating wild animals, she finds a group of child hungries. Melanie sees that they, too, retain their mental functions, although they have no language of their own, being uneducated. Afraid that they will be experimented on, Melanie instead tells the adults she saw a large group of junkers, but reveals the truth to Justineau. Gallagher, scared of junkers, flees the lab. He is found by the intelligent hungries and eaten.

While Parks and Justineau search for Gallagher, Caldwell—obsessed with finishing her research before dying—captures one of the intelligent hungries and experiments on him. She makes remarkable findings but does not let the others inside, fearing that they will interfere. Melanie finds a giant mass of fungal fruiting bodies that have grown in the years since the infection began; while there are enough spores to infect the entire world by air currents, the pods that contain the spores (sporangia) do not open on their own.

Melanie tricks Caldwell into letting her inside. Before dying, Caldwell shares her findings with Melanie: There is no cure or vaccine for the fungus. Intelligent hungries are second-generation ones, conceived by hungries who retained some human behavior. Those born in this way retain their mental abilities.

Outside the lab, Parks and Justineau are cornered by hungries. Melanie frightens them away, but Justineau is knocked unconscious and Parks is bitten and infected. Parks asks Melanie to shoot him before the infection cycle finishes so he does not turn into a hungry; she agrees to do so. She asks him to shoot the mass of spores with a flamethrower, deducing correctly that the environmental trigger to open the spores is fire. Melanie explains before she kills Parks that as long as there are healthy humans, the war between them and the hungries will continue. For second-generation hungries to be born and rebuild the world, every human must first be infected.

Justineau awakens in the Rosalind Franklin. Melanie leads her to a group of intelligent hungries, to whom Justineau, wearing an environmental protection suit, starts teaching the alphabet.

== Characters ==
- Melanie – test subject number one, a host of the Ophiocordyceps unilateralis fungal infection. She has a brilliant intellect. She is 10 years old.
- Miss Helen Justineau – a compassionate teacher with a psychology background, who has become attached to the child subjects of the military-run experiment at Hotel Echo.
- Sergeant Eddie Parks – a battle-hardened, non-commissioned officer who is acting as field commander of the Hotel Echo military complex.
- Dr Caroline Caldwell – the scientific leader of the study taking place at Hotel Echo. She is the teachers' boss. She is obsessed with finding the cure to the disease.
- Private Kieran Gallagher – a young soldier at Hotel Echo who was born after the Breakdown.
- Mr Whitaker – the only male teacher at Hotel Echo.
- Dr Jean Selkirk – a teacher at Hotel Echo, and Dr Caldwell's surgical assistant.
- Miss Mailer – a teacher at Hotel Echo.
- "Hungry" children: Anne, Kenny, Ronnie, Lizzie, John, Steven, Miles, Zoe, Xanthi, Marcia, Liam, Siobhan, Tom, Joanne, Andrew, Gary.

== Reception ==
The Girl with All the Gifts received acclaim from critics, who praised its variation from typical zombie fiction as well as the depth of its characters. Torie Bosch of Slate called it a "crossover horror at its best" and wrote: "It's a welcome shift from the focus of many zombie stories ... The Girl With All the Gifts turns eating brains from the usual empty-calorie snack into a full, complex, palate-challenging meal." Writing for The Guardian, James Smythe praised the book as being "original, thrilling and powerful" and wrote: "Were the characters not so strong, the book might fall apart. The plot is rather slight, and the ending feels a little rushed; but the characters are so well drawn and so human that it's impossible not to feel for them." Miles of Entertainment Weekly concurred, writing: "The character at the story's heart may have no pulse, but Melanie is empathetic and sympathetic, and her deeply tragic existence is proof that zombie tales can elicit an emotion other than fear." While NPR's Genevieve Valentine was critical of the protagonist's narrative, which "veer[ed] occasionally and abruptly in one direction or the other", she still found the book to be "grotesque and grimly hopeful by turns, underscored by lovingly detailed infection in both metaphorical and very literal terms: Spores and hopelessness are equally contagious."

== Film adaptation ==
Not long after the book's release, M. R. Carey announced that the book would be made into a movie, and that the movie's title would differ from the book; it was announced as She Who Brings Gifts. The title was changed in June 2016 to match the book.

Filming began in May 2015, with newcomer Sennia Nanua in the lead role of Melanie, Gemma Arterton as Helen Justineau, Glenn Close as Caroline Caldwell, and Paddy Considine as Sergeant Parks. TV veteran Colm McCarthy directed the movie. It is McCarthy's second feature-length film. The film's screenplay was adapted by the author. Portions of the film were shot on location at the former RAF Upper Heyford site in the former Quick Reaction Alert (QRA) areas and the Northern Bomb stores. Mike Carey was included as a "hungry" in the background of the scenes during Melanie's escape from the facility. The film, with its title changed back to match the novel, was released on Friday 23 September 2016.

== Prequel ==
In 2017, Carey published a prequel novel entitled The Boy on the Bridge about a team of scientists and soldiers on a mission to find a cure for the fungal infection, which starts some time before The Girl with All the Gifts.

== See also ==
- The Last of Us
- Severance (novel)
