= List of The Sandman spinoffs =

After the DC comic book series The Sandman concluded with #75, numerous comics, novels and spin-offs made use of its characters, concepts and universe. The Sandman was written by Neil Gaiman.

== Ongoing series ==
=== The Dreaming ===
The Dreaming was a monthly title inspired by Neil Gaiman's Sandman that ran for 60 issues (with one special, "Trial and Error") from June 1996 to May 2001. The comic is set predominantly in Dream's realm "The Dreaming".

=== Lucifer ===
Lucifer was a monthly title written by Mike Carey, which began in June 2000 and ended with issue 75 in June 2006. The comic focused on the character of Lucifer (picking up after the end of the "Season of Mists" storyline) and had started as a Sandman Presents mini-series.

=== Sandman Mystery Theatre ===
Sandman Mystery Theatre was a monthly title written by Matt Wagner and Steven T. Seagle featuring the Golden-Age Sandman Wesley Dodds in a film-noir-esque setting published by Vertigo for 70 issues between 1993 and 1999 as a direct result of Neil Gaiman's landmark series.

=== Dead Boy Detectives ===
Dead Boy Detectives was a monthly title by Toby Litt and Mark Buckingham that followed the adventures of Charles Rowland and Edwin Paine, the Dead Boy Detectives, two dead schoolboys who travel the world solving mysteries. Spun off "From the Pages of the Sandman", the title launched in December 2013.

== Mini-series and one-shots ==
=== Mini-Series ===
- Death: The High Cost of Living (1993), the first of two Gaiman-penned three-issue mini-series starring Morpheus' elder sister and characters from A Game of You. Once every one hundred years Death spends a day in mortal form.
- WitchCraft (1994), a three-issue mini-series featuring The Three Witches (also The Fates) from Neil Gaiman's Sandman.
- Death: The Time of Your Life (1996), scripted by Gaiman, features Hazel and Foxglove, also from A Game of You.
- WitchCraft: La Terreur (1998), a second three-issue mini-series featuring The Three Witches.
- The Girl Who Would Be Death (1999), a four-issue mini-series.
- The Sandman: The Dream Hunters (1999), A four-issue mini-series by P. Craig Russell, adapting Gaiman's prose novel into comic book format.
- Destiny: A Chronicle of Deaths Foretold (2000), a three-issue mini-series featuring Destiny of The Endless, his book, and a post-apocalyptic world. Written by Alisa Kwitney and with art by Kent Williams, Michael Zulli, Scott Hampton and Rebecca Guay.
- The Sandman: Overture (2013), a prequel mini-series by Neil Gaiman and J.H. Williams III of events that occurred immediately before Dream's incarceration in The Sandman #1. Special editions were released approximately a month after the original editions, which contain interviews with the creative team, alongside rare artwork.

=== Specials and one-shots ===
- Sandman Special: The Song of Orpheus (1991), a Sandman Special which retells the Greek Orpheus myth, placing it within the Sandman Universe with Dream as Orpheus' father.
- Vertigo Preview (1992/93) featured the seven-page short story A Fear of Falling by Gaiman and Kent Williams.
- Vertigo Jam (1993) featured an eight-page short story The Castle by Gaiman and Kevin Nowlan.
- The Children's Crusade (1993/94), a two-part bookend mini-series to Vertigo's crossover event starring Charles Rowland and Edwin Paine, the Dead Boy Detectives, which ran through the annuals of the then-Vertigo titles Black Orchid, Animal Man, Swamp Thing, Doom Patrol and The Books of Magic.
- Sandman Midnight Theatre (1995), a Prestige Format Sandman Mystery Theatre Special in which Wesley Dodds, the Golden Age Sandman, meets Lord Morpheus of The Endless, the Modern Age Sandman.
- Vertigo Visions: Prez (1995), a one-shot featuring the old DC comic book character Prez (a teenager who becomes President), prompted by the revival and re-interpretation of the character by Neil Gaiman in his Sandman series.
- Vertigo: Winter's Edge (1997) featured a 10-page Desire story by Gaiman and John Bolton, named The Flowers of Romance. The same issue also features a short story set in The Dreaming, by The Dreaming team of Caitlin R. Kiernan & Peter Hogan with Duncan Fegredo.
- Vertigo: Winter's Edge 2 (1998) featured a six-page Death story by Gaiman and Jeff Jones. The same issue also features a story by Caitlin R. Kiernan with Teddy Kristiansen.
- Vertigo: Winter's Edge #3 (1999) featured a nine-page Desire story by Gaiman and Michael Zulli. The same issue also features a story of The Dreaming with Caitlin R. Kiernan script and art by Shawn McManus, and an interview for The Witching Hour with Jeph Loeb and Chris Bachalo.

=== The Sandman Presents ===
Initially The Dreaming, the first ongoing spin-off of The Sandman, served as anthology series telling mostly unconnected tales of various Sandman-related characters. When it was decided that The Dreaming would be retooled into a more focused series with an ongoing storyline, it was decided that another outlet would be created to continue to tell anthology style stories. Therefore, between 1999 and 2004, a meta-series of mini-series and one-shots were published under the banner of "The Sandman Presents", telling tales of various supporting characters related to The Sandman franchise.

- Sandman Presents: Lucifer – The Morningstar Option (three issue mini-series, March–May 1999), in which Lucifer (having retired from Hell to run his jazz club Lux) is approached by an angel who requests that he perform a service for heaven, one which the angels themselves cannot do, and for which he will be handsomely paid. Authors: Mike Carey, Scott Hampton. This was followed by the ongoing Lucifer series.
- Sandman Presents: Love Street (three issue mini-series, July–September 1999), a run-away named Olli is befriended by none other than a young John Constantine, and with him enters into a world of the occult. At the same time the inhabitants of the Dreaming search for their vanished master. Authors: Peter Hogan, Michael Zulli, Vince Locke
- Sandman Presents: Merv Pumpkinhead, Agent of D.R.E.A.M. (one-shot, 2000), a renegade dream breaks into Morpheus' palace and steals some of the dream sand from his pouch. Pumpkin-headed servant Merv, ever-willing to play the secret agent, volunteers to track the dream down and bring the sand back.
- Sandman Presents: Petrefax (four issue mini-series, March–June 2000), follows the undertaker Petrefax first introduced during The Sandman "World's End" plot arc. Authors: Mike Carey, Steve Leialoha.
- Sandman Presents: The Dead Boy Detectives (four issue mini-series, August–November 2001), the two deceased school boys who cheated death during the Sandman Season of Mists arc, continue their adventures.
- Sandman Presents: The Corinthian – Death in Venice (three issue mini-series, December 2001 – Feb 2002), the story follows the Corinthian as he arrives in Venice shortly after leaving The Dreaming during Lord Morpheus' long absence. Authors: Darko Macan, Danijel Zezelj.
- Sandman Presents: Everything You Always Wanted to Know About Dreams... But Were Afraid to Ask (one-shot, July 2001), a collection of short stories answering questions abouts dreams and The Dreaming.
- Sandman Presents: The Furies (one-shot, 2002), a former victim of The Furies approaches Lyta Hall (used by them as a vessel through which to destroy Dream of The Endless) to help in his revenge.
- Sandman Presents: Thessaliad (four issue mini-series, March–June 2002), featuring Thessaly, former lover of Dream, and last of the Thessalian witches.
- Sandman Presents: Bast: Eternity Game (three issue mini-series, March–May 2003), in which the Egyptian cat goddess Bast, dying and neglected, attempts a great comeback. Authors: Caitlin R. Kiernan, Joe Bennett.
- Sandman Presents: Thessaly – Witch for Hire (four issue mini-series, April–July 2004), in which Thessaly (from the Sandman storyline A Game of You), the most deadly of the Thessalian witches is pitched against Cupid and a host of supporting monsters. Authors: Bill Willingham, Shawn McManus

== Artwork collections ==
- A Death Gallery, a collection of artwork depicting Death.
- The Sandman: A Gallery of Dreams, a collection of artwork depicting Dream.
- The Endless Gallery, a collection of artwork depicting The Endless.
- The Vertigo Gallery: Dreams and Nightmares (1995), a collection of artwork depicting characters from the Vertigo Universe (including Dream, Death and The Three Witches).

== Graphic novels ==
- The Little Endless Storybook (2001): a graphic novel which depicts The Endless as toddlers and follows a tiny Delirium as she attempts to find her dog Barnabas, written and illustrated by Jill Thompson.
- The Sandman: Endless Nights (2003): a graphic novel with one story for each of The Endless. They are set throughout history but two take place after the final events of the monthly series. Written by Neil Gaiman and featuring a different artist for each story, it topped The New York Times Best Seller list.
- Death: At Death's Door (2004): a manga-style graphic novel, written and illustrated by Jill Thompson, showcasing Death's activities during Season of Mists. This may be part of a series of manga novels starring Death.
- Dead Boy Detectives (2005): a manga-style graphic novel, written and illustrated by Jill Thompson and spin-off/sequel to Death: At Death’s Door.
- God Save the Queen (2007), written by Mike Carey, illustrated by John Bolton (graphic novel, 2007)
- Delirium's Party: A Little Endless Storybook (2011): a follow-up to The Little Endless Storybook, also written and illustrated by Jill Thompson.

== Prose works ==
- The Sandman: Book of Dreams (1996), a collection of prose short stories featuring the world of The Sandman in some way. It contains work from some notable contributors, among them Caitlin R. Kiernan, Tad Williams, Gene Wolfe, Tori Amos and Colin Greenland. Publisher DC Comics allegedly imposed restrictive terms on contributing authors, leading to a few authors withdrawing their stories.
- The Sandman: The Dream Hunters (1999): a prose novel that incorporates a so-called Japanese folk tale into the Sandman mythos, written by Gaiman and featuring illustrations by Yoshitaka Amano. It is not actually based on any existing Japanese folklore, but rather incorporates elements of Chinese and Japanese folklore and mythology into a new myth.

== Unreleased works ==
- The Sandman Presents: Marquee Moon (One-shot, 1997), a one-shot comic-book written by Peter Hogan, author of The Sandman Presents: Love Street. The first intended story arc in the Sandman Presents series, Marquee Moon would have taken place in 1977, featuring the mother of a werewolf character from The Sandman, as well as John Constantine from Hellblazer. It would also have featured the comic-book debut of The Clash. For reasons never made public, Vertigo opted not to publish the story after it had already been written, fully illustrated and solicited. Therefore, in 2007, Hogan allowed Rich Handley, owner of the Web site Roots of the Swamp Thing, to post the script and complete artwork online, though as of 2014 this website is offline.

== See also ==
- Characters of The Sandman
