= The Girl with All the Gifts (film) =

2016 British adventure film

- Theatrical release poster
- Directed by: Colm McCarthy
- Written by: Mike Carey
- Based on: The Girl with All the Gifts by Mike Carey
- Produced by: Camille Gatin; Angus Lamont
- Starring: Gemma Arterton; Paddy Considine; Glenn Close; Sennia Nanua
- Cinematography: Simon Dennis
- Edited by: Matthew Cannings
- Music by: Cristobal Tapia de Veer
- Production companies: BFI; Creative England; Altitude Film Entertainment; Poison Chef
- Distributed by: Warner Bros. Pictures
- Release dates: 3 August 2016 (Locarno Film Festival); 23 September 2016 (United Kingdom)
- Running time: 111 minutes
- Country: United Kingdom
- Language: English
- Box office: $4 million

The Girl with All the Gifts is a 2016 British post-apocalyptic adventure film directed by Colm McCarthy and written by Mike Carey. The film is based on the book of the same name by Carey. Starring Gemma Arterton, Paddy Considine, Glenn Close, and Sennia Nanua, the film depicts a dystopian future following a breakdown of society after most of humanity is wiped out by a fungal infection. The plot focuses on the struggle of a scientist, a teacher, and two soldiers who embark on a journey of survival with a special young girl named Melanie.

== Plot ==
In the near future, humanity has been ravaged by a disease caused by a parasitic fungus transmitted by bodily fluids. Over the prior decade, most of humanity that was infected turned into fast mindless zombies called "hungries". The only remaining hope is a cure that could be obtained from research on a small group of carrier, but apparently normal, children.

The children are imprisoned by a group of soldiers (led by Sergeant Eddie Parks), and go to school at an army base in the Home Counties, where they are experimented on by Dr. Caroline Caldwell. Helen Justineau is responsible for educating and studying the children. Among them is an exceptional girl named Melanie, whom Justineau grows particularly close to, thus forming a special bond.

When Melanie is about to be dissected, the base is overrun by hungries and the operating lab is breached. Melanie escapes and wanders outside, where soldiers are being violently attacked. Melanie and Justineau board an escaping truck with an injured Caldwell, Sergeant Parks, and two surviving soldiers, Gallagher and Dillon. Melanie is restrained and muzzled to prevent her from biting the others. Dillon is killed when hungries attack as the group stops for water, and the truck is disabled when a fuel line is broken.

The group reaches London by foot and makes their way through a swarm of dormant hungries using a "blocker" gel that masks their scent, rendering them largely invisible. They take shelter in an abandoned hospital for the night. Caldwell reveals to Melanie that second-generation hungries, or neonates, were discovered after babies killed their infected mothers by eating organs to get out of the womb, and while they crave living flesh, they still think and learn, as the fungus has a symbiotic relationship with those born infected.

In the morning, the group realises they have been surrounded by hungries. Melanie, as a second-generation hungry, is ignored by them and therefore goes to explore abandoned houses, eating a stray cat during her time out. She helps the group by leading the hungries away with a stray dog so the group can escape.

As they progress through London, they come across piles of infected bodies encircling the BT Tower, which has been overgrown by a massive fungal growth. Caldwell explains that the growth contains pods which, upon maturity, could release airborne spores that would end humankind. They take shelter in an abandoned mobile laboratory that was sent into the city earlier by the military authorities.

Caldwell, injured and dying of sepsis, reasons that she can save the human race by sacrificing Melanie to complete her vaccine research in the lab. As the group runs out of food, Gallagher ventures into the city on a supply run, but is killed by a tribe of feral hungry children who have learned to trick uninfected people with a trail of food cans. When Parks and Justineau are surrounded by the feral children, Melanie fights and handcuffs the leader and kills him with a bat. The remaining children back off, allowing the group to escape.

Caldwell attempts to dissect Melanie upon the group's return to the lab, imploring her to sacrifice herself for Justineau. Melanie comes to the realisation that she is not an experiment and that her kind, human-zombie hybrids, will be the future of the world. She escapes and sets the towering pod structure alight, causing it to release an immense cloud of spores. Caldwell chases after her, but is killed by the tribe of children.

Parks leaves the lab in search of Melanie, but becomes infected by the spores. He hands Melanie his gun and tearfully asks her to shoot him, as he does not want to turn into a hungry. Melanie obliges and shoots Parks as he is about to turn. In the lab, Justineau stands inside the sealed door, watching the spores fall.

The film ends with a tearful Justineau, safe but confined to the sealed mobile lab due to the lethal spore-filled air. Outside, the hybrid children of the army base, along with the feral children, sit together, kept sternly in place by Melanie. Justineau speaks through a microphone, educating the newly-dominant human-zombie species.

== Cast ==
- Gemma Arterton as Helen Justineau: A teacher who teaches the infected hybrids
- Paddy Considine as Sergeant Eddie Parks: The strict, no-nonsense head of security at the army base
- Glenn Close as Caroline Caldwell: A doctor trying to find a cure for the fungal infection
- Sennia Nanua as Melanie: A neonate who has the ability to suppress the hunger to a certain degree
- Anamaria Marinca as Jean Selkirk
- Fisayo Akinade as Private Kieran Gallagher: One of the soldiers stationed at the base, who manages to escape the base
- Anthony Welsh as Private Dillon: One of the soldiers stationed at the base, who manages to escape the base
- Dominique Tipper as Private Devani: one of the soldiers stationed at the base.

== Production ==
The book and film were re-written in tandem, with Carey also writing the screenplay. Colm McCarthy came aboard as director for his first major feature. The movie was originally titled She Who Brings Gifts but was later retitled, matching the book. The title is a reference to the ancient Greek legend of Pandora the gift-giver, which is also referenced in the book by the character of Helen Justineau being a classics teacher.

On 23 March 2015, casting was announced for the film. Of whether or not the film would be similar to the novel, Carey stated:

We went a slightly different way in the movie, especially when it came to point of view. Where the novel moves between the five main characters and lets us see what's going on in all of their heads, the movie sticks with Melanie all the way. And there are no Junkers in the movie. The base falls to a hungry attack. But it's a case of two different paths through the same narrative space. The ending is absolutely faithful to the book.

Half of the film's £4 million budget came from the BFI Film Fund and Creative England, making it the biggest investment that the latter had ever made and one of the largest ever for the BFI.

=== Filming ===
Principal photography began on 17 May 2015 in The West Midlands, taking place in Birmingham city centre, Cannock Chase, Dudley and Stoke-on-Trent. Filming lasted seven weeks. Aerial views of a deserted London were filmed with drones in the abandoned Ukrainian town of Pripyat, which has been uninhabited since the 1986 Chernobyl disaster.

=== Release ===
Warner Bros. acquired British distribution rights, while the film was in the United States by Saban Films.

== Reception ==
On the review aggregator website Rotten Tomatoes, 86% of 132 critics' reviews are positive, with an average rating of 7.2/10. The website's consensus reads: "The Girl with All the Gifts grapples with thought-provoking questions without skimping on the scares—and finds a few fresh wrinkles in the well-worn zombie horror genre along the way." Metacritic, which uses a weighted average, assigned the film a score of 67 out of 100, based on 20 critics, indicating "generally favorable" reviews.

Dave Robinson of Crash Landed described the film as a "tense and intriguing experience" noting that whilst its final act "goes a little off the reservation" the performance of lead Sennia Nanua will "make you both care [for her] and simultaneously feel on edge" along with the "smart choices" in the CGI department to create a "grounded feel", making comparisons to 28 Days Later.
