= Dead Men's Boots =

Novel by Mike Carey

- Author: Mike Carey
- Language: English
- Publisher: Orbit Books
- Publication date: 2007

Dead Men's Boots is a 2007 urban fantasy novel by Mike Carey. The third in his series about freelance exorcist Felix Castor, it was first published by Orbit Books.

== Synopsis ==
While investigating the apparent suicide of a colleague, Felix Castor is hired to prove the innocence of a man charged with a murder which he is blaming on a serial killer executed decades earlier.

== Reception ==
Kirkus Reviews lauded the novel as "irresistible" and an "extravaganza" with "prose [that] leaves the reader breathless." Publishers Weekly praised Carey's "gift for creating a plausible alternate reality" and his "way with words", comparing him to Jim Butcher. The SF Site, reviewing the audiobook, similarly compared Carey to Butcher, and noted that the story is "well leavened throughout with dry humor", emphasizing that although the novel is part three in a series, "readers can easily start the series here".
