= Stephen Murphy (comics) =

American comic book writer and editor

- Areas: Writer, Editor, Letterer
- Pseudonyms: Dean Clarrain; J.D. Vollman
- Notable works: The Puma Blues; Teenage Mutant Ninja Turtles Adventures; Tales of the TMNT
- Collaborators: Michael Zulli; Ryan Brown; Mike Hawthorne; Chris Allan

Stephen Murphy is an American comic book writer and editor known for his work on the Teenage Mutant Ninja Turtles series. With Michael Zulli, he was co-creator of the critically acclaimed 1980s independent comic The Puma Blues.

== Education ==
Murphy graduated from the University of Massachusetts Amherst with a BA in Communication Studies.

== Career ==
Murphy wrote The Puma Blues, which ran from 1986 to 1989, first published by Aardvark One International and later by Mirage Studios.

In 1988, Murphy was an initial signatory of the Creator's Bill of Rights.

Murphy's relationship with Mirage (operated by TMNT creators Kevin Eastman and Peter Laird) led to him coming on as a staff member at the studio, where he eventually became Managing Editor and Creative Director.

Alongside fellow Mirage staffer Ryan Brown, the two men revamped the Teenage Mutant Ninja Turtles Adventures title for Archie Comics, beginning in 1989 with issue #5. In their hands the comic immediately diverged from the cartoon series into unique new story arcs, often incorporating social, environmentalist, and animal rights themes. It also introduced several new characters of various races and backgrounds, including humans, mutants, aliens, and other anthropomorphic creatures. The stories were often seen as "deeper" and more "serious" than the cartoon. During that period, Murphy co-created the characters Jagwar, Nova Posse, Snake-Eyes, and Sarnath; he united several of the series' recurring characters as a separate team, the Mighty Mutanimals. Murphy wrote the majority of his work on TMNT Adventures under the name "Dean Clarrain."

Murphy (as "Dean Clarrain") also contributed to the Teenage Mutant Ninja Turtles comic strip, which ran from 1990 to 1997.

Murphy was a founding grant committee member of the Xeric Foundation from 1992 to 2006. Established by TMNT co-founder Peter Laird, the Xeric Foundation awarded self-publishing grants to comic book creators for 20 years until it shifted its mission.

Murphy was a staff writer on the 2003 TMNT animated series. He has also written many children's books for the new series.

Under Murphy's direction, a relaunch of Tales of the Teenage Mutant Ninja Turtles began publication in January 2004. The new Tales of the TMNT focused on events that occur throughout the Turtles' lives, including some of the "lost" fifteen years occurring between TMNT Volumes 2 and 4. This revived title maintained the tradition of including a "Let me tell you a story" frontispiece at the beginning of every issue, in homage to its 1980s predecessor. In May 2010, the second volume ended its run with a total of 70 issues, ten times as many as its predecessor. Murphy would again occasionally reuse the pen name "Dean Clarrain" when collaborating on Tales of the TMNT issues with artist Chris Allan, who had previously illustrated issues of Teenage Mutant Ninja Turtles Adventures that "Dean Clarrain" had written.

In 2006, Murphy wrote the hard-boiled detective limited series Umbra, illustrated by Mike Hawthorne and published by Image Comics. Murphy was nominated for a 2007 Harvey Award for Best Writer for Umbra, and the series was a 2007 Harvey nominee for Best Continuing or Limited Series.
