= Arcanum (comics) =

American comic book

Cover of the first issue

Arcanum was an American comic book published by Image Comics in 1996, under the Top Cow banner. The series was created by artist Brandon Peterson, in what was his first attempt at writing a series. It was vaguely a fantasy title, relying heavily on magical themes that were similar to other series Top Cow was publishing at the time. Peterson kept the title going for eight issues plus a 1/2 issue published by Wizard Entertainment, but the series was cancelled by Top Cow. Peterson wrapped up all plotlines in the final issue.
