= Creatures of the Night (comics) =

2004 graphic novel by Neil Gaiman

- Author: Neil Gaiman
- Language: English
- Genre: Graphic novel & fantasy
- Publisher: Dark Horse Comics
- Publication date: 2004
- Publication place: United States
- Media type: Print trade paperback
- ISBN: 1-56971-936-5 (US-paperback)
- OCLC: 57454758

Creatures of the Night is a graphic novel by Neil Gaiman which reprints two different short stories ("The Price" and "Daughter of Owls") from his collection Smoke and Mirrors with elaborate illustrations by artist Michael Zulli.

== Stories ==
In "The Price" a middle-aged writer living with his family in rural England adopts a stray black cat. Every night the cat shows signs of desperate combat resulting in serious wounds. During a four-day period during which the cat is confined to the basement to aid its recovery, the writer experiences several harsh misfortunes which are suddenly resolved when he allows the cat to leave. When the writer stays up one night to see who is fighting the cat, he sees a demonic, shapeshifting creature he believes to be the Devil approach his home, only to be driven off at great cost by the black cat. The story ends with the writer "selfishly" wondering how long the cat can keep defending his home and family.

"Daughter of Owls" takes place in some 17th-century English village, with a framing device set in Victorian or early Edwardian times. An infant foundling girl is discovered with owl feathers in her basket and an owl pellet clutched in one hand. The women of the village believe her to be a witch or other supernatural creature of evil and suggest that she be put to death. However, the elder men of the village give her instead to a former nun living in a ruined convent. The girl grows up as a feral child—because no human voice ever speaks to her—and when she matures, rumors of her beauty inspire the men of the village to visit and rape her one night. What happens to the men is not shown, but the women of the village dream that night of being transformed into mice and being attacked by owls. When they investigate the convent, the men are nowhere to be found, but there are owl pellets containing hair, bones, coins, and buckles.

== Credits ==
Written by Neil Gaiman

Art by: Michael Zulli
