= Teenage Mutant Ninja Turtles (comic strip) =

American comic strip published 1990–1997

- Current status/schedule: Cancelled
- Launch date: December 10, 1990
- End date: January 1997
- Publisher: Creator's Syndicate
- Genre(s): Action-adventure, superhero, humor

The Teenage Mutant Ninja Turtles comic strip was started on December 10, 1990, by Creator's Syndicate as a daily. The comic strip ceased publication in January 1997.

The strip ran seven days a week, but (at least for part of its run) the Saturday strips consisted only of fan art and were not part of the storyline, which was published Monday through Friday. The Sunday edition featured a mix of puzzles and fan art early on, but later switched entirely to a fan-art format.

Among the creators who worked on the strip were Ryan Brown, Dan Berger, Jim Lawson, Michael Dooney, Steve Lavigne and Dean Clarrain.

Some of the daily strips have been reprinted in Comics Revue issues #58-82.
