= Sandman Presents: Petrefax =

- Publisher: Vertigo
- Publication date: March 2000 - June 2000
- Genre: Fantasy
- Title(s): Sandman Presents: Petrefax #1-4
- Main character(s): Petrefax

Creative team
- Writer(s): Mike Carey
- Artist(s): Steve Leialoha
- Letterer(s): Comicraft
- Colorist(s): Bjarne Hansen
- Editor(s): Joan Hilty

Sandman Presents: Petrefax is a comic miniseries, dealing with the adventure of Petrefax, a former Prentice from the Necropolis Litharge, now a Journeyman, in the land of Malegrise, where everyone is potentially a sorcerer. He encounters Lady Calcinia, who wishes not to marry Lord Bulgus, a powerful member of the Consistory, a court of sorcerers.

== Plot ==
Petrefax enters the land of Malegrise and encounters a rude servant of Lord Bulgus. Calcinia quarrels with her parents over her refusal to marry Bulgus. She uses Gypsy magic to discover that Bulgus killed his brother and nephew to obtain his post. He discovers her spying and rends her soul in two, turning her into an undead. Petrefax is contracted to bury her, but she asks him to help her bring her murderer to justice.

He attempts to bury a weighted casket but is found out. Raven saves him from hanging and Calcina escapes in the confusion. Raven's mother Ishmir, an old gypsy woman, bargains with some ifrits to learn that Bulgus' accomplice, the Wizard Quonce, whom Calcinia seeks, is not far away. The three leave, just before Bulgus' men, alerted by his scrying of her location, arrive to destroy the camp. Petrefax is separated from the two when Bulgus destroys the bridge they are crossing, by magic.

On his way to Ashwok, Petrefax encounters Sieur Jumello, mayor of Askwok. Bulgus tries again to destroy Calcinia but is saved by Raven. Calcinia, believing Petrefax dead, decides to travel to Ascandalus, the seat of the Consistory, and plead her case. Jumello contracts Petrefax to arrange a burial, in exchange for an introduction to Quonce. Bulgus commands Bal Cyphyro to find and burn Petrefax. Calcinia and Raven are set upon by bandits but make quick work of them. Calcinia arrives in Ascandalus, but is stalled by the levels of bureaucracy. Petrefax discovers that Quonce and the burial are the same, having expired six days ago, but not before having grown 8 feet tall, due to an overdose of thaumatropic drugs that Quonce was addicted to.

Frustrated, Calcinia takes matters into her own hands. Petrefax scours Quonce's journal while supervising the burial of the corpse. He discovers that because Quonce could not touch Bulgus' nephew, he swapped him with a dead, changed goat. Bal Cyphyro arrives and inadvertently cremates Quonce's corpse. Calcinia breaches the doors on the Consistory with a wagonload of burning brandy barrels. Bal Cyphyro, convinced by Quonce's journal, carries Petrefax to the Consistory. Calcinia pleads her case, accusing Lord Bulgus, just as Bal Cyphyro and Petrefax arrive, to request a trial by combat, with Raven as her champion. Bulgus attempts to kill Raven by magic, and his attack rebounds, destroying him. Raven is revealed as Jonathan Bulgus, the true heir. Bal Cyphyro restores Cancinia to life. Though Petrefax and Jonathan vie for Cancinia's hand, she chooses to study law with Bal Cyphyro, as his apprentice.

== Cast ==
- Petrefax - Journeyman undertaker
- Calcinia Smith - heiress
- Raven - a gypsy
- Lord Bulgus (Phrax Leopold) - a power hungry sorcerer
- Bal Cyphyro - demon, hereditary estate manager and solicitor for the Lords Bulgus
- Quonce - a wizard, hired by Bulgus
- Malachi- Bulgus' brother
