= Crossing Midnight =

Horror book series

- Cover to Crossing Midnight #1, art by J. H. Williams III.

Publication information
- Publisher: Vertigo
- Schedule: Monthly
- Format: Ongoing series
- Genre: Dark fantasy
- Publication date: January 2007 – July 2008
- No. of issues: 19
- Main character(s): Kai; Toshi

Creative team
- Created by: Mike Carey; Jim Fern
- Written by: Mike Carey
- Artist(s): Jim Fern; Eric Nguyen

Collected editions
- Cut Here: ISBN 1-4012-1341-3
- A Map of Midnight: ISBN 1-40121-645-5
- The Blade in the Soul: ISBN 1-40121-966-7

Crossing Midnight is an American horror/fantasy comic book series set in contemporary Japan. It was written by Mike Carey and illustrated by Jim Fern and Eric Nguyen, with covers by J. H. Williams III. Vertigo, a DC Comics imprint, published the series. Due to poor sales, the series concluded after 19 issues.

Carey has said the series was born out of his love for Japanese and Korean films, such as My Beautiful Girl, Mari, and horror manga by creators such as Junji Ito, Hideshi Hino, and Shigeru Mizuki. Carey's version, however, is still intrinsically western. It is, he says, "Hans Christian Andersen's The Snow Queen set in Nagasaki".

== Plot ==
Note: The following synopsis broadly covers the events of the first four issues.

Nagasaki twins Kai and Toshi are born either side of midnight, an unexpected result of their father's frivolous prayer at their grandmother's shrine. As they grow up, Toshi becomes seemingly invulnerable to harm; a fall onto railings as a child causes the spikes to bend while she walks away unscathed. Kai himself proves impossible to injure with a knife. Another strange event affects them years later, when they and a childhood friend, Saburo, find themselves entering a magical fantasy world through the Sannō Shrine. When Kai spots a strange man stalking them, the twins run back to the real world, accidentally trapping their friend behind them. Still later, as teenagers, they find themselves once more confronted by the man from the fantasy land. He is Aratsu, a god of swords, and has come to collect Toshi as payment for their father's prayer years before. Toshi refuses, so Aratsu kills her pet dog.

This causes two policemen, the mysterious detective Sato and the mute detective Yamada, to investigate. They begin to follow Kai around and it is implied that they know more about what is happening than he does.

After refusing Aratsu again, Toshi decides to rid herself of him by stealing a gun from a young thug named KK, who threatens to kill her in retaliation. Meanwhile, Kai finds himself taken back into the fantasy world by Saburo, who has not aged since he was last seen. Saburo now serves a red dragon named Lord Rinjin who is the mortal enemy of Aratsu. Rinjin tells Kai that if Toshi refuses Aratsu a third time, he will have to leave her alone. He tells Kai to ensure that this happens or there will be trouble. Toshi does refuse Aratsu a third time, shooting him for good measure, but the bullets only graze him and he slices her mother into pieces as retaliation.

Toshi follows Aratsu into his palace and says that she will join him provided he restores her mother to life. In her bedroom, Kai's mother's body reforms itself but she remains unconscious. The story ends with Toshi following Aratsu to begin her new life.

Kai's mother is under observation at a local hospital, where she remains unconscious and covered with scars from Aratsu's swords. Kai's grieving is interrupted by a gang of evil imps, which start to consume pieces of his mother's memory. They run when Kai attacks them as they fear his touch, but soon find weapons in a part of the hospital that is closed for renovation. He is saved by Nidoru, goddess of needles, who dispatches them with ease.

She reveals that she is aware of the debt owed by Kai's father to Aratsu. She also explains that the imps were attracted to his mother's soul, which was also cut apart by Aratsu's swords – shredded souls being easier to consume. She also explains that she and her master were the only 'shepherds of point' not to bow to Aratsu. As punishment, he killed her master. She says that if Kai agrees to help her take Aratsu down, she will sew his mother's soul back together and try to save his father, who is destined to die in a yakuza shoot-out that day. He agrees and his mother wakes up too late to stop him from walking off with Nidoru.

In his mansion, Aratsu slices through Toshi with a special sword, cutting away both her past and future, leaving her existing in an eternal 'now'. He says that if she displeases him, he will allow that time to elapse and she will vanish. He also gives her a new name, Hasharito or 'little insect', and tells her never to think of her old name. Despairingly, she agrees.

== Collected editions ==
#	Title	ISBN	Release date	Collected material
1	Cut Here	ISBN 1-4012-1341-3	June 2007	Crossing Midnight #1–5
2	A Map of Midnight	ISBN 1-4012-1645-5	February 2008	Crossing Midnight #6–12
3	The Sword in the Soul	ISBN 1-4012-1966-7	October 2008	Crossing Midnight #13–19
