= The Fight (2018 film) =

2018 film directed by Jessica Hynes

- Film poster
- Directed by: Jessica Hynes
- Written by: Jessica Hynes
- Produced by: Jason Maza
- Starring: Jessica Hynes; Russell Brand; Anita Dobson; Rhona Mitra; Christopher Fairbank; Sennia Nanua; Alice Lowe; Sally Phillips; Liv Hill
- Release dates: October 2018 (London); March 15, 2019 (United Kingdom)
- Country: United Kingdom
- Language: English

The Fight is a 2018 British family drama film, the debut as writer-director for Jessica Hynes. The film stars Hynes, Russell Brand, Anita Dobson, Rhona Mitra, Christopher Fairbank, Sennia Nanua, Alice Lowe, Sally Phillips and Liv Hill.

== Cast ==
- Jessica Hynes as Tina Bell
- Russell Brand as The Guru
- Anita Dobson as Gene Dunn
- Rhona Mitra as Amanda Chadwick
- Christopher Fairbank as Frank Dunn
- Sennia Nanua as Emma Bell
- Alice Lowe as Home school teacher
- Sally Phillips as Beth Hunter
- Liv Hill as Jordan Chadwick
- Shaun Parkes as Micky Bell

== Plot ==
Tina is a mother of three who with her husband on nightshifts, her eldest daughter being bullied at school and her parents' relationship in trouble, is feeling overwhelmed. With the reappearance of a former school rival Tina steps into the boxing ring and discovers how to fight for herself.

== Production ==
The film was predominantly shot in and around Folkestone, Kent in 12 days with cinematographer Ryan Eddleston. Locations included Cornwallis Avenue, Folkestone Harbour Arm, Folkestone Coastal Park, The Warren, Lower Radnor Park, Folkestone academy and Folkestone amateur boxing club.

== Release ==
The Fight premiered at the 2018 London Film Festival and was released in the United Kingdom on 15 March 2019. As of October 2021, it has an 83% approval rating on Rotten Tomatoes, based on 12 critical reviews.

== Accolades ==
Hynes was nominated for best first screen play at the 2020 Writers' Guild of Great Britain awards. Eddleston was nominated for BAFTA Cymru for his Cinematography at the BAFTA Cymru 2019 awards
