= The Puma Blues =

Comic book by Stephen Murphy and Michael Zulli

- Cover of The Puma Blues, number one

Publication information
- Publisher: Aardvark One International, Mirage Studios, Dover Comics & Graphic Novels
- Format: limited series
- Publication date: 1986–1989, 2015
- No. of issues: 23, plus one minicomic, Collected Hardcover with new conclusion

Creative team
- Written by: Stephen Murphy
- Artist: Michael Zulli

The Puma Blues is a comic book written by Stephen Murphy and drawn by Michael Zulli. It ran from June 1986 to early 1989, stretching over 23 regular issues and a single "half-issue" minicomic. In 2015, it was reissued in a collected edition by Dover Comics & Graphic Novels with a new 40-page conclusion by Murphy and Zulli.

Published first by Aardvark One International and later by Mirage Studios, the story is set around the millennium and follows Gavia Immer, a governmental fauna agent (aka game warden), as he goes through an existential dilemma while watching videos his father left for him after his death.

The comic book's detailed artwork by Michael Zulli, which focused primarily on wildlife and nature, was superposed to a loose narrative with a druggy, dreamy, new age apocalyptic atmosphere. This de-structuring of the main narrative increased dramatically in later issues, with the second half of the series often taking the form of illustrated prose poetry within an associative narrative.

== Storyline ==
Issue #1 begins in March of the year 2000 (fourteen years in the future, by the comic's original publication date). It's a world of space shuttle passenger service, humanoid robotic workers, fully armored taxicabs, and children in gas masks—and is a world without the Bronx. It seems that on April 20, 1995, a white supremacist group attempted to kidnap the President during a visit to New York City. During the ensuing gunplay, a member of the group detonated a nuclear device, and five years later, the Northeastern United States is still in recovery.

U.S. Agent Gavia Immer (sharing a name with the common loon) is stationed by the U.S. military in a cabin in the woods of the Quabbin Reservoir in Massachusetts. His new job consists of displacing mutated animals ("animutes" or "biomutes") and collecting pH samples of the reservoir, which is frequently limed to compensate for the effects of acid rain.

Gavia is alone at this cabin (save for an occasional trespasser and the puma that stalks the mountains above the reservoir) but is in contact with his superiors through a video conferencing system, which he also uses to speak to his mother.

Haunted by his unresolved relationship with his late father, four years gone, he spends many nights watching a series of videotapes his father made documenting his search for truth—something Gavia also desperately seeks.

Among the questions needing answers is that of a colony of flying manta rays—the principal "animute" inhabiting the reservoir. Although the government is aware of their existence, the chief concern at the story's outset is the origin of their mutation, as well as the importance of keeping the creatures a secret.

Starting with issue #21, the story skips two years ahead, and follows Gavia as he leaves the service and begins to travel cross-country.

=== Themes ===
A strong message of environmental responsibility runs throughout the series. In one of the most memorable scenes of the comic's run, a wealthy old woman enjoys a drive through the country with her robotic chauffeur. She sees a cluster of flowers with an aluminum can beside it and urgently requests the car pull over. She then asks the chauffeur to pick the flowers for her, leaving the can behind.

Most issues include sections called "Notes on the Environment" and "The Fraying Weave", which offer facts and often frightening statistics related to tropical rainforests, endangered animals, and other environmental concerns.

== Publication history ==
The Puma Blues consisted of three separate story arcs with two stand-alone issues; the first and second arcs were later collected in trade paperback form by Mirage Studios. It was announced in issue #22 that the third story arc, "Under a Deep Blue Sun", would conclude in issue #26; however, this arc ultimately remained unfinished as The Puma Blues ended with issue #23. The 2015 hardcover collection reprints material from the 23 published issues and a minicomic, with an additional 40-page chapter wrapping up the story.

The story arcs ran as follows:

- Issues #1–12—Book One: "Watch That Man" (Aardvark One International)
- Issues #13–19—Book Two: "Sense of Doubt" (Aardvark One International #1–17, self-published #18–19)
- Issue #20 "Eat or Be Eaten" (self-published benefit issue)
- Issues #21–23—Book Three: "Under a Deep Blue Sun" (intended to end at #26, Mirage Studios)
- Issue #24 1/2 "Mobile" (16-page minicomic, Mirage Studios)
- The Complete Saga in One Volume: "Poor Little Greenie"

=== Collected editions ===
- The Puma Blues: Book One—Watch That Man (Mirage Studios)
- The Puma Blues: Book Two—Sense of Doubt (Mirage Studios)
- The Puma Blues: The Complete Saga in One Volume (Dover Comics & Graphic Novels)

=== Distribution controversy ===
In 1987, The Puma Blues publisher Dave Sim fell into dispute with Diamond Comic Distributors over his decision not to use Diamond to distribute the Cerebus graphic novel High Society. As a result, Diamond's National Account Representative William D. Schanes informed Sim: "If it is your intention to pick and choose which products you want distributors to carry, it should be our privilege to choose what we wish to distribute. Therefore, it is our feeling we should no longer carry and promote Puma Blues." At that time, Diamond distributed an estimated 33% of the series' print run. The Puma Blues creators Murphy and Zulli responded with an open letter titled "Not Fade Away", stating their intent to continue with or without Diamond's support. They then moved publication of The Puma Blues to Mirage Studios.

This incident was one of the primary factors leading to Sim's participation in developing the Creator's Bill of Rights (which was signed by both Murphy and Zulli).

This incident also led to Puma Blues #20, a special issue to benefit Murphy and Zulli created by multiple authors including Stephen Murphy, Alan Moore, Chester Brown, Dave Sim, Peter Laird, and Stephen R. Bissette.

== Critical acclaim ==
The series received praise from Alan Moore ("quite impressive, quite ambitious"), Neil Gaiman ("intelligent and urgent mythology for the end of the millennium"), The Village Voice ("difficult but intriguing"), The Comics Journal ("Zulli's wildlife art is utterly breathtaking"), and Peter Laird ("a multi-level, imaginative, lushly-rendered story").

The relative low print runs of The Puma Blues, coupled with Zulli's later popularity (primarily due to his work on Neil Gaiman's The Sandman) has made it a popular cult comic among both fans and collectors.

A lengthy tribute to and analysis of the series by Steve Bissette was included in Teenage Mutant Ninja Turtles: Soul's Winter, a 2007 trade paperback collecting Zulli & Murphy's work on Eastman and Laird's Teenage Mutant Ninja Turtles.

Rolling Stone chose The Puma Blues collection as “One of the 50 best non-superhero graphic novels of all time”.
