= Michael Zulli =

American artist (1952–2024)

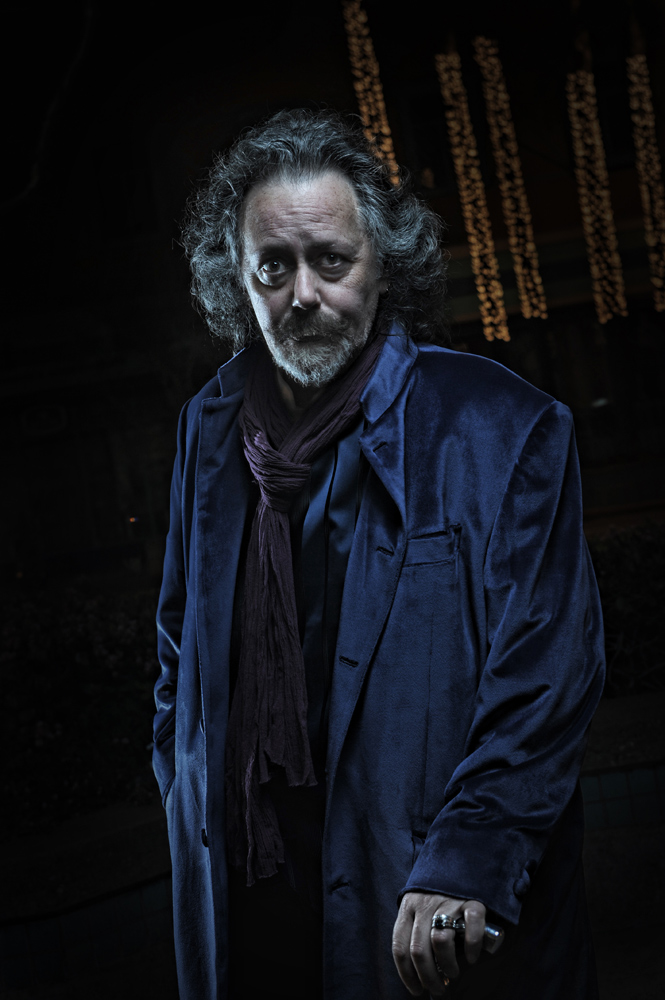
- Born: December 20, 1952
- Died: July 8, 2024 (aged 71)
- Areas: Writer, Penciller, Artist, Inker
- Notable works: The Puma Blues, The Sandman, The Fracture of the Universal Boy, Swamp Thing

Michael Zulli (December 20, 1952 – July 8, 2024) was an American artist lauded for his work as an animal and wildlife illustrator. He is also known as a comic book artist and sometime writer on such series as The Puma Blues, Swamp Thing, The Sandman, as well as many well-regarded adaptations of the work of Neil Gaiman.

== Career ==
Michael Zulli's earliest published work in comics was the October 1986 release The Puma Blues, on which he collaborated with writer Stephen Murphy. The monthly title was published by Dave Sim's Aardvark One International and later by Mirage Studios. Zulli's detailed, realistic depictions of wildlife and landscape in a near-future, polluted, post-industrial world was a metanarrative of conservation. The series was published for 23 issues, with a mini-comic half issue published in 1989.

In 1990 and 1991, Zulli wrote, drew, and painted the covers for three issues of the Teenage Mutant Ninja Turtles: #31 ("Soul's Winter") #35 ("Soul's Withering"), and #36 ("Soul's End"). His dark interpretation entitled the "Soul's Trilogy" polarized fans of the series. Over time, his work came to be considered a classic contribution to the TMNT mythos and was reissued, first by Mirage and then IDW Publishing as the graphic novel Soul's Winter.

Zulli's attention to detail and fidelity to nature garnered the admiration of many writers, editors and artists in the comics industry.

In 1993, he illustrated an issue of DC Comics' Swamp Thing in which the title character meets Jesus Christ. Thirty-six years after shelving the controversial "Jesus Christ" storyline in Swamp Thing, DC Comics announced they would be publishing the work through its adult Black Label imprint.

In the 1990s another unfinished and unpublished story, Sweeney Todd, written by Neil Gaiman and illustrated by Zulli for Stephen R. Bissette's publication Taboo was discontinued when the anthology ceased publication.

In 1990 he guest penciled issue #13 of DC Comics' nascent Vertigo series The Sandman written by Gaiman. This story introduced the Hob Gadling character.

Zulli illustrated seven Sandman issues including the final Sandman story arc "The Wake".

Zulli and Gaiman collaborated on a comic book adaptation of Alice Cooper's The Last Temptation in 1994. It was later remastered and collected at Dynamite Comics.

After the end of The Sandman series, his work was featured in the gallery show called "Visions of the Wake" in New York City. Zulli also exhibited regularly at Gallery Nucleus in Alhambra, California, and was a part of the "Endless Reflections, 20 Years of Sandman" exhibit.

Zulli illustrated several other Vertigo imprint titles including Winter's Edge, Witchcraft: La Terreur and Sandman Presents: Love Street.

He was featured artist on the Shade limited series which spun off from the popular Starman title.

In 2011, he self published The Fracture of the Universal Boy, an autobiographical, symbolist graphic novel "...that, sadly, went largely unnoticed by the audience that had so readily embraced Zulli's mainstream comic book work."

When speaking of Zulli's struggles with corporate publishing, fellow artist and writer Steve Bissette said, "Michael dramatized such issues, metaphorically but vividly, in his single solo graphic novel, The Fracture of the Universal Boy. That was entirely Michael's baby, an enigmatic and powerfully rendered masterpiece, but it was a crowdfunded venture, rarely seen since its launch."

== Personal life ==
Zulli married his long-time partner Karen Pratt-Smith Zulli in August 2019.

Zulli pulled away from comic book work in the mid-2000's in hopes of establishing a career in fine art. He lived and worked with his wife in a home and studio which they created in a 19th-century hotel in Browns Valley, Minnesota.

Zulli was diagnosed with cancer over ten years prior to his death. He was treated successfully. The cancer recurred and was diagnosed the day before died July 8, 2024, at the age of 71.

== Comics bibliography ==
- 1986–1988: The Puma Blues #1–19 – penciller/inker (Aardvark One International)
- 1988–1989: The Puma Blues #20–23, mini-comic - penciller/inker (Mirage Studios)
- 1988: Teenage Mutant Ninja Turtles #31, 35–36 - writer/penciller/inker (Mirage Studios)
- 1989: Taboo #2 – writer/penciller/inker (Spiderbaby Grafix)
- 1990: The Sandman #13 – penciller (DC Comics)
- 1990: Taboo #4 – penciller/inker (Spiderbaby Grafix)
- 1991: Taboo #5 – writer/penciller (Spiderbaby Grafix)
- 1991: Tundra Sketchbook Series #3 – penciller (Tundra Publishing)
- 1992: Legends of Arzach #2 – penciller (Tundra Publishing, Ltd.)
- 1992: Taboo #6 – penciller (Spiderbaby Grafix)
- 1992: Taboo #7 – penciller/inker (Spiderbaby Grafix)
- 1993: The Sandman #50 – pinup (Vertigo)
- 1993: Angels and Visitations – penciller/inker (DreamHaven Books)
- 1993: Guest of Honor – penciller (no publisher)
- 1994: A Death Gallery #1 – penciller/inker (Vertigo)
- 1994: Roarin' Rick's Rarebit Friends #8–9 – penciller/inker (King Hell)
- 1994: Alice Cooper: The Last Temptation #1–3 – penciller/inker (Marvel Comics/Marvel Music)
- 1994: The Staros Report #2 – penciller (Star House)
- 1994: Witchcraft #4 – penciller/inker (Vertigo)
- 1994: Turtle Soup #4 – penciller/inker (Mirage Studios)
- 1995: The Sandman #53 – partial penciller (Vertigo)
- 1996: The Dreaming #8 – penciller/inker (Vertigo)
- 1996: The Sandman #70–73 – penciller (issues were not inked) (Vertigo)
- 1996: Seekers into the Mystery #6–9 – penciller/inker (Vertigo)
- 1997: Destiny: A Chronicle of Deaths Foretold #1 – penciller/inker (Vertigo)
- 1997: The Shade #4 – penciller/inker (DC Comics)
- 1998: Vertigo: Winter's Edge #3 – partial penciller/inker (short story) (Vertigo)
- 1998: Witchcraft: La Terreur #1–3 – penciller/inker (Vertigo)
- 1998: Longshot: Fools – penciller (Marvel Comics)
- 1999: Batman: No Man's Land #1 – penciller (DC Comics)
- 1999: Star Wars Tales #13 – penciller/inker (Dark Horse Comics)
- 1999: Webspinners: Tales of Spider-Man #1–3 – penciller/inker (Marvel Comics)
- 2000: The Quotable Sandman – penciller (Vertigo)
- 2000: The Sandman Presents: Love Street #1–3 – penciller (Vertigo)
- 2000: Vertigo Secret Files and Origins: Swamp Thing #1 – penciller/inker (Vertigo)
- 2000–2001: Legends of the DC Universe #33–36 – penciller (DC Comics)
- 2001: Witchblade #47 – penciller/inker (Image Comics/Top Cow Productions)
- 2001: Delicate Creatures – penciller/inker (Image Comics/Top Cow Productions)
- 2002: 9-11: The World's Finest Comic Book Writers & Artists Tell Stories to Remember, Volume Two – penciller/inker (DC Comics)
- 2002: Grendel: Red, White and Black #4 - penciller (Dark Horse Comics)
- 2004: Creatures of the Night – penciller/inker/painter (Dark Horse Comics)
- 2007: The Facts in the Case of the Departure of Miss Finch – penciller/inker/painter (Dark Horse Comics)
- 2011: The Fracture of the Universal Boy – writer/penciller/inker
- 2015: The Puma Blues: The Complete Saga in One Volume collects The Puma Blues #1–23 with a new 40-page conclusion – penciller/inker (Dover Publications)

== Awards and nominations ==
- Eisner Award
  - 1996 Nominated for Best Serialized Story (with Neil Gaiman for "The Wake", in The Sandman #70–72)
  - 1996 Nominated for Best Best Penciller/Inker (for "The Wake")
  - 1996 Nominated for Best Comics-Related Item (for Sandman: The Wake poster)

Preceded by Marc Hempel	The Sandman artist 1995	Succeeded by Jon J Muth
Preceded by Jon J Muth	Seekers into the Mystery artist 1996	Succeeded by Jon J Muth
Preceded by n/a	Webspinners: Tales of Spider-Man artist 1999	Succeeded by Keith Giffen
