= God Save the Queen (comics) =

Graphic novella by Mike Carey and John Bolton

God save the Queen
- Cover by John Bolton
- Date: June 2007
- Page count: 96 pages
- Publisher: Vertigo

Creative team
- Writers: Mike Carey
- Artists: John Bolton
- Letterers: Todd Klein

God Save the Queen is a 96-page graphic novel published in 2007 by Vertigo imprint of DC Comics. It was written by Mike Carey and painted by John Bolton.

Described by Carey as "a Sandman Presents OGN", it is based on the characters seen in The Sandman, The Dreaming and The Books of Magic, and tells the story of a teenager who gets involved in the conflict between Queen Titania and her predecessor Queen Mab.

== Plot ==
The book is set in London and the protagonist is a rebellious teenager named Linda, who lives with her mum Ava, her dad having left her mother some time ago.

The story begins with Queen Mab escaping from the place where she had been confined by Queen Titania in the land of Faerie and overthrowing Titania. The Puck sides with Mab who has since imprisoned Auberon in chains. Linda has a friend named Jeffrey. One night while dragging Jeffrey clubbing, Linda meets up with a stranger named Verian who takes Linda and Jeffrey home where he asks Linda if she wants to be introduced to something new, a drug named Red Horse. Verian prepares this drug by mixing some of Linda's blood with heroin. Linda's relationship with her mother is strained and Linda blames her for her father leaving them. Linda continues her drug abuse, and eventually Verian takes her to border of the Faerie where things have now changed due to Mab's rule. While running back Linda is hit in the arm with an arrow and gets separated from the rest. There she meets Cluracan who heals her wound. He managers to get a promise out of Linda in return for showing her the way back. Cluracan asks her to serve his queen at her need. If the queen should meet Linda and call on her, Linda won't deny her. Cluracan also calls Linda a changeling, a gale sidhe, a turn-dolly which is a fairy child left in exchange for a human one. Linda is brought back into the world, and she snubs Jeffrey who she feels wasn't there when she needed him.

While going home Linda meets a hideously ugly woman Titania who is turned away by Ava. Linda leaves Ava who she feels seduced her dad from the Faerie and had kept this fact from her. Linda goes back to Verian who reveals that he is also from the Faerie and explains how cold iron kills fairy. He also tells her that the hot iron in human blood is poison too, but a changelings blood takes the edge of it and mixing it with charmed heroin is what gives it the kick. Linda makes love to Verian, who later on tries to make a hit using her father's christening spoon which he drops, as it is made of iron. The Puck then comes to Verian's room with a bag of heroin and tells Linda that he saw Death go in the corridor and she was with Linda's friend. Linda rushes to the next room to see that Jeffrey has overdosed. Linda makes a brief visit to the dreaming where she meets Lucius, Nuala and The Sandman. She also sees Jeff in a grotesque collection of dead souls which is later revealed as Mabs' heart. When she wakes up she sees Queen Titania who carries her home, where she meets Ava, and reveals that Ava was exiled from faerie, which surprises Linda who had believed it was her dad. Titania also reveals how Mab escaped. Mab who was imprisoned in her cell gave each one who visited her a piece of her heart without their knowing. Then when the fairy were killed it released the fragment of Mab which came together, and Linda realises it is the Red Horse drug that kills the fairy. Titania calls on Linda to fulfill the oath she had made to Cluracan. Ava also comes along to protect her daughter, and it revealed that Ava is the architect of the palace. Ava releases all the faerie who have been trapped by Mab. There is a fight between these faerie and the faerie who are allied with Mab. Linda injects herself with Red Horse, which she mixes with her fathers christening spoon and she is bound to Mab's heart which Titania wants to pull down and destroy. Mab arrives on the scene and interrupts them. Ava uses her mastery of the palace to trap Mab under a pillar and both she and Titania aim their bows to Mab's heart but their arrows are prevented from meeting their target by the Puck. Mab who says she spared Titania because she feared her death curse chokes Ava and Titania with the strings of their bows thereby preventing them from speaking.

The souls of Jeffrey and Linda's dad speak the words "Cold Iron" and Linda reaches out to her dad's christening spoon and hurls it at Mab who is destroyed by it. Titania asks Ava and Linda for any reward. Linda asks for Jeffrey and her dad to be bought back but Titania says she cannot, and asks if there is anything else, to which Linda replies nothing that matters. Verian meets with Linda and informs her that Titania has closed the border, but shows Linda that he still has some stock of heroin and asks Linda to drip for him. Linda remembers the people trapped in Mab's heart killed by the Red horse and walks away. Titania has said that Ava and Linda can come back to Faerie anytime, but Linda and her mum refuse as there are fairer realms than Faerie and taller towers.

== Characters ==
- Linda: Rebellious teenager who is a changeling, an offspring of a fairy and human
- Jeffrey: Linda's childhood friend who has always been with her
- Ava: Linda's mother who had been exiled from faerie for loving someone other than Titania.
- Queen Titania: Queen of Faerie
- Queen Mab: Former queen of Faerie who had been imprisoned by Titania.
- Cluracan: Ambassador for Queen Titania and still loyal to Queen Titania
- Verian: A rogue fairy who is supplied charmed heroin by the Puck
- The Puck: A mischief maker who switches allegiance to Queen Mab

== Publication ==
- God Save the Queen (by Mike Carey and John Bolton, graphic novel, 96 pages, Vertigo, June 2007, ISBN 1-4012-0303-5)
