= Destiny: A Chronicle of Deaths Foretold =

Comic book series

- Cover to issue #1 of Destiny: A Chronicle of Deaths Foretold (April 1996), art by Kent Williams.

Publication information
- Publisher: DC Comics
- Schedule: Monthly
- Format: Limited series
- Publication date: April 1996 – July 1996
- No. of issues: 3
- Main character: Destiny of the Endless

Creative team
- Written by: Alisa Kwitney
- Artist(s): Kent Williams; Michael Zulli; Scott Hampton; Rebecca Guay
- Letterer: Todd Klein
- Colorist: Sherilyn Van Valkenburgh
- Editor(s): Karen Berger; Joan Hilty

Collected editions
- Destiny: A Chronicle of Deaths Foretold: ISBN 1-56389-505-6

Destiny: A Chronicle of Deaths Foretold is a three-issue comic book mini-series published by Vertigo in 1996, written by Alisa Kwitney and with art by Kent Williams, Michael Zulli, Scott Hampton and Rebecca Guay. A spin-off from Neil Gaiman's Sandman series, it features Destiny of the Endless, a character available for use by other writers because, unlike the other Endless, Gaiman had not created him.

Published in prestige format, each of the three issues detailed a story of a different plague from history, with a framing sequence set in a future world decimated by a new plague. Each issue's story was illustrated by a different artist, with Zulli, Hampton and Guay painting issues one, two and three respectively; the framing story and cover art were by Williams.

The title is a reference to the novel Chronicle of a Death Foretold by Gabriel García Márquez.

== Plot ==
In October 2009, the world's population has been decimated by the spread of new strain of the Bubonic Plague which is resistant to antibiotics. One small group of survivors, led by Ruth Knight, is visited by a stranger who claims to possess a page from the Book of Destiny that foretells the future. To prove its accuracy he tells stories from the page of the Byzantine Empire during the Plague of Justinian (issue one), a princess at the beginning of the Black Death (issue two) and an Englishwoman during the Great Plague of London (issue three). Destiny himself is involved in each of the stories. The stranger then claims the page predicts the future of the current plague as well, and offers Ruth knowledge of her own destiny.

== Awards ==
Destiny: A Chronicle of Deaths Foretold was nominated for the Eisner Award for "Best Limited Series" in 1998; the award went to Batman: The Long Halloween.

== Collected editions ==
It was collected in 2000 as a 144-page trade paperback with a new introduction by Kwitney. It is no longer in print.

== See also ==
- List of The Sandman spinoffs
