= Ultimate Vision (comic book) =

Comic book series

- Ultimate Vision Issue 1

Publication information
- Publisher: Marvel Comics
- Schedule: Monthly
- Format: Mini-series
- No. of issues: Five
- Main character: Vision (comics)

Creative team
- Written by: Mike Carey
- Artist: Brandon Peterson
- Inker: Matt Ryan
- Colorist: Justin Ponsor

Ultimate Vision was a five-issue-long comic book limited series published by Marvel Comics during 2006-2007 under the Ultimate Marvel imprint.

The series is a sequel to The Ultimate Galactus Trilogy and follows Vision leaving Earth. It is written by Mike Carey with art by Brandon Peterson.

== Plot ==
After leaving Earth, Vision encountered a "distress" signal from an A.I.M. space station. However, the signal was a ruse concocted by the station's commander George Tarleton. Tarleton tricked Vision into reactivating an intact Gah Lak Tus module left over from the devastation of the Ultimate Nullifier under the guise that they would order it to self-destruct. During her brief tour of the station, Vision befriended an artificially created girl named Dima. After she helped in "deactivating" the module, the power of the module was transferred to Tarleton. In "repayment" for Vision's aid, Tarleton uses his new-found power to fire an energy beam at her, breaking her in half and taking control of the module, turning him into more of a cybernetic monster. The vision was later dumped into the station's disposal facility, where an eccentric disposal worker decided to keep her intact. After Tarleton was eventually controlled by the Gah Lak Tus module, killed, and infected all the A.I.M.'s crew members, Vision was able to self-repair and revive herself with Dima's help. The vision was able to undo Tarleton's mental damage caused by his transformation and overcome the module's influence; the three, including Dima, escape the station after destroying it. Vision and Dima escaped on a shuttle waste dump while Tarleton clung to the pieces of the destroyed station as they re-entered Earth's atmosphere. However, after Vision and Dima re-entered Earth, a fully repaired Gah Lak Tus module also re-entered Earth into the United States. Following the module fully planned on destroying and feeding the Earth, Vision teamed up with Tarleton and Falcon in destroying the module. During the battle, the group was barely finishing off the module, until Vision was horrified by seeing Tarleton using Dima as a last resort in their battle by letting her self-destruct in front of the Gah Lak Tus module, critically damaging it. After the module was destroyed, Vision was infuriated with Tarleton's callous actions and violently ripped his cybernetic head off his body and threw it far over the horizon. Deeply saddened by the loss of Dima and being unable to leave Earth, Falcon comforted her and gave her his keys to his apartment in La Jolla if she needed a place to stay. The series ended with Tarleton's head, still intact, requesting someone to home in on his signal and pick him up.
