= Frankie (2019 film) =

2019 film

- Theatrical release poster
- Directed by: Ira Sachs
- Written by: Ira Sachs; Mauricio Zacharias
- Produced by: Saïd Ben Saïd; Michel Merkt
- Starring: Isabelle Huppert; Brendan Gleeson; Marisa Tomei; Jérémie Renier; Pascal Greggory; Vinette Robinson; Ariyon Bakare; Carloto Cotta; Sennia Nanua; Greg Kinnear
- Cinematography: Rui Poças
- Edited by: Sophie Reine
- Music by: Dickon Hinchliffe
- Production companies: SBS Productions; Secret Engine
- Distributed by: SBS Distribution (France); Sony Pictures Classics (United States); Midas Filmes (Portugal)
- Release dates: May 20, 2019 (Cannes); August 28, 2019 (France); October 25, 2019 (United States); December 12, 2019 (Portugal)
- Running time: 98 minutes
- Countries: United States; France; Portugal
- Languages: English; French
- Box office: $725,642

Frankie is a 2019 drama film directed by Ira Sachs, from a screenplay by Sachs and Mauricio Zacharias. It stars Isabelle Huppert, Brendan Gleeson, Greg Kinnear, Marisa Tomei, and Jérémie Renier.

It had its world premiere at the 2019 Cannes Film Festival on May 20, 2019. It was released in France on August 28, 2019, by SBS Distribution, in the United States on October 25, 2019, by Sony Pictures Classics, and in Portugal on December 12, 2019, by Midas Filmes.

== Plot ==
Frankie, a well-known French actress, has only a few months to live. For that reason, she decides to spend her last vacation with her large family in Sintra (Portugal). Despite the picturesque location, the relatives present struggle with a variety of love, marriage and money problems.

== Cast ==
- Isabelle Huppert as Frankie
- Greg Kinnear as Gary
- Marisa Tomei as Ilene
- Jérémie Renier as Paul
- Brendan Gleeson as Jimmy
- Vinette Robinson as Sylvia
- Ariyon Bakare as Ian
- Pascal Greggory as Michel
- Carloto Cotta as Tiago
- Sennia Nanua as Maya

== Production ==
In February 2018, it was announced Isabelle Huppert, Greg Kinnear, Marisa Tomei, Jérémie Renier and Andre Wilms had joined the cast of the film, with Ira Sachs directing the film, from a screenplay he wrote alongside Mauricio Zacharias. Saïd Ben Saïd and Michel Merkt will serve as producers on the film, while Lucas Joaquin and Kevin Chneiweiss will serve as executive producers under their Secret Engine and SBS Productions banners, respectively. In September 2018, Brendan Gleeson, Vinette Robinson, Ariyon Bakare, and Pascal Greggory joined the cast of the film.

=== Filming ===
Principal photography began in October 2018, primarily in the Portuguese Riviera.

== Release ==
It had its world premiere at the Cannes Film Festival on May 20, 2019. Prior to, Sony Pictures Classics acquired distribution rights to the film for North America, Eastern Europe including the CIS, Scandinavia, the Middle East, South Africa, Spain, India and airlines worldwide. It was released in France on August 28, 2019. It is scheduled to be released in the United States on October 25, 2019.

== Reception ==
On review aggregator website Rotten Tomatoes, the film holds an approval rating of 56% based on 104 reviews, with an average rating of 5.5/10. The website's critics consensus reads, "Flawed yet well-acted, Frankie finds director/co-writer Ira Sachs getting snagged in his story's thorny relationships -- and often freed by his stellar cast." Metacritic, which uses a weighted average, assigned the film a score of 56 out of 100, based on 27 critics, indicating "mixed or average" reviews.
