= Brandon Peterson =

American comic book writer and artist

- Born: 1969 (age 56–57)
- Areas: Writer, Penciller
- Notable works: Uncanny X-Men; Codename: Strykeforce

Brandon Peterson (born 1969) is an American comic book writer and artist, known for his work on Marvel Comics and Top Cow's Codename: Strykeforce in the 1990s.

== Career ==
Peterson's early works for Marvel include a New Warriors annual and a fill-in in X-Factor in 1992. Later in the year, he had a short run in Uncanny X-Men, drawing the title's issues of the "X-Cutioner's Song" storyline.

Peterson left Marvel to join Top Cow, pencilling the ongoing title Codename: Strykeforce. After the title's cancellation, he wrote and drew the creator-owned title Arcanum, before returning to Marvel in 1999 to work on several X-Men spinoff mini-series.

He left Marvel once more to become Art Director of CrossGen Comics, but returned for another stint on Ultimate X-Men and the mini-series Ultimate Vision and Strange.

Preceded by Jim Lee (with Whilce Portacio, 1991–1992)	Uncanny X-Men artist 1992–1993	Succeeded by John Romita Jr.
