= Alisa Kwitney =

American writer (born 1964)

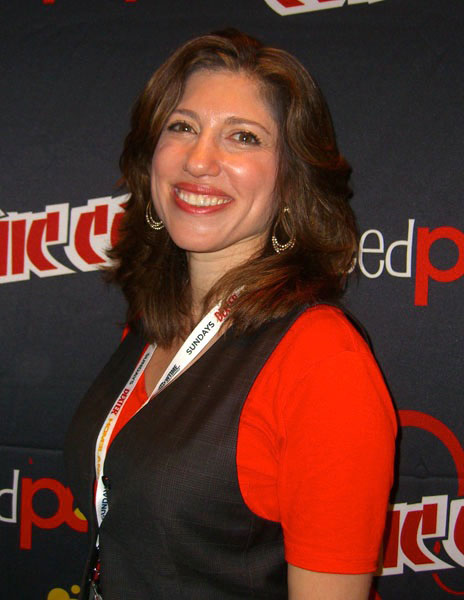
- Kwitney at the 2012 New York Comic Con
- Born: 1964 (age 61–62) New York City, U.S.
- Area: Writer

Alisa Kwitney (born 1964) is an American writer of comedic romance novels and graphic novels.

== Biography ==
Kwitney grew up in New York City, on Manhattan's Upper West Side, the daughter of science fiction author Robert Sheckley and Ziva Kwitney.

Alisa Kwitney has a BA in English from Wesleyan University, where she received the Horgan Writing Prize for Fiction, and an MFA in fiction from Columbia University, where she received a scholarship of merit. Her master's thesis was published by HarperCollins as her first novel, Till The Fat Lady Sings, in 1991. Kwitney was an editor for Vertigo Comics. She is currently the editor for Liminal Comics at Brain Mill Press.

Kwitney lives in an old farmhouse two hours from Manhattan with her husband and two children.

== Bibliography ==
=== Novels ===
- Till The Fat Lady Sings (1991) ISBN 0-06-019021-3
- The Dominant Blonde published by Avon Books in June, 2002 ISBN 0-06-008329-8
- Does She or Doesn't She? published by Avon Books in June, 2003 ISBN 0-06-051237-7
- On the Couch published (paperback) by HarperCollins, July 1, 2004 ISBN 0-06-053079-0
- Sex as a Second Language: A Novel published by Atria Books, April 25, 2006, 978-0-74326890-5
- Flirting in Cars published by Atria Books, August, 2007, 978-0-7432-6897-4
- The Better to Hold You (as Alisa Sheckley) by Ballantine Books, 2009, 978-0-345-50587-3
- Moonburn (as Alisa Sheckley) by Ballantine Books, 2009, 978-0-345-50588-0
- New Avengers: Breakout (adapted from the graphic novel by Brian Michael Bendis and David Finch) Marvel, 2013, 978-0-7851-6517-0
- Cadaver & Queen published by Harlequin Teen, February 2018, 1335470468

=== Graphic novels ===
- The Dreaming: Beyond The Shores of Night (editor and contributing author) DC Comics, (1998) 1-56389-393-2
- Destiny: A Chronicle of Deaths Foretold (Nominated for Best Limited Series Eisner Award) (March 2000) ISBN 1-56389-505-6
- Vertigo Visions: The Phantom Stranger (October 2003) ISBN 0-8230-5603-1
- Token (November 2008) ISBN 1-4012-1538-6
- A Flight of Angels (Contributing author) by Vertigo/DC Comics (2011) 978-1-4012-2147-8
- Batman: No Man's Land Volume 3 (Contributing author) by DC Comics (2012) 978-1-4012-3456-0
- Mystik U by DC Comics, November, 2017

=== Non-fiction ===
- Child of Mine (Contributing author) (1997) ISBN 0-7868-6233-5
- Vertigo Visions: Artwork from the Cutting Edge of Comics (2000) (Nominated for Locus Best Art Book) 0-8230-5603-1
- The Sandman: King of Dreams (2003) 0-8118-3592-8

== See also ==
- The Sandman
