= Sennia Nanua =

British actress

- Born: 2002 (age 23–24); Nottingham, England
- Occupation: Actress
- Years active: 2015–present

Sennia Nanua (born 2002, Nottingham, England) is a British actress.

In 2015, she appeared in the British short film Beverley, before making her full-length feature debut as the eponymous character in the BAFTA-nominated The Girl With All The Gifts when she was 13 years old. Nanua appeared in Jessica Hynes' directing debut, The Fight, released in 2019.

== Filmography ==
Year	Title	Role	Notes
2015	Beverley	Jess	Short (as Sennia Nenua)
2016	The Girl With All The Gifts	Melanie	
2018	The Fight	Emma Bell	
2018	Casualty	Keely Arnolds	1 episode
2019	Frankie	Maya Andoh	
2022	The Serpent Queen	Rahima	

== Awards and nominations ==
Year	Awards / Festival	Category	Nominated work	Result	Ref.
2016	49th Sitges Film Festival	Best Actress	The Girl with All the Gifts	Won	
2016	19th British Independent Film Awards	Most Promising Newcomer	The Girl with All the Gifts	Nominated	
2017	37th London Film Critics Circle Awards	Young British/Irish Performer of the Year	The Girl with All the Gifts	Nominated	
2017	22nd Empire Awards	Best Female Newcomer	The Girl with All the Gifts	Nominated	
