= Tales of the Teenage Mutant Ninja Turtles season 2 =

Season of television series

Tales of the Teenage Mutant Ninja Turtles
- Season 2
- Promotional poster
- Showrunners: Christopher Yost; Alan Wan
- Starring: Micah Abbey; Shamon Brown Jr.; Nicolas Cantu; Brady Noon; Ayo Edebiri
- No. of episodes: 12

Release
- Original network: Paramount+
- Original release: December 12, 2025

Season chronology
- ← Previous; Season 1

The second and final season of the American animated television series Tales of the Teenage Mutant Ninja Turtles is based on the Teenage Mutant Ninja Turtles characters by Peter Laird and Kevin Eastman. Serving as a spin-off of the 2023 film Mutant Mayhem, it follows the Turtles as they navigate their dual lives as both teenagers and heroes in New York City. The season was produced by Nickelodeon Animation Studio, Point Grey Pictures, and animation studio Titmouse, with Christopher Yost and Alan Wan serving as showrunners.

Micah Abbey, Shamon Brown Jr., Nicolas Cantu, Brady Noon, and Ayo Edebiri reprise their voice roles from Mutant Mayhem. The series was ordered for two seasons in July 2023 with Yost and Wan on board as showrunners. In November 2025, it was announced that the series was cancelled due to management shifts caused by the Paramount-Skydance merger and that the second season would be its last.

The season was released on Paramount+ on December 12, 2025, and received three Annie Award nominations. A tie-in comic book series was launched by IDW Publishing in October 2025 and is set to continue past the show's end.

== Episodes ==
No. overall	No. in season	Title	Directed by	Written by	Storyboarded by	Original release date	Nickelodeon and Nicktoons air date
13	1	"Mutant Battle Arena"	Kevin Molina-Ortiz^{st} ^{su}	Christopher Yost	Richard Chi, Chris Luc, and Lyndsay Simpson	December 12, 2025	July 10, 2026
Part 1 of 3: Raph is extremely frustrated that his brothers don't want him to always be fighting, and he finds comfort in the form of his new trainer, Spuds, who truly understands him. Little does Raph know, however, that Spuds is secretly a Purple Dragon. Meanwhile, Bebop and Rocksteady are meeting people outside when two unknown assailants come from behind and place devices on the backs of their necks that brainwash them, forcing them to fight each other. The next day, the Turtles check with the Mutanimals - Leatherhead, Ray Fillet, Scumbug, Genghis Frog and Wingnut - but they aren't given much information. They try to ask Mondo Gecko, but he’s unavailable - unbeknownst to the Turtles, he got brainwashed too. The four brothers go investigate later on that night, but are unable to talk Bebop and Rocksteady out of their now-zombified state, leading to the Turtles being forced to fight them at a construction site. After getting into another argument with Leonardo, Donatello and Michelangelo, Raph goes to train with Spuds again to blow off steam, and Spuds soon reveals to him about a secret underground battle arena where he can feel free to fight as much as he wants. This immediately sparks Raph's interest and he decides that he wants in.
14	2	"Mutantweight Title Bout"	Laura Gille^{st} Kevin Molina-Ortiz^{su}	Matthew Bass	Sebrina Gao, William Shen, and Tim Yan	December 12, 2025	July 17, 2026
Part 2 of 3: Raph is amazed by the Battle Arena and decides to sign up after seeing Purple Dragons Hun and Angel there. We also immediately learn that the Dragons themselves are the ones behind the mind-control devices. Kitsune decides to use Raph’s love of fighting to her advantage and she lies to Raph that the Purple Dragons have gone good, investing in the arena, where mutants can spar with the human competitors and each other, but the Dragons are the only ones who can’t compete. Raph immediately becomes a fighting sensation in the Mutant Battle Arena, but his brothers soon become suspicious to his constant sneaking out at night and returning home injured and with expensive stuff, so the next day, they follow him, while the Purple Dragons spy on both the Turtles and Leatherhead. Raph immediately catches on and eventually loses Leo, Donnie and Mikey whilst in his new truck, the "Turtle Tank". Leo goes after him in a taxi, and while using the air ducts, finds out about the Arena before he’s soon caught by Angel and two other Purple Dragon members, Cane and Boomerang, but escapes moments later. Back in the sewers, Leo, Donnie and Mikey confront Raph about the Arena and decide to tell Splinter, until Pete arrives and drops the bomb that they were spying on Raph, causing him to lash out at them and leave. While investigating the Arena later, Leo, Donnie and Mikey find Bebop, Rocksteady and Mondo in their zombified states and soon Leatherhead as well before they attack the Turtles, leaving Leo, Donnie and Mikey to eventually get cornered by them and the Purple Dragons.
15	3	"Raph Fights Everyone"	Rie Koga^{st} Kevin Molina-Ortiz^{su}	Ellie Guzman	Kyra Pescador, Andy Pineda, and Ed Raza	December 12, 2025	July 24, 2026
Part 3 of 3: Raph is horrified to learn that Kitsune has controlled his own family into fighting him. No longer wanting to fight, he escapes, but not before he gets a clue from Hun to “ talk to his trainer”. After he loses the brainwashed mutants, he catches up to Pigeon Pete, who deduces that Hun’s clue meant Spuds. Together, they interrogate him, learning that he’s a Purple Dragon and that Kitsune is trying to sell the mind-control devices to Arena investor Knox before the devices melt the mutants’ brains. Raph and Pete make a plan for Raph to distract the mutants and the Purple Dragons while Pete steals the briefcase containing the devices, but it fails when the Dragons catch him. Hun pretends that Pete’s trying to escape so he can run out with the briefcase, and after losing the Dragons and the brainwashed mutants, he meets with Raph, who brutally destroys the briefcase, making the devices fall of the controlled mutants, reverting them to normal. Raph concludes that he never wants to fight his brothers again.
16	4	"The Island"	JJ Conway^{st} Kevin Molina-Ortiz^{su}	Kevin Burke and Chris "Doc" Wyatt	Richard Chi, Matthew Kim, and Lyndsay Simpson	December 12, 2025	July 31, 2026
Part 1 of 3: Donnie is tired of his brothers always making fun of him for his interests in robotics, anime and science-fiction. Wingnut finds them and alerts them that Ray Fillet was attacked in Central Park the other night, so they go with the Mutanimals to the zoo veterinarian to find out what happened. While there, Ray Fillet temporarily wakes up and points to the Turtles as his attacker! This makes the Mutanimals start fighting them until Donnie explains that they were in their sewer lair, meaning that they are innocent. That's when a mutant snapping turtle, Tokka, crashes through the wall and attacks the Turtles and the Mutanimals before he escapes, saying, "There’s more of me where I came from." The Turtles track him to a Staten Island ferry, where they bait him out with snacks to interrogate him. After the Turtles fight with Tokka, they try to interrogate him, but Tokka explodes into a pile of mutagen, turning into a normal baby turtle. When his brothers try to get him to hack Tokka's watch, Donnie scolds them for not understanding him and heads to his robotics meet with his lab partners Irma and Ian. Suddenly, he gets a coded message from Wingnut through the newly-repaired Metalhead that she’s in trouble, and he goes to Staten Island help her. In an abandoned laboratory, he's attacked by Tokka along with his fellow mutants - Rahzar, a wolf, Antrax, an ant, Scale Tail, a cobra, and Wyrm, an earthworm, and soon learns of they need Donnie's help to stabilize the mutagen with the blood of a stable mutant to permanently seize their continuous explosions, but they see the Turtles and Mutanimals as traitors when they defeated Superfly. At a pizza parlor, a clone of Tokka ambushes Leo, Raph and Mikey and soon explodes and demutates afterwards, but they’re left confused when they see another Tokka outside.
17	5	"The Other Mutanimals"	Laura Gille^{st} Kevin Molina-Ortiz^{su}	Felicia Ho	Sebrina Gao, William Shen, and Tim Yan	December 12, 2025	August 7, 2026
Part 2 of 3: A decade ago, a man works on an experiment with his mutagen where he tries to mutate one of the ants in his ant farm. The mutation doesn't hold and it regresses back to an ant. The man then moves on to an earthworm from his earthworm farm. Tokka and Rahzar explain to Don that they want to take Wingnut's blood as Donatello is attacked by Antrax, Scale Tale, and Wyrm. Meanwhile, the others follow the other Tokka to Staten Island where they fight the Other Mutanimals. Donatello finds a secret room with a pre-recorded video made by a Rahzar who has left information for any of his fellow Mutanimals that find this room where it was mentioned that Wyrm. Donnie is then attacked by a Rahzar as he tries to reason with it. As the Turtles reunite, some of the Other Mutanimal clones demutate upon reaching their limit as their Maker shows up with more of his Mutanimals.
18	6	"The Rejects"	Rie Koga^{st} Kevin Molina-Ortiz^{su}	Matthew Bass	Kyra Pescador, Andy Pineda, and Ed Raza	December 12, 2025	August 21, 2026
Part 3 of 3: In a flashback, a man has sushi with Baxter Stockman as he proposes that they work together to gain an office at TCRI. In the present, the man introduces himself as Dr. Jordan Perry as he has Donatello locked up in a cage vowing to experiment on him later only for Don to persuade him to try to help the Other Mutanimals. Though Don has no information that can help Perry and mentioning that the Nobel Peace Prize happened weeks ago which he planned to enter his Mutant Omega in, Dr. Perry has Don locked up again while discovering that his rejection email from the Nobel Peace Prize was in spam. Don then uses a remote control. This ends up activating the Metalhead project that he and Irma worked on. Irma follows it out the door as an impressed science fair judge declares the Metalhead project the winner. Upon arriving at Dr. Perry's hideout, Irma waits outside and Metalhead enters. A trapped Tokka and Rahzar watch the modified video that has Donatello asking them to help out. After Metalhead frees the Turtles which leads to their Tokka and Rahzar guards demutating, a Tokka and Rahzar get annoyed with Dr. Perry's failure and end up releasing the Other Mutanimal copies from their tubes. This also unleashes Mutant Omega as Dr. Perry admits that he made it from samples of his own hair, fingernails, and skin flakes. As Dr. Perry tries to give Mutant Omega an order, it swallows him instead and attacks the Other Mutanimal copies. The Tokka and Rahzar that watched the modified video defeat the rogue Tokka and Rahzar while sporting glasses. As Mutant Omega starts to become unstable, Tokka, Rahzar, and the remaining Mutanimals sacrifice themselves to allow the Turtles and Metalhead to get away with Wingnut. With the explosion contained inside, the Turtles, Wingnut, and Metalhead meet up with Irma as Leo, Mikey, and Raph vow not to take Donatello for granted again as they head back to Manhattan. Back inside, the de-mutated animals are shown around Mutant Omega's demutated remains as Dr. Perry emerges. What Dr. Perry and the Turtles don't know is that the final five tubes containing a Tokka, a Rahzar, an Antrax, a Scale Tale, and a Wyrm open with the tube's computer stating that their mutations are stable. Back in the Turtles' Lair, Don and Irma show the Turtles a video game based on the Staten Island experience.
19	7	"Rise of the Night Ninja"	JJ Conway^{st} Kevin Molina-Ortiz^{su}	Ellie Guzman	Richard Chi, Matthew Kim, and Lyndsay Simpson	December 12, 2025	October 10, 2026 (Nicktoons)
20	8	"The Night Ninja Returns"	Laura Gille^{st} Kevin Molina-Ortiz^{su}	Rebecca Hoobler	Sebrina Gao, William Shen, and Tim Yan	December 12, 2025	October 17, 2026 (Nicktoons)
21	9	"The Itching Scratch"	Rie Koga^{st} Kevin Molina-Ortiz^{su}	Aliza & Talia Berger	Kyra Pescador, Andy Pineda, and Ed Raza	December 12, 2025	October 24, 2026 (Nicktoons)
22	10	"Get Rod"	JJ Conway^{st} Kevin Molina-Ortiz^{su}	Mikey Levitt	Richard Chi, Matthew Kim, and Lyndsay Simpson	December 12, 2025	October 31, 2026 (Nicktoons)
Part 1 of 3: The turtles are repeatedly ambushed by Rod Underwood Jr., who desperately wants to be a mutant, and Mikey is forced by his brothers to end his friendship with him, until he learns from Underwood Sr. that Rod had been kidnapped when he revealed he managed to obtain mutagen blood. Mikey, at first, believes Bishop, now an asset of the EPF, kidnapped Rod and visits her at her office with his comedy team, until he ended up sneezing, to the point her Mechazoids attacks her, until Bishop's bosses force her to stand down. Bishop tells Mikey to try Rod's siblings.
23	11	"The Unusual Suspects"	Laura Gille^{st} Kevin Molina-Ortiz^{su}	Ellie Guzman	Sebrina Gao, William Shen, and Tim Yan	December 12, 2025	November 7, 2026 (Nicktoons)
Part 2 of 3: Mikey and his brothers visit Rod's sister Maude, who owns the Null Group, but is oblivious to how science works. She attempts to extract mutagen blood from them, but they manage to escape, only to be kidnapped by Rod and Maude's brother Todd, who is head of an organization that wants to be mutants, going as far as eating Leatherhead, but they all escape while Rod frees himself from the clutches of his kidnappers and learns his father may have been involved.
24	12	"The Big Muck"	Rie Koga^{st} Kevin Molina-Ortiz^{su}	Matthew Bass	Kyra Pescador, Andy Pineda, and Ed Raza	December 12, 2025	November 14, 2026 (Nicktoons)
Part 3 of 3: Mikey and Rod confront Underwood, who had obtained the mutagen, which Rod confesses to be fake before Maude shows mutagen the Null Group extracted from Leatherhead's scale that Todd obtained. Unsure of whether which one is real or not, Underwood consumes both and ends up turning into an unstable mutant, and consumes Maude and Todd. With help from his brothers, Mikey assists Rod in making more fake mutagen to stop Underwood's rampage with Rod allowing himself to be consumed in order to insert more fake mutagen, ultimately causing Underwood to explode, freeing all three siblings, who reconcile. Rod takes over his father's company, Maude becomes a barista, and Todd becomes a protector of endangered species. Still unsure of who kidnapped him, Rod, while watching Mikey's performance, discovers it was the comedy team.

- ^st Storyboard director
- ^su Supervising director

== Cast and characters ==
=== Main ===
- Micah Abbey as Donatello: The tech guru of the Turtles who uses a bō staff in combat. He has a liking for anime and video games.
- Shamon Brown Jr. as Michelangelo: The fun-loving jokester of Turtles who uses nunchucks. He desires to be a stand-up comedian.
- Nicolas Cantu as Leonardo: The leader of the Turtles who uses two katana. He has a romantic interest in April O'Neil.
- Brady Noon as Raphael: The muscle of the Turtles who uses a pair of sai. He has a "fight first, ask questions later" attitude.
- Ayo Edebiri as April O'Neil: A high school news reporter and human friend of the Turtles.
- Splinter is a mutant rat and the adoptive father and mentor of the Turtles. He was previously voiced by Jackie Chan in Mutant Mayhem, but only speaks in a gibberish language called "vermin" in Tales. Fred Tatasciore provides the voice and is credited as "Splinter Vermin".

=== Recurring ===
- Craig Robinson as Spuds: A gym owner who is a member of the Purple Dragons.
- Christopher Mintz-Plasse as Pigeon Pete: A mutant pigeon and member of the Mutanimals. He was mutated by a sample of Michelangelo's blood.
- Rose Byrne as Leatherhead: A mutant alligator and member of the Mutanimals, a group that allies with the Turtles. She used to be a member of Superfly's gang, the main villain in Mutant Mayhem.
- Austin Post as Ray Fillet: A mutant manta ray and member of the Mutanimals. He used to be a member of Superfly's gang and mostly communicates by singing his name.
- Natasia Demetriou as Wingnut: A mutant bat and the mechanical genius of the Mutanimals. She used to be a member of Superfly's gang and shares a close bond with Donatello.
- Alex Hirsch as Scumbug: A mutant cockroach who is Splinter's love interest.
- Carlin James and Jamila Velasquez as Hun and Angel: Members of the Purple Dragons.
- Seth Rogen as Bebop: A mutant warthog and former member of Superfly's gang.
- Peter Stormare as Tokka: A mutant snapping turtle.
- Ralph Ineson as Rahzar: A mutant wolf.
- Kieran Culkin as Dr. Jordan Perry: The creator of Rahzar, Tokka, Scale Tail, Antrax, Wyrm, and Mutant Omega who seeks to stabilize their mutation
- Fred Armisen as Scratch: A mutant cat who hates Splinter for scratching his eye.
- Pete Davidson as Rod Underwood: A lazy rich kid and son of Rod Underwood Sr. who befriends Michelangelo and desires to be a mutant.
- Alanna Ubach as Bishop: A brilliant inventor who is a part of the Earth Protective Force.
- Heidi Gardner and Ike Barinholtz as Maude and Todd Underwood: Rod's older siblings

== Production ==
=== Development ===
In July 2023, Variety reported that a film sequel and two-season 2D animated television series follow-up for Teenage Mutant Ninja Turtles: Mutant Mayhem had been greenlit. The series, titled Tales of the Teenage Mutant Ninja Turtles, was reported to act as a bridge between Mutant Mayhem and the film sequel, which has been scheduled to release in theaters in 2026. Christopher Yost and Alan Wan were announced as executive producers and showrunners. In an August 2024 interview released in promotion of the first season, Yost said that he was unsure if there would be a second season though added that the team had plenty of ideas for one. In the January 2025 issue of Toy World Magazine, Paramount confirmed that season 2 would debut later that year on Paramount+ and Nickelodeon. In November 2025, it was announced the series was cancelled alongside Dora stemming from management shifts caused by the Paramount-Skydance merger, and the second season would be its final season.

=== Casting and voice recording ===
The voice cast of the series includes Micah Abbey, Shamon Brown Jr., Nicolas Cantu, and Brady Noon reprising their voice roles from Mutant Mayhem as the four Turtles, and Ayo Edebiri reprising her role as April O'Neil. Rose Bryne, Seth Rogen, Austin Post, and Pete Davidson reprised their voice roles from the film and the first season of the series. Kieran Culkin, Craig Robinson, Ralph Ineson, Peter Stormare, Fred Armisen, Heidi Gardner, and Ike Barinholtz joined the cast as new characters.

Unlike with Mutant Mayhem, in which Abbey, Brown, Cantu, and Noon recorded their voice roles together, for Tales, they recorded independently from one another. The actors felt that the decision affected the way they performed and helped them dig deeper into their respective characters. Splinter, who was previously voiced by Jackie Chan in Mutant Mayhem, only speaks in a gibberish language called "vermin" in Tales. Fred Tatasciore provides the voice and is credited as "Splinter Vermin".

== Release ==
The season was released on Paramount+ on December 12, 2025.

== Reception ==
=== Critical response ===
Brian VanHooker of Polygon opined that the second season was a big step up from the first for its shift to character-focused story arcs, while still retaining the stronger qualities of its predecessor. He expressed great disappointment at the show's early cancellation and apprehension for the Mutant Mayhem iteration's future.

=== Accolades ===
Award	Date of ceremony	Category	Recipient(s)	Result	Ref.
Annie Awards	February 21, 2026	Best TV/Media – Children	Tales of the Teenage Mutant Ninja Turtles (for "Rise of the Night Ninja")	Nominated	
Annie Awards	February 21, 2026	Outstanding Achievement for Directing in an Animated Television / Broadcast Production	JJ Conway and Kevin Molina-Ortiz (for "Rise of the Night Ninja")	Nominated	
Annie Awards	February 21, 2026	Outstanding Achievement for Storyboarding in an Animated Television / Broadcast Production	Richard Chi, Matthew Kim, Sheldon Vella, Lyndsay Simpson (for "Rise of the Night Ninja")	Nominated	
