= Tales of the Teenage Mutant Ninja Turtles season 1 =

Season of television series

Tales of the Teenage Mutant Ninja Turtles
- Season 1
- Promotional poster
- Showrunners: Christopher Yost; Alan Wan
- Starring: Micah Abbey; Shamon Brown Jr.; Nicolas Cantu; Brady Noon; Ayo Edebiri
- No. of episodes: 12

Release
- Original network: Paramount+
- Original release: August 9, 2024

Season chronology
- Next → Season 2

The first season of the American animated television series Tales of the Teenage Mutant Ninja Turtles is based on the Teenage Mutant Ninja Turtles characters by Peter Laird and Kevin Eastman. Serving as a spin-off of the 2023 film Mutant Mayhem, it follows the Turtles as they navigate their dual lives as both teenagers and heroes in New York City. The season was produced by Nickelodeon Animation Studio, Point Grey Pictures, and animation studio Titmouse, with Christopher Yost and Alan Wan serving as showrunners.

Micah Abbey, Shamon Brown Jr., Nicolas Cantu, Brady Noon, and Ayo Edebiri reprise their voice roles from Mutant Mayhem. During production on the film, its producers Seth Rogen and Evan Goldberg were granted approval to develop a canon streaming television series. Yost was approached by Rogen, and Wan joined the production soon after. The series was announced in July 2023, with Yost and Wan attached as showrunners. The showrunners used the film as a guiding map in development.

The season was released on Paramount+ on August 9, 2024, and consists of 12 episodes. It received positive reviews from critics for its voice performances, animation, and action sequences, as well as five Annie Award nominations. A second season was picked up alongside the first and debuted on Nickelodeon and Paramount+ in 2025.

== Episodes ==
No. overall	No. in season	Title	Directed by	Written by	Original release date	Nickelodeon air date
1	"Leo Nardo Stands Alone!"	Kalvin Lee^{st} Colin Heck^{su}	Christopher Yost	Eleisiya Arocha, Gabriela Camarillo, Ian Higginbotham and Kenji Ono	August 9, 2024	February 17, 2025
Part 1 of 6: Two months after defeating Superfly, (Note: As depicted in Teenage Mutant Ninja Turtles: Mutant Mayhem (2023)) the Turtles—Michelangelo, Leonardo, Raphael, and Donatello—are now revered as heroes by New York City. On their way to a costume party, the Turtles encounter a villain, Bishop, who has an agenda against mutants. Their plan to defeat her backfires, resulting in their separation across the city. Leo winds up in an alleyway and is chased by one of Bishop's mutant-hunting robots called a "Mechazoid." After losing the Mechazoid, Leo makes his way to the party and meets up with April O'Neil. Together, they badly damage the Mechazoid. Meanwhile, Bishop watches on monitors as the other Turtles are menaced by Mechazoids.
2	"Mikey Does the Right Thing"	Kenji Ono^{st} Colin Heck^{su}	Matthew Bass	Sebrina Gao, Jerry Gaylord and Laura Gille	August 9, 2024	February 17, 2025
Part 2 of 6: Michelangelo and Rod, Bishop's assistant whom Michelangelo saved after a Mechazoid mistook him for a mutant (due to his mismatched eyes) and attacked him, flee from the robot in a garbage truck. After losing the Mechazoid, Mikey learns that Rod's father funds Bishop and asks Rod to contact him to stop her. Rod agrees on the condition that Mikey turns him into a mutant. The pair head for the New York City Zoo, where Michelangelo prepares to mutate Rod. After some mishaps with night security and a bear, Mikey injects Rod with a decoy sample of his blood. The Mechazoid returns while Rod wrestles Mikey for a vial containing the actual sample of his blood. The vial falls into a waste bin and is consumed by a pigeon. Mikey names the pigeon, who's now a mutant, Pete and defeats the Mechazoid. Rod finds out his cellphone was broken in battle, preventing him from calling his dad, so he instead directs Michelangelo to Bishop's factory to face her.
3	"Raph Thinks It Through"	Jennifer Bennett^{st} Colin Heck^{su}	Christopher Yost	Peter Foltz, Ian Higginbotham, Kam Kalambay, Lyndsay Simpson and Jaxon Sorby	August 9, 2024	February 18, 2025
Part 3 of 6: Raphael is pulled out of the water by members of the street gang, the Purple Dragons. After passing out, Raph wakes up in the back of a truck but is soon knocked back into unconsciousness by a bigger member of the Purple Dragons, Hun. Raphael then wakes up again, chained to the floor in a chicken-plucking factory with Hun watching him, and the two are soon joined by Angel and additional Purple Dragons members. After some failed escape attempts by Raph, Kitsune, the leader of the Purple Dragons, walks into the factory and tells Raph she plans to sell him. Raph distracts the Purple Dragons by telling them chicken-related jokes right before a Mechazoid busts into the factory. In an attempt to kill Raph, the Mechazoid accidentally frees him from ropes. Raph, Hun, and Angel defeat the Mechazoid together, and out of a token of goodwill, Hun and Angel let Raph go. Raph proceeds to go and help his brothers on Angel's motorcycle.
4	"Donnie Hangs Tough"	Kalvin Lee^{st} Colin Heck^{su}	Alex Hanson	Eleisiya Arocha, Gabriela Camarillo, Lyndsay Simpson and Tim Yan	August 9, 2024	February 18, 2025
Part 4 of 6: Donatello, being pursued by a Mechazoid, heads into the New York City Subway to lose it, where he runs into a pair of police officers. Donnie, in handcuffs at the subway police station, attempts to explain his situation to the officers, who are more interested in the fame they could achieve from this encounter. The Mechazoid busts into the station, and Don, after freeing himself, heads off. The Mechazoid eventually gets stuck in a turnstile, leading to Bishop taking control of all the screens in the subway to communicate with Don who heads into an occupied train, and the Mechazoid goes after him. Donatello attempts to tell the driver the situation while also using a laptop he borrowed from the officers to hack into Bishop's admin system. Bishop gains remote control of the train and disables the brakes in an attempt to crash it. Don fights off the Mechazoid and shuts down its systems using the laptop, and the train brakes right before it could collide with the end of the tunnel. Don begins to rebuild and reprogram the fallen Mechazoid.
5	"Bishop Makes Her Move!"	Jennifer Bennett^{st} Colin Heck^{su}	Haley Mancini	Ian Higginbotham, Jaxon Sorby and Jasmine Suggs	August 9, 2024	February 19, 2025
Part 5 of 6: Some time back, Bishop convinces multimillionaire Roderick Underwood Sr. to invest in her company, "Bishop Robotics", on the condition she employs his son Rod. One day while Bishop and Rod work in their lab, Superfly's giant hybrid form destroys the building during his rampage in New York City, crushing Mechazoid Alpha, dedicated to Bishop's sister Elena. Bishop deems all mutants a threat and begins creating Mechazoids to kill them. A couple months later, Bishop lures the Turtles to the shipyards and ambushes them with Mechazoids. Leonardo devises a plan to gather the Mechazoids at the center and crush them with a shipping container using a crane. Bishop learns the containers are full of fireworks and tries to stop them. Leo cuts the crane's chains, causing an explosion that scatters Rod and the Turtles. Bishop assumes the Turtles are dead, but soon discovers they survived and defeated her Mechazoids. Knowing the Turtles are coming for her, she prepares for battle.
6	"Night of the Mechazoids"	Kenji Ono^{st} Colin Heck^{su}	Kevin Shinick	Sebrina Gao, Jerry Gaylord and Laura Gille	August 9, 2024	February 20, 2025
Part 6 of 6: The Turtles make it to Bishop's factory, reunite, and face Bishop and her Mechazoids. The Mechazoids, now evolved, identify all life as having the potential to mutate and thus a threat. Bishop tries to stop the Mechazoids, but they begin to attack her. The Turtles save Bishop, and Donatello's reprogrammed Mechazoid, now called Metalhead, comes to their aid. Bishop and the Turtles declare a truce and, with the help of April and Rod, devise a plan to generate a large electrical pulse to shut down the Mechazoids. With the help of Pigeon Pete, they succeed, although Metalhead is destroyed in battle. Bishop decides to turn herself in to the Earth Protection Force (EPF), who, impressed by her robotics, decide to recruit her instead in their fight against mutants. The Turtles forgo the costume party and head back to their sewer lair.
7	"Raph vs. Water"	Kalvin Lee^{st} Colin Heck^{su}	Matthew Bass	Phil Allora, Lyndsay Simpson and Tim Yan	August 9, 2024	December 13, 2025
Part 1 of 6: The Turtles and Splinter, along with their mutant allies, are stuck in the sewer lair due to a storm. Splinter insists the Turtles go out anyway and pairs each of them with one or two mutants. Raph heads off with Scumbug and Ray Fillet to investigate a jackhammer noise nearby and finds a construction worker, Steven, who explains he was instructed to dig a hole to the surface by a group of mutants. They are then attacked by mutant sea anemones who learned speech from television commercials. After defeating the anemones, Steven tells Raph that some mutants associated with the anemones plan to destroy the seawall and flood New York City. Three new mutants arrive, and the anemones explain the situation to them, while Raph and the others eavesdrop on the discussion. Raph decides to find and warn his brothers of this new threat.
8	"Mikey Takes Charge"	Jennifer Bennett^{st} Colin Heck^{su}	Alex Hanson	Ian Higginbotham, Jasmine Goggins and Jaxon Sorby	August 9, 2024	December 13, 2025
Part 2 of 6: Mikey and Genghis Frog go on a supply run at a convenience store and walk in on a robbery by Purple Dragons members Hun, Angel, and Cane. During their battle, the ground begins to shake and a sinkhole forms in the store floor while a vending machine blocks the exit. Rising water in the hole contains an unidentified creature. Mikey advises everyone to climb on top of the shelves. He soon discovers the creature is a mutant eel, Lee the Eel, who has electrified the water. After battling for some time, Mikey devises a plan to get Lee stuck in cables dangling from the ceiling, de-electrifying the water. The plan succeeds, and everyone exits the store. Mikey heads back in for Lee, only to find she has escaped.
9	"Splinter and April Fight a Goldfish"	Kenji Ono^{st} Colin Heck^{su}	Haley Mancini	Sebrina Gao, Jerry Gaylord and Laura Gille	August 9, 2024	December 20, 2025
Part 3 of 6: Noticing that the sewer is flooding as a result of the ongoing storm, April checks in on Splinter and the Turtles. At the sewer lair, April tries to convince Splinter to leave, but they are soon attacked by a mutant goldfish named Goldfin. Splinter and April capture Goldfin and question him. Goldfin explains that he and his gang the "East River Three" as well as their associates the Anenemies were regular sea animals until Superfly's machine mutated them. Goldfin adds that they desire a home. A huge wave of water washes away Splinter, and mutant sea anemones tie up April. Splinter returns with an army of rats and saves April, but Goldfin escapes. Splinter and April then head off after Goldfin.
10	"Donnie Goes Deep"	Kenji Ono^{st} Colin Heck^{su}	Matthew Bass	Phil Allora, Lyndsay Simpson and Tim Yan	August 9, 2024	December 20, 2025
Part 4 of 6: Donnie and Wingnut are on their way to fix the sewer lair's power supply when Lee the Eel dashes through the sewer tunnel, forming a hole that plunges them into the lower levels. They notice rising water and an alligator, which they assume to be a de-mutated Leatherhead. After clashes with the alligator, Don tries to connect with it, still thinking it's Leatherhead. The real Leatherhead then arrives, revealing the alligator they are fighting is different. Don, Wingnut, and Leatherhead together take care of the alligator and an additional one. The trio head for the exit and run into Raph, Scumbug, and Ray Fillet. In a flashback side story upon being rejected by the friends and family they knew before their mutation, the East River Three devise a plan to retrieve the giant pearl that was taken by humans from their East River home. Goldfin decides to ask crime boss Bad Bernie for help.
11	"Leonardo Saddles Up"	Jennifer Bennett^{st} Colin Heck^{su}	Elise Roncace	Ian Higginbotham, Jerry Gaylord, Jasmine Goggins and Jaxon Sorby	August 9, 2024	December 27, 2025
Part 5 of 6: Leo chases Pigeon Pete through New York City while a police officer named Hauser, who hates pigeons, tails them. They encounter Mustang Sally, a mutant seahorse and member of the East River Three, at a pump station. Leo and Mustang Sally engage in battle, but the pump station is soon surrounded by armed police officers led by Officer Hauser. As the building is ambushed, Pete speaks for the first time, and with Leo, escapes the pump station just before Sally successfully takes it down and floods the Natural History Museum.
12	"The Pearl"	Alan Wan^{st} Colin Heck^{su}	Alex Hanson	Sebrina Gao, Laura Gille, Chris Luc and Kevin Molina-Ortiz	August 9, 2024	December 27, 2025
Part 6 of 6: Bad Bernie convinces Goldfin to betray his friends for riches. The East River Three retrieves the pearl from the flooded Natural History Museum. Donatello entrusts the Turtles' mutant allies with defusing a bomb set by Goldfin in the sewers. The Turtles reunite and, with Pigeon Pete and Genghis Frog, fight the East River Three at the museum. Goldfin collapses the museum and escapes with the pearl, leaving everyone behind. The Turtles pursue Goldfin to the pier. Goldfin gives the pearl to Bernie on a boat, but the Turtles, April, Splinter, and an army of rats interrupt them. The Turtles and Splinter defeat Goldfin just as Lee the Eel and Mustang Sally realize his betrayal. Goldfin pushes everyone but Bernie overboard and flees with him on the boat. Ray Fillet brings the bomb from the sewer, and the Turtles and allies place it on the boat, stopping Bernie and Goldfin. The pearl is returned to the East River, Lee and Sally search for a new home, and Bernie and Goldfin survive the boat explosion.

- ^st Storyboard director
- ^su Supervising director

== Cast and characters ==
=== Main ===
- Micah Abbey as Donatello: The tech guru of the Turtles who uses a bō staff in combat. He has a liking for anime and video games.
- Shamon Brown Jr. as Michelangelo: The fun-loving jokester of Turtles who uses nunchucks. He desires to be a stand-up comedian.
- Nicolas Cantu as Leonardo: The leader of the Turtles who uses two katana. He has a romantic interest in April O'Neil.
- Brady Noon as Raphael: The muscle of the Turtles who uses a pair of sai. He has a "fight first, ask questions later" attitude.
- Ayo Edebiri as April O'Neil: A high school news reporter and human friend of the Turtles.
- Splinter is a mutant rat and the adoptive father and mentor of the Turtles. He was previously voiced by Jackie Chan in Mutant Mayhem, but only speaks in a gibberish language called "vermin" in Tales. Fred Tatasciore provides the voice and is credited as "Splinter Vermin".

=== Recurring ===
- Rose Byrne as Leatherhead: A mutant alligator and member of the Mutanimals, a group that allies with the Turtles. She used to be a member of Superfly's gang, the main villain in Mutant Mayhem.
- Natasia Demetriou as Wingnut: A mutant bat and the mechanical genius of the Mutanimals. She used to be a member of Superfly's gang and shares a close bond with Donatello.
- Austin Post as Ray Fillet: A mutant manta ray and member of the Mutanimals. He used to be a member of Superfly's gang and mostly communicates by singing his name.
- Amad Jackson as Genghis Frog: A mutant frog who wields a battle axe. He used to be a member of Superfly's gang. Jackson replaces Hannibal Burress from Mutant Mayhem.
- Alex Hirsch as Scumbug: A mutant cockroach and love interest of Splinter. She used to be a member of Superfly's gang.
- Alanna Ubach as Bishop: A brilliant inventor who believes mutants are a threat to humanity. She is recruited by the Earth Protection Force (EPF).
- Pete Davidson as Rod: A lazy rich kid who desires to be a mutant.
- Christopher Mintz-Plasse as Pigeon Pete: A mutant pigeon and member of the Mutanimals. He was mutated by a sample of Michelangelo's blood.
- Timothy Olyphant as Goldfin: A mutant goldfish and leader of the villainous group the East River Three. The group was mutated when Superfly's machine fell into the ocean in Mutant Mayhem.
- Jillian Bell as Lee the Eel: A mutant eel and member of the East River Three.
- Danny Trejo as Mustang Sally: A mutant seahorse and member of the East River Three.
- Carlin James and Jamila Velasquez as Hun and Angel: Members of a street gang called the Purple Dragons.

== Production ==
=== Development ===
According to Christopher Yost, during the middle of production on Teenage Mutant Ninja Turtles: Mutant Mayhem (2023), producers Seth Rogen and Evan Goldberg were granted approval to develop a canon streaming television series. Yost was then approached to see if he would be interested in meeting Rogen, and after agreeing, the two discussed what the series could be. Alan Wan was brought in to work with Yost. Between the two, they had experience working on the 2003 Turtles series, the 2012 Turtles series, and the 2018 series Rise of the Teenage Mutant Ninja Turtles.

In July 2023, Variety reported that a film sequel and a 2D animated television series follow-up for Mutant Mayhem had been greenlit. The series, titled Tales of the Teenage Mutant Ninja Turtles, was reported to act as a bridge between Mutant Mayhem and the film sequel, which has been scheduled to release in theaters in 2026. Yost and Wan were announced as executive producers and showrunners. Lukas Williams was set to oversee production for Point Grey Pictures which co-produces with Nickelodeon Animation Studio. Production for Nickelodeon was overseen by Claudia Spinelli, Senior Vice President of Nickelodeon Animation, and Nikki Price, Director of Development and Executive in Charge of Production.

=== Casting and voice recording ===
Along with the series' announcement in July 2023, Micah Abbey, Shamon Brown Jr., Nicolas Cantu, and Brady Noon were confirmed to reprise their voice roles from Mutant Mayhem as the four Turtles. Ayo Edebiri was later confirmed to reprise her role as April O'Neil in February 2024. In June 2024, Alanna Ubach and Pete Davidson were confirmed to guest star in the series as Bishop and Rod respectively. In July 2024, Rose Byrne, Natasia Demetriou, and Post Malone were confirmed to reprise their roles as Leatherhead, Wingnut, and Ray Fillet. Christopher Mintz-Plasse, Timothy Olyphant, Jillian Bell, and Danny Trejo were announced to play new characters, Pigeon Pete, Goldfin, Lee the Eel, and Mustang Sally. Later that month, it was announced that Carlin James and Jamila Velasquez voiced Hun and Angel.

Unlike with Mutant Mayhem, in which Abbey, Brown, Cantu, and Noon recorded their voice roles together, for Tales, they recorded independently from one another. The actors felt that the decision affected the way they performed and helped them dig deeper into their respective characters. Splinter, who was previously voiced by Jackie Chan in Mutant Mayhem, only speaks in a gibberish language called "vermin" in Tales. Fred Tatasciore provides the voice and is credited as "Splinter Vermin". Ubach was unaware of what her character, Bishop, looked like until the first day of voice recording. Upon seeing a picture, she instantly knew what direction she wanted to take her performance in.

=== Writing and animation ===
Unlike previous Turtles series, which were developed as television shows first, Tales is a continuation of a film. This meant the showrunners had to use Mutant Mayhem as a guiding map in development. Just like with the film, the showrunners emphasized the teenage aspect of the Turtles. The series is presented from the Turtles point of view. Yost said that they sometimes think of it as "Tales by the Teenage Mutant Ninja Turtles", adding that there was a bit of an unreliable narrator element to it. Yost frequently watched the film Superbad (2007) in an effort to capture the teenage voice for the series. The showrunners described the world presented in the series as being more grounded than those of previous incarnations of Turtles.

The series sees the Turtles being split up and having to work alone. This idea was conceived by Yost and Wan during discussions with Rogen and Goldberg early during the series' development as a way to distinguish from previous Turtles series by exploring each Turtle's personality and growth outside of their relationships with each other. Yost wanted to do a different take on Bishop, a character who first appeared in the 2003 Turtles series. In addition, he sought for the Turtles to deal with a villain very different from Superfly, the villain of Mutant Mayhem, and wanted robots to be involved. Their end goal was to create a version of the character that was unique from the original 2003 take, but one that still ended up in a "weirdly similar place". The team made efforts to integrate April O'Neil into the stories and make sure she did not feel too distant from the Turtles.

Independent animation studio Titmouse provides the animation for the series. Like with Mutant Mayhem, which took an unconventional approach to its CG animation, Wan wanted the series to take an unconventional 2D animation look. He wanted to capture a "punk rock" feeling and described the style as rough and raw. The showrunner felt the series' more crude art style helped to distinguish it from its more clean-looking action cartoon peers. Wan also felt that the art style paid homage to the original Turtles comics by Kevin Eastman and Peter Laird. The series uses comic book drawings by Leonardo as a framing device, which the showrunners also added as an homage to the comics. For the action sequences, the team drew inspiration from various iterations of Turtles, including Mutant Mayhem, the 1990s live-action films, and Rise of the Teenage Mutant Ninja Turtles.

== Release ==
Tales of the Teenage Mutant Ninja Turtles debuted on Paramount+ on August 9, 2024, with all of its ordered 12 episodes. The first season was released on DVD and Blu-ray on November 12, 2024, by Paramount Home Entertainment.

=== Marketing ===
Two teaser trailers were released on February 8, 2024 and April 25, 2024, respectively. An official trailer was released during the IGN Live event on June 7, 2024. Becca Caddy of TechRadar praised the humor and visuals, and felt that the series would "deliver the beloved mix of colorful action, sharp wit, and humor" associated with the franchise. Wes Davis of The Verge said that the series looks to be "just as gorgeous as the 3D-animated movie it sprang from", and Joey Paur of GeekTyrant remarked that "this looks like it's going to be a totally radical show!" The series' title sequence debuted at San Diego Comic-Con in July 2024. James Whitbrook of Gizmodo called it a "really cool, stylish riff on transitioning the film's aesthetic to a 2D form". A first look at action figures by Playmates Toys was unveiled in March 2024.

== Reception ==
=== Critical response ===
Rotten Tomatoes reported 100% approval with an average rating of 8.0/10 based on 9 reviews. Tyler Robertson of IGN gave the series an 8 out of 10 rating, praising the voice performances, animation, and action but criticizing the pacing and "downgrade" in the score and soundtrack. They concluded that while it does not reach the heights of Mutant Mayhem, it still retained many of its best elements. Mike Thomas of Collider gave the series an 8 out of 10 rating and commended its performances and character work. He however criticized the pacing and occasionally stiff animation, comparing the latter unfavorably to Mutant Mayhem and Rise of the Teenage Mutant Ninja Turtles. Tim Stevens of The Spool gave the series a 7.2 out of 10 rating, referring to it as a "decent Saturday morning-type spinoff of Mutant Mayhem". He commended the action sequences and voice performances but ultimately felt that the series was a step down from its film predecessor.

Angie Han of The Hollywood Reporter referred to the series as a "worthy follow-up" to Mutant Mayhem. She commended the animation, action, character work, and familial themes, though felt the show was limited by its younger skewing target audience. Manuel Betancourt of The A.V. Club gave high praise to the show for its entertainment value and character work for each of the four Turtles. Sayantan Gayen of Comic Book Resources gave the series a 9 out of 10 rating, praising it for its worldbuilding, character work, animation, and heart. He felt it retained Mutant Mayhem's best elements and gave the franchise a solid foundation to stand on and build upon.

=== Accolades ===
Award	Date of ceremony	Category	Recipient(s)	Result	Ref.
Annie Awards	February 8, 2025	Outstanding Achievement for Character Design in an Animated Television / Broadcast Production	Rustam Hasanov (for "Night of the Mechazoids")	Nominated	
Annie Awards	February 8, 2025	Outstanding Achievement for Directing in an Animated Television / Broadcast Production	Alan Wan, Colin Heck (for "The Pearl")	Nominated	
Annie Awards	February 8, 2025	Outstanding Achievement for Storyboarding in an Animated Television / Broadcast Production	Laura Gille, Sebrina Gao, Kevin Molina-Ortiz (for "The Pearl")	Nominated	
Annie Awards	February 8, 2025	Outstanding Achievement for Voice Acting in an Animated Television / Broadcast Production	Ayo Edebiri (for "Splinter and April Fight a Goldfish")	Nominated	
Annie Awards	February 8, 2025	Outstanding Achievement for Editorial in an Animated Television / Broadcast Production	Caleb Yoder (for "The Pearl")	Nominated	
Children's & Family Emmy Awards	March 1–2, 2026	Outstanding Individual Achievement in Animation – Color	Mark Anthony Mohamed	Won	
Hollywood Professional Association Awards	November 7, 2024	HPA Award for Outstanding Color Grading – Animated Episode or Non-Theatrical Feature	Ara Thomassian (Keep Me Posted) (for "Night of the Mechazoids")	Nominated	
