= List of programs broadcast by Nickelodeon (Asia) =

Nickelodeon is a children's and teenagers' television channel available on many pay-TV networks across Asia.

== Current programming ==
=== Animated ===
Nickelodeon Originals

Title	Running period	Current season	Notes
SpongeBob SquarePants	7 April 2001 – present	15	
The Loud House	20 May 2016 – present	9	
The Patrick Star Show	20 May 2022 – present	2	
Rock Paper Scissors	29 April 2024 – present	1	
Max & the Midknights	14 October 2024 – present	1	
Wylde Pak	29 September 2025 – present	2	
Paramount+ Originals
Tales of the Teenage Mutant Ninja Turtles	5 October 2024 – present	1	
Nick Jr. Originals
Super Duper Bunny League	28 July 2025 – present	1	
Netflix Originals
Pinky Malinky	2 August 2026 – present	1	

Acquired programming

- Alvinnn!!! and the Chipmunks
- Best & Bester
- The Marsupilamis
- The Smurfs
- Sonic Prime

=== Live-action ===
Nickelodeon Originals

- Danger Force
- Henry Danger
- iCarly
- Sam & Cat
- That Girl Lay Lay
- The Thundermans: Undercover
- Victorious

== Former programming ==
=== Animated ===
Show	Running period
44 Cats	4 February 2019 – 28 August 2022
Aaahh!!! Real Monsters	1999 - 26 June 2011
The Adventures of Jimmy Neutron, Boy Genius	2003 – 22 December 2021
The Adventures of Kid Danger	3 August 2018 – 30 August 2024
Akis	2012
All Grown Up!	20 February 2004 - December 2018
The Angry Beavers	5 November 1998 – 30 June 2011
Animalia	2009 - 2011
As Told by Ginger	2002 - 11 December 2021
Avatar: The Last Airbender	15 June 2005 – 2 September 2024
Back at the Barnyard	7 January 2009 – 26 December 2020
Big Nate	14 November 2022 – 30 March 2024
Breadwinners	28 November 2014 – 28 August 2024
Bunsen Is a Beast	19 June 2017 – December 2019
The Casagrandes	25 March 2020 – 1 February 2026
CatDog	1999 - March 2019
Catscratch	7 January 2006 – 29 May 2011
ChalkZone	2003 – 28 August 2022
Chicken Stew	2010 - 2011
Chop Chop Ninja	November 2018 - 31 March 2021
Cingkus Blues	2012
Cracke	Unknown
Da Yu	25 June 2020 – 12 July 2020
Danny Phantom	4 September 2004 - 11 December 2021
Dorg Van Dango	4 December 2020 – 30 March 2024
Doug	5 November 1998 – 31 October 2011
Edgar & Ellen	2008 – 2011
El Tigre: The Adventures of Manny Rivera	2008 – 2013
The Fairly OddParents	2003 – August 2024
The Fairly OddParents: A New Wish	26 May 2025 – 31 October 2025
Fanboy & Chum Chum	17 April 2010 – 29 August 2024
Four Eyes!	Unknown: 2005
Frankenstein's Cat	1 September 2008 - 2009
Future Card Buddy Fight	February 2014 - 2015
Gawayn	3 August 2009 - 2010
Get Blake!	30 March 2015 - 2016
Grossology	1 January 2008 - 2010
Growing Up Creepie	1 January 2008 - 2010
Gruff's Groove Box	2 November 2001 - 2003 (Original)
Harvey Beaks	8 June 2015 – October 2019
Hey Arnold!	1999 - December 2019
The Incredible Cheesy Adventures of Chez	Unknown: 2009
Invader Zim	2003 – 23 December 2020
It's Pony	18 May 2020 – November 2022
KaBlam!	Unknown: 1998 - 2003
Kamp Koral: SpongeBob's Under Years	28 March 2022 – 1 March 2025
Kampung Boy	Unknown: 1998
Kappa Mikey	2 September 2006 – 2010
Keke's Story	2010 - 2011
Kid vs. Kat	4 May 2009 - August 2017
Kung Fu Panda: Legends of Awesomeness	23 January 2012 – 30 August 2024
Lalaloopsy	2014 - 2015
Little Spirou	January 2013 - March 2013
The Legend of Korra	28 September 2012 – March 2016
Lego City Adventures	22 September 2019 – 10 March 2023
Lego Friends	17 June 2019 - April 2022
Lego Jurassic World: Legend of Isla Nublar	July 2020 – 28 August 2022
Littlest Pet Shop	November 2017 - 2018 (Nickelodeon Philippines only)
Lola & Virginia	19 February 2007 - 2009
Lucky Fred	18 February 2012 - 2013
Mia and Me	1 July 2013 - 2014
Middlemost Post	1 August 2022 – March 2024
The Mighty B!	4 August 2008 – 26 June 2011
Monster High	1 April 2023 – 29 August 2025
Monsters vs. Aliens	28 November 2013 - 2015
Monsuno	Unknown: 2013
My Dad the Rock Star	Unknown: 2004
My Life as a Teenage Robot	2004 – 2011
My Little Pony: Friendship Is Magic	August 2017 - March 2021 (Nickelodeon Philippines only)
Mysticons	October 2017 - December 2019
Oggy and the Cockroaches	1 January 2015 - April 2021
Oh Yeah! Cartoons	Unknown: 1999 – 2007
Ollie's Pack	15 February 2021 – 29 March 2024
Pat & Stan	January 2010 – 30 June 2011
Pelswick	Unknown: 2002
The Penguins of Madagascar	12 June 2009 – 30 August 2024
Pig Goat Banana Cricket	9 September 2016 – December 2019
Planet Sheen	30 April 2011 – 31 August 2024
Pleasant Goat and Big Big Wolf (Note: https://www.campaignasia.com/article/nickelodeon-asia-launches-chinatoon/84j3mso9sylw1w3ve2dkpk7tdu)	5 July 2009 – 2010
PopPixie	2012
Rabbids Invasion	11 January 2014 – 1 September 2021
Rainbow Butterfly Unicorn Kitty	15 May 2019 – 27 April 2024
Random! Cartoons	August 2010 - 29 May 2011
Regal Academy	21 November 2016 – 12 February 2021
The Ren & Stimpy Show	Unknown – 2009
Ricky Sprocket	8 November 2007 - 2009
Rise of the Teenage Mutant Ninja Turtles	24 September 2018 – 27 August 2024
Robot and Monster	25 March 2013 - 2015
Rocket Monkeys	22 March 2013 – 10 May 2015
Rocket Power	Unknown: August 2000 – 2010
Rocko's Modern Life	5 November 1998 – December 2018
Rugrats	1998 - November 2019
Rugrats (2021)	13 June 2022 – 14 March 2026
Rugrats Pre-School Daze	2005 - 2011
Sandra the Fairytale Detective	14 September 2009 - 2010
Sanjay and Craig	6 September 2013 – 30 August 2024
Sharkdog	8 July 2024 – 25 August 2024
Skyland	Unknown: 2008
Star Trek: Prodigy	13 April 2022 – 30 June 2023
Ultimate Top Plate!	Unknown: 2014
T.U.F.F. Puppy	18 August 2011 – 31 August 2024
Tak and the Power of Juju	22 July 2008 - 2009
Team Galaxy	6 January 2007 - 2009
Teenage Mutant Ninja Turtles (2003)	2013
Teenage Mutant Ninja Turtles (2012)	16 November 2012 – 2 September 2024
Tobot	28 June 2015 - 2016
Tomato Twins (Note: https://vimeo.com/273596122)	2002 - unknown
ToonMarty	June 2017 - October 2018
Top Wing	2018 - August 2024
Totally Spies!	2012 - 2018
Transformers: Earthspark	28 November 2022 – 7 December 2025
Transformers: Rescue Bots	2019 - 2020 (Nickelodeon Philippines only)
Transformers: Rescue Bots Academy	2020 - May 2021 (Nickelodeon Philippines only)
Trollz	Unknown: 2006
The Twisted Timeline of Sammy & Raj	6 February 2023 – 30 June 2024
Wara!Store	15 June 2013 - August 2013
Wayside	6 October 2007 - 2008
Welcome to the Wayne	8 January 2018 - March 2018
The Wild Thornberrys	Unknown: 1999 - December 2018
Winx Club	November 2011 - August 2024
The X's	15 July 2006 - 2008
Yakkity Yak	Unknown: 2004
Zevo-3	2013 - 2014
Zokie of Planet Ruby	2 September 2024 – 4 October 2024

=== Live-action ===
Show	Running period
100 Deeds for Eddie McDowd	2005
100 Things to Do Before High School	11 January 2016 - 31 August 2025
Action League Now!	Unknown: 2003
The Adventures of Pete & Pete	Unknown: 2001 - 2002
All That	Unknown: 2001 - 2020
The Amanda Show	August 2001
America's Most Musical Family	25 April 2020 – August 2020
Are You Afraid of the Dark?	2005
Artzooka!	7 August 2010 - 2012
The Barbarian and the Troll	29 August 2022 – March 2024
Bella and the Bulldogs	6 April 2015(SG & PH); 11 April 2015(MY/IN) - 2016
Big Time Rush	May 2010 – 21 December 2021
The Brothers García	2003 - 2005
Clarissa Explains It All	5 November 1998 – 25 November 2011, Summer 2012
Cousin Skeeter	Unknown: 2001
Dance on Sunset	2007-2009
Dark Oracle	14 January 2006 - Unknown
Drake & Josh	August 2005 - 2010
Even Stevens	August 2002
Every Witch Way	July 2014 - 2016
The Fairly OddParents: Fairly Odder	5 September 2022 – 14 October 2022
Figure It Out	1998 – 2006
Figure It Out (season 5)	2013
Fred: The Show	9 August 2012 – October 2012
Game Shakers	4 December 2015– 31 August 2025
Genie in the House	6 July 2007 – 30 Sep 2011
Girls in Love	10 October 2004 - 2006
Global GUTS	Unknown: 2001 - 2002
Grachi	16 January 2012 – 11 September 2013 (Nickelodeon Philippines only)
The Haunted Hathaways	18 November 2013 – 29 October 2021
House of Anubis	1 April 2011 - 2013
How to Rock	8 March 2014 – December 2017
Hunter Street	1 May 2017 – 29 August 2025
I Am Frankie	23 October 2017(SG/MY/TH/IN); 28 October 2017(PH) - 2019
Just for Kicks	2006
Just Jordan	9 March 2009 - 2010
Kenan & Kel	Unknown: 2001 – March 2016
Legends of the Hidden Temple	Unknown: 2001
Life with Boys	15 March 2012 (PH) 22 March 2012 (SG/MY) - Summer 2012
Life with Derek	26 January 2007 - 2011
Lost in the West	16 November 2016
Make It Pop	31 August 2015 – December 2018
Marvin Marvin	31 May 2013 – 31 October 2013
Massive Monster Mayhem	24 February 2018 - 2018
Max & Shred	1 December 2014 – 10 May 2015
Me TV	1998 - 2001
Mr. Meaty	5 February 2007 - Unknown
My Brother and Me	August 2001 - 2002
The Naked Brothers Band	2008 - 2009
Naturally, Sadie	21 May 2005 - 2009
Ned's Declassified School Survival Guide	12 November 2005 - 2012
The Nick Cannon Show	2003
Nickelodeon's Spyders	2021
Nickelodeon's Unfiltered	19 December 2020 – 2021
Nicky, Ricky, Dicky & Dawn	5 January 2015 – 30 August 2025
Noah Knows Best	August 2001 - 2002
The Other Kingdom	29 August 2016 – October 2017
Rank the Prank	27 March 2017 (PH) 24 April 2017 (SG/TW/HK)
Ride	24 October 2016 - 2017
Rock Island Mysteries	1 October 2024 – 29 August 2025
Romeo!	Unknown: 2004 - 2005
Scaredy Camp	2003
School of Rock	7 October 2016 – 30 August 2025
Side Hustle	22 May 2021 – 28 August 2022
SoNick	March 2002 - 2005
Supah Ninjas	14 November 2011 - 2012
Taina	2003
Talia in the Kitchen	16 May 2016 (PH & SG) - 2017
Talia in the Kitchen	23 May 2016 (MY/TH/IN) - 2017
The Thundermans	31 March 2014 – 2025
The Troop	March 2010 - 29 May 2011
The Really Loud House	1 October 2023 – 31 August 2025
True Jackson, VP	16 November 2009 - 2014
Tyler Perry's Young Dylan	5 August 2024 – 24 January 2026
Unfabulous	2005 – 2009
Warped!	4 June 2022 – 28 August 2022
WITS Academy	18 April 2016 - 25 December 2025
You Gotta See This	January 2013 - March 2013
Zoey 101	19 November 2005 - 2010

=== Nick Jr. shows ===
Show	Running period
Abby Hatcher	6 May 2019 - March 2024
The Adventures of Paddington	30 May 2020 – 28 August 2022
Allegra's Window	Unknown
Baby Shark's Big Show!	July 2021 - August 2024
The Backyardigans	2006-2015
Barbapapa: One Big Happy Family!	12 December 2020 - 2022
Barney & Friends	5 April 2004 – 8 August 2012
The Beatbuds, Let's Jam!	9 August 2021 – 26 August 2022
Becca's Bunch	2019
Ben & Holly's Little Kingdom	6 April 2009 - March 2011
Blaze and the Monster Machines	Unknown – 26 August 2022
Blue's Clues	5 November 1998 – 30 June 2011
Blue's Clues & You!	2020 – March 2024
Blue's Room	10 August 2004 – 2 January 2007
Bubble Guppies	2011 – September 2021
Butterbean's Café	11 February 2019 – 30 June 2021
Corn & Peg	24 April 2021 – 26 March 2024
The Day Henry Met	2017 - Unknown
Deer Squad	3 August 2020 – April 2021
Dora and Friends: Into the City!	16 March 2015- 2017
Dora the Explorer	2002 - August 2024
Eureeka's Castle	Unknown
Franklin	5 November 1998 – 30 June 2011
Fresh Beat Band of Spies	25 January 2016 - Unknown
Go, Diego, Go!	2006 - 30 June 2011
Gullah Gullah Island	Unknown: 2001
Hi-5	20 September 2004 - Unknown
Kid-E-Cats	2018 - 2022
LazyTown	17 March 2006 - Unknown
Little Bear	Unknown
Little Bill	Unknown: 2001
The Magic Roundabout	Unknown
Maisy	2005
Max & Ruby	Unknown
Miss Spider's Sunny Patch Friends	2005
Nella the Princess Knight	29 May 2017 - Unknown
Ni Hao, Kai-Lan	14 September 2009 - 2019
Olive The Ostrich	23 July 2012 - Unknown
Oswald	Unknown: 2003
Paw Patrol	2014 - August 2024
Peppa Pig	Unknown
Ready Set Dance	2020 – 28 August 2022
Ricky Zoom	11 November 2020 – 26 August 2022
Rusty Rivets	6 March 2017 - August 2024
Santiago of the Seas	20 February 2021 – 28 August 2022
Shimmer and Shine	30 October 2015 - 2020
Sunny Day	7 May 2018 – 2020
Team Umizoomi	1 March 2010 – 30 June 2011
Thomas & Friends	Unknown
Top Wing	2018 - August 2024
The Upside Down Show	9 August 2006 - Unknown
Wanda and the Alien	Unknown
Wallykazam!	22 January 2018 - August 2024
Wonder Pets!	7 September 2006 – 30 June 2011
Wow! Wow! Wubbzy!	Unknown
Yo Gabba Gabba!	June 2008 - Unknown
Zack & Quack	May 2014 - Unknown
Zoofari	Unknown - 2021

== Programming blocks ==
=== Former programming blocks ===
==== Nick Jr. ====
Nick Jr. was a programming block broadcast on Nickelodeon everyday from 9:30am to 10:40am, airing preschool programs.

==== Hapon Hangout ====
Hapon Hangout was a block that debuted in February 2013 which aired mostly cartoons and live-action. It ended in December 2017.

==== Flick Picks ====
Flick Picks was a programming former block that airs movies.

==== Weekend Express ====
Weekend Express was a programming block that runs every weekends at noon. The block airs programs according to a weekly theme. It ended on 26 June 2011.

==== Lunch Toons ====
Lunch Toons was a limited Nicktoons-based block which airs one random Nicktoon which is repeated when airing various episodes of the show related to food.

==== Nickel Aliens ====
Nickel Aliens was a programming block that debuted in November 2014. It featured shows such as Monsters vs. Aliens, Robot and Monster, Kid vs. Kat, Teenage Mutant Ninja Turtles, Rabbids Invasion, Planet Sheen, Rocket Monkeys and Winx Club.

==== HAHATHON ====
HAHATHON was a programming block that debuted in June 2015. It featured shows such as Winx Club, Oggy and the Cockroaches, Kung Fu Panda: Legends of Awesomeness, SpongeBob SquarePants and Lalaloopsy.

==== WAPAK! Thursdays ====
Wapak Thursdays was a programming block broadcast on Nickelodeon that premieres every Thursday from 6:00 PM to 9:00 PM. It ended on 16 July since LEGO Jurassic World: Legend of Isla Nublar premiered on 20 July which re-run on weekdays at 6:30 PM.

==== TakoTown ====
TakoTown was a programing block that airs Halloween themed episodes and specials of Nickelodeon TV shows every October.

==== Nickelodeon Heroes ====
Nickelodeon Heroes was a programming block on Nickelodeon that premieres every weekdays at 4:30 PM. It airs shows such as SpongeBob SquarePants, The Loud House, Kung Fu Panda: Legends of Awesomeness, ALVINNN! and the Chipmunks and The Fairly OddParents. It ended at 30 August.

==== Listen Out Loud ====
Listen Out Loud was a programming block that airs The Loud House episodes.

==== TeenNick ====
TeenNick was a former block that aired live-action shows.

==== G-Time ====
G-Time was a programming block broadcast on Nickelodeon on weekdays from 4:00pm to 6:00pm. It debuted in November 2018 and ended in January 2019.

==== Animal Carnival ====
Animal Carnival was a programming block on Nickelodeon that debuted in April 2021. It aired on weekdays from 4-6PM. It aired shows like Deer Squad, SpongeBob SquarePants, ALVINNN! and the Chipmunks, It's Pony and 44 Cats.

==== Summer Happiness Lab ====
Summer Happiness Lab was a programming block on Nickelodeon that debuted in July 2021. It aired on weekdays from 4-6PM.

== See also ==
- Nickelodeon (Asia)
- Nickelodeon (Philippines)
