= Teenage Mutant Ninja Turtles: Mutants Unleashed =

- Cover art
- Developer: Aheartfulofgames
- Publisher: Outright Games
- Director: Juan Raigada Fernãndez
- Producers: Marko Ranisavljev; Sam Dale
- Designers: Juan Ramón Espinosa Pedrero; Ángel Mazorra Quinteiro; Rafael De Miguel Gómez; Santiago Rodríguez Bedate; Victor Fernández Pascual
- Programmer: Roberto García Bocos
- Artists: Arantzazu Martínez Ugarte; Arkaitz Pérez Cubas
- Writer: Jeff Sousa
- Series: Teenage Mutant Ninja Turtles
- Platforms: Nintendo Switch; PlayStation 4; PlayStation 5; Windows; Xbox One; Xbox Series X/S
- Release: October 18, 2024
- Genre: Beat 'em up platformer
- Modes: Single-player, multiplayer

Teenage Mutant Ninja Turtles: Mutants Unleashed is a 2024 platform beat 'em up video game developed by Aheartfulofgames and published by Outright Games. The story is set in the universe of the film Teenage Mutant Ninja Turtles: Mutant Mayhem (2023) and takes place shortly after the film's events. It follows the Turtles, who, after being accepted into society and achieving their dreams of attending high school, must deal with a new wave of mutants causing havoc across New York City.

Gameplay is presented from the third-person perspective with a primary focus on the four Turtles — Leonardo, Raphael, Donatello, and Michelangelo — traversal and combat abilities. The game can be played in single player mode or in two player local cooperative multiplayer mode.

Mutants Unleashed was released for the Nintendo Switch, PlayStation 4, PlayStation 5, Xbox One, Xbox Series X/S, and Windows on October 18, 2024. It received mixed reviews from critics who commended the storyline and voice acting, but criticized the combat, prolonged loading time, reused level structures, and technical issues.

== Gameplay ==
Teenage Mutant Ninja Turtles: Mutants Unleashed is a 3D beat 'em up platformer set in a fictionalized New York City. It is presented from a third-person perspective, showing the playable character. The playable characters are the four turtles — Leonardo, Raphael, Donatello, and Michelangelo — who each have their own unique playstyle. In addition to the single-player mode, the game supports two-player local cooperative multiplayer.

== Plot ==
Not long after Leonardo (Nicolas Cantu), Donatello (Micah Abbey), Raphael (Brady Noon), and Michelangelo (Shamon Brown Jr.) defeat Superfly and were accepted into society as heroes and normal teenagers, many mutants dubbed "Mewbies" start to immigrate to New York City, leading to many community centers opening shelters to begin co-existence between the humans and mutants. Suddenly, all the Mewbies start to act aggressively, leading to a citywide curfew and cancelling school. When Bebop and Rocksteady (Max Koch and Fred Tatasciore) start to act aggressively themselves at a concert held by Ray Fillet (Josh Keaton), the Turtles defeat them and discover that they became aggressive due to drinking water, which they believe is contaminated with an unknown pheromone, but only harmful to mutants.

While studying the pheromone with the help of Donatello's new friend Sai Modi (Sunkrish Bala), Genghis Frog (Amad Jackson) becomes infected. At the water treatment plant, the Turtles defeat Genghis and encounter the culprit: a mutant chameleon named Cammy Leon (Amanda Philipson), determined to perpetuate the world's perception of mutants as threats to society. They also discover that Leatherhead (Abby Trott) was also affected by it, via airborne, due to her riding subway trains, resulting in her preparing a doomsday shelter before they defeat her. While attempting to develop a cure, Sai's lab explodes and ends up contaminating Wingnut (Alexa Khan) with a more unstable pheromone, causing her to kidnap Splinter (James Sie), Bebop, Mondo Gecko (Jarred North), and Ray Fillet. After freeing them, Sai resumes researching for a cure, which the Turtles use to cure Wingnut before delivering it out via pizzas.

However, it only makes the Mewbies more volatile, including Michelangelo, due to Cammy managing to contaminate the pheromone further. After defeating Michelangelo, the Turtles confront Cammy, whom they defeat before discovering the Techno Cosmo Research Institute (TCRI) capturing and collaring the Mewbies with mind-controlled headsets, inducing martial law on the city. The Turtles learn that TCRI were the ones that created and released the Mewbies, including Cammy before complying with her request to orchestrate the whole disaster. With the help of their friends, the Turtles expose TCRI's plan by disabling the blimps transmitting the devices before intending to destroy the building producing the pheromone. However, concerned for any Mewbies that wouldn't survive, Cammy enters the building just as it explodes, resulting in her becoming completely feral. She then goes on a rampage before the Turtles defeat her, resulting in her falling from a mass height and into the East River, but her body is not found.

The curfew is soon lifted and the purified Mewbies begin doing community service. The Turtles then admire a new mural, which includes Cammy, whom managed to survive.

=== Fresh Meat DLC ===
While helping Leatherhead search for fashion materials at the junkyard, the turtles discover many Mewbies had taken refuge there, including Scumbug, who had broken up with Splinter when she was exposed to the pheromone herself before eventually defeating and purifying her. Once that was done, she and Splinter reconcile. Everyone then attends Leatherhead's fashion show.

== Development ==
=== Marketing and release ===
Outright games announced the game in September 2023 for unspecified consoles and Windows. In March 2024, the game title was revealed, as was its developer, Aheartfulofgames. Teenage Mutant Ninja Turtles: Mutants Unleashed was released for the Nintendo Switch, PlayStation 4, PlayStation 5, Xbox One, Xbox Series X/S, and Windows on October 18, 2024. It was available in two special editions: the Deluxe Edition, which in addition to the game includes an exclusive steelbook, pin badges, keychains, and an artbook; and the Collector's Edition, which includes everything in the Deluxe Edition as well as a season pass, statue, poster, LED sign, mouse mat, notebook, pen, stickers, and collector's box. In December 2024, a downloadable content (DLC) expansion subtitled Fresh Meat was released and featured a new storyline as well as missions.

== Reception ==
Reception

Aggregate scores
Aggregator	Score
Metacritic	(NS) 61/100 (PS5) 66/100
OpenCritic	22% recommend

Review scores
Publication	Score
Famitsu	25/40
IGN	5/10
Nintendo Life	5/10
Nintendo World Report	6/10

Teenage Mutant Ninja Turtles: Mutants Unleashed received "mixed or average" reviews, according to review aggregator website Metacritic. In Japan, four critics from Famitsu gave the game a total score of 25 out of 40.

Luke Reily of IGN gave the game a 5 out of 10 rating. He commended the visuals and the voice acting, but was ultimately disappointed by the experience for its reused levels, frequent and lengthy loading screens, lack of exploration capabilities, poor camera controls, shallow combat, and slim enemy selection. He wrote: "It's not ninja crap, but the T.U.R.T.L.E. power is limited".

Jim Norman of Nintendo Life also gave the game a 5 out of 10 rating, highlighting the side content, storyline, voice acting, in addition to the length and content as positives. Similar to Reily though, he was overall indifferent to the game for its reused levels, frequent and lengthy loading screens, frame rate drops as well as constant crashes, poor camera controls, and lack of visual flair as compared to Mutant Mayhem.

Neal Ronaghan of Nintendo World Report awarded the game a 6 out of 10 rating. They praised the writing and storyline, fusion of beat 'em up and RPG gameplay, and its ability to capture the essence of the Mutant Mayhem film. Criticism was directed towards the shallow combat, limited multiplayer, and technical issues on the Switch. They wrote: "TMNT Mutants Unleashed has some really good ideas that don't coalesce into a great game".
