= Teenage Mutant Ninja Turtles: Chrome Alone 2 – Lost in New Jersey =

2025 short film directed by Kent Seki

- Title card
- Directed by: Kent Seki
- Written by: Andrew Joustra
- Based on: The Teenage Mutant Ninja Turtles characters created by Peter Laird and Kevin Eastman
- Produced by: Seth Rogen; Evan Goldberg; James Weaver; Jeff Rowe; Ramsay McBean
- Starring: Micah Abbey; Shamon Brown Jr.; Nicolas Cantu; Brady Noon; Beck Bennett; Zach Woods
- Cinematography: Christopher Batty
- Edited by: Myra Owyang
- Music by: Disasterpeace
- Production companies: Paramount Animation; Nickelodeon Movies; Point Grey Pictures
- Distributed by: Paramount Pictures
- Release dates: June 10, 2025 (Annecy); December 19, 2025 (with The SpongeBob Movie: Search for SquarePants)
- Running time: 7 minutes
- Country: United States
- Language: English

Teenage Mutant Ninja Turtles: Chrome Alone 2 – Lost in New Jersey is a 2025 American animated short film directed by Kent Seki and written by Andrew Joustra. Based on the Teenage Mutant Ninja Turtles characters, it is set sometime after the events of the 2023 feature film Mutant Mayhem, and follows the Turtles who journey to New Jersey to confront a mysterious toy company exploiting their newfound fame. It features the voices of Micah Abbey, Shamon Brown Jr., Nicolas Cantu, Brady Noon, Beck Bennett, and Zach Woods.

Chrome Alone 2 – Lost in New Jersey premiered at the Annecy International Animation Film Festival on June 10, 2025, and was released in theaters on December 19, 2025, along with screenings of The SpongeBob Movie: Search for SquarePants. It received positive reviews.

== Plot ==
Leonardo, Donatello, Michelangelo, and Raphael try to find an appropriate Christmas gift for Splinter. While out in New York, they see a commercial for low-quality toys based on them. The turtles find out that they come from a company in Jersey, and reluctantly plan to infiltrate the factory and investigate. Upon breaking in, they find the factory is run by a villain named Chrome Dome, a robot that wants to cash in on ripping off other properties.

The turtles try to fight Chrome Dome, but he beats them by copying all of their fight moves. They realize they need to trick Chrome Dome into mimicking moves that will hurt him. After making him beat himself up, Leo retracts his limbs into his shell, which Chrome Dome copies and causes him to blow himself and the factory up. The boys return home after choosing to get Splinter something more heartfelt. They see that he has already gotten them their gifts, only to see the knock-off toys. The turtles decide to burn them after opening them, and Raph denounces artificial intelligence.

== Voice cast ==
- Micah Abbey as Donatello
- Shamon Brown Jr. as Michelangelo
- Nicolas Cantu as Leonardo
- Brady Noon as Raphael
- Beck Bennett as commercial announcer
- Zach Woods as Chrome Dome

== Production ==
In May 2025, it was reported that two animated short films, Teenage Mutant Ninja Turtles: Chrome Alone 2 – Lost in New Jersey and Order Up, would debut at Paramount Animation and Nickelodeon's presentation at the Annecy International Animation Film Festival in June 2025. Set in the universe of Mutant Mayhem, Chrome Alone 2: Lost in New Jersey was directed by Kent Seki, who served as head of cinematography on the 2023 feature film. The screenplay was written by Andrew Joustra, who served as the script and recording coordinator on the feature. It was produced by Mutant Mayhem director Jeff Rowe alongside Ramsay McBean, and Point Grey Pictures' Seth Rogen, Evan Goldberg, and James Weaver.

As a result of Mutant Mayhem's critical success and lucrative toy line, Paramount greenlit several intermediary projects before the 2027 sequel. Joustra pitched a film treatment for a short film that was put into development after approval from Rowe. Seki was brought in to direct soon after. Seki wanted an unfamiliar location as the backdrop of the film and settled on New Jersey, favoring it for its similarities and differences to New York City. After several rewrites the team settled on the final version of the story, being inspired by the current climate surrounding the rise of artificial intelligence (AI) technology. Mikros Animation returned to provide the CG animation while Wizz once again provided 2D work. The Mikros team had to develop new shaders for metallic surfaces and Chrome Dome. The Grease Pencil in Blender was used to hand-draw in background characters that they could not afford to render in CG. Disasterpeace, the stage name of Richard Vreeland, composed the original music. A single featuring the entire score of the film was released on digital platforms by Paramount Music on January 15, 2026.

== Release ==
Teenage Mutant Ninja Turtles: Chrome Alone 2 – Lost in New Jersey premiered at the Annecy International Animation Film Festival on June 10, 2025, and was released in theaters on December 19, 2025, along with screenings of The SpongeBob Movie: Search for SquarePants. It was made available to Paramount+ in late January 2026 as an extra for Mutant Mayhem.

== Reception ==
Brian VanHooker of Polygon praised the short for its humor and overall anti-AI message. Referencing Disney's deal with OpenAI the week prior, he wrote: "While the message is very 2025, it's in keeping with the spirit of the 1980s origins of the Teenage Mutant Ninja Turtles". In his review for Search for SquarePants, Barry Levitt of The Daily Beast referred to the short as a much needed, enjoyable, and biting satire of AI. Mini Anthikad Chhibber of The Hindu similarly praised the short for its satire, referring to it as a "heavy-duty reality check" before the main film.
