= Jeff Rowe (filmmaker) =

American screenwriter (born 1986)

Jeffrey Rowe
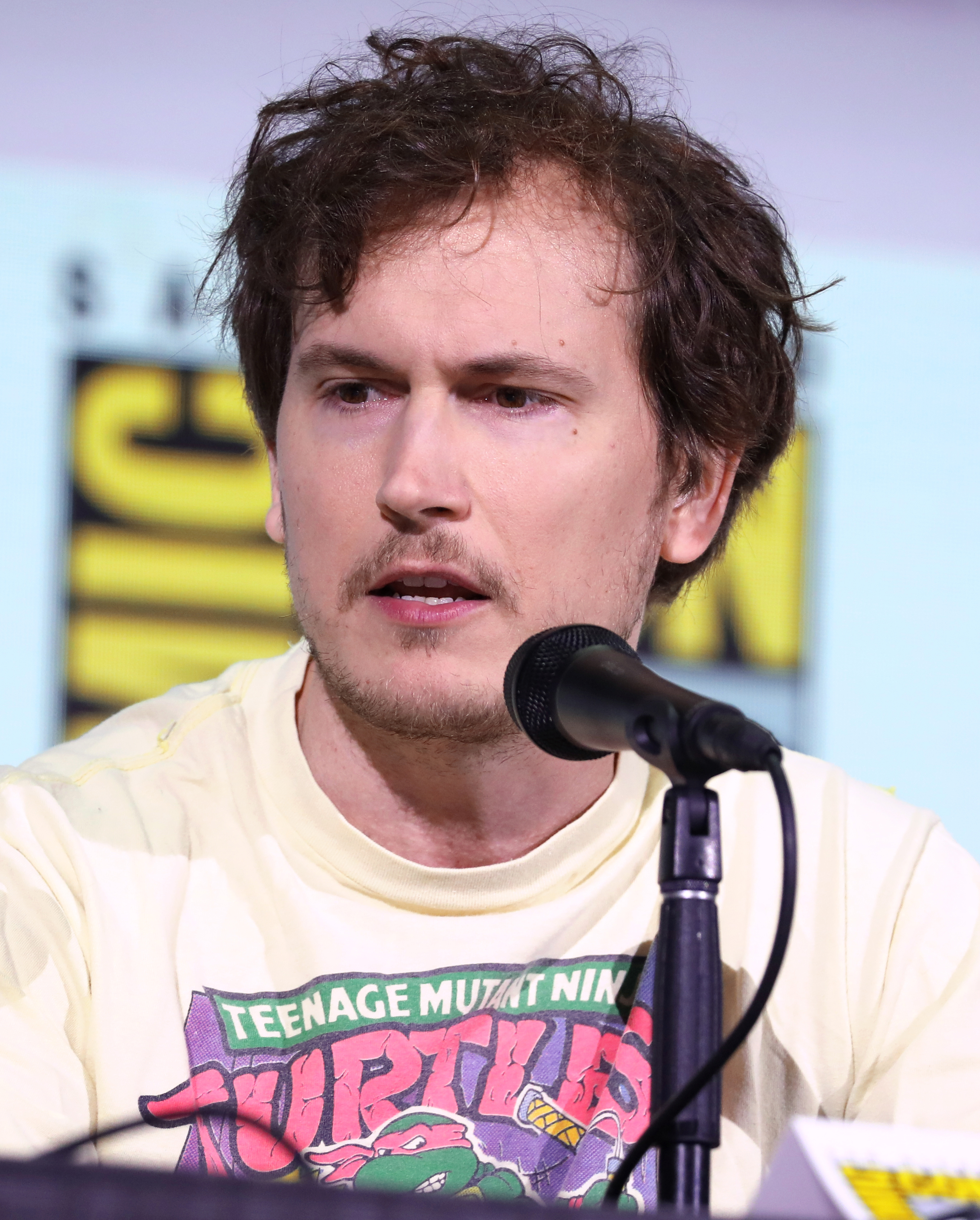
- Rowe in 2023
- Born: July 9, 1986 (age 40); Hometown, Illinois, U.S.
- Education: California Institute of the Arts
- Occupations: Film director; screenwriter
- Notable work: The Mitchells vs. the Machines; Teenage Mutant Ninja Turtles: Mutant Mayhem

Jeffrey Rowe (born July 9, 1986) is an American writer and director. He is known for being a writer for Gravity Falls and Disenchantment, the co-writer and co-director of The Mitchells vs. the Machines, and the director of Teenage Mutant Ninja Turtles: Mutant Mayhem.

== Early life, education and career ==
Rowe grew up in Hometown, Illinois, a suburb of Chicago. He attended the California Institute of the Arts and graduated in 2011.

Rowe briefly worked at Film Roman, Bento Box Entertainment, and Rubicon Group Holding before serving as a writer on the Disney Channel animated series Gravity Falls during its second season. He also wrote for the Netflix animated series, Disenchantment.

Rowe would later go on to co-direct and co-write The Mitchells vs. the Machines along with Mike Rianda. The film was released on Netflix on April 30, 2021. In June 2020, Rowe was hired to direct the film Teenage Mutant Ninja Turtles: Mutant Mayhem, which he also co-wrote. A couple of days before the film's August 2, 2023, release, it was announced that a sequel had been greenlit, with Rowe returning to direct. It is set for release on August 13, 2027. In March 2024, Rowe signed a multi-year first-look deal with Paramount Animation to develop several projects for the studio.

== Filmography ==
=== Film ===
Year	Title	Director	Writer	Producer	Voice	Notes
2021	The Mitchells vs. the Machines	Co-Director	Yes	No	Man Who Loves Fun	
2023	Teenage Mutant Ninja Turtles: Mutant Mayhem	Yes	Yes	No	Man Who Loves Being Young and Free to Go Places	
2025	Teenage Mutant Ninja Turtles: Chrome Alone 2 – Lost in New Jersey	No	No	Yes	—N/a	Short film
2027	Untitled Teenage Mutant Ninja Turtles: Mutant Mayhem sequel	Yes	Yes	No	TBA	

=== Television ===
Writer

Year	Title	Notes
2014–2016	Gravity Falls	9 episodes
2018–2019	Disenchantment	20 episodes

Special thanks

Year	Title	Notes
2022	Amphibia	Episode: "The Hardest Thing"

== Awards and nominations ==
Association	Year	Category	Work	Result	Ref(s)
Annie Awards	2016	Outstanding Achievement in Writing in an Animated TV/Broadcast Production	Gravity Falls	Nominated	
Annie Awards	2017	Outstanding Achievement in Writing in an Animated TV/Broadcast Production	Gravity Falls	Nominated	
Annie Awards	2022	Outstanding Achievement for Directing in an Animated Feature	The Mitchells vs. the Machines	Won	
Annie Awards	2022	Outstanding Achievement in Writing for an Animated Feature	The Mitchells vs. the Machines	Won	
Annie Awards	2024	Outstanding Achievement for Directing in an Animated Feature	Teenage Mutant Ninja Turtles: Mutant Mayhem	Nominated	
Annie Awards	2024	Outstanding Achievement in Writing for an Animated Feature	Teenage Mutant Ninja Turtles: Mutant Mayhem	Nominated	
Hollywood Critics Association Midseason Awards	2022	Best Screenplay	The Mitchells vs. the Machines	Won	
