= Tales of the Teenage Mutant Ninja Turtles (TV series) =

American animated television series

- Genre: Science fiction; Superhero
- Based on: Characters created by: Peter Laird; Kevin Eastman
- Showrunners: Christopher Yost; Alan Wan
- Voices of: Micah Abbey; Shamon Brown Jr.; Nicolas Cantu; Brady Noon; Ayo Edebiri
- Theme music composer: Matt Mahaffey
- Composer: Matt Mahaffey
- Country of origin: United States
- Original language: English
- No. of seasons: 2
- No. of episodes: 24

Production
- Executive producers: Christopher Yost; Alan Wan; Seth Rogen; Evan Goldberg; James Weaver
- Producer: Louis J. Cuck
- Running time: 21–23 minutes
- Production companies: Point Grey Pictures; Nickelodeon Animation Studio

Original release
- Network: Paramount+
- Release: August 9, 2024 – December 12, 2025

Tales of the Teenage Mutant Ninja Turtles is an American animated television series developed for the streaming service Paramount+. Based on the Teenage Mutant Ninja Turtles characters created by Peter Laird and Kevin Eastman, it serves as a spin-off and a bridge between the 2023 film Mutant Mayhem and the sequel. The series follows the Turtles as they navigate their dual lives as both teenagers and heroes in New York City. Christopher Yost and Alan Wan serve as showrunners.

Micah Abbey, Shamon Brown Jr., Nicolas Cantu, Brady Noon, and Ayo Edebiri reprise their voice roles from Mutant Mayhem. During production on the film, its producers Seth Rogen and Evan Goldberg were granted approval to develop a canon streaming television series. The series was announced in July 2023, with Yost and Wan attached as executive producers and showrunners. It is produced by Nickelodeon Animation Studio and Point Grey Pictures, and Titmouse provides animation.

The first season of Tales of the Teenage Mutant Ninja Turtles debuted on Paramount+ on August 9, 2024, with all 12 episodes. It received positive reviews from critics. A second and final season was picked up alongside the first and debuted on December 12, 2025, with the series being officially cancelled a month prior. A tie-in comic book series was launched by IDW Publishing in October 2025 and continues past the show's end.

== Premise ==
Picking up two months after the events of the film Teenage Mutant Ninja Turtles: Mutant Mayhem (2023), the series follows the aftermath of Superfly’s defeat, and the Turtles as they navigate their dual lives as both teenagers and heroes in New York City and before the events of the film sequel.

Though the series was marketed as "canon," each of its story arcs is built around an unreliable narrator framing device that implies, or states outright, they are made-up "tales" invented by one of the four Turtles.

== Cast and characters ==
- Micah Abbey as Donatello: The tech guru of the Turtles who uses a bō staff in combat. He has a liking for anime and video games.
- Shamon Brown Jr. as Michelangelo: The fun-loving jokester of Turtles who uses nunchucks. He desires to be a stand-up comedian.
- Nicolas Cantu as Leonardo: The leader of the Turtles who uses two katana. He has a romantic interest in April O'Neil.
- Brady Noon as Raphael: The muscle of the Turtles who uses a pair of sai. He has a "fight first, ask questions later" attitude.
- Ayo Edebiri as April O'Neil: A high school news reporter and human friend of the Turtles.
- Splinter is a mutant rat and the adoptive father and mentor of the Turtles. He was previously voiced by Jackie Chan in Mutant Mayhem, but only speaks in a gibberish language called "vermin" in Tales. Fred Tatasciore provides the voice and is credited as "Splinter Vermin".

== Episodes ==
Season	Episodes	Originally released
1	12	August 9, 2024
2	12	December 12, 2025

=== Season 1 (2024) ===
No. overall	No. in season	Title	Directed by	Written by	Storyboarded by	Original release date
1	1	"Leo Nardo Stands Alone!"	Kalvin Lee^{st} Colin Heck^{su}	Christopher Yost	Eleisiya Arocha, Gabriela Camarillo, Ian Higginbotham and Kenji Ono	August 9, 2024
2	2	"Mikey Does the Right Thing"	Kenji Ono^{st} Colin Heck^{su}	Matthew Bass	Sebrina Gao, Jerry Gaylord and Laura Gille	August 9, 2024
3	3	"Raph Thinks It Through"	Jennifer Bennett^{st} Colin Heck^{su}	Christopher Yost	Peter Foltz, Ian Higginbotham, Kam Kalambay, Lyndsay Simpson and Jaxon Sorby	August 9, 2024
4	4	"Donnie Hangs Tough"	Kalvin Lee^{st} Colin Heck^{su}	Alex Hanson	Eleisiya Arocha, Gabriela Camarillo, Lyndsay Simpson and Tim Yan	August 9, 2024
5	5	"Bishop Makes Her Move!"	Jennifer Bennett^{st} Colin Heck^{su}	Haley Mancini	Ian Higginbotham, Jaxon Sorby and Jasmine Suggs	August 9, 2024
6	6	"Night of the Mechazoids"	Kenji Ono^{st} Colin Heck^{su}	Kevin Shinick	Sebrina Gao, Jerry Gaylord and Laura Gille	August 9, 2024
7	7	"Raph vs. Water"	Kalvin Lee^{st} Colin Heck^{su}	Matthew Bass	Phil Allora, Lyndsay Simpson and Tim Yan	August 9, 2024
8	8	"Mikey Takes Charge"	Jennifer Bennett^{st} Colin Heck^{su}	Alex Hanson	Ian Higginbotham, Jasmine Goggins and Jaxon Sorby	August 9, 2024
9	9	"Splinter and April Fight a Goldfish"	Kenji Ono^{st} Colin Heck^{su}	Haley Mancini	Sebrina Gao, Jerry Gaylord and Laura Gille	August 9, 2024
10	10	"Donnie Goes Deep"	Kenji Ono^{st} Colin Heck^{su}	Matthew Bass	Phil Allora, Lyndsay Simpson and Tim Yan	August 9, 2024
11	11	"Leonardo Saddles Up"	Jennifer Bennett^{st} Colin Heck^{su}	Elise Roncace	Ian Higginbotham, Jerry Gaylord, Jasmine Goggins and Jaxon Sorby	August 9, 2024
12	12	"The Pearl"	Alan Wan^{st} Colin Heck^{su}	Alex Hanson	Sebrina Gao, Laura Gille, Chris Luc and Kevin Molina-Ortiz	August 9, 2024

=== Season 2 (2025) ===
No. overall	No. in season	Title	Directed by	Written by	Storyboarded by	Original release date
13	1	"Mutant Battle Arena"	Kevin Molina-Ortiz^{st} ^{su}	Christopher Yost	Richard Chi, Chris Luc, and Lyndsay Simpson	December 12, 2025
14	2	"Mutantweight Title Bout"	Laura Gille^{st} Kevin Molina-Ortiz^{su}	Matthew Bass	Sebrina Gao, William Shen, and Tim Yan	December 12, 2025
15	3	"Raph Fights Everyone"	Rie Koga^{st} Kevin Molina-Ortiz^{su}	Ellie Guzman	Kyra Pescador, Andy Pineda, and Ed Raza	December 12, 2025
16	4	"The Island"	JJ Conway^{st} Kevin Molina-Ortiz^{su}	Kevin Burke and Chris "Doc" Wyatt	Richard Chi, Matthew Kim, and Lyndsay Simpson	December 12, 2025
17	5	"The Other Mutanimals"	Laura Gille^{st} Kevin Molina-Ortiz^{su}	Felicia Ho	Sebrina Gao, William Shen, and Tim Yan	December 12, 2025
18	6	"The Rejects"	Rie Koga^{st} Kevin Molina-Ortiz^{su}	Matthew Bass	Kyra Pescador, Andy Pineda, and Ed Raza	December 12, 2025
19	7	"Rise of the Night Ninja"	JJ Conway^{st} Kevin Molina-Ortiz^{su}	Ellie Guzman	Richard Chi, Matthew Kim, and Lyndsay Simpson	December 12, 2025
20	8	"The Night Ninja Returns"	Laura Gille^{st} Kevin Molina-Ortiz^{su}	Rebecca Hoobler	Sebrina Gao, William Shen, and Tim Yan	December 12, 2025
21	9	"The Itching Scratch"	Rie Koga^{st} Kevin Molina-Ortiz^{su}	Aliza & Talia Berger	Kyra Pescador, Andy Pineda, and Ed Raza	December 12, 2025
22	10	"Get Rod"	JJ Conway^{st} Kevin Molina-Ortiz^{su}	Mikey Levitt	Richard Chi, Matthew Kim, and Lyndsay Simpson	December 12, 2025
23	11	"The Unusual Suspects"	Laura Gille^{st} Kevin Molina-Ortiz^{su}	Ellie Guzman	Sebrina Gao, William Shen, and Tim Yan	December 12, 2025
24	12	"The Big Muck"	Rie Koga^{st} Kevin Molina-Ortiz^{su}	Matthew Bass	Kyra Pescador, Andy Pineda, and Ed Raza	December 12, 2025

- ^st Storyboard director
- ^su Supervising director

== Production ==
=== Development ===
According to Christopher Yost, during the middle of production on Teenage Mutant Ninja Turtles: Mutant Mayhem (2023), producers Seth Rogen and Evan Goldberg were granted approval to develop a canon streaming television series. Yost was then approached to see if he would be interested in meeting Rogen, and after agreeing, the two discussed what the series could be. Alan Wan was brought in to work with Yost. Between the two, they had experience working on the 2003 Turtles series, the 2012 Turtles series, and the 2018 series Rise of the Teenage Mutant Ninja Turtles.

In July 2023, Variety reported that a film sequel and a 2D animated television series follow-up for Mutant Mayhem had been greenlit. The series, titled Tales of the Teenage Mutant Ninja Turtles, was reported to act as a bridge between Mutant Mayhem and the film sequel, which has been scheduled to release in theaters in 2026. Yost and Wan were announced as executive producers and showrunners. Lukas Williams was set to oversee production for Point Grey Pictures which co-produces with Nickelodeon Animation Studio. Production for Nickelodeon was overseen by Claudia Spinelli, Senior Vice President of Nickelodeon Animation, and Nikki Price, Director of Development and Executive in Charge of Production.

Despite reportedly being greenlit for two seasons on announcement, Yost later said in an August 2024 interview that he was unsure if there would be a second season but said they had plenty of ideas for one. In the January 2025 issue Toy World Magazine, Paramount confirmed that a second season will debut later that year on Paramount+ and Nickelodeon. In November 2025, it was announced the series was cancelled alongside Dora stemming from management shifts caused by the Paramount-Skydance merger, and the second season would be its final season.

=== Casting, voice recording and music ===
Along with the series' announcement in July 2023, Micah Abbey, Shamon Brown Jr., Nicolas Cantu, and Brady Noon were confirmed to reprise their voice roles from Mutant Mayhem as the four Turtles. Ayo Edebiri was later confirmed to reprise her role as April O'Neil in February 2024. Unlike with Mutant Mayhem, in which Abbey, Brown, Cantu, and Noon recorded their voice roles together, for Tales, they recorded independently from one another. The actors felt that the decision affected the way they performed and helped them dig deeper into their respective characters. Splinter, who was previously voiced by Jackie Chan in Mutant Mayhem, only speaks in a gibberish language called "vermin" in Tales. Fred Tatasciore provides the voice and is credited as "Splinter Vermin". The series' opening theme and score was composed by Matt Mahaffey, who previously composed the score for Rise of the Teenage Mutant Ninja Turtles and its 2022 film continuation.

=== Writing and animation ===
Unlike previous Turtles series, which were developed as television shows first, Tales is a continuation of a film. This meant the showrunners had to use Mutant Mayhem as a guiding map in development. Just like with the film, the showrunners emphasized the teenage aspect of the Turtles. The series is presented from the Turtles point of view. Yost said that they sometimes think of it as "Tales by the Teenage Mutant Ninja Turtles", adding that there was a bit of an unreliable narrator element to it. The showrunners described the world presented in the series as being more grounded than those of previous incarnations of Turtles. The team made efforts to integrate April O'Neil into the stories and make sure she did not feel too distant from the Turtles.

Independent animation studio Titmouse's Canadian unit provides the animation for the series. Like with Mutant Mayhem, which took an unconventional approach to its CG animation, Wan wanted the series to take an unconventional 2D animation look. He wanted to capture a "punk rock" feeling and described the style as rough and raw. The showrunner felt the series' more crude art style helped to distinguish it from its more clean-looking action cartoon peers. Wan also felt that the art style paid homage to the original Turtles comics by Kevin Eastman and Peter Laird. The series uses comic book drawings by Leonardo as a framing device, which the showrunners also added as an homage to the comics. For the action sequences, the team drew inspiration from various iterations of Turtles, including Mutant Mayhem, the 1990s live-action films, and Rise of the Teenage Mutant Ninja Turtles.

== Release and reception ==
The first season of Tales of the Teenage Mutant Ninja Turtles debuted on Paramount+ on August 9, 2024, with all of its ordered 12 episodes. The season was released on DVD and Blu-ray on November 12, 2024, by Paramount Home Entertainment. The second season debuted on Paramount+ on December 12, 2025.

=== Critical response ===
For the first season, Rotten Tomatoes reported 100% approval with an average rating of 8.0/10 based on 9 reviews. Overall, the season received positive reviews from critics for its voice performances, animation, and action sequences. Some critics felt that it lived up to standard set up by Mutant Mayhem, while various others opined that it was a downgrade.

=== Accolades ===
Date of ceremony	Award	Category	Recipient(s)	Result	Ref.
2024	Hollywood Professional Association Awards	HPA Award for Outstanding Color Grading – Animated Episode or Non-Theatrical Feature	Ara Thomassian (Keep Me Posted) (for "Night of the Mechazoids")	Nominated	
2025	Annie Awards	Outstanding Achievement for Character Design in an Animated Television / Broadcast Production	Rustam Hasanov (for "Night of the Mechazoids")	Nominated	
2025	Annie Awards	Outstanding Achievement for Directing in an Animated Television / Broadcast Production	Alan Wan, Colin Heck (for "The Pearl")	Nominated	
2025	Annie Awards	Outstanding Achievement for Storyboarding in an Animated Television / Broadcast Production	Laura Gille, Sebrina Gao, Kevin Molina-Ortiz (for "The Pearl")	Nominated	
2025	Annie Awards	Outstanding Achievement for Voice Acting in an Animated Television / Broadcast Production	Ayo Edebiri (for "Splinter and April Fight a Goldfish")	Nominated	
2025	Annie Awards	Outstanding Achievement for Editorial in an Animated Television / Broadcast Production	Caleb Yoder (for "The Pearl")	Nominated	
2026	Annie Awards	Best TV/Media – Children	Tales of the Teenage Mutant Ninja Turtles (for "Rise of the Night Ninja")	Nominated	
2026	Annie Awards	Outstanding Achievement for Directing in an Animated Television / Broadcast Production	JJ Conway and Kevin Molina-Ortiz (for "Rise of the Night Ninja")	Nominated	
2026	Annie Awards	Outstanding Achievement for Storyboarding in an Animated Television / Broadcast Production	Richard Chi, Matthew Kim, Sheldon Vella, Lyndsay Simpson (for "Rise of the Night Ninja")	Nominated	
2026	Children's & Family Emmy Awards	Outstanding Individual Achievement in Animation – Color	Mark Anthony Mohamed	Won	

== Comic book series ==
In June 2025, it was announced that a six-issue comic book series based on the television show would be launched by IDW Publishing in October of that same year. The first story arc in the run was written by Mikey Levitt, a creative from the television series, while the second was written by Andrew Joustra, the script and recording coordinator of Mutant Mayhem and writer of the short film, Chrome Alone 2 – Lost in New Jersey (2025). Louie Joyce provided artwork for the full run.

In January 2026, it was reported that the comic would continue past the initial six-issue run despite the television show's cancellation and conclusion in late 2025. A limited series, titled Coastal Chaos, was released on September 9th, 2026, with Joustra writing and Joyce providing the artwork.
