= Shamon Brown Jr. =

American actor

- Born: July 17, 2004 (age 22)
- Occupation: Actor
- Years active: 2010–present

Shamon Brown Jr. is an American actor. He is best known for playing Stanley Jackson in The Chi and voicing Michelangelo in Teenage Mutant Ninja Turtles: Mutant Mayhem.

== Early life ==
In 2010, he started appearing in local theatrical productions by independent Chicago playwrights.

== Career ==
Brown's first big role came playing Stanley "Papa" Jackson in the Showtime series The Chi. After starting off as a recurring character in season 1, he was upgraded to a main character for season 2. His biggest role so far has been voicing Michelangelo in the superhero film Teenage Mutant Ninja Turtles: Mutant Mayhem. He reprised the role in Tales of the Teenage Mutant Ninja Turtles.

== Personal life ==
He cites Cory Hardrict as his role model and the best African-American actor. Other influences are Tia Mowry, Tyler Perry, and Zendaya. He has loved Zendaya since he was a child watching her shows on Disney Channel.

== Filmography ==
=== Film ===
Year	Title	Role	Notes
2023	Teenage Mutant Ninja Turtles: Mutant Mayhem	Michelangelo	Voice
2024	Peppermint Spiral	Angel	Short; voice
2025	Teenage Mutant Ninja Turtles: Chrome Alone 2 – Lost in New Jersey	Michelangelo	Short; voice
2027	Untitled Teenage Mutant Ninja Turtles: Mutant Mayhem sequel	Michelangelo	Voice

=== Television ===
Year	Title	Role	Notes
2018–26	The Chi	Stanley Jackson	84 episodes
2024–25	Tales of the Teenage Mutant Ninja Turtles	Mikey	23 episodes

=== Video Games ===
Year	Title	Voice role
2024	Teenage Mutant Ninja Turtles: Mutants Unleashed	Mikey
