= Untitled Teenage Mutant Ninja Turtles: Mutant Mayhem sequel =

Upcoming film directed by Jeff Rowe

- Directed by: Jeff Rowe
- Based on: Teenage Mutant Ninja Turtles characters by: Peter Laird; Kevin Eastman
- Produced by: Seth Rogen; Evan Goldberg; James Weaver; Josh Fagen; Ramsay McBean
- Starring: Micah Abbey; Shamon Brown Jr.; Nicolas Cantu; Brady Noon
- Cinematography: Kent Seki
- Production companies: Paramount Animation; Nickelodeon Movies; Point Grey Pictures
- Distributed by: Paramount Pictures
- Release date: August 13, 2027
- Country: United States
- Language: English

The untitled Teenage Mutant Ninja Turtles: Mutant Mayhem sequel is an upcoming American animated superhero film directed by Jeff Rowe. Based on the Teenage Mutant Ninja Turtles characters, it is the sequel to Mutant Mayhem (2023) and features the returning voices of Micah Abbey, Shamon Brown Jr., Nicolas Cantu, and Brady Noon as the Turtles. In the film, the Turtles face off against a new and deadly foe: the Shredder.

A sequel to Mutant Mayhem was announced in July 2023, before the film's release. Rowe was confirmed to return as director, with Point Grey Pictures' Seth Rogen, Evan Goldberg, James Weaver, and Josh Fagen returning as producers alongside Ramsay McBean. Rowe sought for the sequel to be "a villain-forward film", putting focus on both the Turtles and the Shredder. Mikros Animation returns to provide animation.

The film is scheduled to be released by Paramount Pictures in the United States on August 13, 2027.

== Premise ==
The Turtles face off against a new and deadly foe: the Shredder.

== Voice cast ==
- Micah Abbey as Donatello: The tech guru of the Turtles who uses a bō staff in combat. He has a liking for anime and video games.
- Shamon Brown Jr. as Michelangelo: The fun-loving jokester of Turtles who uses nunchucks. He desires to be a stand-up comedian.
- Nicolas Cantu as Leonardo: The leader of the Turtles who uses two katana. He has a romantic interest in April O'Neil.
- Brady Noon as Raphael: The muscle of the Turtles who uses a pair of sai. He has a "fight first, ask questions later" attitude.

== Production ==
=== Development ===
In June 2022, Brian Robbins, then-CEO of Paramount Pictures, said that there were plans for multiple feature film follow-ups to the then-upcoming Teenage Mutant Ninja Turtles: Mutant Mayhem (2023). In a July 2023 interview, director Jeff Rowe expressed interest in returning for a sequel featuring the Shredder. Later that month, Variety reported that a sequel film and an animated television series for Paramount+, Tales of the Teenage Mutant Ninja Turtles, had been greenlit. Rowe was set to return as director. Point Grey Pictures' Seth Rogen, Evan Goldberg, James Weaver, and Josh Fagen returned as producers alongside Ramsay McBean, who served as an executive producer on Mutant Mayhem.

In April 2024, it was reported that Kyler Spears and Yashar Kassai, who served as co-director and production designer on Mutant Mayhem, respectively, would be joining Rowe on the sequel as co-directors. In a July 2024 interview, Rogen said that the film had been titled and an animatic had been completed. In December 2024, Mikros Animation, which provided animation on Mutant Mayhem, announced that they would be returning to lead animation for the sequel. In February 2025, it was reported that Mikros' parent company, Technicolor Group, would shut down its operations immediately due to financial struggles and failures to find new investors. This led to Mikros' global operations ceasing work on current projects, including the Mutant Mayhem sequel. In March 2025, it was reported that Rodeo FX acquired Mikros' Paris and Canadian operations and would resume work on paused projects. During the Paramount presentation at CinemaCon 2026, Rogen announced that the film would feature the presence of Krang as an additional antagonist.

=== Writing and animation ===
Writing for the film had already begun by 2023. Shredder was originally the main villain of Mutant Mayhem, but was written out because Rowe wanted the film's villain to be a mutant who the Turtles could relate to and be tempted by. The director sought for the sequel to be "a villain-forward film" while also keeping the focus on the Turtles. In addition, he wanted the film's depiction of the Shredder to be unique but still faithful to the original character, and establish him as a more intimidating presence than Mutant Mayhem's villain, Superfly. In addition to Mikros returning to provide animation, Kent Seki once again assumed the role of head of cinematography.

=== Casting and voice recording ===
Micah Abbey, Shamon Brown Jr., Nicolas Cantu, and Brady Noon are set to reprise their voice roles as the Turtles: Donatello, Michelangelo, Leonardo, and Raphael. Voice recording had already begun by 2025.

== Release ==
The film is scheduled to be theatrically released by Paramount Pictures in the United States on August 13, 2027. It was previously scheduled to release on October 9, 2026, and September 17, 2027. According to Animation Magazine, "unspecified delays in physical animation production" led to the first release date push.

=== Marketing ===
In December 2025, it was reported that Paramount would not renew its agreement with Playmates Toys, ending the company's nearly 40-year long tenure as the manufacturer of Turtles toys. In February 2026, it was announced that Mattel had acquired the franchise's master license, and their partnership would begin with toys based off the Mutant Mayhem sequel in 2027.

== Future ==
By December 2025, Rogen and Point Grey Pictures were in discussions with Paramount Skydance to produce a third film in the series.
