= Brady Noon =

American actor (born 2005)

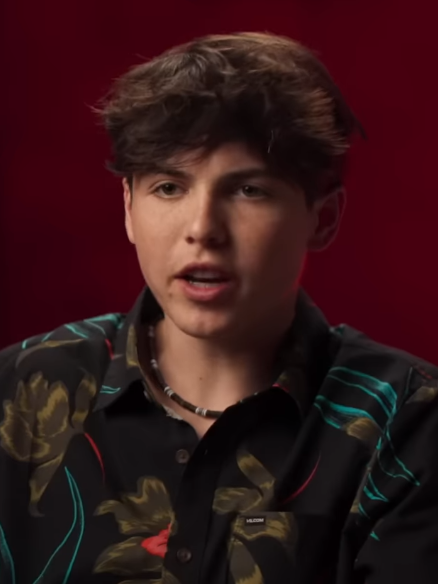
- Noon in 2023
- Born: December 30, 2005 (age 20); Forked River, New Jersey, U.S.
- Occupation: Actor
- Years active: 2010–present
- Awards: Full list

Brady Noon (born December 30, 2005) is an American actor. He gained recognition as a child actor with his portrayal of Thomas Darmody in the HBO period crime drama series Boardwalk Empire (2010–2013), earning the Actor Award for Outstanding Performance by an Ensemble in a Drama Series and a nomination at the Young Artist Awards.

Noon's career progressed with his leading role alongside Jacob Tremblay in the coming of age comedy Good Boys (2019) and voice acting as Greg Heffley in the first three Diary of a Wimpy Kid animated reboot films (2021–2023) and Raphael in the Teenage Mutant Ninja Turtles franchise animations and other media (2023–present). He also acted alongside Jennifer Garner in the Netflix fantasy comedy Family Switch (2023) and in the Disney+ animated television series The Mighty Ducks: Game Changers (2021–2022). For his voice acting, he earned two consecutive Kids' Choice Awards nominations.

== Career ==
Noon was raised in the Forked River section of Lacey Township, New Jersey.

In 2010, Noon began his career on the television show Boardwalk Empire, portraying Thomas Darmody, which he followed up with playing Thor in the 2019 comedy film Good Boys. In 2021, he played Evan Morrow in the Disney+ series The Mighty Ducks: Game Changers, while in the same year voicing Greg Heffley in the animated Disney+ film Diary of a Wimpy Kid. In September 2021, he was cast as Lucas Hollister for the 2024 western film Rust, but by April 2023 he was replaced by Patrick Scott McDermott, when Noon was unavailable because of other commitments when the production was delayed for over a year caused by the film's shooting incident.

In 2022, he reprised his voice role of Greg Heffley in Diary of a Wimpy Kid: Rodrick Rules, followed by an appearance in the comedy film Marry Me as George. In 2023, he starred in the Netflix comedy film Family Switch as Wyatt, prior to voicing Raphael in the film Teenage Mutant Ninja Turtles: Mutant Mayhem and the television series Tales of the Teenage Mutant Ninja Turtles. In August 2024, he was cast as Steven in Mother and Me.

== Filmography ==
=== Film ===
Year	Title	Role	Notes and Ref.
2019	Good Boys	Thor	
2021	Diary of a Wimpy Kid	Greg Heffley (voice)	
2022	Marry Me	George	
2022	Diary of a Wimpy Kid: Rodrick Rules	Greg Heffley (voice)	
2023	Teenage Mutant Ninja Turtles: Mutant Mayhem	Raphael (voice)	
2023	Family Switch	Wyatt Walker	
2025	Teenage Mutant Ninja Turtles: Chrome Alone 2 – Lost in New Jersey	Raphael (voice)	Short film
2027	Untitled Teenage Mutant Ninja Turtles: Mutant Mayhem sequel	Raphael (voice)	
TBA	Mother and Me	Steven	

=== Television ===
Year	Title	Role	Notes and Ref.
2010–13	Boardwalk Empire	Thomas Darmody	Recurring role (seasons 1–4)
2021–22	The Mighty Ducks: Game Changers	Evan Morrow	Main role
2024–25	Tales of the Teenage Mutant Ninja Turtles	Raph (voice)	Main role

=== Video Game ===
Year	Title	Voice role	Notes and Ref.
2024	Teenage Mutant Ninja Turtles: Mutants Unleashed	Raph	

== Accolades ==
Award	Year	Category	Nominee / work	Result	Ref.
2012	18th Screen Actors Guild Awards (now Actor Awards)	Outstanding Performance by an Ensemble in a Drama Series	Boardwalk Empire	Won	
2012	33rd Young Artist Awards	Best Performance in a TV Series	Boardwalk Empire	Nominated	
2023	2023 Kids' Choice Awards	Favorite Male TV Star	The Mighty Ducks: Game Changers	Nominated	
2024	2024 Kids' Choice Awards	Favorite Male Voice from an Animated Movie	Teenage Mutant Ninja Turtles: Mutant Mayhem	Nominated	
