= Micah Abbey =

American actor

- Born: Micah Joseph Nii Sekoh Kpakpo Abbey; November 8, 2007 (age 18); Columbus, Ohio
- Occupation: Actor
- Years active: 2017–present

Micah Joseph Nii Sekoh Kpakpo Abbey (born November 8, 2007), better known simply as Micah Abbey, is an American actor. He is best known for playing Leaf in Cousins for Life and voicing Donatello in Teenage Mutant Ninja Turtles: Mutant Mayhem.

== Early life ==
Abbey was born in Columbus, Ohio to a Ghanaian father and a mother of Italian and Eastern European descent. He moved to Los Angeles at the age of ten.

== Career ==
Abbey made his acting debut in the medical drama series Grey's Anatomy. His first big role came playing Leaf in the Nickelodeon series Cousins for Life. His biggest role so far has been voicing Donatello in the superhero film Teenage Mutant Ninja Turtles: Mutant Mayhem. He reprised the role in Tales of the Teenage Mutant Ninja Turtles.

== Personal life ==
Abbey enjoys surfing and snowboarding in California. Back in his home state of Ohio he enjoyed Borgatas Pizza located in Worthington, supporting the Ohio State Buckeyes football and the winter season.

== Filmography ==
=== Film ===
| Year | Title | Role | Notes |
|---|---|---|---|
| 2023 | Teenage Mutant Ninja Turtles: Mutant Mayhem | Donatello | Voice |
| 2025 | Teenage Mutant Ninja Turtles: Chrome Alone 2 – Lost in New Jersey | Donatello | Voice; Short film |
| 2027 | Untitled Teenage Mutant Ninja Turtles: Mutant Mayhem sequel | Donatello | Voice |

=== Television ===
| Year | Title | Role | Notes |
|---|---|---|---|
| 2017–18 | Grey's Anatomy | Frankie Baner | 2 episodes |
| 2018–19 | Cousins for Life | Leaf | 20 episodes |
| 2020 | Action Nat and the Cat | Liam | Episode; The Field Trip |
| 2021 | Bunk'd | Zachary | Episode; Gi Whiz |
| 2022 | Meet the Voxels | Codey Voxel | Episode; Pilot |
| 2023 | The Manny | Santiago | 26 Episodes (English Dub; Netflix) |
| 2024–25 | Tales of the Teenage Mutant Ninja Turtles | Donnie | All 24 episodes |
| 2025 | Pupstruction | Brett | Episode; The Petsburg Kite Festival/Muddy Buddies |

=== Video Games ===
| Year | Title | Voice role |
|---|---|---|
| 2024 | Teenage Mutant Ninja Turtles: Mutants Unleashed | Donnie |
