= Nicolas Cantu =

American actor (born 2003)

- Cantu in 2024
- Born: September 8, 2003 (age 23); Mexico City, Mexico
- Other name: Junky Janker (Note: Stylized in all lowercase. Cantu retired this alias in September 2023.) TheCAN2Network (Note: The channel was originally entitled "nicolasCAN2" when it was first launched in September 2023 before its title was updated to "TheCAN2Network" in January 2024.)
- Citizenship: United States; Mexico
- Occupations: Actor; YouTuber; animator
- Years active: 2014–present

YouTube information
- Channel: JunkyJanker
- Subscribers: 406 thousand
- Views: 8 million
- Last updated: 14 July 2026

Nicolas Cantu (born September 8, 2003), also known by his internet pseudonyms Junky Janker and TheCAN2Network, is a Mexican-born American actor and former YouTuber and animator.

Cantu is best known for being the third voice of Gumball Watterson in the Cartoon Network animated television series The Amazing World of Gumball (2017–2019) and the voice of Leonardo in the animated film Teenage Mutant Ninja Turtles: Mutant Mayhem (2023) and its Nickelodeon television adaptation Tales of the Teenage Mutant Ninja Turtles (2024). His other notable voice roles include Rowan Freemaker on the Disney XD computer-animated TV series Lego Star Wars: The Freemaker Adventures (2016–2017), the third voice of Prince James on the Disney Junior animated TV series Sofia the First (2016–2018), and Dak on the Netflix computer-animated series DreamWorks Dragons: Rescue Riders (2019–2020). Cantu is also known for his live-action roles, starring as Elton Ortiz in the AMC television series The Walking Dead: World Beyond (2020–2021), as Hark in the film The Fabelmans (2022), and as Marcel in the Amazon Prime Video television series Motorheads (2025).

His YouTube channel has over 411,000 subscribers.

== Early life ==
Nicolas Cantu was born on September 8, 2003, in Mexico City, Mexico. (Note: Cantu stated; “Yeah. Both of my parents are from Mexico City. I was born there so I have a lot of Spanish influence in my life.”) He is of Mexican descent; both of his parents are from Mexico City. His father is a lawyer and his mother is a social worker. Cantu is the second of three sons. He grew up in San Antonio, Texas and attended Stone Oak Elementary School. He moved to Los Angeles, California when he was 10 years old to pursue his acting career. Cantu eventually moved back to San Antonio in 2022.

== Career ==
=== Commercials ===
Cantu began his career starring in several TV commercials, including for Chuck E. Cheese's, AT&T, and Old Navy, as well as one for the San Antonio Spurs.

=== Television ===
He began his acting career at the age of twelve with a voice role as Diego Márquez in a 2016 episode of the Nickelodeon series Dora and Friends: Into the City!. He then began voice acting in main roles in the same year. His first main voice role was as Rowan Freemaker in the Disney XD television series Lego Star Wars: The Freemaker Adventures. He also starred as Paco on the TV animated show Future-Worm!, voiced Prince James for the Disney Junior show Sofia the First, replacing Tyler Merna, and provided additional voices for the Cartoon Network reboot series The Powerpuff Girls. From 2017 to 2019, he voiced the title character on the Cartoon Network series The Amazing World of Gumball, replacing Jacob Hopkins during the fifth season. In The Gumball Chronicles, an eight-episode miniseries based on the show, which premiered on the said network in 2020, he was replaced by Duke Cutler due to puberty. He then made his live-action debut in the former's year with a guest role in an episode of Teachers as Quinn and played Travis on an episode of Disney Channel's Raven's Home. In 2018, Cantu appeared as Raymond on The Good Place. In 2019, he made one-episode appearances on the TV series Bizaardvark, Sydney to the Max and DuckTales. He voiced Winston on Middle School Moguls and appeared as Andrew on the CBS sitcom The Unicorn. He also voiced Dak on the Netflix series DreamWorks Dragons: Rescue Riders. In 2020, he voiced Rhys on an episode of Where's Waldo?, played Elton Ortiz on AMC's The Walking Dead: World Beyond and provided the voice of Teia on the animated series Puppy Dog Pals. In 2021, he played Dennis Kern on an episode of The Rookie, appeared as JJ on two episodes of 9-1-1: Lone Star and voiced Ensign Mainstay on the Netflix series Kid Cosmic. In 2022, he voiced Smooth Jason and Wrinkly on the Netflix show Oddballs. His most recent 2023 roles include Barry in the Disney+ series American Born Chinese, Otto in the Disney Channel animated TV series Hailey's On It! and Charlie in the Netflix animated TV series Skull Island. In 2024, he guest voiced Dante in Star Wars: Tales of the Empire and Rubin in Dream Productions, both of which were released and streamed on Disney+, as well as voicing Leonardo in the Nickelodeon animated television series Tales of the Teenage Mutant Ninja Turtles, reprising his role from Teenage Mutant Ninja Turtles: Mutant Mayhem. In 2025, he voiced Tommy in Adult Swim's Common Side Effects, and returned to live-action by portraying Marcel Crawford on Amazon Prime Video's Motorheads.

=== Film ===
Cantu began his film career at the age of fourteen with a voice role as Curly on the 2017 Nickelodeon TV film Hey Arnold!: The Jungle Movie. He then starred in Steven Spielberg's The Fabelmans as Hark in 2022. He auditioned for the lead role of Sammy Fabelman, but was given the role of Hark after being rejected for the role of Sammy. He provided the voice of Leonardo on the 2023 film Teenage Mutant Ninja Turtles: Mutant Mayhem. Later in 2025, Cantu reprises his role as Leonardo in the short film Teenage Mutant Ninja Turtles: Chrome Alone 2 – Lost in New Jersey.

== Personal life ==
Cantu is a gamer. On November 8, 2018, he hosted a fundraiser for the Children's Hospital Los Angeles at Bob's Big Boy in Burbank, California.

Cantu identifies as pansexual.

== Filmography ==
=== Film ===
Year	Title	Role	Notes	Ref
2017	Hey Arnold!: The Jungle Movie	Curly (voice)	Television film	
2017	The Impossible Joy	Tomas	Short film	
2017	Vikes	Joey		
2022	The Fabelmans	Hark		
2023	Teenage Mutant Ninja Turtles: Mutant Mayhem	Leonardo (voice)		
2025	Teenage Mutant Ninja Turtles: Chrome Alone 2 – Lost in New Jersey	Leonardo (voice)	Short film	
2027	Untitled Teenage Mutant Ninja Turtles: Mutant Mayhem sequel	Leonardo (voice)		

=== Television ===
Year	Title	Role	Note	Ref
2016	Dora and Friends: Into the City!	Diego Márquez, Crocodile, Polar Bear (voice)	2 episodes	
2016–17	Lego Star Wars: The Freemaker Adventures	Rowan Freemaker (voice)	31 episodes	
2016–18	Future-Worm!	Paco (voice)	6 episodes	
2016–18	Sofia the First	Prince James (voice)	14 episodes	
2016–19	The Powerpuff Girls	Additional voices		
2017–19	The Amazing World of Gumball	Gumball Watterson, additional voices	71 episodes	
2017	Teachers	Quinn	1 episode	
2017	Walk the Prank	Kid #1	1 episode	
2017	Raven's Home	Travis	1 episode	
2018	The Good Place	Raymond	1 episode	
2019	Bizaardvark	Jackson	1 episode	
2019	Sydney to the Max	Dominic	1 episode	
2019	DuckTales	B.O.Y.D. (voice)	1 episode	
2019	Middle School Moguls	Winston (voice)	4 episodes	
2019–20	The Unicorn	Andrew		
2019–20	DreamWorks Dragons: Rescue Riders	Dak (voice)	26 episodes	
2020	Where's Waldo?	Rhys (voice)	1 episode	
2020	Puppy Dog Pals	Teia (voice)	1 episode	
2020–21	The Walking Dead: World Beyond	Elton Ortiz	20 episodes	
2021	The Rookie	Dennis Kern		1 episode
2021	9-1-1: Lone Star	JJ	2 episodes	
2021–22	Kid Cosmic	Ensign Mainstay (voice)	2 episodes	
2022	Family Guy	High School Kid by the Bleachers (voice)	1 episode	
2022	Oddballs	Smooth/Wrinkly Jason (voice)	2 episodes	
2023	American Born Chinese	Barry	2 episodes	
2023	Hailey's On It!	Otto (voice)	1 episode	
2023	Skull Island	Charlie (voice)	8 episodes	
2024	Star Wars: Tales of the Empire	Dante (voice)	1 episode	
2024	Dream Productions	Rubin (voice)	Episode: "Part 3: Romance!"	
2024–25	Tales of the Teenage Mutant Ninja Turtles	Leonardo (voice)	24 episodes	
2025	Common Side Effects	Tommy (voice)	Episode: "Star-Tel-Lite"	
2025	Motorheads	Marcel	10 episodes	

=== Video games ===
Year	Title	Voice role	Note	Ref
2021	Neo: The World Ends with You	Hazuki Mikagi	English version	
2024	Teenage Mutant Ninja Turtles: Mutants Unleashed	Leonardo		

== Nominations ==
Year	Award	Category	Work	Result	Ref
2018	Annie Award	Outstanding Achievement for Voice Acting in an Animated Television/Broadcast Production	The Amazing World of Gumball, episode "The Grades"	Nominated	
2019	Young Artist Award	Best Performance in a Voice-Acting Role: Teen Artist	Sofia the First	Nominated	
