= Raphael (Teenage Mutant Ninja Turtles) =

Fictional mutant

- Teenage Mutant Ninja Turtles character
- Textless Planet Awesome exclusive cover variant of Teenage Mutant Ninja Turtles #84. Art by series co-creator Kevin Eastman
- First appearance: Teenage Mutant Ninja Turtles #1 (May 1984)
- Created by: Kevin Eastman; Peter Laird
- Portrayed by: Mainline: Josh Pais (1990 film); Kenn Scott (The Secret of the Ooze); Matt Hill (Teenage Mutant Ninja Turtles III); Mitchell A. Lee Yuen (Ninja Turtles: The Next Mutation); Alan Ritchson (2014 and 2016 films)
- Voiced by: Mainline: Rob Paulsen (1987 series, Operation Blue Line, 2012 series crossover episodes, Nickelodeon All-Star Brawl, Shredder's Revenge, Nickelodeon Kart Racers 3: Slime Speedway); Josh Pais (1990 film); Laurie Faso (Secret of the Ooze); Tim Kelleher (Teenage Mutant Ninja Turtles III); Michael J. Gough (1987 series Season 10); Matt Hill (The Next Mutation); Greg Abbey (2003 series, Turtles in Time Re-Shelled, Smash-Up, Turtles Forever); Nolan North (2007 film and video game); Sean Astin (2012 series, Danger of the Ooze, Half-Shell Heroes: Blast to the Past, Portal Power); Alan Ritchson (2014 and 2016 films); Omar Benson Miller (Rise of the Teenage Mutant Ninja Turtles series and film); Brady Noon (Mutant Mayhem, 2024 series); Others: Hal Rayle (1987 series "Vacation in Europe" side-season arc); Sebastian Arcelus ('87 counterpart in Turtles Forever); Sean Schemmel (Mirage counterpart in Turtles Forever); Carlos Alazraqui (2013 video game); Roy Samuelson (2014 film tie-in games); Darren Criss (Turtles Take Time (and Space), DC crossover film)

In-universe information
- Species: Mutant turtle
- Affiliation: Teenage Mutant Ninja Turtles
- Weapon: Twin sai
- Family: Master Splinter (adoptive father); Leonardo, Donatello, and Michelangelo (brothers)
- Home: New York Sewers, United States
- Abilities: Mastery of ninjutsu, kobudō, chi gong, and stealth; Superhuman agility, speed, and strength; Mastery of sai and tonfa; Self-replication (Rise of the TMNT)

Raphael, nicknamed Raph, is a superhero and one of the four main characters of the Teenage Mutant Ninja Turtles comics and all related media. In most iterations, he is depicted as the most aggressive of the turtle brothers, physically the strongest and often at odds with his brother, Leonardo.

He is typically styled wearing a red eye mask and is the only turtle to have kept this color since the characters' original version, as the others later adopted different ones. Raphael wields twin sai as his primary weapon. He is commonly portrayed in media as speaking with a Brooklyn accent. Raphael is known for his temperamental and cynical personality, being short-tempered, aggressive, rude, sullen, sarcastic and rebellious. The origin of Raphael's anger is not always fully explored, but in some incarnations appears to stem partly from the realization that they are the only creatures of their kind and ultimately alone, while also bothered by the injustice the helpless and innocent suffer. Despite his fiery personality, he has shown a soft side on many occasions, mainly to Michelangelo.

Raphael is an opinionated and independent character who chafes under authority. He serves as the team's enforcer. The combination of his personality and role contributes to his rivalry and frequent arguments with his brother and leader, Leonardo. When he feels as though Leonardo's decision is not in the best interest of the family, for whatever reason, he is sure to voice it. Raphael would often brandish his tough-guy attitude with aggressive lines like "Why sneak around when you can bash some heads instead?".

However, in a later iteration of the franchise, Rise of the Teenage Mutant Ninja Turtles, his role as protector takes precedence over his traditional characterization and his dynamics with his brothers. In this series, Raphael is the eldest brother and his dynamic with Leonardo is effectively swapped—with Raphael now admonishing Leonardo for his irresponsible attitude and disregard for his role as leader.

Like all of the brothers, he is named after a Renaissance artist; in this case, he is named after the 16th-century Italian painter Raphael. In 2011, Raphael placed 23rd on IGN's Top 100 Comic Book Heroes, a list that did not feature any of his brothers. He is the only Teenage Turtle brother whose name does not end in the letter "O", even though the artist he got his name from is "Raffaello".

== Comic books ==
=== Mirage Comics ===
In the earliest black-and-white Mirage Comics, Raphael was the most violent turtle and had a tendency for going berserk either in battle or when his temper flared up. He has a somewhat cynical and sarcastic sense of humor. In later issues, it is shown that he is not particularly fond of the supernatural, stating so explicitly in Tales of Raphael: Bad Moon Rising.

Raphael mellowed somewhat as the series went on, possibly a key moment for his character development was when he allowed Leonardo to go in alone to defeat The Shredder after nearly being killed by the Foot Elite. Since then, he has become less inclined to question Leonardo's leadership and generally shows greater friendliness toward his family and allies.

Of his three brothers, Raphael is closest to Michelangelo, having stated this in the fourth issue of the Mirage TMNT comics. Raphael often shows a caring, more laid-back, side of himself when around Mikey, frequently indulging the young turtle emotionally when at home and ferociously protecting him from harm when in battle. Raphael openly admits that the mere thought of Mikey being grievously injured causes him to experience violent rage. In his self-titled one-shot miniseries, Raphael meets human vigilante Casey Jones, his foil, who is more violent and unstable than he was. Despite their brutal first meeting, the two have since formed a close bond.

In the Mirage comic book series' Volume 4, he is still the most violent turtle but is more sociable. After having been bitten by a vampire-like creature, he experienced a further mutation and became a large, dinosaur-like version of himself. He went into a state of berserk animal rage because of it, but with some guidance from an inner manifestation of Master Splinter, he regained his original mentality and later assisted Leonardo and Casey Jones in tracking down the vampires who attacked him. This is also somewhat similar to an earlier storyline during Volume 1, where Raphael was attacked by a leech-like creature who, when sucking his blood, also drained him of the mutagen in his body and reverted him to a small turtle. The leech itself mutated and vanished, prompting the remaining turtles to follow it. Finally, after tracking down the creature, Raphael manages to bite it and pierce its skin, thereby drinking its blood and mutating it back.

This incarnation of Raphael appeared in the crossover special Turtles Forever voiced by Sean Schemmel.

=== Image Comics ===
In the Image series that treated the first two volumes of the Mirage Comics as canonical, Raphael was blasted in the face and disfigured. After that, he wore one of Casey Jones' hockey masks for much of the time, and eventually just an eye patch. Later, Raphael wore Shredder's armor in an attempt to psychologically dominate a number of the New York Mob, with whom the Foot Clan was engaged in a losing gang war. He donned a slightly variant version of the armor and pretended to be the Shredder to get the advantage on his pursuers. He succeeded in defeating them and was then accepted into, and given control of, the New York faction of the Foot Clan for a brief time. In the independent published series of Image Comics #24, Raphael had an eyepatch and red bandana for the whole issue and was even angrier than ever. He killed Cheng with whom he had been friends in issue #25, and as soon as Pimiko was killed by the gauntlet of Lady Shredder, Raph removed his bandana and eyepatch to reveal his left eye was no longer disfigured but was back to normal. He later said to Leonardo he had a thing for Pimiko, and like Donatello with Baxter Stockman's help in ridding him of cyborg parts, Raphael kept his crush on Pimiko a secret.

=== Archie Comics ===
The Archie Comics series was titled Teenage Mutant Ninja Turtles Adventures and began as a direct adaptation of the popular cartoon series in the late 1980s. After the second story arc, Raphael changed costumes and began wearing an all-dark ninja outfit which he won during an Alien Wrestling Match. He would be the first member of the Teenage Mutant Ninja Turtles to have a girlfriend, meeting Ninjara in issue #28 and breaking up near the end of the magazine's 75-issue run. In the future, Raphael would lose an eye during a conflict with the Shredder, Verminator X, and Armaggon (in most of the future timeline incarnations of Raphael, his left eye is missing). He would time travel after his brother Donatello invented the technology and eventually retire on the island Turtleco (which used to be Manhattan) and become a bar owner.

=== IDW Comics ===
In the IDW Comics, Raphael, like his brothers, is one of the reincarnated sons of Hamato Yoshi, who was murdered by Oroku Saki in medieval Japan. He began his new life in the present as a young turtle in the laboratory of StockGen Research, Inc., Baxter Stockman's genetics laboratory, and served as a guinea pig for an experiment to be grown to be a naturally armored super soldier. Some ninjas tried to seize the Turtles and various other research results from the laboratory, including a mutagen. The intervention also led his reincarnated father, now a lab rat, and the Turtles to be doused with a chemical cocktail that triggered their mutation.

Shortly before his mutation, Raphael was separated from his family during an attack from a hungry street cat. He panicked as he mutated and was taken under the wing of a homeless man named Buck. However, Buck was murdered by street thugs, inspiring rage and grief in Raphael.

In the fifteen months after his mutation, he resided as a vagrant on the streets of New York City without a memory of his life before his transformation, or even of a name. During this time, his brothers regularly searched for him but did not find him. After befriending Casey Jones during a domestic dispute, Raphael was attacked by Old Hob, the street cat now mutated, but the other Turtles intervened and brought an uncertain but happy Raphael home to Splinter. He trained extensively with them for the next month, making incredible progress and being rewarded with a pair of sais.

His new family's status was soon put to the test when their home was attacked by M.O.U.S.E.R. robots and Splinter was abducted. Raphael fought alongside his brothers to get their father back but came to the attention of the Shredder and the Foot Clan in the process.

Despite joining his brothers in their training and patrols, Raphael maintained his friendship with Casey by sometimes going out and assaulting criminals. When Casey was badly beaten by his father, Raphael lost his temper and set out to murder the man, but was stopped by Splinter, who taught him that he fights with too much anger.

His anger was turned inward during the City Fall storyline, in which rescuing a stabbed Casey from Shredder led to Leonardo being captured by the Foot Clan and brainwashed by Kitsune, becoming loyal to the Foot and Shredder, becoming murderous and sinister. Devastated, Raphael blamed the entire event on himself, and savagely attacked Foot Clan from informants until Michelangelo and Donatello stopped him. When Splinter and the Turtles tried to extract the brainwashed Leonardo from Shredder's clutches, Raphael managed to penetrate some of the brainwashing and remind Leo of who they were.

At the O'Neil Farm in Northampton, Raphael clashed again with the emotionally disturbed Leonardo, until Leonardo physically attacked him. From then on, Raphael watched and guarded his brother from a distance; including keeping Alopex away from him but did not engage him. He became more friendly with the mutant fox Alopex, though any trust he had for her was still shaky and he incorrectly believed that she had betrayed them when the Foot attacked.

Due to Hob's early efforts to kill him, Raphael remained extremely wary of Old Hob and did not believe that their family should be working with him. Despite this wariness, he still went on errands to Hob on Splinter's behalf.

During the Turtles in Time event, Raphael was captured by Utroms in prehistoric times and adopted a small dinosaur he named Pepperoni. When Leonardo attempted to change the past by killing Oroku Saki in medieval Japan, it was Raphael who talked him out of it. He participated in the attack on the Technodrome with his brothers Leonardo and Michelangelo, where they fought Krang. However, he was devastated upon returning to New York, where a dying Donatello was barely saved by the Fugitoid by being transferred into the body of the robot Metalhead. Raphael remained convinced that Donatello was not really "alive" and that the Fugitoid would not be able to save his life. In particular, he blamed himself for leaving Donatello behind.

When Splinter entered his family into the Gauntlet, an ancient ritual that would end the bloody conflict between them and the Foot, Raphael was pitted against the powerful but dimwitted Rocksteady, who had nearly beaten Donatello to death. He and Michelangelo used their skill and agility to pit Bebop and Rocksteady against each other. He participated in the final fight against Shredder along with his brothers, with his father as the victor.

When his father became leader of the Foot Clan, Raphael reluctantly joined as well, though he remained somewhat distant from it compared to Leonardo. He also remained in contact with their newly estranged brother Michelangelo, assuring him that he knew how hard it was to be homeless, and that Michelangelo would always have a home with them.

The brothers reunited for a trip to Burnow Island shortly thereafter, where they encountered a mysterious alligator mutant named Leatherhead. Raphael and Leonardo also sought out two of Krang's remaining warriors, Tragg and Granitor, only to be knocked out by Leatherhead. They pursued the alligator to New York but lost him.

Upon returning home, Raphael and his brothers were horrified to see Kitsune about to kill Splinter, and a brainwashed Alopex assisting her. Kitsune ensnared Raphael's mind and turned him against Leonardo.

Raphael attempted to reconcile Michelangelo with his family in the Chasing Phantoms arc, in which he argued that Michelangelo should be with them, even if their new place was as part of the Foot Clan. However, he became increasingly uncomfortable with Splinter's methods. And upon Splinter's execution of Darius Dun, Raphael changed his mind and decided that Michelangelo had been right all along, leaving the Foot Clan along with Donatello and Leonardo, and moving back into their old lair.

During the days that followed, Raphael participated in a raucous Christmas party, assisted Angel Bridge in bringing a traumatized Alopex back to New York, and infiltrated the Pantheon Family Reunion, with nearly-deadly results. He returned to Dimension X with his brothers in The Trial of Krang story arc, in which they were required to bring back a collection of key witnesses to testify against Krang. During the trial, he participated in the defense of Planet Neutrino from the Malignoid swarm. Afterward, he and his brothers were attacked by the Collectors, and Raphael was forced to go on an inter-dimensional journey with Ray Stantz, resulting in his body temporarily being stolen by Viking ghosts.

His strained relationship with Splinter became even more so when the Turtles returned to Earth, and found the Foot Clan in conflict with the Triceratons. When Splinter attempted to imprison the Turtles for their safety, Raphael was particularly outraged. He later accompanied his brothers to attempt to defuse the situation, defeating the Elite Foot ninja in the process. When Bishop attacked Burnow Island, Raphael was reluctant to assist the Utroms and Triceratons but accompanied his brothers anyway.

He was captured by Agent Bishop shortly afterward and experimented on, as the E.P.F. wished to know what made the Turtles different from other mutants. They intended to kill and dissect him, but Raphael broke free and escaped, reminded of Buck and his losses and pain from the past. He defeated many E.P.F. personnel, before being rescued by Casey, Angel, and Alopex.

== Television ==
=== 1987 animated series ===
Raphael's personality in the 1987 animated series deviates the most from all other incarnations, though the show's theme song states that Raphael is "cool, but rude" (he takes a slice of pizza with his sai and shoves the rest of it onto the screen before eating the selected slice). Although his violent temper is toned down, Raphael still can get cranky when annoyed or angry.

Raphael is a sardonic wise guy, and supplies alongside Michelangelo, whose humor is usually attributed to his carefree and fun-loving behavior, whereas Raphael is more sardonic and sarcastic.

Michelangelo and Raphael's relationship is not exactly confrontational. However, Raphael would make fun of or get annoyed with Michelangelo's antics. Furthermore, Raphael's relationship with Leonardo is not as strained in the animated series. Despite this, Raphael usually served as a contrast to Leonardo's "gung-ho do-gooder" personality with his pessimistic, sarcastic remarks. However, Raphael did challenge Leonardo's leadership once in the season 8 episode "Turtle Trek". With Donatello, Raphael is usually the first to question or mock any miscalculations or malfunctions of his teammate's inventions. On the other hand, the other three turtles find Raphael's jokes unamusing.

In the 1987 series, Raphael's voice actor is Rob Paulsen from season one to season nine with Thom Pinto as the 1989 alternate, Hal Rayle as the 1993 alternate, and Michael Gough in the final season. In Turtles Forever, the 1987 version of Raphael is voiced by Sebastian Arcelus. Raphael also made a couple of appearances in the 2012 series in the episode, The Manhattan Project. He and the other turtles along with Casey and April are seen through a portal by their 2012 counterparts walking on a road and he makes a speaking cameo along with the other turtles at the end of the episode when a space worm from the 2012 dimension starts terrorizing the street. All four turtles see the worm and spring into action while shouting their famous catchphrase, 'Cowabunga'. This would be Rob Paulsen's second role in the 2012 series, the other being Donatello while he returned to his role as Raphael for the cameo. This would mark the first time in over 28 years the 1987 TMNT cast would return to their roles. Paulsen once again provided the voices of the 1987 Raphael and the 2012 Donatello in the season 4 episode, "Trans-Dimensional Turtles" and the three-part series final "Wanted: Bebop & Rocksteady".

=== Coming Out of Their Shells tour ===
A live-action "Coming Out of Their Shells" concert tour, whose inaugural show was broadcast on pay-per-view from Radio City Music Hall and later released on VHS in 1990. The concert depicted the Turtles as having formed a band, and beginning their tour in their canonical home of New York City. Raphael is stated during the song Cowabunga as having written the music for all the songs performed at the concert, while Michelangelo provided the lyrics. In the inaugural show, Raphael is depicted as playing the drums, including an electronic device that imitates drum sounds that he can control and adjust as necessary. He also splits lead vocals with Michelangelo. Like his film counterpart released the same year, Raphael is depicted as more prone to anger than the rest of his brothers, but ultimately able to get past his issues to help the Turtles defeat Shredder's plan to steal all the world's music. In the Making Of VHS tape which was released as a supplement to the Radio City Music Hall show and depicted the Turtles as if they were real people, Raphael and Michelangelo relate the story of how the band started; The two were waiting on a pizza delivery, and Raphael had begun playing on some sewer pipes, and Michelangelo joined in with a bit of singing. Realizing they enjoyed making music, they began to pursue it as a serious hobby, eventually bringing Leonardo and Donatello into their activities, leading to them forming the band and eventually going on tour.

One of the actors to portray Raphael during the tour was Michael Ian Black.

=== 1997 live-action series ===
Raphael appears in the live-action series, Ninja Turtles: The Next Mutation, as well as its crossover episode with Power Rangers in Space portrayed by Mitchell A. Lee Yuen and voiced by Matt Hill.

=== 2003 animated series ===
In the 2003 series, Raphael is voiced by Greg Abbey and speaks with a Brooklyn accent. In this incarnation, he has a dark, bright green skin color, much more vivid than those of his brothers. This version of Raphael has a personality that is more akin to his Mirage incarnation - he is angrier and more sardonic, but not quite as violent as his darker personality from the comics, unless furious - as proven in one incident where he almost smashed Michelangelo's head in with a pipe after Mikey beat him in a sparring match. The theme song for seasons 1-3 did not have a part that described each turtle individually, but from season 4 onwards it was changed, and stated, "Count on Raphael to throw the first punch".

His relationship with Leonardo is brotherly and they sometimes bicker due to their strong opinions. He is the first of the turtles to shed tears when Leonardo is gravely injured and might not survive. Overall Raphael is close with him.

His relationship with Donatello is a more mellow one compared to his other two brothers. They get along very well and they have a close bond like twins. He is usually the first to compliment his invention. Raphael's favorite of Donatello's inventions is the Shell Cycle. He uses it very often.

However, Raphael's relationship with Michelangelo is very difficult. Michelangelo would annoy Raphael with his antics and insults, and Raphael would put up a fight or reprimand him. Both of them tend to argue with each other. However, when Michelangelo is in danger, Raphael would help him. Overall, it is just a love-hate relationship.

Raphael is generally very protective of his brothers, getting outraged when an enemy harms them or captures them. His best friend is generally regarded as Casey Jones and is the best man at Casey and April O'Neil's wedding in the final episode of this series.

=== 2012 animated series ===
Raphael, as depicted in the 2012 Nickelodeon series.

Raphael is voiced by Sean Astin in the 2012 series.

Raphael's character design was updated, giving him green eyes as well as a small, lightning-shaped chip out of his plastron across his left shoulder (a scar that resulted from an injury Raphael received as a baby). In this incarnation, Raphael is described (in the theme song) as having "the most attitude on the team". Raphael can get incredibly explosive when he feels hurt or misunderstood. Sometimes he would walk out on the team to do his own thing or prove himself better, which has happened many times.

Raphael's behavior is inconsistent throughout the series. Sometimes he would cooperate and take orders and sometimes he will rebel. His relationship with Leonardo is strained. Raphael would erupt at Leonardo, who would either try to calm him down or confront him. Raphael hated the fact that Leonardo was the leader and often tried to take over as leader, even succeeding twice as the Seasons progressed. In Season 5, Raphael does not backtalk to Leonardo as much as he did in the earlier season probably because Leonardo is the sensei and has more control when it comes to Raphael. Despite all of this, Leonardo and Raphael are very close and care deeply for each other. They would team up to fight and challenge Donatello and Michelangelo during training.

Raphael's relationship with his two brothers Michelangelo and Donatello is not as bad as his relationship with Leonardo but it can be tense at times. Sometimes he would attack or challenge them, especially in training and other times they would team up to mock Leonardo. When Michelangelo annoys him, Raphael insults him. However, Raphael is a big brother to Mikey and serves as his role model, reassuring and comforting him and even saying he is awesome at one point. Raphael's relationship with Donatello often involves counterarguments. Donatello and Raphael would sometimes argue and insult each other like Donatello calls him a "big baby" whenever Raphael erupts or when Raphael calls Donatello a "dork". When Raphael behaves in an upsetting manner and when his brothers confront him, he will get in denial at first but then he will reluctantly or willingly apologize.

Raphael has a soft spot for his pets which helps him calm him down. A normal pet turtle named Spike, later mutates and becomes this show's version of Slash. Later on, he got an alien turtle named Chompy Picasso. Raphael is also petrified of cockroaches until he manages to defeat the mutant cockroach, Spyroach.

=== 2018 animated series ===
Raphael as depicted in Rise of the Teenage Mutant Ninja Turtles: The Movie

In the 2018 animated series, Rise of the Teenage Mutant Ninja Turtles, Omar Benson Miller voices Raphael, who in this incarnation is the eldest turtle brother and physically biggest brother, being mutated from an Alligator Snapping Turtle. Before Leonardo being named the official team leader by Splinter in the second season finale, Raph is the team's de facto leader, a change from previous incarnations, and his enthusiasm and bravado put him front and center for most of their bizarre adventures. Unlike past versions, he does not use his trademarked Sai, but rather he uses a pair of Tonfa. However, he obtains his trademark Sai in the final episodes after Shredder destroys his Tonfa. He is also considerably less angry and more serious than previous incarnations, though still eager to get into fights.

In Rise of the Teenage Mutant Ninja Turtles: The Movie, Raph has a heated argument with Leo over the latter's high ego and tells him how hard it is being a leader. Raph sacrifices himself to the Krang to save Leo from being captured and ends up paradoxically possessed for part of the film. Leo helps Raph break free and the two reconcile at the end of the movie after Leo defeats the Krang.

=== Tales of the TMNT (2024) ===
Raph appears in Tales of the Teenage Mutant Ninja Turtles, a follow-up 2d-animated series sequel to Teenage Mutant Ninja Turtles: Mutant Mayhem, with Brady Noon reprising his role from the latter film.

== Movies ==
=== Original trilogy (1990–1993) ===
In the 1990 film adaptation, Raphael is played by Josh Pais; the only actor to play both the physical (in the suit) and voice roles as a turtle. He speaks with a distinctive tough-sounding New York accent (that was imitated in the later versions of TMNT) and is the turtle whose character is explored most completely. He has a quick temper, uses profanity, and verbally challenges his brother Leonardo. This film focuses more so on his feeling of isolation from his brothers and his sense of regret and anger when Splinter is eventually captured by the Shredder. Here, it is established that he shares a closer relationship with news reporter April O'Neil having saved her from the Foot Clan on several occasions.

In Teenage Mutant Ninja Turtles II: The Secret of the Ooze, he is played by Kenn Troum, and voiced by Laurie Faso, and in the Teenage Mutant Ninja Turtles III film he is played by Matt Hill, and voiced by Tim Kelleher. In the films, he is still angry and occasionally goes off by himself in the second movie, but has a soft spot for the young people the team meets. It is also shown that he has an appreciation for nature as it appears to calm him.

=== 2007 film ===
In TMNT, Raphael (voiced by Nolan North) is the only member of the Turtles who has continued to fight evil and crime on the streets in the absence of their leader, Leonardo; he has spent his nights as an armored vigilante known as The Nightwatcher. His time as the Nightwatcher is one of the few instances in which Raphael does not use his trademark sai; instead, he uses a manriki: weighted chains that can be concealed in the hands and used from considerable distances. Unlike his sai, the manikin are typically non-lethal weapons (though they could prove fatal if used with enough force).

Raphael keeps his solo vigilantism a secret from his family, however, which leads to tension and distrust between him and Donatello in particular (as Donatello is implied to be the one in charge in Leonardo's absence). Donatello claims that "all [Raphael does] is sleep all day" and that at least he and Michelangelo contribute to the household. Raphael aggressively confronts him and sarcastically agrees that he does nothing, Donatello has him all figured out. Donatello claims that Raphael's tendency to rely on fear to accomplish things (i.e. get what he wants) is wrong. Raphael responds by threatening to punch him, causing Donatello to flinch; Raphael smirks and claims he made his point.

Raphael's relationship with Michelangelo is not touched upon much in the movie, but they do not seem to have the same antagonistic relationship that Raphael has with his other brothers. This may be in part because Michelangelo is shown on multiple occasions to admire the Nightwatcher.

What takes center stage, however, is Raphael's rocky relationship with Leonardo. The animosity between them in this adaptation is arguably the most intense of the iterations. It is made apparent that Raphael resents Leonardo for leaving (or perhaps only because he stayed away an additional year past his original indeterminate training period). Master Splinter informs Leonardo, upon his return, that he should speak with Raphael as his "absence has been particularly difficult for [Raphael], though [Raphael] will never admit it".

Raphael's anger grows when Leonardo acts as though nothing has changed—treating his brothers like his "little soldiers" despite (at least from Raphael's perspective) abandoning them. This is compounded by Leonardo insulting the Nightwatcher and his methods to which Raphael replies that "crime never took a break, you did".

The tension between Raphael and Leonardo comes to a head when Leonardo later confronts the Nightwatcher. The confrontation devolves into a physical altercation in which Raphael's identity is revealed. After a verbal altercation, they begin to fight anew. They appear equally matched, until Raphael is visibly overtaken by rage, breaks Leonardo's katana, and barely refrains from mortally wounding him. Similar to previous iterations, Raphael retreats in a panic after realizing what his anger almost led to. Due to his disarmed state and exhaustion, Leonardo is easily subdued and kidnapped—for which Raphael feels responsible.

Raphael returns to the lair and in a fit of self-recrimination, confesses to Master Splinter that he understands why Leonardo is "the better son and [he] is not". Master Splinter responds by explaining that Raphael's tendency to bear "the world's problems on [his] shoulders" is an admirable quality as a protector and emphasizes that while Raphael may not be his favorite student at times, that does not mean he is his least favorite son. He tells Raphael that his strength, passion, and loyalty are also merits of a great leader, but only if they can be tempered with compassion and humility. Though Master Splinter's words seem to calm him, Raphael still shows resistance to the compliments and admits his grave mistake: his actions led to Leonardo being taken.

Raphael, his family, Casey, and April rescue Leonardo. When they locate him inside Winter's tower, Raphael personally hands Leonardo a new set of katana. Throughout the final battle, the brothers seamlessly fight alongside one another, instead of against one another.

After the battle, the movie ends with Raphael retiring as the Nightwatcher and placing his helmet among memorabilia in Splinter's shrine.

The movie ends with Raphael narrating about the importance of his bonds with his brothers over top of the classic scene of the turtles leaping across rooftops together.

=== Reboot series (2014–2016) ===
Raphael appears in Teenage Mutant Ninja Turtles portrayed by Alan Ritchson. In the film, he is aggressive and struggles with following orders. He often loses his temper and has fierce independence, which does not sit well with his brother Leonardo. He is the first turtle that April O'Neil sees after stopping the Foot Clan, although she does not get a good look at him and thinks he is a man. When April takes their picture, Raph threatens her even after Donatello erases her phone's memory data. In the battle at the turtle's lair with the Foot, Raph is crushed under rubble and is presumed dead. Because of this, he is the only turtle not captured by the Foot. When he awakes, he finds a dying Splinter who tells him and April to save his brothers. They team up with Vern Fenwick to help him save them from Sacks Industries, where he fights Shredder to buy April and Vern time to do so. After rescuing Leonardo, Donatello, and Michelangelo and defeating the Shredder, Raphael and his brothers use the mutagen to save Splinter's life. He, along with Donatello and Leonardo, does not try to get April's attention, unlike Michelangelo who does voice his feelings to April. Although in the end of the movie, he does show appreciation to her for sacrificing everything for them. In this incarnation, Raphael is not as hot-headed and does not clash with Leonardo over leadership however they have a brief argument over the Hatamishi which Raphael refuses to go to and claims he will leave which Leo debunks. He is more close to his brothers in the film than in most adaptations. He still get annoyed at Donatello when he talks of his calculations in a way the others do not understand. He is the only turtle in the film to not wear any footwear, much like other adaptations of the turtles.

In the sequel, Teenage Mutant Ninja Turtles: Out of the Shadows, Raphael is shown to be more like his standard self. He becomes enraged when he learns Leonardo had ordered Donnie not to reveal to him or Mikey about the Purple Ooze being able to turn them into humans, stating that Leo broke the third code of the ninja (honor) by lying to his brothers. He disobeys direct orders from Leo and has no problem lying to April and Casey to get them to go along on a mission with him. He does still show caring for his brothers as he and Mikey are shown to be very close, with the two of them pulling pranks on Casey Jones and Raph becoming enraged when Krang nearly kills Mikey. Raphael in the film is also shown to have a fear of great heights, possibly due to the events of the first film; while the other turtles leap out of an airplane with little thought Raphael puts on a parachute and even then must psych himself up to perform the jump.

=== DC crossover film ===
Raphael appears in the direct-to-video crossover film Batman vs. Teenage Mutant Ninja Turtles, voiced by Darren Criss. At the beginning of the movie, he is seen among his brothers saving Barbara Gordon and stopping the Foot. They then fought the Penguin and his goons and later Batman, who easily defeats them and takes one of his sais.

=== Mutant Mayhem ===
Raphael appears in Teenage Mutant Ninja Turtles: Mutant Mayhem, the first animated Teenage Mutant Ninja Turtles film since TMNT (2007), voiced by real teenager Brady Noon. This version of the character is implied to have temperamental issues, as he is incapable of retaining his actions and becomes incredibly excited and unfocused when fighting. He ends up befriending Bebop and Rocksteady due to their shared love showing off their strength and abilities and is glad when they switch over to their side and become a family.

== Other appearances ==
In the first few video games, based on the 1987 cartoon, Raphael was an unpopular character because of the short range of his weapon. He is the least skilled Turtle, the same goes for the video game based on the 2007 movie TMNT. He appears in TMNT: Smash Up as a playable character, with Frank Frankson reprising his role. The Nightwatcher also makes an appearance as a separate playable character.

Raphael is one of the main playable characters in Teenage Mutant Ninja Turtles: Out of the Shadows video game, where he is voiced by Carlos Alazraqui. His special move is Iron Fists, where he puts on iron gloves which have extremely high power, but little range. Raphael also appears in the 2014 film-based game, voiced by Roy Samuelson.

Raphael is featured as one of the playable characters from Teenage Mutant Ninja Turtles as DLC in Injustice 2, voiced by Ben Rausch. While Leonardo is the default turtle outside the gear loadout, he, Michelangelo, and Donatello can only be picked through the said loadout selection similar to the premier skin characters.

Raphael is featured as a TMNT season pass in Smite as a Loki skin, voiced by Mark Whitten. He is also available as a skin in Brawlhalla.

Raphael appears in Pixel Gun 3D as a skin called "Super Turtle".

Raphael is also a main playable character in the sequel to Turtles in Time, titled Teenage Mutant Ninja Turtles: Shredder's Revenge. In the game, Raphael is now the turtle with the most attack power and average speed, as opposed to Turtles in Time, where he had the highest speed with average attack power. He carries over his limited range from the original game. This is the first official Teenage Mutant Ninja Turtles game in which he is played by his original voice actor, Rob Paulsen.

Raphael appears in Call of Duty: Black Ops 6 as a playable operator in the multiplayer and Zombies modes, voiced by Roger Craig Smith.

In 2023, Raphael appeared in Fortnite as an outfit in the shop. The Mutant Mayhem version of Raphael is set to appear as a playable character via downloadable content in Sonic Racing: CrossWorlds.

== Reception ==
In 2008, Raphael shared the fifth place with Leonardo on TechCrunch's list of Top 10 Video Game Ninja Characters. As mentioned above, he came in 23rd on IGN's list of Top 100 comic book heroes.

Omar Miller the voice actor for Raphael in Rise of the Teenage Mutant Ninja Turtles said, in an interview with ComicsBeat, that he had positive reception from fans toward the series and Raphael's developing role as a leader who makes mistakes and learn as he goes to get his skills together.

== See also ==
- Tsundere
