= Teenage Mutant Ninja Turtles in film =

Superhero characters in film

The Teenage Mutant Ninja Turtles, a superhero team created by Kevin Eastman and Peter Laird, have appeared in seven theatrical feature-length films since their debut. The first film was released in 1990, at the height of the franchise's popularity. Despite mixed reviews from critics, it was a commercial success that garnered two direct sequels, Teenage Mutant Ninja Turtles II: The Secret of the Ooze in 1991 and Teenage Mutant Ninja Turtles III in 1993, both of which were modest successes. An animated film titled TMNT was released in 2007.

Following the purchase of the Turtles franchise by Viacom in 2009, Paramount Pictures gained the exclusive theatrical film rights. The studio's first film which served as a reboot of the series was released in 2014. A sequel, Teenage Mutant Ninja Turtles: Out of the Shadows, was released in 2016 and was the first film in the franchise to be considered financially unsuccessful. An animated reboot film, Teenage Mutant Ninja Turtles: Mutant Mayhem was released in 2023. The seven films have grossed $1.3 billion worldwide.

== Films ==
Film	U.S. release date	Director(s)	Screenwriter(s)	Story by	Producer(s)
Original series
Teenage Mutant Ninja Turtles	March 30, 1990	Steve Barron	Todd W. Langen and Bobby Herbeck	Bobby Herbeck	Kim Dawson, Simon Fields and David Chan
Teenage Mutant Ninja Turtles II: The Secret of the Ooze	March 22, 1991	Michael Pressman	Todd W. Langen	Todd W. Langen	Thomas K. Gray, Kim Dawson and David Chan
Teenage Mutant Ninja Turtles III	March 19, 1993	Stuart Gillard	Stuart Gillard	Stuart Gillard	Thomas K. Gray, Kim Dawson and David Chan
Stand-alone films
TMNT	March 23, 2007	Kevin Munroe	Kevin Munroe	Kevin Munroe	Thomas K. Gray, Galen Walker and Paul Wang
Platinum Dunes reboot series
Teenage Mutant Ninja Turtles	August 8, 2014	Jonathan Liebesman	Josh Appelbaum & André Nemec and Evan Daugherty	Josh Appelbaum & André Nemec and Evan Daugherty	Michael Bay, Andrew Form, Brad Fuller, Galen Walker, Scott Mednick and Ian Bryce
Teenage Mutant Ninja Turtles: Out of the Shadows	June 3, 2016	Dave Green	Josh Appelbaum & André Nemec	Josh Appelbaum & André Nemec	Michael Bay, Andrew Form, Brad Fuller, Galen Walker and Scott Mednick
Point Grey reboot series
Teenage Mutant Ninja Turtles: Mutant Mayhem	August 2, 2023	Jeff Rowe Co-directed by: Kyler Spears	Seth Rogen & Evan Goldberg & Jeff Rowe and Dan Hernandez & Benji Samit	Brendan O'Brien and Seth Rogen & Evan Golberg & Jeff Rowe	Seth Rogen, Evan Goldberg and James Weaver
Untitled Teenage Mutant Ninja Turtles: Mutant Mayhem sequel	August 13, 2027	Jeff Rowe Co-directed by: Kyler Spears and Yashar Kassai	TBA	TBA	Seth Rogen, Evan Goldberg, James Weaver, Josh Fagen and Ramsey McBean

=== Original series (1990–1993) ===
==== Teenage Mutant Ninja Turtles (1990) ====
The film tells the origin story of Splinter and the Turtles, their initial encounters with April O'Neil and Casey Jones, and their first confrontation with the Shredder and his Foot Clan. It closely follows the storyline from the Mirage comic books, in addition to some of the more lighthearted elements of the cartoons. It was directed by Steve Barron and written by Todd W. Langen and Bobby Herbeck from a story by Herbeck. Kim Dawson, Simon Fields, and David Chan serve as producers. It stars Judith Hoag and Elias Koteas, with the voices of Brian Tochi, Josh Pais, Corey Feldman, and Robbie Rist. It also showcases the innovative puppetry techniques of Jim Henson's Creature Shop. Golden Harvest Entertainment Company, known for its Hong Kong action films, co-produced the film, which was released theatrically in the United States on March 30, 1990, by New Line Cinema.

==== Teenage Mutant Ninja Turtles II: The Secret of the Ooze (1991) ====
The film further expands the Turtles origin story and follows the four as they once again face Shredder, who is out for revenge. The sequel to the 1990 film features a more lighthearted tone than its predecessor. It was directed by Michael Pressman and written by Langen. Dawson, Chan, and Thomas K. Gray serve as producers. It stars Paige Turco and David Warner, with the voices of Tochi, Rist, Adam Carl, and Laurie Faso. The film was dedicated to puppeteer Jim Henson. Golden Harvest co-produced again, and the film was released theatrically in the United States on March 22, 1991, by New Line Cinema.

==== Teenage Mutant Ninja Turtles III (1993) ====
The plot revolves around the "Sacred Sands of Time", a mystical scepter which transports the Turtles and April back in time to feudal Japan, where they become embroiled in a conflict between a daimyo and a group of rebellious villagers. Written and directed by Stuart Gillard, it was produced by Dawson, Chan, and Gray. It stars Koteas, Turco, Vivian Wu, Sab Shimono, and Stuart Wilson with the voices of Tochi, Rist, Feldman, and Tim Kelleher. Golden Harvest co-produced again, and the film was released theatrically in the United States on March 19, 1993, by New Line Cinema.

=== Standalone film ===
==== TMNT (2007) ====
In the film, after having grown apart following the final defeat of their arch-enemy, the Shredder, the four Turtles — Leonardo, Raphael, Donatello, and Michelangelo (voiced respectively by James Arnold Taylor, Nolan North, Mitchell Whitfield, and Mikey Kelley) — are set to reunite and overcome their faults to save the world from evil ancient creatures. An animated film, it was written and directed by Kevin Munroe, and produced by Thomas K. Gray, Galen Walker, and Paul Wang. It features an ensemble voice cast including Chris Evans, Sarah Michelle Gellar, Mako, Kevin Smith, Patrick Stewart, and Ziyi Zhang, with narration by Laurence Fishburne. Produced by Imagi Animation Studios and distributed by Warner Bros. Pictures in the United States and The Weinstein Company internationally, it was the final Turtles film to be distributed by Warner Bros. due to the franchise being purchased by Viacom. The film was theatrically released in the United States on March 23, 2007.

=== Platinum Dunes reboot series (2014–2016) ===
==== Teenage Mutant Ninja Turtles (2014) ====
The plot follows the Turtles, who, with the help of their new ally April O'Neil, face the evil Shredder and his Foot Clan, as well as protect their New York City home. It serves as a reboot of the series and was directed by Jonathan Liebesman and written by Josh Appelbaum, André Nemec, and Evan Daugherty. Michael Bay and his Platinum Dunes partners Andrew Form and Brad Fuller co-produced the film, alongside Galen Walker, Scott Mednick, and Ian Bryce. The film stars Megan Fox, Will Arnett, William Fichtner, Danny Woodburn, Abby Elliott, Noel Fisher, Jeremy Howard, Pete Ploszek, and Alan Ritchson, with the voices of Johnny Knoxville and Tony Shalhoub. It was released in theaters on August 8, 2014 by Paramount Pictures.

==== Teenage Mutant Ninja Turtles: Out of the Shadows (2016) ====
The film follows the Turtles, who, after defeating the Shredder, must face an even bigger foe: the dreaded Krang. The sequel to the 2014 film, it was directed by Dave Green and written by Appelbaum and Nemec. Bay, Form, and Fuller of Platinum Dunes, as well as Walker and Mednick, returned to co-produce the film. Fox, Arnett, Fisher, Howard, Ploszek, and Ritchson reprise their roles, with Laura Linney, Stephen Amell, Tyler Perry, Gary Anthony Williams, Brian Tee, and Sheamus joining the cast. It was released in theatres in the United States on June 3, 2016 by Paramount Pictures.

=== Point Grey reboot series (2023–present) ===
==== Teenage Mutant Ninja Turtles: Mutant Mayhem (2023) ====
The film follows the Turtles, who, with the help of their new ally April O'Neil, go on a hunt for and face off against a mysterious crime boss, Superfly, and his gang of mutants. An animated film, it serves as being the second reboot of the series. The film was directed by Jeff Rowe and co-directed by Kyler Spears, from a screenplay and story written by Seth Rogen, Evan Goldberg, and Rowe, with Dan Hernandez and Benji Samit also credited to the former and Brendan O'Brien to the latter. Rogen, Goldberg, and James Weaver co-produced through their production company Point Grey Pictures. The film stars an ensemble voice cast with Micah Abbey, Shamon Brown Jr., Nicolas Cantu, and Brady Noon as the titular team, alongside Ayo Edebiri, Maya Rudolph, John Cena, Seth Rogen, Rose Byrne, Natasia Demetriou, Giancarlo Esposito, Jackie Chan, Ice Cube, and Paul Rudd. It was released in the United States on August 2, 2023, by Paramount Pictures.

==== Untitled Teenage Mutant Ninja Turtles: Mutant Mayhem sequel (2027) ====
A sequel to Mutant Mayhem is currently in development and is scheduled for the release of August 13, 2027. It will feature the character Shredder as a main antagonist who was teased at the end of Mutant Mayhem. Rowe is set to return as director alongside co-directors Spears and Yashar Kassai. Point Grey is set to co-produce again, with Rogen, Goldberg, Weaver, Josh Fagen, and Ramsay McBean as producers.

== Other films ==
=== Turtles Forever (2009) ===
The plot follows the Turtles of the 2003 animated television series as they team up with the Turtles of the 1987 television series and the Mirage comic books to save the multiverse from the wrath of Ch'Rell, the Utrom Shredder of the 2003 television series. The film was produced in celebration of the 25th anniversary of the franchise while also serving as the finale to the 2003 television series. It was directed by Roy Burdine and Lloyd Goldfine and written by Goldfine, Rob David, and Matthew Drdek. It aired on The CW4Kids on November 21, 2009.

=== Batman vs. Teenage Mutant Ninja Turtles (2019) ===
The story focuses on Batman, Robin, and Batgirl teaming up with the Teenage Mutant Ninja Turtles in order to save Gotham City from chaos at the hands of both Shredder and Ra's al Ghul. The film is an adaptation of the comic book miniseries Batman/Teenage Mutant Ninja Turtles by James Tynion IV and Freddie Williams II. A co-production between Warner Bros. Animation, Nickelodeon, and DC, it was directed by Jake Castorena and written by Marly Halpern-Graser and features the voices of Troy Baker, Eric Bauza, Darren Criss, Kyle Mooney, and Baron Vaughn. It was produced for the direct-to-video market, and was released on both Blu-ray and Digital HD by Warner Bros. Home Entertainment on June 4, 2019.

=== Rise of the Teenage Mutant Ninja Turtles: The Movie (2022) ===
In the film, the Turtles, with the help of their new ally from the future, Casey Jones, set out to stop the evil alien force, the Krang, from invading Earth. It is a continuation of the animated television series Rise of the Teenage Mutant Ninja Turtles (2018–20). The film was directed by series co-developers Andy Suriano and Ant Ward from a screenplay by Tony Gama-Lobo and Rebecca May, based on a story by Suriano and Ward. It stars the show's regular voice cast of Ben Schwartz, Omar Miller, Brandon Mychal Smith, Josh Brener, Kat Graham, and Eric Bauza, with newcomer Haley Joel Osment as Casey Jones. The film premiered on Netflix on August 5, 2022.

== Short film ==
=== Teenage Mutant Ninja Turtles: Chrome Alone 2 – Lost in New Jersey (2025) ===
An animated short film, set in the universe of Mutant Mayhem, Teenage Mutant Ninja Turtles: Chrome Alone 2 – Lost in New Jersey debuted at the Annecy International Animation Film Festival in June 2025, before it was released in theaters on December 19, along with screenings of The SpongeBob Movie: Search for SquarePants. The short was directed by Kent Seki, who served as head of cinematography on the 2023 feature film, and written by Andrew Joustra, who served as the script and recording coordinator on the feature. The short film follows the Turtles, who journey to New Jersey to confront a mysterious toy company exploiting their newfound fame.

== Recurring cast and crew ==
^{C} indicates the actor or actress portrayed their character through a costume.
^{D} indicates the actor or actress portrayed their character in deleted scenes.
^{M} indicates a performance through motion-capture technology.
^{P} indicates a performance through puppetry.
^{U} indicates the actor or actress was uncredited for their role.
^{V} indicates a performance through voice-work.
^{Y} indicates an actor or actress portrayed a younger version of their character.

=== Cast ===
Characters	Original series			TMNT	Platinum Dunes reboot series		Point Grey reboot series	
Characters	Teenage Mutant Ninja Turtles	Teenage Mutant Ninja Turtles II: The Secret of the Ooze	Teenage Mutant Ninja Turtles III	TMNT	Teenage Mutant Ninja Turtles	Teenage Mutant Ninja Turtles: Out of the Shadows	Teenage Mutant Ninja Turtles: Mutant Mayhem	Untitled 2027 Mutant Mayhem sequel
Leonardo	Brian Tochi^{V}	Brian Tochi^{V}	Brian Tochi^{V}	James Arnold Taylor^{V}	Johnny Knoxville^{V}	Pete Ploszek^{V}^{M}	Nicolas Cantu^{V}	Nicolas Cantu^{V}
Leonardo	David Forman^{C}	Mark Caso^{C}	Mark Caso^{C}	James Arnold Taylor^{V}	Pete Ploszek^{M}	Pete Ploszek^{V}^{M}	Nicolas Cantu^{V}	Nicolas Cantu^{V}
Leonardo	Martin P. Robinson^{P}	Rob Tygner^{P}	Jim Martin^{P}	James Arnold Taylor^{V}	Pete Ploszek^{M}	Pete Ploszek^{V}^{M}	Nicolas Cantu^{V}	Nicolas Cantu^{V}
Raphael	Josh Pais^{V}^{C}	Laurie Faso^{V}	Tim Kelleher^{V}	Nolan North^{V}	Alan Ritchson^{V}^{M}	Alan Ritchson^{V}^{M}	Brady Noon^{V}	Brady Noon^{V}
Raphael	Josh Pais^{V}^{C}	Kenn Troum^{C}	Matt Hill^{C}	Nolan North^{V}	Alan Ritchson^{V}^{M}	Alan Ritchson^{V}^{M}	Brady Noon^{V}	Brady Noon^{V}
Raphael	David Greenaway^{P}	David Greenaway^{P}	Noel MacNeal^{P}	Nolan North^{V}	Alan Ritchson^{V}^{M}	Alan Ritchson^{V}^{M}	Brady Noon^{V}	Brady Noon^{V}
Donatello	Corey Feldman^{V}	Adam Carl^{V}	Corey Feldman^{V}	Mitchell Whitfield^{V}	Jeremy Howard^{V}^{M}	Jeremy Howard^{V}^{M}	Micah Abbey^{V}	Micah Abbey^{V}
Donatello	Leif Tilden^{C}	Leif Tilden^{C}	Jim Raposa^{C}	Mitchell Whitfield^{V}	Jeremy Howard^{V}^{M}	Jeremy Howard^{V}^{M}	Micah Abbey^{V}	Micah Abbey^{V}
Donatello	David Rudman^{P}	Rob Mills^{P}	Rick Lyon^{P}	Mitchell Whitfield^{V}	Jeremy Howard^{V}^{M}	Jeremy Howard^{V}^{M}	Micah Abbey^{V}	Micah Abbey^{V}
Michelangelo	Robbie Rist^{V}	Robbie Rist^{V}	Robbie Rist^{V}	Mikey Kelley^{V}	Noel Fisher^{V}^{M}	Noel Fisher^{V}^{M}	Shamon Brown Jr.^{V}	Shamon Brown Jr.^{V}
Michelangelo	Michelan Sisti^{C}	Michelan Sisti^{C}	David Fraser^{C}	Mikey Kelley^{V}	Noel Fisher^{V}^{M}	Noel Fisher^{V}^{M}	Shamon Brown Jr.^{V}	Shamon Brown Jr.^{V}
Michelangelo	Mak Wilson^{P}	Mak Wilson^{P}	Gord Robertson^{P}	Mikey Kelley^{V}	Noel Fisher^{V}^{M}	Noel Fisher^{V}^{M}	Shamon Brown Jr.^{V}	Shamon Brown Jr.^{V}
Splinter	Kevin Clash^{V}^{P}	Kevin Clash^{V}^{P}	James Murray^{V}^{P}	Mako^{V}	Tony Shalhoub^{V}	Tony Shalhoub^{V}	Jackie Chan^{V}	Jackie Chan^{V}
Splinter	Ricky Boyd^{P}	Ricky Boyd^{P}	Lisa Sturz^{P}	Mako^{V}	Danny Woodburn^{M}	Peter Donald Badalamenti II^{M}	Jackie Chan^{V}	Jackie Chan^{V}
Splinter	Rob Tygner^{P}	Susan Dacre^{P}	Tim Lawrence^{P}	Greg Baldwin^{V}	Danny Woodburn^{M}	Peter Donald Badalamenti II^{M}	Jackie Chan^{V}	Jackie Chan^{V}
April O'Neil	Judith Hoag	Paige Turco	Paige Turco	Sarah Michelle Gellar^{V}	Megan Fox	Megan Fox	Ayo Edebiri^{V}	Ayo Edebiri^{V}
April O'Neil	Judith Hoag	Paige Turco	Paige Turco	Sarah Michelle Gellar^{V}	Malina Weissman^{Y}	Megan Fox	Ayo Edebiri^{V}	Ayo Edebiri^{V}
Oroku Saki The Shredder	James Saito	François Chau		Silent cameo	Tohoru Masamune	Brian Tee	Silent cameo	TBA
Oroku Saki The Shredder	James Saito	Kevin Nash		Silent cameo	Tohoru Masamune	Brian Tee	Silent cameo	TBA
Oroku Saki The Shredder	David McCharen^{V}	David McCharen^{V}		Silent cameo	Tohoru Masamune	Brian Tee	Silent cameo	TBA
Casey Jones	Elias Koteas		Elias Koteas	Chris Evans^{V}		Stephen Amell		
Tatsu	Toshishiro Obata	Toshishiro Obata						
Tatsu	Michael McConnohie^{V}	Michael McConnohie^{V}						
Chief Sterns	Raymond Serra	Raymond Serra						
Karai				Zhang Ziyi^{V}	Minae Noji	Brittany Ishibashi		
Vern Fenwick					Will Arnett	Will Arnett		
Baxter Stockman					K. Todd Freeman	Tyler Perry	Giancarlo Esposito^{V}	
Krang						Brad Garrett^{V}	Maya Rudolph^{V} (as Cynthia Utrom)	Maya Rudolph^{V} (as Cynthia Utrom)
Bebop						Gary Anthony Williams^{V}^{M}	Seth Rogen^{V}	TBA
Rocksteady						Sheamus^{V}^{M}	John Cena^{V}	TBA
List indicator: A dark grey cell indicates the character was not in the film.

=== Additional crew ===
Film	Crew/Detail					
Film	Composer(s)	Cinematographer(s)	Editor	Production companies	Distributing company	Running time
Teenage Mutant Ninja Turtles	John Du Prez	John Fenner	William D. Gordean, Sally Menke and James R. Symons	Golden Harvest, Limelight Entertainment, 888 Productions	New Line Cinema	93 minutes
Teenage Mutant Ninja Turtles II: The Secret of the Ooze	John Du Prez	Shelly Johnson	Steve Mirkovich and John Wright	Golden Harvest	New Line Cinema	88 minutes
Teenage Mutant Ninja Turtles III	John Du Prez	David Gurfinkel	William D. Gordean and James R. Symons	Golden Harvest	New Line Cinema	96 minutes
TMNT	Klaus Badelt	Steve Lumley	John Damien Ryan	Imagi Animation Studios	Warner Bros. Pictures	87 minutes
Teenage Mutant Ninja Turtles	Brian Tyler	Lula Carvalho	Joel Negron and Glen Scantlebury	Nickelodeon Movies, Platinum Dunes, Gama Entertainment, Mednick Productions, Heavy Metal	Paramount Pictures	101 minutes
Teenage Mutant Ninja Turtles: Out of the Shadows	Steve Jablonsky	Lula Carvalho	Jim May, Debra Neil-Fisher and Bob Ducsay	Nickelodeon Movies, Platinum Dunes, Gama Entertainment, Mednick Productions, Smithrowe Entertainment	Paramount Pictures	122 minutes
Teenage Mutant Ninja Turtles: Mutant Mayhem	Trent Reznor; Atticus Ross	Kent Seki	Greg Levitan	Nickelodeon Movies, Point Grey Pictures	Paramount Pictures	100 minutes

== Reception ==
=== Box office performance ===
Film	Release date	Box office gross			Box office ranking		Budget	Ref.
Film	Release date	North America	Other territories	Worldwide	All time North America	All time worldwide	Budget	Ref.
Original series
Teenage Mutant Ninja Turtles	March 30, 1990	$135,384,756	$66,700,000	$202,084,756	#331	#568	$13,500,000	
Teenage Mutant Ninja Turtles II: The Secret of the Ooze	March 12, 1991	$78,656,813	$12,000,000	$90,656,813	#804	N/A	$25,000,000	
Teenage Mutant Ninja Turtles III	March 19, 1993	$42,273,609	$12,214,177	$54,487,786	#1,665	N/A	$21,000,000	
Standalone films
TMNT	March 23, 2007	$54,149,098	$41,653,818	$95,802,916	#1,289	N/A	$34,000,000	
Platinum Dunes reboot series
Teenage Mutant Ninja Turtles	August 8, 2014	$191,204,754	$293,800,000	$485,004,754	#183	#157	$125,000,000	
Teenage Mutant Ninja Turtles: Out of the Shadows	June 3, 2016	$82,051,601	$163,572,247	$245,623,848	#829	#512	$135,000,000	
Point Grey reboot series
Teenage Mutant Ninja Turtles: Mutant Mayhem	August 2, 2023	$118,444,310	$61,900,000	$180,344,310	-	-	$70,000,000	
Total		$702,161,941	$651,840,242	$1,354,005,183			$423,500,000	
* The international gross listed above for Teenage Mutant Ninja Turtles II: The Secret of the Ooze is actually the theatrical rentals, which is the distributor's share of the gross. In the United States and Canada, the film earned theatrical rentals of $41.9 million. If the ratio of gross to rental achieved in the United States was matched overseas, the film would have an international gross of around $22 million and a worldwide gross of around $100 million.

=== Critical and public response ===
Film	Critical		Public
Film	Rotten Tomatoes	Metacritic	CinemaScore
Teenage Mutant Ninja Turtles	46% (57 reviews)	51 (21 reviews)	—N/a
Teenage Mutant Ninja Turtles II: The Secret of the Ooze	35% (43 reviews)	45 (20 reviews)	—N/a
Teenage Mutant Ninja Turtles III	19% (32 reviews)	40 (12 reviews)	—N/a
TMNT	35% (118 reviews)	41 (21 reviews)	A-
Teenage Mutant Ninja Turtles	20% (163 reviews)	31 (33 reviews)	B
Teenage Mutant Ninja Turtles: Out of the Shadows	38% (173 reviews)	40 (30 reviews)	A-
Teenage Mutant Ninja Turtles: Mutant Mayhem	95% (251 reviews)	74 (47 reviews)	A

== Future ==
=== Second live-action reboot ===
Paramount Pictures has been planning another live-action reboot of the series since 2018. Colin Jost and Casey Jost were attached as writers of the script, while the producer Neal H. Moritz of Original Film joined the film. The film is scheduled to be released on November 17, 2028.

== Canceled projects ==
=== Roger Corman film ===
In the mid-1980s, Kevin Eastman and Peter Laird pitched a concept of a live-action film adaptation by Roger Corman for his studio New World Pictures. The film was to have starred Sam Kinison, Gallagher, Bobcat Goldthwait and Billy Crystal in makeup as the turtles.

=== Untitled Teenage Mutant Ninja Turtles III sequel ===
Kevin Eastman was working on a fourth Teenage Mutant Ninja Turtles film between 1995 and 1997 titled TMNT 4: The Next Mutation or TMNT 4: The Foot Walks Again. In 2012, Heritage Auctions published concept arts showing a fifth turtle named Kirby, but also featured are Fang, Shredder, Spyder, Nano Spyder, Super Shredder, Casey, Talbot, Lawson, Bugman and "Evil April". Peter Laird showed some concept art of the Turtles and Splinter on his blog. The main concept behind the film would have the turtles undergo a second mutation due to the mutagen in the heroes' bloodstream beginning to change with age and giving them new abilities and new problems. Also, the film would revolve around the return of the Shredder and proceeded to rebuild the Foot empire.

=== TMNT sequels ===
In 2007 Kevin Munroe stated that he would like to direct a possible sequel to TMNT, possibly involving the return of the Shredder. Munroe planned a trilogy. TMNT 2 would have loosely adapted the Turtles' 13-part comic book saga "City At War". Michelangelo would have felt rejected and joined the Foot Clan, while the Turtles would have traveled to Japan and would have crossed paths with Karai and Shredder. TMNT 3 would have featured the Triceratons as well as the Technodrome's arrival from Dimension X. Munroe wanted Michael Clarke Duncan to voice the Triceraton's leader, Commander Mozar. In an interview, Peter Laird stated that he was interested in the idea of the next film being a hybrid of live-action and CGI, with the Turtles rendered in CGI and Sarah Michelle Gellar and Chris Evans reprising their TMNT roles in live-action.

=== John Fusco-written film ===
In late April 2009, a new live-action film was revealed to be in the works for a 2011 release. Mirage Studios was partnering with producers Scott Mednick and Galen Walker, with Peter Laird, Gary Richardson, Frederick Fierst, Eric Crown as executive producers, and 4Kids Entertainment handling the film's merchandising with Lightbox Productions, LLC. funding the project. The film would have used animatronic suits whose facial expressions would be digitally enhanced in post-production. It was stated that the story would focus on the Turtles origin. A few months later, an open casting call was made for extras to play as members of the Foot Clan with Ernie Reyes Jr. as an acting judge. Peter Laird said "there were a lot of positive feelings about a Batman Begins-style reboot, while producer Galen Walker said the film would be headed in a darker direction. That July, John Fusco was hired as the film's writer. His version was to be inspired by the original dark and gritty black and white comics that Eastman created with Peter Laird, but Paramount was not on board. Kevin Eastman described the script as being "too edgy for what Paramount wanted". Laird revealed the film would have been a direct sequel to the 1990 film while ignoring its earlier sequels. In October, Viacom's subsidiary network Nickelodeon had purchased all of Mirage's rights to the Teenage Mutant Ninja Turtles property for $9.75 million, thus terminating all deals with 4Kids and Time Warner.

=== Teenage Mutant Ninja Turtles: Out of the Shadows sequel ===
A sequel to Out of the Shadows was considered for development prior to the release of the second film. Several actors, such as Noel Fisher, Megan Fox, Tyler Perry, and Pete Ploszek expressed interest to reprise their roles for the third film. Due to the second film's financial failure, development of the third film was canceled.

=== Paramount+ films ===
At the ViacomCBS' Investors Event held in 2022, a number of spin-off films were announced to be in development. Each film is said to center around a villain in the franchise, with the projects being developed by Nickelodeon Animation for streaming exclusively released on Paramount+. No updates on the films have been announced ever since.

=== TMNT: The Last Ronin ===
In 2024, at CinemaCon, Paramount announced an R-rated film adaptation of the comic miniseries Teenage Mutant Ninja Turtles: The Last Ronin. Walter Hamada was hired to produce the film through his 18hz Productions company while Tyler Burton Smith was attached to write the script. In November 2025, it was reported that development on the film was put on hold in favor of another live-action reboot. Ilya Naishuller was in talks to direct prior to this. Judith Hoag was in talks to reprise her role as April O'Neil from the 1990 film.
