= List of Comics Interview interview subjects =

David Anthony Kraft's Comics Interview was an American magazine which ran for 150 issues between 1983 and 1995, and consisted primarily of interviews pertaining to comic books. It was edited and published by David Anthony Kraft.

== Interview subjects (selection) ==
Subjects are listed with the issue number of the interview(s) in parentheses.

- Jack Abel (7)
- Arthur Adams (46)
- Neal Adams (91)
- Dan Adkins (133, 135)
- Brad Anderson (32)
- Brent Anderson (30)
- Murphy Anderson (101)
- John Arcudi (87, 106)
- Roger Armstrong (45)
- Mark Askwith (70, 77)
- Terry Austin (1)
- Dick Ayers (103)
- Sherill & Bruce Ayers (35)
- Chris Bachalo (116)
- Kyle Baker (89)
- Ken Bald (125)
- Alain Baran (59)
- Clive Barker (127)
- Mike Baron (8, 63)
- Mike W. Barr (8)
- Majel Barrett (110, 126)
- Steve Barron (79)
- Susan Barrows (49)
- Dan Barry (81-84)
- Remy Bastien (92-94)
- Paul Beahm (82)
- John Beatty (72)
- Terry Beatty (24)
- Gail Beckett (84)
- Paul Becton (109)
- Dan Berger (83)
- Karen Berger (24)
- Gary Berman (56)
- Alfred Bester (32)
- Tom and Mary Bierbaum (20)
- Al Bigley (139, 140)
- Enki Bilal (100)
- Danny Bilson (88)
- Simon Bisley (99, 101)
- Stephen R. Bissette (32)
- Bill Black (36)
- Brian Bolland (19)
- Ted Boonthanakit (49, 104)
- Joyce Brabner (53)
- Jim Bradrick (66)
- Nathaniel Branden (113)
- Berkeley Breathed (6)
- Brian Murray (134)
- June Brigman (9)
- Gary Brodsky (2)
- Harry Broertjes (108)
- Chester Brown (93)
- Len Brown (115)
- Ryan Brown (83)
- Richard Bruning (45, 46)
- Rick Bryant (34)
- Bob Burden (40, 41)
- Tim Burgard (94)
- Jack Burnley (150)
- Richard Burton (8)
- John Buscema (62)
- Sal Buscema (24)
- Kurt Busiek (141, 142)
- John Byrne (25, 43, 71, 86, 102)
- Bill Campbell (96)
- Ramsey Campbell (22)
- Mike Carlin (135)
- KC Carlson (135)
- John Celardo (80)
- Bill Chadwick (1)
- Paul Chadwick (61)
- Bob Chapman (24)
- Howard Chaykin (3, 75)
- M. Lucie Chin (7)
- Sharon Cho (117)
- Chris Claremont (56, 98, 100)
- John Clark (139)
- Connor Freff Cochran (7)
- Dave Cockrum (20)
- Gene Colan (59, 95-98)
- Hector Collazo (57)
- Katherine Collins (19, 20)
- Max Allan Collins (24)
- Nancy A. Collins (102)
- Ernie Colón (13)
- Joe Colquhoun (17)
- Tom Condon (18)
- Bruce Conklin (28)
- Gerry Conway (13, 75)
- Tom Cook (70)
- John Costanza (5)
- Yvonne Craig (77)
- Meloney Crawford (11)
- Danny Crespi (9)
- Bill Cucinotta (5)
- Robert Culp (7)
- Bess Cutler (142)
- Les Daniels (105)
- Dave Darrigo (39, 40)
- Peter David (30, 94, 101, 105)
- Jon Davidge (128)
- Jack Davis (12)
- John de Lancie (125)
- Paul De Meo (89)
- Mike DeCarlo (7)
- Jerry DeFuccio (120)
- J. M. DeMatteis (38-40)
- Dennis O'Neil (125)
- Buzz Dixon (37)
- Chuck Dixon (57, 93)
- John Dixon (102, 103)
- Michael Dobson (56)
- James Doohan (127)
- Colleen Doran (15)
- Michael Dorn (126)
- Arnold Drake (16)
- Stan Drake (26, 27)
- Gaylord DuBois (17)
- Jo Duffy (27)
- Jerry Dumas (88)
- Kevin Eastman (27)
- Will Eisner (100)
- Glenn Elliott (145)
- Jules Engel (33)
- Steve Englehart (14, 70)
- Marina English (85)
- Byron Erickson (75)
- Mark Evanier (2)
- Vincent Fago (119)
- Jim Feldman (53)
- Miguel Ferrer (44)
- Simon Fields (79)
- Fred Finger (31)
- Danny Fingeroth (143)
- Terry Fitzgerald (133)
- Mike Fleming (29)
- Tom Floyd (41)
- Phil Foglio (7, 23)
- Ron Fontes (144)
- June Foray (54)
- Gardner Fox (9)
- Ramona Fradon (112)
- Frank Frazetta (42)
- Mark Freedman (79, 128)
- Michael Jan Friedman (110)
- Mike Friedrich (6, 115-117)
- Neal Gabler (54)
- Neil Gaiman (103, 116)
- Jim Galton (1)
- José Luis García-López (12)
- Dawn Geiger (67)
- Gary Gerani (115)
- Steve Gerber (1, 37, 38)
- Dave Gibbons (16, 65)
- Michael T. Gilbert (29)
- Jackson Gillis (60)
- Peter B. Gillis (27)
- Dick Giordano (4, 5)
- Gerry Giovinco (5, 51)
- Jean Giraud (45, 64, 75)
- Mike Gold (67, 68)
- Dick Goldwater (3)
- Kurt Goldzung (52)
- Archie Goodwin (36)
- Greg Gorden (26)
- Jerry Grandenetti (17)
- Alan Grant (99, 101)
- Steve Grant (8)
- Steven Grant (72)
- Tom Gray (79)
- Daniel Greenberg (48)
- Mike Grell (69)
- Milton Griepp (43)
- Keith Griffen (1, 20, 66, 99, 133)
- Bill Griffith (8)
- Matt Groening (74)
- Gary Groth (14)
- Mark Gruenwald (54)
- Paul Guinan (52)
- Bob Hall (49)
- Andy Halliday (118)
- Larry Hama (37, 38, 140)
- Mark Hamlin (10)
- Sam Hamm (70)
- Ed Hannigan (80, 160)
- Bob Harras (62)
- Jack C. Harris (135)
- Neil Harris (54)
- Don Heck (100)
- John Heebink (139)
- Andy Helfer (66)
- Fred Hembeck (22)
- Bill "Tex" Henson (150)
- Bobby Herbeck (79)
- Glenn Herdling (140)
- Mike Higgins (29)
- Judith Hoag (79)
- Rick Hoberg (21, 58)
- Dennis Hoerter (126)
- Larry Houston (58, 112)
- Richard Howell (144)
- Adam Hughes (150)
- Bob Hyde (109)
- Jenny Blake Isabella (4)
- Joe Italiano (47)
- Willie Ito (38)
- Ian Jack (14)
- Gary Jackson (120)
- Jaxon (9)
- Ferd Johnson (128-130)
- Josh & Larry Jones (26)
- Kelley Jones (21, 117)
- R.A. Jones (48)
- Matt Jorgensen (21)
- Dan Jurgens (16)
- Carol Kalish (18)
- Jeanne Kalogridis (127)
- Bob Kane (31, 70)
- Gloria Katz (38)
- Yoshiaki Kawajiri (148)
- Mike Kazaleh (131)
- Cam Kennedy (138)
- Bane Kerac (124)
- Margot Kidder (123)
- Sam Kieth (84, 117)
- Jon King (21)
- Jack Kirby (41, 90, 121)
- Roz Kirby (90)
- Todd Klein (3)
- Carl Knappe (41)
- Walter Koenig (110)
- Kazuo Koike (52, 148)
- Goseki Kojima (52, 148)
- June Kostar (4)
- Alex Kotzky (100)
- Roy Krenkel (4)
- John Kricfalusi (131)
- Adam Kubert (140)
- Joe Kubert (9)
- Peter Laird (27, 82)
- Mike Lake (7)
- Nick Landau (7)
- Todd W. Langen (79, 95)
- Bob Larkin (3)
- Erik Larsen (85)
- Batton Lash (79)
- Phil Lasorda (5)
- Jim Lawrence (69)
- Gary Leach (139)
- Jim Lee (63, 98)
- Stan Lee (5, 58, 64, 85)
- Vince Lee (130)
- Steve Leialoha (10)
- Paul Levitz (16)
- Sam Lewis (26)
- Bill Liebowitz (38)
- Rob Liefeld (90, 119)
- Michael Lindsay (148)
- Scott Lobdell (137)
- Jeph Loeb (99, 123)
- Jean-Marc Lofficier (45)
- Steven Long (99)
- Ken Lopez (58)
- Glenn Lumsden (108)
- Marco Lupoi (60)
- Tom Lyle (93)
- Mark Macaluso (149)
- Carl Macek (23)
- Howard Mackie (92)
- Steve MacManus (58)
- Jeff MacNelly (46)
- Anson Maddocks (145)
- Dan Madsen (126)
- Adam Malin (56)
- Dennis Mallonee (64, 112)
- Ron Mann (70)
- T. M. Maple (24)
- Larry Marder (141, 142)
- Peter Maris (136)
- Barbara Marker (47)
- Bill Marks (40)
- Don Markstein (135)
- Bill Martin (149)
- Christy Marx (10)
- Val Mayerik (15)
- Rick Mays (140)
- David Mazzucchelli (115, 117)
- Scott McCloud (18, 19)
- Todd McFarlane (81, 119, 129, 134)
- Don McGregor (144-147)
- Alan McKenzie (58)
- Angus McKie (30)
- Darrell McNeil (47)
- George McWhorter (109-110)
- Colm Meaney (118)
- Tony Meininger (126)
- Ben Melnicker (77)
- Lou Ann Merkle (53)
- William Messner-Loebs (73)
- Bernd Metz (35)
- Will Meugniot (2, 112)
- Jean-Claude Mézières (77)
- Harold Michaelson (89)
- Frank Miller (2, 31, 43, 52, 82, 113, 129)
- Pat Mills (36)
- Bernie Mireault (83)
- Ken Mitchroney (84)
- Doug Moench (10, 11)
- Sheldon Moldoff (127)
- Jim Mooney (103)
- Alan Moore (12, 48, 65)
- John Francis Moore (123)
- Gray Morrow (139)
- Dean Motter (39, 70, 77)
- Dean Mullaney (9)
- Jan Mullaney (9)
- Bill Mumy (44)
- John Cullen Murphy (109)
- Stephen Murphy (83, 84)
- Doug Murray (53)
- Will Murray (90)
- Andy Mushynsky (22)
- Paul Neary (119)
- Mark Nelson (68)
- Ted Newsom (85)
- Kelly Nichols (13)
- Fabian Nicieza (96)
- Ann Nocenti (39)
- Martin Nodell (149)
- Floyd Norman (44)
- Rick Norwood (90)
- Jim Novak (1)
- Dennis O'Neil (35)
- Bill Oakley (54)
- Koichi Ohata (148)
- Steve Oliff (1)
- Rick Oliver (52)
- George Olshevsky (15)
- Joe Orsak (56)
- Tom Orzechowski (11, 12)
- John Ostrander (15)
- Pander Brothers (51)
- Jason Parizanski (104)
- Rick Parker (33, 133)
- Martin Pasko (34)
- Bruce Patterson (28)
- Geraldine Pecht (51)
- Gene Pelc (3)
- Willie Peppers (55)
- George Pérez (6, 50, 94, 104)
- Jerry Perles (43)
- Jim Pertierra (86)
- Stefan Petrucha (142, 147)
- Tom Peyer (56)
- Chuck Pfarrer (106)
- Robert Picardo (141)
- Tad Pietrzykowski (106)
- Bob Pinaha (9)
- Richard Pini (15, 60)
- Wendy Pini (73)
- Wendy and Richard Pini (5, 6, 87)
- Mike Ploog (148)
- Sandy Plunkett (17)
- Carl Potts (63)
- Paul Power (33, 312)
- Doug Pratt (86)
- John Prentice (85, 86)
- David Prowse (138)
- Rodney Ramos (92)
- Ron Randall (67)
- Dominique Rasquain (73)
- Barb Rausch (45, 46)
- Warren Reece (8)
- Rod Reed (18)
- Todd Reis (41, 78)
- Mick Richardson (61)
- Steve Riggenberg (42)
- Jerry Robinson (31, 56-58)
- Fred Rogers (12)
- John Romita Jr. (11, 89)
- Don Rosa (13)
- Hank Rose (48)
- Joe Rosen (7)
- Alex Ross (143)
- David Ross (39, 40)
- George Roussos (2, 31)
- Jeff Rovin (131, 132)
- Adrienne Roy (9)
- Mike Royer (121, 122)
- Bob Rozakis (45, 46)
- Josef Rubinstein (36, 37)
- Steve Rude (78, 121)
- Pamela Rutt (55)
- Mike Saenz (21)
- Steve Saffel (55)
- Stan Sakai (44)
- Tim Sale (99)
- Jim Salicrup (115)
- Tony Salmons (121)
- Doug Sanford (16)
- Steve Schanes (55)
- Steves Schanes (54)
- Bill Schelly (146)
- Bob Schreck (51)
- Willie Schubert (52)
- Diana Schultz (51)
- Charles M. Schulz (47)
- Alvin Schwartz (124)
- Julius Schwartz (88)
- Rhyan Scorpio-Rhys (134)
- David Scroggy (11)
- Ken Selig (44)
- Val Semeiks (101)
- Fulvia Serra (88)
- Anthea Shackleton (69)
- Bob Sharen (6)
- Mitch Sheele (149)
- Jim Shepherd (146)
- Jim Shooter (14)
- Steve Sibra (74)
- Bill Sienkiewicz (34, 53)
- Marc Silvestri (76, 90)
- Dave Sim (107)
- Gene Simmons (2, 81)
- Louise Simonson (12, 39)
- Walt Simonson (9, 39, 111)
- David M. Singer (20)
- Melissa Ann Singer (7)
- Jake Sisko (118)
- Roger Slifer (8)
- Dan Slott (122)
- Beau Smith (23)
- Bruce Smith (112)
- Jeff Smith (133)
- Tod Smith (7)
- Thierry Smolderen (75)
- Art Spiegelman (108)
- Dan Spiegle (150)
- Dick Sprang (70)
- Greg Stafford (57)
- Linda Stanley (59)
- Jim Starlin (4, 90)
- Flo Steinberg (17)
- Brian Stelfreeze (114, 148)
- Roger Stern (120)
- Dave Stevens (97)
- Chic Stone (121)
- Karl Story (87)
- William Stout (74-76, 121)
- Randy Stradley (61, 87)
- Wesley Strick (111)
- Jan Strnad (30)
- Larry Stroman (105)
- Tom Sutton (80)
- Arthur Suydam (18)
- Marc Swayze (122)
- George Takei (126)
- Lyle Talbot (125)
- Paul Tallerday (47)
- Kevin Taylor (123)
- Mike Teitelbaum (1)
- Ty Templeton (66)
- Greg Theakston (20)
- Joel Thingval (75)
- Ed Thomas (6)
- Roy Thomas (6, 66-68)
- Kim Thompson (14)
- Don & Maggie Thompson (19)
- Steven P. Thompson (105)
- Dan Thorsland (130)
- Kathy Todd (150)
- Anthony Tollin (10)
- Timothy Truman (15)
- Ron Turner (43)
- Michael E. Uslan (77)
- Jim Valentino (90, 119)
- William Van Horn (77)
- Craig Van Sickle (99)
- Kevin VanHook (124)
- Wayne Vansant (53)
- Tom Veitch (138)
- Mark Verheiden (68, 87, 136)
- Charles Vess (95, 96)
- Henry Vogel (35, 55, 112)
- Neil Vokes (23)
- Mike Vosburg (90)
- David de Vries (108)
- Martin Wagner (86)
- Matt Wagner (14, 83)
- Mark Waid (118)
- Alex Wald (52)
- Lamar Waldron (49)
- Reed Waller (59)
- Burt Ward (31)
- Chris Warner (63)
- David Weaver (13)
- Len Wein (92)
- Howard Weinstein (110)
- Matthew Weisman (123)
- Alan Weiss (33, 34)
- Rick Werft (46)
- Doug Wheeler (134)
- Geroge White (114)
- Mike Wieringo (137)
- Doug Wildey (148, 149)
- Lynn Williams (47)
- Van Williams (124)
- Al Williamson (62)
- Bill Willingham (17)
- Ray Winninger (48)
- Bill Woggon (45, 46)
- Marv Wolfman (3, 74)
- Bob Woods (138)
- Bill Woolfolk (28, 29)
- John Workman (6)
- Kate Worley (59)
- William Wray (122)
- Boaz Yakin (76)
- Andy Yanchus (4)
- Thomas Yeates (22)
- Catherine Yronwode (23)
- Bryce Zabel (132)
- Leslie Zahler (19)
- Mike Zeck (72)
- Phil Zimelman (72)
- D. Jon Zimmerman (3, 9)
- Howard Zimmerman (76)
- Tom Ziuko (8)

== See also ==
- List of Comics Journal interview subjects
