= Teenage Mutant Ninja Turtles: Turtles in Time Re-Shelled =

2009 beat 'em up video game

- Developer: Ubisoft Singapore (Note: Original game developed by Konami)
- Publisher: Ubisoft
- Designer: May Ling Tan
- Programmer: Benedict Yeoh
- Artist: Audran Guerard
- Composers: Sylvain C. Grant; Dominique C. Grant
- Series: Teenage Mutant Ninja Turtles
- Platforms: Xbox 360, PlayStation 3
- Release: Xbox 360: WW: August 5, 2009; PlayStation 3: WW: September 10, 2009
- Genre: Beat 'em up
- Modes: Single-player, multiplayer

Teenage Mutant Ninja Turtles: Turtles in Time Re-Shelled is a 2009 beat 'em up game developed and published by Ubisoft. It is an enhanced remake of Konami's 1991 arcade game, Teenage Mutant Ninja Turtles: Turtles in Time. It is mostly based on the 1987 animated series, the Teenage Mutant Ninja Turtles Adventures and the second movie, like the original game.

It was developed and published by Ubisoft Singapore for the PlayStation 3 and Xbox 360. It was released worldwide on August 5, 2009, on Xbox Live Arcade and September 10, 2009, on the PlayStation Network. The game was later delisted from the Xbox Live Marketplace and the PlayStation Store in June 2011, due to an expired license.

The game was a commercial success, moving more than 444,000 units during its time on Xbox Live Arcade. It also was the top downloadable title on the North American PlayStation Network the month of its release. Despite high sales, critical reception was mediocre overall. The PlayStation 3 version holds a score of 56.50% at GameRankings, while the Xbox 360 version holds a score of 61.79%. Reviewers generally praised the enhanced visuals and addition of online play, but were critical of the little replay value and the inability to join a game already in progress.

== Gameplay ==
Turtles in Time Re-Shelled is an enhanced remake of the original Turtles in Time.

Turtles in Time Re-Shelled is a side scrolling beat 'em up. Players control the Teenage Mutant Ninja Turtles: Donatello, Leonardo, Michaelangelo, and Raphael. Each playable character has his own strengths and weaknesses. Up to four players can play simultaneously, and can play any combination of local and online multiplayer. Players are given a basic control setup, with jump, attack, and special attack buttons in addition to movement. Certain button combinations can execute special moves, such as a sprint, dash attack, or special attack. New to the remake is the ability to attack in eight directions, as opposed to the two directions of the original version.

Other enhancements were made to Re-Shelled over the original game. The graphics were recreated completely in 3D, with players now moving in and out of a true 3D camera. The opening and closing cinematics were redesigned with a stylized comic book feel. The vocal quips of the arcade version return, albeit re-recorded by the cast of the 2003 cartoon. The original music, including the original theme song, has been replaced with new compositions. Re-Shelled also features Survival and Quickplay modes as well as leaderboards which track a player's high score. However, the game does not feature any of the original levels that were featured in the SNES version of the original game.

== Synopsis ==
The game begins as the turtles watch a television newscast of April O'Neil reporting from Liberty Island. Suddenly, Krang flies in using his giant exosuit and steals the Statue of Liberty. Immediately thereafter Shredder hijacks the airwaves to laugh at the turtles. They head to downtown New York and pursue the Foot Clan through the streets and the city sewers, where Shredder sends them through a time warp. The turtles then have to fight Shredder's army through multiple eras of time to defeat him.

== Development and marketing ==
Turtles in Time Re-Shelled was first unveiled in April 2009 at the Galabunga event in New York City. Originally slated for release on the Xbox 360 on July 22, 2009, it was first released as a timed exclusive for the Xbox 360 on August 5, 2009, as part of the Xbox Live Summer of Arcade. The price of Re-Shelled was lowered prior to the game's release. When questioned as to the reason for the price drop, a Ubisoft representative responded "We wanted to give something to the loyal TMNT fans in honor of the 25th anniversary." It was released on PlayStation 3 following the time exclusivity on September 10, 2009. The game was later delisted from the Xbox Live Marketplace and the PlayStation Store in June 2011, due to an expired license.

== Reception ==
Reception

Aggregate scores
Aggregator	Score
GameRankings	56.50% (PS3); 61.79% (X360)
Metacritic	55/100 (PS3); 60/100 (X360)

Review scores
Publication	Score
1Up.com	C
GameZone	7/10
IGN	5.9/10
TeamXbox	8.8/10

Turtles in Time Re-Shelled received mixed reviews from critics, but mediocre reception overall. The PlayStation 3 version holds a score of 56.50% at GameRankings, while the Xbox 360 version holds a score of 61.79%. Metacritic reports similar scores, with the PlayStation 3 version averaging 55/100 and the Xbox 360 version averaging 60/100. Despite mediocre reviews it was a commercial success, moving more than 387,000 units on Xbox Live Arcade as of year-end 2010. It also ranked as the top downloadable title on the North American PlayStation Network the month of its release. As of its delisting on Xbox Live Arcade it had moved 444,000 units.

Reviewers generally had positive remarks in regards to the upgraded graphics in the game. Dale Nardozzi of TeamXbox stated the visual upgrade has "a fancy sheen that completely modernizes this code." IGN's Daemon Hatfield also praised the new visuals, but expressed dissatisfaction with the fact that players could not choose the original graphics, saying that "the original arcade graphics have a certain charm this version doesn't." Official Xbox Magazine (OXM)'s Ryan McCaffrey agreed, noting "we would’ve loved a Secret of Monkey Island/R-Type-esque way to revert to the classic graphics on the fly." In regards to the game's multiplayer, reviewers appreciated the new online component; however, some were disappointed with the inability to join games on the fly, which the original arcade version allowed. Scott Sharkey of 1UP.com and the reviewer from GameZone both noted that the game is more fun with four players. Sharkey stated that multiplayer gameplay "amplifies the fun by an order of magnitude for each person who joins in."

Criticisms were made in regards to the game's simplicity and lack of replay value. The reviewer from GameTrailers was disappointed with the control scheme, stating it was too simplistic. TeamXbox's Dale Nardozzi stated that while the turtles can now attack in more directions players will still "more than likely get a severe, gang-up-style beatdown." IGN's Daemon Hatfield criticized the game's difficulty, but conceded that Turtles in Time "was made for arcades and it shows in the cheap bosses and unavoidable traps."
