= Leonardo (Teenage Mutant Ninja Turtles) =

Fictional mutant

- Teenage Mutant Ninja Turtles character
- Textless Planet Awesome exclusive cover variant of Teenage Mutant Ninja Turtles #99. Art by series co-creator Kevin Eastman
- First appearance: Teenage Mutant Ninja Turtles #1 (May 1984)
- Created by: Kevin Eastman; Peter Laird
- Portrayed by: Mainline: David Forman (1990 film); Mark Caso (1991 and 1993 films); Gabe Khouth (Ninja Turtles: The Next Mutation); Pete Ploszek (2014 and 2016 films)
- Voiced by: Mainline: Cam Clarke (1987 series, Operation Blue Line, 2012 series crossover episodes, 2014 film tie-in games, Nickelodeon All-Star Brawl, Shredder's Revenge, Nickelodeon Kart Racers 3: Slime Speedway); Brian Tochi (1990, 1991, and 1993 films); Michael Dobson (The Next Mutation); Michael Sinterniklaas (2003 series, Turtles in Time Re-Shelled, Smash-Up, and Turtles Forever); James Arnold Taylor (2007 film and video game); Jason Biggs (2012 series Seasons 1-2); Johnny Knoxville (2014 film); Dominic Catrambone (Danger of the Ooze, 2012 series Season 2, Splintered Fate); Seth Green (2012 series Seasons 3-5, Half-Shell Heroes: Blast to the Past, Portal Power); Ben Schwartz (Rise of the Teenage Mutant Ninja Turtles series and film); Nicolas Cantu (Mutant Mayhem, 2024 series); Others: Dan Green ('87 counterpart in Turtles Forever); Jason Griffith (Mirage counterpart in Turtles Forever); Scott Whyte (2013 video game); Nolan North (Mutants in Manhattan); Eric Bauza (Turtles Take Time (and Space), DC crossover film)

In-universe information
- Species: Mutant turtle
- Affiliation: Teenage Mutant Ninja Turtles
- Weapon: Dual katana
- Family: Master Splinter (adoptive father); Raphael, Donatello and Michelangelo (brothers)
- Home: Sewers of New York, United States
- Abilities: Mastery of ninjutsu, kobudō, chi gong, stealth and various hand-to-hand combat disciplines; Superhuman agility, speed, and strength; Master ōdachi, katana and ninjatō swordsman; Mastery of kenjutsu and iaidō; Keen strategist; Healing abilities (2012 series; via "the healing hands"); Use in archery and shuriken throwing; Teleportation and Portal Generation (Rise of the TMNT)

Leonardo, commonly nicknamed Leo, is a superhero appearing in Teenage Mutant Ninja Turtles comics and related media, and created by American comic book artists Kevin Eastman and Peter Laird. He is one of the main characters of the franchise, along with his brothers, Donatello, Raphael and Michelangelo. Leonardo is commonly depicted as the leader and strategist of the turtles.

Often shown wearing an ocean blue bandana, his signature weapons are a pair of swords (named katanas in many versions of the series). He is traditionally portrayed as the most mature and disciplined of the Turtles, displaying a stoic demeanor and a strong sense of responsibility. Like his brothers, he is named after an Italian Renaissance artist, in this case Leonardo da Vinci. In the original comics, all four of the Turtles wear red masks, but for the creators to tell them apart, he was written and redrawn to have an ocean-blue mask.

== Comics ==
=== Mirage ===
Leo is the protagonist of the comics. He does not explicitly refer to himself as a leader in the early stories, except in issue #44 ("The Violent Underground"). He is the one to usually take charge of the turtles when Splinter is not present. He is often at odds with his more hot-headed brother Raphael.

In Leonardo #1 (What Goes Around... ...Comes Around!), Leo goes out for a run on the rooftops of New York City and is ambushed by the Foot Clan. He puts up a fight against an army of Foot Ninja but is overwhelmed. Beaten to near unconsciousness, he is thrown through April O'Neil's apartment window. The remaining Turtles and Splinter are forced to continue the fight, but even with the aid of Casey Jones, the odds are against them. In the end, the building catches fire and the police arrive, but they secretly escape to Northampton, Massachusetts. Leonardo recovers from his physical wounds, but he lost his confidence. He repeatedly attempts unsuccessfully to hunt for deer. While out hunting, he sees April fall through ice into a lake, and he rescues her. In subsequent issues, it is implied that Leonardo has regained most of his confidence.

In the Return to New York storyline (Teenage Mutant Ninja Turtles (vol. 1) #19-21), Raphael demands that the Turtles return to New York to confront the Foot Clan and Shredder. He accuses Leonardo of cowardice, and the arguing brothers fight. Leonardo is beaten by Raphael, who throws Leonardo through the wall of the barn and leaves. Along with his younger brother Donatello and his youngest brother Michelangelo, Leonardo returns to New York and reunites with his wayward brother in the old sewer lair. The three go along with Raphael's plan to storm the Foot Headquarters, where once again Raphael goes off on his own to fight Shredder. He is ambushed and beaten by Shredder's Elite guard but is rescued by Leonardo. This prompts Raphael to cede to Leonardo's leadership, leaving him to fight Shredder. Leonardo engages in a bloody battle with Shredder that ends up on the rooftop of the building. Leonardo ends the battle by decapitating Shredder just as the building implodes. The Turtles later burn Shredder's corpse on a funeral pyre in a nearby Manhattan harbor.

Leonardo captured by Karai on the cover of issue #57 (art by A. C. Farley)

In the City at War storyline (Teenage Mutant Ninja Turtles (vol. 1) #50-62), a feud between various factions of the Foot Clan over leadership breaks out. As fighting ensues in the streets of New York, the Turtles and the civilian populace get caught in the middle. Leonardo grows weary of constant battle with the Foot Clan and seems fraught with indecision. The Turtles are approached by Karai, the leader of the Foot Clan in Japan who has come to New York to unite the Foot. She presents the Turtles with an offer of a truce between the Foot and the Turtles if they help her kill Shredder's Elite Guards, which are a major obstacle to her reorganizing the Foot. Despite Raphael's objections, Leonardo persuades his brothers to accept Karai's offer and all four Turtles successfully work with Karai to eliminate the Elite Guard.

In Volume 2 of the Mirage Studios comic, the turtles begin living in separate places. Leonardo decides to live in a newfound sewer lair. Michelangelo and Raphael notice a change in Leonardo and note that he seems more easygoing, though Raphael points out that his and Leonardo's natural order is to be "buttin' heads."

Years later in Volume 4, Leonardo still leads his brothers (all four now in their thirties) in fights against crime. Leonardo and Raphael's conflict seems to have lessened. When the Utroms arrive on Earth and reveal alien life to humans the Turtles become free to mingle in everyday society. The Turtles help the Utroms acclimate to life on Earth and work alongside the Foot Clan as security. One Foot Clan member is Cha Ocho, who Leonardo has a rivalry with due to an encounter years earlier. Karai approaches Leonardo for help when a mysterious force begins attacking various Foot Clans; only the New York branch is left intact. His investigation takes him to the Battle Nexus, where he meets Oroku Yoshi (who wears armor similar to Shredder's).

This incarnation of Leonardo makes an appearance in the Turtles Forever crossover special voiced by Jason Griffith.

=== Image Comics ===
In Volume 3 of the Image Comics series, Leonardo was initially portrayed as similar to his Mirage counterpart (at the time, Image was picking up where Volume 2 left off). In the later issues, he lost a hand when it was eaten by King Komodo, although this did not seem to deter him. He tried to use a prosthetic hand, which was given to him by Donatello, but he preferred to wear a steel cap which came with a retractable blade. In the IDW-published conclusion, TMNT Urban Legends 25, after an altercation with Lady Shredder which smashed his steel cap beyond use, Leonardo's hand was found to have grown back.

=== Archie Comics ===
The Archie Comics series initially began as an adaptation of the 1987 animated series, so Leonardo was portrayed like his animated counterpart. As the series progressed, it began telling original stories. Leonardo demonstrated a dislike for firearms. A future version of Leonardo was depicted, having founded a ninja school. Four of his top students were depicted: Nobuko, possibly his love interest; Miles, a young black man; Carmen, a Latina woman and possibly his love interest; and Bob, an anthropomorphic baboon. These students seemed to have an "extended family" relationship with the Turtles, Bob, in particular, referring to them as uncles.

=== IDW Comics ===
Although the IDW series is a re-imagination of the franchise, Leonardo is initially portrayed as similar to his Mirage counterpart. Leonardo is the eldest brother and the leader of the four. In the Cityfall saga, he gets captured by the Foot while he and his brothers try to save Casey and is taken to a Shinto witch by the name of Kitsune, who uses her dark magic to brainwash him into working for Shredder as his chunin (second-in-command), which infuriates Karai. He is saved by his brothers and their allies, however, after the death of Shredder at the hands of his father, Splinter, who took over the Foot Clan after the battle, Leo once again became the chunin, but, like last time, it did not last. The relationship between Splinter and his sons deteriorated after he decided to take another life, going against the philosophy he taught them to always follow. He revealed that this was, in fact, an intentional way of pushing them away from him, as he believes being around him would be too much of a threat to them, as shown during the events of the comic book. Leonardo assumed leadership over the Clan Hamato, and since then, they have come into conflict with the Foot Clan several times.

== Television ==
=== 1987 animated series ===
In the lyrics for the 1987 TV series' theme song, Leonardo is stated to be the leader of the turtles; his orders are usually followed, and he is a serious do-gooder who does not joke around. He was attracted to a young kunoichi named Lotus, a swordswoman prodigy from Japan who was hired by Krang to replace Shredder, whom she defeated (along with Bebop and Rocksteady). She and Leonardo dueled to a standstill before she resorted to a trick sword to knock him out. When they met the second time, she tried to convince him to join her as a "ninja for hire", but he refused. She turned on Krang and escaped to continue her mercenary lifestyle, telling Leonardo that there was little good in goodness, though she hoped that they would one day be on the same side.

Leonardo takes his role of being a leader seriously. He can be bossy which annoys his brothers. Mostly they will obey, but sometimes they will not. In a Season 4 episode "Leonardo lightens up", his brothers got so annoyed that they used a personality alternator to make him loosen up, which lead to huge problems but ended up going back to normal in the end.

At the start of the series he is shown with having a level head, akin to his leadership qualities in the comic. However, as the series carried on, he became more of a hero of a group of superheroes and spoke in a high pitched voice, which was very different from the original, deeper pitch in the first season.

In the Season 3 episode "Take Me to Your Leader!", Leonardo gives up his leadership and walks away after a dream he believes convinces him he is no longer a good leader. The others have to find him, and stop Shredder, Krang, and Bebop and Rocksteady from draining energy from the Sun with a Solar Siphon and store it in solar batteries. However, Leonardo returns when he spots a bridge collapsing due to snow. After a man says that everybody talks about the weather but nobody does anything, Leonardo realizes his responsibility and begins to search for his brothers. He later finds them, and together they save the Earth.

Leonardo's voice actor was Cam Clarke. In the crossover film Turtles Forever, this version of Leonardo is voiced by Dan Green. Leonardo made a couple of appearances in the 2012 series in the episode, "The Manhattan Project". He and the other turtles along with Casey and April are seen through a portal by their 2012 counterparts walking on a road and he made a speaking cameo along with the other turtles at the end of the episode when a space worm from the 2012 dimension started terrorizing the street. All four turtles see the worm and spring into action while shouting their famous catchphrase, 'Cowabunga'. Clarke reprised his role as Leonardo for the cameo. This would mark the first time in over 28 years the 1987 TMNT cast would return to their roles, with the sole exception of Rob Paulsen who returned to the TMNT franchise as Donatello in the 2012 series. The 1987 turtles then had a crossover with the 2012 turtles in the season 4 episode, "Trans-Dimensional Turtles" then in the three-part series finale "Wanted: Bebop & Rocksteady".

=== Coming Out of Their Shells tour ===
The live-action "Coming Out of Their Shells" concert tour kickoff event at Radio City Music Hall would see Leonardo cast as the band's bass player, taking a secondary role while Michelangelo would take the role of lead singer and guitarist. However, once the Turtles are confronted by Shredder and his forces during portions of the show, Leonardo again takes his role as the Turtles' battlefield commander, as they begin to defer to his orders during the various fight scenes in the show. Cam Clarke reprises his role as the voice of Leonardo in the speaking segments for the concert between songs though he is not credited on the video release or on the Making Of VHS tape.

=== 1997 live-action series ===
From 1997 to 1998, Leonardo along with the other Ninja Turtles was featured in a short-lived live-action series Ninja Turtles: The Next Mutation, as well as a crossover episode with Power Rangers in Space. In it, he carried one double-bladed ninjaken instead of two and his sibling rivalry with Raphael drove many episodes. In one episode where they were sparring, Raphael took advantage of Leo's apparent physical weakening, insulting, mocking and taunting his brother to make him more reckless, until finally, Leo lost his temper and angrily kicked Raph so hard that he sent Raph flying across the sewer den. They spent the rest of the episode arguing and challenging each other to tests of skill (some of them quite absurd) until finally using arm wrestling to decide who would live in the sewer and who would leave. Although Leo won, it was decided that Raph should stay. In this series, Leonardo was portrayed by Gabe Khouth and voiced by Michael Dobson.

=== 2003 animated series ===
In the Mirage Studios and 4Kids Entertainment 2003 animated TV series, Leonardo is voiced by Michael Sinterniklaas.

Leonardo is the eldest brother, and leader of the group, quiet and the most serious of the four. He has a very close bond with Splinter, and has a strong sense of honor, ethics, and bushido. Leonardo's twin swords are slung across his back. Episodes that deal with Shredder and honor usually also focus on Leonardo, and he is often the Turtle who "saves the day". Leonardo is a more self-doubting character than in previous incarnations. His brother Raphael often quarrels with him and resents his leadership, sarcastically calling Leonardo "Fearless Leader", although the two are shown to be very close at times. Though Leonardo's relationships with his younger brothers Donatello and Michelangelo are not as volatile, both have made comments alluding to the high standards the former has set, and his tendency to make them look bad. Despite this, his brothers view him as a pillar of strength and are at a loss when he is injured or absent. One of Leonardo's most prominent qualities is his determination to believe in the good and the best in people, even potential enemies; such as Karai.

At times, Leonardo is shown to be very hard on himself, as he feels that a lot is expected of him. As in the Mirage comics, Leonardo is ambushed and seriously injured by the Foot Clan and he feels he let his family and himself down. He has the same feelings after the final battle with Shredder-his anger and self-doubt were caused by Karai, who he believed was an honorable ally, but she was unable to go against her master's orders, eventually causing her to stab Leonardo (albeit unintentionally). Leonardo also feels extremely inadequate, as he believes that again, he let himself and his family down, this time by finding no other way to destroy Shredder than to blow up the spaceship that both the Turtles and Shredder were on; the Turtles and Splinter would have perished if they had not been rescued by Utroms. Because of what happen in the last battle against Shredder, Leo becomes bitter and increasingly stern with himself and adopts a greatly aggressive personality, which has been likened to Raph's previous impulsive and hotheaded ways on many occasions. Leonardo also shows considerably less reluctance in using violence to interrogate people, and devotes himself to even greater lengths of training in order to protect his family.

Not wanting to worry his family, Leonardo decided to not tell them about his true feelings about their final battle against Shredder, although he open up to April and Usagi about his problems. However, Leonardo ended up making his family concern for him anyway and they didn't like his attitude. Eventually, Leonardo finds inner peace under the guidance of the Ancient One, who trained Splinter's sensei, Hamato Yoshi. From their final battle with Shredder, Leonardo was the only Turtle to sustain truly lasting damage; part of the shell on his upper left shoulder had its edge shorn. Nevertheless, he is the most skilled of the Turtles, being the only one trained by two ninja masters, capable of facing and defeating Karai, the new Shredder, in a one-on-one fight, as well as defeating all three of his brothers at once in a sparring match.

In the fifth season, of the eight acolytes under the Tribunal's training, Leonardo is the only one who does not receive a weapon from the Spirit Forge. It is implied that his spirit is his weapon, and anything he holds is merely an extension. His otherworldly form is that of a dragon, a rare form, unheard of in someone his age. It is shown destroying evil guarding the second artifact. This avatar is first shown in "More Worlds Than One". His brothers later exhibit dragon avatars as well. In the fifth episode "Beginning of the End", he is given the sword "Gunjin" (one of the Fangs of the Dragon that commands the "White Flame of the Dragon King") by the wounded Faraji, who believes the sword was meant to be Leo's. Leo returns Gunjin in episode 12 "Enter the Dragons" when Faraji returns to help battle the Tengu Shredder because he believes the sword truly belongs to Faraji.

In the Fast Forward season and the Back to the Sewers season, the damage to Leonardo's shell was repaired.

Leonardo is trained not just by Master Splinter but the Ancient One himself, Hamato Yoshi's trainer and adoptive father. From then on, Leonardo is far more experienced and skillful at even more complex ninjitsu moves than even Splinter, Raph, Mikey, and Donnie all at once. In the third part of the first season episode series "Return to New York", he cuts Shredder's head off in a one-on one-duel in Shredder's domain.

Leonardo is the most skilled at ninjutsu and other forms of hand-to-hand combat he all learned from his adopted father and master, Splinter. As his weapons are dual katanas, he is proficient in "the ways of the sword" and basic knife-throwing techniques. If need be, he can use Qi Qong to slow his own bodily functions to survive temporarily without oxygen. After training sessions with "the Ancient One" he developed an intuitive/psionic-like ability to see what has previously transpired by "allowing thought to flow out and within."

=== 2012 animated series ===
Leonardo, as depicted in the 2012 Nickelodeon series

Leonardo again leads the team in Nickelodeon's animated series. In this latest version, Leonardo seems to be less experienced and still perfecting his fighting skills and leadership abilities to make more solid decisions and gain more trust from his three brothers. He regularly watches an animated science fiction show called Space Heroes (a parody of Star Trek: The Animated Series) and uses it as a guide for his leadership skills, often attempting to quote from the show in an attempt to sound intimidating and heroic, even if most of his attempts fall flat due to him sounding too cliché.

Leonardo's weapons here are purely dual katanas, which he uses in the Niten Ryu style of kenjutsu, making him an excellent swordsman. Despite the fact the other three turtles have added traits in this series, Leonardo is almost completely normal but now has blue eyes. Upon the sudden demise of his adopted father and master, he reluctantly steps up as sensei in addition to being the leader, which puts even more pressure on him. He is visited, on occasion, by the spirit of Splinter who encourages him to lead his family and friends to stop new evils.

In addition to his natural ninjitsu skills, he eventually developed the strong innate ability to heal via an enchanted mantra known as "the healing hands". By chanting the incantation and making the right hand seals, Leo is fully capable of revitalizing his inner strength and counteracting even the most lethal of poisons and venom of "the healing hands". He managed to develop and utilize it to counteract the lethal venom of Karai, and attempted to use it on her to release her from Shredder's control but failed. He then succeeded in saving Casey and Michelangelo from death. According to Splinter, he shows great gifts as a healer, and that being at the edge of his life had given him "a power that few martial artists can tap."

The character was voiced by actor Jason Biggs up until "The Wrath of Tiger Claw". Biggs then departed the series and was replaced by Dominic Catrambone for the remainder of the second season; Seth Green then took on the role for the remainder of the series, this change in voice was explained in the series as a throat injury sustained in the season 2 finale.

=== Rise of the Teenage Mutant Ninja Turtles ===
Leonardo as depicted in Rise of the Teenage Mutant Ninja Turtles: The Movie

In the 2018 animated series, Rise of the Teenage Mutant Ninja Turtles, "Leonardo, the self-professed "coolest" brother possesses irreverent charm and a rebel heart". Unlike past versions, he is not the official leader of the turtles until the second season finale, and boasts a less serious, more laidback, charming, sardonic, and joke-cracking personality. This incarnation of Leo is the second born brother, with Raphael being the oldest. Despite his apparent immaturity and goofiness, Leo is quick-witted and strategic by nature. He initiatively leads his brothers whenever something has happened to Raphael, who is the group's de facto leader throughout the first two seasons. Despite coming off as somewhat arrogant, he also demonstrates insecurity and self-doubt. At the end of the season 2 finale "Rise", Splinter appoints Leo the new leader of his sons, much to the shock of him and his brothers. He is voiced by Ben Schwartz.

In Rise of the Teenage Mutant Ninja Turtles: The Movie, Leo ends up doing more harm than good when his ego leads to the alien Krang invading Earth and Raphael being captured. Over the course of the film Leo becomes more adept at fulfilling the role of leader. He sacrifices himself by trapping both himself and the Krang in the prison dimension to save the world (and possibly to make-up for all the harm he's done), being content knowing that his family was safe from a future where the Krang decimate the planet. He is saved from the prison dimension at the end of the film thanks to Mikey's new mystic powers and Leo reconciles with Raphael.

=== Tales of the TMNT (2024) ===
Leo appears in Tales of the Teenage Mutant Ninja Turtles, a follow-up 2D-animated series sequel to TMNT: Mutant Mayhem, with Nicolas Cantu reprising his role from the latter film.

== Films ==
=== Original trilogy ===
In Teenage Mutant Ninja Turtles, Leonardo was fairly modest and sensitive, rarely issuing direct commands and seemingly much more relaxed around his brothers thinking of himself as more of an equal than a leader. It was he who first communicated telepathically with a kidnapped Splinter and seems the most anxious about Raphael's health after his ambush by the Foot Clan. He fought alongside his brothers against Shredder in the climactic battle and was the only one of the four to actually injure Shredder, but, like his brothers, could not defeat him. Due to the focus on Raphael in the film's plot, Leonardo's personality was rarely explored and his leadership position in the team took a back seat. Leonardo was portrayed by David Forman and voiced by Brian Tochi.

In The Secret of the Ooze, Leonardo was much more prominent and his leadership position was brought to focus. He is seen on many occasions bickering with Raphael as their sibling rivalry begins to become much more serious. He, like his brothers, was astonished at the return of the Foot but he found that their current homelessness due to their last battle was a more pressing issue and soon he convinced his brothers that they needed to move. Leonardo is once again sensitive, caring, and humorous in this adaption but he now appears much bossier and controlling. This time, Leonardo was portrayed by Mark Caso and once again voiced by Brian Tochi.

In Teenage Mutant Ninja Turtles III, after traveling back in time to feudal Japan, Leonardo leads his brothers to help a village in trouble from the villainous weapons trader, Walker, and to return home. In the last of the original film's trilogy, Leonardo was once again portrayed by Mark Caso and voiced by Brian Tochi.

=== 2007 film ===
In TMNT, Leo was sent away by Master Splinter to hone his skills in becoming a more efficient leader after Shredder's defeat. April finds him in Central America and while he was hesitant to return to New York City, he does at the right time to take on a new force of evil.

His brotherly relationship with Raphael is strained due to Raphael feeling abandoned by Leo as well as feeling less appreciated by Splinter. Leonardo's vision of the world is perhaps wider than Raph's. In the first film prequel comic, Leo becomes angry with Raph for trying to leave them in order to save a man from being mugged because 4 heavily armed Triceratons in the sewers could cause devastation to the city. He becomes further angered when Raphael deserts them mid-battle to help an old man. This conflict suggests that the two brothers operate on different levels of morality, though neither is necessarily wrong. Raph states in the comic that he was tired of waiting for disaster to fall on his family and tired of fighting aliens while people in their own neighborhood are being mugged and murdered. Leo, on the other hand, believes that the world of men is the responsibility of the police, while Utroms and Triceratons are their domain... that they should fight only when there is no one else to solve the problem. This also engages Leo in a contradiction when he stays in Central America, using violence to fight local lawlessness and effectively deserting his brothers because he believes as Raph believes, that others need him more. Such parallels suggest that the two brothers are experiencing the same dedication to justice but in a different mentality, albeit in very different locales and using different tactics. In fact, when Leo tracks down and scolds the Nightwatcher (not knowing that he is Raphael), he remarks that he is well aware of the Nightwatcher's good intentions but cannot simply approve of the latter's methods.

Raph challenges Leonardo after arguing about their own individual sense of justice and the reasons for their actions. Leonardo discovers that Raphael is the Nightwatcher and the two engage in an emotional fight. Raph almost kills Leo out of anger and then retreats due to shame and his brother's deep and confused stare. Leo is captured by the Stone Generals and the Foot Clan but is rescued by his family later before the final battle where Leo and Raph finally resolve their differences, Raph accepting Leo as their leader while Leo confesses to needing Raph. Leo is voiced by James Arnold Taylor in this film.

=== Reboot series ===
Leonardo appears in Teenage Mutant Ninja Turtles, portrayed by Pete Ploszek in motion capture and voiced by Johnny Knoxville. In this film, he is dedicated to perfecting his ninjutsu skills and will stop at nothing to defend his brothers and the entire city. There are times when his cautious nature makes him clash with his brothers. Leonardo firmly believes it's his ninja duty to protect all people. He tends to have a similar personality to his other counterparts where he is determined to help people and keep his brothers in line. He and Raphael, unlike in their other adaptions, do fight over leadership although they have a brief argument over the Hamatshi and Raphael talking about leaving which Leo debunks Raph's claim. In the film, he, like Donnie and Raph, does not seek April's attention, unlike Mikey who does. He also appears in the sequel, Out of the Shadows, although Knoxville did not return to voice him. Pete Ploszek provided both motion-capture and voice for the character.

=== DC crossover film ===
Leonardo appears in the direct-to-video crossover film Batman vs. Teenage Mutant Ninja Turtles, voiced by Eric Bauza. He quickly bonds with Batman during the film and ends up defeating Ra's al Ghul in the climax.

=== Mutant Mayhem ===
Leonardo appears in Teenage Mutant Ninja Turtles: Mutant Mayhem, voiced by Nicolas Cantu. He is characterized as trying hard to be seen as serious, only for the others to mock him, making him feel slightly insecure about himself. Over the course of the film, he eventually comes into his own and starts to act more leader-like. He is also portrayed as having a crush on April O'Neil and is the first to suggest helping her, upon seeing her for the first time.

== Video games ==
In video games, Leonardo is usually portrayed as well-balanced, having strong abilities in all areas, and no glaring weaknesses. His range is rather long, but not as long as Donatello's; however, Leonardo can usually inflict more damage. In the Tournament Fighters games, his moves are the closest to a Ryu/Ken archetype from the Street Fighter franchise.

=== Appearances ===
- Leonardo appears in Teenage Mutant Ninja Turtles: Smash-Up as a playable character, with Michael Sinterniklaas reprising the role.
- He is one of the main playable characters in Teenage Mutant Ninja Turtles: Out of the Shadows, where he is voiced by Scott Whyte.
- He is played by his original voice actor Cam Clarke in a 2014 game for the Nintendo 3DS, based on the film of the same name: Teenage Mutant Ninja Turtles.
- Leonardo is featured as a playable character in DLC for Injustice 2, voiced by Corey Krueger. He is the default turtle outside the gear loadout, while the rest of his brothers can only be picked through the said loadout selection, similar to premier skin characters. In their single-player ending, Krang had sent them to the world where the war between the Insurgency and Regime was taking place. After the victory over Brainiac, Harley Quinn serves some pizza with 5-U-93-R. With this, they became powerful enough to return home and defeat Krang and Shredder.
- He is featured as a TMNT season pass in Smite as an Osiris skin, voiced by Matthew Curtis, and is also available as a skin in Brawlhalla.
- Leonardo also appeared in Nickelodeon All-Star Brawl, with Cam Clarke reprising his role.
- He is a main playable character in Teenage Mutant Ninja Turtles: Shredder's Revenge. This is the second official Teenage Mutant Ninja Turtles game in which he is once again played by his original voice actor, Cam Clarke.
- The Mutant Mayhem version of Leonardo is set to appear as a playable character via downloadable content in Sonic Racing: CrossWorlds.
