= Michelangelo (Teenage Mutant Ninja Turtles) =

Fictional character

- Teenage Mutant Ninja Turtles character
- Textless Planet Awesome exclusive cover variant of Teenage Mutant Ninja Turtles #80. Art by series co-creator Kevin Eastman
- First appearance: Teenage Mutant Ninja Turtles #1 (May 1984)
- Created by: Kevin Eastman; Peter Laird
- Portrayed by: Mainline: Michelan Sisti (1990 and 1991 films); David Fraser (Teenage Mutant Ninja Turtles III); Jarred Blanchard (Ninja Turtles: The Next Mutation); Noel Fisher (2014 and 2016 films)
- Voiced by: Mainline: Townsend Coleman (1987 series, Cartoon All-Stars to the Rescue, Operation Blue Line, 2012 series crossovers, Nickelodeon All-Star Brawl, Shredder's Revenge, Nickelodeon Kart Racers 3: Slime Speedway); Robbie Rist (1990 film, Secret of the Ooze, Teenage Mutant Ninja Turtles III); Kirby Morrow (The Next Mutation); Wayne Grayson (2003 series, Turtles in Time Re-Shelled, Smash-Up, Turtles Forever); Mikey Kelley (2007 film and video game); Greg Cipes (2012 series, Turtles Take Time (and Space), Danger of the Ooze, Half-Shell Heroes: Blast to the Past, Portal Power, old Michelangelo in Teenage Mecha Ninja Turtles, Nickelodeon Extreme Tennis); Noel Fisher (2014 and 2016 films); Brandon Mychal Smith (Rise of the Teenage Mutant Ninja Turtles series and film); Shamon Brown Jr. (Mutant Mayhem and 2024 series); Others: Johnny Castro ('87 counterpart in Turtles Forever); Bradford Cameron (Mirage counterpart in Turtles Forever); Pierce Cravens (2013 video game); Peter Oldring (2014 film tie-in games); Robbie Daymond (Mutants in Manhattan); Kyle Mooney (DC crossover film); Yuri Lowenthal (Splintered Fate)

In-universe information
- Species: Mutant turtle
- Affiliation: Teenage Mutant Ninja Turtles
- Weapon: Dual nunchaku
- Family: Master Splinter (adoptive father); Leonardo, Donatello and Raphael (brothers)
- Home: New York Sewers, United States
- Abilities: Mastery of ninjutsu, kobudō, chi gong, and stealth; Superhuman agility, speed, and strength; Mastery of kusarigama and nunchaku; Talented chef; Electrokinesis (2012)

Michelangelo, nicknamed Mikey or Mike, is a superhero and one of the four main characters of the Teenage Mutant Ninja Turtles comics and all related media. Characterized as the most naturally talented of the four brothers, Michelangelo prefers leisure to training martial arts. Aside from being the most jocular and energetic of the team, he is shown to be rather immature; he is known for his wisecracks, quick-wit, optimism, and love of skateboarding and pizza. He is usually depicted wearing an orange eye mask. His signature weapons are a single or dual nunchaku, though he has also been portrayed using other weapons, such as a grappling hook, manriki-gusari, kusarigama, tonfa, and a three-section staff (in some action figures). He is commonly portrayed in media as speaking with a California accent and is most associated with the "Cowabunga" expression that became a pop culture phenomenon.

Michelangelo was given a much bigger role in the 1987 animated series and subsequent series and films, directed at a younger audience, than in the more serious Mirage comic books, which were aimed at an older audience. He often coins most of their catchphrases, such as "Cowabunga!" and "Booyakasha!" in the 2012 series.

Like all of the brothers, he is named after an Italian Renaissance artist; in this case, he is named after Michelangelo. His name was originally spelled "Michaelangelo" by the creators, possibly spelling his namesake's name wrong by confusion with "Michael". In the Mirage comics, all four of the Turtles wear red masks, but to tell them apart, he was given an orange mask in subsequent media.

An alternate universe version of Michelangelo was also the main protagonist in the five-issue miniseries The Last Ronin.

== Comic books ==
=== Mirage Comics ===
In the Mirage comic books, Michelangelo was initially depicted as fun-loving, carefree, happy-go-lucky, and, while not as aggressive as Raphael, always ready to fight. He is much more serious-natured in the comic book than in the film incarnations, which have labeled his character a permanent "dude" talking teenager. It was Michelangelo's one-shot in this series that fleshed out most of the traits that have become synonymous with the character, such as his playfulness, empathy, and easygoing nature. In the one-shot story, Michelangelo adopts a stray cat (which he names Klunk) and also stops thieves from stealing toys meant for orphaned children.

After their defeat at the hands of the Foot Clan, the Turtles, Splinter, April O'Neil, and Casey Jones retreat to a farmhouse in Northampton, Massachusetts which used to belong to Casey's grandmother. While there, April is worried to note that Michelangelo is not himself. He spends his days in the barn taking out his aggression on a punching bag. A scene shows him lashing out at his surroundings and repeatedly punching the wall of the barn until it breaks, then collapsing on it despondently, anger spent. The end of the story implies that Michelangelo's sorrow and frustration have been resolved, as subsequent issues restore Michelangelo's more relaxed, optimistic personality.

It is during the group's time at the farm we learn that Michelangelo also has an interest in comic books, specifically ones involving superheroes such as "The Justice Force" (comic book heroes based on the Justice League and the Fantastic Four). He also finds solace in writing fiction and has produced a story depicting himself as a rōnin in Feudal Japan (vol. 1 Issue #17).

In the story arc City at War, Michelangelo instantly bonds with Casey Jones' adopted daughter Shadow, who nicknames him "Rooish". In the second volume, the Turtles decide to try to live apart from one another. Michelangelo, the social creature that he is, moves in with April and Casey so that he can be close to Shadow. Throughout the first two volumes, Michelangelo seemed to act as the peacemaker of the team. These stories also laid the foundations which demonstrated his closeness with his brother Donatello, their laid-back natures separating them from the more contentious Leonardo and Raphael.

In Volume 4, Michelangelo gets a job as a tour guide showing alien visitors around Earth. His first (and only) tourist is the Regenta (or "princess") Seri of the Styracodon race. Michelangelo convinces Seri to sneak away from her bodyguards so that he can take her on a tour of the northwest coast of the US. Their relationship becomes more intimate, and Seri delivers eggs that will soon hatch into children. Unfortunately, before much time is given for him to settle with this news Seri's bodyguards become aware of his machinations. They attack Michelangelo and transport him back to their homeworld, where he is placed in prison, kept away from Seri and their unborn children. With the help of a Triceraton prisoner named Azokk, he manages to escape and is rescued by a group of Triceratons who came to rescue Azokk. The ordeal results in Mikey's personality taking a very dark turn, having been hardened by the cruelty of the extrajudicial prison and Azokk's death. Upon the Triceratons learning of Azokk's death, they declare war on the Styracodons and carry out a genocidal assault against them. Michelangelo, embittered by Seri's apparent betrayal, joins forces with the Triceratons and gladly aids them in acts of genocide against the Styracodons.

Michelangelo was not given an especially large role in Volumes 1 and 2, did little to advance the plot and was often not portrayed as an especially skilled fighter. His relatively small role was probably due to the need to establish Leonardo's role as "leader" along with the fact that Donatello was Peter Laird's favorite Turtle, and Raphael was Kevin Eastman's favorite.

This incarnation of Michelangelo appeared in the Turtles Forever crossover special voiced by Bradford Scobie.

=== Image Comics ===
In the comics published by Image Comics, retroactively setting the Mirage Comics series in the Image Universe, Michelangelo's interest in writing is expanded upon and he is established as a writer of fiction and poetry. During this series, Michelangelo develops a romantic relationship with Horridus, whom he credits as his muse in writing. But the relationship would not last, (as the story may have begun after Rapture's death), she started staying with Officer Dragon and had developed an attraction to him; though Dragon did not know it himself. Michelangelo would be heartbroken when Sara dumps him. An early issue has him selling his first poem to a poetry digest. As the comic continued, Michelangelo's career as a writer gradually expanded. In the final issue, he has published his first novel, a romance called "A Rose Among the Thorns". April mentions that the book was already going back for a second printing and that she had heard that Oprah Winfrey loved it, which "practically guarantees that it will be a best-seller." Michelangelo is the only Turtle who did not end up disfigured in some way in this series; Leonardo lost his left hand and had it replaced by a steel cap with a retractable blade, Raphael was facially disfigured after being shot in the face, and Donatello was transformed into a cyborg after being shot and thrown out of a helicopter. Mikey asked Sara for her hand in marriage but was denied. Michelangelo was last seen arriving at the Northampton farmhouse with his family in the final issue.

=== Archie Comics ===
In the Archie Comics series, Michelangelo was initially presented very similarly to his 1987 cartoon portrayal — understandably, considering that the comic started as an adaptation of the popular animated series. As the series progressed, Archie's "Michaelangelo" was presented as more mature than the cartoon version. This version developed also an interest in poetry. During a battle, he was temporarily blinded and later captured by the US military, whereupon he was interrogated and tortured. He was eventually rescued by his family and saved the life of the man who tortured him.

One of his many skills in the Archie comics was the ability to communicate with animals. In a storyline set in the future, Michelangelo is shown to have become an artist whose main job is running an orphanage.

=== IDW Comics ===
Michelangelo like his brothers was reincarnated into a turtle after he was slain by Oroku Saki. He is also the youngest turtle as shown in his human form when he was the only baby among his brothers. He is more mature in this incarnation than others, but is still sociable, for example, bonding with the Mighty Mutanimals and with pizza boy Woody Dirkins. Unfortunately, Michelangelo's friendship with Woody waned, as shown in Teenage Mutant Ninja Turtles Issue 15, when Slash frightened Woody and he left a note for Michelangelo stating that he could not handle the troubles that followed them. However, their rift only lasted briefly before once more reuniting in issue 26. Michelangelo is good friends with all Mutanimals but can be unsure about Old Hob, remembering how Hob had been their enemy. Further, Michelangelo was occasionally anxious about them, showing some concern in Issue 68, in which Hob told the Turtles that Slash had been mind-controlled, taken out all the Mutanimals, and helped capture them for the Earth Protection Force, as well as in Issue 70, in which Michelangelo wondered whether Slash would be okay. Michelangelo is also the most sensitive turtle: e.g., in Issue 50 he couldn't handle Splinter accepting the leadership of the Foot Clan. In this incarnation, Michelangelo is romantically interested in Neutrino: Princess Trib instead of Kala based on the 1987 TV series. Michelangelo's kindness found him supporting Donatello's ideas for just about everything, as when Raphael introduced Donatello's tracking device (embedded in a shuriken) in the "Secret History of the Foot Clan". The after-effects of the war left Michelangelo distraught seeing that he was strict with Raphael when they were mourning Donnie's injuries. He also shows signs of intelligence when he decodes ancient Japanese text in the "Ashi no Himitsu" book that tells the secrets of the Foot Clan. Furthermore, he was not afraid to confront Splinter when he had taken the orphans with him to prevent them from training as Foot Ninja. Eventually, he convinced Splinter to listen to him and won their debate. Nonetheless, Michelangelo is still as fun-loving a turtle as in other bodacious versions of himself.

=== The Last Ronin ===
A darker, alternate version of Michelangelo is also the primary protagonist of the miniseries The Last Ronin. Set in an alternate dystopian future, Michelangelo is the last surviving member of his family after his brothers, Splinter and Casey were slain by the Foot Clan, and after spending over a decade training across the world, Mikey returns to New York seeking to avenge the death of his brothers by killing the Shredder's grandson, Oroku Hiroto. In the miniseries, along with his signature nunchucks, Michelangelo also wields the weapons of his brothers, including Leonardo's katanas, Donatello's bo staff, and Raphael's sai.

== Television ==
=== 1987 animated series ===
Michelangelo's persona became strongly established in the 1987 animated series. He was often seen as a "Party Dude", which, though accurate in the 1987 series (which gave him this title in the theme song), accounts for only part of his personality otherwise. As the "party dude", he usually did not have much input in the team's plans, although he was still just as active as his brothers. He typically spent much of his time joking and socializing with other characters.

Michelangelo began the series with his trademark nunchaku as his weapons, but the controversy surrounding the weapons in the United Kingdom led to scenes of their use being edited out of the local broadcast of the series. To compensate for this, the American showrunners dropped the nunchaku from the series entirely in the fourth season, replacing them with a grappling hook called the "Turtle Line" that served as Mikey's signature weapon for the rest of the show's run.

Michelangelo also received his distinctive voice in the 1987 series; this has been imitated in other portrayals of him. Employing a "surfer slang" vocabulary, he customarily spoke with a unique hybrid of a Californian surfer accent and a possibly stereotypical "stoner" accent, though no reference is ever made to drugs in the series and it is likely that the voicing simply emphasized his laid-back and somewhat innocent attitude. In fact, Michelangelo appeared in a 1990 animated special, Cartoon All-Stars to the Rescue, alongside other famous cartoon characters, intended to inform children about the dangers of substance abuse. Additionally, all four of the Turtles were official "spokes-turtles" of the "Just Say No" anti-drug campaign, despite accusations that at least one of them exhibited characteristics of a stoner. During one of these anti-drug PSAs, Michelangelo suggests to a kid being tempted with marijuana that he should "get a pizza" to go with it before the idea is shot down by Donatello.

Michelangelo's voice actor was Townsend Coleman in the 1987 series' and Johnny Castro in the 25th-anniversary film Turtles Forever. Michelangelo also made a couple of appearances in the 2012 series in the episode, The Manhattan Project. He and the other turtles along with Casey and April are seen through a portal by their 2012 counterparts walking on a road and he made a speaking cameo along with the other turtles at the end of the episode when a space worm from the 2012 dimension started terrorizing the street. All four turtles see the worm and spring into action while shouting their famous catchphrase, 'Cowabunga'. Townsend Coleman reprised his role as Michelangelo for the cameo. This would mark the first time in over 28 years the 1987 TMNT cast would return to their roles, with the sole exception of Rob Paulsen who returned to the TMNT franchise as Donatello in the 2012 series. The 1987 turtles also had a crossover with the 2012 turtles in the season 4 episode, "Trans-Dimensional Turtles" then in the three-part series final "Wanted: Bebop & Rocksteady".

=== Coming Out of Their Shells tour ===
The live-action "Coming Out of Their Shells" concert tour, whose initial show at Radio City Music Hall would be released on Pay per view and later VHS, would see Michelangelo take the role of the band's lead singer and guitarist. The character retained his fun-loving attitude and was the most vocal member of the band in the non-musical spoken segments. During the Cowabunga song portion of the show, Michelangelo claims that he sees Raphael as his very best friend and that Raphael wrote the music for all the Turtles' songs, while Michelangelo wrote the lyrics. This is somewhat in keeping with the Mirage and Image comics' depictions of Michelangelo as a writer and poet. During the event, Michelangelo sings an exclusive ballad not included in the cassette or CD releases for the show called Follow Your Heart near the show's climax when the Turtles begin to feel as though their efforts to defeat Shredder's plans to steal all the music in the world are doomed to failure. The song manages to bring the Turtles around, and the team immediately begins making plans to defeat Shredder's machine and army, which ultimately succeeds. The Making of VHS tape, which acts as an 'in-universe' supplement to the Radio City Music Hall show and treats the Turtles as real people rather than fictional characters, follows up on the idea that Michelangelo and Raphael had been the driving force behind the band and also indicated that they had stumbled onto the idea by pure accident. The two turtles in question state in the video that they had simply been playing around with some sewer pipes and singing while waiting for a pizza to be delivered. Realizing they had been creating music and finding they enjoyed the experience, they continued to pursue music as a hobby and eventually brought Leonardo and Donatello in on it, leading to them becoming the band depicted in the concerts.

=== 1997 live-action series ===
In the live-action series, Ninja Turtles: The Next Mutation, Michelangelo was played by Jarred Blancard, and voiced by Kirby Morrow. In the crossover episode with Power Rangers in Space, "Shell Shocked", Michelangelo is voiced by Tony Oliver.

=== 2003 animated series ===
In the 2003 TV series, Michelangelo is voiced by Wayne Grayson and speaks with a California accent. Known as 'Mikey' to his brothers, his personality is more akin to the Mirage comics than the 1987 show. Still the comic relief, he often makes statements that spoof pop culture, although he uses less surfer slang than in the 1987 cartoon. His trademark nunchaku is once again his primary weapon, but he has used other weapons such as grappling hooks and those of his brothers. He is slightly more immature than in the Mirage comics-particularly apparent by a high-pitched scream, however, he undergoes character development and becomes more mature as the series progresses. Unlike other incarnations, he was often more reluctant to fight and he often likes to tease and annoy his older brothers, especially Raphael, for whom Michelangelo is the foil. In fact, a running gag is that whenever Michelangelo says or does something stupid, usually involving a catch-phrase from the 1987 show, one of his brothers (usually Raphael) will slap him on the head. Other characters such as Master Splinter and the Ancient One have picked up on this habit but usually whenever he disobeys. In the Fast Forward episode Timing is Everything when Michelangelo was talking too much, Splinter flipped over the seat he was sitting on causing him to fall on the ground, replying afterwards that "Somebody had to do it. It was... time."

Raphael and Michelangelo mostly have a love-hate relationship in which Michelangelo frequently antagonizes Raphael (it especially hurts Raphael's pride that Michelangelo has bested him more than once, both times because Raphael's anger got in the way), but Raphael shows that he cares about him whenever he is in danger. He also seems to be very close with Donatello, where the two are often paired together when Leonardo and Raphael are either arguing or training. Also, Mikey is often the one most enthusiastic about Donatello's newest finished invention and would jump straight into "helping" Don with his first test run on it, though his "help" is not greatly appreciated by the latter and often generates more trouble. Donatello has also invented a hovercraft- a flying skateboard, at one point of time in Season 2 as means of keeping him quiet while Donatello himself worked. His closest bond is with his oldest brother Leonardo whom he looks up to and idolizes greatly. Even though his older brothers are irritated with him, he is still a lovable brother and like a baby brother to them. When Mikey was a kid, he and his brothers went with Splinter to Japan to bury Master Yoshi's ashes next to his beloved. While there they helped Master Splinter and the Ancient One win a fight against a ghost that was sent by the Foot Mystics to revive the Demon Shredder and that is when they gain their ninja masks. This happens in the episode (Fathers and Sons).

Michelangelo is the youngest brother, also appointed to be "the one with the brightest fire" or with the most potential by The Ancient One. Master Splinter also claims a few times that Michelangelo obtains the most "raw talent" of all the brothers. Although, both Splinter and The Ancient One, say because of Michelangelo's lack of focus and interest in training, he will probably never meet his full potential. Michelangelo also claims many times in this series that he wishes not to be so serious and focused as his eldest brother, Leonardo. He also tells his other brothers to "chillax" and not be so serious all the time.

He has shown innocent empathy for others as shown in particular by his adoption of Klunk the stray kitten, to whom he is very close and also by his relationship with Leatherhead. It is his initial awareness of Leatherhead's humanity which ends up forging the bond between the crocodile and the other Turtles. He enjoys Leatherhead's company, although he can tease him on occasion against his better judgment. However, he cares greatly for the crocodile and is quick and willing to forgive and reassure him when a rampaging Leatherhead injures him in a blind, nightmarish rage in the episode 'Hunted.' Leatherhead also appears to care greatly for Michelangelo and is distraught when he believes he has fatally injured him, but delighted to discover that his fears are unfounded when he finds out that the turtle is alive and well.

In early profiles of the 2003 animated series, Michelangelo is regarded as being both the most athletic of the four, and as possessing the single greatest potential in the martial arts out of the quartet, although unfocused on training mentally (though those are admittedly old profiles and may have been early plans for the character, he has certainly proven he is an effective fighter when need be) which prevents him from reaching his fullest potential. This profile statement has since been repeated in the profile of Michelangelo in the lead-up to the debut of the Fast Forward season which began airing on July 29, 2006.

=== 2012 animated series ===
Michelangelo, as depicted in the Nickelodeon TV series

In the 2012 series, Michelangelo uses both a Kusarigama and Nunchaku. His character design was updated as well, making him slightly shorter than his brothers and giving him dark freckles as well as shorter tails on his mask. Mikey is voiced by Greg Cipes.

Mikey is the youngest brother and is prone to goofing off rather than focusing on his training. However, he is still an impressive fighter. His natural affinity for the martial arts is present in his ability to learn moves after seeing them only a few times. He also has the ability to fight without "thinking", once deflecting Splinter's blows while listening to music with his eyes closed, which was something that Donatello had to learn (Although he was unable to do this when directly asked to fight without thinking in their first fight with the telepathic Victor Falco). Also, Mikey has a rare ability to see something off in people and mutants, shown when a Kraang robot that looks exactly like April's mother (dubbed "Mom-Thing" by Raphael as a reference to The Thing), and with two of the Mighty Mutanimals, Slash and Dr. Rockwell, after they escape capture from the Shredder.

Mikey seems to respect Leonardo and although there are few scenes with them interacting together in the first two seasons, it's clear that Leonardo cares about his youngest brother. In season three, however, the two of them go on missions together. While looking for Karai one evening, they worked together to rescue their brothers, April, and Casey from Bebop and Rocksteady. After Karai is captured by Shredder, Leo volunteers to go solo to find a way to help her, Mikey tags alongside him and assures him he is there for him. When Mikey gets eaten by the MegaShredder, Leo fights with all of his might to save him. After Mikey escapes from inside the monster, Leo is overjoyed to see him alive and is proud of the work they have done. Raphael is normally seen as the one Mikey loves to hang out with, usually to Raph's ire. Although Raph repeatedly gives Mikey a beat down for his antics (usually in the form of slapping him to make him shut up), he occasionally shows a more sensitive side when Mikey is feeling down. Particularly at the end of season 2 and the first half of season 3, Raphael is much kinder to Michelangelo and often refers to him affectionately as "little brother". He is also less inclined to slap Mikey, instead flicking him with a finger as a sort of "warning". Of all his brothers, Mikey seems to be the closest to Donatello. This probably stems from the fact that although they are very different, they both share a curiosity about things outside ninjutsu. Mikey greatly admires Donnie's new gadgets and is normally the first to test them out.

Michelangelo also has an affinity for animals in this incarnation, as well as a fear of squirrels. He adopted a cat April found on the street after the cat ate some mutagen Mikey had spilled ice cream in, resulting in the cat mutating into living ice cream. Michelangelo often tells Ice Cream Kitty his innermost feelings and fears, and not feel judged by them - as often his brothers find Mikey's concerns and thoughts too silly to be worth their time, though said concerns end up being true quite often.

In season 4, when traveling with his brothers, April, Casey, and a robot called the Fugitoid, Mikey's mind is invaded by microscopic aliens, but his brothers soon chase the robots in a strange world in Mikey's subconscious and soon defeat them, putting Mikey's mind back to normal.

=== Rise of the Teenage Mutant Ninja Turtles ===
Michelangelo as depicted in Rise of the Teenage Mutant Ninja Turtles: The Movie

In the 2018 animated series, Rise of the Teenage Mutant Ninja Turtles, Brandon Mychal Smith voices a Michelangelo described as "the youngest brother, an artist and awesome skateboarder with a wild colorful, and imaginative personality." This incarnation of Michelangelo lacks a surfer accent and likes to refer to himself as the artist of the group. He possesses a more childlike naiveness. He also has a strong passion for cooking too.

Michelangelo uses a mystic Kusari Fundo, the fiery end of which features a spooky face. He is seen to be able to lift and throw massive objects while in a battle against the Shredder like docked ships and vehicles. Mikey often uses this weapon to show his agility by swinging around the city, using it as a grappling hook. Mikey often uses this in a combination attack with his ninja brothers and is seen swinging them toward an opponent at high speeds so they can deliver a swift blow.

In this series, Michelangelo's character design is based on a box turtle, and he is one of the only brothers who is able to retract his legs and limbs into his shell. This can be seen in the first episode "Mystic Mayhem" when Raphael grabs his shell and throws him.

Michelangelo often acts as the peacemaker, and it is really important to him that his family / extended family be on good terms with one another. This can be seen when he invites his brothers, and father Splinter to a meal with the hopes that they will reconcile with Draxum.

In Rise of the Teenage Mutant Ninja Turtles: The Movie, Mikey mostly takes a backseat throughout the film looking out for Donnie and trying to unlock mystic powers throughout the film that his future self used to send Casey Jones back in time. The latter ends up paying off as Mikey ends up unlocking the power's and used them to rescue Leonardo from the prison dimension.

== Film ==
=== Original trilogy (1990–1993) ===
Michelangelo is depicted in the live-action films as the easy-going, free-spirited turtle. He speaks with a distinctive California accent (that was imitated in the later versions of TMNT), In the first film, he and Donatello (who was instead portrayed as the skateboarder of the team) were regularly paired together while Leonardo and Raphael were arguing. In the first film and the first sequel, Teenage Mutant Ninja Turtles II: The Secret of the Ooze, he was portrayed by Michelan Sisti; in the second sequel, Teenage Mutant Ninja Turtles III, he was portrayed by David Fraser. In all three films, he was voiced by Robbie Rist.

=== 2007 film ===
In TMNT, Mikey has taken to performing at children's birthday parties as "Cowabunga Carl" in order to help make ends meet to support his family. It becomes apparent early in the film that the physical and emotional absence of his older brothers has finally begun to affect the outgoing Michelangelo; when he returns home from work and announces his presence and no one acknowledges him, he sighs "Whatever..this place used to be fun". Unlike his other incarnations, the 2007 Mikey seems to draw the most emotional support from Donatello instead of his oldest brothers, Leonardo and Raphael. Upon Leonardo's return from Central America, Mikey gives his oldest brother an enthusiastic hug, falling over the couch and tripping over furniture in his excitement. Mikey's lively and innocent demeanor returns in full force when he is in the protective presence of his three brothers again, his good-natured jokes and brief commentaries lightening even in hard situations. Clearly, despite the hardship that his family has recently experienced, Michelangelo has retained much of his usual goofy, laid-back personality and still remains the main form of funny. He is voiced by Mikey Kelley. He is a skilled skateboarder in this film, able to complete many tricks underground.

=== Reboot (2014–2016) ===
Michelangelo appears in Teenage Mutant Ninja Turtles portrayed by Noel Fisher. In the film, he is the youngest and the jokester of the group who loves watching viral videos, playing video games, and skateboarding. Michelangelo tries to find humor in any situation. However, he proves to be a great fighter if someone messes with him and his brothers. He is not afraid to express his true feelings and also has a crush on April, who does not return her feelings to him. In the end, when the Turtles are leaving in their van after Mikey blows up Vern Fenwick's car, Mikey tries to impress April by singing The Turtles' "Happy Together". He appears in the sequel, Teenage Mutant Ninja Turtles: Out of the Shadows, with Fisher reprising the role.

=== DC crossover film ===
Michelangelo appears in the direct-to-video crossover film Batman vs. Teenage Mutant Ninja Turtles released in 2019, and voiced by Kyle Mooney.

=== Mutant Mayhem ===
Michelangelo appears in Teenage Mutant Ninja Turtles: Mutant Mayhem, and is voiced by real teenager Shamon Brown Jr. Much like his other counterparts, he is a jokester and most interested in wanting to be part of the real world. He becomes close friends with Mondo Gecko due to their mutual personalities and being more loose and carefree.

== Video games ==
In the video games based on the 1987 animated series, Michelangelo is virtually identical to Leonardo on every level except attack range. However, to reflect his flashy personality, he was changed and became the most agile Turtle in the video games based on the 2003 animated series while Raphael was the least skilled. In TMNT: Smash Up, he is voiced by Wayne Grayson.

Michelangelo is one of the main playable characters in Teenage Mutant Ninja Turtles: Out of the Shadows, where he is voiced by Pierce Cravens. Michelangelo also appears in the 2014 film-based game, voiced by Peter Oldring.

Michelangelo is featured as one of the playable characters from Teenage Mutant Ninja Turtles as DLC in Injustice 2, voiced by Ryan Cooper. While Leonardo is the default turtle, Michelangelo, Raphael, and Donatello can be picked through selection similar to other premier skin characters.

Michelangelo is featured as a TMNT season pass in Smite as a Mercury skin, voiced by Nick Landis. He is also available as a skin in Brawlhalla.

Michelangelo is also a main playable character in Teenage Mutant Ninja Turtles: Shredder's Revenge. In the game, Michelangelo is now the fastest turtle with low range and average power, as opposed to the original, in which he has average speed, average range, and high power. This is the first official Teenage Mutant Ninja Turtles game in which he is played by his original voice actor, Townsend Coleman.

Michelangelo is a playable character in Nickelodeon All-Star Brawl, with Townsend Coleman reprising his role.

The Mutant Mayhem version of Michelangelo appears in the 2025 video game Tony Hawk's Pro Skater 3 + 4 as a playable skater. He also appears as a playable character via downloadable content in Sonic Racing: CrossWorlds.

== Spelling ==
The character's name was originally spelled as "Michaelangelo", with an additional "a". This spelling was used until 2001 with Volume 4 of the comic series from Mirage Studios when the spelling was officially changed to "Michelangelo". The 1996 anime also used the "Michelangelo" spelling. On the TMNT teaser poster featuring Michelangelo, the character's name is spelled "Michaelangelo", though the film uses the proper spelling of the name in its credits.

== Klunk ==
Klunk is Michelangelo's pet cat. He first appeared in the Michelangelo microseries, and was hit by a car and died in the Tales of the TMNT vol. 2 issue 9. Shortly after, the Turtles discovered that Klunk had mated and had kittens with an alley cat.

Klunk also appears in a few episodes of the 2003 series, starting with The Christmas Aliens. Based on the revamped character designs in the Back to the Sewer season, this version of Klunk appears to be female, whereas the Klunk from the Mirage comics was confirmed to be male.
