= Teenage Mutant Ninja Turtles II: The Secret of the Ooze =

1991 film by Michael Pressman

- Theatrical release poster
- Directed by: Michael Pressman
- Written by: Todd W. Langen
- Based on: Characters created by: Kevin Eastman; Peter Laird
- Produced by: Thomas K. Gray; Kim Dawson; David Chan
- Starring: Paige Turco; David Warner
- Cinematography: Shelly Johnson
- Edited by: Steve Mirkovich; John Wright
- Music by: John Du Prez
- Production companies: Golden Harvest Entertainment Company; Mirage Studios
- Distributed by: New Line Cinema (United States); Panasia Films (Hong Kong); 20th Century Fox (International)
- Release date: March 22, 1991
- Running time: 88 minutes
- Countries: United States; Hong Kong
- Language: English
- Budget: $25 million
- Box office: $80.1 million

Teenage Mutant Ninja Turtles II: The Secret of the Ooze is a 1991 American superhero comedy film directed by Michael Pressman and written by Todd W. Langen. Based on the Teenage Mutant Ninja Turtles characters, it is the sequel to the 1990 film Teenage Mutant Ninja Turtles, and stars Paige Turco (replacing Judith Hoag as April O'Neil) and David Warner. Picking up after the events of the first film, the Turtles once again face off against the Shredder and the Foot Clan, as both sides uncover the truth behind the Turtles' mutagenic origins.

The film was released theatrically in the United States on March 22, 1991, by New Line Cinema. It received mixed reviews from critics, who said it departed from the much darker tone of the original 1990 film. It was financially successful, grossing $78.7 million against a budget of $25 million, becoming the thirteenth highest-grossing film domestically in the year of its release. A sequel, Teenage Mutant Ninja Turtles III, was released in 1993.

== Plot ==
Shortly after the Teenage Mutant Ninja Turtles defeat the Shredder in New York City (Note: As depicted in Teenage Mutant Ninja Turtles (1990)), Keno, a skilled martial artist and pizza delivery boy, encounters burglars at a mall. The burglars attack and overwhelm Keno before the Turtles arrive. They rescue Keno, tie up the burglars, and vanish.

Leonardo, Raphael, Donatello and Michelangelo, along with their master Splinter, live with April O'Neil in her new apartment while they look for a new place to live. Splinter wishes to remain in the shadows, while Raphael advocates a more open existence. At a junkyard where the remnants of The Foot are hiding out, they are met by their master, disfigured by his previous defeat and vowing revenge on the turtles.

April interviews Professor Jordan Perry of Techno Global Research Industries (TGRI) about a possible toxic waste leak. He assures her everything is fine, but the scientists secretly discover dandelions mutated by the leak. Freddy, a Foot Clan spy, collects one of the dandelions and reports it to his master, who decides to have Perry interrogated. Back at April's apartment, Splinter tells her and the turtles that TGRI created the mutagen (dubbed "Ooze" by the turtles) that mutated them 15 years earlier, and they decide to talk to Perry too. The Foot gets to Perry first and kidnaps him, salvaging the last canister of ooze in the process. The turtles ultimately fail to recover the canister. Afterward, Keno gets into April's apartment under the guise of delivering pizza and discovers Splinter and the turtles.

At the Shredder's hideout, Perry is forced to use the remaining ooze on a snapping turtle and a wolf, which mutates them into Tokka and Rahzar, respectively. Despite having infant mindsets, they wield enormous strength. With the Foot Clan's imminent threat to April's safety, the turtles begin actively looking for a new home. After arguing with Leonardo, Raphael breaks off from the group. Michelangelo discovers the abandoned City Hall subway station and deems it a perfect hideout. Raphael and Keno disregard Splinter's orders and recruit Keno into the Foot Clan to find their hideout. They are eventually discovered, and Raphael is captured, while Keno escapes to warn the others. When they arrive, the Shredder and the Foot ambush them; Splinter saves the group, but leaves as they face Tokka and Rahzar, who prove too strong to defeat. Donatello finds a bound and gagged Perry after being tossed into a building by Tokka, and the five of them make a tactical retreat. Back in their hideout, Perry explains that creating the ooze was an accident, disheartening Donatello, Leonardo, and Raphael, who saw a higher purpose for their existence.

The Shredder unleashes Tokka and Rahzar into a nearby neighborhood to cause damage. The next day, Freddy messages April that Tokka and Rahzar will be released into Central Park if the turtles don't meet the Foot Clan at the construction site. Perry develops an antidote that reverses the mutations when ingested. When the turtles confront the Foot at the site, they try to trick Tokka and Rahzar into eating the antidote by using donuts. Tokka and Rahzar discover the ruse and brutally attack, throwing Raphael into a public dance club. A big fight ensues among hundreds of witnesses. Eventually, the turtles use fire extinguishers to speed up Tokka and Rahzar's digestion and revert them to their natural states. Keno arrives as backup, and Shredder appears, taking a female clubgoer hostage. He threatens to use the last of the ooze on her, but is thwarted and sent flying out to the docks. Shredder is transformed into a Super Shredder after consuming the last of the ooze. The heavily mutated Shredder is too strong for the turtles to fight, but they seek refuge in the bay while he rips the dock apart in his rampage, causing it to collapse and kill him.

In a press release, April reads a note from Perry, thanking the turtles for saving him. When they return home, Splinter orders them to do ten flips as punishment for being seen by humans, as the morning's newspaper reveals.

== Cast ==
- Paige Turco / Hynden Walch (voice) as April O'Neil: A news reporter for Channel 3 and the human companion of the Turtles and Splinter.
- David Warner / Frank Oz (voice) as Casey Jones: Professor Jordan Perry: A scientist who works for the TGRI company as head scientist.
- Ernie Reyes Jr. as Keno: A pizza delivery boy and martial arts expert who befriends the turtles.
- Kevin Clash (puppeteer/voice) as Splinter: a wise mutant rat who is the sensei and father figure of the turtles.
- Raymond Serra as Chief Sterns: The chief of the New York City Police Department.
- Toshishiro Obata / Michael McConnohie (voice) as Tatsu: The second-in-command and temporary leader of the Foot Clan.
- Michelan Sisti (puppeteer) and Robbie Rist (voice) as Michelangelo: The least-mature and fun-loving partier of the Turtles.
- Leif Tilden (puppeteer) and Adam Carl (voice) as Donatello: The smart one of the Turtles.
- Mark Caso (puppeteer) and Brian Tochi (voice) as Leonardo: the leader and oldest of the Turtles.
- Kenn Scott (puppeteer) and Laurie Faso (voice) as Raphael: The strong and angry member of the Turtles.

The cast also includes François Chau as the Shredder (voiced by David McCharen), the Turtles' and Splinter's arch-nemesis, with Kevin Nash playing his mutated form, Super Shredder. Kurt Bryant and Mark Ginther play Tokka and Rahzar (both voiced by Frank Welker), a mutated alligator snapping turtle and a mutated wolf, respectively, created by Professor Perry under orders from the Shredder using a canister of ooze stolen from the TGRI company. Director Michael Pressman plays Channel 3's news manager and Mark Caso portrays a staffer who informs April of the Turtles' phone call; Pressman's parents, Sasha and David, play the older couple who witness Tokka and Rahzar's night attack. Mark Doerr plays Freddie, a Foot Clan messenger who poses as April's cameraman. Additional Foot Clan members are portrayed by Leif Tilden (Foot #3) and Dewey Webber (Foot Recruiter). Vanilla Ice and Earthquake respectively appear as a performer and a disc jockey at the Dockshore Club.

== Production ==
Due to the massive success of the first film, a sequel was expected. The film was produced on a budget of US$25 million, nearly twice the budget of the 1990 film, which was $13.5 million. Like the first film, New Line Cinema distributed The Secret of the Ooze. Both Robbie Rist and Brian Tochi reprised their roles as the voice actors of Michelangelo and Leonardo in the second film, but Corey Feldman did not voice Donatello in the second film after pleading no contest to a drug possession charge in December 1990. Feldman was replaced by Adam Carl in this film although he would later return as Donatello's voice in Teenage Mutant Ninja Turtles III. Josh Pais did not reprise the role of Raphael, and he was replaced by Laurie Faso and Kenn Scott (who is credited under the name Kenn Troum) as the voice and costumed performer, respectively; Scott was previously Raphael's in-suit fighting double. Cast as April O'Neil, Paige Turco succeeded Judith Hoag from the first film, for this film and Teenage Mutant Ninja Turtles III. According to Hoag, she was not approached to reprise the role because the producers thought she complained too much during the first film about the strenuous shooting schedule and amount of violence. The character of Casey Jones, who was prominent in the first film, did not appear here though he returned in the following film. Ernie Reyes Jr., who was Donatello's fight double in the first film, was cast as a new character, Keno, as the producers admired Reyes and his performance in the first film so much they asked him to join the sequel. François Chau replaces James Saito as the Shredder. In July 2022, Kevin Nash revealed that Kevin Peter Hall was originally cast as the physical actor for the Super Shredder. Todd W. Langen returned from the first film to write the screenplay.

The characters of Bebop and Rocksteady, who were popular villains in the 1987 animated series, could not be used due to Peter Laird objecting, with the latter stating that "their constant one-note shtick in the first animated series [was] extremely annoying and silly to the point of being stupid". As a result, Tokka and Rahzar were created. However, Eastman states that he and Laird initially intended Bebop and Rocksteady to be in the film, but ultimately decided to do new mutants to expand the franchise.

The Turtles fight bare-fisted for much of this film, to tone down the violence. The abandoned subway station, the new lair for the Turtles, was based on the real-life decommissioned City Hall station of the New York City Subway, built by the former Interborough Rapid Transit Company. The station is not completely abandoned, as it appears in the film. Trains pass through the station daily as they turn around to head uptown, and passengers ride through the station, but the train does not stop and so they cannot disembark. During filming of the scene where the Turtles are trapped in the net and fall to the ground, one of the stuntmen broke an ankle. Some filming took place in North Carolina, like the first, where the New York City skyline was created at the North Carolina Film Studios. The building used for the entrance to April's apartment is the office of the New York location of Jim Henson's Creature Shop, which did the animatronics work for the film and its predecessor. The film is dedicated to the memory of Jim Henson, who had died the previous May.

== Music ==
An original motion picture soundtrack was released alongside the film in 1991 by SBK Records. The soundtrack featured 10 tracks from the film, and music from artists such as Magnificent V11, produced by Troy Duncombe and Mickey Mahoney of Cat and Moose productions, Ya Kid K, Cathy Dennis and David Morales, Tribal House and Dan Hartman. The most famous song featured on the soundtrack is "Ninja Rap" performed by rapper Vanilla Ice and written by Frank Miller. The song featured prominently, and Ice makes an appearance as himself. This song tricked the audience into believing the fight was a harmless "show" and thus not to panic. A music video was produced for "Ninja Rap".

The soundtrack features two original pieces from the Orchestra On the Half Shell. The original music was composed by John Du Prez, who won a BMI Film Music Award for his work.

== Reception ==
=== Box office ===
The Secret of the Ooze was released in theaters on March 22, 1991, in the United States, and subsequently in other countries from June through to August. The film was number one in North America on its first weekend of release, taking in over US$20 million, and eventually making $78.7 million in total, generating theatrical rentals of $41.9 million. The film was a success at the U.S. and Canadian box office, but made less than the first film, becoming the second highest-grossing independent film ever, behind the original. Overseas, the film did not do so well, with 20th Century Fox acquiring the foreign rights for $25 million but the film only earning them rentals of $12 million. In total, the film had worldwide rentals of $54 million.

Like its predecessor, the sequel was censored in the UK due to usage of forbidden weapons (the nunchaku), such as during the opening credits sequence where Michelangelo imitates their use by swinging a pair of sausages. The edits were waived for the DVD release in 2002. The German version was not censored visually; as with the first film, funny cartoon sound effects were added to the fight scenes to soften the violence.

In March 2026, the film was theatrically re-released by Fathom Entertainment for its 35th anniversary. During the March 13 to March 15, 2026 weekend, the film made $1.5 million at the box office, finishing in ninth place.

=== Critical response ===
The second film received mixed reviews from critics. On Rotten Tomatoes, the film has a rating of 37% based on reviews from 43 critics, with the consensus: "Not only is the movie's juvenile dialogue unbearable for adults, but the turtles' dopey and casual attitude towards physical violence makes them poor kids' role models". On Metacritic, the film has a score of 45 out of 100 based on reviews from 20 critics, indicating "mixed or average reviews".

Dave Kehr of The Chicago Sun Times calls the film "a fast, funny, engagingly unpretentious 88 minutes that, moving between martial-arts dustups and random satirical jibes, achieves a more successful mix of action and humor than the first. There is plenty for adults here as well as children".

Janet Maslin of The New York Times noted that "the Turtles fight less, clown more and stray too far from their beloved sewers" and called it an improvement, and was relieved that they had at least made a mainstream movie. Maslin stated that the Turtles "clean up their act" in the movie and also praised Secret of the Ooze for containing scenes referencing then-growing popular culture trends which were considered major competitors to the TMNT franchise's "greatest assets," such as rap music and Bart Simpson. Lloyd Bradley of Empire gave the film three out of five stars, saying, "This lacks the darkness and subtlety that makes the first film so good, and so adult, but its simplified plot and gags will appeal to the under tens".

Gene Siskel at The Chicago Tribune was just as unimpressed by this film as the first, calling it "a martial-arts movie in rubber uniforms". Siskel considers that he is an adult "forgetting the sort of mindless entertainment that he himself enjoyed as a child" but rejects the idea and calls the fight scenes "more depressing than joyful". Roger Ebert of The Chicago Sun Times complains that the Turtles look essentially the same, and suggests they are an "emblem of our drab and dreary times" and that they are "an example of the hazards of individuality". He says kids are getting a bad deal and compared to the comic book heroes he grew up with they are being robbed of "a sense of wonder".

== Toys ==
The Teenage Mutant Ninja Turtles franchise was arguably at the height of its popularity around the time that The Secret of the Ooze was released in theaters. A number of tie-ins were brought out alongside the release of the film. A new line of toys were introduced for the release of the film, including "Movie Star" toys of all four Turtles, with the box art depicting stills from the film, and a cartoon rendition of the turtles gathered around a canister of ooze in the top right corner of the package. In contrast to the usual Turtles' figures, the film series figures were softer and more rubbery, to better reflect the look of the animatronic costumes used in the films. They featured ball joints at the neck, shoulders, and hips, and each figure came with a small, plastic canister with a sticker of "ooze" wrapped around them. An official film adaptation was also released by Eastman and Laird.

Figurines of Super Shredder, Tokka and Rahzar were also available, though they were not as closely aligned to the film as the four turtles were. The Playmates company produced the figurines. The Turtles franchise had by now also immersed itself into the food industry, with characters from the franchise appearing on numerous food products. Royal Gelatin Desserts adapted the "Ooze" name into their product, and featured the Turtles on the packages. The boxes included various recipes involving ooze in some form.

== Sequel ==
A third film, titled Teenage Mutant Ninja Turtles III, was released 1993 to a smaller box office take and is the final of the original trilogy.

== Home media ==
The film was originally released on VHS in North America on July 31, 1991. It sold 5 million units.

The film was later released on DVD in Region 1 on 3 September 2002; it contained only minor special features and interactive menus.

On 4 August 2009, the film was included in a special 25th-anniversary boxset, released to both DVD and Blu-ray formats. It contains Teenage Mutant Ninja Turtles, Teenage Mutant Ninja Turtles II, Teenage Mutant Ninja Turtles III, and the animated release, TMNT (2007).

In December 2025, Arrow Video released the film on both 4K Ultra HD Blu-ray and Blu-ray formats, along with the first and third ones in the United Kingdom, the United States and Canada.
