= Todd W. Langen =

American screenwriter

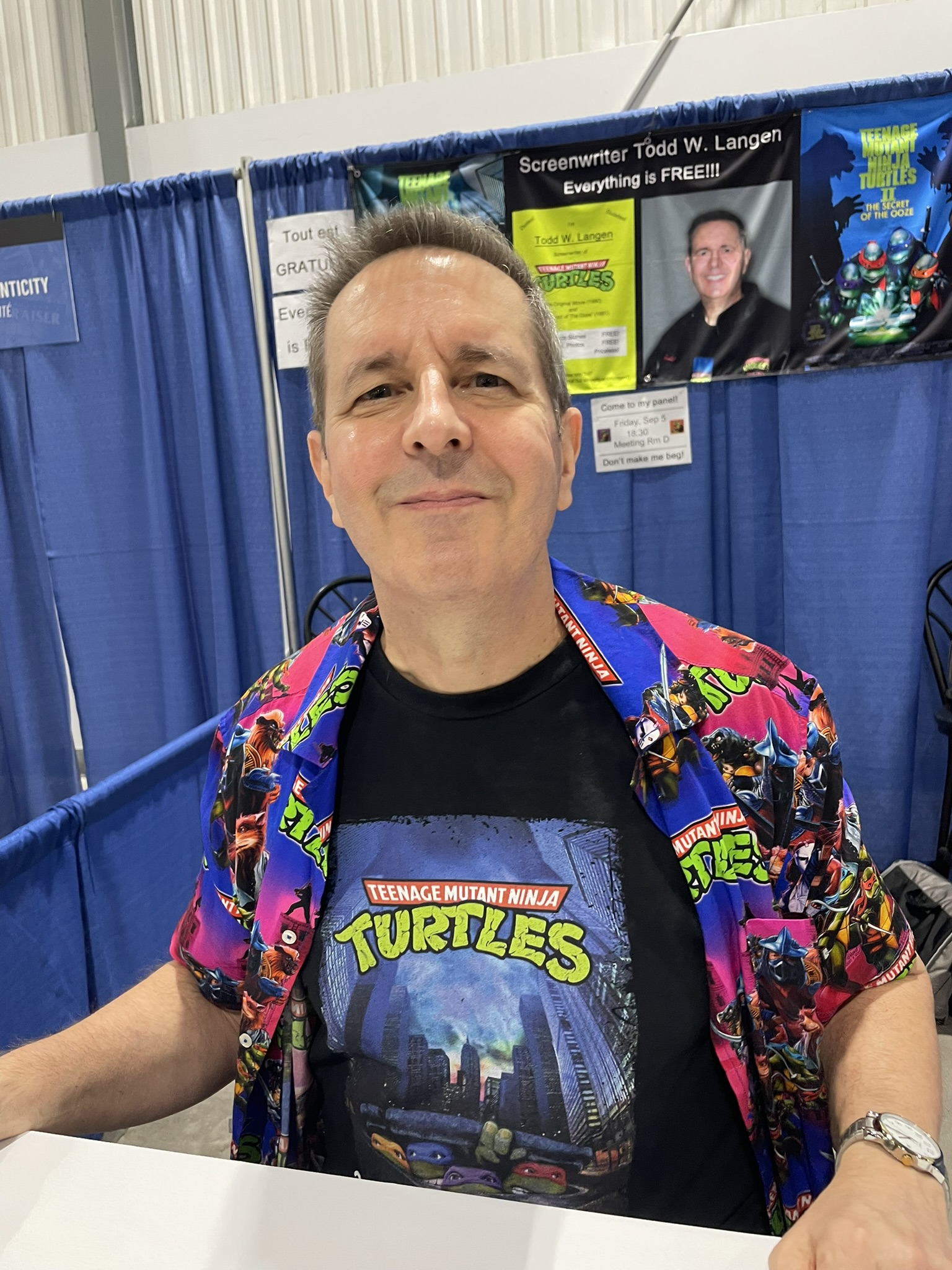
- Langen in 2025
- Born: Detroit, Michigan, US
- Works: Teenage Mutant Ninja Turtles; Teenage Mutant Ninja Turtles II: The Secret of the Ooze

Todd W. Langen is an American screenwriter and former engineer, known for his work on the first two live-action Teenage Mutant Ninja Turtles movies.

== Career ==
Langen was born in Detroit and earned a master's degree in aerospace engineering from the University of Michigan. He decided to become a screenwriter at 30 years old, while working on a space shuttle for Hughes Aircraft Company. His first sale was an episode for the short-lived television series Pursuit of Happiness. He soon became a regular writer of The Wonder Years.

Langen was hired to work on the 1990 film Teenage Mutant Ninja Turtles, originally written by Bobby Herbeck. Langen was called in to perform a complete revision on the script, known as a "Page One rewrite". Langen and Herbeck did not work together and did not meet until the film released. He is listed first in the credits. Langen returned to write the sequel in 1991.

== Awards ==
- Writers Guild of America Award for Television: Episodic Comedy for an episode of The Wonder Years.
