= Bobby Herbeck =

Actor

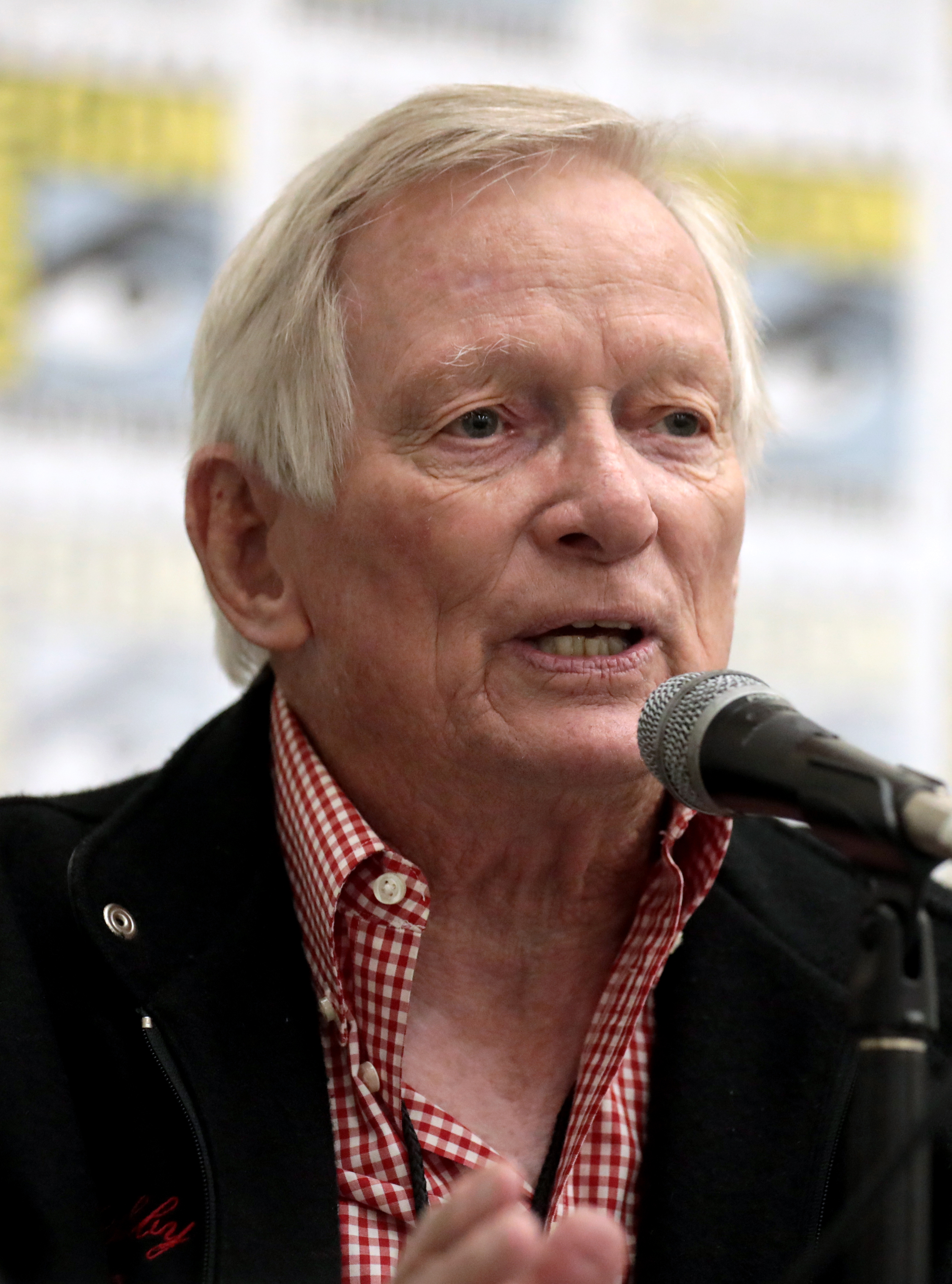
- Herbeck at the 2021 San Diego Comic-Con
- Born: Robert William Herbeck; 28 January 1945; Los Angeles, California
- Occupations: Actor, producer, screenwriter
- Years active: 1969–present
- Notable work: Teenage Mutant Ninja Turtles

Robert William Herbeck is an actor, film producer and screenwriter, known for writing the first Teenage Mutant Ninja Turtles film.

== Career ==
=== Actor ===
Herbeck had a television acting career in the 1970s and 1980s. His roles were credited in several television series including Mash, CHiPs Diff'rent Strokes, and The Jeffersons (11x10).

=== Producer ===
In 1998 Herbeck was listed as a co-producer on the Warner Brothers movie Wrongfully Accused.

=== Writer ===
Herbeck was a comedy writer when he came up with the idea of creating a Teenage Mutant Ninja Turtles film in 1988. The film had a 25 Million dollar opening weekend which surprised many Hollywood insiders.

Herbeck wrote the first screenplay of Teenage Mutant Ninja Turtles. Screenwriter Todd W. Langen was called in to do a "Page One rewrite," that is, a complete revision based on a screenplay that a studio had deemed interesting but unworkable as submitted. Langen and Herbeck did not work together and did not meet until the film opened. Langen is credited first.

==== Lawsuit ====
In 2015 Herbeck and others filed a 3 million dollar lawsuit against the Franchise rights holder (Fortune Star Media) for the Teenage Mutant Ninja Turtles. The writers and the directors claimed Fortune Star Media would not pay them. Herbeck claimed that Fortune Star Media owed him $250,000.
