= Teenage Mutant Ninja Turtles (2014 film) =

Film by Jonathan Liebesman

- Theatrical release poster
- Directed by: Jonathan Liebesman
- Written by: Josh Appelbaum; André Nemec; Evan Daugherty
- Based on: Teenage Mutant Ninja Turtles by: Peter Laird; Kevin Eastman
- Produced by: Michael Bay; Andrew Form; Brad Fuller; Galen Walker; Scott Mednick; Ian Bryce
- Starring: Megan Fox; Will Arnett; William Fichtner; Danny Woodburn; Abby Elliott; Noel Fisher; Jeremy Howard; Pete Ploszek; Alan Ritchson
- Cinematography: Lula Carvalho
- Edited by: Joel Negron; Glen Scantlebury
- Music by: Brian Tyler
- Production companies: Paramount Pictures; Nickelodeon Movies; Platinum Dunes; Gama Entertainment; Mednick Productions; Heavy Metal
- Distributed by: Paramount Pictures
- Release dates: July 29, 2014 (Mexico City premiere); August 8, 2014 (United States)
- Running time: 101 minutes
- Country: United States
- Language: English
- Budget: $125–150 million
- Box office: $485 million

Teenage Mutant Ninja Turtles is a 2014 American superhero film directed by Jonathan Liebesman and written by Josh Appelbaum, André Nemec, and Evan Daugherty. Based on the characters of the same name created by Peter Laird and Kevin Eastman, it is a reboot of the Teenage Mutant Ninja Turtles film series. The film stars Megan Fox, Will Arnett, William Fichtner, Danny Woodburn, Abby Elliott, Noel Fisher, Jeremy Howard, Pete Ploszek, and Alan Ritchson, with the voices of Johnny Knoxville and Tony Shalhoub. The plot follows the Turtles, who, with the help of their ally April O'Neil, face the warlord Shredder and his Foot Clan, as well as protect their New York City home.

The film was announced shortly before Laird sold the rights to the characters to Nickelodeon in October 2009. In late May 2010, Paramount Pictures and Nickelodeon Movies brought Michael Bay and his Platinum Dunes partners Andrew Form and Brad Fuller on to produce the film. Liebesman began negotiations to direct in early 2012. The screenplay went through numerous rewrites, with Applebaum, Nemec, and Daugherty ultimately getting final credit. Principal photography began in March 2013, in Tupper Lake, New York, and production concluded in August 2013.

Teenage Mutant Ninja Turtles premiered on July 29, 2014 in Mexico City, and was released in theaters on August 8, 2014. The film received generally negative reviews from critics, with criticism aimed at its screenplay and characterisations. It became a box office success, grossing $485 million against a $125–150 million budget, becoming the highest-grossing film in the franchise, as well as the highest-grossing film from Nickelodeon Movies. A sequel, Out of the Shadows, followed in 2016 to slightly better reviews, but it failed to match the first film's box-office gross.

== Plot ==
In New York State, news reporter April O'Neil investigates a crime wave by a group of criminals called the Foot Clan. At a dock at night, she sees the Foot raiding cargo containers. After an unseen vigilante attacks the thieves, April notices a symbol left behind. April's supervisor Bernadette Thompson and her coworkers are oblivious to her story. Later, while covering a charity event thrown by Sacks Industries, April expresses gratitude to the company's CEO Eric Sacks, who was her late father's lab partner.

Frustrated by the vigilante, the Clan's leader Shredder has the Foot Soldiers take hostages at a subway station in order to draw him out. April, at the scene, becomes a hostage herself. Four mysterious figures arrive, take out the Clan, and free the hostages. April follows them to a rooftop and realizes that the vigilantes are anthropomorphic mutant turtles, causing her to pass out in shock. When she regains consciousness, they advise her not to tell anyone of their existence. As they leave, April hears Leonardo and Raphael's names.

April returns to her apartment and remembers "Project Renaissance", her father's science experiment, which involved four turtles named Leonardo, Donatello, Raphael, Michelangelo, and a mutated rat called Splinter. Unable to convince Bernadette of the Turtles' existence, April is dismissed. Her coworker Vern Fenwick drives her to Sacks' estate where she confides in him about her discovery. Sacks believes her and reveals that he and April's father had been experimenting on a mutagen created to cure disease, which was thought lost in the fire that killed her dad.

At Splinter's behest, the Turtles bring April to their sewer lair. Splinter explains how April had saved them all from the fire and freed them into the sewer. The mutagen caused the five of them to grow and develop humanoid attributes. Splinter took on the role of their father, using April's father as an example. After finding a book on Ninjutsu in a storm drain, he proceeded to teach himself, then the Turtles, the fighting style. When April reveals she told Sacks about her discovery of the Turtles, Splinter informs her that Sacks was practically raised by the Shredder and works with him.

Then, Shredder and the Foot Soldiers attack the lair, defeating Splinter and incapacitating Raphael while the other Turtles are captured. April comes out of hiding and she and Raphael plan to save the others. At Sacks' estate, he has the Turtles' blood drained in order to create an antidote to a deadly virus that Sacks hopes to flood New York with, believing he will become rich from people seeking his cure. Raphael, April, and Vern storm the estate and free the other Turtles. The group then escapes the compound in pursuit of Sacks.

On a radio tower in the city, Sacks and Shredder plant a device that will flood the city with the virus while Sacks is preparing to convert the mutagen into a healing serum. Sacks reveals to April that he killed her father. April and Vern subdue Sacks in the lab, while the Turtles are battling Shredder on the roof. During the fight, the tower's support beams collapse. As the turtles try to keep it from falling and infecting the city, April confronts Shredder with the mutagen. In the struggle, the tower collapses and the Turtles pull April onto it with them, while Shredder falls to the street and is captured by the police. Believing they are about to die, the Turtles confess their secrets, while Raphael gives an impassioned speech about his love for his brothers before they land harmlessly on the street. They vanish before the humans find them and return to the sewers, where they give Splinter the mutagen and he begins to recover.

Sometime later, April meets with Vern, who tries and fails to ask her on a date. The Turtles appear in a special modified "Turtle Van", and Michelangelo accidentally blows up Vern's new car with a rocket. As the police respond to the explosion, the Turtles leave, but not before Mikey tries to serenade April with "Happy Together" by the band The Turtles, much to his brothers' annoyance and April's amusement.

== Cast ==
- Megan Fox as April O'Neil, a reporter for Channel 6 News. Malina Weissman plays the younger April.
- Pete Ploszek (motion-capture) and Johnny Knoxville (voice) as Leonardo, the leader and oldest member of the Ninja Turtles. Ploszek initially voiced Leonardo for the film but Knoxville was later brought on to dub Ploszek's voice. Ploszek would later return to do the voice of Leonardo in The sequel.
- Alan Ritchson (motion-capture/voice) as Raphael, the strongest member of the Ninja Turtles.
- Jeremy Howard (motion-capture/voice) as Donatello, the most intelligent member of the Ninja Turtles.
- Noel Fisher (motion-capture/voice) as Michelangelo, the most childish and youngest of the Ninja Turtles, who has a crush on April.
- Danny Woodburn (motion-capture) / Tony Shalhoub (voice) as Splinter, a mutant rat who is the adoptive father and sensei of the Ninja Turtles.
- Tohoru Masamune as the Shredder, the turtles's enemy.
- William Fichtner as Eric Sacks, CEO of Sacks Industries with ties to the Foot Clan.
- Will Arnett as Vern Fenwick, April's co-worker, who has a crush on her.

The film also features Minae Noji as Karai, Whoopi Goldberg as Bernadette Thompson, April's boss, Abby Elliott as Taylor, April's roommate, K. Todd Freeman as Baxter Stockman, and Paul Fitzgerald as Dr. O'Neil, April's deceased father. Other Channel 6 news employees include Jim McNaughton (portrayed by Taran Killam), and Mr. Rivetti (portrayed by Chance Kelly). Co-creator Kevin Eastman has a cameo appearance as a doctor for Sacks Industries.

== Production ==
=== Development ===
In October 2009, following the news of Nickelodeon purchasing all of Mirage Studios' rights to the Teenage Mutant Ninja Turtles property, Nickelodeon announced plans to produce a new film through corporate sibling Paramount Pictures with an expected release date sometime in 2012. In late May 2010, Paramount and Nickelodeon had brought Michael Bay and his Platinum Dunes partners Andrew Form and Brad Fuller on to produce the next film that would reboot the film series. For the script, the studio originally hired Art Marcum and Matt Holloway to write the film. A year later, the studio turned to writers Josh Appelbaum and André Nemec to rewrite the script. In February 2012, Jonathan Liebesman began negotiations to direct the film, beating out Brett Ratner. Later in March, Paramount pushed back the film's release date to Christmas Day 2013. In early March 2012, Bay revealed at Nickelodeon's 2012 upfront presentation that the film will be simply titled Ninja Turtles and that the turtles would be "from an alien race". News of Bay's creative change was met with criticism from within the fan community.

In response to the announcement, actor Robbie Rist, who voiced Michelangelo in the first three films, wrote to Bay accusing him of "sodomizing" the franchise. Rist later remarked that he could have been out of line since Bay makes more money than he does. In response to the feedback, Bay issued a statement asking fans to calm down since a script had not been revealed, his team was working closely with the creators, and would include all the elements that made them fans to begin with. Both Brian Tochi, who voiced Leonardo in the first three films, and Judith Hoag, who played April O'Neil in the 1990 film, have voiced their support towards the creative change. Teenage Mutant Ninja Turtles co-creator Peter Laird expressed his thoughts on the change asking fans to take Bay's advice and wait until more of Bay's plan is made available. Laird also stated that he felt the "ill-conceived plan" could be a "genius notion", as it would allow fans to have the multitude of bipedal anthropomorphic turtles that they have been asking for. He would point out that while the concept of a turtle-planet backstory made for a great run-of-the-mill science fiction story, it had no real place in the Ninja Turtles universe.

Teenage Mutant Ninja Turtles co-creator Kevin Eastman stated that he had been invited behind the scenes of the film, and concluded that he was officially on board with the project and that, although he could not say much, he believed it to be "awesome". Via Twitter, Corey Feldman, who voiced Donatello in the first and third films, voiced his support for the film saying that he loves Bay's remakes and he is eager to reprise his role. In response to the backlash, Liebesman stated that he was glad to hear about the fans' response, since he and Eastman had been locked in a room working on ideas that, from his own perspective as a fan, everybody would love. While he did not confirm whether or not Bay's comment did represent the film's premise, he did stress on the ooze itself and its background in the original comic, reminding that the ooze was the product of alien technology. In regards to how the Turtles would be rendered, Liebesman would not say exactly what visual direction would be taken, but he did state that he enjoyed Weta Digital's work in Rise of the Planet of the Apes. He also pointed out that the film was not to be exclusively about action but also to focus on brotherhood, friendship, and responsibility.

Bay posted on his website explaining the title change and stressing that nothing had changed regarding the Turtles. He also said the reason the title was shortened was a request by Paramount to make the title "simple". He continued that the Turtles were the same as fans remember and regardless of the title change they still act like teenagers. He urged everyone to give everybody who was involved a chance, as they had the fans' interest at top priority and would not let anybody down. Eastman revealed some more information about the film, stating that April would not be 16 years old like in the 2012 cartoon series, he feels Ken Watanabe would make a great Shredder, he would like to bring Reyes back as a Foot lieutenant, and martial arts wise they are looking at Fist of Legend and The Raid: Redemption. Eastman called it "easily the best Turtle movie yet". Kevin Eastman stated that the movie is creating its own story but has to be true to the source material or else they will get "murdered".

In August 2012, an early version of the script, dated January 30, titled "The Blue Door" and written by Appelbaum and Nemec, was leaked online. It featured major changes to the origins: the Turtles hail from another dimension that consists of turtle warriors, Splinter is an alien from the same dimension as well, Shredder is "Colonel Schrader", a government agent who is secretly an alien who can grow blades from his body, "The Foot Clan" is "The Foot", an elite Black Ops unit led by Col. Schrader, Casey Jones is an 18-year-old security guard/amateur ice hockey player that finds the Turtles and is the focus of the film, April is also 18 and is having relationship troubles with Casey because she is moving to New York City due to an internship at CBS, Raphael is the comic relief instead of Michelangelo, and Michelangelo falls in love with a turtle woman from his home planet. A cease and desist order was sent by Paramount Pictures to a website that was hosting the script. Peter Laird read the script and commented on his blog that "all true TMNT fans should be grateful to the new 'powers that be' that they did not allow this wretched thing to go any further". In response to The Blue Door, Bay stated that the draft had been written before he and Platinum Dunes joined the project and was promptly rejected sometime before. The filming started in April 2013 in New York. The studio pushed back the film's release date until June 6, 2014, and a new writer, Evan Daugherty, was brought on board, but Paramount postponed the release date again to August 8, 2014, in order to avoid competition with family-friendly films released in June as well as one of Paramount and Michael Bay's other releases, Transformers: Age of Extinction.

=== Casting ===
Megan Fox was cast as April O'Neil in February 2013, marking her first collaboration with Bay since her remark comparing him to Adolf Hitler in response to Bay's treatment of her during filming of Transformers: Revenge of the Fallen. Bay had confirmed Fox was back on good terms with him as early as April 2011. Jessica Biel had expressed interest in playing the part. In regards to Fox's casting, Laird commented that he felt there were better choices to play April, but that he would prefer not to get too worked up over the issue.

Alan Ritchson, Pete Ploszek, Jeremy Howard, and Noel Fisher were cast as Raphael, Leonardo, Donatello, and Michelangelo respectively the following month. In early April, Will Arnett was cast in a role that was being kept secret until leaked photos revealed that he had been cast as April's cameraman and rival, Vern Fenwick. Soon after that, actor Danny Woodburn joined the cast as Splinter.

In early May, William Fichtner was cast in the film as "a lead with iconic stature in the Turtles' mythology", marking his third collaboration with Bay following Armageddon and Pearl Harbor. His character was revealed to be named "Eric Sacks", an Anglicized version of Oroku Saki / The Shredder. At this point in production Sacks was intended to be the film's version of the Shredder, but that idea was subsequently abandoned in favor of casting actor Tohoru Masamune as an authentically Japanese incarnation of the character following widespread whitewashing accusations. The movie underwent reshoots to change this element of the plot, with Sacks being changed to the Shredder's adopted son, although the film's tie-in video game would retain Sacks as the Shredder.

Also in May, former Saturday Night Live star Abby Elliott was cast in the film. Also, Whoopi Goldberg appeared on set, portraying Bernadette Thompson, a female version of Burne Thompson. William Fichtner revealed that Bebop and Rocksteady would not be appearing in the film, who appeared later in the sequel. Abby Elliott played April O'Neil's roommate, named as Taylor. Other actors Johnny Knoxville and Tony Shalhoub joined the film to dub Ploszek and Woodburn as the voices of Leonardo and Splinter respectively.

=== Filming ===
Principal photography commenced on March 22, 2013, in Tupper Lake, New York. Shooting began in April in New York City and at Jones Beach State Park in Wantagh on Long Island, New York under the code words "four squared" (4SQ). On April 20, the film was renamed Teenage Mutant Ninja Turtles. Michael Bay retracted comments that the turtles would be aliens. Early set photos were made public showing the turtles' actors in black and grey motion capture suits, complete with life-sized turtle shells, with each actor wearing armbands and accents of their corresponding turtle's signature color. Cinematographer Lula Carvalho, who was invited to work in the film during production of the 2014 remake of RoboCop, described the process as "demanding much imagination and participation of the visual effects supervisor", given that despite their presence on the set the actors would effectively be replaced by computer-generated creatures. Production for the film wrapped on August 6, 2013. Additional filming occurred in January and April 2014.

According to co-star Alan Ritchson, who played Raphael, he expressed displeasure with various production issues during filming. At first, Ritchson was not sure about playing Raphael because he did not wish to play a motion-capture character, but the promise of career advancement by producers at Paramount, and the thought of pleasing his son, a huge fan of the franchise, convinced him to accept the part. The TMNT actors were then not given the same special treatments as their live-action co-stars Megan Fox and Will Arnett and often seemed to be mistreated and afterthought by most of the producers and Paramount Pictures during and after filming of both movies, not allowing many opportunities to do press for the picture and were not invited to the premiere as promised and instructed them to not give press interviews while claiming they (the turtles) were the ones refusing to give interviews but denying saying they wanted interviews. Ritchson personally emailed Brad Grey many times about the situation saying he did not want to return as Raphael after having an unhappy experience making the first movie, but was bound by his contract to do so.

=== Visual effects ===
The visual effects of Teenage Mutant Ninja Turtles were handled by Industrial Light & Magic (ILM), who had previously worked with Bay and Nickelodeon, doing the visual effects for The Island, the Transformers film series, Lemony Snicket's A Series of Unfortunate Events, The Spiderwick Chronicles, The Last Airbender, and the animation for the 2011 film Rango. To ensure the digital turtles had more nuanced facial expressions, the technicians employed a new motion capture system that captured the actors' faces with two high-definition cameras, capturing roughly 1 terabyte of data per day. Along with a more realistic design, the effects artists wanted the Ninja Turtles to be "charming, intimidating and individually recognizable". Thus, each had a distinctive body figure resembling their personalities and physicality. According to effects supervisor Pablo Helman, "Donatello is more like a basketball player, Raph is more like a football player and Mikey is a very short Messi and plays soccer".

== Music ==
The film's score was composed by Brian Tyler. The soundtrack was released by Atlantic Records on August 5, 2014. Prior to that, a single to promote the film and separate from the album titled "Shell Shocked" by Juicy J, Wiz Khalifa, and Ty Dolla $ign, and featuring Kill the Noise and Tyler (credited as Madsonik) was released on July 22, 2014.

== Release ==
=== Theatrical ===
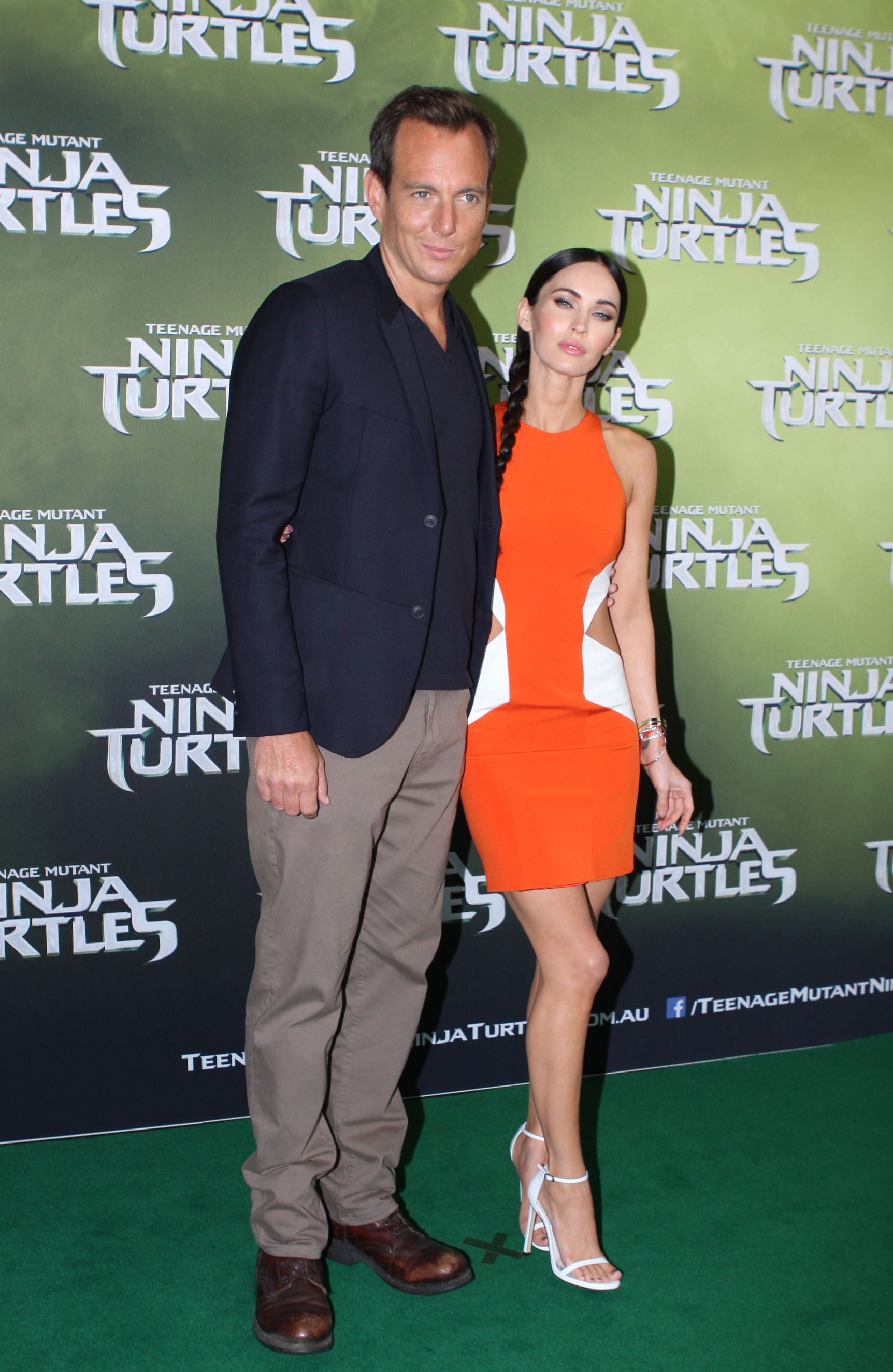
Will Arnett and Megan Fox at a Special Event Screening of the film in Sydney

The release date was moved around several times until it was set for August 8, 2014. The film premiered on July 29 in Mexico City. Premiere events also occurred in Los Angeles and New York City. On September 12, the film was released in IMAX 3D for a one-week limited engagement.

=== Marketing ===
A teaser trailer for the film was shown at Cinema Con on March 24, 2014, before its public release on March 27. The trailer reached over 31.4 million views on YouTube in its first week. On April 13, the first TV spot for the movie was released. A second version of the teaser trailer was released on April 30. Footage of the film was shown at CineEurope with an introduction from Megan Fox. Playmates Toys produced a new product line of toys based entirely on the film, including action figures, vehicles and role-play gear.

Nickelodeon Consumer Products also announced a complete merchandise lineup of movie-based products that will be available in all major retailers from July 2014 through the holiday season. Paramount released a new trailer which includes the single "Reptile's Theme Song" by Skrillex.

On July 7, Pizza Hut announced a new advertising campaign for the film, which included the return of the chain's Cheesy Bites Pizza, social media contests themed around the film, and a television advertisement featuring the new movie incarnations of the characters. Four motion posters of the turtles were released and new TV spot debuted that day as well.

An extended behind-the-scenes featurette was shown after the 2014 Kids' Choice Sports. An extended TV spot debuted the following day. Paramount promoted the film on July 24 at 2014 San Diego Comic-Con. Five new TV spots were released that day as well.

The music video for the song, "Shell Shocked" debuted on July 28. Pentatonix released a new song titled "We Are Ninjas" and a music video as part of the promotion for the film on August 4.

==== Controversy ====
In Australia, a poster was released which featured the four turtles jumping from an exploding skyscraper as a promotion for its September 11 release. The poster sparked controversy due to the film’s release date and the resemblance to the September 11 attacks. Paramount apologized and removed the poster.

=== Home media ===
Teenage Mutant Ninja Turtles was released on Digital HD on November 25, 2014, and was released on DVD and Blu-ray (2D and 3D) on December 16, 2014. The film topped the home video sales charts in its first week and achieved the highest ratio of disc sales to theatrical tickets sales its first week in stores. It retained the top spot on the home video sales chart in its second weekend. Overall, Teenage Mutant Ninja Turtles was the eighth best-selling film of 2014 with 3.6 million units sold and earning a revenue of $79.8 million from home video sales. The film was made available to MGM+ on December 17, 2014. The film was released on 4K Ultra HD Blu-ray on July 25, 2023.

== Reception ==
=== Box office ===
Teenage Mutant Ninja Turtles grossed $191.2 million in North America and $293.8 million in other countries for a worldwide total of $485 million, against a budget of $125 million. Deadline Hollywood calculated the net profit of the film to be $81.3 million, when factoring together all expenses and revenues. It is the highest-grossing film in the Turtles franchise, as well as the highest-grossing film produced by Nickelodeon Movies.

On its opening day, the film grossed $25.6 million, including $4.6 million from Thursday night showings. In its first weekend, Teenage Mutant Ninja Turtles opened in first place with $65.6 million, which exceeded Paramount and box office analysts's predictions of a $40 to $45 million opening, and achieved the fourth highest weekend debut for the month of August, after Guardians of the Galaxy, The Bourne Ultimatum, and Rush Hour 2. The movie remained at the number one spot in its second weekend by grossing $28.5 million (down 56.5%), but slipped to number two for its third weekend (grossing $16.7 million, down 41.4%), as Guardians of the Galaxy reclaimed the top spot.

The film led the foreign box office during the weekend lasting from October 31 through November 2, 2014, by grossing $34.7 million ($26.5 million coming from China).

=== Critical response ===
On the review aggregator website Rotten Tomatoes, 20% of 163 critics' reviews are positive, with an average rating of 4.2/10. The website's consensus reads: "Neither entertaining enough to recommend nor remarkably awful, Teenage Mutant Ninja Turtles may bear the distinction of being the dullest movie ever made about talking bipedal reptiles." Metacritic, which uses a weighted average, assigned the film a score of 31 out of 100, based on 33 critics, indicating "generally unfavorable" reviews. Audiences polled by CinemaScore gave the film an average grade of "B" on a scale of A+ to F.

Sandie Angulo Chen of The Washington Post gave the film two out of four stars, saying "while this reboot is fun, it's also forgettable and occasionally infuriating". Joe Neumaier of the New York Daily News gave the film zero stars, saying "even youngsters may wonder why any hint of charm or fun has scurried away. Those new to the franchise may withdraw their head into their neck, turtle-like".

Rafer Guzman of Newsday gave the film two out of four stars: "Rougher and slightly funnier than the 1990 original, but still harmless junk at best". Peter Howell of the Toronto Star gave the film one and half stars out of four: "Not much of an effort is made to differentiate the personalities of the turtles, who all frankly look as grotesque as a Terry Gilliam cartoon". Nicolas Rapold of The New York Times said: "Attached to this movie, the title no longer sounds zany; it looks like a series of keywords".

Mark Olsen of the Los Angeles Times said that "there is something half-hearted about the entire film, as if those behind it were involved not because they wanted to make it, not because they should make it, but just because they could". Kyle Anderson of Entertainment Weekly gave the film a C+, saying "too-brief thrills only shine a harsher light on the film's laborious pacing and cringeworthy one-liners spilling from the maws of the ninja teens".

Nancy Churnin of The Dallas Morning News gave the film a B, writing: "The turtles (engagingly voiced by Alan Ritchson, Noel Fisher, Johnny Knoxville and Jeremy Howard) look terrific" and "the best part is that the film has heart". Justin Lowe of The Hollywood Reporter gave the film a positive review, writing "Liebesman relies on his genre-film resume to keep events moving at a brisk clip and the motion-capture process employed to facilitate live-action integration with cutting-edge VFX looks superior onscreen". Justin Chang of Variety said the film is "neither a particularly good movie nor the pop-cultural travesty that some were dreading". A.A. Dowd of The A.V. Club gave the film a C+: "What the new Teenage Mutant Ninja Turtles lacks is not fidelity, but a spirit of genuine boyish fun -- the sense that anyone involved saw more than a very specific shade of green in the freshly digital scales of these 30-year-old characters".

Soren Anderson of The Seattle Times gave the film one out of four stars: "If ever there was a movie that should not have been made, this is that movie". Drew Hunt of Chicago Reader wrote that "the light, comedic tone is weighed down by unimaginative pop-culture references and half-witted one-liners". Bill Goodykoontz of The Arizona Republic gave the film two out of five stars, saying: "It's just kind of a mess, as unfocused and immature as the four mutant turtles at its core. Stuff happens, stuff blows up and this is probably a good time to mention that Michael Bay produced the film". Alonso Duralde of The Wrap gave the film a negative review, writing "Teenage Mutant Ninja Turtles is a movie that takes its characters and its premise seriously, until it doesn't, and that operates at two speeds: tortoise (ponderous) and hare (head-spinning)".

Adam Graham of The Detroit News gave the film a B−: "There's enough turtle power to please kids and fans of the original series". Steven Rea of The Philadelphia Inquirer gave the film two out of four stars: "The kind of clichéd, misfit crimefighters-versus-demented villains scenario that Kevin Eastman and Peter Laird happily parodied when they came up with the original Teenage Mutant Ninja Turtles comic books way back in the 1980s". Tom Russo of The Boston Globe gave the film one and a half stars out of five, describing "the repartee, as ever, is weak. Even with all the extra layers of digital detail, it's still tough to keep these four straight".

Cliff Lee of The Globe and Mail gave the film one and a half stars out of four, writing "for having gone to the trouble of making a self-descriptive movie called Teenage Mutant Ninja Turtles, its producers seem ultimately unsure about its most basic concept". James Berardinelli of ReelViews gave the film one and a half stars out of four: "Teenage Mutant Ninja Turtles doesn't so much provide brainless enjoyment as it pummels the viewer into submission. "Shell-shocked" is a reasonable description of the experience". Chris Cabin of Slant Magazine gave the film one out of four stars: Teenage Mutant Ninja Turtles only leaves one with the dim afterglow of forced normalcy, of a film so overworked to ensure mass-market appeal that it loses the charming oddness and loose goofiness that has allowed these characters, and their "frothy" appeal, to endure".

=== Accolades ===
List of awards and nominations
Year	Award	Category	Recipients	Result
2015
2015	35th Golden Raspberry Awards	Worst Picture		Nominated
2015	35th Golden Raspberry Awards	Worst Prequel, Remake, Rip-off or Sequel		Nominated
2015	35th Golden Raspberry Awards	Worst Director	Jonathan Liebesman	Nominated
2015	35th Golden Raspberry Awards	Worst Screenplay	Josh Appelbaum, André Nemec and Evan Daugherty	Nominated
2015	35th Golden Raspberry Awards	Worst Supporting Actress	Megan Fox	Won
2015	2015 Kids' Choice Awards	Favorite Movie		Nominated
2015	2015 Kids' Choice Awards	Favorite Movie Actor	Will Arnett (also for The Lego Movie)	Nominated
2015	2015 Kids' Choice Awards	Favorite Movie Actress	Megan Fox	Nominated

== Video games ==
Activision released a Nintendo 3DS game developed by Magic Pockets based on the film on August 8, 2014, to coincide with the movie, in which William Fichtner's Eric Sacks (an Anglicised version of Oroku Saki) is depicted as the Shredder, as in the original cut of the 2014 film prior to reshoots changing Sacks into being the Shredder's adoptive son for the film's theatrical release, following post-test screening criticisms of whitewashing. A mobile game, also based on the film, was released on July 24.

== Sequel ==
Noel Fisher revealed in an interview that all four of the turtle actors have signed on for three films.

Liebesman and Fuller have confirmed that Casey Jones as well as Bebop and Rocksteady will appear in the sequels. There were also plans for Krang and Dimension X in the sequels as well. Shortly after the release of the film, Paramount announced that a sequel will be released on June 3, 2016, with Michael Bay returning as producer and Josh Appelbaum and André Nemec coming back as screenwriters and executive producers. Fox and Arnett returned in the sequel along with the character Shredder.

Dave Green, director of Earth to Echo, directed the sequel. Several new actors appeared in the sequel: Victoria's Secret's supermodel Alessandra Ambrosio was cast as herself and a love interest to Vern, also Los Angeles Clippers and Charlotte Hornets players DeAndre Jordan, Matt Barnes, JJ Redick, Austin Rivers and Spencer Hawes made cameos in the film. Stephen Amell has been cast as Casey Jones. Tyler Perry was cast as Baxter Stockman and Brian Tee portrayed Shredder in the sequel. Gary Anthony Williams and Stephen "Sheamus" Farrelly were cast as Bebop and Rocksteady respectively. Brittany Ishibashi also replaced Noji as Karai in the sequel. Johnny Knoxville did not return to voice Leonardo in the sequel as he was not asked to reprise the role. Instead, Pete Ploszek did both motion-capture and voice.
