= Teenage Mutant Ninja Turtles: Out of the Shadows =

2016 film by Dave Green

- Theatrical release poster
- Directed by: Dave Green
- Written by: Josh Appelbaum; André Nemec
- Based on: Teenage Mutant Ninja Turtles by: Peter Laird; Kevin Eastman
- Produced by: Michael Bay; Andrew Form; Brad Fuller; Galen Walker; Scott Mednick
- Starring: Megan Fox; Will Arnett; Laura Linney; Stephen Amell; Noel Fisher; Jeremy Howard; Pete Ploszek; Alan Ritchson; Tyler Perry; Brian Tee; Brad Garrett; Gary Anthony Williams; Sheamus
- Cinematography: Lula Carvalho
- Edited by: Jim May; Debra Neil-Fisher; Bob Ducsay
- Music by: Steve Jablonsky
- Production companies: Paramount Pictures; Nickelodeon Movies; Platinum Dunes; Gama Entertainment; Mednick Productions; Smithrowe Entertainment; China Movie Media Group; Alibaba Pictures
- Distributed by: Paramount Pictures
- Release dates: May 22, 2016 (Madison Square Garden); June 3, 2016 (United States)
- Running time: 112 minutes
- Countries: United States; China
- Language: English
- Budget: $135 million
- Box office: $246 million

Teenage Mutant Ninja Turtles: Out of the Shadows is a 2016 superhero film directed by Dave Green, and written by Josh Appelbaum and André Nemec. Based on the Teenage Mutant Ninja Turtles characters, it is the sequel to the 2014 Teenage Mutant Ninja Turtles film. The film stars Megan Fox, Will Arnett, Laura Linney, Stephen Amell, Noel Fisher, Jeremy Howard, Pete Ploszek, Alan Ritchson, Tyler Perry, Brad Garrett, Gary Anthony Williams, Brian Tee and Sheamus. The plot follows the Turtles as they attempt to stop a conspiracy plot by Shredder and Baxter Stockman to unleash an alien warlord named Krang.

Following the box office success of Teenage Mutant Ninja Turtles, Paramount Pictures and Nickelodeon Movies officially announced that a sequel was greenlit. Green began negotiations to direct the sequel in December 2014, taking over from Jonathan Liebesman, who directed the first film. Principal photography on the film began in April 2015, in New York City, and wrapped up in August 2015.

Out of the Shadows premiered at Madison Square Garden in New York City on May 22, 2016, was released in theaters in the United States on June 3, 2016. The film received mixed reviews from critics, but was considered an improvement over the first film. It was a box-office bomb, only grossing $246 million against a $135 million budget, resulting in a planned third film being scrapped in favor of an animated reboot, Mutant Mayhem, released in 2023. Another live-action film is planned to release in 2028.

== Plot ==
A year after stopping Shredder, (Note: As depicted in Teenage Mutant Ninja Turtles (2014).) which Vern Fenwick was mutually credited for, the Teenage Mutant Ninja Turtles are informed by April O'Neil that scientist Baxter Stockman is working for Shredder and plans to bust him out of prison. As the Shredder is transferred between prisons alongside Bebop and Rocksteady by corrections officer Casey Jones, the Foot Clan attacks their convoy. Despite the Turtles' interference, Shredder escapes when Stockman uses a teleportation device. Shredder is hijacked mid-teleport, winds up in another dimension, and meets the alien warlord Krang, who reveals his plans to invade Earth. He gives Shredder a mutagenic compound in exchange for reassembling the arc capacitor, a device that he sent to Earth long ago which will open a portal to his dimension, a portal through which he will bring to earth his powerful war machine, the Technodrome. Shredder and Stockman already have the first piece and must collect the other two. Casey tells NYPD chief Rebecca Vincent and his superior what happened to Shredder, but is met with disbelief before they effectively suspend him, and decides to go after Shredder on his own.

Shredder recruits Bebop and Rocksteady, and Stockman uses Krang's mutagen to transform them into a humanoid warthog and rhinoceros, respectively. April witnesses their transformation and steals the remaining mutagen vial from the TCRI lab. Pursued by the Foot, she is rescued by Casey, who later meets the Turtles, but the vial is taken into police custody. In the lair, Donatello deduces that the mutagen could be used to turn the Turtles into humans, but Leonardo refuses and orders Donnie to keep it a secret from the others. However, Michelangelo overhears and tells Raphael, which enrages Raph and leads to a fierce argument between him and Leo. Raph then recruits Mikey, April, Casey, and Vern to break into the NYPD headquarters and retrieve the mutagen, but the Foot arrives ahead of them. In the ensuing battle, the turtles' existence is revealed to the police, who start a manhunt for them, and April and Casey are arrested while helping the brothers escape with the mutagen.

After recovering the second component of the machine, Bebop and Rocksteady go to the rainforests of Manaus, for the final component. The turtles follow them and board Bebop and Rocksteady's jet in midair. In the resulting battle, the jet is critically damaged after Rocksteady inadvertently fires a tank-mounted Mark 19 grenade launcher, and crashes into a river, though Bebop and Rocksteady are ultimately able to escape with the component. Shredder and Stockman complete the device and open a portal to Krang's dimension through which the Technodrome begins to emerge; Shredder then betrays Stockman by having his men take him to their headquarters in Tokyo. When entering the Technodrome, Krang likewise betrays Shredder, freezing him and locking him with his collection of other defeated foes.

Unable to reach the Technodrome as the police are searching for them, the Turtles debate over taking the mutagen to become human and fight openly. While Leo agrees, Raph shatters the vial. Upon April's request, Vern recovers the security footage from a hidden TCRI camera that proves Stockman and the Shredder's collaboration, and secures April and Casey's release. April arranges a meeting between the Turtles and Vincent, and convinces her that they are not enemies. With the help of the police, the Turtles are able to jump from the Chrysler Building and confront Krang aboard the still-assembling Technodrome. Krang is defeated when Donnie short circuits his robotic body. April, Casey, and Vern raid the Foot Clan facility, defeat Bebop, Rocksteady and the Shredder's lieutenant Karai and take control of the device. The Turtles are able to hurl the ship's beacon back through the portal, taking Krang and the rest of the Technodrome with it, as April, Casey, and Vern shut the portal down.

Bebop and Rocksteady are back in custody, while Stockman remains at large. The Turtles are honored by Vincent and the NYPD along with April, Casey, and Vern before Vincent offers to introduce the Turtles to the public, but they prefer to keep their existence a secret while still helping as they always have. On top of the Statue of Liberty, the Turtles celebrate their victory over the vanquished Krang.

== Cast ==
- Megan Fox as April O'Neil: A reporter for Channel 6 News who had befriended the turtles in the previous film, who now helps them fight the released Shredder and his allies.
- Stephen Amell as Casey Jones: A corrections officer turned vigilante who wears a hockey-mask and wields a hockey stick as a weapon. He eventually meets and befriends the turtles and April.
- Pete Ploszek as Leonardo: The leader and oldest of the turtles who wields a pair of katana in battle. Unlike the first film, Ploszek also voices the character, who had previously been voiced by Johnny Knoxville in the first film.
- Alan Ritchson as Raphael: The strong brother who wields a pair of sai in battle.
- Jeremy Howard as Donatello: The smart brother known for his scientific and technological expertise who builds equipment and machinery for the turtles and who wields a bo-staff in battle.
- Noel Fisher as Michelangelo: The youngest brother known for his pranks and jokes and who wields a pair of nunchucks in battle.
- Brian Tee as The Shredder: The leader of the Foot Clan who now seeks revenge on the turtles and allies with Krang. He was previously portrayed by Tohoru Masamune in the first film.
- Brad Garrett as Krang: A ruthless extraterrestrial life-form equipped with a robotic prototype body, who seeks to destroy Earth and enslave the universe.
- Peter D. Badalamenti (motion-capture) and Tony Shalhoub (voice) as Splinter: The adoptive father and sensei of the turtles. His motion-capture was previously performed by Danny Woodburn in the first film.
- Laura Linney as Police Chief Rebecca Vincent: the chief of NYPD who initially detests but later allies with the turtles in saving New York City.
- Tyler Perry as Dr. Baxter Stockman: A mad scientist and former worker at Sacks Industries who allies with Shredder in the latter's aims to take over New York City. He was previously portrayed by K. Todd Freeman in the first film.
- Gary Anthony Williams as Anton "Bebop" Zeck: A criminal partner of Rocksteady who was genetically mutated into an anthropomorphic warthog. Williams additionally portrays the character's pre-mutated form.
- Stephen "Sheamus" Farrelly as Owen "Rocksteady" Rocksteed: A criminal partner of Bebop who was genetically mutated into an anthropomorphic rhinoceros. Sheamus additionally portrays the character's pre-mutated form.
- Will Arnett as Vern "The Falcon" Fenwick: April's cameraman and friend who is revealed to have somehow taken credit for the turtles' actions in saving New York City. He assists the turtles in stopping Shredder once again.
- Brittany Ishibashi as Karai: Shredder's daughter and second in-command. She was previously portrayed by Minae Noji in the first film.

Dean Winters appears as a bartender. Supermodel Alessandra Ambrosio has a cameo appearance. NBA players Carmelo Anthony, DeAndre Jordan, Lou Amundson, JJ Redick, Austin Rivers, Matt Barnes and Spencer Hawes also made cameos in the film. Series co-creator Kevin Eastman makes a cameo appearance as a pizza delivery man named after himself in the film's opening. Jill Martin also made a cameo appearance in the basketball scene in the film. Judith Hoag, who previously played April O'Neil in the 1990 film, appeared in a cameo as Rita, April's boss, in a deleted scene. Jane Wu plays Jade, a police officer.

== Production ==
=== Development ===
After the 2014 film exceeded box office expectations, Paramount Pictures and Nickelodeon Movies officially announced a sequel was greenlit, and set to be released in theatres on June 3, 2016, with plans to incorporate the characters Casey Jones and Bebop and Rocksteady. Jonathan Liebesman and Bradley Fuller were also interested in doing a storyline that involved Dimension X and Krang. Dave Green began negotiations to direct the sequel in December 2014, replacing Liebesman. Known briefly as Teenage Mutant Ninja Turtles: Half Shell, Paramount revealed that the title had officially been changed to Teenage Mutant Ninja Turtles: Out of the Shadows.

=== Casting ===
Megan Fox and Will Arnett returned as April O'Neil and Vern Fenwick respectively; also confirmed were the Shredder's return, and Bebop and Rocksteady debut in the movie. In an interview, William Fichtner stated that he would be returning as Eric Sacks, but for unknown reasons, he ultimately did not appear in the final film. However, he could have returned for the third installment, considering he (along with the turtle actors, Noel Fisher, Jeremy Howard, Alan Ritchson and Pete Ploszek) signed on for three TMNT films at the time. Production was confirmed to start in April 2015, along with the casting of Alessandra Ambrosio, and several members of the Los Angeles Clippers. Stephen Amell was cast as Casey Jones, after test reading alongside several different actors. Amell acknowledged the character bore similarities to his Oliver Queen from Arrow. He stated the characters are "fundamentally different" from one another, but that Casey did resemble Oliver from older versions. Tyler Perry was cast as scientist Baxter Stockman, replacing K. Todd Freeman, who played the role in the 2014 film. Brian Tee joined the cast as the Shredder, replacing Tohoru Masamune from the first film. Laura Linney was cast in an unspecified role. Gary Anthony Williams was cast as Bebop, while WWE wrestler Sheamus was confirmed to play Rocksteady. Minae Noji was replaced with Brittany Ishibashi in the role of Karai. CM Punk revealed that he lost the role of Rocksteady to Sheamus. Fred Armisen was originally chosen to voice Krang in the film, but, in May 2016, shortly before the film's release, Brad Garrett voiced Krang instead due to Armisen having schedule conflicts. While promoting Elvis & Nixon, Johnny Knoxville revealed that he was not asked to return for the sequel as the voice of Leonardo.

=== Filming ===
Filming began in April in New York City and Buffalo, New York, spending about $70 million in the state. Filming began on April 27, 2015, when the film crew was spotted filming in Midtown Manhattan and moved out to Foz do Iguaçu, Brazil, with filming in Buffalo beginning on May 4, along the Kensington Expressway and ended May 17. Filming wrapped up in August 2015. Additional filming occurred in New York City on January 30 following year, and ended on February 1. Farrelly and Williams recorded additional dialogue for the film in February 2016.

== Music ==
Steve Jablonsky composed the music score, replacing Brian Tyler from the first film. Mexican teen boy band CD9 performed an updated version of the original show's theme song for the film. The film score soundtrack was released on June 3, 2016, on digital platforms but excluded compact discs.

== Release ==
=== Theatrical ===
Teenage Mutant Ninja Turtles: Out of the Shadows premiered at Madison Square Garden in New York City on May 22, 2016, and was released in the United Kingdom on May 30 and the United States on June 3. It received a one-week special run across 331 IMAX and IMAX 3D theaters from June 2 up to June 9. Outside North America, the film was released in about 30 overseas IMAX markets, beginning Wednesday, June 1, with additional markets throughout the summer, including China on July 2.

=== Marketing ===
Concept art of Bebop and Rocksteady was shown at Paramount Pictures’ CinemaCon panel on April 22, 2015. A 14-second teaser of the trailer was released by Stephen Amell on December 9, 2015. The full trailer debuted the following day.

=== Home media ===
Out of the Shadows was released on Digital HD on September 6, 2016, and on 4K Ultra HD Blu-ray, Blu-ray, Blu-ray 3D, and DVD on September 20. The film debuted in first place on the overall home video sales chart and in second place on the Blu-ray sales chart for the week ending on September 25.

== Reception ==
=== Box office ===
Out of the Shadows grossed $82 million in the United States and Canada and $164 million in other territories for a worldwide total of $246 million, against its production budget of $135 million. It made around 50% less than its predecessor, which had grossed $485 million. In October 2016, in response to the film's poor commercial performance, producers Andrew Form and Brad Fuller said they loved the movie, and they loved making it, but they were surprised by the film's performance, saying "It just didn't find an audience. We really don't know why." The Hollywood Reporter estimated the film lost the studio at least $75 million, when factoring together all expenses and revenues.

In the U.S. and Canada, the film was projected to gross around $30–40 million from 4,071 theaters in its opening weekend, with some estimates going as high as $49 million. The film made $2 million from Thursday night previews which began at 5 p.m., compared to the first film's $4.6 million. On its opening day it earned $12.5 million (including previews), with $4.4 million (36%) coming from 3D showings. In its opening weekend, it grossed $35.3 million, finishing first at the box office. However, its opening was down 45% from the first film's $65.6 million debut. Paramount vice chairman Rob Moore said that while the studio was hoping for a stronger opening, he believed that the film could make up some ground in the coming weeks since most films aimed at younger audiences play at better multiples.

It opened across 40 markets the same weekend as its U.S. release, including big markets like the United Kingdom, Mexico and Russia, which is about 39% of its total international marketplace, and was projected to make around $36 million. It ended up grossing $33 million, which is down 11% when compared to the first film's same suite of markets, and had No. 1 debuts in 21 markets out of the 40. The top openings were in China ($26.1 million), the UK ($5.1 million), Russia ($4.8 million) and Mexico ($4.5 million). In the United Kingdom, it came in second place – behind Warcraft – with a £3.49 million ($5 million) seven-day opening from 513 theaters.

In China the film was granted a rare July release date, along with The Legend of Tarzan, where it grossed an estimated $26.1 million from 6,600 screens in two days. It had a limited opening on Friday, July 1 and opened wide the following day. It faced competition from local film Bounty Hunters which had the advantage of opening wide right from Friday. Yet, Out of the Shadows emerged victorious at the end of the weekend ahead of the latter's $18 million opening. As a result, Out of the Shadows became the ninth consecutive Hollywood import film to debut atop the chart beginning from May 6, 2016. In comparable to Saturday releases, the figure is almost double the launch of Big Hero 6; 41% above the first film; and 18% higher than The Angry Birds Movie. It fell precipitously in its second weekend by 74%, earning $6.6 million and thereby slipped in to fourth place. It opened in key markets such as Germany and Austria on August 11 as well as Japan on August 26, 2016.

=== Critical response ===
On Rotten Tomatoes, the film has an approval rating of 38% based on 173 reviews, with an average rating of 4.7/10. The site's critical consensus reads: "Teenage Mutant Ninja Turtles: Out of the Shadows is a slight improvement over its predecessor, but still lacks the wit or anarchic energy of the comics that birthed the franchise." On Metacritic, the film has a weighted average score of 40 out of 100, based on 30 critics, indicating "mixed or average reviews". Audiences polled by CinemaScore gave the film an average grade of "A−" on an A+ to F scale, an improvement over the first film's "B".

Glenn Kenny of The New York Times gave the film a positive review writing: "This movie is, it happens, easier to sit through than the 2014 film", while also adding that "the 3-D action, overseen by the director Dave Green, is not wholly incoherent. The production values (showcasing new mutants and many gear-heavy extra-dimensional machines undreamed of in any actual engineering philosophy) are ultrashiny. And there are even a couple of amusing, albeit unmemorable, sight gags and one-liners". Edward Douglas of New York Daily News gave the film three out of five stars: "As with the best popcorn flicks, Out of the Shadows offers plenty of mindless entertainment and mind-numbing silliness that somehow works well enough to leave even the Ninja Turtles' biggest detractors shell-shocked". Michael O'Sullivan of The Washington Post praised the film's action sequences and story while overall writing that, "Out of the Shadows is, at least, deliciously silly, even if it is also decidedly forgettable. Like a well-plated but nutrition-free meal, it registers on the senses while being bad for you".

Peter Hartlaub of San Francisco Chronicle gave the film a negative review: "Your 11-year-old is going to love this film. Then he'll grow up and wonder what he was thinking". Sara Stewart of The New York Post gave the film two out of four stars and wrote, "despite the title, the wisecracking turtles named for Renaissance painters are never allowed to shine ... It's a bummer, dude". Lindsey Bahr of the Associated Press gave the film one star out of four and said, "Teenage Mutant Ninja Turtles: Out of the Shadows is a Saturday morning cartoon on Michael Bay steroids. For the under 12 set, that's fine. For the rest of us? It's something to actively avoid".

=== Accolades ===
Year	Award	Category	Recipients	Result	Ref.
2016	2016 Teen Choice Awards	Choice Summer Movie Star: Female	Megan Fox	Nominated	
2016	2016 Teen Choice Awards	Choice Summer Movie Star: Male	Stephen Amell	Nominated	
2017	37th Golden Raspberry Awards	Worst Prequel, Remake, Ripoff or Sequel	Teenage Mutant Ninja Turtles: Out of the Shadows	Nominated	
2017	37th Golden Raspberry Awards	Worst Actress	Megan Fox	Nominated	
2017	2017 Kids' Choice Awards	Favorite Movie	Teenage Mutant Ninja Turtles: Out of the Shadows	Nominated	
2017	2017 Kids' Choice Awards	Favorite Movie Actress	Megan Fox	Nominated	
2017	2017 Kids' Choice Awards	Favorite Movie Actor	Will Arnett	Nominated	
2017	2017 Kids' Choice Awards	Squad	Noel Fisher, Jeremy Howard, Pete Ploszek and Alan Ritchson	Nominated	

== Franchise ==
=== Cancelled sequel ===
Noel Fisher stated in an interview that he and the other Turtle actors had signed on for three films. Megan Fox had also signed on for three films. Tyler Perry said that if a third film was made, his character, Baxter Stockman, would probably mutate into his fly form during the movie. Pete Ploszek also expressed his interests in reprising his role in a third film as Leonardo. In October 2016, in light of the film's mixed reception and financial underperformance, producer Andrew Form indicated that a third film was unlikely.

=== Animated film ===
In June 2020, it was reported that Nickelodeon Animation Studio was developing a computer-animated Teenage Mutant Ninja Turtles film for Paramount Pictures. Seth Rogen, Evan Goldberg, and James Weaver would produce the film through their company, Point Grey Pictures. Jeff Rowe was set to direct the film, with Brendan O'Brien writing the screenplay. It was released on August 2, 2023.

=== Live-action reboot ===
In June 2018, Paramount Pictures announced a new reboot of the series with Bay, Fuller and Form returning to produce the film and Andrew Dodge writing the script. Fuller and Form said at the 24th Critics' Choice Awards that production on the reboot was set to start in 2019, but in July, co-creator Kevin Eastman revealed that the film was still in development and believed that Paramount took the reactions to the 2014 and 2016 films "to heart", and that "its going to be a next-level type of stuff". In August 2021, it was announced that a new live-action film was in the works with Colin Jost and Casey Jost penning the script and Michael Bay, Andrew Form, Brad Fuller, Scott Mednick and Galen Walker signing on as producers. A film adaptation of the graphic novel Teenage Mutant Ninja Turtles: The Last Ronin was announced to be in development by Paramount Pictures in April 2024. The film, produced by Walter Hamada and written by Tyler Burton Smith, would receive an R-rating and be live action. In August 2025, the film was reaffirmed to be moving forward following the merger between Paramount Global and Skydance Media. However, in November 2025, it was reported that development on the film was put on hold as Paramount Skydance appointed Neal H. Moritz to oversee a new live action reboot of the series. Ilya Naishuller was in talks to direct prior to this. In December 2025, Paramount scheduled a new live-action reboot film for a release date of November 17, 2028.
