= Tohoru Masamune =

American actor

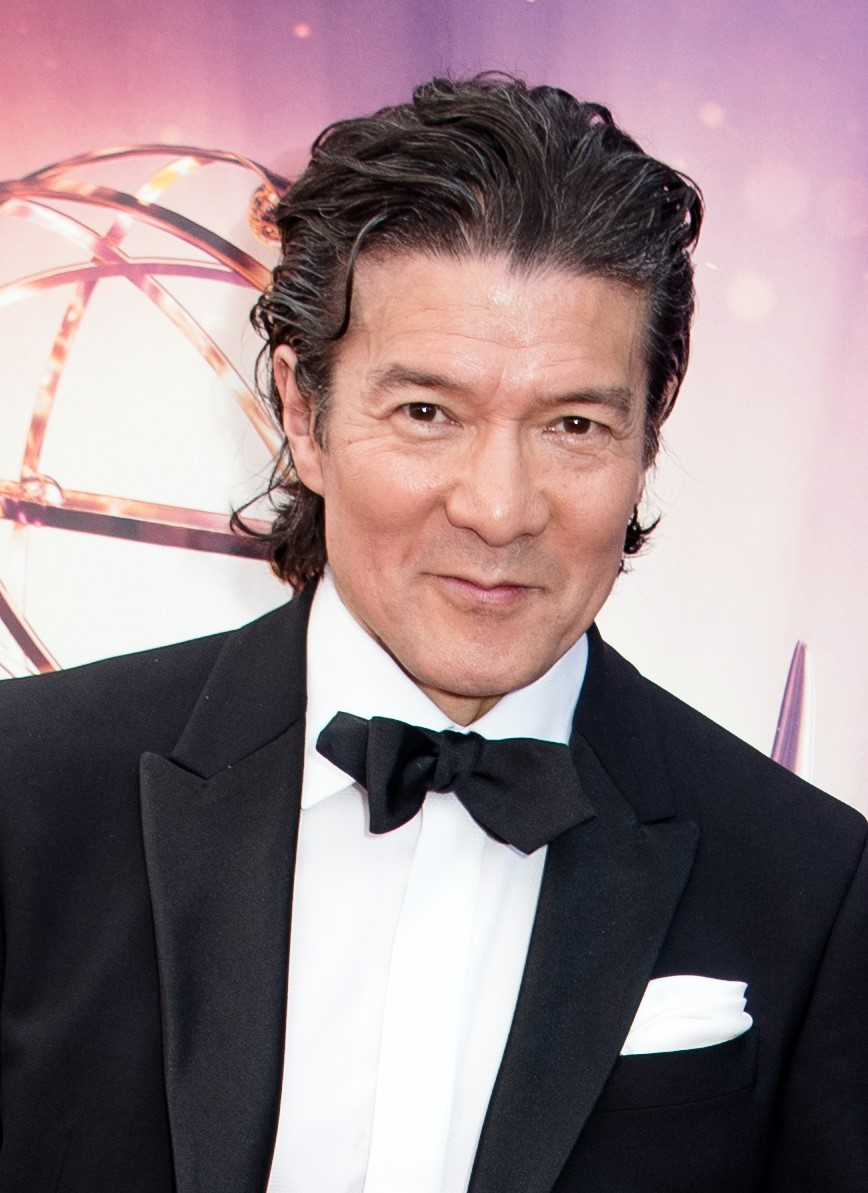
- Masamune at the 2019 Emmy Awards for ARTIFICIAL win, Los Angeles, CA
- Born: Madison, Wisconsin, U.S.
- Education: Massachusetts Institute of Technology (SB)
- Occupations: Actor, voice actor
- Years active: 1990–present

Tohoru Masamune is an American actor. His roles include Shredder in the 2014 Michael Bay film Teenage Mutant Ninja Turtles, Kevin Hall-Yoshida (Paxton's father) in Never Have I Ever, and Inception.

== Early life ==
Masamune was born in Madison, Wisconsin, the son of Japanese parents, Satoru and Takako Masumune (née Nozoe). He spent his childhood in Edmonton, Alberta, Canada. His father, Satoru Masamune, was a prominent research scientist, and Arthur C. Cope professor of chemistry at Massachusetts Institute of Technology. His maternal grandfather, Tetsuo Nozoe, was a celebrated scientist in Japan. His great-grandfather was Juichi Nozoe, a lawyer and politician who was a one-time member of the Japanese National Diet (House of Representatives) His paternal grandfather's cousin was noted Japanese literary figure (novelist and playwright), Hakucho Masamune

Tohoru Masamune graduated from Massachusetts Institute of Technology.

== Career ==
In 1990, Masamune debuted in the film Pacific Heights directed by Academy Award winner, John Schlesinger.

In 1994, he played Ling in Bigfoot: The Unforgettable Encounter. He appeared in the film Inception with the first line of the movie directed by Christopher Nolan, opposite Leonardo DiCaprio and Ken Watanabe. In 2014, he played Oroku Saki / The Shredder in the reboot feature film Teenage Mutant Ninja Turtles. In its 2016 sequel, he is replaced by actor Brian Tee.

He played Haruto Yakimura in Marvel Studios's superhero television series Agents of S.H.I.E.L.D., and appears in the role of Martin Takagi in the paranormal thriller feature film Chatter. He also provided the voice of Chef Haruki in TBS adult animated series American Dad!, Kira Kozu in an episode of the DreamWorks/Nickelodeon animated series Kung Fu Panda: Legends of Awesomeness and Sensei in Disney's Club Penguin online shorts.

He played the starring role of Dr. Matt Lin in the 2019 Primetime Emmy Award and 2019 Peabody Award-winning series, ARTIFICIAL on Twitch.

On stage, he has played starring roles under the direction of Tony Award winner Mary Zimmerman at the Goodman Theater, and Tony Award winner Daniel J. Sullivan at the Williamstown Theatre Festival in a premiere of Far East (play) written by Pulitzer Prize-nominated playwright A.R. Gurney.

As a voice actor, he has appeared in guest roles in animated series such as American Dad!, We Bare Bears, and Kung Fu Panda: Legends of Awesomeness.

== Filmography ==
=== Film ===
Year	Title	Role	Notes
1990	Pacific Heights	Neighbor	
1994	Bigfoot: The Unforgettable Encounter	Ling	
2000	Rugrats in Paris: The Movie	Japanese Tourist	Voice; uncredited
2010	Inception	Japanese Security Guard	
2014	Teenage Mutant Ninja Turtles	Oroku Saki / The Shredder	
2014	Sway	Pastor Joe	

=== Television ===
Year	Title	Role	Notes
1996	Diagnosis: Murder	Al Cho	Episode: "Murder Murder"
1996	Mad About You	Anesthesiologist	Episode: "The Procedure"
1996	The Secret World of Alex Mack	Dr. Matsumura	Episode: "World Without Alex"
1996	The Cape	Hiro Furakawa	2 episodes
1997	The Practice	Technician	Episode: "Part IV"
1997	Ink	George	Episode: "Logan's Run"
1999	Providence	Reporter #2	Episode: "You Can't Hurry Love"
1999	Chicago Hope	Paramedic #8, Paramedic #4	2 episodes
2003	Jackie Chan Adventures	Company Owner	Voice, episode: "Samurai Ratso"
2005	Without a Trace	Mr. Kim	Episode: "Lone Star"
2006	24	CTU Agent	Episode: "Day 5: 9:00 p.m.-10:00 p.m."
2006	Heroes	Boss At Yamagato; Mr. Egami	3 episodes
2008	Big Shots	Riko's Manager	Episode: "The Better Man"
2008	iCarly	Massage Therapist #1, Mr. Fuzawa	2 episodes
2010	SOLO - The Series	Yakuza Bossman	Recurring role
2011	The Young and the Restless	Myanmar Official	2 episodes
2012	Shake It Up	Executive #1	Episode: "Made in Japan"
2013	Kung Fu Panda: Legends of Awesomeness	Kira Kozu	Voice, episode: "The Way of the Prawn"
2015	Game Shakers	Alan	Episode: "Lost on the Subway"
2016	Agents of S.H.I.E.L.D.	Haruto Yakimura	Episode: "The Inside Man"
2016	We Bare Bears	Manager	Voice, episode: "Losing Ice"
2016	American Dad!	Chief Haruki	Voice, episode: "The Enlightenment of Ragi-Baba"
2017	Teenage Mutant Ninja Turtles	Samurais, Shiro Neko Ninja	Voice, 2 episodes
2021	Infinity Train	Ryan's Father	Voice, episode: "The Twin Tapes"
2021	Never Have I Ever	Kevin Hall-Yoshida	Recurring role

=== Video games ===
Year	Title	Credit
1994	Twisted: The Game Show	Johnny Pow
1999	Wu-Tang: Shaolin Style	Voice
2010	EA Sports MMA	Katsuo Yamada
2020	Ghost of Tsushima	Sword Fight Choreography Consultant
