= Shredder (Teenage Mutant Ninja Turtles) =

Supervillain in the Teenage Mutant Ninja Turtles franchise

- Teenage Mutant Ninja Turtles character
- Cover art from Teenage Mutant Ninja Turtles #10 (2012 IDW Publishing). Art by Dan Duncan.
- First appearance: Teenage Mutant Ninja Turtles #1 (May 1984)
- Created by: Kevin Eastman and Peter Laird
- Portrayed by: Mainline: James Saito (1990 film); François Chau (The Secret of the Ooze); Kevin Nash (Super Shredder in The Secret of the Ooze); Patrick P. Pon (Ninja Turtles: The Next Mutation); Tohoru Masamune (2014 film); William Fichtner (in-suit portrayal in 2014 film); Brian Tee (Out of the Shadows); Others: Beau Allen (The Coming Out of Their Shells Tour)
- Voiced by: Mainline: James Avery (1987 series Seasons 1-7); David McCharen (1990 and 1991 films); William E. Martin (1987 series Seasons 8-10); Doug Parker (The Next Mutation); Scott Rayow (2003 series and video game, Turtles in Time Re-Shelled, Smash-Up, Turtles Forever); Kevin Michael Richardson (2012 series, Danger of the Ooze, Portal Power, Wrath of the Mutants); Tohoru Masamune (in-suit voiceover for 2014 film); Hoon Lee (Rise of the Teenage Mutant Ninja Turtles); Others: Dorian Harewood (1987 series substitute for four episodes in 1989); Pat Fraley (1987 series, young Shredder in "Leatherhead Terror of the Swamp"); Jim Cummings (1987 series substitute for nine episodes from 1990 to 1991, Nickelodeon All-Star Brawl 1 and Nickelodeon All-Star Brawl 2); Townsend Coleman (1987 series substitute for two episodes in 1991; Kiyoyuki Yanada (Superhuman Legend, Japanese media); Kwasi Songui (2007 video game); Load Williams ('87 counterpart in Turtles Forever); David Wills (Mirage counterpart in Turtles Forever); Matthew Yang King (2013 video game, Don vs. Raph, Call of Duty: Modern Warfare 2 DLC); William Fichtner (2014 film tie-in game); Nolan North (Mutants in Manhattan); Brian Bloom (Turtles Take Time (and Space)); Tommy Sica (TMNT Team Up!); Jim Foronda (SMITE TMNT Battle Pass); Andrew Kishino (DC crossover film); Sean Gurnsey (Shredder's Revenge)

In-universe information
- Full name: Oroku Saki (Image comics); Ch'rell (2003 series); Oroku Yoshi (Mirage Volume 4); Eric Sacks (Nintendo 3DS)
- Aliases: Emperor Shredder (1987 series); Master Shredder; Super Shredder; Zombie Shredder; Joker Shredder
- Species: Human
- Affiliation: Foot Clan
- Abilities: Criminal mastermind; Master of ninjutsu, martial arts and hand-to-hand combat; Utilizes bladed armor

The Shredder is a supervillain and the main antagonist of the Teenage Mutant Ninja Turtles media franchise created by Kevin Eastman and Peter Laird. The character first appeared in the Mirage Studios comic book Teenage Mutant Ninja Turtles #1 (1984), and has since endured as the archenemy of the turtles and their master Splinter.

The Shredder is usually depicted as the alter ego of Oroku Saki, the ruthless leader of a Japanese criminal ninja organization known as the Foot Clan.

In 2009, IGN ranked the Shredder as the 39th-greatest comic-book villain of all time. The character has been featured in almost every media adaptation of the TMNT franchise, having been portrayed in live-action films by James Saito, François Chau, Tohoru Masamune, and Brian Tee. James Avery, Scottie Ray, Kevin Michael Richardson and Hoon Lee are among the actors who have voiced the character in animated films and television shows.

== Concept and creation ==
Kevin Eastman got the idea for the Shredder's armor from large trapezoidal cheese graters which he envisioned on a villainous character's arms. He then said, "Could you imagine a character with weapons on his arms like this?" Peter Laird suggested the name The Shredder. Although Shredder is often depicted as the main antagonist in most TMNT adaptations, it was never the creators' intention to be the case in his original inception in the Mirage Comics:

In truth, though many TMNT fans who became fans via the first animated series see Shredder as a REALLY important part of an ongoing, long-running battle with the Turtles, I don't think Kevin or I ever did. Yes, he was an important part of their history, and they probably would not have come into existence without his involvement in their world (or more accurately Splinter's world)... but that's about it. Other than bringing Shredder back for "Return to New York" (and the few issues preceding that set that arc up), I never missed him in any of the other TMNT books I worked on.
—Peter Laird

== Comic books ==
=== Mirage and Image ===
==== Oroku Saki ====
Shredder in his debut in Teenage Mutant Ninja Turtles #1 (May 1984), Art by Kevin Eastman.

In the original comic books from Mirage Comics, Oroku Saki had an elder brother by the name of Oroku Nagi, who had been killed by fellow ninja Hamato Yoshi (the owner of Splinter, the Turtles' mentor) in a feud over a woman named Tang Shen, resulting in Yoshi fleeing with Shen to the United States.

Angered by the death of his elder brother, Saki joined the Foot Clan and trained to be a ninja. He quickly became one of their deadliest warriors and rose up the ranks and was chosen to lead the Foot's American branch. Operating in New York under the name of the Shredder, Saki used the opportunity to avenge his brother by killing Yoshi and Shen. Under Saki's leadership, the Foot participated in variety of criminal activities, including drug smuggling, arms running, and assassination.

Fifteen years later, the Shredder was challenged by the Ninja Turtles, who were the result of an accident exposing four ordinary turtles to radioactive waste. They were trained by Yoshi's pet rat Splinter, who had also been mutated by the same substance, to avenge his former master. After a lengthy rooftop battle where the Shredder seemed to be winning, Leonardo managed to plunge his sword through the Shredder's torso. Defeated, he was offered the opportunity to commit seppuku (ritual suicide), but refused and detonated a thermite grenade, in an attempt to take their lives alongside his own. But at the last second, Donatello used his bō to knock Shredder off the building to his death.

The Shredder returns on Christmas Eve seemingly resurrected with an army of Foot Ninjas, severely beating Leonardo and burning down the apartment of the turtles' ally April O'Neil, forcing them to go into hiding outside the city.

A year later, in the story "Return to New York", the Turtles returned to settle the score with the Shredder. Leonardo faced off against Oroku Saki alone, during which the Shredder revealed he was brought back to life by a technique using worms feeding on his remains and recreating his cells to reform his body. The same technique was also used to create the Shredder Clones. In the battle, Leonardo decapitates the villain, finally killing him, and the four turtles burn his body at the Hudson River.

==== Tales of the TMNT ====
In the second volume of the anthology series Tales of the Teenage Mutant Ninja Turtles story "Worms of Madness", it is shown that a few weeks after the events of their final battle, the Shredder had yet another resurrection of sorts when a Foot Mystic reactivated the worms. However, the Foot Mystic did not resurrect Saki himself but the worm colony which had gained sentience and retained Saki's memories and believing itself to be Saki. The worms then went out to find a new body and chose that of a shark. After the Foot kidnapped Splinter, the turtles managed to engage the "Shredder-Shark" in battle, defeating it by severing its connection to the mystic. At this point, the creature realized that it was not the real Saki.

The "Shredder-Shark" returned once more kidnapping Casey Jones's adopted daughter Shadow to lure the Turtles into a trap. With the Turtles away, it was up to Casey and Splinter to defeat it and rescue Shadow, finally killing the creature.

==== Other versions of the Shredder ====
Throughout a considerable part of the Image comic series, Raphael tries to impersonate the Shredder by wearing his armor. Following this, he is accepted as the leader of the Foot Clan. In later issues of the series, a mysterious Lady Shredder appears to challenge Raphael. Although the book was canceled before her identity could be revealed, writer Gary Carlson confirmed after the fact that she was meant to be Karai. The female ninja Pimiko also claims to be the Shredder's daughter.

In Volume Four series, Leonardo encounters Oroku Yoshi, a Battle Nexus contestant wearing armor almost identical to that of the second animated series' Shredder. His connection to Oroku Saki and the Foot is not known.

=== Archie Comics ===
The Archie Comics series uses the same background as the 1987 animated series, as the first issues are identical. Later in the Archie comics version, the Shredder travels to the future and works with Armaggon and Verminator X to offset the skill and experience of the future versions of the Turtles.

This version of the character was more in line with the early episodes' depiction of the character as a cunning adversary and in many issues nearly proves to be a lethal enemy, coming close to defeating the turtles on a number of occasions, even aiding Armaggon and Verminator X in the defeat and capture of two of the turtles in the future. However, he shows some amount of honor in the comic. His final fate within the Archie comics series remains unknown, although a three-part mini-series put out by Archie comics after the end of its regular comic series seems to indicate he remains a consistent foe to the turtles for many years. The Shredder is left in a vegetative state in the aftermath of his final battle with the Turtles.

=== IDW Publishing ===
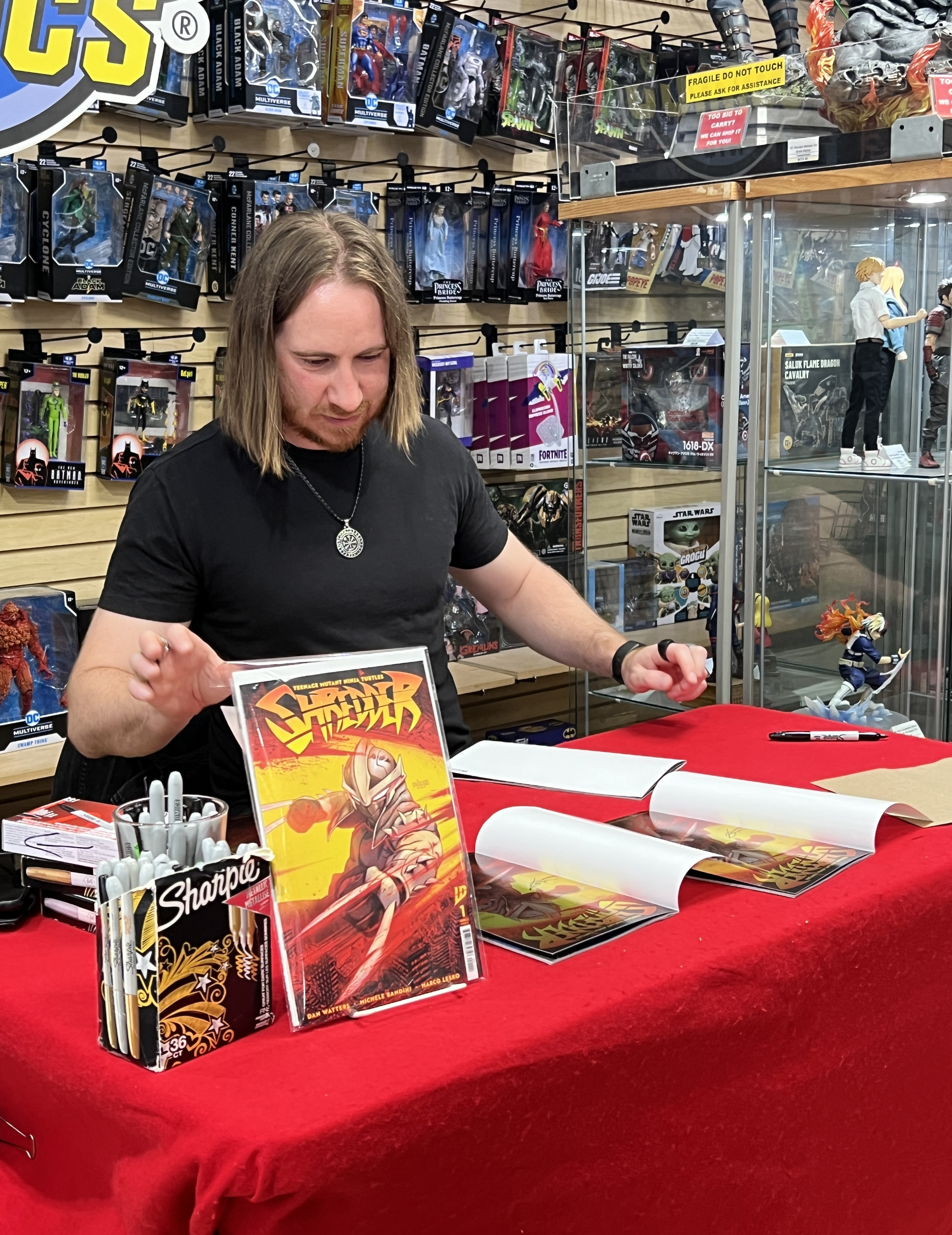
Writer Dan Watters at an August 2, 2025 signing for IDW Publishing's Teenage Mutant Ninja Turtles: Shredder #1 at Midtown Comics Grand Central in Manhattan

In feudal Japan, Oroku Saki was a high-ranking member of the Foot Clan along with Hamato Yoshi. While Yoshi focused on his family, Saki surpassed him and was promoted to Jonin (leader) of the Foot. After an argument on his style of leadership, Saki sent ninja to murder Yoshi's wife, Tang Shen, and later Yoshi and his four sons.

With the help of Kitsune, Saki steals regenerative ooze from an Utrom known as "The Iron Demon" (later revealed to be Krang) which is used to preserve his body until he is awakened by his descendant Oroku Karai in modern-day New York. During his time in stasis, his spirit conquered the realm of the Afterlife, where he learned he was destined to rule the earth world and eventually return to the Afterlife as a lost soul. Knowing the future, he vows to change it by conquering the realm of the Afterlife upon his return.

The Shredder first appears in Micro-series #1 and in full costume on the final page of issue #9. Dan Duncan first designed the Shredder with input from Mateus Santolouco and Kevin Eastman; originally wanting to depict a "beefy...monster" he decided to simplify the design and slimmed down the character based on the original Mirage design.

Seeking control in his forthcoming battle for power, the Shredder offers Splinter a place in his army but Splinter refuses, revealing himself to be a reincarnated Hamato Yoshi. Saki reveals his own identity and attacks Splinter, almost killing him when the Turtles arrive to rescue their father. Impressed by Leonardo, he orders his capture and conducts a plan involving kidnapping and stabbing Casey Jones. The Shredder then has Kitsune brainwash Leonardo to become his new Chunin (second-in-command) and uses him for a show of strength to the criminal underworld. After the Turtles rescue Leonardo, the Shredder calls a meeting with Krang and proposes an alliance in exchange for Utrom technologies, which Krang rejects. A short battle results in retreat on both sides and the revelation that the Shredder had stolen some Utrom resources from Krang's compound to begin creating a mutant army (in the form of Bebop, Rocksteady, Koya and Bludgeon).

In Issue #50, the Shredder faced Splinter and the turtles in a final battle which he lost and briefly admitted his faults and also making Karai the new head of the Foot Clan in the event of his death. Splinter then retaliated by slashing deep into the back of his head with his sword, killing Shredder instantly.

After his death, Shredder's body is kept in a crypt that is guarded by Jennika who was assigned by Hamato Yoshi in order to learn humility. His tomb is eventually desecrated by the witch Kitsune who plans to revive Oroku Saki in order to restore order to the Foot Clan but Splinter knew this and keeps the skull to foil her attempts.

The Shredder would reappear in the miniseries Shredder in Hell. In this series, he is in the afterlife and descends into the underworld trying to find the truth of his own soul meanwhile Kitsune uses his corpse to summon her father as his host. The Shredder also fought his past life Takeshi Tasuo in his inner conflict until Splinter/Hamato Yoshi later shows up to help him against the forces of Hell.

Weeks before Mutant Town was established, Old Hob detonated a mutagen bomb the day Baxter Stockman became the Mayor of New York City, Oroku Saki resurfaces and saves April from a group of mutant eels, who are the offspring of the Slithery.

In Teenage Mutant Ninja Turtles: Urban Legends, the IDW-published colorized reprint and later completion of the previously unfinished Teenage Mutant Ninja Turtles, Volume 3 by Image Comics, it was revealed that Amai, the daughter of Karai, is Lady Shredder.

In The Last Ronin five issue miniseries, Oroku Hiroto, Saki's grandson and Karai's son, becomes the new Shredder and is the main villain of the miniseries.

== Television ==
=== 1987 animated series ===
Shredder as he appeared in the 1987 animated series

In the 1987 animated series, Oroku Saki and Hamato Yoshi were both members of the Foot Clan in Japan. After Saki framed him for the attempted murder of a visiting sensei, Yoshi was forced to exile himself to New York City, where he lived in the sewers with four pet turtles who were accidentally dropped down a storm drain.

In the following years, Saki took leadership of the Foot Clan and took on his Shredder persona. He also met a trans-dimensional alien called Krang and used the advanced technology at his disposal to replace the Foot Ninja with robots called the Foot Soldiers. He secretly moved to New York, where he found Yoshi still alive. In an attempt to kill his old foe, the Shredder dumped mutagen in the sewers. This mutates Yoshi into Splinter, and he starts training the also mutated Turtles in ninjutsu. After the Turtles discovered their operation in New York City, the Shredder became their enemy and would stop at nothing until they were defeated, often holding the Turtles' human ally April O'Neil captive as bait.

The Shredder was voiced by James Avery for seasons one to seven and William E. Martin for seasons eight and ten, with the alternates being Dorian Harewood and Pat Fraley (albeit only 1 episode) in 1989, Jim Cummings in 1991–1993 and Townsend Coleman in 1993. In the 2009 crossover film Turtles Forever, the 1987 version of the Shredder was voiced by Load Williams. In the 2012 series, the 1987 version of the Shredder is voiced by Kevin Michael Richardson, replacing James Avery following his death.

==== Depiction ====
In his early appearances, the Shredder was presented as extremely cunning and was described by Splinter himself as the most dangerous adversary he ever faced. His intelligence persevered throughout his various portrayals, and in several instances, it is claimed that he has an IQ of 300. As the 1987 animated series was more light-hearted than the comics, the Shredder was initially depicted as incompetent. He and Krang are constantly bickering about tactics and often take pleasure in the other's failings.

Despite the Shredder's failings, he is still shown to have considerable skills. In martial arts, he is often shown to surpass the Turtles and to be equaled only by Splinter. Nevertheless, he usually runs away from a fight when outnumbered, incapacitating the Turtles to defeat them in combat; as the series progressed, however, the Turtles were able to battle him on more equal grounds and even defeat him in combat on several occasions.

From mid-season seven onwards, the Shredder was depicted as a more serious threat, full of anger and bloodlust, though he was still easily defeated by the Turtles. His friendship with Krang also appeared to have grown. There were many times that the Shredder could have just left Krang at the mercy of the Turtles or Lord Dregg, but he always rescued him and went as far as to donate his life energy to save him.

==== Family ====
Shredder's family is presented in three episodes. In the episode "Shredder's Mom", Shredder's mother Miyoko helps Shredder and Krang in an attempt to destroy the world's climate. In this episode, Miyoko first learns of her son's criminal activities and proves herself to be villainous. However, she constantly treats Shredder like a baby, until he gets fed up with it and transports her back to her retirement home. In the episode "My Brother, the Bad Guy", it is revealed that Oroku Saki has a younger brother, Kazuo who works as a police lieutenant in Tokyo. Kazuo and the Turtles try to join forces to stop one of the Shredder's plans, but his fervent respect for the law clashes with the Turtles' "whatever it takes" attitude. Finally, the episode "The Legend of Koji" features Saki's distant ancestor Oroku Sancho, who lived in Japan in 1583. He is the leader of a small clan, and every bit as wicked as his descendant. When the Shredder offers to help him find magical relics that would provide him with power and wealth, Sancho takes the Shredder's information, then betrays him and orders his men to kill him. However, Sancho is also a coward, and when he breaks down in the face of danger, his men abandon him.

=== The Next Mutation ===
In Ninja Turtles: The Next Mutation, the Shredder (portrayed by Patrick Pon, voiced by Doug Parker) is still the Turtles' sworn enemy. This time, however, Venus uses her powers to stop Oroku Saki from taking control of the Shredder's mind. After the Foot Clan disbands, he ends up living on the streets. Later, the Dragon Lord's rank warriors attack him to get a medallion that was in his possession. Splinter saves him and takes him to the Turtles' lair to protect him.

In the show, the Shredder wore a general attire similar to the one he wore in the second film, but with a heavily altered helmet/mask due to the lesser budget for the TV series as compared to the films, which had allowed for more detailed props and costume pieces. He appeared only a few times in the show, due to the main antagonist of the series being a draconic being from another dimension and thus supplanted the Shredder as the Turtles' nemesis.

=== 2003 animated series ===
Several individuals take on the mantle of the Shredder in the 2003 animated series, all of whom, except for Karai, are voiced by Scottie Ray.

==== Utrom Shredder ====
The Shredder's primary armor design (left) and a damaged version revealing his true Utrom form (right) from the 2003 animated series

The Utrom Shredder is the main antagonist and primary Shredder of the series who serves as the archenemy of the Turtles and Splinter.

Ch'rell is a megalomaniacal and genocidal Utrom warlord who escapes captivity by causing an Utrom ship to crash-land on Earth during the Sengoku period of feudal Japan. After commandeering a humanoid exosuit designed by the Utroms to disguise themselves among the humans, Ch'rell takes inspiration from an ancient Japanese legend of a Demon Tengu to craft a dual identity as a wealthy Japanese philanthropist named Oroku Saki and a ruthless crime lord known as the Shredder. He founds a criminal ninja organization called the Foot Clan and, centuries later, adopts and trains an abandoned girl named Karai to lead the Foot Clan in Japan while he moves to New York City to hunt down his former Utrom captors. Ch'rell kills the Utroms' guardian Hamato Yoshi when he refuses to reveal their location, inadvertently leading to the mutation of Yoshi's pet rat Splinter and four baby turtles by mutagenic ooze created by the Utroms.

In the first season set years later, Ch'rell tasks his right-hand man Hun, the leader of the Purple Dragons gang, and scientist Baxter Stockman with killing the Turtles when they begin interfering with the Foot Clan's operations. Following the repeated failures of his underlings, Ch'rell attempts to deceive the Turtles into serving him but the Turtles manage to defeat him with the help of Splinter, beginning Ch'rell's vendetta against them which makes up the main conflict of the next two seasons. In the third season, Ch'rell uses his wealth and influence as Oroku Saki to repair the damage left in the wake of the Triceratons' failed invasion of Earth, secretly salvaging the remnants of their alien technology to construct a spacecraft so that he can return to the stars, retaliate against the Utroms, and conquer the universe. However, Ch'rell's plan is foiled by the Turtles and the Utroms, who exile him to a desolate ice asteroid for his crimes.

In the finale film Turtles Forever, Ch'rell is freed from exile by his counterpart from the 1987 series. After learning of the existence of the multiverse, Ch'rell attempts to use the Technodrome to destroy the Turtles' source planet, Turtle Prime, and thereby eliminate every Ninja Turtle in existence, but the Mirage Turtles, 1987 Turtles, and 2003 Turtles team up to defeat Ch'rell.

In "Same As It Never Was", Donatello is transported to an alternate future in which the Shredder has succeeded in subjugating Earth. By then, Splinter had died protecting his sons and Casey Jones died fighting the Foot Clan. Ch'rell also severed Michelangelo's left arm and Raphael's left eye. When Donatello leads a final rebellion against the Shredder's fortress, his Foot forces kill Michelangelo while Karai kills Leonardo and Raphael. April avenges Leonardo and Raphael by using a rocket launcher on Karai, and the Shredder is killed by Donatello with the Tunneler.

In "Timing is Everything", Leonardo and Cody Jones are accidentally sent back in time to the aftermath of the Turtles' first battle with the Shredder. Later, the Shredder and several Foot ninjas are transported to 2105 but are easily defeated by the Turtles' futuristic technology.

In the IDW comic series, Ch'rell appears as a separate individual from the Shredder.

==== Karai ====
Karai is the adopted daughter of the Utrom Shredder. She takes on the mantle of the Shredder and continues her father's legacy following his exile, though she later renounces the title and begins a non-hostile relationship with the Turtles.

==== Tengu Shredder ====
The original Shredder was a demonic Tengu who terrorized ancient Japan. On the verge of death after being defeated by the Five Dragon warriors, it made a deal with Oroku Saki; if Saki allowed the demon to enter and possess him, he would gain all of its power. Saki became the next Shredder but his reign of terror ended when his former comrades, now the Ninja Tribunal, captured and entombed him. The Tengu Shredder is resurrected centuries later by his five mystic heralds, forcing the Ninja Tribunal to recruit the Turtles and all of their allies to stand against him. Karai uses a mystic link shared by all who take on the mantle of the Shredder to weaken the demon, allowing the Turtles to summon the spirit of Hamato Yoshi and deliver the final blow, destroying the Tengu.

==== Cyber Shredder ====
The Cyber Shredder is an artificial intelligence and a digital copy of Ch'rell created in the event of his death. The futuristic Viral accidentally releases this copy of Ch'rell's consciousness, creating the Cyber Shredder. While he is initially confined to cyberspace, the Cyber Shredder ultimately manages to escape and become a physical being. In the final episode of the series, he leads the Foot Clan in an attack on April O'Neil and Casey Jones's wedding. The Cyber Shredder is finally destroyed when the Turtles erase him with a de-compiler previously used against Viral.

=== 2012 animated series ===
The Shredder appears in the 2012 animated series, voiced by Kevin Michael Richardson.

His Japanese origins as Oroku Saki and brotherly relationship with Hamato Yoshi is mostly intact, with the Foot Clan and the Hamato Clan being later revealed as having a long-term rivalry before the Hamato family killed the Oroku family, wiped out their entire clan and took in the orphaned Saki as their own. Despite being raised as brothers, both Saki and Yoshi eventually became rivals due to the love of Tang Shen, whose decision to marry Yoshi drove Saki to discover his true heritage and turn on his former brother, eventually destroying everything Yoshi held dear, including Tang Shen (whom he had killed by accident) and the entire Hamato Clan (starting with the destruction of the Hamato Clan monastery, which resulted with Saki's head getting burned, scarred, and hairless). Blaming Tang Shen's untimely death on Yoshi, Saki returned to his biological family and became the new leader of the newly restored Foot Clan, tutoring ninjutsu students such as world-famous martial artist Chris Bradford and Brazilian street thug Xever Montes, sharing criminal business with business partners such as Russian arms dealer Ivan Steranko, Sicilian mob boss Don Visiozo, and Purple Dragons leader Hun. In addition, he also a pet akita named Hachiko (named after the akita of the same name). Shredder wears the Kuro Kabuto, a helmet that served as his symbol of power over the Foot Clan.

The Shredder first appeared at the end of "Rise of the Turtles, Part 2" where he traveled to New York when he learned that Hamato Yoshi is training his own ninjas after seeing his clan symbol on a shuriken left behind by the Turtles during a recent fight on a TV news report. Determined to kill Yoshi, Shredder sends the Foot Clan after the Turtles. In the episode "The Gauntlet", Shredder confronts the Turtles in person and nearly wins the battle until he is distracted by Bradford and Montes, who had inadvertently been mutated during the battle. Although Shredder plans to kill Baxter Stockman for interfering with his plans to kill the Turtles, he changes his mind, commenting on how Stockman's scientific knowledge could be useful to him. In the episode "Showdown", it is revealed that Shredder took Splinter's daughter, Miwa, and raised her as Karai. He has told her that he is her biological father and it was Splinter who killed her mother, as she has sworn revenge ever since. Shredder initially dismisses the Kraang's presence in New York, but after capturing one, decides to ally with them to destroy the Turtles.

Early in the second season, in "Follow the Leader", Shredder leaves for Japan to deal with a situation, leaving Karai as the interim leader of his Foot Clan. He orders Karai not to attack the Turtles nor make any dealings with the Kraang behind his back and is livid when Karai disobeys him. In the episode "The Manhattan Project", Shredder returns along with Tiger Claw, a Japanese circus performer who was mutated into an anthropomorphic tiger and became Shredder's lieutenant. Tiger Claw brings Splinter before him, but complications from a Kraang operation in the city and the Turtles' own efforts thwart Shredder's plans. In "The Wrath of Tiger Claw", the Shredder and Tiger Claw attempt to use Karai to set a trap for the Turtles. When Karai sees a photograph of Hamato Yoshi, Tang Shen, and herself as an infant, she realizes that the Turtles were telling the truth and sided with them, resulting in her being captured while buying them time to escape Tiger Claw. In the episode "Vengeance is Mine", Shredder attempts to use Karai as bait for a trap that would mutate the Turtles into snakes, intending to have them kill Splinter. The plan backfires when Karai is exposed to the mutagen, turning her into a mutant snake.

In the two-part second-season finale "The Invasion", the Shredder and Kraang Prime form a full alliance in which the Shredder and the Foot Clan will help the Kraang take over New York and then the world, and in turn, the Kraang will return Karai to her human form and deliver Splinter and the Turtles to him. The Shredder subsequently injures Leo and battles Splinter and Leatherhead, defeating the pair and seemingly killing the former. During the Kraang occupation of the city, the Shredder conscripts Steranko and Anton Zeck into the Foot Clan, has them mutated, and orders them to recapture Karai for him. The Kraang invasion is thwarted by the Turtles and the Mighty Mutanimals, with the Shredder using the ensuing chaos to take control of the city's criminal underworld.

In the two-part third season finale, "Annihilation: Earth!", the Shredder briefly teams up with Splinter to stop a black hole machine that was going to destroy Earth. He betrays and stabs Splinter, killing him in front of the turtles. Proclaiming that his victory over Splinter is more important to him than even saving the world, Shredder is sucked into the black hole along with his followers and Splinter while the turtles, April, and Casey escape Earth's destruction. In the episodes "Beyond the Known Universe" and "Earth's Last Stand", the Turtles travel back in time to six months earlier in an effort to prevent Earth's destruction. Their efforts result in Splinter's death being averted. The Shredder is injured in battle and carried away by Tiger Claw.

A critically injured Shredder orders Stockman to mutate him to give him the power needed to exact his revenge. As Super-Shredder, the Shredder manages to kill Splinter a second time. In the season four finale "Owari", the Shredder burns down his new lair and confronts the Turtles in a final showdown on the roof. His unique mutation makes him immune to Donatello's retro-mutagen, which allows him to beat Raphael, Donatello, and Michelangelo all at once, leaving only Leonardo left standing. After a heated one-on-one duel, Leonardo kills Shredder.

Many months later, the Kabuto and Shredder's heart are separated by unknown means and hidden in secret locations throughout New York. His heart was contained within a glass vial that came into the possession of Don Vzioso, which Tiger Claw and a demodragon named Kavaxas seek, as it is essential to revive him and then came back in a zombie-like form that was later revealed to be under Kavaxas’ control. Shredder drags Kavaxas back to the Netherworld, as they "[did] not belong here" in the mortal world.

=== 2018 animated series ===
Shredder as depicted in Rise of the Teenage Mutant Ninja Turtles

The Shredder appears in Rise of the Teenage Mutant Ninja Turtles, voiced by Hoon Lee.

500 years before the series, Oroku Saki was the leader of the peaceful Foot Clan and father of the Hamato Clan founder, Karai, whose soul was swallowed by the demonic and nigh-unstoppable Kuroi Yōroi armor after it was forged by a powerful Oni (in reality the alien Krang). After being transformed into the Shredder, Saki led the Foot down a path of darkness, unleashing unspeakable chaos across Japan in the process. With no other choice, Karai was forced to create her own clan, the Hamato Clan, to end the demon's reign of terror. The Shredder continued terrorizing Japan until he was defeated by Karai using her mystic Hamato Ninpō energy to send him into a dimension called the Twilight Realm, and the Kuroi Yōroi was scattered across the world to prevent his return. The side effect of the Shredder's defeat had sent Karai into the Twilight Realm, along with the Shredder's sapience being sealed away. In the aftermath, Karai's remaining followers made it their sworn duty to watch over the armor pieces and never allow the Foot to reclaim them.

The Foot, allied with Baron Draxum, began collecting the armor pieces to resurrect him starting in "Shadow of Evil", with the Yōkai alchemist being promised of its dark power to protect his people from an ancient prophecy predicting their destruction.

After the Kuroi Yōroi is reassembled, Draxum dons the armor, intent on destroying humanity once and for all in his misguided quest to protect the Yōkai. The Foot Lieutenant and the Foot Brute address him as the Shredder, but he rejects the title. Due to a flaw in the armor, it is not able to properly absorb Draxum's power.

In "Battle Nexus: New York," Big Mama secretly attaches a control device and its associated magic ring to the Shredder, placing him under her control. When the ring is removed from Big Mama during the fight, the Foot Recruit claims it. The Shredder destroys the Grand Nexus Hotel, flying out into the city with the Foot Recruit on his back.

The Foot Recruit tries to take the collar of the Shredder to no avail until the Turtles, seeking a way to defeat him, learn of a weapon in the Twilight Realm, who is actually Karai, and recover her. The Shredder regains his sapience in the process. He attacks the Turtle's lair, with the lair destroyed and Karai defeated, the Turtles escaped with Todd while Splinter and Draxum, who has since reformed, remain behind to buy them time and are captured.

The Shredder starts extracting Hamato Yoshi's essence with the Empyrean, but the Turtles arrive with their Hamato ninpo unlocked and Karai's spirit within April's body. The Shredder tries to absorb Yoshi's essence but the Foot Recruit, having a change of heart, saves Splinter. The Turtles and Splinter with the help of their allies and the spirit of ancient Hamatos, destroy the Shredder's armor and free Oroku Saki, whose spirit moves on to the afterlife.

== Films ==
The Shredder was portrayed by James Saito in the first film and by François Chau in the second, while his Super Shredder form was portrayed by professional wrestler Kevin Nash. In all cases, the character was voiced by David McCharen. Oroku Saki (in flashback form) is portrayed by an unknown stuntman.

=== Teenage Mutant Ninja Turtles (1990) ===
In the first film Teenage Mutant Ninja Turtles, Oroku Saki and Hamato Yoshi were rival martial artists in Japan and both loved a woman named Tang Shen. Shen, who loved only Yoshi, persuaded him not to fight Saki honorably; instead, they fled for the United States. Saki followed them to New York City; when Yoshi returned home from his construction job he found his beloved Shen lying dead on the floor, he was ambushed and overpowered by Saki. Saki wasted no words and during the struggle, Splinter's cage was broken. Splinter leaped up onto Saki's face, biting and clawing, but the rogue ninja threw him to the floor and took one swipe with his katana, slicing Splinter's ear. After this incident, it was said that Saki is never heard from again. The comic book adaptation of the film retains the original comic book origin story, with Oroku Nagi being killed and Saki coming to America to seek vengeance.

Saki, in his "Shredder" persona, establishes an American branch of the Foot Clan. With the aid of his second-in-command Tatsu, he manipulates and recruits troubled teens as a brutal yet Machiavellian leader and father figure, teaching them ninjitsu to make them into skilled thieves and assassins. The Shredder sends the Foot Clan to "silence" April O'Neil when she reports on the Foot Clan's connection to the recent crime wave, inadvertently leading them to the Turtles' hideout when Raphael saves April. The Shredder had Splinter kidnapped and imprisoned him in his warehouse hideout, and has the Foot Clan hunt the Turtles. He beats Splinter while interrogating him about how the Turtles learned their fighting techniques.

After the Turtles successfully defeat the Foot Clan in a final assault, the Shredder confronts them on a rooftop. He defeats all of the Turtles with his superior skills and threatens Leonardo with his yari to force the others to toss away their weapons. Splinter, freed by Turtles' allies, Danny Pennington and Casey Jones, intervenes and reveals to the Shredder that they met years ago, as he was Hamato Yoshi's pet. The Shredder unmasks himself, revealing the scars that Splinter gave him, and charges Splinter to impale him. Splinter counters with Michelangelo's nunchaku to send him over the side of the roof. The Shredder throws a tanto at Splinter. Splinter caught the knife, but had to let go of the nunchaku that was holding onto the spear, making the Shredder fall into a parked garbage truck far below. Casey Jones then activates the crushing mechanism; the viewers are then shown a closeup of the Shredder's helmet being crushed, implying his death.

=== TMNT II: The Secret of the Ooze (1991) ===
In the second film Teenage Mutant Ninja Turtles II: The Secret of the Ooze, the Shredder was portrayed by François Chau, replacing Saito. In the film, the Turtles believe that since Casey had crushed him in the garbage truck, the Shredder was dead. It is soon revealed that the Shredder had survived the crushing and revitalized his Foot Clan to get vengeance on the Turtles. After finding the Foot "fallback" headquarters in a junkyard, Tatsu was asking who would challenge him to cover for the Shredder until Shredder appeared. Tatsu allowed the Shredder to lead the Foot Clan. Shredder sent a member of the Foot to follow April, hoping to find the Turtles through her. When April's team was doing a report on T.G.R.I. in New Jersey, April's camera operator/Foot Clan member Freddy found some mutated dandelions and sent one to the Shredder. He then orders Tatsu to obtain a sample of the T.G.R.I. mutagen that mutated the Turtles, as well as kidnap researcher Jordan Perry. Using the last mutagen and Perry's research, the Shredder creates his own mutants, Tokka and Rahzar, from a stolen snapping turtle and a brown wolf respectively. Though initially enraged at their infant-like intelligence, he soon plays it to his advantage by manipulating the mutants, who had imprinted on him as a surrogate parent.

After a failed attempt to kill the Turtles in the junkyard using a captured Raphael, the Shredder unleashed Tokka and Rahzar onto a city street to "have fun" and destroy it. The Foot spy then gave April a message for the Turtles: that the Shredder would turn the mutants loose on Central Park next if they did not accede to a rematch at the construction site. After the Turtles de-mutate the two mutants (with help from Perry) and defeat Tatsu in a nightclub, the Shredder appears and threatens to mutate an innocent woman with a mutagen vial. Before he can mutate her, he is stopped when the Turtles play a keytar at full volume, sending the Shredder flying through a window from the force of a blown speaker. When the Turtles follow him outside on a pier, they discover that the Shredder has used the mutagen vial on himself. He is transformed into a massive "Super Shredder", an almost mindless giant-mutant being with immense strength. During his fight with the Turtles, Super Shredder in his furious desire to bring down the turtles with him knocks down the pier's pilings in a mindless rage, which then collapses onto him.

=== Teenage Mutant Ninja Turtles (2014) ===
Tohoru Masamune portrayed the Shredder in Teenage Mutant Ninja Turtles. Initially, William Fichtner was intended to portray a Caucasian version of the Shredder, with the anglicized real name of Eric Sacks, instead of Oroku Saki. This idea was abandoned late in production in favor of featuring a Shredder of authentic Japanese ancestry, and the film went through re-shoots to change Fichtner's character of Sacks into being the Shredder's student. The change came too late to alter the film's Nintendo 3DS tie-in video game, and Sacks remains the Shredder in it. In contrast to much of the brand's history, Sacks, not Shredder, is the character connected to the Turtles' origins, having created them alongside April O'Neil's father; the Shredder (never referred to with any name other than his codename) has no connection to Splinter or the Turtles, and while he is shown to have scars on his face, it is not revealed how he suffered them.

In the earliest stages of development for the film, the Shredder was reimagined as "Colonel Schrader", the military leader of the black-ops unit "The Foot", revealed later in the script to be a yellow-skinned, red-eyed alien with the ability to sprout spikes. This idea was dropped after Evan Daugherty was hired to rewrite the script in early 2013.

In the film, the Shredder is the leader of the Foot Clan, who is terrorizing New York City. After a vigilante stops the Foot Clan, the Shredder orders the Foot to take hostages down the subway in order to lure the vigilante out. Later in the film, the Shredder's adopted son, Eric Sacks, informs Shredder that the vigilante is in fact four mutated Turtles who are test subjects of Project Renaissance, a science experiment of April O'Neil's late father. Sacks give Shredder an armed suit and a helmet, the latter and the Foot Clan attack the Turtles' lair, where he defeats Splinter and kidnaps three Turtles after Raphael was presumed dead. Sacks drains the Turtles' blood in order to create a mutagen so that he can complete his and Shredder's plan: the latter will release a virus across the city and Sacks will sell the mutagen as a cure for the disease, making him even richer. As the Shredder prepares to release the virus, the Turtles escape and confront him. Although he nearly defeats them, the Turtles were able to conquer the Shredder with the help of April, which causes him to fall from the building on which he stood, but he survives and is shown to have a sample of the mutagen.

=== Teenage Mutant Ninja Turtles: Out of the Shadows (2016) ===
Brian Tee portrayed the Shredder in the 2016 film Teenage Mutant Ninja Turtles: Out of the Shadows. At the beginning of the film, the Foot Clan, led by Baxter Stockman, attempts to help the Shredder escape from prison. Although the turtles try to prevent the escape, Stockman was able to help the Shredder escape using a teleportation device. But the Shredder is hijacked mid-teleport and ends up in a place called Dimension X. There, he meets Krang, who gives the Shredder a mutagen canister in exchange for a promise to find the three components of a machine that Krang sent to Earth long ago, which when united will open a portal to his dimension. The Shredder returns to New York City and recruits two criminals named Bebop and Rocksteady and has Stockman use Krang's mutagen to transform them into powerful animal mutants- a warthog and rhinoceros. The Shredder, Bebop, and Rocksteady find the components in a museum in New York and in a jungle in Brazil. The Shredder and Stockman unite the components, creating a portal to Krang's dimension. The Shredder betrays Stockman and has his men take him away, but upon entering the Technodrome, Krang immediately betrays the Shredder, freezing him and locking him away with his collection of other defeated foes.

=== Batman vs. Teenage Mutant Ninja Turtles (2019) ===
Andrew Kishino voices the Shredder in the crossover animated film Batman vs. Teenage Mutant Ninja Turtles. In the film, the Shredder allies his forces with Ra's al Ghul and the League of Assassins to build a machine designed to transform Gotham's citizens into unhinged mutants. In exchange for his assistance, Ra's promises the Shredder access to one of his Lazarus Pits, which would grant him eternal life. When he and the Foot Clan try to steal a cloud seeder from Wayne Enterprises, he ends up fighting Batman and barely comes out victorious after using an ancient technique.

Later, he fights Batman once more when the Turtles and the Bat-Family arrive at Ace Chemicals to stop him and Ra's from activating the machine. After Michaelangelo and Donatello destroy the machine, the debris sends the Shredder into a vat of chemicals as the plant explodes. In the post-credits scene, he is revealed to have survived the explosion, which gave him an appearance and maniacal behavior similar to the Joker.

=== Teenage Mutant Ninja Turtles: Mutant Mayhem (2023) ===
The Shredder makes a silent cameo appearance in the post-credits scene of Teenage Mutant Ninja Turtles: Mutant Mayhem, where TCRI executive Cynthia Utrom plans to hire him to recapture the Ninja Turtles.

== Video games ==
As the original TMNT video games are mostly based on the 1987 animated series, the Shredder is often based on that series' incarnation of the character. He usually executes some plan to provoke the Turtles into retaliating and defeat them; these include kidnapping April O'Neil and stealing the Statue of Liberty. The Shredder is usually the last boss in the games.

- Teenage Mutant Ninja Turtles (NES, 1989): The Shredder is the final boss. He is found at the end of the Technodrome level. He causes the Turtles to lose roughly half their energy if he touches them, and has a gun that can de-mutate them, which instantly kills them. He wears a red costume like in the Mirage comics.
- Teenage Mutant Ninja Turtles (arcade, 1989): Once again, the Shredder is the final boss and is found at the end of the Technodrome level. He is armed with a sword, and has the ability to clone himself. The Shredder and his clones also have the ability to shoot lightning bolts from a device on the helmet, which de-mutate the Turtles they hit, killing them.
- Teenage Mutant Ninja Turtles: Fall of the Foot Clan (1990): This game was the first one not to feature the Shredder as the final boss. Instead, the Shredder is the boss of the penultimate stage, which is set in a river. It is also the first game in which the Shredder does not have the ability to de-mutate the Turtles. His only attack is a sword swipe, but he can teleport if hit. The final boss is Krang.
- Teenage Mutant Ninja Turtles: The Manhattan Missions (1991): In this PC game, the Shredder fights the turtles in his Manhattan hideout, decorated in a Japanese style. His appearance is based on the Mirage comic version.
- Teenage Mutant Ninja Turtles III: The Manhattan Project (1992): This game is the first to feature both a battle against the Shredder and a second one against a mutated Super Shredder. The first battle takes place at the end of the Technodrome level, which is the sixth of the eight levels of the game. In this battle, the Shredder uses a sword to attack the Turtles. The Shredder later returns as the final boss of the game, on the stage set in Krang's spacecraft. This time, he mutates himself into Super Shredder, much as he did in the second film which had been released earlier the same year (1991). Super Shredder has two superpowers, the ability to call down lightning, and the ability to shoot fireballs. These fireballs can de-mutate the Turtles, but unlike other games, this is not an instant kill.
- Teenage Mutant Ninja Turtles II: Back from the Sewers (1991): A sequel to Fall of the Foot Clan, this game also features the Shredder as a regular level boss and Krang as the final boss. He does not have the ability to de-mutate the Turtles, but he does have a wider variety of attacks than in the previous Game Boy game. Shredder returns later in his mutated Super Shredder form, as a sub-level boss of the final Technodrome level. However, in this incarnation, his only super-power is the ability to teleport elsewhere on the screen. He attacks the Turtles using a sword.
- Teenage Mutant Ninja Turtles: Turtles in Time (1991): the Shredder is again the final boss of the game, and found in the Technodrome. However, this time, he is not preceded by a Technodrome level. Instead, the Turtles fight through a Starbase level in the future (2100 AD) with Krang as boss, then teleport to the Technodrome in the present (1991 in the arcade game and 1992 in the SNES version) for the final confrontation. The Shredder attacks with a sword, and can fire energy attacks. In the SNES port of the game, the Shredder begins the battle by mutating himself into Super Shredder and has the added superpowers of super-speed movement, fire ground attacks, ice air attacks, and a de-mutating fireball which costs a turtle a life. The SNES port also added a Technodrome level earlier in the game, which leads to a battle with a regular Shredder. In this battle, the Shredder is in a kind of battle tank, armed with a machine gun and claws. The player views the action over the Shredder's shoulder inside the tank, and the only way to cause damage is to hurl the never-ending waves of Foot Soldiers toward the screen and into the tank.
- Teenage Mutant Ninja Turtles: The Hyperstone Heist (1992): This game uses a Super Shredder similar to the one in Turtles in Time. His attacks are roughly the same.
- Teenage Mutant Ninja Turtles III: Radical Rescue (1993): Unlike its two predecessors, Fall of the Foot Clan and Back from the Sewers, this game does feature the Shredder as the final boss. However, this time the Shredder has become Cyber Shredder, half-man, and half-machine. This form of the Shredder possessed deadly kick moves and energy ball attacks, as well as being the only boss in the game with two life meters, as the meter instantly refills after it is drained the first time.
- Teenage Mutant Ninja Turtles: Tournament Fighters (1993): This is the first game in which the Shredder is not a boss but instead a regular playable character. Furthermore, his costume is based on the Mirage comics version. Finally, in the SNES incarnation of this game, he appears under the name Cyber-Shredder, but there is no indication that he has become a cybernetic being as in Radical Rescue.

After a 10-year hiatus, a new series of TMNT games was initiated. These new games are based on the 2003 animated series.

- Teenage Mutant Ninja Turtles (2003): the Shredder appears as the final boss. The Turtles face him on the helicarrier at the top of the Foot Helicarriers; he wields the Sword of Tengu in this fight. The Shredder's combo attacks are quick and nearly continuous. When half of his health bar has been depleted, his attacks become much faster. There is also a secret final boss in which the player faces the Shredder as Oroku Saki. His combos are much quicker and deadlier, and he also has a temporary powered-up state.
- Teenage Mutant Ninja Turtles 2: Battle Nexus (2004): The game begins a short while before the end of the previous game, and the Shredder is encountered by the Turtles in the second stage of the game; however, he is not fought by the player, only in a cutscene. As in the series, the Shredder is defeated, but he survives the assault on his headquarters. The Shredder resurfaces in the TCRI building later on, but once again, the player does not directly fight him; the main goal of the mission being to evacuate the Utroms back to their home planet. He is seemingly killed in the destruction of the TCRI building, but he once again survives. In a subplot exclusive to the game, he is detailed as being a mass murderer of Utroms on their homeworld, and he gave Utrom mercenary Slashuur a permanent scar. He later employed an amnesiac Slashuur to kill the Turtles. However, Slashuur eventually remembers his past, and with the Turtles, battles the Shredder and the Foot on his ship. The Turtles eventually defeat the Shredder once again. In the Battle Nexus fighting tournament mode, the Shredder appears as the final boss of the Foot Fight tournament, though the nature of these tournaments when it comes to the game's canon is questionable.
- Teenage Mutant Ninja Turtles: Mutant Melee (2005): the Shredder appeared as a playable character and opponent in three forms—his standard armor, without the armor (as Oroku Saki), and a golden "Mega" Shredder.
- Teenage Mutant Ninja Turtles 3: Mutant Nightmare (2005) The third chapter of the game, "Exodus", deals directly with the Turtles thwarting the Foot's efforts. As in the third-season finale, the Turtles and Splinter battle the Foot at their headquarters, and follow the Shredder aboard his starship. They nearly sacrifice themselves to kill the Shredder as well, but the Utroms rescue them, and exile the Shredder to a distant ice asteroid forever. The Shredder is also encountered in the dark future as one of the final bosses of the Nightmare chapter of the game.
- TMNT (2007): In the console versions of the 2007 film-based game, the Shredder appears as a boss in a flashback-within-a-flashback (as the events of the game are told to Splinter after their occurrence). The armor of Shredder in this game is based on the 2003 animated series version.
- TMNT: Smash Up (2009): the Shredder is a playable character in the PS2 and Wii fighting game. He appears in both his Utrom Shredder and Cyber Shredder forms.
- Teenage Mutant Ninja Turtles: Out of the Shadows (2013): the Shredder appears as both the penultimate and final boss of the game. He recruits Baxter Stockman to build a new helmet for him using stolen Krang technology, which gives him telekinetic powers, including the ability to fly. The Shredder is first fought in his lair when the Turtles come to save April and learn about his scheme. After escaping, he has fought again in the Krangs' secret underground facility, this time donning his new helmet built by Stockman. He is ultimately defeated by the Turtles, who destroy his helmet, leaving him to swear revenge.
- Teenage Mutant Ninja Turtles (2014): The Nintendo 3DS game based on the 2014 film, the Shredder, who is actually Eric Sacks, appears as the final boss. However, after defeating him, it is revealed that it was all an illusion created by Baxter Stockman, to allow the real Shredder to escape.
- Nickelodeon Kart Racers (2018): the Shredder appears as a non-playable background character in the Teenage Mutant Ninja Turtles tracks, based on the 2012 incarnation.
- Nickelodeon Kart Racers 2: Grand Prix (2020): the Shredder appears as a playable driver, once again based on his 2012 appearance.
- Nickelodeon All-Star Brawl (2021): the Shredder appears as a playable character as part of a free update, based on his 1987 appearance.
- The Shredder appears as a boss in the 2022 beat-'em-up Teenage Mutant Ninja Turtles: Shredder's Revenge. He is first fought in his usual form, then appears again as the final boss as Super Shredder.

== Other appearances ==
In the anime adaptation Mutant Turtles: Choujin Densetsu-hen, the backstory from the original animated series was preserved. Unlike the rest of the main cast, the Shredder's appearance was changed to match the Supermutants Shredder toy that was being sold at that time. The manga explained this by saying his original outfit was destroyed in a battle with the Turtles and Krang created the new armor for him. The Shredder also gains the ability to transform into the dragon Devil Shredder using the Mutanite crystals he stole from the Neutrinos. With the energy from the evil sprite Dark Mu, he was later able to transform into the gigantic Dark Devil Shredder. In the second volume of the anime, he gets his Tiger Spirit Metal Mutant armor. He was voiced by Kiyoyuki Yanada.

The Shredder also made a guest appearance in an episode of the YouTube show Death Battle. In the episode, his weapons and abilities were analyzed against X-Men villain Silver Samurai. In the end, the Shredder proved himself the better fighter and beat his opponent.

The Shredder appears as a limited-time purchasable character for the KorTac faction in the first-person shooter video game Call of Duty: Modern Warfare II. This version of the character is based on the original comic book appearance.

A Colonel Ch'rell appears in the IDW comics as a member of the Utrom military, kept in stasis in the Technodrome.

In the 2022 direct-to-streaming Disney+ film Chip 'n Dale: Rescue Rangers, an arm from the 2003 Shredder appears as one of the components in Sweet Pete's amalgamated form. Jim Cummings, who was an understudy for the Shredder in the 1987 series, briefly reprised his role and provides Sweet Pete's voice during his fight with Chip and Dale, credited as "Shredder Arm".

In 2024, the Shredder appeared in Fortnite as a mini pass skin for the TMNT collaboration
