= Jeremy Howard (actor) =

American actor

- Born: Jeremy Patrick Howard; June 12, 1981 (age 45); Burbank, California, U.S.
- Occupation: Actor
- Years active: 1992–present

Jeremy Patrick Howard (born June 12, 1981) is an American actor. He appeared in the films Sydney White, Galaxy Quest, Accepted, How the Grinch Stole Christmas, and more recently Teenage Mutant Ninja Turtles and Teenage Mutant Ninja Turtles: Out of the Shadows, where he performed the motion capture and voice for Donatello.

== Early life ==
Howard was born in Burbank, California, the son of actor Joe Howard.

== Filmography ==
Year	Title	Role	Notes
1992	Crash Landing: The Rescue of Flight 232	Tony Feeney	TV movie
1995	The Cure	Tyler's Buddy #2	
1995	...And the Earth Did Not Swallow Him	Bucktooth Kid	
1999	Galaxy Quest	Kyle	
2000	The Drew Carey Show	Robert Gates	Episode: "Oswald's Son"
2000	How the Grinch Stole Christmas	Drew Lou Who	
2001	Undeclared	Totem Pole	Episode: "Hell Week"; Episode: "Rush and Pledge"
2002	Just Shoot Me!	Terry	Episode: "Blind Ambition"
2002	Men in Black II	Bird Guy Alien / Postal Sorting Alien	
2002	Buffy the Vampire Slayer	Dead Nerd	Episode: "Lessons"
2002	Hidden Hills	Store Clerk	Episode: "The Vasectomy"
2002	Catch Me If You Can	Teen Waiter	
2003	Malcolm in the Middle	Ethan	Episode: "Stereo Store"
2003	The Haunted Mansion	Hitchhiking Ghost	
2004	Soccer Dog: European Cup	Dickie	
2005	Wiener Park	Dennis Park	TV movie
2005	Judging Amy	Waiter	Episode: "Silent Era"
2005	Scrubs	Fat Frank	Episode: "My Life in Four Cameras"
2005	Fielder's Choice	Cashier	TV movie
2005	Entourage	Nerd #2	Episode: "I Love You Too"
2006	My Name is Earl	Jeff Muskin	Episode: "O Karma, Where Art Thou?"
2006	Lady in the Water	Tartutic #1	
2006	Accepted	Freaky Student	
2006	Dorm Daze 2	Eli	
2007	Happy Deathday	Jeremy	
2007	John from Cincinnati	Gary	Episode: "His Visit: Day One"
2007	Sydney White	Terrence	
2008	Jane Doe: Eye of the Beholder	Joe Buckbee	TV movies
2008	Black Widow	Henry	TV movies
2009	He's Such a Girl	Walt	
2009	Hotel for Dogs	Hot Dog Man	
2009	Monk	Green-Skinned Alien Enthusiast	Episode: "Mr. Monk and the UFO"
2011	Breaking Bad	Sketchy	TV series; 2 episodes
2013	The Pretty One	James	
2014–2015	Mighty Med	Phillip	Recurring Role
2014	Teenage Mutant Ninja Turtles	Donatello	Motion Capture and voice
2016	Teenage Mutant Ninja Turtles: Out of the Shadows	Donatello	Motion Capture and voice
2019–2020	Malibu Rescue	Vooch	Recurring role
2022	Super Pumped	Anthony Levandowski	TV series; 3 episodes
