= Pete Ploszek =

American actor (born 1987)

Peter Ploszek
- Born: January 20, 1987 (age 39); Hinsdale, Illinois, U.S.
- Education: Princeton University
- Occupation: Actor
- Years active: 2012–present
- Spouse: Daniela Kende (m. 2012)
- Children: 2

Peter Daniel Ploszek (born January 20, 1987) is an American actor best known for his role as Leonardo in the Teenage Mutant Ninja Turtles films. He is also known for his role as Garrett Douglas on the MTV supernatural drama series Teen Wolf.

== Early life and education ==
Ploszek was born in Hinsdale, Illinois and graduated from St. Charles East High School. In 2009, he graduated from Princeton University, where he was a four-year member of the Princeton Tigers football team. He graduated with a MFA in Acting from the USC School of Dramatic Arts in 2012.

== Career ==
In 2013, Ploszek was cast as Leonardo in the reboot of the Teenage Mutant Ninja Turtles franchise. Ploszek did initially voice Leonardo. However, prior to the film's release, his voice work was dubbed over by actor Johnny Knoxville. Ploszek did return to voice Leonardo in the sequel to the 2016 film, Teenage Mutant Ninja Turtles: Out of the Shadows.

In 2016, he published his first book, "Get Fast and Crush the Combine".

== Filmography ==
=== Film ===
Year	Title	Role	Notes
2012	Outage: WME	Colin Reno's Assistant	Short film
2014	Teenage Mutant Ninja Turtles	Leonardo	Motion capture
2016	Teenage Mutant Ninja Turtles: Out of the Shadows	Leonardo	Motion capture and voice
2016	The Wedding Party	Zeb	
2017	I Want to Know	Cole	Short film
2019	Captain Marvel	Bret Johnson	
2019	Terminator: Dark Fate	Ackers	
2020	Honesty Weekend	Nate Falco	
2022	Fatal Fandom	Jackson Reed	
2022	Babylon	Young Actor (Jack's Beach Set)	
2024	Destroy All Neighbors	Alec	
2025	The Surrender	Young Robert	
TBA	Lavender Man	Abe	
TBA	Maverick	Sebastian Price	TV film

=== Television ===
Year	Title	Role	Notes
2012	Parks and Recreation	Ellis	Episode: "Soda Tax"
2013	Shameless	Goff	Episode: "El Gran Cañon"
2014	TakePart Live	Himself	Season 3, Episode 67
2015	Workaholics	Brock	Episode: "Dorm Daze"
2016–2017	Teen Wolf	Garrett Douglas	7 episodes
2017	Stitchers	Nic Comenko	Episode: "For Love or Money"
2018	Liberty Crossing	Steven Hathaway	8 episodes
2018	9-1-1	Connor	Episode: "Full Moon (Creepy AF)"
2018	Superstore	Dr. Sidian	Episode: "Delivery Day"
2020	Tommy	Adam Reed	Episode: "In Dreams Begin Responsibilities"
2025	You	Harrison Jacobs	6 episodes
