= Brian Tee =

Japanese and American actor (born 1977)

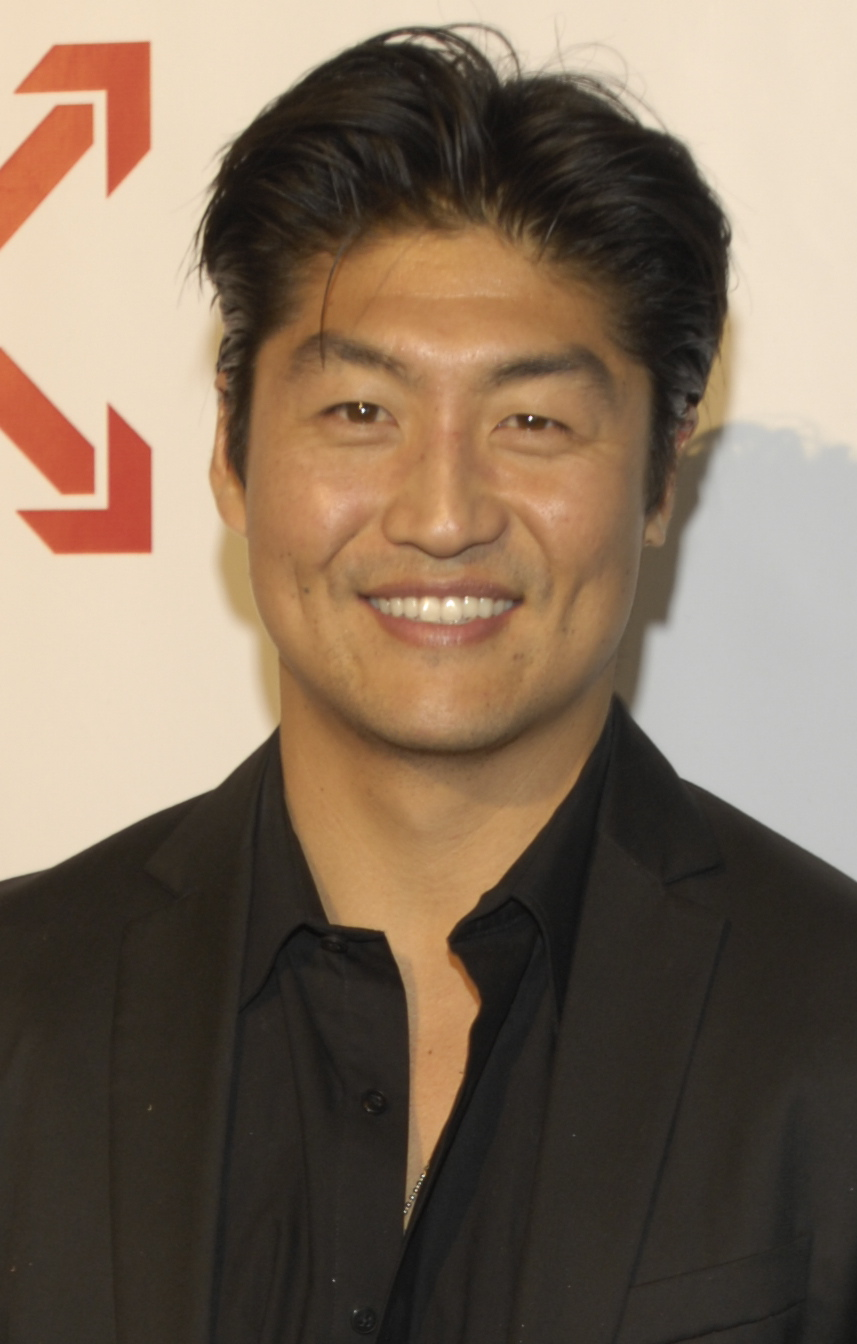
- Tee in 2011
- Born: Jae-Beom Takata 高田 ジェボム; March 15, 1977 (age 49); Okinawa, Japan
- Citizenship: United States
- Education: University of California, Berkeley
- Occupation: Actor
- Years active: 2000–present
- Spouse: Mirelly Taylor
- Children: 1

Jae-Beom Takata (高田 ジェボム, Takata Jebomu; born March 15, 1977) (Note: Japanese pronunciation: [takada dʑe̞bo̞mɯ]; alternatively 다카타 재범, Hepburn: Takada Jebomu, Korean pronunciation: [takʰa̠tʰa̠ dʑɛ̝bʌ̹m]), known professionally as Brian Tee, is a Japanese-born American actor. Born in Okinawa, Tee immigrated with his family to California when he was 2 years old. He attended the University of California and began pursuing his television career. He voices Jiro from Adult Swim's Get Jiro. His first appearance on the small screen came in 2000 when he had a small role on the television series The Pretender. He went on to appear in the television series Entourage, Grey's Anatomy, and had a recurring role on Zoey 101. From 2015 to 2022, Tee starred in the first eight seasons of NBC's Chicago Med as Dr. Ethan Choi.

In 2006, Tee was cast as the antagonist D.K. (Drift King) in the action film The Fast and the Furious: Tokyo Drift. He has since appeared in The Wolverine (2013) and Jurassic World (2015). His other films include No Tears for the Dead (2014), and Teenage Mutant Ninja Turtles: Out of the Shadows (2016), where he portrayed Shredder. In 2013, he portrayed Liu Kang in the web series Mortal Kombat: Legacy. He portrayed Xavier Quinn/Julius McCabe in season 3 of the Amazon's Reacher.

== Early life ==
Jae-Beom Takata was born on March 15, 1977 in Okinawa Prefecture, Japan, to a Japanese-American father from Los Angeles and a Korean mother from Seoul. His father was born in a Japanese concentration camp during World War II, while his mother was living in Japan working as a reporter. At the age of two, he moved to California, and was raised in Hacienda Heights. He attended Glen A. Wilson High School where he was an Associated Student Body president and captain of the football team.

Tee graduated from University of California, Berkeley with a degree in theater and performing arts. Not long after graduating, he adopted his "culturally ambiguous" stage name Brian Tee after being rejected by a Korean director at an audition for having a Japanese last name.

== Career ==
Tee played Kazu, the owner of Sushi Rox, on Nickelodeon's Zoey 101. He played Eddie Choi in Crash. He starred as Akira Kimura on Grimm and Takeda on Burn Notice. He appeared in the Season 4 episode "The Girl in the Mask" as Ken Nakamura on the series Bones. He played Dwayne Archimedes in the indie Feature film Roswell FM. Tee appeared in an episode in the first season of the television series Dark Blue as a Korean criminal. He has a short part in Austin Powers in Goldmember as a pedestrian who has a brief comic exchange with another man (played by Masi Oka) over the legality of calling a giant monster "Godzilla". Tee can also be seen as a contestant on an episode of Hollywood Squares hosted by Tom Bergeron. He played in 1999 against a woman named Heidi.

Tee was also in the music video "Dance Like Michael Jackson" by Far East Movement.

In James Mangold's The Wolverine (2013), starring Hugh Jackman, Tee played Noburo Mori, a sadistic minister of justice arranged to marry the daughter of Yakuza Boss Shingen Yashida (Hiroyuki Sanada).. Tee took on the role of Liu Kang in the YouTube series Mortal Kombat Legacy.

One of Tee's most famous roles was as "D.K." Takashi "Drift King" in the 3rd installment of the Fast & Furious series The Fast and the Furious: Tokyo Drift (2006). Tee appeared in the television film The Gabby Douglas Story on October 18, 2013, where he played her coach Liang Chow, which aired in 2014 on Lifetime.

Tee co-starred in the 2015 film Jurassic World where he played Hamada, a high-ranking commander who works for the Asset Containment Unit (ACU).

Tee played Shredder in Teenage Mutant Ninja Turtles: Out of the Shadows, the 2016 sequel to Teenage Mutant Ninja Turtles where the role was previously portrayed by Tohoru Masamune.

On July 20, 2015, Tee signed on to co-star in the NBC medical drama Chicago Med as Dr. Ethan Choi. He had previously appeared on its sister show Chicago P.D. as a Chinese gangster in Season 2. In October 2022, it was confirmed that Tee would be exiting Chicago Med after eight seasons.

On March 6, 2024, Tee was cast as Lieutenant Colonel Francis Xavier Quinn / Julius McCabe, traitorous U.S. military intelligence officer turned arms dealer, in the third season of Reacher, which premiered in February 2025.

== Personal life ==
Besides English, Tee speaks fluent Japanese and proficient Korean. He is married to actress Mirelly Taylor, with whom he has a daughter born in 2015.

== Filmography ==
Key
†	Denotes films that have not yet been released

=== Film ===
Year	Title	Role	Notes
2000	What Planet Are You From?	Alien	Uncredited
2002	We Were Soldiers	PFC. Jimmy Nakayama	
2002	Austin Powers in Goldmember	Japanese Pedestrian	
2004	Starship Troopers 2: Hero of the Federation	Cpl. Thom Kobe	
2005	Fun with Dick and Jane	Sushi Chef	
2006	All In	Rosenbloom Player 2	
2006	The Fast and the Furious: Tokyo Drift	Takashi "D.K."	
2007	Finishing the Game	Mac Chang	
2008	The Trade	Mr. Cho	
2009	Deadland	Jax	
2009	Chain Letter	Brian Yee	
2009	Wedding Palace	Jason	
2013	The Wolverine	Noburo Mori	
2014	The Gabby Douglas Story	Liang Chow	
2014	No Tears for the Dead	Chaoz	
2015	Jurassic World	Hamada	
2016	Teenage Mutant Ninja Turtles: Out of the Shadows	Oroku Saki/The Shredder	
2017	The Beautiful Ones	Casper	
2025	A House of Dynamite	SAIC Ken Cho	

=== Television ===
Year	Title	Role	Notes
2000	The Pretender	Male Agent	Episode: "The Agent of Year Zero"
2000	The Invisible Man	Mallon	Episode: "The Value of Secrets"
2000	Buffy the Vampire Slayer	Intern	Episode: "Family"
2001	Family Law	DEA Agent	Episode: "Liar's Club: Part 1"
2001	18 Wheels of Justice	Host	Episode: "The Game"
2001	The Chronicle	Neo	Episode: "Here There Be Dragons"
2002	Flipside	Lance	Episode: "Pilot"
2003	JAG	North Korean Soldier	Episode: "Close Quarters"
2004	Passions	Young Asian Man	Episode: "#1.1217"
2004	Cracking Up	Frat Guy #1	Episode: "Daddy's Home"
2004	Monk	James Lu	Episode: "Mr. Monk Meets the Godfather"
2004	Tiger Cruise	MA2 Chan	Television film
2005	Without a Trace	Kirk	Episode: "Transitions"
2005	Wanted	Jin-Lee Park	Episode: "Rubbing One Out"
2005–08	Zoey 101	Kazu	6 episodes
2006	The Unit	Rebel Leader	Episode: "200th Hour"
2006	Entourage	Fukijama's Bodyguard	Episode: "What About Bob?"
2007	Grey's Anatomy	Andy Meltzer	2 episodes
2007	Pandemic	Danny	Miniseries
2008	Jericho	Cheung	Episode: "Patriots and Tyrants"
2008–09	Crash	Eddie Choi	13 episodes
2009	Lie to Me	Han Yong-Dae	Episode: "Love Always"
2009	Bones	Ken Nakamura	Episode: "The Girl in the Mask"
2009	Dark Blue	Kang	Episode: "K-Town"
2010	Sym-Bionic Titan	Mike Chan (voice)	Episode: "Roar of the White Dragon"
2011	Burn Notice	Takeda	Episode: "Bloodlines"
2012	Shake It Up	Mr. Itou	Episode: "Made in Japan"
2012–13	Grimm	Akira Kimura	3 episodes
2013	Hawaii Five-0	Ryu Nabushi/Hideaki Kuroda	Episode: "Kupouli 'la"
2014	Agents of S.H.I.E.L.D.	Toshiro Mori	Episode: "A Fractured House"
2014	One Christmas Eve	Dr. Chen	TV movie
2015	Chicago P.D.	Jesse Kong	Episode: "The Three Gs"
2015	Baby Daddy	Tommy Kwan	Episode: "It Takes a Village Idiot"
2015–25	Chicago Med	Dr. Ethan Choi	Main role (seasons 1–8); Director: 3 episodes (seasons 8–10)
2016–18	Chicago Fire	Dr. Ethan Choi	Recurring role
2016–18	Chicago P.D.	Dr. Ethan Choi	Recurring role
2018	Lucifer	Ben Rogers	Episode: "Once Upon a Time"
2021–25	Star Wars: Visions	Ronin (voice)	Short film: The Duel: English dub Short film: The Duel: Payback: English dub
2024	Expats	Clarke	Miniseries, main cast
2025	Reacher	Francis Xavier Quinn/Julius McCabe	Main role, season 3
2026	Doc	Bobby Ho	Episode: "Trust"
2026	Get Jiro	Jiro (voice)	Lead role
TBA	The Scapegoat †	—N/a	Anthology series, producer

=== Web ===
Year	Title	Role	Notes
2013	Mortal Kombat: Legacy	Liu Kang	4 episodes

=== Video games ===
Year	Title	Voice role	Notes
2008	Saints Row 2	Jyunichi	

=== Music videos ===
Year	Title	Artist	Notes
2006	"Conteo"	Don Omar	
2008	"Dance Like Michael Jackson"	Far East Movement	
