= Dave Green (director) =

American filmmaker (born 1983)

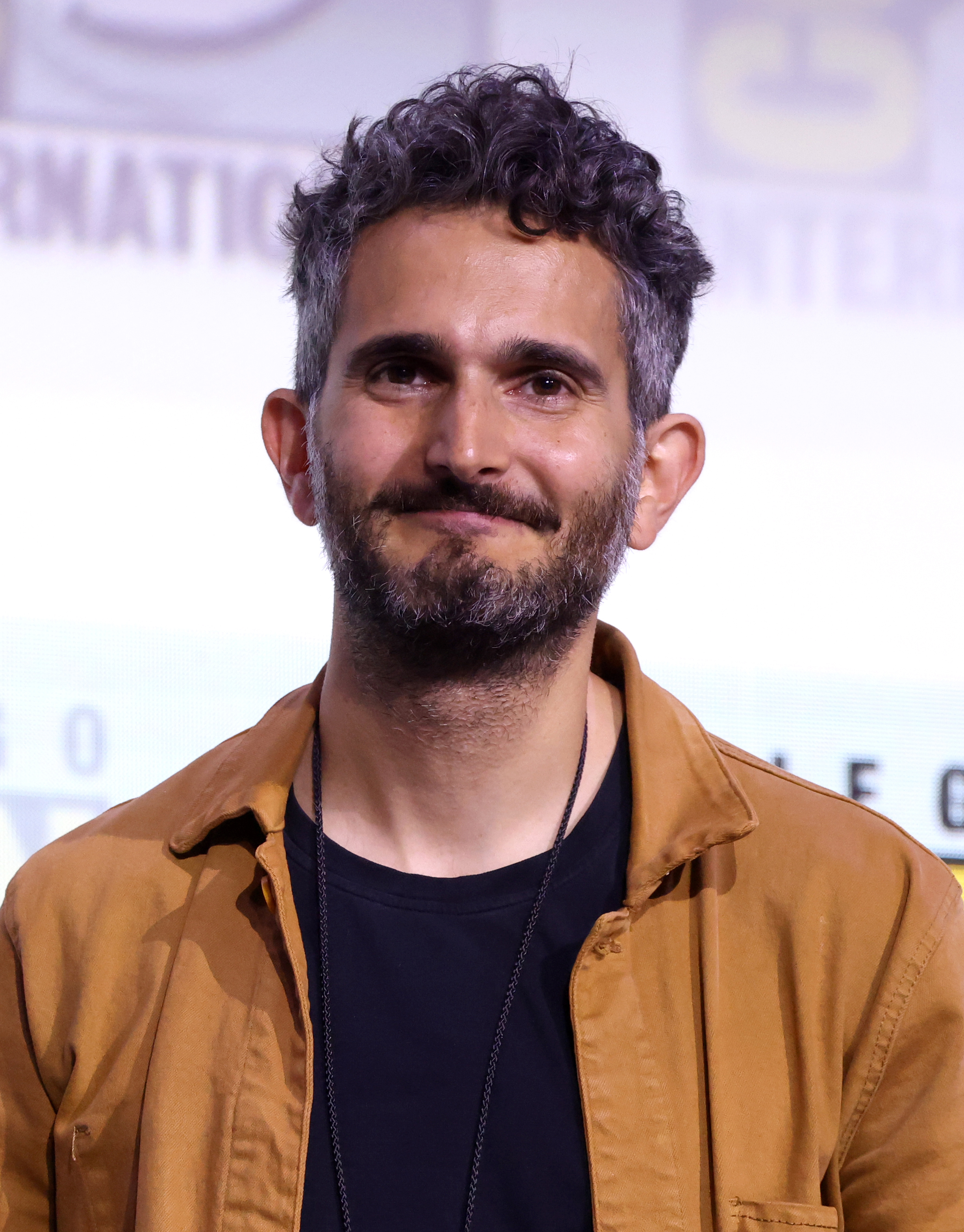
- Green in 2025
- Born: 1983 (age 42–43); United States
- Occupation: Director
- Years active: 2002–present
- Notable work: Earth to Echo; Teenage Mutant Ninja Turtles: Out of the Shadows; Coyote vs. Acme

David Green (born 1983) is an American film and music video director. He is well known for directing several music videos and short films, especially working with Miles Fisher. After making his directorial debut with the 2014 film Earth to Echo, he went on to direct other films such as Teenage Mutant Ninja Turtles: Out of the Shadows (2016) and later the Warner Animation Group film Coyote vs. Acme (2026).

== Career ==
Green directed several music videos, including Miles Fisher's 2009 cover of Talking Heads' "This Must Be the Place". He also co-directed the short animated comedy film Meltdown in 2009 with David Cross, in which David Cross voiced over the main role.

In 2010, Green directed a short film spoof titled Pinkberry: The Movie, starring Miles Fisher. Later, he directed a television short series, Zombie Roadkill, starring Thomas Haden Church and produced by Sam Raimi.

In 2011, Green and Fisher made a viral short film New Romance along with Jake Avnet to promote Final Destination 5. Later, he directed another short film, Dial M for Murder, for the Funny or Die.

On 22 May 2012, Walt Disney Pictures set Green to make his directorial debut with a science-fiction adventure film entitled Earth to Echo, scripted by Henry Gayden, produced by Andrew Panay, and starring Astro, Reese Hartwig, and Teo Halm. The film was released on 2 July 2014, grossing more than $45 million. Disney sold the film's rights to Relativity Media in 2013.

In August 2013, Warner Bros. Pictures set Green to direct sci-fi action film Lore, based on the graphic novel of the same name, written by Ashley Wood and T.P. Louise, that Warner Bros. had gained in 2012.

On 4 December 2014, Green was set by Paramount Pictures to direct Teenage Mutant Ninja Turtles: Out of the Shadows, a sequel to the successful 2014 film Teenage Mutant Ninja Turtles directed by Jonathan Liebesman. Filming began in April 2015 in New York City and Buffalo. and the film was released on 3 June 2016.

In December 2019, Green was set to direct Coyote vs. Acme, a live-action/animated hybrid film based on Looney Tunes character Wile E. Coyote, for Warner Bros. Pictures. Filming took place in Albuquerque, New Mexico from March to May 2022. The film had been originally scheduled for release on 21 July 2023, before losing the slot to Greta Gerwig's Barbie in April 2022. In November 2023, parent company Warner Bros. Discovery announced that the film would be shelved in order to take a $30 million tax write-off. Following public backlash, Green and his collaborators were allowed to shop the film to other distributors, with Paramount Pictures, Amazon MGM Studios, Apple Studios and Netflix taking interest on the project. After several unsuccessful negotiations, the film remained in limbo. In March 2025, independent distributor Ketchup Entertainment acquired worldwide rights to the film for $50 million, aiming to release in 2026. That July, during San Diego Comic-Con, the film was announced to be scheduled for worldwide release on 28 August 2026.

In August 2025, Green was set to direct Hex for 20th Century Studios, based on an original screenplay by his friend and collaborator BenDavid Grabinski.

== Filmography ==
=== Director ===
Film
| Year | Title | Distributor | Ref. |
|---|---|---|---|
| 2014 | Earth to Echo | Relativity Media | |
| 2016 | Teenage Mutant Ninja Turtles: Out of the Shadows | Paramount Pictures | |
| 2026 | Coyote vs. Acme | Ketchup Entertainment | |

Short film
| Year | Title | Ref. |
|---|---|---|
| 2009 | Meltdown | |
| 2010 | Pinkberry: The Movie | |
| 2011 | Ham Sandwich | |
| 2011 | New Romance | |
| 2011 | Dial M for Murder | |
| 2012 | Staff Meeting: The Movie | |

Video
| Year | Title |
|---|---|
| 2018 | Five Points: Viral Video |
| 2023 | Lowe's: Plants |

Music video
| Year | Title |
|---|---|
| 2009 | Miles Fisher: This Must Be the Place |
| 2012 | T. J. Miller |

Television
| Year | Title |
|---|---|
| 2010 | Zombie Roadkill |

=== Non-directing roles ===
| Year | Title | Medium | Details |
|---|---|---|---|
| 2002 | Gruel Game | Film | Production assistant |
| 2004 | Spider-Man 2 | Film | Production assistant |
| 2007 | Spider-Man 3 | Film | Production assistant |
| 2011 | Minor Stars | TV Series | Camera Operator |
| 2015 | Best of the Worst | TV Series | Camera Operator |
| 2018 | Five Points: Viral Video | Video | Creative Consultant (see also video director) |
