= Earth to Echo =

2014 film directed by Dave Green

- Theatrical release poster
- Directed by: Dave Green
- Screenplay by: Henry Gayden
- Story by: Henry Gayden; Andrew Panay
- Produced by: Ryan Kavanaugh; Andrew Panay
- Starring: Teo Halm; Brian "Astro" Bradley; Reese C. Hartwig; Ella Wahlestedt
- Cinematography: Maxime Alexandre
- Edited by: Crispin Struthers; Carsten Kurpanek
- Music by: Joseph Trapanese
- Production company: Panay Films
- Distributed by: Relativity Media
- Release dates: June 14, 2014 (LAFF); July 2, 2014 (United States)
- Running time: 91 minutes
- Country: United States
- Language: English
- Budget: $13 million
- Box office: $45.3 million

Earth to Echo is a 2014 American science fiction film directed by Dave Green in his theatrical directorial film debut, and produced by Ryan Kavanaugh and Andrew Panay. Based on a screenplay by Henry Gayden, the film stars Teo Halm, Brian "Astro" Bradley, Reese C. Hartwig and Ella Wahlestedt as four neighborhood friends who find a robotic, telekinetic alien in the desert, and are soon hunted by dangerous forces who seek to take the alien, who the kids name "Echo", for themselves. The film is shot in a found footage style from many perspectives, including through a handheld camera, smartphone cameras, and the alien's eyes.

The film was originally developed and produced by Walt Disney Pictures, under the leadership of Rich Ross, but Disney, dissatisfied with the project, sold the distribution rights to Relativity Media in 2013, on the advice of producer Andrew Panay. Relativity Media theatrically released the film in the United States on July 2, 2014, to mixed critical reviews and grossed $45.3 million worldwide.

== Plot ==
Three childhood friends, Alex Nichols, Tucker "Tuck" Simms, and Reginald "Munch" Barrett, live in the small Nevada neighborhood of Mulberry Woods that will soon be demolished for a highway construction project. The day before they're set to move, their phones all start displaying mysterious patterns, which Munch discovers lead to coordinates in the nearby desert. They decide to spend their last night together biking to the coordinates to investigate, recording their experience on their smartphones and video cameras.

The three arrive at the coordinates and follow the map to a dusty, rusted object under an electrical tower. They take the object with them as they follow another map to a nearby barn, where the object telekinetically repairs itself using various objects around the barn. The boys discover the object contains a cybernetic alien that can answer yes or no questions. The alien reveals it has crash landed on Earth after being shot down, seriously injured as a result. The group follows another map to a pawn shop, where the object further repairs itself. With its eyes damaged, it uses Alex's phone camera to see. As they leave the pawn shop, they decide to name the alien Echo.

They follow another map to the house of Emma Hastings, a classmate of the boys, who discovers Echo and joins their group. They follow another map to an arcade, where Alex is caught by a security guard. Emma goes back to rescue him while Echo causes a distraction. After rescuing Alex, the four stop at a restaurant, keeping Echo hidden in a backpack, but a construction worker steals the backpack and loads it into a truck. Munch jumps into the back of the truck as it pulls away, leaving the others behind. To catch up to them, Alex and Emma help Tuck steal his brother's car, which they drive to the construction site where Munch and Echo are being held.

The three sneak in, but get caught by the same construction worker, who reveals himself as Dr. Lawrence Masden, a scientist who intends to keep Echo on Earth so that he can study its technology. Masden's group is revealed as the group that shot Echo down in the first place. Masden tries convincing the kids that if Echo repairs the key to his spaceship (the object he was in) and takes off, it will kill everyone in the neighborhood; the kids pretend to be convinced, and promise to help Masden find the spaceship if he takes them to Munch and Echo. Masden brings the three to a scrap junkyard, where Echo seemingly dies from the violent experimentation inflicted on him, but with encouragement from the kids, he revives, completes his repairs, and distracts the agents long enough for the kids to drive back home.

At Alex's house, the spaceship key goes into the ground by itself, and they realize the agents invented the false construction project as a cover to dig up the neighborhood, as the entire ship is in the ground beneath it. Trusting Echo, Alex takes him down the hole made by the key. At the bottom, the group finds a room that turns out to be the spaceship's core, where the key connects to the rest of it. Once the key is connected to the core, allowing Echo to pilot the ship, he begins starting up the ship. After they all say goodbye and the kids exit the core, the ship's separate parts telekinetically come out of the ground all over the neighborhood, and reassemble it in mid-air, and all without destroying the neighborhood. Once fully reassembled, the ship flies away.

The project put on by the agents is abandoned but Alex and Munch relocate anyway, as their families have already bought new homes elsewhere. However, as Tuck's didn't, he stays, and new neighbors and residents move in to the neighborhood. Sometime later, the three and Emma meet up again, as the film ends with Alex holding up his phone towards the sky.

In a post-credit scene, Alex addresses his friends as his phone apparently starts moving and glitching out like before, implying that Echo has returned.

== Cast ==
- Teo Halm as Alex Nichols
- Brian "Astro" Bradley as Tucker "Tuck" Simms
- Reese Hartwig as Reginald "Munch" Barrett
- Ella Wahlestedt as Emma Hastings
- Jason Gray-Stanford as Dr. Lawrence Masden
- Algee Smith as Marcus Simms
- Cassius Willis as Calvin Simms
- Sonya Leslie as Theresa Simms
- Kerry O'Malley as Janice Douglas
- Virginia Louise Smith as Betty Barrett
- Peter Mackenzie as James Hastings
- Valerie Wildman as Christine Hastings
- Mary Pat Gleason as Dusty (Mullet Lady at Bar)
- Chris Wylde as Security Guard
- Brooke Dillman as Diner Waitress
- Myk Watford as Blake Douglas
- Tiffany Espensen as Charlie
- Israel Broussard as Cameron
- Sean Carroll as Podcast Voice (voice)

== Production ==
In May 2012, it was reported that Walt Disney Pictures had hired Dave Green to direct an untitled wolf adventure that Andrew Panay would produce.

Earth to Echo was commissioned by Andrew Panay, Panay Films President of Production, under the working title, Untitled Wolf Adventure, while the studio shifted leadership between Rich Ross and Alan Horn. After Horn's succession as chairman, and viewing a final cut of the film, he decided to put the film into turnaround. After producer Andrew Panay met with Relativity president Tucker Tooley, Disney eventually sold the film's distribution rights and copyrights to Relativity Media in 2013.

The producers and crew acknowledged the similarities to E.T. the Extra-Terrestrial, The Goonies, and Stand by Me while also emphasizing the differences such as the integration of social media and modern technology of contemporary youth into the story, namely through the film's usage of the Found footage style in a manner similar to Chronicle.

== Release ==
The film was initially scheduled for release on January 10, 2014, and April 25, 2014. After being delayed, Earth to Echo premiered on June 14, 2014, at the Los Angeles Film Festival and opened in theaters across the U.S. on July 2, 2014.

=== Home media ===
The film was released on DVD and Blu-ray by 20th Century Fox Home Entertainment on October 21, 2014.

== Reception ==
=== Box office ===
Earth to Echo opened on July 2, 2014, in the United States in 3,179 theaters, ranking at #6, and accumulating $8,364,658 over its 3-day opening weekend (an average of $2,590 per venue) and $13,567,557 since its Wednesday launch. As of 27 December 2014, the film had grossed $38.9 million in the U.S. and $6.4 million overseas, for a total of $45.3 million worldwide, against a $13 million budget, making it a moderate box office success.

=== Critical reception ===
On the review aggregator website Rotten Tomatoes, 49% of 126 critics' reviews are positive, with an average rating of 5.3/10. The website's consensus reads: "Earth to Echo doesn't do itself any favors by beggaring comparison to E.T., but for younger viewers, it should prove a reasonably entertaining diversion." Metacritic, which uses a weighted average, assigned the film a score of 53 out of 100, based on 31 critics, indicating "mixed or average" reviews. Audiences polled by CinemaScore gave the film an average grade of "A−" on an A+ to F scale.

=== Accolades ===
At the Teen Choice Awards, Earth to Echo received a nomination for Choice Summer Movie. Hartwig won Best Performance in a Feature Film at the 36th Young Artist Awards.

== See also ==
- List of films set in Las Vegas
