= Jeff Tymoschuk =

Canadian composer

- Origin: Souris, Manitoba, Canada
- Genres: Video game
- Occupation: Composer
- Years active: 2002–present

Jeff Tymoschuk is a Canadian composer who writes music for film, television, video games and theatrical productions. His music is often fast-paced and intense to accompany lively action sequences.

== Early life ==
Tymoschuk grew up in Souris, Manitoba.

== Career ==
In 2002, Tymoschuk wrote the musical score for the video game James Bond 007: Nightfire from Electronic Arts. He later composed additional music on James Bond 007: Everything or Nothing, supplementing composer Sean Callery’s score.

Tymoschuk has also written music for Pursuit Force: Extreme Justice for BigBig Games/Sony Computer Entertainment Europe, Penny Arcade Adventures: On the Rain-Slick Precipice of Darkness and DeathSpank from Hothead Games, and additional music on The Simpsons Hit and Run for Radical Entertainment/Vivendi Universal Games. In 2011, he composed the score for Sleeping Dogs from United Front Games, an open world game set in the Hong Kong underworld.

In 2010, he composed the score for the supernatural thriller Altitude for director Kaare Andrews and Foundation Features, starring Jessica Lowndes and Julianna Guill. Other films include Below Zero, starring Edward Furlong and Michael Berryman, and the action/horror film Tasmanian Devils, starring Danica McKellar.

Tymoschuk has created sound and music for a number of theatrical productions at the Carousel Theatre for Young People in Vancouver. In 2012, he was nominated for a Jessie Richardson Theatre Award for composition.

== Film ==
Year	Film	Studio	Director
2015	The Marine 4: Moving Target	WWE Studios/20th Century Fox	William Kaufman
2015	Mother of All Lies	Reel One Entertainment	Monika Mitchell
2014	Pants On Fire (co-composer)	Two 4 The Money Media	Jonathan A. Rosenbaum
2014	Signed, Sealed, Delivered For Christmas (additional music)	Special Delivery Teleproductions	Kevin Fair
2014	Leprechaun: Origins	WWE Studios/Lionsgate	Zach Lipovsky
2014	Heavenly Match	Front Street Pictures	Michael A. Scott
2013	Afflicted (additional music)	CBS Films	Clif Prowse & Derek Lee
2013	Window Wonderland (co-composer)	Front Street Pictures	Michael A. Scott
2012	Tasmanian Devils	Original Pictures	Zach Lipovsky
2011	Hunt for the I-5 Killer (additional music)	Bauman Entertainment	Allan Kroeker
2011	Below Zero	Twilight Pictures	Justin Thomas Ostensen
2010	Altitude	Foundation Features	Kaare Andrews
2010	Circle of Pain	Legacy Filmworks	Daniel Zirilli
2008	That One Night	Infinite Reality Productions	Rick Alyea
2007	Mr. Big	Eagle Harbour Entertainment	Tiffany Burns
2005	subHuman (co-composer)	Sonambulist Imagery	Mark Tuit
2004	The Big Bank Theory	Sea to Sky Productions	Adriane Polo
2006	Latchkey's Lament (short)	Tentaco Productions	Troy Nixey

== Television ==
Year	Title	Studio
2014	Signed, Sealed, Delivered (additional music)	Moon Water Productions/Hallmark
2013	Cedar Cove (co-composer, pilot episode)	Front Street Pictures/Hallmark
2012	Animism: The Gods' Lake	Zeroes2Heroes Media/APTN

== Video games ==
Year	Title	Studio
2015	Sleeping Dogs: Triad Wars	United Front Games/Square Enix
2012	Sleeping Dogs	United Front Games/Square Enix
2011	The Baconing	Hothead Games/Electronic Arts
2010	DeathSpank: Thongs of Virtue	Hothead Games/Electronic Arts
2010	DeathSpank	Hothead Games/Electronic Arts
2008	Penny Arcade Adventures: On the Rain-Slick Precipice of Darkness	Hothead Games
2007	Pursuit Force: Extreme Justice	BigBig Games/Sony Computer Entertainment Europe
2004	James Bond 007: Everything or Nothing (additional music)	Electronic Arts
2003	The Simpsons: Hit & Run (additional music)	Radical Entertainment/Vivendi Universal Games
2002	James Bond 007: Nightfire (co-composer)	Electronic Arts
