= Michael Dobson (actor) =

Canadian voice actor (born 1966)

- Born: August 12, 1966 (age 60); Kingston upon Thames, London, England
- Citizenship: United Kingdom; Canada
- Occupations: Voice actor; voice director
- Years active: 1992–present
- Spouse: Krista LeGresley
- Children: 4
- Relatives: Paul Dobson (brother); Brian Dobson (brother)
- Website: michaelricharddobson.com

Michael Richard Dobson (born August 12, 1966) is a British-Canadian voice actor and voice director, who works for various studios in British Columbia, Canada. He voiced Starscream in the Transformers Unicron Trilogy (Armada, Energon, and Cybertron), Supreme Kai and Nappa in the Ocean dub of Dragon Ball Z, Cobra Commander in G.I. Joe: Spy Troops and G.I. Joe: Valor vs. Venom, Blob in X-Men: Evolution, Leonardo in Ninja Turtles: The Next Mutation, Big Ears in Make Way for Noddy, Bulk Biceps in My Little Pony: Friendship Is Magic, Bull Dog in Krypto the Superdog, Pythor in Ninjago, and Will Nekton and Captain Hammerhead in The Deep.

== Early and personal life ==
Dobson was born on August 12, 1966, in Kingston upon Thames, London. He lived in both England and Canada throughout his childhood, and obtained Canadian citizenship in 1992. His younger brothers Paul Dobson and Brian Dobson are also voice actors.

He owns a voice recording studio Makena Sound Ltd. in South Surrey, British Columbia.

== Filmography ==
=== Animation ===
List of voice performances in animation
Year	Title	Role	Notes
1992	The Adventures of T-Rex	Black Knight	Debut
1994	Conan and the Young Warriors	Sukura	
1995–97	G.I. Joe Extreme	Sgt. Savage	
1996–98	Nilus the Sandman	Mr. Plintz	
1996	Waldo's Way	Waldo	
1997–99	ReBoot	Powerlock	
1998–99	Shadow Raiders	Mica, Captain Blaze	
1998–99	RoboCop: Alpha Commando	Jerry, Blipo	
1998	Fat Dog Mendoza	Cry Baby Cry Host, G. Buddy	
1998	Pocket Dragon Adventures	Shamahz	
1999–2001	Sherlock Holmes in the 22nd Century	Guest Voices	
1999	Roswell Conspiracies: Aliens, Myths and Legends	Additional Voices	
2000–01	Action Man	Desmond "Grinder" Sinclair	
2000–01	2000	Generation O!	Michael Lawrence, Artie
Capertown Cops	2000	Knucklehead	
Troll Tales	2000	Nix, Rumbletum, Gnarlyconk	
Milo's Bug Quest	2000	Ludwig	
2000–03	X-Men: Evolution	Blob / Freddy Dukes, Caliban	
2001–03	Gadget & the Gadgetinis	R2K	
2001–03	Broken Saints	Oran Bajir	
2001–02	Aaagh! It's the Mr. Hell Show!	Various characters	
2001–02	Ultimate Book of Spells	Steps the Dragon, Prince Erbert	
2001–02	Mary-Kate and Ashley in Action!	Clive Hedgemorton-Smythe	
2002	¡Mucha Lucha!	Mayor	
2002–03	Super Duper Sumos	Billy Swift, Genghis Fangus	
2002–03	Yakkity Yak	Mac, Marcus	
2003	Silverwing	Goth, Atlas	
2003	Something Else	Snoot, Something	
2005–09	Make Way for Noddy	Big Ears	US Re-Dub
2005	Alien Racers	Minister Prime Apex	
2005	Finley the Fire Engine	Suds, Lyle	
2005–08	Being Ian	Tony Parsons, Coach Folter, Rutherford, Reggie, Jailbird, Dr. Peter Clooney, Cagematch Color Commentator, Award Show Emcee, Sailor Captain, Member of Parliament, Milk Truck Driver, Mr. Mann	
2005–06	Krypto the Superdog	Bulldog	
2005–06	Firehouse Tales	Tug	
2006–07	Fantastic Four: World's Greatest Heroes	Ronan the Accuser, Mr. Bonner-Davis	
2006–08	Pucca	Ho	
2006–08	3-2-1 Penguins!	Various characters	
2006–08	Tom and Jerry Tales	Additional Voices	
2007	George of the Jungle	Monkey Master	
2007	A Kind of Magic	Mr. Lumberg	
2007	Class of the Titans	Scamander	
2007	Edgar & Ellen	Curly Brown-Haired Guy, Blake Glide, Arnold Thistle	
2008–14	Martha Speaks	Additional Voices	
2008–11	Pinky Dinky Doo	Speedy Beaver	
2008–09	Batman Black and White	Batman/Bruce Wayne, Joker, Thomas Wayne, Alfred Pennyworth, Various characters	Motion comics
2009	Dinosaur Train	The Old Spinosaurus	
2009–11	Hot Wheels Battle Force 5	Lord Zemerik, Kytren, A.J. Dalton, Boralis, Sol, Tors-10	
2011	Iron Man: Armored Adventures	Ghost	
2012–22	Lego Ninjago: Masters of Spinjitzu	Pythor, Skalidor	
2012–16	Slugterra	Millard Milford, Organizer, Malvolio Drake, Various characters	
2012	The New Adventures of Peter Pan	Captain Hook	
2013–17	My Little Pony: Friendship Is Magic	Bulk Biceps, Dr. Caballeron, Crescent Moon, Jeff Letrotski	
2013	Animism	Declan Gray, Elder #4, Hive Mind	
2013	Ultimate Wolverine vs. Hulk	Hulk, Panda, Murphy	Motion comic
2013–15	Max Steel	Forge Ferrus, Dr. Thornhill, Vin, Additional Voices	
2014	Wolverine versus Sabretooth	Romulus	Motion comic
2015–19	The Deep	Will Nekton & Captain Hammerhead	
2016	Beat Bugs	Mr. Kite	
2017	Tarzan and Jane	Clayton	
2017	Marvel Super Hero Adventures	Ultron, Absorbing Man	
2020–21	My Little Pony: Pony Life	Bulk Biceps	
2022	Team Zenko Go	Ken Kablam	

=== Anime English dubbing ===
List of English dubbing performances in anime
Year	Title	Role	Crew Role, Notes
1994	Tico of the Seven Seas		
1994	Green Legend Ran	Communicator	
1995	Fatal Fury: Legend of the Hungry Wolf	Ripper	
1995	Fatal Fury 2: The New Battle	Axel Hawk	
1995	The Hakkenden	Dosetsu Inuyama, Additional Voices	Director
1995	Ogre Slayer	Additional Voices	Director
1996–2001	Ranma ½	Gendo, Daihakuse, Various characters	Dialogue Director (Season 3)
1996	Please Save My Earth	Kazuto Tamura	
1996	The Humanoid	Alan	
1996	Ultimate Teacher	Principal Suzuki, Scientist	
1996	Maison Ikkoku	Kozue's Father	
1996–2000	Dragon Ball Z	Nappa, Nail, Supreme Kai, Various characters	Ocean dub
1997	Key the Metal Idol	Staff C	
1998	Night Warriors: Darkstalkers' Revenge	Hannya	
1998	Monkey Magic	Batty, Adm. Dopuck	
1999	Cybersix	Lucas Amato, Fixed Ideas	
1999	Monster Rancher	Roko	
2000	Mobile Suit Gundam Wing	Duke Dermail, Attah, Vice-Foreign Minister Darlian	
2000–01	The Vision of Escaflowne	Dryden Fassa, Additional Voices	Ocean/Bandai dub
2001	Gundam Wing: Endless Waltz	Dekim Barton, Attah	
2001	Zoids: New Century	Dr. Laon	
2001–02	Mobile Suit Gundam	General Revil	
2002	Z-Mind	Uncle	
2002	Earth Maiden Arjuna	Sakurai	
2002	Trouble Chocolate	Ganache, Ham-Ham	
2002–03	Hamtaro	Dylan	
2002–03	Transformers: Armada	Starscream	
2002–04	Project ARMS series	White Knight	
2003, 2005, 2010	Inuyasha	Jinenji, Hoshiyomi, Additional Voices	
2003–04	MegaMan NT Warrior	MagnetMan.EXE	Also Axess
2003	Master Keaton	Professor William Stephane	
2003	Zoids: Fuzors	Dan, Alpha Richter	
2003	Infinite Ryvius	Additional Voices	
2004–05	Transformers: Energon	Starscream, Signal Flare	
2004	Mobile Suit Gundam SEED	George Glenn, Captain Fredrik Ades	
2004	Galaxy Angel Z	Additional Voices	
2005	Star Ocean EX	Ururun	
2005	Human Crossing	Eiji Sasama	
2005	Tetsujin 28-go	Ryusaku Murasame	
2005	Starship Operators	Dure Elroy, Amateras Captain	
2005	Hikaru no Go	Mr. Shu	
2005–06	Transformers: Cybertron	Starscream, Brakedown, Colonel Franklin	
2006	Ōban Star-Racers	Rick Thunderbolt, Flint	
2006	Shakugan no Shana	Dantalion	Season 1
2007	The Story of Saiunkoku		Voice director (Episodes 20–23)
2007	Ayakashi: Samurai Horror Tales	Kuhei Yamazumi	
2007	Black Lagoon	Vice President, Spielberger	
2007	Ghost in the Shell: Stand Alone Complex	Takekawa, Somerset	OVAs
2007–08	Death Note	President David Hoope, Gelus, Armonia Justin Beyondormason, Jose	
2008	Powerpuff Girls Z	Mojo Jojo, Mackerel Monster/Daddy Mackerel	
2008	Ultraviolet: Code 044	Police Inspector Bark	
2008–09	Mobile Suit Gundam 00 series	Sergei Smirnov	
2009	Nana	Kudo	
2012–16	Cardfight!! Vanguard series	Misaki's Father (eps 24-25), Tetsu Shinjou	Credited as William Scott
2012	Kurozuka	Izana, Kentoku, Tonba	
2013	Inuyasha: The Final Act	Magatsuhi, Demon of the Shikon Jewel	
2014–15	Future Card Buddyfight series	Aooni, Blade Wing Phoenix, Card Rhino, Crossbow Dragon, Death Ruler Gallows, Dragon Knight, Vlad Dracula, Galvanic Feather Dragon, Genma Todoroki, Ice Blade Joker, Merlin, Phantom Ninja, Kashinkoji, Principal Nigirikobushi, Sueroku, Zanya's Father, 7th Omni Earth Lord, Count Dawn (19 episodes), Assault Leader (eps 10, 16), Shadow Hero Schwarz (eps 18, 23); Vert Deus Matrix, Guru Bunbuku, Charge Commander Delta	Credited as William Scott
2016	World Trigger	Narrator	
2017	Beyblade Burst	Kento Aoi	
2021	Future Boy Conan	Gucchi	

=== Films ===
List of voice and English dubbing performances in direct-to-video, television and feature films
Year	Title	Role	Notes
1994	Ranma ½: Big Trouble in Nekonron, China	Daihakusei	
1998	Snowden: Raggedy Ann and Andy's Adventure	Animal Walla	
2001	A Christmas Adventure... From a Book Called Wisely's Tales	Comet	
2002	Jin-Roh: The Wolf Brigade	Kazuki Fuse	
2002	Escaflowne	Dryden Fassa	
2002	Inspector Gadget's Last Case: Claw's Revenge	R2K	
2003	G.I. Joe: Spy Troops	Cobra Commander	
2003	Barbie of Swan Lake	Erasmus, Villager	
2003	Ben Hur	Joseph, Soldier #2	
2003	Bionicle: Mask of Light	Kopaka Nuva, Hewkii	
2004	G.I. Joe: Valor vs. Venom	Cobra Commander	
2004	Bionicle 2: Legends of Metru Nui	Lhikan, Krekka	
2005	Barbie: Fairytopia	Quill, Amethyst	
2005	Inuyasha the Movie: Swords of an Honorable Ruler	Saya	
2005	Dragons II: The Metal Ages	Kraugn	
2006	Tony Hawk in Boom Boom Sabotage	Larry Grimley, Homey Clown, Worker	
2007	The Condor	Nigel Harrington	
2007	Death Note 2: The Last Name	Rem	
2008	Barbie & the Diamond Castle	Edgar the Innkeeper	
2009	Barbie and the Three Musketeers	Bertram, Musketeer Guard	
2010	Barbie: A Fashion Fairytale	Zombie Peas	
2011	Barbie: A Fairy Secret	Wedding Officiant	
2011	Thor: Tales of Asgard	Geirmarr	
2012	Barbie: The Princess & the Popstar	Limburger, Palace Guard #2	
2012	Journey to GloE	Glowless	
2013	Escape from Planet Earth	Shanker's Father	
2014	Slugterra: Ghoul from Beyond	Milford	
2015	Mune: Guardian of the Moon	Leeyoon, Xolal, Cousin 1	
2015	Barbie in Rock'n Royals	Finn Oxford	
2016	My Little Pony: Equestria Girls – Legend of Everfree	Bulk Biceps	
2016	Sausage Party	Queso	
2017	Barbie Video Game Hero	Cutie, Video Game Narrator	
2017	My Little Pony: The Movie	Bulk Biceps	
2020	The Willoughbys	Taxi Driver, Various Guides, The Perfect Dad, Hippie Dad	
2024	Thomas & Friends: The Christmas Letter Express	Santa Claus	US version

=== Live-action ===
List of voice performances in live-action series
Year	Title	Role	Notes
1997–98	Ninja Turtles: The Next Mutation	Leonardo (voice)	
2019	Gabby Duran & the Unsittables	Timbuk (voice)	Episode" "The Party King and Timbuk, Too"

=== Video games ===
List of voice and English dubbing performances in video games
Year	Title	Role	Notes	Source
2000	Need for Speed: Porsche Unleashed	Narrator		
2000	Kessen	Ishida Mitsunari	English dub	
2003	Hulk	Leader / Samuel Sterns		
2003	Mobile Suit Gundam: Encounters in Space	Gadem	English dub	
2004	Warhammer 40,000: Dawn of War	Inquisitor Mordecai Toth, various others		
2004	Under the Skin	Additional Voices	English dub	
2005	Marvel Nemesis: Rise of the Imperfects	Johnny Ohm, Niles Van Roekel		
2005	Warhammer 40,000: Dawn of War – Winter Assault	Chaos Lord Crull, Techpriest Enginseers, Sanctioned Psykers		
2006	The Godfather	Sergeant Joe Galtosino, Rocco Lampone		
2007	Dynasty Warriors: Gundam	Johann Ibrahim Revil	English dub	
2008	Sins of a Solar Empire	Vocal Talent		
2010	DeathSpank	Deathspank		
2010	DeathSpank: Thongs of Virtue	Deathspank		
2011	The Baconing	Deathspank		
2011	Trinity: Souls of Zill O’ll	Dorado	English dub	
2011	Dynasty Warriors: Gundam 3	Henken Bekkener, Master Asia	English dub	
2011	Driver: San Francisco	Charles Jericho		
2012	Shank 2	General Magnus, Razor		
2012	Sins of a Solar Empire: Rebellion	Vocal Talent		
2015	Invisible, Inc.	Monst3r		

Preceded by Doug Parker	Voice of Starscream; 2001-2007	Succeeded by Charlie Adler
Preceded by Scott McNeil	Voice of Cobra Commander; 2003-2004	Succeeded by Marc Thompson
