= Killshot =

Killshot or Kill Shot may refer to:

== Film and television ==
- Killshot (film), a 2008 American thriller film
- "Killshot", a 1994 episode of High Tide
- "Killshot", a 1995 episode of Deadly Games
- "Killshot", a 1984 episode of Miami Vice
- "Killshot", a 2009 episode of NCIS: Los Angeles

== Literature ==
- Killshot (novel), a 1989 novel by Elmore Leonard
- Kill Shot, a 2012 novel by Vince Flynn

== Music ==
- "Killshot" (song), a 2018 song by Eminem
- "Killshot", a 2009 song by Ben Frost from By the Throat
- "Killshot", a 2020 song by Magdalena Bay from A Little Rhythm and a Wicked Feeling

== Other uses ==
- Killshot (wrestler) or Shane Strickland, American professional wrestler
- Kill Shot (video game), a 2014 mobile video game by Hothead Games

== See also ==
- Dead Shot (disambiguation)
