= On the Rain-Slick Precipice of Darkness: Episode One and Two =

Penny Arcade Adventures: On the Rain-Slick Precipice of Darkness
- Developer: Hothead Games
- Publisher: Hothead Games
- Designers: Jerry Holkins; Mike Krahulik
- Engine: Torque
- Platforms: Microsoft Windows, OS X, Xbox 360, PlayStation 3
- Release: Episode 1 May 21, 2008; Episode 2 October 29, 2008
- Genres: Adventure, role-playing
- Mode: Single-player

On the Rain-Slick Precipice of Darkness: Episode One and Episode Two (also called Penny Arcade Adventures: Episode One and Episode Two) are the first two episodes of an episodic action-adventure role-playing video game series based on the webcomic Penny Arcade. Episode 1 was released on May 21, 2008 on Linux, Mac OS X, Windows, and Xbox Live Arcade, and was later released on PlayStation Network on October 23, 2008. There is a demo available which can be upgraded to the full game. It was later released on Steam, with new Steamworks support. Episode 2 was released on Linux, Mac OS X, Windows, PlayStation Network, and Xbox Live Arcade on October 29, 2008.

The game was originally planned to be distributed episodically across four games. In March 2010, developer Hothead Games chose to devote its resources instead to DeathSpank, discontinuing its development of further episodes. Subsequently, prose chapters constituting the plot of Episode 3 were presented on Penny Arcade's website. In August 2011, Zeboyd Games announced that it would be developing Episode 3 albeit in a completely different graphical style. The third episode was released on June 25, 2012 and subsequently Zeboyd announced that they were working on Episode 4, which was released on June 6, 2013.

The games take place in a steampunk universe with Lovecraftian horror elements. They follow a player-customizable protagonist who is accompanied by versions of the comic's main characters, Gabe and Tycho, following a parodic story in which they must stop Great Old One-like entities.

== Gameplay ==
Penny Arcade Adventures' battle screen, with Gabe and the Player executing a simultaneous attack for extra damage

Penny Arcade Adventures is a role-playing adventure game which mixes 3D gameplay with 2D interstitials and cinematics. The gameplay consists mostly of seek-and-find puzzles, reminiscent of adventure games, where the player must collect items and return them to a character to advance the plot. They can also collect spare robot parts to upgrade their weapons. Battles consist of a real time combat system similar to the ATB (Active Time Battle) system of Final Fantasy Games, with context sensitive button presses reducing damage or being used to carry out special attacks.

== Plot ==
=== Episode One ===
The game begins with the narrator reading the first verse of a poem, later called The Quartet for the Dusk of Man. The player then designs a character of their choosing; with an introduction in the 1920s suburban neighborhood of the Player. A mysterious voice instructs the Player, whose home is quickly destroyed by a giant robot (a steampunk version of Fruit Fucker Prime), while smaller steampunk Fruit Fuckers attack. After a brief tutorial, the player teams up with Tycho Brahe, a scholar of Apocalyptic Studies turned detective, and his exceedingly violent partner who fought with the devil, Johnathan Gabriel, in search of information on Fruit Fucker Prime.

The three meet with Tycho's mechanically gifted niece, Anne-Claire, who suggests they search New Arcadia for evidence of Fruit Fucker Prime and parts of it. Tycho, Gabe, and the player begin collecting evidence of the giant robot, while also searching for a new home for the player and running afoul of a cult of mimes. They discover the smaller Fruit Fuckers are built in a factory underneath the Shithole, an apartment building the player briefly considers renting from, and that the mimes are devotees of Yog Sethis, also known as the "Silent One". The Necrowombicon, an ancient book that has no text but can be interpreted by a mime, describes the Silent One as "a horrible deity of unending quiet", a giant mime with Cthulhu's head.

Tycho is horrified that he allowed himself to miss the signs of an ancient God's return previously, and despairs that all hope is lost. He then tells the others it's impossible to kill a god, but they can stop it from entering their world. The Silent One is transferring its energy into their world and putting it into a body. If they can destroy its body before the process is complete, the Silent One will go back to the other side. The player asks Anne-Claire for her input, upon which she theories that there might be special items that can endow Tycho, Gabe, and the player's weapons with metaphysical properties capable of harming the Silent One's physical form. They gather the required items (a vacuum tube, scorched hobo urine, and the soul of the mime cult's leader), transform their weapons, and defeat the Silent One.

After the final battle, Tycho, Gabe, and the player watch the Silent One's form explode. Fruit Fucker Prime watches them from the beach, and walks into the ocean after Yog Sethis is destroyed. The second verse of the opening poem is then read aloud by the narrator.

=== Episode Two ===
Several months after Episode One ended, the Player has rebuilt his/her house (a tent), and Tycho and Gabe have set out to destroy Fruit Fuckers and try to find a lead on Fruit Fucker Prime. While escaping from a swarm of them, they crash a truck into the Player's (partially rebuilt) house, and recruit him/her to help them track down their lead. A trip to Anne-Claire's reveals that they have found the original designer of the Fruit Fuckers: Dr. Jonathan Crazoir, presently incarcerated in the same sanatorium as Tycho's father and grandfather when they succumbed to the insanity inherent to dealing with otherworldly affairs. She also demands they collect various pieces of equipment for one of her experiments: Five bolts of silk thread, preferably spider silk, a golden bolt, a truck or tractor engine, and a molecule of Energite, a highly unstable element. They enter the sanitarium to find Crazoir, who promises to give Tycho, Gabe, and the Player everything related to his research, as well as a "robot monkey card", if they can free him from the madhouse. After wooing the receptionist, they encounter huntsman/sanatorium owner Dr. Wolfington, who has used the millions made from the Brahe family's inevitable descent into madness to hunt down and kill every rare animal in the world. He declares the Player, Tycho, and Gabe all unfit for society after a rigged inkblot test, and has them injected with various chemicals to induce insanity.

The Player fights off the drugs with the help of Twisp and Catsby, and rescues Tycho and Gabe. A guard catches them, and locks down the facility. This seals off Dr. Wolfington's doors with Strengthium, an unbreakable compound. Anne-Claire donates spare parts to fix the doors, but the power difference between her experimental fuse and the security system unseals all doors in the facility, releasing several giant spiders. The trio harvests them for their silk, as per Anne-Claire's request, collects the engine from the truck that Tycho crashed into the Player's house at the beginning of the game, and return to confront Wolfington. After the fight, they forge release papers for Crazoir and read Wolfington's journal. Crazoir is revealed to have been committed as a favor to the mysterious "M", whose address is written down. The now-free Dr. Crazoir gives over his research, which suggests the Fruit Fucker to originally have been a farming tool called "Harvest Buddy", before the designs were stolen by someone as he was abducted by Dr. Wolfington.

The Player, Tycho, and Gabe travel to the apartment formerly owned by "M", in hopes of renting it. There, they confront Charles DuBois, an old enemy of Tycho and Gabe's and a ruthless treasure hunter. He plans to outright purchase the apartment out as his "Mid-late-Fall home" (or "early Spring home"; he hadn't decided), and Tycho insists that the Player must thwart him. A chase to the apartment ends in the landlord deciding he will give the apartment to whoever wins in a one-on-one fight to the death. Gabe goes to the kitchen to make a pie, and Tycho ransacks "M"'s apartment, finding various demonic items, including the Black Ledger, a tome that catalogs every deal made between demons and mortals. He pockets the Ledger, and returns to the Player, who has easily won the "sissy boss fight". Gabe finishes his pie, and accidentally sets the building on fire; leaving the player homeless yet again.

Anne-Claire directs the trio next to the "Symposium on the Future of Man" to find more information on Fruit Fucker Prime (as well as the autograph of her idol, Dr. Lars Krangle). They gain credentials with the other scientists by winning a robot monkey fighting tournament, the first-place trophy of which happens to be a molecule of Energite. Unfortunately, at the end of Dr. Krangle's keynote speech, Fruit Fucker Prime attacks, killing everyone in attendance, save Tycho, Gabe, the Player, and the enigmatic Dr. Blood, distinguished by his "timely appearance in the narrative". The robot is revealed to be piloted by Dr. Mordo von Mundo, also known as "M". Dr. Blood hastily explains that the Fruit Fuckers run on Darksteam, a steam mechanism that is infused with pure evil. Mundo then admits creations are stolen designs, and he himself is ostracized from the scientific community because of his radical theories on combining science and arcane magic. He intends to prove his abilities through manipulation of Fruit Fucker Prime, which is powered by the Necrowombicon itself, while the smaller units are powered by inscriptions from the book. After Mordo leaves to enact his scheme, Dr. Blood reveals to the Player and Gabe that Fruit Fucker Prime is the avatar of yet another god: Yog Kathak, the God of Gears, which Tycho was aware of, but hid from the other two. The four unite regardless, and leave for the 1922 World's Fair to stop Mordo von Mundo once and for all.

Anne-Claire is mysteriously no longer in her room, and at the fair, Fruit Fucker Prime is occupied, violating a building-sized orange against Mundo's will. After fighting through demon-possessed fairgoers, the team reaches the orange, where they do battle with Fruit Fucker Prime. They succeed in destroying its "chute", but the god's essence within heals all damage rendered to its main components. As the four prepare for their deaths, Anne-Claire arrives piloting a giant robot of her own; a massive doll powered by a truck engine and Energite, wearing a Spider-Silk dress. Anne-Claire destroys Prime, Tycho and Gabe kill Mundo, and the Player retrieves the Necrowombicon. The narrator reads the third verse of the Quartet for the Dusk of Man.

After the credits, it is revealed that Dr. Blood is in fact, Dr. Raven Darktalon Blood, who took mortal form to seek out and destroy the Necrowombicon.

== Development ==
Penny Arcade Adventures was officially announced on August 25, 2006. Robert Khoo, director of business relations at Penny Arcade, stated that the Penny Arcade team decided to partner with Hothead Games because they felt the developer would produce content that would remain faithful to the feel of Penny Arcade. Khoo also stressed that Penny Arcade's creators would be involved in the development, from providing art to writing the story. The in-game music was composed by Jeff Tymoschuk, with the song "Final Boss" by MC Frontalot playing over the closing credits of Episode One. Episode Two's ending song is "Some Things Man Was Not Meant to Know", by The Darkest of the Hillside Thickets. Charles's indecision regarding when he would live in his apartment refers to similar indecision on Holkins's part about whether to introduce Charles in Episode Two (released mid-late Fall 2008) or Episode Three, which was expected to release in early spring 2009 at the time.

During a Q&A session at PAX East 2010 on March 26, Holkins and Krahulik admitted that plans for production of Episode Three had been canceled, and that the ending of the story might be released in written form instead. On December 21, 2009 Wired.com named Episode 3 number seven in their list of top ten Vaporware 2009. In August 2011, Zeboyd Games announced that it would be developing Episode 3 albeit in a 16-bit graphical style. At PAX East 2012, the developers from Zeboyd Games confirmed the Player wouldn't be appearing in Episode 3. The third episode was released on June 25, 2012 and Episode 4 was officially revealed on January 24, 2013, with it being released on June 7, 2013.

== Reception ==
=== Episode 1 ===
Penny Arcade Adventures Episode 1

Aggregate scores
Aggregator	Score
GameRankings	79/100; 77/100
Metacritic	77/100; 76/100

Review scores
Publication	Score
1Up.com	B
Computer and Video Games	7.8/10
GameSpot	7.5/10
GameSpy	4/5
IGN	7.8/10

Episode 1 has been modestly praised by reviewers. On the aggregate review sites GameRankings and Metacritic, Penny Arcade Adventures garnered critic averages from 76 to 79%. Penny Arcade released statistics showing that their game ranked third best in launch sales on Xbox Live Marketplace, coming after Rez HD and Ikaruga.

While the game's artistic style and humor have drawn approval (with Edge noting that the latter can be an acquired taste), critics have questioned whether the gameplay will be strong enough to drive a whole series of titles.

=== Episode 2 ===
Penny Arcade Adventures Episode 2

Aggregate scores
Aggregator	Score
GameRankings	79/100; 78/100
Metacritic	80/100; 77/100

Review score
Publication	Score
1Up.com	B+

Episode 2 received similar reviews to the reviews of Episode 1, yet generated only one third of its sales.
