= Ninja Turtles: The Next Mutation =

American superhero television series

- Genre: Science fiction comedy; Superhero
- Based on: Characters created by Kevin Eastman and Peter Laird
- Developed by: Dan Clark
- Voices of: Michael Dobson; Kirby Morrow; Jason Gray-Stanford; Matt Hill; Stephen Mendel; Lalainia Lindbjerg; Christopher Gaze; Lee Tockar
- Theme music composer: Jeremy Sweet
- Composers: Larry Seymour; Jeremy Sweet; Shuki Levy; Kussa Mahchi
- Countries of origin: United States; Canada
- No. of seasons: 1
- No. of episodes: 26

Production
- Executive producers: Haim Saban; Lance H. Robbins
- Production locations: Vancouver, British Columbia, Canada
- Running time: 25 minutes
- Production company: Saban Entertainment

Original release
- Network: Fox Kids
- Release: September 12, 1997 – May 15, 1998

Ninja Turtles: The Next Mutation is an American television series produced by Saban Entertainment. It is the only live-action television series in the Teenage Mutant Ninja Turtles franchise. It ran on the Fox Kids network from 1997 to 1998. The series revolves around older Turtles and a fifth turtle, Venus De Milo, who helps them defeat Shredder. Afterwards, the Ninja Turtles battle new enemies such as Dragon Lord.

== Plot ==
Set several years after the events of Teenage Mutant Ninja Turtles III, the Turtles are now 18 and are in their battle against the Foot Clan, they meet an ally, Venus de Milo. With her unique skills and tactical abilities, she helps the Turtles defeat Shredder and disband the Foot Clan. Later on, when the Rank led by Dragon Lord escapes from their enchanted mirror with a plan to take over the Earth, Venus stands by the Turtles, aiding them with her expertise to stop the Rank's malevolent plot and preserve the balance of their world. Through their journey together, Venus becomes an integral part of the Turtles' family, embodying the heroic spirit of unity and determination.

== Cast and characters ==
=== Turtles ===
- Leonardo (portrayed by Gabe Khouth and Shishir Inocalla, voiced by Michael Dobson) – The blue-masked turtle who wields a ninjatō and is the leader of the Ninja Turtles. In this show, Leo's mask covers much of the top of his head. During the course of the series, Leo has sought new ways to learn how to combat enemies such as the Rank and Simon Bonesteel.
- Raphael (portrayed by Mitchell A. Lee Yuen and Dean Choe, voiced by Matt Hill) – The red-masked turtle who wields two sai. Impulsive, Raph appears to see Bonesteel as his personal enemy, having an entire episode with him.
- Michaelangelo (portrayed by Jarred Blancard and Larry Lam, voiced by Kirby Morrow) – The orange-masked turtle who wields two tonfas and is self-proclaimed "Prince of All Media" who runs a pirate radio show from the Turtles' jeep.
- Donatello (portrayed by Richard Yee and David Soo, voiced by Jason Gray-Stanford) – The purple-masked turtle who wields a bō staff and is the genius of the group. A fan of the somewhat insane Dr. Quease, Donnie has tried working with him on a way to send the enemies from the Rank back into the Enchanted Mirror.
- Venus de Milo (portrayed by Nicole Parker and Leslie Sponberg, voiced by Lalainia Lindbjerg) – A fifth Turtle that wears a light blue mask. Venus was mutated at the same time as the other turtles, but ended up in Chinatown, where Chung found her. She was raised as a shinobi, a mystical version of a ninja.

=== Allies ===
- Master Splinter (portrayed by Fiona Scott, voiced by Stephen Mendel) – A mutant rat and the adoptive father of the Turtles who trained them in ninjitsu. Splinter is usually not involved with the Turtles' antics, often imparting advice or yelling at them about the noise of their vehicles. He will often play chess at night with his blind human friend Andre.
- Chung (portrayed by Tseng Chang, voiced by Dale Wilson) – An old friend of Splinter and Venus' adopted father. He trained Venus as a shinobi, but was killed by the Dragon Lord after the latter used Chung as a conduit to allow his forces to escape their prison dimension and reach the Realm of Dreams. He was also a foe of the vampire Vam Mi, having stolen her heart after defeating her. This later led her to seek revenge on Venus.
- Andre (portrayed by Len Gibson) – A blind man whom Splinter often plays chess with in the park.

=== Enemies ===
- Foot Clan – The Foot of this series appear a lot more clumsy and less intelligent (due to comic relief values), much to Shredder's irritation. The Foot Clan is implied to have battled the Turtles constantly for many years, as the Turtles are now 18 years old. When Splinter falls ill, the full fury of the Foot Clan is unleashed upon the Turtles' lair, which has recently been discovered by them. The sheer numbers of the expanding Foot Clan easily overwhelm the Turtles in combat and Shredder then prepares to finish them off, vowing to destroy their leader as well. However, Venus de Milo uses her Shinobi magic, drives Shredder insane by calling the true Oroku Saki to the surface to take control, thereby destroying Shredder. Following Shredder's death, the Foot Clan disbands.
  - Shredder (portrayed by Patrick Pon, voiced by Doug Parker) – The Shredder appears in the five-part pilot episode "East Meets West", where he is apparently killed. In the episode "Enemy Of My Enemy", Shredder appears in his civilian guise of Oroku Saki and is targeted by Dragon Lord's soldiers, who seek a ninja amulet called the Golden Shuriken.
- Rank – The Rank is a group of evil dragons who were previously trapped in an enchanted glass.
  - Dragon Lord (portrayed by Gerald Wong, voiced by Christopher Gaze) – The leader of the Rank and the king of the dragons. Dragon Lord was the first evil dragon and his charisma lead to other dragons joining him, and thus the banishing of his entire race.
  - Wick (portrayed by Adam Behr and Bill Terezakis, voiced by Lee Tockar) – A small dragon who is Dragon Lord's sidekick.
  - Rank Lieutenant (portrayed by Andrew Kavadas) – The head of Dragon Lord's army. He is distinguished from the other by his violet hood.
- Dr. Cornelius Quease (portrayed by Simon Webb) – A renowned scientist with discolored skin and expert on mutation and other fields. He attempts to create various weapons to defeat the turtles. After joining forces with the Dragon Lord, Quease adds a yellow labcoat to his outfit along with his red gloves and blue work outfit.
- Silver (portrayed by Garry Chalk) – The last of the Yetis. Instead of living on top of the mountain, he makes his life by going into the crime business and starting a gang of humans who think of him as the smartest boss around. He can't spell, but is otherwise more sophisticated than his moronic henchmen. For some reason, he was able to find out an old man would win the lottery and broke into his home before he found out himself.
- Simon Bonesteel (portrayed by Scott McNeil) – A deranged big-game hunter who specializes in hunting endangered animals. Bonesteel possesses a paranoid, anti–social personality and is known to give his weapons female names; he even talks to his weapons, and can be tricked with enough word play. Bonesteel is revealed to have made his home on the roof of an abandoned building.
- Heavy Duke (portrayed by Travis MacDonald) – Leader of the Unknowables Street Gang, who ruled the 8th Street neighborhood.
- Vam-Mi (portrayed by Kira Clavell, voiced by Saffron Henderson) – A 10,000-year-old vampire from China. She was previously defeated by Chung, who tore out her heart, placing her into a long sleep. Van-Mi's henchmen Bing and Chi Chu use a magic potion to awaken her. However, unless Vam-Mi's heart was returned within 96 hours, she would turn into sludge and die. The Turtles use Vam-Mi's link to her heart to lure her into a trap, reducing her to dust.

== Episodes ==
No.	Title	Directed by	Written by	Original release date
1	"East Meets West"	Richard Martin (Parts 1–2); Clay Boris (Part 3); Michael Mazo (Parts 4–5)	Dan Clark (Parts 1–4); Michael Mayhew (Parts 4–5)	September 12, 1997 (Part 1)
2	"East Meets West"	Richard Martin (Parts 1–2); Clay Boris (Part 3); Michael Mazo (Parts 4–5)	Dan Clark (Parts 1–4); Michael Mayhew (Parts 4–5)	September 19, 1997 (Part 2)
3	"East Meets West"	Richard Martin (Parts 1–2); Clay Boris (Part 3); Michael Mazo (Parts 4–5)	Dan Clark (Parts 1–4); Michael Mayhew (Parts 4–5)	September 26, 1997 (Part 3)
4	"East Meets West"	Richard Martin (Parts 1–2); Clay Boris (Part 3); Michael Mazo (Parts 4–5)	Dan Clark (Parts 1–4); Michael Mayhew (Parts 4–5)	October 3, 1997 (Part 4)
5	"East Meets West"	Richard Martin (Parts 1–2); Clay Boris (Part 3); Michael Mazo (Parts 4–5)	Dan Clark (Parts 1–4); Michael Mayhew (Parts 4–5)	October 10, 1997 (Part 5)
Part 1: While the Shredder and his Foot Clan continue to hunt the Turtles unsuccessfully, Splinter gets trapped in the Dream Realm while meditating. The Chinese Shinobi master Chung I warns him that the Dragon Lord has caused the Dream Realm to become unstable and is trying to use this disruption as a way to enter the real world. Chung I sends his hooded prized pupil, Mai Pai Chi, from China to New York City to help the now-trapped Splinter. When removing her hood, it is revealed that she is also a mutant turtle. Part 2: Once meeting up with the Turtles in their lair in New York, Chung I's student explains that she too was mutated along with the Turtles in the sewers of New York City, and that she was washed downstream by herself and was found by Chung I in Chinatown. After being attacked by the Foot Clan, Michaelangelo names her "Venus de Milo", in reference to a statue's head she was carrying after the attack. As a group, they infiltrate the Foot Clan's headquarters and Venus uses her Shinobi magic to destroy Shredder's evil personality and end the Foot Clan. Part 3: Venus successfully teaches the Turtles how to enter the Dream Realm and they are able to free Splinter, after which he awakens from his meditative state. Unfortunately, the Dragon Lord and his minions (called "The Rank") follow through the portal into the real world as well, and the Dragon Lord vows to kill and eat the Turtles to absorb their mutant powers for himself. Part 4 The Dragon Lord sets his minion, Wick, and several Rank Dragons out into the world to gather ingredients for an invincibility serum. They are unable to find enough ingredients for more than a few doses, so they attempt to gather the exotic bones they require from the Bronx Zoo. The Turtles intercept them and work together to foil their plan. Part 5: The Dragon Lord sends more Rank Dragons to the Zoo to finish off the Turtles, equipped with additional doses of their invincibility serum. Donatello has discovered that the serum is actually just a placebo, which causes the Rank to retreat from the fight. While the Dragon Lord vows revenge, the Turtles realize that the differences in how they each handle situations is what contributes to making them a great team when working together.
6	"The Staff of Bu-Ki"	Michael Mazo	Ramon Pirouzian	October 17, 1997
The Dragon Lord utilizes a time warp to steal the Staff of Bu-Ki, an ancient relic that renders Shinobi magic useless. He successfully lures Venus away from the Turtles in an attempt to neutralize her abilities and defeat her, but the Turtles show up in time to save her, thwarting the Dragon Lord once again.
7	"All in the Family"	James Taylor	Eric Weinthal	October 24, 1997
The Turtles encounter a poacher in the sewer: Simon Bonesteel. When they find out that he's trying to sell a baby sea turtle on the black market, they realize their innate connection to other turtles and devise a plan to save the baby turtle. Bonesteel is thwarted, but he escapes and vows to catch the Turtles.
8	"Silver and Gold"	Don McCutcheon	Todd Swift	October 31, 1997
The Turtles think Michaelangelo is crazy when he runs into a giant talking gorilla gangster named Silver. When they discover that he's real and attempt to stop him from robbing a vault, Silver locks Venus in the vault with a timed bomb. Donatello hacks the vault's combination in the nick of time, saving Venus from certain doom while Silver escapes into the night. In this episode, Leonardo mentions the Power Rangers, teasing their apparition in Power Rangers In Space.
9	"Turtles' Night Out"	James Taylor	Alan Swayze	November 7, 1997
Michaelangelo's pirate radio show, The Sewer Hour, holds a costumed rave at 8th Street district to raise money for endangered animals, which gives the Turtles a front for dancing the night away with fellow humans who believe that their appearance as turtles is merely a costume. Unfortunately, Bonesteel shows up, attempts to ruin the party and capture the turtles, as well as an arrogant street gang called "The Unknowables" who claims the district is their turf, also attempts to crash the rave so they can steal the donation money for themselves. Bonesteel and The Unknowables' leader "Heavy Duke", ends up being the butt of the joke, and the party raises $1,200 for an endangered animal charity.
10	"Meet Dr. Quease"	Rob Stewart	Michael Mayhew	November 14, 1997
Donatello sneaks out to watch a lecture by his favorite eccentric biologist, Dr. Cornelius Quease. The Rank captures the doctor for his knowledge regarding the science of mutation, and Donatello tries to convince the Turtles to rescue the doctor. When Donatello decides to go it alone, he finds that Dr. Quease has been swayed by the gift of a state-of-the-art laboratory provided by the Dragon Lord, and the Turtles initiate a rescue mission to save Donatello. They save their brother, but Quease remains under the employ of the Dragon Lord.
11	"Windfall"	Don McCutcheon	Barry Julien	November 21, 1997
Silver attempts to steal a winning lottery ticket from an elderly man, but it ends up in Michaelangelo's hands instead. As Michaelangelo thinks of all the different ways he could spend his winnings, Silver makes every attempt to regain possession of the winning ticket. He is ultimately thwarted by the Turtles, and neither Silver nor the Turtles end up with the winning ticket.
12	"Truce or Consequences"	Iain Patterson	Ken Hotz and Spencer Rice	November 22, 1997
Wick becomes a fan of The Sewer Hour, Michaelangelo's pirate radio show. After hearing a broadcast about rebelling against oppressive authority, the Dragon Lord enacts a plan to lure Michaelangelo by pretending to be fans. The Rank captures Michaelangelo, but the remaining Turtles concoct a plan to save Michaelangelo in which they pretend to surrender to the Dragon Lord.
13	"Unchain My Heart"	Rob Stewart (Part 1), Otta Hanus (Part 2); Scott Ateah (Parts 3–4)	Rhonda Smiley (Part 1 & 3), Barry Julien (Part 2), Dan Clark (Part 4)	February 6, 1998 (Part 1)
14	"Unchain My Heart"	Rob Stewart (Part 1), Otta Hanus (Part 2); Scott Ateah (Parts 3–4)	Rhonda Smiley (Part 1 & 3), Barry Julien (Part 2), Dan Clark (Part 4)	February 13, 1998 (Part 2)
15	"Unchain My Heart"	Rob Stewart (Part 1), Otta Hanus (Part 2); Scott Ateah (Parts 3–4)	Rhonda Smiley (Part 1 & 3), Barry Julien (Part 2), Dan Clark (Part 4)	February 20, 1998 (Part 3)
16	"Unchain My Heart"	Rob Stewart (Part 1), Otta Hanus (Part 2); Scott Ateah (Parts 3–4)	Rhonda Smiley (Part 1 & 3), Barry Julien (Part 2), Dan Clark (Part 4)	February 27, 1998 (Part 4)
Part 1: Two children in China named Chi Chu and Bing are shown opening a mysterious coffin. An anthropomorphic skeleton rises from the coffin, at which time Chi Chu pours a magical elixir onto the skeleton to give it the form of a human woman. It is revealed that the children are her associates (and are actually 1,200 years old), and that she is a 2,000 year old vampire named "Vam-Mi". She was defeated 17 years ago by Venus's former master Chung I, at which time he removed her heart and stored it in a wooden box while she was locked away in a coffin. She reveals that she needs to find her heart and put it back in place within four days, otherwise she will lose her human illusion will die once and for all. When Bing informs her that Venus (along with the ancient box containing her heart) is now in America, they travel to New York City on a mission to recover her missing heart from Venus. While Bonesteel is trying to ambush the Turtles, Vam-Mi & Co. appear and attack Venus. The Turtles escape, and Venus discovers that the mysterious dried herb in her antique wooden box has now turned into a beating heart. Part 2: With Bonesteel still unsuccessfully hunting the Turtles, Vam-Mi continues to try to find her heart. Due to her close proximity, the heart begins moving on its own in an attempt to make its way back to her. Venus insists that they need keep it away from her, however the other Turtles are under the impression that they would be better off giving the heart back to Vam-Mi in exchange for her leaving the Turtles alone. While Venus is asleep, Raphael secretly lets the heart out onto the streets by itself in the middle of the night. However, after running into Vam-Mi and hearing her admit that they want to kill Venus, the Turtles change their mind and battle Vam-Mi instead. The vampires are forced to flee when the sun rises, and Raphael secretly returns the heart to Venus while she is still asleep so she wouldn't know that they took the heart and almost gave it back to Vam-Mi. Part 3: After an argument about whose problem Vam-Mi is, Venus leaves the Turtles to study a pile of ancient Shinobi scrolls by herself, in an attempt to learn a Shinobi magic spell to destroy vampires. Vam-Mi tracks her down and attacks her, however Leonardo appears and saves the day. Bonesteel, who is also currently chasing Venus, obtains Vam-Mi's heart during her confrontation with Vam-Mi. After returning to the Turtles' lair and admitting that she had lost the heart during the fray, Leonardo convinces the Turtles that if they find Bonesteel, they'll find the heart. Both the Turtles and Vam-Mi end up tracking down Bonesteel at the same time, and after a fight between the three parties, Bonesteel captures Vam-Mi & Co. in a cage, while the Turtles end up with the heart back in their possession. They lock the heart in a safe, unsure about what to do with it now that they have it back. Part 4: Bonesteel negotiates a deal with Vam-Mi & Co. to work together to defeat the Turtles. While the Turtles work on various gadgets with which to locate and fight Vam-Mi, Venus continues to practice Shinobi magic spells to defeat Vam-Mi. She is unsuccessful at first, but is able to finally master the Shinobi spell from her ancient scrolls. The Turtles track down Vam-Mi who proves to be more powerful than they had imagined. Bonesteel takes advantage of the fight and ends up capturing Leonardo, Michaelangelo, Donatello, and Raphael, while Splinter and Venus flee. The Turtles trick Bonesteel and escape back to the lair, where Venus uses her telepathy to commune with the heart. Vam-Mi uses magic to teleport to her heart, and the Turtles ambush her with sunlight. Vam-Mi dissolves into ash and she is finally defeated. Venus reflects on her experiences and realizes that she is now part of the Turtles' family and is a true Shinobi warrior.
17	"Mutant Reflections"	David Straiton	Michael Mayhew	April 6, 1998
Dr. Quease develops several robotic Turtles at the request of the Dragon Lord, and sends them to attack the real Turtles. When Donatello discovers the plot, he infiltrates Dr. Quease's lab and executes a successful plan with the real Turtles to destroy the robots for good.
18	"King Wick"	David Straiton	Alan Swayze	April 23, 1998
Wick is exposed to an experimental magic potion that he was brewing to treat the Dragon Lord's headache and suddenly becomes powerful and arrogant. He disables the Dragon Lord with magic and declares himself as "King Wick", with the former Dragon Lord being relegated to his personal companion (now referred to as "Weenie"). After leading an unsuccessful attack on the Turtles, Wick's own magic reverts him back to his former self, forcing him to resume his duties as the Dragon Lord's companion.
19	"Like Brothers"	Iain Patterson	Rhonda Smiley	April 24, 1998
After an intense sparring session, Leonardo and Raphael argue while recalling the events of several previous episodes in this clip-based recap episode. In the context of a back and forth argument, the events of the "East Meets West" story arc are summarized. Clips from several additional episodes are used to demonstrate each Turtles' thoughts on their interpersonal relationships (including the episode the Guest which was aired after this). Venus reminds the Turtles how they're like brothers and eventually convinces them to make up.
20	"Going Ape"	Otta Hanus	Todd Swift	April 27, 1998
Raphael runs into Bonesteel as he is out for a motorcycle ride and is chased into an abandoned house. The Rank track Raphael to the house as well. All three parties soon discover that a giant gorilla named Bongo (who escaped from the Bronx Zoo) is hiding in the same house. Raphael and Bonesteel are forced to temporarily work together to escape the predicament in one piece, after which Raphael befriends the escaped gorilla.
21	"The Guest"	Richard Flower	Rhonda Smiley	May 4, 1998
Splinter's blind human friend Andre was evicted from his apartment, and Splinter insists that he stays with him in the Turtle lair until he finds a new place to live. On their way to the lair, they bump into Dr. Quease and accidentally swap Andre's walking stick for Quease's experimental "bio-disrupter rod", a new weapon that he is testing for the Dragon Lord which causes biological matter to combust. Although initially resistant, the Turtles quickly befriend Andre due to his kind nature. After Andre leaves, Raphael discovers that Quease is trying to track down Andre to retrieve the bio-disrupter, resulting in Splinter leading an attack on Dr. Quease and The Rank. Venus breaks the bio-disrupter rod causing Quease to flee, while Andre finally moves into a new apartment with the help of Splinter and the Turtles.
22	"Trusting Dr. Quease"	Robert Lee	Dan Clark, Michael Mayhew	May 11, 1998
After having a disagreement with the Dragon Lord regarding Dr. Quease's desire to run tests on the Turtles instead of killing them, Dr. Quease reaches out to Donatello to help him further his research on mutation. Donatello agrees despite his fellow Turtles' distrust of Quease, and he soon finds out that Quease is still evil after the Turtles embark on a mission to save Donatello.
23	"The Good Dragon"	Robert Lee	Dan Clark, Michael Mayhew	May 12, 1998
The Rank interrupts a game of laser tag between Venus and Raphael, during which Venus discovers a morally conscious "Good Dragon" who saves her during the ambush. He reveals that all dragons were good until the Dragon Lord corrupted them using trickery in the Dream Realm. After a battle between The Rank and the Turtles, the "Good Dragon" confronts the Dragon Lord and voluntarily returns to the Dream Realm via the Glass Prison, vowing to one day come back to the human world to slay the Dragon Lord.
24	"Sewer Crash"	Robert Lee	Dan Clark, Michael Mayhew	May 13, 1998
While chatting in an online chat room, Donatello is brainwashed by Silver via a computer virus that exposes him to hypnotic suggestions. Under this hypnosis, Donatello begins committing high-tech jewelry robberies for Silver until Raphael discovers what's going on and helps Donatello escape from Silver's grasp by snapping him out of his hypnotic state by using the trigger word "banana".
25	"Enemy of My Enemy"	Robert Lee	Dan Clark, Michael Mayhew	May 14, 1998
Splinter finds Oroku Saki (formerly Shredder), now a beggar, being assaulted by teens. He saves Oroku and brings him back to the Turtles' lair. The Dragon Lord discovers that Oroku possess an ancient battle relic that can increase his power which Oroku stole from Splinter's former master, called the "Golden Shuriken". After Oroku has a disagreement with Splinter and leaves the Turtles' lair, The Rank tracks down Oroku, who ends up escaping with the Golden Shuriken in hand and vows to soon return to his former evil glory.
26	"Who Needs Her"	Richard Flower	Rhonda Smiley	May 15, 1998
After making fun of Venus's failure to learn a Shinobi togetherness spell properly, Venus storms out of the lair, leaving the other Turtles magically affixed to each other with Shinobi magic. This is a clip-based recap episode focused around the Turtles' memories of Venus. While stuck together, the "Unchain My Heart" story arc is summarized using clips as the Turtles reminisce, in addition to remembering the events of several other episodes. Splinter is able to undo the spell and the Turtles realize that Venus is indeed a valued member of their family, so they track her down only to find that she had already freed herself from The Rank's grasp. Venus explains why all five Turtles work so well together and, excited and united, they run off to their next adventure.

== Production ==
The Next Mutation was first announced in late 1996 through ninjaturtles.com. The series introduced many new elements to the Teenage Mutant Ninja Turtles, including a female mutant turtle called Venus (named after the famous statue) and new central antagonists, an army of humanoid dragons known as "The Rank" led by the vicious Dragonlord.

The series was touted in some of the promotional material as a continuation of the 1987 TV series, although it reuses set designs and story elements from the live action film trilogy. Notably, April O'Neil and Casey Jones are absent, and in a departure from other TMNT continuities, Leonardo states in the second episode that the Turtles are not blood-related, while other media explicitly present the Turtles as biological siblings.

Other notable differences were found in the Turtles' weapons; Leonardo carries one double-bladed ninjatō instead of two katana (though he was shown to own two in a few episodes), Donatello has a metal Bō staff instead of a wooden one, Raphael's twin sai could combine to make a staff; and Michaelangelo's signature weapon was a pair of tonfa (his weapon of choice in other media, nunchucks, are outlawed in several places). Further, the name of the series was amended in several European countries to Hero Turtles: The Next Mutation under various censorship rulings, as with most output of the franchise at the time.

The series was shot in Vancouver in British Columbia, Canada.

=== Power Rangers crossover ===
Outside of The Next Mutation, the Turtles also guest-starred alongside the Power Rangers in Power Rangers in Space. The end of the episode "Save Our Ship" leads directly into "Shell Shocked", where the Turtles are summoned and brainwashed by Astronema to fight the Rangers. Her control over them is later broken, and they team up with the Space Rangers to battle Astronema's forces. Before returning to New York, the Turtles have one request from the Rangers: space surfing on the Galaxy Gliders. Because the show is filmed in Vancouver, they could not use the usual voice actors for the Turtles and they were all voiced by Los Angeles voice actors who matched their voices. Leonardo was voiced by Michael Reisz, Raphael was voiced by Kim Strauss, Donatello was voiced by Ezra Weisz, Michaelangelo was voiced by Tony Oliver, and Venus de Milo was voiced by Tifanie Christun.

=== Venus de Milo ===
The show's most notable contribution to the Turtles mythos was a fifth mutant turtle, a female named Venus de Milo (initially named Mei Pieh Chi), who was skilled in the mystical arts of the shinobi and wears a light blue mask that was braided in the back, giving the appearance of a ponytail. She was also shown to have a lack of knowledge of U.S culture and sayings. Venus was portrayed by Nicole Parker and voiced by Lalainia Lindbjerg.

In a 2007 interview, director Kevin Munroe elaborated on the instructions Peter Laird gave to him for TMNT, saying that among those rules was "absolutely no mention of Venus de Milo, the female Turtle. You can't even joke about that with Peter. It's just one of those things that he hates with a passion". Kevin Eastman said he liked the character and that it would be fun for her to appear in the comics, and in 2022, Venus returned to the franchise in the IDW comics with a new origin and design.

== Home video ==
=== VHS ===
One VHS release consisting of highlights from the "East Meets West" five-episode arc, under the same name, was released by 20th Century Fox Home Entertainment in 1998. In the United Kingdom and Australia, two additional releases were released by Fox in 1999.

VHS name	Ep No.	Release date	Additional information
East Meets West	episode 1–5 highlights	1998	
Unchain My Heart	4	1999	UK and Australia
All in the Family	3	1998	UK and Australia

=== DVD ===
==== North America ====
Shout! Factory released the first volume of Ninja Turtles: The Next Mutation on DVD on September 4, 2012. On December 4, 2012 Shout! Factory released the second volume on DVD.

Title	No. of Eps	Release Date	Additional Information
Volume One	13	4 September 2012	Episodes 1–13
Volume Two	13+2	4 December 2012	Episodes 14-26, plus the two Power Rangers in Space crossover episodes: "Save Our Ship" & "Shell Shocked"
East Meets West	7	4 March 2014	Episodes 1-7
Turtle Power!	6+2	5 August 2014	Episodes 21–26, plus the two Power Rangers in Space crossover episodes: "Save Our Ship" & "Shell Shocked"
The Complete Series	26+2	10 May 2016	Episodes 1–26, plus the two Power Rangers in Space crossover episodes: "Save Our Ship" & "Shell Shocked"

==== United Kingdom ====
The complete series of the "Hero Turtles" version was released on DVD in the UK by Maximum Entertainment. The first eight episodes were released on a two-disc set before being separately split into their own releases. Another single volume containing Episodes 9-11 was also release before the rest of the series (Episodes 12–26) was released in a three-disc box set.

In addition to these releases, a "Mega Disc" containing the first eight episodes on one disc was also released, alongside a boxset containing the three single volumes that made up the first eleven episodes.

Title	Ep No.	Release date	Distributor	Additional information
Volume One	8	2 August 2004	Maximum Entertainment	Region 2
Volume One	5	October 2004	Maximum Entertainment	Region 2
Staff of Bu-Ki	3	21 March 2005	Maximum Entertainment	Region 2
All in the Family	3	2005	Maximum Entertainment	Region 2
Volume Two	15	11 February 2008	Maximum Entertainment	Region 2

In 2011, twelve single-release DVDs each containing two episodes were released as part of two box sets by Walk Distribution. A complete series set was released by Clear Vision on October 6, 2014, which was also available as two separate volume releases.

==== Europe ====
Some foreign territories have released the full-length form of episodes in their native languages, including Germany, France, Poland and Italy.

==== Australia/New Zealand ====
Title	Ep No.	Additional information
East Meets West	7	Episodes 1-7
Mutant Reflections	7	Episodes 8-14
The Good Dragon	6	Episodes 15-20
Brothers	6	Episodes 21-26

== Broadcast ==
In the United States, the show first aired from 1997 to 1998 on Friday afternoons on Fox Kids.

In the United Kingdom on BBC from October 1998 to Late March 1999 with a repeat from 1999-2000. The series also screened on Fox Kids UK from 1998 to 2003 and then on Kix! from 2012 to 2013. Currently, the show airs in reruns every morning on Canadian channel OUTtv.

== Distribution rights ==
In 2011, the copyright for the series was transferred from BVS Entertainment to Saban Brands. In September, Saban Brands announced that MarVista Entertainment had picked up international distribution rights. In 2018, the rights were transferred to Hasbro, as part of the acquisition of the Power Rangers brand, which included related intellectual property and content libraries previously owned by Saban Properties. Underlying rights to the original characters have been owned by Nickelodeon since 2009. The Canadian rights to the series are currently held by Shavick Entertainment, a co-producer of the show.
