= Kard Combat =

2011 video game

- Developer(s): Hothead Games
- Publisher(s): Hothead Games
- Producer(s): Hamish Millar
- Designer(s): Richard Garfield
- Platform(s): iOS
- Release: July 13, 2011
- Genre(s): Card game
- Mode(s): Single-player, multiplayer

Kard Combat is a 2011 card game developed and published by the Canadian indie studio Hothead Games. Released for iOS on July 13, 2011, it was co-designed by Richard Garfield, the game designer of the card game Magic: The Gathering.

== Reception ==
Reception

Aggregate score
| Aggregator | Score |
|---|---|
| Metacritic | 83/100 |

Review scores
| Publication | Score |
|---|---|
| Gamezebo | 90/100 |
| Pocket Gamer | 4/5 |
| TouchArcade | 3.5/5 |

Kard Combat received "generally favorable" reviews according to the review aggregation website Metacritic.

The game was positively received.
