= Kickin Momma =

2011 video game

- Developer: Hothead Games
- Platform: iOS
- Release: August 4, 2011
- Genre: Puzzle game
- Mode: Single-player

Kickin Momma is an iOS game developed by Canadian studio Hothead Games Inc. and released on August 4, 2011.

== Critical reception ==
The game has a Metacritic score of 75% based on 7 critic reviews.

TouchArcade wrote "Kickin Momma comes with enough levels to keep you busy for some time, especially if you go back to earn a gold medal on each one. Plus, there's Game Center achievements and leaderboards that increase the replay value even further." Appsafari said " The only downside to this game is that it does get a little repetitive, and that may annoy some." 148Apps wrote "Whether you know the games that inspired Kickin Momma or not, it stands on its own ugly workbooks as a wonderful addictive monster-kickin' good time." AppSpy said "Kickin Momma has a lot of charm and looks great, but some gameplay issues stop this from being the great title it could be." Slide To Play wrote "Kickin Momma is fun, but it lives in the shadow of Peggle."
