= Penny Arcade's On the Rain-Slick Precipice of Darkness 3 and 4 =

- Developer: Zeboyd Games
- Publisher: Penny Arcade
- Designers: Jerry Holkins; Mike Krahulik
- Engine: Torque
- Platforms: Windows, macOS, Xbox 360, iOS
- Release: On the Rain-Slick Precipice of Darkness 3 June 25, 2012; On the Rain-Slick Precipice of Darkness 4 June 7, 2013
- Genre: Role-playing
- Mode: Single-player

Penny Arcade's On the Rain-Slick Precipice of Darkness 3 and 4 are turn-based role-playing video games developed by Zeboyd Games and published by Penny Arcade. They were released on June 25, 2012, and January 24, 2013, respectively, for Windows, macOS, Xbox 360, and iOS. Sequels to a two-part episodic series starring the webcomic's characters Gabe and Tycho in a steampunk setting, they underwent a drastic change in gameplay, story and visuals under their new developers to resemble 16-bit JRPGs after Hothead Games dropped the series. They were nevertheless well-received by most critics, who praised their gameplay, story and low price point.

== Plot ==
=== On the Rain-Slick Precipice of Darkness 3 ===
The main game begins with Tycho receiving a phone call which is described as 10 minutes of silence, prompting Tycho and Gabe to go to the Arcadia boardwalk where they had previously defeated the mime god and members of his cult. Teaming up with Anne-Claire, they fight past the cultists, and eventually face off against a crabomancer, then, upon defeating it, recover pins which bestow classes on whoever wears one (similar to the job system in early Final Fantasy games). They return to their office, only to find that Dr. Blood has orchestrated the theft of the Necrowombicon. Anne-Claire returns home, Tycho and Gabe team up with Jim, a former colleague who lost his body in a work-related incident, reducing him to a skull floating in a jar of green liquid. Jim is unable to speak, but can follow Tycho and Gabe, as well as participate in combat. Following leads, they arrive at the museum of contemporary and ancient works, where Tycho is reunited with Moira, his ex-wife, who joins the party. When asked if they can re-recruit Anne-Claire, Tycho answers she is on vacation with her parents. The party discovers that a painting has been stolen from the museum, the painting being one of four representing the god of doors, Yog-Modaign, a death-god like figure.

Now also investigating the theft of the painting, the party, acting on advice of Dr. Euripides Hark, head for the Hark ancestral home. However, as the Harks are an old family and possess superior arcane know-how to Tycho, Tycho forces the party to use an alternate entrance, a trans-dimensional door accessible only via another dimension. The party returns to the detective agency to pick up a device capable of allowing them to enter this dimension, but it is revealed that, in his ignorance of what the object was (it resembles a stein), Gabe gave it to a local homeless man. The party goes to Hobo alley to recover it, and then head into the other dimension called the Periphery, represented by a stone path leading to multiple gateways, dotted with floating crystals. Tycho explains that the crystals are in fact, coffins, or time capsules, usually containing powerful mages or mythical creatures. Since the other dimension would survive any apocalypse, the contents of the crystal time capsules would inevitably be used to determine the properties of the world to come after the end of ours. The Brahe clan's long project, which Tycho and his family frequently speak of, is to wipe out these time capsules, as everyone would "get it wrong" and recreate the universe poorly.

Exiting in the Hark mansion, they find more class pins, and are trapped in a temporal shift, leaving Gabe and Jim trapped in the past. However, without anyone to tell him otherwise, Gabe smashes through the house, leaving open paths for Tycho and Moira, and indicating where they could eventually be found. At the end of the Hark house, they encounter Elizabeth Hark, head of a society worshiping mankind, who are trying to stop the revival of Yog-Modaign. She warns Tycho that even if the god is let loose, not to kill it, as having banished (or killed) two gods earlier, he is in danger of creating a power vacuum which a surviving god-entity could exploit to disastrous effect. At the end of their conversation, Dr. Blood appears again and steals another piece of the Yog-Modaign painting from the Harks.

In anticipation of Dr. Blood's next move, they go to intercept him at the Bank of Money. Unfortunately, they find that some of the vaults lead to other dimensions, including one similar to a medieval fantasy, and one resembling a starship from Star Trek. This slows them down considerably. They finally discover that the last painting is still in the hands of the Harks and that the four paintings are a prison of sorts for Yog-Modaign, as gods cannot be bound in cages, but can be bound in perfect representations, hence the painting so accurately represents the god, that it is the god, and when it is disassembled, so is the god. Before they can move to recover it, Tycho is alerted to some disaster by an amulet he is holding, and he forces the party to head to the Periphery. While there, they discover that Tycho has placed Anne-Claire in one of the crystal time capsules, in the belief that she would be an ideal candidate to remake the world after the upcoming apocalypse. Moira attempts to free her niece but they are interrupted by Yog-Modaign, whose avatar appeared near Anne-Claire specifically to lure Tycho to the periphery and buy Dr. Blood more time to assemble his painting. They defeat him only because he is unable to muster his full power.

The party finally heads to the Hark stronghold, which is full of cultists. They fight their way to the bottom where they defeat Elizabeth Hark and then Dr. Blood. After the last boss battle, Yog-Modaign makes a final appearance and tears Tycho apart, creating some kind of tear in the universe. Gabe and a weakened Dr. Blood are sent hurtling through empty space, while Gabe punches Dr. Blood repeatedly. Moira and Jim are sent to someplace resembling hell; while there, Jim appears as a humanoid made of green goo with his skull for a head. Jim is also able to speak and appears to know their location. Tycho is seen wearing a brown robe in a dark place where he recites the last verse of the poem by his dead father.

=== On the Rain-Slick Precipice of Darkness 4 ===
The fourth episode begins with Gabe and Dr. Blood crashing down onto a hellscape. Without other options, Gabe is forced to pair with Dr. Blood, who gleefully explains that when they defeated Yog Modaign, the apocalypse happened and the world was destroyed. Those closest to the epicenter were tossed into a dimension called Underhell, so-called because it resembles a massive floating continent, directly below the massive floating continent of Hell. Gabe reasons that Jim, Moira and Tycho must have been sent to Underhell as well and bargains with Dr. Blood to aid him in searching for them. Dr. Blood reveals his motivations: in his youth, he traded the soul of his lover Hestia for knowledge. He since had come to regret his actions, and engineered a premature apocalypse in order to send himself to Underhell, where he hoped to reunite with Hestia. Dr. Blood also informs Gabe that since they are not of the same make-up as Underhell, they cannot harm its inhabitants, meaning they must use Underhell monsters to fight for them (similar to Pokémon). They head towards a large pillar structure where Dr. Blood believes he will find Hestia.

Meanwhile, Moira and Jim have a similar conversation where Jim informs Moira they must use proxies to fight. Jim informs Moira that the Apocalypse failed to end all creation because there remains a single God maintaining Hell and Underhell. They fight their way through a castle filled with clones of Tycho (revealed to be his damned family) until they encounter the real Tycho, who can attack Underhell denizens with a magical sword he acquired. Tycho reveals that the structure of Hell and Underhell is such that Hell is held over Underhell by three massive pillars, and that if these are brought down, the resulting collapse would kill or at least reveal the location of the remaining God. He sends Moira and Jim to the first pillar, while he heads to the second.

At the first pillar, Gabe and Dr. Blood ascend and find that Hestia is present and seemingly the hostage of the Pillar boss. They defeat him, which causes the pillar to destabilize. Hestia accuses Dr. Blood of only making her life worse and reveals that she was in fact controlling the Pillar boss and his minions; she then kills Dr. Blood as the pillar collapses. Jim and Moira arrive in time to see the pillar fall and find Gabe and Hestia in the wreckage. Moira sends Gabe (now paired with Hestia) to the second pillar to meet Tycho, while they head to the last pillar.

At the second pillar, modeled after the tree Yggdrasil, Gabe and Hestia discover that a zoo had been built in the branches and that all the animals had escaped. They fight their way to the top, along the way freeing a flying demon whale. At the top, they team up with Tycho to kill the second pillar boss, a chimera composed of six animals. They defeat the pillar boss, causing the pillar to collapse. Tycho escapes by teleporting away, while Gabe and Hestia are rescued by the demon whale they released earlier.

At the third pillar, Moira and Jim find more of the damned Brahe family locked in combat with a group of technologically advanced librarians. The Brahes are trying to bring down the pillar while the librarians wish to safeguard it. Moira learns that Tycho is somewhat different from the rest of his family, in that he let Moira go, a first for a Brahe, which possibly saved her from their family curse. They assault the pillar and meet Tycho at the top, where they defeat the last pillar boss and bring down the pillar. This however, fails to destroy Hell or Underhell, and it is revealed that the Hell continent above Underhell is in fact the body of the last God, capable of remaining afloat on its own. Furthermore, the last God is revealed to be the series narrator, and the one who put the Brahes on the path to destroy the universe. It did this as it was completely omniscient and this drove it to madness. Tycho teleports again, leaving Moira and Jim behind.

Gabe and Hestia arrive on their demon whale, and the party, combined for the first time, flies to Hell/the body of the last God. There they fight their way through its body, destroying its Spleen and Heart before joining Tycho to kill its Brain. This however, is not enough and the last shred of the God's mind possesses Tycho. Gabe, Hestia, Moira and Jim defeat the God possessing Tycho, though Tycho still asks that he be killed so as to destroy the God for good and end creation. However, before he requests this, he summons the spirit of Lucifer inside of Gabe and commands it to merge with Gabe himself. Tycho tells Gabe that he is the Lightbringer named Lucifer, created to assist the Brahes in the Long Project. Gabe comes to terms with this and forgives his friend. Tycho says what remaining goodbyes can be given under the circumstances before Moira shoots him in the head.

In the epilogue, Tycho's niece, who he hid in a pocket dimension, wakes up and begins to create a new universe, thanking her Uncle for his sacrifice and saying she and "You" will take over. Two constellations appear in space: one of a wrench and one of a rake.

== Reception ==
Reception

Aggregate scores
Aggregator	Score
GameRankings	77.27% 78.00%
Metacritic	76/100

Review scores
Publication	Score
1Up.com	A−
GamesRadar+	4/5
IGN	8/10

Alex Roth of GamesRadar+ called Precipice of Darkness 3 a "lovingly rendered tribute to SNES-era RPGs", recommending it to people who enjoyed old-school RPGs and Penny Arcade, and saying that it was an easy buy at its $5 price point. Kat Bailey of 1UP.com also rated the game highly, describing its retro appearance as offering a "feeling of refreshment" needed by the series, though its battle system was deceptively modern. Derek Heemsbergen of RPGFan gave it a more mixed reception, calling it a good value but overly linear and "squandered potential". He noted that while the game had "clever" dungeon ideas and good writing, the overall setting was "uninspired".

John Tucker of RPGFan rated Precipice of Darkness 4 a bit more highly, describing it as feeling like it had large amounts of "padding" in order to extend its story an additional episode, but also saying that he was happy to have closure on the story. However, Mitch Dyer of IGN gave it a mixed review, calling it not as interesting as its predecessor and ultimately "forgettable", while stating that he disliked the "back-to-back-to-back-to-back boss fights" in late-game. Alex Fuller of RPGamer rated the game highly, praising its battle system and music.
