= The Simpsons: Hit & Run =

2003 action-adventure game

- Developer: Radical Entertainment
- Publisher: Vivendi Universal Games (Note: Released in PAL regions under the Sierra Entertainment brand name)
- Producers: John Melchior; Vlad Ceraldi
- Designer: Joe McGinn
- Programmers: Cary Brisebois; Nigel Brooke; Darren Esau
- Artist: Yayoi Maruno-Chorney
- Writers: Matt Selman; Tim Long; Matt Warburton
- Composers: Marc Baril; Jeff Tymoschuk; Allan Levy
- Series: The Simpsons
- Platforms: GameCube; PlayStation 2; Xbox; Windows
- Release: GameCube, PS2, Xbox: NA: September 16, 2003; EU: October 31, 2003; Windows: NA: November 11, 2003; EU: November 21, 2003
- Genres: Action-adventure, racing
- Modes: Single-player, multiplayer

The Simpsons: Hit & Run is a 2003 action-adventure game developed by Radical Entertainment and published by Vivendi Universal Games. It is based on the American animated television series The Simpsons, and is the 22nd installment in The Simpsons series of video games.

It follows the Simpson family and their friend Apu Nahasapeemapetilon as they witness many strange incidents that occur in Springfield; security cameras, mysterious vans, crop circles, and a "new and improved" flavour of the popular soft drink Buzz Cola that causes insanity. Taking matters into their own hands, they discover numerous shocking secrets, and soon realise these incidents are part of a larger alien conspiracy, caused by Kang and Kodos. The gameplay largely focuses on varied missions; players often race enemies and interact with supporting characters on timed quests, as well as engaging in side tasks and exploring Springfield.

Development of The Simpsons: Hit & Run began in late 2001 as a spiritual successor to Radical Entertainment's previous game The Simpsons: Road Rage (2001). Production was extensive, as the team sought to differentiate it from Road Rage, deeming that their new entry in the franchise required a different direction. It was heavily inspired by the Grand Theft Auto series, and the development team re-purposed the open world design and nuanced character development for the game. This encouraged collaboration with the show's writers and its cast, who helped to craft the story and dialogue. It was released in North America on September 16, 2003, and in Europe on October 21, 2003, for the GameCube, PlayStation 2 and Xbox. It was ported to Windows in North America on November 11, 2003, and in Europe on November 21, 2003.

The game received positive reviews from critics, who particularly praised its interpretation of The Simpsons as a video game, as well as its parodical take on Grand Theft Auto III (2001) and graphics; criticism mostly surrounded some aspects of gameplay, such as bugs and glitches. Often considered to be the best Simpsons tie-in game, Hit & Run was also a commercial success, with recorded sales of over 3 million worldwide by June 2007. It received the award for Fave Video Game at the 2004 Nickelodeon Australian Kids' Choice Awards. On the PlayStation 2, GameCube, and Xbox, it earned Greatest Hits, Player's Choice, and Platinum Hits respectively.

== Gameplay ==
Hit & Run (top) and Grand Theft Auto III (bottom). Hit & Run, inspired by the Grand Theft Auto series, shares some similarities with the games, including the radar, and a strong focus on their driving aspect

The Simpsons: Hit & Run features seven levels over three separate maps, each with missions and a sub-plot. The player can control one specific character in each level. The playable characters are Homer Simpson, Bart Simpson (both played twice), Lisa Simpson, Marge Simpson, and Apu Nahasapeemapetilon. When travelling on foot, the player character can walk, jump, run and perform three types of melee attacks: a normal kick, a jumping kick and a smashing move. To drive, the player can either hitchhike and control the driver in one of the many civilian vehicles that drive endlessly around town, or use a phone booth to select a car. Several hidden vehicles are present in each level and can also be used by the player if found. The game's driving missions are also similar to those of Grand Theft Auto III (2001). In both games, the player races against other characters, collects items before a timer runs out, and wrecks other cars.

The game has a sandbox-style format that emphasises driving, and the player controls their character from a third-person view. The character can perform certain acts of violence, punching, such as attacking pedestrians, blowing up vehicles, and destroying the environment. The Simpsons: Hit & Run has a warning meter that indicates when the police will retaliate for bad behaviour. Located in the bottom-right corner of the screen, the circular "hit and run" meter fills up when the character runs people over or destroys objects, and decreases when they cease doing so. When full, several police cars aggressively chase the character for the duration of the hit and run.

Each level contains items the player can collect, such as coins, which can be gathered by either smashing Buzz Cola vending machines, Buzz Cola boxes or wasp cameras, the latter of which become more elusive as the game progresses. The coins can be used to buy new cars and player outfits, some of which are required to progress through the game. The player can also collect trading cards, with seven cards hidden in each level. When the player collects all seven cards in a level, they will unlock one of seven tracks for the "Bonus Game" racing mini-game. When all 49 cards in the game are collected, the player unlocks a special The Itchy & Scratchy Show video. Several events cause the player to lose coins; because the character cannot die, injuries cause the player to lose coins. If the player is apprehended during a hit and run, they will be fined 50 coins.

== Plot ==
In the week leading up to Halloween, mysterious happenings are occurring in Springfield; a horde of wasp cameras descend upon the city, a "new and improved" brand of Buzz Cola is launched by the television personality Krusty the Clown and introduced to store shelves, and black vans begin appearing around town. Homer suspects that a black van outside his house is spying on his family, and he takes it upon himself to investigate who it belongs to, with the van eventually stopping in front of Mr. Burns' mansion. After helping Marge destroy several copies of a new violent video game, Homer accuses Burns of spying on Springfield, to which Burns reveals to Homer that the black vans were simply pizza vans and fires Homer for the accusation.

The next day, Bart tries to get a copy of the video game Bonestorm 2, only to find that it is sold out (with many of the other copies having been destroyed by Marge and Homer). After doing odd chores in the hopes of obtaining a copy, Bart eventually learns that Professor Frink is using many copies of video games to help power the Truckasaurus, and Bart agrees to help him build it, as well as set up a safe environment for it to operate in. After escaping Truckasaurus' wrath, a tractor beam abducts Bart outside the stadium. Lisa attempts to find Bart by exploring the town for clues. She learns that black sedans, which have been appearing around town, are connected to Bart's disappearance. Lisa eventually finds Bart on a ship in Springfield harbor, albeit with amnesia and mumbling unintelligibly while occasionally mentioning the sedans and cola.

Marge tries to figure out what has happened to Bart. As she investigates a crop circle that recently appeared in Cletus Spuckler's field, Grampa Simpson gives a description of a crop circle that matches that of the Buzz Cola logo. Marge shows a can of the cola to Bart, which snaps him out of his stupor. Bart reveals that Buzz Cola is a mind-control cola produced by aliens to make the townspeople insane. Marge attempts to purge Springfield of the cola, but despite her valiant efforts, the drink maintains its presence and popularity amongst the public.

Wracked with guilt over selling a tainted product, Apu Nahasapeemapetilon sets out to find the owner of the Buzz Cola trucks. After helping Snake with his community service, Apu learns that the cola trucks are registered to the Springfield Museum of Natural History. Apu and Bart go into the museum and discover that a meteor is the source of the cola. They then eavesdrop on a conversation between aliens Kang and Kodos, who are masterminding a scheme. Apu and Bart learn that the wasp cameras are filming the antics of Springfield for Kang and Kodos' struggling intergalactic reality show, Foolish Earthlings. The aliens intend to boost ratings to their show by spreading the cola into the town's water supply and distributing laser guns among the populace to drive the town to a violent massacre.

Apu is too frightened of the aliens to help further, so Bart asks Krusty for help to foil Kang and Kodos' plan. Krusty informs Bart that he has already helped the Duff Brewery set up free laser gun stands around Springfield, which Bart promptly destroys. Bart then goes with Homer to pursue Kang and Kodos to the brewery. The aliens escape and reveal that they have already released the cola throughout Springfield's water supply. As the cola seeps into the ground, it releases the undead from the Springfield Cemetery, who invade Springfield on Halloween night.

After Homer gathers supplies to protect his family and home from the marauding zombies, he decides to pursue an alien probe vehicle to the Springfield Nuclear Power Plant. There, he meets Frink, who has discovered the aliens' weakness to radioactive waste. Homer uses the spaceship's tractor beam to suck up cars loaded with drums of radioactive waste, causing the ship to explode and crash, killing Kang and Kodos. The next day, life in Springfield returns to normal, and Homer has become a celebrity to the fans of Foolish Earthlings.

== Development ==
The developer, Radical Entertainment, received the rights to create games for The Simpsons franchise when they demonstrated a playable prototype. Radical released its first The Simpsons game in 2001, called The Simpsons: Road Rage. After Road Rage was released, the 60-person development team for Hit & Run decided not to create a direct sequel to Road Rage; instead, Radical wanted to steer the franchise's video game series in a different direction by giving the game engine a complete overhaul. The developers felt that everything else needed a new approach, while only the driving portion of Road Rage was worth keeping; in Hit & Run, enhanced traffic artificial intelligence (AI) is introduced, which makes computer-controlled vehicles react better to the player's driving. The internal development name for The Simpsons: Hit & Run was simply "Simpsons", as referenced by the executable file of the game. They also decided to add an exploration element to the game to make players get out of the car and navigate the area on foot, so that the game offered a better experience of Springfield. Lead designer Joe McGinn said the game was pitched as "GTA for kids"; in addition to the exploration and freedom of Grand Theft Auto III (2001), the team was also influenced by the "action-movie-style" drifting and car physics of Driver (1999), and the platforming, character control and camera of Super Mario 64 (1996). Lead programmer Cary Brisebois considered the GameCube version the hardest to develop, with its 24MB of RAM necessitating tricks such as loading animations into audio memory. A port for the PlayStation Portable (PSP) entered development, but never released due to return on investment (ROI), as by then the voice actors had renegotiated their contracts to increase their fees.

When developing the graphics, the team decided to include landmarks from Springfield. The player is able to enter some of them, including the Kwik-E-Mart, Moe's Tavern, Springfield Elementary School, and The Android's Dungeon & Baseball Card Shop. During Hit & Run's development, 20th Century Fox, Gracie Films and Matt Groening, the creator of The Simpsons, played important roles in bringing The Simpsons universe into a 3D environment. All character voices were supplied by the actual cast, and the series' writers wrote the entire story for the game, including dialogue, with a total of 12,231 recorded lines; Yeardley Smith (Lisa Simpson) had more lines for the game than she would perform for a whole season of the show. Voice samples original to the game, as well as one-liner jokes from the show, can be heard in Hit & Run. Some of the dialogue from Road Rage was reused. Tim Ramage, the associate producer of the game's publisher, Vivendi Universal Games, considered it a blessing to have the opportunity of working with The Simpsons cast, along with the writers, with Ramage saying "...you have no concerns about quality; you know you're getting the best there is."

The game's soundtrack was primarily composed by Marc Baril, with additional compositions by Jeff Tymoschuk and Allan Levy. The soundtrack includes various arrangements of the original "The Simpsons Theme" by Danny Elfman, and features specific melodies for each playable character; for example, Bart's gameplay is accompanied by hard rock, while Lisa has laid-back motifs that Steven Hopper of GameZone compared to beach party films.

Vivendi Universal Games spent US$7 million marketing Hit & Run.

== Reception ==
Reception

Aggregate score
Aggregator	Score			
Aggregator	GameCube	PC	PS2	Xbox
Metacritic	79/100	82/100	78/100	81/100

Review scores
Publication	Score			
Publication	GameCube	PC	PS2	Xbox
AllGame	N/A	N/A	N/A	4.5/5
Electronic Gaming Monthly	7.17/10	N/A	7.17/10	7.17/10
Eurogamer	N/A	N/A	5/10	N/A
Famitsu	N/A	N/A	N/A	31/40
Game Informer	8.5/10	N/A	N/A	8.5/10
GamePro	N/A	N/A	4/5	N/A
GameRevolution	B	N/A	B	B
GameSpot	8.3/10	8/10	8.3/10	8.3/10
GameSpy	4.5/5	4.5/5	4.5/5	4.5/5
GameZone	8.7/10	8.6/10	8.6/10	9/10
IGN	8/10	8.1/10	8/10	8/10
Nintendo Power	3.8/5	N/A	N/A	N/A
Official U.S. PlayStation Magazine	N/A	N/A	4/5	N/A
Official Xbox Magazine (US)	N/A	N/A	N/A	8.8/10
PC Gamer (US)	N/A	78%	N/A	N/A
The Cincinnati Enquirer	4/5	N/A	4/5	4/5
Entertainment Weekly	B	N/A	B	B

The Simpsons: Hit & Run received "generally favorable" reviews on all platforms according to the review aggregation website Metacritic, and many consider it to be the best Simpsons game to date.

Over one million copies of the game were sold as of June 2004, and three million as of July 2007. It had sold 500,000 copies in the United Kingdom by January 2004. The game's PlayStation 2 version received a "Diamond" sales award from the Entertainment and Leisure Software Publishers Association (ELSPA), indicating sales of at least 1 million copies in the United Kingdom. According to the Fox executive producer John Melchior, Hit & Run sold 8-10 million units in its lifetime.

Praise focused on the move from The Simpsons television series to the video game format, while criticism targeted some aspects of its gameplay. Hit & Run won the award for Fave Video Game at the 2004 Nickelodeon Kids' Choice Awards.

A number of reviews complimented the transposition of The Simpsons television series to a video game. Justin Leeper of Game Informer and Alex Navarro of GameSpot commented on how well the game depicted the fictional city of Springfield from the television series, and called it the most accurate representation of Springfield ever put into a game. Official Xbox Magazine said that the game did the show justice, and Play felt that it was "essentially the show in real time", summing up its review by calling the game a "truly great cross-over product". Navarro thought that the humour that the game offered included many excellent self-referential jokes, and Eric Bush of TeamXbox concluded its review by predicting that the game would be extremely appealing to gamers, especially hardcore Simpsons fans. Entertainment magazine Variety surmised that Hit & Run was the first Simpsons game to include humor comparable to what was in the television series.

Hit & Run's parodical take on the Grand Theft Auto III video game was praised by several reviewers. Zach Meston of GameSpy considered it to "deftly satirize Grand Theft Auto while being almost as entertaining", and suggested that Hit & Run improved several gameplay aspects that it borrowed from Grand Theft Auto, including instant mission restarts, a superior guidance system, and an easily accessible collection of vehicles. Official Xbox Magazine agreed that Hit & Run was an excellent game in its own right, and found the game to be a "brilliant" Grand Theft Auto clone. The combination of The Simpsons universe with the gameplay of the Grand Theft Auto series was also praised by Douglass C. Perry of IGN as "pure brilliance".

Positive reviews of Hit & Run focused on its graphics and gameplay. Play appreciated the virtual world that the game offered, describing it as "grandiose in its expanse and artistic rendering". Navarro found the gameplay to be very engaging. Meston found the game to be "very fun and very funny", and Leeper called it "nothing short of astonishing". Despite positive reactions, the game also had serious issues that were brought up in several reviews, which focused on the game's bugs and glitches. Both Bush and Mr. Tickle of Game Revolution pointed out that Hit & Run had a few gameplay issues and graphical shortcomings that included strange artificial intelligence (AI) behaviour and a broken camera system, which they felt hindered the overall experience of the game.

Non-video game publications gave positive reception on the game as well. Nick Catucci of The Village Voice gave the Xbox version a score of nine-out-of-ten, and stated, "This delightful, deep, and detailed (but unfortunately not cartoon-style cel-shaded) rip on the Grand Theft Auto series critiques itself better than any untenured academic could." Marc Saltzman of The Cincinnati Enquirer gave the game four stars out of five and said that "What it lacks in originality it more than makes up for with its fun and easy-to-pick-up game play that will appeal to fans of the long-running comedy." Geoff Keighley of Entertainment Weekly gave it a B and said, "If some of the missions seem repetitive, others stand out, like the one that has you confiscating copies of a particularly violent videogame (wink, wink) corrupting Springfield's youth." Famitsu gave the Xbox version a score of three eights and one seven, for a total of 31 out of 40.

During the 7th Annual Interactive Achievement Awards, the Academy of Interactive Arts & Sciences nominated The Simpsons: Hit & Run for "Console Action/Adventure Game of the Year".

== Legacy ==
=== Cancelled sequel ===
After release, Radical immediately began work on a sequel, but were forced to cancel development when Vivendi chose not to renew its license to The Simpsons. According to lead designer Joe McGinn, multiple sequels were planned, but were halted by a representative at Vivendi.

=== Potential revival ===
In March 2026, showrunner Matt Selman stated that a sequel or remake are not ruled out as possibilities. In August 2026 at D23, when asked about a successor, series creator Matt Groening answered, "I think the original game is coming back in some form." Selman quickly added, "or not", suggesting the news was not intended to be revealed.

=== Modifications ===
In August 2021, the source code and asset files for Hit & Run were leaked on the anonymous imageboard website 4chan. The leak resulted in creation of various mods and unofficial patches to the game. Notable examples include the Fully Connected Map Mod that stitches together the game locations into one big level and the total conversion mod Futurama: Hit & Run that replaces the world and characters with the ones from creator Matt Groening's other animated sitcom Futurama while also adding brand new missions, with the latter mod receiving praise from McGinn. A fan-made Unreal Engine 5 remake of the game by Reuben "Reubs" Ward emerged in 2021, but was quickly shelved to avoid potential takedown notices. The remake resumed development in 2022 with no download links being provided.

=== Speedrunning ===
The Simpsons: Hit & Run has a dedicated speedrunning community with various competitions and events being held. The community received praise from McGinn, who stated "this is incredibly fun and heartwarming to see."
