= Swarm (2011 video game) =

2011 video game

- Cover art
- Developer: Hothead Games
- Publisher: Ignition Entertainment
- Composer: Marc Baril
- Platforms: PlayStation 3 (PSN), Xbox 360 (XBLA)
- Release: PlayStation 3: NA: March 22, 2011; EU: March 30, 2011; Xbox 360; March 23, 2011
- Genre: Platform
- Mode: Single-player

Swarm is an action-platform video game developed by Hothead Games and published by Ignition Entertainment for PlayStation 3 via the PlayStation Network and for the Xbox 360 via Xbox Live Arcade. The setting revolves around a flock of 50 blue bipedal creatures, dubbed swarmites, and their quest to collect DNA in order to save their race. The player controls the swarmites as a collective, but each swarmite has individual intelligence meaning interaction between the player and the swarm is always dynamic.

Critics generally felt the game was unique and that it featured impressive artificial intelligence. They also praised the game's dark humor, most notably for the different ways the swarmites can die. Some critics expressed frustration at the game's difficulty level. As of June 2011 the Xbox 360 version had reached 13,000 in sales, while the PlayStation 3 version showed numbers nearing 2,000 during the game's first month.

== Synopsis ==
The game begins by showing a pulsing blue blob arriving on a mysteriously war-torn and devastated planet. It plants itself into the ground and extends a wriggling tentacle. Out of the tentacle emerge 50 swarmites — small, blue, bipedal creatures who always move together in a pack, or swarm. The swarmites go in search of DNA, which the swarmites feed back into the blob to help it grow. The blob eventually transforms into a humongous swarmite referred to by the other swarmites as "momma".

== Gameplay ==
In Swarm the player controls a group of swarmites which work as a collective to achieve goals.

Swarm is an action-platform game in which the player controls up to 50 characters known as swarmites who operate as a collective to achieve their goals. The objective is to reach the end of the level with at least one swarmite remaining. Throughout the levels are health packs which will restore the swarmites' numbers to 50. The levels also contain checkpoints which serve as the point where players will resume play if they lose all 50 swarmites.

Points are earned by collecting strands of DNA found throughout the level. Some strands can only be collected by having several swarmites and using them collectively to retrieve the strand. The swarmites can huddle together for strength and speed boosts, stack on top of one another to reach high obstacles, and jump as a group to reach certain areas. All of the swarmites are controlled both individually as well as in a collective; each swarmite has their own unique AI that interacts with other swarmites and the commands given by the player. Swarmites will dynamically walk around objects and obstacles, each choosing their own path based on player commands.

== Development and marketing ==
Swarm began life as a submission to the Great Canadian Video Game Competition held by Telefilm Canada. The game was chosen as one of four finalists, and Hothead Games received $300,000 in order to fund further production on the game. It sprang from AI research by Dr. Mike Hayward, who was doing PhD research on how artificial life would interact one with another when given a task. "We were trying to enter an indie developer contest back in 2006, and Mike pitched this idea forward" stated producer Joel DeYoung. Lead Designer Pete Low stated that one of the biggest challenges was designing the camera controls to be able to accommodate all 50 swarmites. Each swarmite in the swarm is controlled by individual AI. The group does not have a leader, but instead interact with each other dynamically. "The idea is it's supposed to feel like controlling a flock of fish" stated Dr. Mike Hayward, who designed the AI. The game features leaderboards and in addition the PlayStation 3 version includes a live tally of the sum of all swarmites killed by players.

On June 17, 2010 Ignition Entertainment announced they would publish the title. The platforms for the game were announced November 18, 2010; the game would come to the PlayStation 3 via the PlayStation Network and to the Xbox 360 via Xbox Live Arcade. The game was completed in January 2011 and entered the Xbox Live Arcade and PlayStation Network submission process. It was later announced the developers were looking for a March 2011 release date.

To promote the game developer Hothead Games released several YouTube videos which discussed the gameplay and advertised the game. Four videos belong to a series entitled Ask Dr. Mike, in which Dr. Mike Hayward, designer of the AI, explains the dynamics of the game. Hayward and different co-hosts discuss how the swarmites interact with one another and their environment, how players can complete tasks within the game, and how players can reach high scores. Two viral videos were also released. The first was to promote the game's launch in Europe and depicts a young girl coloring pictures of swarmites. The girl soon turns violent on her drawings and the video shifts to show gameplay of the destruction of swarmites. The second depicted a fictional situation regarding workplace diversity and the recent hire of a swarmite. Avatar awards were also announced in March 2011 and consist of a swarmite pet and a swarmite hat for the player's avatar.

== Reception ==
Reception

Aggregate score
Aggregator	Score	
Aggregator	PS3	Xbox 360
Metacritic	71/100	69/100

Review scores
Publication	Score	
Publication	PS3	Xbox 360
Destructoid	N/A	7.5/10
Edge	6/10	6/10
Eurogamer	N/A	8/10
Game Informer	7.25/10	7.25/10
GameSpot	7.5/10	7.5/10
GameZone	7.5/10	N/A
Giant Bomb	3/5	3/5
IGN	8.5/10	8.5/10
Joystiq	3/5	N/A
Official Xbox Magazine (US)	N/A	7.5/10
PlayStation: The Official Magazine	7/10	N/A
Push Square	5/10	N/A
Metro	N/A	5/10

Swarm received "mixed or average reviews" according to the review aggregation website Colin Moriarty of IGN stated "the entire package has a slick coat of polish on it." One of the game's lower scores came from Ludwig Kietzmann of Joystiq, who felt that the PlayStation 3 version was "a good idea in need of better executions."

Multiple critics praised the game's dark humor. David Sanchez, reviewer for GameZone, stated "the little blue Swarmites are completely stupid, and they have a ridiculous charm to them that makes you want to see them meet their demise." Sanchez further noted that seeing the swarmites die was "strangely satisfying and totally hilarious." Moriarty called the swarmite deaths "saddening and necessary," but added that players will "never grow tired of seeing it happen." Ben Reeves of Game Informer also enjoyed the game's humor, but felt that there was not enough variety to keep a player's interest. "It may be fun to watch these little guys die, but there were too many moments where I wanted to kill the power to my console."

GameSpot's Nathan Meunier felt that it had an excellent scoring mechanic and that the rewards for killing swarmites were clever. He did not, however that the game had an "occasionally brutal" difficulty level and that it was too short. Reeves also agreed that the game had a high difficulty curve. He stated that "it can feel like a chore to master some of the later levels". The reviewer from Edge magazine echoed other critics' comments in regard to difficulty, "Swarm will provide a stern test of both skill and patience." The reviewer for PlayStation: The Official Magazine felt that a stronger focus on simply clearing the levels could have been utilized, but noted that it was still a "surprisingly challenging—and splattering—good time." Official Xbox Magazine's Cameron Lewis praised the games light-hearted attitude, sharp graphics and control scheme. He further noted that an "emphasis on constant scoring keeps the action trucking at a steady clip."

In its first two weeks the PSN version sold over 4,200 units. The Xbox Live Arcade version sold over 7,700 units in the same time frame. As a technology demo game won the People's Choice Award at the 2007 Arcadia Festival. As of June 2011 the Xbox 360 version had reached 13,000 in sales, while the PlayStation 3 version showed numbers nearing over 2,000 during the game's first month. Year-end 2011 sales for Xbox Live Arcade version exceeded 20,000 units.
