= Venus (Teenage Mutant Ninja Turtles) =

Fictional character within the Teenage Mutant Ninja Turtles franchise

Venus de Milo
- Venus in a promotional image from Ninja Turtles: The Next Mutation

Publication information
- Publisher: Saban Entertainment; Mirage Studios; IDW Publishing; Boom! Studios
- First appearance: Ninja Turtles: The Next Mutation "East Meets West (September 1997)"
- First comic appearance: Teenage Mutant Ninja Turtles #127 (March 2022)
- Created by: Kevin Eastman; Dan Clark
- Voiced by: Lalainia Lindbjerg

In-story information
- Full name: Mei Pieh Chi (The Next Mutation and MMPR/TMNT ) Bonnie (originally) (IDW comics)
- Species: Mutant turtle (The Next Mutation); Human-born mutant frog (formerly), Patchwork mutant "turtle" (IDW comics)
- Team affiliations: Teenage Mutant Ninja Turtles; Punk Frogs (formerly) (IDW comics)
- Partnerships: Donatello; Michelangelo; Leonardo; Raphael; Splinter (The Next Mutation); Chung I (The Next Mutation); Bludgeon (IDW comics); Jennika (IDW Comics)
- Abilities: Apprentice shinobi and shaman Experienced fighter

Venus de Milo (often shortened to simply Venus, and later known as Bonnie) is a superheroine within the Teenage Mutant Ninja Turtles franchise. She first appeared in the television series, Ninja Turtles: The Next Mutation. There, she was portrayed by Nicole Parker and voiced by Lalainia Lindbjerg. She was the only female turtle prior to the introduction of Jennika in the IDW continuity in 2015, and Lita the following year. Venus is currently the only turtle named after a work of art, rather than an artist like the rest of the turtles.

== Fictional character biography ==
Venus was one of five turtles exposed to mutagen in the sewers. When Splinter gathered up all the turtles, he mistakenly left Venus behind. Somehow making her way to Chinatown, she was discovered by a shinobi magician called Chung I. Chung I took the turtle with him to China where he raised her as a daughter and named her Mei Pieh Chi. He also trained the turtle in the art of Shinobi.

Apparently, Chung I would, on occasion, travel to the realm of dreams and encounter Splinter. Each swapped stories of their turtles, choosing to keep them a secret until the time was right. In his possession, Chung I also had a glass mirror, within which were trapped humanoid Dragons. It was Chung I's purpose to make sure the Dragons would never escape the mirror. The Dragons eventually crossed over into the realm of dreams, attacking Chung I and kidnapping Splinter's spirit. On his deathbed, Chung I revealed to Venus her true origin and told her place was in New York.

Venus traveled to New York, where she encountered the Teenage Mutant Ninja Turtles watching over the spiritless body of their master. After helping the turtles put an end to Shredder and the Foot Clan, she led them on a dream walk to rescue their master's spirit. Unbeknownst to her, the Dragons used this opportunity to enter the physical world.

To celebrate their seeming victory, the five turtles and Splinter went for a picnic in the park but were attacked by the Dragons. In the struggle, a statue of a woman was damaged when its arms broke off. Upon winning the battle, Mei Pieh Chi took the statue with her to the lair. This earned her the nickname of Venus de Milo after the famous statue, mimicking the other Turtles' artist namesakes.

Venus seemed to have lived a sheltered life in China. Over the course of the series, Venus was portrayed as blissfully ignorant of some parts of western life and culture and, at times, equally naïve towards life in general. While proficient in fighting techniques, Venus was not trained in Ninjutsu like her brothers and thus, she would often use mystical orbs in battle (to various degrees of success).

It was established early on in the series that, while the four turtles were raised as brothers, none of them (including Venus) were biologically related. This was done by the writers so as not to eliminate the possibility of a romantic relationship between Venus and one of the four male turtles, with hints leading primarily to Raphael and Leonardo.

=== Further appearances ===
After the cancellation of the show, an informal "second season" was formed on the franchise's official website, consisting of letters "written by" each of the turtles (the site has since been removed because of the sale to Viacom). A letter dated October 1997 and called "Venus' Venerations" was added to the website, chronicling Venus' adventures alongside the turtles.

After co-creator Kevin Eastman sold his share of the property to Peter Laird, "Venus' Venerations" was discontinued and Venus' letters were removed from the site. The rest of the Turtles' letters, however, remained and no explanation was given for Venus' sudden disappearance.

== Comics ==
Venus (Bonnie) as originally depicted in the IDW comics

In the Image Comics series, writer Gary Carlson received only a few rules on what not to do, one of which being: "No female turtles." Venus was, however, parodied in the twelfth issue of the third volume, when an alien named Lurch transformed into a female turtle looking very similar to Venus. Some issues were even advertised with the slogan: "No girl turtle guaranteed."

=== IDW Comics ===
A new version of Venus was released in the IDW Comics continuity with Issue #127 on March 30, 2022. This incarnation started as a Frankenstein-like creature created by the mad mutant surgeon Doctor Jasper Barlow from the remains of a female Punk Frog named Bonnie. She has a deep connection with Donatello. After escaping Barlow's lab, she leaves both Donatello and her former Punk Frog friend, Clyde, as she knew nothing of her past life and knew she'd meet Donatello again. Eventually she meets a mutant shark; Bludgeon who had sensed her powers and wanted to help.

Over time, Venus begins to rebuild herself with her abilities. And after being transported to a possible future unintentionally by Donatello along with Bludgeon, she sees the future "whole" version of herself moments before Armaggon arrived to consume them all. Venus tried to save her future self, who used her mystical abilities to restore her memories of her past and passed on her own knowledge before being consumed. Venus also became physically whole in the process, fully a turtle and resembling her future self.

Later, when Donatello attempts to stop Armaggon, whom he had unwittingly unleashed in the first place, from eliminating the Turtles from the timestream, Venus accompanies him into the past and the future. After a turbulent journey and encounters with their past and future selves, they realize that Armaggon's creation and rampage is an inevitable aspect of the Turtles' reincarnation from their human selves in feudal Japan to their present mutant forms. In order to close this circle, Venus sacrifices her life to Armaggon in Donatello's place; her spirit later briefly returns to the mortal world in the past to infuse the then-unmutated Turtles and Splinter with the quantum-temporal impressions (called "quantumnucleid acid") their existence has left in the timestream, thus triggering their rebirth. Telling them that she will see them "one day soon", she joins the spirits of Hamato Yoshi and Tang Shen.

=== MMPR/TMNT ===
A new version of Venus (known as Mei Pieh Chi, the same name being from her iteration in The Next Mutation) was introduced by Boom! Studios in the third Mighty Morphin Power Rangers/Teenage Mutant Ninja Turtles crossover miniseries, hailing from an alternate Earth to the main Turtles.

== In other media ==
- She and the other turtles teamed up with the Power Rangers in Space in the 1998 episode, 'Shell Shocked'.
- In the 50th episode of Robot Chicken, titled, "Moesha Poppins" (2007), Venus makes a very short cameo in a "Where Are They Now" sketch, revealing that, after being kicked off the team, she tried to flush herself down the toilet and drowned.
- In an episode of 2012's TMNT animated TV series, Raphael paints a female turtle-human hybrid (done in the style of fifties pin-up girls), on the side of the Turtles' new Party Wagon, which Donatello admires approvingly. The painting was named "Venus". In a later episode, Michelangelo gets captured in a trap that will give him a second mutation. He pictured mutating into a female turtle, which is positioned in the same posture as Venus in her promotional image, sitting and leaning back sensually, and he screamed in horror at the thought of it.

== Controversy ==
Original Turtles co-creator Peter Laird has called the idea of a fifth turtle "creatively bankrupt". During an interview, Kevin Munroe, director of the TMNT animated film, elaborated on Peter Laird's instructions saying that, "There's absolutely no mention of Venus de Milo, the female Turtle. You can't even joke about that with Peter. It's just one of those things that he hates with a passion." Fellow Turtles co-creator Kevin Eastman has said he likes the character.
