= DeathSpank =

2010 video game

- Promotional artwork for DeathSpank
- Developer: Hothead Games
- Publisher: Electronic Arts
- Designer: Ron Gilbert
- Platforms: Microsoft Windows, Mac OS X, PlayStation 3, Xbox 360
- Release: PlayStation 3 July 13, 2010; Xbox 360; July 14, 2010; Microsoft Windows; October 26, 2010; Mac OS X December 14, 2010
- Genre: Action role-playing
- Modes: Single-player, multiplayer

DeathSpank, also known as DeathSpank: Orphans of Justice, is an action role-playing video game developed by Hothead Games and published by Electronic Arts. It was created by game designers Ron Gilbert and Clayton Kauzlaric. The game was released on July 13, 2010 on the PlayStation 3 via the PlayStation Network and on July 14, 2010 on the Xbox 360 via Xbox Live Arcade. The Microsoft Windows and Mac OS X versions were released October 26, 2010 and December 14, 2010 respectively, via Steam.

DeathSpank follows the titular character DeathSpank in his quest to find an item known as The Artifact. The game was originally supposed to be the first of a two-part series. The second half of the series, entitled DeathSpank: Thongs of Virtue, was first released on September 20, 2010. Gilbert described DeathSpank as being "Act I" in the story, and Thongs of Virtue as being "Acts II and III". However, it was later announced that DeathSpank was returning for a third game, The Baconing, abandoning the protagonist's name in its title. The third game was released on August 30, 2011.

DeathSpank received generally positive reviews from critics, who cited influences from both the Monkey Island and Diablo games.

== Gameplay ==
The world of DeathSpank features a combination of 2D and 3D objects.

DeathSpank is an action role-playing game which also features elements from graphic adventure games. Combat gameplay is similar to Diablo. Players can acquire several pieces of armor and weaponry, each with different abilities and attributes. During combat players can chain attacks in combos, which in turn deal more damage with each hit. As more hits are gained on enemies, DeathSpank's Justice Meter will fill. Once full, the player can unleash more powerful attacks for a limited time.

In-game conversations with non-player characters are also a large part of the game. DeathSpank features advanced dialog options, similar to LucasArts' Monkey Island series which play a large part in unfolding the game's story. These conversations may lead to quests for DeathSpank. In all, the game features 79 side quests in addition to the 33 quests required to advance the main plot. Once the game is completed the player can return and complete any unfinished side quests.

DeathSpank is designed to be playable in short segments, and has three difficulty levels. It contains about 8 to 12 hours of gameplay depending on choices made by the player during the game. The world of DeathSpank is presented as a rotating cylinder, with the display having a rounded element, similar to Animal Crossing: Wild World. The world is a mixture of 2D and 3D props on 3D terrain, and is rendered without load screens as the player moves between areas. The game also features a local cooperative mode, in which the second player takes the role of Sparkles the Wizard. Sparkles is equipped with multiple spells which provide support to DeathSpank, including a healing spell.

== Synopsis ==
DeathSpank is set in a fantasy medieval world. It revolves around a character named DeathSpank, who has searched his entire life for an item known as The Artifact, a mysterious object whose purpose is equally mysterious. He travels with a wizard known as Sparkles, and the duo seek to claim The Artifact and rid the land of evil. The story begins with The Artifact just out of DeathSpank's reach. Unable to claim it, he meets with a local witch, who promises to help him in exchange for his services. He provides her with her requested items, and eventually obtains The Artifact.

The victory is short lived, however, as a group of henchmen who serve the evil Lord Von Prong steal The Artifact and all of DeathSpank's equipment. Traveling to a nearby town, he earns new weaponry from the townsfolk in exchange for doing good deeds. Re-equipped, he sets his sights back on The Artifact and Lord Von Prong. After a lengthy journey with several side quests throughout various locations, DeathSpank faces off against Lord Von Prong. He defeats Von Prong, and DeathSpank ends with a prelude to the game's sequel.

== Development and marketing ==
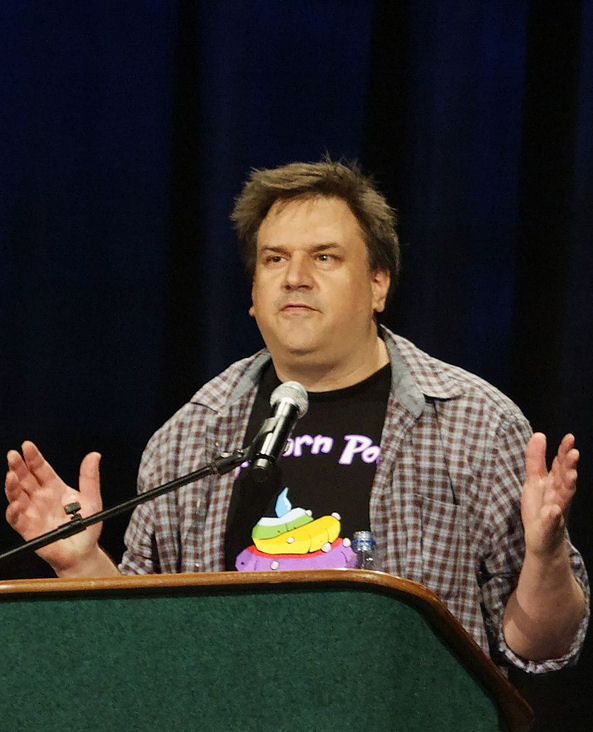
DeathSpank was designed by Ron Gilbert, whose works include The Secret of Monkey Island and Maniac Mansion.

DeathSpank was first confirmed on January 9, 2008 via a press release. The release stated that game designer Ron Gilbert would be joining forces to develop the game. Gilbert described it as "Monkey Island meets Diablo." Three cinematic teaser trailers for DeathSpank were shown at Penny Arcade Expo 2008. During the 2009 Penny Arcade Expo DeathSpank was showcased at the Hothead Games booth, with live gameplay being demonstrated by staff, along with examples of story elements, and dialogue trees. It was announced on March 4, 2010 that Electronic Arts would publish the game.

The game was released on July 13, 2010, on the PlayStation Network and July 14, 2010, on Xbox Live Arcade. It was later released for Microsoft Windows on October 26, 2010, and on Mac OS X December 14, 2010. The PC and Mac OS X versions support a wide range of resolutions, the ability to run the game windowed, input by keyboard and mouse as well as gamepad, alternate control schemes, and a key mapping ability. Gameplay enhancements based on feedback from the console versions include an equipment comparison function, a treasure chest feature in each town and major area, a new streamlined user interface and more. These versions also make use of Steam's cloud saving and achievement functionalities and leaderboards.

In an interview with Gamasutra in June 2008, Gilbert stated that DeathSpank would be an episodic series of games. On March 30, 2009, Ron Gilbert confirmed on his blog that the game would no longer be episodic. Gilbert later revealed that the game had once again become episodic due to the game's size. "Towards the end of production it was determined what we had built was too big for a downloadable game, so the decision was made to split the game in half and the climactic battle with Lord Von Prong was the perfect place. That battle is in essence the end of Act I and it had a nice WTF moment that provided a nice cliff hanger" he stated. Gilbert has described DeathSpank as being "Act I" in his story, and Thongs of Virtue as being "Acts II and III".

The title character originated in Ron Gilbert's Grumpy Gamer comics, created by Gilbert and Clayton Kauzlaric, who they later developed further. The character DeathSpank is voiced by Michael Dobson. Gilbert and Kauzlaric created a rough design for the game and pitched it to publishers for over four years without success. Previously, Gilbert had consulted for Penny Arcade Adventures: On the Rain-Slick Precipice of Darkness at Hothead Games; he contacted them and a deal was struck for the company to develop the game. A more in-depth design for DeathSpank was then produced. Kauzlaric remained involved with the project, consulting on design, story and concept art. Gilbert departed Hothead Games upon completion of the game.

== Reception ==
DeathSpank

Aggregate scores
Aggregator	Score
GameRankings	80% (PC); 79% (PS3); 80% (X360)
Metacritic	78/100 (PC); 79/100 (PS3); 79/100 (X360)

Review scores
Publication	Score
1Up.com	B
Eurogamer	6/10
GameRevolution	A−
GameSpot	8/10
IGN	8.5/10
Joystiq	5/5
VideoGamer.com	7/10
X-Play	4/5
Good Game	8/10

DeathSpank has received generally positive reviews from critics. At aggregate website GameRankings it holds scores of 79-80% for the platforms it was released on. Fellow aggregate website Metacritic reports similar scores, with both the PlayStation 3 and Xbox 360 versions averaging 79/100 and the PC version holding a score of 78/100. The game has sold over 91,000 units as of October 2010 with a total of over 97,000 units as of year-end 2010. Year-end 2011 analyses showed a movement of over 122,000 units. The PlayStation 3 version sold similarly, with nearly 107,000 units sold at the end of 2010. Some critics cited elements The Secret of Monkey Island and Diablo in the game.

The game's humor was lauded among most critics. Thierry Nguyen of 1UP.com enjoyed the character's interactions, and noted, "a sort of deadpan absurdity where pretty much anything [...] gets said as naturally as we would discuss the time of day." Game Revolution's Duke Ferris agreed, and stated the game was "genuinely funny." He then pointed out several instances of humorous quests, conversations, and actions. XPlay's Rob Manuel stated that "most of the thanks here should go to Ron Gilbert." He then referenced two of Gilbert's previous games, The Secret of Monkey Island and Maniac Mansion. Manuel went on to add, "his sharp and often dark sense of humor permeates everything from quests to settings." Eurogamer's Dan Pearson felt the humor was borderline irreverent and said, "I can't help feel I'm not really part of DeathSpank's target audience."

Critics universally applauded the unique art style of DeathSpank. GameSpot's Tom Mc Shea called the visuals "imaginative", and added, "the colorful visuals are reason enough to check out every corner." The reviewers from Australia's Good Game said they "liked [DeathSpank's] rolling countryside effect, so you feel like you're walking around a small planetoid filled with pop-up 2D sprites." Joystiq's Randy Nelson lauded the visual and audio design of the game, and stated, "[it] resonates with charm created by artists, animators and Gilbert's own writing." GamePro's Will Herring added that the game had a "charming visual design."

The gameplay was also point of high praise among most reviewers, however elements of it were criticized. Martin Gaston of VideoGamer.com stated, "the game goes out of its way to ensure you're always taking on new and different enemies." Randy Nelson of Joystiq noted that the game was diverse in its puzzles, adding that the developers strayed from stereotypical quotas such as killing a certain number of enemies. IGN's Kristine Steimer disagreed, and noted that due to experiences in past Gilbert-designed games, she expected more quests which included puzzles. She stated, "I was expecting a bit more given the developer's background." Martin Gaston of VideoGamer.com later stated that DeathSpank "all feels a bit diluted, as if a single drop of Diablo and Monkey Island has been added to an entire gallon of water." Destructoid's Nick Chester praised the combat system and role-playing elements. "Chaining attacks is exceedingly satisfying, experimenting with various weapon combinations nearly as addictive as finding them in the first place" stated Chester Some reviewers noted that the addition of cooperative gameplay, while welcome, was unbalanced and underdeveloped. GamePro's Will Herring disagreed and stated that the second player's character "won't steal the screen from the titular lead, but the option to team up and complete the game with a friend is a fun and worthwhile distraction."

The PC version of the game received praise for its faithful reproduction of gameplay from the console versions. The addition of keyboard and mouse gameplay received mixed views from critics. Game Revolution's Josh Laddin felt that the keyboard controls were frustrating and said, "the keyboard controls aren't as intuitive as a gamepad." However Marko Djordjevic of GameFocus disagreed and stated, "once you get the hang of it [...] it feels exactly as you’d expect." Djordjevic further appreciated that the cooperative gameplay was ported over from the console versions.

== Sequels ==
DeathSpank: Thongs of Virtue, the second title in the series, was announced August 23, 2010 and first released September 20, 2010. It continues where DeathSpank ends, and features the use of ranged weapons such as machine guns and rocket launchers. It was first released on the PlayStation 3 on September 21, 2010. The Xbox 360 version was released September 22, 2010 and the PC version November 30, 2010. The Mac OS X version was December 14, 2010.

A third game, The Baconing, was released in August 2011. The plot follows DeathSpank after he decides to try on all of the Thongs of Virtue at once. This spawns an evil incarnation of himself, the Anti-Spank. DeathSpank must travel to the Fires of Bacon to destroy the thongs and the Anti-Spank. It will be the first DeathSpank title not to feature the titular character in its name; it has been reported that this has nothing to do with the departure of Ron Gilbert from Hothead Games.
