= Kill Shot (video game) =

2014 video game

- Developer: Hothead Games
- Publisher: Hothead Games
- Platforms: iOS, Android
- Release: 24 September 2014
- Genre: First-person shooter
- Mode: Single-player

Kill Shot is a 2014 mobile first-person shooter game developed by Hothead Games.

== Gameplay ==
Players complete missions to collect in-game money. In each mission, players must kill a minimum number of enemies. Missed targets may flee and cause the player to fail. Using either in-game money or premium purchases, players can upgrade their equipment, allowing them to complete black ops missions with tougher requirements. Players may also engage in daily challenges, which are offered over a 28-day period. A special multiplayer mode is available.

== Reception ==
Metacritic, a review aggregator, rated the iOS version 57/100 based on five reviews. Though Pocket Gamer criticized the game's graphics and real-money upgrades, they called it "still super enjoyable in an effervescent, wholly disposable sort of a way". Brittany Vincent of Gamezebo rated it 3/5 stars and wrote that Kill Shot' many upgrades are fun at first, but it soon becomes repetitive and reliant on microtransactions. Jennifer Allen of 148apps.com rated it 3/5 stars and wrote, "Kill Shot is often satisfying, but its more than pushy in-app purchases will leave you feeling a little bummed."

== Lawsuit ==
In November 2014, Glu Mobile sued Hothead Games, alleging that Kill Shot copied Deer Hunter 2014. Hothead Games settled out of court in August 2015.

== Sequel ==
A sequel, Kill Shot Bravo, was released on 17 November 2015.
