= Hothead Games =

Canadian video game developer

Hothead Games Inc.
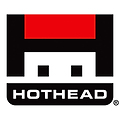
- Type: Private
- Industry: Video games
- Founded: 2006; 20 years ago
- Founders: Steve Bocska; Vlad Ceraldi; Joel DeYoung
- Defunct: December 13, 2024
- Fate: Bankruptcy
- Headquarters: Vancouver, Canada
- Area served: Worldwide
- Key people: Ian Wilkinson (President and CEO)
- Website: hotheadgames.com

Hothead Games Inc. was an independent Canadian video game developer based in Vancouver.

== History ==
The studio was founded in 2006 by Steve Bocska, Vlad Ceraldi and Joel DeYoung, all three of which were formerly employed by Radical Entertainment. Bocska left the company in 2007. On 10 March 2009, Ian Wilkinson, who had been president and chief executive officer of Radical Entertainment since its foundation in 1991 until 2008, became president and chief executive officer of Hothead Games, replacing Ceraldi. In turn, Ceraldi became the studio's director of game development, while DeYoung moved from his chief operating officer position to director of game technology.

Following the conclusion of the DeathSpank series and the departure of its creator Ron Gilbert in 2011, Hothead Games shifted its development focus entirely to mobile games in response to market trends surrounding mobile devices. In 2015, Hothead Games expanded by opening a studio in Halifax, Nova Scotia with an initial development team of 25 people, putting the company's employee count at 130. In 2019, Hothead Games established a publishing arm to promote third-party free-to-play titles.

On 14 October 2021, Embracer Group announced that its subsidiary DECA Games had acquired the Hothead Games titles Hero Hunters and Kill Shot Bravo. In January 2022, Vlad Ceraldi left Hothead Games to fill the CEO position of independent game developer Offworld Industries. In December 2024, president and CEO Ian Wilkinson announced on LinkedIn that the company had filed for bankruptcy and would close down.

In December 2024, following the shutdown of Hothead Games, Wilkinson and Tim Bennison, Hothead Games's former chief operating officer (COO), founded New Radical Games, again assuming the roles of president, CEO and COO, respectively.

== Games developed ==
Year	Title	Platform(s)	Publisher(s)
2008	Penny Arcade Adventures: On the Rain-Slick Precipice of Darkness, Episode One	macOS, Microsoft Windows, PlayStation 3, Xbox 360	Hothead Games
2008	Penny Arcade Adventures: On the Rain-Slick Precipice of Darkness, Episode Two	macOS, Microsoft Windows, PlayStation 3, Xbox 360	Hothead Games
2010	DeathSpank	macOS, Microsoft Windows, PlayStation 3, Xbox 360	Electronic Arts
2010	DeathSpank: Thongs of Virtue	macOS, Microsoft Windows, PlayStation 3, Xbox 360	Electronic Arts
2011	Swarm	PlayStation 3, Xbox 360	Ignition Entertainment
2011	Kickin Momma	iOS	Hothead Games
2011	The Baconing	macOS, Microsoft Windows, PlayStation 3, Xbox 360	Hothead Games
2011	Kard Combat	iOS	Hothead Games
2011	Sea Stars	Android, iOS	Hothead Games
2012	Big Win Soccer	Android, iOS	Hothead Games
2012	Big Win Hockey	Android, iOS	Hothead Games
2012	Big Win Baseball	Android, iOS	Hothead Games
2012	Big Win Basketball	Android, iOS	Hothead Games
2013	Rivals at War	Android, iOS	Hothead Games
2013	Rivals at War: 2084	Android, iOS	Hothead Games
2013	Big Win Racing	Android, iOS	Hothead Games
2014	Rivals at War: Firefight	Android, iOS	Hothead Games
2014	Kill Shot	Android, iOS	Hothead Games
2015	Big Win Football 2016	Android, iOS	Hothead Games
2015	Boom Boom Football	Android, iOS	Hothead Games
2015	Kill Shot Bravo	Android, iOS	Hothead Games
2016	Boom Boom Soccer	Android, iOS	Hothead Games
2017	Kill Shot Virus	Android, iOS	Hothead Games
2017	Mighty Battles	Android, iOS	Hothead Games
2018	Hero Hunters	Android, iOS	Hothead Games
2018	Forged Fantasy	Android, iOS	Hothead Games
2019	Idle Golf Tycoon	Android, iOS	Hothead Games
2019	Idle Property Manager Tycoon	Android, iOS	Hothead Games
2020	Super Hit Baseball	Android, iOS	Hothead Games
2020	Box Office Tycoon	Android, iOS	Hothead Games
2024	Big Win Football 2024	Android, iOS	Hothead Games
