= The Baconing =

2011 video game

- Title art
- Developer: Hothead Games
- Publisher: Electronic Arts
- Series: DeathSpank
- Platforms: Mac OS X, Microsoft Windows, PlayStation 3, Xbox 360
- Release: NA: August 30, 2011 (PS3); WW: August 31, 2011
- Genre: Action role-playing
- Modes: Single-player, multiplayer

The Baconing is an action role-playing video game developed by Hothead Games. It was published by Valcon Games on the Xbox 360 and independently on all other platforms. It was released in August 2011 for PlayStation 3 via the PlayStation Network, for Mac OS X and Microsoft Windows via Steam, and for the Xbox 360 via Xbox Live Arcade. It is the third game in the DeathSpank series, and follows the character DeathSpank in his quest to defeat the AntiSpank, an evil incarnation of himself.

The game received mixed views from critics. Most critics enjoyed the game's humor, and those who did not noted that players who enjoyed the humor from the previous two games will enjoy The Baconing. Critics were divided as to aspects of gameplay. Some thought that the game had too many repetitive quests, while others felt that gameplay was tightened in comparison to the previous two DeathSpank games.

== Premise ==
The game world in The Baconing is much more varied than that of the previous two DeathSpank titles.

The game opens with a bored DeathSpank, the series' protagonist. Having defeated all of his foes in the land, he decides to try on all six mystical Thongs of Virtue at once, and in doing so inadvertently creates an evil incarnation of himself, the AntiSpank. DeathSpank must then travel the land to destroy five of the six Thongs of Virtue in the Fires of Bacon. Once he is successful he can defeat the AntiSpank and bring peace to SpankTopia.

== Gameplay ==
The Baconing borrows much of its gameplay from the two previous titles in the DeathSpank series, DeathSpank, and DeathSpank: Thongs of Virtue. As with the previous games, this title is an action RPG. The game can also be played cooperatively, with the first player controlling DeathSpank and the second having a choice to control one of four sidekicks. Hothead Games addressed a concern from fans about fetch quests, a quest which involves retrieving an object for the person giving the player character the quest. The player can now have the character execute a shield bash to push enemies away. This ability can also be used to reflect incoming arrows back toward enemies.

== Development and marketing ==
The Baconing was announced on May 25, 2011 for the Mac OS X, Microsoft Windows, PlayStation 3. DeathSpank was dropped from the game's title, though it is a continuation of the DeathSpank series. Producer Mike Inglehart stated "This new title isn't DeathSpank 3 or DeathSpank: The Baconing, instead it should be thought of as The Baconing." Inglehart elaborated by saying that "this is a standalone experience that will appeal to fans of the DeathSpank character, but also to gamers everywhere who love unique and engaging video games." Inglehart also clarified that the DeathSpank prefix was not removed due to copyright or trademark issues.

To promote the game Hothead Games ran an Ask DeathSpank questionnaire on game's official website. Fans could submit their questions to be answered by the game's protagonist. It was released on August 30, 2011 in the U.S. on the PlayStation 3 as part of the PSN Play promotion on the PlayStation Network, and on August 31, 2011 in the PAL region. The Mac OS X, Microsoft Windows and Xbox 360 versions were released on the same day.

== Reception ==
Reception

Aggregate score
Aggregator	Score		
Aggregator	PC	PS3	Xbox 360
Metacritic	63/100	65/100	64/100

Review scores
Publication	Score		
Publication	PC	PS3	Xbox 360
The A.V. Club	N/A	N/A	B−
Destructoid	N/A	N/A	6/10
Eurogamer	N/A	6/10	N/A
GamePro	N/A	3.5/5	3.5/5
GameRevolution	N/A	B+	B+
GameSpot	N/A	N/A	6.5/10
IGN	6/10	6/10	6/10
Joystiq	N/A	N/A	2/5
PlayStation Official Magazine – UK	N/A	7/10	N/A
Official Xbox Magazine (US)	N/A	N/A	6/10
PC Gamer (UK)	51%	N/A	N/A
Push Square	N/A	5/10	N/A
RPGamer	N/A	N/A	3.5/5
RPGFan	N/A	N/A	80%
411Mania	N/A	N/A	6/10
The Digital Fix	N/A	7/10	N/A

The game received "mixed" reviews on all platforms according to the review aggregation website Metacritic.

Several reviewers praised the game's colorful characters, humor and voice acting. Will Herring of GamePro commented in his review that The Baconing has "clever writing and great voice acting throughout". Eurogamer's Christian Donlan called the PS3 version's writing "witty stuff" and added that "the script can't wait to shoot off on strange tangents". Tom McShea of GameSpot also praised the Xbox 360 version's cast and called them both "oddball" and "amusing". Nicholas Tan of GameRevolution felt that the dialogue was over-the-top and enjoyable as well.

Critics were divided on the gameplay aspects of The Baconing. Tan noted that the combat system had been upgraded from the previous two titles, and that the addition of a shield bash mechanic helped when enemies crowded the player character. He also praised the new ability to choose between one of four characters for cooperative gameplay. Herring, however, felt the gameplay was repetitive and that the fetch quests did not feature enough variety. Though Donlan had some critical remarks in regards to gameplay he did note that the game is "a fiercely likeable time-waster." IGN's Kristine Steimer recommended that players consider playing DeathSpank: Thongs of Virtue first, as their opinion would be a good judge towards interest in The Baconing.

Edge gave the game seven out of ten, saying it was "undoubtedly a solid, entertaining addition to the series, but over-saturation has made this once brash and energetic adventure feel slightly predictable." GameZone gave the PlayStation 3 version 6.5 out of 10, saying that it was "proof positive that if you push a franchise too soon and too fast, signs of wear begin to set in. There are still moments of fun scattered in the game, but they're hidden beneath slightly worn out gameplay and limited options. Maybe Hothead ought to take some time off and wait a couple of years for the next DeathSpank game to make the rounds. Otherwise, he and his Thongs of Virtue will wear out their welcome."

Since its release, the Xbox 360 version sold 14,075 units by the end of 2011.
