= Dead Shot =

Dead-Shot, Dead Shot, Deadshot, Dead-Shots, Dead Shots, Deadshots or variant may refer to:

- Dead Shot (film)
- Deadshot, DC comics supervillain
- Charles "Dead Shot" Keen, a character from Billy's Boots
- Lawrence Dead-Shots, a unit of the Confederate Army, see List of Arkansas Civil War Confederate units
- Linden Dead-Shots, a unit of the Confederate Army, see 3rd Confederate Infantry Regiment
