= DeathSpank: Thongs of Virtue =

2010 video game

- Promotional artwork for DeathSpank: Thongs of Virtue
- Developer: Hothead Games
- Publisher: Electronic Arts
- Designer: Ron Gilbert
- Platforms: Mac OS X, Microsoft Windows, PlayStation 3, Xbox 360
- Release: PlayStation 3 September 21, 2010; Xbox 360; September 22, 2010; Microsoft Windows; November 30, 2010; Mac OS X December 14, 2010
- Genre: Action role-playing
- Modes: Single-player, multiplayer

DeathSpank: Thongs of Virtue is an action role-playing game by game designer Ron Gilbert and is the sequel to DeathSpank. It was announced on August 23, 2010. The game adds new environments, modernized weapons, increased boss fights, and a new multiplayer character. Thongs of Virtue was released on September 21, 2010 on the PlayStation 3 via the PlayStation Network and on September 22, 2010 on the Xbox 360 via Xbox Live Arcade. The Microsoft Windows and Mac OS X versions were released November 30, 2010 and December 14, 2010, respectively via Steam.

DeathSpank: Thongs of Virtue follows the titular character DeathSpank as he searches for the six mystical Thongs of Virtue. The game is the second of a two-part series, and the story begins immediately after the end of the first title. The first half of the series, entitled DeathSpank was first released on July 13, 2010. Gilbert described DeathSpank as being "Act I" in the story, and Thongs of Virtue as being "Acts II and III".

Critics received the game with generally positive reviews. Initial sales have been strong, with the Xbox 360 version selling nearly 32,000 units and the PlayStation 3 version nearly 39,000 units in 2010. Xbox Live Arcade sales exceeded 54,000 units in 2011. Critics enjoyed the continued humor, visual design and gameplay from the original game, however some critics felt that it was not different enough from the first game.

== Gameplay ==
Thongs of Virtue adds gameplay elements not present in DeathSpank, including firearms.

As with DeathSpank, the gameplay world of DeathSpank: Thongs of Virtue is cylinder-shaped and is rendered without load screens as the player explores its unique goings-on. Gameplay is similar to Diablo, featuring hundreds of pieces of armor and weapons. Advanced dialog options, similar to LucasArts' Monkey Island series, also play a large part in unfolding the game's story.

The game is being designed to be playable in short segments, and has three difficulty levels. It contains from 8 to 12 hours of gameplay depending on choices made during gameplay. In addition to the thirty-three main quests, players have the option of performing a total of 79 side quests. After defeating the final boss, the player can continue to play in the environment, with money in the form of green currency rather than gold coins. Thongs of Virtue includes modern and sci-fi elements, including ranged weapons such as automatic firearms. Extraterrestrial aliens are also introduced as a new enemy.

== Plot ==
DeathSpank: Thongs of Virtue continues where DeathSpank ended. The title character, DeathSpank, has collected The Artifact and now he searches for the six mystical Thongs of Virtue. As with the previous game, DeathSpank adventures with a companion. His cohort Steve is a ninja turned criminal; DeathSpank's companion from the first game, Sparkles the wizard, can also accompany DeathSpank in place of Steve. Together, they must find and destroy the six Thongs of Virtue to restore peace to the land.

== Development and marketing ==
DeathSpank: Thongs of Virtue was announced August 23, 2010, shortly after the release of its predecessor, DeathSpank. It was first released on September 21, 2010 on the PlayStation 3 via the PlayStation Network and then on September 22, 2010 on the Xbox 360 via Xbox Live Arcade. The Microsoft Windows and Mac OS X versions were released November 30, 2010 and December 14, 2010, respectively via Steam. According to Ron Gilbert, both parts of DeathSpank were developed at the same time, with his equal involvement in both of them. Originally it was meant to be released as one giant game, but it became too big for one downloadable game, so the developers split it into two. Gilbert has said that part two represents "Act II and III" of DeathSpank, and "wraps up the story nicely."

== Reception ==
DeathSpank

Aggregate scores
Aggregator	Score
GameRankings	78.50% (PC); 79.88% (PS3); 82.50% (X360)
Metacritic	78/100 (PC); 79/100 (PS3); 79/100 (X360)

Review scores
Publication	Score
1Up.com	B
Eurogamer	7/10
GameRevolution	B+
GamesRadar+	7/10
IGN	8.5/10

DeathSpank: Thongs of Virtue has received generally positive reviews from critics. At aggregate website GameRankings it holds scores of 78.50%, 79.88%, and 82.50% for the PlayStation 3, Microsoft Windows, and the Xbox 360, respectively. Fellow aggregate website Metacritic reports similar scores, with both the PlayStation 3 and Xbox 360 versions averaging 78/100 and the PC version also scoring 78/100. The game has sold over 25,000 units as of October 2010 on the Xbox 360, and nearly 32,000 as of end-of-year 2010. Xbox Live Arcade sales increased to over 54,000 units as of year-end 2011. The PlayStation 3 version sold a slightly higher number of copies with almost 39,000 units moved.

As with DeathSpank, critics cited elements The Secret of Monkey Island and Diablo in the game. Critics generally praised that the game stayed true to the original while adding some new gameplay mechanics and expanding the story. Taylor Cocke of 1UP.com stated "the return of DeathSpank yields an almost identical experience, in a really good way." Eurogamer's Kristan Reed agreed and noted that it is "a continuation of the same game. For those of you who loved part one, that can only be a good thing." In contrast, Game Revolution's Nick Tan noted that the only changes in the game were the weaponry, setting and dialogue, and added that it "copies much from the original."

The new gameplay mechanics received mixed opinions from reviewers. Daemon Hatfield of IGN praised the addition of new weaponry but noted that those who played the first game will need no introduction to Thongs of Virtue' gameplay, stating "It will feel very familiar to anyone who played the first DeathSpank, but it remains incredibly addictive." 1UP.com's Cocke felt that more could have been done to differentiate Thongs of Virtue from its predecessor. He commended Hothead Games for releasing the sequel so quickly, but felt "that [it] has obviously come at the expense of any big improvements over the first one."

DeathSpank: Thongs of Virtue's humor, visual design and voice acting generally received praise, with some exceptions. Kristan Reed of Eurogamer felt that "the poop gags [were] a little wearisome" but added "a sprinkling of the old Gilbert magic makes it a worthwhile ride." In comparison to DeathSpank, IGN's Hatfield felt that Thongs of Virtue was "addictive, just as pretty, and I dare say it's even a little funnier." Ryan Vincent from GameZone thought the game's new setting gave the game "far more charm and personality than the first DeathSpank."
