= The Purge: Election Year (soundtrack) =

The Purge: Election Year (Original Motion Picture Soundtrack)

Film score by Nathan Whitehead
- Released: July 1, 2016
- Recorded: 2016
- Genre: Film score
- Length: 68:47
- Label: Back Lot Music
- Producer: Nathan Whitehead

Nathan Whitehead chronology
Keanu (2016)	The Purge: Election Year (2016)	Beyond Skyline (2017)

The Purge: Election Year (Original Motion Picture Soundtrack) is the film score to the 2016 film The Purge: Election Year directed by James DeMonaco, which is the third instalment in The Purge franchise and the sequel to The Purge: Anarchy (2014). Nathan Whitehead composed the film score which was released through Back Lot Music on July 1, 2016.

== Development ==
Nathan Whitehead returned to score Election Year after previously scoring the predecessors. Election Year takes on a bigger canvas bringing the political subtext and Whitehead discussed that he juggled on multiple points of view making the musical tone much trickier, moving beyond surviving Purge night and examining societal issues and where Purge fits and the different motivations people have. According to Whitehead, for some people the Purge helps to improve the society, a right granted by the government with the other people oppose it, and some make money from the Purge. He also underlined the patriotic celebration and the grisly ritual, with the music having to weave through different points of view.

Whitehead had a restraint and precision for Leo which he tried to incorporate into the score and that highlighted a bit of his journey. As Leo is now working with the system of America, instead of grabbing quick vengeance, he decided to embrace democracy peacefully and become an agent for change. Leo's character had the measured toughness which he tried to reflect it in the score but also wanted it to be cool and genuine as well. The emotional component grew more significant and complex with each film, dwelling more into the mindset of the American people and the score needed to support that mindset as well. The action in Election Year, was fiercer and the score had to be "aggressive and hopefully communicate the nightmarish madness of the night" though refraining from hard rock or heavy metal. Whitehead refrained the use of an organ, an instrument which was not used in the previous instalments as per DeMonaco and Miller's suggestion due to the ceremonial and religious quality.

Whitehead considered finding the balance between writing a score working for both action and horror moments, was the hardest part as the film straddles all genres and had to struggle between finding the right balance. But he considered it fun working on it, and in the Election Year, he decided to go with unabashed action music at violent instances. The use of dark percussive sounds had been considered an integral part of the franchise's musical vocabulary that evokes the world building. DeMonaco gave numerous suggestions to Whitehead while also helping him tune into specific sounds, such as the submarine sonar which momentarily occurs, has been played using an SK-1 keyboard ran through various guitar pedals and plugins. Vocals were also considered an integral part in describing the nightmarish effect of the franchise and reflecting the dark recesses of society, he used vocals to reflect the societal nightmare.

Whitehead admitted on DeMonaco's imagination of how the world expands admitting to the similar collaborations in the past. He also said that DeMonaco provided him freedom to experiment on the sounds as the canvas expands and keeping it fresh by taking the story in new directions that calls for different musical approaches.

== Release ==
Back Lot Music released the soundtrack on July 1, 2016, in conjunction with the film's release.

== Track listing ==
No.	Title	Length
1.	"The Better Angels"	2:52
2.	"Protest"	1:22
3.	"Purge Games"	0:51
4.	"No One Is Exempt"	0:40
5.	"Hope"	1:36
6.	"Laney Rucker"	4:04
7.	"My Slice of the Pie"	3:09
8.	"Sirens"	3:07
9.	"Risk"	1:29
10.	"Gold Guns"	0:53
11.	"Candy Girl"	2:14
12.	"Photograph"	0:57
13.	"Radio Check"	5:23
14.	"We're on Our Own"	1:41
15.	"Murder Tourists"	4:21
16.	"Senator, Come with Us"	2:07
17.	"Pequeña Muerte"	5:06
18.	"Ground Unit"	2:58
19.	"The Tunnel"	3:38
20.	"The Sacrifice"	4:54
21.	"Deliver Us from Evil"	3:00
22.	"The Guest"	4:07
23.	"One More Move"	4:33
24.	"You Got This"	2:01
25.	"Landslide"	1:44
Total length:		68:47

== Reception ==
Simon Abrams of RogerEbert.com noted Whitehead's music as "klaxon-like" reminiscent of Hans Zimmer's "braaahm-intensive score" from Inception (2010). Owen Gleiberman of Variety and Justin Lowe of The Hollywood Reporter called it "bombastic" and "intensive". Filmtracks-based reviewer called the score being "ineffective and functional".

== Personnel ==
Credits adapted from liner notes:

- Music composer and producer: Nathan Whitehead
- Score recording: Daniel Kresco
- Score mixing: Daniel Kresco, Phil McGowan
- Music editor: Dan Evans Farkas
- Orchestrator and conductor: Peter Bateman
- Additional arrangements: Erik Lutz
- Score technical assistant: Seth Johnson

== Chart performance ==
Chart performance for The Purge: Election Year (Original Motion Picture Soundtrack)
Chart (2016)	Peak position
UK Soundtrack Albums (OCC)	50
US Soundtrack Albums (Billboard)	24

== Accolades ==
Awards	Category	Recipient(s) and nominee(s)	Result	Ref.
International Film Music Critics Association	Best Original Score for a Fantasy/Science Fiction/Horror Film	Nathan Whitehead	Nominated	
