= The Purge (2013 film) =

2013 film by James DeMonaco

- Theatrical release poster
- Directed by: James DeMonaco
- Written by: James DeMonaco
- Produced by: Jason Blum; Sébastien K. Lemercier; Michael Bay; Andrew Form; Brad Fuller
- Starring: Ethan Hawke; Lena Headey; Adelaide Kane; Max Burkholder
- Cinematography: Jacques Jouffret
- Edited by: Peter Gvozdas
- Music by: Nathan Whitehead
- Production companies: Blumhouse Productions; Platinum Dunes; Why Not Productions
- Distributed by: Universal Pictures
- Release dates: May 2, 2013 (Stanley Film Festival); June 7, 2013 (United States)
- Running time: 85 minutes
- Country: United States
- Language: English
- Budget: $3 million
- Box office: $91.3 million

The Purge is a 2013 American action horror film written and directed by James DeMonaco. It is the first installment in the Purge franchise.

Set in the year 2022, the film stars Ethan Hawke, Lena Headey, Adelaide Kane, and Max Burkholder as members of a wealthy family who find themselves endangered by a gang of murderers during the annual Purge, a night during which all crime, including murder, is temporarily legal.

The film premiered at the Stanley Film Festival on May 2, 2013, and released in theaters on June 7, 2013, in the United States.

The Purge was released on DVD and Blu-ray Disc on October 8, 2013. A 4K UHD Blu-ray release occurred on June 12, 2018.

== Plot ==
In 2014, following an economic collapse in the United States, a political party called the "New Founding Fathers of America" is voted into office. It creates an annual 12-hour "Purge," during which all crime using a "Class 4" weapon or lower is legal, and emergency services are unavailable on March 22 from 7:00 p.m. to 7:00 a.m. the next morning. By 2022, the economy is booming, with unemployment at 1% and crime at an all-time low. Many commentators attribute these successes to the Purge, though some note that it mostly affects the poor and marginalized.

In 2022, security systems salesman James Sandin returns to his home in an affluent L.A. gated community to wait out the Purge with his wife, Mary, and their two children, 15-year-old Zoe and 11-year-old Charlie. During a family dinner, James announces that he is now the top salesman in his company. He assures them that his company's upgraded security system, which he has also sold to multiple neighbors, will protect them during the Purge. As an extra precaution, James retrieves a pistol from a gun safe. Charlie objects to the impending violence of the Purge, but James explains that it has rid the country of poverty and crime by giving people an outlet for their pent-up anger. Shortly before the Purge begins, James enables the security system, which seals the doors and windows with metal plating. Returning to her room, Zoe is surprised by her older boyfriend, Henry, who snuck inside before James activated the security system. Henry tells Zoe that he has come to confront her father over his disapproval of their relationship.

On the security monitors, Charlie sees a wounded stranger outside their home, desperately calling for help. He disables the security system to allow the man inside, but James re-engages the system and holds the man at gunpoint. Henry comes downstairs with a pistol and tries to shoot James, but James returns fire and mortally wounds Henry, who later dies on Zoe's bedroom floor. During the chaos, the stranger disappears.

On the surveillance cameras, the family sees a gang of masked, armed young adults arriving on the front lawn. The gang leader addresses the Sandins through their front-door camera, demanding that they turn over the stranger, whom they wish to execute during the Purge. He threatens to kill the family if they refuse. James admits that the security system, while superficially impressive, cannot resist a systematic assault. The Sandins capture the stranger to hand him over, but decide to defend him and themselves instead. After the gang breaks in, James kills several members but is stabbed by the leader.

The Sandins' neighbors intervene, killing the gang members and rescuing Mary, whom two Purgers have restrained. Zoe kills the gang leader, while James dies from his wounds. Mary begins to thank the neighbors for saving them, but their leader, Grace Ferrin, reveals that the neighbors hate the Sandins, believing they have become wealthy at their expense. The neighbors capture the Sandins and prepare to kill them since James (their original target) is already dead, but the stranger returns, kills a neighbor, and holds Grace hostage to force the Sandins' release. Mary stops him from killing the others, avoiding more violence, and decides to wait peacefully for the Purge to end, even refusing the neighbors' demands to be killed. The next morning, Grace tries to take control, but Mary breaks her nose with a shotgun butt and slams her face into a table, telling her again that there will be no more killing. As sirens sound at 7:00 a.m. to signal the end of the Purge, Mary forces her former friends to leave in defeat and thanks the stranger for his help.

Television news reports the most successful Purge ever. Other reports say the stock market is booming due to weapons and security sales. A man's voice describes losing his patriotism after his sons' death the previous night.

== Cast ==
=== The Sandin family ===
- Ethan Hawke as James Sandin
- Lena Headey as Mary Sandin
- Max Burkholder as Charlie Sandin
- Adelaide Kane as Zoe Sandin

=== The Neighbors ===
- Arija Bareikis as Grace Ferrin
- Tom Yi as Mr. Cali
- Chris Mulkey as Mr. Halverson
- Tisha French as Mrs. Halverson
- Dana Bunch as Mr. Ferrin

=== The Purgers ===
- Rhys Wakefield as Polite Leader
- John Weselcouch as Interrupting Freak Purger
- Alicia Vela-Bailey as Blonde Female Freak Purger
- Mickey Facchinello as Brunette Freak Purger
- Boima Blake as Freak Purger
- Nathan Clarkson as Freak Purger
- Jesse Jacobs as Freak Purger
- Aaron Kuban as Freak Purger
- Chester Lockhart as Freak Purger
- Tyler Osterkamp as Freak Purger
- R. J. Wolfe as Freak Purger

=== Other characters ===
- Edwin Hodge as Bloody Stranger (Note: The character's real name was revealed as "Dante Bishop" in The Purge: Election Year.)
- Tony Oller as Henry
- Peter Bzovdas as Dr. Peter Buynak
- Karen Strassman as Newscaster
- Cindy Robinson as the Purge Emergency Broadcast System announcement voice (uncredited) (Note: The character's real name was revealed as "Megan Lewis" in The Purge television series.)

== Production ==
DeMonaco was partially inspired to write the script based on a comment from his wife following a road rage incident. Both DeMonaco and Lemercier recalled initially experiencing negative feedback while seeking funding for their script, being told it was "too un-American" due to its themes of violence and gun control. Jason Blum, representing Universal, tasked with developing low-cost genre films to the studio, provided DeMonaco and Lemercier with $3 million in funding to produce the film.

The film was shot in Los Angeles. The relatively low budget of the film resulted in setting the film almost entirely within the house. Hawke slept on Blum's couch during the course of filming and agreed to $10,000 up front for his involvement. Following the film's success, Hawke later made $2 million in backend compensation.

DeMonaco and Lemercier were initially unsure if the film would ultimately be released, given mediocre screen testing, though DeMonaco also noted that Black and Latino test audiences responded positively to the film, which he credited to the film's themes. DeMonaco also encountered testing response cards from viewers who expressed approval for the purge concept, which he found disturbing and antithetical to the film's message.

== Reception ==
=== Box office & Home Video ===
In its opening weekend, The Purge topped the box office with $16.8 million on opening day and $34.1 million through the entire weekend. The film earned $64.5 million domestically and $24.9 million outside the United States, for a total of $91.3 million worldwide, with a production budget of $3 million.

It went on to gross $13 million in home video sales.

=== Critical response ===
Rotten Tomatoes reports an approval rating of 41% based on 157 reviews and a weighted average of 5.20/10. The site's critics consensus reads, "Half social allegory, half home-invasion thriller, The Purge attempts to make an intelligent point, but ultimately devolves into numbing violence and tired clichés." The film holds a score of 41 out of 100 on Metacritic, based on 33 critics, signifying "mixed or average reviews". Audiences polled by CinemaScore gave the film an average grade of "C" on an A+ to F scale.

On io9, Charlie Jane Anders described it as "a clunky and implausible political screed in movie form". Entertainment Weekly gave The Purge a B−, saying that it "clearly has a lot on its mind, but it never really manages to express it".

In the Tri-City Herald, Gary Wolcott described the movie as "[A]lmost the dumbest movie in history. My recommendation is purge The Purge from your weekend movie plans."

== Sequels and prequel ==
Due to the success of the first film, a sequel, The Purge: Anarchy, was developed by Universal and Blumhouse. It was released worldwide on July 18, 2014 and is set in 2023, a year after the first film. Edwin Hodge (The Stranger), Tyler Osterkamp (The Freak), and Nathan Clarkson (The Purger) were the only cast members to reprise their role, while only Hodge was credited.

A third film, The Purge: Election Year, was released on July 1, 2016. A fourth film, The First Purge, which is set as a prequel in the franchise, was released on July 4, 2018. Ethan Hawke reprises his role as James Sandin in the opening scene of "7:01am", the series finale of The Purge television series. A fifth film, The Forever Purge, was released on July 2, 2021.

Despite the fifth film being presented as the final film, plans emerged for a sixth film that would focus on Frank Grillo's character Leo Barnes. In July 2021, these plans were scrapped.

In July 2025, in an interview with Bloody Disgusting, DeMonaco confirmed the completion of a script for a sixth film, indicating that film could begin as early as late 2025.

== See also ==
- The Purge Original Soundtrack
- The Lottery
- List of films featuring home invasions
- Social cleansing, relevant sociological concept
