= The Purge: Anarchy (soundtrack) =

The Purge: Anarchy (Original Motion Picture Soundtrack)

Film score by Nathan Whitehead
- Released: July 15, 2014
- Recorded: 2014
- Genre: Film score
- Length: 62:01
- Label: Back Lot Music
- Producer: Nathan Whitehead

Nathan Whitehead chronology
The Last Ship (2014)	The Purge: Anarchy (2014)	The Remaining (2014)

The Purge: Anarchy (Original Motion Picture Soundtrack) is the film score to the 2014 film The Purge: Anarchy, directed by James DeMonaco which is the second instalment in The Purge franchise and a sequel to The Purge (2013). Nathan Whitehead composed the film score, which released under the Back Lot Music label on July 15, 2014.

== Development ==
Nathan Whitehead, who previously scored The Purge (2013) returned to compose for Anarchy. Unlike the first film, the sequel expands and takes place over the city of Los Angeles. Whitehead discussed with DeMonaco about the madness of the night and how the music would speak. He noted that the city of Los Angeles and its grit, beauty and sprawl provided him the inspiration for Anarchy. He noted about the aerial shots of the city with the skyline and sea of lights that feels big and expansive, and it zooms into the bowels of the city which was dark, and the urban sounds and textures come to its closure. This provided an inspiration to create a score that felt larger in scope and diving into the intense, violent situations that unfolded throughout the city.

Keeping the genre in mind, Whitehead steered clear from music which were traditionally action or traditionally horror and focused on sounds and textures as well as paying attention to the emotional content. The film had melodic motifs but finding sounds or textures which was intangible as with the predecessor, was a big part of writing this score. Hence, he tried to focus more on creating the unique vocabulary that works in all genres but still deliver the adequate pacing, tension and emotion. He considered it to be tricky, as he could not reach for some of his usual tools or techniques, but found it fun creating the textural and electronic elements.

== Release ==
Back Lot Music released the soundtrack on July 15, 2014.

== Track listing ==
No.	Title	Length
1.	"Don't Do This"	2:34
2.	"Pictures"	0:52
3.	"Unlock the Car"	1:29
4.	"Did You Get the Raise?"	0:35
5.	"Driving"	2:56
6.	"Commencement"	2:56
7.	"Foot Trap"	1:20
8.	"Diego"	4:36
9.	"Two for Big Daddy"	6:01
10.	"I'm Doing God's Work"	1:42
11.	"I'll Be a Martyr"	2:19
12.	"New Rule"	1:48
13.	"He Stole Our Pensions, Now He's Gone"	4:13
14.	"Subway"	2:54
15.	"Running"	2:00
16.	"Money"	6:21
17.	"Hunting Grounds"	4:34
18.	"I'm Sorry"	3:18
19.	"This Is Our Time Now"	1:06
20.	"Better Citizens"	2:31
21.	"A Nation Reborn"	3:17
22.	"Please, Let Us Take Care of You"	2:39
Total length:		62:01

== Reception ==
Nick Hasted of The Arts Desk wrote "Nathan Whitehead's pulsing synth score carry echoes of Carpenter's Assault on Precinct 13 and Escape from New York." Tim Grierson of Screen International called it "highly intriguing". Betsy Sharkey of Los Angeles Times found the score to be "thrilling". The Hollywood Reporter-based critics noted "Effectively adding to the tense atmosphere is Nathan Whitehead's excellent electronic music score." Critic Joe Baker added "Nathan Whitehead’s original score is similar to that of the first film, only this time being much shorter in length, mostly consisting of a series of tracks that lack anything overly distinctive about them, being utilised within the film exclusively to help build tension. That is with the exception of the track: ‘Commencement,’ however, without a doubt the best track of the entire score, as this impactful and brooding track plays when ‘The Purge’ first begins, making for one of the film’s most memorable scenes."

== Accolades ==
Awards	Category	Recipient(s) and nominee(s)	Result	Ref.
ASCAP Film and Television Music Awards	Top Box Office Films	Nathan Whitehead	Won	
