= Cindy Robinson =

American voice actress (born 1969)

- Born: April 6, 1969 (age 57)
- Occupation: Voice actress
- Years active: 1987–present
- Spouse: Christopher Corey Smith (m. 2022)

Cindy Robinson (born April 6, 1969) is an American voice actress who voices in animations and video games. Some of her major roles are Makoto Nanaya and Gii from the BlazBlue series, Betty Boop in commercials, Queen Beryl in Sailor Moon, Chitose Nanbu in Ah My Buddha, Kukaku Shiba, Miyako Shiba, Jinta Hanakari (kid) and Kiyone Kotetsu in Bleach, Zola in the Blue Dragon series, Minerva, Libra, and Hinoka in the Fire Emblem franchise, Madeline Hatter in Ever After High, Astrid in Skyrim, and Zafina in the Tekken series. She also makes an uncredited appearance as the voice of the Purge Emergency Broadcast System in The Purge franchise.

Robinson is best known for her role as Amy Rose in the Sonic the Hedgehog franchise since 2010.

== Personal life ==
On April 29, 2022, Robinson married fellow voice actor Christopher Corey Smith.

== Filmography ==
=== Anime ===
List of dubbing voice performances in anime
Year	Title	Role	Notes	Source
2002	GTO	Nanako Mizuki, Juria Murai, Fuyumi Kujirakawa, Saeko Iijima, others		
2003	Reign: The Conqueror	Roxanne		
2003	Brigadoon	Various characters		
2003	Cyborg 009	Lena	2001 series, Point 360 dub	
2004	Duel Masters	Sharlotte Kirifuda		
2004	Rave Master	Katelya Glory		
2004	Urda: The Third Reich	Erna	OVA series	
2004	Cybuster	Lyune Frank		
2004	Yukikaze	Additional voices	OVA	
2004–05	Marmalade Boy	Chiyako Matsuura, others		
2004–05	Ghost in the Shell: Stand Alone Complex	Zaitsev's wife, Female hostage	Also 2nd Gig	
2005	Grenadier	Touka Kurenai; Teppa's Companion		
2005	Naruto	Tsunami, Kotohime, Kujaku, Naruto's Sexy Jutsu, Samui		
2005	Eiken	Kirika Misono	OVA	
2006	Phantom the Animation	Claudia McCunnen		
2006	Prince of Tennis	Sakuno Ryuzaki		
2006	Bleach	Kukaku Shiba, Kiyone Kotetsu, Jinta Hanakari, Miyako Shiba		
2006	Green Green	Midori Chitose		
2006	Saiyuki Reload Gunlock	Lirin; Kougyoku; Hakkai's Piece		
2007	Noein	Kosagi, Ryouko Uchida, Yukie Nijo		
2007	Flag	Cmdr. Chris Eversalt		
2007	Ghost Slayers Ayashi	Sote Matsue		
2008	Blue Dragon	Zola		
2008	Buso Renkin	Oka Hayasaka		
2008	Kyo Kara Maoh!	Flynn, Young Josak		
2008	Moribito: Guardian of the Spirit	Balsa		
2008	Tweeny Witches	Sheila		
2008–09	Code Geass	Inoue, V.V.		
2009	Ah My Buddha	Chitose Nanbu		
2009	Nodame Cantabile	Saiko Tagaya, Yuki Inoue		
2009	Naruto Shippuden	Kamui, Sarui (ep 156)		
2010–14	Mobile Suit Gundam Unicorn	Liam Borrinea		
2010	Slayers Revolution and Evolution-R	Kuppi		
2010	Kekkaishi	Young Yoshimori, Gatcho, Honetaro		
2011	Marvel Anime: Iron Man	Pepper Potts, Sho (Young)		
2013–15	Digimon Fusion	Laylamon, Chibikamemon, Lunamon, others		
2014–15	Sailor Moon	Queen Beryl, Berthier	Viz dub	
2015	BlazBlue Alter Memory	Makoto Nanaya, Gii		
2016-present	Bungo Stray Dogs	Ozaki Kouyou		
2017	The Testament of Sister New Devil	Kurumi Nonaka		
2017	Hunter × Hunter	Chimera Ant Queen	2011 series	
2018	Devilman Crybaby	Silene, Psycho Jenny	Netflix dub	
2020	BNA: Brand New Animal	Barbaray Rose	Netflix dub	
2022–23	Bleach: Thousand-Year Blood War	Kukaku Shiba, Kiyone Kotetsu		

=== Animation ===
List of voice performances in animation
Year	Title	Role	Notes	Source
2000–2011	LeapFrog Series	Leap, Dan, Della, Tim		
2003	Tutenstein	Sakt		
2007	Shaggy & Scooby-Doo Get a Clue!	Nifties	Episode: "Inside Job"	
2009	Olivia	Queen		
2009	Superman: Red Son	Lois Lane, Brainiac	Motion comic	
2010–2017	Monster High	Jackson Jekyll / Holt Hyde, Operetta, Madame Ghostier	Webisodes and TV specials	
2010	The Avengers: Earth's Mightiest Heroes	Ravonna		
2011–2013	Speed Racer: The Next Generation	Shadowy Woman, Trixie Tradewell	For Season 2.	
2012	Huntik: Secrets and Seekers	Billie, Lin Storm		
2013–2016	Ever After High	Madeline Hatter, Ramona Badwolf	Web series and specials	
2014–2017	Sonic Boom	Amy Rose, Elderly Gogoba, additional voices	Writer, Episode: "Give Bees a Chance"	
2015	Star vs. the Forces of Evil	Additional voices	Episode: "St. Olga's Reform School for Wayward Princesses"	
2016	The Powerpuff Girls	Additional voices	Episode: "The Wrinklegruff Gals"	
2018–2019	Subway Surfers: The Animated Series	Yutani		
2019–present	Enchantimals	Sela Sloot, Tamika Tree frog	Welcome to Junglewood	
2021	High Guardian Spice	Flora, Zinnia		

=== Films ===
List of voice performances in theatrical films
Year	Title	Role	Notes	Source
2013	The Purge	Megan Lewis (Purge Emergency Broadcast System)	Uncredited	
2014	The Purge: Anarchy	Megan Lewis (Purge Emergency Broadcast System)	Uncredited	
2016	The Purge: Election Year	Megan Lewis (Purge Emergency Broadcast System)	Uncredited	
2018	The First Purge	Megan Lewis (Purge Emergency Broadcast System)	Uncredited	
2018	Big Fish & Begonia	Shu Pozi/Pei	Voice	
2019	Penguin Highway	Aoyoma's mother	Voice	
2020	Anemone: Eureka Seven Hi-Evolution	Haruka	Voice	
2021	Moonbound	Nightfairy	Voice	
2021	The Forever Purge	Megan Lewis (Purge Emergency Broadcast System)	Uncredited	
2024	My Oni Girl	Shimako Yamashita	Voice	

List of voice performances in direct-to-video and television films
Year	Title	Role	Notes	Source
2004	The Nutcracker and the Mouse King	Mother		
2005	Appleseed	Nike	Animaze dub	
2006	The Happy Cricket	Honeydew		
2007	Paprika	Dr. Atsuko Chiba, Paprika		
2007	Naruto the Movie: Ninja Clash in the Land of Snow	Fubuki Kakuyoku		
2008	The Blue Elephant	Matriarch Elephant, Dela		
2008	Resident Evil: Degeneration	Various characters		
2008	The Sky Crawlers	Towa Sasakura		
2008	Naruto the Movie 3: Guardians of the Crescent Moon Kingdom	Karenbana		
2009	Happily N'Ever After 2	Lady Vain		
2009	A Martian Christmas	Kip, Mary Kate		
2010	I Want Your Money	Hillary Clinton and Nancy Pelosi (voices)		
2012	Winx Club: The Secret of the Lost Kingdom	Bloom		
2012	Monster High: Ghouls Rule	Jackson Jekyll / Holt Hyde, Operetta, Officer Murphy, Normie Reporter, Hall of Halloween Skeleton		
2013	Winx Club 3D: Magical Adventure	Bloom		
2013	Monster High: 13 Wishes	Gory Fangtel, Operetta, Jackson Jekyll		
2013	The Snow Queen	Snow Queen, Robber Hag		
2014	Monster High: Frights, Camera, Action!	Gory Fangtel, Operetta, Sofeara Gorepola, Maid #1, Vampire Dignitary #2		
2014	Monster High: Freaky Fusion	Operetta, Jackson Jekyll		
2014	Alpha and Omega 4: The Legend of the Saw Tooth Cave	Eve		
2014	Winx Club: The Mystery of the Abyss	Bloom	English version	
2015	Monster High: Haunted	Operetta		
2017	Birdboy: The Forgotten Children	Zacharias's Mother, Spider		

=== Television ===
List of voice performances and actual appearance in television series
Year	Title	Role	Notes	Source
2018–19	The Purge	Megan Lewis (Purge Emergency Broadcast System) (Remembrance Day Commentary)	Uncredited Role. Episodes: "What is America?", "A Nation Reborn", "Grief Box", "Before the Sirens"; Credited Role. Episode: "This Is Not a Test"	VO

=== Dubbing of foreign shows in English ===
List of English-language dubbings of foreign language shows
Year	Title	Country	Dubbed from	Role	Live Actor	Source
2016	The Break	Belgium	French	Brigitte Fischer	Catherine Salée	
2021	Intertwined	Argentina	Spanish	Amelia "Cocó" Sharp	Elena Roger	

=== Video games ===
List of voice performances in video games
Year	Title	Role	Notes	Source
2002	Ratchet & Clank (2002)	Computer		
2004	World of Warcraft	Blood Elf		
2005	Guild Wars 2	Multiple voices		
2006	Dungeons and Dragons Online	Dungeon Master, Kobold		
2006	Pimp My Ride	Additional Voices		
2007	Earth Defense Force 2017	News Reporter		
2007	Blue Dragon	Zola		
2007	Eternal Sonata	Solfege		
2007	Clive Barker's Jericho	Abigail Black		
2007–present	Tekken series	Zafina		
2008	Bleach: Dark Souls	Kūkaku Shiba		
2008	Naruto: Clash of Ninja Revolution 2	Kagura		
2008	Star Ocean: First Departure	Yvena		
2008	Valkyria Chronicles	Marina Wulfstan		
2009–present	BlazBlue series	Makoto Nanaya, Gii		
2009	Infamous	Additional voices		
2009	Colin McRae: Dirt 2	Katie Justice		
2009	Bleach: The 3rd Phantom	Konoka Suzunami, Kukaku Shiba		
2009	Naruto Shippuden: Clash of Ninja Revolution 3	Kagura		
2010	Vandal Hearts: Flames of Judgment	Calvin Atrias, Shance Aya		
2010	Mass Effect 2	Detective Anaya, Jentha, Female Plague Guard, Diana		
2010	BioShock 2	Additional voices		
2010	Final Fantasy XIII	Cocoon Inhabitants, additional voices		
2010	Fallout: New Vegas	Dr. Howard, The Kid, Trooper Gleason, Corporal Betsy		
2010	Sonic Colors	Amy Rose	DS version	
2011	Ratchet & Clank: All 4 One	The Steward, Janice	Uncredited	
2011	Sonic Generations	Amy Rose		
2011	The Elder Scrolls V: Skyrim	Astrid		
2011	Mario & Sonic at the London 2012 Olympic Games	Amy Rose		
2012	Persona 4 Arena	Labrys		
2012	The Elder Scrolls V: Dawnguard	Valerica		
2012	Resident Evil 6	Civilians		
2012	Sonic & All-Stars Racing Transformed	Amy Rose		
2013	Fire Emblem Awakening	Aversa, Libra		
2013	Final Fantasy XIV: A Realm Reborn	Kan-E-Senna		
2013	Armored Core: Verdict Day	Magnolia Curtis, CPU Voice		
2013	Sonic Lost World	Amy Rose		
2013	Mario & Sonic at the Sochi 2014 Olympic Winter Games	Amy Rose		
2014	Persona Q: Shadow of the Labyrinth	Ken Amada		
2015	Fallout 4	Gwen McNamara, Becky Fallon, Avery		
2015	Xenoblade Chronicles X	Ga Buidhe		
2015/2016	Lego Dimensions	Amy Rose	Sonic the Hedgehog Pack	
2016	Street Fighter V	Helen/Kolin		
2016	Mario & Sonic at the Rio 2016 Olympic Games	Amy Rose		
2016	Lego Star Wars: The Force Awakens	Additional Voices		
2017	Fire Emblem Heroes	Minerva, Hinoka, Peri, Libra		
2017	Mass Effect: Andromeda	Paraan Shie, Captain Dunn		
2017	Club Penguin Island	Aunt Arctic		
2017	Super Smash Heroes	Kouko Morisawa, First Aid		
2017	Sonic Forces	Amy Rose, Additional Voices		
2018	Octopath Traveler	H'aanit		
2018	BlazBlue: Cross Tag Battle	Makoto Nanaya, Labrys		
2019	Metro Exodus	Giul		
2019	Sekiro: Shadows Die Twice	Lady Butterfly		
2019	Team Sonic Racing	Amy Rose		
2020	Sakuna: Of Rice and Ruin	Kamuhitsuki		
2022	Relayer	Additional voices		
2023	The Legend of Heroes: Trails into Reverie	Doctor Seiland, citizens		
2023	Rune Factory 3 Special	Raven		
2024	Like a Dragon: Infinite Wealth	Additional voices		
2024	Persona 3 Reload	Additional voices		
2024	Puyo Puyo Puzzle Pop	Yu, Rei		
2024	Helldivers 2	Coretta Kelly		
2026	Trails in the Sky 2nd Chapter	Alicia von Auslese		

=== Theatre ===
List of theatrical performances
Year	Title	Role	Notes	Sources
1987–89	Into the Woods	Snow White Cinderella, Little Red Ridinghood, Rapunzel (Understudy)	Broadway	
1990–91	Peter Pan	Wendy Darling/Jane Peter Pan (Understudy)	Broadway	
1994	Carousel	Hannah Bentley/Snow Child Julie Jordan (Understudy)	Broadway	
2007	Chess	Florence Vassy	Concert	
