= The First Purge =

2018 film by Gerard McMurray

- Theatrical release poster
- Directed by: Gerard McMurray
- Written by: James DeMonaco
- Produced by: Jason Blum; Michael Bay; Andrew Form; Brad Fuller; Sébastien K. Lemercier
- Starring: Y'lan Noel; Lex Scott Davis; Joivan Wade; Steve Harris
- Cinematography: Anastas Michos
- Edited by: Jim Page
- Music by: Kevin Lax
- Production companies: Universal Pictures; Perfect World Pictures; Platinum Dunes; Blumhouse Productions; Man in a Tree Productions
- Distributed by: Universal Pictures
- Release date: July 4, 2018
- Running time: 97 minutes
- Country: United States
- Language: English
- Budget: $13 million
- Box office: $137.1 million

The First Purge is a 2018 American dystopian action horror film serving as a prequel to The Purge film series and the fourth installment overall. Written by James DeMonaco and directed by Gerard McMurray, it is the first film in the franchise not directed by DeMonaco. It stars Y'lan Noel, Lex Scott Davis, Joivan Wade, and Steve Harris.

The film depicts the origins of the annual "Purge": a 12-hour period in which all crime in America is decriminalized as a means to reduce crime for the rest of the year. The event originates as an experiment conceived by a political party called the New Founding Fathers of America and confined to Staten Island with the promise that those who stay on the island for its duration will be paid a large sum of money, but the NFFA are determined to get the results they want by any means necessary.

The First Purge was released on July 4, 2018, by Universal Pictures. It grossed over $137 million worldwide, becoming the highest-grossing entry in the franchise, but received mixed reviews from critics like its predecessors. The fifth installment, The Forever Purge, was released on July 2, 2021.

== Plot ==
In 2014, rising unemployment, rising inflation, and a housing crisis led to the New Founding Fathers of America (NFFA) becoming the most powerful political party in the United States, with NFFA candidate Bracken being elected president in 2016. Later that year, NFFA chief of staff Arlo Sabian and sociologist Dr. May Updale announce an experiment to take place on Staten Island: for 12 hours, citizens will be allowed to release their inhibitions in any way they choose, including murder. Meanwhile, crazed drug addict Skeletor talks about his desires to "purge" and unleash his hatred of others with an NFFA employee. The NFFA offers residents $5,000 to stay on Staten Island during the experiment, with additional compensation if they join the Purge and survive. They also outfit the participants with contact lens cameras to monitor all activity and put tracking devices in them to know if they try to leave the island.

Low-lying gang boss and businessman Dmitri Cimber tells his associates that they will not be leaving the island, as moving his money and product will draw too much attention, and tells them to stay in a safe house and lay low. Drug dealer Capital A disobeys and joins the Purge, while a rookie named Isaiah is attacked and injured by Skeletor. Isaiah goes to his sister Nya, an anti-Purge activist and Dmitri's ex-girlfriend, for treatment. As people flee Staten Island, Nya joins her friends Dolores, Luisa, and Selina in a church to wait out the Purge. Dmitri has stayed behind; Anna and Elsa, two prostitutes, are sent by his dealers to his office to keep him company. Skeletor commits the first Purge murder, and the video recorded by the NFFA goes viral. The NFFA observes that all crimes taking place are minor, unlike the expected violent ones like murder.

Isaiah secretly joins the Purge to get his revenge on Skeletor. When Skeletor disrupts a party taking place and Isaiah is unable to muster the courage to kill him, he runs off into more Purgers before hiding and calling Nya for help. Anna and Elsa, who are actually Purgers, attempt to kill Dmitri, who fights them off and learns that Capital A sent them so he could take over Dmitri's business. Skeletor captures Nya in the streets, but Isaiah stabs him, and they escape. Capital A and his crew go to Dmitri's office to meet with Anna and Elsa. However, Dmitri and his gang ambush him and kill them all, except for Anna and Elsa, whom they tell to leave. Nya and Isaiah return to the church to see blood-soaked white supremacist bikers leaving while Nya's friend, Luisa, and her daughter, Selina, survive. They all return to Nya's apartment, where Dolores makes it safely.

At the NFFA headquarters, Updale becomes suspicious of an increase in murder and masked participants' presence. Reviewing the video footage of the Purge, she notices vans full of masked killers arriving and realizes that they are mercenary groups killing civilians. Sabian sent the mercenaries to make the experiment look successful and eventually to help balance the wealth disequilibrium between the rich and the poor. Updale protests this tampering, realizing that the NFFA only wants to eradicate the poor to save the expense of social programs. With his corruption exposed, Sabian has Updale taken to Staten Island where she is executed, and then orders to have all footage of this erased.

Dmitri and his gang escape through the streets until unknown assailants attack them. The gang disposes of them all and discovers they are mercenaries. Realizing they were sent by the NFFA, who had also planted weapons in the area to provoke participation, Dmitri and his crew decide to take a stand against them and protect the neighborhood. After saving local shop owner Freddy and his associates, they go to Nya's apartment building to try and save her and her friends, but NFFA drones shoot and kill most of Dmitri's gang. Dmitri calls Nya and warns her of the mercenaries' invasion. Dmitri later kills several mercenaries and helps Nya's group to hide in a safe space. More mercenaries are about to shoot a rocket-propelled grenade into the apartments when a deranged Skeletor arrives and eliminates some mercenaries before being killed. Dmitri grabs a piece of plastic explosive and gives it to Nya to throw it while he shoots it until it explodes, killing the remaining mercenaries. As sirens sound at the end of the Purge, a wounded Dmitri is hailed as a hero and states that the survivors must fight back.

Sabian later calls this experimental Purge a success and announces that a nationwide Purge may begin as soon as the following year.

== Cast ==
- Y'lan Noel as Dmitri Cimber, a businessman and a gang kingpin
- Lex Scott Davis as Nya Charms, an anti-Purge activist
- Joivan Wade as Isaiah Charms, Nya's younger brother
- Mugga as Dolores, a friend of Nya
- Patch Darragh as Arlo Sabian/Chief of Staff, the Chief of Staff of the NFFA
- Marisa Tomei as Dr. May Updale/The Architect, the NFFA's sociologist and architect
- Luna Lauren Vélez as Luisa, mother of Selina
- Kristen Solis as Selina, a friend of Nya
- Rotimi Paul as Skeletor, an insane drug addicted serial killer who goes out on Purge night to unleash his anger on other people
- Mo McRae as 7 & 7, a gang member of Dmitri
- Jermel Howard as Lorenzo, one of the gang members of Dmitri
- Siya as Blaise, a gang member of Dmitri
- Christian Robinson as Capital A, one of the gang members turned traitor
- Steve Harris as Freddy, member of the Three Wise Men of Staten Island
- Derek Basco as Taz, Freddy's best friend and one of the Three Wise Men
- DK Bowser as Sharpie, member of the Three Wise Men
- Mitchell Edwards as Kels, a member of Dmitri's gang and Isaiah's friend
- Maria Rivera as Anna, a call girl hired by Capital A to seduce and assassinate Dmitri
- Chyna Layne as Elsa, a second call girl hired by Capital A to seduce and assassinate Dmitri
- Ian Blackman as NFFA President Bracken, the newly sworn in President of the NFFA
- Melonie Diaz as Juani, a Purge prospect
- Naszir Nance as Terence, a member of Dmitri's gang
- Peter Johnson as Pastor Carl Almory, a church leader
- Levy Tran as Roenick, worker for the NFFA
- Kevin Carrigan as General Smiley, the leader and general of a NFFA Paramilitary force dispatched to kill the poor
- Desiigner as a member of Kels' crew
- Qurrat Ann Kadwani as news reporter #3
- Cindy Robinson as the Purge Emergency Broadcast System announcement voice (uncredited) (Note: The character's real name was revealed as "Megan Lewis" in The Purge television series.)

== Production ==
In September 2016, James DeMonaco, the creator of the franchise, said that the fourth film, a follow-up to 2016's The Purge: Election Year, would be a prequel to the trilogy, showing how the United States came to the point of accepting the Purge Night. On February 17, 2017, DeMonaco announced that the fourth installment in The Purge franchise was in development at Universal Pictures. DeMonaco did not return as director, but wrote the script and produced the film, with Jason Blum of Blumhouse Productions, Michael Bay, Andrew Form, and Brad Fuller of Platinum Dunes, and Sébastien K. Lemercier. In July 2017, Gerard McMurray, the director of Sundance film Burning Sands, was hired to direct the film from the script by DeMonaco.

On September 19, 2017, newcomers Y'lan Noel and Lex Scott Davis were cast in the film as the lead characters, and the setting was announced as Staten Island. Principal photography began in mid-September 2017 in Buffalo, New York. Filming wrapped on November 8, 2017. Kevin Lax composed the score for the film, replacing Nathan Whitehead. Back Lot Music released the soundtrack.

== Release ==
The First Purge was released on July 4, 2018, by Universal. It grossed over $137 million worldwide, becoming the highest grossing entry in the franchise, but received mixed reviews from critics like its predecessors.

=== Home media ===
The film was released on Digital HD on September 18 and on 4K UHD, Blu-ray, DVD was released on October 2. It grossed $3.5 million in home video sales.

== Reception ==
=== Box office ===
The First Purge grossed $69.5 million in the United States and Canada, and $67.5 million in other territories for a total worldwide gross of $137 million, against a production budget of $13 million.

In the United States and Canada, The First Purge was released on July 4, 2018, and was projected to gross around $25–36 million from 3,031 theaters over its five-day opening weekend. The film made $9.3 million on its first day, including $2.5 million from Tuesday night previews at 2,350 theaters, and $4.6 million on its second. It went on to open to $17.2 million (and a five-day total of $31.1 million), finishing fourth at the box office.

=== Critical response ===
On review aggregator website Rotten Tomatoes, the film holds an approval rating of 55% based on 177 reviews, with an average rating of 5.5/10. The website's critical consensus reads, "The First Purge should satisfy fans of the franchise and filmgoers in the mood for violent vicarious thrills, even if its subtextual reach exceeds its grasp." On Metacritic, which assigns a normalized rating to reviews, the film has a weighted average score of 54 out of 100, based on 39 critics, indicating "mixed or average reviews". Audiences polled by CinemaScore gave the film an average grade of "B−" on an A+ to F scale. The film drew attention for its critique of the Trump administration and U.S. politics in general.

== See also ==
- List of African American films of the 2010s
