= The Forever Purge =

2021 film by Everardo Valerio Gout

- Theatrical release poster
- Directed by: Everardo Valerio Gout
- Written by: James DeMonaco
- Based on: Characters by James DeMonaco
- Produced by: Jason Blum; Michael Bay; Andrew Form; Brad Fuller; Sébastien K. Lemercier; James DeMonaco
- Starring: Ana de la Reguera; Tenoch Huerta; Cassidy Freeman; Leven Rambin; Josh Lucas; Will Patton
- Cinematography: Luis Sansans
- Edited by: Todd E. Miller; Vincent Tabaillon; Tim Alverson
- Music by: The Newton Brothers
- Production companies: Universal Pictures; Perfect World Pictures; Blumhouse Productions; Platinum Dunes; Man in a Tree Productions
- Distributed by: Universal Pictures
- Release date: July 2, 2021 (United States)
- Running time: 103 minutes
- Country: United States
- Languages: English; Spanish
- Budget: $18 million
- Box office: $77 million

The Forever Purge is a 2021 American action horror film serving as the fifth film in The Purge franchise, serving as a sequel to The Purge: Election Year, and was originally intended as the final installment. Written and produced by series creator James DeMonaco, it was directed by Everardo Valerio Gout. The film stars Ana de la Reguera, Tenoch Huerta, Josh Lucas, Cassidy Freeman, Leven Rambin, Alejandro Edda, and Will Patton, and follows a group of people who attempt to escape the United States after an insurrectionist movement continues committing crime and murder nationwide after the 2049 Purge's ending.

Delayed from an original July 2020 date due to the COVID-19 pandemic, The Forever Purge was theatrically released on July 2, 2021, by Universal Pictures. The film grossed $77 million worldwide against its $18 million budget and received mixed reviews from critics, with praise for its performances and action sequences but criticism for its writing.

== Plot ==
In 2048, eight years after Charlie Roan's presidential election, the New Founding Fathers of America (NFFA) party has been re-elected and have re-instituted the annual Purge with its original rules. White supremacists and nativism have surged nationwide following their re-election, and many outside the ruling party are concerned that the upcoming Purge will inflict more damage on the country than the NFFA realizes. Mexican couple Juan and Adela illegally cross the border into Texas to build a new life near Austin, with Juan working as a farmhand on the Tucker family ranch while Adela works in town.

Ten months later, on the eve of the 2049 Purge, Juan and Adela join a migrant community behind a walled sanctuary with armed security to protect them. As the Purge begins, Adela witnesses a nationalist Purger group, who declare themselves to be the Purge Purification Force (PPF), intent on killing those people that they consider non-American. The migrant community survives the Purge with no incidents. Come morning, Juan and Adela return to their jobs, but both notice that many of their co-workers did not report to work. Adela is attacked by two self-proclaimed Forever Purgers, but she is rescued by her boss, Darius, before the police arrests both for killing their attackers.

Juan and fellow migrant co-worker T.T. discover that the Tucker family has been taken hostage by their white farmhands, Forever Purgers, intending to take the ranch for themselves. Patriarch Caleb Tucker sacrifices himself and distracts the Purgers long enough for Juan and T.T. to rescue his son Dylan, Dylan's pregnant wife Cassie, and Dylan's sister Harper. As they drive off to search for Adela, the news confirms that civilians nationwide, connecting via social media, have declared a Forever Purge, opposing NFFA orders to stand down.

The group rescues Adela and Darius from Purgers. Darius stays behind to search for his family while the others escape from a burning Austin. At a gas station, they hear news reports that, to protect non-Purger civilians, Canada and Mexico have opened their borders for the next six hours. Following that, the borders will close and entry will be denied. The group decides to escape across the Mexican border at El Paso.

By the time the group arrives in a chaotic El Paso, the NFFA has invoked martial law across the United States to contain the violence. Fighting through El Paso, Adela and Cassie are split from the group by military forces. At the same time, Juan, T.T., Dylan, and Harper are captured by the PPF, with their Alpha Leader offering Dylan and Harper a chance to live if they kill T.T. and Juan. When they refuse, the Purgers murder T.T. just before the military intervenes, allowing the group to escape. However, the military is forced to withdraw from El Paso when more Purgers destroy their base. In response, the Canadian and Mexican governments announced the early closure of their borders, leaving those who gathered to cross them vulnerable to the Purgers.

Downtown, Adela protects Cassie from other Purgers, revealing that she and Juan had once been members of a self-defense group who trained them to fight against Mexican drug cartels. The diminished group reunites at a hidden safe house run by a local Native American tribe. The tribe's leader, Chiago, offers to transport everyone across the border as refugees. In the desert, Juan, Adela, and Dylan, along with Chiago and his men, stand against Alpha and the PPF to give the other refugees time to escape. When their ammo runs out, the group draws the PPF in for a close fight with hand weapons. In the ensuing battle, the Purgers are killed, and Alpha takes Adela hostage. However, Juan and Dylan work together to subdue and kill Alpha. The trio rejoins the others in a refugee camp across the Mexican border, where Dylan finds Harper and Cassie, and meets his newborn daughter.

News reports indicate that the NFFA has dispatched troops but is being destroyed by the violence it no longer controls; more Americans have crossed the Canadian and Mexican borders as refugees, while many are rallying to fight back against the Purgers.

== Cast ==
- Ana de la Reguera as Adela
- Tenoch Huerta as Juan
- Josh Lucas as Dylan Tucker
- Leven Rambin as Harper Tucker
- Cassidy Freeman as Cassie Tucker
- Alejandro Edda as T.T.
- Will Patton as Caleb Tucker
- Will Brittain as Kirk
- Sammi Rotibi as Darius Bryant
- Zahn McClarnon as Chiago Harjo
- Verónica Falcón as Lydia (credited as Veronica Falcon)
- Jeffrey Doornbos as Elijah / Alpha
- Cindy Robinson as the Purge Emergency Broadcast System announcement voice (uncredited)

== Production ==
=== Development ===
In October 2018, James DeMonaco, the creator of the Purge franchise, said that he may write another film, and that he thought it would be a "really cool ending" to the series.

In May 2019, Universal Pictures announced the development of the untitled film. DeMonaco was confirmed as writing the screenplay, and produced the film with Sébastien K. Lemercier through their company Man in a Tree Productions. Jason Blum also produced through Blumhouse Productions, along with Michael Bay, Brad Fuller and Andrew Form through Platinum Dunes. The film is the fifth installment of the franchise, and is a direct sequel to The Purge: Election Year. In August 2019, it was announced that the film would be directed by Everardo Valerio Gout, who was hired based on his work directing episodes of the 2016 National Geographic series Mars.

=== Casting ===
In October 2019, it was announced that Ana de la Reguera would star in the film. In November 2019, Tenoch Huerta was cast as a male lead, and later that month, it was announced that Will Patton and Cassidy Freeman had been added as well. In January 2020, it was reported that Leven Rambin was cast, and Josh Lucas was also reported as playing a lead.

The film features Native American actor Jonathan Joss in his final film role.

=== Filming ===
In July 2019, it was announced that the film would be shot in California. It was awarded nearly $6.5 million in tax credits by the California Film Commission, the second film in the franchise to receive credits from California, after The Purge: Anarchy. Production was set to begin in November 2019, with 25 days of filming in San Diego County.

On November 10 and 11, filming took place in downtown Pomona, on a block of storefronts transformed into fictional businesses, including a tavern and a gun store. The next week, filming took place at a theater and an American Legion post in Ontario. Cinematographer Luis Sansans shot the film with Arri Alexa Mini LF cameras and Camtec Falcon large format lenses. Filming wrapped in February 2020.

=== Music ===
The film's score was composed by The Newton Brothers.

==== Track listing ====
No.	Title	Length
1.	"Cruzando La Frontera"	3:06
2.	"The Forever Purge"	1:39
3.	"El Caballo"	2:09
4.	"Confusing Time"	1:30
5.	"Safe House"	5:06
6.	"America Es Mexico"	1:33
7.	"Purification Trucks"	2:33
8.	"Ever After Bunnies"	3:49
9.	"Go Fu$k Yourself"	4:29
10.	"Leaving the Ranch"	3:43
11.	"I'm Coming With You"	2:08
12.	"Sinfonias de Pistolas"	1:20
13.	"Masked Mayhem"	2:33
14.	"Gente Loca"	3:11
15.	"We're In This Together"	2:29
16.	"Machine Guns And Motorbikes"	2:49
17.	"The City of Chaos Part I"	4:41
18.	"The City of Chaos Part II"	2:51
19.	"Crisis En La Frontera"	2:19
20.	"Nuestra Ultima Defensa"	7:35
21.	"La Caza"	3:13
22.	"Batalla En El Desierto"	3:49
23.	"Mexico"	4:20
24.	"Esto No A Terminado (This Isn't Over) (Snow Tha Product x The Newton Brothers)"	3:19
Total length:		76:14

== Release ==
=== Theatrical ===
In April 2020, the film's title was revealed as The Forever Purge. The film was originally scheduled for a theatrical release in the United States on July 10, 2020, by Universal Pictures. On May 15, 2020, its release was postponed indefinitely due to the COVID-19 pandemic. On July 8, 2020, it was reported that the film had been rescheduled for July 9, 2021. On April 9, 2021, it was reported that the film's American release date had been pushed up a week to July 2 with the same day for The Boss Baby: Family Business.

The film premiered in South Korea on July 10, 2021, at the 25th Bucheon International Fantastic Film Festival.

==== Corona, California shooting ====
On July 26, 2021, during a midnight showing of The Forever Purge at the Regal Edwards movie theater in Corona, California, a gunman opened fire inside the cinema, killing two people. Police responding to the shooting, and apprehended a suspect later identified as 20-year-old Joseph Jimenez shortly after arriving on the scene. The victims were identified as 18-year-old Rylee Goodrich, who died instantly, and her friend, well-known 19-year-old TikToker Anthony Barajas, who was transported to the nearest hospital and was put on life support, before dying from his injuries on July 31, 2021. In 2024, Jimenez was found guilty of the murders and was sentenced to two counts of life without parole.

In the aftermath of the shooting, the theatre was temporarily closed and all showtimes of the film were removed from its listings. After her autopsy, Goodrich's body was cremated and her ashes scattered into the Pacific Ocean off the coast of Seal Beach, California. Universal Pictures and Blumhouse Productions declined to comment.

=== Home media ===
The Forever Purge was released as a video rental on July 23, 2021, was released on digital platforms and on Movies Anywhere on September 14, 2021, and Universal Pictures Home Entertainment/Studio Distribution Services released it on Ultra HD Blu-ray, DVD, and Blu-ray on September 28, 2021. Bonus features will include an alternate ending, deleted scenes and "Collapsing The System: Behind The Forever Purge" featurette. It was also released on DVD, Blu-ray and Ultra HD Blu-ray in the UK by Universal through Warner Bros. Home Entertainment on October 18, 2021.

The Forever Purge was released on HBO Max on April 15, 2022. It also was released on HBO. The film grossed $3.7 million in home video sales.

== Reception ==
=== Box office ===
The Forever Purge grossed $44.5 million in the United States and Canada, and $32.5 million in other territories, for a worldwide total of $77 million.

In the United States and Canada, The Forever Purge was released alongside The Boss Baby: Family Business, as well as the expansion of Summer of Soul, and was projected to gross around $10 million from 3,051 theaters in its opening weekend. The film made $5.4 million on its first day, including $1.3 million from Thursday night previews, the lowest amount of the franchise. It went on to debut to $12.7 million, finishing third at the box office. With the top three films at the box office, F9, Family Business, and The Forever Purge, all having been released by Universal, it marked the first time a single studio had done so since February 2005. The film fell 43.1% in its sophomore weekend to $7.1 million, finishing fourth, then made $4.2 million in its third weekend, finishing in sixth.

=== Critical response ===
On the review aggregator website Rotten Tomatoes, the film holds an approval rating of 49% based on 161 reviews, with an average rating of 5.4/10. The site's critics consensus reads: "The Forever Purge fails to fully engage with its most frighteningly timely themes, but the franchise remains largely—albeit bluntly—effective." The site's audience consensus reads: "It's more predictable and less satisfying than some other Purge movies, but franchise fans looking for action will find it here." On Metacritic, the film has a weighted average score of 53 out of 100, based on 33 critics, indicating "mixed or average" reviews. Audiences polled by CinemaScore gave the film an average grade of "B−" on an A+ to F scale, while PostTrak reported 72% of audience members gave it a positive score, with 53% saying they would definitely recommend it.

The Playlist's Nick Allen gave the film "D+," writing that it "looks like a cheap TV movie" and that it "displays all that makes these movies a failed experiment in blockbuster exploitation." Reviewing for The A.V. Club, Anya Stanley gave the film a "D" grade, and said: "In The Forever Purge, we're told a story that a battered nation has heard a lot—a sermon of immigration and class warfare that's too heavy-handed to say anything its prospective audience hasn't been told on countless social media feeds over the last few years." Rick Bentley's review in Tribune News Service complained of "a thinly veiled attempt to capitalize on the tensions currently gripping this country. The film’s deep dive into racism comes across as manipulative, trite and uninspired." Dustin Chase wrote in The Galveston Daily News, "The Forever Purge comes to Texas to try to redefine stale franchise." Johnny Oleksinski's review in The New York Post stated: "That idea was fun once, maybe even twice, but by the fifth outing the formula has given way to preachiness and predictability."

Writing in The Detroit News, Adam Gram stated: "The fifth Purge talks a big game, employing all sorts of charged political words and theories, but doesn't do anything interesting with them." Peter Vonder Haar's review in The Houston Press analyzed: "The biggest problem with The Forever Purge is how it abandons the central conceit of the series. Previous movies focused on the protagonists' struggle to survive until the end of the Purge while simultaneously giving us wider looks at the phenomenon itself. Here, with the murderousness extending indefinitely, the characters' situation is indistinguishable from any of a thousand other shoot-em-ups." Candace McMillan wrote in Seattle Refined that the film is "ultimately just a tiresome rehash of an overused adage. It's making an obvious statement about the callous attitude we as Americans take with those less fortunate, without accounting for the many complications and intricacies within our nation as well. But shock, awe, and letdown is all that's left of a franchise that's been bled dry." Benjamin Lee's review in The Guardian reads, "It’s more of the same in the latest Purge horror, with more murderous mayhem and more half-baked attempts at social commentary.

Matthew Mongale's review for The Austin Chronicle dismissed the film as "pretty much by the numbers", while Nick Rogers in The Midwest Film Journal called the film: "The creative exhaustion of a once-engaging franchise." Ian Freer in Empire wrote: "The fifth Purge outing goes for broke and comes out wanting, working neither as political commentary nor horror-action-thriller." Writing for the site Slashfilm, Chris Evangelista states " The gunfire is constant, to the point where it becomes numbing. And after a while, you somehow grow bored with all the carnage. There's no emotional heft attached to anything happening here; we barely even care about the main characters...None of this is that thrilling, and The Forever Purge often plays like a film cobbled together from reshoots and studio notes."

== Sequel ==
Although The Forever Purge was intended to be the final installment of the franchise, producer Blum stated in June 2021 that he intends to make additional Purge films, and that he is working on convincing DeMonaco to continue the story. In July 2021, DeMonaco confirmed his concept for a sixth film to focus on Frank Grillo's character Leo Barnes from Anarchy and Election Year, and to incorporate a worldwide Purge, a concept developed for a potential third season of The Purge television series, which was scrapped. In July 2025, DeMonaco advised Bloody Disgusting that he had completed a script with the assistance of his wife, and advised that a 'favourite character' – believed to be Frank Grillo's character Leo Barnes – would be returning, along with a greater emphasis on 'female heroes'.
