= Platinum Dunes =

Film production company in Los Angeles, California

- Logo used since 2009
- Type: Private
- Industry: Film; Television
- Founded: 2001; 25 years ago
- Founders: Michael Bay; Brad Fuller; Andrew Form
- Headquarters: Los Angeles, California, United States
- Area served: Worldwide
- Key people: Michael Bay; Brad Fuller; Cameron Fuller
- Services: Film production; Television production

Platinum Dunes is an American film and television production company founded in 2001 by Michael Bay, Brad Fuller and Andrew Form. The company is mainly known for producing the horror films The Texas Chainsaw Massacre (2003), The Amityville Horror (2005), The Hitcher (2007), Friday the 13th (2009), A Nightmare on Elm Street (2010), The Purge (2013), Ouija (2014), and A Quiet Place (2018).

== Overview ==
The company was founded in November 2001 by Michael Bay, Brad Fuller and Andrew Form. The company originally partnered with Radar Pictures to produce its films. The company maintains separate operations from his own Bay Films company. The deal expired in 2004 and signed with Dimension Films. In 2006, the deal was moved to Rogue Pictures. On October 7, 2009, Paramount Pictures announced a first-look deal with Platinum Dunes. With this, they plan to branch out of the horror genre into action and thrillers. On May 27, 2010, it was announced they would work on the reboot to the Teenage Mutant Ninja Turtles film series of the same name. In 2014, Platinum Dunes was named The Hollywood Reporter's Producers of the Year. In 2014, as the Paramount deal was reupped, Bay signed a separate deal with his separately-owned Bay Films into a Paramount deal. In 2015, the company was also named to The Hollywood Reporter's 30 Most Powerful Film Producers in Hollywood. In 2018, Fuller and Form made an amicable split from Platinum Dunes to launch a new production company, Fully Formed Entertainment. In June 2022, Fuller returned to Platinum Dunes, with the company signing an overall first-look deal with Universal Pictures.

== Feature films ==
Release date	Film	Director(s)	Distributor(s)	RT	Notes
October 17, 2003	The Texas Chainsaw Massacre	Marcus Nispel	New Line Cinema	37%	Remake of the Texas Chainsaw Massacre franchise.
April 15, 2005	The Amityville Horror	Andrew Douglas	Metro-Goldwyn-Mayer	23%	Remake of The Amityville Horror (1979).
October 6, 2006	The Texas Chainsaw Massacre: The Beginning	Jonathan Liebesman	New Line Cinema	15%	Prequel to The Texas Chainsaw Massacre (2003).
January 19, 2007	The Hitcher	Dave Meyers	Rogue Pictures	19%	Remake of The Hitcher (1986).
January 9, 2009	The Unborn	David S. Goyer	Rogue Pictures	10%	—
February 13, 2009	Friday the 13th	Marcus Nispel	New Line Cinema; Paramount Pictures	26%	Remake of the Friday the 13th franchise.
March 6, 2009	Horsemen	Jonas Åkerlund	Lionsgate	17%	—
April 30, 2010	A Nightmare on Elm Street	Samuel Bayer	Warner Bros. Pictures	14%	Remake of the A Nightmare on Elm Street franchise.
June 7, 2013	The Purge	James DeMonaco	Universal Pictures	41%	Installments of The Purge franchise.
July 18, 2014	The Purge: Anarchy	James DeMonaco	Universal Pictures	59%	Installments of The Purge franchise.
August 8, 2014	Teenage Mutant Ninja Turtles	Jonathan Liebesman	Paramount Pictures	20%	Remake of the Teenage Mutant Ninja Turtles franchise.
October 24, 2014	Ouija	Stiles White	Universal Pictures	6%	—
January 30, 2015	Project Almanac	Dean Israelite	Paramount Pictures	38%	—
June 3, 2016	Teenage Mutant Ninja Turtles: Out of the Shadows	Dave Green	Paramount Pictures	38%	Sequel to Teenage Mutant Ninja Turtles (2014).
July 1, 2016	The Purge: Election Year	James DeMonaco	Universal Pictures	55%	Installment of The Purge franchise.
October 21, 2016	Ouija: Origin of Evil	Mike Flanagan	Universal Pictures	83%	Sequel to Ouija (2014).
April 6, 2018	A Quiet Place	John Krasinski	Paramount Pictures	96%	Installment of A Quiet Place franchise.
July 4, 2018	The First Purge	Gerard McMurray	Universal Pictures	55%	Installment of The Purge franchise.
December 11, 2020	Songbird	Adam Mason	STX Entertainment	9%	—
May 28, 2021	A Quiet Place Part II	John Krasinski	Paramount Pictures	91%	Installment of A Quiet Place franchise.
July 2, 2021	The Forever Purge	Everardo Valerio Gout	Universal Pictures	48%	Installment of The Purge franchise.
June 28, 2024	A Quiet Place: Day One	Michael Sarnoski	Paramount Pictures	86%	Installment of A Quiet Place franchise.
September 27, 2024	Apartment 7A	Natalie Erika James	Paramount Pictures	45%	Prequel to Rosemary's Baby (1968).
April 11, 2025	Drop	Christopher Landon	Universal Pictures	83%	—

=== Upcoming films ===
Release date	Film	Director(s)	Distributor(s)
July 30, 2027	A Quiet Place Part III	John Krasinski	Paramount Pictures
TBA	Sponsor	James Ponsoldt	Apple Original Films

== Television series ==
Year	Show	Creator(s)	Network
2014–2017	Black Sails	Jonathan E. Steinberg; Robert Levine	Starz
2014–2018	The Last Ship	Hank Steinberg; Steven Kane	TNT
2016	Billion Dollar Wreck	—N/a	History
2018–2023	Jack Ryan	Carlton Cuse; Graham Roland	Amazon Prime Video
2018–2019	The Purge	James DeMonaco	USA Network
2020	The Expecting	Ben Ketai	Quibi

== Books ==
Release date	Comic	Writer	Publisher
July 16, 2025	Big Rig	Post Malone; Adrian F. Wassel	Vault Comics

== See also ==
- Michael Bay
- Blumhouse Productions
- Dark Castle Entertainment
- Ghost House Pictures
- Gold Circle Films
- Twisted Pictures
