= Sponsor (upcoming film) =

- Directed by: James Ponsoldt
- Written by: Jason Segel; James Ponsoldt
- Produced by: James Ponsoldt; Jason Segel; Michael Bay; Brad Fuller; Alex Ginno
- Starring: Jason Segel; John C. Reilly; Amy Madigan; Justine Lupe
- Cinematography: Jonathan Sela
- Production companies: Apple Studios; Platinum Dunes
- Distributed by: Apple TV
- Country: United States
- Language: English

Sponsor is an upcoming American psychological thriller film directed by James Ponsoldt, who co-wrote the screenplay with Jason Segel. It stars Segel, John C. Reilly, Amy Madigan, and Justine Lupe.

== Premise ==
Following a drunk driving arrest, a man finds a sponsor for his recovery program.

== Cast ==
- Jason Segel as Peter
- John C. Reilly as Jerry, Peter's sponsor
- Amy Madigan
- Justine Lupe
- Patrick Fabian as Randall
- Rose Rollins as Deborah
- Bob Glouberman as Ronald

== Production ==
It was announced in May 2025 that Jason Segel was set to star in the film, which he would co-write the screenplay with the film's director James Ponsoldt. In October, the film was acquired by Apple TV. In December, John C. Reilly and Amy Madigan were added to the cast, with Justine Lupe joining in January 2026.

Production began in Los Angeles on January 20, 2026. Filming took place in Half Moon Bay from February 17 to February 19, 2026, using the working title Drumettes. Jonathan Sela served as the cinematographer.
