= Brad Fuller (producer) =

American film producer

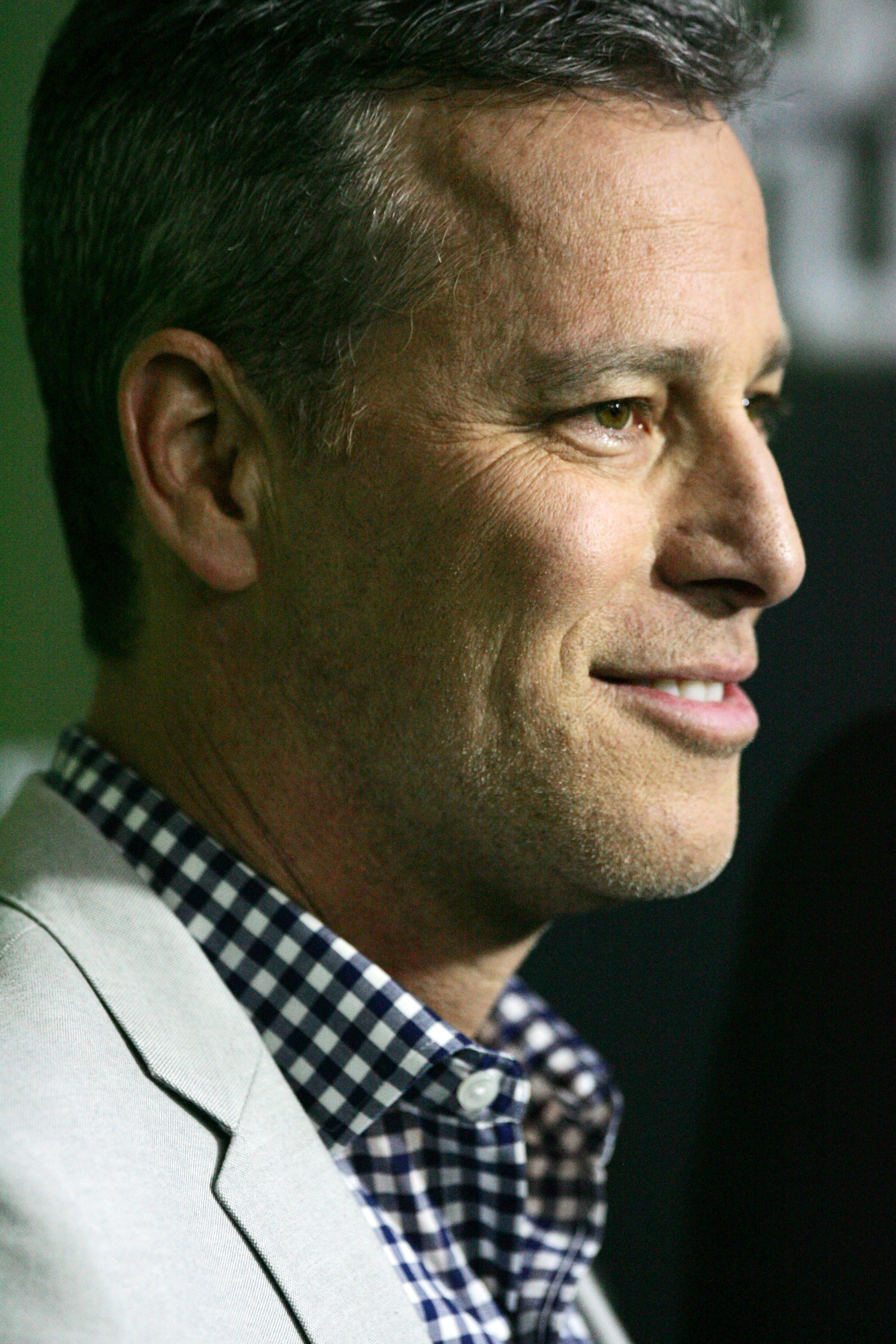
Fuller at the Sydney premiere of Teenage Mutant Ninja Turtles, 2014

Bradley Fuller (born November 5, 1965) is an American film and television producer. He co-owns Platinum Dunes, partnering with both Michael Bay and Andrew Form.

== Early life and education ==
Bradley Fuller was born in 1965 into a family of theatre owners. His parents were Irving and Bonnie Fuller (née Corwin). The Corwin family have run a theatre in Los Angeles since 1923. His grandfather Sherrill C. Corwin expanded the business and also produced movies in the 1970s.

Fuller is a 1987 graduate of Wesleyan University in Connecticut. Michael Bay, another of the co-owners of Platinum Dunes, is also an alumnus of the school (Class of 1986). Directors Joss Whedon and Miguel Arteta were also Fuller's classmates at Wesleyan.

== Career ==
Circa 2001/2002, Fuller, his childhood friend Michael Bay, and Andrew Form founded Platinum Dunes, a production company which specializes in producing horror movies, such as the remakes The Texas Chainsaw Massacre (2003), The Amityville Horror (2005), Friday the 13th (2009), and A Nightmare on Elm Street (2010), and original horror franchises such as Ouija (2014), prequel Ouija: Origin of Evil (2016), and the five The Purge films.

Fuller has produced multiple films that garnished box-office success. Both The Purge: Anarchy and Ouija (2014) have each grossed over $100,000,000 worldwide, while Teenage Mutant Ninja Turtles (2014) has reached as high as $485,000,000. Fuller, along with Platinum Dunes, was named The Hollywood Reporter (THR)'s "2014's Producers of the Year". In 2015, the company was named as part of THR's 30 Most Powerful Film Producers in Hollywood. In 2016 the company released Teenage Mutant Ninja Turtles: Out of the Shadows, The Purge: Election Year and Ouija: Origin of Evil.

In 2018, Fuller and Platinum Dunes produced the post-apocalyptic horror film A Quiet Place. The film premiered as the Opening Night film at South by Southwest on March 9, 2018, and was released in the United States on April 6, 2018, by Paramount Pictures. It became a major box office hit, grossing $332 million worldwide, and received acclaim from critics, who praised its originality and atmosphere, as well as the acting, direction, and sound design, calling it a "smart, wickedly frightening good time." On review aggregator website Rotten Tomatoes, the film holds an approval rating of 95% based on 288 reviews, and an average rating of 8.1/10. The website's critical consensus reads, "A Quiet Place artfully plays on elemental fears with a ruthlessly intelligent creature feature that's as original as it is scary." On Metacritic, the film has a weighted average score of 82 out of 100, based on 55 critics. A Quiet Place ranks sixth on the list of all-time highest-grossing films in the horror-thriller genre, and currently has the highest worldwide box office gross for a live-action film from an original screenplay since Gravity in 2013.

Later in 2018 saw the release of the fourth installment in The Purge franchise, The First Purge. The prequel and joint production between Platinum Dunes and Blumhouse Prouductions opened in the United States on The Fourth of July, and has grossed over $135 million worldwide, becoming the highest grossing entry in the franchise.

Fuller has also found success in producing for television. His TV works include the Starz series Black Sails and TNT naval drama The Last Ship. He has also produced an unscripted television show, Billion Dollar Wreck, which premiered on February 8, 2016. In 2018, Fuller and Platinum Dunes produced two new shows that debuted in the summer: Tom Clancy's Jack Ryan, an Amazon series, premiered in August while The Purge TV series premiered on the USA Network in September.

Prior to co-founding Platinum Dunes, Fuller previously worked as a talent manager, as well as produced the films Emmett's Mark, starring Gabriel Byrne and Tim Roth, and A Better Way To Die, featuring Natasha Henstridge and André Braugher.

Fuller's future projects include working with Sony on upcoming suspense film The Registration starring Sydney Sweeney, an adaptation of Madison Lawson's novel of the same name, post-apocalyptic action thriller Elevation with Anthony Mackie, Morena Baccarin and Maddie Hasson set to star, and The Caretaker starring Sydney Sweeney, the Universal Pictures adaptation of Marcus Kliewer's short story of the same name.

== Personal life ==
He and his wife, Alexandra, have two sons: Cameron, an actor, and his younger brother Paxton.

== Filmography ==
Producer

- Virtual Girl (1998)
- A Better Way to Die (2000)
- Virtual Girl 2: Virtual Vegas (2001)
- Emmett's Mark (2002)
- The Amityville Horror (2005)
- The Texas Chainsaw Massacre: The Beginning (2006)
- The Hitcher (2007)
- The Unborn (2009)
- Friday the 13th (2009)
- Horsemen (2009)
- A Nightmare on Elm Street (2010)
- The Purge (2013)
- The Purge: Anarchy (2014)
- Teenage Mutant Ninja Turtles (2014)
- Ouija (2014)
- Project Almanac (2015)
- Teenage Mutant Ninja Turtles: Out of the Shadows (2016)
- The Purge: Election Year (2016)
- Ouija: Origin of Evil (2016)
- A Quiet Place (2018)
- The First Purge (2018)
- Slender Man (2018)
- A Quiet Place Part II (2020)
- The Forever Purge (2021)
- A Quiet Place: Day One (2024)
- Elevation (2024)
- Drop (2025)
- Anaconda (2025)
- The Astronaut (2025)
- A Quiet Place Part III (2027)
- Sponsor (TBA)

Executive producer

- The Texas Chainsaw Massacre (2003)
- Black Sails (2014)
- The Last Ship (2014)
- Billion Dollar Wreck (2016)
- Tom Clancy's Jack Ryan (2018)
- The Purge (2018)

Actor

- His Name Was Jason: 30 Years of Friday the 13th (2009) (Documentary film) - Himself
- Crystal Lake Memories: The Complete History of Friday the 13th (2013) (Documentary film) - Himself
