= Lowriders (film) =

- Theatrical release poster
- Directed by: Ricardo de Montreuil
- Written by: Elgin James; Cheo Hodari Coker
- Produced by: Brian Grazer; Jason Blum
- Starring: Demián Bichir; Gabriel Chavarria; Theo Rossi; Melissa Benoist; Tony Revolori; Eva Longoria
- Cinematography: Andrés E. Sánchez
- Edited by: Billy T. Fox; Kiran Pallegadda
- Music by: Bryan Senti
- Production companies: Blumhouse Productions; Imagine Entertainment; Telemundo
- Distributed by: BH Tilt; OTL Releasing
- Release dates: June 1, 2016 (LAFF); May 12, 2017 (United States)
- Running time: 99 minutes
- Country: United States
- Language: English
- Budget: $5 million
- Box office: $6.3 million

Lowriders is a 2016 American drama film directed by Ricardo de Montreuil, written by Elgin James and Cheo Hodari Coker, and starring Demián Bichir, Gabriel Chavarria, Theo Rossi, Melissa Benoist, Tony Revolori and Eva Longoria. It was released on May 12, 2017. The film received mixed reviews from critics and has grossed $6 million.

== Plot ==
Danny is a talented but troubled graffiti artist. His mother is dead, and his father, Miguel, would rather have Danny working in the family auto shop, helping to make the coveted lowriders that are so important in their East L.A. Latino culture. Their relationship is further strained when Danny is arrested for tagging a bridge and must be bailed out.

Danny's older brother Francisco, nicknamed "Ghost", is released from a long prison stint. His relationship with his father is also strained, due to Miguel's past drinking problem, the way he treated their mother, and the fact that he didn't visit him while he was in prison. Danny enters into a relationship with a young photographer, Lorelei, who exposes him to a different avenue to share his graffiti skills. Ghost and Danny decide to enter their own car in the big Elysian Park lowrider competition, against their father's legendary "Green Poison."

When Miguel's car wins, Ghost sends his crew to destroy the car and in the ensuing confrontation, Miguel gets shot. He survives and Danny visits his father at the hospital where he encounters his crying stepmother who informs him that his father needs to see him. Danny dedicates his time to fixing another lowrider which he names "Marisol", after his mother, and showing at the El Chele exclusive invitation-only car show.

The trials and tribulations everyone faces lead Danny to decide his life's true direction, Miguel to come to terms with the consequences of all his life's actions, and a family to unite within the confines of a lowrider culture that is unique, special, and little understood.

== Cast ==
- Demián Bichir as Miguel Alvarez
- Gabriel Chavarria as Daniel "Danny" Alvarez
- Theo Rossi as Francisco "Ghost" Alvarez
- Melissa Benoist as Lorelai
- Tony Revolori as Chuy Herrera
- Eva Longoria as Gloria Alvarez
- Cress Williams as Detective Williams
- David Fernandez Jr. as MC
- Yvette Monreal as Claudia
- Montse Hernandez as Isabel
- Noel Gugliemi as Angel
- Bryan Rubio as Gordo

== Production ==
=== Casting ===
On May 21, 2015, Melissa Benoist joined the cast, replacing Lily Collins and Nicola Peltz. On June 1, 2015, Gabriel Chavarria joined the cast.

=== Filming ===
Principal photography on the film began in Los Angeles on May 27, 2015. Filming was taking place in a cafe on June 4, 2015, in East Los Angeles.

== Reception ==
=== Box office ===
The film was released in the United States on May 12, 2017, along with Snatched and King Arthur: Legend of the Sword, and was expected to gross around $1 million from 295 theaters. It ended up debuting to $2.4 million, finishing 8th at the box office.

=== Critical response ===
On Rotten Tomatoes, the film has an approval rating of 58% based on 19 reviews, with an average rating of 5.9/10. On Metacritic, the film has a score 57 out of 100, based on 9 critics, indicating "mixed or average" reviews. PostTrak reported that 82% of audience members gave the film a rating of either "excellent" or "very good".

Huffington Post contributor Dwight Brown wrote: "They’ve created a compelling story with deeply drawn characters and heart-felt drama, which is perfectly dispensed and measured throughout the film. Andrés Sánchez’s camera makes the colors of the retro, lowrider autos saturated and vibrant. Interior scenes in East LA jump off the screen because of Melanie Jones’ production design and Karuna Karmarkar's set decoration. The art direction, by Hunter Brown and Eve McCarney, keeps the palette in the earth tones or bright primary colors that symbolize the culture and the locale. Mirren Gordon-Crozier takes great pains to make the clothes look real, like they belong to the characters and not the wardrobe department. Editors Billy Fox (Straight Outta Compton) and Kiran Pallegadda (American Heist) put their foot on the gas pedal and don't let up until the final credits come after 98 judiciously chosen minutes of footage. Overall, the film's consistent feel and tone is the product of director Ricardo de Montreuil, who uses his background in film TV, advertising and print to make each set visually appealing. Every scene is racked with emotion and every performance is as resolved as possible. Montreuil gives audiences an intimate look at a car culture and a Latino/American experience that had become the lifeblood of Southern California."

== See also ==
- List of hood films
