= Edwin Hodge =

American actor (born 1985)

- Born: Edwin Martel Basil Hodge; January 26, 1985 (age 41); Jacksonville, North Carolina, U.S.
- Occupation: Actor
- Years active: 1993–present
- Spouse: Skye P. Marshall (m. 2024)
- Relatives: Aldis Hodge (brother)

Edwin Martel Basil Hodge (born January 26, 1985) is an American actor. He is recognized for portraying Dante Bishop in The Purge film series, and is the only actor to appear in all of the first three films.

== Early life ==
Hodge was born on January 26, 1985, in Jacksonville, North Carolina, to Aldis Basil Hodge and Yolette Evangeline Richardson, but he was raised in New York. Hodge's mother is from Florida and his father from St. Thomas, US Virgin Islands. Both of his parents served in the U.S. Marine Corps. He is the older brother of actor Aldis Hodge.

== Career ==
Hodge guest starred on an episode of the TNT series Leverage which stars his younger brother. He guest starred on an episode of One Tree Hill.

Hodge played the role of "the Bloody Stranger" in the horror film The Purge (2013) and its sequels The Purge: Anarchy (2014) and The Purge: Election Year (2016); "the Bloody Stranger" was revealed to be named Dante Bishop in the third film. He also appeared in the horror film As Above, So Below (2014).

Hodge also played the role of firefighter Rick Newhouse on Chicago Fire.

In 2019, Hodge played the role of Clayton Poole, husband of NASA astronaut Danielle Poole, in the first season of the Apple TV+ original science fiction space drama series For All Mankind. Since 2022, Hodge has played the role of Special Agent Ray Cannon on the CBS series FBI: Most Wanted.

== Personal life ==
He married actress Skye P. Marshall on June 29, 2024 at Carondelet House in Los Angeles.

== Filmography ==
=== Film ===
Year	Title	Role	Notes
1995	Die Hard with a Vengeance	Dexter's friend	
1996	The Long Kiss Goodnight	Todd Henessey	
1997	Shadow Zone: My Teacher Ate My Homework	Cody	
1999	The Breaks	Tiki	
2000	Big Momma's House	Basketball Teen #1	
2002	A Light in the Forest	Krebs	
2002	Coastlines	Roy	
2003	Hangman's Curse	Blake Hornsby	
2003	National Lampoon Presents Dorm Daze	Tony	
2004	Debating Robert Lee	Elliot Davis	
2004	The Alamo	Joe	
2004	The Cure for a Diseased Life	Julio	Deleted scenes
2005	Control	Kieran	
2005	Fighting the Odds: The Marilyn Gambrell Story	Darnell	
2006	All the Boys Love Mandy Lane	Bird	
2008	Beautiful Loser	Teenage Morgan	
2009	Kill Theory	Paul	Uncredited
2011	Take Me Home Tonight	Bryce	
2012	Red Dawn	Danny Jackson	
2013	The Purge	Dante Bishop	
2014	The Purge: Anarchy	Dante Bishop	
2014	As Above, So Below	Benji	
2016	The Good Neighbor	Officer Palmer	
2016	The Purge: Election Year	Dante Bishop	
2018	Bumblebee	Agent Danny Bell	
2019	If Not Now, When?	Walter	
2021	The Tomorrow War	Dorian	
2021	Injustice	Mister Terrific, Killer Croc	Voice
2024	Parallel	Martel	Also writer and producer

=== Television ===
Year	Title	Role	Notes
1993–1995	Sesame Street	Himself	Recurring
1995	New York Undercover	Memo	Episode: "Man's Best Friend"
1998	7th Heaven	Freshman Guy #1	Episode: "...And a Nice Chianti"
1998	Beyond Belief: Fact or Fiction	Camper #2	Episode: "The Wall/The Chalkboard/The Getaway/The Prescription/Summer Camp"
2000	Angel	Kennan	Episode: "First Impressions"
2000–2002	Boston Public	Jamaal Crenshaw	13 episodes
2001	Grounded for Life	Guy #2	Episode: "Jimmy's Got a Gun"
2003	Touched by an Angel	Jesse	Episode: "As It Is in Heaven"
2004–2005	Jack & Bobby	Marcus Ride	Main cast, 20 episodes
2005	Cold Case	Vaughn Bubley (age 18)	Episode: "Saving Patrick Bubley"
2006	Invasion	Brett	4 episodes
2006	Grey's Anatomy	Greg Stanton	Episode: "Let the Angels Commit"
2009	Ghost Whisperer	John	Episode: "Ghost Busted"
2009	Heroes	Young Charles Deveaux	Episode: "1961"
2009	Bones	Robert Hooper	Episode: "The Beaver in the Otter"
2009	Mental	Malcolm Darius Washington	12 episodes
2010	Leverage	Billy Epping	Episode: "The Jailhouse Job"
2010	One Tree Hill	Will Bennett	Episode: "The Space in Between"
2010	CSI: Miami	James Reed	Episode: "Reality Kills"
2012	NCIS	Bodie	Episode: "The Namesake"
2012	Private Practice	Aaron	Episode: "The Standing Eight Count"
2012–2013	Cougar Town	Wade	Recurring role (seasons 3–4)
2013	NCIS: Los Angeles	Kai Ashe	2 episodes
2013–2015	Chicago Fire	Rick Newhouse	Recurring role (seasons 2–3, 12 episodes)
2016	Rosewood	Doug Russell	Episode: "Spirochete & Santeria"
2016	Secrets and Lies	Dr. Greg Young	Recurring role
2017	Sleepy Hollow	Benjamin Banneker	4 episodes
2017–2018	Six	Robert Chase	Main cast, 18 episodes
2018–2019	Mayans M.C.	Officer Franky Rogan	Recurring
2019	For All Mankind	Clayton Poole	3 episodes
2020	All Rise	Joey Beto	Episode: "Dancing at Los Angeles"
2022	Good Sam	Dr. Malcolm A. Kingsley	Main cast
2022–2025	FBI: Most Wanted	Special Agent Ray Cannon	Main cast
2026	Matlock	Langston Wright	Recurring
