= The Purge =

American anthology media franchise

- Created by: James DeMonaco
- Original work: The Purge (2013)
- Owner: Universal Pictures
- Years: 2013–2021

Films and television
- Films: The Purge (2013); The Purge: Anarchy (2014); The Purge: Election Year (2016); The First Purge (2018); The Forever Purge (2021)
- Television series: The Purge (2018–2019)

The Purge is an American anthology media franchise centered on a series of dystopian action horror films distributed by Universal Pictures and produced by Blumhouse Productions and Platinum Dunes, which are written and in some cases also directed by James DeMonaco, who was inspired by a Star Trek: The Original Series episode, "The Return of the Archons". The films present a seemingly normal, crime-free America in the near future. However, the country is a dystopia which observes an annual event known as "the Purge", in which all crime, including murder, is legal for a 12-hour period.

The franchise began in 2013 with The Purge, directed by creator DeMonaco, who also directed two of the sequels and wrote the screenplays for all films in the series. A fifth installment, The Forever Purge, was released on July 2, 2021. In addition to the films, the franchise has spawned a television series, The Purge, created by DeMonaco, who also wrote its pilot episode; it has two seasons, each season acting as a mostly self-contained story in the same universe as the films. It premiered on September 4, 2018, and concluded on December 17, 2019.

All installments in the franchise, including the television series, have received mixed reviews from critics, who frequently praised the action, tension and performances but criticized the writing; the franchise's prominent social commentary on issues such as violence, politics, class conflict and race was noted, although a number of critics felt that they were undermined by the violence and formulaic writing. All of the films were commercially successful, with each film making several times its cost in revenue. The films have grossed over $500 million overall against a combined production budget of $53 million.

== Films ==
Film	U.S. release date	Director(s)	Screenwriter(s)	Producer(s)
The Purge	June 7, 2013	James DeMonaco	James DeMonaco	Jason Blum, Brad Fuller, Andrew Form, Michael Bay & Sebastien Lemercier
The Purge: Anarchy	July 18, 2014	James DeMonaco	James DeMonaco	Jason Blum, Brad Fuller, Andrew Form, Michael Bay & Sebastien Lemercier
The Purge: Election Year	July 1, 2016	James DeMonaco	James DeMonaco	Jason Blum, Brad Fuller, Andrew Form, Michael Bay & Sebastien Lemercier
The First Purge	July 4, 2018	Gerard McMurray	James DeMonaco	Jason Blum, Brad Fuller, Andrew Form, Michael Bay & Sebastien Lemercier
The Forever Purge	July 2, 2021	Everardo Gout	James DeMonaco	Jason Blum, Brad Fuller, Andrew Form, Michael Bay, James DeMonaco & Sebastien Lemercier

=== The Purge (2013) ===
The Purge stars Ethan Hawke, Lena Headey, Max Burkholder, Adelaide Kane, Edwin Hodge, Rhys Wakefield, Tony Oller and Arija Bareikis.

The film, set in the year 2022, depicts the struggle of a wealthy family who acquired their wealth by selling security systems for use during the annual purge after one of their children aids a civilian targeted by the event's participants.

Despite mixed reviews, the film grossed $89.3 million during its run, far surpassing its $3 million budget. The film was turned into a scare zone in 2014 for Universal Parks & Resorts annual Halloween Horror Nights due to its success.

=== The Purge: Anarchy (2014) ===
The Purge: Anarchy stars Frank Grillo, Carmen Ejogo, Zach Gilford, Kiele Sanchez, Zoë Soul and Michael K. Williams, while Edwin Hodge briefly reprises his role of "The Stranger" from the first movie.

Set one year later but unlike the first Purge film, which was set entirely in one house during the carnage, Anarchy follows a waitress and her daughter who go out to the Los Angeles area during the annual purge, eventually running into an anti-purge group who offers them some protection.

The film generally received mixed reviews, but many critics believed that it was much better than the first film, and it was a box office success as it grossed $111.9 million, recovering its $9 million budget by more than ten times.

=== The Purge: Election Year (2016) ===
The third film was released on July 1, 2016. Frank Grillo and Edwin Hodge reprise their roles from the previous film and are joined by Elizabeth Mitchell, who plays Senator Charlie Roan. On October 6, it was announced that James DeMonaco would be back for the third film to write and direct, while producers Sébastien K. Lemercier, Blumhouse Productions' Jason Blum, and Platinum Dunes partners Michael Bay, Brad Fuller, and Andrew Form would also be back. Shooting began on September 16 in Woonsocket, Rhode Island.

The film, set in 2040, takes place during a presidential election year in the United States wherein a senator runs for the presidency in an effort to end the annual purge after her family was murdered during the event when she was a teenager.

The film received mixed reviews from critics and went on to gross over $118 million worldwide against a budget of $10 million, becoming the second highest-grossing film of the series.

=== The First Purge (2018) ===
In September 2016, James DeMonaco, who wrote and directed every film in the series thus far, stated that the fourth film would be a prequel to the trilogy. The film shows how the United States got to the point of accepting the Purge.

The prequel film, set in 2016, takes place in the New York City borough of Staten Island and explores the origins of the carnage in the United States, which was done as an experiment to combat crime and poverty. The only place in which the Purge is occurring, Staten Island, is completely locked down for those who choose to participate and those who do wear contact lens with a built-in camera during the purge and will be paid $5,000 for staying in Staten Island, along with receiving additional money for full participation. However, when Staten Island's residents take advantage of the experiment by committing minor criminal activity such as small felonies, misdemeanors, infractions, petty crimes, and disorderly conducts, corrupt NFFA officials become determined to get the expected results through illegal methods.

In February 2017, DeMonaco announced that a fourth installment was in development. DeMonaco returned to write the script, while Jason Blum, Michael Bay, Brad Fuller, and Andrew Form returned to produce the film with Sébastien K. Lemercier. In July 2017, it was announced that Gerard McMurray was signed to direct the film, and shooting began in September 2017 in Buffalo, New York. The film was released on July 4, 2018, to mixed reviews from critics and went on to gross over $137 million worldwide on a $13 million budget, becoming the highest grossing entry in the franchise.

=== The Forever Purge (2021) ===
In October 2018, James DeMonaco, the creator of The Purge, stated that the fifth film was set to be the last film in the series, stating that "it will be a really cool ending, how we take this one home."

The film takes place eight years after Election Year, in 2048 and 2049, and the Purge has been reinstated by the re-elected New Founding Fathers of America (NFFA). In response to eight years without a Purge, an anti-immigration hate group which is known as The Forever After Purge continues the Purge after the end of the purge, proceeding to wipe the government out, take control of major cities in the country and commence what it calls a "purification" of the country. The primary targets of the group's purification campaign are immigrants and members of the upper classes.

In August 2019, it was announced that Everardo Valerio Gout will direct the film. The film was initially scheduled to be released in the United States on July 10, 2020, by Universal Pictures. In May 2020, the film was delayed indefinitely due to the COVID-19 pandemic. In July 2020, the film was rescheduled for July 9, 2021. In April 2021, it was moved forward a week to July 2, 2021. The film grossed $77 million worldwide against its $18 million budget.

=== Untitled sixth film ===
In June 2021, producer Jason Blum stated that he intends to make additional Purge films and that he is working on convincing DeMonaco to continue the story. The producer stated that he would not make more without the filmmaker's collaboration. DeMonaco later stated that up until four months previous he had intended The Forever Purge to be the final film in the franchise. The filmmaker stated that one day he woke up with another idea where he could "flip this thing upside down and we can continue... in a way that people can enjoy." DeMonaco confirmed that he is working on the script while stating that whether it is made, depends on the reception to the previous film.

In September 2021, in an interview with Nightmare on Film Street, DeMonaco stated that the story for the film includes Frank Grillo reprising his role as Leo Barnes. The story includes a worldwide Purge, an idea that he had intended for a third season of the now-cancelled television series. By September, DeMonaco had completed the script and signed on to additionally serve as director; while Grillo officially signed on to reprise his role in the franchise. The film will take place 10 years after The Forever Purge, in 2059, while the portrayal of the dystopian "tribalized" America will be different in this film, referencing Escape from New York as an influence, and following Barnes in the midst of the Second American Civil War as he is sent on a mission through various Purge states.

== Television ==
=== The Purge (2018–2019) ===
In May 2017, it was reported that Syfy and USA Network would premiere the series in 2018. On February 26, 2018, it was announced that Gabriel Chavarria and Jessica Garza were cast as the leads in the upcoming series. On November 6, 2018, USA Network renewed the show for a second season, which premiered October 15, 2019, with 10 episodes and follows up from the events of the first season. In an interview with Scream, The Purge television series showrunner Thomas Kelly stated that a heist film set on Purge Night has been considered; this plot point was later used in the series' second season. On May 13, 2020, the USA Network canceled the series after two seasons.

== Recurring cast and characters ==
List indicators

This section includes characters who will appear or have appeared in a recurring role.

- An empty grey cell indicates the character was not in the film, or that the character's official presence has not yet been confirmed.
- ^{A} indicates an appearance through archival footage or audio.
- ^{C} indicates a cameo role.
- ^{V} indicates a voice-only role.
- ^{Y} indicates a younger version of the character.

Characters	Films						Television series	
Characters	The Purge	The Purge: Anarchy	The Purge: Election Year	The First Purge	The Forever Purge	Untitled sixth Purge film	The Purge	
Characters	The Purge	The Purge: Anarchy	The Purge: Election Year	The First Purge	The Forever Purge	Untitled sixth Purge film	Season 1	Season 2
Characters	2013	2014	2016	2018	2021	TBA	2018	2019
Megan Lewis Purge Emergency Broadcast System	Cindy Robinson^{V}	Cindy Robinson^{V}	Cindy Robinson^{V}	Cindy Robinson^{V}	Cindy Robinson^{V}	TBA	Cindy Robinson^{V}	Cindy Robinson
Dwayne "Dante" Bishop The Bloody Stranger	Edwin Hodge	Edwin Hodge	Edwin Hodge					
James Sandin	Ethan Hawke							Ethan Hawke^{C}
Mary Sandin	Lena Headey							
Zoey Sandin	Adelaide Kane							
Charlie Sandin	Max Burkholder							
Grace Ferrin	Arija Bareikis							
Mr. Cali	Tom Yi							
Mr. Halverson	Chris Mulkey							
Mrs. Halverson	Tisha French							
Mr. Ferrin	Dana Bunch							
Freak Purgers	Tyler Osterkamp Nathan Clarkson	Tyler Osterkamp Nathan Clarkson						
Polite Leader	Rhys Wakefield	Rhys Wakefield^{A}						
Blonde Female Freak Purger	Alicia Vela-Bailey	Alicia Vela-Bailey^{A}						
Leo Barnes The Sergeant		Frank Grillo	Frank Grillo			Frank Grillo		
Eva Sanchez		Carmen Ejogo	Mentioned					
Shane		Zach Gilford	Mentioned					
Liz		Kiele Sanchez	Mentioned					
Cali Sanchez		Zoë Soul	Mentioned					
Big Daddy		Jack Conley						
Papa Rico Sanchez		John Beasley						
Carmelo Johns		Michael K. Williams						
President Charlene "Charlie" Roan			Elizabeth Mitchell Christy Coco^{Y}		Elizabeth Mitchell^{V}	TBA		
Joe Dixon			Mykelti Williamson					
Marcos Dali			Joseph Julian Soria					
Laney Rucker "la pequeña muerte"			Betty Gabriel					
Earl Danzinger			Terry Serpico					
Minister Edwidge Owens			Kyle Secor					
Dmitri Cimber				Y'lan Noel				
Nya Charms				Lex Scott Davis				
Isaiah Charms				Joivan Wade				
Dolores				Mugga				
Arlo Sabian Chief of Staff				Patch Darragh				
Dr. May Updale The Architect				Marisa Tomei				
Adela					Ana de la Reguera			
Juan					Tenoch Huerta			
Dylan Tucker					Josh Lucas			
Harper Tucker					Leven Rambin			
Cassie Tucker					Cassidy Freeman			
T.T.					Alejandro Edda			
Caleb Tucker					Will Patton			
Bobby Sheridan							Dermot Mulroney^{V}	Dermot Mulroney
Miguel Guerrero							Gabriel Chavarria	
Jenna Betancourt							Hannah Emily Anderson	
Penelope Guerrero							Jessica Garza	
Lila Stanton							Lili Simmons	
Jane Barbour							Amanda Warren	
Rick Betancourt							Colin Woodell	
Joe Owens							Lee Tergesen	
Marcus Moore								Derek Luke
Ryan Grant								Max Martini
Esme Carmona								Paola Núñez
Ben Gardner								Joel Allen

== Fictional premise ==
=== Origins of the annual purge ===
In 2014, following an economic collapse and rising social unrest, a political organization named The New Founding Fathers of America (NFFA) is formed and voted into office. The organization establishes a new totalitarian government and a police state. In 2016, the NFFA devises a plan to help stabilize American society, and later in 2017, the 28th Amendment to the U.S. Constitution is ratified. This amendment establishes a 12-hour event known as "The Purge" which would take place from 7 PM on March 21 to 7 AM on March 22 wherein almost all crime becomes legal. Before the Purge begins, the Emergency Broadcast System (the predecessor to the Emergency Alert System, which returned for unexplained reasons) is activated with rules and a prayer saying "Blessed be our New Founding Fathers and America, a nation reborn" before ending with "May God be with you all".

=== Rules ===
The rules for the annual Purge are as follows:

- Sirens blare throughout the land to signal the start and end of The Purge.
- All police, fire, and emergency medical services are suspended for the duration of the carnage.
- The president, first family, and government officials of rank 10 are granted immunity from the Purge, meaning that they must not be harmed. (This was revoked in Election Year to permit the murder of political opponents, including Roan).
- Only Class 1–4 weaponry is permitted, while Class 5 arms (such as explosives) is prohibited.
- Violations of any Purge rules will result in public execution.

=== Emergency broadcast system message ===
Below is how the Emergency Broadcast System announces the Purge's commencement in the first two films:

This is not a test.

This is your emergency broadcast system announcing the commencement of the Annual Purge sanctioned by the U.S. Government. Weapons of class 4 and lower have been authorized for use during the Purge. All other weapons are restricted. Government officials of ranking 10 have been granted immunity from the Purge and shall not be harmed. Commencing at the siren, any and all crime, including murder, will be legal for 12 continuous hours. Police, fire, and emergency medical services will be unavailable until tomorrow morning at 7 a.m. when The Purge concludes. Blessed be our New Founding Fathers and America, a nation reborn.

May God be with you all.

— Purge Emergency Broadcast System

In The Purge: Election Year, the rule granting immunity to ranking 10 officials is revoked by the NFFA to assassinate Roan, an anti-Purge Presidential candidate who runs on a platform of overturning the 28th Amendment which, to the NFFA's distress, has achieved parity in the polls with their candidate. This change is reflected in the announcement of the final Purge's commencement as follows:

This is not a test.

This is your emergency broadcast system announcing the commencement of the Annual Purge, sanctioned by the U.S. Government. Commencing at the siren, any and all crime, including murder, will be legal for 12 continuous hours. Weapons of class 4 and lower have been authorized for use during the Purge. All other weapons are restricted. Police, fire and emergency medical services will be unavailable until tomorrow morning at 7 am. And, for the first time since its inception, no one has been granted special immunity from the Purge. No citizen or group will be exempt. Blessed be our New Founding Fathers and America, a nation reborn.

May God be with you all.

— Purge Emergency Broadcast System

The First Purge, taking place in 2016 on Staten Island, New York, was blocked off from all contact due to the First Purge really being a social experiment conducted by the New Founding Fathers, providing monetary compensation of at least $5,000 to anyone who decides to stay on the island for the night, one year prior to the first nationwide Purge. Below is the commencement speech:

This Is Not a Test.

This is your Emergency Broadcast System announcing the commencement of the NFFA Social Experiment on Staten Island, NY. Weapons of Class 4 and lower have been authorized for use during the experiment. All Crime, including murder, will be legal for 12 continuous hours. Blessed be our New Founding Fathers and America, a Nation Reborn.

May God be with you all.

— Staten Island Purge Emergency Broadcast System

=== Impact ===
Within the film series, the Purge has resulted in crime and unemployment rates plummeting to 1% and a strong economy. Although it's thought to be used as an act of catharsis for the U.S. populace, it's actually used as a method of artificial population control, as the unemployed poor in slum neighborhoods as well as some working-class people are usually the main targets. In Election Year, a character notes that sneaking up on a Black man on Purge night is a particularly foolish action, suggesting that Black people are used to being targets on this night. By this time it has also increased tourism as foreigners enter the US solely to participate in the Purge.

=== Timeline of events ===
Below is the fictional timeline played out in the franchise:

- 2014: Rising unemployment and a housing crisis in North America lead to the New Founding Fathers of America (NFFA) being elected to become the most powerful political party in the United States.
- 2016: NFFA chief of staff Arlo Sabian and sociologist Dr. May Updale announce a controversial social experiment to take place on Staten Island where for 12 consecutive hours, all crime will be legalized, and citizens will be allowed to release their inhibitions in any way they choose, including murder, a practical examination of a thought experiment developed by Updale.
- March 21–22, 2016: The NFFA Social Experiment occurs in the New York City borough of Staten Island as a "NFFA Social Experiment", dubbed "The Purge" by Sabian on the suggestion of a crazed drug addict named Skeletor. After the majority of the inhabitants of Staten Island (minus Skeletor) engage in low-level crimes rather than high-level violent ones such as murder, Sabian rigs the experiment by deploying masked mercenary groups to the island to kill citizens. Updale is executed when she discovers the sabotage and Sabian's corruption. After the NFFA declare the purge a success, President Bracken authorizes the Annual National Purges.
- March 21–22, 2017: The first national Purge in the United States occurs. Occurring as a national experiment to determine whether the Purge can be implemented nationwide. After the success, the 28th amendment is ratified imposing a national Purge annually.
- March 21-22, 2018: The First Annual Purge in the United States occurs.
- March 21–22, 2022: National acceptance of the Purge; the Sandin family saves the life of homeless man Dante Bishop, while the family patriarch, James Sandin, is killed by the purgers and the Sandin's jealous neighbours. Elsewhere, Charlie Roan's family is killed by another batch of purgers, leaving her as the only survivor, while Leo Barnes' son, Nicholas, dies after being struck by a drunk driver.
- March 21–22, 2023: Carmelo Johns forms an anti-NFFA resistance movement with Dante as his partner. Leo Barnes considers murdering his son's killer, who was not arrested due to a legal error, before changing his mind at the last minute.
- June 21, 2023: In the United States, The NFFA designates June 21st as Purge Remembrance Day in honor of those who died during the Purge. This holiday would continue annually three months after the annual Purge.
- March 21, 2027–March 21, 2028: European countries (such as Russia, Turkey, Belarus and the UK) have some plans to adopt a Purge night of their own in the future after seeing the success of the event in America. The European Union also has plans to adopt a new regulation or directive, similar to the Anti-Purge Act in Canada.
- March 22, 2036–March 22, 2037: Former NFFA surveillance employee Esme Carmona publicly exposes the NFFA's misdeeds before being illegally executed moments after the ending of the Purge.
- March 21–22, 2040: Dante saves the life of independent presidential candidate Charlie Roan, who seeks to end the purge, alongside Barnes, her security chief.
- May 2040: Charlie Roan is elected President of the United States and vows to end the purge, with Barnes serving as her chief of staff and head of the secret service.
- March 21–22, 2041: With the purge outlawed, would-be Purgers are arrested en masse.
- November 6, 2048: The NFFA are re-elected and state their intentions to reinstate the purge to resume the following year, citing an increase in crime and immigration as justification.
- March 21–22, 2049: The Purge is re-authorized by the NFFA after a nine-year absence. After the Purge is supposed to end, an anti-immigration hate group and NFFA offshoot the Purge Purification Force (PPF) organize a "forever Purge" across America. Canada and Mexico open their borders for asylum seekers looking to escape the "forever purge" for six hours, while the NFFA is permanently disbanded. After purgers defeat a military base in El Paso, Mexico closes the border early, leaving many survivors stranded at the border, allowing them to be mercilessly slaughtered by Purgers, as a new resistance movement forms against them.

== Reception ==
=== Box office performance ===
The Purge is one of the highest-grossing horror film franchises of all-time.

Film	Release date	Box office gross			Budget	Ref
Film	Release date	U.S.	International	Worldwide	Budget	Ref
The Purge	June 7, 2013	$64,473,115	$24,855,512	$89,328,627	$3 million	
The Purge: Anarchy	July 18, 2014	$71,962,800	$39,965,565	$111,928,365	$9 million	
The Purge: Election Year	July 1, 2016	$79,213,375	$39,374,505	$118,587,880	$10 million	
The First Purge	July 4, 2018	$69,488,745	$67,657,517	$137,056,262	$13 million	
The Forever Purge	July 2, 2021	$44,539,245	$32,455,000	$76,994,245	$18 million	
Total		$329,677,280	$204,308,099	$533,895,379	$53 million	

=== Critical and public response ===
Film	Critical		Public
Film	Rotten Tomatoes	Metacritic	CinemaScore
The Purge	39% (156 reviews)	41 (33 reviews)	C
The Purge: Anarchy	57% (144 reviews)	50 (32 reviews)	B
The Purge: Election Year	55% (164 reviews)	55 (31 reviews)	B+
The First Purge	56% (176 reviews)	54 (39 reviews)	B–
The Purge: Season 1	42% (38 reviews)	44 (13 reviews)	—N/a
The Forever Purge	48% (161 reviews)	53 (33 reviews)	B–
