= Billion Dollar Wreck =

2016 American television series

- Country of origin: United States
- No. of seasons: 1
- No. of episodes: 9

Production
- Running time: 60 minutes
- Production company: Platinum Dunes

Original release
- Network: History Channel
- Release: February 8 – April 4, 2016

Billion Dollar Wreck is a 2016 television series on the History Channel that documents Martin Bayerle's attempt to salvage the wreck of the RMS Republic. The show features Martin Bayerle, Grant Bayerle, and Tim Ferris.

== Episodes ==
No.	Title	Original release date
1	"The Mysterious Treasure of the Republic"	February 8, 2016
2	"Diver Down"	February 15, 2016
3	"Doomed to Repeat"	February 22, 2016
4	"The Gold Chamber of Secrets"	February 29, 2016
5	"How It Went Down"	March 7, 2016
6	"The Price of Gold"	March 14, 2016
7	"The Mystery Deepens"	March 21, 2016
8	"The Lure of the Republic"	March 28, 2016
9	"The Gold Rush"	April 4, 2016
