= Zoë Soul =

American actress

- Born: Zoë Soul Borde; November 1, 1995 (age 30); Ann Arbor, Michigan, United States
- Occupation: Actress
- Years active: 2006–present

Zoë Soul Borde (born November 1, 1995) is an American actress. She is best known for her roles as Hayley Young in teen drama series My Life with the Walter Boys, Kaci Reynolds in the sitcom Reed Between the Lines, and as Cali Sanchez in the 2014 film The Purge: Anarchy.

== Career ==
Zoë Soul was born in Ann Arbor, but was raised in Los Angeles. As a teenager, Soul was represented by the modeling agency Ford Models, in addition to pursuing a career in acting. From 2011 to 2015, Soul played Kaci Reynolds in 25 episodes of Reed Between the Lines, which originally aired on BET. Soul gained recognition for her performance as Eliza Birch in the 2013 film Prisoners, directed by Denis Villeneuve, where she shared an NBR Award for Best Ensemble Cast, alongside Hugh Jackman, Jake Gyllenhaal, and Viola Davis. Soul is also a singer and dancer, and performs with her band Zoë and the Bear.

== Filmography ==
=== Film ===
Year	Title	Role	Notes
2013	Prisoners	Eliza Birch	
2013	Right Mind	Jasmine	Short film
2014	Dogs in the Distance	Girl at Party	Short film (uncredited)
2014	The Purge: Anarchy	Cali Sanchez	
2017	The Last Two Lovers at the End of the World		
2018	Unfollowed	Taylor Johnson	
2020	Brown with Blue	Blue	

=== Television ===
Year	Title	Role	Notes
2006	All of Us		Episode: "Don't It Make My Brownies Blue" (as Zoë Borde)
2011, 2015	Reed Between the Lines	Kaci Reynolds	Recurring character; 25 episodes
2014	Sea of Fire	Sonya Harper	Unaired pilot
2015	Single Ladies	Casey Bridges	Guest appearance; 3 episodes
2016	Chance	Lexi	Episode: "An Infant, A Brute or a Wild Beast"
2023–present	My Life with the Walter Boys	Hayley Young	Main role
2025	High Potential	Lucy Hastings	Episode: "Behind the Music"

== Recognition ==
- 2013, NBR Award for 'best ensemble cast' for Prisoners
