= Gabriel Chavarria =

American actor

- Born: Los Angeles, California, United States
- Occupation: Actor
- Years active: 2007–present
- Children: 1

Gabriel Chavarria is an American actor. He played Jacob Aguilar in Hulu's East Los High and was the lead during Season One of USA Network's The Purge.

== Career ==
In 2007, Chavarria made his film debut Freedom Writers. The film was directed by Richard LaGravenese and was released on January 5, 2007. Chavarria played Jacob Aguilar in the Hulu series East Los High, which premiered in 2013. He played Danny, a significant role in the 2016 drama film Lowriders. Chavarria played the human soldier Preacher in the film War for the Planet of the Apes, and a deep-submergence rescue vehicle pilot aboard the American submarine USS Arkansas in Hunter Killer.

In 2018 he had a lead role in the TV series The Purge.

In 2020 he is a main character in the Netflix Original Series, Selena: The Series, playing A.B. Quintanilla, Selena's older brother, bass player, and song writer/producer.

== Filmography ==
=== Film ===
- Freedom Writers (2007)
- A Better Life (2011)
- East Los High (2013)
- Lowriders (2016)
- War for the Planet of the Apes (2017)
- The Purge (2018)
- Hunter Killer (2018)
- Selena: The Series (2020)
