= Urda: The Third Reich =

Anime original net animation

ウルダ (Uruda)
- Genre: Adventure, Science fiction
- Original net animation
- Directed by: Romanov Higa
- Studio: Romanov Films
- Licensed by: NA: Media Blasters
- Released: November 27, 2003
- Runtime: 5 minutes each
- Episodes: 5

Urda: The Third Reich (ウルダ, Uruda) is an original net animation written and directed by Romanov Higa. The story takes place circa 1943, during World War II.

== Story ==
Facing a losing war, the Nazi Party discovers a marooned spaceship capable of time travel, thus enabling them to alter the outcome of their fate. Enter Erna Kurtz, a newly hired spy who stumbles upon the Nazis' plot. With the help of her fearless friend Janet, Erna must face her past in order to secure her future.

== See also ==
- Nazi UFOs
