= The Purge (TV series) =

American horror television series

- Genre: Horror; Action thriller; Crime drama; Anthology
- Created by: James DeMonaco
- Based on: The Purge by James DeMonaco
- Starring: Gabriel Chavarria; Hannah Emily Anderson; Jessica Garza; Lili Simmons; Amanda Warren; Colin Woodell; Lee Tergesen; Derek Luke; Max Martini; Paola Núñez; Joel Allen
- Composer: Tyler Bates
- Country of origin: United States
- Original language: English
- No. of seasons: 2
- No. of episodes: 20

Production
- Executive producers: Anthony Hemingway; Michael Bay; Andrew Form; Brad Fuller; Jason Blum; Sébastien Lemercier; James DeMonaco; Thomas Kelly; Tim Andrew; James Roland; Krystal Houghton Ziv
- Producers: Aaron Seliquini; Alissa M. Kantrow; Blaine Williams
- Production locations: New Orleans, Louisiana
- Cinematography: Kevin McKnight; Yaron Levy
- Running time: 41–50 minutes
- Production companies: Blumhouse Television; Universal Content Productions (Note: Known as Universal Cable Productions for season 1); Platinum Dunes; Man in a Tree Productions; Racket Squad Productions

Original release
- Network: USA Network
- Release: September 4, 2018 – December 17, 2019

The Purge is an American action horror anthology television series, based on the film series of the same name and created by James DeMonaco. The first season premiered on USA Network on September 4, 2018, and stars Gabriel Chavarria, Hannah Emily Anderson, Jessica Garza, Lili Simmons, Amanda Warren, Colin Woodell, and Lee Tergesen, with Cindy Robinson reprising her role as the voice of the Purge Emergency Broadcast System from the films.

In November 2018, USA Network renewed the show for a second season, which premiered on October 15, 2019. The second season featured a new cast starring Derek Luke, Max Martini, Paola Núñez and Joel Allen, with Cindy Robinson again reprising her role, this time appearing as character Megan Lewis. In the fictional timeline of the franchise, the first season takes place in 2027, and the second season between 2036 and 2037, thus the series is set between the events of the films Anarchy and Election Year. In May 2020, the series was canceled after two seasons due to low viewership.

== Premise ==
With ties to the films, the series revolves around an alternate dystopian United States ruled by a totalitarian government that sanctions a 12-hour period which legalizes all crimes, including vandalism, theft, arson, and murder.

The first season follows several seemingly unconnected characters as they experience the Purge Night of 2027: Miguel Guerrero, a Marine searching for his sister Penelope who has joined a government-backed death cult; Jane Barbour, an executive who uses the Purge as an opportunity for revenge; and Jenna and Rick Betancourt, married entrepreneurs who attend a Purge party to seek investment capital from a wealthy Purge supporter.

The second season begins just as an annual Purge Night of 2036 is drawing to a close, and follows characters dealing with the consequences of that night and investigating conspiracies in the year before the next purge in 2037. One story involves ex-police officers who have become bank robbers. Another story follows an NFFA detective following a suspicious killing of a scientist friend and discovers many of their peers have also been killed in suspicious circumstances. Other stories include college fraternity members who went out on Purge Night to collect items on a scavenger hunt, before having to defend themselves and dealing with PTSD afterwards, as well as a husband and wife who survive an assailant on Purge Night, only to discover that it was a hitman sent to kill the husband and begin to investigate why. Clear connections between these characters and their stories become apparent as the plot unfolds.

== Cast and characters ==
=== Season 1 ===
==== Main ====
- Gabriel Chavarria as Miguel Guerrero, a US Marine who returns home on Purge Night after receiving a cryptic message from his sister, Penelope
- Hannah Emily Anderson as Jenna Betancourt, an anti-Purge proponent and devoted to charitable causes who is accustomed to locking down on Purge Night. Her choice to venture out for the first time leads to an encounter with violence that forces her to deal with deep truths about herself and her marriage.
- Jessica Garza as Penelope Guerrero, a member of a cult who pledges to be sacrificed but finds her faith tested when exposed to the realities. She is Miguel's sister.
- Lili Simmons as Lila Stanton, a young, rich, and rebellious woman who refuses to fit in with the pro-Purge socialite crowd. Her confidence and charm mask a vulnerability that will be exposed as she attempts to deal with unfinished business before the sun rises.
- Amanda Warren as Jane Barbour, a dedicated and hardworking finance professional who is convinced that she has hit an insurmountable glass ceiling at her firm, so she hires a Purge-assassin
- Colin Woodell as Rick Betancourt. After a lifetime of bootstrapping, he is finally climbing the social ladder, but currying favor with the pro-Purge elite presents unexpected challenges to his marriage, as he and his wife must agree on what moral price they'll pay to achieve the American dream.
- Lee Tergesen as Joe Owens, an armored, masked, and seemingly ordinary man who drives through town, intervening in acts of Purge violence while listening to the taped lectures of a motivational life coach

==== Recurring ====
- William Baldwin as David Ryker, the Managing Partner at Jane's investment firm and her boss. Confident and powerful, David leads his team with alacrity and intelligence. He appears to be a big Jane supporter but in fact may be standing in the way of her career advancement. David also harbors a Purge Night secret.
- Reed Diamond as Albert Stanton, one of the New Founding Fathers of America. He is Ellie's husband and Lila's father.
- Fiona Dourif as Good Leader Tavis, a cultist who leads her followers into danger on Purge Night
- Paulina Gálvez as Catalina, Stanton family's maid. She becomes an ally for Jenna.
- Andrea Frankle as Ellie Stanton, one of the New Founding Fathers of America. She is Albert's wife and Lila's mother.
- Jessica Miesel as Alison, one of Jane's subordinates
- Adam Stephenson as Mark Cantoff, one of Jane's subordinates
- Dominic Fumusa as Pete the Cop, a keen-eyed, ex-military man and ex-cop with a mysterious past and a dry sense of humor. He is extremely connected and respected by the community and has his finger on the pulse of the city.
- Dane Rhodes as Carmanuce Cascone, Pete's friend
- Allison King as Eileen, a woman rescued by Joe on Purge Night. She is the representative of the factory Joe was working.
- Christopher Berry as Rex, a collector of the Carnival of Flesh
- Garrett Kruithof as Kick Charlie, a man rescued by Joe on Purge Night. He is Joe's childhood bully.

==== Guest ====
- AzMarie Livingston as Bracka, a Purge mercenary hired by Jane
- Joe Chrest as Ross Bailes, neighbor of Rick and Jenna
- Deneen Tyler as Lorraine, Jane's mother
- Alyshia Ochse as Anya, Jane's co-worker
- Dylan Arnold as Henry Bodreaux, a drug addict and Penelope's ex-boyfriend
- Steve Coulter as John Owens, Joe's father. He used to work with Joe at the factory, but is now gravely ill.
- Kelly Murtagh as Paige, a woman kidnapped by Joe on Purge Night

=== Season 2 ===
==== Main ====
- Derek Luke as Marcus Moore, an accomplished professional with a loving wife and a beautiful house whose seemingly perfect life is shattered when an assassin breaks into his house on Purge Night
- Max Martini as Ryan Grant, a man who "spent his entire year precisely preparing for a massive once-a-year Purge heist with his long-time crew"
- Paola Núñez as Esme Carmona, an NFFA surveillance employee
- Joel Allen as Ben Gardner, a college student who goes out for the first time on Purge Night

==== Recurring ====
- Rochelle Aytes as Michelle Moore, Marcus' second wife
- Connor Trinneer as Curtis, Esme's boss
- Charlotte Schweiger as Vivian Ross, Esme's co-worker
- Jonathan Medina as Tommy Ortiz, part of Ryan Grant's team
- Matt Shively as Turner, Ben's friend and a pledge of Delta Tau Gamma at Cooke University
- Chelle Ramos as Sara Williams, part of Ryan Grant's team
- Jaren Mitchell as Doug Vargas, part of Ryan Grant's team
- Danika Yarosh as Kelen Stewart, Ben's girlfriend and an art history student at Cooke University
- Denzel Whitaker as Darren Moore, a student of Cooke University. He is Marcus's son and Ben's classmate.
- Christine Dunford as Andrea Ziv, a corrupted police captain and former superior of Ryan, Tommy, Sara and Doug
- Devyn Tyler as Tonya, Marcus' first wife and Darren's mother
- Jay Ali as Sam Tucker, Marcus and Michelle's neighbor and April's husband
- Rachel G. Whittle as April Tucker, Marcus and Michelle's neighbor and Sam's wife

==== Guest ====
- Cindy Robinson (Note: Despite providing the voice of Megan Lewis in season 1, Robinson is only credited in "This Is Not a Test", in which she makes an on-screen appearance.) as Megan Lewis, the Purge Emergency Broadcast System announcement voice
- Avis-Marie Barnes as Drew Adams, a professor at Cooke University. She helped Esme to walk out from darkness in the past.
- Geraldine Singer as Alice Grant, Ryan's mother
- Lawrence Kao as Andy Tran, Ben's new friend at Cooke University
- Dermot Mulroney (Note: Despite providing the voice of Bobby Sheridan in season 1, Mulroney is only credited in "Happy Holidays", in which he makes an on-screen appearance.) as Bobby Sheridan, a motivational speaker and talk radio host
- Dave Maldonado as Clint, Marcus and Michelle's neighbor. He has a grudge against Marcus.
- Ethan Hawke as James Sandin, a security system designer. Hawke reprises his role from the first film.

== Episodes ==
Overview of The Purge seasons
Season	Episodes	Originally released	
Season	Episodes	First released	Last released
1	10	September 4, 2018	November 6, 2018
2	10	October 15, 2019	December 17, 2019

=== Season 1 (2018) ===
The Purge, season 1 episodes
No. overall	No. in season	Title	Directed by	Written by	Original release date	U.S. viewers (millions)
1	1	"What Is America"	Anthony Hemingway	James DeMonaco	September 4, 2018	1.39
2	2	"Take What's Yours"	Anthony Hemingway	Thomas Kelly	September 11, 2018	1.27
3	3	"The Urge to Purge"	David Von Ancken	Mick Betancourt	September 18, 2018	1.13
4	4	"Release the Beast"	Clark Johnson	Krystal Houghton Ziv	September 25, 2018	1.13
5	5	"Rise Up"	Julius Ramsay	Jamie Chan	October 2, 2018	0.93
6	6	"The Forgotten"	Nina Lopez-Corrado	Jeremy Robbins	October 9, 2018	1.01
7	7	"Lovely Dark and Deep"	Tara Nicole Weyr	Story by : James DeMonaco; Teleplay by : Mick Betancourt & Krystal Houghton Ziv	October 16, 2018	1.03
8	8	"The Giving Time Is Here"	Michael Nankin	Thomas Kelly	October 23, 2018	0.93
9	9	"I Will Participate"	Ernest Dickerson	Nick Snyder	October 30, 2018	0.92
10	10	"A Nation Reborn"	Ernest Dickerson	Story by : James DeMonaco; Teleplay by : Nick Snyder & Jeremy Robbins	November 6, 2018	0.99

=== Season 2 (2019) ===
The Purge, season 2 episodes
No. overall	No. in season	Title	Directed by	Written by	Original release date	U.S. viewers (millions)
11	1	"This Is Not a Test"	Tim Andrew	Krystal Houghton Ziv	October 15, 2019	0.61
12	2	"Everything Is Fine"	Jessica Lowrey	James Roland	October 22, 2019	0.58
13	3	"Blindspots"	Tara Nicole Weyr	Jeremy Robbins	October 29, 2019	0.58
14	4	"Grief Box"	Jaime Reynoso	Desta Tedros Reff	November 5, 2019	0.55
15	5	"House of Mirrors"	Christoph Schrewe	Lindsey Villarreal	November 12, 2019	0.57
16	6	"Happy Holidays"	Jen McGowan	Nina Fiore & John Herrera	November 19, 2019	0.55
17	7	"Should I Stay or Should I Go"	Darren Grant	Nick Zigler	November 26, 2019	0.49
18	8	"Before the Sirens"	Patrick Lussier	James Roland & Lindsey Villarreal	December 3, 2019	0.58
19	9	"Hail Mary"	Gigi Saul Guerrero	Nina Fiore & John Herrera	December 10, 2019	0.60
20	10	"7:01am"	Tim Andrew	Krystal Houghton Ziv & Nick Zigler	December 17, 2019	0.50

== Production ==
=== Development ===
A television series about the formation of the Purge was hinted at by DeMonaco. The series would possibly deal with how the New Founding Fathers were voted to office after overthrowing the U.S. Government during an economic collapse and social unrest and how they ratified the 28th Amendment to the U.S. Constitution as well as devising the Purge. In May 2017, it was reported that USA Network would premiere the series in 2018. The series premiered on September 4, 2018. On November 6, 2018, USA Network renewed the show for a second season which premiered on October 15, 2019. On May 13, 2020, USA Network canceled the series due to low viewership.

=== Casting ===
On February 26, 2018, it was announced that Gabriel Chavarria and Jessica Garza were cast as Miguel and Penelope Guerrero. In March 2018, Amanda Warren and Colin Woodell were cast as Jane Barbour and Rick Betancourt. In April 2018, Lili Simmons, Hannah Emily Anderson, Lee Tergesen and William Baldwin were cast as Lila Stanton, Jenna Betancourt, Joe and David Ryker. In May 2018, Fiona Dourif was cast as Good Leader Tavis. In June 2019, Derek Luke, Max Martini, Paola Núñez, and Joel Allen had been cast as series regulars for the second season.

During a New York Comic Con 2019 interview, Joel Allen commented on the use of The Purge films' God mask in the TV series as "like a gift from the writers" as an actor.

Actress Hannah Emily Anderson reflected on her role as Jenna Betancourt in a July 2020 interview, commenting on The Purge's Season 1 Finale. "It was so satisfying and exhilarating. Colin Woodell and Lee Tergesen were right there with me. We made it as real as we could for ourselves, and everything else faded away. We were in our precious little acting bubble. Those are the best moments."

=== Filming ===
Filming for the first season began May 2018.

== Reception ==
=== Critical response ===
On the review aggregator website Rotten Tomatoes, the first season has an approval rating of 42% based on 38 reviews, with an average rating of 5.51/10. The website's critical consensus reads, "Bloated and boring, The Purge kills its own fleetingly fun premise and proves that not all stories work better on the small screen." Metacritic, which uses a weighted average, assigned a score of 44 out of 100 based on 13 critics, indicating "mixed or average reviews".

=== Ratings ===
Viewership and ratings per episode of The Purge
No.	Title	Air date	Rating (18–49)	Viewers (millions)	DVR (18–49)	DVR viewers (millions)	Total (18–49)	Total viewers (millions)
1	"What Is America?"	September 4, 2018	0.6	1.39	0.4	1.13	1.0	2.52
2	"Take What's Yours"	September 11, 2018	0.5	1.27	0.6	1.44	1.1	2.71
3	"The Urge to Purge"	September 18, 2018	0.4	1.13	—N/a	—N/a	—N/a	—N/a
4	"Release the Beast"	September 25, 2018	0.4	1.13	—N/a	—N/a	—N/a	—N/a
5	"Rise Up"	October 2, 2018	0.4	0.93	0.5	1.19	0.9	2.12
6	"The Forgotten"	October 9, 2018	0.4	1.01	0.4	1.01	0.8	2.02
7	"Lovely Dark and Deep"	October 16, 2018	0.4	1.03	—N/a	—N/a	—N/a	—N/a
8	"The Giving Time Is Here"	October 23, 2018	0.3	0.93	—N/a	—N/a	—N/a	—N/a
9	"I Will Participate"	October 30, 2018	0.4	0.92	—N/a	—N/a	—N/a	—N/a
10	"A Nation Reborn"	November 6, 2018	0.4	0.99	—N/a	—N/a	—N/a	—N/a

Viewership and ratings per episode of The Purge
No.	Title	Air date	Rating (18–49)	Viewers (millions)	DVR (18–49)	DVR viewers (millions)	Total (18–49)	Total viewers (millions)
1	"This Is Not a Test"	October 15, 2019	0.3	0.61	—N/a	0.58	—N/a	1.20
2	"Everything Is Fine"	October 22, 2019	0.2	0.58	0.3	0.58	0.5	1.16
3	"Blindspots"	October 29, 2019	0.2	0.58	0.3	0.57	0.5	1.15
4	"Grief Box"	November 5, 2019	0.2	0.55	0.3	0.55	0.5	1.10
5	"House of Mirrors"	November 12, 2019	0.2	0.57	—N/a	—N/a	—N/a	—N/a
6	"Happy Holidays"	November 19, 2019	0.2	0.55	—N/a	—N/a	—N/a	—N/a
7	"Should I Stay or Should I Go"	November 26, 2019	0.2	0.49	0.2	—N/a	0.4	—N/a
8	"Before the Sirens"	December 3, 2019	0.2	0.58	—N/a	—N/a	—N/a	—N/a
9	"Hail Mary"	December 10, 2019	0.2	0.60	—N/a	—N/a	—N/a	—N/a
10	"7:01am"	December 17, 2019	0.2	0.50	0.2	—N/a	0.4	—N/a

=== Accolades ===
The series was nominated for Best Action-Thriller Television Series at the Saturn Awards in 2019.

== Home media ==
The first season was released on DVD and Blu-ray in Region 1 on January 8, 2019. The second season was released on DVD and Blu-Ray in Region 1 on March 31, 2020. TV series grossed $157,953 in home video sales.
