= The Purge: Election Year =

2016 film by James DeMonaco

- Theatrical release poster
- Directed by: James DeMonaco
- Written by: James DeMonaco
- Produced by: Jason Blum; Michael Bay; Andrew Form; Brad Fuller; Sébastien K. Lemercier
- Starring: Frank Grillo; Elizabeth Mitchell; Mykelti Williamson
- Cinematography: Jacques Jouffret
- Edited by: Todd E. Miller
- Music by: Nathan Whitehead
- Production companies: Platinum Dunes; Blumhouse Productions; Man in a Tree Productions
- Distributed by: Universal Pictures
- Release date: July 1, 2016 (United States)
- Running time: 110 minutes
- Country: United States
- Language: English
- Budget: $10 million
- Box office: $118.6 million

The Purge: Election Year is a 2016 American political action horror film written and directed by James DeMonaco and starring Frank Grillo, Elizabeth Mitchell, and Mykelti Williamson. It is the sequel to The Purge: Anarchy and is the third installment in the Purge franchise. Jason Blum and Michael Bay are among the film's producers. The film follows a presidential candidate who seeks to end the Purge (where all crime is legal) and her Secret Service bodyguard as they are trapped in Washington, D.C. during the event.

The film was released on July 1, 2016, and received mixed reviews from critics. It earned more than $118 million worldwide, becoming the highest-grossing film of the series before being passed by the fourth film/prequel, The First Purge, in July 2018. A narrative sequel, The Forever Purge, was released in July 2021, while a sixth film, with Frank Grillo reprising his role from Anarchy and Election Year, is in active development.

In 2017, the film's tagline 'Keep America Great', received attention from the internet and media when it was the same slogan used by Donald Trump for his 2020 re-election campaign.

== Plot ==
In 2022, a young Charlie Roan is forced to watch as her family is killed on Purge night. Eighteen years later, Roan is a U.S. Senator running for president and promising to end the Purge nights. Leo Barnes, now firmly Anti-Purge, is head of her Secret Service security. The New Founding Fathers of America (NFFA) and their candidate, Minister Edwidge Owens, view Roan as a threat, deciding to revoke immunity for government officials, so that they or some other purgers can kill Roan legally. Roan refuses to leave the city as she wants to show solidarity with her supporters.

Watching the Senator's TV debate are deli owner Joe Dixon, his assistant Marcos Dali, and EMT Laney Rucker. A pair of teenage girls enter the store and begin stealing, only to be stopped by Joe. The girls mock him until Laney steps in, at which point they surrender their stolen goods and leave. Joe later discovers that his insurance premiums for Purge coverage have been raised beyond his affordability. Meanwhile, more tourists visit the U.S. to take part in the Purge.

On Purge night, Joe guards his store and is joined by Marcos; together, they repel an attack by the teenage girls. Laney travels the city providing medical care to the wounded. Roan decides to wait out the Purge from her home and is accompanied by Leo, Couper, Eric, and additional security forces. However, they are betrayed by Couper and Eric, who allow a paramilitary force led by Earl Danzinger to kill the security detail. Leo escorts the Senator to safety, but is wounded in the process. He detonates a bomb in the house, killing Eric and Couper.

Leo and Roan attempt to seek shelter but are ambushed by a group of Russians "murder tourists" and taken captive. Before they are executed, Joe and Marcos shoot the gang dead, having seen the pair's plight from the rooftop. As they take shelter in Joe's store, the teenage girls return with reinforcements but are rescued by Laney, who kills the girls. Danzinger then ambushes the group in a helicopter and seeks refuge in an overpass where Leo realizes they were tracked by the bullet lodged inside him, and manages to extract it as they are met by the Crips. In exchange for the group rendering medical aid to an injured Crips member's son, the gang plants the bullet elsewhere to ambush the pursuing paramilitary team.

The group arrives at an underground anti-Purge hideout run by Dante Bishop. Leo discovers that Dante's group intends to assassinate Owens to end the Purge. Roan, fearing that this will make Owens a martyr for the NFFA, tries to persuade the rebels against the plan. A large group of paramilitary personnel arrives at the hideout looking for Dante. Leo and Roan escape back to the streets and meet up with Joe, Marcos, and Laney, who had left the Triage Center earlier to return to Joe's store. While fleeing the city, the ambulance is hit by Danzinger's team, and Roan is pulled out before Leo can assist. He leads the group and Dante's team to a fortified cathedral where the NFFA plans to sacrifice her.

Before the NFFA can kill Roan, the group arrives and causes a massive shootout that kills the congregation (including the sitting president Caleb Warrens) except Owens and NFFA loyalist Harmon James, who both escape. Owens is caught by Dante's group, who still intend to kill him, but Roan, determined to beat him in the election, is able to persuade them not to (especially after Dante sees Owens demanding he kill him). The remaining paramilitary forces arrive, killing Dante and his men. Danzinger fights Leo, wherein the latter gains the upper hand. As Roan's group frees Owens' victims, James emerges from hiding and kills one of the victims, but is shot by Joe in a crossfire, who later succumbs to his injuries.

Two months later, Marcos and Laney renovate Joe's store as they watch a TV announcement declaring Roan's landslide victory. Another news report states that NFFA supporters are carrying out violent uprisings across the country in response to the election results.

== Cast ==
- Frank Grillo as Leo Barnes, former LAPD Police Sergeant turned Security Chief for Charlie Roan
- Elizabeth Mitchell as Senator Charlene "Charlie" Roan, U.S. Senator/presidential candidate running on an anti-Purge platform
  - Christy Coco as Young Charlie Roan
- Mykelti Williamson as Joe Dixon, a working class deli owner
- Joseph Julian Soria as Marcos Dali, Joe's Hispanic employee and close friend
- Betty Gabriel as Laney Rucker, a triage EMT and former purger "la pequeña muerte"
- Terry Serpico as Earl Danzinger, leader of a neo-Nazi paramilitary group
- Edwin Hodge as Dante Bishop, an anti-Purge resistance fighter who is now the leader from the previous Purge films
- Kyle Secor as Minister Edwidge Owens, a pastor of an NFFA-affiliated cathedral and presidential candidate
- Barry Nolan as Reporter #1
- Liza Colón-Zayas as Dawn, Laney's friend
- Ethan Phillips as Chief Couper, member of Roan's security team and mole
- Adam Cantor as Tall Eric Busmalis, member of Roan's security team and mole
- Christopher James Baker as Harmon James, an NFFA loyalist
- Jared Kemp as Rondo, a young injured purger
- Brittany Mirabilé as Kimmy, a schoolgirl purger
- Raymond J. Barry as Caleb Warrens, NFFA leader and President of the United States
- Naheem Garcia as Angel Munoz, Bishop's partner
- Roman Blat as Uncle Sam Purger, a foreigner from Russia who joined the Purge (credited as "Uncle Sam")
- David Aaron Baker as NFFA Press Secretary Thomas "Tommy" Roseland
- George Lee Miles as Irish Ike Jenkins, a frequent customer in Joe's deli
- Johnnie Mae as Mrs. Sabian, a frequent customer in Joe's deli
- Juani Feliz as Kimmy's schoolgirl purge partner
- Jamal Peters as Crips leader, the head of the Crips who asks Roan's team to help his comrade (credited as "Gang Leader with Dying Friend")
- Matt Walton as News 13 Reporter
- Kimberly Howe as Kimmy's other purger friend
- Cindy Robinson as the Purge Emergency Broadcast System announcement voice (uncredited) (Note: The character's real name was revealed as "Megan Lewis" in The Purge television series.)

== Production ==
=== Development ===
On October 6, 2014, it was announced that James DeMonaco would be back to write and direct the third film, while producers Sebastian Lemercier, Blumhouse Productions' Jason Blum, and Platinum Dunes partners Michael Bay, Andrew Form, and Brad Fuller, would also be back. On August 3, 2015, it was announced that Frank Grillo would return for the sequel to play Leo Barnes. On September 10, 2015, more cast was announced, including Betty Gabriel, Edwin Hodge, Kyle Secor, Joseph Julian Soria, Mykelti Williamson, and Elizabeth Mitchell.

=== Filming ===
Shooting began on September 16, 2015. Although a few scenes were filmed in Washington, DC, most of the movie was shot in Rhode Island, both in its capital Providence, and Woonsocket. The main streets of Woonsocket were transformed into the near-future Washington, DC. The NFFA-captured Catholic cathedral where Owens' purge mass takes place, as well as the cathedral crypt scenes, were filmed at the St. Ann's Church Complex. The Rhode Island State House stood in as the White House and its rotunda and some of its interiors such as the Press Room and basement were also used for filming. Numerous landmarks of both Woonsocket and Providence make cameos in the film. The Roan household was shot in another part of Woonsocket and some of the interiors were shot on a soundstage to allow more room for cameras and crew.

== Music ==
Nathan Whitehead returned to compose the score, having done the music for the first two Purge films. The soundtrack was released on July 1, 2016, to coincide with the release of the film.

== Release ==
Originally, the film was set to be released on Monday, July 4, 2016, to coincide with the Fourth of July, but was moved to Friday, July 1.

=== Home media ===
The Purge: Election Year was released on digital platforms on September 20, 2016 and on Blu-ray and DVD on October 4, 2016. A 4K UHD Blu-ray release occurred on June 12, 2018. The film grossed $7.6 million in home video sales.

== Reception ==
=== Box office ===
The Purge: Election Year grossed $79.2 million in North America and $39.4 million in other territories for a worldwide total of $118.6 million, against a budget of $10 million. Deadline Hollywood calculated the net profit of the film to be $44.8 million, when factoring together all expenses and revenues.

In the United States and Canada, the film opened alongside The BFG and The Legend of Tarzan, and was projected to gross around $25 million in its opening weekend. The film grossed $3.6 million from Thursday night previews, outperforming both of its predecessors (the original's $3.4 million in 2013 and The Purge: Anarchy's in $2.6 million in 2014). In its opening weekend, the film grossed $31.4 million, landing in between the $34 million debut for the first film and the $29 million opening for the second, and finished third at the box office behind Finding Dory ($41.4 million) and The Legend of Tarzan ($38.6 million). The film grossed a total of $34.8 million over its four-day July 4 holiday frame.

=== Critical response ===
On review aggregator website Rotten Tomatoes, the film holds an approval rating of 55% based on 165 reviews, with an average rating of 5.50/10. The site's critical consensus reads, "It isn't particularly subtle, but The Purge: Election Year's blend of potent jolts and timely themes still add up to a nastily effective diversion." On Metacritic, the film has a score of 55 out of 100 based on 31 critics, indicating "mixed or average reviews". Audiences polled by CinemaScore gave the film an average grade of "B+" on an A+ to F scale.

A.O. Scott of The New York Times gave the movie a positive review, saying ""The Purge: Election Year" takes itself just seriously enough to provide the expected measure of fun - a blend of aggression, release and relief." On the other hand, Alan Zilberman of The Washington Post gave the movie 1.5 stars out of 4, saying "Even DeMonaco seems bored by the sieges, escapes and gun battles. Silly one-liners are the only saving grace, and that's because such acting veterans as Williamson know how to sell them."

=== Accolades ===
The Purge: Election Year was nominated for Best Teaser Poster (Lindeman & Associates) at the 2016 Golden Trailer Awards. It received a nomination for Favorite Thriller Movie at the 43rd People's Choice Awards.

== Continuation ==
=== Prequel ===
In September 2016, James DeMonaco, who wrote and directed every film in the series thus far, stated that the fourth Purge film would be a prequel to the trilogy. The film will reportedly show how the United States got to the point of accepting the Purge Night.

On February 17, 2017, DeMonaco announced that a fourth installment is in development at Universal Studios. DeMonaco will write the script, while Jason Blum from Blumhouse Productions and Michael Bay, Brad Fuller, and Andrew Form from Platinum Dunes will return to produce the film with Sébastien K. Lemercier. The film was set for a July 4, 2018 release date.

On July 20, 2017, it was announced that Gerard McMurray will be directing the fourth film titled, The First Purge.

=== Sequels ===
In October 2018, James DeMonaco expressed interest to finish the Purge franchise.

By May 2019, Universal Pictures announced the fifth Purge film was in development, with DeMonaco returning to write, and acting as co-producer with Sébastien K. Lemercier through their company Man in a Tree Productions. Jason Blum also produced through Blumhouse Productions, along with Michael Bay, Brad Fuller, and Andrew Form through Platinum Dunes. The film would act as a direct sequel to Election Year.

In August 2019, Everardo Gout was tapped to direct the film, titled The Forever Purge.

By July 2021, DeMonaco was revealed to be writing for a sixth film, as Blum intends to continue the franchise. The film will be a sequel to The Forever Purge, with Frank Grillo returning to star.
