= James DeMonaco =

American filmmaker (born 1969)

- Born: October 12, 1969 (age 56); New York City, U.S.
- Occupations: Film director; screenwriter; producer
- Years active: 1996–present

James DeMonaco (born October 12, 1969) is an American filmmaker. He is best known for creating the Purge franchise, writing all five films in the series and directing the first three: The Purge (2013), Anarchy (2014), and Election Year (2016).

DeMonaco's first produced screenplay was the Robin Williams comedy Jack (1996), directed by Francis Ford Coppola.

== Personal life ==
DeMonaco grew up in Staten Island, New York. He spent eight years in Paris, France, which led him to "put a microscope" on his life after seeing the difference in the relationship toward guns and violence in Paris compared to New York. DeMonaco is of Italian descent.

He and his wife, a doctor, were almost killed by a drunk driver in Brooklyn. In anger, his wife said, "I wish we could all have one free one [a murder] a year," something which helped inspire the Purge series.

== Filmography ==
=== Film ===
Year	Title	Director	Writer	Producer
1996	Jack	No	Yes	No
1998	The Negotiator	No	Yes	No
2005	Assault on Precinct 13	No	Yes	No
2006	Skinwalkers	No	Yes	No
2009	Staten Island	Yes	Yes	No
2013	The Purge	Yes	Yes	No
2014	The Purge: Anarchy	Yes	Yes	No
2016	The Purge: Election Year	Yes	Yes	No
2018	The First Purge	No	Yes	Executive
2021	The Forever Purge	No	Yes	Yes
2021	This Is the Night	Yes	Yes	No
2025	The Home	Yes	Yes	No
2026	The Last Kiss	No	No	Yes

=== Television ===
Year	Title	Writer	Creator	Producer	Notes
1999	Ryan Caulfield: Year One	No	Yes	Executive	
2005	HBO First Look	No	No	No	Himself
2007	The Kill Point	Yes	Yes	Yes	Wrote 2 episodes
2009	Crash	Yes	No	Yes	Wrote 3 episodes
2018-19	The Purge	Yes	Yes	Yes	Wrote 3 episodes
