= The Purge: Anarchy =

2014 film by James DeMonaco

- Theatrical release poster
- Directed by: James DeMonaco
- Written by: James DeMonaco
- Produced by: Jason Blum; Michael Bay; Andrew Form; Brad Fuller; Sébastien K. Lemercier
- Starring: Frank Grillo; Carmen Ejogo; Zach Gilford; Kiele Sanchez; Michael K. Williams
- Cinematography: Jacques Jouffret
- Edited by: Todd E. Miller; Vince Filippone
- Music by: Nathan Whitehead
- Production companies: Platinum Dunes; Blumhouse Productions; Why Not Productions
- Distributed by: Universal Pictures
- Release date: July 18, 2014
- Running time: 104 minutes
- Country: United States
- Language: English
- Budget: $9–11 million
- Box office: $111.9 million

The Purge: Anarchy is a 2014 American action horror film written and directed by James DeMonaco. A sequel to The Purge and the second installment in the Purge franchise, the film stars Frank Grillo, Carmen Ejogo, Zach Gilford, Kiele Sanchez, and Michael K. Williams. Edwin Hodge reprised his role from the first film. It was released worldwide on July 18, 2014. The film is set in a near-future dystopian United States, ruled by a totalitarian government known as the New Founding Fathers of America (NFFA), that is preparing for the annual Purge, a 12-hour event that legalizes all crimes without authorities. However, an anti-Purge resistance group opposes the NFFA and the Purge.

The film grossed over $111 million and received mixed reviews from critics, who praised it as an improvement over its predecessor, but criticized its clichéd formula and screenplay. While the first film was set largely in one house, Anarchy takes place around the Greater Los Angeles area and shows more of what happens to the surroundings during the event. A third film in the series, The Purge: Election Year, was released on July 1, 2016.

== Plot ==
In 2023, as people across America prepare for the annual Purge, where all crimes are legalized, an anti-Purge resistance group formed by Carmelo Johns hacks into live feeds to denounce the NFFA.

In L.A., waitress Eva Sanchez returns home to her daughter Cali and terminally ill father Rico. As Eva and Cali prepare to barricade themselves, Rico slips out to a waiting limousine. He has offered to be killed by a wealthy family in exchange for money paid to Eva and Cali. Meanwhile, estranged married couple Shane and Liz visit a grocery store, only to be harassed by a masked gang of skateboarders and dirt bikers. Their car breaks down after being tampered with by the biker gang.

Off-duty LAPD sergeant Leo Barnes plots to kill Warren Grass. The day before the previous year's Purge, (Note: as depicted in The Purge (2013 film)) Warren struck Leo's son Nicholas while driving drunk, but was acquitted due to Nicholas dying on Purge night. Ignoring his ex-wife Janice's pleas, Leo loads up and drives out into the streets.

As Liz and Shane try to find safer hiding places, the Purge commences. Eva and Cali notice NFFA paramilitary amassing in the street below, and the superintendent, Diego, enters her apartment. Diego is gunned down by a paramilitary platoon, which captures the women to offer them to their leader, Big Daddy. Leo passes by and rescues Eva and Cali after killing the troops and wounding Big Daddy. They find Shane and Liz hiding in Leo's car. The group flees just as Big Daddy fires at them. After Leo's car breaks down, the group flees on foot.

As the group navigates the hostile streets, they find a paramilitary van surrounded by soldiers who were shot by the resistance fighters. After freeing Shane from a trap and taking guns from the abandoned truck, they head to the subways. They pass by a harmless homeless encampment, but soon after, find themselves being chased by a rampaging Pyrotechnic purging gang that invades the subway and sets the tunnel ablaze. Shane is wounded, but the group manages to escape after he and Liz destroy the gang's all-terrain vehicle and its propane tank with the salvaged guns.

The group returns to the streets, but as they near Eva’s friend Tanya's apartment building, Eva unknowingly signals a traffic camera to identify them to the paramilitary troops. They reach Tanya's house, and Tanya's family takes them in. However, Tanya's sister Lorraine murders her sister for sleeping with her husband. The group leaves the family, only to be captured by the masked gang who ambushed Shane and Liz earlier. The gang sells them to an auction, taking them to a theater where upper-class Purgers bid on them for human hunting.

After the group is forced into the arena, Leo subdues and kills a Purger, taking his weapon and night vision device, overpowering and killing several other attackers, before the head Purger calls in security. Shane is shot and killed by security forces just before the anti-Purge group attacks the compound, killing the security forces and remaining Purgers; Liz chooses to stay with the resistance fighters while Leo, Eva, and Cali leave. Leo steals a car and drives off with Eva and Cali, heading for Warren Grass.

Despite Eva and Cali's pleas to abandon his revenge plans, Leo enters the house to confront Warren. As Leo exits the house, he is shot by Big Daddy, who reveals that the NFFA secretly dispatches death squads to increase the body count because the Purge has been eliminating too few people of the lower class. Just as Big Daddy is about to kill Leo, Warren kills Big Daddy, revealing that Leo chose to forgive and spare him. Just as Big Daddy's death squad appears and Eva, Cali, and Warren prepare to defend themselves, sirens blare to signal the end of the Purge (making Big Daddy's death legal and sparing Leo). Warren takes Eva, Cali, and Leo to the hospital as news and police helicopters fly over the city.

== Cast ==
- Frank Grillo as Leo Barnes (credited as the "Sergeant"), an off duty LAPD Police Sergeant who goes out on Purge Night to find Warren Grass so he can avenge his son's death
- Carmen Ejogo as Eva Sanchez, a waitress
- Zach Gilford as Shane, estranged husband of Liz
- Kiele Sanchez as Liz, estranged wife of Shane
- Zoë Soul as Cali Sanchez, Eva's 17-year old daughter
- Justina Machado as Tanya, friend of Eva and co-worker
- John Beasley as Papa Rico Sanchez, father of Eva and Cali's grandfather
- Jack Conley as Big Daddy, leader of a Death Squad
- Noel G. as Diego, a building caretaker at Eva and Cali's residence who appears to be a disorderly drunk and obsessed with Eva
- Cástulo Guerra as Barney, father of Tanya and Lorraine
- Michael K. Williams as Carmelo Johns, leader of an Anti-Purge group
- Edwin Hodge as Dante Bishop (credited as "The Stranger"), member of an Anti-Purge group
- Lakeith Stanfield as Young Ghoul Face, leader of a purger gang paid to find and capture citizens for wealthy purgers to hunt on purge night
- Roberta Valderrama as Lorraine, sister of Tanya and wife of Roddy
- Niko Nicotera as Roddy, Tanya's brother-in-law with whom she is having an affair
- Bel Hernandez as Katherine, Tanya and Lorraine's mother
- Lily Knight as Mrs. Crawley, Eva and Tanya's employer
- Brandon Keener as Warren Grass, the person responsible for killing Leo's son while drunk driving
- Amy Price-Francis as Mrs. Grass, Warren's wife
- Vick Sabitjian as Mr. Sabian, a frequent customer in Eva's workplace
- Nicholas Gonzalez as Carlos, co-worker of Eva and Tanya
- Chad Morgan as Janice, Leo's ex-wife
- Judith McConnell as Old Elegant Woman, hostess of an elite Purge game
- Dale Dye as New Founding Father Donald Talbot
- Cindy Robinson as the Purge Emergency Broadcast System announcement voice (uncredited) (Note: The character's real name was revealed as "Megan Lewis" in The Purge television series.)

Tyler Osterkamp and Nathan Clarkson reprise their roles as Freak Purgers from The Purge in an uncredited capacity, while archive footage of Ethan Hawke, Rhys Wakefield, and Alicia Vela-Bailey as James Sandin, Polite Leader and the Blonde Female Freak Purger from The Purge is also shown over the end credits.

== Production ==
On June 10, 2013, Universal Pictures and Jason Blum announced the development of the sequel, after the success of The Purge. Initially a release date was set for June 20, 2014, although this was later pushed back to July 18. Principal photography was underway in Los Angeles when Blumhouse Productions released their countdown promo art on January 1, 2014. Filming wrapped on February 10, 2014.

=== Home media ===
The Purge: Anarchy was released on Blu-ray, DVD, and Digital on October 21, 2014. The film was released on 4K UHD Blu-Ray on June 12, 2018. It grossed $12 million in home video sales.

== Reception ==
=== Box office ===
The Purge: Anarchy grossed $72 million in America and $40 million in other countries for a total gross of $111.9 million, against a budget of $9 million.

The film was released in North America in 3,303 theaters, and earned $2.6 million in its first night. In its opening weekend, the film grossed $29.8 million, finishing in second place behind the continued run of Dawn of the Planet of the Apes. This was about $4 million less than the opening of the original film ($34 million).

=== Critical response ===
On review aggregator website Rotten Tomatoes, the film has an approval rating of 58% based on 139 reviews, with an average rating of 5.40/10. The website's critics consensus reads, "Gritty, grisly, and uncommonly ambitious, The Purge: Anarchy represents a slight improvement over its predecessor, but it's still never as smart or resonant as it tries to be." On Metacritic, the film has a weighted average score 50 out of 100, based on 32 critics, indicating "mixed or average reviews". Audiences polled by CinemaScore gave the film an average grade of "B" on an A+ to F scale.

== Sequel ==
A third film in the series titled The Purge: Election Year was released on July 1, 2016.

== Legacy ==
The film was the theme for a scare zone in the 2014 edition of Halloween Horror Nights at two of the Universal Parks & Resorts. It was also a house at Halloween Horror Nights the following year in Orlando while Hollywood received a scare zone and being the main theme of Terror Tram.
