= A Quiet Place (film series) =

American horror film series

- Official franchise logo
- Created by: Bryan Woods; Scott Beck
- Original work: A Quiet Place (2018)
- Owner: Paramount Pictures

Print publications
- Comics: A Quiet Place: Storm Warning (2026)

Films and television
- Films: A Quiet Place (2018); A Quiet Place Part II (2020); A Quiet Place: Day One (2024); A Quiet Place Part III (2027)

Games
- Video game: A Quiet Place: The Road Ahead (2024)

Audio
- Soundtracks: A Quiet Place (2018); A Quiet Place Part II (2020); A Quiet Place: Day One (2024)

A Quiet Place is an American apocalyptic and post-apocalyptic horror film series set in a world inhabited by blind extraterrestrial creatures with a heightened sense of hearing. The story was conceived of by Scott Beck and Bryan Woods.

The first film and its sequel, A Quiet Place (2018) and A Quiet Place Part II (2020), were directed by John Krasinski. The third film in the series, the spinoff prequel A Quiet Place: Day One (2024), was directed by Michael Sarnoski. The three films have a combined gross of over $900 million at the worldwide box office.

A video game based on the series, A Quiet Place: The Road Ahead, was developed by Stormind Games and published by Saber Interactive on October 17, 2024. A comic series, A Quiet Place: Storm Warning, published by IDW Publishing, began releasing on March 11, 2026.

== Films ==
Film	U.S. release date	Directed by	Screenplay by	Story by	Produced by
A Quiet Place	April 6, 2018	John Krasinski	Scott Beck, Bryan Woods & John Krasinski	Scott Beck & Bryan Woods	Brad Fuller, Andrew Form & Michael Bay
A Quiet Place Part II	May 28, 2021	John Krasinski	John Krasinski	John Krasinski	Brad Fuller, Andrew Form, Michael Bay & John Krasinski
A Quiet Place: Day One	June 28, 2024	Michael Sarnoski	Michael Sarnoski	John Krasinski & Michael Sarnoski	Brad Fuller, Andrew Form, Michael Bay & John Krasinski
A Quiet Place Part III	July 30, 2027	John Krasinski	John Krasinski	John Krasinski	Brad Fuller, Andrew Form, Michael Bay & John Krasinski

=== A Quiet Place (2018) ===
The plot revolves around a mother (Emily Blunt) and father (Krasinski) who struggle to survive and raise their children in a post-apocalyptic world inhabited by deadly, blind alien creatures with a heightened sense of hearing.

=== A Quiet Place Part II (2020) ===
The sequel follows the family from the first film as they continue to navigate the post-apocalyptic world infested by the creatures. Cillian Murphy and Djimon Hounsou join the main cast.

=== A Quiet Place: Day One (2024) ===
The spin-off follows a terminally ill woman (Lupita Nyong'o) in New York City during the early stages of the creatures' invasion on Earth. The supporting cast includes Joseph Quinn, Alex Wolff, and Djimon Hounsou, who reprised his role from A Quiet Place Part II.

=== Upcoming ===
==== A Quiet Place Part III ====
In May 2021, Blunt revealed that Krasinski plans for a third and final A Quiet Place film. Acknowledging that he had wanted to see how the second installment was received before moving forward on the next film, he stated it is intended to be a trilogy. In July, Blunt confirmed that Krasinski wrote the script for the film, which is separate from the spin-off. In February 2022, A Quiet Place Part III was officially announced with a scheduled release date in 2025. However, in February 2024, the film no longer had a set release date. In August 2025, the film settled on the release date of July 9, 2027, with Krasinski announced to write, direct, and produce. In March 2026, the cast was announced, with Emily Blunt, Cillian Murphy, Millicent Simmonds and Noah Jupe returning, alongside new cast members including Jack O'Connell, Jason Clarke, and Katy O'Brian. The film was also pushed back to July 30, 2027.

== Production ==
=== A Quiet Place ===
Scott Beck and Bryan Woods wrote A Quiet Place based on a concept they conceived in college. When they first spoke with Platinum Dunes about the project, the two said they wanted Blunt for the role of the mother. Platinum Dunes' Michael Bay had a first-look deal with Paramount Pictures and showed their script to the studio, which bought it. Platinum Dunes producers Andrew Form and Brad Fuller sent the script to Krasinski to play the role of the father. The concept of parents protecting their children appealed to Kransinski. After reading the script, he pitched his vision of the story to Blunt, who suggested he direct the film. When he co-wrote the script, he had Blunt in mind for the role, but did not ask her to do it as she had just had a child, was working on another film, and he was concerned that she would either decline it or accept it to support him. "I just thought if she does this, she has to come to it on her own." Blunt initially did not want to be cast, but after reading Krasinski's script on a plane flight she felt she needed to do it as the story "represented some of my deepest fears—of not being able to protect my children." After finishing his script, Krasinski pitched to Paramount his vision for the film.

Beck and Woods said that Krasinski taking over the film as director "wasn't about reshaping it in any massive way" and that he "really protected our vision of the script". Krasinski said that their script differed from his "in a bunch of little ways, but the heart was all theirs. They really had this thing that I wanted to be a part of." He focused on the idea of family being the core of the story, "so every scare has to be because you love this family, every detail has to become a detail that says something about this family not just to be cool, not just to be scary." His contributions to the screenplay included the use of sign language, sand paths, the lights, and the walk to the forest and the pharmacy. The idea for sign language came about when, prior to filming, deaf actress Simmonds showed Krasinski the American Sign Language (ASL) translation for a scene's dialogue, and he found her gestures to be "so much more cinematic than saying the words would've been". Blunt contributed to the pre-production stage of the film. Most of the directing Krasinski did with her role was off-screen from the moment she accepted the project. Blunt offered ideas, and the two worked through the script and discussed the shots for the film before it went into production. By the time they got on set they had "done all the collaborating ... all the hard work."

The film was produced on a budget of $17 million, and shot in 36 days. Production took place from May to November 2017 in Dutchess and Ulster counties in upstate New York. During filming, the crew avoided making noise so diegetic sounds (e.g., the sound of rolling dice on a game board) could be recorded; the sounds were amplified in post-production. The musical score was used with the intention of not dominating the film but providing a more familiar cinematic experience to audiences, so they did not feel like they were part of a "silence experiment". For the creatures' behavior, Aadahl and Van der Ryn said they were inspired by animal echolocation, such as that employed by bats. The sound of feedback, normally avoided by sound editors, was woven into the story at a loudness level that would not bother audiences too much.

The filmmakers hired deaf mentor Douglas Ridloff to teach ASL to the actors and to be available to make corrections. They also hired an ASL interpreter for Simmonds, so that spoken and signed language could be interpreted back and forth on set. Simmonds also helped teach her fellow actors to sign. Producers Andrew Form and Bradley Fuller said that they initially planned not to provide on-screen subtitles for sign-language dialogue while providing only "context clues", but they realized that subtitles were necessary for the scene in which the deaf daughter and her hearing father argue about the modified hearing aid. They subsequently added subtitles for all sign-language dialogue in the film.

=== A Quiet Place Part II ===
In April 2018, Paramount chair and CEO Jim Gianopulos announced that a sequel was in development. Krasinski said he had considered the first film "a one-off". Uncertain of finding similar success in a sequel, he initially told Paramount to seek another writer and director. The first film's screenwriters Scott Beck and Bryan Woods did not return for the sequel. Woods said they were not interested in a franchise approach and that they would rather try "to create original ideas" and use their writing credits "as an opportunity to push several projects". Beck said, "Instead of focusing on sequels per se, it's about investing back into the ecosystem of original ideas in a massive marketplace."

According to Krasinski, Paramount rejected pitches from other writers and directors that were considered too franchise-oriented. He said, "I had this small idea, which was to make Millie [Simmonds] the lead of the movie... her character opens the door to all the themes I was dealing with in the first movie." The studio invited him to write a script based on his idea. Krasinski decided to write and direct the film. Actors Emily Blunt, Millicent Simmonds, and Noah Jupe reprised their roles from the first film, and Cillian Murphy and Djimon Hounsou joined the cast.

Production took place from June 2019 to late September in New York.

=== A Quiet Place: Day One ===
In November 2020, it was announced that a spin-off prequel film was in development, with Jeff Nichols set to serve as writer and director, based on a story from John Krasinski. The project is a joint-venture production between Platinum Dunes and Sunday Night Productions, with Michael Bay, Andrew Form, Brad Fuller, and Krasinski producing. In May 2021, Krasinski announced that Nichols' script was complete and submitted to the studio. By October, however, Nichols had stepped down as director, citing creative differences. In January 2022, Michael Sarnoski signed on as director and writer. In April 2022 at CinemaCon, the film's title was officially announced as A Quiet Place: Day One. Principal photography began on January 2, 2023, in London, England.

The film was released on June 28, 2024.

== Release and reception ==
A Quiet Place premiered at South by Southwest on March 9, 2018, and was released in the United States on April 6, 2018, by Paramount Pictures. It grossed over $340 million worldwide, and received critical acclaim for its atmosphere, direction, acting, and sound design. It was described as a "smart, wickedly frightening good time", and chosen by both the National Board of Review and American Film Institute as one of the top ten films of 2018.

A Quiet Place Part II had its world premiere at the Lincoln Center in New York City on March 8, 2020. Paramount Pictures originally set its theatrical release date for March 20, 2020, but postponed it to September 4, 2020 due to the COVID-19 pandemic. It was then postponed for April 23, 2021. The film was again delayed to September 17, 2021, and then moved earlier to its final release date of May 28, 2021.

=== Critical response ===
Film	Rotten Tomatoes	Metacritic	CinemaScore
A Quiet Place	96% (387 reviews)	82/100 (55 reviews)	B+
A Quiet Place Part II	91% (368 reviews)	71/100 (57 reviews)	A−
A Quiet Place: Day One	86% (288 reviews)	68/100 (53 reviews)	B+

=== Box office performance ===
Film	Box office gross			Budget	Ref.
Film	North America	Other territories	Worldwide	Budget	Ref.
A Quiet Place	$188,024,361	$152,928,610	$340,955,294	$17 million	
A Quiet Place Part II	$160,072,261	$137,300,000	$297,372,261	$61 million	
A Quiet Place: Day One	$139,051,884	$122,855,769	$261,907,653	$67 million	
Totals	$487,148,506	$413,084,379	$900,235,208	$145 million	

== Cast and characters ==
Character
Character	A Quiet Place	A Quiet Place Part II	A Quiet Place: Day One	A Quiet Place Part III
Character	2018	2020	2024	2027
Evelyn Abbott	Emily Blunt	Emily Blunt		Emily Blunt
Regan Abbott	Millicent Simmonds	Millicent Simmonds		Millicent Simmonds
Marcus Abbott	Noah Jupe	Noah Jupe		Noah Jupe
Lee Abbott	John Krasinski	John Krasinski		TBA
Beau Abbott	Cade Woodward	Dean Woodward		TBA
Man in the Woods	Leon Russom			
Emmett		Cillian Murphy		Cillian Murphy
Henri the Man on the Island		Djimon Hounsou	Djimon Hounsou	
Marina Man		Scoot McNairy		
Roger		Wayne Duvall		
Ronnie		Okieriete Onaodowan		
Samira / Sam			Lupita Nyong'o	
Eric			Joseph Quinn	
Reuben			Alex Wolff	Alex Wolff
Zena			Eliane Umuhire	
Frodo			Nico Schnitzel	
TBA				Jack O'Connell
TBA				Katy O'Brian
TBA				Jason Clarke

== Other media ==
=== Video game ===
A Quiet Place: The Road Ahead, a video game featuring an original story set in the world of the film series, was released on October 17, 2024. It was published by Saber Interactive, and created in collaboration by iLLOGIKA, EP1T0ME Studios, and Paramount Pictures Corporation. The developers stated: "The A Quiet Place video game will let fans experience the tension of the films with a level of immersion they've never felt before." In June 2024, the game's official webpage was launched.

=== Halloween-themed event ===
The franchise was adapted as one of the haunted houses for Universal's Halloween Horror Nights 2024.

=== Comic ===
In October 2024, it was announced that A Quiet Place: Storm Warning, a comic series from IDW Dark set in the A Quiet Place universe, was in the works. In October 2025, it was announced that the series would debut in March 2026.
