= A Quiet Place: The Road Ahead =

2024 video game

- Developer: Stormind Games
- Publisher: Saber Interactive
- Composer: Gianni Ricciardi
- Platforms: Microsoft Windows; PlayStation 5; Xbox Series X/S
- Release: October 17, 2024
- Genre: Survival horror
- Mode: Single-player

A Quiet Place: The Road Ahead is a 2024 survival horror game developed by Stormind Games and published by Saber Interactive for Microsoft Windows, PlayStation 5, and Xbox Series X/S. The game is based on the A Quiet Place film series and features an original story. It was released on October 17, 2024 to mediocre reviews from critics and fans alike.

== Gameplay ==
A Quiet Place: The Road Ahead is a single-player game with gameplay that focuses on stealth and survival horror. The player controls a character from a first-person perspective and must navigate a post-apocalyptic world inhabited by blind hostile extraterrestrial creatures with enhanced hypersensitive hearing (known unofficially as "Death Angels"). The game has a variety of features, including microphone options that allow in-game monsters to detect the player's presence if they make a sound in real life and informs the player of sound levels.

== Synopsis ==
=== Setting and characters ===
The story takes place between the events of A Quiet Place: Day One and the first film and features Alex Taylor (voiced by Anairis Quiñones), an asthmatic college student survivor in a post-apocalyptic world who, alongside her boyfriend, Martin, is threatened by alien creatures named Death Angels. After Martin's death, Alex must rely on her own strength to remain alive while pregnant with Martin's child.

=== Story ===
Alex and Martin arrive at a ranch, looking for food and medical supplies to bring back to the hospital they are taking shelter in. During the search a nauseous Alex finds a pregnancy test and takes it, revealing she's pregnant with Martin's child. The two stay the night at the ranch. In the morning while leaving Alex gets her foot caught in a log and Martin chooses to sacrifice his life to let her escape.

Arriving back at the hospital, Alex's father Kenneth learns that she's pregnant and the two plan to leave. However, Martin's mother Laura also learns this and locks Alex in a room. With Kenneth's help, Alex manages to escape, but an argument between Laura and Kenneth attracts the Death Angels and forces the entire hospital to evacuate.

Alex meets back up with Kenneth at an abandoned camp. The two find a damaged radio, and Alex gets the parts needed to repair it. From the radio, they learn the Death Angels can't swim and that there is an island with people and no Death Angels on it. The two make a plan to get a boat, but Laura shows up and holds Kenneth hostage looking for information on where Alex is. In the ensuing struggle, Laura accidentally shoots and kills Kenneth. Alex manages to escape and takes cover overnight under a waterfall.

The next day, Alex resolves to get into town and on the boat on her own. While there, she discovers only one boat left in a fire station. While putting fuses in a box, an electrical short starts a fire in the fire station. The smoke knocks Alex out, but Laura drags her to safety and gives her a gas mask so she can get to the boat safely. Alex then leaves to turn on the nearby lighthouse to distract the Death Angels, allowing her to reach the boat and escape. The following morning, she hears a voice on the radio asking if anyone is alive, to which Alex responds that she is.

== Development ==
In October 2021, it was announced that a video game set within the same continuity as the A Quiet Place film series was in development. The game would reportedly include an original story. The project, set to be published by Saber Interactive, was being developed by Canadian studio iLLOGIKA. In June 2024, it was reported that Italian studio Stormind Games was now the developer of the game.

=== Release ===
The game was announced in October 2021. Along with a title announcement, a trailer was released in June 2024. A Quiet Place: The Road Ahead released on Microsoft Windows, PlayStation 5, and Xbox Series X/S on October 17, 2024.

== Reception ==
The game received "mixed or average" reviews according to the review aggregation website Metacritic. Fellow review aggregator OpenCritic assessed that the game received fair approval, being recommended by 41% of critics.
