= A Quiet Place Part III =

Upcoming American horror film by John Krasinski

- Directed by: John Krasinski
- Written by: John Krasinski
- Based on: Characters by Bryan Woods and Scott Beck
- Produced by: John Krasinski; Michael Bay; Andrew Form; Brad Fuller
- Starring: Emily Blunt; Cillian Murphy; Millicent Simmonds; Noah Jupe; Jack O'Connell; Katy O'Brian; Jason Clarke
- Cinematography: Arnau Valls Colomer
- Production companies: Platinum Dunes; Sunday Night Productions
- Distributed by: Paramount Pictures
- Release date: July 30, 2027
- Country: United States
- Language: English

A Quiet Place Part III is an upcoming American post-apocalyptic horror film written and directed by John Krasinski. The fourth installment in the A Quiet Place film series, the film is the sequel to A Quiet Place Part II (2020), serving as the third and final film in a trilogy that began with A Quiet Place (2018). Emily Blunt, Cillian Murphy, Millicent Simmonds, and Noah Jupe reprise their roles from Part II, with Jack O'Connell, Katy O'Brian, and Jason Clarke joining the cast.

A Quiet Place Part III is scheduled to be released in the United States by Paramount Pictures on July 30, 2027.

== Cast ==
- Emily Blunt as Evelyn Abbott, a recently widowed mother who leads her family to search for other people
- Cillian Murphy as Emmett, a close family friend of the Abbotts who is a hardened, reclusive survivor
- Millicent Simmonds as Regan Abbott, Evelyn's deaf daughter
- Noah Jupe as Marcus Abbott, Evelyn's son
- Jack O'Connell as a National Guardsman and Emmett’s brother
- Katy O'Brian
- Jason Clarke
- Alex Wolff as Reuben, a hospice nurse who died in New York City when the Death Angels invaded

== Production ==
In May 2021, Emily Blunt revealed that her husband John Krasinski (co-star, co-writer, director, and co-producer for the series) had plans for a third A Quiet Place film. Acknowledging that he had wanted to see how A Quiet Place Part II (2020) was received before moving forward on the next film, she stated that the Quiet Place films are intended to be a trilogy. In July 2021, Blunt confirmed that Krasinski was working on a third installment, separate from the spin-off film A Quiet Place: Day One (2024), with intentions to once again direct. He was confirmed to be directing, writing, and co-producing in August 2025. In March 2026, the cast was revealed. In May 2026, it was revealed that Alex Wolff would reprise his role from A Quiet Place: Day One.

Principal photography began on May 10, 2026, with Arnau Valls Colomer as cinematographer. By June 9, Murphy, Simmonds, O'Connell, and Clarke were filming their scenes but Blunt had yet to start due to back-to-back press tours for The Devil Wears Prada 2 and Disclosure Day.

Based on published casting calls for military and post-apocalyptic refugee roles, and the establishment of a temporary basecamp nearby, it is likely the Battleship New Jersey museum ship in Camden, New Jersey was used as a filming location as the fictional USS Dover during the museum closure in late May to early June 2026. Facebook user "SV First Light" uploaded video of a black helicopter landing on the museum ship's flight deck, while many uniformed extras could be seen on deck and a floating refugee camp could be seen in the river next to the ship.

== Release ==
A Quiet Place Part III is scheduled to be released in the United States by Paramount Pictures on July 30, 2027. It was previously scheduled to release on July 9, 2027.
