= Death Angels (A Quiet Place) =

Fictional alien species

- A Quiet Place race
- The design of the Death Angels
- First appearance: A Quiet Place
- Created by: Scott Beck; Bryan Woods; John Krasinski

A fictional alien species, known unofficially as Death Angels or Happy, are the main antagonists of the A Quiet Place science fiction horror franchise. They are a species of sound-hunting predators that arrived on Earth inside a meteor and are driven by an instinct to kill any life that makes noise.

== Name ==
The creatures in the A Quiet Place horror franchise have no given name in the films or related media. In official merchandise, such as a Funko figurine, they are simply referred to as "Monsters". However, the species are referred to as "Death Angels" among fans based on a moniker given to them in a newspaper clipping seen in the first film. Additionally, the creatures are referred to as "Happy" internally by Malcolm Humphreys and the Industrial Light & Magic visual effects team working on the franchise; the nickname was chosen as an ironic contrast to their viciousness in the films.

== Development ==
John Krasinski, the director and co-writer of A Quiet Place, stated that the aliens in the film were designed to evoke an invasive species. He stated that they were conceived not as invaders with an agenda to take over the world, as is common in science fiction, but as an "evolutionarily perfect" predator unleashed into a new ecosystem. He compared their impact on the ecosystems and people of Earth to "releasing wolves into a day care center". He also stated that they were partially inspired by the film RocknRolla, in which a story is told about invasive American crawfish in the River Thames that have eaten the native fauna.

The aliens were given a backstory in development, although it is never portrayed in the films. According to Krasinski, they originate on a planet with no light, which caused them to evolve to hunt by sound alone. Owing to their powerful natural armor, the creatures survived the explosion of their own planet and lived on asteroids before reaching Earth. Krasinski stated that the creatures are completely invulnerable except for when they open their protective armor plates.

The aliens originally had a different design during the production of A Quiet Place. The initial design had a rigid exoskeleton and large horns inspired by fish fossils and nautilus shells. However, Krasinski was unsatisfied with the design. In redesigning the creature, inspiration was taken from bog bodies, human corpses preserved in bogs with tanned, sagging skin. Production designer Jeffrey Beecroft said that the new design was intended to be "gross" and to look "medical and raw".

== Appearances ==
=== Films ===
Set several years after the arrival of the Death Angels to Earth, the franchise's first film establishes the creatures as the primary antagonists. They have killed most humans and destroyed almost all governments, leaving the planet's remaining inhabitants in a silent, post-apocalyptic survival situation. The film establishes that they hunt by sound, and that all remaining humans keep quiet to survive. Owing to the Death Angels' powerful hearing, humans can only speak safely in loud environments, such as near waterfalls that drown out their voices. Additionally, the Death Angels can be incapacitated and even killed by shrill noises, which send them into spasms that expose the weak flesh underneath their armor. They are unable to swim so they easily drown in deep water thus the reason for humanity's survival on islands. They are able to hear human heartbeats in some circumstances, but in most cases the sound is drowned out by environmental ambient noise.

The aliens do not eat humans due to their incompatible biology, and several old human corpses are seen throughout the film. Instead, the creatures instinctively hunt and silence any loud noise.

The second film establishes that human survivors have established colonies on islands because the aliens cannot swim. In this film, survivors use sonic frequencies to combat them.

Serving as a prequel to the previous two films, A Quiet Place: Day One depicts the arrival of the Death Angels on Earth. They are revealed to be led by a larger, more muscular Death Angel variant, and are shown to farm and feed on an alien fungus that arrived with them on Earth. Director Michael Sarnoski said that the reason they kill humans at all is to use the corpses to grow their crops.

=== Other media ===
The Death Angels appear as the villains in the 2024 video game A Quiet Place: The Road Ahead, set between Day One and the first film. The game makes use of their enhanced hearing abilities through a microphone, allowing the creatures to hear noises made by the player in the real world.

== Reception ==
The Death Angels have been visually compared to various other creatures from science fiction and horror media, including the Demogorgon from Stranger Things, the alien bugs from Starship Troopers, Clover from Cloverfield, and the future predator from Primeval.
