= A Quiet Place: Storm Warning =

2026 comic book series

- Cover art for issue #1.

Publication information
- Publisher: IDW Publishing
- Genre: Apocalyptic and post-apocalyptic horror
- Publication date: March 11, 2026 — present
- Main character: A Quiet Place (Paramount Pictures)

Creative team
- Written by: Phil Hester
- Artist: Ryan Kelly
- Penciller: Ryan Kelly
- Inker: Ryan Kelly
- Letterer: Nathan Widick
- Colorist: Lee Loughridge
- Editor: Heather Antos

A Quiet Place: Storm Warning is an American apocalyptic and post-apocalyptic horror limited comic book series that is being published by IDW Publishing since March 2026.

== Development ==
In October 2024, it was announced that A Quiet Place: Storm Warning, a comic series from IDW Dark set in the A Quiet Place universe, was in the works. In October 2025, its March 2026 release date was announced.

== Synopsis ==
The series is set in Pearl, Iowa and follows various characters including Lonnie Fry, the fire chief of Pearl, and his family. The story is set to include the characters dealing with flood waters as well as attempting to stay silent to evade alien foes.

=== Main characters ===
- Lonnie Fry: Fire chief of Pearl, Iowa.
- Terri Phair: Mayor of Pearl, Iowa.
- Gloria Fry
- Brody Fry
- Mia Fry
- Caleb
- Clem

== Issues ==
Issue #	Title	Written by	Drawn by	Colored by	Lettered by	Publication date
1	A Quiet Place: Storm Warning #1	Ryan Kelly	Phil Hester	Lee Loughridge	Nathan Widick	March 11, 2026
2	A Quiet Place: Storm Warning #2	TBA	Phil Hester	Lee Loughridge	TBA	April 29, 2026
3	A Quiet Place: Storm Warning #3	TBA	Phil Hester	Lee Loughridge	TBA	May 27, 2026
4	A Quiet Place: Storm Warning #4	TBA	Phil Hester	Lee Loughridge	TBA	June 24, 2026
5	A Quiet Place: Storm Warning #5	TBA	Phil Hester	Lee Loughridge	TBA	July 22, 2026
