= Jeffrey Beecroft =

American production designer

- Born: April 1, 1956 (age 70); Sacramento, California, United States
- Occupation: Production designer
- Years active: 1985-present

Jeffrey Beecroft (born April 1, 1956) is an American production designer. He was nominated for an Academy Award in the category Best Art Direction for the film Dances with Wolves. He has received 7 ADG nominations and 3 wins.

== Selected filmography ==
- Dances with Wolves (1990)
- The Bodyguard (1992)
- 12 Monkeys (1995)
- The Game (1997)
- Message in a Bottle (1999)
- Pain & Gain (2013)
- Transformers: Age of Extinction (2014)
- 13 Hours: The Secret Soldiers of Benghazi (2016)
- Transformers: The Last Knight (2017)
- A Quiet Place (2018)
- 6 Underground (2019)
