= A Quiet Place Part II =

2020 film by John Krasinski

- Theatrical release poster
- Directed by: John Krasinski
- Written by: John Krasinski
- Based on: Characters by Bryan Woods and Scott Beck
- Produced by: Michael Bay; Andrew Form; Brad Fuller; John Krasinski
- Starring: Emily Blunt; Cillian Murphy; Millicent Simmonds; Noah Jupe; Djimon Hounsou; John Krasinski
- Cinematography: Polly Morgan
- Edited by: Michael P. Shawver
- Music by: Marco Beltrami
- Production companies: Paramount Pictures; Platinum Dunes; Sunday Night Productions
- Distributed by: Paramount Pictures
- Release dates: March 8, 2020 (New York City); May 28, 2021 (United States)
- Running time: 97 minutes
- Country: United States
- Languages: American Sign Language; English
- Budget: $55–61 million
- Box office: $297.5 million

A Quiet Place Part II is a 2020 American post-apocalyptic horror film written, directed, and co-produced by John Krasinski. It is the sequel to A Quiet Place (2018), following the family from the film as they continue to navigate a post-apocalyptic world inhabited by blind aliens with an acute sense of hearing. Emily Blunt, Millicent Simmonds, Noah Jupe, and Krasinski reprise their roles from the first film, while Cillian Murphy and Djimon Hounsou join the cast.

Paramount Pictures began developing a sequel in April 2018, following the box-office success of A Quiet Place. By August, Krasinski was working on the screenplay, and in February 2019, he was confirmed as returning to direct. Krasinski's starting idea was making Simmonds the lead, as he considered her character the conduit for the themes from the first film that he wanted to expand on in the sequel. Production took place in Western New York from June to September 2019. Krasinski was credited with writing the sequel, based on characters created by Scott Beck and Bryan Woods. The sequel was produced on a budget of around $55–61 million, over three times the original's $17 million.

A Quiet Place Part II had its world premiere in New York City on March 8, 2020. After over a year of postponements due to the COVID-19 pandemic, it was theatrically released in the United States on May 28, 2021. It became available to stream on Paramount+ 45 days after its theatrical debut. The film set several box office records, including the biggest opening weekend during the course of the pandemic, and grossed $297.5 million worldwide. It received positive reviews from critics, who praised the story and the addition of Murphy's character Emmett. A Quiet Place Part III, the third and final film following the original film's family, is scheduled to be released on July 30, 2027.

== Plot ==
In the small town of Millbrook, New York, the Abbott family — parents Evelyn and Lee, daughter Regan, who is deaf, and sons Marcus and Beau — attend a Little League baseball game. A meteor-like object is seen hurtling toward Earth. Soon after, hostile alien creatures emerge and begin attacking. The blind creatures possess armored skin, incredible speed and strength, and an acute sense of hearing, attacking anything that makes noise.

Over a year later, the aliens have killed much of Earth's population, including Lee and Beau. (Note: As depicted in A Quiet Place (2018)) Regan discovers that high-frequency audio disrupts the aliens and modifies her cochlear implant to emit the signal via a handheld microphone. With their home destroyed, the surviving Abbotts set out in search of other survivors. While entering a fenced-off area, Evelyn accidentally activates a sound alarm. Marcus steps into a bear trap and screams, attracting an alien. Regan and Evelyn kill it, free Marcus, and take shelter in an abandoned steel foundry.

They encounter Emmett, a former friend who has lost his family and lives alone in a soundproof bunker. He reluctantly allows them to stay but refuses further help. Marcus hears the song "Beyond the Sea" playing repeatedly on a radio station. Regan interprets the signal as a message from survivors living on the nearby Norwalk Islands. She theorizes that if she can reach the island's radio tower, she can broadcast the high-frequency signal as a weapon. Regan sets out alone but is attacked by an alien. Emmett rescues her and eventually agrees to help complete her mission.

Evelyn leaves the foundry to retrieve medical supplies, leaving Marcus and the baby behind. While exploring, Marcus finds the decaying body of Emmett's wife. Startled, he makes noise, drawing an alien. He hides with the baby inside an air-tight compartment, risking suffocation.

Emmett and Regan reach a marina, where they are ambushed by hostile looters. Emmett intentionally draws aliens to the scene, which kill the attackers. One creature drowns, revealing that the aliens cannot swim. Emmett and Regan escape in a boat and reach the island, where a small colony of survivors lives in relative safety. The colony's leader explains that when the U.S. government discovered the creatures could not swim, the National Guard attempted evacuations to the islands. However, chaos during boarding attracted the aliens, and only two of twelve boats made it.

Meanwhile, Evelyn returns to the foundry and rescues Marcus and the baby. The family hides in the bunker as an alien enters the facility. The next day, an alien reaches the island on a drifting boat and attacks the colonists, killing the leader. Regan and Emmett flee to the island's radio station. Regan transmits the high-frequency signal over the radio, incapacitating the alien, then kills it using a metal rod.

Back at the foundry, Marcus hears the broadcast and plays the signal through a portable radio, weakening the alien inside before shooting it. Regan leaves her cochlear implant connected to the radio station microphone, enabling the signal to be broadcast for use by other survivors.

== Cast ==
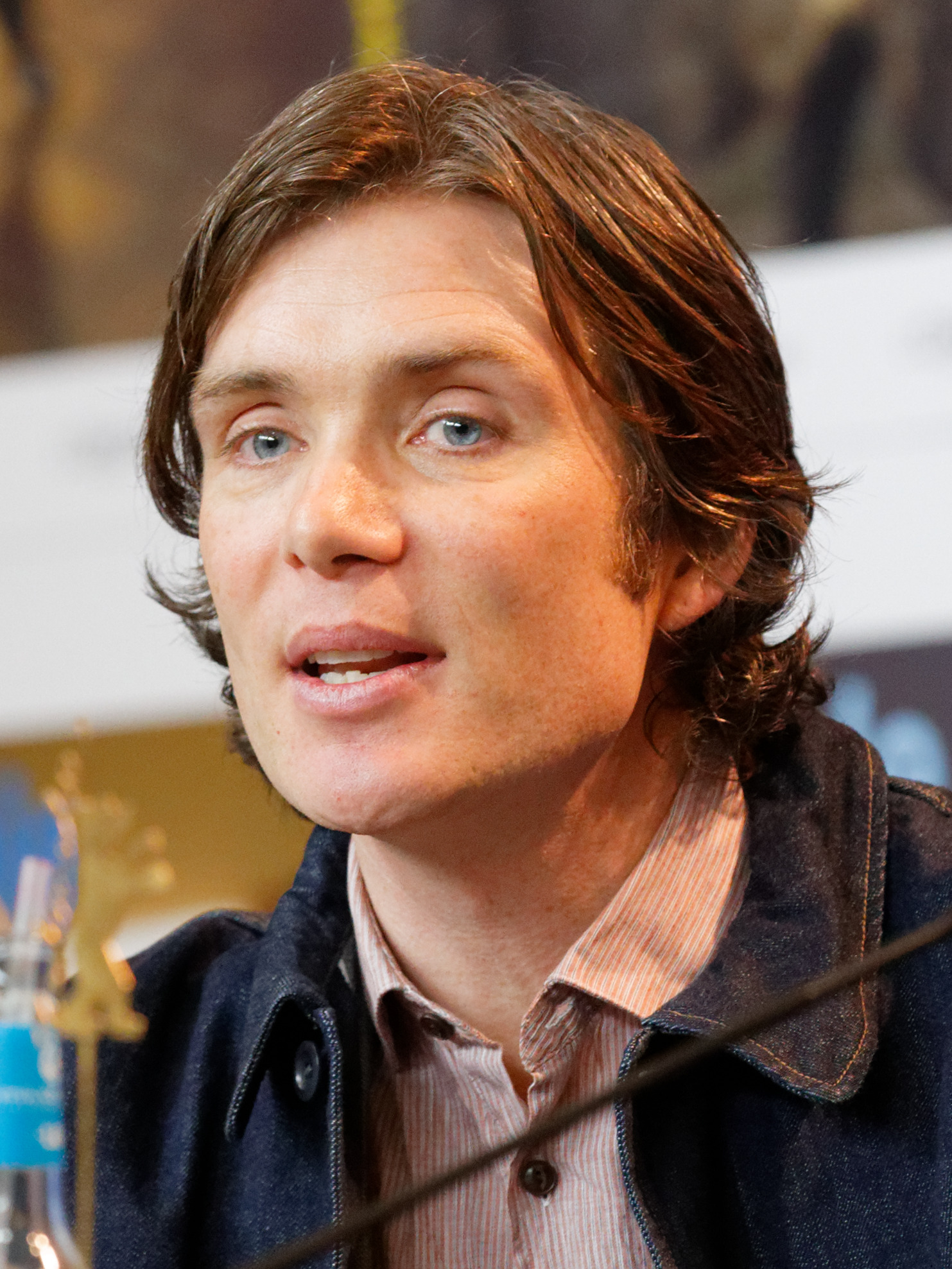
Cillian Murphy joined the cast as Emmett

- Emily Blunt as Evelyn Abbott, a recently-widowed mother who leads her family to search for other people.
- Cillian Murphy as Emmett, a friend of Lee's who is a hardened, reclusive survivor.
- Millicent Simmonds as Regan Abbott, Evelyn's deaf daughter.
- Noah Jupe as Marcus Abbott, Evelyn's son.
- Djimon Hounsou as the Man on the Island, the leader of an island colony of survivors. (Note: Character's name is revealed to be Henri in A Quiet Place: Day One.)
- John Krasinski as Lee Abbott, Evelyn's deceased husband and father of her children.
- Scoot McNairy as Marina Man, who leads a group of bandits that prey on travelers trying to reach the nearby island.
- Alice Sophie Malyukova as Girl at Marina, a member of the bandits
- Dean Woodward as Beau Abbott, Evelyn's deceased son. He was portrayed by Cade Woodward, who is Dean's real-life older brother, in the first film.
- Okieriete Onaodowan as Ronnie, a police officer.
- Zachary Golinger as Emmett's young son.
- Lauren Ashley Cristiano as Emmett's deceased wife.
- Wayne Duvall as Roger, a grocery store owner.
- Barbara Singer as Woman in Store, an elderly woman at Roger's grocery store.

== Production ==
A Quiet Place Part II was produced under Paramount Pictures with a budget of $61 million. It was written and directed by John Krasinski, who also produced the film alongside Michael Bay, Andrew Form, and Brad Fuller.

=== Development and casting ===
Paramount produced the first film, A Quiet Place, on a budget of $17 million. The studio released the film in the United States and Canada in April 2018, where it grossed $50.2 million on opening weekend, well above a mid-$20 million forecast. Later in April, Paramount Chair and CEO Jim Gianopulos announced that a sequel was in development. The first film totaled $188 million in the US and Canada and $340.9 million worldwide. John Krasinski, who co-wrote, directed and starred in the first film, said he considered it "as a one-off". Uncertain of finding similar success in a sequel, he initially told Paramount to seek another writer and director. The first film's screenwriters Scott Beck and Bryan Woods did not return for the sequel. Woods said they were not interested in a franchise approach, and that they would rather try "to create original ideas" and use their writing credits "as an opportunity to push several projects." Beck said, "Instead of focusing on sequels per se, it's about investing back into the ecosystem of original ideas in a massive marketplace."

Three months after A Quiet Place's release, Krasinski decided to brainstorm ideas for a sequel. According to Krasinski, Paramount rejected pitches from other writers and directors that were considered too franchise-oriented. He said, "I had this small idea, which was to make Millie [Simmonds] the lead of the movie... her character opens the door to all the themes I was dealing with in the first movie." The studio invited him to write a script based on his idea. By August 2018, Krasinski was writing the film. He wrote a draft in three and a half weeks.

In the following February, he was confirmed to direct the sequel, and actors Emily Blunt, Millicent Simmonds, and Noah Jupe were set to reprise their roles. In March, Cillian Murphy joined the cast. Murphy described his character as such, "For me, Emmett represents where the heart of the world lies right now, which is: finally feeling like they've all given up. Here comes this girl [Regan] who allows you to believe in more, and allows you to believe in yourself. That idea, I've always been really enthralled by." In the following June, Brian Tyree Henry was also added, but later left the film due to scheduling problems. He was replaced by Djimon Hounsou in August.

Krasinski said he wrote himself into the sequel because the first film "was such a personal experience" and his "love letter" to his children. He said, "It was really important for me to continue the metaphor and we actually start dealing with how this all started." Simmonds, who is deaf in real life, described her character's evolution after the first film, "She has a lot of pressure to become an adult very quickly." Simmonds has a more prominent role in the sequel, and according to Syfy Wire, deafness and American Sign Language "are inherently linked to the heroism of its heroine." Simmonds worked with an ASL coach to make sure her signing and articulation were clean. She said she felt "a sense of pressure" being in a position to represent the deaf and hard of hearing.

=== Filming ===
In June 2019, production began on the sequel. Filming officially commenced on July 15. There were 47 days of filming throughout Western New York, including Akron, Olcott, Dunkirk, Lackawanna, and Buffalo. Other locations included Erie County and the city of North Tonawanda, and Barcelona Harbor in the town of Westfield in Chautauqua County. Filming also took place on a giant sound stage at Buffalo FilmWorks in South Buffalo. An abandoned Bethlehem Steel plant in Lackawanna was used as a filming location. One of the last filming locations, the northbound South Grand Island Bridge, was shut down for 13 hours for filming.

In addition to Western New York, filming took place in the Hudson Valley, specifically the towns of Dover, Pawling, and New Paltz. In New Paltz, the Wallkill Valley Rail Trail was revisited to film on a bridge that was featured in the first film. The production invested over $10 million in Upstate New York, created 400 hires, and involved 300 background actors. By late September, production was finished.

=== Cinematography ===
Polly Morgan was the cinematographer for A Quiet Place Part II, replacing Charlotte Bruus Christensen from the first film. Morgan continued the first film's use of 35 mm film and described its effect, "Although A Quiet Place 2 is a horror, it looks pretty and engaging, with a nostalgic look that you would find hard to achieve digitally." The film's "extensive dark situations" (night scenes and stage work that comprised 75% of screen time) were shot with Kodak Vision3 500T 5219 film stock, while Vision3 250D 5207 was used mainly for day exteriors. Morgan filmed with Panavision Panaflex Millennium XL2 cameras and T-Series anamorphic lenses, which had been adjusted to match the C-Series lenses Christensen used on the first film. One of Morgan's most challenging situations was lighting and shooting the furnace setting.

The sequel's cinematography also evolved from its predecessor in following more action. Morgan described director Krasinski's intent, "John wanted to always keep the camera moving and create long 'oners' to play with rhythm and tension and to show how normal life can suddenly become very different and dangerous—all in the same shot." Morgan used an array of tracking vehicles, on which there were different camera mounts including jibs, cranes, and Steadicam vests, with the vehicles often going full speed.

=== Sound design ===
For the sequel's sound design, supervising sound editors Erik Aadahl and Ethan Van der Ryn and re-recording mixer Brandon Proctor returned for the film. Krasinski instructed them to try to "follow the rules" set up in the first film and said of the experience, "What we found was by doing that, and not trying to be cool, we ended up uncovering way more stuff than we ever would've been able to [otherwise]."

In an interview with Headliner Magazine, Ethan Van der Ryn and Erik Aadahl shared how sound (and silence) was a central character in the film: "We started hearing stories after the first film that people were afraid to eat their popcorn in the theatre! That was thrilling for us to hear because it's like, 'Okay, this experiment that we tried actually works'! We were able to literally make the audience hold their breath."

== Marketing ==
When Paramount Pictures planned to commercially release A Quiet Place Part II in March 2020, the studio released a 30-second teaser trailer before select theatrical screenings of Black Christmas, which was released on December 13, 2019. Less than a week later, the teaser trailer became available online. A full trailer was released on January 1, 2020. During pre-game coverage before the Super Bowl on February 2, 2020, Paramount released a 30-second TV spot, which revealed that Krasinski had reprised his role in a newly filmed flashback sequence.

In early March, Paramount initiated "survival room" experiences in New York and Los Angeles in which groups of visitors could try to overcome "physical and mental obstacles" without making too much noise. The setups cost less than a million dollars for Paramount. A marketing executive anticipated between seven thousand and eight thousand people to go through the experience and for fans and social media influencers to engage in experiential marketing. Emily Blunt appeared on Jimmy Kimmel Live! on March 10 to promote the film. She appeared in a parody commercial advertising A Quiet Plane, starring as a stewardess that enforces silence as a top priority to a plane's passengers. Before the film's postponement (see below), Paramount planned to host a double-feature event on March 18, 2020, that would have screened the first and second films and given collector's prints to attendees.

Following the postponement of A Quiet Place Part II and other films during the start of the COVID-19 pandemic, teleconferencing became popular, and Paramount's marketing team started providing virtual backgrounds of A Quiet Place Part II and other films to be available on Zoom Video Communications.

For the film's eventual May 2021 release date, Paramount released a final trailer several weeks in advance. The A.V. Club's William Hughes wrote that the new trailer was a retread of previous trailers with the most noteworthy element being its message that the film was the "experience that theaters are made for", encouraging increasingly-vaccinated moviegoers during the pandemic to go to movie theaters.

== Release ==
A Quiet Place Part II had its world premiere at the Lincoln Center in New York City on March 8, 2020. Paramount Pictures released the film in theaters on May 28, 2021 after a year's worth of delays due to the COVID-19 pandemic. The New York Times described it as "one of the first major films to receive an exclusive theatrical release from a Hollywood studio in the not-quite-post-coronavirus era." The studio released the film on Paramount+ 45 days after its theatrical release.

Originally set for May 15, 2020 and March 20, 2020, as the pandemic case numbers had begun to rise in mid March, Paramount postponed it to September 4, 2020. Without a streaming service from 2020 to early 2021, Paramount auctioned off multiple upcoming feature films but decided to keep A Quiet Place Part II. The studio eventually changed the date to April 23, 2021, then, September 17, 2021 before moving it to May 28, 2021.

=== Postponement ===
The studio initially planned to release the film in theaters globally starting on March 18, 2020, before it delayed the film due to the pandemic. Paramount had already spent around 60% of its budget for global prints and advertising, and Deadline Hollywood wrote that the film's delay was "truly a shocker" because the P&A expenses seemed to indicate that rescheduling was not an option. The studio films slated for the previous weekend, March 13, were the last to be released before mass theater closures. Director John Krasinski said he wanted moviegoers to see the film together and that with the pandemic, it was not the right time to provide that experience. CNBC wrote that in particular, the film and In the Heights were considered films best experienced with a crowd.

The film was initially to be released in the United Kingdom and Australia on March 19, 2020, and in the United States and Canada, including Dolby Cinema and IMAX, on March 20, 2020. Paramount initially stated on March 6 that it would not reschedule the film in response to the pandemic, but on March 12, the studio pulled the film from release worldwide with the intent of scheduling it later in the year. In April 2020, it announced the release date of September 4, 2020. The September release date would have been the start of the US holiday Labor Day Weekend. Deadline Hollywood wrote at the time that the weekend is "summer [box office's] finale", and "typically the deadest period ever for moviegoing", but that the studio anticipated pent-up demand after pandemic fears subside.

In July 2020, Paramount changed the film's release date from September 4, 2020 to April 23, 2021. At the time of the announcement, movie theaters in the United States and Canada had been closed for nearly four months, and the pandemic was continuing to spread across the United States. The second postponement followed other studios' decisions at the time to indefinitely delay the Warner Bros. film Tenet and the Disney film Mulan. Variety reported, "While those films had been long positioned to help revive moviegoing, sources say that Paramount did not want A Quiet Place Part 2 to stay on Labor Day weekend and have the pressure of being the first new movie out of the gate during the pandemic."

In January 2021, Paramount postponed the film's release from April 23, 2021 to September 17, 2021. At the time of postponement, COVID-19 infections had surged in the United States in recent months. Variety wrote of the circumstances in the United States and Canada, "Around 65% of movie theaters remain closed, and cinemas that have stayed open have struggled to sell tickets." The postponement followed other studios' postponing of their films No Time to Die, Ghostbusters: Afterlife, Morbius, Cinderella, and The King's Man. On the September 2021 date at the time, A Quiet Place Part II would have been scheduled to open against Death on the Nile, The Boss Baby: Family Business, and The Man from Toronto, all three of which later had their own dates shifted.

=== Streaming service ===
In February 2021, Paramount announced that A Quiet Place Part II would become available on its streaming service Paramount+ 45 days after its theatrical release. Deadline Hollywood reported that it was "a clear sign that Paramount is committed to theatrical, but still open to the future of streaming." Before the COVID-19 pandemic, movie theater operators sought for films to be theatrically released for 90 days before being released on home media. As a result of the pandemic, Warner Bros. opted to release their 2021 slate of films on HBO Max the same day as in theaters, and Universal Pictures made its films available via video-on-demand 17 days after their theatrical releases. Variety reported, "Paramount's strategy may be received the most favorably among film exhibitors", with A Quiet Place Part II among Paramount's tentpole films having the 45-day frame and its other titles having a 30-day frame. Boxoffice Pro reported that the original film grossed 94% of its total of $188 million in the United States and Canada by its 45th day, which indicated that Paramount's "decision works more in favor of exhibitors than against."

=== Move-up ===
On March 4, 2021, director John Krasinski announced that the release date would be moved to May 28, 2021, which is the start of the Memorial Day holiday weekend in the United States. Boxoffice Pro wrote, "This marks the first time post-pandemic that a theatrically exclusive major studio tentpole has moved a planned release up by this many months rather than back." The publication also wrote that the film would be "the first live-action tentpole exclusively in theaters" since Tenet was released in August 2020.

Earlier in the day of Krasinski's announcement, Universal Pictures had postponed the action film F9 from late May 2021 to June 25, 2021. In the move-up process, Paramount postponed another of its films, Infinite, from the May 28 release date. Deadline Hollywood reported that Paramount was encouraged to release A Quiet Place Part II earlier due to theaters reopening in New York City starting the weekend of March 5, 2021 and with plans for theaters in Los Angeles to also reopen in the near future.

As a result of Paramount shortening the theatrical run from 90 days to 45, John Krasinski, Emily Blunt, and producers including Michael Bay whose compensation depends on box-office receipts, requested for the studio to compensate them for the shorter run.

=== Theatrical release ===
For its theatrical release on May 28, 2021, A Quiet Place Part II was released in 3,752 theaters in the United States and Canada.

The film was also released in 12 other markets on its opening weekend, including China as a last-minute addition.

=== Home media ===
The film was released digitally on July 13, 2021, while 4K Ultra HD, Blu-ray, and DVD on July 27, 2021. It was also released on Paramount+ on July 13, 2021.

== Reception ==
=== Box office ===
A Quiet Place Part II grossed $160.1 million in the United States and Canada, and $137.3 million in other territories, for a worldwide total of $297.4 million.

Before A Quiet Place Part II was postponed from late March 2020 due to the COVID-19 pandemic, Boxoffice Pro predicted the film would gross $72 million on its opening weekend, based on the first film's opening weekend ($50.2 million) and the continued involvement of Emily Blunt and John Krasinski; but noted that the film would face competition from other titles such as Mulan. In February, early industry tracking had the film debuting to around $55–60 million. Deadline Hollywood's Anthony D'Alessandro wrote, "A Quiet Place Part II is currently strong with females under 25, African Americans and Hispanic demos, but overall I hear it's strong with all quads."

For its 2021 theatrical release, Boxoffice Pro forecast that the film would gross between $30 million and $50 million on its opening weekend in the United States and Canada, with a total gross between $75 million and $125 million. IndieWire wrote, "It has a core male audience that skews younger with minority moviegoers, along with strong interest and critical support", and predicted between $40 million and $50 million. According to Fandango, US advance ticket sales were double the sales from the planned March 2020 release and also more than the sales for the first film in 2018. The film made $19.3 million on its first day, including $4.8 million from Thursday night previews, topping the $4.3 million preview figure of the first film; both grosses were the highest of the pandemic. It went on to debut to $48.0 million in its three-day opening weekend and a total of $57.5 million over the four day Memorial Day frame, topping the box office and marking the biggest opening weekend since Sonic the Hedgehog in February 2020. In its sophomore weekend the film grossed $19.5 million, finishing second, behind The Conjuring: The Devil Made Me Do It. The film crossed the $100 million domestic mark on June 11, becoming the first film of the pandemic era to do so. In its third weekend the film regained the top spot, upsetting newcomer In the Heights with $12 million.

=== Critical response ===
A Quiet Place Part II received mostly positive reviews from film critics. Screen Rant wrote that critics liked the film and praised its "two-pronged story" and the introduction of Cillian Murphy's character. The Independent wrote that critics were divided.

On the review aggregator website Rotten Tomatoes, 91% of 366 critics' reviews are positive, with an average rating of 7.5/10. The website's consensus reads: "A nerve-wracking continuation of its predecessor, A Quiet Place Part II expands the terrifying world of the franchise without losing track of its heart." Metacritic, which uses a weighted average, assigned the film a score of 71 out of 100, based on 57 critics, indicating "generally favorable" reviews. Audiences polled by CinemaScore gave the film an average grade of "A−" on an A+ to F scale, an improvement from the first film's B+ score. PostTrak reported 83% of audience members gave it a positive score, with 63% saying they would definitely recommend it.

Peter Bradshaw of The Guardian gave the film 4 stars out of 5, stating, "This sequel from writer-director John Krasinski may not quite have all its focus and intimate horror, while the borrowings from Alien, Jurassic Park and Jaws are admittedly more obvious this time around. But it's a really effective and engrossing followup, with an absolutely sensational "prelude" sequence at the top of the movie, a barnstorming shocker equal to anything in AQP1." He also praised the performances of Millicent Simmonds and Cillian Murphy, stating that "Simmonds is an excellent performer: bold, confident and forthright, holding her own opposite the alpha-emoting presence of Murphy." Jeannette Catsoulis of The New York Times gave the film a positive review, stating, "...while this new installment is, like its predecessor, wonderfully acted and intuitively directed (by John Krasinski, who is solely responsible for the story this time around), it has also largely replaced the hushed horror of the original with full-on action. Faster, coarser and far noisier, Part II sacrifices emotional depth for thriller setups that do less to advance the plot than grow the younger characters", and, "Though in many respects an exemplary piece of filmmaking, Part II remains hobbled by a script that resolves two separate crises while leaving the movie itself in limbo." Justin Chang of NPR said that "A Quiet Place Part II [is] an unexpectedly resonant film for the present moment as this country slowly emerges from a crisis that—while surely less terrifying than an alien apocalypse—has revealed humanity at its best and its worst", and praised Krasinski's direction, saying, "Not being able to fall back on verbal exposition has forced Krasinski to become a ruthlessly efficient visual storyteller. It's often said that Alfred Hitchcock's movies are so sharply directed, you could turn the sound off and still follow the action—a truth that applies to these movies as well."

Bloody Disgusting rated the film 3.5/5 and called it "a satisfying, worthwhile sequel". The A.V. Club gave it a B− and remarked that it was "a part two in the classic, traditional sense, echoing without quite amplifying the pleasures of its predecessor." io9 declared that the film was "a quintessential great sequel." Nick Allen of RogerEbert.com gave the film three out of four stars, criticizing Krasinski for not taking risks but praising its "incredibly robust and kinetic" action scenes. The film ranks on Rotten Tomatoes' Best Horror Movies of 2021.

=== Accolades ===
Award	Date of ceremony	Category	Recipient(s)	Result	Ref.
Hollywood Critics Association Midseason Awards	July 1, 2021	Best Picture	A Quiet Place Part II	Nominated	
Hollywood Critics Association Midseason Awards	July 1, 2021	Best Actress	Millicent Simmonds	Won	
Hollywood Critics Association Midseason Awards	July 1, 2021	Best Supporting Actress	Emily Blunt	Nominated	
Hollywood Critics Association Midseason Awards	July 1, 2021	Best Supporting Actor	Cillian Murphy	Won	
Hollywood Critics Association Midseason Awards	July 1, 2021	Best Filmmaker	John Krasinski	Nominated	
Hollywood Critics Association Midseason Awards	July 1, 2021	Best Screenplay	John Krasinski	Nominated	
People's Choice Awards	December 7, 2021	Best Drama Movie of 2021	A Quiet Place Part II	Nominated	
People's Choice Awards	December 7, 2021	Best Drama Actress	Emily Blunt	Nominated	
British Academy Film Awards	March 13, 2022	Best Sound	Erik Aadahl, Michael Barosky, Brandon Procter, Ethan Van der Ryn	Nominated	
Critics' Choice Super Awards	March 17, 2022	Best Horror Movie	A Quiet Place Part II	Won	
Critics' Choice Super Awards	March 17, 2022	Best Actor in a Horror Movie	Cillian Murphy	Nominated	
Critics' Choice Super Awards	March 17, 2022	Best Actress in a Horror Movie	Millicent Simmonds	Nominated	
MTV Movie & TV Awards	June 5, 2022	Most Frightened Performance	Millicent Simmonds	Nominated	
Saturn Awards	October 25, 2022	Best Horror Film	A Quiet Place Part II	Nominated	
Saturn Awards	October 25, 2022	Best Actress in a Film	Emily Blunt	Nominated	
Saturn Awards	October 25, 2022	Best Performance by a Younger Actor	Noah Jupe	Nominated	
Saturn Awards	October 25, 2022	Best Performance by a Younger Actor	Millicent Simmonds	Nominated	

The series was given the Seal of Authentic Representation from the Ruderman Family Foundation for the portrayal of Regan Abbott by Millicent Simmonds, as an actor with a disability and at least five lines of dialogue. John Krasinski was given an Excellence in Directing prize by The Media Access Awards for a commitment to disability inclusion on the film.

== Sequel ==
In May 2021, Blunt revealed that Krasinski had plans for a third film. Acknowledging that he had wanted to see how the second installment was received before moving forward on the next film, she stated it was intended to be a trilogy. In July 2021, Blunt confirmed that Krasinski was working on a third installment, separate from the spin-off film A Quiet Place: Day One, with intentions to once again serve as director. In October 2025, Paramount Pictures announced that A Quiet Place Part III has a release date of July 30, 2027.

== See also ==
- Impact of the COVID-19 pandemic on cinema
- List of films featuring the deaf and hard of hearing
- List of films featuring extraterrestrials
