= Andrew Form =

American film producer (born 1969)

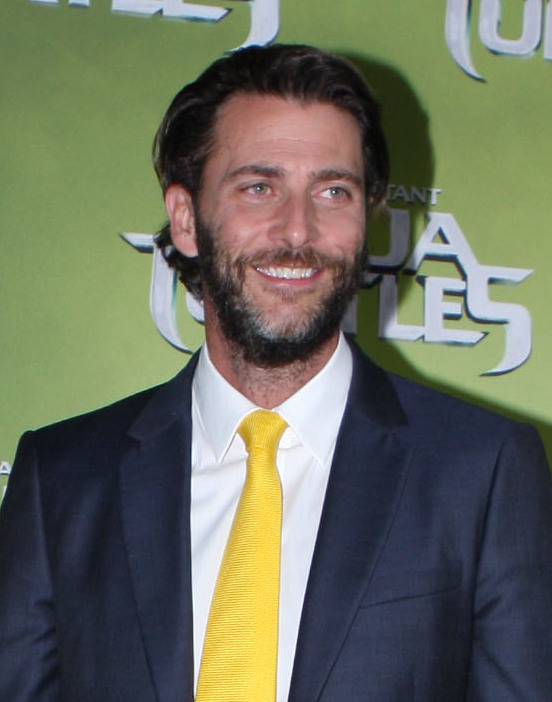
- Form in 2014
- Born: February 3, 1969 (age 57); New York, U.S.
- Occupation: Film producer
- Years active: 1994–present
- Known for: Friday the 13th; Teenage Mutant Ninja Turtles; The Purge; A Quiet Place
- Spouse(s): Jordana Brewster (m. 2007; div. 2021) Alexandra Daddario (m. 2022; sep. 2026)
- Children: 3
- Relatives: Matthew Daddario (brother-in-law)

Andrew Form (born February 3, 1969) is an American film producer known for producing the films Friday the 13th, Teenage Mutant Ninja Turtles, The Purge and A Quiet Place. He is the co-founder of company Platinum Dunes along with Michael Bay and Brad Fuller.

== Career ==
Form began working in the film industry as a production assistant for producer Jerry Bruckheimer and Bruckheimer's late producing partner Don Simpson.

Form founded the production company Platinum Dunes with filmmakers Michael Bay and Brad Fuller in 2001. Platinum Dunes is known for producing reboots of popular horror films such as The Texas Chainsaw Massacre (2003), The Amityville Horror (2005), Friday the 13th (2009) and A Nightmare on Elm Street (2010).

He is also known for producing original film series such as The Purge, Ouija (2014), A Quiet Place (2018) and its 2020 sequel. He co-produced the television series Black Sails (2014–2017) and Jack Ryan (2018–present). In 2015, The Hollywood Reporter called him one of the "30 Most Powerful Film Producers in Hollywood".

In 2018, Form and Fuller started Fully Formed Entertainment together. The company signed a three-year deal with Paramount Pictures beginning in 2019. Form left the venture in 2020, when he entered talks to join John Krasinski's Sunday Night Productions.

He also produced the film A Quiet Place: Day One.

== Personal life ==
Form met actress Jordana Brewster on the set of The Texas Chainsaw Massacre: The Beginning, which Form produced. They announced their engagement on November 4, 2006, and married in the Bahamas on May 6, 2007. Their first son was born in September 2013, and their second in June 2016. Brewster filed for divorce in mid-2020. The divorce was finalized in June 2021. His engagement to Alexandra Daddario was announced on December 2, 2021. The pair married in June 2022. In July 2024, Daddario announced she was pregnant with her and Form's first child together, after previously suffering a miscarriage. The child was born on October 31, 2024. In February 2026, the couple jointly announced their separation.

== Filmography ==
=== Executive producer ===
Year	Title	Notes	Ref
2003	The Texas Chainsaw Massacre		
2013	Occult	TV movie	
2014	Black Sails	3 episodes	
2014–2015	The Last Ship	15 episodes	

=== Producer ===
Year	Title	Notes	Ref
1995	The Making of "Crimson Tide"	Documentary short	
1997	Trading Favors		
1998	Kissing a Fool		
2001	The Shrink Is In		
2005	The Amityville Horror		
2006	The Texas Chainsaw Massacre: The Beginning		
2007	The Hitcher		
2009	The Unborn		
2009	Horsemen		
2009	Friday the 13th		
2010	A Nightmare on Elm Street		
2013	The Purge		
2014	The Purge: Anarchy		
2014	Teenage Mutant Ninja Turtles		
2014	Ouija		
2015	Project Almanac		
2016	Teenage Mutant Ninja Turtles: Out of the Shadows		
2016	The Purge: Election Year		
2016	Ouija: Origin of Evil		
2018	A Quiet Place		
2018	The First Purge		
2018	Slender Man		
2020	A Quiet Place Part II		
2021	The Forever Purge		
2024	IF		
2024	A Quiet Place: Day One		
2025	Anaconda		
2026	Jack Ryan: Ghost War		
2027	A Quiet Place Part III		
