= Katy O'Brian =

American actress

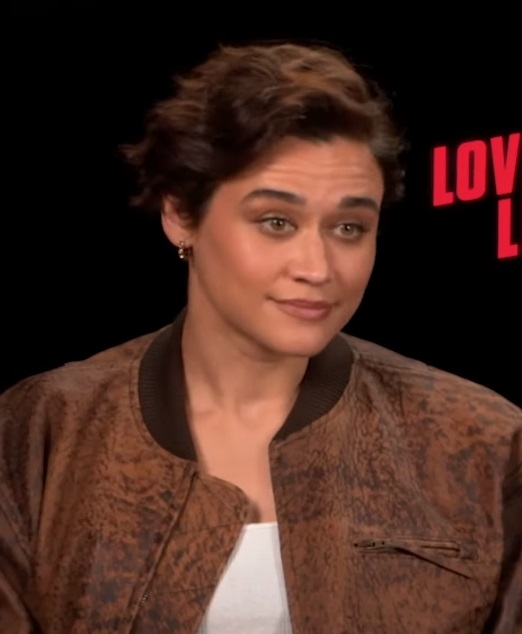
- O'Brian in 2024
- Education: Indiana University Bloomington (BA)
- Occupations: Actress; martial artist
- Years active: 2010–present
- Spouse: Kylie Chi (m. 2020)
- Website: katyobrian.com

Katy M. O'Brian is an American actress. She is best known for her roles as bodybuilder Jackie in Love Lies Bleeding, Imperial communications officer Elia Kane in the second and third seasons of The Mandalorian, George in Syfy's zombie show Z Nation, Major Sara Grey in The CW's superhero series Black Lightning, Kimball in Agents of S.H.I.E.L.D., Jentorra in Ant-Man and the Wasp: Quantumania, and Kodiak in Mission: Impossible – The Final Reckoning.

== Early life ==
O'Brian is mixed race, with black and white ancestry. O'Brian began studying martial arts at five years old, and at age nine earned her brown belt in Shorei Goju Ryu Karate. Throughout her youth, she participated in numerous sports programs and also in music programs as a percussionist.

She attended Indiana University Bloomington, majoring in psychology and Germanic studies. She was one of the first members of the university's short-form improv troupe Hoosonfirst. She received law enforcement certification through the university's Cadet Officer Program. At university, she received her black belt in hapkido through the US Hapkido Federation.

After graduation, she was a police officer for seven years at the Carmel Police Department in Carmel, Indiana, including the department's Crisis Intervention Team, which specialized in helping individuals with various conditions such as psychosis, depression, Alzheimer's, and autism. She obtained her personal trainer certification and began competing in bodybuilding figure competitions, and training at the Indy Actors Academy. She competed twice in figures, in September 2014 and May 2015, but stopped because of the expense and because she did not want to take steroids like some other competitors.

In 2016, O'Brian moved to Los Angeles to pursue a career in film and television. While waiting to land a role, she worked with the University of California, Los Angeles Martial Arts Program, helping with self-defense classes and instructing the Hapkido program. Through the same program she also studied Muay Thai and Brazilian jiu-jitsu.

== Career ==
O'Brian's first television role was as a Savior named Katy on AMC's The Walking Dead, followed by roles on Halt and Catch Fire, Tosh.0 and How to Get Away with Murder.

In 2018, O'Brian booked her first regular role on the comedy action series Z Nation where she played George, a budding leader of the apocalypse. In 2019, she appeared in the CW series Black Lightning as an ASA antagonist, Major Sara Grey. She appeared in season 3 of HBO's Westworld.

In 2020, O'Brian was cast as Elia Kane, a key recurring character in Seasons 2 and 3 of the Star Wars series The Mandalorian.

She had been featured in the Marvel Cinematic Universe: in 2020 as Kimball in Agents of S.H.I.E.L.D.; and in 2023, in a leading role as Jentorra, leader of the Freedom Fighters in the Quantum Realm in Ant-Man and the Wasp: Quantumania. She is one of the many actors who has appeared in both the Star Wars and Marvel franchises.

In 2022, it was announced that O'Brian would star opposite Kristen Stewart in Love Lies Bleeding, her first major film role. The film was released theatrically by A24 on March 8, 2024. In March 2024, O'Brian joined the cast of Mission: Impossible – The Final Reckoning, playing a U.S. Navy diver. The film was released on May 23, 2025.

== Personal life ==
O'Brian is openly gay. She has described her coming‑out process as gradual, recalling that although she grew up in an accepting family, she was initially unsure about her sexuality. Her "tipping point" came during a date with a man, when she later said, "I'm kind of more into this shellfish than I am into this guy," realising that her attraction lay with women. She has also recounted that friends eventually asked her, "So, are you gay yet?", and that "the joy on their faces when I finally said yes was great."

After moving to Los Angeles in 2016, O'Brian met her partner, Kylie Chi, while working on a student film. They married in July 2020 and live in Los Angeles O'Brian has Crohn's disease and underwent bowel surgery after filming Love Lies Bleeding.

== Filmography ==
Key
| † | Denotes films that have not yet been released |

=== Film ===
| Year | Title | Role | Notes |
|---|---|---|---|
| 2021 | Sweet Girl | TV Host | |
| 2023 | Ant-Man and the Wasp: Quantumania | Jentorra | |
| 2024 | Love Lies Bleeding | Jaqueline "Jackie" Cleaver | |
| 2024 | Twisters | Dani | |
| 2025 | Mission: Impossible – The Final Reckoning | Kodiak | |
| 2025 | Queens of the Dead | Dre | |
| 2025 | Christy | Lisa Holewyne | |
| 2025 | Maintenance Required | Kam | |
| 2025 | The Running Man | Jenni Laughlin | |
| 2027 | A Quiet Place Part III † | TBA | Filming |

=== Television ===
| Year | Title | Role | Notes |
|---|---|---|---|
| 2017 | Tosh.0 | Softball Player | Episode: "UCF Baseball Player" |
| 2017 | Halt and Catch Fire | Bartender | Episode: "Search" |
| 2017–2018 | The Walking Dead | Katy | 2 episodes |
| 2018 | How to Get Away with Murder | Cashier Girl | Episode: "Ask Him About Stella" |
| 2018 | Z Nation | Georgia "George" St. Clair | Main cast (season 5) |
| 2019–2020 | Black Lightning | Major Sara Grey | Recurring role (season 3) |
| 2020 | Agents of S.H.I.E.L.D. | Kimball | 3 episodes (season 7) |
| 2020 | Westworld | EMT | Episode: "The Absence of Field" |
| 2020 | The Talking Zed Show | Herself | TV series |
| 2020, 2023 | The Mandalorian | Elia Kane | Recurring role (seasons 2–3) |
| 2021 | Magnum P.I. | Kai Durrell | Episode: "First the Beatdown, Then the Blowback" |
| 2021 | The Rookie | Katie Barnes | Episode: "New Blood" |
| 2021 | 24 Hours of Nothing But Net with Debbie Antonelli | Herself | TV special |
