= A Quiet Place =

2018 film by John Krasinski

- Theatrical release poster
- Directed by: John Krasinski
- Screenplay by: Bryan Woods Scott Beck; John Krasinski
- Story by: Bryan Woods; Scott Beck
- Produced by: Michael Bay; Andrew Form; Brad Fuller
- Starring: Emily Blunt; John Krasinski
- Cinematography: Charlotte Bruus Christensen
- Edited by: Christopher Tellefsen
- Music by: Marco Beltrami
- Production companies: Paramount Pictures; Platinum Dunes; Sunday Night Productions
- Distributed by: Paramount Pictures
- Release dates: March 9, 2018 (SXSW); April 6, 2018 (United States)
- Running time: 90 minutes
- Country: United States
- Languages: English; American Sign Language
- Budget: $17 million
- Box office: $341 million

A Quiet Place is a 2018 American post-apocalyptic horror film directed by John Krasinski, from a screenplay co-written by Scott Beck and Bryan Woods and Krasinski based on a story Beck and Woods conceived. It tells the story of a mother (Emily Blunt) and father (Krasinski) who struggle to survive and raise their children (Millicent Simmonds and Noah Jupe) in a post-apocalyptic world inhabited by blind extraterrestrial creatures with an acute sense of hearing. It is the first film in the A Quiet Place universe. Its sequel, A Quiet Place Part II, was released in 2020.

Beck and Woods developed the concept for the story while in college and began writing the screenplay in January 2016. They told Platinum Dunes producers that they wanted Blunt for the role of the mother. In July 2016, Krasinski read their script for the role of the father. He spoke with Blunt about his ideas for the story, and she suggested he direct the film. Blunt initially did not take the role, but later felt connected to the story after reading the script. The two collaborated on ideas for the film during pre-production. Krasinski was announced as director, co-writer, and co-star with Blunt in March 2017. Filming took place in upstate New York from May to November 2017.

A Quiet Place premiered at South by Southwest on March 9, 2018 and was released in the United States on April 6, 2018 by Paramount Pictures. It grossed more than $340 million worldwide and received critical acclaim. The film was chosen by the National Board of Review and American Film Institute as one of the top ten films of 2018, and received nominations for the Golden Globe Award for Best Original Score, Academy Award for Best Sound Editing, Writers Guild of America Award for Best Original Screenplay. Blunt won the Screen Actors Guild Award for Outstanding Performance by a Female Actor in a Supporting Role.

== Plot ==
Sightless aliens with sharp hearing and impenetrable armored skin have taken over the planet and killed most of the human population. The Abbott family – father Lee, mother Evelyn, deaf daughter Regan, and sons Marcus and Beau – live on their isolated farm in a forest in Millbrook, New York, and have survived by taking precautions such as laying sand paths to avoid stepping on crunching leaves and using American Sign Language when communicating.

When the family goes into the nearby town for supplies, Beau finds a toy Space Shuttle, but Lee takes out the batteries and makes him leave it behind due to the noise it would make if powered on. Regan returns the toy to Beau without its batteries, but he takes the batteries without anyone noticing. While walking home, Beau activates the toy, which starts making noise. Almost immediately, Beau is killed by a nearby alien. Regan suffers terrible guilt after Beau's death.

Over a year later, Evelyn is pregnant with a fourth child. Lee is trying to build a working hearing aid for Regan, but can't master the electronics; the attempt causes a high-pitched noise but does not improve hearing. Marcus reluctantly goes fishing with Lee while Regan, upset that she cannot go, visits Beau's grave. While the rest of the family is away, Evelyn goes into labor. While heading to the basement, she accidentally steps on an upright nail and drops a photo frame, alerting a nearby alien, which enters the house. Struggling to stay silent amidst the pain, Evelyn flips a switch in the basement, turning the lights around the house red. The alien enters the basement, but Evelyn distracts it by setting off an egg timer and escapes upstairs. Upon returning to the farm and seeing the red lights, Lee instructs Marcus to lure the alien out of the house by lighting off fireworks, allowing Evelyn to give birth.

Regan, seeing the fireworks, runs back to the house. Lee enters the house armed with a shotgun and finds the baby and Evelyn, then brings them into a hiding spot under the floor in the barn outside. The baby cries, and a creature enters the barn. The alien fails to find the source of the noise but breaks some water pipes. Evelyn wakes up in the flooded hideout with the alien still inside and hides behind the falling water to mask her and the baby's sound.

Marcus and Regan climb to the top of a corn silo and light a signal fire to alert their father, but after the fire dies, Regan wants to leave. In trying to stop her, Marcus falls into the silo, and a segment of the roof falls in after him. Regan jumps in after him and guides him on to the fallen roof segment but then gets sucked into the corn. Marcus reaches in and pulls her out. However, hearing the commotion, the alien runs towards the silo and attacks Regan and Marcus. Failing to see the alien behind her, Regan attempts to use the hearing aid her father was building, which emits a high pitched whine that causes the creature to reel in pain and retreat, breaking a hole in the silo, which frees the children. Lee finds Regan and Marcus and directs them to his truck when he sees an alien nearby. When the alien attacks him, he is wounded, and Marcus cannot stifle a scream. The alien then attacks the truck, and Lee prepares to distract the alien to save his children. Lee signs to Regan that he has always loved her and yells to draw the alien's attention. Marcus and Regan coast the truck back to the house.

Reuniting with a grieving Evelyn, they make their way back into the house, followed by an alien. Regan's hearing aid again misfires, causing the alien to react, and Regan, realizing its reaction to the high-pitched noise from her implant, places it on a microphone, which amplifies the noise. The alien screeches in pain and involuntarily exposes the vulnerable tissue beneath the armor plating on its head, allowing Evelyn to kill it with Lee's pump shotgun. Armed with high-pitched sound as a new weapon, the family prepares to defend themselves from the approaching pack of aliens who heard the shot; in the final scene, Evelyn defiantly racks the shotgun, putting a live shell in the chamber.

== Cast ==
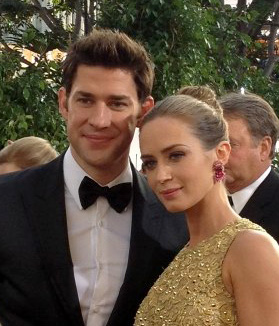
John Krasinski (left) and Emily Blunt (right), who play the lead roles in the film

- Emily Blunt as Evelyn Abbott, wife of Lee, and the mother to their four children, Regan, Marcus, Beau, and baby Abbott. Krasinski said her character wanted to ensure that their children "be fully-formed, fully-thinking people."
- John Krasinski as Lee Abbott, an engineer who is Evelyn's husband and the father of Regan, Marcus, Beau, and newborn baby Abbott. Krasinski described his character as a survivalist focused on getting his family through each day.
  - Krasinski also provided the motion-capture for the extraterrestrial creatures.
- Millicent Simmonds as Regan Abbott, Lee and Evelyn's 15-year-old deaf daughter, and Marcus' and Beau's older sister. Krasinski said he sought a deaf actress "...for many reasons; I didn't want a non-deaf actress pretending to be deaf ... a deaf actress would help my knowledge and my understanding of the situations tenfold. I wanted someone who lives it and who could teach me about it on set."
- Noah Jupe as Marcus Abbott, Lee and Evelyn's 12-year-old middle child and Regan's and Beau's brother. Krasinski noticed Jupe in the 2016 miniseries The Night Manager and watched an early screening of the 2017 film Suburbicon to evaluate Jupe's performance.
- Cade Woodward as Beau Abbott, Lee and Evelyn's four-year-old son.
- Leon Russom as a man in the woods.

== Production ==
=== Development and writing ===
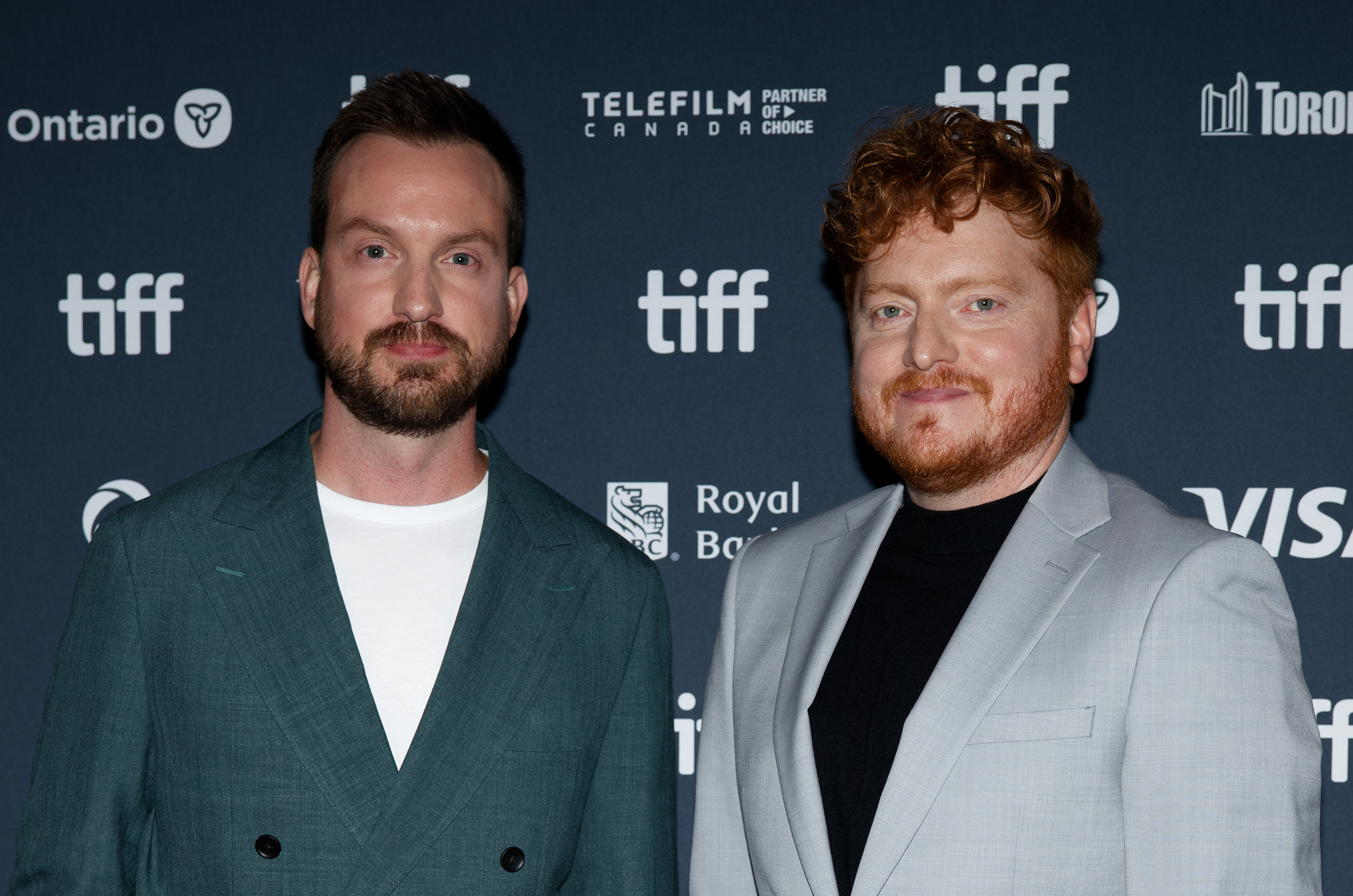
Screenwriters Scott Beck and Bryan Woods in 2024

Scott Beck and Bryan Woods began writing A Quiet Place in January 2016 based on a concept they conceived in college. When they first spoke with Platinum Dunes about the project, the two said they wanted Emily Blunt for the role of the mother. Platinum Dunes' Michael Bay had a first-look deal with Paramount Pictures and showed their script to the studio. During the writing stage, Beck and Woods spoke to a Paramount executive, who suggested that the film could be a crossover with the Cloverfield franchise. When they took their final script to Paramount, the studio embraced it as a distinct, stand-alone story. Paramount bought the script from the duo. Platinum Dunes producers Andrew Form and Brad Fuller sent the script to John Krasinski to play the role of the father, which he read in July. The concept of parents protecting their children appealed to him, especially as his second child with Blunt had recently been born. Beck and Woods also cited Bong Joon-ho's The Host (2006) as a significant influence on their screenplay for the film.

After reading Beck and Wood's script, Krasinski pitched his vision of the story to Blunt, who suggested he direct the film. In a meeting with the producers, Krasinski expressed his desire to co-write and direct it and pitched them his vision. When he co-wrote the script, he had Blunt in mind for the role; however, he did not ask her to do it as she had just had a child, was working on another film, and he was concerned that if he asked she would either decline it or accept it to support him. "I just thought if she does this, she has to come to it on her own." Blunt initially did not want to be cast, but after reading Krasinski's script on a flight she felt she needed to do it as the story "represented some of my deepest fears—of not being able to protect my children."

Beck and Woods said that Krasinski taking over the film as director "wasn't about reshaping it in any massive way" and that he "really protected our vision of the script". Krasinski said that their script differed from his "in a bunch of little ways, but the heart was all theirs. They really had this thing that I wanted to be a part of." He focused on the idea of family being the core of the story, "so every scare has to be because you love this family, every detail has to become a detail that says something about this family not just to be cool, not just to be scary." His contributions to the screenplay included the use of sign language, sand paths, the lights, and the walk to the forest and the pharmacy. Krasinski was initially anxious about having very little dialogue to work with, as he was concerned with how to "keep people interested". He then realized that minimal dialogue became the film's "superpower". The use of sign language came about when, prior to filming, Simmonds showed Krasinski the American Sign Language translation for a scene's dialogue, and he found her gestures to be "so much more cinematic than saying the words would've been". Blunt contributed to the pre-production stage of the film. Most of the directing Krasinski did with her role was off-screen from the moment she accepted the project. The two worked through the script and discussed the shots for the film before it went into production, and by the time they got on set they had "done all the collaborating ... all the hard work." Blunt "offered up the greatest ideas" for the film, he stated, crediting her for "raising the game" for him as a filmmaker.

In March 2017, Krasinski was announced as director and co-writer of the film, co-starring with Blunt. The film is his third directorial credit and his first for a major studio. The film was produced on a budget of $17 million.

=== Filming ===
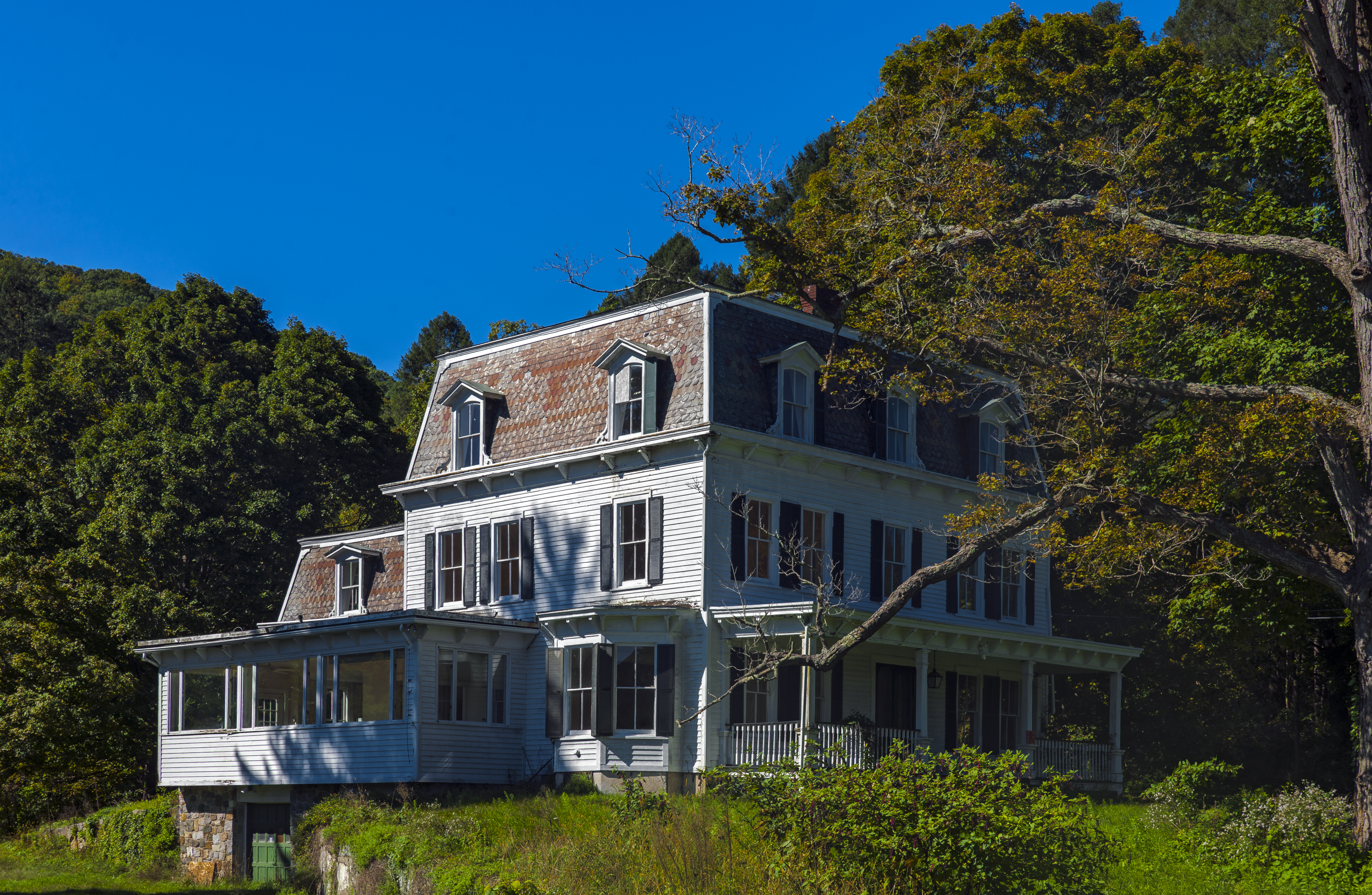
House used as the Abbotts' home

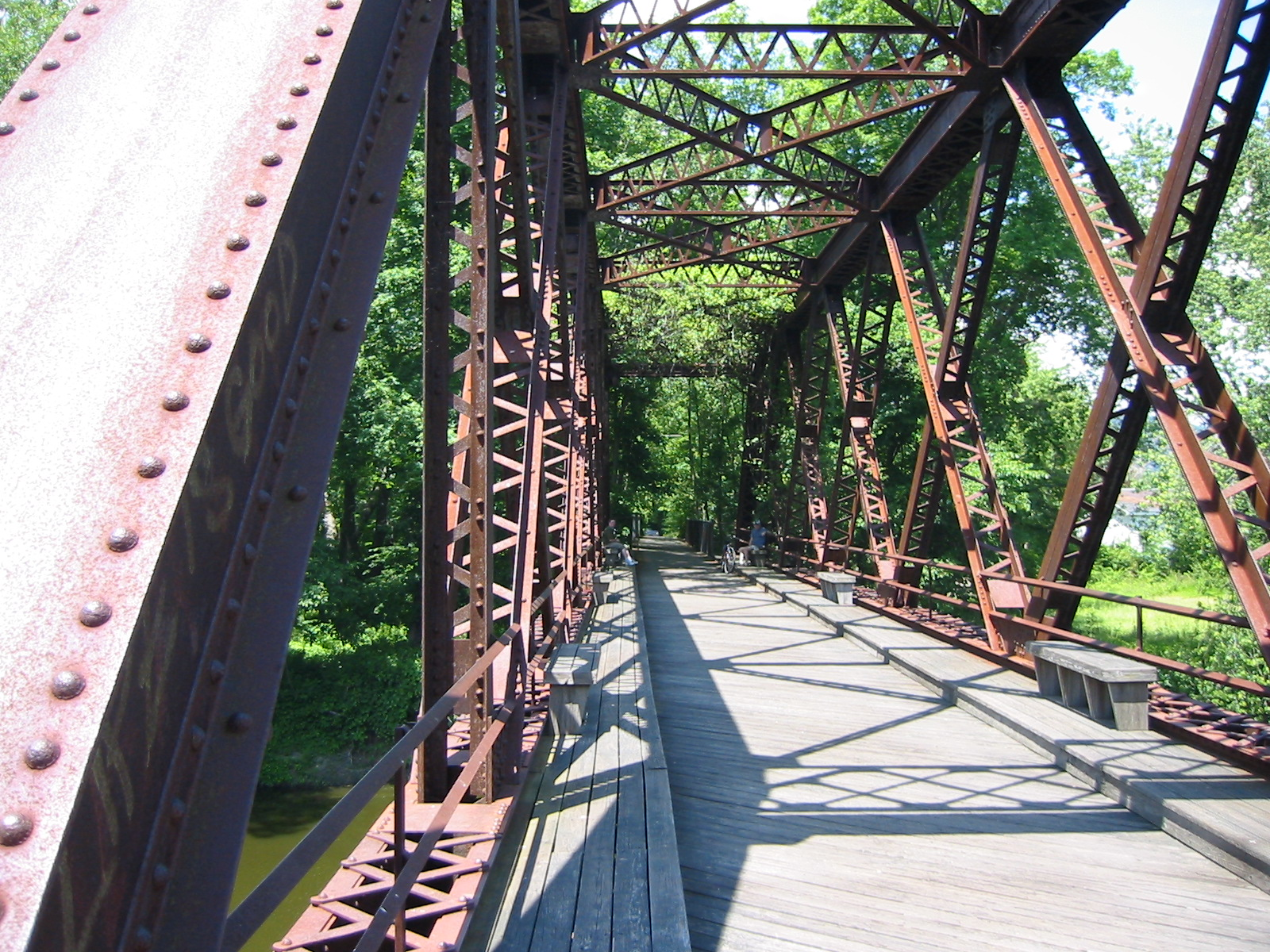
The Springtown Truss Bridge on the Wallkill Valley Rail Trail, used as a location in the film

The film was shot in 36 days. Production took place from May to November 2017 in Dutchess and Ulster counties in Downstate New York. Filmmakers spent their budget locally, including a purchase of 20 tons of corn, which they hired local farmers to grow. Some filming took place on a soundstage in the town of Pawling in Dutchess County, as well as on location in the county's city of Beacon. Filming also took place on the Wallkill Valley Rail Trail in New Paltz of Ulster County, using the Springtown Truss Bridge. Outside Dutchess and Ulster counties, filming took place on Main Street in Little Falls in Herkimer County, New York.

=== Sound and music ===
During filming, the crew avoided making noise so diegetic synchronized sounds (e.g., the sound of rolling dice on a game board) could be recorded; the sounds were amplified in post-production. A musical score was added, which Krasinski justified in wanting audiences to have a cinematic experience and some familiarity with a traditional film component, instead of feeling like they're part of a "silence experiment." Some music was cut from the film, which Krasinski found more impactful than having the score dominate scenes.

Supervising sound editors Erik Aadahl and Ethan Van der Ryn worked on A Quiet Place. For scenes from the perspective of the deaf daughter, sound was removed to put greater focus on the visual. They also advised on organizing shots to reflect the creatures' perspective, like showing them noticing a sound, then showing what was causing the sound. Composer Marco Beltrami provided the sound editors music to work with in a way that would not interfere with the sound design throughout the film.

In the film, creatures are blind and communicate through clicking sounds. Aadahl and Van der Ryn said they were inspired by animal echolocation, such as that employed by bats. The sound of feedback, normally avoided by sound editors, was woven into the story at a volume level that would not bother audiences too much.

For moments in the movie that depict Regan's point of view, Simmonds worked with sound designers to convey what the cochlear implants in the movie would have sounded like, and what she was able to hear without the implants.

=== Use of sign language ===
The characters communicate in American Sign Language (ASL) to avoid making sound, so the filmmakers hired deaf mentor Douglas Ridloff to teach ASL to the actors and to be available to make corrections. They also hired an ASL interpreter for deaf actress Simmonds, so that spoken and signed language could be interpreted back and forth on set. Simmonds grew up with ASL, and she helped teach her fellow actors to sign. She said, "In the movie, we've been signing together for years and years. So it should look fluent." She observed that each character's use of sign language reflected their motivations: the father had short and brief signs which showed his survival mentality, while the mother had more expressive signs as part of wanting her children to experience more than survival. Krasinski said that Simmonds's character used "signing that's very defiant, it's very teenage defiant."

Simmonds said that she suggested for the daughter to rebel rather than cower during a sign-language fight with her father. She also said that the script originally had the father sign "I love you" to his daughter at the end of the film, but she suggested for him to follow with "I've always loved you" to make up for their arguing earlier in the film.

Producers Andrew Form and Bradley Fuller said that they initially planned not to provide on-screen subtitles for sign-language dialogue while providing only "context clues," but they realized that subtitles were necessary for the scene in which the deaf daughter and her hearing father argue about the modified hearing aid. They subsequently added subtitles for all sign-language dialogue in the film.

=== Creature design ===
Production designer Jeffrey Beecroft headed the creature design, and Industrial Light & Magic created the creatures, led by visual effects supervisor Scott Farrar. The director wanted the creatures to look like they had evolved to no longer need eyes, and to be "somewhat humanoid" in nature. Farrar said the initial creature design showed them with rhinoceros-like horns out of their faces, but later redesigns omitted this because it was not scary enough. Creature designers referenced prehistoric fish, black snakes, and bats, particularly their movement patterns. Inspiration was also drawn from bog people: cadavers that have been mummified in peat, turning the skin black and giving it a sagging, leathery look." Krasinski provided motion capture for the creatures.

== Marketing ==
Paramount Pictures released the first trailer for A Quiet Place in November 2017. It aired a 30-second commercial for the film during the US football championship Super Bowl LII on February 4, 2018. Of the seven trailers that aired during the playoff, A Quiet Place and Red Sparrow were shown during the pregame and had the lowest views and social conversations. A Quiet Place had 149,000 views on YouTube, 275,000 views on Facebook, and 2,900 social conversations. On February 12, 2018, Krasinski appeared on The Ellen DeGeneres Show to present the full trailer for A Quiet Place. The studio spent an estimated $86 million on prints and advertisements for the film.

== Release ==
=== Premiere ===
A Quiet Place had its world premiere at the South by Southwest film festival as the opening-night film on March 9, 2018. It was selected from 2,458 submissions, and earned "raves" from critics, according to IndieWire. Following its premiere, the film experienced social media growth to over 52 million views across multiple platforms, outpacing Get Out (2017), which had 46.9 million views.

=== Box office forecast ===
The Tracking Board reported on March 14, "The stellar reviews out of SXSW, coupled with the fact that there isn't anything like it in the marketplace, should help it stand out among its bigger-budget competition." Deadline Hollywood said on March 15 that the film was projected to gross around $20 million in its opening weekend. Variety reported on March 27 that the film "is tracking to open between" $16 million and $30 million, which reached a basement of low-$20 million by the week of its release.

BoxOffice initially estimated on February 9, 2018, that A Quiet Place would gross $17 million in its opening weekend, and that it would gross a total of $60 million in the United States. By March 30, it increased its estimate to an opening weekend gross of $27.5 million and a US total gross of $85 million. The magazine said the film's trailer was well-received online and that it appeared frequently in previews for Star Wars: The Last Jedi. BoxOffice wrote, "The horror genre has also shown a knack for over-performing against expectations at the box office in recent years, setting this release up for potential success." It added that A Quiet Place would have to compete against another horror film, Truth or Dare, which would be released the following weekend. The magazine's staff drew "very favorable" comparisons between A Quiet Place and the 2016 films 10 Cloverfield Lane and Don't Breathe.

=== Theatrical run ===
A Quiet Place was first commercially released in theaters in the first week of April 2018 in multiple territories, including North America. The film grossed $188 million in the United States and Canada, and $152 million in other territories, for a worldwide total of $341 million. Deadline Hollywood estimates the net profit of the film to be $93 million, when factoring together all expenses and revenues.

Paramount Pictures released the film in 3,508 theaters in the United States and Canada on April 6, 2018, alongside Blockers, Chappaquiddick, and The Miracle Season. The film made $18.9 million on its first day (including $4.3 million from Thursday night previews at 2,750 theaters), increasing weekend projections to $47 million. Unlike most horror films, which are front-loaded on Friday and experience drops the rest of the weekend, A Quiet Place made $19.1 million on Saturday. It went on to debut to $50.2 million, topping the box office and marking the biggest opening for a Paramount film since Star Trek Beyond in July 2016.

The film made $32.9 million in its second weekend, dropping 34% (better than the 50+% that horror films normally see) and finishing second at the box office, behind newcomer Rampage ($35.7 million). The hold represented the second-best-ever second weekend for a scary movie behind It. The film regained the top spot the following week, grossing $20.9 million (a 36% drop), but dropped back down to second place the following weekend behind newcomer Avengers: Infinity War with $10.7 million.

Through its first two weeks of international release, the film had made $51.7 million, with its top markets being the United Kingdom ($9.2 million), Mexico ($5.1 million), Australia ($4.6 million), Brazil ($3.9 million), Indonesia ($3.4 million), the Philippines ($2.7 million) and Taiwan ($1.9 million). It also debuted to $2.2 million in Russia, the biggest-ever opening for a Paramount horror film in the country. In its third weekend overseas, it dipped only 37% for a total of $15 million from 57 markets. In its fourth weekend in international markets, it grossed $6.6 million. As of May 20, 2018, the film's largest markets were United Kingdom ($16.3 million), Australia ($9.3 million), Mexico ($7.5 million) and Brazil ($6.9 million). The film was released in China on May 18 and made $17.7 million from 8,731 screens in its opening weekend.

== Reception ==
=== Critical response ===
On review aggregator Rotten Tomatoes, A Quiet Place holds an approval rating of 96% based on 387 reviews, and an average rating of 8.2/10. The website's critical consensus reads: "A Quiet Place artfully plays on elemental fears with a ruthlessly intelligent creature feature that's as original as it is scary – and establishes director John Krasinski as a rising talent." On Metacritic, the film has a weighted average score of 82 out of 100, based on 55 critics, indicating "universal acclaim". Audiences polled by CinemaScore gave the film an average grade of "B+" on an A+ to F scale, while PostTrak reported filmgoers gave it an 81% overall positive score and a 63% "definite recommend".

Writing for Rolling Stone, Peter Travers gave the film 3.5 out of 4, praising the movie's exploration of themes about parenthood, and saying "This new horror classic will fry your nerves to a frazzle."

Variety's Owen Gleiberman said, "A Quiet Place is a tautly original genre-bending exercise, technically sleek and accomplished, with some vivid, scary moments, though it's a little too in love with the stoned logic of its own premise." Michael Phillips of the Chicago Tribune gave the film 2.5 out of 4 and said, "My favorite moment, an encounter between Regan and one of the monsters in a cornfield, plays with sound and image and tension, creatively. Other bits are more shameless...I don't know if I'd call A Quiet Place enjoyable; it's more grueling than cathartic."

Author Stephen King praised the film in a tweet, saying, "A QUIET PLACE is an extraordinary piece of work. Terrific acting, but the main thing is the SILENCE, and how it makes the camera's eye open wide in a way few movies manage." Nick Allen of RogerEbert.com called A Quiet Place "Krasinski's breakthrough as a triple-threat entertainer, but it's been a long time coming... By no accident, he's tackled the horror genre while relying on the unique strength that can be seen throughout his acting work, and one that has made him relatable as an everyman across TV and film—expressive silence."

Peter Bradshaw of The Guardian says: "In its simplicity and punch, this is a film that feels as if it could have been made decades ago, in the classic age of Planet of the Apes or The Omega Man. It is a cracking back-to-basics thriller that does not depend too much on what these creatures look like."

Matthew Monagle of Film School Rejects said A Quiet Place seemed to be "the early frontrunner for the sparsely intellectual horror movie of the year", like previous films The Babadook (2014) and The Witch (2015). Monagle said Krasinski, who had directed two previous films, was "making an unusual pivot into a genre typically reserved for newcomers", and considered it to be part of a movement toward horror films layered "in storytelling, [with] character beats not typically found in a horror movie". Tatiana Tenreyro, writing for Bustle, said while A Quiet Place was not a silent film, "It is the first of its kind within the modern horror genre for how little spoken dialogue it actually has." She said the rare moments of spoken dialogue "give depth to this horror movie, showing how the narrative defies the genre's traditional films even further".

In July 2025, The Hollywood Reporter ranked it number 23 on its list of the "25 Best Horror Movies of the 21st Century."

=== Accolades ===
Award	Date of ceremony	Category	Recipient(s)	Result	Ref(s).
Academy Awards	February 24, 2019	Best Sound Editing	Erik Aadahl and Ethan Van der Ryn	Nominated	
American Film Institute Awards	January 4, 2019	Top 10 Films of the Year	A Quiet Place	Won	
British Academy Film Awards	February 10, 2019	Best Sound	Erik Aadahl, Michael Barosky, Brandon Procter, Ethan Van der Ryn	Nominated	
Critics' Choice Movie Awards	January 13, 2019	Best Sci-Fi/Horror Movie	A Quiet Place	Won	
Critics' Choice Movie Awards	January 13, 2019	Best Original Screenplay	John Krasinski, Scott Beck and Bryan Woods	Nominated	
Critics' Choice Movie Awards	January 13, 2019	Best Young Performer	Millicent Simmonds	Nominated	
Golden Globe Awards	January 6, 2019	Best Original Score	Marco Beltrami	Nominated	
Hollywood Film Awards	November 4, 2018	Hollywood Sound Award	Erik Aadahl, Ethan Van der Ryn and Brandon Proctor	Won	
Hollywood Music in Media Awards	November 14, 2018	Original Score – Sci-Fi/Fantasy/Horror Film	Marco Beltrami	Nominated	
Motion Picture Sound Editors	February 17, 2019	Feature Film – Music Underscore	A Quiet Place	Nominated	
Motion Picture Sound Editors	February 17, 2019	Feature Film – Dialogue/ADR	A Quiet Place	Nominated	
Motion Picture Sound Editors	February 17, 2019	Feature Film – Effects/Foley	A Quiet Place	Won	
MTV Movie & TV Awards	June 16, 2018	Most Frightened Performance	Emily Blunt	Nominated	
National Board of Review	January 8, 2019	Top Ten Films	A Quiet Place	Won	
People's Choice Awards	November 11, 2018	Movie of the Year	A Quiet Place	Nominated	
People's Choice Awards	November 11, 2018	Drama Movie of the Year	A Quiet Place	Nominated	
People's Choice Awards	November 11, 2018	Drama Movie Star of the Year	Emily Blunt	Nominated	
People's Choice Awards	November 11, 2018	Drama Movie Star of the Year	John Krasinski	Nominated	
Producers Guild Awards	January 19, 2019	Producers Guild of America Award for Best Theatrical Motion Picture	A Quiet Place	Nominated	
San Diego Film Critics Society	December 9, 2018	Best Film	A Quiet Place	Nominated	
San Diego Film Critics Society	December 9, 2018	Best Director	John Krasinski	Nominated	
San Diego Film Critics Society	December 9, 2018	Best Editing	Christopher Tellefsen	Nominated	
San Diego Film Critics Society	December 9, 2018	Best Original Screenplay	John Krasinski, Scott Beck and Bryan Woods	Nominated	
Satellite Awards	February 17, 2019	Best Original Screenplay	John Krasinski, Scott Beck and Bryan Woods	Nominated	
Satellite Awards	February 17, 2019	Best Sound (Editing and Mixing)	A Quiet Place	Won	
Saturn Award	September 13, 2019	Best Horror Film	A Quiet Place	Won	
Saturn Award	September 13, 2019	Best Performance by a Younger Actor	Millicent Simmonds	Nominated	
Saturn Award	September 13, 2019	Best Writing	Bryan Woods, Scott Beck, John Krasinski	Won	
Saturn Award	September 13, 2019	Best Editing	Christopher Tellefsen	Nominated	
Saturn Award	September 13, 2019	Best Special Effects	A Quiet Place	Nominated	
Screen Actors Guild Awards	January 27, 2019	Outstanding Performance by a Female Actor in a Supporting Role	Emily Blunt	Won	
Teen Choice Awards	August 12, 2018	Choice Drama Movie	A Quiet Place	Nominated	
Writers Guild of America Awards	February 17, 2019	Best Original Screenplay	John Krasinski, Scott Beck and Bryan Woods	Nominated	

== Commentary and themes ==
=== Parenthood ===
Krasinski identified the primary theme of the film as a dramatization of "fears associated with modern parenthood". Krasinski, who had recently become a father, said in a conference interview that he "was already in a state of terror about whether or not [he] was a good enough father", and added that the meaning of parenthood had been elevated for him by imagining being a father in a nightmare world, struggling to simply keep his children alive. Krasinski has told CBS News that "the scares were secondary to how powerful this could be as an allegory or metaphor for parenthood. For me, this is all about parenthood."

Travers' Rolling Stone review argued that "the question Krasinski tackles is what defines a family and what's needed to preserve it? 'Who are we', asks Mom, 'if we can't protect our children?' The answers are worked out with satisfying complexity and genuine feeling, proving indeed that home is where family is." The Hollywood Reporter's John DeFore described the film as "a terrifying thriller with a surprisingly warm heart" and said, "you might have to go back to Jeff Nichols' 2011 Take Shelter to find a film that has used the fantastic this well to convey the combination of fear and responsibility a good parent feels".

=== Other themes ===
Speaking of the political and social commentary the film encouraged, Krasinski said, "That's not what I was going for, but the best compliment you can get on any movie is that it starts a conversation. The fact that people are leaving and talking about anything is really fun—but certainly about deep stuff like that, is awesome." Krasinski, who did not grow up with horror films, said that prior films of the genre such as Don't Breathe (2016) and Get Out (2017) that had societal commentary were part of his research. In addition to considering his film a metaphor for parenthood, he compared the premise to US politics in 2018, "I think in our political situation, that's what's going on now: You can close your eyes and stick your head in the sand, or you can try to participate in whatever's going on." He cited Jaws (1975) as an influence, with how the protagonist police officer moved from New York to an island to avoid frightening situations, and was forced to encounter one in his new location with shark attacks.

Roman Catholic Bishop Robert Barron was surprised by what he saw as strikingly religious themes in the film. He likened the family's primitive, agrarian life of silence to monasticism, and commends their self-giving love. Barron suggested pro-life themes, especially in the choices of the parents, as Mrs. Abbott risks everything to give birth to a child, and her husband lays down his own life so that the children can live: what Barron sees as the ultimate expression of parental love. Sonny Bunch of The Washington Post also commented and expanded on a pro-life message.

Richard Brody, writing for The New Yorker, criticized A Quiet Place for what he perceived to be the inclusion of conservative and pro-gun themes in the film. He described it as "the antithesis of 'Get Out'" and "both apparently unconscious and conspicuously regressive" and opined that it "[brings] to the fore the idealistic elements of gun culture while dramatizing the tragic implications that inevitably shadow that idealism." Krasinski addressed Brody's criticism in a subsequent interview with Esquire, stating that he did not write the film with an intentional political message. Krasinski said, "I never saw it that way or ever thought of it until it was presented to me in that way. [The film] wasn't about being, you know, silent and political... my whole metaphor was solely about parenthood."

== Home media ==
A Quiet Place was released on Digital HD on June 26, 2018, and on Ultra HD Blu-ray, Blu-ray and DVD on July 10, 2018. Paramount Pictures released a 4K, Steelbook+Blu-Ray+Digital version of the film on February 25, 2020.

== Sequels and spin-off ==
A sequel to A Quiet Place, titled A Quiet Place Part II, was written and directed by Krasinski and stars Blunt, Simmonds, Jupe, Cillian Murphy, and Djimon Hounsou. Taking place immediately following the first film, the sequel sees the Abbott family leaving their home and encountering more survivors in an attempt to find a new home. Part II had its premiere on March 8, 2020, and was released theatrically on May 28, 2021.

Another direct sequel, tentatively titled A Quiet Place Part III, is currently in production and is set to release on July 30, 2027.

A spin-off prequel, titled A Quiet Place: Day One, was written and directed by Michael Sarnoski. It stars Lupita Nyong'o as a terminally ill woman attempting to escape New York City during the early stages of the alien invasion. Day One was released on June 28, 2024.

== See also ==
- List of films featuring the deaf and hard of hearing
- List of horror films of 2018
- Sign-language media
- Disability in horror films
