= Millicent Simmonds =

American deaf actress (born 2003)

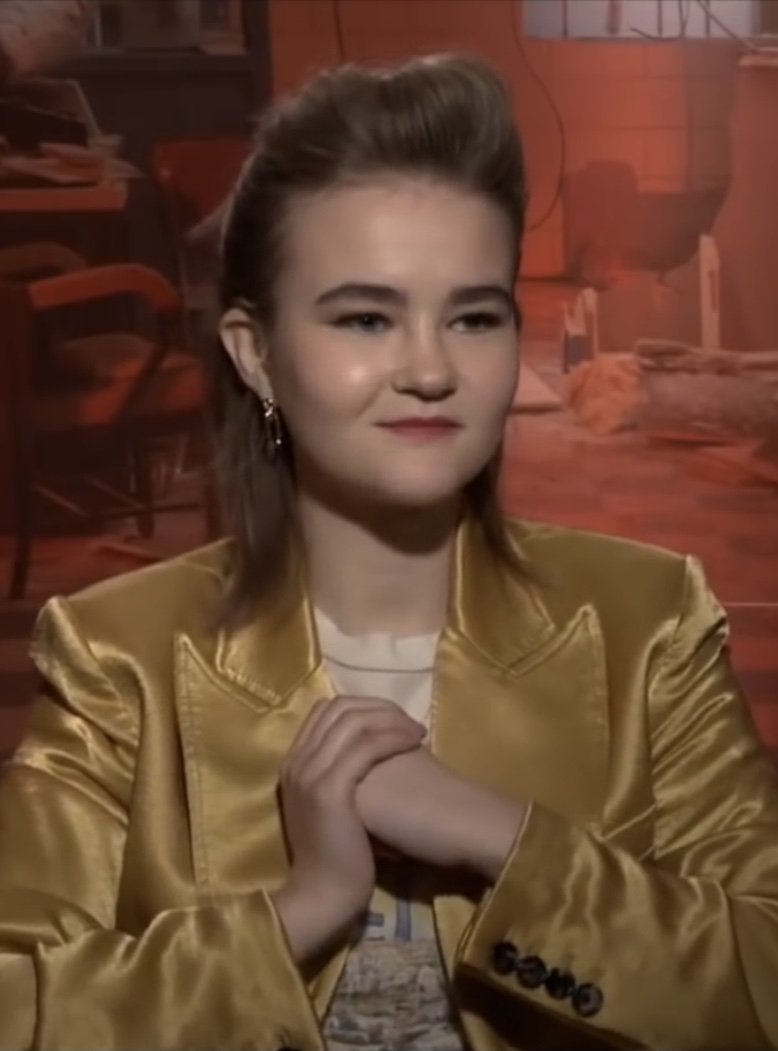
- Simmonds in 2021
- Born: March 6, 2003 (age 23)
- Other name: Millie Simmonds
- Occupation: Actress
- Years active: 2017–present

Millicent Simmonds (born March 6, 2003) is a deaf American actress who starred in the 2018 horror film A Quiet Place and its 2020 sequel A Quiet Place Part II. Her breakout role was in the 2017 drama film Wonderstruck. For Wonderstruck and A Quiet Place, she was nominated for several awards for best youth performance.

In addition to her film roles, Simmonds has had television appearances in Andi Mack (2018) and This Close (2019). She made her Broadway debut in 2023 with the play Grey House. She is an advocate for better deaf representation in entertainment. She also advocates improving accessibility for the deaf, including designing a lip-reading face mask.

== Background ==
Simmonds grew up in Bountiful, Utah in the United States. She has four siblings; two older and two younger than her. When Simmonds was two months old, an accidental medication overdose caused permanent hearing loss. Her mother learned American Sign Language and taught the family so they could communicate with her. Simmonds said without her family using ASL, "I wouldn't have a relationship with my own family, I wouldn't have communication." Simmonds also has a cochlear implant.

Simmonds's mother also encouraged her to read books extensively. When Simmonds was three years old, she started attending the Jean Massieu School of the Deaf, and around third grade, she started its drama club. Her first play was in A Midsummer Night's Dream as Puck. After completing sixth grade, she mainstreamed at the Mueller Park Junior High School in the fall of 2015. She has performed at the Utah Shakespeare Festival in Cedar City, Utah, and her primary film experience before Wonderstruck was a deaf student's short, "Color the World".

In the third quarter of 2020, Simmonds's father got a job promotion, and Simmonds and her family moved from Bountiful, Utah to a neighborhood north of Pittsburgh, Pennsylvania.

== Acting career ==
=== Wonderstruck and A Quiet Place ===
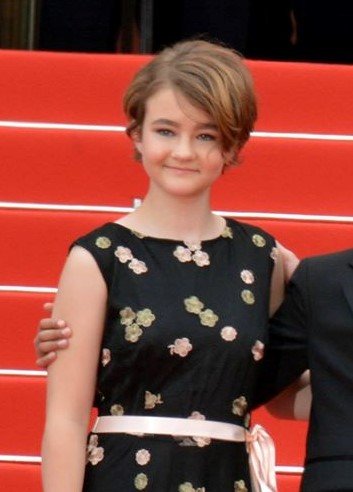
14-year-old Millicent Simmonds at Cannes Film Festival in 2017

Simmonds was 12 years old when she was cast for the film Wonderstruck, which was then released in 2017. She had read the deaf-themed juvenile novel Wonderstruck when it was published in 2011. When open casting for the film began, her former drama teacher shared the news with her, and she auditioned for a role in the film. She competed with over 250 others. When she won the role, she moved to New York City with her mother and her younger siblings to film Wonderstruck. She used American Sign Language interpreters to communicate on set and also received a tutor to continue schoolwork while filming. Vanity Fair's Charles Bramesco said of her casting, "A Utah native without any major film credits to her name, young Simmonds is expected to make quite a splash both as a new face in the industry as well as an icon for deaf and otherwise sensory-disabled actors." When Wonderstruck premiered at the 2017 Cannes Film Festival, the Associated Press's Jake Coyle said Simmonds's screen debut was "hailed as a breakthrough". Simmonds was subsequently nominated for several awards for best youth performance (see accolades). The Associated Press also recognized Simmonds as one of eight actors who were Breakthrough Entertainers of 2017.

In 2018, Simmonds starred in the horror film A Quiet Place as the deaf daughter of a hearing couple, played by John Krasinski and Emily Blunt. While the producers did not specifically plan to cast a deaf actress to play the deaf daughter, Krasinski, who was also the director, pushed to have a deaf actress. Simmonds and her family answered Krasinski's questions for writing a screenplay about a family with a deaf child. The filmmakers hired an ASL interpreter for Simmonds, so that signed and spoken language could be interpreted fluently on set. Simmonds helped teach her fellow actors to sign.

=== TV roles and return to A Quiet Place ===
In 2018, Simmonds appeared in a two-episode arc in the third season of the Disney Channel television series Andi Mack. She had first appeared as an extra in the first season, and the series creators invited her back for a recurring role. For her arc, Simmonds taught the other actors how to use ASL, and the showrunners decided to show her scenes involving ASL without providing subtitles so viewers could focus on figuring out the sign language. In one of the episodes, Simmonds also spoke for the first time ever on-camera, responding audibly "I like you" in response to Asher Angel's character Jonah signing "I like you" to her character. Simmonds said of the spoken dialogue, "I can't even remember how it was brought up or who had the idea, but I remember my mom asking me how I felt about it, and I told her I thought I could try. I was actually pretty nervous about it. I don't use my voice a lot in public."

In the following year, Simmonds appeared in an episode of the second season of This Close. In October, Simmonds was cast in a lead role in the pilot for the TV series Close Up on Freeform, and production took place later in the year in Vancouver. By May 2020, Freeform passed on the pilot.

Simmonds also reprised her role in the sequel film A Quiet Place Part II, which filmed in the middle of 2019. John Krasinski, who also directed the sequel, said, "I had this small idea, which was to make Millie [Simmonds] the lead of the movie... her character opens the door to all the themes I was dealing with in the first movie." The film had its world premiere in March 2020, but due to the COVID-19 pandemic, its commercial release was postponed to May 2021. In the following August, Variety named Simmonds among over 50 other 25-and-under talent in its 2021 Power of Young Hollywood Impact List.

=== Grey House, Pretty Lethal, and projects in development ===
Simmonds starred in the short film Bumblebees which premiered on June 11, 2022, at Tribeca Film Festival. She also had her Broadway debut in the Broadway adaptation of Levi Holloway's play Grey House, which premiered on May 30, 2023. Simmonds said that acting on Broadway demands more exaggerated expressions than in film or TV, due to the need for audience visibility. She also contrasted the repetitive nature of stage performances with the varying day-to-day scenes in film and TV. Entertainment Weekly's Emlyn Travis wrote, "Simmonds, who is deaf, performs the tunes in American Sign Language alongside her costars, who... also sign with and interpret for her character throughout the performance in an excellent display of representation and accessibility on stage." Grey House closed on July 30, 2023, due to low ticket sales.

In July 2021, Simmonds partnered with Circle of Confusion Television Studios to star in and executive produce a TV adaptation of the 2022 deaf-themed book True Biz by Sara Nović. In the following October, Simmonds was cast as the deafblind historical figure Helen Keller for the film Helen & Teacher with principal photography planned at the time to start in mid-2022. Neither project has yet moved past the development stage.

In February 2023, Simmonds was cast in the action-thriller film Pretty Lethal. For her ballerina role, she trained at Ballet West Academy in Salt Lake City, Utah for several months, with tapping in rhythm to music to help guide her. In Budapest, before the start of filming, she and the rest of the cast went through a ballet bootcamp. The film was released in March 2026.

By March 2026, Simmonds was cast in A Quiet Place Part III, reprising her role from the first two parts. She was also cast with Noomi Rapace in the horror thriller film No Man's Land due to begin filming in April 2026. In the following May, she was cast in the French Revolution-set film Vermilion alongside Isabella Rossellini and Emma Laird, with the film to be directed by Jon Amiel.

== Deaf advocacy ==
Following Simmonds's 2017 debut in Wonderstruck, a Utah-based news outlet reported, "Millie plans to continue both acting and advocating for the deaf community." In 2019, after starring in A Quiet Place, Simmonds received the Greenwich International Film Festival's Make An Impact Award and participated in the festival's panel to discuss cinematic representation of people with disabilities.

In 2020, with the commercial release of A Quiet Place Part II being postponed to the following year due to the COVID-19 pandemic, Simmonds and a speech-language pathology clinical fellow designed a face mask that includes a transparent panel to allow lip-reading and facial expressions to be seen. Simmonds partnered with fair-trade fashion brand Rafi Nova to make the masks and to have net proceeds go to deaf and hard-of-hearing organizations. She also participated in a virtual panel hosted by the Academy of Motion Picture Arts and Sciences about representation of creative figures with disabilities, as part of the 30th anniversary of the Americans with Disabilities Act of 1990. Toward the end of the year, the teenage magazine Seventeen recognized Simmonds among 15 recipients of Voices of the Year 2020 for their vision and activism.

With deaf characters historically played by hearing actors, or sign language obscured by the editing process, Simmonds said in 2021 that she considers her films Wonderstruck, A Quiet Place, and A Quiet Place Part II as "a corrective" to that history. In 2022, Simmonds partnered with Cut + Clarity to create the "Millie ASL Mama" necklace, which features the ASL sign for "mother", to benefit the Deaf Mentor Program at Ski-Hi Institute. In a 2023 interview, she advised young deaf individuals aspiring to enter the entertainment industry to advocate for themselves and clearly communicate their needs.

In March 2024, Simmonds was among eight honorees at the New York Women in Film & Television's 44th annual Muse Awards.

== Credits ==
Simmonds's credits
Year(s)	Title	Medium	Role	Notes	Ref.
2017	Wonderstruck	Film	Rose		
2018	A Quiet Place	Film	Regan Abbott		
2018–2019	Andi Mack	Television	Libby	Season 3; two-episode arc	
2019	"Wanted a Name"	Music video	Self	Music video by Frenship	
2019	This Close	Television	Emmaline	Season 2; Episode: "No Place Like Home"	
2020	"I Dare You"	Music video	Self	Music video by Kelly Clarkson	
2020	A Quiet Place Part II	Film	Regan Abbott	Commercial release in 2021	
2022	Bumblebees	Short film	Athena		
2023	Grey House	Stage	Bernie	Broadway adaptation	
2026	Pretty Lethal	Film	Chloe		
2027	A Quiet Place Part III	Film	Regan Abbott	Filming	
TBD	Alone	Short film	Samantha	Post-production	

== Accolades ==
Simmonds's accolades
Year	Film	Award	Ceremony	Result	Ref.
2017	Wonderstruck	Critics' Choice Movie Award for Best Young Performer	January 11, 2018	Nominated	
2017	Wonderstruck	Florida Film Critics Circle's Pauline Kael Breakout Award	December 23, 2017	Nominated	
2017	Wonderstruck	Saturn Award for Best Performance by a Younger Actor	June 17, 2018	Nominated	
2017	Wonderstruck	Seattle Film Critics Society Award for Best Youth Performance	December 18, 2017	Nominated	
2017	Wonderstruck	Washington D.C. Area Film Critics Association Award for Best Youth Performance	December 8, 2017	Nominated	
2017	Wonderstruck	Women Film Critics Circle Award for Best Young Actress	December 22, 2017	Nominated	
2018	A Quiet Place	Critics' Choice Movie Award for Best Young Performer	January 13, 2019	Nominated	
2018	A Quiet Place	Los Angeles Online Film Critics Society Award for Best Performance by an Actress 23 and Under	January 9, 2019	Nominated	
2018	A Quiet Place	Seattle Film Critics Society Award for Best Youth Performance	December 17, 2018	Nominated	
2018	A Quiet Place	Washington D.C. Area Film Critics Association Award for Best Youth Performance	December 3, 2018	Nominated	
2020	A Quiet Place Part II	Critics' Choice Super Award for Best Actress in a Horror Movie	March 17, 2022	Nominated	
2020	A Quiet Place Part II	Fangoria Chainsaw Award for Best Supporting Performance	May 15, 2022	Won	
2020	A Quiet Place Part II	Hollywood Critics Association Midseason Award for Best Actress	July 2, 2021	Won	
2020	A Quiet Place Part II	MTV Movie Award for Most Frightened Performance	June 5, 2022	Nominated	
2020	A Quiet Place Part II	Saturn Award for Best Performance by a Younger Actor	October 25, 2022	Nominated	
2022		BAFTA Rising Star Award	March 13, 2022	Nominated	
