= Sign-language media =

Sign-language media are media based on a media system for sign languages. Interfaces in sign-language media are built on the complex grammar structure of sign languages. Generally media are built for oral languages or written languages, and are often not compatible with sign languages.

Sign-language media have specific characteristics:

- Sound is absent, or on very low frequencies (bass).
- No, or very little, text is used.
- A specific camera frame for close-ups.

== Milestones ==
- Analog era:
  - Film - Sign-language media is born. The first sign-language film is created in 1902.
  - Video - Sign-language magazines on video are distributed.
- Digital era:
  - Digital video and software - Sign-language interfaces are created to browse content.
  - World Wide Web - Information in sign language becomes available for everyone.
  - The videophone and webcam - Sign-language telecommunication becomes possible.
  - Mobile videotelephony - UMTS provides support for sign-language telecommunications.
  - Vlogs - Sign-language newssites start booming with the protest against Jane Fernandes.
  - Production of sign-language videos using computer-generated avatars instead of images of a real person.
  - Sign-language videos in various form of signs are being produced using a real sign-language interpreters
  - Sign language can be shown in movie theaters via a second screen mounted on the chair, playing a Sign Language Video track synchronized with the film.
