= A Quiet Place: Day One =

2024 film by Michael Sarnoski

- Theatrical release poster
- Directed by: Michael Sarnoski
- Screenplay by: Michael Sarnoski
- Story by: John Krasinski; Michael Sarnoski
- Based on: A Quiet Place by: Bryan Woods; and Scott Beck
- Produced by: Michael Bay; Andrew Form; Brad Fuller; John Krasinski
- Starring: Lupita Nyong'o; Joseph Quinn; Djimon Hounsou
- Cinematography: Pat Scola
- Edited by: Gregory Plotkin; Andrew Mondshein
- Music by: Alexis Grapsas
- Production companies: Paramount Pictures; Platinum Dunes; Sunday Night Productions
- Distributed by: Paramount Pictures
- Release dates: June 26, 2024 (Tribeca); June 28, 2024 (United States)
- Running time: 99 minutes
- Country: United States
- Language: English
- Budget: $67 million
- Box office: $261.9 million

A Quiet Place: Day One is a 2024 American apocalyptic horror film written and directed by Michael Sarnoski, based on a story he conceived with John Krasinski. It is the third installment in the A Quiet Place film series, and a prequel spinoff of the first film. Day One stars Lupita Nyong'o as a terminally ill woman during the early stages of an invasion in New York City by blind extraterrestrial creatures with an acute sense of hearing. The supporting cast includes Joseph Quinn and Djimon Hounsou, who reprises his role from A Quiet Place Part II.

Development on A Quiet Place: Day One began in November 2020, with Jeff Nichols set to write and direct. Despite a completed script, Nichols dropped out of the film in October 2021. In January 2022, Sarnoski was announced to replace Nichols as writer and director; he was approached by Krasinski because of his feature directorial debut Pig (2021). Principal photography took place from February 2023 to April 2023 in London, England.

A Quiet Place: Day One premiered at the Tribeca Festival on June 26, 2024, and was released in the United States by Paramount Pictures on June 28. The film received generally positive reviews from critics and grossed $261.9 million worldwide on a $67 million production budget.

== Plot ==
Sam, a terminally ill cancer patient, lives at a hospice outside New York City with her cat, Frodo. Reuben, a nurse, convinces a reluctant Sam to join a group outing to a marionette show in Manhattan. While in the city, the group notices meteor-like objects falling from the sky. Shortly afterwards, alien creatures attack the gathered crowd and passersby. One creature hits a noisy ambulance, and the explosion knocks Sam unconscious.

Sam later wakes up inside the puppet theater with Frodo, Reuben, and other survivors, including Henri, who signals her to remain quiet. Announcements from US military helicopters warn civilians to stay silent and hidden until the authorities can rescue them. Sam then witnesses fighter jets bombing and destroying the bridges leading out of Manhattan, preventing the creatures from leaving the island. One of the survivors begins to panic, and Henri accidentally kills him while trying to keep him silent.

The power grid cuts out that night, causing the building's emergency generator to noisily activate. Reuben turns it off, but is attacked and killed by one of the creatures. A distraught Sam takes Frodo and leaves for Harlem. The military announces it is preparing to evacuate civilians by boat from the South Street Seaport, as the creatures are unable to swim. Groups of people start moving towards the evacuation point, but the noise alerts the creatures. Sam is separated from Frodo in the resulting stampede.

Eric, an English law student, escapes a flooded subway station and encounters Frodo, following him back to Sam. She tells Eric to go south to the evacuation point but Eric, in shock, follows Sam back to her apartment instead. While there, Eric learns Sam used to write poetry. The next morning, Sam leaves alone for Harlem, but Eric finds her and they continue their journey together. Sam accidentally alerts the creatures and they flee into a flooded subway. The pair is forced to wade through deep water and wake a dormant creature, but manage to escape and find refuge in a ruined church.

While Sam rests, Eric ventures out to get medication for her from a pharmacy. While retrieving Frodo from a construction site, he discovers a group of creatures led by a larger one feeding on the remains of an organic egg-like pod. Sam tells Eric that, as a child, she used to watch her late father play jazz at a club in Harlem. They would get pizza at Patsy's afterward, something that Sam is determined to do again before she dies. Eric fulfills Sam's wish by taking her to the club and, after finding that Patsy's has been destroyed, collects pizza from another store.

Eric and Sam see a boat in the river, filled with survivors escaping Manhattan. As the two head towards it, creatures start to congregate along the shore. Sam gives Eric her sweater and Frodo and then runs off to distract the creatures by setting off car alarms. Although the creatures nearly catch them after Eric accidentally kicks a soda can, he and Frodo escape by jumping into the water and swimming to the boat, which Henri has managed to reach as well. Eric then finds a note from Sam in her jacket, telling him to take care of Frodo and thanking him for reminding her to live.

Sam listens to Nina Simone's "Feeling Good" using her headphones while walking down a deserted street. Accepting her death, she smiles as she unplugs her headphones and lets the music blare, causing a creature to suddenly appear behind her.

== Cast ==
- Lupita Nyong'o as Samira ("Sam"), a cancer patient
- Joseph Quinn as Eric, a British law student that Sam befriends
- Alex Wolff as Reuben, a nurse at the hospice Sam is staying at
- Djimon Hounsou as Henri, (Note: Originally credited as "Man on the Island" in A Quiet Place Part II.) a survivor who becomes one of the few to reach the island
- Eliane Umuhire as Zena
- Ronnie Le Drew as Puppeteer

== Production ==
In November 2020, Paramount Pictures announced a spinoff film set within the same world as A Quiet Place (2018), with Jeff Nichols set to write and direct, based on a story by John Krasinski. In May 2021, Krasinski disclosed that Nichols' completed script had been submitted to the studio. By October, however, Nichols dropped out of the film to focus on a different project at Paramount, and in January 2022, Michael Sarnoski was announced to replace Nichols as writer and director. Krasinski approached Sarnoski after seeing his indie feature directorial debut, Pig (2021). Day One is a co-production between Platinum Dunes and Sunday Night Productions, with Michael Bay, Andrew Form, Brad Fuller, and Krasinski producing. Sarnoski cited Children of Men (2006) as an inspiration for the film's look.

Lupita Nyong'o and Joseph Quinn came on board to star in November 2022. Nyong'o's character in the film, "Sam", has a cat, "Frodo". The actress had asked Sarnoski if they could change the animal due to a fear of cats, which she overcame with exposure therapy; by the end of production, she adopted a cat of her own. Paramount executives wanted Frodo to be computer-generated, but Sarnoski's insistence for a real cat changed their minds. Frodo was played by two cats named Nico and Schnitzel. The script originally depicted Frodo as hissing and arching its back, a natural reaction to feeling threatened, which animal handlers could not train the cats to do; to avoid scaring the cats or using CGI, those elements were removed. The character of Sam was inspired by Sarnoski's desire to subvert expectations of the genre by focusing on "someone who had a different relationship to death and survival". Sam and Frodo were named after Samwise Gamgee and Frodo Baggins, characters from The Lord of the Rings. Alex Wolff, who starred in Sarnoski's Pig, was cast in January 2023. Djimon Hounsou reprised his unnamed character from A Quiet Place Part II (2020), revealed to be named "Henri". Denis O'Hare was cast in an undisclosed role, but his character was cut from the final film.

Principal photography took place from February 6 to April 11, 2023, in London, though the film is set in New York City. Simon Bowles was the production designer, and Pat Scola, who shot Pig, served as cinematographer. The backlot at Warner Bros. Studios, Leavesden was used to recreate four NYC blocks, each two stories high, including Mott Street in Chinatown and parts of Harlem, the Lower East Side, and the Upper East Side. The exterior of Patsy's Pizzeria, a key location in the film, was recreated as part of the set, based on extensive photography by the production of the real restaurant in New York. The interiors of Loetta's Jazz Club were filmed at the George Tavern in Stepney. Bowles designed 3D models of his sets through SketchUp to allow Sarnoski and Scola to test angles beforehand. London Charing Cross was used to shoot the interiors of the subway sequence, while the exteriors were filmed at Canary Wharf tube station. The office building lobby chase was filmed at One Canada Square. The cathedral scene was shot at St. Sophia's Greek Orthodox Cathedral of Divine Wisdom.

Industrial Light & Magic completed the visual effects. The film's budget was $67 million.

=== Music ===
During post-production, Alexis Grapsas, who worked on Pig, composed the score.

== Release ==
The world premiere of A Quiet Place: Day One was held at the Tribeca Festival on June 26, 2024, as a special presentation taking place after the festival itself, which was held from June 5–16. It was released in the United States by Paramount Pictures on June 28, 2024. It was previously scheduled to be released on March 31, 2023, then on September 22, 2023, and on March 8, 2024. The film was released by Paramount Home Entertainment for digital download on July 30, 2024, and on DVD, Blu-ray, and Ultra HD Blu-ray on October 8, 2024.

== Reception ==
=== Box office ===
A Quiet Place: Day One grossed $139 million in the United States and Canada, and $122.9 million in other territories, for a worldwide total of $261.9 million. Deadline Hollywood calculated the film's net profit as $83.6 million.

In the United States and Canada, A Quiet Place: Day One was released alongside Horizon: An American Saga – Chapter 1, and was projected to gross $40–50 million from 3,707 theaters in its opening weekend. The film made $22.5 million on its first day, including $6.8 million from Thursday night previews, the best of the series. It went on to debut at $52.2 million, marking the best opening weekend of the franchise while finishing second behind holdover Inside Out 2. Anthony D'Alessandro of Deadline Hollywood attributed the accomplishment to heat waves prompting people to visit theaters, substantial walk-up business (66% of moviegoers bought tickets the day of their screening), and turnout from diverse audiences (of the opening weekend, 32% identified as Hispanic and Latino, higher than the first film's 28%). IMAX and Premium Large Formats (PLFs) accounted for 39% of the earnings, with IMAX specifically earning 11% of the weekend take. The film then made $20.6 million in its second weekend, finishing in third, and $11.4 million in its third weekend, finishing in fourth.

Internationally, the film earned $45.5 million from 59 overseas markets, a 4% increase over the opening weekend of Part II. The biggest markets were China ($9.8 million), Mexico ($4.7 million), the United Kingdom ($3.9 million), Australia ($2.6 million), and South Korea ($2.5 million).

=== Critical response ===
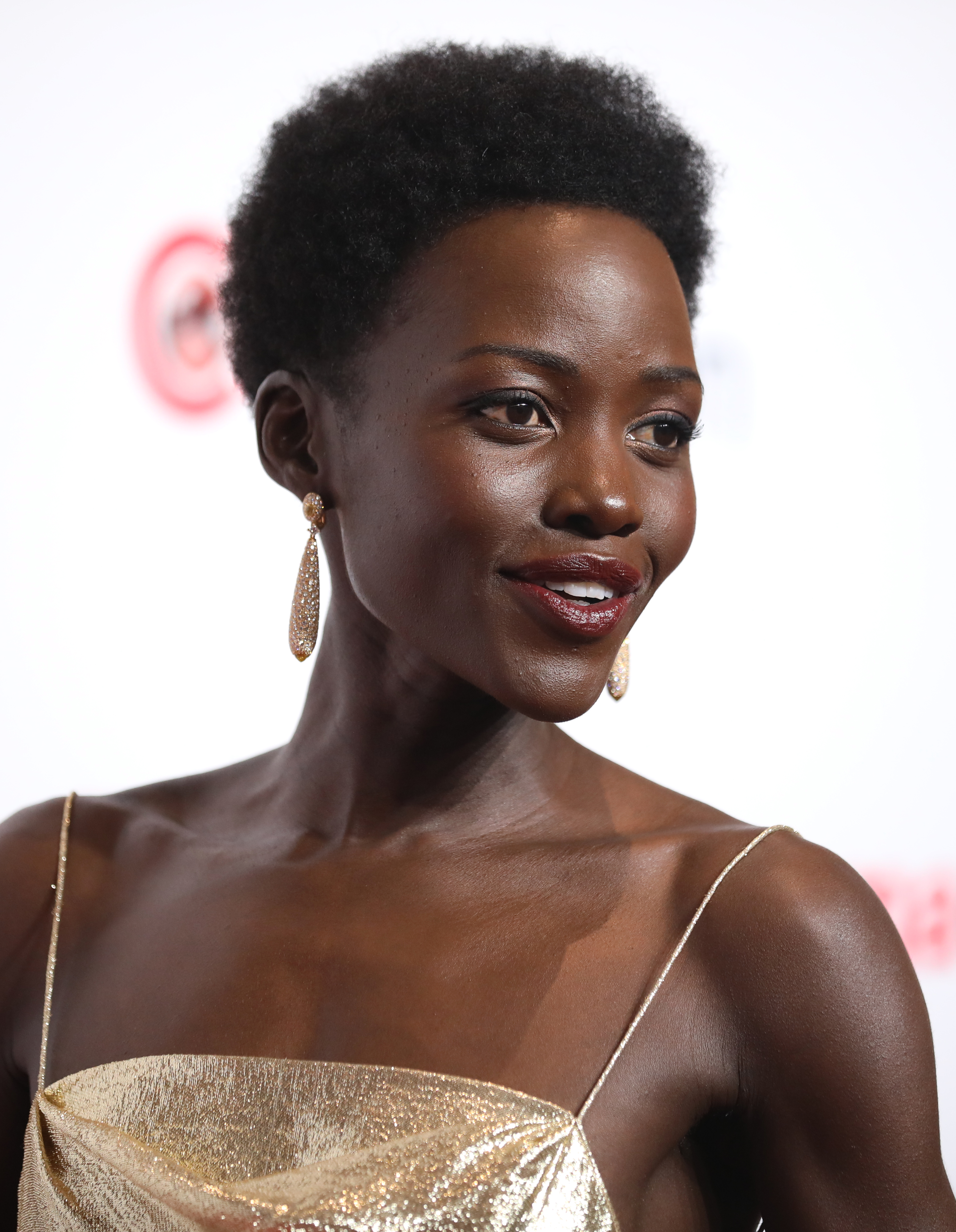
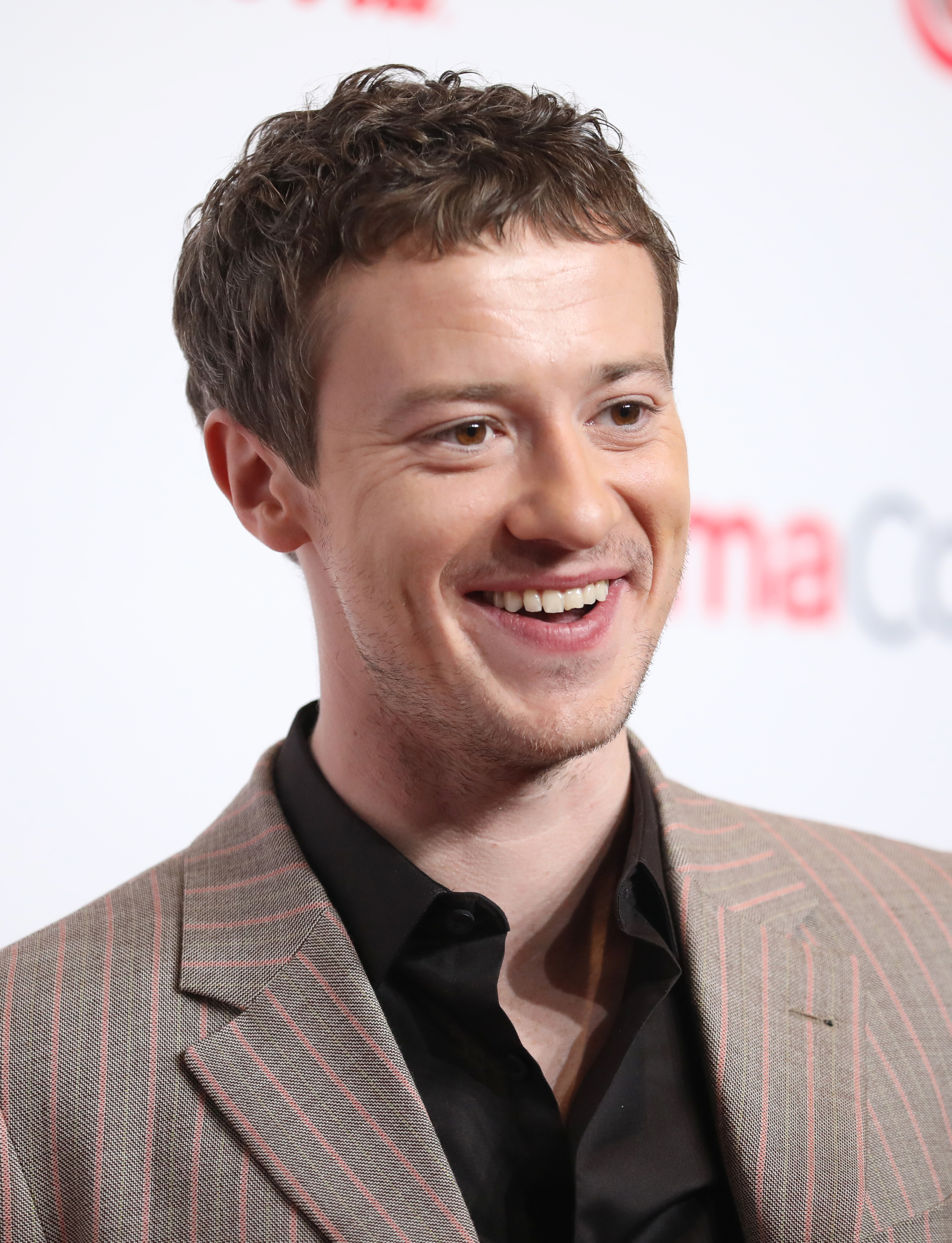
Nyong'o and Quinn were praised for their performances as Sam and Eric, respectively.

On the review aggregator website Rotten Tomatoes, 86% of 281 critics' reviews are positive, with an average rating of 7.1/10. The website's consensus reads: "Grounded in raw humanity by Lupita Nyong'o and Joseph Quinn, this sideways entry into A Quiet Place finds fresh notes of fright to play amongst the silence." According to the website, critics found the film tense though less terrifying than its predecessors, and praised the performances, including the cat Frodo. Metacritic, which uses a weighted average, assigned the film a score of 68 out of 100, based on 53 critics, indicating "generally favorable" reviews. Audiences surveyed by CinemaScore gave the film an average grade of "B+" on an A+ to F scale (the same score as the first film), while those surveyed by PostTrak gave it a 79% overall positive score, with 59% saying they would definitely recommend it.

Entertainment Weekly gave the film a B+, praising its emotional moments and Nyong'o's performance. A two-and-a-half star review at RogerEbert.com stated, "There are enough interesting ideas and at least two confident performances holding A Quiet Place: Day One together, even if it sometimes feels like a first draft of a richer, more complex final film." Rating it three out of five stars, Peter Bradshaw wrote for The Guardian: "It's an efficient, if familiar, spectacle of suspense." Variety's Peter Debruge criticized that most of the film was "tiptoeing through a mostly off-screen apocalypse".

=== Accolades ===
Accolades received by A Quiet Place: Day One
Award	Date of ceremony	Category	Recipient(s)	Result	Ref.
Astra Film Awards	December 8, 2024	Best Performance in a Horror or Thriller	Lupita Nyong'o	Nominated	
Astra Creative Arts Awards	December 8, 2024	Best Sound	A Quiet Place: Day One	Nominated	
Astra Midseason Movie Awards	July 3, 2024	Best Horror	A Quiet Place: Day One	Won	
Fangoria Chainsaw Awards	October 13, 2024	Best Lead Performance	Lupita Nyong'o	Nominated	
Hollywood Music in Media Awards	November 20, 2024	Best Original Score – Horror/Thriller Film	Alexis Grapsas	Nominated	
Las Vegas Film Critics Society	December 14, 2024	Best Animal Performance	Frodo the Cat	Won	
NAACP Image Awards	February 22, 2025	Outstanding Actress in a Motion Picture	Lupita Nyong'o	Nominated	
Saturn Awards	February 2, 2025	Best Horror Film	A Quiet Place: Day One	Nominated	
Saturn Awards	February 2, 2025	Best Actress in a Film	Lupita Nyong'o	Nominated	
