= Michael Bay's unrealized projects =

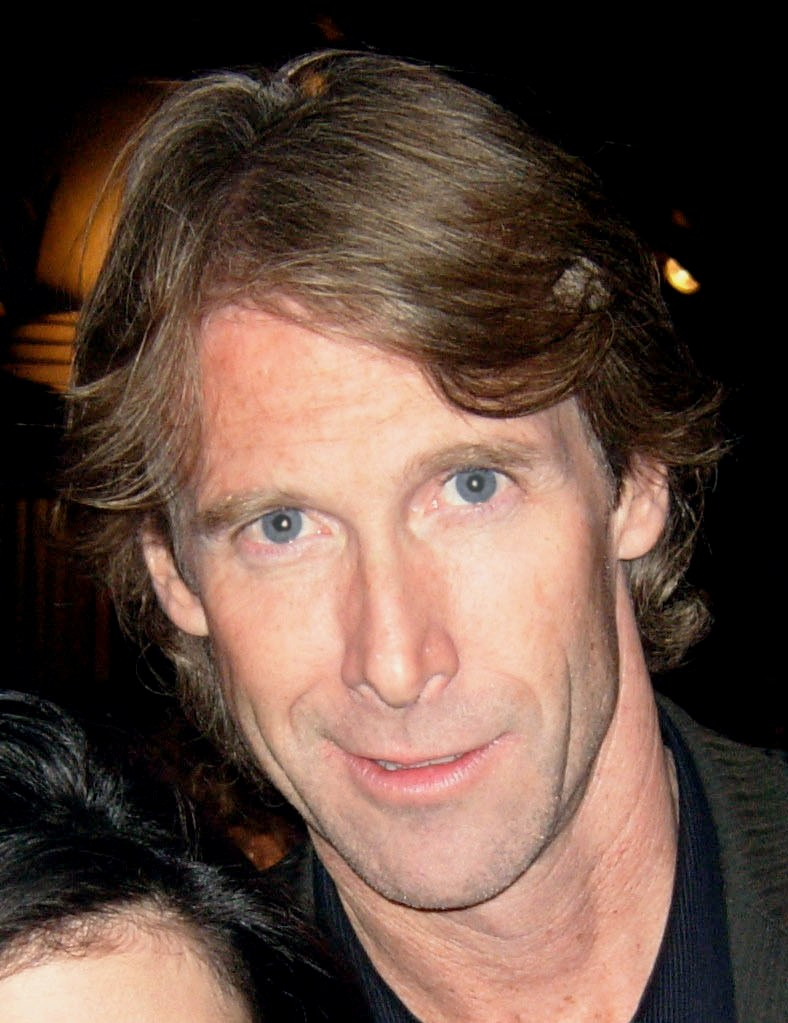
Bay, pictured in 2008

During his career, American film director and producer Michael Bay has worked on a number of projects which never progressed beyond the pre-production stage. Some of these projects fell into development hell or were officially cancelled, while others were taken over and completed by other filmmakers.

== 1990s ==
=== Superman Lives ===
In 1998, Bay was reportedly among the many directors who were sought after to replace Tim Burton as director of Superman Lives, but he turned down the offer.

=== Quantico TV pilot ===
Also in 1998, it was reported that, under his new development deal at Walt Disney Studios, Bay's company would be developing the action drama series Quantico, about the FBI Academy in Quantico, Virginia. He was set to executive produce and potentially direct the pilot episode, which was scripted by Dario Scardapane. In 2000, Quantico was expected to be Bay's next project as director, and was planned to be made for Twentieth TV and FBC, though nothing came of it.

=== Phone Booth ===
In early 1999, Larry Cohen's thriller script of Phone Booth was initially set up for Bay to direct at Fox 2000. At the time, Will Smith was attached to star in the main role. Though Cohen had told Variety that Bay departed because he wanted to move the drama from its single phone booth location, the director would later deny it. "Will and I were ready to go, taking $500,000 each and backend, but we wanted Fox to put more money in the script to make the words better and the studio wouldn't", said Bay. "Every actor loved the idea, but if the words weren't there, that film wouldn't work". Phone Booth was eventually made with Joel Schumacher directing and Colin Farrell starring.

=== Africa ===
In June 1999, it was reported that Bay was nearing a deal to direct Africa, an epic written by Eric Roth about renowned archaeologist turned wildlife preservationist Richard Leakey. It was set up by Peters Entertainment at Columbia Pictures. Bay had also signed on to direct Pearl Harbor, then under the title Tennessee, and it was expected that either project could be his next film. However, in October the following year, Bay stated that he was dubious about taking on directing a film set in a foreign country: "After tourists were hacked to death in Rwanda, my girlfriend said no way. I don't want to rush into another big movie right now". In 2014, Angelina Jolie had become attached to direct Roth's script as her next film.

== 2000s ==
=== The Gory Details ===
In April 2000, Touchstone Pictures had purchased an idea for a black comedy entitled The Gory Details to be produced by Bay through his Disney-based company Bay Films and set to be written by Topper Lilien and Carroll Cartwright. The project reportedly revolved around the morbid world of crime scene cleanup. Though it had been said by October that Bay was potentially eyeing Gory Details as a directing vehicle, Variety estimated that it was unlikely he would take on another feature at the time due to a then-looming Screen Actors Guild strike.

=== Untitled kidnapping thriller film ===
In October 2000, Variety reported that Bay's company had acquired an untitled thriller that he and producer Jennifer Klein would develop as his next directing project. The script by Stuart Alexander was about the kidnapping of a high-powered attorney's wife; the ransom for her safe release being his suicide.

=== King Arthur ===
As early as December 2000, Bay was reportedly originally engaged to direct David Franzoni's script of King Arthur, but left the project due to budget concerns. Bay had allegedly developed the project for over five years.

=== The Rock sequel ===
On the Criterion audio commentary track for the 2001 DVD of The Rock, Bay stated that he had an idea for a follow-up/sequel that would pick up where the first film left off.

=== Do Not Go Gentle ===
In August 2003, Bay was attached to direct the Revolution Studios adventure drama Do Not Go Gentle, about a scientist at the Smithsonian who realizes his lifelong dream of space travel. Neil Tolkin was set to rewrite the script, which was originally written in 1995 by David and Peter Griffiths. The project had previously been set up at Warner Bros., with Sean Connery attached to star and Rob Cohen attached to direct. In December 2003, it was announced that Robert Schenkkan would rewrite the script. There have been no further announcements since.

=== 2012: The War for Souls ===
On 27 July 2007, it was announced that Bay would direct Warner Bros' film adaptation of Whitley Strieber's 2012: The War for Souls, from a script by Alex Kurtzman and Roberto Orci. There have been no further announcements since.

== 2010s ==
=== Ghost Recon ===
On 11 June 2013, Warner Bros and Platinum Dunes will be making the film and Michael Bay will produce and possibly direct the film, written by Matthew Federman and Stephen Scaia.

=== Untitled underwater adventure film ===
On 17 March 2014, it was announced that Bay would produce and possibly direct Tom Wheeler and Robbie Thompson's underwater adventure film through Platinum Dunes, along with Wheeler. There have been no further announcements since.

=== Time Salvager ===
In June 2015, it was announced that Bay would direct the film adaptation of Wesley Chu's first Time Salvager book, with Lorenzo di Bonaventura and Mark Vahradian producing. On 18 September 2017, Zak Olkewicz was hired to write the script. There have been no further announcements since.

=== Hunting El Chapo ===
In March 2017, it was reported that Bay was in talks to possibly direct or produce an adaptation of Hunting El Chapo: The Thrilling Inside Story of The American Lawman Who Captured The World's Most-Wanted Drug Lord for Sony.

=== Lobo ===
In February 2018, DC Films was eyeing Michael Bay to direct the film inspired by the success of Tim Miller's Deadpool film, but only if Bay agreed to direct within a budget under $200 million. There have been no further announcements since.

=== Robopocalypse ===
On March 7, 2018, Bay signed on to replace Steven Spielberg as the director of the Robopocalypse film adaptation.

=== Transformers: The Last Knight sequel ===
On February 16, 2018, senior designer of the brand John Warder confirmed that Hasbro's plans for a sequel to Transformers: The Last Knight had been postponed; on May 23, Paramount removed the sequel from their release schedule. In an interview with Slash Film on December 10, 2018, producer Lorenzo Di Bonaventura announced that there will continue to be further films in the series following the release of Bumblebee, acknowledging that the franchise will make some changes in their tone and style. In a March 2019 interview, while promoting Bumblebee in Japan, Di Bonaventura confirmed that sequels to both the solo movie and The Last Knight were in development. He said: "One is the latest in the main family series following Transformers: The Last Knight and the other is a sequel to Bumblebee". But, one month later, it was confirmed that a direct sequel to The Last Knight was no longer in development. On August 7, 2025, it was reported that Bay is working with Paramount to develop a new Transformers film. Following the formation of the Skydance Corporation in October 2026, it was announced that in addition to Bay entering negotiations to direct, Steven Spielberg, who served as executive producer in past installments, would serve as a creative input on the film as well with Jason Fuchs confirmed as writer that same day.

=== Black Five ===
In August 2019, Bay signed to direct the action film Black Five for Sony Pictures. However, the film, which was set to begin production in 2020, was put on hold because of the COVID-19 pandemic, and Bay subsequently moved on to direct Ambulance.

== 2020s ==
=== Untitled action drama series ===
In February 2023, Bay was hired to direct and executive produce an untitled action drama bounty hunter series for A&E Studios and Amazon Studios.

=== Barbaric TV series ===
On July 11, 2024, it was reported that Bay was in talks to direct Barbaric, an acerbic fantasy series for Netflix based on the best-selling Vault Comics title, with Sheldon Turner writing and executive producing the series, Sam Claflin attached to star and Patrick Stewart set for a voice performance; Barry Jossen and Tana Jamieson would produce through A&E Studios in collaboration with Vault Comics' F.J. DeSanto and Damian Wassel, Claflin, Luke Carroll & Michael Stevenson's Cusp Films, and Jennifer Klein & Turner's 100% Productions.

=== Fast and Loose ===
On October 7, 2024, Bay was set to direct Will Smith in the film Fast and Loose, with Chris Bremner and Eric Pearson writing the screenplay. By August 7, 2025, Bay had departed from the production over creative differences with Smith.

=== OutRun ===
On April 21, 2025, it was announced that Bay would direct and co-produce an adaptation of Out Run for Universal Pictures and Sega Sammy Group with Sydney Sweeney also set to co-produce the film.

=== Operation Epic Fury ===
On May 20, 2026,

== Producer only ==
=== The Changeling remake ===
In October 2006, a remake of The Changeling was announced as a co-production between film companies Rogue Pictures and Platinum Dunes. There have been no further announcements since.

=== Near Dark remake ===
In October 2006, a remake of Near Dark was announced as a co-production between film companies Rogue Pictures and Platinum Dunes. On January 29, 2008, Samuel Bayer was hired to direct the remake. In December 2008, Platinum Dunes producer Bradley Fuller stated that the project had been put on hold due to similarities in conception with Twilight, a film which also contained a romance between human and vampire characters.

=== Fiasco Heights ===
On 8 April 2007, it was announced that Bay, Chris Bender and JC Spink would produce the thriller Fiasco Heights, from a script by Kyle Ward through Platinum Dunes. There have been no further announcements since.

=== The Birds remake ===
In 2008, it was announced that Bay would produce a remake of The Birds through Platinum Dunes with Martin Campbell directing, Billy Ray and Peter Craig writing the screenplay, with Naomi Watts starring as Melanie Daniels for Universal Pictures. On 28 February 2014, Diederik Van Rooijen was set to direct the remake, with Jonathan Herman writing the script. However, the movie was revived as a BBC miniseries without Platinum Dunes.

=== The Butcherhouse Chronicles ===
On 6 October 2009, it was announced that Bay would produce Stephen Susco's thriller The Butcherhouse Chronicles through Platinum Dunes. There have been no further announcements since.

=== Property of the State ===
On 6 October 2009, it was announced that Bay would produce Howard Franklin's crime drama Property of the State through Platinum Dunes. There have been no further announcements since.

=== Existence 2.0 ===
On 16 March 2010, Bay was set to produce the adaptation of Nick Spencer and illustrator Ronald Salas' comic book series Existence 2.0 through his Platinum Dunes company, with Miles Millar and Alfred Gough to write the screenplay and Paramount Pictures distributing the movie. There have been no further announcements since.

=== The Monster Squad remake ===
On 18 March 2010, it was announced that Bay and Platinum Dunes would produce a remake of Fred Dekker's monster comedy film The Monster Squad from a script by Mark Gunn & Brian Gunn, with Rob Cohen set to direct the film for Paramount Pictures. In 2014, Platinum Dunes producers Brad Fuller and Andrew Form confirmed that the remake was no longer happening.

=== Heatseekers ===
On 27 April 2010, it was announced that Bay and Platinum Dunes would produce former attorney George Mahaffey's screenplay Heatseekers, an action film about a young ex-military pilot who infiltrates a gang of aerial "pirates" working out of Bangkok and takes part in an elaborate tower heist using powered gliders and parachutes for Paramount Pictures. On 15 January 2013, Timur Bekmambetov was set to direct and F. Scott Frazier will rewrite the script. There have been no further announcements since.

=== Gideon's Sword ===
On 24 May 2010, it was announced that Bay and Platinum Dunes would produce the film adaptation of Douglas Preston and Lincoln Child's novel Gideon's Sword for Paramount. On 28 September 2010, Chap Taylor was hired to write the script. There have been no further announcements since.

=== Confidential Alien ===
On 27 July 2010, it was announced that Bay would produce the sci-fi film Confidential Alien Project through Platinum Dunes, with Bobby Glickert writing and directing the film for Paramount Pictures. There have been no further announcements since.

=== I Am Number Four sequel ===
In February 2011, screenwriter Marti Noxon told Collider that plans for an imminent I Am Number Four sequel were shelved due to the disappointing performance of the first installment at the box office.

In 2013, director D. J. Caruso was asked if there are any possibilities that The Power of Six will get a movie adaptation. He replied: "There's been some talk in the past couple of months about trying to do something because there is this audience appetite out there [...]. Most of the people on Twitter that contact me from all over the world ask, "Where's the next movie?" I think DreamWorks is getting those too so it'll be interesting. I don't know if I'd be involved, but I know they're talking about it".

=== Untitled Taylor Lautner film ===
On 16 February 2011, Bay and Platinum Dunes were talking with Taylor Lautner about developing a movie for Lautner to star with a script from Jason Hall. There have been no further announcements since.

=== Inherit the Earth ===
On 22 February 2011, it was announced that Bay would produce the sci-fi film Inherit the Earth through Platinum Dunes, with JT Petty writing the film for Columbia Pictures. On 8 January 2015, Andrew Adamson was set to direct Inherit the Earth, with Oren Uziel writing the script. On 7 December 2016, Mike Flanagan replaced Adamson as director and would write a new script. On 21 August 2018, Kornél Mundruczó replaced Flanagan as director with his wife Kata Wéber writing a new script and without Platinum Dunes' involvement.

=== Cocaine Cowboys TV series ===
On 20 March 2011, HBO ordered Michelle Ashford's series Cocaine Cowboys; it was inspired by Billy Corben's 2006 documentary Cocaine Cowboys and would be executive-produced by Ashford, Bay and Jerry Bruckheimer. On 18 September 2014, TNT took over the project. Michael Stahl-David, Elizabeth Perkins, Kristen Hager, Kelsey Siepser, Adria Arjona, and Óscar Jaenada were cast as the leads. On 26 March 2015, TNT ordered the pilot to be redeveloped.

=== The Hauntrepreneur ===
On 27 May 2011, it was announced that Bay and Platinum Dunes would produce Scott Rosenberg's family fantasy script The Hauntrepreneur about a family hires a peculiar man, the Hauntrepreneur, to help them adjust to a new town for Paramount Pictures. On 25 January 2012, Russell Brand was set to play the Hauntrepreneur. There have been no further announcements since.

=== Outsiders TV series ===
On 20 October 2011, Bay's Platinum Dunes, Adam Glass and CBS Television Studios were producing Glass' drama Outsiders for The CW.

=== Lockdown ===
On 9 March 2012, it was announced that Bay and Benderspink would co-produce Greg Bishop and Joe Ballarini's script Lockdown At Franklin High, about a monster attacking a high school for Columbia Pictures. On 4 November 2013, animatics supervisor/lead storyboard artist Federico D'Alessandro was set to direct and rewrite the script. On 6 March 2015, Project Almanac writers Andrew Deutschman and Jason Pagan will rewrite the script to be a school shooting and D'Alessandro will not direct the movie. There have been no further announcements since.

=== The Rising ===
On 12 July 2012, it was announced that Bay would produce Soo Hugh's low-budget techno-thriller The Rising through Platinum Dunes for Paramount. There have been no further announcements since.

=== Occult TV pilot ===
On 11 September 2012, A&E ordered James Wong's supernatural crime drama Occult, which will be executive-produced by Bay through Platinum Dunes. Josh Lucas, Lynn Collins, Agnes Bruckner, Daniel Henney and Brennan Brown were cast as the leads. On 11 September 2013, A&E cancelled the project.

=== The Governess ===
On 7 January 2013, it was announced that Bay and Platinum Dunes would produce The Governess from Hanna screenwriter Seth Lockhead for Warner Bros. There have been no further announcements since.

=== Raindrop ===
On 4 September 2013, it was announced that Bay would produce Jason Pagan and Andrew Stark's handheld-camera thriller Raindrop through Platinum Dunes for Paramount. There have been no further announcements since.

=== Sabotage ===
On 10 October 2013, it was announced that Bay and Platinum Dunes would produce the film adaptation of Neal Bascomb's novel Sabotage, an action thriller about a scientist who exposes the Nazi's secret nuclear program. There have been no further announcements since.

=== The Farm TV series ===
On May 8, 2014, Bay was attached to produce Brandon Camp's supernatural horror-Western series The Farm, with Camp producing with Bay's Platinum Dunes company, Dawn Olmstead's Grady Girl Productions and Warner Horizon Television; the USA Network would broadcast the series.

=== Untitled third Teenage Mutant Ninja Turtles film ===
On August 16, 2014, Noel Fisher stated in an interview that he and the other Turtle actors have signed on for three more films. Megan Fox has also signed on for three films. On May 20, 2016, Tyler Perry said that, if a third film is to be made, his character, Baxter Stockman, would probably mutate into his fly form during the movie. Pete Ploszek has also expressed his interests in reprising his role in a third film as Leonardo. On October 29, 2016, producer Andrew Form indicated that no plans were underway for a third film, likely due to the second film's lower box office returns.

=== Cosmic Motors ===
On 29 August 2014, it was announced that Bay and Warner Bros would produce a Cosmic Motors film, based on Daniel Simon's concept art book from a script by Kyle Ward. There have been no further announcements since.

=== Untitled Rwanda Cycling film ===
On 4 June 2015, it was announced that Bay and Leonardo DiCaprio would produce Orlando von Einsiedel's Team Rwanda Cycling film. There have been no further announcements since.

=== Drone Warrior ===
On 12 May 2016, it was announced that Bay would produce a film based on Brett Velicovich's memoir Drone Warrior for Paramount Pictures. On 24 May 2017, Andy Bellin was hired to write the script. There have been no further announcements since.

=== Northeast Kingdom ===
On 24 October 2016, it was announced that Bay would produce Alex R. Johnson's revenge thriller Northeast Kingdom, with Johnson directing. There have been no further announcements since.

=== The Reckoning ===
On 25 October 2016, it was announced that Bay would produce Patrick Melton and Marcus Dunstan's untitled thriller through Platinum Dunes, with Michael Chaves directing. There have been no further announcements since.

=== Little America ===
On 25 January 2017, it was announced that Bay would produce Rowan Athale's action thriller spec script Little America through Platinum Dunes, with Athale directing; Universal Pictures was going to distribute. In 2020, Sylvester Stallone was set to star in Athale's Little America as well as produce, with Bay and AGC Studios to sell at the European Film Market to distributors instead of Universal; it was scheduled to begin production in California, but COVID-19 likely canceled filming.

=== Duke Nukem ===
On 22 January 2018, it was reported that Bay would produce a Duke Nukem movie through Platinum Dunes, with John Cena in talks to play Duke, in the vein of Deadpool, and was looking for a director and writer. On 10 June 2022, Legendary Pictures will produce the Duke Nukem movie with Josh Hearld, Jon Hurwitz and Hayden Schlossberg's Counterbalance Entertainment instead of Bay and Cena.

=== Life on Mars ===
On 11 April 2018, Bay signed on to produce the adaptation of Cecil Castellucci's short story We Have Always Lived on Mars, which is retitled Life on Mars, with John Krasinski directing and producing the movie.

=== I Am Yours ===
On 13 June 2018, it was announced Bay would co-produce Ryan Belenzon and Jeffrey Gelber's thriller I Am Yours, along with Tyler Perry. There have been no further announcements since.

=== Happy Anniversary ===
On 19 September 2018, it was announced that Bay would produce Holly Brix's home invasion script Happy Anniversary through Platinum Dunes. There have been no further announcements since.

== See also ==
- Michael Bay filmography
