= Sport of athletics =

Group of sporting events

Athletics
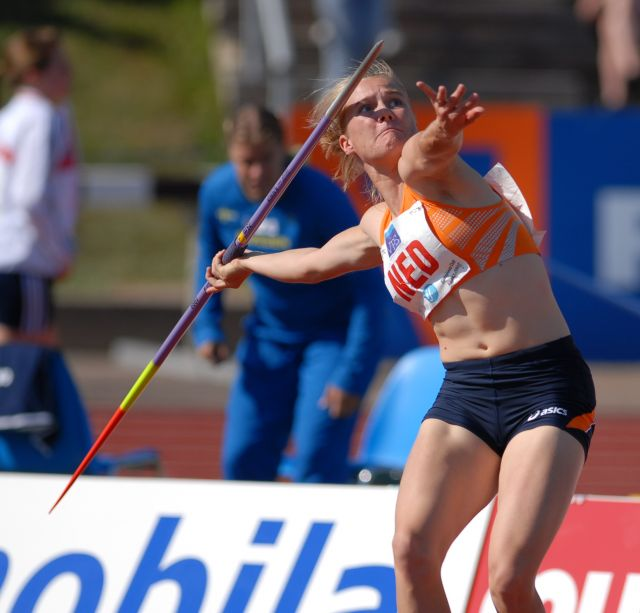
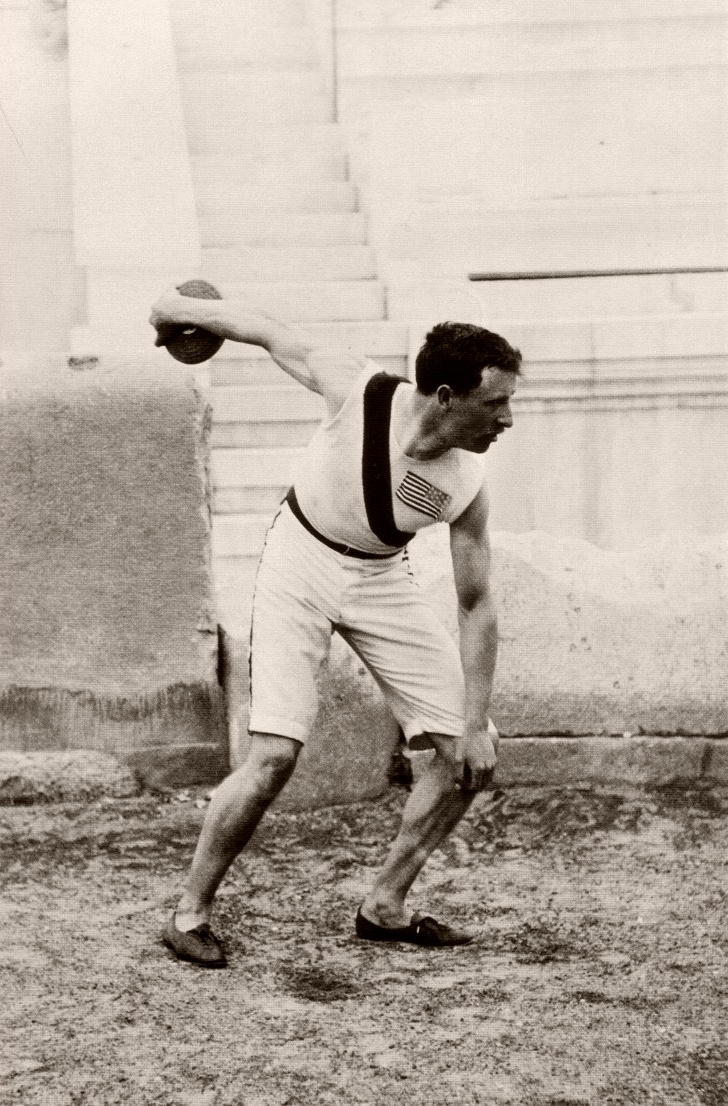
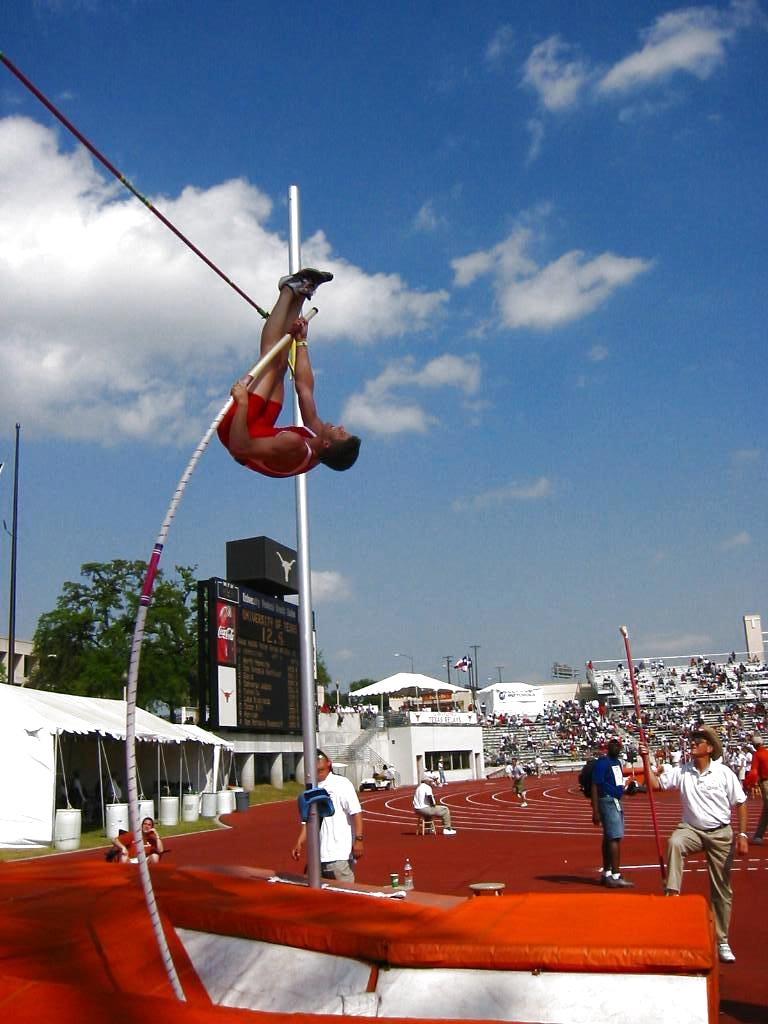
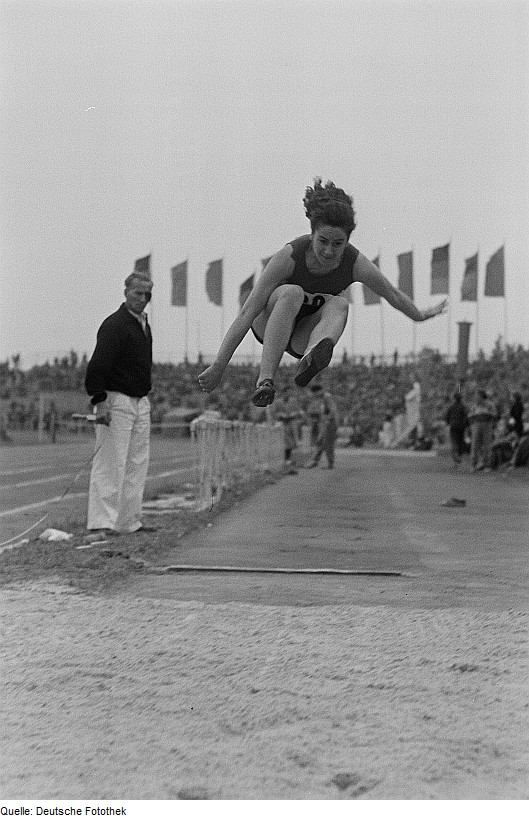
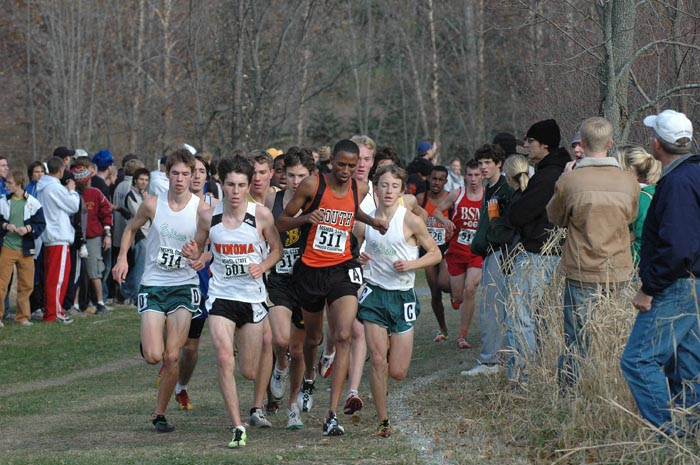
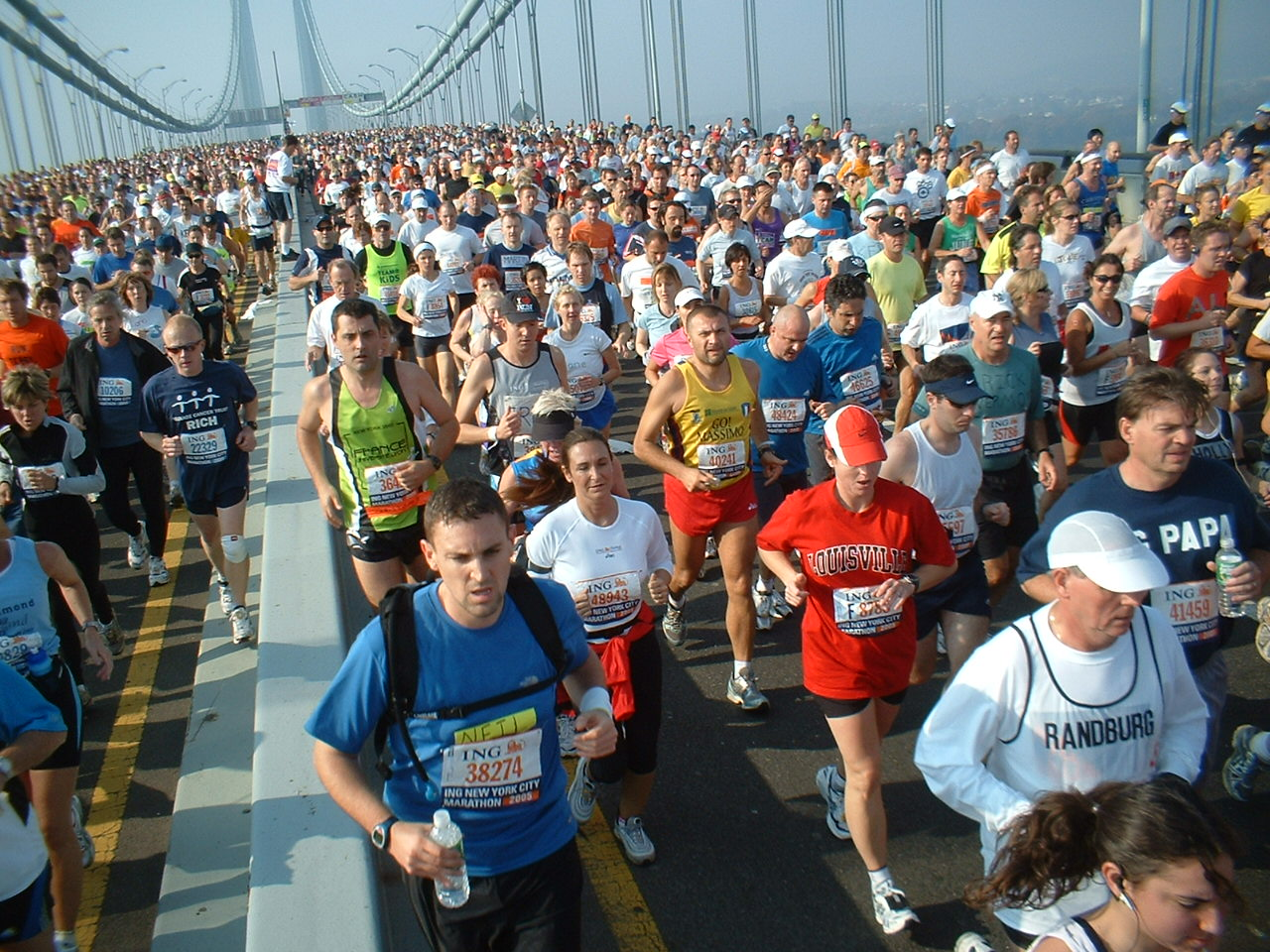
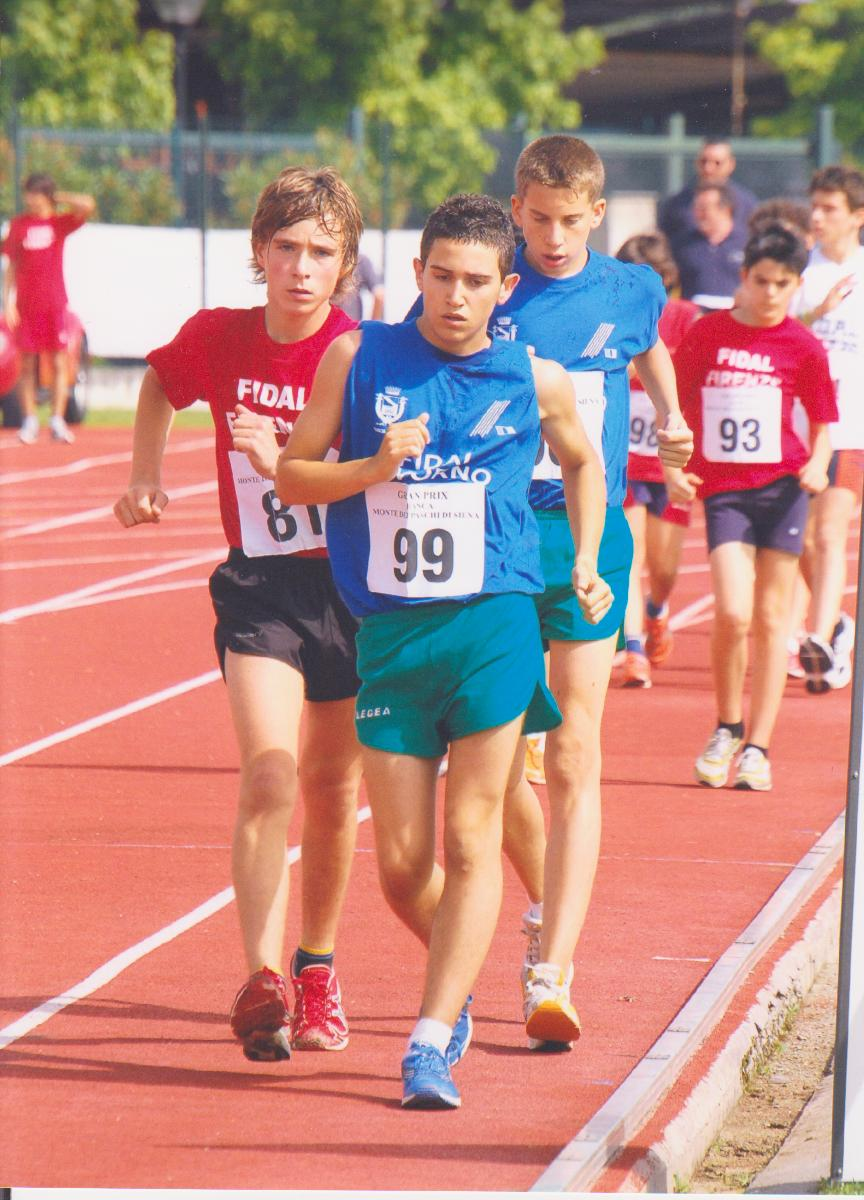
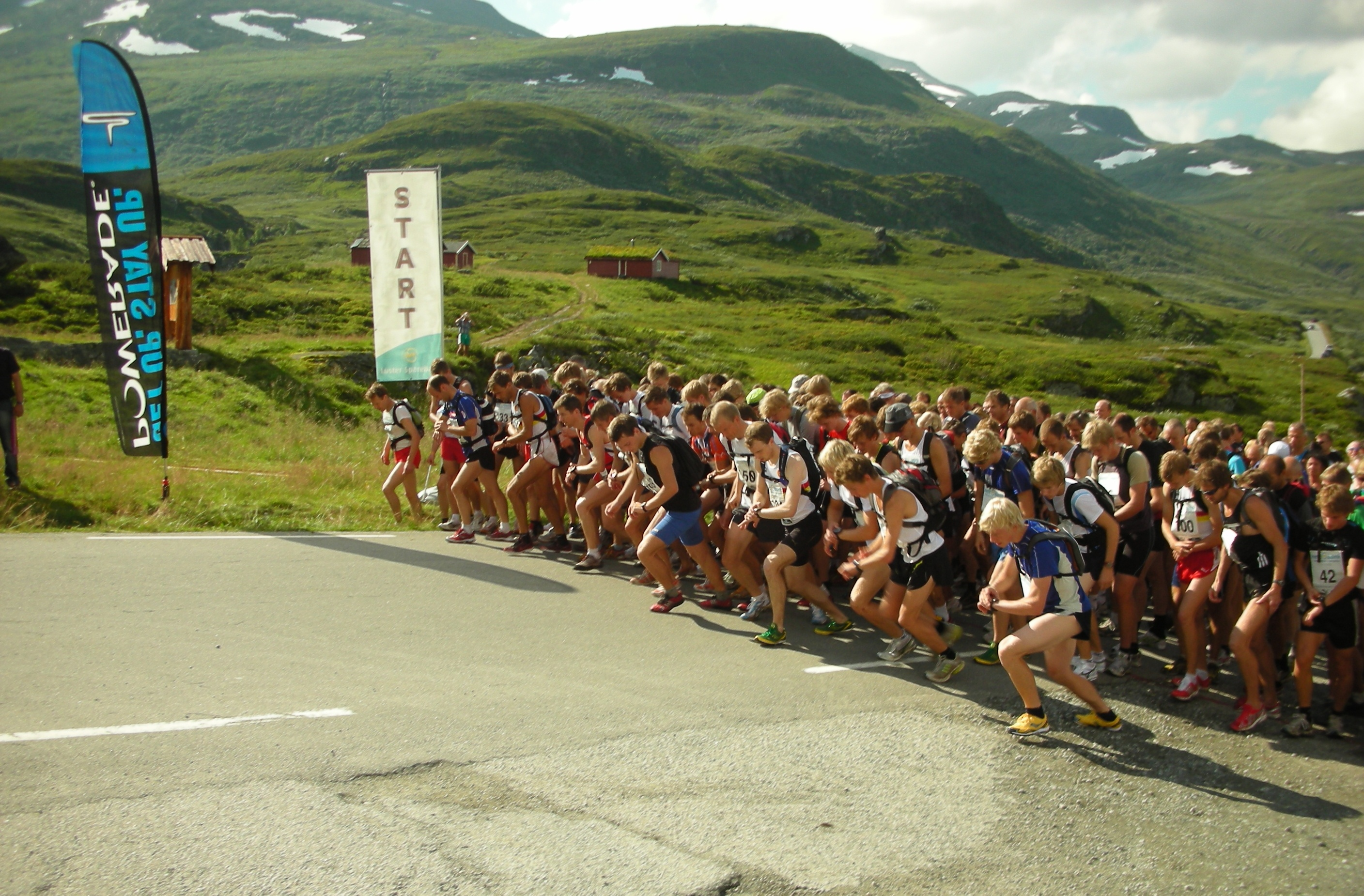
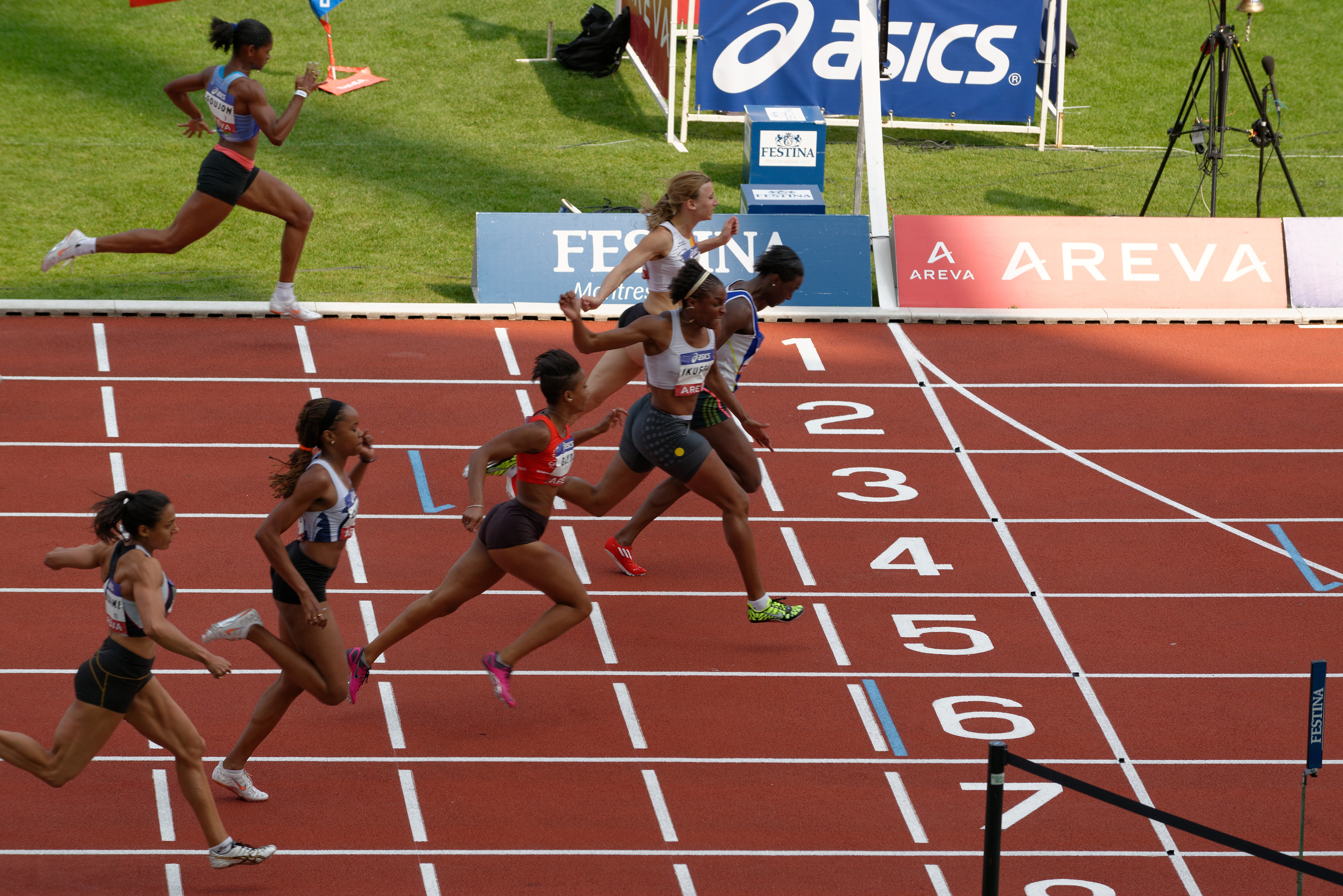
- Highest governing body: World Athletics

Characteristics
- Mixed-sex: Yes (Note: Most athletics competitions are single-sex, but mixed-sex athletics competitions are frequently held in road running and in Olympic events like the mixed 4 × 400 metres relay.)
- Type: Outdoor or indoor

Presence
- Olympic: Present since inaugural 1896 Olympics
- Paralympic: Present since inaugural 1960 Paralympics

Pictogram for Athletics at the Summer Olympics

Athletics is a group of sporting events involving competitive running, jumping and throwing. The most common types of athletics competitions are track and field, road running, cross-country running, and race walking.

The results of racing events are decided by finishing position (or time, where measured), while the jumps and throws are won by the athlete who achieves the highest or furthest measurement from a series of attempts. The simplicity of the competitions and the lack of need for expensive equipment make athletics one of the most widely practiced sports in the world. Athletics is mostly an individual sport, with the exception of relay races and competitions which combine athletes' performances for a team score, such as cross country.

Organized athletics are traced back to the ancient Olympic Games from 776 BC. The rules and format of the modern events in athletics were defined in Western Europe and North America in the 19th and early 20th century, and were then spread to other parts of the world. Most modern top level meetings are held under the auspices of World Athletics, the global governing body for the sport of athletics, or its member continental and national federations.

The athletics meeting forms the backbone of the Summer Olympics and most other major multi-sport events. The foremost international athletics meeting is the World Athletics Championships, which incorporates track and field, marathon running and race walking. Other top level competitions in athletics include the World Athletics Indoor Championships, World Athletics Cross Country Championships and the World Athletics Road Running Championships. Athletes with a physical disability compete at the Summer Paralympics and the World Para Athletics Championships.

The most prestigious global season-long leagues in the sport are the Diamond League for track and field athletes, and the World Marathon Majors in marathon running.

The word athletics is derived from the Ancient Greek ἀθλητής (athlētēs, "combatant in public games") from ἆθλον (athlon, "prize") or ἆθλος (athlos, "competition"). Initially, the term described athletic contests in general – i.e. sporting competition based primarily on human physical feats. In the 19th century, the term athletics acquired a more narrow definition in Europe and came to describe sports involving competitive running, walking, jumping and throwing. This definition continues to be prominent in the United Kingdom and the former British Empire. Related words in Germanic and Romance languages also have a similar meaning.

In many parts of North America, the term athletics is commonly used to refer to sports in general, reflecting its historical usage. As a result, the word is rarely used in this region to specifically describe the sport of athletics. Instead, the term track and field is predominantly used in the United States and Canada to refer to athletics competitions. These events include running, jumping, throwing, race walking, and marathon running, while cross-country running is generally considered a separate sport.

Successful athletic performance is based on the athlete's ability to perform the event specific tasks of their discipline effectively and on an ability to recover energy quickly and efficiently i.e. immediately after an act of exertion. Longer term recovery is also of vital importance and involves optimising the factors of diet and sleep.

== History ==
=== Ancient ===
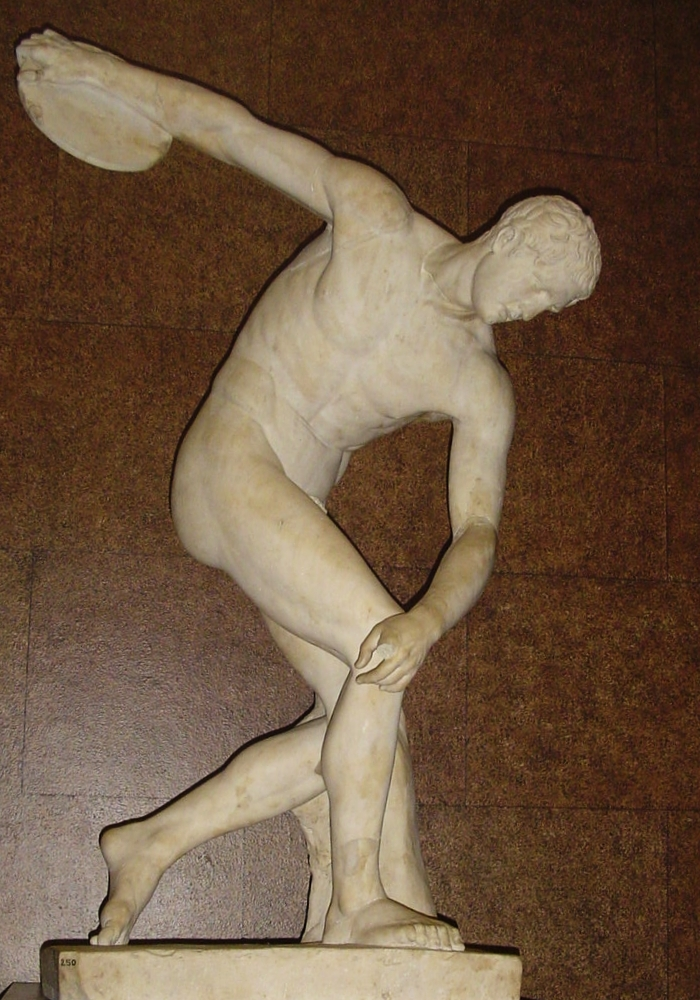
A copy of the Ancient Greek statue Discobolus, portraying a discus thrower

Athletic contests in running, walking, jumping and throwing are among the oldest of all sports and their roots are prehistoric. Athletics events were depicted in the Ancient Egyptian tombs in Saqqara, with illustrations of running at the Heb Sed festival and high jumping appearing in tombs from as early as of 2250 BC. The Tailteann Games were an ancient Celtic festival in Ireland, founded c. 1800 BC, and the thirty-day meeting included running and stone-throwing among its sporting events. The original and only event at the first Olympics in 776 BC was a stadium-length running event known as the stadion. This later expanded to include throwing and jumping events within the ancient pentathlon. Athletics competitions also took place at other Panhellenic Games, which were founded later around 500 BC.

=== Modern era ===
The Cotswold Olympic Games, a sports festival which emerged in 17th century England, featured athletics in the form of sledgehammer throwing contests. Annually, from 1796 to 1798, L'Olympiade de la République was held in revolutionary France, and is an early forerunner to the modern Olympic Games. The premier event of this competition was a running event, but various ancient Greek disciplines were also on display. The 1796 Olympiade marked the introduction of the metric system into the sport.

Athletics competitions were held about 1812 at the Royal Military College, Sandhurst, and in 1840 at the Royal Shrewsbury School Hunt. The Royal Military Academy, Woolwich held an organised competition in 1849, and a regular series of closed meetings open only to undergraduates, was held by Exeter College, Oxford, from 1850. The annual Wenlock Olympian Games, first held in 1850 in Wenlock, England, incorporated athletics events into its sports programme.

The first modern athletics clubs in the world were founded at the University of Cambridge in 1857, and the University of Oxford in 1860; they began an annual varsity match in 1864. The London Athletic Club became the first independent athletic club in 1863. The first modern-style indoor athletics meetings were recorded shortly after in the 1860s, including a meet at Ashburnham Hall in London which featured four running events and a triple jump competition.

The Amateur Athletic Association (AAA) was established in England in 1880 as the first national body for the sport of athletics and began holding its own annual athletics competition – the AAA Championships. The United States also began holding an annual national competition – the USA Outdoor Track and Field Championships – first held in 1876 by the New York Athletic Club. Athletics became codified and standardized via the English AAA and other general sports organisations in the late 19th century, such as the Amateur Athletic Union (founded in the US in 1888) and the Union des sociétés françaises de sports athlétiques (founded in France in 1889).

An athletics competition was included in the first modern Olympic Games in 1896 and it has been as one of the foremost competitions at the quadrennial multi-sport event ever since. Originally for men only, the 1928 Olympics saw the introduction of women's events in the athletics programme. Athletics is part of the Paralympic Games since the inaugural Games in 1960. Athletics has a very high-profile during major championships, especially the Olympics, even among casual sports fans, but otherwise is less popular though it maintains a dedicate fan base. Big city marathons such as New York, Boston, Chicago, London and Tokyo are major televised events in their respective cities, and often attract thousands of entrants and tens of thousands of spectators, for whom the event is usually free as it takes place on normal city roads. A small number of half marathons and road mile races, including the Great North Run, attract similar attention.

An international governing body, the International Amateur Athletics Federation (IAAF), was founded in 1912. It enforced amateur sport status on competitions during much of the 20th century. Professional competition continued at a low level, becoming increasingly more common as the century progressed. The International Track Association briefly formed a professional track and field circuit in the United States in the 1970s. Athletes used their increasing status to push for remuneration and the IAAF responded with the IAAF Golden Events series and the establishment an outdoor World Championships in 1983, including track and field, racewalking and a marathon event. In modern times, athletes can receive money for racing, putting an end to the so-called "amateurism" that existed before. The global body updated the name to the International Association of Athletics Federations in 2001, moving away from its amateur origins, before taking on its current name World Athletics in 2019.

The Comité International Sports des Sourds had been formed by 1922, to govern international deaf sports, including athletics.

The first organized international competitions for athletes with a physical disability (not deaf) began in 1952, when the first international Stoke Mandeville Games were organized for World War II veterans. This only included athletes in a wheelchair. This inspired the first Paralympic Games, held in 1960. Competitions would over time be expanded to include mainly athletes with amputation, cerebral palsy and visual impairment, in addition to wheelchair events.

== Events ==
World Athletics, the sport's governing body, defines athletics in six disciplines: track and field, road running, race walking, cross country running, mountain running, and trail running. Mountain running was added in 2003 and trail running was added in 2015.

All forms of athletics are individual sports with the exception of relay races. However, athletes' performances are often tallied together by country at international championships, and, in the case of cross country and road races, finishing positions or times of the top athletes from a team may be combined to declare a team victor.

Several further forms of competitive running exist outside of the governance of World Athletics. The International Skyrunning Federation (ISF) governs high-altitude mountain running, defined as skyrunning, and is affiliated with the International Climbing and Mountaineering Federation rather than World Athletics. Competitive stair climbing events, usually hosted in skyscrapers, has two common names: vertical running (as described by the ISF) and tower running (as described by the Towerrunning World Association). Snowshoe running is a winter sport governed by the World Snowshoe Federation, which is similarly to cross country running but has athletes wearing snowshoes to race over deep snow on an obstacle-free course. The International Association of Ultrarunners organises ultra running as an affiliate of World Athletics, but these long-distance forms of competition fit within World Athletics disciplines, albeit with additional distance.

Athletics, specifically the distance running discipline, also forms a significant portion of a number of other organised sports, most notable the triathlon family of sports and modern pentathlon. In both cases, the rules of the sport broadly mirror those of World Athletics, but the details are set by the international federation of the sports themselves.

=== Track and field ===
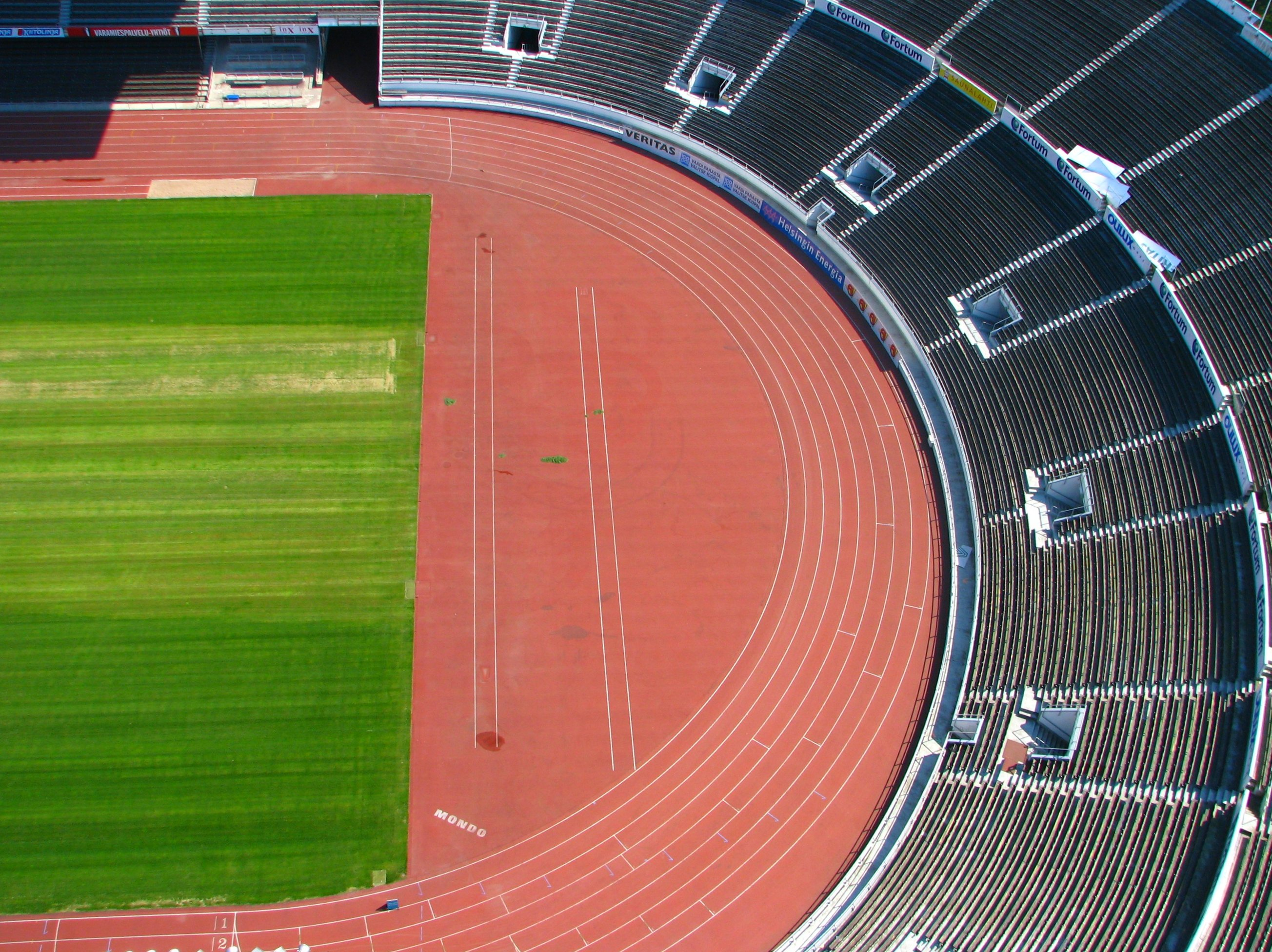
A typical athletics stadium with an oval running track and a grassy inner field

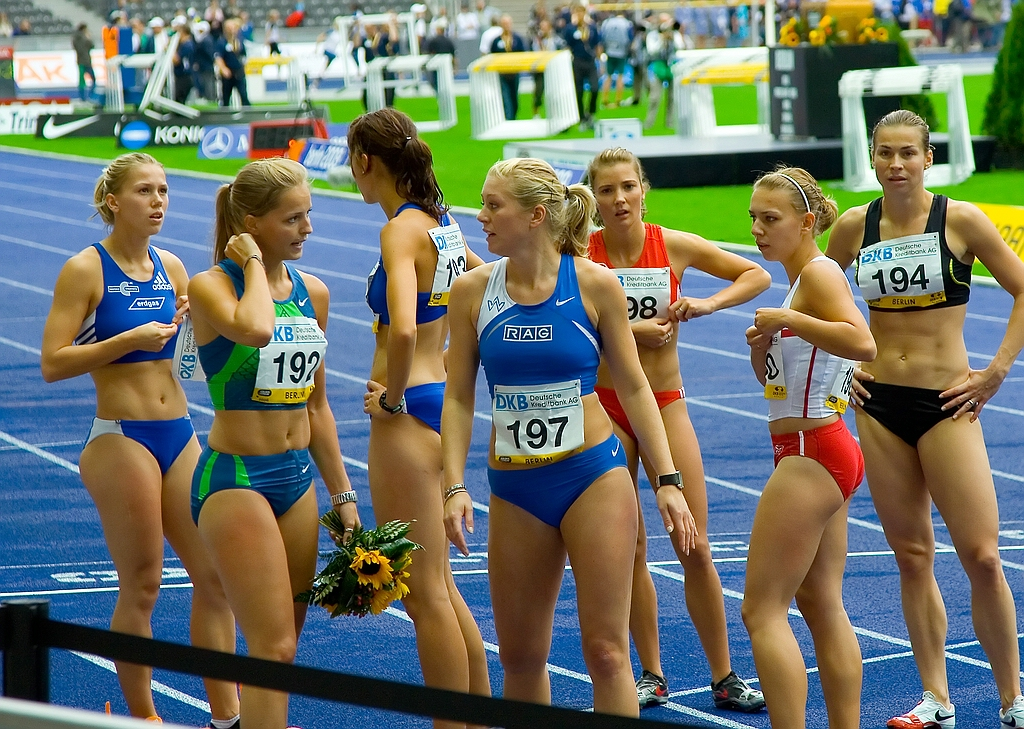
International level women athletes at ISTAF Berlin, 2006

Track and field competitions emerged in the late 19th century and were typically contested between athletes who were representing rival educational institutions, military organisations and sports clubs. Participating athletes may compete in one or more events, according to their specialities. Men and women compete separately. Track and field comes in both indoor and outdoor formats, with most indoor competitions occurring in winter, while outdoor events are mostly held in summer. The sport is defined by the venue in which the competitions are held – the athletics stadium.

A variety of running events are held on the track which fall into three broad distance categories: sprints, middle-distance, and long-distance track events. Relay races feature teams comprising four runners each, who must pass a baton to their teammate after a specified distance with the aim of being the first team to finish. Hurdling events and the steeplechase are a variation upon the flat running theme in that athletes must clear obstacles on the track during the race. The field events come in two types – jumping and throwing competitions. In throwing events, athletes are measured by how far they hurl an implement, with the common events being the shot put, discus, javelin, and hammer throw. There are four common jumping events: the long jump and triple jump are contests measuring the horizontal distance an athlete can jump, while the high jump and pole vault are decided on the height achieved. Combined events, which include the decathlon (typically competed by men) and heptathlon (typically competed by women), are competitions where athletes compete in a number of different track and field events, with each performance going toward a final points tally.

The most prestigious track and field contests occur within athletics championships and athletics programmes at multi-sport events. The Olympic athletics competition and World Championships in Athletics, and the Paralympic athletics competition and World Para Athletics Championships, are the highest and most prestigious levels of competition in track and field. Track and field events have become the most prominent part of major athletics championships and many famous athletes within the sport of athletics come from this discipline. Discrete track and field competitions are found at national championships-level and also at annual, invitational track and field meets. Meetings range from elite competitions – such as those in the IAAF Diamond League series – to basic all comers track meets, inter-sports club meetings and schools events, which form the grassroots of track and field.

Official world championship track and field events
Track					Field		Combined events
Sprints	Middle-distance	Long-distance	Hurdles	Relays	Jumps	Throws	Combined events
60 m 100 m 200 m 400 m	800 m 1500 m 3000 m	5000 m 10,000 m	60 m hurdles 100 m hurdles 110 m hurdles 400 m hurdles 3000 m steeplechase	4 × 100 m relay 4 × 400 m relay	Long jump Triple jump High jump Pole vault	Shot put Discus throw Hammer throw Javelin throw	Pentathlon; Heptathlon; Decathlon

- Note: Events in italics are competed at indoor world championships only
- Note: Heptathlon can refer to two different events, each consisting of different disciplines and both recognised by IAAF: the indoor heptathlon for men, and the outdoor heptathlon for women.

=== Road running ===
Road running competitions are running events (predominantly long distance) which are mainly conducted on courses of paved or tarmac roads, although major events often finish on the track of a main stadium. In addition to being a common recreational sport, the elite level of the sport – particularly marathon races – are one of the most popular aspects of athletics. Road racing events can be of virtually any distance, but the most common and well known are the marathon, half marathon, 10 km and 5 km. The marathon is the only road running event featured at the IAAF World Championships in Athletics and the Summer Olympics, although there is also an annual IAAF World Half Marathon Championships. The marathon is also the only road running event featured at the World Para Athletics Championships and the Summer Paralympics. The World Marathon Majors series includes the six most prestigious marathon competitions at the elite level – the Berlin, Boston, Chicago, London, New York City and Tokyo Marathons.

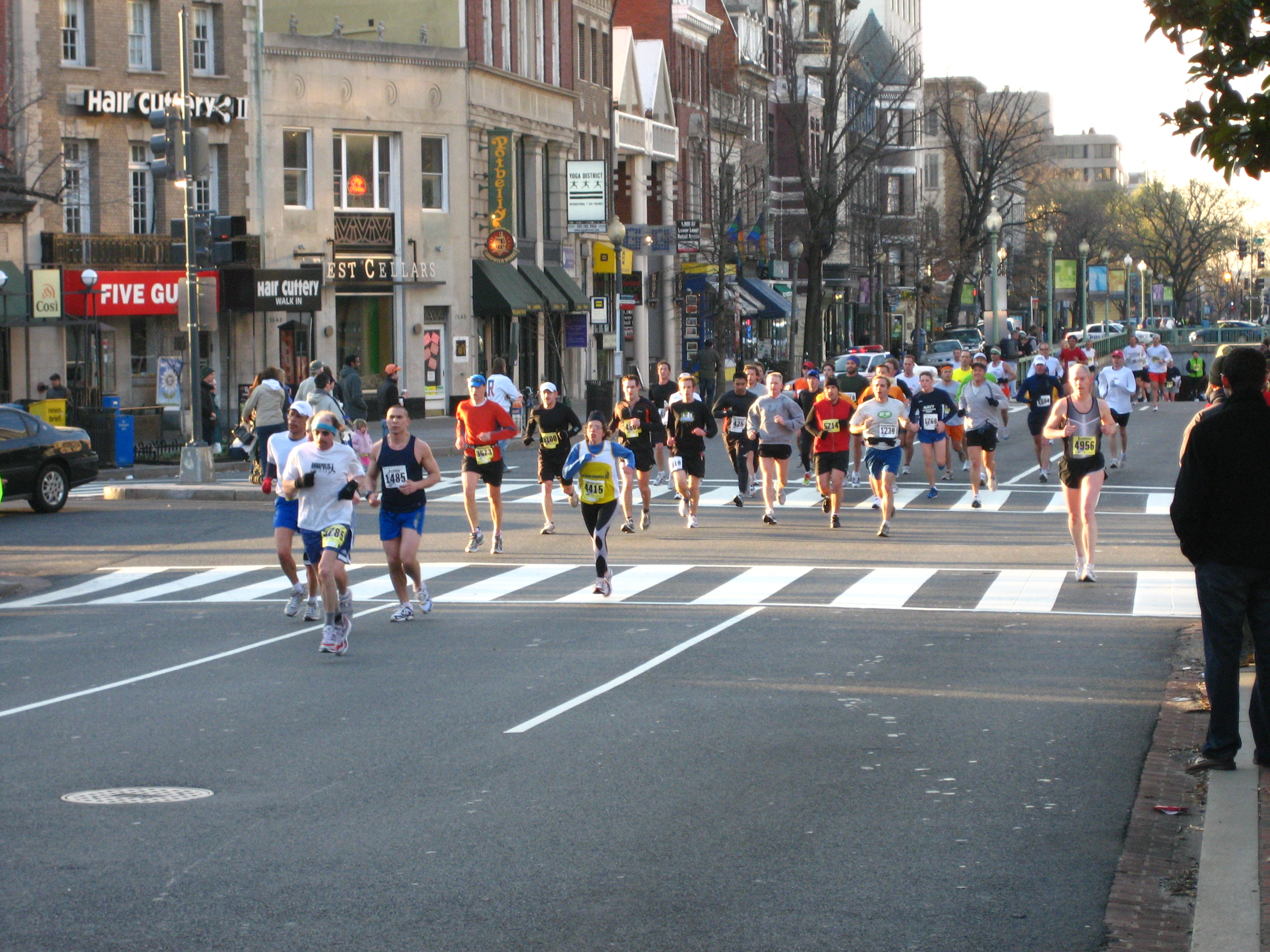
Runners in the popular National Marathon race in Washington, D.C.

The sport of road running finds its roots in the activities of footmen: male servants who ran alongside the carriages of aristocrats around the 18th century, and who also ran errands over distances for their masters. Foot racing competitions evolved from wagers between aristocrats, who pitted their footman against that of another aristocrat in order to determine a winner. The sport became professionalised as footmen were hired specifically on their athletic ability and began to devote their lives to training for the gambling events. The amateur sports movement in the late 19th century marginalised competitions based on the professional, gambling model. The 1896 Summer Olympics saw the birth of the modern marathon and the event led to the growth of road running competitions through annual events such as the Boston Marathon (first held in 1897) and the Lake Biwa Marathon and Fukuoka Marathons, which were established in the 1940s. The 1970s running boom in the United States made road running a common pastime and also increased its popularity at the elite level.

Ekiden contests – which originated in Japan and remain very popular there – are a relay race variation on the marathon, being in contrast to the typically individual sport of road running.

=== Cross country running ===
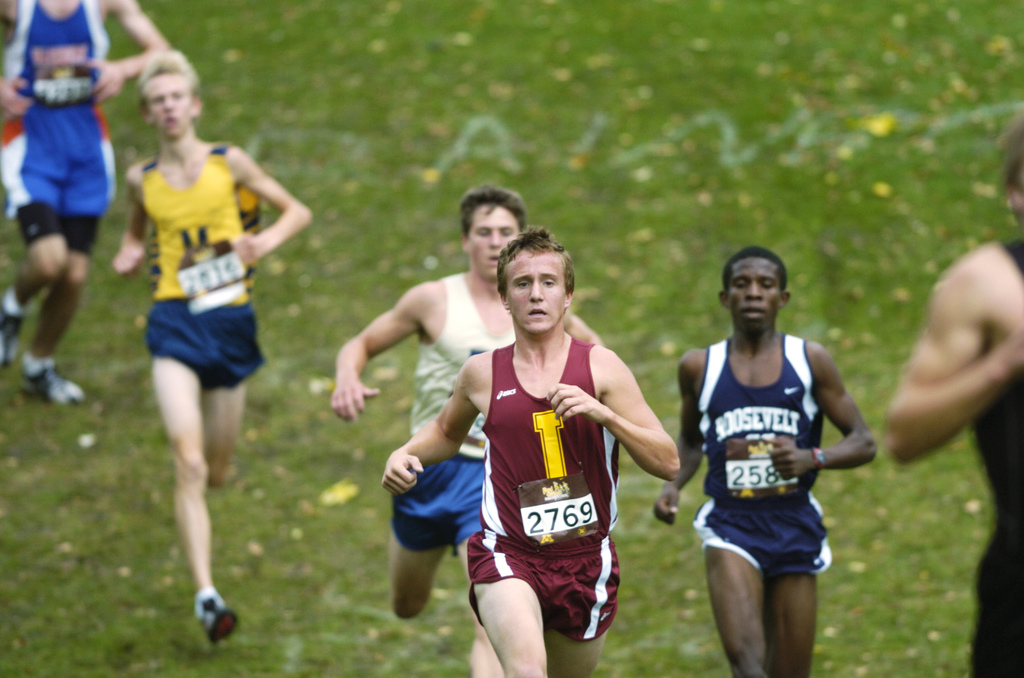
Competitors mid-race at a boys high school event in the United States

Cross country running is the most naturalistic of the sports in athletics as competitions take place on open-air courses over surfaces such as grass, woodland trails, and earth. It is both an individual and team sport, as runners are judged on an individual basis and a points scoring method is used for teams. Competitions are typically long distance races of 3 km (1.9 mi) or more which are usually held in autumn and winter. Cross country's most successful athletes often compete in long-distance track and road events as well.

The Crick Run in England in 1838 was the first recorded instance of an organised cross country competition. The sport gained popularity in British, then American schools in the 19th century and culminated in the creation of the first International Cross Country Championships in 1903. The annual IAAF World Cross Country Championships was inaugurated in 1973 and this remains the highest level of competition for the sport. A number of continental cross country competitions are held, with championships taking place in Asia, Europe, North America and South America. The sport has retained its status at the scholastic level, particularly in the United Kingdom and United States. At the professional level, the foremost competitions come under the banner of the IAAF Cross Country Permit Meetings.

While cross country competitions are no longer held at the Olympics, having featured in the athletics programme from 1912 to 1924, it has been present as one of the events within the modern pentathlon competition since the 1912 Summer Olympics. One variation on traditional cross country is mountain running, which incorporates significant uphill and downhill sections as an additional challenge to the course. Fell running and Orienteering are other competitive sports similar to cross country, although they feature an element of navigation which is absent from the set courses of cross country.

=== Racewalking ===
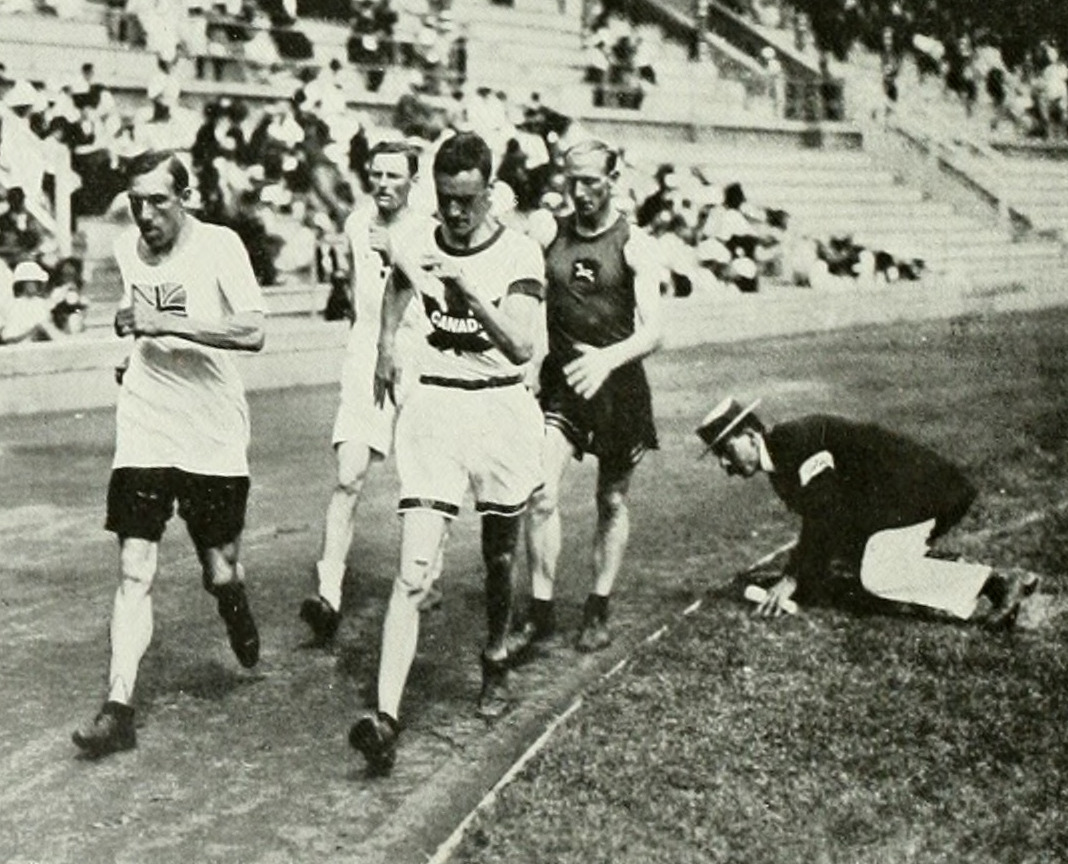
A track-side judge monitoring technique at the 1912 Summer Olympics in Stockholm, Sweden

Racewalking is a form of competitive walking that usually takes place on open-air roads, although running tracks are also occasionally used. Racewalking is the only sport in athletics in which judges monitor athletes on their technique. Racewalkers must always have a foot in contact with the ground and their advancing leg must be straightened, not bent at the knee – failure to follow these rules results in disqualification from the race.

Racewalking finds its roots in the sport of pedestrianism which emerged in the late 18th century in England. Spectators would gamble on the outcome of the walking competitions. The sport took on an endurance aspect and competitions were held over long distances or walkers would have to achieve a certain distance within a specified time frame, such as Centurion contests of walking 100 miles (160 km) within 24 hours. During this period, racewalking was frequently held on athletics tracks for ease of measurement, and the 1908 Summer Olympics in London saw the introduction of the 3500-metre and 10-mile walks. Racewalking was briefly dropped from the Olympic programme in 1928, but the men's 50 kilometres race walk has been held at every Olympic Games but one since 1932. The men's 20 kilometres race walk was added to the Olympic athletics schedule in 1956 and the women's event was first held in 1992. The most common events in modern competition are over 10 km, 20 km and 50 km on roads, although women's 3 km and men's 5 km are held on indoor tracks.

The highest level racewalking competitions occur at the IAAF World Championships in Athletics and at the Summer Olympics, although the sport also has its own separate major competition – the IAAF World Race Walking Cup – which has been held since 1961. The IAAF World Race Walking Challenge forms the primary seasonal competition – athletes earn points for their performances at ten selected racewalking competitions and the highest scoring walkers are entered into that year's IAAF Race Walking Challenge Final.

== Categories ==
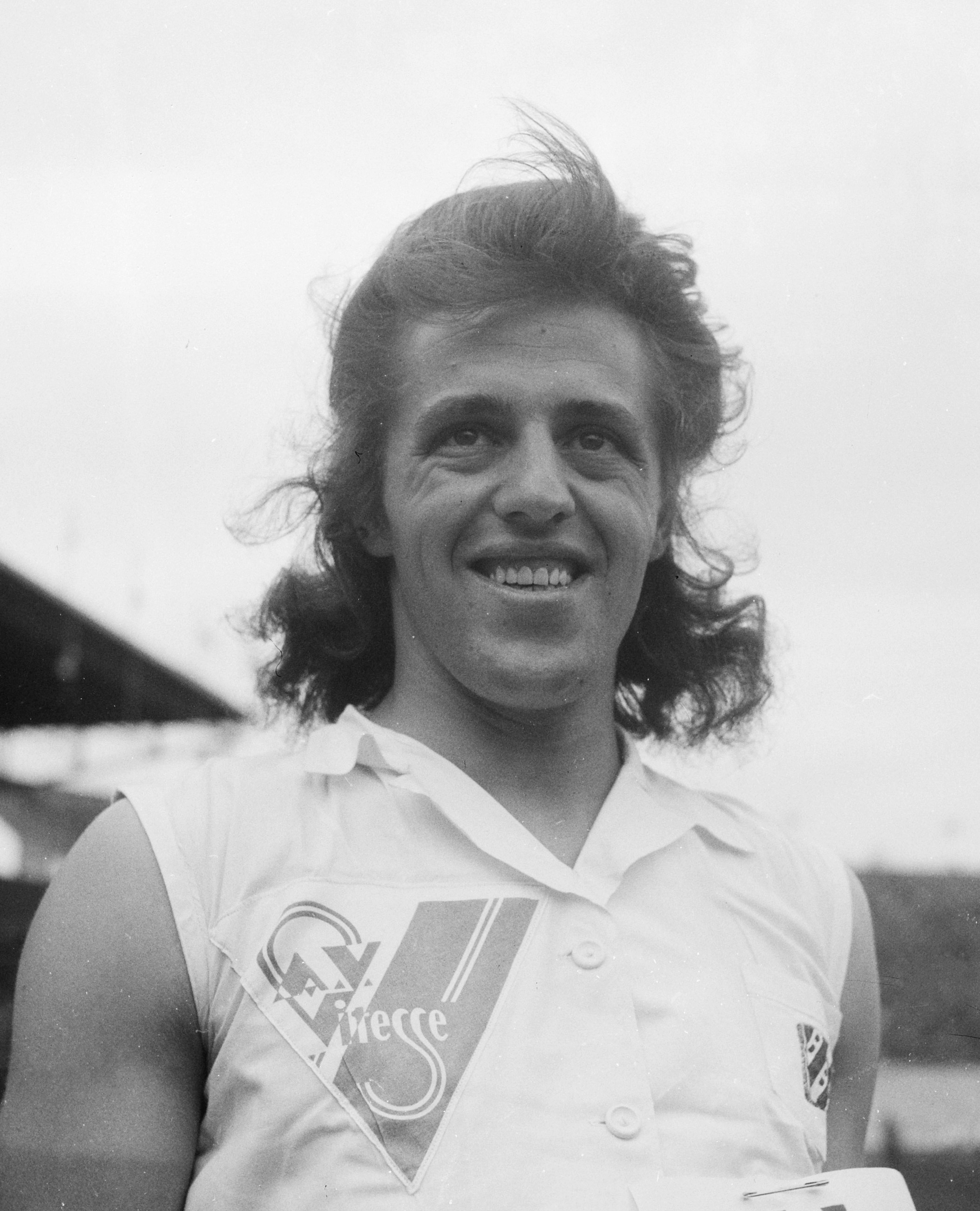
Foekje Dillema was banned from the women's division in 1950.

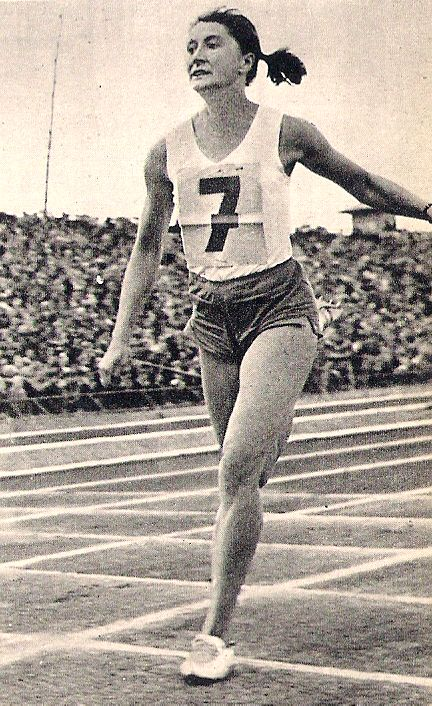
Celina Jesionowska in 1954.

The significant variation in people's abilities in the sport of athletics has led to the creation of numerous competitive categories, in order that athletes are pitted against rivals of a similar kind or ability, and to include groups of people who would otherwise not be competitive in open-to-all events. The eligibility of athletes for a given category is occasionally a source of controversy among the sport's participants, officials and spectators, with disputes typically being rooted in deliberate cheating in order to gain a competitive advantage or differing cultural perspectives over the eligibility of a category.

Beyond the primary categories based on physical attributes, some competitions have further eligibility criteria based on nationality, community membership or occupation.

=== Men's and women's divisions ===
The foremost division of this kind is by sex: in athletics, men and women almost exclusively compete against people of the same sex. In contrast to the men's division, the development of the women's division has caused regular dispute in terms of eligibility. Several intersex athletes had success in the women's division in the early 20th century, such as Stanisława Walasiewicz and Mary Weston (later Mark), and the IAAF responded by introducing sex verification for all athletes in the women's category, beginning with the disqualification of sprinter Foekje Dillema in 1950 after she refused to be tested. Olympic champion Ewa Kłobukowska became the first athlete to publicly fail the test in 1967 and the humiliation she suffered as a result of the announcement led to sex tests becoming a confidential process. Hurdler Maria José Martínez-Patiño failed a test and was disqualified in 1985, but publicly fought the ban in court and was reinstated in 1988. In 1991, the IAAF replaced the sex chromatin test with general medical tests for athletes of all divisions, due to changes in ethical and scientific viewpoints.

The question of eligibility for the women's division continued to be a contentious and public issue into the 21st century, with Caster Semenya and Dutee Chand bearing periods of ineligibility and taking the IAAF to the Court of Arbitration for Sport over their bans under the hyperandrogenism rules. An increasing number of trans men and trans women began to compete in the women's division in the 2010s, which caused other athletes in the division to raise questions of fairness in competition.

The dispute reached new heights in 2019 with the United Nations Human Rights Council issuing a statement that the IAAF was breaching "international human rights norms and standards" through its practice of allowing some athletes to compete in the women's division only once they had lowered their testosterone levels through medical intervention. The IAAF and several prominent women athletes, such as Paula Radcliffe, said this was required in order to prevent a situation where countries deliberately sought out athletes who were intersex, transgender or had a difference in sex development in order to succeed in women's sport. Others have argued for the abolition of gender verification testing, with academic Maren Behrensen citing the harm to tested athletes' social and emotional well-being, the inaccuracy of the medical tests, the difficulty of determining the exact performance advantage provided by a given condition, and the moral risk of "gender-engineering" by setting a biological definition for a female athlete.

=== Age ===
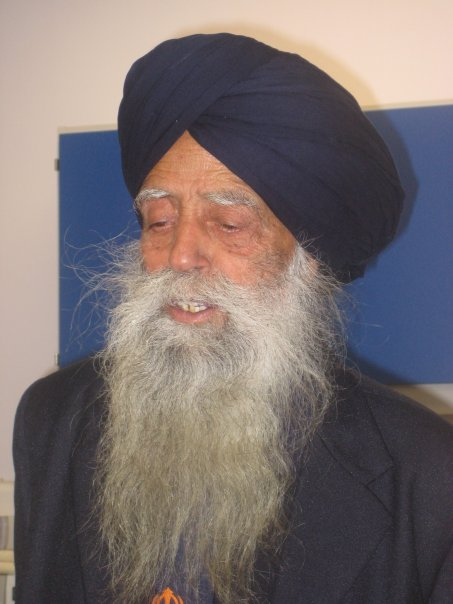
Masters marathon runner Fauja Singh

Age is a significant determiner of ability to compete in athletics, with athletic ability generally increasing through childhood and adolescence, peaking in early adulthood, then gradually declining from around the age of 30 onwards. As a result, numerous age categories have been created to encourage younger and older athletes to engage in competition. At international level, there are three major categories for young athletes: under-23, under-20 (formerly junior), and under-18 (formerly youth). Beyond international rules, different youth categories are in use in the sport, often in the form of two-year or single age groupings. Age categories are more extensive for older athletes and these are commonly organised under the umbrella of masters athletics, which has age groups spanning five years for all athletes aged 35 and above. There is no limit to the number of age groupings, hence Stanisław Kowalski holds a world record for men aged 105 years and over. For competitions where age is not taken into account, this is known as senior or open class athletics; in international rules there remain some restrictions on younger people competing in endurance events for health reasons .

Athletes' eligibility for a competitive age grouping is typically assessed through official documentation, such as birth records or passports. Instances of age cheating have occurred at all of the IAAF's global age category championships. One prominent incident was Olympic medalist Thomas Longosiwa, who provided a falsified passport to compete at the 2006 World Junior Championships in Athletics at age 24. Age falsification for youth categories is mostly limited to less developed parts of the world, such as Africa and South Asia, which have less stringent controls on official documentation and many mature athletes engaging in high school competition due to disruptions to education. The same regions of the world also present issues with age verification in masters age categories, with examples such as Indian distance runners Dharampal Singh Gudha and Fauja Singh (both claiming to be over 100 years old) reaching mainstream attention.

=== Athletes with disabilities ===
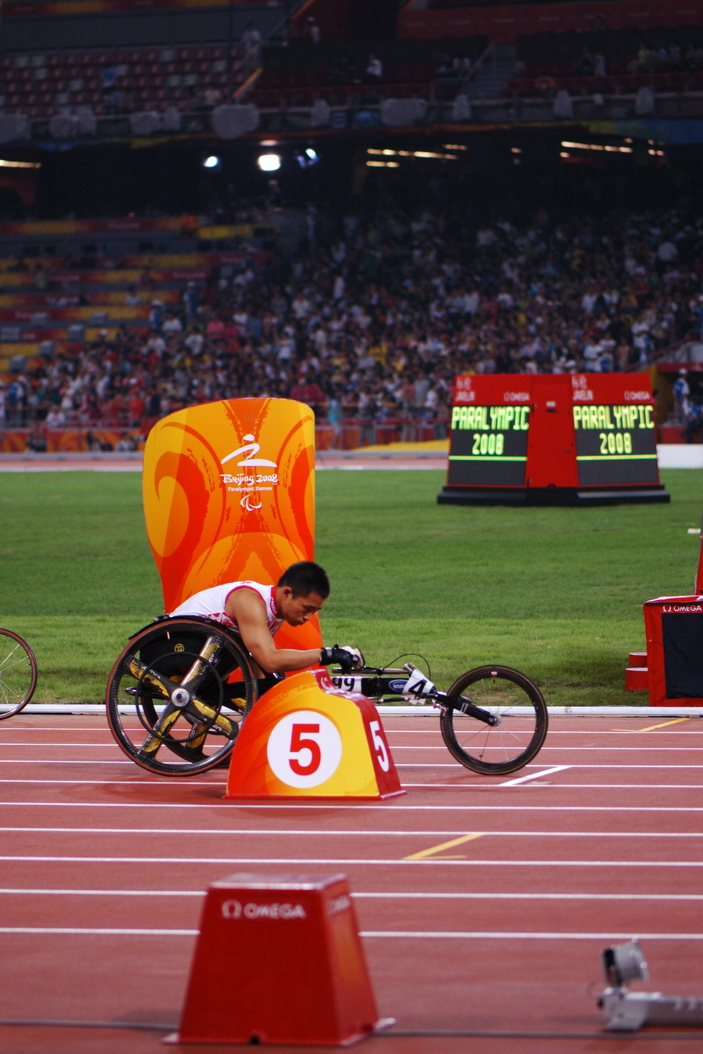
Competitor in a wheelchair race at the 2008 Summer Paralympics

Athletes with physical disabilities have competed at separate international events since 1952. The International Paralympic Committee governs the competitions in athletics, and hosts the Paralympic Games, which have continued since 1960.

Competitors at elite level competitions, are classified by disability, to arrange athletes with a similar disability in the same event. A classified T12 athlete for example, is a track athlete with a visual impairment.

- F = Field athletes
- T = Track athletes
- 11–13 – visual impairment. Compete with a sighted guide.
- 20 – Intellectual disability
- 31–38 – cerebral palsy
- 40–46 – amputation, and others (including athletes with dwarfism)
- 51–58 – Wheelchair

Operating independently of the Paralympic movement, deaf athletes have a long-established tradition of organised athletics, with the first major world competition being included at the 1924 Deaflympics. The primary impediments to the inclusion of deaf athletes in mainstream athletics are sound based elements of the sport, such as the starter's pistol. This can be a disadvantage even in Paralympic sport, as shown in by the example of Olivia Breen who failed to hear a false start in a cerebral palsy class race at the 2012 Paralympics.

In wheelchair racing athletes compete in lightweight racing chairs. Most major marathons have wheelchair divisions and the elite racers consistently beat the runners on foot. The speed of wheel chair racers has caused difficulties for race organisers in properly staggering their start times compared to runners. A collision between Josh Cassidy (a wheelchair racer) and Tiki Gelana (a leading female marathoner) at the 2013 London Marathon brought the issue into the spotlight again.

Occasionally, athletes with a disability reach a level at which they can compete against able-bodied athletes. Legally blind Marla Runyan ran in the 2000 and 2004 Olympics and won a gold medal in the 1500 metres at the 1999 Pan American Games. Oscar Pistorius, a double amputee, was a semi-finalist at the 2011 World Championships and won a silver medal as part of South Africa's 4 × 400 metres relay team. In masters athletics it is far more common to make an accommodation for athletes with a disability. Blind Ivy Granstrom set numerous Masters world records while being guided around the track.

The disability categories have caused dispute among athletes, with some athletes being accused of exaggerating their level of disability in order to compete in less challenging categories. Athletes with intellectual disabilities were banned from competition in all Paralympic sports in response to verification issues and cheating at the 2000 Summer Paralympics and the intellectual disability athletics programme was only restored twelve years later at the 2012 Summer Paralympics.

== Venues ==
Professional athletics almost exclusively takes place in one of three types of venue: stadiums, set courses on grass or woodland, and road-based courses. Such venues ensure that events take place in a relatively standardised manner, as well as improving the safety of athletes and enjoyment for spectators. At a more basic level, many forms of athletics demand very little in terms of venue requirements; almost any open space or area of field can provide a suitable venue for basic running, jumping and throwing competitions.

=== Athletics stadium ===
A typical layout of an outdoor athletics stadium

A standard outdoor track is in the shape of a stadium, 400 metres in length, and has at least eight lanes 1.22 m in width (small arenas might have six lanes). Older track facilities may have nonstandard track lengths, such as 440 yards (402.3 m; 1/4 mile) (common in the United States). Historically, tracks were covered by a dirt running surface. Modern All-weather running tracks are covered by a synthetic weather-resistant running surface, which typically consists of rubber (either black SBR or colored EPDM granules), bound by polyurethane or latex resins. Older tracks may be cinder-covered. The facilities can be called track and field stadiums or athletics stadiums.

A standard indoor track is designed similarly to an outdoor track, but is only 200 metres in length and has between four and eight lanes, each with width between 0.90 m and 1.10 m. Often, the bends of an indoor track will be banked to compensate for the small turning radius. However, because of space limitations, indoor tracks may have other nonstandard lengths, such as 160-yard (146.3 m) indoor track at Madison Square Garden used for the Millrose Games. Because of space limitations, meetings held at indoor facilities do not hold many of athletics events typically contested outdoors.

=== Cross country courses ===
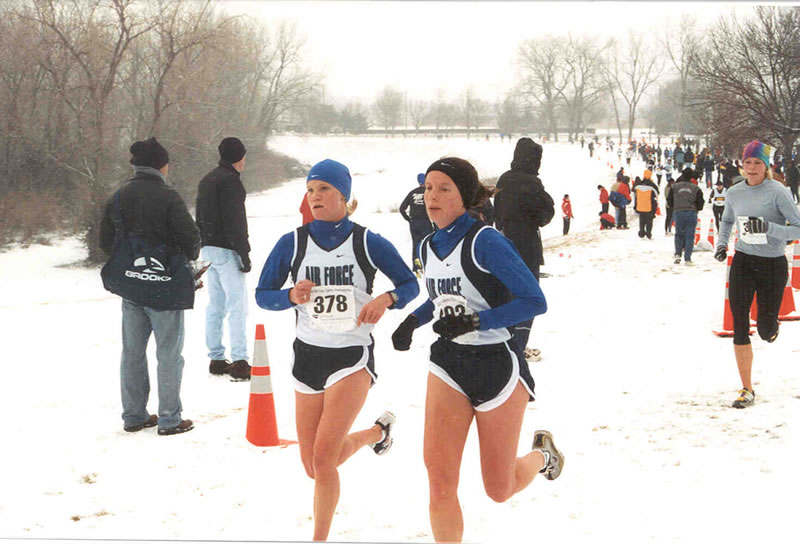
A cross country race taking place at a snowy park in the United States

There is no standardised form of cross country course and each venue is significantly defined by the environment it contains – some may be relatively flat and featureless, while others may be more challenging with natural obstacles, tight turns, and undulating ground. While a small number of purpose-built courses exist, the vast majority of cross country running courses are created by cordoning a specific area within any open natural land, typically a park, woodland or greenspace near a settlement.

At the elite and professional level, courses must be looped and each lap must be between 1750 m and 2000 m in length. Severe obstacles such as deep ditches, high barriers and thick undergrowth not normally present; the course should be able to be completed whilst remaining on foot throughout. In order to maintain the sport's distinction from road running, the usage of unnatural or macadamised surfaces is generally kept to a minimum or avoided entirely.

Because the majority of races take place on areas of grass, soil, mud or earth, weather conditions can significantly affect the difficulty of cross country courses, as snow and rain reduces traction and can create areas of standing water.

=== Road courses ===
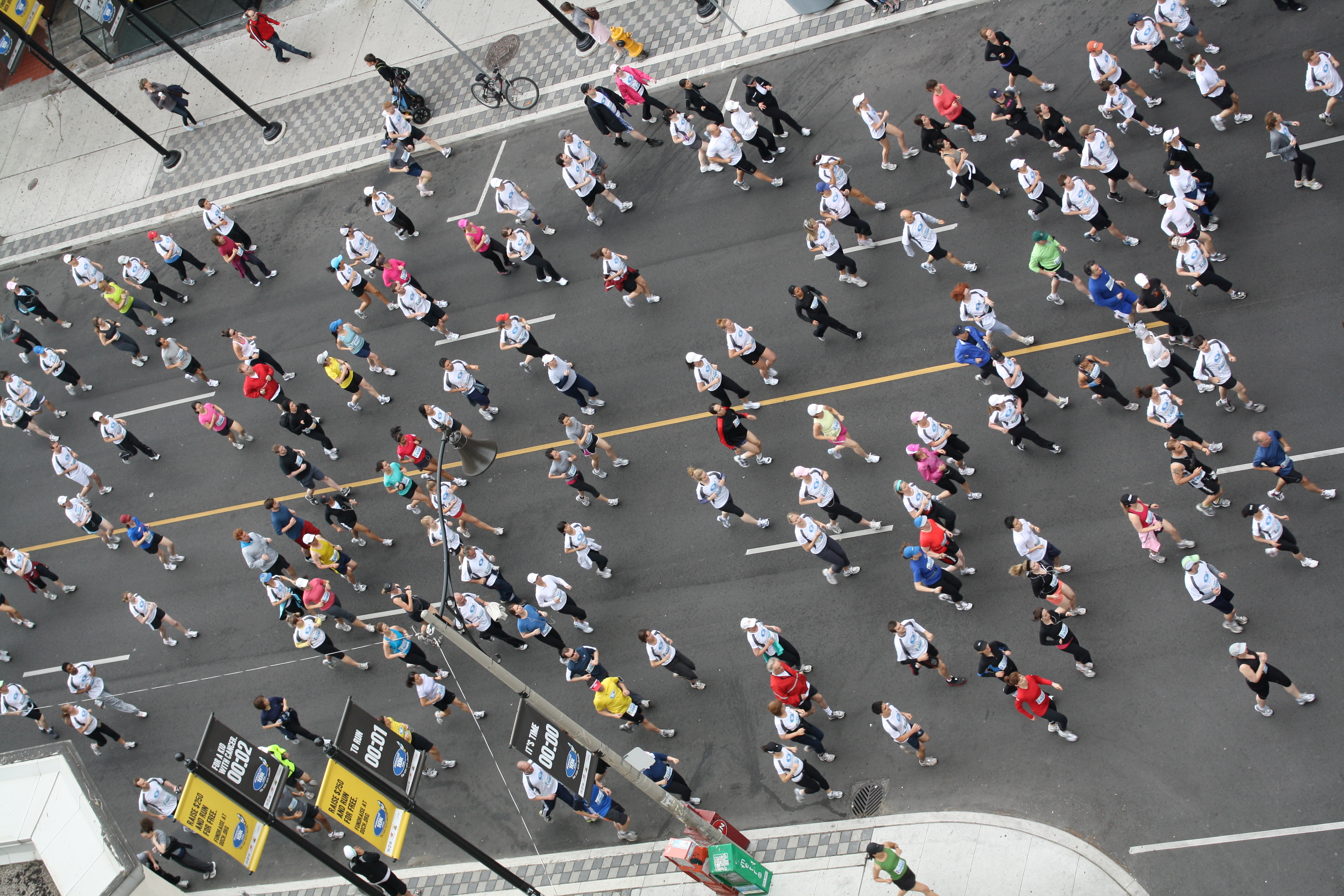
A typical road running course on the inner-city roads of Toronto

The surface of road races is highly important and the IAAF dictate that the courses must be along man-made roads, bicycle paths or footpaths. Courses set along major roads of cities are typical of road running events, and traffic is usually cordoned off from the area during the competition. While soft ground, such as grass, is generally avoided, races may start and finish on soft ground or within an athletics stadium. Road racing courses come in two primary types: looped and point-to-point. Courses may be measured and designed to cover a standardised distance, such as 10 km (6.2 mi), or they may simply follow a set route between two landmarks.

Road running courses over 5 km usually offer drinks or refreshment stations for runners at designated points alongside the course and medical professionals are present at the courses of major races due to the health risks involved with long-distance running.

Elite road walks are conducted on closed loop courses (usually loops of 2,000 or 2,500 meters). Refreshment stations are also present over long distance walking competitions, with drinks being available on every lap for races longer than 10 km.

== Organizations ==
In 1912, the formation of the international governing body for athletics, the International Amateur Athletics Federation, began. In recognition of the movement of the sport from amateurism towards professionalism that began in the late 1970s, the word amateur was dropped from the name, and the organization was rebranded as the International Association of Athletics Federations in 2001. In late 2019, another rebranding began, with World Athletics as the new title of the governing body.

World Athletics has 215 member nations and territories, which are divided into six continental areas (or area associations). The six association areas are for Asia, Africa, Europe, Oceania, North and Central America and Caribbean and South America. The sports within athletics do not have their own independent governing bodies at either international or continental level; instead, all fall under the athletics authorities.

Map of the six continental federations of World Athletics

- AAA – Asian Athletics Association
- CAA – Confederation of African Athletics
- CONSUDATLE – South American Athletics Confederation
- NACACAA – North America, Central America and Caribbean Athletic Association
- EAA – European Athletics Association
- OAA – Oceania Athletics Association

National level athletics organisations are responsible for the regulation of the sport within their respective countries and most major competitions have some form of permit or approval from their national body.

== Competitions ==
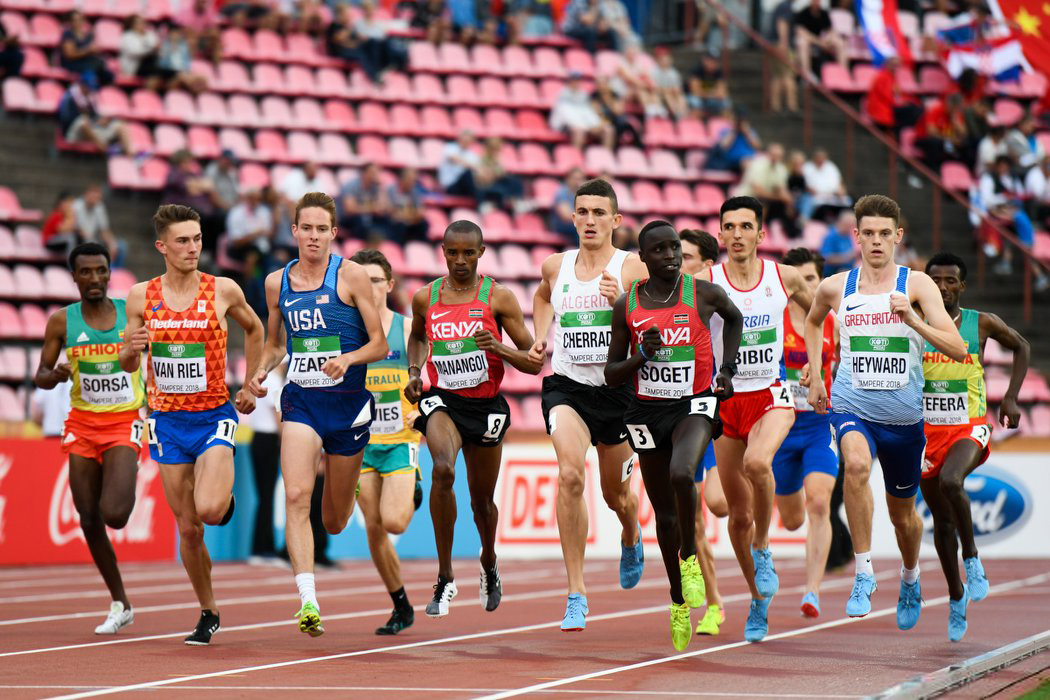
Men's 1,500-metre Running during the 2018 IAAF World U20 Championships at the Ratina Stadium in Tampere, Finland

Athletics competitions can be broadly divided into three types: international championships, national championships, and annual meetings and races. Athletics at international championships, or Games, represent the pinnacle of competition within the sport, and they are contested between athletes representing their country or region. The organisation of these competitions is usually overseen by either a world, continental, or regional athletics governing body. Athletes gain entry into these competitions by earning selection from their national athletics governing body, which is generally done by assessing athletes via their past achievements or performances at a national selection event. National championships are annual competitions endorsed by a national governing body which serve the purpose of deciding the country's best athlete in each event. Annual one-day meetings and races form the most basic level of competition and are the most common format of athletics contests. These events are often invitational and are organised by sports organisations, sports promoters, or other institutions.

Competitions typically feature only one of the sports within athletics. However, major outdoor international athletics championships and athletics competitions held as part of multi-sport events usually feature a combination of track and field, road running and racewalking events

=== International competitions ===
==== Multi-sport events ====
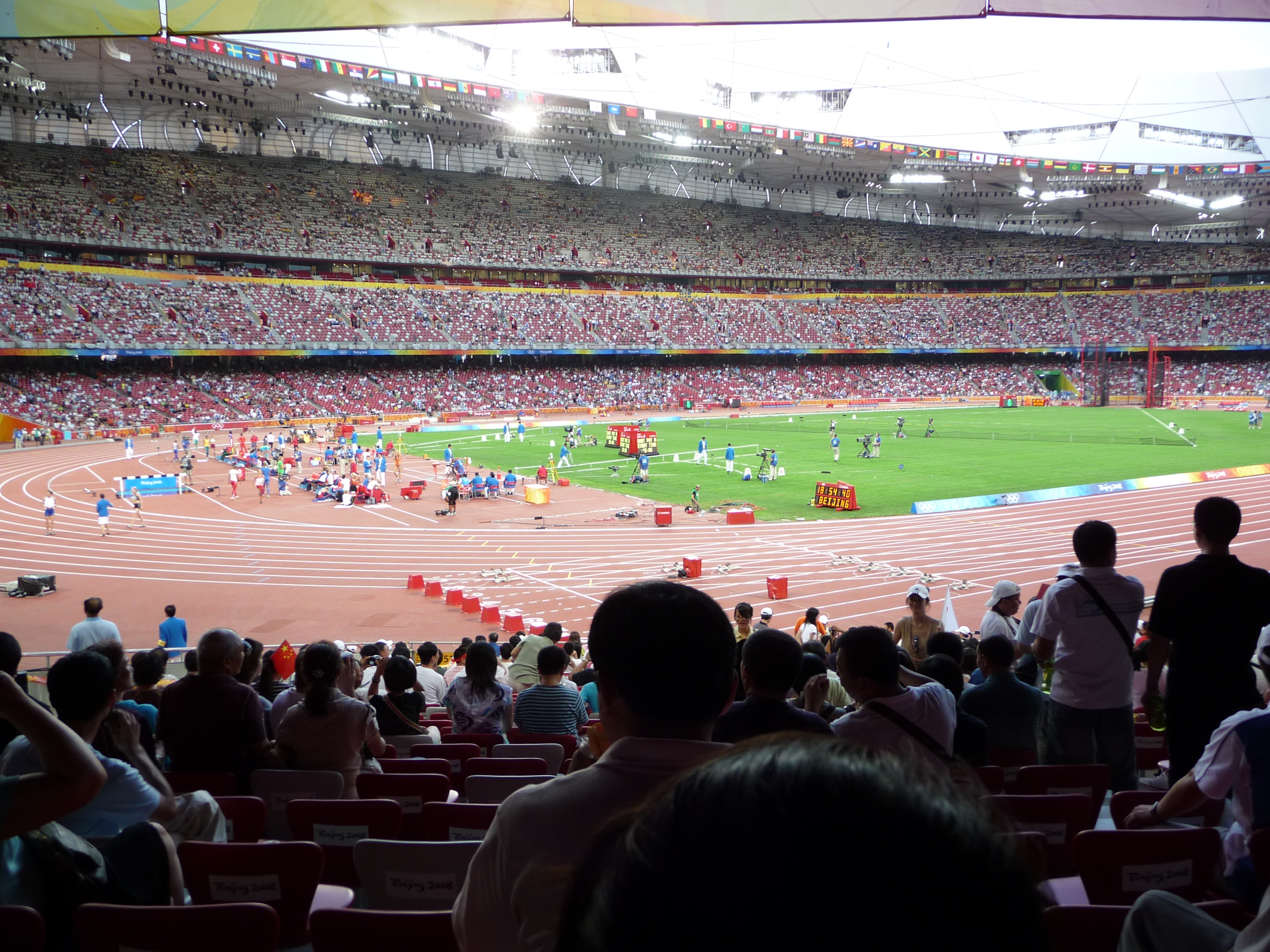
The athletics competition underway at the main stadium of the 2008 Summer Olympics

The modern Summer Olympics was the first event at which a global athletics competition took place. All the four major sports within athletics have featured in the Olympic athletics programme since its inception in 1896, although cross country has since been dropped. The Olympic competition is the most prestigious athletics contest, and many athletics events are among the most watched events at the Summer Olympics. A total of 47 athletics events are held at the Olympics, 24 for men and 23 for women (as of London 2012). The events within the men's and women's programmes are either identical or have a similar equivalent, with the sole exception being that men contest the 50 km race walk.

Following the model of the Olympics, various other multi-sport events arose during the 20th century, which included athletics as a core sport within the programme from the outset. These included the Commonwealth Games, the Central American and Caribbean Games, Universiade, and many others.

The Summer Paralympics include athletes with a physical disability. Track and field, and road events have featured in the Paralympic athletics programme since its inception in 1960. The Paralympic competition is the most prestigious athletics contest where athletes with a physical disability compete. Athletics at the Paralympic Games also include wheelchair racing where athletes compete in lightweight racing chairs. Athletes with a visual impairment compete with a sighted guide. At the 2012 Summer Paralympics in London, for the first time at an international athletics event, the guides received medals, such as the pilots in cycling, and the guides at the Paralympic Winter Games have done for a while.

==== World championships ====
The World Athletics Championships is the primary global athletics championships held by World Athletics. The biennial competition was first held in 1983 and now features an event programme which is identical to the Olympics. Thus, road running, racewalking and track and field are the sports which feature at the competition. Cross country running has its own discrete global championships – the World Athletics Cross Country Championships – which has been held annually since 1973. The World Athletics Indoor Championships is a biennial athletics championships which features solely indoor track and field events. The foremost separate road running event is the annual World Athletics Half Marathon Championships (formerly IAAF World Half Marathon Championships). While not having official world championship status, the biennial World Athletics Race Walking Team Championships fulfils a similar role for the sport of racewalking. Outdoor track and field is the only sport in athletics that does not have a its own distinct global championship which is separate from other types of athletics, although the IAAF Continental Cup (a quadrennial competition between continental teams) is composed entirely of outdoor track and field events.

Other world championships include the World Athletics U20 Championships and the 2017 defunct World Youth Championships in Athletics, which are for athletes under-19 and under-17, respectively. World Masters Athletics conducts the World Masters Athletics Championships for athletes in 5-year age divisions over the age of 35. The now defunct IAAF World Road Relay Championships served as the global event for ekiden marathon relay races.

Elite athletes with a physical disability compete at the World Para Athletics Championships.

==== Area/Continental championships ====
African, Asian, European, North & Central and Caribbean (NACAC), Oceania and South American Athletics Championships are held regularly in a variety of configurations. For example, the Oceania Area Championships in Athletics are combined with the Oceania U20 Athletics Championships. Most of the main regions hold separate cross-country, road-running and marathon championships.

There is the Pan American Combined Events Cup. Central American and Caribbean Championships are organised by the Central American and Caribbean Athletic Confederation (the CACAC)).

== Culture and media ==
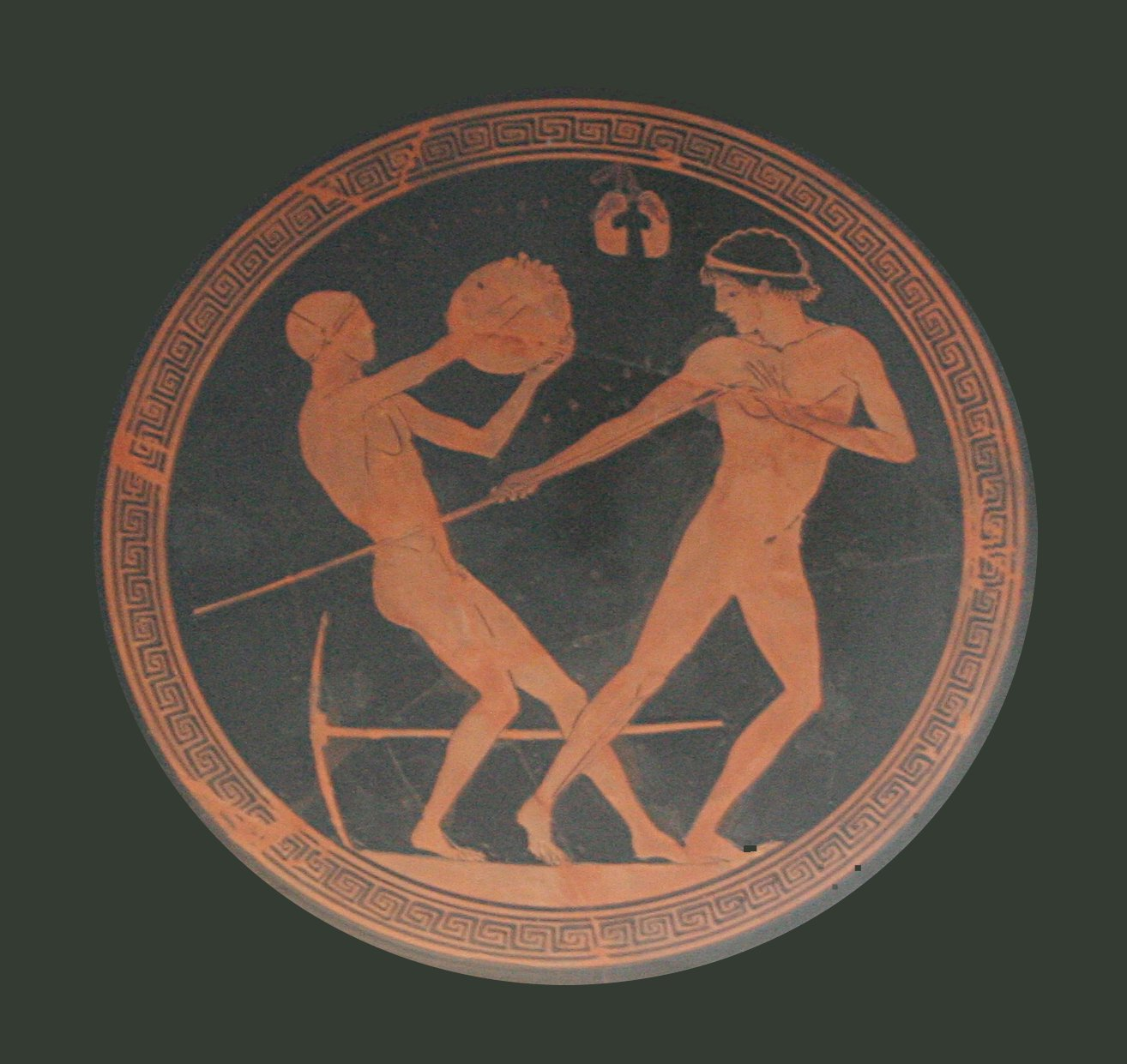
Ancient Greek pottery showing the javelin and the discus throw

Athletics, and its athletes in particular, has been artistically depicted since ancient times – one of the surviving instances include runners and high jumpers in the motifs of Ancient Egyptian tombs dating from 2250 BC. Athletics was much respected in Ancient Greece and the events within the ancient pentathlon provided inspiration for large statues such as the Discobolus and Discophoros, and for motifs on countless vase and pottery works. Aristotle discussed the significance of the pentathlon in his treatise Rhetoric and reflected on the athlete aesthetic of the period: "a body capable of enduring all efforts, either of the racecourse or of bodily strength...This is why the athletes in the pentathlon are most beautiful".

Films about athletics are overwhelmingly focused on running events: the 1962 film The Loneliness of the Long Distance Runner (based on the book of the same name) explores cross country running as a means of escape. Chariots of Fire, perhaps one of the most well-known athletics films, is a fictionalised account of Eric Liddell and Harold Abrahams's chase for sprint gold medals at the 1924 Olympics. Track and field has been the subject of American films such as Personal Best (1981) and Across the Tracks (1991). Biopics are found within the genre, including Prefontaine (regarding Steve Prefontaine) and Jim Thorpe – All-American (1951) featuring Burt Lancaster as Thorpe. Documentaries are also common with examples such as 2007 film Spirit of the Marathon, which follows runners' preparations for the 2005 Chicago Marathon.

Books on the subject are predominantly non-fiction, and tend towards the forms of training manuals and historical accounts of athletics. The story of the four-minute mile has been a particularly popular subject, spawning books such as The Perfect Mile and 3:59.4: The Quest to Break the Four Minute Mile.

Athletics journalism has spawned a number of dedicated periodicals including Athletics Weekly and Race Walking Record, both of which were first published in England in the early 1940s, and Track & Field News which was first published in the United States in 1948. Runner's World has been in print since 1966 and the Track & Field Magazine of Japan (Rikujyo Kyogi Magazine) is another long-running publication.

Athletics events have been selected as a main motif in numerous collectors' coins. One of the recent samples is the €10 Greek Running commemorative coin, minted in 2003 to commemorate the 2004 Summer Olympics. In the obverse of the coin, a modern athlete figure appears in the foreground, shown in the starting position, while in the background two ancient runners are carved in a manner that gives the appearance of a coin that is "worn" by time. This scene originally appeared on a black-figure vase of the 6th century BC.

== See also ==
- List of films about the sport of athletics
- List of Olympic medalists in athletics (men), (women)
- List of world records in athletics
- World records in athletics (athletes with a disability)
- National records in athletics
- Association of Track and Field Statisticians
- Running in Ancient Greece
- USA Outdoor Track and Field Championships
- World Athletics Championships
- Diamond League
