= The Nazi Hunters: How a Team of Spies and Survivors Captured the World's Most Notorious Nazi =

2013 book by Neal Bascomb

- Author: Neal Bascomb
- Language: English
- Genre: Non-fiction
- Publication date: August 27, 2013

The Nazi Hunters: How a Team of Spies and Survivors Captured the World's Most Notorious Nazi is a non-fiction book by Neal Bascomb. Taking place in Argentina (and later Israel) in the years 1960 and 1961, the book follows the efforts by Mossad and Shin Bet, both agencies of the Israeli Intelligence Community, to capture Adolf Eichmann, a high ranking Nazi who played a major role in the Holocaust. The book was published in August 2013. It won the YALSA Award for Excellence in Nonfiction in 2014.
