= Red Mutiny: Eleven Fateful Days on the Battleship Potemkin =

Red Mutiny
- Softcover edition
- Author: Neal Bascomb
- Language: English
- Publisher: Houghton Mifflin Harcourt
- Publication date: May 17, 2007
- Publication place: United States
- Media type: Print, e-book
- Pages: 400 pp.
- ISBN: 978-0618592067
- Preceded by: The Perfect Mile
- Followed by: Hunting Eichmann

Red Mutiny: Eleven Fateful Days on the Battleship Potemkin is a 2007 book by American writer Neal Bascomb. It was released on May 17, 2007 by Houghton Mifflin Harcourt. The book focuses on the events of the Battleship Potemkin uprising.

== Awards ==
The book won the United States Maritime Literature Award in 2007.

== Reception ==
A reviewer of Kirkus Reviews commented "Bascomb... presents the gripping events of June 1905 with sharply focused immediacy and a flair for high drama. The mutiny aboard the Potemkin, which threatened the entire Black Sea Fleet, was eventually suppressed, but it helped sow the seeds of the Russian Revolution. In Bascomb’s capable hands, this powerful morality play vividly reminds us never to underestimate a handful of people willing to die for an idea... History at its best: readable, dramatic and propelled by unforgettable principals."
