= Wes Santee =

American middle-distance runner

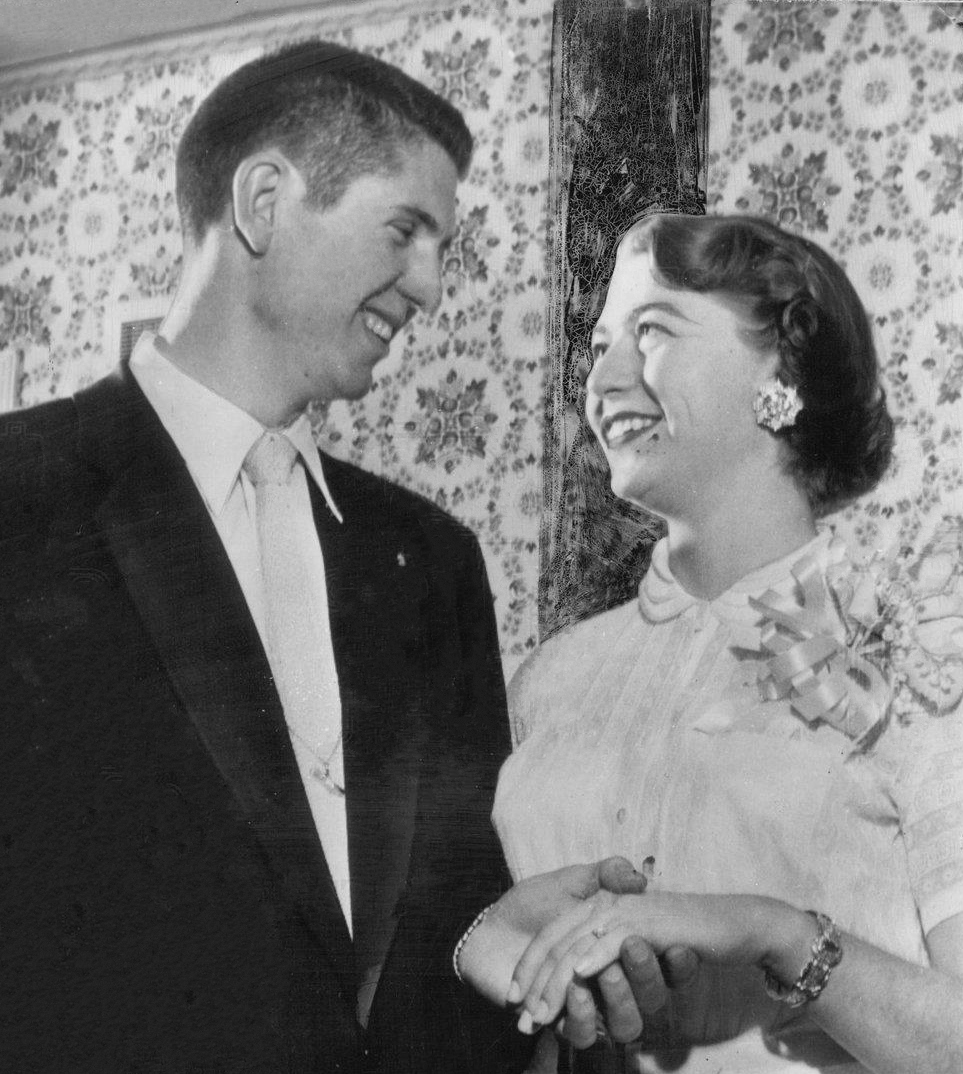
- Wedding of Wes Santee and Anna Lou Denning on April 19, 1954

Personal information
- Born: March 25, 1932 Ashland, Kansas, U.S.
- Died: November 14, 2010 (aged 78) Eureka, Kansas, U.S.
- Height: 185 cm (6 ft 1 in)
- Weight: 68 kg (150 lb)

Sport
- Sport: Athletics
- Event: 800–5000 m
- Club: Kansas Jayhawks, Lawrence

Achievements and titles
- Personal bests: 800 m – 1:47.8 (1955); 1500 m – 3:42.8 (1954); Mile – 4:00.5 (1955); 5000 m – 14:32.0 (1952)
Medal record
Representing the United States
Pan American Games
Silver medal – second place	1955 Mexico City	1500 m

David Wesley Santee (March 25, 1932 – November 14, 2010) was an American middle distance runner and athlete who competed mainly in the 1,500 meters and mile events.

Born in Ashland, Kansas, Santee was nicknamed the "Ashland Antelope." Santee attended high school in Ashland, where he set a state record in the mile run. He later attended the University of Kansas where he set records in cross country and the mile and two-mile events. He was the Individual NCAA Cross Country Champion in 1953, while leading his team to the overall championship.

Santee competed in the 5,000 meters in the 1952 Summer Olympics at Helsinki, Finland, but did not win a medal. Three years later, Santee won the silver medal in the 1,500 meters at the 1955 Pan American Games in Mexico City.

During this period, Santee was one of the top milers in the world, aspiring to become the first man to run a four-minute mile. His chief competitors were Great Britain's Roger Bannister and Australia's John Landy. On May 6, 1954, Bannister became the first to break the barrier with a time of 3:59.4. Seven weeks later, Landy surpassed Bannister's mark.

In June 1954, Santee set the a world 1,500-meter record of 3:42.8 on his way to a mile win over Olympic champion Josy Barthel, but after sprinting past Barthel he slowed slightly, finishing the mile at 4:00.7.

In early 1955, Santee came close to a four-minute mile of his own, with a time of 4:00.5, but he would never surpass this time. Shortly afterwards, Santee was suspended by the Amateur Athletic Union (AAU) in a dispute over his amateur status. AAU rules at that time limited amateurs to $15 per diem expenses to cover food and lodging, and the costs of air travel. For three track meets over a nine-day period in May 1955, Santee had been paid $1,127.85 of expenses

In 1956, Santee was permanently barred from amateur events, ending his chance to surpass Bannister and Landy and also costing him a place in the 1956 Summer Olympics at Melbourne, Australia. Santee had previously been banned from competing internationally because of early questions surrounding his status as an amateur.

During his abbreviated career, Santee set world records in the 1,500 meter run, indoor 1,500 meter run and indoor mile. In 2005 he was inducted into the National Track and Field Hall of Fame. Santee's track career, including his rivalry with Bannister and Landy and his troubles with the AAU, is chronicled in Neal Bascomb's 2004 book The Perfect Mile.

He died of cancer at home in Eureka, Kansas on November 14, 2010.
