= Higher: A Historic Race to the Sky and the Making of a City =

2003 book by Neal Bascomb

- Softcover edition
- Author: Neal Bascomb
- Language: English
- Subject: Skyscrapers, architecture
- Genre: Non-fiction
- Publisher: Doubleday
- Publication date: October 21, 2003
- Publication place: United States
- Media type: Print, e-book
- Pages: 352 pp.
- ISBN: 978-0385506601
- OCLC: 51984970
- Followed by: The Perfect Mile

Higher: A Historic Race to the Sky and the Making of a City is the debut non-fiction book by American journalist Neal Bascomb. The book was initially published by Doubleday on 21 October 2003. The book focuses on the race among the Chrysler Building, Empire State Building, and 40 Wall Street to win the title of the world's tallest building and on architects William Van Alen and H. Craig Severance involved in the projects.
