= Michael Bay filmography =

List of films directed and produced by Michael Bay

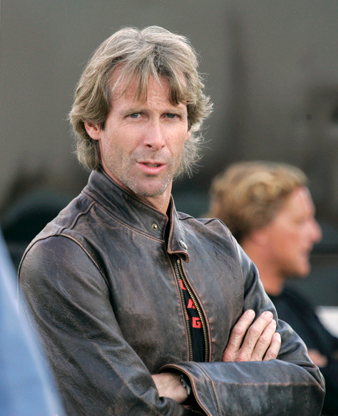
Bay on the set of his film Transformers in 2006

Michael Bay, an American director and producer, started his career directing music videos and commercials. This included a commercial for the American Red Cross in 1992 which received a Clio Award, and music videos for Donny Osmond, Styx and Meat Loaf. Jerry Bruckheimer recognizing his achievements on commercials offered the chance to direct one of his productions as Bay's feature film debut. Bay did so with Bruckheimer's action comedy Bad Boys starring Will Smith, and Martin Lawrence. In the same year he also received a Directors Guild of America Award for his work on commercials. Bay followed this with action film The Rock starring Sean Connery, and Nicolas Cage. The film was a commercial success grossing over $335 million at the worldwide box office. In 1998, he directed, and produced the science fiction disaster film Armageddon which was the highest-grossing film of the year, and Bay received the Saturn Award for Best Director. After the success of Armageddon he also became the youngest director to gross $1 billion at the worldwide box office.

Three years later he directed and produced the war film Pearl Harbor (2001) which was negatively received by critics but grossed over $449 million at the box office. Later in the same year, Bay founded his own production company Platinum Dunes with Brad Fuller, and Andrew Form. In 2003, Bay directed the action comedy sequel Bad Boys II which saw Smith and Lawrence reprise their roles. Two years later he directed science fiction action film The Island (2005), and produced the horror remake The Amityville Horror (2005).

In 2007, Bay directed, and produced the first film in the live-action Transformers film series based on the toy line of the same name. It was a commercial success grossing over $709 million at the box office. He followed this by directing its sequel Transformers: Revenge of the Fallen (2009). The film drew negative reception from critics but grossed over $836 million at the box office. The third installment in the series Transformers: Dark of the Moon (2011) became the first of his films to gross over $1 billion at the box office. Two years later Bay directed and produced crime comedy Pain & Gain (2013). From 2014 to 2017, he executive produced the television series Black Sails for Starz. In 2014, he directed, and produced a fourth Transformer film, Transformers: Age of Extinction, which grossed over $1 billion at the box office, and was the highest-grossing film at the worldwide box office that year. Three years later, he directed the fifth entry in the Transformers film series, Transformers: The Last Knight which received generally negative reviews from critics and was the lowest-grossing live-action film worldwide in the franchise's history until Transformers: Rise of the Beasts.

== Film ==
Key
†	Denotes films that have not yet been released

Director

Year	Title	Credited as		Ref(s)
Year	Title	Director	Producer	Ref(s)
1995	Bad Boys	Yes	No	
1996	The Rock	Yes	No	
1998	Armageddon	Yes	Yes	
2001	Pearl Harbor	Yes	Yes	
2003	Bad Boys II	Yes	No	
2005	The Island	Yes	Yes	
2007	Transformers	Yes	Executive	
2009	Transformers: Revenge of the Fallen	Yes	Executive	
2011	Transformers: Dark of the Moon	Yes	Executive	
2013	Pain & Gain	Yes	Yes	
2014	Transformers: Age of Extinction	Yes	Executive	
2016	13 Hours: The Secret Soldiers of Benghazi	Yes	Yes	
2017	Transformers: The Last Knight	Yes	Executive	
2019	6 Underground	Yes	Yes	
2022	Ambulance	Yes	Yes	
2025	We Are Storror	Yes	Yes	

Producer

Year	Title	Director	Ref(s)
2003	The Texas Chainsaw Massacre	Marcus Nispel	
2005	The Amityville Horror	Andrew Douglas	
2006	The Texas Chainsaw Massacre: The Beginning	Jonathan Liebesman	
2007	The Hitcher	Dave Meyers	
2009	The Unborn	David S. Goyer	
2009	Friday the 13th	Marcus Nispel	
2009	Horsemen	Jonas Åkerlund	
2010	A Nightmare on Elm Street	Samuel Bayer	
2011	I Am Number Four	D. J. Caruso	
2013	The Purge	James DeMonaco	
2014	The Purge: Anarchy	James DeMonaco	
2014	Teenage Mutant Ninja Turtles	Jonathan Liebesman	
2014	Ouija	Stiles White	
2015	Project Almanac	Dean Israelite	
2016	Teenage Mutant Ninja Turtles: Out of the Shadows	Dave Green	
2016	The Purge: Election Year	James DeMonaco	
2016	Ouija: Origin of Evil	Mike Flanagan	
2018	A Quiet Place	John Krasinski	
2018	The First Purge	Gerard McMurray	
2018	Bumblebee	Travis Knight	
2020	Songbird	Adam Mason	
2021	A Quiet Place Part II	John Krasinski	
2021	The Forever Purge	Everardo Gout	
2023	Transformers: Rise of the Beasts	Steven Caple Jr.	
2024	A Quiet Place: Day One	Michael Sarnoski	
2024	Transformers One	Josh Cooley	
2024	Apartment 7A	Natalie Erika James	
2025	Drop	Christopher Landon	
2027	A Quiet Place Part III †	John Krasinski	
TBA	Sponsor †	James Ponsoldt	

Actor

Year	Title	Role	Ref(s)
1998	Armageddon	NASA extra	
1999	Mystery Men	Frat Boy	
2000	Coyote Ugly	Photographer	
2001	Double Down	Extra	
2003	Bad Boys II	Crappy Car Driver	
2007	Transformers	Human flicked by Megatron	
2014	Transformers: Age of Extinction	Semi-truck passenger	
2020	Bad Boys for Life	Wedding MC	
2024	Bad Boys: Ride or Die	Porsche Driver	

Other

Year	Title	Role	Ref(s)
2020	Songbird	Director of action sequences	

== Television ==
Executive producer

Year	Title	Network	Notes	Ref(s)
2014–2017	Black Sails	Starz		
2014–2018	The Last Ship	TNT		
2016	Billion Dollar Wreck	History		
2018–2023	Jack Ryan	Amazon Video		
2018–2019	The Purge	USA Network		
2024	Born Evil: The Serial Killer and the Savior	Investigation Discovery	Also directed all 5 episodes	

Actor

Year	Title	Role	Network	Notes	Ref(s)
1986	Miami Vice	Goon #3	NBC	Episode "Free Verse"	
1986	Vengeance: The Story of Tony Cimo	SLED agent	CBS	Television film	
2013	The Neighbors	Himself	ABC	Episode "Mother Clubbers"	
2022	Victoria's Secret: Angels and Demons	Himself	Hulu	Episode "Part Two: The Secret Friend"; Documentary series	

== Music videos ==
Year	Title	Artist	Ref(s)
1989	"Angelia"	Richard Marx	
1989	"Call It Love"	Poco	
1989	"I'll Be Holding On"	Gregg Allman	
1989	"Nothin' to Hide"	Poco	
1989	"Sacred Emotion"	Donny Osmond	
1989	"Whatcha Gonna Do"	Tyler Collins	
1990	"Bird on a Wire"	The Neville Brothers	
1990	"Dream On"	Britny Fox	
1990	"Heartbeat"	Seduction	
1990	"Hearts in Trouble"	Chicago	
1990	"House of Pain"	Faster Pussycat	
1990	"Keep on Lovin' Me Baby"	Colin James	
1990	"Love Is the Ritual"	Styx	
1990	"My Love Is a Fire"	Donny Osmond	
1990	"Second Chance"	Tyler Collins	
1990	"Show Me the Way"	Styx	
1990	"Sittin' in the Lap of Luxury"	Louie Louie	
1990	"Up All Night"	Slaughter	
1991	"Call It Rock N' Roll"	Great White	
1991	"Can't Get Enuff"	Winger	
1991	"Chasin' the Wind"	Chicago	
1991	"Congo Square"	Great White	
1991	"I Love You"	Vanilla Ice	
1991	"I Touch Myself"	Divinyls	
1991	"Nutbush City Limits (The 90s Version)"	Tina Turner	
1991	"Remember My Name"	House of Lords	
1991	"Sure Lookin'"	Donny Osmond	
1991	"That's the Way Love Goes"	Young MC	
1992	"Do It to Me"	Lionel Richie	
1992	"Love Thing"	Tina Turner	
1992	"You Won't See Me Cry"	Wilson Phillips	
1993	"I'd Do Anything for Love (But I Won't Do That)"	Meat Loaf	
1994	"Objects in the Rear View Mirror May Appear Closer Than They Are"	Meat Loaf	
1994	"Rock and Roll Dreams Come Through"	Meat Loaf	
1995	"Shy Guy"	Diana King	
1997	"Falling in Love (Is Hard on the Knees)"	Aerosmith	
2001	"There You'll Be"	Faith Hill	

== Theme park attractions ==
Year	Title	Role	Ref(s)
2011	Transformers: The Ride – 3D	Creative consultant	

== See also ==
- Michael Bay's unrealized projects
