= Hunting Eichmann =

Book by Neal Bascomb

- Author: Neal Bascomb
- Language: English
- Subject: History, adventure
- Genre: Non-fiction
- Publisher: Houghton Mifflin
- Publication date: 4/01/2009
- Publication place: United States
- Media type: Print, e-book
- Pages: 390
- ISBN: 0618858679
- LC Class: DD247.E5 B37 2009
- Preceded by: Red Mutiny
- Followed by: The New Cool

Hunting Eichmann: How a Band of Survivors and a Young Spy Agency Chased Down the World's Most Notorious Nazi is a book by Neal Bascomb. It chronicles the efforts to capture Adolf Eichmann, a top official in the SS during World War II and one of the major organizers of the Holocaust, in the years following the war.

A network of concentration camp survivors and Nazi hunters in Europe, including Simon Wiesenthal, pursued leads on Eichmann's whereabouts and passed information to the government of Israel and its foreign intelligence agency, Mossad. A team of agents from both Mossad and Shin Bet (Israeli internal security) traveled to Buenos Aires, Argentina, where Eichmann was hiding, and captured him in May 1960. He was taken to Israel, tried and convicted of war crimes in 1961, and executed by hanging in June 1962.

The recorded book version is narrated by actor Paul Hecht.

== Reception ==
A review in Library Journal commended the author's "singing prose style", as well as "The details elicited from Bascomb's interviews with a startling range of people associated with the events [that] freshen interest in this famous story".
