= Neal Bascomb =

American journalist and author

- Born: 1 April 1971 (age 55); Denver, Colorado
- Education: Miami University (B.A.)
- Occupation: Writer
- Writing career
- Genres: Non-fiction, Popular history, Popular science
- Subjects: Narrative, History, Science, Military
- Website: nealbascomb.com

Neal Bascomb (born 1971) is an American journalist and author. He is known for his books on popular history.

== Early life and education ==
He graduated Phi Beta Kappa from Miami University with a B.A. in Economics and English Literature.

== Career ==
After graduation, he worked as a journalist in London, Paris, and Dublin. He was an editor for St. Martin's Press, and in 2000, he began writing books full-time. His books have ranked on a number of bestseller lists, been optioned for film, and been published in over 15 countries. He has contributed to the New York Times, Wall Street Journal, and the Los Angeles Times.

== Personal life ==
He currently lives in Philadelphia, Pennsylvania.

== Books ==
Title	Year Published	ISBN	Summary	Notes
Higher: A Historic Race to the Sky and the Making of a City	2003	ISBN 0385506600	The race between the Chrysler Building, Empire State Building, and 40 Wall Street, to claim the title of the world's tallest building during the Roaring Twenties	Barnes & Noble Discover Great New Writer Pick
The Perfect Mile: Three Athletes, One Goal, and Less Than Four Minutes to Achieve It	2005	ISBN 0618391126	The story of Roger Bannister, Wes Santee, and John Landy battling to be the first runner to break the four-minute mile	New York Times Bestseller
Red Mutiny: Eleven Fateful Days on the Battleship Potemkin	2007	ISBN 9780618592067	Details the events of the Battleship Potemkin uprising	United States Maritime Literature Award
Hunting Eichmann: How a Band of Survivors and a Young Spy Agency Chased Down the World's Most Notorious Nazi	2009	ISBN 9780618858675	Depicts the search for and capture of Adolf Eichmann	National Bestseller
The New Cool: A Visionary Teacher, His FIRST Robotics Team, and the Ultimate Battle of Smarts	2011	ISBN 9780307588890	Bascomb follows the FIRST robotics team from Dos Pueblos High School and details their experience; see D'Penguineers	Optioned by film producer Scott Rudin
The Nazi Hunters: How a Team of Spies and Survivors Captured the World's Most Notorious Nazi	2013	ISBN 9780545430999	Depicts the search for and capture of Adolf Eichmann	For readers age 12-18
One More Step: My Story of Living with Cerebral Palsy, Climbing Kilimanjaro, and Surviving the Hardest Race on Earth	2015	ISBN 9780062295583	Written with Bonner Paddock, it chronicles Paddock's effort to climb Mount Kilimanjaro	New York Times Bestseller
The Winter Fortress: The Epic Mission to Sabotage Hitler's Atomic Bomb	2016	ISBN 9780544368057	How a brilliant scientist and a band of young patriots destroyed Vemork, the plant that provided heavy water, an essential resource for the German atomic research program.	New York Times Bestseller / Optioned by Michael Bay, Paramount Pictures
The Escape Artists: A Band of Daredevil Pilots and the Greatest Prison Break of the Great War	2018	ISBN 0544937112	National Bestseller / Optioned by director Lenny Abrahamson	
Faster: How a Jewish Driver, an American Heiress, and a Legendary Car Beat Hitler’s Best	2020	ISBN 9781328489876	Amazon History Book of the Month / Optioned by Imperative Entertainment	
