= The Winter Fortress =

2016 military history book

The Winter Fortress: The Epic Mission to Sabotage Hitler’s Atomic Bomb
- Author: Neal Bascomb
- Language: English
- Genre: Non-fiction
- Publisher: Houghton Mifflin Harcourt
- Publication date: May 3, 2016
- Publication place: United States
- Pages: 384
- ISBN: 978-0-544-36805-7

The Winter Fortress: The Epic Mission to Sabotage Hitler’s Atomic Bomb is a 2016 military history book by Neal Bascomb. It tells the story of the Norwegian operation to sabotage the Vemork heavy water plant during World War II.
