= The Perfect Mile =

Non-fiction work by Neal Bascomb

- Cover of paperback, depicting Roger Bannister breaking the 4 minute mile record
- Author: Neal Bascomb
- Language: English
- Genre: Non-fiction
- Publisher: Mariner Books
- Publication date: 2004
- Publication place: United States
- Pages: 344
- ISBN: 0-618-56209-5
- OCLC: 54001404
- Preceded by: Higher: A Historic Race to the Sky and the Making of a City
- Followed by: Red Mutiny: Eleven Fateful Days on the Battleship Potemkin

The Perfect Mile: Three Athletes, One Goal, and Less Than Four Minutes to Achieve It (2004) by Neal Bascomb is a non-fiction book about three runners and their attempts to become the first man to run a mile under four minutes and their first subsequent head-to-head competition. The runners are Englishman Roger Bannister, American Wes Santee, and Australian John Landy.

June 21, 1954: Less than six weeks after Bannister’s historic feat, Australian John Landy runs 3:58 at a track meet in Finland, throwing down the gauntlet.

August 7, 1954: The Empire Games in Vancouver, Canada, pits the two titans against one another in an event billed the “Miracle Mile.”

The Perfect Mile (also called the Miracle Mile) is not against the clock, rather it is what was required in heated competition between John Landy and Roger Bannister.

The book was also adapted as a 2005 TV movie called, "4 Minutes".

== Reception ==
The New York Times' review calls it an "enthralling book" and says Bascomb "expertly winds up the tension of the three men's many failed attempts to get closer to the magic mark, before Bannister wrote himself into legend first on a windy day at the Oxford University track".
