= John Krasinski filmography =

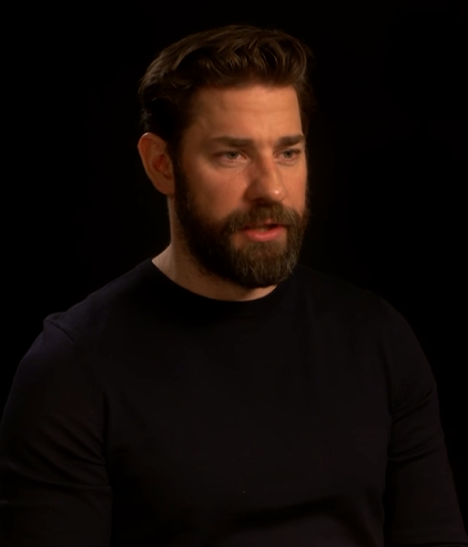
Krasinski in 2018

John Krasinski is an American actor and filmmaker. He is best known for his role as Jim Halpert on the sitcom The Office (2005–2013), on which he also served as a producer and occasional director. In 2013, he received an Emmy Award nomination as a producer of the series. He later directed and starred in the comedy-drama film Brief Interviews with Hideous Men (2009) and the comedy-drama film The Hollars (2016). He co-produced the Amazon spy thriller series Jack Ryan (2018–2026) and portrayed its title character, for which he received a Screen Actors Guild Award for Outstanding Performance by a Male Actor in a Drama Series nomination.

Krasinski directed, co-wrote, and co-starred in the critically and commercially successful horror film A Quiet Place (2018), for which he was nominated for the Writers Guild of America Award for Best Original Screenplay. He also directed, co-produced, and wrote the sequel, A Quiet Place Part II (2020). His other film appearances include License to Wed (2007), Leatherheads (2008), Away We Go (2009), It's Complicated (2009), Something Borrowed (2011), Big Miracle (2012), Promised Land (2012), Aloha (2015), the military action thriller 13 Hours: The Secret Soldiers of Benghazi (2016), and the Marvel Cinematic Universe film Doctor Strange in the Multiverse of Madness (2022). He has also performed voice-over work for animated films, such as Shrek the Third (2007), Monsters vs. Aliens (2009), DC League of Super-Pets (2022), Monsters University (2013), and the English dub of The Wind Rises (2013).

== Acting credits ==
Key
†	Denotes films that have not yet been released

=== Film ===
Year	Title	Role	Notes / Ref.
2000	State and Main	Judge's Assistant	Uncredited
2002	Fighting Still Life	Tyler	Short film
2002	Alma Mater	Flea Club Candidate 1	
2004	Kinsey	Ben	
2004	Taxi	Messenger No. 3	
2005	Duane Hopwood	Bob Flynn	
2005	Jarhead	Corporal Harrigan	
2006	Doogal	Additional Voices	American version only
2006	A New Wave	Gideon	
2006	For Your Consideration	Paper Badge Officer	
2006	The Holiday	Ben	
2006	Dreamgirls	Sam Walsh	
2007	Smiley Face	Brevin	
2007	Shrek the Third	Sir Lancelot	Voice Cameo
2007	License to Wed	Ben Murphy	
2008	Leatherheads	Carter Rutherford	
2009	Brief Interviews with Hideous Men	Ryan / Subject No. 20	
2009	Monsters vs. Aliens	Cuthbert	Voice cameo
2009	Away We Go	Burt Farlander	
2009	It's Complicated	Harley	
2011	Something Borrowed	Ethan	
2011	The Muppets	Himself	cameo
2012	Nobody Walks	Peter	
2012	Big Miracle	Adam Carlson	
2012	Promised Land	Dustin Noble	
2013	Monsters University	"Frightening" Frank McCay	Voice cameo
2013	The Wind Rises	Honjo	Voice; English dub
2014	The Prophet	Halim	Voice
2015	Aloha	John "Woody" Woodside	
2016	13 Hours: The Secret Soldiers of Benghazi	Jack Silva	
2016	The Hollars	John Hollar	
2016	Past Forward	Man No. 1	Short film
2017	Born in China	Narrator	Documentary
2017	Animal Crackers	Owen Huntington	Voice
2017	Detroit	Norman Lippitt	
2018	A Quiet Place	Lee Abbott	
2018	Next Gen	7723	Voice
2020	A Quiet Place Part II	Lee Abbott	
2021	Free Guy	Silhouetted Gamer	Voice cameo
2022	Doctor Strange in the Multiverse of Madness	Reed Richards / Mister Fantastic (Earth-838)	cameo
2022	DC League of Super-Pets	Kal-El / Clark Kent / Superman	Voice
2024	IF	Bea's Dad / Marshmallow Man (voice)	Dual role
2025	Fountain of Youth	Luke Purdue	
2026	Jack Ryan: Ghost War	Jack Ryan	

=== Television ===
Year	Title	Role	Notes / Ref.
2003	Ed	Process server	Episode: "Good Advice"
2004	Law & Order: Criminal Intent	Jace Gleesing	Episode: "Mad Hops"
2005–2013	The Office	Jim Halpert	Main role; 201 episodes
2005	Without a Trace	Curtis Horne	Episode: "The Bogie Man"
2005	CSI: Crime Scene Investigation	Lyle Davis	Episode: "Who Shot Sherlock"
2006	American Dad!	Gilbert (voice)	Episode: "Irregarding Steve"
2012	30 Rock	Himself	Episode: "The Ballad of Kenneth Parcell"
2012	Head Games	Narrator	3 episodes
2013	Arrested Development	Spyder Foode	Episode: "The B. Team"
2014–2015	BoJack Horseman	Secretariat (voice)	Episodes "Later" and "The Shot"
2015	Lip Sync Battle	Himself	Episode: "John Krasinski vs. Anna Kendrick"
2016	Robot Chicken	Commercial Director / Mike Brady (voices)	Episode: "Secret of the Flushed Footlong"
2018–2023	Jack Ryan	Jack Ryan	Lead role; 30 episodes
2021	Saturday Night Live	Himself (host)	Episode: "John Krasinski/Machine Gun Kelly"

=== Stage ===
Year	Title	Role	Notes / Ref.
2016	Dry Powder	Seth	The Public Theater, Off-Broadway
2025	Angry Alan	Roger	Off-Broadway

== Filmmaking credits ==
=== Film ===
Year	Title	Director	Producer	Writer
2009	Brief Interviews with Hideous Men	Yes	Yes	Yes
2012	Promised Land	No	Yes	Yes
2016	The Hollars	Yes	Yes	No
2018	A Quiet Place	Yes	Executive	Yes
2020	A Quiet Place Part II	Yes	Yes	Yes
2024	IF	Yes	Yes	Yes
2024	A Quiet Place: Day One	No	Yes	Story
2026	Jack Ryan: Ghost War	No	Yes	Yes
2027	A Quiet Place Part III	Yes	Yes	Yes

Producer only

- Manchester by the Sea (2016, executive)
- Apartment 7A (2024)

=== Television ===
Year	Title	Director	Producer	Notes / Ref.
2005–2013	The Office	Yes	Yes	Directed: "Sabre", "Lotto" and "The Boat"
2015–2019	Lip Sync Battle	No	Executive	Also co-creator
2016–2020	Dream Corp, LLC	No	Executive	
2018–2023	Jack Ryan	No	Executive	
2023	Curses!	No	Executive	

== Web series ==
Year	Title	Role	Notes / Ref.
2020	Some Good News	Host	9 episodes; also creator, writer, and producer
