= List of awards and nominations received by John Krasinski =

John Krasinski awards and nominations
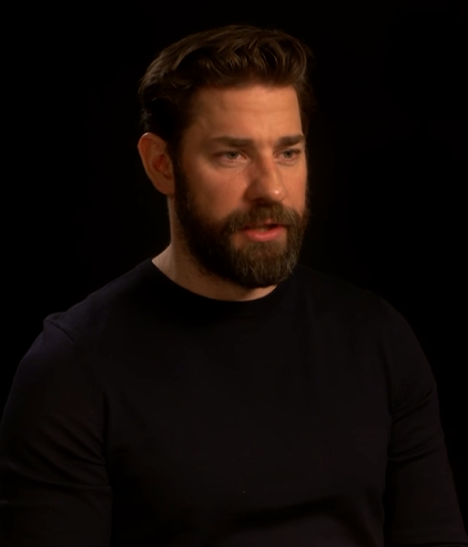
- Krasinski in 2018
Award	Wins	Nominations
Actor Awards	2	8
Children's and Family Emmy Awards	0	1
Primetime Emmy Awards	0	5
Producers Guild of America Awards	0	2
Writers Guild of America Awards	0	1

Actor and filmmaker John Krasinski has received various awards and nominations, including nominations for five Emmy Awards and two Producers Guild of America Awards as a producer for the sitcom The Office and the reality competition series Lip Sync Battle. He also received a Writers Guild of America Award nomination as a co-writer of the post-apocalyptic horror film A Quiet Place (2018). For his work in the off-Broadway play, Angry Alan, Krasinski received nominations for outstanding lead performance at the 2026 Drama Desk and Lucille Lortel awards.

== Major associations ==
=== Actor Awards ===
Year	Category	Nominated work	Result	Ref.
2007	Outstanding Performance by an Ensemble in a Comedy Series	The Office	Won	
2008	Outstanding Performance by an Ensemble in a Comedy Series	The Office	Won	
2009	Outstanding Performance by an Ensemble in a Comedy Series	The Office	Nominated	
2010	Outstanding Performance by an Ensemble in a Comedy Series	The Office	Nominated	
2011	Outstanding Performance by an Ensemble in a Comedy Series	The Office	Nominated	
2012	Outstanding Performance by an Ensemble in a Comedy Series	The Office	Nominated	
2013	Outstanding Performance by an Ensemble in a Comedy Series	The Office	Nominated	
2019	Outstanding Performance by a Male Actor in a Drama Series	Jack Ryan	Nominated	

=== Drama Desk Awards ===
Year	Category	Nominated work	Result	Ref.
2026	Outstanding Lead Performance in a Play	Angry Alan	Nominated	

=== Emmy Awards ===
Year	Category	Nominated work	Result	Ref.
Primetime Emmy Awards
2013	Outstanding Special Class - Short-Format Nonfiction Programs	The Office: The Farewells	Nominated	
2016	Outstanding Structured Reality Program	Lip Sync Battle	Nominated	
2017	Outstanding Structured Reality Program	Lip Sync Battle	Nominated	
2018	Outstanding Structured Reality Program	Lip Sync Battle	Nominated	
2026	Outstanding Movie	Tom Clancy's Jack Ryan: Ghost War	Nominated	
Children's and Family Emmy Awards
2025	Outstanding Children's or Young Teen Animated Series	Curses!	Nominated	

=== Producers Guild of America Awards ===
Year	Category	Nominated work	Result	Ref.
2017	Outstanding Producer of Competition Television	Lip Sync Battle	Nominated	
2018	Outstanding Producer of Competition Television	Lip Sync Battle	Nominated	

=== Writers Guild of America Awards ===
Year	Category	Nominated work	Result	Ref.
2019	Best Original Screenplay	A Quiet Place	Nominated	

== Other awards ==
=== Annie Awards ===
Year	Category	Nominated work	Result	Ref.
2024	Best Animated Television/Media Production for Children's Audience	Curses!	Nominated	

=== AACTA Awards ===
Year	Category	Nominated work	Result	Ref.
2018	International Award for Best Screenplay	A Quiet Place	Nominated	

=== African American Film Critics Association ===
Year	Category	Nominated work	Result	Ref.
2017	Best Ensemble	Detroit	Won	

=== Bram Stoker Award ===
Year	Category	Nominated work	Result	Ref.
2018	Superior Achievement in a Screenplay	A Quiet Place	Nominated	

=== Christopher Award ===
Year	Category	Nominated work	Result	Ref.
2017	Best Feature Film	The Hollars	Nominated	

=== Critics' Choice Movie Awards ===
Year	Category	Nominated work	Result	Ref.
2019	Best Sci-Fi/Horror Movie	A Quiet Place	Won	
2019	Best Original Screenplay	A Quiet Place	Nominated	
2019	Best Structured Series	Lip Sync Battle	Nominated	
2021	Best Voice Actor in an Animated Movie	Animal Crackers	Nominated	
2022	Best Horror Movie	A Quiet Place Part II	Won	
2023	Best Actor in an Action Series, Limited Series or TV Movie	Jack Ryan	Nominated	
2024	Best Actor in an Action Series, Limited Series or TV Movie	Jack Ryan	Nominated	

=== Environmental Media Awards ===
Year	Category	Recognized work	Ref.
2013	EFA Award for Feature Film	Promised Land	

=== Fangoria Chainsaw Awards ===
Year	Category	Nominated work	Result	Ref.
2019	Best Wide Release Movie	A Quiet Place	Nominated	
2019	Best Director	A Quiet Place	Nominated	
2019	Best Screenplay	A Quiet Place	Nominated	
2022	Best Wide Release Movie	A Quiet Place Part II	Nominated	

=== Florida Film Critics Circle Awards ===
Year	Category	Nominated work	Result	Ref.
2018	Best Original Screenplay	A Quiet Place	Nominated	

=== Georgia Film Critics Association ===
Year	Category	Nominated work	Result	Ref.
2018	Best Original Screenplay	A Quiet Place	Nominated	

=== Hollywood Creative Alliance / The Astra Awards ===
Year	Category	Nominated work	Result	Ref.
2018	Best Original Screenplay	A Quiet Place	Nominated	
2018	Best Picture	A Quiet Place	Nominated	
2021	Midseason Award for Best Filmmaker	A Quiet Place Part II	Nominated	
2021	Midseason Award for Best Screenplay	A Quiet Place Part II	Nominated	
2021	Midseason Award for Best Picture	A Quiet Place Part II	Nominated	
2022	HCA Award for Best Horror Film	A Quiet Place Part II	Nominated	
2024	Best Animated Series or TV Movie	Curses!	Nominated	

=== Hugo Award ===
Year	Category	Nominated work	Result	Ref.
2019	Hugo Award for Best Dramatic Presentation	A Quiet Place	Nominated	

=== IGN Awards ===
Year	Category	Nominated work	Result	Ref.
2018	IGN Award for Best Director	A Quiet Place	Nominated	
2018	IGN People's Choice Award for Best Director	A Quiet Place	Won	

=== Kansas City Film Critics Circle ===
Year	Category	Nominated work	Result	Ref.
2018	Vince Koehler Award For Best SciFi/Horror/Fantasy	A Quiet Place	Won	

=== Lucille Lortel Awards ===
Year	Category	Nominated work	Result	Ref.
2026	Outstanding Lead Performer in a Play	Angry Alan	Nominated	

=== Media Access Awards ===
Year	Category	Recognized work	Ref.
2018	Writers Guild of America, West Evan Somers Memorial Award (shared with Scott Beck and Bryan Woods)	A Quiet Place	
2021	Excellence in Directing	A Quiet Place Part II	

=== NAACP Image Awards ===
Year	Category	Nominated work	Result	Ref.
2017	Image Award for Outstanding Variety or Game Show - (Series or Special)	Lip Sync Battle	Nominated	
2018	Image Award for Outstanding Variety or Game Show - (Series or Special)	Lip Sync Battle	Won	

=== National Board of Review ===
Year	Category	Nominated work	Result	Ref.
2009	Best Ensemble	It's Complicated	Won	
2012	Top Films	Promised Land	Won	
2018	Top Films	A Quiet Place	Won	

=== Nebula Award ===
Year	Category	Nominated work	Result	Ref.
2018	Ray Bradbury Award for Outstanding Dramatic Presentation	A Quiet Place	Nominated	

=== People's Choice Awards ===
Year	Category	Nominated work	Result	Ref.
2018	Drama Movie Star	A Quiet Place	Nominated	
2021	Drama Movie of 2021	A Quiet Place Part II	Nominated	

=== San Diego Film Critics Society Awards ===
Year	Category	Nominated work	Result	Ref.
2018	Best Director	A Quiet Place	Nominated	
2018	Best Original Screenplay	A Quiet Place	Nominated	

=== Satellite Awards ===
Year	Category	Nominated work	Result	Ref.
2018	Best Screenplay, Original	A Quiet Place	Nominated	

=== Saturn Awards ===
Year	Category	Nominated work	Result	Ref.
2019	Best Actor in Streaming Presentation	Jack Ryan	Nominated	
2019	Best Writing	A Quiet Place	Won	
2019	Best Horror Film	A Quiet Place	Won	
2021	Saturn Award for Best Action/Thriller TV Show	Jack Ryan	Nominated	
2022	Best Horror Film	A Quiet Place Part II	Nominated	
2023	Saturn Award for Best Action/Adventure/Thriller Television Series	Jack Ryan	Nominated	

=== Savannah Film Festival ===
Year	Category	Nominated work	Result	Ref.
2018	Vanguard Award	Career Achievement	Won	

=== Smithsonian magazine ===
Year	Category	Recognized work	Ref.
2018	American Ingenuity Award – Visual Arts	A Quiet Place	

=== Streamy Awards ===
Year	Category	Nominated work	Result	Ref.
2020	Best Live Special	Some Good News	Nominated	

=== Sundance Film Festival ===
Year	Category	Nominated work	Result	Ref.
2009	Grand Jury Prize	Brief Interviews with Hideous Men	Nominated	

=== St. Louis Film Critics Association ===
Year	Category	Nominated work	Result	Ref.
2018	Best Original Screenplay	A Quiet Place	Nominated	
2021	Best Horror Film	A Quiet Place Part II	Won	

=== Teen Choice Awards ===
Year	Category	Nominated work	Result	Ref.
2011	Choice Movie Actor: Romantic Comedy	Something Borrowed	Nominated	
2011	Choice TV Actor: Comedy	The Office	Nominated	

=== Theatre World Award ===
Year	Category	Nominated work	Result	Ref.
2016	Outstanding Debut Performance (shared with 11 actors)	Dry Powder	Won	

=== Webby Awards ===
Year	Category	Nominated work	Result	Ref.
2019	People's Voice - Variety & Reality Video	John Krasinski Breaks Down A Quiet Place's Lantern Scene - Notes on a Scene - Vanity Fair	Won	
2019	Trailer Video	Dream Corp LLC Dream Sequence	Nominated	
2020	Special Achievement	Some Good News	Won	

== Honorary awards ==
Year	Organisation	Category	Result	Ref.
2019	Brown University	Honorary Doctorate in Fine Arts	Honored	
