= Sycamore Pictures =

American film production company

- Company type: Private
- Industry: Motion picture
- Founded: 2011
- Founder: Ben Nearn; Tom Rice
- Headquarters: Los Angeles, California
- Key people: Ben Nearn; Tom Rice
- Products: Film production
- Website: sycamorepictures.com

Sycamore Pictures is an American production company founded by producers Ben Nearn and Tom Rice.

== History ==
The company was formed in 2011 with a focus on producing films with a "more redemptive tone" suitable for families. Nearn, formerly an investment banker who moved on to become COO and a minority investor in Cross Creek Pictures, maintains the company's Memphis offices; Rice, an independent film producer and writer, maintains the Los Angeles office. The startup funds for Sycamore were raised by Nearn from investors both from the Memphis area and elsewhere, with a business model based on profit participation by actors, directors and creative personnel.

The company's first production, The Way Way Back, had its debut at the Sundance Film Festival in 2013, where distribution rights were purchased for US$9.75 million, reportedly the largest distribution deal made at the festival that year.

Begin Again (2014) has been described as "an old-fashioned, let’s-put-on-a-show movie musical disguised as an indie relationship drama" and as "that real rarity, a feel-good story of friendship — not sexual love — between a man and woman."

Merry Friggin' Christmas, scheduled for release in late 2014, features Robin Williams in the last movie he made before his death in 2014.

== Filmography ==
Year	Film	Director	Other notes
2013	The Way, Way Back	Nat Faxon and Jim Rash	co-production with The Walsh Company and OddLot Entertainment; distributed by Fox Searchlight Pictures; Sycamore's first film
2013	Begin Again	John Carney	co-production with Exclusive Media, Black Label Media, Likely Story and Apatow Productions; distributed by The Weinstein Company
2014	A Merry Friggin' Christmas	Tristram Shapeero	distributed by Phase 4 Films and Entertainment One Films
2015	Mississippi Grind	Anna Boden and Ryan Fleck	co-production with Electric City Entertainment; distributed by A24, DirecTV (United States) and Annapurna International (international)
2016	The Hollars	John Krasinski	co-production with Groundswell Productions and Sunday Night Productions; distributed by Sony Pictures Classics
2016	Collide	Eran Creevy	co-production with IM Global, DMG Entertainment, Silver Pictures, Hands-on Producers GmbH, 42 and Automatik Entertainment; distributed by Open Road Films (United States) and Universum Film (Germany)
2017	Speech & Debate	Dan Harris	distributed by Vertical Entertainment
2020	Greyhound	Aaron Schneider	co-production with Sony Pictures Entertainment, Stage 6 Films, FilmNation Entertainment, Bron Creative, Zhengfu Pictures and Playtone; distributed by Apple TV+
