= Sunday Night Productions =

American film and television production company

- Logo used since 2015
- Type: Private
- Industry: Production company
- Founded: 2013; 13 years ago
- Founders: John Krasinski; Allyson Seeger
- Headquarters: U.S.
- Key people: John Krasinski (Chairman and CEO)

Sunday Night Productions is an American film and television production company founded by John Krasinski and Allyson Seeger in 2013. It has produced the television series Lip Sync Battle, Dream Corp LLC, and Jack Ryan, the YouTube streaming news show Some Good News (2020), and the films Brief Interviews with Hideous Men (2009), Promised Land (2012), The Hollars (2016), and A Quiet Place (2018).

== History ==
In 2013, John Krasinski and Allyson Seeger formed Sunday Night Productions with Krasinski's earnings from The Office. In May 2014, Krasinski and Seeger produced his film The Hollars, which was acquired by Sony Pictures Classics. In September 2014, Krasinski would produce both Shawn Wines' law student turned garbage collection comedy, as well as Josh Siegal and Dylan Morgan's workplace/family hybrid through Sunday Night for NBC, but, there have been no further developments for both shows. In November 2015, it was announced that Krasinski and Seeger will co-produce Dream Corp, LLC with Stephen Merchant for Adult Swim. In September 2016, it was announced that Krasinski and Seeger will co-produce Alex Carter's adaptation of the My Bad Parent book and blog for Fox, but there have been no further developments since. In March 2017, it was announced that Krasinski and Seeger will co-produce the film A Quiet Place with Platinum Dunes for Paramount Pictures, with Krasinski also co-writing and directing.

=== Projects previously and currently in development ===
In 2013, Krasinski sold a spec script to produce an action-adventure movie he wrote with Oren Uziel for Warner Bros. In April 2018, Krasinski and Platinum Dunes announced the production of the sci-fi thriller Life on Mars, based on a short story by Cecil Castellucci for Paramount. In May 2018, Sunday Night announced the production of Krasinski and Aaron Sorkin's Chateut Marmont miniseries The Hotel on Sunset, for HBO. In July 2018, Sunday Night announced the co-production of a Marc Rich biopic with Matt Damon in talks to play Rich. On March 22, 2019, Sunday Night announced the production of the film adaptation of Rebecca Alexander's memoir Not Fade Away for Annapurna Pictures along with David O. Russell, with Emily Blunt in talks to play Alexander. In November 2020, Krasinski announced the production of A Quiet Place: Day One, which Jeff Nichols will be originally attached to write and direct before Michael Sarnoski took over. In March 2021, Krasinski and Platinum Dunes announced the production of Natalie Erika James' psychological thriller Apartment 7A, for Paramount Players. In May 2021, the company signed a first look deal with Paramount, which was extended further in April 2024.

== Filmography ==
=== Films ===
Year	Title	Director	Distributor(s)	Notes	Budget	Gross (worldwide)
2009	Brief Interviews with Hideous Men	John Krasinski	IFC Films	with Woodshed Entertainment and Salty Features	—N/a	$33,745
2012	Promised Land	Gus Van Sant	Focus Features	with Participant Media, Image Nation Abu Dhabi and Pearl Street Films	$15 million	$11 million
2016	The Hollars	John Krasinski	Sony Pictures Classics	with Groundswell Productions and Sycamore Pictures	$3.8 million	$1.1 million
2018	A Quiet Place	John Krasinski	Paramount Pictures	with Platinum Dunes	$17 million	$350.3 million
2020	A Quiet Place Part II	John Krasinski	Paramount Pictures	with Platinum Dunes	$55 million	$297.4 million
2024	IF	John Krasinski	Paramount Pictures	with Maximum Effort	$110 million	$181.3 million
2024	A Quiet Place: Day One	Michael Sarnoski	Paramount Pictures	with Platinum Dunes	$67 million	$261.8 million
2024	Apartment 7A	Natalie Erika James	Paramount Pictures	with Paramount Players and Platinum Dunes	—N/a	—N/a
2026	Jack Ryan: Ghost War	Andrew Bernstein	Amazon MGM Studios	with Paramount Pictures	—N/a	—N/a

=== Television ===
Year	Title	Creator(s)	Network	Notes
2015–2019	Lip Sync Battle	John Krasinski; Stephen Merchant	Paramount Network	with Eight Million Plus Productions, Matador Content, Four Eyes Entertainment and Casey Patterson Entertainment
2016–2020	Dream Corp LLC	Daniel Stessen	Adult Swim	with Caviar Content (season 1), Alive and Kicking, Inc. (season 2) and Williams Street
2018–2023	Jack Ryan	Carlton Cuse; Graham Roland	Amazon Prime Video	with Amazon Studios, Paramount Television Studios, Platinum Dunes, Skydance Television, Genre Arts, and Push, Boot. (seasons 1–2)
2020	Some Good News	John Krasinski	YouTube	—N/a
2023–2024	Curses!	Jim Cooper; Jeff Dixon	Apple TV+	with DreamWorks Animation Television

=== Upcoming ===
==== Films ====
- A Quiet Place Part III (with Paramount Pictures)
- The King of Oil (with Universal Pictures)
- Not Fade Away (with Annapurna Pictures)
- Life on Mars (with Paramount Pictures)
- Untitled action-adventure film (with Warner Bros. Pictures)

==== Television ====
- The Hotel on Sunset (with Warner Bros. Television)

== Awards and recognition ==
=== Critics' Choice Awards ===
Year	Category	Nominated work	Result	Ref.
2019	Best Sci-Fi/Horror Movie	A Quiet Place	Won	
2019	Best Structured Series	Lip Sync Battle	Nominated	

=== Emmy Awards ===
Year	Category	Nominated work	Result	Ref.
2018	Outstanding Structured Reality Program	Lip Sync Battle	Nominated	
2017	Outstanding Structured Reality Program	Lip Sync Battle	Nominated	
2016	Outstanding Structured Reality Program	Lip Sync Battle	Nominated	

=== Producers Guild of America Awards ===
Year	Category	Nominated work	Result	Ref.
2018	Outstanding Producer of Competition Television	Lip Sync Battle	Nominated	
2017	Outstanding Producer of Competition Television	Lip Sync Battle	Nominated	

=== Webby Awards ===
Year	Category	Nominated work	Result	Ref.
2020	Webby Award for Special Achievement	Some Good News	Won	
2019	Webby Award for Video - Trailer	Dream Corp LLC Dream Sequence	Nominated	
