= IF (film) =

2024 film by John Krasinski

- Theatrical release poster
- Directed by: John Krasinski
- Written by: John Krasinski
- Produced by: Allyson Seeger; John Krasinski; Andrew Form; Ryan Reynolds
- Starring: Cailey Fleming; Ryan Reynolds; John Krasinski; Fiona Shaw; Phoebe Waller-Bridge; Louis Gossett Jr.; Steve Carell
- Cinematography: Janusz Kamiński
- Edited by: Christopher Rouse; Andy Canny
- Music by: Michael Giacchino
- Production companies: Sunday Night Productions; Maximum Effort
- Distributed by: Paramount Pictures
- Release dates: May 8, 2024 (France); May 17, 2024 (United States)
- Running time: 104 minutes
- Country: United States
- Language: English
- Budget: $110 million
- Box office: $190.3 million

IF (also marketed as Imaginary Friends in some regions) is a 2024 American live-action animated fantasy comedy film written and directed by John Krasinski, who also produced it alongside Allyson Seeger, Andrew Form, and Ryan Reynolds. The film stars Cailey Fleming, Reynolds, Krasinski, and Fiona Shaw along with the voices of Phoebe Waller-Bridge, Louis Gossett Jr., and Steve Carell. Combining live-action and animation, the film follows a young girl (Fleming) who goes through a difficult experience and begins to see everyone's imaginary friends who have been left behind as their children have grown up.

Development of the film began in 2019, with Krasinski set to write and direct and Reynolds attached to star. The rest of the cast joined between October 2021 and January 2022, and filming took place in New York City between August of that year and May 2023. IF was theatrically released by Paramount Pictures in the United States on May 17, 2024. The film received mixed reviews from critics and grossed over $190.3 million against a budget of $110 million.

== Plot ==
Twelve-year-old Bea moves into her grandmother Margaret's apartment in New York while her father awaits heart surgery in the same hospital where her mother died years earlier. Bea insists that she is not a child, but that night, while watching Harvey on television, she hears something in the other room; looking into a closet, she finds some of her childhood things. Later, she sees an unfamiliar creature and follows it back to her grandmother's building. The next night, she sees it again, accompanied by a mysterious man, and follows them to a nearby house where the man, Calvin, retrieves a large, furry, purple creature named Blue. Bea then meets the other creature, a butterfly-like being named Blossom, and faints. Bea awakens in Cal's apartment, where she learns that he has been working with imaginary friends (IFs) to place them with new children as their original children have grown up and forgotten them. Initially reluctant, she decides to help Cal.

The next day, Cal takes Bea to Memory Lane Retirement Home, a retirement community for forgotten IFs housed underneath a swing ride at Coney Island as he is tripped by an invisible IF named Keith. An elderly teddy bear IF named Lewis inspires her to use her imagination to redesign the facility. Bea tries to match one of the IFs with Benjamin, a young patient at the hospital, but he is unable to see any of them. Lewis suggests that IFs might not need new children, but rather to reunite with their old ones.

Margaret tells Bea about her childhood dream of becoming a dancer. Bea recognizes Blossom in one of Margaret's childhood photographs. Blossom acknowledges being Margaret's IF, but Margaret can no longer see her. Bea tries to stir Margaret's memory by playing a phonograph record, which inspires Margaret to dance. While Margaret relives her childhood dream, Blossom glows and grows butterfly wings.

Following a tip, Bea, Cal, and Blue find Blue's creator Jeremy Griffith, now a man anxiously trying to make a business deal. With Bea's help, Jeremy is reminded of his childhood, causing Blue to glow. Blue then touches Jeremy, who had frozen outside his business meeting, and the glow spreads to Jeremy as Blue tells him "you're okay". Jeremy then begins his business presentation with newfound confidence. Blue's achievement is celebrated at Memory Lane, where Bea says that she and Cal make a good team.

Bea returns to Margaret's apartment to find Margaret worried about Bea's father, who has undergone his surgery. Comforted by Cal, Bea confides that she does not want to say goodbye to her dad, so he suggests she tell him a story instead. At the hospital, Bea tells her unresponsive father a story about how she was pushing herself to act like a grown-up when she is just a child who still needs her father. He awakens, much to her relief. When Bea exits his hospital room, all of the IFs who had accompanied her to the hospital have vanished.

Returning to her grandmother's building, Bea tries to thank Cal only to discover that the door to his apartment opens into an old storage room. After her dad is released from the hospital, he and Bea pack to return home. During this, Bea realizes from an old picture she painted that Cal is her own IF, whom she had forgotten after her mother's death. Bea rushes to Cal's room and thanks him for helping, telling him that she will always need him. This allows her to see Cal and the IFs again, and they reunite one last time, a glow spreading between them.

As Bea and her father leave, Margaret speaks with Blossom, now able to see her. Cal continues reuniting the IFs with their grown-up humans, and Benjamin meets his IF, a cartoonish, bespectacled physician dragon with similar injuries. At their home, Bea's father trips and quotes "Hey Keith".

== Cast ==
- Cailey Fleming as Bea, a girl who can see IFs
  - Audrey Hoffman as young Bea
- Ryan Reynolds as Cal, Bea's neighbor who can also see IFs
- John Krasinski as Bea's father
- Fiona Shaw as Bea's grandmother (Note: Despite being named Margaret, the character was credited as "Bea's grandmother".)
- Alan Kim as Benjamin, a boy recuperating in the hospital from his injuries
- Liza Colón-Zayas as Janet, a nurse who watches over Bea's father
- Bobby Moynihan as Jeremy Griffith, a businessman who was the creator of Blue
  - David Weissmann as young Jeremy
- Catharine Daddario as Bea's mother
- Barbara Andres as the Woman Upstairs, the unnamed elderly landlady of the building that Bea's grandmother lives in.

=== Voices ===
- Steve Carell as Blue, a large purple monster IF
- Phoebe Waller-Bridge as Blossom, a Rubber hose animation-style butterfly-like IF
- Louis Gossett Jr. as Lewis, an elderly teddy bear IF who runs the Memory Lane Retirement Home
- Awkwafina as Bubble, (Note: Despite introducing herself as Pop, the character was credited as "Bubble".) an IF composed of a bunch of bubbles that can pop and reconstitute themselves
- Emily Blunt as Unicorn, (Note: Despite introducing herself as Uni, the character was credited as "Unicorn".) a plush unicorn IF with a pink and green mane
- George Clooney as Spaceman, an astronaut IF
- Bradley Cooper as Ice, (Note: Despite being named Ken, the character was credited as "Ice".) an IF who resembles an anthropomorphic glass of ice water
- Matt Damon as Flower, (Note: Despite being named Sunny in the IF dossier and introducing himself by that name, the character was credited as "Flower".) an IF who resembles an anthropomorphic sunflower in a plaid suit
- Bill Hader as Banana, an anthropomorphic banana IF who works as a water aerobics instructor at the Memory Lane Retirement Home
- Richard Jenkins as Art Teacher, a lay figure IF who works as the art teacher at the Memory Lane Retirement Home
- Keegan-Michael Key as Slime, (Note: Despite introducing himself as Steven, the character was credited as "Slime".) an IF who resembles a green slime blob
- John Krasinski as Marshmallow, an anthropomorphic marshmallow IF whose head is always on fire
- Blake Lively as Octopuss, (Note: Despite being named Octo Cat in the IF dossier, the character was credited as "Octopuss".) an anthropomorphic cat IF who wears an octopus costume
- Allyson Seeger as Viola, an anthropomorphic viola IF with sunglasses
- Sebastian Maniscalco as Magician Mouse, an anthropomorphic mouse IF who is dressed like a magician
- Christopher Meloni as Cosmo, a detective IF with an obscured face
- Matthew Rhys as Ghost, (Note: Despite introducing himself as Andromedus III, the character was credited as "Ghost".) a crown-wearing ghost IF
- Sam Rockwell as Guardian Dog, an anthropomorphic dog superhero IF
- Maya Rudolph as Ally, an anthropomorphic plush alligator IF
- Amy Schumer as Gummy Bear, a large gummy bear IF
- Jon Stewart as Robot, an 1980s-style toy robot IF in a domed helmet and one large wheel instead of legs

== Production ==
In October 2019, Paramount Pictures outbid Lionsgate and Sony, among other studios, to purchase the rights to Imaginary Friends, a project developed by John Krasinski and Ryan Reynolds, with Krasinski set to write and direct it. In May 2021, Krasinski's Sunday Night Productions and Reynolds's Maximum Effort signed first-look deals with Paramount. In October 2021, Phoebe Waller-Bridge and Fiona Shaw joined the cast. In January 2022, Steve Carell, Alan Kim, Cailey Fleming, and Louis Gossett Jr. joined the cast, with the film retitled IF. The film reunites Krasinski and Carell, who both starred in The Office (2005–2013) as Jim Halpert and Michael Scott, respectively. In August 2022, Bobby Moynihan was added to the cast. Principal photography began on August 31, 2022, with Janusz Kamiński as cinematographer, and wrapped by early May 2023. Framestore provided the visual effects and animation. Animation director Arslan Elver and VFX supervisor Chris Lawrence worked alongside Krasinski on set and during pre- and post-production.

The film's end credits include Brad Pitt as Keith, an invisible IF with no lines, understood to be just offscreen when other characters trip over him. Pitt's credit is a reference to his cameo as Vanisher in Deadpool 2 (2018), co-starring Reynolds. The film is dedicated to Gossett Jr., who died before its release.

== Music ==
Michael Giacchino composed the score for the film. The film's soundtrack includes Tina Turner’s "Better Be Good to Me", Nat King Cole's "L-O-V-E" and the "Adagio for Spartacus and Phyrigia" from Aram Khachaturian’s Spartacus.

== Release ==
=== Theatrical ===
IF was released by Paramount Pictures in the United States on May 17, 2024, after its originally scheduled release date of November 17, 2023, was first pushed to May 24, 2024, and then shifted forward by one week.

=== Home media ===
The film was released on digital platforms by Paramount Home Entertainment on June 18, 2024. It began streaming on Paramount+ on July 9, 2024, and was released on Ultra HD Blu-ray, Blu-ray, and DVD on August 13, 2024.

== Reception ==
=== Box office ===
IF grossed $111.1 million in the United States and Canada, and $79.2 million in other territories, for a total of $190.3 million worldwide. Variety estimated the film would need to gross $275 million worldwide in order to break-even.

In the United States and Canada, IF was released alongside The Strangers: Chapter 1 and Back to Black, and was originally projected to gross around $40 million from 4,041 theaters in its opening weekend. After making $10.3 million on its first day (including $1.8 million from Thursday night previews), weekend estimates were lowered to $30 million. It went on to debut to $33.7 million, topping the box office. In its second weekend, the film made $16.8 million (a drop of 53%), finishing third behind newcomers Furiosa: A Mad Max Saga and The Garfield Movie. In France, the film made $3.3 million during its opening weekend in 621 cinemas.

=== Critical response ===
On the review aggregator website Rotten Tomatoes, 50% of 213 critics' reviews are positive, with an average rating of 5.8/10. The website's consensus reads: "A sweet ode to rediscovering one's inner child, IF largely works as old-fashioned family entertainment despite an occasionally unfocused and unnecessarily complicated plot." Metacritic, which uses a weighted average, assigned the film a score of 46 out of 100, based on 39 critics, indicating "mixed or average" reviews. Audiences polled by CinemaScore gave the film an average grade of "A" on an A+ to F scale, while those polled by PostTrak gave it an 84% overall positive score, with 64% saying they would definitely recommend it.

Adrian Horton of The Guardian awarded the film 3 out of 5 stars, writing that it "checks the boxes" on the elements of a family-friendly movie, but also noting that it does not "fully conjure the magic" of other films in the genre. Another mixed review was published on NPR by Bob Mondello, who wrote that "mostly the filmmakers detour, decorate and digitize their story rather than telling it, and that doesn't mesh well with the real-world stuff — dad's surgery, for instance, and Bea's wandering all over Brooklyn without her grandma seeming to notice. And yes, I know: IF is a kid-flick, but it still needs grounding. We're in Brooklyn, not Willy Wonkaland." RogerEbert.com reviewer Clint Worthington called the film "a well-intentioned misfire".

Tomris Laffly of Variety wrote that the movie was "in desperate need of some coherent world-building", while praising the performance of Cailey Fleming in the lead role. In a more negative review for The Hollywood Reporter, Frank Scheck criticised the film as "plagued by significant tonal shifts and pacing issues".

Noah Berlatsky of Chicago Reader was even more dismissive, stating, "IF makes you wish you were watching some other movie. (...) There's a fine line between the whimsical dream logic of Roald Dahl and irritating, incoherent nonsense. Director John Krasinski's new kids film IF is nowhere near that line. Despite the best efforts of the extremely talented child actor Cailey Fleming, IF makes no sense, narratively, emotionally, or visually."

Several critics noted that the film shares some similarities with the Cartoon Network animated series Foster's Home for Imaginary Friends, which features a similar care home for outgrown imaginary friends awaiting readoption. (Note: Attributed to multiple references:)

== See also ==
- Happy! (TV series) – a live-action adult crime comedy series with animated imaginary friends.
- Foster's Home for Imaginary Friends – a animated siticom comedy-fantasy adventure series with animation imaginary friends.
