= John Krasinski =

American actor and filmmaker (born 1979)

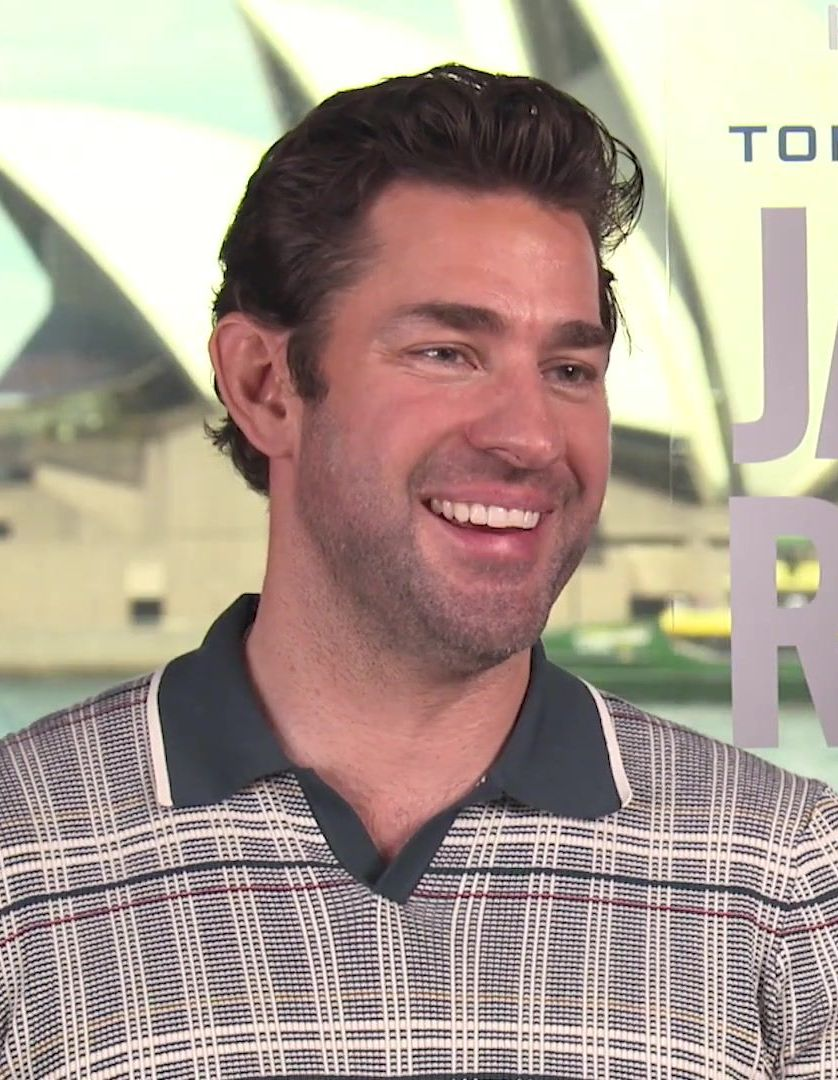
- Krasinski in 2022
- Born: John Burke Krasinski; October 20, 1979 (age 47); Boston, Massachusetts, U.S.
- Education: Brown University (BA)
- Occupations: Actor; film director; producer; screenwriter
- Years active: 2000–present
- Works: Filmography
- Spouse: Emily Blunt (m. 2010)
- Children: 2
- Awards: Full list

John Burke Krasinski (/krəˈzɪnski/; born October 20, 1979) is an American actor and filmmaker. He is known for his role as Jim Halpert on the NBC sitcom The Office (2005–2013), where he was also a producer and occasional director. He directed, co-wrote and co-starred in the 2018 horror film A Quiet Place, for which Time named him one of the 100 most influential people in the world. He has since written and directed the sequel A Quiet Place Part II (2020).

Krasinski has appeared in the films Leatherheads (2008), Away We Go (2009), It's Complicated (2009), Something Borrowed (2011), Promised Land (2012), and 13 Hours: The Secret Soldiers of Benghazi (2016). He directed and starred in the comedy-drama films Brief Interviews with Hideous Men (2009), The Hollars (2016) and IF (2024). From 2018 to 2023, he played the title character in the Amazon Prime Video thriller series Jack Ryan, and served as an executive producer for it.

Krasinski has also performed voice-over work in animated and documentary films, including in Monsters University (2013). He established a production company, Sunday Night Productions, in 2013. For co-creating the reality show Lip Sync Battle (2015–2019), he received three nominations for the Primetime Emmy Award for Outstanding Structured Reality Program.

== Early life and education ==
John Burke Krasinski was born on October 20, 1979, at Boston Medical Center – Brighton in Boston, Massachusetts, His mother, Mary Claire (née Doyle), is a nurse, and his father, Ronald Krasinski, is an internist. He is the youngest of their three children, all of whom are boys. His mother is of Irish ancestry, and his father is of Polish descent. He was raised Catholic.

Krasinski made his stage debut as Daddy Warbucks in a sixth-grade school production of the musical Annie. He co-starred in a satirical play written and cast by his future The Office co-star B. J. Novak when they were high school seniors. Krasinski and Novak graduated from Newton South High School in 1997.

Before entering college, Krasinski taught English as a foreign language instructor in Costa Rica for six months. While there, he saved a woman from drowning when she was caught in a rip tide at a beach in Manuel Antonio National Park. Krasinski said that what he learned from his mother, who was a lifeguard, helped him save the woman.

Krasinski attended Brown University, where he studied English and playwriting, and wrote an honors thesis, "Contents Under Pressure". He graduated from Brown in 2001. At Brown, he was a member of the sketch comedy group Out of Bounds and helped coach youth basketball at the Gordon School in East Providence, Rhode Island. He then attended the National Theater Institute in Waterford, Connecticut.

== Career ==
=== Early 2000s: Career begins ===
In 2000, Krasinski interned as a scriptwriter on the show Late Night with Conan O'Brien. After graduating from Brown University, he moved to New York to pursue acting. He appeared in commercials, guest-starred on television shows, and did readings of off-Broadway plays while working as a waiter. He starred in the play What the Eunuch Saw, written and directed by his former college classmates Emily O'Dell and Isaac Robert Hurwitz.

=== 2005–2009: Breakthrough with The Office and directorial debut ===
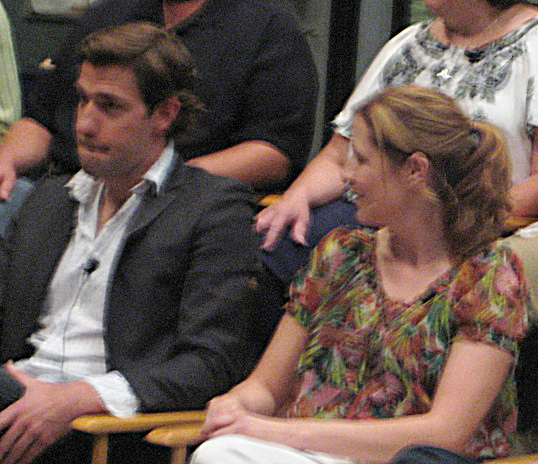
Krasinski with The Office co-star Jenna Fischer in 2009

Krasinski's breakthrough came in 2004 when he was cast in the NBC sitcom The Office, an American adaptation of the successful British TV series. In the series, a mockumentary about life at a mid-sized paper supply company, he played Jim Halpert, an intelligent and mild-mannered sales representative and, in later seasons, co-manager of the paper distribution company Dunder Mifflin in Scranton, Pennsylvania. Krasinski and Jenna Fischer's characters were also the series' love interests. To prepare for the role, Krasinski visited Scranton and interviewed employees at actual paper companies. He shot the Scranton footage used for the show's opening credits. He appeared in every episode of the series and also directed several, including "Sabre". For his work in the series (2005–2013), he earned approximately $100,000 per episode of the third season of The Office, four times his salary for the previous two seasons.

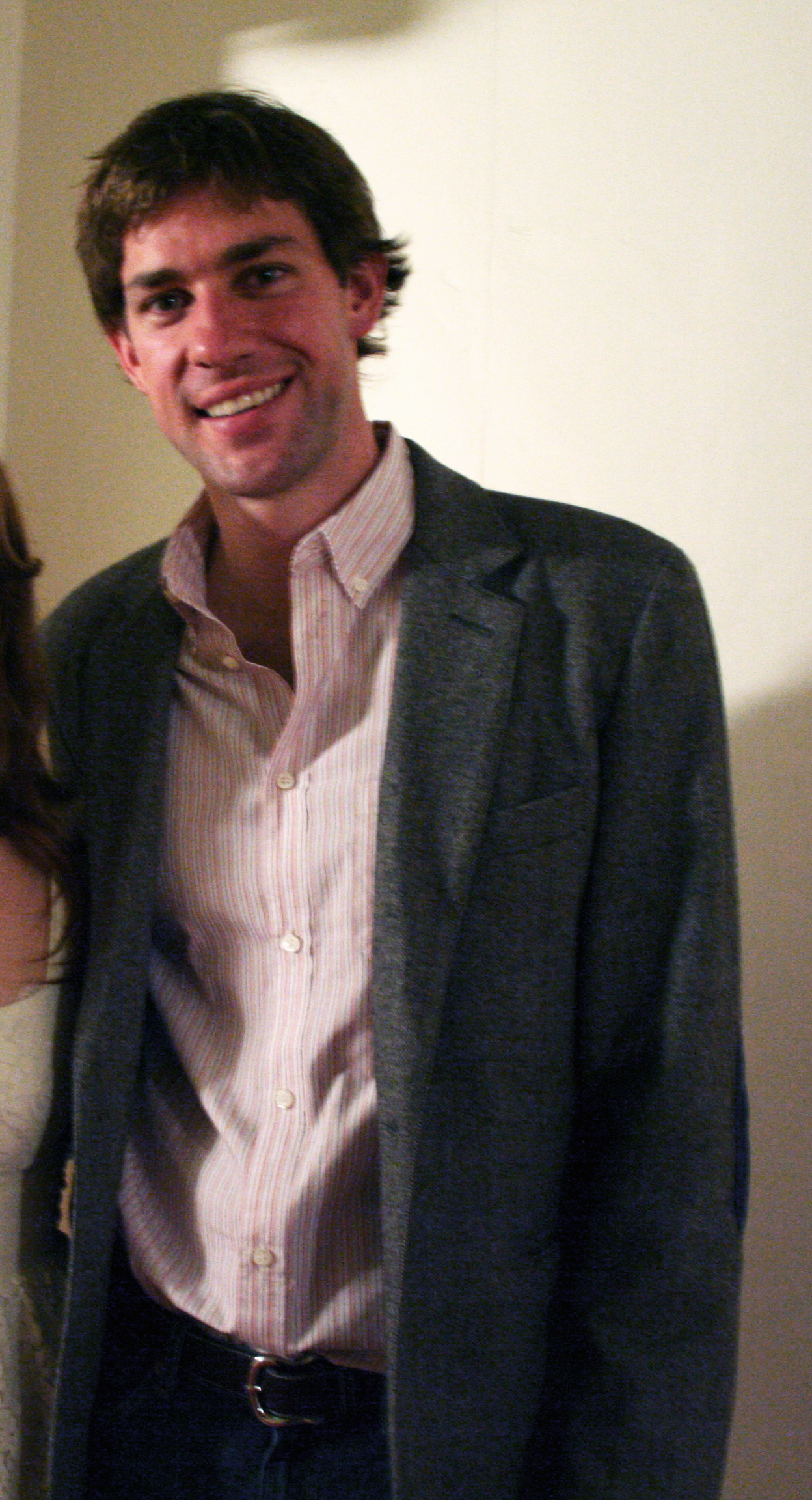
Krasinski in 2006

In 2006, Krasinski co-starred in Jason Carvey's independently produced, direct-to-DVD heist comedy A New Wave with Andrew Keegan and Lacey Chabert. In 2007, he co-starred with Anna Faris and Danny Masterson as Brevin in Gregg Araki's independent stoner comedy Smiley Face (2007). Reviews were largely positive for the film. Later that year, he starred in the romantic comedy License to Wed (2007) with Mandy Moore and Robin Williams. Despite negative critical reception of the film, it emerged as a commercial success. Krasinski guest-starred in a number of television series including Law & Order: Criminal Intent, Without a Trace, Ed, American Dad!, and CSI: Crime Scene Investigation. He also co-starred in films including Kinsey, Duane Hopwood, Jarhead, The Holiday, Shrek the Third, For Your Consideration and Dreamgirls.

In 2008, Krasinski appeared with Renée Zellweger and George Clooney in the latter's directorial venture Leatherheads (2008), a period comedy about the early years of professional American football. He portrayed Carter "the Bullet" Rutherford, Princeton University's college football star and a decorated hero of the First World War. MTV.com praised his acting, describing him as "an actor who's able to project both boyish warmth and intellectual concern" while also stating that he "manages the considerable feat of holding the screen opposite Clooney without melting in the heat of [Clooney's] trademark movie-star mega-wattage."

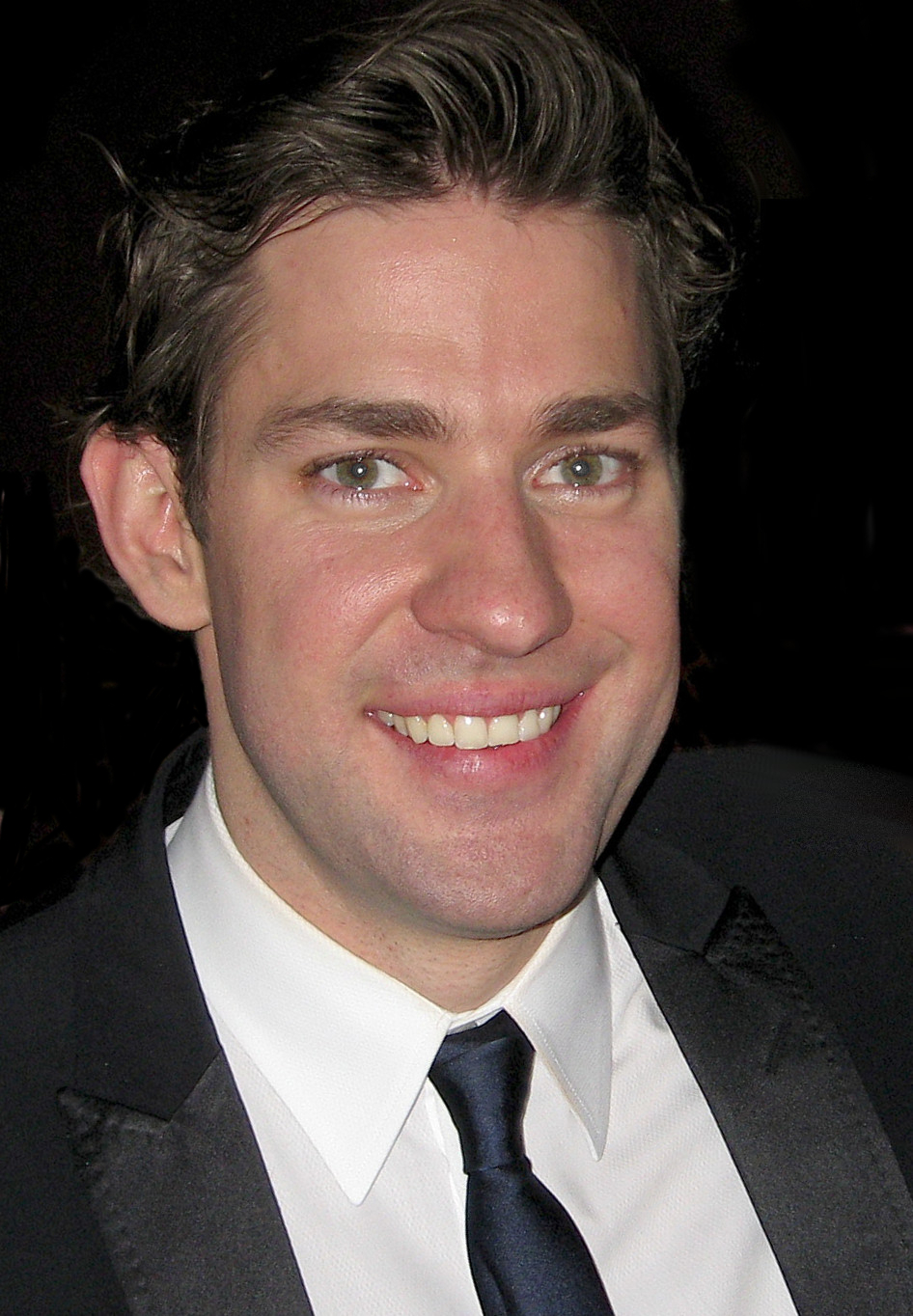
Krasinski in 2009

In 2009, Krasinski made his directorial debut in the comedy-drama film Brief Interviews with Hideous Men. He wrote the screenplay for the film based on David Foster Wallace's collection of short stories, played a minor role in it and also served as producer. The film premiered on January 19, 2009, at the Sundance Film Festival and was nominated for the Grand Jury Prize and received mostly positive reviews. Film critic A.O. Scott wrote that "though this experiment doesn't quite succeed, there's enough intelligence and insight in this movie to make it worth the attempt" while Elizabeth Weitzman from New York Daily News felt that "Krasinski deserves credit for having the ambition to adapt material as difficult as David Foster Wallace's short stories."

The same year, he starred in the comedy-drama Away We Go with Maya Rudolph, directed by Sam Mendes. It follows a couple searching North America for the perfect community in which to settle down and start a family. The film received positive reviews from critics. In his review, Michael Rechtshaffen from The Hollywood Reporter, said "terrific performances make this tender if slight little film worth the trip". His third 2009 role was in Nancy Meyers' romantic comedy It's Complicated as part of an ensemble cast that included Meryl Streep, Steve Martin, Lake Bell and Alec Baldwin. The film was a box office success, grossing over $219 million worldwide. It won the National Board of Review of Motion Pictures Awards for Best Ensemble Cast for the film.

=== 2011–2017: Further feature film, television, and theater work ===
In 2011, Krasinski co-starred with Ginnifer Goodwin, Kate Hudson and Colin Egglesfield in the romantic comedy Something Borrowed, based on Emily Giffin's novel of the same name. Despite the film receiving negative reviews, his performance was widely praised. Krasinski was also one of the top candidates to play the role of Steve Rogers/Captain America in the superhero film Captain America: The First Avenger (2011).

Krasinski starred opposite Drew Barrymore in the biopic film Big Miracle (2012), which covers Operation Breakthrough, the 1988 international effort to rescue gray whales from being trapped in ice near Point Barrow, Alaska. The film saw him play Adam Carlson, a news reporter. The same year, Krasinski starred in Ry Russo-Young's independent drama Nobody Walks with Olivia Thirlby and Rosemarie DeWitt. In the film, Krasinski plays Peter, a sound-designer, husband and father of two who starts developing romantic feelings for a young artist while collaborating on her first art film. His performance was praised by critics. Peter Debruge of Variety wrote: "Krasinski is such an appealing actor that his likability serves to complicate Peter's behavior in interesting ways." Nobody Walks premiered in Competition at the 2012 Sundance Film Festival and won a special Jury Prize.

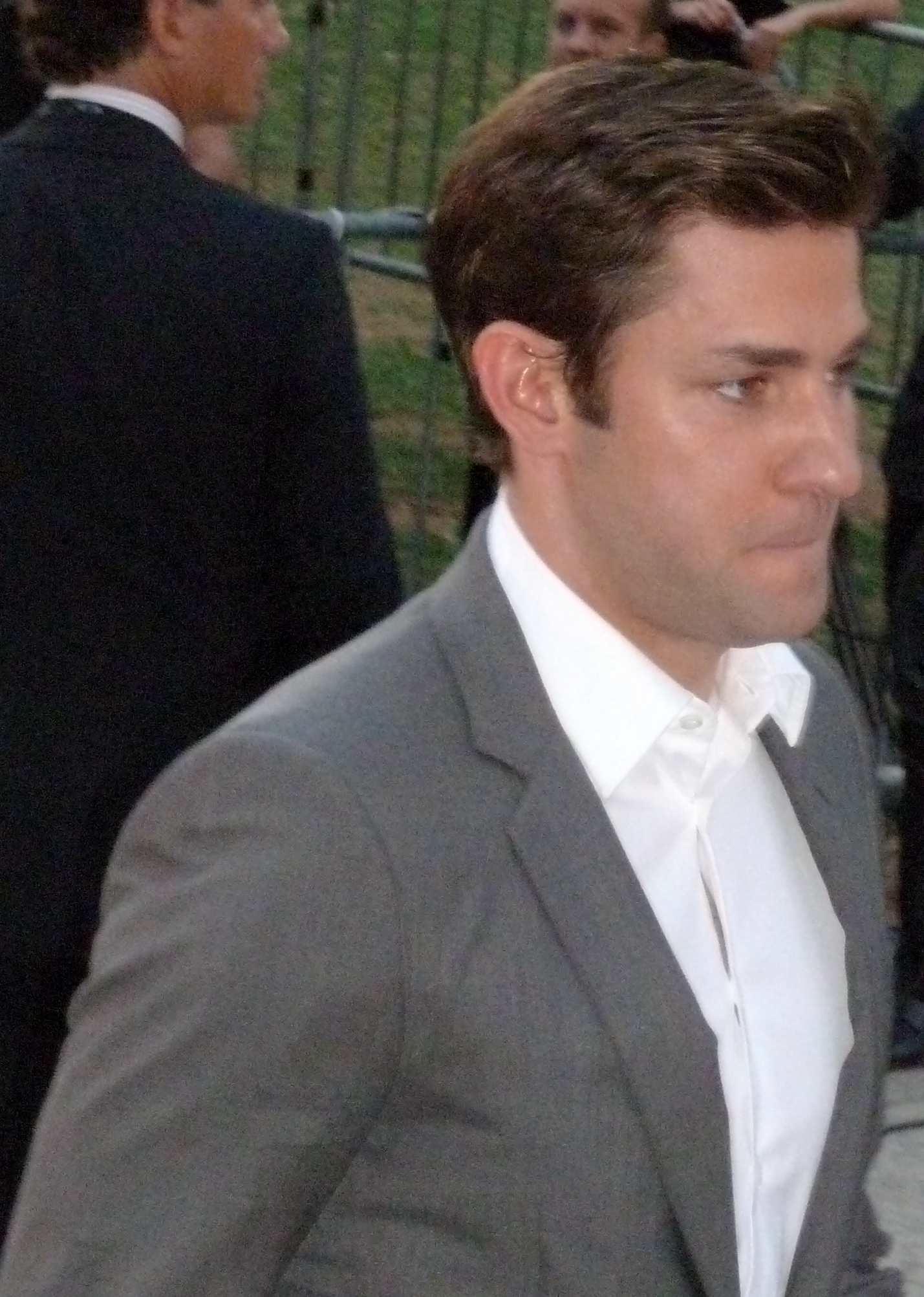
Krasinski at the Toronto Film Festival 2012

Next, Krasinski starred in, co-produced and co-wrote the screenplay for the drama Promised Land with Matt Damon based on a story by Dave Eggers that released on December 28, 2012. Based on a New York Times series by Ian Urbina called Drilling Down, the film follows two corporate salespeople who visit a rural town in an attempt to buy drilling rights from the local residents and was directed by Gus Van Sant. Krasinski came up with the film's premise and developed the idea with Eggers. They later pitched the idea to Damon. It received Special Mention Award at the 63rd Berlin International Film Festival in February 2013. He also narrated the documentary television series Head Games (2012) on the Discovery Channel.

In 2013, Krasinski founded the production company Sunday Night production with Allyson Seeger. The company has an overall deal with Twentieth Century Fox Television. Under the banner, Krasinski and Seeger along with Stephen Merchant, became executive producers of the live-action/animated sitcom Dream Corp, LLC created by Daniel Stessen on Adult Swim. Lost star Jon Gries co-starred. Krasinski along with Merchant are also executive producers of the musical reality competition television series Lip Sync Battle which debuted on the American cable network Spike, on Thursday April 2, 2015. The show is a spin-off of a bit first introduced on Late Night with Jimmy Fallon. Merchant, Krasinski and Krasinski's wife, Emily Blunt, were brainstorming ideas for Krasinski's upcoming appearance on Late Night when the idea took shape. Jimmy Fallon then developed it into a recurring segment on his show. The show proved to be a major success for Spike; its series premiere was the highest-rated non-scripted premiere in Spike's history. In July 2016, the show received a Primetime Emmy Award nomination in the Outstanding Structured Reality Program category.

In 2014, Krasinski collaborated with his Promised Land co-star and co-writer Matt Damon on the critically acclaimed 2016 drama Manchester by the Sea which starred Casey Affleck and Michelle Williams. The film was written and directed by Kenneth Lonergan and is based on an original idea of Krasinski's. The film received six nominations at the 89th Academy Awards including Best Picture. Next, Krasinski co-starred in Cameron Crowe's romantic comedy-drama Aloha with Rachel McAdams, Bradley Cooper and Emma Stone. The film received a negative reaction and controversy from critics and audiences alike.

In 2016, Krasinski starred in Michael Bay's biographical war film 13 Hours: The Secret Soldiers of Benghazi based on Mitchell Zuckoff's 2014 book 13 Hours. The film follows six members of Annex Security Team who fought to defend the American diplomatic compound in Benghazi, Libya after waves of attacks by Islamic militants on September 11, 2012. Krasinski went through extensive physical training for the role to play a former US Navy SEAL. That same year, he directed the comedy-drama The Hollars. The film also marked the first feature film produced under his banner Sunday Night. Krasinski also starred in the film alongside an ensemble cast of Sharlto Copley, Charlie Day, Richard Jenkins, Anna Kendrick and Margo Martindale. The film had its world premiere at the Sundance Film Festival on January 24, 2016. Peter Travers of Rolling Stone wrote that Krasinski "tackles the most clichéd genre in the movie business – the dysfunctional family dramedy" and that "he pulls it off with uncommon humor and compassion."

Krasinski starred in the world premiere of the Off-Broadway play Dry Powder with Hank Azaria, Claire Danes, and Sanjit De Silva which was directed by Thomas Kail. The play ran from March to May 2016 at The Public Theater in New York City which sold out its run before opening. His performance was widely praised by critics and, later that year, he received the Theatre World Award for Outstanding Debut Performance. He also co-starred in the black and white short film Past Forward for Italian luxury fashion house Prada which was directed by David O. Russell and premiered in September 2016 at Milan Fashion Week. In October 2016, he directed a live reading of the Good Will Hunting (1997) screenplay at New York's Skirball Theater in a one-off stage appearance of both the original stars Ben Affleck and Matt Damon along with Emily Blunt.

Krasinski's only release in 2017 was Kathryn Bigelow's Detroit. The film was set during the 1967 Detroit riots and was released in July 2017, around the time of the 50th anniversary of the events, and on the anniversary day of the Algiers Motel incident, which is depicted in the film.

=== 2018–present: A Quiet Place film series and Jack Ryan ===
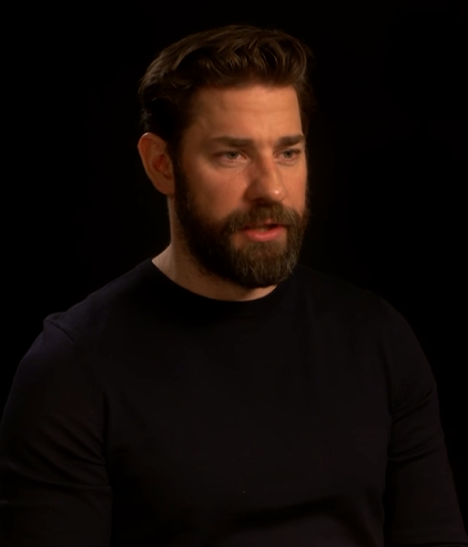
Krasinski in 2018

In 2018, Krasinski directed and co-wrote the film A Quiet Place, a post-apocalyptic horror thriller, in which he also co-starred with his wife Emily Blunt. Released by Paramount Pictures, it scored 96% at Rotten Tomatoes based on 367 reviews, and grossed over $340 million worldwide. The film's success led to Time magazine naming Krasinski one of the 100 most influential people in the world, and the creation of the A Quiet Place film series.

Krasinski produces and stars as the title character in the television series Jack Ryan, making him the fifth actor to portray the character after Alec Baldwin, Harrison Ford, Ben Affleck and Chris Pine from the film series. Jack Ryan premiered on Amazon Video on August 31, 2018. Four months before the series premiere, the series was renewed for a second season, after the critical and commercial success of A Quiet Place.

In March 2020, Krasinski started a web series titled Some Good News (SGN) on YouTube as a response to the ongoing COVID-19 pandemic. The series focused on highlighting good news at the time, while featuring celebrities including Steve Carell, Robert De Niro, the entire original Broadway cast of Hamilton, Brad Pitt, Samuel L. Jackson, Oprah Winfrey, Emma Stone, Ryan Reynolds, Steven Spielberg, Jon Stewart, Malala Yousafzai and the cast of The Office. On April 17, 2020, Krasinski hosted a livestream virtual prom for high schoolers whose proms were cancelled due to the pandemic; 210,000 viewers tuned into the event, which included live performances from Billie Eilish, Finneas, the Jonas Brothers, and DJ D-Nice. Krasinski became ordained as a minister in the Commonwealth of Massachusetts to officiate a virtual wedding as part of the series. The nine-episode series attracted 72 million views and 2.58 million subscribers. On May 22, 2020, ViacomCBS announced they had acquired the show to air on CBS All Access, but Krasinski later confirmed that he and ViacomCBS did not move forward with development plans for the company's streaming platform. Instead, Krasinski would keep Some Good News in its original format on YouTube and secondary video platforms established in the show's original run, such as Snapchat.

On January 20, 2021, Krasinski spoke at President Joe Biden and Vice President Kamala Harris's inauguration celebration via a remote address from his home office. Krasinski hosted his first episode of Saturday Night Live later that month, which was watched by 6.69 million viewers and received positively by critics.

Krasinski directed and wrote the sequel A Quiet Place Part II, in which he also had a supporting role. Initially scheduled for March 20, 2020, it was delayed due to COVID-19 (theatres began to shut down the week of March 16). It was eventually released on May 28, 2021, to positive reviews, becoming a box office success, and the first film of the pandemic era to cross $100 million at the domestic box office. On Rotten Tomatoes, the sequel earned a 91% rating based on 355 reviews, with the website's consensus stating that the "nerve-wracking" film expanded "the terrifying world of the franchise without losing track of its heart".

In May 2021, Krasinski's production company, Sunday Night Productions, signed a first-look deal with Paramount Pictures. In August of the same year, Krasinski had a cameo appearance as a silhouetted gamer in the film Free Guy.

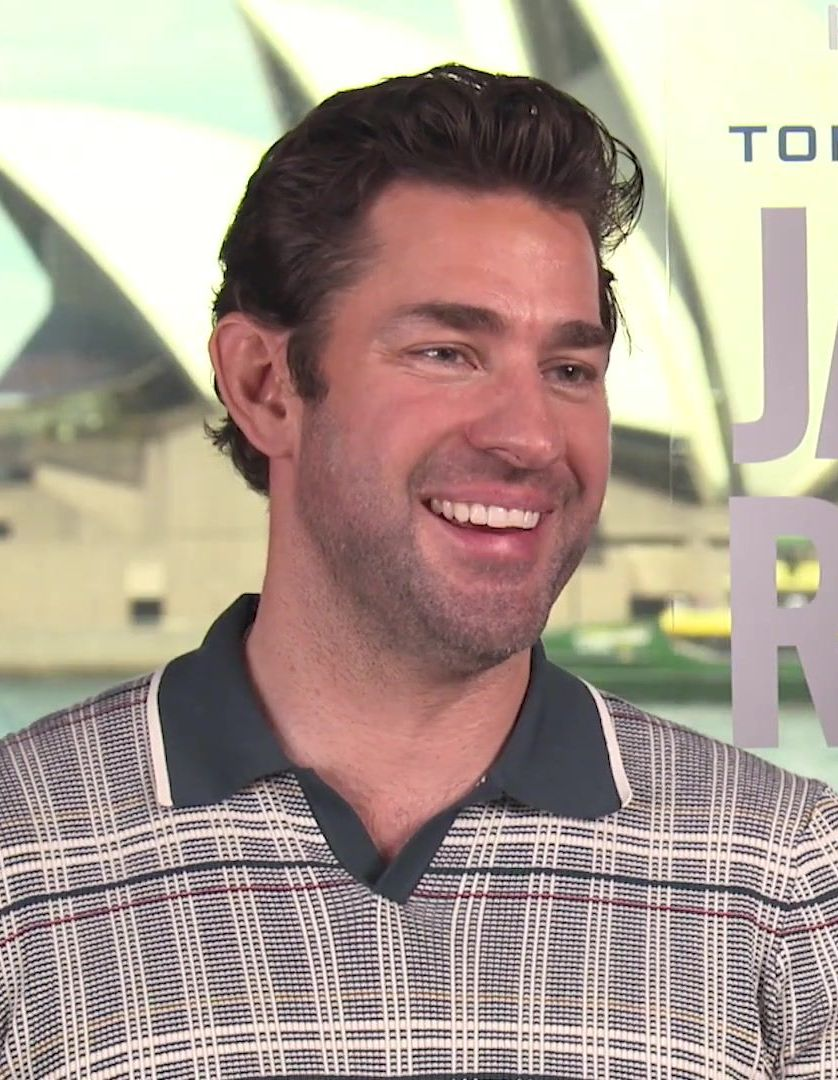
Krasinski in 2022

In May 2022, Krasinski made his Marvel Cinematic Universe debut as Reed Richards / Mister Fantastic in Doctor Strange in the Multiverse of Madness as a member of the Illuminati after many years worth of fan casting, and interest from Krasinski himself.

In June 2022, he voiced Superman in animated film DC League of Super-Pets.

In October 2019, Krasinski's fantasy comedy IF was acquired by Paramount Pictures. Krasinski wrote, directed, produced, and co-starred in the film alongside Ryan Reynolds, who also served as producer. The cast includes Phoebe Waller-Bridge, Fiona Shaw, Louis Gossett Jr., and Krasinski's The Office co-star Steve Carell. The film was released on May 24, 2024.

=== Other work ===
Beginning in March 2006, Krasinski narrated a series of commercials for Ask.com. He has also narrated commercials for Apple TV, Verizon Wireless, Esurance, BlackBerry Storm, My Coke Rewards, and Carnival Cruise Lines, and has appeared in print advertisements for Gap. In 2020, he starred across fellow Bostonians Chris Evans, Rachel Dratch, and David Ortiz in a popular Super Bowl commercial for the 2020 Hyundai Sonata's Smart Park feature, pronouncing it "Smaht Park". He was listed as one of People's Sexiest Men Alive in 2006, 2009, 2018, and 2019, and was the very first man on the list in 2024. He has narrated the children's books Curious George Goes to the Hospital, which was included in the special Curious George collection Curious George: 75th Anniversary Edition, which he also narrated.

In 2024, Krasinski received criticism for appearing in a Canadian televised commercial for Rogers, while the corporation was locking out Canadian union actors amid a labour dispute. His appearance in this commercial was seen as scabbing, and undermining the efforts of the Canadian actors union, ACTRA, to end the lockout.

== Personal life ==
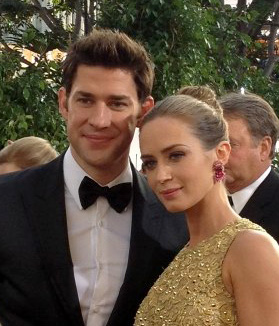
Krasinski with his wife Emily Blunt at the 2013 Golden Globe Awards

Krasinski began dating English actress Emily Blunt in November 2008, became engaged in August 2009, and married her on July 10, 2010, in Como, Italy. They have two daughters. They primarily reside in Brooklyn and previously had a residence in Hollywood Hills, Los Angeles.

Krasinski is a fan of the Boston Red Sox. In 2011, he starred in a New Era/MLB ad campaign with Alec Baldwin, playing off the rivalry between the Red Sox and Baldwin's preferred team, the New York Yankees.

== Philanthropy ==
=== Some Good Merch ===
In May 2020, Krasinski partnered with Sevenly, 5th Element, and the Starbucks Foundation to launch Some Good Merch, an online merchandise store designed to raise financial support for multiple social causes during the COVID-19 pandemic. Store items, including shirts, mugs, tote bags, ornaments, and reusable face masks, featured donated fan art of Krasinski's Some Good News web show, as well as artwork made for the show by Krasinski's daughters. All sales profits went to one of six charities of the buyer's choosing, with The Starbucks Foundation agreeing to match up to one million dollars. Some Good Merch raised nearly $500,000 within one month and over $2 million by 2021. Initial donations were made to World Central Kitchen, the Restaurant Employee Relief Fund, Direct Relief, Trauma Free World, and the Boys & Girls Clubs of America (BGCA). Financial donations from Some Good Merch to Direct Relief, in coordination with a team at the First Nations Fund, were channeled into thousands of COVID-19 PPE, face masks and sanitizer, and other medical relief supplies for the Navajo Nation and White River Indian Hospital in Fort Apache Indian Reservation, a facility serving over 17,000 tribal members and run by the Indian Health Service (IHS). Additional PPE donations were made to SelfHelp Community Services, a home and community-based healthcare service for elderly Holocaust survivors and homebound seniors.

In June 2020, following widespread public protests against racial injustice in the United States, Some Good Merch added donation options for the Black Lives Matter organization and the NAACP Legal Defense and Education Fund, a civil and human rights legal organization dedicated to fighting racial injustice and eliminating structural racial disparities. In October, Some Good Merch donations to the Boys & Girls Clubs of America assisted in the remote re-opening of the Metro Atlanta BGCA and the creation of new distance learning programs after the clubs were forced to close due to the COVID-19 pandemic. At this time, donations to Trauma Free World also went towards the international "Signs for Hope" program, which assists in the training of trauma-informed care for deaf children and orphans. In December 2020, following the release of the ninth episode of Some Good News, Toys for Tots was made available as an additional charitable option on Sevenly, which is an organization that provides toys to children whose families cannot afford to buy them around the Christmas holiday.

=== Fundraising ===
For his 40th birthday in October 2019, Krasinski launched a viral fundraising campaign for Family Reach, a non-profit, Boston-based organization designed to provide financial assistance to families coping with cancer treatment. The campaign raised more than $500,000, with Krasinski and his wife continuing to spearhead fundraising efforts for the organization afterwards via Family Reach's Hope for the Holidays campaign. Partnering with the Omaze foundation in 2018, Krasinski and his wife also raised money for the Malala Fund, which advocates for education rights for girls and women. In 2020, Krasinski and Blunt raised an additional $456,000 for the Family Reach organization.

From March to December 2020, Krasinski and his Sunday Night Productions team created multiple fundraising and donation opportunities through their Some Good News web show. This included providing three months of free cellphone service for all nurses and doctors in the United States through AT&T and lifetime season pass tickets for Boston-based front-line medical workers to Boston Red Sox baseball games. Krasinski's daughters also helped to design a T-shirt with Sevenly and PepsiCo to help raise money for restaurant employees struggling during the COVID-19 pandemic; through SGN, PepsiCo also agreed to donate an additional $3 million to the Restaurant Employee Relief Fund. On the show's ninth episode, a "holiday special" in December 2020, FedEx committed to donating $5 million to Toys for Tots Holiday Drive.

== Acting credits ==
Key
| † | Denotes films that have not yet been released |

=== Film ===
| Year | Title | Role | Notes / Ref. |
|---|---|---|---|
| 2000 | State and Main | Judge's Assistant | Uncredited |
| 2002 | Fighting Still Life | Tyler | Short film |
| 2002 | Alma Mater | Flea Club Candidate 1 | |
| 2004 | Kinsey | Ben | |
| 2004 | Taxi | Messenger No. 3 | |
| 2005 | Duane Hopwood | Bob Flynn | |
| 2005 | Jarhead | Corporal Harrigan | |
| 2006 | Doogal | Additional Voices | American version only |
| 2006 | A New Wave | Gideon | |
| 2006 | For Your Consideration | Paper Badge Officer | |
| 2006 | The Holiday | Ben | |
| 2006 | Dreamgirls | Sam Walsh | |
| 2007 | Smiley Face | Brevin | |
| 2007 | Shrek the Third | Sir Lancelot | Voice Cameo |
| 2007 | License to Wed | Ben Murphy | |
| 2008 | Leatherheads | Carter Rutherford | |
| 2009 | Brief Interviews with Hideous Men | Ryan / Subject No. 20 | |
| 2009 | Monsters vs. Aliens | Cuthbert | Voice cameo |
| 2009 | Away We Go | Burt Farlander | |
| 2009 | It's Complicated | Harley | |
| 2011 | Something Borrowed | Ethan | |
| 2011 | The Muppets | Himself | cameo |
| 2012 | Nobody Walks | Peter | |
| 2012 | Big Miracle | Adam Carlson | |
| 2012 | Promised Land | Dustin Noble | |
| 2013 | Monsters University | "Frightening" Frank McCay | Voice cameo |
| 2013 | The Wind Rises | Honjo | Voice; English dub |
| 2014 | The Prophet | Halim | Voice |
| 2015 | Aloha | John "Woody" Woodside | |
| 2016 | 13 Hours: The Secret Soldiers of Benghazi | Jack Silva | |
| 2016 | The Hollars | John Hollar | |
| 2016 | Past Forward | Man No. 1 | Short film |
| 2017 | Born in China | Narrator | Documentary |
| 2017 | Animal Crackers | Owen Huntington | Voice |
| 2017 | Detroit | Norman Lippitt | |
| 2018 | A Quiet Place | Lee Abbott | |
| 2018 | Next Gen | 7723 | Voice |
| 2020 | A Quiet Place Part II | Lee Abbott | |
| 2021 | Free Guy | Silhouetted Gamer | Voice cameo |
| 2022 | Doctor Strange in the Multiverse of Madness | Reed Richards / Mister Fantastic (Earth-838) | cameo |
| 2022 | DC League of Super-Pets | Kal-El / Clark Kent / Superman | Voice |
| 2024 | IF | Bea's Dad / Marshmallow Man (voice) | Dual role |
| 2025 | Fountain of Youth | Luke Purdue | |
| 2026 | Jack Ryan: Ghost War | Jack Ryan | Also writer and producer |

=== Television ===
| Year | Title | Role | Notes / Ref. |
|---|---|---|---|
| 2003 | Ed | Process server | Episode: "Good Advice" |
| 2004 | Law & Order: Criminal Intent | Jace Gleesing | Episode: "Mad Hops" |
| 2005–2013 | The Office | Jim Halpert | Main role; 201 episodes |
| 2005 | Without a Trace | Curtis Horne | Episode: "The Bogie Man" |
| 2005 | CSI: Crime Scene Investigation | Lyle Davis | Episode: "Who Shot Sherlock" |
| 2006 | American Dad! | Gilbert (voice) | Episode: "Irregarding Steve" |
| 2012 | 30 Rock | Himself | Episode: "The Ballad of Kenneth Parcell" |
| 2012 | Head Games | Narrator | 3 episodes |
| 2013 | Arrested Development | Spyder Foode | Episode: "The B. Team" |
| 2014–2015 | BoJack Horseman | Secretariat (voice) | Episodes "Later" and "The Shot" |
| 2015 | Lip Sync Battle | Himself | Episode: "John Krasinski vs. Anna Kendrick" |
| 2016 | Robot Chicken | Commercial Director / Mike Brady (voices) | Episode: "Secret of the Flushed Footlong" |
| 2018–2023 | Jack Ryan | Jack Ryan | Lead role; 30 episodes |
| 2021 | Saturday Night Live | Himself (host) | Episode: "John Krasinski/Machine Gun Kelly" |

=== Stage ===
| Year | Title | Role | Notes / Ref. |
|---|---|---|---|
| 2016 | Dry Powder | Seth | The Public Theater, Off-Broadway |
| 2025 | Angry Alan | Roger | Off-Broadway |

== Director, producer, and writer credits ==
=== Film ===
| Year | Title | Director | Producer | Writer |
|---|---|---|---|---|
| 2009 | Brief Interviews with Hideous Men | Yes | Yes | Yes |
| 2012 | Promised Land | No | Yes | Yes |
| 2016 | The Hollars | Yes | Yes | No |
| 2018 | A Quiet Place | Yes | Executive | Yes |
| 2020 | A Quiet Place Part II | Yes | Yes | Yes |
| 2024 | IF | Yes | Yes | Yes |
| 2024 | A Quiet Place: Day One | No | Yes | Story |
| 2026 | Jack Ryan: Ghost War | No | Yes | Yes |
| 2027 | A Quiet Place Part III | Yes | Yes | Yes |

Producer only

- Manchester by the Sea (2016, executive)
- Apartment 7A (2024)

=== Television ===
| Year | Title | Director | Producer | Notes / Ref. |
|---|---|---|---|---|
| 2005–2013 | The Office | Yes | Yes | Directed: "Sabre", "Lotto" and "The Boat" |
| 2015–2019 | Lip Sync Battle | No | Executive | Also co-creator |
| 2016–2020 | Dream Corp, LLC | No | Executive | |
| 2018–2023 | Jack Ryan | No | Executive | |
| 2023 | Curses! | No | Executive | |

== Bibliography ==
- Fleming, Mike (April 29, 2010). "Universal Greenlights Whale Tale With John Krasinski And Drew Barrymore". Deadline Hollywood.
- Andreeva, Nellie (June 23, 2011). "HBO Teams With John Krasinski & Aaron Sorkin For Chateau Marmont Miniseries". Deadline Hollywood.
- Fleming, Mike (February 1, 2012). "Focus, Participant Acquire Matt Damon/John Krasinski Film, Gus Van Sant Directing". Deadline Hollywood.
