= The Boat (The Office) =

- The Office episode
- Episode no.: Season 9 Episode 6
- Directed by: John Krasinski
- Written by: Dan Sterling
- Cinematography by: Matt Sohn
- Editing by: Rob Burnett
- Production code: 9007
- Original air date: November 8, 2012
- Running time: 22 minutes

Guest appearances
- Josh Groban as Walter Bernard, Jr.; Jack Coleman as Robert Lipton

Episode chronology
← Previous "Here Comes Treble"	Next → "The Whale"
- The Office (American season 9)

"The Boat" is the sixth episode of the ninth season of the American comedy television series The Office and the 182nd episode overall. The episode originally aired on NBC on November 8, 2012. It guest stars Josh Groban as Andy's brother Walter.

The series depicts the everyday lives of office employees in the Scranton, Pennsylvania branch of the fictional Dunder Mifflin Paper Company. In the episode, Andy Bernard (Ed Helms) must help his family when his dad loses all of their money, Dwight Schrute (Rainn Wilson) is pranked into thinking he is a guest on a radio show, and Kevin Malone (Brian Baumgartner) learns of Oscar Martinez's (Oscar Nunez) affair with Angela Martin's husband.

"The Boat" received positive reviews from television critics. The episode was also viewed by 4.83 million viewers and received a 2.4/6 percent rating among adults between the ages of 18 and 49, ranking third in its time slot, making it the highest-rated episode of the season at the time of its airing. The episode ultimately ranked as the second-highest rated NBC series of the night, after The Voice.

== Synopsis ==
Andy Bernard learns that his father took all the family money and fled to Argentina with his mistress. Left to pick up the pieces, Andy reacts with surprising maturity and sells off family heirlooms, and is upset that he has to sell the family boat for lack of any other means for his mother to support herself. Andy explains that his father never let him sail the boat, even during his adulthood, and doesn't want to sell it before sailing it once. Erin Hannon convinces him that before he sells the boat, they should take it out for one last sunset cruise, and they drive to Stamford, Connecticut, where the boat is docked. Andy starts to hoist the main sail, but is stopped by a broker who is to sail it to the Caribbean for the buyer. With Erin's encouragement, Andy decides to take the boat to the Caribbean himself. He then finds his drunken brother Walter passed out in the liquor closet. Walter tells Andy he wanted to get the first relapse out of the way before checking into rehab. Andy invites him on the trip, saying they both need family time together and leaves, thanking Erin for her encouragement. Erin says to the camera that she would have loved to go with him if he asked. Back in the office that evening, Pete Miller asks Erin to join him for drinks, and she accepts.

A local radio show schedules an interview with Dwight Schrute to discuss Dunder Mifflin, but, unbeknown to Dwight, the interview is later canceled. Jim Halpert suggests they all use this to their advantage, and stage an interview for Dwight's benefit. Dwight believes he is talking to the interviewer through the phone in the break room, but is actually talking to Nellie Bertram who is using an American accent. After tricking him into stripping to his underwear, they trick him into believing that there is a scandal involving Dunder Mifflin paper becoming toxic when exposed to oxygen, and Jim even comes in to warn him that "the stock price is plummeting" because of Dwight's interview. Dwight shifts the blame to CEO David Wallace, and they convince him that David has become disturbed and has taken a mailman hostage. Dwight calls David and tries to talk him into surrendering to the police and letting the mailman go. David is confused but nonetheless responds in a way that leads Dwight to believe he was successful. He emerges from the break room and is greeted by a round of applause from his coworkers. Pleased, Dwight remarks that the interview went "pretty much the way [he] expected".

Kevin Malone overhears Oscar Martinez confessing to the camera that he is having an affair with Angela's husband Robert Lipton. Oscar makes Kevin promise not to reveal anything. During the day, Angela constantly makes unconscious double entendres and foreshadowing, sorely tempting Kevin to let out what he knows. Afraid that Kevin cannot keep his secret, Oscar tries to frame Kevin so that Toby Flenderson will have him fired, but later confesses to Toby that he lied. Later, Robert visits the office, and Oscar acts unnaturally nervous around him. Before Angela's suspicions can be aroused, Kevin interrupts to cheer Robert on about his upcoming election. Oscar says to the camera that he is proud of how Kevin kept the secret, but Kevin then reveals that he momentarily forgot all about the secret, and begins to laugh uncontrollably that Angela's life "is a complete sham."

== Production ==
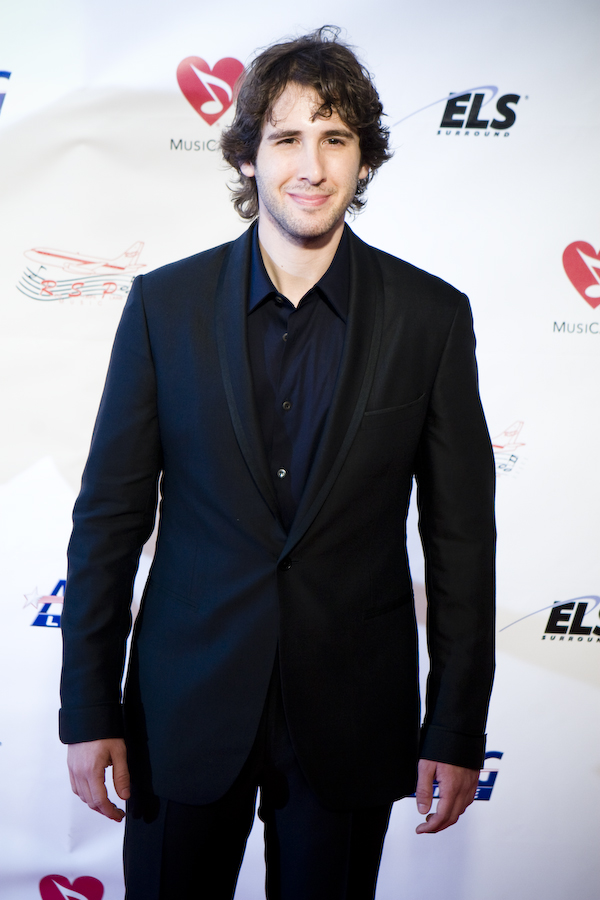
Josh Groban made his second appearance as Andy's younger brother, Walter Bernard, Jr.

"The Boat" was written by executive producer Dan Sterling, his first credit for the series. He was hired before production on the ninth season started as executive producer, to replace Mindy Kaling, who departed full-time involvement on the series following the eighth season. The episode was also directed by series cast member John Krasinski, his third directing credit for the series after the sixth season episode "Sabre" and the eighth-season episode, "Lotto". The episode features the return of Andy's brother, Walter Jr., played by Josh Groban, who is now a drunk. He previously appeared in the eighth season episode, "Garden Party". The episode also guest stars Andy Buckley in voice only. Buckley portrayed David Wallace, the CFO of Dunder Mifflin from seasons two to six. He was recently brought back on board near the end of season eight. Following this episode, Ed Helms was written out of several episodes, in order to film The Hangover Part III.

The official website of The Office included several cut scenes from "The Boat" within a week of the episode's release. In the first 57-second clip, Dwight gets mad when Jim is called a superior salesman and when Nellie claims beet farmers and Battlestar Galactica fans have low IQ levels, during the radio show prank. In the second 53-second clip, Erin goes through several attempts to cheer up Andy. In the third 37-second clip, more scenes from the false hostage situation are seen.

== Cultural references ==
Dwight claims that the radio is using gotcha journalism. In order to cover up for Oscar, Kevin starts chanting "U-S-A!", a popular Olympic chant. When Oscar admits that he lied to Toby, Toby goes on a tangential rant about the Scranton Strangler, a reference to a minor plot development that occurred during the show's sixth and seventh seasons.

== Broadcast and reception ==
=== Ratings ===
"The Boat" was originally scheduled to air on NBC on November 1, 2012, but was replaced with a rerun of The Voice. NBC claimed it was for those affected by Hurricane Sandy, however the schedule change happened nationwide. It eventually aired a week later, on November 8, 2012. In its original broadcast, "The Boat" was viewed by an estimated 4.83 million viewers and received a 2.4 rating/6 percent share among adults between the ages of 18 and 49. This means that it was seen by 2.4 percent of all 18- to 49-year-olds, and 6 percent of all 18- to 49-year-olds watching television at the time of the broadcast. This marked an increase in the ratings from the previous episode, "Here Comes Treble", which had reached a series low in the ratings. The episode tied with the Fox series Glee for third in its timeslot, being beaten by an episode of the ABC series Grey's Anatomy which received a 3.3/8 percent rating and an entry of the CBS drama Person of Interest, which received a 2.9/8 percent rating. The Office was also the second highest-rated NBC television program of the night, after an episode of The Voice.

=== Reviews ===
"The Boat" received mostly positive reviews from television critics. The A.V. Club reviewer Erik Adams called it "another solid late-period episode", praising Rainn Wilson's commitment to Dwight throughout the main plotline. He also complimented the Andy-Erin subplot, and considered it superior to the previous episode for featuring more consistency in Andy's characterization. He also complimented Dan Sterling and John Krasinski's work on the episode, saying that the script made "good on previous hints that Andy and Erin's story won't end like Jim and Pam's" and that Krasinski's direction added "just enough energy not to feel overwhelming". He gave the episode a "B+". IGN writer Cindy White called the episode a "pleasant surprise", for its use of the supporting characters and its development of the season's plotlines. She complimented most of the subplots, and compared Pete and Erin's romance to Jim and Pam's from the early seasons of the series. Her only complaint was Andy's characterization throughout the episode and the ninth season, as a whole, for being "mopey and self-obsessed." Despite this, she gave the episode an 8.0/10, calling it "Great". WhatCulture! reviewer Joseph Kratzer gave the episode four stars out of five, praising the episode for making the previously unsuccessful Oscar-Senator storyline and the Andy's bankrupt family storyline entertaining. He also complimented the fact that Jim and Pam's bickering from the previous episode was not expanded upon, and praised their prank on Dwight, calling it a "great bit" and "an excellent comedic balance to the more serious story of Andy's inner demons."

Michael Tedder of New York called the episode "the single funniest episode of the show since Steve Carell left" and praised Brian Baumgartner's performance for hitting "notes of sweetness, frustration, and emotional confusion that normally get written for the topliners". He also praised the plotlines, writing that "what made this episode so great was that not only did every plot line work ... but every moment positively sang". He gave the episode five stars, concluding that "The Office still has some surprises in it".
