= Dream Corp LLC =

Mixed animated and live-action television series

- Genre: Comedy; Surrealism; Absurd comedy Workplace comedy
- Created by: Daniel Stessen
- Directed by: Daniel Stessen
- Starring: Jon Gries; Nick Rutherford; Ahmed Bharoocha; Mark Proksch; Stephen Merchant; Stephanie Allynne; Megan Ferguson; Sunita Mani
- Composer: Chad VanGaalen
- Country of origin: United States
- Original language: English
- No. of seasons: 3
- No. of episodes: 28

Production
- Executive producers: Daniel Stessen; John Krasinski; Stephen Merchant; Kahlea Baldwin; Allyson Seeger; Mark Costa (Note: Executive Producer for Alive and Kicking, Inc., season 2); Keith Crofford (Note: Executive Producer for Williams Street); Walter Newman
- Producers: Brian Owen; Kahlea Baldwin
- Cinematography: Mårten Tedin
- Animators: BEMO (vfx); Artbelly Productions (rotoscope)
- Editors: Ali Greer; Andrew Fitzgerald; Jordan Kim; Joe Stakun; Daniel Stessen; Chris Poole; Paul Rogers; Kelly Stuyvestant
- Running time: 11-25 minutes
- Production companies: Caviar Content (season 1); Alive and Kicking, Inc. (seasons 2-3); Williams Street; Sunday Night Productions

Original release
- Network: Adult Swim
- Release: October 23, 2016 – November 23, 2020

Dream Corp LLC is an American adult live-action/animated sitcom created by Daniel Stessen for Adult Swim. The series is an absurdist workplace comedy set in a run-down dream therapy facility located in a dilapidated strip mall. In each episode, a new desperate patient has their dreams recorded, analyzed, and, if necessary, adjusted, by Dr. Roberts (Jon Gries) and his staff of misfits.

The series is the first on Adult Swim to use rotoscoping. It premiered on October 23, 2016.

On July 15, 2022, actor Jon Gries confirmed the series was cancelled after three seasons and claimed the show was sold to Hulu. Preliminary discussions about a revival have occurred. Following cost-cutting measures at Adult Swim's parent company, Warner Bros. Discovery, Dream Corp LLC was completely removed from Adult Swim's website, social media accounts, and from digital stores, having been written off for taxes. The series left Hulu in 2024 and is no longer available legally.

== Plot ==
Dream Corp LLC is set in a run-down dream therapy facility located in a derelict strip mall which "operates on the fringes of medical science and legality". Desperate patients – all of them referred to only by number – have their dreams recorded and analyzed by Dr. Roberts and his staff. Roberts uses an unconventional method: he inserts himself into those surreal dreams to guide the patient to overcoming their problem, all while being watched and monitored by his colleagues, including the claw-handed technician Randy; Ahmed, a dope-smoking nurse; the sardonic robot T.E.R.R.Y.; Roberts' female psychology assistant (who changes every season); and a patient, 88, who has been co-opted to work for Roberts as part of his therapy, because he could not pay for it.

== Cast ==
- Jon Gries as Dr. Roberts
- Nick Rutherford as Patient 88
- Ahmed Bharoocha as Ahmed
- Mark Proksch as Randy Blink
- Stephen Merchant as T.E.R.R.Y.
- Stephanie Allynne as Joey (season 1)
- Megan Ferguson as Bea (season 2)
- Sunita Mani as Margot Daly (season 3)

== Production ==
Dream Corp LLC is a black comedy created by Daniel Stessen, known for co-writing and directing The Gold Sparrow, an animated short film released in 2013. Adult Swim commissioned a pilot based on Stessen's original idea for the series in May 2014, ahead of the network's upfront advertising meeting. The pilot featured guest stars Bud Cort, Baron Vaughn, and Moises Arias. The series is produced by Williams Street. Dream Corp LLC was ordered for a full season in November 2015, and the network made mention of the series in their 2016 upfront.

The series is the first on Adult Swim to use rotoscoping to achieve animation; this technique entails drawing over live-action footage. This process was used for Stessen's short film The Gold Sparrow and the pilot for Dream Corp LLC. Reclusive animator and songwriter Chad VanGaalen was brought on board to provide musical score for the show and also designed "T.E.R.R.Y." the office robot. The trailer for the series was released on October 5, 2016.

The series' animated segments are handled by two companies. BEMO provides the visual effects and CG graphics, while Artbelly Productions provides the rotoscoped character animation using their proprietary rotoscoping software, Rotobelly. The live action portions of the show were produced by Caviar Content in season one, with Alive and Kicking, Inc. taking over live action shoots in season two.

Season 2 premiered on October 21, 2018.

A "sneak preview" of season 3 premiered as part of Adult Swim's annual April Fool's programming stunt. It was expected to premiere in summer 2020, but a late June 2020 launch date was pushed back. On October 12, 2020, it was announced that the third season would premiere on October 25, 2020.

On July 15, 2022, actor Jon Gries confirmed the series was cancelled after three seasons.

== Style ==
The visual style of Dream Corp LLC has been described as "the degraded, retro-futurist look of Terry Gilliam’s Brazil and the underrated The Zero Theorem, while the sci-fi exists in the realm of lo-fi realism like Charlie Kaufman and Michel Gondry’s Eternal Sunshine of the Spotless Mind." The original Artbelly rotoscopers worked on the films Waking Life (2001) and A Scanner Darkly (2006), the look of which also contributes to the show's aesthetic.

== Episodes ==
Season	Episodes	Originally released	
Season	Episodes	First released	Last released
1	6	October 23, 2016	November 27, 2016
2	14	October 21, 2018	December 2, 2018
3	8	March 31, 2020	November 22, 2020

=== Season 1 (2016) ===
No. overall	No. in season	Title	Directed by	Written by	Original release date	Prod. code	U.S. viewers (millions)
1	1	"Pilot"	Daniel Stessen	Daniel Stessen	October 23, 2016	101	0.85
Patient 88 visits Dream Corp to cure his romantic problems under the supervision of Dr. Roberts and his questionable staff. 88's card gets declined. Dave Coulier guest stars
2	2	"The Smoking Nun"	Daniel Stessen	Nick Rutherford	October 30, 2016	102	0.93
Patient 54 (June Squibb) is an elderly client who is trying to quit smoking. She leaves Dream Corp a new woman. 88 gets stabbed in the neck.
3	3	"The Predator"	Daniel Stessen	Christopher Roe	November 6, 2016	103	1.01
Patients 86 and 103 (Geoffrey Arend and Dan Gill) confront their biggest fears and relationship phobias with help from The Predator. Randy loses a limb.
4	4	"Tijuana Zebra"	Daniel Stessen	Daniel Stessen	November 13, 2016	104	0.80
T.E.R.R.Y. the robot turns 21 and feels outdated. The staff joins forces, alongside T.E.R.R.Y’s mom (Stephnie Weir), to cure T.E.R.R.Y.'s depression and help him find the meaning of life.
5	5	"You Down with OCD?"	Daniel Stessen	Daniel Stessen	November 20, 2016	105	0.93
Patient 46 (Mary Lynn Rajskub) suffers from severe OCD and is a rare case even for Dr. Roberts. The staff gears up to find her when she suddenly goes missing. T.E.R.R.Y. and 88 compete for her affection.
6	6	"The Leak"	Daniel Stessen	Daniel Stessen	November 27, 2016	106	0.83
Disaster strikes at Dream Corp LLC when a leak causes the staff to evacuate during routine dream maintenance. Joey sheds her innocent self after being left behind in the dream world by Dr. Roberts, adopting a demonic form (Liam Neeson). Meanwhile, Patient 13 (Cleo King), a military official, intrudes.

=== Season 2 (2018) ===
No. overall	No. in season	Title	Directed by	Written by	Original release date	Prod. code	U.S. viewers (millions)
7	1	"Deep Impact"	Daniel Stessen	Daniel Stessen	October 21, 2018	201	0.55
Patient 21 (Jimmi Simpson) is afraid to fall asleep. After a parasomnia episode injures the new intern Bea, Dr. Roberts drops in to the patients dreams to guide him through the wake of his fears.
8	2	"The Bullied"	Daniel Stessen	Christopher Roe	October 21, 2018	202	0.48
Patient 74 (Eugene Cordero) visits Dream Corp LLC for his debilitating fear of confined spaces. T.E.R.R.Y. discovers the internet.
9	3	"Accordion Jim"	Daniel Stessen	Nick Rutherford	October 28, 2018	203	0.55
Patient 13 (Cleo King) returns for Dream Therapy after cancelling her last four appointments. Dr Roberts cautiously agrees to treat her. 88 survives a dog attack.
10	4	"Amnesia"	Daniel Stessen	Mark Proksch	October 28, 2018	204	0.52
Patient 62 (Rupert Friend) catches amnesia during a routine arachnophobia treatment. Dr Roberts attempts to cure him by hand using fundamentals. Randy gets catfished.
11	5	"Woomba"	Daniel Stessen	Christopher Roe	November 4, 2018	205	0.60
A very pregnant Patient 6 (Natalie Morales) visits Dream Corp LLC desperate to be cured of her strange addiction to eating couch cushions (Pica (disorder)). Randy makes a cyst popping video but his cyst contains a surprise.
12	6	"Wild Bill"	Daniel Stessen	Nick Rutherford	November 4, 2018	206	0.50
Roberts' old roommate, Bill Ruff (Darrell Hammond), pays a visit to Dream Corp LLC under the guise of selling bad office artwork. Everyone in the staff is charmed, except for 88, who makes it his mission to expose Bill's real intentions. This episode references the films Short Circuit 2, Falling Down, and The Goonies, as well as an episode of the tv sitcom Friends.
13	7	"Guys and Dads"	Daniel Stessen	Christopher Roe	November 11, 2018	207	0.66
A dejected Mr. Simzer (Craig Robinson) brings his teenage son to Dream Corp LLC for treatment. The staff realizes his son isn't the only one who needs Dream Therapy. Randy loves Mama's Meat Pops.
14	8	"88's Weekly"	Daniel Stessen	Dugan O'Neal	November 11, 2018	208	0.60
88 goes under to get treatment for his "confidence". Dr Roberts tests a groundbreaking new technology.
15	9	"Staff Infection"	Daniel Stessen	Daniel Stessen	November 18, 2018	209	0.63
Patient 30 (Mo Collins) visits Dream Corp LLC for treatment of a long list of "symptoms." A chemical spill in the Lab puts the facility on lock down. A new side of Ahmed is revealed while 88 is put in grave danger.
16	10	"Pickle Trip"	Daniel Stessen	Nick Rutherford, Daniel Stessen	November 18, 2018	210	0.53
88 eats Ahmed's pickle without knowing that the pickle has been dosed with numerous psychedelic and psycho-active drugs.
17	11	"Dust Bunnies"	Daniel Stessen	Dugan O'Neal	November 25, 2018	211	0.63
Patient 75 (Iqbal Theba) comes to Dream Corp LLC to help clean up his life and regain the respect of his children. T.E.R.R.Y. introduces the staff to his new friend Leonard.
18	12	"Can't Touch This"	Daniel Stessen	Nick Rutherford	November 25, 2018	212	0.60
Skin to skin contact feels like fire to Patient 66 (Allyn Rachel). With a history of minimal human touch or relationships, Dr Roberts prescribes her a Dream Date.
19	13	"What Happens in Randy, Stays in Randy"	Daniel Stessen	Nick Rutherford	December 2, 2018	213	0.69
Dr Roberts wrangles Randy for his biannual session to address his agoraphobia. T.E.R.R.Y. struggles with his conscience.
20	14	"The Krux"	Daniel Stessen	Daniel Stessen	December 2, 2018	214	0.56
Patient 101 (Toby Kebbell), a serial killer nicknamed The Krux, is wheeled into Dream Corp LLC as part of a court-ordered, time-limited evaluation. Dr. Roberts struggles to navigate Patient 101's subconscious and calls on the entire staff to help contain their most challenging patient to date.

=== Season 3 (2020) ===
No. overall	No. in season	Title	Directed by	Written by	Original release date	Prod. code	U.S. viewers (millions)
21	1	"Comin' in Hot"	Daniel Stessen	Nicholas Rutherford, Daniel Stessen	October 26, 2020	301	0.19
22	2	"Monkey Man"	Daniel Stessen	Christopher Roe, Daniel Stessen	November 2, 2020	302	0.25
23	3	"Tricky Ricky"	Daniel Stessen	Mark Proksch, Daniel Stessen	November 2, 2020 (Note: This episode had an advanced stealth premiere on April 1, 2020 as part of Adult Swim’s annual April Fools' stunt.)	303	0.40
24	4	"Fear of Heights"	Daniel Stessen	Dugan O'Neal, Daniel Stessen	November 9, 2020	304	0.36
25	5	"Virgil Bottoms"	Daniel Stessen	Nicholas Rutherford, Daniel Stessen	November 9, 2020	305	0.32
26	6	"Where Are They Now?"	Daniel Stessen	Daniel Stessen, Charles Yu	November 16, 2020	306	0.23
27	7	"Clone Disposal"	Daniel Stessen	Nicholas Rutherford, Daniel Stessen	November 16, 2020	307	0.23
28	8	"Randay"	Daniel Stessen	Daniel Stessen, Charles Yu	November 23, 2020	308	0.29
