= Some Good News =

2020 American web series

- Genre: Talk show; News
- Created by: John Krasinski
- Presented by: John Krasinski
- Country of origin: United States
- Original language: English
- No. of seasons: 1
- No. of episodes: 9

Production
- Running time: 15–25 minutes
- Production company: Sunday Night Productions

Original release
- Network: YouTube
- Release: March 29 – December 20, 2020

Some Good News is a 2020 American web series created and hosted by American actor and filmmaker John Krasinski on YouTube, which premiered on March 29, 2020. Krasinski self-funded and co-produced the show with his production company, Sunday Night Productions, and filmed each episode remotely from his home in Brooklyn during the COVID-19 pandemic. After eight episodes and a live-streamed prom, a report from the Hollywood Reporter announced that the show was sold to ViacomCBS on 22 May 2020. Krasinski later confirmed that he dropped plans for any adaptations to the show and that it would be kept in its original format. Krasinski brought the show back for a holiday special on YouTube in December 2020.

Since the first season concluded, Some Good News have raised over $2 million for various charities through their Some Good Merch Sevenly store. Donations have gone to Direct Relief, Boys & Girls Clubs of America, Trauma Free World, World Central Kitchen, the NAACP Legal Defense and Education Fund, Toys For Tots, and the Restaurant Employee Relief Fund.

== Premise ==
The show, which was originally developed and hosted on YouTube, is "a news show dedicated entirely to good news," with Krasinski operating inside his home during the COVID-19 pandemic. In each episode, he discusses several feel-good stories and invites celebrity guests to join in conversation.

== Cast ==
=== Host ===
- John Krasinski

=== Guests ===
- Steve Carell
- Emily Blunt
- Robert De Niro
- Lin-Manuel Miranda and the original Broadway cast of Hamilton
- David Ortiz
- Brad Pitt
- Rainn Wilson
- Chance The Rapper
- The Jonas Brothers
- Billie Eilish and Finneas O'Connell
- NASA astronauts Jessica Meir, Chris Cassidy, and Andrew R. Morgan
- Martha Stewart
- David Chang
- Guy Fieri
- Stanley Tucci
- Ryan Reynolds
- Samuel L. Jackson
- Oprah Winfrey
- Malala Yousafzai
- Steven Spielberg
- Jon Stewart
- Emma Stone
- Zac Brown
- The cast of The Office: Jenna Fischer, Rainn Wilson, Ed Helms, Ellie Kemper, Mindy Kaling, B. J. Novak, Angela Kinsey, Oscar Nunez, Phyllis Smith, Brian Baumgartner, Kate Flannery, Creed Bratton
- Justin Timberlake
- George Clooney
- Dwayne Johnson

== Production ==
Krasinski conceptualized Some Good News in 2013, but launched the series in 2020, amid the imposed lockdown during the COVID-19 pandemic. He self-financed and produced the program, in conjunction with his production banner partner, Allyson Seeger. Various companies were hired for production, editing, marketing, and other aspects.

On 21 May 2020, ViacomCBS announced that it had acquired Some Good News, following a bidding war, with the intention of turning the show into a weekly addition to traditional news segments for CBS All Access and Comedy Central with productions through Comedy Central Productions. Krasinski stated he would step down as host, but remain an executive producer alongside Sunday Night Productions. However, in May 2021, Krasinski announced he and ViacomCBS did not move forward with development plans for the company's streaming platform. Instead, Some Good News would remain in its original format on YouTube as well as secondary video platforms established in the show's original run such as Snapchat.

== Episodes ==
Episodes of Some Good News
| No. | Title | Original release date |
|---|---|---|
| 1 | "Some Good News with John Krasinski" | March 29, 2020 |
Krasinski opened the show by stating, "We are all going through an incredibly trying time, but, through all the anxiety, through all the confusion, all the isolation, and all the Tiger King, somehow the human spirit found a way to break through and blow us all away." Krasinski's former costar on The Office Steve Carell appeared on the show as an "entertainment correspondent." Krasinski also interviewed a 15-year-old cancer survivor named Courtney "Coco" Johnson.
| 2 | "Zoom Surprise" | April 5, 2020 |
The episode featured a new introduction, which was created by a viewer. In the episode, Krasinski had multiple guest stars, including his wife actress Emily Blunt, actor Robert De Niro, composer Lin-Manuel Miranda, and the cast of the musical Hamilton (including original performers Leslie Odom Jr., Anthony Ramos and Renée Elise Goldsberry). He also interviewed a nine-year-old girl named Aubrey who was a "superfan" of Hamilton but was unable to see the show due to the coronavirus. He stated he would fly Aubrey out to the show once the coronavirus was over, but in the meantime arranged for the cast to perform for her from their homes via Zoom. Ad Age called the episode "ridiculously wonderful."
| 3 | "Baseball Is Back" | April 13, 2020 |
Krasinski and special guest star baseball player David Ortiz treated five different healthcare workers from Beth Israel Deaconess Medical Center in Boston with a trip to Fenway Park where they were given lifetime season pass tickets to the Boston Red Sox. Additionally, Krasinski announced that he had coordinated with AT&T to provide free cellphone service for three months for all nurses and doctors in the country.
| 4 | "Prom 2020" | April 20, 2020 |
The episode featured guests Chance The Rapper, Brad Pitt, Rainn Wilson, the Jonas Brothers, Billie Eilish and her brother Finneas O'Connell. Additionally, NASA astronauts Jessica Meir, Chris Cassidy, and Andrew R. Morgan were featured while aboard the International Space Station. Pitt provided a weather forecast, and towards the end of the episode, Krasinski, with support from a few of his special guests, recapped the "virtual prom" he hosted live the previous Friday, for teens who were unable to attend their prom due to the pandemic.
| 5 | "SGN Potluck" | April 26, 2020 |
The episode featured guests Martha Stewart, David Chang, Guy Fieri and Stanley Tucci. Each guest prepared a family recipe sent in by fans. Krasinski announced that PepsiCo was donating an additional 3 million dollars to Fieri's charity, the Restaurant Employee Relief Fund, to help out restaurant workers.
| 6 | "Graduation 2020" | May 3, 2020 |
The episode featured guests Ryan Reynolds, Samuel L. Jackson, Oprah Winfrey, Malala Yousafzai, Steven Spielberg and Jon Stewart. The episode focused on a virtual graduation, since most high schools, colleges, and universities in the United States and around parts the world did not hold graduation ceremonies because of the coronavirus. Krasinski invited new graduates onto the show, who asked questions of the celebrity guests. In what CNet called "one of the best new segments", Jackson went up to people on the street and shouted compliments at them. Winfrey gave advice to poet Amanda Gorman, the first youth poet laureate, while Reynolds played weatherman.
| 7 | "The Office Cast Reunites for Zoom Wedding" | May 11, 2020 |
The episode begins with Emily Blunt momentarily making an appearance as the host of the show before Krasinski feigns outrage and takes over. Emma Stone delivers the weather report. Krasinski then shares a story of a Maryland couple who proposed in the same way Jim Halpert and Pam Beesley did on The Office. He then introduces them on the show as "love conquers all correspondents". He invites their family on Zoom, where Krasinski announces he is an ordained minister and proceeds to marry them with the help of Zac Brown who plays a song for them. The cast of The Office reenacts Jim and Pam's wedding dance. The cast reprising their roles include Jenna Fischer, Steve Carell, Rainn Wilson, Ed Helms, Ellie Kemper, Mindy Kaling, B. J. Novak, Angela Kinsey, Oscar Nunez, Phyllis Smith, Brian Baumgartner, Kate Flannery, and Creed Bratton.
| 8 | "The SGN Community Episode!" | May 17, 2020 |
| 9 | "Holiday Special with Dwayne Johnson" | December 20, 2020 |

=== Live virtual prom special ===
On 16 April 2020, Krasinski announced that he was DJing a live-streamed prom special on the channel the following night at 8:00 pm EDT. The Jonas Brothers performed their song "Sucker" while Eilish and O'Connell performed "Bad Guy". Krasinski stated, "We are all going through this together. It's a very weird time, but each and every one of you are missing something and this is the least I could do and I couldn't be more proud to do it." Mashable called the episode "truly a night to remember." Vulture stated "Overall, [it was] at least as fun as our actual physical prom, minus the $$$. Hope you enjoyed, Class of 2020!"

Around 86,500 people were watching initially, but there were over 214,000 viewers by the end.

== Reception ==
=== Audience viewership ===
Some Good News debuted on YouTube on March 29, 2020, and accumulated 330,000 subscribers overnight. The first episode appeared on YouTube's Trending page and was viewed 3.1 million times one day after being uploaded. It had been viewed over 12 million times by April 5, 2020.

Within the first eight weeks, the eight episode series drew in over 72 million views and 2.58 million subscribers.

=== Critical response ===
Some Good News was positively received, including the accompanying Twitter account Krasinski set up for the show under the handle @somegoodnews. TV Insider wrote "... Some Good News has proven how powerful spreading positivity can be. TV fans should put their faith in John Krasinski to deliver what the title of his YouTube series promises amidst the chaos and hardships of life during the COVID-19 pandemic."

Reviewing the second episode, CBN News stated, "just like the first episode, this one is definitely worth watching." NPR stated the episode was an "explosion of good-hearted joy". Michelle Obama shared the video on social media, adding, "I couldn't help but smile after watching this video with John Krasinski, Lin-Manuel Miranda, and the cast of Hamilton surprising a young fan, giving us all a little bit of joy at this difficult time." Jimmy Traina of Sports Illustrated said the third episode "managed to create some damn good sports content—and some tears."

=== Accolades ===
Some Good News won a Special Achievement Award at the 2020 Webby Awards and was nominated for a Streamy Award.

== Some Good Merch ==
In episode eight, John Krasinski announced that Some Good News had partnered with Sevenly and the Starbucks Foundation to launch Some Good Merch, an online merchandise store where 100% of profits go to charity. As of 2021, over two million dollars have been donated to six charities through Some Good Merch. Donations from Some Good Merch to Direct Relief specifically provided emergency aid to the Navajo Nation and White River Indian Hospital in Fort Apache Indian Reservation, a facility serving over 17,000 tribal members and run by the Indian Health Service (IHS). The donation included COVID-19 PPE, thousands of masks and sanitizer, and other relief supplies compiled by a coordinating team at First Nations Fund. Additionally, PPE donations were made to SelfHelp Community Services, a home and community-based healthcare service for elderly Holocaust survivors and homebound seniors. With Trauma Free World, Some Good Merch donations went towards the international "Signs for Hope" program, which assists in the training of trauma-informed care for deaf children and orphans. Additionally, donations to the Boys & Girls Clubs of America assisted in the remote re-opening of the Metro Atlanta BGCA after the club was forced to close due to the COVID-19 Pandemic. Donations have also been made to the World Central Kitchen, Toys for Tots, NAACP Legal Defense and Education Fund, and the Restaurant Employee Relief Fund.
