= Brief Interviews with Hideous Men (film) =

2009 film by John Krasinski

- Theatrical release poster
- Directed by: John Krasinski
- Screenplay by: John Krasinski
- Based on: Brief Interviews with Hideous Men by David Foster Wallace
- Produced by: John Krasinski; Kevin Patrick Connors; Thomas Fatone; Chris Hayes
- Starring: Will Arnett; Bobby Cannavale; Josh Charles; Dominic Cooper; Frankie Faison; Will Forte; Timothy Hutton; John Krasinski; Christopher Meloni; Chris Messina; Max Minghella; Clarke Peters; Lou Taylor Pucci; Ben Shenkman; Julianne Nicholson
- Cinematography: John Bailey
- Edited by: Zene Baker; Rich Fox
- Music by: Billy Mohler; Nate Wood
- Production company: Sunday Night Productions
- Distributed by: IFC Films
- Release date: January 19, 2009 (Sundance)
- Running time: 80 minutes
- Country: United States
- Language: English
- Box office: $27,935

Brief Interviews with Hideous Men is a 2009 American comedy-drama film written, produced, and directed by John Krasinski, in his directorial debut. The film is based on short stories from the collection of the same name by David Foster Wallace.

== Plot ==
Sara Quinn copes with a recent breakup by interviewing men as part of her graduate studies. Her intellectual endeavor has emotional consequences as the men’s twisted and revealing stories are juxtaposed against the backdrop of her own experience. As she begins to listen closely to the men around her, Sara must ultimately reconcile herself to the darkness that lies below the surface of human interactions.

== Cast ==
- Julianne Nicholson as Sara Quinn
- Josh Charles as Subject #2
- Christopher Meloni as R / Subject #3
- Will Arnett as Subject #11
- Ben Shenkman as Subject #14
- Michael Cerveris as Subject #15
- Chris Messina as Subject #19
- John Krasinski as Ryan / Subject #20
- Ben Gibbard as Harry / Subject #20
- Lou Taylor Pucci as Evan / Subject #28
- Max Minghella as Kevin / Subject #28
- Timothy Hutton as Prof. Adams / Subject #30
- Clarke Peters as Subject #31
- Bobby Cannavale as Subject #40
- Frankie Faison as Subject #42
- Dominic Cooper as Daniel / Subject #46
- Corey Stoll as Subject #51
- Joey Slotnick as Tad / Subject #59
- Will Forte as Subject #72
- Rashida Jones as Hannah

== Production ==
The film was shot in studios in Brooklyn, New York and exterior filming took place in Staten Island, New York, and on the campuses of Columbia University and Brooklyn College.

== Reception ==
On review aggregator Rotten Tomatoes, the film holds an approval rating of 40% based on 40 reviews, with an average rating of 5.0/10. The website's critics consensus reads, "Ambitious but uneven, John Krasinski's adaptation of David Foster Wallace's Brief Interviews with Hideous Men tries hard but doesn't match the depth of the book." On Metacritic, the film has a weighted average score of 44 out of 100, based on 16 critics, indicating "mixed or average" reviews. The film was selected for the US Dramatic Competition in the 2009 Sundance Film Festival.
