= Curses! (TV series) =

American streaming television series

- Promotional poster
- Genre: Action-adventure; Comedy horror Supernatural fiction
- Created by: Jim Cooper; Jeff Dixon
- Voices of: Gabrielle Nevaeh Green; Andre Robinson; Lyric Lewis; Reid Scott; Rhys Darby; James Marsters
- Composer: Jesi Oklee Nelson
- Country of origin: United States
- Original language: English
- No. of seasons: 2
- No. of episodes: 20

Production
- Executive producers: Jim Cooper; Jeff Dixon; John Krasinski
- Producer: Leo Riley
- Running time: 23 minutes
- Production companies: DreamWorks Animation Television; Sunday Night Productions

Original release
- Network: Apple TV+
- Release: October 27, 2023 – October 4, 2024

Curses! is an American animated supernatural horror-comedy television series produced by DreamWorks Animation Television for Apple TV+. A second season was released on October 4, 2024.

== Premise ==
When a family curse turned Alex Vanderhouven to stone, it's up to his two kids and his wife to return all the artifacts stolen by their ancestors to their rightful homes to undo the curse for good.

The show follows Pandora, Russ and Sky Vanderhouven, a family cursed by their ancestors' pillaging of ancient artifacts from across the globe in which the father, Alex, was turned to stone. After reversing the curse on an adventure of a lifetime, the second season picks up with Alex rejoining the family as they continue working to undo the damage done by their greedy ancestors. But when something about Alex doesn't seem quite right, the family must band together to solve the mysteries that confront them, both on the road and within the walls of Briarstone Manor.

== Cast and characters ==
- Gabrielle Nevaeh Green as Pandora Vanderhouven
- Andre Robinson as Horus "Russ" Vanderhouven
- Lyric Lewis as Sky Vanderhouven
- Reid Scott as Alex Vanderhouven
- James Marsters as Larry
- Rhys Darby as Stanley
- Rhea Perlman as Margie
- Robert Englund as Cornelius Vanderhouven
- Phylicia Rashad as Georgia
- Kay Bess as Maeve
- Frankie McNellis as Devi Cuadra
- Earl Baylon as Caparaz
- Dusan Brown as Tyler
- Keith Ferguson as Franklin
- Michael Benyaer as Manticore
- Kinza Khan as Muskaan

== Episodes ==
=== Series overview ===
Series overview
| Season | Episodes | Originally released |
|---|---|---|
| 1 | 10 | October 27, 2023 |
| 2 | 10 | October 4, 2024 |

=== Season 1 (2023) ===
| No. overall | No. in season | Title | Directed by | Written by | Original release date |
|---|---|---|---|---|---|
| 1 | 1 | "The Restricted Wing" | Leo Riley | Jim Cooper & Jeff Dixon | October 27, 2023 |
When Alex doesn't return from a family game of hide-and-seek, secrets are revealed about the Vanderhouvens' past, present and future.
| 2 | 2 | "The Golden Baboon Head" | Daniel Lafrance | Jim Cooper & Jeff Dixon | October 27, 2023 |
Pandora, Russ and Sky befriend two unlikely allies while racing against time to capture a creature on the loose in the manor.
| 3 | 3 | "The Baboon Temple" | Leo Riley | Jim Cooper & Jeff Dixon | October 27, 2023 |
The Vanderhouvens leave home to search for answers about a cursed artifact from the Congo. But upon arrival, they face unexpected mayhem.
| 4 | 4 | "The Olmec Babies" | Daniel Lafrance | Jim Cooper & Jeff Dixon | October 27, 2023 |
When three fertility statues come to life, it's up to Russ, Pandora and Sky to reunite them with their "mother" on display at the Paxton Museum.
| 5 | 5 | "The Scryer Bowl" | Daniel Lafrance | Khaila Amazan | October 27, 2023 |
The Vanderhouvens discover a possible way to contact Alex. But chaos ensues-and Stanley gets caught in the center of it.
| 6 | 6 | "The Japanese Painting" | Daniel Lafrance | Dimitry Pompée | October 27, 2023 |
Russ, Sky, Stanley and Larry navigate a new crisis after Pandora is sucked into a work of art and surrounded by sinister spirits.
| 7 | 7 | "The Celtic Cloak" | George Gipson | Ami Boghani | October 27, 2023 |
The Vanderhouvens travel to a stormy Scottish island and cross paths with a puzzling local. Larry and Stanley put their map-making skills to the test.
| 8 | 8 | "The Memory Box" | Daniel Lafrance | Jim Cooper & Jeff Dixon | October 27, 2023 |
In order to get closer to saving Alex, the family must dig into the memories of Cornelius Vanderhouven.
| 9 | 9 | "The Aztec Necklace" | Daniel Lafrance | Ami Boghani | October 27, 2023 |
Pandora, Russ and Sky head to the jungles of the Yucatan in search of a powerful witch believed to be in possession of a protective amulet.
| 10 | 10 | "The Ruby Hourglass & the Obsidian Sphere" | George Gipson | Dimitry Pompée | October 27, 2023 |
A major challenge pushes the Vanderhouvens to their limits. Can they overcome the impossible and finally bring Alex back?

=== Season 2 (2024) ===
| No. overall | No. in season | Title | Directed by | Written by | Original release date |
|---|---|---|---|---|---|
| 11 | 1 | "The Lantern" | Daniel Lafrance | Jim Cooper & Jeff Dixon | October 4, 2024 |
| 12 | 2 | "The Persian Die Block" | Daniel Lafrance | Ami Boghani & Dimitry Pompée | October 4, 2024 |
| 13 | 3 | "The Ottoman Ship Helm" | George Gipson | Dimitry Pompée | October 4, 2024 |
| 14 | 4 | "The Rajasthani Puppet" | Daniel Lafrance | Ami Boghani | October 4, 2024 |
| 15 | 5 | "The Inuit Glasses and the Peruvian Gourd" | Daniel Lafrance | Ami Boghani | October 4, 2024 |
| 16 | 6 | "The Goodluck Bridle" | George Gipson | Dimitry Pompée | October 4, 2024 |
| 17 | 7 | "The Didgeridoo" | Daniel Lafrance | Kalee StClair | October 4, 2024 |
| 18 | 8 | "Dr. Terrifico's Strength Tonic" | Daniel Lafrance | Ami Boghani | October 4, 2024 |
| 19 | 9 | "The Lapis Scarabs" | George Gipson | Dimitry Pompée | October 4, 2024 |
| 20 | 10 | "The Throne of Sargon" | Daniel Lafrance | Jim Cooper & Jeff Dixon | October 4, 2024 |

== Production ==
On September 15, 2023, it was announced that Apple TV+ had ordered an animated series from DreamWorks Animation Television. Apple TV+ announced a fun-filled autumn slate of all-new kids and family programming, featuring both CG and stop-motion animation. The first season consists of ten episodes each with 23 minutes.

The family-oriented series was created and executive produced by Jim Cooper (DreamWorks Dragons) and Jeff Dixon (The Hurricane Heist). John Krasinski (A Quiet Place Parts I & II) also serves as executive producer and Allyson Seeger (Tom Clancy's Jack Ryan) as co-executive producer. Leo Riley (Guardians of the Galaxy, Tron: Uprising) is the supervising producer, with Chris Copeland (Kipo and the Age of Wonderbeasts) and Justin Copeland (Wonder Woman: Bloodlines) serving as creative consultants.

== Reception ==
=== Critical reception ===
In a review by Brian Kitson for The Cosmic Circus, he said (in his own words) "It's clear that this series is aimed at a younger audience, so the utilization of this formula makes perfect sense. It's easily accessible to children, for which predictability is important for better engagement. But as an adult, I didn't feel tired of the series, in fact, and perhaps in spite of it, I loved every episode of this series. Whatever those behind the Curses! is doing, it's definitely working, as they have another hit on their hands".

Another review by Sam Stone at CBR.com said "It's a solid tonal mix between Indiana Jones and The Real Ghostbusters. And for those looking for a spooky show to share with the whole family this Halloween, Curses! certainly, fits the bill as Apple TV+ continues to expand its original animated and young audience-oriented programming".

In an interview on AWN with Jeff Dixon, he stated “As a massive fan of these EC Comics, I almost yelled at them to get out of my head! We knew we were onto something, but it was quite different from anything DreamWorks had ever done before. It was completely untested and very different from DreamWorks' normal 'house style.' We had to break and alter long-existing pipelines, and DWA not only allowed us but was excited about the potential. They were amazing in allowing us to take some serious chances with brand new styles that were totally original for the company. I will eternally hold them in the highest regard for that.”

"This first season has everything – adventures around the world, frightening journeys into unknown caverns, scares you won't see coming, mysterious characters from around the globe, dangers lurking around every corner, suspense not normally seen in children's animation, and a creepy atmosphere that is unlike anything you've experienced. And a whole bunch of laughs, heart, and emotion as well."

=== Awards and nominations ===
The show was nominated for a Children's and Family Emmy Award for Outstanding Animated Series at the 3rd Children's and Family Emmy Awards. It was also nominated for Best Animated Television/Broadcast Production for Children for the episode "The Baboon Temple" at the 51st Annie Awards. Additionally, it was nominated for Best Youth Programming at the Imagen Foundation Awards as well as Best Animated Series or TV Movie at the 4th Astra TV Awards.
