= Jack Ryan: Ghost War =

- Promotional release poster
- Directed by: Andrew Bernstein
- Screenplay by: Aaron Rabin; John Krasinski
- Story by: Noah Oppenheim; John Krasinski
- Based on: Characters by Tom Clancy
- Produced by: Allyson Seeger; John Krasinski; Andrew Form
- Starring: John Krasinski; Wendell Pierce; Michael Kelly; Max Beesley; JJ Feild; Douglas Hodge; Betty Gabriel; Sienna Miller
- Cinematography: Arnau Valls Colomer
- Edited by: Jason Ballantine
- Music by: Ramin Djawadi; William Marriott
- Production companies: Paramount Pictures; Sunday Night Productions
- Distributed by: Amazon MGM Studios (via Amazon Prime Video)
- Release dates: May 15, 2026 (Regal Times Square); May 20, 2026 (United States)
- Running time: 107 minutes
- Country: United States
- Language: English

Jack Ryan: Ghost War (also known as Tom Clancy's Jack Ryan: Ghost War) is a 2026 American political action thriller film directed by Andrew Bernstein and written by Aaron Rabin and John Krasinski, based on a story by Krasinski and Noah Oppenheim. It is the sixth film and third reboot in the Jack Ryan series. Produced by Paramount Pictures and Sunday Night Productions and distributed by Amazon MGM Studios, it is based on characters from the fictional Ryanverse created by Tom Clancy and a continuation of the Amazon Prime Video television series Jack Ryan (2018–2023). The film stars Krasinski reprising his role as Jack Ryan, alongside Wendell Pierce, Michael Kelly, Max Beesley, JJ Feild, Douglas Hodge, with Betty Gabriel and Sienna Miller.

== Plot ==
In Dubai, an MI6 mission to extract intelligence run by Nigel Cooke fails when his men are killed by Liam Crown. Jack Ryan, now working a civilian job on Wall Street, is approached by his friend James Greer, now CIA deputy director. He reluctantly agrees to collect a package from Cooke whilst on business in Dubai, accompanied by former colleague Mike November. Ryan meets with a distressed Cooke, who hands him a cigarette pack and warns Jack that it's Greer that needs help, before being killed. Ryan and November pursue the man, but he is shot by Crown. The two are then taken into custody by MI6 officer Emma Marlow.

Crown tells Greer he will kill Ryan unless he returns what Cooke gave him. Marlow tells Ryan that Crown is part of Project Starling, a brutal American black-ops program created by Greer and Cooke after 9/11, which was believed to have been disbanded in 2018. In London, Marlow briefs Deputy Chief Andrew Spear of her plans. Ryan meets with Greer at MI6 Headquarters, who justifies creating Starling but claims he shut it down, only for Crown to resurrect it and go rogue after being burned. MI6 and the CIA determine Starling plans to bomb Tower Bridge, recreating an attack they foiled 20 years prior.

CIA Director Elizabeth Wright meets with Chief of MI6 Arnold. Armed police find bombmaking materials in an old Starling safehouse, but Ryan determines that it is a distraction. Crown instead detonates a car bomb, killing Wright, and escapes after a shootout with Greer. Along with Ryan, November and Marlow, they determine Crown is reactivating terrorist groups, to prove the need for off book programs like Starling who can shut them down. Crown demands that Greer return the intel Cooke obtained on Starling. Ryan lies to Crown and says he left it in Dubai. Ryan and Marlow determine Cooke was trying to transmit information on Starling live from a server the night he was killed.

Spear is revealed to be working with Crown. Ryan, Marlow and November return to Dubai and, with help from his former CIA colleague Patrick, determine where Cooke planned to transmit. Ryan connects Patrick to the server, which holds data on the entire Starling network including Spear, and downloads it. They are attacked by Crown and Marlow is injured, but both are rescued by Greer and reinforcements. Crown is wounded, and Ryan shoots him dead when he reaches for his sidearm. Spear is removed from duty by Arnold. Having succeeded Wright as director, Greer recommends the president to nominate Ryan as his deputy.

== Cast ==
- John Krasinski as Jack Ryan, a former U.S. Marine officer and Afghanistan veteran, ostensibly retired as a Central Intelligence Agency (CIA) field operative and working in hedge fund risk management
- Wendell Pierce as James Greer, the Deputy Director of the CIA
- Michael Kelly as Mike November, a CIA security contractor and former station chief in Venezuela
- Max Beesley as Liam Crown, a VC-decorated rogue black-ops soldier and disillusioned former MI6 operative
- JJ Feild as Andrew Spear, the Deputy Chief of MI6
- Douglas Hodge as Nigel Cooke, a senior MI6 officer
- Betty Gabriel as Elizabeth Wright, the Director of the CIA
- Sienna Miller as Emma Marlow, an MI6 officer who works with Ryan

Additionally, Adam Bernett appears as Patrick Klinghoffer, Ryan's former colleague at the CIA; and Dominic Mafham appears as Arnold, the Chief of MI6.

== Production ==
In late October 2024, Amazon MGM Studios announced that a feature film, which serves as a continuation of the television series Jack Ryan was in development, with Andrew Bernstein directing and Aaron Rabin writing the screenplay. John Krasinski who is also producing, reprises his role from the series alongside Wendell Pierce, with Michael Kelly returning as well. In December, Kelly was confirmed to star and Sienna Miller joined the cast. In February 2025, Betty Gabriel, Max Beesley, Douglas Hodge, and JJ Feild joined the cast.

Principal photography began in January 2025, in London, and wrapped in late July.

== Release ==
The world premiere of Jack Ryan: Ghost War was held at the Regal Cinemas theater in Times Square on May 15, 2026. It was released worldwide on Amazon Prime Video on May 20, 2026.

== Reception ==
On the review aggregator website Rotten Tomatoes, 39% of 51 critics' reviews are positive, with an average rating of 5.3/10. The website's consensus reads: "Plowing through a routine globe-trotting with mechanical efficiency but little else, Jack Ryan: Ghost War reduces John Krasinski's once-compelling CIA operative to a personality-free action cipher." Metacritic, which uses a weighted average, assigned the film a score of 38 out of 100, based on 15 critics, indicating "generally unfavorable" reviews.

M.N. Miller of FandomWire wrote that the film "falls short of the original entertaining series run," criticizing it for "trading intelligence for a generic action spectacle."
