= The Hollars =

- Theatrical release poster
- Directed by: John Krasinski
- Written by: James C. Strouse
- Produced by: John Krasinski; Ben Nearn; Tom Rice; Allyson Seeger
- Starring: Sharlto Copley; Charlie Day; Richard Jenkins; Anna Kendrick; John Krasinski; Margo Martindale
- Cinematography: Eric Alan Edwards
- Edited by: Terel Gibson
- Music by: Josh Ritter
- Production companies: Groundswell Productions; Sycamore Pictures; Sunday Night Productions
- Distributed by: Sony Pictures Classics
- Release dates: January 24, 2016 (Sundance); August 26, 2016 (United States)
- Running time: 89 minutes
- Country: United States
- Language: English
- Budget: $3.8 million
- Box office: $1.1 million

The Hollars is a 2016 American comedy-drama film directed by John Krasinski and written by James C. Strouse. The film stars an ensemble cast led by Krasinski, starring Anna Kendrick, Sharlto Copley, Charlie Day, Richard Jenkins, and Margo Martindale. The world premiere took place at the Sundance Film Festival on January 24, 2016, and it was released on August 26, 2016, by Sony Pictures Classics.

== Plot ==
Struggling New York City graphic novelist John Hollar learns that his mother, Sally is diagnosed with a brain tumor, and joins his brother, Ron, and father, Don, by her side. Her attending physician Dr. Fong tells them that the tumor is scheduled to be removed later that week. John is also facing the birth of his first child with his girlfriend Rebecca. Ron is spying on his ex-wife Stacey, whom he divorced years ago, but he is confronted by her new partner Reverend Dan. John meets his high school classmate and mother's nurse Jason, who married Gwen, John's ex-fiancée. Jason rightly suspects that Gwen only married him after becoming pregnant with their child, and still has feelings for John.

Don is forced to work at the wine shop to support his failing plumbing business. At night, Ron sneaks inside Stacey's house to see his two daughters, but is subsequently arrested by the police when Stacey finds out. He is immediately bailed when Rev. Dan learns how much he loves his kids. One day before her operation, John and Sally sneak out of the hospital to enjoy her last meal. On the day of the operation, the doctors successfully remove the tumor, but later, she dies with Don at her side. Don emotionally reads a letter Sally wrote before she died. Rev. Dan marries John and Rebecca, and later, in the middle of their mother's funeral, John, Ron, and Don rush Rebecca to the hospital as she goes into labor.

== Cast ==
- John Krasinski as John Hollar
- Sharlto Copley as Ron Hollar
- Richard Jenkins as Don Hollar, Ron and John's father
- Margo Martindale as Sally Hollar, Ron and John's mother
- Anna Kendrick as Rebecca, John's girlfriend
- Mary Elizabeth Winstead as Gwen, John's ex-fiancée
- Charlie Day as Jason, John's high school classmate and Gwen's husband
- Ashley Dyke as Stacey, Ron's ex-wife
- Josh Groban as Reverend Dan, Stacey's partner
- Randall Park as Dr. Fong, Sally's physician
- Mary Kay Place as Pam
- Tonea Stewart as Latisha

== Production ==
On May 5, 2014, it was announced John Krasinski would direct the film, with Krasinski, Anna Kendrick, Margo Martindale and Richard Jenkins joining the cast. Principal photography and production began on July 15, 2014, and ended on August 15, 2014. Principal photography took place on location in Mississippi, including Brookhaven, Jackson and Canton. According to Krasinski, editing was completed on January 16, 2015. Josh Ritter composed the film's score.

== Release ==
The Hollars premiered at the 2016 Sundance Film Festival on January 24, 2016. On January 29, 2016, Sony Pictures Classics acquired all rights to its United States and Asia release. The film was released on August 26, 2016, by Sony Pictures Classics.

== Reception ==
=== Critical response ===
On review aggregator website Rotten Tomatoes, the film holds an approval rating of 46%, based on 93 reviews, with an average rating of 5.40/10. The site's critical consensus reads, "The Hollars gathers an impressive assortment of talented stars; unfortunately, it's all in service of a story that's been played out more effectively in countless other indie dramedies." Metacritic gives the film a score of 53 out of 100, based on 27 critics, indicating "mixed or average reviews".

=== Accolades ===
Award	Category	Nominee	Result	Ref.
Teen Choice Awards	Choice Movie Actress: AnTEENcipated	Anna Kendrick	Nominated	
