= Mike and Dave Need Wedding Dates =

2016 film by Jake Szymanski

- Theatrical release poster
- Directed by: Jake Szymanski
- Written by: Andrew Jay Cohen; Brendan O'Brien
- Produced by: Peter Chernin; Jenno Topping; Jonathan Levine
- Starring: Zac Efron; Anna Kendrick; Adam DeVine; Aubrey Plaza; Stephen Root
- Cinematography: Matthew Clark
- Edited by: Jonathan Schwartz; Lee Haxall
- Music by: Jeff Cardoni
- Production company: Chernin Entertainment
- Distributed by: 20th Century Fox
- Release date: July 8, 2016 (United States)
- Running time: 98 minutes
- Country: United States
- Language: English
- Budget: $33–35 million
- Box office: $77.1 million

Mike and Dave Need Wedding Dates is a 2016 American romantic comedy film directed by Jake Szymanski and written by Andrew Jay Cohen and Brendan O'Brien. The film stars Zac Efron and Adam DeVine as the title characters, two brothers who advertise for dates to their sister's wedding. The film features Anna Kendrick and Aubrey Plaza as the women who answer the ad. The film is based on an actual news event of a Craigslist ad placed by two brothers who wanted dates for their cousin's wedding. The event became popular in February 2013, and the brothers then turned the situation into a book, Mike and Dave Need Wedding Dates: And a Thousand Cocktails.

The film premiered in Los Angeles on June 30, 2016, and was theatrically released on July 8, 2016, by 20th Century Fox. It received mixed reviews from critics and grossed $77.1 million worldwide against a $33–35 million budget.

== Plot ==
Brothers Mike and Dave Stangle are liquor salesmen whose antics ruin their family's gatherings. With their younger sister Jeanie's wedding in Hawaii approaching, their parents tell them they must bring dates to the wedding to keep them out of trouble.

Mike and Dave put out an ad for dates on Craigslist. The ad goes viral and the brothers go on The Wendy Williams Show to advertise themselves. Meanwhile, Tatiana and Alice are two young women who have just been fired from their waitressing jobs. After seeing the brothers' appearance on television, Tatiana decides that this free trip is just the vacation they need, and they clean themselves up.

While the brothers are at a bar, Tatiana—to get their attention—throws herself in front of a moving car outside the bar. After the girls let the brothers think Mike saved Tatiana's life, they all go on a date. Tatiana, posing as a school teacher, flirts with Mike but has no intention of having sex with him. Alice, who is pretending to be a hedge fund manager, thinks sleeping with Dave is just what she needs to get over her ex-fiancé, who left her at the altar. Thinking their family will like the girls, the brothers invite them to Hawaii.

In Hawaii, Tatiana and Alice charm the Stangle family. Dave finds himself falling for Alice, while Mike and their bisexual female cousin Terry begin competing for Tatiana's attention. The girls convince Jeanie and her fiancé Eric to take an ATV tour through the mountains. Alice and Tatiana show off by performing tricks on their ATVs; Mike attempts to do the same trick, but ends up accidentally crashing into Jeanie, which severely bruises the right side of her face and knocks her out unconscious.

Feeling bad for Jeanie, Alice bribes a masseur to give Jeanie a massage with a tantric style "happy ending" to help her relax. Tatiana goes into a sauna and runs into Terry, who offers her backstage passes to Rihanna if she fingers her. Meanwhile, Mike walks in on Jeanie having an orgasm during the massage. Then he finds Tatiana and Terry together, the cousins fight, and Tatiana accidentally admits the girls are only interested in the free vacation.

Dave and Alice connect on a walk, where she tells him she was left at the altar. When Mike tells Dave how the girls tricked them into the invite, they disagree over how to handle the situation.

At the rehearsal dinner, Jeanie opens up to Alice over her fears about getting married and Eric being boring. To help calm her nerves, Alice gives her ecstasy. Mike drags Dave backstage and demands he practice their speech instead of spending more time with Alice. They get into an argument, and Mike reveals what he saw in the massage parlor and the sauna—unaware that they are being broadcast over the speaker system. The argument gets physical in front of the entire wedding party, ruining the rehearsal dinner.

High on ecstasy, Jeanie and Alice get naked and release a corral of horses, while Tatiana apologizes to Mike; they relate over how similar they are. After yelling at Alice, Dave gets them both back to the resort, where Eric, mad about the massage, calls off the wedding.

The next day, the brothers make up and agree to work together to get the wedding back on track. At the same time, Tatiana and Alice feel guilty and also agree to fix the wedding. All four of them go to Jeanie and Eric's room to apologize, which ends up in an argument over who was most at fault.

Eric, having had enough of all their selfishness, berates all of them and gives Jeanie an early honeymoon present: tickets for a hot air balloon ride, which Jeanie wanted for their honeymoon even though Eric is afraid of heights. With the wedding back on, the four scramble to get a venue and food for the reception.

Jeanie and Eric end up getting married outside the stables. After the wedding, Tatiana and Mike decide to go into business together. Alice deletes her wedding video before making out with Dave. The brothers perform a heartfelt duet to celebrate Jeanie's marriage; Alice and Tatiana then join them for a raunchy dance number. The fireworks display the brothers set off catches fire, scattering the wedding party.

== Cast ==
- Zac Efron as Dave Stangle, Mike's younger brother
- Adam DeVine as Mike Stangle, Dave's older brother
- Anna Kendrick as Alice Davis, Dave's love interest
- Aubrey Plaza as Tatiana Darcy, Mike's love interest
- Stephen Root as Burt Stangle, Mike & Dave's father
- Stephanie Faracy as Rosie Stangle, Mike & Dave's mother
- Sugar Lyn Beard as Jeanie Stangle, Mike & Dave's younger sister
- Sam Richardson as Eric Huddle, Jeanie's fiancé
- Alice Wetterlund as Cousin Terry
- Mary Holland as Becky
- Kumail Nanjiani as Keanu
- Jake Johnson as Ronnie
- Marc Maron as Randy
- Wendy Williams as Herself
- Branscombe Richmond as Kalani Chef
- Chloe Bridges as Apartment Chloe
- Lavell Crawford as Keith
- Erik Griffin as Driver

== Production ==
The film is based on a real event in which brothers Mike and Dave Stangle posted a humorous ad looking for wedding dates on Craigslist. The Stangles had a friend, Jay Barbeau, who worked at the Creative Artists Agency and, after the ad became popular, helped the brothers sign both a film and a book deal.

=== Casting ===
In January 2015, Zac Efron joined the cast of the film, and by that February Adam DeVine was reported to be in negotiations. DeVine was initially insecure about starring alongside Efron, due to the difference in physique stating, "I was working so hard to get into great shape, because I was going to have to stand next to him." DeVine suspected that in preparation for the role that Efron did not work out at his normal capacity to "meet me in the middle".

In April 2015, Aubrey Plaza and Anna Kendrick joined the cast. In May 2015, Stephen Root joined the cast of the film, portraying the role of Efron and DeVine's characters' father.

=== Filming ===
Principal photography began on May 25, 2015, and lasted through August 13, 2015, much of it on location at the Turtle Bay Resort on the North Shore of the island of Oahu, Hawaii.

== Release ==
The film was released on July 8, 2016, by 20th Century Fox.

=== Home media ===
Mike and Dave Need Wedding Dates was released on Digital HD on September 16, 2016, and on Ultra HD Blu-ray, Blu-ray and DVD on September 27, 2016, by 20th Century Fox Home Entertainment.

=== Box office ===
Mike and Dave Need Wedding Dates grossed $46 million in North America and $31 million in other territories for a worldwide total of $77 million, against a budget of $33 million.

The film opened alongside The Secret Life of Pets and was projected to gross $13–17 million in its opening weekend. It grossed $1.6 million from its Thursday night previews, on par with Efron's Neighbors 2: Sorority Rising ($1.7 million), and $6.7 million on its first day. In its opening weekend the film grossed $16.6 million, finishing fourth at the box office behind Secret Life of Pets ($103.2 million), The Legend of Tarzan ($20.6 million) and Finding Dory ($20.3 million).

=== Critical response ===
On Rotten Tomatoes, the film has an approval rating of 38% based on 170 reviews, with an average rating of 4.77/10. The site's critics consensus reads, "Mike and Dave Need Wedding Dates benefits from the screwball premise and the efforts of a game cast, even if the sporadically hilarious results don't quite live up to either." On Metacritic, the film has a weighted average score of 51 out of 100, based on 32 critics, indicating "mixed or average reviews". Audiences polled by CinemaScore gave the film an average grade of "B" on an A+ to F scale.

Aubrey Plaza's performance was particularly praised, and is often noted as a highlight of the film. The Guardian wrote, "Mike and Dave Need Wedding Dates is very much an ensemble comedy, but much like A Fish Called Wanda earned Kevin Kline the Oscar, Plaza’s ineffable style of comedy (which weirdly teeters between broad farce and muted disinterest) suits the material so perfectly she leaves the others in the dust." Variety stated "where the comedy really takes off, Aubrey Plaza, who was so sharp playing a good girl pretending to be bad in The To Do List, is even sharper playing a bad girl pretending to be good. She’s got a face made for deception — she’s like a devil doll, eyebrows lowering with cunning — and her line readings are killer."
