= List of 2016 box office number-one films in Austria =

This is a list of films which placed number one at the weekend box office for the year 2016.

== Number-one films ==
†	This implies the highest-grossing movie of the year.

#	Date	Film	Ref.
1	January 3, 2016	Star Wars: The Force Awakens	
2	January 10, 2016	The Revenant	
3	January 17, 2016	The Revenant	
4	January 24, 2016	The Revenant	
5	January 31, 2016	The Hateful Eight	
6	February 7, 2016	The Hateful Eight	
7	February 14, 2016	Deadpool	
8	February 21, 2016	Deadpool	
9	February 28, 2016	Deadpool	
10	March 6, 2016	Zootopia	
11	March 13, 2016	Zootopia	
12	March 20, 2016	Zootopia	
13	March 27, 2016	Batman v Superman: Dawn of Justice	
14	April 3, 2016	Batman v Superman: Dawn of Justice	
15	April 10, 2016	How to Be Single	
16	April 17, 2016	The Jungle Book	
17	April 24, 2016	The Jungle Book	
18	May 1, 2016	Captain America: Civil War	
19	May 8, 2016	Neighbors 2: Sorority Rising	
20	May 15, 2016	Neighbors 2: Sorority Rising	
21	May 22, 2016	X-Men: Apocalypse	
22	May 29, 2016	Warcraft	
23	June 5, 2016	Warcraft	
24	June 12, 2016	Warcraft	
25	June 19, 2016	Central Intelligence	
26	June 26, 2016	Me Before You	
27	July 3, 2016	Ice Age: Collision Course	
28	July 10, 2016	Ice Age: Collision Course	
29	July 17, 2016	Independence Day: Resurgence	
30	July 24, 2016	Star Trek Beyond	
31	July 31, 2016	The Secret Life of Pets †	
32	August 7, 2016	The Secret Life of Pets †	
33	August 14, 2016	The Secret Life of Pets †	
34	August 21, 2016	Suicide Squad	
35	August 28, 2016	Suicide Squad	
36	September 4, 2016	Suicide Squad	
37	September 11, 2016	Nerve	
38	September 18, 2016	Nerve	
39	September 25, 2016	Bad Moms	
40	October 2, 2016	Finding Dory	
41	October 9, 2016	Finding Dory	
42	October 16, 2016	Inferno	
43	October 23, 2016	Inferno	
44	October 30, 2016	Doctor Strange	
45	November 6, 2016	Doctor Strange	
46	November 13, 2016	Jack Reacher: Never Go Back	
47	November 20, 2016	Fantastic Beasts and Where to Find Them	
48	November 27, 2016	Fantastic Beasts and Where to Find Them	
49	December 4, 2016	Fantastic Beasts and Where to Find Them	
50	December 11, 2016	Sing	
51	December 18, 2016	Rogue One: A Star Wars Story	
52	December 25, 2016	Rogue One: A Star Wars Story	
53	January 1, 2017	Assassin's Creed	

== Most successful films by box office admissions ==
Most successful films of 2016 by number of movie tickets sold in Austria.

Rank	Title	Tickets sold	Country
1.	The Secret Life of Pets	538,988	United States
2.	Finding Dory	479,255	United States
3.	Ice Age: Collision Course	438,472	United States
4.	Zootopia	397,066	United States
5.	The Revenant	352,216	United States
6.	Deadpool	334,421	United States
7.	Rogue One: A Star Wars Story	329,993	United States
8.	Bad Moms	312,669	United States
9.	Fantastic Beasts and Where to Find Them	294,454	United States
10.	Dirty Grandpa	289,590	United States

== See also ==
- Cinema of Austria

Preceded by 2015	2016	Succeeded by 2017
