= List of 2014 box office number-one films in Austria =

This is a list of films which placed number one at the weekend box office for the year 2014.

== Number-one films ==
†	This implies the highest-grossing movie of the year.

#	Date	Film	Ref.
1	January 5, 2014	The Hobbit: The Desolation of Smaug	
2	January 12, 2014	The Physician	
3	January 19, 2014	The Wolf of Wall Street	
4	January 26, 2014	The Wolf of Wall Street	
5	February 2, 2014	The Wolf of Wall Street	
6	February 9, 2014	Joy of Fatherhood	
7	February 16, 2014	Joy of Fatherhood	
8	February 23, 2014	Joy of Fatherhood	
9	March 2, 2014	Mr. Peabody & Sherman	
10	March 9, 2014	300: Rise of an Empire	
11	March 16, 2014	300: Rise of an Empire	
12	March 23, 2014	Need for Speed	
13	March 30, 2014	Captain America: The Winter Soldier	
14	April 6, 2014	Rio 2	
15	April 13, 2014	Rio 2	
16	April 20, 2014	The Amazing Spider-Man 2	
17	April 27, 2014	The Amazing Spider-Man 2	
18	May 4, 2014	The Other Woman	
19	May 11, 2014	Neighbors	
20	May 18, 2014	Godzilla	
21	May 25, 2014	X-Men: Days of Future Past	
22	June 1, 2014	Maleficent	
23	June 8, 2014	Maleficent	
24	June 15, 2014	The Fault in Our Stars	
25	June 22, 2014	The Pirate Fairy	
26	June 29, 2014	Walk of Shame	
27	July 6, 2014	Tammy	
28	July 13, 2014	Tammy	
29	July 20, 2014	Transformers: Age of Extinction	
30	July 27, 2014	How to Train Your Dragon 2	
31	August 3, 2014	22 Jump Street	
32	August 10, 2014	Dawn of the Planet of the Apes	
33	August 17, 2014	Lucy	
34	August 24, 2014	Lucy	
35	August 31, 2014	Guardians of the Galaxy	
36	September 7, 2014	Hercules	
37	September 14, 2014	Sex Tape	
38	September 21, 2014	Sex Tape	
39	September 28, 2014	Sex Tape	
40	October 5, 2014	Dracula Untold	
41	October 12, 2014	Dracula Untold	
42	October 19, 2014	Teenage Mutant Ninja Turtles	
43	October 26, 2014	Teenage Mutant Ninja Turtles	
44	November 2, 2014	The Maze Runner	
45	November 9, 2014	Interstellar	
46	November 16, 2014	Interstellar	
47	November 23, 2014	The Hunger Games: Mockingjay – Part 1	
48	November 30, 2014	The Hunger Games: Mockingjay – Part 1	
49	December 7, 2014	The Hunger Games: Mockingjay – Part 1	
50	December 14, 2014	The Hobbit: The Battle of the Five Armies †	
51	December 21, 2014	The Hobbit: The Battle of the Five Armies †	
52	December 28, 2014	The Hobbit: The Battle of the Five Armies †	

== Most successful films by box office admissions ==
Most successful films of 2014 by number of movie tickets sold in Austria.

Rank	Title	Tickets sold	Country
1.	The Hobbit: The Battle of the Five Armies	519,721	New Zealand, United States
2.	Serial (Bad) Weddings	409,971	France
3.	The Hunger Games: Mockingjay – Part 1	398,235	United States
4.	How to Train Your Dragon 2	367,174	United States
5.	The Wolf of Wall Street	328,120	United States
6.	Rio 2	309,585	United States
7.	Transformers: Age of Extinction	283,327	United States
8.	Neighbors	257,560	United States
9.	Joy of Fatherhood	255,583	Germany
10.	22 Jump Street	240,461	United States

== See also ==
- Cinema of Austria

Preceded by 2013	2014	Succeeded by 2015
