= List of 2017 box office number-one films in Austria =

This is a list of films which placed number one at the weekend box office for the year 2017.

== Number-one films ==
#	Date	Film	Ref.
1	January 8, 2017	Passengers	
2	January 15, 2017	Why Him?	
3	January 22, 2017	XXX: Return of Xander Cage	
4	January 29, 2017	XXX: Return of Xander Cage	
5	February 5, 2017	XXX: Return of Xander Cage	
6	February 12, 2017	Fifty Shades Darker	
7	February 19, 2017	Fifty Shades Darker	
8	February 26, 2017	Wild Mouse	
9	March 5, 2017	Logan	
10	March 12, 2017	Kong: Skull Island	
11	March 19, 2017	Beauty and the Beast	
12	March 26, 2017	Beauty and the Beast	
13	April 2, 2017	The Boss Baby	
14	April 9, 2017	The Boss Baby	
15	April 16, 2017	The Fate of the Furious	
16	April 23, 2017	The Fate of the Furious	
17	April 30, 2017	Guardians of the Galaxy Vol. 2	
18	May 7, 2017	Guardians of the Galaxy Vol. 2	
19	May 14, 2017	Guardians of the Galaxy Vol. 2	
20	May 21, 2017	Alien: Covenant	
21	May 28, 2017	Pirates of the Caribbean: Dead Men Tell No Tales	
22	June 4, 2017	Baywatch	
23	June 11, 2017	Baywatch	
24	June 18, 2017	Baywatch	
25	June 25, 2017	Transformers: The Last Knight	
26	July 2, 2017	Transformers: The Last Knight	
27	July 9, 2017	Despicable Me 3	
28	July 16, 2017	Despicable Me 3	
29	July 23, 2017	Despicable Me 3	
30	July 30, 2017	Despicable Me 3	
31	August 6, 2017	War for the Planet of the Apes	
32	August 13, 2017	Grießnockerlaffäre	
33	August 20, 2017	Bullyparade – Der Film	
34	August 27, 2017	Annabelle: Creation	
35	September 3, 2017	Bullyparade – Der Film	
36	September 10, 2017	American Made	
37	September 17, 2017	American Made	
38	September 24, 2017	Kingsman: The Golden Circle	
39	October 1, 2017	It	
40	October 8, 2017	It	
41	October 15, 2017	It	
42	October 22, 2017	It	
43	October 29, 2017	Fack ju Göhte 3	
44	November 5, 2017	Fack ju Göhte 3	
45	November 12, 2017	A Bad Moms Christmas	
46	November 19, 2017	A Bad Moms Christmas	
47	November 26, 2017	A Bad Moms Christmas	
48	December 3, 2017	Coco	
49	December 10, 2017	Coco	
50	December 17, 2017	Star Wars: The Last Jedi	
51	December 24, 2017	Star Wars: The Last Jedi	
52	December 31, 2017	Star Wars: The Last Jedi	

== Most successful films by box office admissions ==
Most successful films of 2017 by number of movie tickets sold in Austria.

Rank	Title	Tickets sold	Country
1.	Fack ju Göhte 3	538,819	Germany
2.	Despicable Me 3	505,498	United States
3.	Fifty Shades Darker	454,919	United States, China
4.	Star Wars: The Last Jedi	451,287	United States
5.	The Fate of the Furious	441,131	United States, China, Japan
6.	Beauty and the Beast	401,072	United States
7.	Baywatch	335,073	United States, Canada
8.	It	333,908	United States
9.	Pirates of the Caribbean: Dead Men Tell No Tales	320,150	United States
10.	Guardians of the Galaxy Vol. 2	292,703	United States

== See also ==
- Cinema of Austria

Preceded by 2016	2017	Succeeded by 2018
