= Teenage Mutant Ninja Turtles: Mutant Mayhem =

2023 American animated superhero film

- Theatrical release poster
- Directed by: Jeff Rowe
- Screenplay by: Seth Rogen; Evan Goldberg; Jeff Rowe; Dan Hernandez Benji Samit
- Story by: Brendan O'Brien; Seth Rogen; Evan Goldberg; Jeff Rowe
- Based on: Teenage Mutant Ninja Turtles characters by: Peter Laird; Kevin Eastman
- Produced by: Seth Rogen; Evan Goldberg; James Weaver
- Starring: Micah Abbey; Shamon Brown Jr.; Nicolas Cantu; Brady Noon; Ayo Edebiri; Maya Rudolph; John Cena; Seth Rogen; Rose Byrne; Natasia Demetriou; Giancarlo Esposito; Jackie Chan; Ice Cube; Paul Rudd
- Cinematography: Kent Seki
- Edited by: Greg Levitan
- Music by: Trent Reznor; Atticus Ross
- Production companies: Paramount Pictures; Nickelodeon Movies; Point Grey Pictures
- Distributed by: Paramount Pictures
- Release dates: June 12, 2023 (Annecy); August 2, 2023 (United States)
- Running time: 99 minutes
- Country: United States
- Language: English
- Budget: $70 million
- Box office: $182 million

Teenage Mutant Ninja Turtles: Mutant Mayhem is a 2023 American animated superhero comedy film directed by Jeff Rowe, who co-wrote it with Seth Rogen, Evan Goldberg, Dan Hernandez and Benji Samit. The film is based on the Teenage Mutant Ninja Turtles characters and is a reboot of the related film series. It stars Micah Abbey, Shamon Brown Jr., Nicolas Cantu, and Brady Noon as the voices of the Turtles, alongside Ayo Edebiri, Maya Rudolph, John Cena, Rogen, Rose Byrne, Natasia Demetriou, Giancarlo Esposito, Jackie Chan, Ice Cube and Paul Rudd. The story follows four anthropomorphic mutant turtles as they seek acceptance by the human world and use their ninja training to face a criminal mutant gang.

Plans for an animated Turtles film with Rogen began in 2018. The film was announced in June 2020, with Rogen, Goldberg, and James Weaver producing through their company Point Grey Pictures, and Rowe as director. Seeking to explore the teenage aspect of the Turtles, the filmmakers drew inspiration from teenage coming-of-age films. The animation was provided by Mikros Animation and Cinesite and was influenced by notebook sketches. In addition to a score composed by Trent Reznor and Atticus Ross, the film features various classic East Coast hip-hop songs.

Following a work-in-progress screening at the Annecy International Animation Film Festival on June 12, 2023, Mutant Mayhem was released by Paramount Pictures in the United States on August 2. It received positive reviews from critics for its voice acting, screenplay and stylized animation; several critics considered it the best Turtles film. The film was a box office success, grossing $182 million worldwide against its $70 million budget. Its nominations include Best Animated Feature at the 29th Critics' Choice Awards, 51st Annie Awards and 35th Producers Guild of America Awards.

A sequel is set for August 13, 2027. A follow-up television series, Tales of the Teenage Mutant Ninja Turtles, debuted on Paramount+ in August 2024, and ran for two seasons before concluding in December 2025.

== Plot ==
Techno Cosmic Research Institute (TCRI) executive Cynthia Utrom sends a squad to hunt down rogue scientist Baxter Stockman, who has created a mutagenic ooze with which he intends to form his own mutant animal family, starting with a housefly. Baxter is interrupted by Cynthia's strike force and killed in the resulting explosion, while the mutagen falls into the sewers of New York City. The mutagen turns four turtle brothers—Leonardo, Raphael, Donatello and Michelangelo—and a rat named Splinter into humanoid mutants, whereupon Splinter adopts the turtles. Splinter distrusts humanity—particularly after one encounter where he and the turtles were chased away when he tried to give them a walk through the surface—and trains his sons in the art of ninjutsu, instructing them to only leave their sewer home to steal supplies. Over the years, the Turtles long to live with and like humans their age, much to Splinter's dismay, due to his past of being rejected by everyone.

Fifteen years later, the Turtles defeat a gang of criminals to recover a stolen moped belonging to a teenager named April O'Neil, revealing themselves and their origins. April, an aspiring journalist, has been investigating a series of robberies of TCRI technology by a criminal known as "Superfly". The Turtles plan to stop Superfly and, through April's reporting, win public acceptance as heroes. They intercept a piece of stolen technology and meet Superfly under the Brooklyn Bridge, discovering that he is not only a mutant himself, but leader of a mutant gang. Ecstatic to meet fellow mutants, the Turtles bond with Superfly and the others and he reveals their creation at the hands of Stockman, explaining that they evaded TCRI and are living on an abandoned ship in Staten Island. He then reveals that he plans to use the stolen technology to mutate every animal on Earth and create a world where mutants have dominance over humans.

The Turtles try to intervene, but the gang escapes with the equipment while a tracker TCRI installed on the equipment falls back with the Turtles, allowing them to be captured. At TCRI headquarters, Cynthia extracts the Turtles' mutagen, but April arrives with Splinter to rescue them. At the gang's hideout, Splinter and the Turtles convince them that their plan for domination will make them no better than the worst of humanity, and together they turn on Superfly, destroying his machine. However, the ooze falls into the water, combining marine wildlife with Superfly, who then transforms into a gigantic whale-like kaiju after grabbing animals from a nearby zoo. He attacks the city and the Turtles and other mutants attempt to stop him but are assumed by the public to be fellow monsters.

Leonardo finds his voice as a leader while April overcomes her anxiety and commandeers a news broadcast to explain the mutants' good intentions and the citizens of New York come to their aid. With the help of the citizens and other mutants, the Turtles drop a canister of TCRI retro-mutagen into Superfly's blowhole, turning him back into a collection of normal animals. Reconciling with Splinter, the Turtles, April, and the mutants are celebrated by the city. The Turtles enroll at April's high school, where they are embraced as heroes.

While the Turtles and April enjoy themselves at prom, they are under surveillance from Cynthia (holding the now unmutated Superfly captive), who plans to recapture the Turtles by enlisting the aid of the mysterious Shredder.

== Voice cast ==
- Nicolas Cantu as Leonardo: The leader of the Turtles who uses two katana. He has a romantic interest in April O'Neil.
- Brady Noon as Raphael: The muscle of the Turtles who uses a pair of sai. He has a "fight first, ask questions later" attitude.
- Micah Abbey as Donatello: The tech guru of the Turtles who uses a bō staff in combat. He has a liking for anime and video games.
- Shamon Brown Jr. as Michelangelo: The fun-loving jokester of Turtles who uses nunchucks. He desires to be a stand-up comedian.
- Ayo Edebiri as April O'Neil: A high school news reporter and human friend of the Turtles.
- Maya Rudolph as Cynthia Utrom: An executive at the shady research organization, the Techno Cosmic Research Institute (TCRI).
- John Cena as Rocksteady: A mutant rhinoceros and member of Superfly's gang.
- Seth Rogen as Bebop: A mutant warthog and member of Superfly's gang.
- Rose Byrne as Leatherhead: A mutant alligator and member of Superfly's gang.
- Natasia Demetriou as Wingnut: A mutant bat and member of Superfly's gang.
- Giancarlo Esposito as Baxter Stockman: A former TCRI scientist who is responsible for the creation of the ooze that mutated the Turtles.
- Jackie Chan as Splinter: A mutant rat and the adoptive father and mentor of the Turtles.
- Ice Cube as Superfly: A mutant fly who desires for mutants to have dominance over humanity.
- Paul Rudd as Mondo Gecko: A mutant gecko and member of Superfly's gang.
- Post Malone as Ray Fillet: A mutant manta ray and member of Superfly's gang.
- Hannibal Buress as Genghis Frog: A mutant frog and member of Superfly's gang.
- MrBeast as a bystander in Times Square who mistakes Splinter for a human wearing a bad Mickey Mouse costume.
- Kevin Eastman as a human that assists Splinter in the climax of the film.
- Alex Hirsch as Scumbug: A mutant cockroach and member of Superfly's gang.
- Bobby Wagner as Man Who Thought a Giant Rat Was a Big Cat But It Was Actually a Rat

== Production ==
=== Development ===
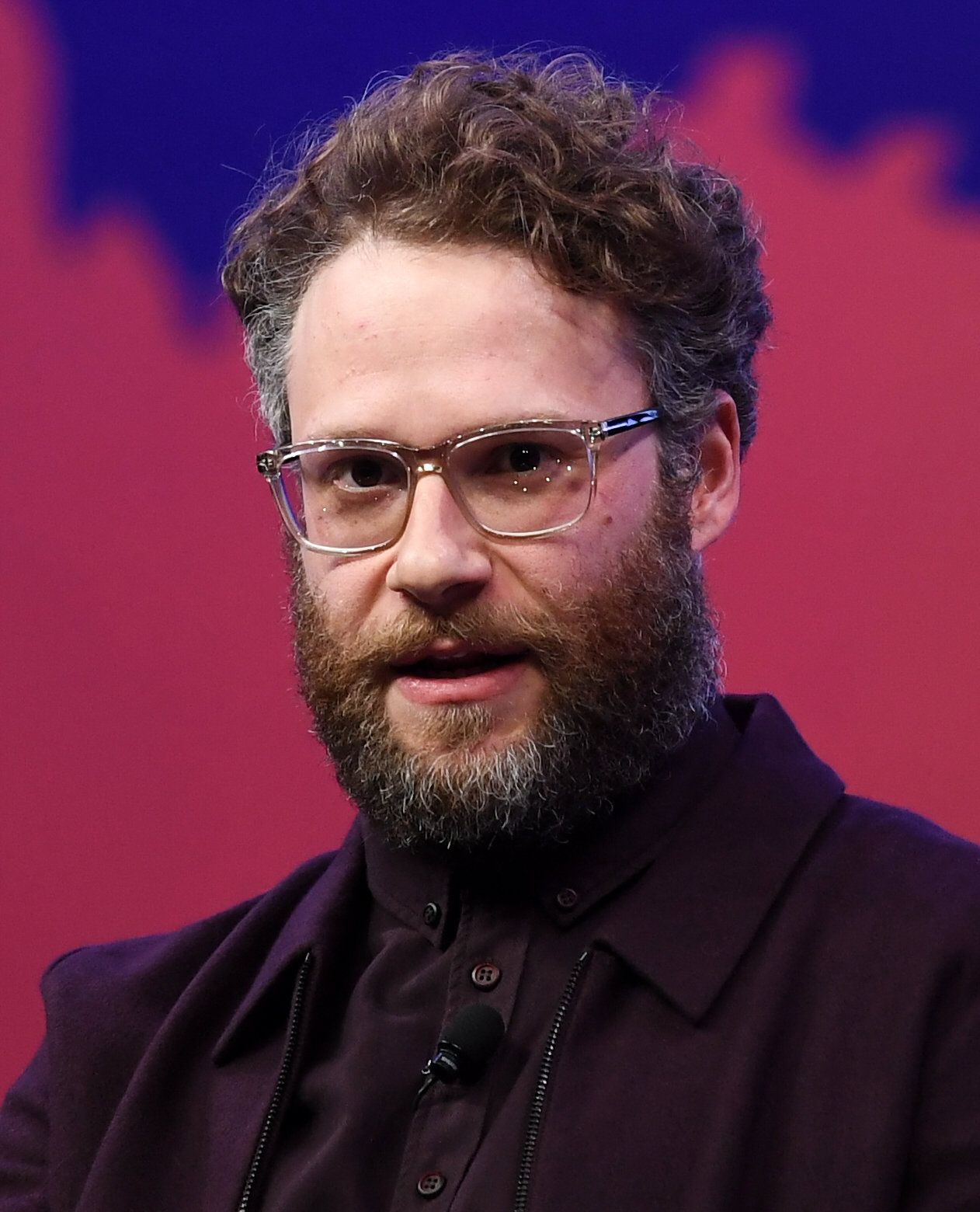
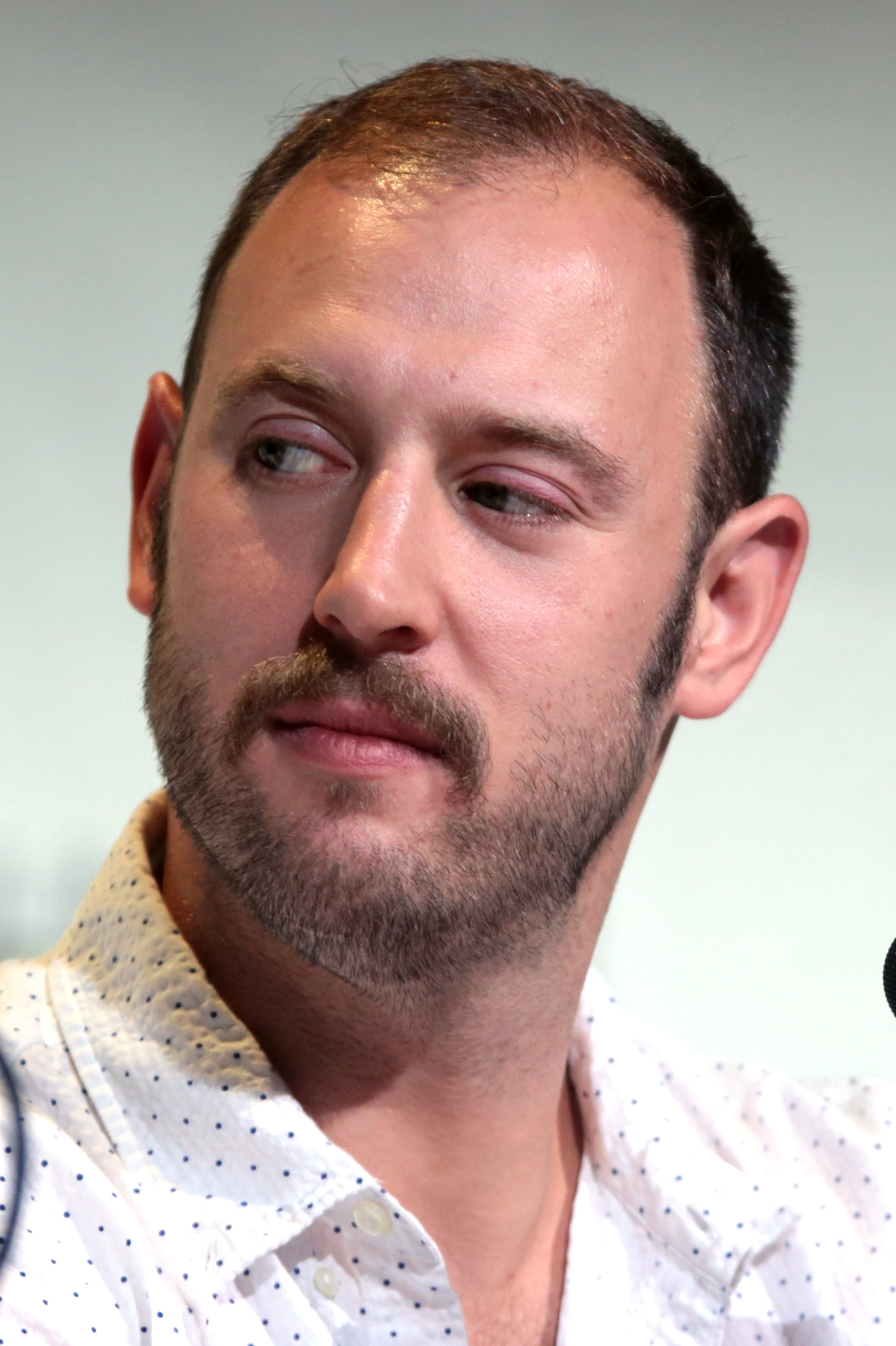
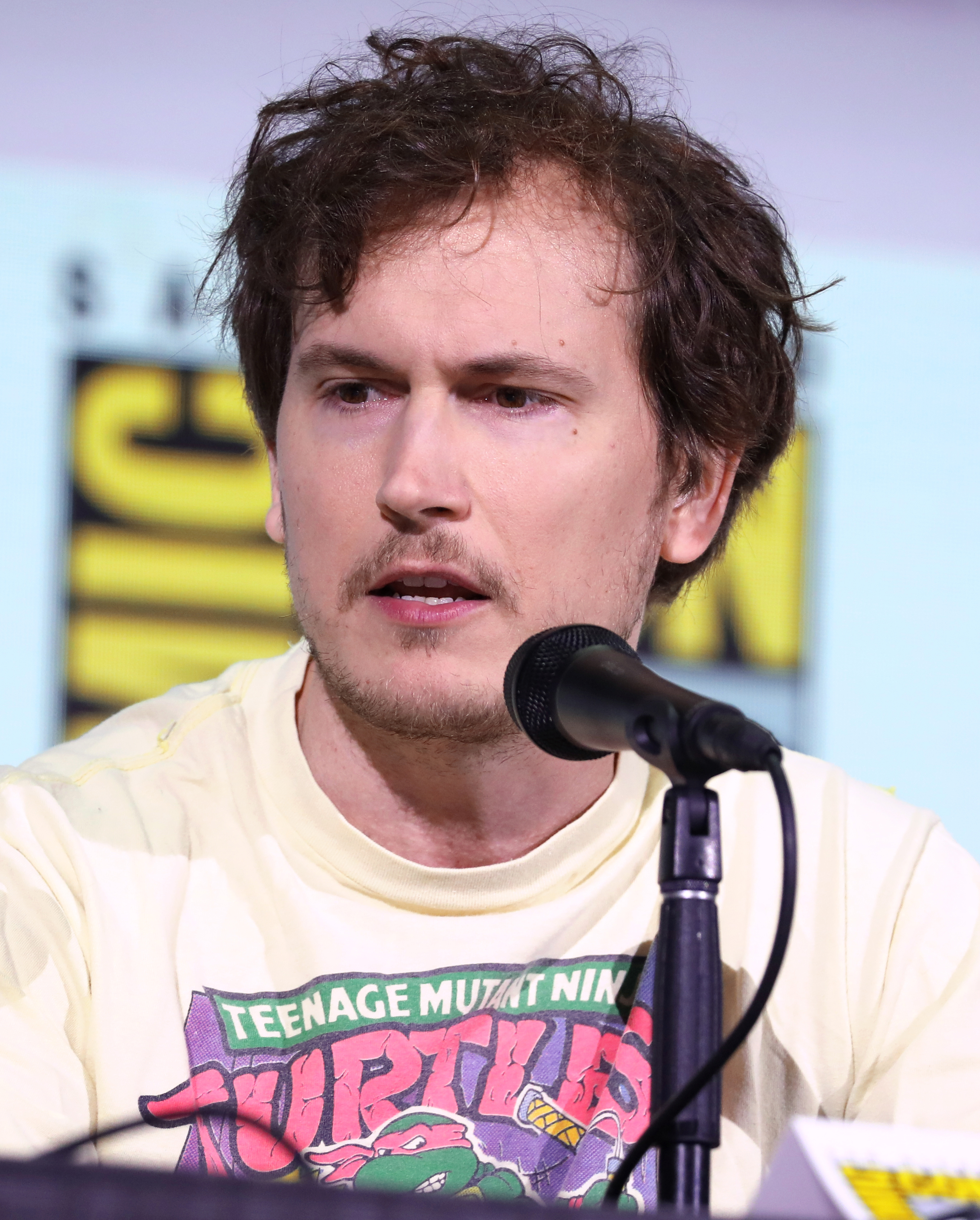
Producers Seth Rogen & Evan Goldberg and director Jeff Rowe

Following the release of Teenage Mutant Ninja Turtles (2014) and its sequel, Out of the Shadows (2016), Brian Robbins felt that the Teenage Mutant Ninja Turtles film series was in dire need of a reboot. He sought advice from longtime Turtles toy manufacturer Playmates Toys, who told him that the reboot should be an animated film. In 2018, Robbins discussed with newly appointed executive vice president of Nickelodeon Animation Studio, Ramsay Naito, who to bring onto the project. Seth Rogen was decided upon, and Jeff Rowe joined the project soon after. In June 2020, Deadline Hollywood reported that Nickelodeon Animation was developing a CG-animated Turtles film for Paramount Pictures. Rowe was hired to direct, from a screenplay by Brendan O'Brien. Rogen, Evan Goldberg, and James Weaver produced through their production company, Point Grey Pictures, which is credited alongside Nickelodeon Movies. Naito and Josh Fagen oversaw production for Nickelodeon and Point Grey, respectively.

In an August 2020 interview with Collider, Rogen said that the film would heavily lean into the teenage element of Turtles. He stated,

As a lifelong fan of Ninja Turtles, weirdly the 'Teenage' part of Teenage Mutant Ninja Turtles was always the part that stuck out to me the most. And as someone who loves teenage movies, and who's made a lot of teenage movies, and who literally got their start in their entire profession by writing a teenage movie, the idea of kind of honing in on that element was really exciting to us. I mean, not disregarding the rest, but really using that as kind of a jumping-off point for the film.

In June 2021, Rogen revealed a teaser image through his Twitter page, which contained school notes written by Leonardo, the film's original release date, and other details. By October 2021, the film was under the working title Teenage Mutant Ninja Turtles: The Next Chapter. Production designer, Yashar Kassai, elaborated on the project, "You anchor yourself enough in the familiar elements of it so that it is easily recognizable, but then you either add to or enhance some of the existing charm of the franchise." The title Teenage Mutant Ninja Turtles: Mutant Mayhem had been finalized by August 2022. Kyler Spears joined the film as co-director, signing on because he had worked with Rowe on his prior film, The Mitchells vs. the Machines (2021). J.J. Villard was commissioned to design the film's logo. Overall, the budget was $70 million at minimum.

=== Writing ===
Rogen, Goldberg, and Rowe, along with the writing team of Dan Hernandez and Benji Samit, received screenplay credit, with O'Brien and the former three having "story by" billing. Rogen and Rowe wanted the film to emphasize the teenage aspect of the Turtles. Rowe compared Mutant Mayhem to the coming-of-age films, Stand by Me (1986) and Lady Bird (2017) and remarked that his goal was to make "the ultimate teenage coming-of-age film". He described the Turtles as having an "inauthentic confidence that teenagers have", adding that teenagers often ''operate with this hyped-up sense of, 'We can do anything!'" The writers wanted to create their own version of Turtles lore and did not take all elements from previous iterations into account. Rowe explained that they aimed "to make it more logical", and skated past a lot of things "to make it really operate from a place of character and relatability". Rowe cited his admiration for the classic Turtles toys as the reason why a lot of mutant characters were written into the film.

Shredder was originally the main villain of the film, but was written out because Rowe wanted the film's villain to be a mutant who could relate to the Turtles and who the Turtles could relate to and be tempted by. Superfly was originally going to be a mutated version of Baxter Stockman, a character who has been turned into a mutant fly in past Turtles media. The two ultimately wound up being separate characters. An early draft of Mutant Mayhem was more of a high school film. Rowe explained that with the initial version, it was hard to make the Turtles' lives intersect with the crime villain plot in a natural way, adding that the Turtles had already achieved their goal early on in the script. As a result, the film had to "reset 30 minutes in", and new characters, other kids in the high school, and relationships had to be established. Rowe described it as "tedious". Eventually, in July 2022, Rogen approached Rowe through text message, telling him that the film was "fundamentally broken" and had to be completely changed, a sentiment with which Rowe agreed. Consequentially, in the next four months, the film was completely rewritten and boarded into its final state.

=== Casting and voice recording ===
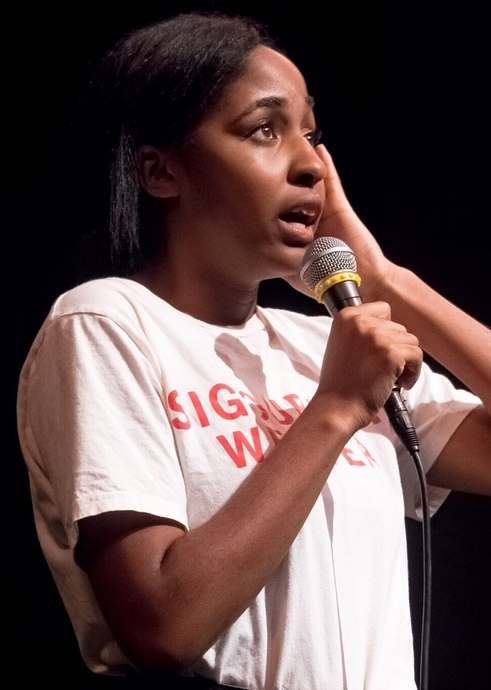
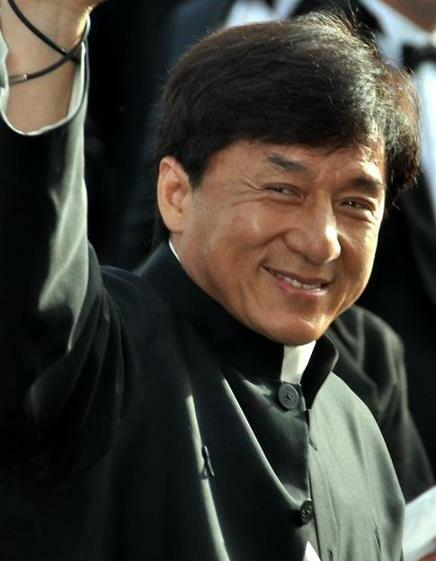
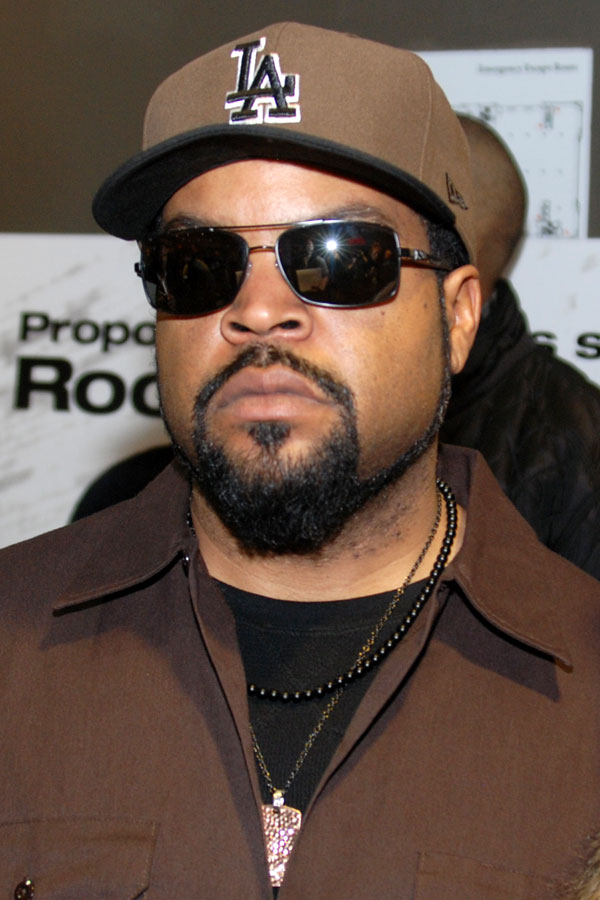
Ayo Edebiri, Jackie Chan, and Ice Cube voice April O'Neil, Splinter, and Superfly, respectively.

On March 4, 2023, during the Nickelodeon Kids' Choice Awards, Rogen revealed that actors Micah Abbey, Shamon Brown Jr., Nicolas Cantu, and Brady Noon (all of whom were in attendance) had been cast in the voice roles of the Turtles: Donatello, Michelangelo, Leonardo, and Raphael. Other cast members revealed in their respective roles in the ceremony were Rogen himself, Hannibal Buress, Rose Byrne, John Cena, Jackie Chan, Ice Cube, Natasia Demetriou, Ayo Edebiri, Giancarlo Esposito, Post Malone, Paul Rudd, and Maya Rudolph.

Mutant Mayhem marks the first time all four Turtles are portrayed by teenage actors. Rogen felt that the decision to cast teenagers for the parts in the film, made it stand out from previous versions of Turtles, saying "something very intuitive became something that really opened up our version". Hundreds of actors auditioned for the roles of the Turtles. Rowe watched every tape and narrowed them down to the ones he felt worked. He edited voices into the character designs to see which suited which. After narrowing it down to ten, Abbey, Brown, Cantu, and Noon had a chemistry table read together, with them ultimately landing the roles. Rowe described the four as "perfect", and the table read as "kinetic and alive". In recruiting Chan, he wrote a letter to him asking if he wanted to be part of a Turtles film. The team held a meeting with Ice Cube, who, when told his character's name was Superfly, laughed and agreed to sign on. Ice Cube also chose to sign on because of his and his son's emotional connection with the Turtles franchise.

Abbey drew from the characteristics of his friends and previous portrayals of the character for his performance as Donatello. Brown did not want to do the typical "surfer dude" voice for Michelangelo during the audition process. Inspired by Brandon Mychal Smith's take on the character in Rise of the Teenage Mutant Ninja Turtles (2018–2020), he sought to do his "own thing with it". Cantu wanted to bring a "quality of nervousness" to Leonardo, feeling that there was a "level of anxiety that comes with leading the group". Noon wanted to balance Raphael's rage with a more lighthearted and funny performance to make him more relatable. In portraying April O'Neil, Edebiri wanted to hearken back to her teenage years and tap into her character's determination. Turtles co-creator Kevin Eastman appears in a voice cameo as a citizen that helps Splinter during the climax, credited as "Good Human". Rowe wanted the role to be voiced by "someone meaningful to the franchise", and chose to cast Eastman as an homage to Stan Lee's cameos in Marvel Comics adaptations until his passing in 2018. Scumbug uses a blend of different voices, including Rowe's, but is ultimately credited to Alex Hirsch.

In contrast to the norm for animation, the cast recorded their voice roles together in groups rather than independently from one another. A single recording session could include up to seven actors. This environment allowed for the cast to play off each other as well as employ a lot of improvisation in their performances. Rogen was partly influenced to apply this approach to the film from his experience recording The Lion King (2019) with Donald Glover and Billy Eichner. He directed particular praise towards Abbey, Brown, Cantu, and Noon and said that they tried to "capture the way they actually interacted with each other" in the film. He recalled an account of one recording session with the quartet and how "they would all hang out together in the kitchen of the recording studio, and they would all just talk over each other and make fun of each other; screaming at each other." According to him, the event was what pushed them to start having the four record together, as he felt that the energy was right for the film.

=== Design ===
Like with his previous outing, The Mitchells vs. the Machines, Rowe wanted Mutant Mayhem to look different from what was expected from an animated film. The director's aim was to make it heavily resemble the concept art. He was inspired by sketches he made in school notebooks as a teenager and how they tend to have a lot of exaggerated features, spikes, and random effects lines, and wanted the film's animation to reflect a similar feeling. Rowe described the film's sketch look as its "North Star", as the comic book-inspired look was for Spider-Man: Into the Spider-Verse (2018).

Production designer Yashar Kassai found working out the style of the film one of the most difficult parts of the production. He and Rowe encouraged the artists to embrace their imperfections and draw like teenagers. Kassai cited the 1987 television series and the classic toyline as big inspirations for the production team. "We were looking back to the time when sophomoric gross-out humor was the comedic style of the day. So we started there, but then we added the teenage drawing aspect on top of it as a very strong top layer." The visuals were also heavily influenced by Wong Kar-wai's films, such as Chungking Express (1994), and the street photography of Alex Webb. The team would select two to three colors for a scene and aim to adhere to realistic photographic principles, contrasting with the abstract design philosophy. Since a lot of the film takes place at night, the artists spent a lot of time diversifying what New York looks like at night and giving it a variety of different color schemes.

Concept art of the Turtles

Rowe and lead character designer Woodrow White pushed for less bulky versions of the Turtles and to have the main four sport more teenage builds. Similar to Michelangelo and his braces, Donatello was given glasses not as a defining trait of geekiness and wisdom but rather as one of adolescence. With Splinter, White wanted to lean into the dad aspect of the character and have him look disheveled "from the stresses of parenthood." As a ninja master, Splinter wears a kataginu he cut from a bathrobe, which also reflects the DIY nature of the character. Additionally, White gave him sweatpants, which he described as "a common staple of stay-at-home parents". Jeff Bridges's Dude character from The Big Lebowski (1998) served as inspiration for Splinter's fashion, while his build was inspired by Danny DeVito. White also studied photos of actual rats when designing the character. For Splinter's fighting style, the filmmakers studied his actor, Jackie Chan, in films such as Police Story (1985) and Rumble in the Bronx (1995).

White did not want to make Leatherhead look too muscular, but rather very much like what an actual alligator would look like if it stood on two legs. He collaborated with Kassai when designing Genghis Frog and based the character's look on that of a pixie frog. Rocksteady was given a larger head to emphasize the character's horn, which White felt was a rhinoceros's defining feature. With Ray Fillet, he wanted to give the character a more "menacing edge" and "inject more manta ray" into him. Similarly, White wanted Wingnut to be more bat-like than previous versions of the character by keeping her wings on her arms.

=== Animation and cinematography ===
Mutant Mayhem was animated by Mikros Animation in Montreal and Paris and Cinesite in Vancouver and Montreal. Mikros was hired in 2022 to handle the bulk of the animation, with Cinesite joining soon after to produce nearly 25 minutes.

Mikros was one of many studios that completed a test shot for the feature. It featured 40 seconds of Donatello talking. The studio was tasked with matching the CGI animation as closely as possible to the 2D reference provided. According to Mikros visual effects supervisor Matthieu Rouxel, Rowe told them, "If the picture looks like a 2D painting when it is not moving, that means we are good". The test helped Mikros realize the need to make specific developments to their rendering for the film: stylized shaders, curves, and edges.

Mikros built a shader prototype using the toonshader of the Autodesk Arnold render engine as a starter base. While the prototype was good for the test, the team knew they had to develop it further for the scale of a film. Rowe told the studio to avoid a "Photoshop filter feeling". The team realized the sophistication of the look and the need to be able to add graphic features to the lighting, "making it look as if they were painted one after another with different strokes". Mikros worked with Marcel Reinhard—the lead developer of shading, lighting, and rendering—to develop a shader that could isolate lights on the shading of objects and characters and give them special treatments. These treatments included scribbles, cross-hatching, stepping, and color transitions.

As the film's stylized CGI employs elements of 2D animation to achieve a sketchbook look, Cinesite's staffers, who had only had experience with CGI, had to quickly learn how to use 2D. To speed up the process, they sought out sequences and style guides from Mikros. Additionally, a group of five traditional 2D effects animators to train the team were assembled, and Toon Boom Animation software was brought into their pipeline. Using these resources and tools, Cinesite developed internal animation tests, with regular feedback from Rowe on whether they matched Mikros' work.

Kent Seki, head of cinematography, wanted to highlight the Turtles' youthfulness by keeping the camera close, handheld, and alive. He described it as being shot like "[you're] on the run" and used teenagers knack for getting into trouble as inspiration. To capture the Turtles as they engaged in antics both comedic and action, he adopted a cinéma vérité style of filming, shaped by the works of Emmanuel Lubezki and Spike Jonze. Seki also sought to contrast Jonze's handheld style with a more formal camera language influenced by early Paul Thomas Anderson and his cinematographer Robert Elswit's work in Boogie Nights (1997). When shooting scenes, they would alternate between these two different methods to present a dichotomy of the teenage world and the adult world: "So if the kids were being reprimanded by Splinter, [we] would be much steadier with the camerawork, and then when we cut back to the kids, they'd be a little bit more handheld, a little more loose, and those kinds of things started to creep into the cinematography."

=== Music ===
In May 2023, it was announced that the score was composed by Trent Reznor and Atticus Ross, with Gabe Hilfer as music supervisor. The score album was released by Reznor's label, The Null Corporation on July 28, 2023. Mutant Mayhem features hip-hop music from popular artists, with a heavy emphasis on classic East Coast hip-hop to go with the film's setting. Many of the songs used in the films were ones that Rogen and Rowe would regularly listen to. An official playlist of some songs featured in the film was released on Spotify.

== Themes ==
Goldberg described the film as overall being about a father, his four sons, and the importance of family. A major theme in the film is acceptance. The Turtles' isolation from the world is meant to mirror a teenager's desire to fit in, and their father, Splinter, fears the worst in humanity after being rejected by them. The theme was an early part of Rogen and Goldberg's pitch. Rowe felt that it was something that had not been tackled in the franchise before, saying "It acknowledges these fantastical things in a way that grounds them in the real world". When asked whether the film was written as an immigration fable, Rowe responded that, while that was not the intention, as the story came along, the team started to recognize the parallels between Splinter and a first-generation parent who moved to the country. According to the director, a lot of the team have had such family situations, and the theme became something they continued to lean on, "so it wasn't the intention, but it became highlighted through execution."

== Release ==
=== Theatrical ===
Teenage Mutant Ninja Turtles: Mutant Mayhem was screened as a work in progress at the Annecy International Animation Film Festival on June 12, 2023. According to TheWrap, the cut shown had "just a few scenes of rough animation but was otherwise complete", including the score. At the end of the screening, the film received a six-minute standing ovation, with audience and social media reactions reportedly being positive. The film was shown at the Paramount Pictures studio lot in Los Angeles on July 29, 2023, billed as a "special family screening". The Hollywood Reporter, however, described the event as essentially a premiere, which the cast could not attend due to the ongoing SAG-AFTRA strike. Mutant Mayhem was theatrically released in the United States on August 2, 2023, and was screened in various formats including Dolby Cinema, 4DX, and RealD 3D. The film also had several promotional advance screenings before its theatrical release.

It was originally scheduled for release on August 11, 2023, but was later pushed a week forward to August 4, 2023 before being pushed forward again by two days to its final date. In the United Kingdom, the film was released two days earlier, on July 31, 2023.

=== Marketing ===
Paramount Consumer Products had partnered with over 400 licensees to promote Teenage Mutant Ninja Turtles: Mutant Mayhem. Promotional partners included Peatos, Fall Guys, Playmates Toys, Hasbro, Mattel, Crayola, Funko, Crocs, General Mills, Build-a-Bear Workshop, Minecraft, The Sims Freeplay, Fruit Ninja, Match Masters, Random House, Bendon Publishing, IDW Publishing, Roblox, Pizza Hut, Xbox, Procter & Gamble, Old El Paso, Gol Airlines, and Chargespot. Additionally, studio parent company Paramount Global engaged in cross-promotion for the film through its TV channels, including airing marathons of the Turtles series' across the domestic Nickelodeon channels. Deadline Hollywood estimated that the film's promotional partner campaign was worth $100 million and drew in over 3 billion impressions.

Rowe discussed the film at the Annecy International Animation Film Festival in June 2022, where a brief bit of animation was shown. Rafael Motamayor of /Film compared the film's visual aesthetic to Arcane, both having a "punk" style that he described as fun. To accompany the title announcement in August 2022, a mural promoting the film went up in New York City. Along with the cast announcement, a sneak peek was shown at the Nickelodeon Kids' Choice Awards on March 4, 2023. A teaser trailer was released online on March 6, 2023 set to A Tribe Called Quest's "Can I Kick It?". Charles Pulliam-Moore at The Verge gave the trailer a positive review and called the animation "gorgeous," highlighting its "sketch-like art direction and the gritty / grimy texturedness." Writing for The Escapist, Matthew Razak similarly praised the trailer and noted the Turtles' more youthful nature compared to previous portrayals, commenting, "These Teenage Mutant Ninja Turtles actually sound and look like teenagers."

Extended footage from the film was shown at CinemaCon on April 27, 2023. An official full-length trailer was released on May 31, 2023. Gizmodo's James Whitbrook called it "absolutely stunning visually" and appreciated that the trailer gave "a little more downtime with the Turtles and their yearning for a life a little more normal than the one provided by being a mutant ninja teen." The Teenage Mutant Ninja Turtles: Mutant Mayhem Experience ran from July 23 to August 1, 2023 in New York City and Los Angeles and allowed guests to explore the Turtles underground sewer lair.

=== Streaming and home media ===
Teenage Mutant Ninja Turtles: Mutant Mayhem was released for digital download by Paramount Home Entertainment on September 1, 2023, and began streaming on Paramount+ on September 19. It was released on Ultra HD Blu-ray, Blu-ray, and DVD on December 12, 2023. The physical and digital releases included three behind-the-scenes featurettes and a tutorial video on how to draw Leonardo.

== Reception ==
=== Box office ===
Teenage Mutant Ninja Turtles: Mutant Mayhem grossed $118 million in the United States and Canada, and $63.2 million in other territories, for a worldwide total of $182 million. Deadline Hollywood calculated the film's net profit as $204.5 million, accounting for production budgets, marketing, and other costs; box office grosses, merchandise, television and streaming, and home media revenues placing it fourth on their list of 2023's "Most Valuable Blockbusters".

In the United States and Canada, Mutant Mayhem was projected to gross around $30 million from 3,851 theaters in its five-day opening weekend. The film made $10.2 million on its first day (including $3.85 million from Tuesday night previews). It went on to make $28 million in its opening weekend (and a total of $43 million over the five days), finishing fourth behind Barbie, Meg 2: The Trench, and Oppenheimer. The film made $15.7 million and $8.4 million in its second and third weekends, finishing in third and fourth, respectively. According to The Hollywood Reporter, the SAG-AFTRA strike, and Rogen and the cast's resulting inability to promote the film, potentially impacted its box office earnings by 15%. Industry insiders speculated that the film might have experienced a setback of $7–10 million. In China, the film bombed, making $310,000 over its three-day opening weekend and finishing ninth.

=== Critical response ===
Teenage Mutant Ninja Turtles: Mutant Mayhem received positive reviews from critics. The film's performances, screenplay, and stylized animation were praised, and several critics considered it the best Turtles film.

On the review aggregator website Rotten Tomatoes, 95% of 251 critics' reviews are positive, with an average rating of 7.6/10. The website's consensus reads: "With its unique visual style and a story that captures the essence of the franchise's appeal, Teenage Mutant Ninja Turtles: Mutant Mayhem is an animated treat for the whole family." Metacritic, which uses a weighted average, assigned the film a score of 74 out of 100, based on 47 critics, indicating "generally favorable" reviews. Audiences surveyed by CinemaScore gave the film an average grade of "A" on an A+ to F scale, while those polled at PostTrak gave it an 88% overall positive score, with 70% saying they would definitely recommend the film.

Lauding the film, Justin Chang of the Los Angeles Times called it "an unexpectedly delightful challenge to the critic's reflexive antifranchise mentality". Tom Jorgensen of IGN who gave the film an 8 out of 10 rating, spoke positively of it, though criticized the plot for being predictable. He wrote that the film "oozes confidence, energy, and heart" and represents "a new high for the Turtles on the big screen". Charlotte O'Sullivan of the Evening Standard, who awarded the feature 4 out of 5 stars, praised the portrayal of April O'Neil as well as Edeberi's performance of the character. She said that the film was "peppy, anarchic, doesn't talk down to teens, looks scrumdiddlyumptious, boasts an impeccably laconic soundtrack and gives us April O'Neil as we've never seen her before". Empire's John Nugent summarized in his 4 out 5 star rating review: "Inventively animated, giddily funny, and a surprisingly authentic take on the outsider experience: it is virtually impossible not to be charmed by these reptilian bros".

/Film's Rafael Motomayor gave the film a 9 out of 10 rating, saying that it "is not only a great introduction to the iconic franchise, but a fantastic film in its own right, and one of the best-looking movies of the year". Liz Miller of Consequence, who gave the film an A− grade, commended the use of licensed tracks, writing that the montage set to Blackstreet's "No Diggity" "might be one of the most beautifully animated sequences of the year so far". Deadline Hollywood's Pete Hammond applauded the screenplay, humor, and performances of Abbey, Brown, Cantu, and Noon. He concluded, "Rogen has made his mark on a franchise that still finds new ways to smartly entertain amid all that mayhem".

Brian Tallerico of RogerEbert.com, who gave the feature a 2.5 out of 4 star rating, considered the animation a highlight but criticized the story and characterization for lacking depth. Writing for Variety, Peter Debruge commended the direction but called the screenplay "wildly original in places" but a "recycled glob of tired clichés in others". The Daily Beast's Nick Schager praised the direction and animation but largely disliked the film for its humor, use of references, and story. He wrote, "Considering Rogen's participation as both a writer and actor, it's surprising that Mutant Mayhem plays it so safe, not merely in terms of plot but with regards to its comedy."

=== Accolades ===
Accolades received by Teenage Mutant Ninja Turtles: Mutant Mayhem
Award	Date of ceremony	Category	Recipient(s)	Result	Ref.
Heartland Film Festival	2023	Truly Moving Picture Award	Teenage Mutant Ninja Turtles: Mutant Mayhem	Won	
Hollywood Professional Association Awards	November 28, 2023	Outstanding Color Grading — Animated Theatrical Feature	Mitch Paulson (Company 3)	Nominated	
Boston Society of Film Critics Awards	December 10, 2023	Best Animated Film	Teenage Mutant Ninja Turtles: Mutant Mayhem	Runner-up (Note: Shared with Spider-Man: Across the Spider-Verse (2023), Robot Dreams (2023), and The Peasants (2023))	
Washington D.C. Area Film Critics Association Awards	December 10, 2023	Best Animated Feature	Teenage Mutant Ninja Turtles: Mutant Mayhem	Nominated	
Chicago Film Critics Association Awards	December 12, 2023	Best Animated Feature	Teenage Mutant Ninja Turtles: Mutant Mayhem	Nominated	
St. Louis Film Critics Association Awards	December 17, 2023	Best Animated Film	Teenage Mutant Ninja Turtles: Mutant Mayhem	Nominated	
Florida Film Critics Circle Awards	December 21, 2023	Best Animated Film	Teenage Mutant Ninja Turtles: Mutant Mayhem	Nominated	
AWFJ EDA Awards	January 3, 2024	Best Animated Film	Teenage Mutant Ninja Turtles: Mutant Mayhem	Nominated	
AWFJ EDA Awards	January 3, 2024	Best Animated Female	Ayo Edebiri	Nominated	
Georgia Film Critics Association Awards	January 5, 2024	Best Animated Film	Teenage Mutant Ninja Turtles: Mutant Mayhem	Nominated	
Astra Film and Creative Arts Awards	January 6, 2024	Best Animated Feature	Teenage Mutant Ninja Turtles: Mutant Mayhem	Nominated	
Seattle Film Critics Society Awards	January 8, 2024	Best Animated Feature	Teenage Mutant Ninja Turtles: Mutant Mayhem	Nominated	
Austin Film Critics Association Awards	January 10, 2024	Best Animated Film	Teenage Mutant Ninja Turtles: Mutant Mayhem	Nominated	
Austin Film Critics Association Awards	January 10, 2024	Best Voice Acting/Animated/Digital Performance	Ayo Edebiri	Nominated	
Austin Film Critics Association Awards	January 10, 2024	The Robert R. "Bobby" McCurdy Memorial Breakthrough Artist Award	Ayo Edebiri	Nominated	
Critics' Choice Movie Awards	January 14, 2024	Best Animated Feature	Teenage Mutant Ninja Turtles: Mutant Mayhem	Nominated	
Black Reel Awards	January 16, 2024	Outstanding Voice Performance	Ayo Edebiri	Nominated	
Houston Film Critics Society Awards	January 22, 2024	Best Animated Film	Teenage Mutant Ninja Turtles: Mutant Mayhem	Nominated	
Kansas City Film Critics Circle	January 27, 2024	Best Animated Feature	Teenage Mutant Ninja Turtles: Mutant Mayhem	Runner-up	
London Film Critics' Circle Awards	February 4, 2024	Animated Film of the Year	Teenage Mutant Ninja Turtles: Mutant Mayhem	Nominated	
Saturn Awards	February 4, 2024	Best Animated Film	Teenage Mutant Ninja Turtles: Mutant Mayhem	Nominated	
ADG Excellence in Production Design Awards	February 10, 2024	Excellence in Production Design for an Animated Film	Yashar Kassai	Nominated	
Annie Awards	February 17, 2024	Best Animated Feature	Teenage Mutant Ninja Turtles: Mutant Mayhem	Nominated	
Annie Awards	February 17, 2024	Outstanding Achievement for Directing in a Feature Production	Jeff Rowe, Kyler Spears	Nominated	
Annie Awards	February 17, 2024	Outstanding Achievement for Writing in a Feature Production	Seth Rogen, Evan Goldberg, Jeff Rowe, Dan Hernandez and Benji Samit	Nominated	
Annie Awards	February 17, 2024	Outstanding Achievement for Music in a Feature Production	Trent Reznor, Atticus Ross	Nominated	
Annie Awards	February 17, 2024	Outstanding Achievement for Production Design in an Animated Feature Production	Yashar Kassai, Arthur Fong, Tiffany Lam	Nominated	
Annie Awards	February 17, 2024	Outstanding Achievement for Editorial in a Feature Production	Greg Levitan, Illya Quinteros, David Croomes, Myra Owyang	Nominated	
Visual Effects Society Awards	February 21, 2024	Outstanding Visual Effects in an Animated Feature	Matthieu Rouxel, Marie Balland, Jacques Daigle, Vincent Leroy	Nominated	
Visual Effects Society Awards	February 21, 2024	Outstanding Animated Character in an Animated Feature	Gregory Coelho, Anne-Claire Leroux, Simon Cuisinier, Olivier Pierre (for Superfly)	Nominated	
Visual Effects Society Awards	February 21, 2024	Outstanding Created Environment in an Animated Feature	Olivier Mitonneau, Eddy Frechou, Guillaume Chevet, Arnaud Philippe-Giraux (for Midtown Manhattan)	Nominated	
Visual Effects Society Awards	February 21, 2024	Outstanding Effects Simulations in an Animated Feature	Louis Marsaud, Paul-Etienne Bourde, Serge Martin, Marine Pommereul	Nominated	
Producers Guild of America Awards	February 25, 2024	Outstanding Producer of Animated Theatrical Motion Pictures	Teenage Mutant Ninja Turtles: Mutant Mayhem	Nominated	
Cinema Audio Society Awards	March 2, 2024	Outstanding Achievement in Sound Mixing for Motion Picture – Animated	Doc Kane, Michael Semanick, Mark Mangini, Trent Reznor, Atticus Ross, Chris Cirino, Chelsea Body	Nominated	
ACE Eddie Awards	March 3, 2024	Best Edited Animated Feature Film (Theatrical or Non-Theatrical)	Greg Levitan	Nominated	
Satellite Awards	March 3, 2024	Best Animated or Mixed Media Feature	Teenage Mutant Ninja Turtles: Mutant Mayhem	Nominated	
Artios Awards	March 7, 2024	Outstanding Achievement in Casting – Feature Animation	Rich Delia, Adam Richards	Nominated	
ICG Publicists Awards	March 8, 2024	Maxwell Weinberg Award for Motion Picture Publicity Campaign	Teenage Mutant Ninja Turtles: Mutant Mayhem	Nominated	
NAACP Image Awards	March 16, 2024	Outstanding Animated Motion Picture	Teenage Mutant Ninja Turtles: Mutant Mayhem	Nominated	
Critics' Choice Super Awards	April 4, 2024	Best Superhero Movie	Teenage Mutant Ninja Turtles: Mutant Mayhem	Nominated	
Critics' Choice Super Awards	April 4, 2024	Best Actress in a Superhero Movie	Ayo Edebiri	Nominated	
Nickelodeon Kids' Choice Awards	July 13, 2024	Favorite Animated Movie	Teenage Mutant Ninja Turtles: Mutant Mayhem	Nominated	
Nickelodeon Kids' Choice Awards	July 13, 2024	Favorite Male Voice from an Animated Movie	Brady Noon	Nominated	
Nickelodeon Kids' Choice Awards	July 13, 2024	Favorite Male Voice from an Animated Movie	Jackie Chan	Nominated	
Nickelodeon Kids' Choice Awards	July 13, 2024	Favorite Female Voice from an Animated Movie	Ayo Edebiri	Nominated	

== Future ==
=== Sequel ===
In July 2023, a month before the film's release, it was announced that a sequel had been greenlit. It will feature the Shredder as the main antagonist who was teased at the end of Mutant Mayhem. Rowe is set to return as director alongside co-directors Spears and Kassai. Point Grey is set to co-produce again with Rogen, Goldberg, Weaver, Josh Fagen, and Ramsay McBean as producers. The film was originally set to release in theaters on October 9, 2026, but it was later pushed back to September 17, 2027, before being moved up to August 13, 2027. In December 2025, Rogen and Point Grey Pictures were in discussions with Paramount Skydance to produce a third film in the series.

=== Short film ===
In May 2025, it was reported that an animated short film, Chrome Alone 2 – Lost in New Jersey would debut at the Annecy International Animation Film Festival in June 2025. Set in the universe of Mutant Mayhem, the short was directed by Kent Seki, who served as head of cinematography on the 2023 feature film, and written by Andrew Joustra, who served as the script and recording coordinator on the feature. It was released in theaters on December 19, 2025, along with screenings of The SpongeBob Movie: Search for SquarePants.

=== Television series ===
Alongside the film sequel announcement in July 2023, a two-season 2D animated television series follow-up for Paramount+ was announced. The series, titled Tales of the Teenage Mutant Ninja Turtles, was reported to act as a bridge between Mutant Mayhem and the film sequel. Christopher Yost and Alan Wan were announced as executive producers and showrunners, respectively. It is a co-production between Nickelodeon Animation and Point Grey. It debuted on Paramount+ on August 9, 2024, and concluded in December 12, 2025 after being cancelled.

=== Video game ===
In September 2023, it was reported that a video game set in the universe of the film would release in 2024. The game, Teenage Mutant Ninja Turtles: Mutants Unleashed, is a 3D beat 'em up platformer developed by A Heartful of Games and published by Outright Games. It was released for the Nintendo Switch, PlayStation 4, PlayStation 5, Xbox One, Xbox Series X/S, and Microsoft Windows on October 18, 2024.
