= Hannibal Buress =

American comedian (born 1983)

- Buress in 2019
- Born: Hannibal Amir Buress; February 4, 1983 (age 43); Chicago, Illinois, U.S.
- Children: 1

Comedy career
- Years active: 2002–present
- Medium: Stand-up; film; television
- Genres: Observational comedy; black comedy; blue comedy; satire; surreal humour
- Subjects: African-American culture; American politics; current events; everyday life; human sexuality; popular culture; race relations; racism; food; religion; self-deprecation; the streets
- Website: hannibalburess.com

Hannibal Amir Buress (/ˈbʌrɪs/ BURR-iss; born February 4, 1983) is an American comedian, actor, producer, writer, musician, and venue owner. He started performing comedy in 2002 while attending Southern Illinois University. He starred on Adult Swim's The Eric Andre Show from 2012 to 2020, and was featured on Comedy Central's Broad City from 2014 to 2019. He is also known for his October 16, 2014 stand-up routine, which brought the sexual assault allegations against Bill Cosby to public attention and outcry, for which he was lauded.

== Early life ==
Hannibal Amir Buress was born in Chicago, Illinois, on February 4, 1983, the son of Margaret Buress, a teacher, and John Buress, a Union Pacific Railroad employee. He was raised in the Austin neighborhood of Chicago. He was named after Carthaginian general Hannibal, and has told stories in his stand-up act about his name causing women to turn him down because of its association with fictional cannibal Hannibal Lecter. After attending Steinmetz College Prep, he attended Southern Illinois University Carbondale for four years but did not graduate. While there, he became friends with hip hop artist Open Mike Eagle.

== Career ==
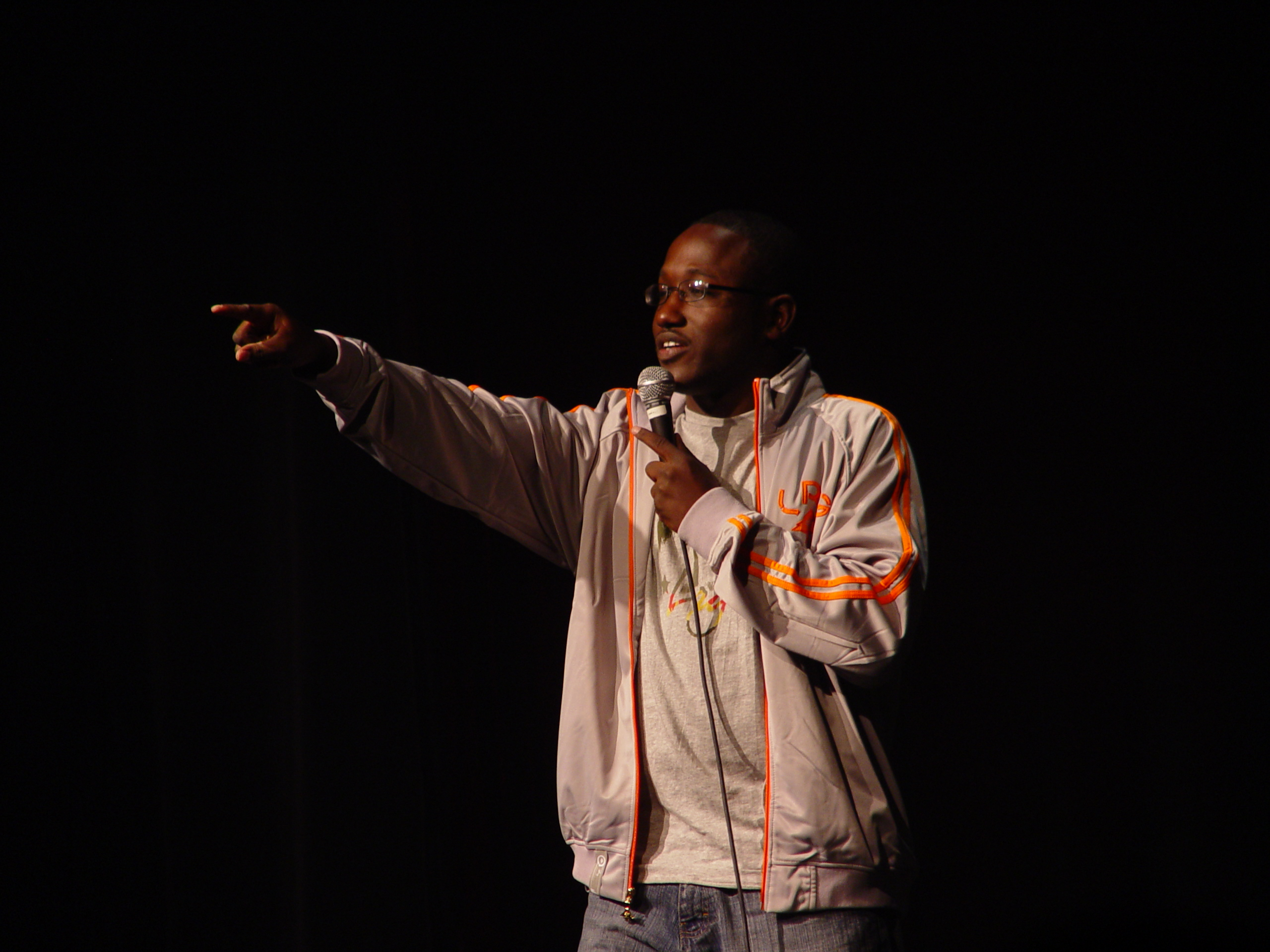
Buress performing in October 2007

Buress began his stand-up career at an open mic in 2002. He has been featured in The Awkward Comedy Show special on Comedy Central, and alongside comics Baron Vaughn, Eric André, Marina Franklin, and Victor Varnado, and on the FX sitcom Louie. From 2012 to 2020, he co-starred as Eric André's sidekick on The Eric Andre Show. In July 2010, Buress made Variety magazine's "Ten Comics to Watch in 2010" list.

His first stand-up comedy album, My Name is Hannibal, was released on July 27, 2010.

Buress was a writer on Saturday Night Live from 2009 to 2010. He left with only one of his sketches having aired. In September 2010, he began writing for the fifth season of the NBC comedy series 30 Rock. He left after six months, although he continued to portray various characters on the show for 9 episodes from 2010 to 2012, such as "Gus," "Homeless Guy," and "Bum."

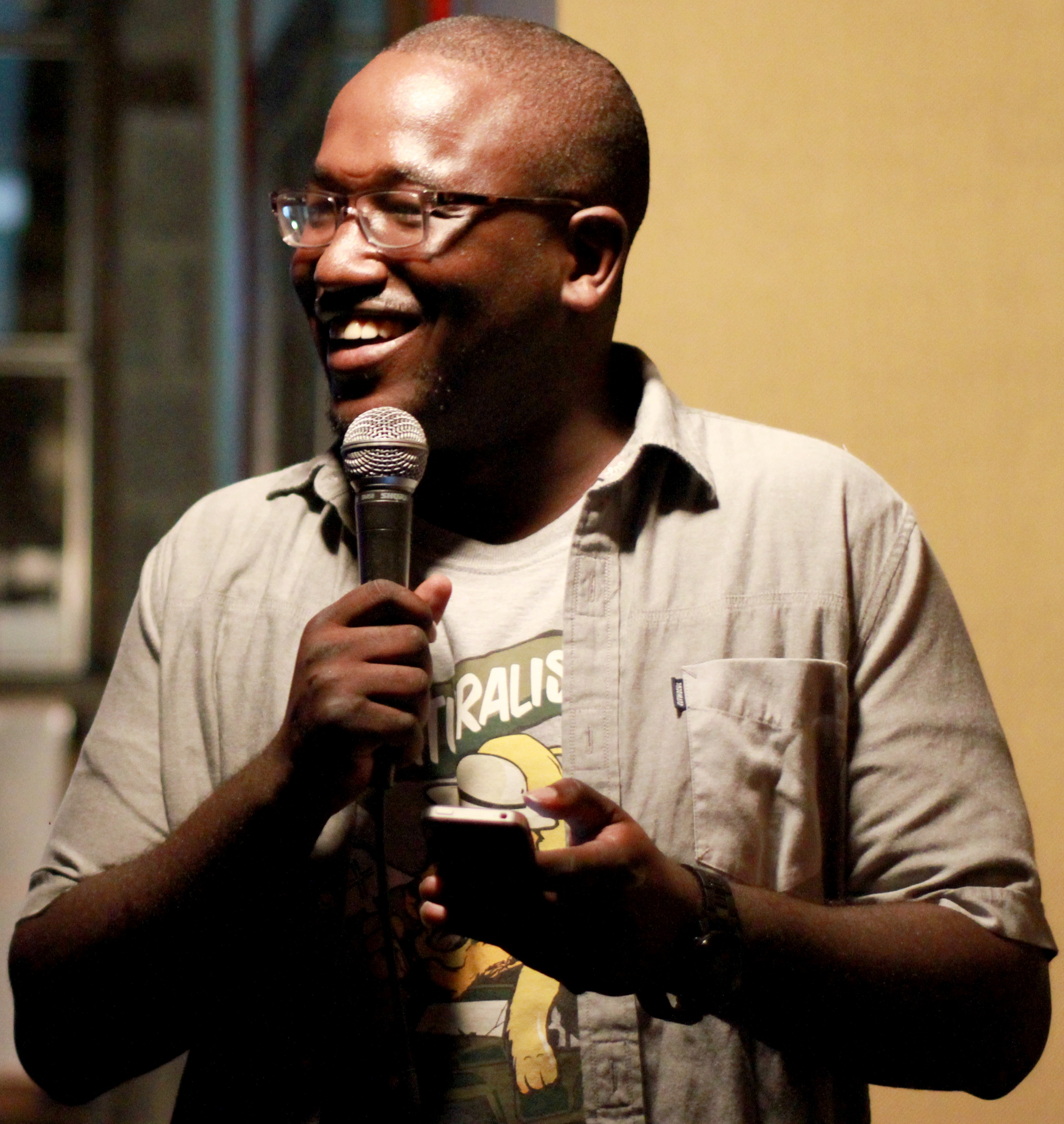
Buress in 2012

He released his second album, Animal Furnace, in 2012, which also aired as a special on Comedy Central. The album received positive reviews.

His stand-up comedy has been featured on Comedy Central programs such as Live at Gotham and John Oliver's New York Stand-Up Show. He has also performed on several late night talkshows such as The Late Late Show with Craig Ferguson, Lopez Tonight, Russell Howard's Good News, Late Night with Jimmy Fallon, The Tonight Show Starring Jimmy Fallon, Late Show with David Letterman, Jimmy Kimmel Live!, Totally Biased with W. Kamau Bell, and Conan. Additionally, he performed a set at the 2012 Secret Policeman's Ball at Radio City Music Hall in New York City.

He makes multiple cameos on the Grand Theft Auto V radio station FlyLo FM.

An hourlong Comedy Central show, Hannibal Buress Live from Chicago, aired on March 29, 2014.

He used to host a weekly stand-up comedy show at The Knitting Factory on Sunday evenings in Brooklyn, New York. In October 2016, Buress began a podcast called Handsome Rambler.

Buress played Coach Wilson in the 2017 Marvel film Spider-Man: Homecoming. Buress paid a lookalike who did not look like him to attend the film's premiere in his place, because he was busy with the film Tag. He got in contact with the lookalike when he did a video for the MTV Movie Awards.

On February 8, 2020, he appeared on The Bob Ross Challenge, painting for the first time, coming up with the art nickname 7.

He had a comedy special for Cornell University via Zoom on April 17 at 9 pm exclusive to the students.

Buress was one of many collaborators on Foam and Flotsam, a comedy album by Chelsea Peretti about coffee. The EP was released on April 21, 2020.

On April 30, 2020, he released a single called Judge Judy, paying homage to the series of the same name after it was announced that the show would end in 2021.

In 2025, Buress announced he would be opening a new performance venue, taking over what was formerly The Knitting Factory, which reportedly closed in the wake of a 75% increase in rent. The venue had its grand opening in early March and is named Isola Brooklyn for Isola, Mississippi, where Buress' maternal family is from. In September, Buress was included in a line-up of comedians slated to perform in the Riyadh Comedy Festival, an event hosted in Riyadh, the capital city of Saudi Arabia. The festival was criticized by Human Rights Watch, which characterized the event as an attempt by the Saudi government to whitewash its human rights abuses.

=== Bill Cosby routine ===
On October 16, 2014, at the Philadelphia club The Trocadero, Buress was recorded doing an extended routine about sexual assault allegations against comedian Bill Cosby. Buress addressed Cosby's legacy of "talk[ing] down" to young black men about their style of dress and lifestyle. Buress criticized the actor's public moralizing by saying, "Yeah, but you raped women, Bill Cosby, so that kind of brings you down a couple notches." When the audience responded to Buress's accusation with incredulity (Philadelphia being Cosby's home town), he encouraged everyone to search for "Bill Cosby rape" on Google when they got home.

Buress had been doing the same Cosby routine for the previous six months with little response, but the October performance went viral after being posted on the website of Philadelphia magazine. A media firestorm ensued, with numerous publications tackling the question of how Cosby had managed to maintain, as Buress called it in his set, a "Teflon image" despite more than a decade of public sexual abuse accusations.

Comedian Eddie Murphy later referenced Buress's role in the allegations coming to light while impersonating Cosby during his 2015 Mark Twain Prize for American Humor acceptance speech, mockingly playing Cosby as threatening Buress's life.

== Personal life ==
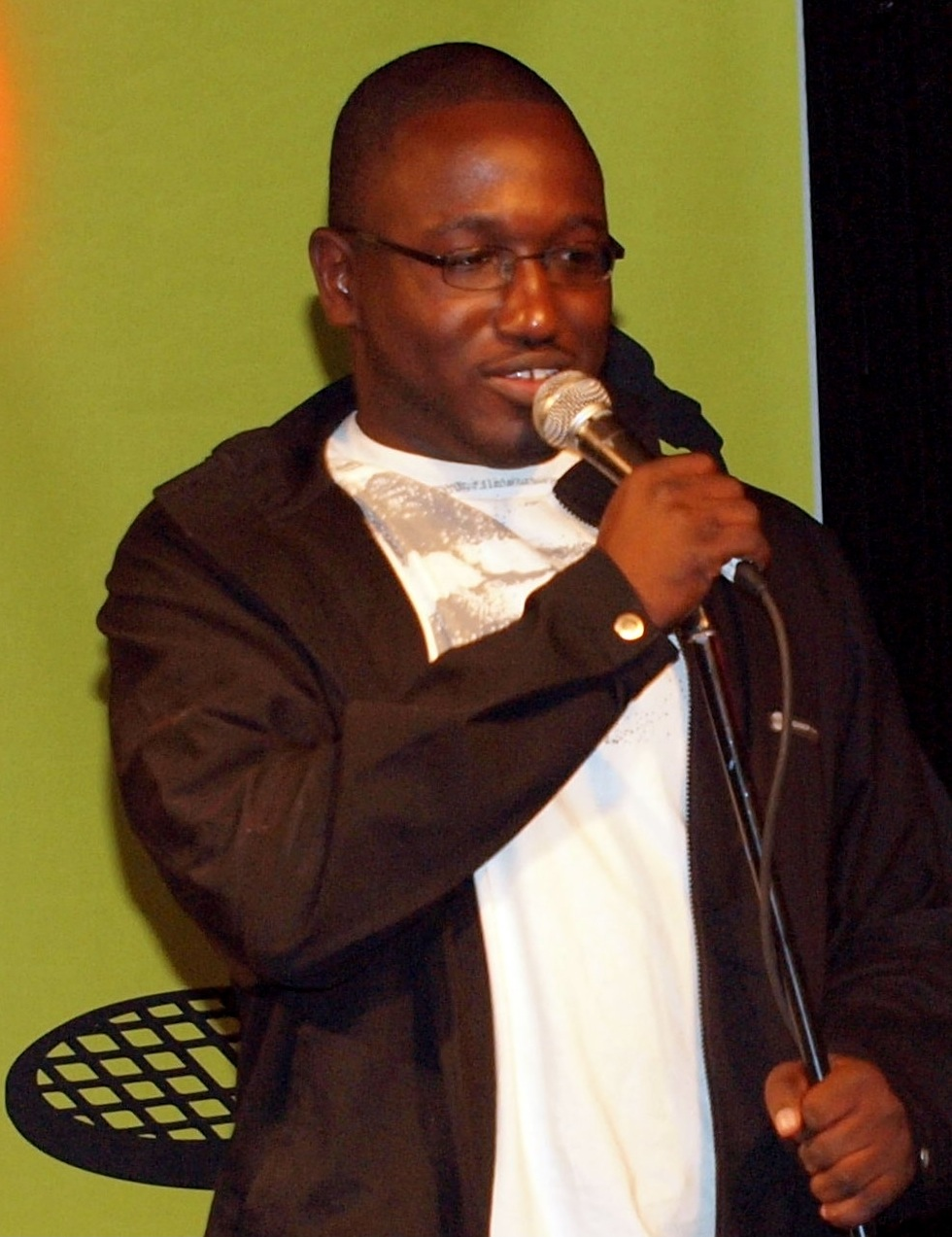
Buress performing in October 2009

After living in New York City, Buress moved back to his hometown of Chicago in 2017 and settled in its Wicker Park neighborhood. Buress is a fan of the Chicago White Sox.

In December 2017, Buress was arrested in Miami for disorderly intoxication. Bystander footage of the arrest showed Buress mocking the police officers and demanding to know why he was being arrested. The arrest report revealed that Buress was detained because he approached the police officers and would not stop asking them to call an Uber for him. Buress later stated, "I asked the [officer] to call me an Uber, and he said, 'No.' He told me to leave the street. I go into this bar to get a phone charger for an Uber. He follows me into the bar, and told me I'm too drunk to go inside. [...] 'If I can't be on the street, where do you want me to be?' I ask him. I was in a state of trying to get home. [...] I don't really believe I was at fault." The case was later dismissed. The Miami New Times reported that the arresting officer has an alleged history of violence and was previously disciplined by internal affairs for an alcohol-fueled assault. The report was included by Buress in a televised stand-up routine he did at the Olympia Theater in Miami, in August 2019. In July 2020, Buress brought a lawsuit against the City of Miami and the officers involved for constitutional violations in connection with the incident. The case was settled in 2025 for $200K according to the Miami New Times

Buress stated in a September 2018 interview that he had "quit drinking" after a number of "different situations [happened] that were alcohol fueled," such as "arguments," stating that the ways he had handled things "were not smooth, just messy shit."

Buress owns a building in Chicago; in 2017, he removed residential tenants in order to convert the property into Airbnb short-term rental units. In October 2019, he posted a tweet against Bernie Sanders's call for rent control and asked for donations to an Illinois landlords association, leading to Twitter users criticizing him with the phrase "Hannibal Buress is a landlord." Buress later stated that he regretted his now-deleted tweets, which he claimed were jokes meant to stir up controversy. He attributed the criticism he received to fallout over comments he made on Sanders's age. Buress also said a housing charity had refused his $4,000 donation due to his perceived landlord advocacy.

Buress is an atheist.

== Filmography ==
=== Film ===
Year	Title	Role	Notes
2011	Heart Break	Darryl	Short film
2012	Sleepwalk with Me	Hannibal	Uncredited
2013	The Kings of Summer	Bus Driver	
2013	Fester's Feast	Milk Man	
2014	Neighbors	Officer Watkins	
2014	The Begun of Tigtone	Seed Steed	Voice, short film
2014	Are You Joking?	Kenny	
2015	Band of Robbers	Ben Rogers	
2015	Daddy's Home	Griff	
2016	Nerdland	Nerd King	Voice
2016	Neighbors 2: Sorority Rising	Officer Watkins	
2016	The Angry Birds Movie	Edward the Birthday Dad	Voice
2016	The Nice Guys	Bumble	Voice
2016	Flock of Dudes	Pussypop	
2016	The Secret Life of Pets	Buddy	Voice
2016	The Comedian	Himself	
2017	Kuso	Kazu	
2017	The Disaster Artist	Bill Meurer	
2017	Baywatch	Dave the Tech	
2017	Spider-Man: Homecoming	Coach Wilson	
2018	Blockers	Frank	
2018	Tag	Kevin Sable	
2018	Slice	Hannibal	
2019	The Secret Life of Pets 2	Buddy	Voice
2021	Spider-Man: No Way Home	Coach Wilson	
2023	Teenage Mutant Ninja Turtles: Mutant Mayhem	Genghis Frog	Voice
TBA	Thumb	TBA	Post-production

=== Television ===
Year	Title	Role	Notes
2009–2010	Saturday Night Live	Michael/Airplane Passenger	2 episodes
2010	Louie	Hannibal	2 episodes
2010	Delocated	Comedian #2	Episode: "Kim's Krafts"
2010–2012	30 Rock	Hannibal/Bum/Homeless Guy/Gus	9 episodes
2012	8 Out of 10 Cats	Himself (guest/contestant)	Series 13, Episode 2 (4 May 2012)
2012–2020	The Eric Andre Show	Himself (co-host)	Also writer and producer
2013	The Mindy Project	Derek	Episode: "Bunk Bed"
2013	Kroll Show	Basketball Player	Episode: "Dine & Dash"
2013	High Maintenance Web Series	Hannibal	Episode: "Jonathan"
2013	Bob's Burgers	Hefty Jeff	Voice, episode: "My Big Fat Greek Bob"
2013–2015	Lucas Bros. Moving Co.	Momma Lucas	Voice, 7 episodes
2013–2015	China, IL	Matt Attack/DJ Don Jose/Street Troll	Voice, 9 episodes
2014	Chozen	Crisco	Voice, 10 episodes
2014–2019	Broad City	Lincoln Rice	29 episodes
2015	The Comedy Central Roast of Justin Bieber	Himself	
2015	Why? with Hannibal Buress	Himself (host)	Also creator and executive producer
2015	The Jim Gaffigan Show	Himself	Episode: "Maria"
2016	Childrens Hospital	Himself	Episode: "Kids Hospital"
2016	Adventure Time	Flame Prince	Voice, episode: "Five Short Tables"
2016	Easy	Jason	Episode: "Hop Dreams"
2016–2017	High Maintenance	Comedian	2 episodes
2017	Justice League Action	Mr. Terrific	Voice, 2 episodes
2017	Crashing	Himself	Episode: "Barking"
2017	BoJack Horseman	Miles	Voice, episode: "The Judge"
2017	Most Expensivest	Himself	Episode: "High Rollers"
2020	Who Wants to Be a Millionaire?	Himself	2 episodes
2020	The Simpsons	Finch	Voice, episode: "The Road to Cincinnati"
2022	Ziwe	Himself	Episode: "Socially Liberal, Fiscally Conservative"
2023	What We Do in the Shadows	Hannibal	Episode: "The Campaign"
2025	Mo	Denato	Episode: "Field of Dreams"

=== Web series ===
Year	Title	Role	Notes
2018	Hot Ones	Himself	Episode: "Hannibal Buress Freestyles While Eating Spicy Wings"
2020	The Bob Ross Challenge (Mashable)	Himself	1 episode
2021	The Daily Bugle	Coach Wilson	1 episode

=== Video games ===
Year	Title	Role
2013	Grand Theft Auto V	Himself on the FlyLo FM radio station
2016	NBA 2K17	Ice

== Discography ==
=== Albums/comedy specials ===
- My Name Is Hannibal (2010)
- Animal Furnace (2012)
- Live from Chicago (2014)
- Comedy Camisado (2016)
- Hannibal Takes Edinburgh (2016)
- Miami Nights (2020)

=== Guest appearances ===
Title	Year	Artist(s)	Album
"A Slow Death"	2013	itsTheReal, DJ Drama	Urbane Outfitters, Vol. 1
"Doug Stamper (Advice Raps)"	2014	Open Mike Eagle	Dark Comedy
"Get It Together"	2015	Serengeti	Kenny Dennis Flexi
"Intro"	2015	Statik Selektah	Lucky 7
"Hannibal Interlude"	2015	Lil Dicky	Professional Rapper
"Nothin' But Love"	2015	BJ the Chicago Kid, Joey Badass	—N/a
"All the Way"	2016	Jeremih, Chance the Rapper, King Louie	Merry Christmas Lil' Mama
"The Moonlanding"	2017	The Cool Kids	Special Edition Grandmaster Deluxe
"OhSh"	2018	Jean Grae, Quelle Chris	Everything's Fine

=== Singles ===
- Judge Judy (2020)

== Awards and nominations ==
Year	Work	Award	Organization	Category	Result
2007	Stand-up routine	Chicago's Funniest Person	Time Out Chicago	Chicago-based contest	Won
2010	Saturday Night Live	Emmy Award	Academy of Television Arts & Sciences	Outstanding Writing for a Variety, Music or Comedy Series	Nominated
2011	Funny as Hell	Best Performance in a Hosted Stand-Up/Sketch Comedy Program or Series	Gemini Awards	Best Performance in a Hosted Stand-Up/Sketch Comedy Program or Series	Won
2012	30 Rock	Writers Guild of America Award	Writers Guild of America	Outstanding Achievement – Comedy Series	Nominated
2012	Stand-up routine	American Comedy Award	Comedy Central	Best Club Comic	Won
2014	The Eric Andre Show	Best Talk Show Host	Adult Swim	Best Talk Show Host	Won
2018	Tag	Teen Choice Awards	The Forum	Choice Movie: Fight	Nominated
