= Carla Gallo =

American actress

- Born: Carla Paolina Gallo; June 24, 1975 (age 51); Brooklyn, New York, U.S.
- Education: Cornell University
- Occupation: Actress
- Years active: 1994–present
- Spouse: Mark Satterthwaite (m. 2017)
- Children: 2

Carla Paolina Gallo (born June 24, 1975) is an American actress. Gallo has had recurring roles in the television series Undeclared, Carnivàle, Bones, Californication, and a number of film roles. Since her role on Undeclared, she has made frequent appearances in other Judd Apatow productions.

She graduated from Cornell University with a degree in Theater.

== Personal life ==
Gallo is of primarily German-American descent as well as Italian-American descent.

Her best friend since childhood is fellow actress Sarah Paulson.

Gallo announced she was six months pregnant with her first child, in April 2014, at the L.A. premiere of Neighbors. She gave birth to a daughter in the summer of 2014. She gave birth to her second daughter in May 2017. Her husband is screenwriter Mark Satterthwaite.

== Filmography ==
=== Film ===
Year	Title	Role	Notes
1994	Spanking the Monkey	Toni Peck	
2000	The Fanatical Teachings of Julian Tau	Bunnie Jeffrie	Short film
2002	The Gray in Between	Stephanie	
2005	Sexual Life	Terri	
2005	The 40-Year-Old Virgin	Toe-Sucking Girl	
2006	Mission: Impossible III	Beth	
2007	Superbad	Period Blood Girl (Jacinda)	
2008	Forgetting Sarah Marshall	Gag Me Girl	
2008	I Heart Veronica Martin	Darby Reynolds	Short film
2008	Insanitarium	Vera Downing	Video
2009	The Slammin' Salmon	Stacy	
2009	Funny People	Miss Pruitt	
2009	Mother and Child	Tracy	
2009	I Love You, Man	Zooey's Friend	
2010	Get Him to the Greek	Destiny	
2010	The Rooster	Stacy	Short film
2011	Perfect	Sara	Short film
2011	Coming & Going	Linda	
2011	We Bought a Zoo	Rhonda Blair	
2013	Beneath the Harvest Sky	Renee	
2014	Neighbors	Paula Faldt-Blevins	
2016	Neighbors 2: Sorority Rising	Paula Faldt-Blevins	
2017	Little Evil	Wendy	
2017	Room for Rent	Lindsay Ross	
2018	A Futile and Stupid Gesture	Lucy Fisher	
2020	Four Good Days	Ashley	
2020	Happiest Season	Angry Homeowner Lady	
2021	The Starling	Doctor Wilson	

=== Television ===
Year	Title	Role	Notes
1999	Law & Order	Janet Tuckman	Episode: "Hunters"
2000	ER	Emma Miller	Episode: "Flight of Fancy"
2001–2003	Undeclared	Lizzie Exley	Main role (18 episodes)
2003–2005	Carnivàle	Libby Dreifuss	Regular role (24 episodes)
2006	What About Brian	Brenda	Episode: "Sex, Lies and Videotape"
2007	Crossing Jordan	Marissa Owens	Episode: "Fall from Grace"
2007	House	Janie	Episode: "Act Your Age"
2008	NCIS	Melissa Wheeler Fox	Episode: "Silent Night"
2008–2009	Californication	Daisy	Recurring role (11 episodes)
2008–2017	Bones	Daisy Wick	Recurring role (33 episodes)
2009	Mad Men	Karen Ericson	Episodes: "The Arrangement", "The Grown-Ups"
2009–2011	Men of a Certain Age	Annie	Recurring role (8 episodes)
2011	Danni Lowinski	Kaz	TV film
2011	Outsourced	Debbie	Episode: "The Todd Couple"
2011	Traffic Light	Natasha	Episode: "All the President's Men"
2011	Five	Laura	TV film
2011	2 Broke Girls	Stephanie	Episode: "And the Pretty Problem"
2011	Burn Notice	Sherry	Episode: "Damned If You Do"
2011	Workaholics	Bunny Anderson	Episode: "Karl's Wedding"
2012	Key & Peele	Drunk Girl at the Bar	Episode: "Flicker"
2012	Franklin & Bash	Tammi Sutton	Episode: "Waiting on a Friend"
2012–2013	Burning Love	Tamara P.	Episodes: "1.8", "Meet Orlando & the Ladies", "Finale", "Dancing!"
2013	Childrens Hospital	Denise	Episode: "Country Weekend"
2013	Work It	Michelle	Episode: "Field of Schemes"
2013–2014	Blue	Rose	Recurring role (5 episodes)
2014	Anger Management	Shannon	Episode: "Charlie and His Probation Officer's Daughter"
2016	The Night Shift	Hannah	Episode: "Get Busy Livin'"
2016	Rosewood	Daisy Wick	Episode: "Half-Life & Havana Nights"
2017	Future Man	Dingo	2 episodes
2019	Sneaky Pete	Betsy	Episode: "The Double Up and Back"
2021	9-1-1: Lone Star	Vicki Nadler	Episode: "Everyone and Their Brother"
2022–2023	Mayans M.C.	Melissa Lyndecker	Guest role (3 episodes)
2023	Platonic	Katie	Regular role
2025	Chicago Fire	Pam Belfort	Episode: "Broken Things"

=== Video games ===
Year	Title	Role	Notes
2011	L.A. Noire	Gloria Bishop (voice)	
