= List of 2015 box office number-one films in Austria =

This is a list of films which placed number one at the weekend box office for the year 2015.

== Number-one films ==
| † | This implies the highest-grossing movie of the year. |

| # | Date | Film | Ref. |
|---|---|---|---|
| 1 | January 4, 2015 | The Hobbit: The Battle of the Five Armies | |
| 2 | January 11, 2015 | Taken 3 | |
| 3 | January 18, 2015 | Head Full of Honey | |
| 4 | January 25, 2015 | Big Hero 6 | |
| 5 | February 1, 2015 | Big Hero 6 | |
| 6 | February 8, 2015 | Big Hero 6 | |
| 7 | February 15, 2015 | Fifty Shades of Grey | |
| 8 | February 22, 2015 | Fifty Shades of Grey | |
| 9 | March 1, 2015 | Fifty Shades of Grey | |
| 10 | March 8, 2015 | Life Eternal | |
| 11 | March 15, 2015 | Life Eternal | |
| 12 | March 22, 2015 | Shaun the Sheep | |
| 13 | March 29, 2015 | The Manny | |
| 14 | April 5, 2015 | Furious 7 | |
| 15 | April 12, 2015 | Furious 7 | |
| 16 | April 19, 2015 | Furious 7 | |
| 17 | April 26, 2015 | Avengers: Age of Ultron | |
| 18 | May 3, 2015 | Avengers: Age of Ultron | |
| 19 | May 10, 2015 | Avengers: Age of Ultron | |
| 20 | May 17, 2015 | Pitch Perfect 2 | |
| 21 | May 24, 2015 | Pitch Perfect 2 | |
| 22 | May 31, 2015 | Poltergeist | |
| 23 | June 7, 2015 | Spy | |
| 24 | June 14, 2015 | Jurassic World | |
| 25 | June 21, 2015 | Jurassic World | |
| 26 | June 28, 2015 | Jurassic World | |
| 27 | July 5, 2015 | Minions † | |
| 28 | July 12, 2015 | Minions † | |
| 29 | July 19, 2015 | Minions † | |
| 30 | July 26, 2015 | Minions † | |
| 31 | August 2, 2015 | Minions † | |
| 32 | August 9, 2015 | Mission: Impossible – Rogue Nation | |
| 33 | August 16, 2015 | Mission: Impossible – Rogue Nation | |
| 34 | August 23, 2015 | Mission: Impossible – Rogue Nation | |
| 35 | August 30, 2015 | Hitman: Agent 47 | |
| 36 | September 6, 2015 | Minions † | |
| 37 | September 13, 2015 | Fack ju Göhte 2 | |
| 38 | September 20, 2015 | Fack ju Göhte 2 | |
| 39 | September 27, 2015 | Fack ju Göhte 2 | |
| 40 | October 4, 2015 | Inside Out | |
| 41 | October 11, 2015 | Inside Out | |
| 42 | October 18, 2015 | Hotel Transylvania 2 | |
| 43 | October 25, 2015 | Paranormal Activity: The Ghost Dimension | |
| 44 | November 1, 2015 | Look Who's Back | |
| 45 | November 8, 2015 | Spectre | |
| 46 | November 15, 2015 | Spectre | |
| 47 | November 22, 2015 | The Hunger Games: Mockingjay – Part 2 | |
| 48 | November 29, 2015 | The Hunger Games: Mockingjay – Part 2 | |
| 49 | December 6, 2015 | Krampus | |
| 50 | December 13, 2015 | The Hunger Games: Mockingjay – Part 2 | |
| 51 | December 20, 2015 | Star Wars: The Force Awakens | |
| 52 | December 27, 2015 | Star Wars: The Force Awakens | |

== Most successful films by box office admissions ==
Most successful films of 2015 by number of movie tickets sold in Austria.

| Rank | Title | Tickets sold | Country |
|---|---|---|---|
| 1. | Minions | 794,357 | United States |
| 2. | Spectre | 745,595 | United Kingdom, United States |
| 3. | Fack ju Göhte 2 | 630,955 | Germany |
| 4. | Fifty Shades of Grey | 600,051 | United States |
| 5. | Furious 7 | 548,414 | United States |
| 6. | Star Wars: The Force Awakens | 540,557 | United States |
| 7. | The Hunger Games: Mockingjay – Part 2 | 440,588 | United States, Germany |
| 8. | Jurassic World | 427,391 | United States |
| 9. | Inside Out | 362,378 | United States |
| 10. | Head Full of Honey | 348,066 | Germany |

== See also ==
- Cinema of Austria

| Preceded by 2014 | 2015 | Succeeded by 2016 |
