= List of 2019 box office number-one films in Austria =

This is a list of films which placed number one at the weekend box office for the year 2019.

== Number-one films ==
†	This implies the highest-grossing movie of the year.

#	Date	Film	Total weekend gross	Notes
1	January 6, 2019	Aquaman	N/A	
2	January 13, 2019	Aquaman	N/A	
3	January 20, 2019	Glass	N/A	
4	January 27, 2019	Ralph Breaks the Internet	N/A	
5	February 3, 2019	Ralph Breaks the Internet	N/A	
6	February 10, 2019	How to Train Your Dragon: The Hidden World	N/A	
7	February 17, 2019	How to Train Your Dragon: The Hidden World	N/A	
8	February 24, 2019	How to Train Your Dragon: The Hidden World	N/A	
9	March 3, 2019	Escape Room	N/A	
10	March 10, 2019	Captain Marvel	N/A	
11	March 17, 2019	Captain Marvel	N/A	
12	March 24, 2019	Captain Marvel	N/A	
13	March 31, 2019	Captain Marvel	N/A	
14	April 7, 2019	Serial (Bad) Weddings 2	N/A	
15	April 14, 2019	After	N/A	
16	April 21, 2019	Serial (Bad) Weddings 2	N/A	
17	April 28, 2019	Serial (Bad) Weddings 2	N/A	
18	May 5, 2019	Avengers: Endgame	N/A	
19	May 12, 2019	Avengers: Endgame	N/A	
20	May 19, 2019	Pokémon Detective Pikachu	N/A	
21	May 26, 2019	John Wick: Chapter 3 – Parabellum	N/A	
22	June 2, 2019	Aladdin	N/A	
23	June 9, 2019	Aladdin	€168,000	
24	June 16, 2019	Men in Black: International	€142,000	
25	June 23, 2019	Aladdin	€166,000	
26	June 30, 2019	The Secret Life of Pets 2	N/A	
27	July 7, 2019	Spider-Man: Far From Home	N/A	
28	July 14, 2019	Spider-Man: Far From Home	€445,000	
29	July 21, 2019	The Lion King †	€1,300,000	
30	July 28, 2019	The Lion King †	€1,170,000	
31	August 4, 2019	The Lion King †	€740,000	
32	August 11, 2019	The Lion King †	€369,000	
33	August 18, 2019	Once Upon a Time in Hollywood	€443,000	
34	August 25, 2019	Once Upon a Time in Hollywood	€312,000	
35	September 1, 2019	Once Upon a Time in Hollywood	€172,000	
36	September 8, 2019	It Chapter Two	€962,000	
37	September 15, 2019	It Chapter Two	€395,000	
38	September 22, 2019	It Chapter Two	€197,348	
39	September 29, 2019	Rambo: Last Blood	€145.000	
40	October 6, 2019	Gemini Man	€205,000	
41	October 13, 2019	Joker	€1,046,000	
42	October 20, 2019	Joker	€901,000	
43	October 27, 2019	Joker	€557,000	
44	November 3, 2019	Das perfekte Geheimnis	€897,937	
45	November 10, 2019	Das perfekte Geheimnis	€687,000	
46	November 17, 2019	Das perfekte Geheimnis	€503,000	
47	November 24, 2019	Frozen 2	€1,260,000	
48	December 1, 2019	Frozen 2	€923,000	
49	December 8, 2019	Frozen 2	€639,000	
50	December 15, 2019	Jumanji: The Next Level	€537,000	
51	December 22, 2019	Star Wars: The Rise of Skywalker	€1,261,811	
52	December 29, 2019	Star Wars: The Rise of Skywalker	€874,347	

== Highest-grossing films ==
Highest-grossing films of 2019
Rank	Title	Domestic gross
1.	The Lion King	€8,160,000
2.	Avengers: Endgame	€7,010,000
3.	Joker	€5,300,000
4.	Frozen 2	€4,150,000
5.	Das perfekte Geheimnis	€4,000,000

== Most successful films by box office admissions ==
Most successful films of 2019 by number of movie tickets sold in Austria.

Rank	Title	Tickets sold	Country
1.	The Lion King	837.348	United States
2.	Frozen 2	653.468	United States
3.	Avengers: Endgame	611.635	United States
4.	Joker	545.085	United States
5.	Das perfekte Geheimnis	474.555	Germany
6.	Bohemian Rhapsody	408.189	United Kingdom, United States
7.	Fantastic Beasts: The Crimes of Grindelwald	357.157	United States, United Kingdom
8.	The Grinch	356.460	United States
9.	Star Wars: The Rise of Skywalker	314.190	United States
10.	The Secret Life of Pets 2	307.995	United States

== See also ==
- Cinema of Austria

Preceded by 2018	2019	Succeeded by 2020
