= Andrew J. Cohen =

American writer and director

- Born: Andrew Jay Cohen; Scarsdale, New York, U.S.
- Occupations: Screenwriter, film director
- Years active: 2014–present

Andrew J. Cohen is an American screenwriter and film director, best known for writing the 2014 film Neighbors along with Brendan O'Brien. His feature-length directorial debut, The House, was released on June 30, 2017.

== Early life and education ==
Cohen and his screenwriter friend Brendan O'Brien were both born and grew up in Scarsdale, New York, and both went to Scarsdale Middle School, where they became friends in the sixth grade. Cohen graduated in film studies from Yale University.

== Career ==
In 2014, Cohen co-wrote the script for the comedy film Neighbors along with O'Brien, starring Zac Efron and Seth Rogen. The film was directed by Nicholas Stoller and released on May 9, 2014.

Cohen and O'Brien also co-wrote the scripts for two 2016 films, Neighbors 2: Sorority Rising and Mike and Dave Need Wedding Dates.

Cohen made his directing debut with the 2017 comedy film The House, which he co-wrote with O'Brien.

== Filmography ==
Year	Title	Director	Writer	Producer
2014	Neighbors	No	Yes	Executive
2016	Neighbors 2: Sorority Rising	No	Yes	Executive
2016	Mike and Dave Need Wedding Dates	No	Yes	Executive
2017	The House	Yes	Yes	Yes
