= The House (2017 film) =

2017 American comedy film

- Theatrical release poster
- Directed by: Andrew Jay Cohen
- Written by: Brendan O'Brien; Andrew Jay Cohen
- Produced by: Brendan O'Brien; Andrew Jay Cohen; Joe Drake; Jessica Elbaum; Nathan Kahane; Will Ferrell; Adam McKay
- Starring: Will Ferrell; Amy Poehler; Jason Mantzoukas; Nick Kroll; Jeremy Renner
- Cinematography: Jas Shelton
- Edited by: Evan Henke; Mike Sale
- Music by: Andrew Feltenstein; John Nau
- Production companies: New Line Cinema; Village Roadshow Pictures; Gary Sanchez Productions; Good Universe
- Distributed by: Warner Bros. Pictures
- Release dates: June 30, 2017 (TCL Chinese Theatre); June 30, 2017 (United States)
- Running time: 88 minutes
- Country: United States
- Language: English
- Budget: $40 million
- Box office: $34.2 million

The House is a 2017 American comedy film directed by Andrew J. Cohen, and co-written by Cohen and Brendan O'Brien. The film stars Will Ferrell, Amy Poehler, Jason Mantzoukas, Ryan Simpkins, Nick Kroll, Allison Tolman, Rob Huebel, Michaela Watkins, and Jeremy Renner.

The plot follows the Johansens, a couple who open an underground casino in their friend Frank's house in order to pay for their daughter Alex's college tuition.

Principal photography began on September 14, 2015, in Los Angeles. The film was released on June 30, 2017, by Warner Bros. Pictures, received negative reviews from critics and flopped at the box office, grossing $34.2 million worldwide against its $40 million budget.

== Plot ==
During their visit to Bucknell University, husband and wife Scott and Kate Johansen warn their daughter of the dangers of being in college. Alex acknowledges her parents' warnings and expresses her interest in attending the same university her parents went to. Alex gets accepted to the university, which the Johansens expect to be funded by their community's scholarship program.

Unfortunately, during a community town hall meeting, city councilor Bob Schaeffer announces that they will not be doing the scholarship program, in favor of building a community pool, to which everyone agrees except the Johansens. The couple tries to find funding through asking for a loan, a salary raise for Scott, and getting Kate's job back, but everything is denied.

The Johansens reluctantly agree to accompany their friend and neighbor, Frank Theodorakis, whose wife Raina is divorcing him over his gambling and porn addiction, to a previously planned trip to Las Vegas. After numerous wins playing craps, they lose their winnings after Scott jinxes the table by telling Frank not to roll a seven.

Back home, Frank convinces the Johansens to start an underground casino at his house to raise money for Alex's tuition and to help him get his wife back. The casino operation proves to be running smoothly as they gain more customers. In another community town-hall meeting, Bob becomes suspicious at the low attendance and suspends the meeting to launch an investigation.

Back at the Johansens' casino, Frank discovers that one of the gamblers, Carl, is counting cards. The Johansens and Frank confront him, but he brags that he works for mob boss Tommy Papouli. Scott accidentally chops off Carl's middle finger, earning him the nickname "The Butcher", making the community afraid of him and inadvertently increasing their profits.

Several thousand dollars away from reaching their goal, they are caught by Bob and Officer Chandler, who confiscate their money and order them to close down the casino. Nonetheless, they continue their business. The house burns down after being invaded by Papouli, whom the Johansens set on fire.

Having admitted their plot to Alex, they team up with Chandler, who had let them loose, to steal the money back from Bob. Chandler convinces Bob that the three continued the casino even after he had ordered them to stop, and shows a video of the people mocking him. Bob asks Chandler to go with him to arrest the Johansens at the casino, which gives the Johansens the chance to steal their money back.

Dawn Mayweather, the town treasurer, alerts Bob that the Johansens are in the town hall, which convinces him to return. He tries to make Chandler drive faster, but causes an accident himself. Bob runs back to the town hall on foot to find the Johansens with the money.

After chasing the Johansens, Bob reveals his personal interest with the casino money as well as his plot to steal money from the city budget for himself and Dawn, who leaves him and returns to her husband Joe. Bob is arrested, while Scott and Kate use the money they took back from him to pay for their daughter's college tuition.

== Cast ==
- Will Ferrell as Scott Johansen
- Amy Poehler as Kate Johansen, Scott's wife
- Jason Mantzoukas as Frank Theodorakis, Kate and Scott's best friend
- Ryan Simpkins as Alex Johansen, Scott and Kate's daughter
- Nick Kroll as Bob Schaeffer, a crooked City Hall councilman
- Allison Tolman as Dawn Mayweather, the city's treasurer and Joe's wife
- Rob Huebel as Police Officer Chandler
- Michaela Watkins as Raina Theodorakis, Frank's ex-wife
- Jeremy Renner as Tommy Papouli, a local mafia boss
- Cedric Yarbrough as Reggie Henderson
- Rory Scovel as Joe Mayweather, Dawn's husband who retired at 30
- Lennon Parham as Martha
- Andrea Savage as Laura
- Andy Buckley as Craig
- Natasha Kojic as Super model (as Natasha Key)
- Kyle Kinane as Kevin Garvey
- Steve Zissis as Carl Shackler, a henchman of Tommy Papouli
- Sam Richardson as Marty
- Randall Park as Buckler
- Jessica St. Clair as Reba
- Alexandra Daddario as Corsica
- Jessie Ennis as Rachel
- Gillian Vigman as Becky
- Wayne Federman as Chip Dave
- Sebastian Maniscalco as Stand-Up Comic
- Linda Porter as Old Lady
- Ian Roberts as Driver at college campus

== Production ==
On February 25, 2015, it was announced that New Line Cinema had won an auction for the comedy script The House, written by Brendan O'Brien and Andrew J. Cohen, and that Cohen would make his directorial debut with the film. Will Ferrell would star as a husband who teams up with his wife and neighbors to start an illegal casino in his basement, to earn money after their daughter's college scholarship is lost. Ferrell and Adam McKay produced through Gary Sanchez Productions, along with Good Universe and O'Brien. Amy Poehler joined the cast on June 12, 2015, to play Ferrell's character's wife. On June 16, 2015, Jason Mantzoukas joined to play Ferrell's character's best friend, who is dealing with a gambling problem, and who gives the couple the idea to start a casino. On August 28, 2015, Ryan Simpkins was added to the cast, to play Ferrell and Poehler's daughter. On September 15, 2015, Cedric Yarbrough signed on to play Reggie Henderson, a hardworking suburban resident who starts gambling in the new casino to de-stress. Frank Gerrish also joined the film. On September 18, 2015, Rob Huebel was added to the cast, and on September 21, 2015, Allison Tolman and Michaela Watkins were added to the cast, with Tolman playing a financial advisor, and Watkins playing Mantzoukas' character's wife, who wants him to sign divorce papers. Nick Kroll also joined the cast. Mariah Carey was supposed to have a cameo in the film, but had what co-star Rob Huebel called "multiple unrealistic demands".

Principal photography on the film began on September 14, 2015, in Los Angeles.

== Release ==
The House was released on June 30, 2017, by Warner Bros. Pictures. The original release date was June 2, 2017.

=== Box office ===
The House grossed $25.6 million in the United States and Canada, and $8.6 million in other territories, for a worldwide total of $34.2 million, against a production budget of $40 million.

In North America, The House opened alongside Despicable Me 3 and Baby Driver, as well as the wide expansion of The Beguiled, and was projected to gross $10–14 million from 3,134 theaters in its opening weekend. The film made $3.4 million on its first day (including $800,000 from Thursday night previews). It went on to open to $8.7 million, marking the lowest studio debut of Ferrell's career as a lead actor. In its second weekend, the film made $4.8 million (a drop of 45.2%), finishing 7th at the box office.

=== Critical response ===
On review aggregator Rotten Tomatoes, the film has a rating of 20% based on 80 reviews, with an average rating of 3.7/10. The site's critical consensus reads, "The House squanders a decent premise and a talented cast on thin characterizations and a shortage of comic momentum." On Metacritic, the film has a weighted average score of 30 out of 100 based on 22 critics, indicating "generally unfavorable reviews". Audiences polled by CinemaScore gave the film an average grade of "B−" on an A+ to F scale.

Reflecting on the poor reviews in 2026, Ferrell said "(It) did not resonate at all but yet I still argue - that movie (is) funny" while Poehler added that her children tease her about the film but that she thought "it was a really fun movie"

=== Accolades ===
Year	Award	Category	Recipient	Result
2017	Golden Trailer Awards	Best Comedy	The House	Won
