= Brendan O'Brien (screenwriter) =

American screenwriter

- Born: Scarsdale, New York
- Occupation: Screenwriter
- Years active: 2014–present
- Spouse: Amanda Headrick
- Children: 2

Brendan O'Brien is an American screenwriter, best known for writing the 2014 film Neighbors along with Andrew J. Cohen.

== Early life and education ==
O'Brien and his screenwriter-director friend Andrew J. Cohen were both born and grew up in Scarsdale, New York, and both went to Scarsdale Middle School, where they became friends in the sixth grade. O'Brien graduated from Georgetown University.

== Career ==
In 2014, O'Brien co-wrote the script for the comedy film Neighbors along with Cohen, starring Zac Efron and Seth Rogen. The film was directed by Nicholas Stoller and released on May 9, 2014.

O'Brien and Cohen also co-wrote the scripts for two 2016 films, Neighbors 2: Sorority Rising and Mike and Dave Need Wedding Dates.

O'Brien and Cohen also co-wrote the 2017 comedy film The House. Cohen made his directing debut with the film.

In June 2020 it was announced that O'Brien was set to write the screenplay for Teenage Mutant Ninja Turtles: Mutant Mayhem. He would ultimately receive a "Story by" credit.

== Personal life ==
O'Brien is married to Amanda Headrick. They have two boys, Gabriel and Jack.

== Filmography ==
- Neighbors (2014)
- Neighbors 2: Sorority Rising (2016)
- Mike and Dave Need Wedding Dates (2016)
- The House (2017)
- Teenage Mutant Ninja Turtles: Mutant Mayhem (2023) (Story only)
- Back in Action (2025)
