= List of 2018 box office number-one films in Austria =

This is a list of films which were placed as number one at the weekend box office for the year 2018.

== Number-one films ==
| # | Date | Film | Ref. |
|---|---|---|---|
| 1 | January 7, 2018 | Jumanji: Welcome to the Jungle | |
| 2 | January 14, 2018 | Jumanji: Welcome to the Jungle | |
| 3 | January 21, 2018 | Jumanji: Welcome to the Jungle | |
| 4 | January 28, 2018 | Wonder | |
| 5 | February 4, 2018 | Maze Runner: The Death Cure | |
| 6 | February 11, 2018 | Fifty Shades Freed | |
| 7 | February 18, 2018 | Fifty Shades Freed | |
| 8 | February 25, 2018 | Fifty Shades Freed | |
| 9 | March 4, 2018 | Red Sparrow | |
| 10 | March 11, 2018 | Red Sparrow | |
| 11 | March 18, 2018 | Tomb Raider | |
| 12 | March 25, 2018 | Peter Rabbit | |
| 13 | April 1, 2018 | Peter Rabbit | |
| 14 | April 8, 2018 | Ready Player One | |
| 15 | April 15, 2018 | Blockers | |
| 16 | April 22, 2018 | Blockers | |
| 17 | April 29, 2018 | Avengers: Infinity War | |
| 18 | May 6, 2018 | Avengers: Infinity War | |
| 19 | May 13, 2018 | Avengers: Infinity War | |
| 20 | May 20, 2018 | Deadpool 2 | |
| 21 | May 27, 2018 | Deadpool 2 | |
| 22 | June 3, 2018 | Deadpool 2 | |
| 23 | June 10, 2018 | Jurassic World: Fallen Kingdom | |
| 24 | June 17, 2018 | Jurassic World: Fallen Kingdom | |
| 25 | June 24, 2018 | Jurassic World: Fallen Kingdom | |
| 26 | July 1, 2018 | Jurassic World: Fallen Kingdom | |
| 27 | July 8, 2018 | The First Purge | |
| 28 | July 15, 2018 | The First Purge | |
| 29 | July 22, 2018 | Mamma Mia! Here We Go Again | |
| 30 | July 29, 2018 | Mamma Mia! Here We Go Again | |
| 31 | August 5, 2018 | Mission: Impossible – Fallout | |
| 32 | August 12, 2018 | Mission: Impossible – Fallout | |
| 33 | August 19, 2018 | The Equalizer 2 | |
| 34 | August 26, 2018 | Sauerkrautkoma | |
| 35 | September 2, 2018 | The Spy Who Dumped Me | |
| 36 | September 9, 2018 | The Nun | |
| 37 | September 16, 2018 | The Nun | |
| 38 | September 23, 2018 | The Nun | |
| 39 | September 30, 2018 | Incredibles 2 | |
| 40 | October 7, 2018 | Venom | |
| 41 | October 14, 2018 | Venom | |
| 42 | October 21, 2018 | Johnny English Strikes Again | |
| 43 | October 28, 2018 | Halloween | |
| 44 | November 4, 2018 | Bohemian Rhapsody | |
| 45 | November 11, 2018 | Bohemian Rhapsody | |
| 46 | November 18, 2018 | Fantastic Beasts: The Crimes of Grindelwald | |
| 47 | November 25, 2018 | Fantastic Beasts: The Crimes of Grindelwald | |
| 48 | December 2, 2018 | The Grinch | |
| 49 | December 9, 2018 | The Grinch | |
| 50 | December 16, 2018 | The Grinch | |
| 51 | December 23, 2018 | The Grinch | |
| 52 | December 30, 2018 | Aquaman | |

== Most successful films by box office admissions ==
Most successful films of 2018 by number of movie tickets sold in Austria.

| Rank | Title | Tickets sold | Country |
|---|---|---|---|
| 1. | Mamma Mia! Here We Go Again | 480,496 | United States, United Kingdom |
| 2. | Avengers: Infinity War | 411,857 | United States |
| 3. | Fifty Shades Freed | 402,824 | United States |
| 4. | Fantastic Beasts: The Crimes of Grindelwald | 339,966 | United States, United Kingdom |
| 5. | Hotel Transylvania 3: Summer Vacation | 337,222 | United States |
| 6. | The Grinch | 333,969 | United States |
| 7. | Bohemian Rhapsody | 322,633 | United States, United Kingdom |
| 8. | Deadpool 2 | 300,581 | United States |
| 9. | Jurassic World: Fallen Kingdom | 282,438 | United States |
| 10. | Incredibles 2 | 236,800 | United States |

== See also ==
- Cinema of Austria

| Preceded by 2017 | 2018 | Succeeded by 2019 |
