= Neighbors (2014 film) =

2014 film by Nicholas Stoller

- Theatrical release poster
- Directed by: Nicholas Stoller
- Written by: Andrew J. Cohen; Brendan O'Brien
- Produced by: Evan Goldberg; Seth Rogen; James Weaver
- Starring: Seth Rogen; Zac Efron; Rose Byrne; Christopher Mintz-Plasse; Dave Franco
- Cinematography: Brandon Trost
- Edited by: Zene Baker
- Music by: Michael Andrews
- Production companies: Good Universe; Point Grey Pictures
- Distributed by: Universal Pictures
- Release dates: March 8, 2014 (SXSW); May 9, 2014 (United States)
- Running time: 97 minutes
- Country: United States
- Language: English
- Budget: $18 million
- Box office: $270.7 million

Neighbors (released in some countries as Bad Neighbours) is a 2014 American comedy film directed by Nicholas Stoller and written by Andrew J. Cohen and Brendan O'Brien. The film stars Seth Rogen and Zac Efron, with Rose Byrne, Dave Franco, and Christopher Mintz-Plasse in supporting roles. The plot follows a couple who come into conflict with a fraternity that has recently moved in next door, which leads them into an all-out war.

The film premiered at South by Southwest on March 8, 2014, and was released by Universal Pictures on May 9 in the United States. The film received generally positive reviews, with praise aimed at Efron's breakout performance, and was a commercial success, grossing $270.7 million worldwide against an $18 million budget, and became Rogen's highest-grossing live-action film. A sequel, Neighbors 2: Sorority Rising, was released on May 20, 2016, with Stoller returning to direct, and much of the cast reprising their roles.

== Plot ==
Mac Radner and his Australian-born wife Kelly are adjusting to life with their infant daughter, Stella. The restrictions of parenthood make it difficult for them to maintain their old lifestyle, which alienates them from their friends Jimmy Blevins and his ex-wife, Paula. Delta Psi Beta, a fraternity known for outrageous parties, moves in next door. The fraternity's leaders, Teddy Sanders and Pete Regazolli, aspire to join Delta Psi's Hall of Fame by throwing a massive end-of-the-year party.

The Radners ask Teddy to keep the noise down and to earn their favor, he invites them to join the party. Kelly meets Teddy's girlfriend Brooke Shy, and Teddy shows Mac his bedroom, which includes a stash of fireworks and a breaker box that controls the house's power. Teddy agrees to manage the noise but has Mac and Kelly promise to always call him instead of the police.

The following night, when the party next door keeps Stella awake, Mac is unable to reach Teddy. Kelly convinces Mac to call the police anonymously, but Officer Watkins identifies them to Teddy. Feeling betrayed, Teddy leads Delta Psi in hazing Mac and Kelly, resulting in Stella nearly eating an unused condom after the fraternity dumps their garbage on the Radners’ lawn. Mac and Kelly go to the college dean Carol Gladstone, but the school has a “three strikes” policy before it will intervene; Delta Psi's first strike was burning down their old house.

Failing to force the fraternity to move by damaging the water pipes, thus ruining the foundation of their house, Kelly manipulates Pete and Brooke into having sex, and Mac leads Teddy to catch them in the act. The ensuing physical fight between Teddy and Pete is followed by a round of the ever-popular "Throw Shit Off The Porch", during which a runaway barbecue grill knocks out a passing pedestrian who turns out to be a professor. This gives Delta Psi their second strike and places them on probation, effectively ending their party plans.

Determined to shut down the fraternity, Mac and Kelly enlist the help of Jimmy, who is jealous that Paula is sleeping with Delta Psi member Scoonie. To acquire evidence of Delta Psi's hazing, they hire a pledge nicknamed Assjuice to stand up to Teddy and record him threatening retaliation.

Rather than a ruthless hazing, Teddy instead shows compassion, so Assjuice reveals that Mac and Kelly hired him and are trying to sabotage the fraternity. A vengeful Teddy violently pranks the Radners and Jimmy with airbags. He later revealed to them that even though he is graduating that year, there would always be someone there to take his place.

Mac, Kelly, and Jimmy send Teddy a counterfeit letter from Gladstone lifting Delta Psi's probation. So, the fraternity prepares for its end-of-the-year party, which Mac, Kelly, and Jimmy widely publicize to ensure it will be out of control. Once the party is in full swing, they notify the police, but Teddy soon discovers the letter was a forgery, finding Hebrew writing instead of Latin in the University Seal, and there were more adults than students attending the party.

Aware that the Radners were responsible, Teddy stops the party just as Watkins arrives. The Radners and Jimmy sneak into the frat house. Jimmy throws himself from the balcony to distract Teddy, allowing Kelly to sneak into Teddy's bedroom as Mac fights him off.

Unable to open the breaker box to restart the party and alert Watkins, Kelly shoots one of the fireworks at his patrol car. Paula convinces Scoonie to turn on the power at another breaker box, reigniting the party, and she reunites with Jimmy. Teddy takes the blame for the party, convincing Pete to flee with the others, so he is arrested and the fraternity shut down.

Four months later, Mac runs into Teddy, who is working as a shirtless greeter at Abercrombie & Fitch. They greet each other warmly and Teddy reveals he is attending night classes to complete his degree. Mac takes off his shirt and jokingly acts as a greeter with Teddy. Later, Mac and Kelly take pictures of Stella in various costumes for a calendar. They get a call from Jimmy and Paula inviting them to attend Burning Man. Mac and Kelly decline, accepting their new roles as parents.

== Cast ==
- Seth Rogen as Mac Radner, Kelly's husband
- Zac Efron as Teddy Sanders, president of Delta Psi Beta
- Rose Byrne as Kelly Radner, Mac's wife
- Elise and Zoey Vargas as Stella, The Radner's daughter
- Christopher Mintz-Plasse as Scoonie Schofield, a member of Delta Psi Beta
- Dave Franco as Pete Regazolli, vice-president of Delta Psi Beta
- Ike Barinholtz as Jimmy Blevins, Mac and Kelly's friend
- Carla Gallo as Paula Faldt-Blevins, Jimmy's ex-wife
- Jerrod Carmichael as Garfield “Garf” Slade, a member of Delta Psi Beta
- Craig Roberts as Gary "Assjuice", a pledge for Delta Psi Beta
- Lisa Kudrow as Dean Carol Gladstone
- Hannibal Buress as Officer Watkins
- Halston Sage as Brooke Shy
- Ali Cobrin as Whitney
- Jason Mantzoukas as Dr. Theodorakis
- Brian Huskey as Bill Wazowkowski, Mac's boss
- Liz Cackowski as Wendy, Mac and Kelly's realtor
- Randall Park as the AT&T job fair recruiter
- Natasha Leggero as herself

Andy Samberg, Akiva Schaffer, Jorma Taccone, Adam DeVine, Blake Anderson, Anders Holm, Kyle Newacheck, and Jake Johnson make cameo appearances as historical members of Delta Psi Beta.

== Production ==
Seth Rogen and Zac Efron became attached to the film before it was pitched to studios. Universal and New Line Cinema put in bids for the film, with Universal eventually securing the rights of the then-untitled project in July 2011, which was written by Andrew J. Cohen and Brendan O'Brien. The script was written shortly after. It was inspired by Cohen and O'Brien's fear of adulthood. In May 2012, Nicholas Stoller was in talks to direct the film. The story was originally about Rogen's character and students in a frat, but as it was too similar to Old School, Stoller changed the script so that it would focus on Rogen's character and his wife against the frat students. Producer Evan Goldberg said: "The initial idea was frat war with Zac Efron. Maybe Seth, but definitely Zac Efron." Byrne's role grew from a footnote relegated to the responsibilities of adulthood to a full-on partner-in-crime. Cohen also said: "Initially, our biggest problem with the script was that it was too repetitious, and amping up Kelly’s involvement and bringing her into the war broke everything wide open." Rogen welcomed the change, "to me that made it even better because it became less about me and some guys fucking with a frat. It was much more about me and my wife, which was way more interesting." The cast and crew had two weeks of rehearsals during which they practiced improvisation.

Principal photography began in April 2013 and was completed by the end of May 2013 in Los Angeles, United States. Filming lasted 38 days. The two houses used in the film are situated in the West Adams District of Los Angeles.

Cameras and iPhones were distributed to extras, partygoers, and cast members for additional first-person perspective. On August 26, 2013, the film's original title Townies was changed to Neighbors. The film was released as Bad Neighbours outside of the United States, to prevent confusion with the similarly titled Australian soap opera. Compared with other English-speaking countries, the Australian soap was not widely known in the United States at the time the movie was released.

A "work-in-progress" cut of the film was screened on March 8, 2014, at The Paramount Theatre in Austin, Texas during South by Southwest.

== Release ==
Neighbors grossed $150.2 million in North America and $120.5 million in other territories, for a worldwide total of $270.7 million against a budget of $18 million, which is more than 50% less than the average film budget. Since this was the case, all of the actors had to undergo major pay cuts. Calculating in all expenses, Deadline Hollywood estimated that the film made a profit of $136.1 million. It is Rogen's highest grossing non-animated film, surpassing Knocked Up ($219.1 million).

The film grossed $49 million in its opening weekend in North America, finishing the weekend in first place at the box office. The opening total was the third highest United States opening for a non-sequel R-rated comedy behind Sex and the City ($57 million) in 2008 and Ted ($54.4 million) in 2012.

=== Home media ===
Neighbors was released on DVD and Blu-ray on September 23, 2014.

== Reception ==
On Rotten Tomatoes, the film holds an approval rating of 72% based on 221 reviews, with an average rating of 6.4/10. The website's critics consensus reads, "With plenty of bawdy humor evenly spread between its well-matched stars, Neighbors earns its R rating -- and filmgoers' laughs." On Metacritic, the film has a weighted average score of 68 out of 100 based on 45 critics, indicating "generally favorable reviews". Audiences polled by CinemaScore gave the film an average grade of "B" on an A+ to F scale.

Critics praised Efron's performance, and noted that he had successfully shed the "Disney kid" pretty boy stereotype. Critics also praised Byrne's performance and the writers' decision to have her character be a co-conspirator with Rogen's character as opposed to having her on the sidelines.

=== Accolades ===
List of awards and nominations
Group	Date of ceremony	Category	Recipients	Outcome
15th Golden Trailer Awards	May 30, 2014	Best Comedy	Trailer 4	Nominated
15th Golden Trailer Awards	May 30, 2014	Best Comedy Poster	Teaser One-sheet	Won
15th Golden Trailer Awards	May 30, 2014	Best Comedy TV Spot	Mad Neighbors	Won
MTV Movie Awards	April 12, 2015	Best On-Screen Duo	Zac Efron and Dave Franco	Won
MTV Movie Awards	April 12, 2015	Best Shirtless Performance	Zac Efron	Won
MTV Movie Awards	April 12, 2015	Best Fight	Seth Rogen vs. Zac Efron	Nominated
MTV Movie Awards	April 12, 2015	Best Kiss	Rose Byrne and Halston Sage	Nominated
MTV Movie Awards	April 12, 2015	#WTF Moment	Seth Rogen and Rose Byrne	Won
MTV Movie Awards	April 12, 2015	Best Musical Moment	Seth Rogen and Zac Efron	Nominated
MTV Movie Awards	April 12, 2015	Best Comedic Performance	Rose Byrne	Nominated
2014 Young Hollywood Awards	July 28, 2014	Best Threesome	Zac Efron, Dave Franco, Christopher Mintz-Plasse	Nominated
2014 Young Hollywood Awards	July 28, 2014	Best Cast Chemistry–Film	Neighbors cast	Nominated
41st People's Choice Awards	January 7, 2015	Favorite Comedic Movie	Neighbors	Nominated
20th Critics' Choice Awards	January 15, 2015	Best Actress in a Comedy	Rose Byrne	Nominated

== Soundtrack ==
Neighbors (Original Motion Picture Soundtrack)

Soundtrack album by Various artists
- Released: April 29, 2014
- Length: 42:58
- Labels: Atlantic, Back Lot

The soundtrack was released as a digital download in the US on April 29, 2014, and in the UK on May 12, 2014.

Standard edition
No.	Title	Artists	Length
1.	"Get Ur Freak On / Keep Me"	Missy Elliott and The Black Keys	3:27
2.	"Freaking Out"	Flo Rida feat. StayC Reign	2:58
3.	"Good Day"	Nappy Roots	3:39
4.	"London Bridge"	Fergie	3:25
5.	"Girls Girls $"	Theophilus London	3:12
6.	"All Night"	Icona Pop	3:08
7.	"Hurt Me Tomorrow"	K'naan	3:49
8.	"Die Young"	Kesha	3:33
9.	"Cheap Beer"	FIDLAR	2:23
10.	"Raise Those Hands"	Bassjackers and R3hab	4:57
11.	"First Name Trouble"	Witchman featuring Marz	4:16
12.	"Here Comes the Hotstepper" (Heartical Remix)	Ini Kamoze	4:11

== Sequel ==
On February 6, 2015, it was announced that a sequel to Neighbors was in development, entitled Sorority Rising, with Stoller set to return to direct. Once again written by Andrew J. Cohen and Brendan O'Brien, the film follows Mac and Kelly joining forces with Teddy to take on the sorority girls who move into the old frat house. Rogen, Byrne, and Efron, as well as Franco, Barinholtz, and Gallo, all reprised their roles. Chloë Grace Moretz, Kiersey Clemons, Beanie Feldstein, and Selena Gomez also joined the cast. Principal photography began in mid-2015 and the film was released May 20, 2016.
