= Neighbors 2: Sorority Rising =

2016 film by Nicholas Stoller

- Theatrical release poster
- Directed by: Nicholas Stoller
- Written by: Andrew J. Cohen; Brendan O'Brien; Nicholas Stoller; Evan Goldberg; Seth Rogen
- Based on: Characters by Andrew J. Cohen; Brendan O'Brien
- Produced by: Seth Rogen; Evan Goldberg; James Weaver
- Starring: Seth Rogen; Zac Efron; Rose Byrne; Chloë Grace Moretz; Dave Franco; Ike Barinholtz
- Cinematography: Brandon Trost
- Edited by: Zene Baker
- Music by: Michael Andrews
- Production companies: Good Universe; Perfect World Pictures; Point Grey Pictures
- Distributed by: Universal Pictures
- Release dates: April 26, 2016 (Berlin); May 20, 2016 (United States)
- Running time: 92 minutes
- Country: United States
- Language: English
- Budget: $35 million
- Box office: $108 million

Neighbors 2: Sorority Rising (released in some countries as Bad Neighbours 2) is a 2016 American comedy film directed by Nicholas Stoller and written by Stoller, Andrew J. Cohen, Brendan O'Brien, Seth Rogen and Evan Goldberg. A sequel to Neighbors (2014), the plot follows the Radners (Rogen and Rose Byrne) having to outwit a new sorority led by Shelby (Chloë Grace Moretz), living next door to sell their house currently in escrow. In addition to Rogen and Byrne, Zac Efron, Dave Franco, Christopher Mintz-Plasse, Jerrod Carmichael, Ike Barinholtz, Carla Gallo, Hannibal Buress, and Lisa Kudrow also reprise their roles from the first film.

Neighbors 2: Sorority Rising premiered on April 26, 2016, in Berlin and was released by Universal Pictures on May 20, 2016, in the United States, receiving mostly positive reviews and grossed $108 million worldwide against a $35 million budget.

== Plot ==
Mac and Kelly Radner are expecting their second child, and prepare to sell their home to the Baiers family. However, the Radners' realtor reminds them that the house is in escrow for 30 days. Mac's friend Jimmy and his wife Paula are also expecting a baby.

College freshman Shelby meets fellow freshmen Beth and Nora. They learn that sororities are not allowed to host parties, and are disgusted by sexist and predatory frat parties. So, the trio create a new sorority, Kappa Nu, to throw their own parties.

Teddy Sanders hosts poker night with his former frat brothers. Pete is an openly gay, successful architect, Scoonie runs his own mobile app, and Garf is a rookie cop. However, Teddy now has a criminal record and cannot find a worthwhile job.

The friends help Pete's boyfriend Darren propose, leading Pete to ask Teddy to move out. Distraught, he goes to their old frat house, next door to the Radners. He meets Shelby, Beth, and Nora, the girls hoping to rent it for Kappa Nu but unable to afford it. Finding an opportunity to be valued, Teddy offers to help them throw parties, so they can earn enough donations and new members to pay rent.

Fearing that the sorority will scare off the Baiers, Mac and Kelly ask Shelby to temporarily refrain from partying, but she refuses. The Radners go to Dean Gladstone, who cannot control an independent sorority, and Shelby's father, who also fails to help, leading Kappa Nu to prank the Radners. Mac, Kelly, Jimmy, and Paula retaliate, infesting the sorority house with bed bugs, forcing the girls to evacuate and pay for fumigation tenting, just in time for the Baiers' visit. Teddy argues with Pete about the state of his life and moves into the sorority.

Low on funds to pay rent, the girls plan to sell marijuana at their 'tailgate party', eliminating the competition by getting all other dealers arrested. Teddy deems the idea to be too risky, forcing the girls to kick him out. Teddy joins the Radners to take down Kappa Nu.

They infiltrate the party, and Teddy distracts the girls while Mac steals their marijuana. Realizing Teddy's lack of direction in life, Mac and Kelly let him stay with them. The girls switch Mac and Kelly's cell phone numbers with their own and send text messages tricking Mac into flying to Sydney, Australia. Returning home, the Radners find Kappa Nu has robbed and vandalized their house, and the Baiers, now aware that there is a sorority next door, threaten to pull out from the sale unless the sorority is kicked out.

The sorority receives an eviction notice, so Shelby reluctantly organizes a sexually gratuitous frat-style party to raise money. As Mac and Kelly wait to call the police, Jimmy and Paula sneak into the party, while Teddy is unable to shut off the sorority's power. Shelby steals Mac and Kelly's phones and locks Mac and Teddy in the garage, but they break out using airbags. Overhearing Beth and Nora confront Shelby for compromising their original goals, Kelly encourages the girls not to give up on themselves.

Paula goes into labor, and Teddy reconciles with Pete and Darren, happily agreeing to serve as their best man. The sorority enjoys a more empowering party for themselves and discover a crowd of girls from other sororities wanting to join Kappa Nu. With an overflow of money and new members, the sorority is able to keep their home, and the Radners agree to rent their house to Kappa Nu as well, earning them a bigger cashflow than selling the house.

Three months later, Teddy has become a successful wedding planner for gay couples, using his party-planning experience; he prepares Pete to walk down the aisle. Mac and Kelly have moved into their new home, with no close neighbors, and realized they have been good parents all along. They bring home their new baby daughter Mildred to meet Jimmy and Paula with their new son, Jimmy Jr.

== Cast ==
- Seth Rogen as Mac Radner
- Zac Efron as Teddy Sanders
- Rose Byrne as Kelly Radner
- Chloë Grace Moretz as Shelby Robek
- Dave Franco as Pete Regazolli
- Ike Barinholtz as Jimmy Blevins
- Jerrod Carmichael as Garfield "Garf" Slade
- Carla Gallo as Paula Faldt-Blevins
- Kiersey Clemons as Beth Gladstone
- Beanie Feldstein as Nora Clerk
- Hannibal Buress as Officer Watkins
- Christopher Mintz-Plasse as Scoonie Schofield
- Elise and Zoey Vargas as Stella Radner
- Selena Gomez as Madison
- Lisa Kudrow as Dean Carol Gladstone
- John Early as Darren McCallister
- Kelsey Grammer as Mr. Robek, Shelby's father
- Brian Huskey as Bill Wazowkowski
- Clara Mamet as Maranda
- Awkwafina as Christine
- Liz Cackowski as Wendy the Realtor
- Billy Eichner as Oliver Studebaker
- Abbi Jacobson as Jessica Baiers
- Sam Richardson as Eric Baiers
- Kyle Mooney as resident assistant of the college dorm
- Johnny Pemberton as frat boy
- Ciara Bravo as sorority girl

== Production ==
=== Development ===
By early February 2015, a sequel to Neighbors was in development, with Nicholas Stoller set to return to direct. Andrew J. Cohen and Brendan O'Brien returned to write the film, along with Stoller, Seth Rogen, and Evan Goldberg. Goldberg said he read a list of feminist essays as part of research for the script. Two female comedians, Amanda Lund and Maria Blasucci, were brought on board to punch up the jokes, but director Stoller explained they were ultimately not given writer's credits because of Writers Guild stipulations. The film follows Mac and Kelly joining forces with Delta Psi frat leader Teddy to take on the sorority girls who move in next door. Rogen, Rose Byrne, and Zac Efron returned to star. The film was initially scheduled to begin principal photography in mid-2015.

=== Casting ===
In July 2015, Chloë Grace Moretz joined the cast, and the title was revealed to be Neighbors 2: Sorority Rising. On August 4, 2015, it was confirmed that Carla Gallo and Ike Barinholtz would be returning for the sequel. On August 7, 2015, Beanie Feldstein and Kiersey Clemons were added to the cast to play Moretz's character's sorority sisters. On August 13, 2015, The Hollywood Reporter confirmed that Dave Franco would return for the sequel. Selena Gomez was seen filming on set. Lisa Kudrow was also spotted filming, along with other cast. By September 24, 2015, Billy Eichner had joined the cast of the film. The same month, it was revealed that Hannibal Buress and Jerrod Carmichael had been cast in the film, reprising their roles from the first film. Clara Mamet and Awkwafina also joined the cast. On November 18, 2015, it was announced that Cameron Dallas had joined the cast. In December 2015, it was revealed that Abbi Jacobson had also joined the cast, followed by Christopher Mintz-Plasse, Liz Cackowski, and Brian Huskey, all reprising their roles from the first film.

=== Filming ===
Principal photography began on August 31, 2015, in Atlanta, Georgia, and ended on October 29, 2015.

=== Post-production ===
During post-production, Lena Dunham, LL Cool J, and Cameron Dallas's scenes were all cut from the film. In her cut scene, Dunham played Joan of Arc. LL Cool J played Beth's father.

== Release ==
On February 6, 2015, Universal Pictures scheduled the film for release on May 13, 2016. However, on July 27, 2015, the film was pushed back one week to May 20, 2016.

=== Home media ===
Neighbors 2: Sorority Rising was released on Digital HD on September 6, 2016, and on DVD and Blu-ray on September 20, 2016, by Universal Pictures Home Entertainment.

=== Box office ===
Neighbors 2: Sorority Rising grossed $55.4 million in North America and $55.3 million in other territories for a worldwide total of $108.8 million, against a budget of $35 million.

In North America, Neighbors 2: Sorority Rising opened alongside The Angry Birds Movie and The Nice Guys, and was projected to gross $35–40 million from 3,384 theaters in its opening weekend. The film grossed $8.7 million on its first day, including $1.7 million from Thursday night previews (lower than the original's $2.5 million). In its opening weekend the film grossed $21.8 million, less than half both the previous film's opening ($49 million) and projections, and finished third at the box office behind The Angry Birds Movie ($38.2 million) and Captain America: Civil War ($32.9 million). The film dropped 57% to $9.4 million in its second weekend, including $11.4 million over the four-day Memorial Day weekend, finishing fifth.

Internationally, where it is known as Bad Neighbours 2, the film was released in a total of 56 countries. It was released in 16 markets on May 6, 2016, where it earned $8 million in its opening weekend. The United Kingdom and Ireland posted the top opening for the film with $2.4 million, followed by Australia with $1.8 million and $1.5 million in Germany.

== Reception ==
On Rotten Tomatoes, the film has an approval rating of 65% based on 203 reviews, with an average rating of 5.8/10. The website's critical consensus reads, "Neighbors 2: Sorority Rising may not be strictly necessary, but it still wrings a surprising amount of humor from a recycled premise with a distaff twist." On Metacritic, the film has a weighted average score of 58 out of 100, based on 39 critics, indicating "mixed or average reviews". Audiences polled by CinemaScore gave the film an average grade of "B" on an A+ to F scale, the same grade earned by its predecessor, while PostTrak reported audiences gave the film a 67% overall positive score and a 45% "definite recommend".

Mike Ryan of Uproxx gave the film a positive review, writing, "In a world in which so many comedy sequels fail, here comes a comedy sequel that isn't just 'as good as the first movie,' it's even better." The Guardian awarded it two stars out of five, saying, "This pretty routine follow-up has some decent material and amiable bad taste, heavily diluted with gallons of very ordinary sequel product: more of the same."

In addition, critics praised the movie for its depiction of a gay relationship and positive support from friends in a bromance that avoids gay panic, instead embracing acceptance. The film was also commended for its purported feminist message and for engaging in issues of gender equality, but has also inspired debate about its degree of progressivism.

=== Accolades ===
Award	Category	Recipient(s)	Result	Ref(s)
Golden Trailer Awards	Best Comedy	"Trailer 2 (Nu Rules Green Band)"	Nominated	
Golden Trailer Awards	Trashiest Poster	"Teaser"	Nominated	
People's Choice Awards	Favorite Comedic Movie	Neighbors 2: Sorority Rising	Nominated	
People's Choice Awards	Favorite Comedic Movie Actor	Zac Efron	Nominated	
Teen Choice Awards	Choice Movie Actor: Comedy	Zac Efron	Won	
Teen Choice Awards	Choice Movie Actress: Comedy	Chloë Grace Moretz	Won	
Teen Choice Awards	Choice Movie: Hissy Fit	Zac Efron	Nominated	

== Short film ==
On May 16, 2016, Seth Rogen uploaded a short film sequel to Sorority Rising to his Twitter account, titled Neighbors 3: Zombies Rising, in which he and Zac Efron reprise their roles as Mac and Teddy. The film follows the pair as they argue over how to deal with a tied up zombie, with matters becoming complicated when Teddy realizes the zombie was once part of his fraternity, Delta Psi Beta. The short ends after the pair accidentally kill the zombie, with Rogen and Efron themselves discussing what a great idea it would be for a third feature-length Neighbors film.
