= 2014 Young Hollywood Awards =

American entertainment awards

- Date: July 28, 2014
- Location: Los Angeles, California
- Hosted by: Kelly Osbourne

Television/radio coverage
- Network: The CW

The 16th Annual and the final Young Hollywood Awards were held on Monday, July 28, 2014 in Los Angeles, California, previously recorded the day before. Kelly Osbourne hosted the show, with Justin Bieber being honored for his charity work and contributions to the Make-A-Wish Foundation, and Vanessa Hudgens was honored with the Trendsetter Award.

The show honors the accomplishments of the entertainment industry's rising young stars from the worlds of television, music, film, fashion, sports and social media. Fans vote online in the categories of Fan Favorite Male and Female Actor.

== Winners and nominees ==
Reference: The first-named in each category is the winner.

Fan Favorite Actor–Male: Ansel Elgort (winner); Theo James; Channing Tatum; Michael B. Jordan; Adam Driver; Andrew Garfield; Jonah Hill; Josh Hutcherson; Liam Hemsworth; Andy Samberg; Taylor Lautner; Aaron Paul	Fan Favorite Actor–Female: Chloë Grace Moretz (winner); Emilia Clarke; Shailene Woodley; Kaley Cuoco-Sweeting; Allison Williams; Zooey Deschanel; Emma Stone; Nina Dobrev; Taylor Schilling; Jennifer Lawrence; Emmy Rossum; Emma Roberts
Coolest Cross Over Artist: Nick Jonas (winner); Ariana Grande; Shaun White; Kate Upton; Lea Michele	Best #SocialMediaSuperstar: Ashley Tisdale (winner); Ariana Grande; Austin Mahone; Bella Thorne; Chrissy Teigen; R5
Breakthrough Actress: Danielle Brooks (winner); Margot Robbie; Elle Fanning; Nicola Peltz; Dakota Johnson	Breakthrough Actor: Dylan O'Brien (winner); Sam Claflin; Nat Wolff; Ansel Elgort; Miles Teller
Best Threesome: Nina Dobrev, Ian Somerhalder, and Paul Wesley –The Vampire Diaries (winners); Jennifer Lawrence, Liam Hemsworth, and Josh Hutcherson –The Hunger Games; Adam DeVine, Anders Holm, and Blake Anderson –Workaholics; Zac Efron, Dave Franco, and Christopher Mintz-Plasse –Neighbors; Zac Efron, Miles Teller, and Michael B. Jordan –That Awkward Moment	Hottest Body: Derek Hough (winner); Kate Upton; Kellan Lutz; Chrissy Teigen; James Maslow
Best On-Screen Couple: Shailene Woodley and Ansel Elgort –The Fault in Our Stars (winners); Mayim Bialik and Jim Parsons –The Big Bang Theory; Shailene Woodley and Theo James –Divergent; Chris Colfer and Darren Criss –Glee; Emma Stone and Andrew Garfield –The Amazing Spider-Man 2	Best Bromance: Jonah Hill and Channing Tatum (winners); Mark Ballas and Derek Hough; Seth Rogen and James Franco; Adam Levine and Blake Shelton; Keegan-Michael Key and Jordan Peele
Super Superhero: Kellan Lutz–The Legend of Hercules (winners); Stephen Amell–Arrow; Chris Pratt–Guardians of the Galaxy; Chris Evans–Captain America: The Winter Soldier; Andrew Garfield–The Amazing Spider-Man 2; Nicholas Hoult–X-Men: Days of Future Past	Cuz You're Funny: Amy Schumer (winner); Aziz Ansari; Rebel Wilson; Adam DeVine; Kenan Thompson; Aubrey Plaza
We Love to Hate You: Pablo Schreiber–Orange Is the New Black (winner); Dane DeHaan–The Amazing Spider-Man 2; Jack Gleeson–Game of Thrones; Sam Riley–Maleficent; Zombies–The Walking Dead	Best Cast Chemistry–Film: The Fault in Our Stars (winner); Divergent; The Hunger Games; Neighbors; Veronica Mars; X-Men: Days of Future Past
Best Cast Chemistry–TV series: Modern Family (winner); The Big Bang Theory; Girls; Orange Is the New Black; Pretty Little Liars; The Vampire Diaries	Hottest Music Artist: Ed Sheeran (winner); Iggy Azalea; Ariana Grande; Demi Lovato; One Direction; Sam Smith
Breakout Music Artist: Sam Smith (winner); 5 Seconds of Summer; Martin Garrix; HAIM; Rita Ora; Rixton	Song of the Summer/DJ Replay: "Fancy"–Iggy Azalea ft. Charli XCX (winner); "Problem"–Ariana Grande ft. Iggy Azalea; "Really Don't Care"–Demi Lovato ft. Cher Lloyd; "Rude"–MAGIC!; "Stay with Me"–Sam Smith; "Wiggle"–Jason Derulo ft. Snoop Dogg
You're So Fancy: Bella Thorne (winner); Cara Delevingne; Kendall Jenner; Rita Ora; Emmy Rossum; Kiernan Shipka	Most Awesome Athlete: Louie Vito (winner); Kolohe Andino; Nyjah Huston; Los Angeles Kings; Chris Paul; Richard Sherman
Bingeworthy TV series: Orange Is the New Black (winner); Awkward; Game of Thrones; Pretty Little Liars; Teen Wolf; The Walking Dead	Favorite Flick: The Fault in Our Stars (winner); 22 Jump Street; Divergent; The Hunger Games; Maleficent; X-Men: Days of Future Past
Viral Superstar: Jenna Marbles (winner); Christina Grimmie; Ryan Higa; Bethany Mota; Tyler Oakley	Reality Royalty: The Bachelor and The Bachelorette (winner); America's Next Top Model; The Real Housewives; So You Think You Can Dance; The Voice
