= Nouveau Théâtre des Vampires =

- What We Do in the Shadows episode
- Episode no.: Season 2 Episode 10
- Directed by: Kyle Newacheck
- Written by: Sam Johnson; Stefani Robinson; Paul Simms
- Cinematography by: DJ Stipsen
- Editing by: Yana Gorskaya; Dane McMaster
- Production code: XWS02010
- Original air date: June 10, 2020
- Running time: 22 minutes

Guest appearance
- Jemaine Clement as Vladislav the Poker

Episode chronology
← Previous "Witches"	Next → "The Prisoner"

"Nouveau Théâtre des Vampires" is the tenth episode and season finale of the second season of the American mockumentary comedy horror television series What We Do in the Shadows, set in the franchise of the same name. It is the twentieth overall episode of the series and was written by co-executive producer Sam Johnson, executive producer Stefani Robinson, and executive producer Paul Simms, and directed by producer Kyle Newacheck. It was released on FX on June 10, 2020.

The series is set in Staten Island, New York City. Like the 2014 film, the series follows the lives of vampires in the city. These consist of three vampires, Nandor, Laszlo, and Nadja. They live alongside Colin Robinson, an energy vampire; and Guillermo, Nandor's familiar. The series explores the absurdity and misfortunes experienced by the vampires. In the episode, the vampires are invited to a special vampire event, unaware that it is a trap set by the Vampiric Council.

According to Nielsen Media Research, the episode was seen by an estimated 0.406 million household viewers and gained a 0.17 ratings share among adults aged 18–49. The episode received critical acclaim, with critics praising the humor, performances, character development and final scene.

== Plot ==
Nandor (Kayvan Novak) awakens from his coffin, but Guillermo (Harvey Guillén) is not there to help him. After inspecting the house, he goes to Guillermo's room. There, he finds a note that simply reads "sorry", indicating he left. Guillermo is revealed to be living in The Bronx with his mother, as he is conflicted with his nature as vampire killer and wanting to be turned into a vampire.

One week later, the house has fallen into chaos as the vampires cannot clean. They receive an invitation for the Nouveau Théâtre des Vampires, an important event for the high elite vampires. While the vampires arrive at the theater, Guillermo visits the house for a fridge, stumbling upon the disorganized house. He finds the invitation, discovering that the Vampiric Council is involved and hurries to the theater. At the theater, the vampires are restrained to their seats, with the master of ceremonies revealed to be Vladislav the Poker (Jemaine Clement). Vladislav accuses the vampires of killing Baron Afanas, as well as killing a vampiric family, unaware that it was Guillermo.

As the vampires are placed to be killed by a guillotine, Guillermo sneaks into the theater. The vampires state that Guillermo was responsible for the deaths, although their lack of knowledge of his last name does not help their argument. Guillermo suddenly appears and attacks some of the vampires, prompting Vladislav to escape. Guillermo eventually kills most of the vampires. When Nandor asks if he has anything to explain, Guillermo reveals his last name, de la Cruz, which annoys the vampires.

== Production ==
=== Development ===
In June 2020, FX confirmed that the tenth episode of the season would be titled "Nouveau Théâtre des Vampires", and that it would be written by co-executive producer Sam Johnson, executive producer Stefani Robinson, and executive producer Paul Simms, and directed by producer Kyle Newacheck. This was Johnson's second writing credit, Robinson's fourth writing credit, Simms' fourth writing credit, and Newacheck's fifth directing credit.

=== Casting ===
Jemaine Clement's appearance wasn't originally planned. The crew intended to have one of the guest actors from "The Trial", but scheduling conflicts prevented it. As Clement was in Toronto, where the series was filmed, they decided to have him reprise his role with only one day left for filming. Clement stated that had they known in advance, they would've brought Taika Waititi and Jonathan Brugh as well.

== Reception ==
=== Viewers ===
In its original American broadcast, "Nouveau Théâtre des Vampires" was seen by an estimated 0.406 million household viewers with a 0.17 in the 18–49 demographics. This means that 0.17 percent of all households with televisions watched the episode. This was a slight decrease in viewership from the previous episode, which was watched by 0.433 million household viewers with a 0.15 in the 18–49 demographics.

With DVR factored in, the episode was watched by 0.963 million viewers with a 0.4 in the 18–49 demographics.

=== Critical reviews ===
"Nouveau Théâtre des Vampires" received critical acclaim. Katie Rife of The A.V. Club gave the episode an "A" grade and wrote, "The ensuing events close up a hole in the plot I noted last week, namely that the vampire council seemed to be slacking in its efforts to bring the vampires to justice. 'Nouveau Théâtre Des Vampires' also brought Guillermo's inner conflict to its inevitable conclusion, although his departure from the household didn't last very long."

Alan Sepinwall of Rolling Stone wrote, "Given how horrible our own reality is right now, and how explosively funny this show is, it's a very welcome power for both the vampires and What We Do in the Shadows as a whole. Thank goodness we had these imbeciles to kick around for the last 10 weeks."

Tony Sokol of Den of Geek gave the episode a 4.5 star rating out of 5 and wrote, "In the What We Do in the Shadows season 2 finale, 'Nouveau Théâtre des Vampires,' all the world's a stage and the players merely vampires. It is a bittersweet ending to a strangely eventful and celebratory season, because parting is such sweet, though often salty, sorrow." Greg Wheeler of The Review Geek gave the episode a 4.5 star rating out of 5 and wrote, "What We Do in the Shadows has been one of the best comedies of the year and the second season has certainly had a lot of really good episodes. Quite what the third season has in store for us remains to be seen but one thing's for sure – Shadows has a lot more left in the tank yet."
