= Gail (What We Do in the Shadows) =

- What We Do in the Shadows episode
- Episode no.: Season 3 Episode 3
- Directed by: Kyle Newacheck
- Written by: Marika Sawyer
- Cinematography by: DJ Stipsen
- Editing by: Antonia de Barros; Daniel Haworth
- Production code: XWS03003
- Original air date: September 9, 2021
- Running time: 25 minutes

Guest appearances
- Aida Turturro as Gail; Kristen Schaal as The Guide; Derrick Beckles as Anton

Episode chronology
| ← Previous "The Cloak of Duplication" | Next → "The Casino" |

"Gail" is the third episode of the third season of the American mockumentary comedy horror television series What We Do in the Shadows, set in the franchise of the same name. It is the 23rd overall episode of the series and was written by co-executive producer Marika Sawyer, and directed by co-executive producer Kyle Newacheck. It was released on FX on September 9, 2021.

The series is set in Staten Island, New York City. Like the 2014 film, the series follows the lives of vampires in the city. These consist of three vampires, Nandor, Laszlo, and Nadja. They live alongside Colin Robinson, an energy vampire; and Guillermo, Nandor's familiar. The series explores the absurdity and misfortunes experienced by the vampires. In the episode, the vampires discover that Nandor is in a relationship with a human named Gail, who is also keeping a secret.

According to Nielsen Media Research, the episode was seen by an estimated 0.311 million household viewers and gained a 0.11 ratings share among adults aged 18–49. The episode received very positive reviews from critics, who praised the performances, humor and character development.

== Plot ==
The vampires and Guillermo (Harvey Guillén) note that Nandor (Kayvan Novak) has been leaving the house for unknown reasons. They track him to a hotel room, finding him having sex with a human named Gail (Aida Turturro). Nandor has been friends with her for the past forty years, with Nadja (Natasia Demetriou) expressing displeasure at Gail.

Nandor reveals that he intends to propose marriage to Gail, who has repeatedly turned down his offer of turning her into a vampire. Nadja converses with Gail, who quickly leaves the house when she realizes what day is. Nadja then witnesses as she turns into a werewolf, something that Nandor was aware. While helping Colin Robinson (Mark Proksch) in finding a book about the origins of energy vampires, Laszlo (Matt Berry) discovers his old jalopy car, which was taken by the Vampiric Council a long time ago. As the car cannot fully leave the library, they decide to dismantle and rebuild outside. This angers The Guide (Kristen Schaal), as they destroyed many ancient artifacts during the process, when there was clearly a button to open the door.

Nandor convinces the vampires to visit Gail's wolf pack, where tensions arise. Gail is also revealed to be dating Anton, the werewolf who turned her. As they prepare to fight, Guillermo suggests they could play kickball, inspired by Twilight. During the game, Nadja accidentally kicks the ball at Gail's head, killing her. To save her, Nandor turns Gail into a vampire/werewolf hybrid, resurrecting her. Nandor proposes to her, which she declines, feeling that marriage is not for her. To cheer him up, the vampires take Nandor to accompany them on Laszlo's car.

== Production ==
=== Development ===
In August 2021, FX confirmed that the third episode of the season would be titled "Gail", and that it would be written by co-executive producer Marika Sawyer, and directed by co-executive producer Kyle Newacheck. This was Sawyer's third writing credit, and Newacheck's seventh directing credit.

== Reception ==
=== Viewers ===
In its original American broadcast, "Gail" was seen by an estimated 0.311 million household viewers with a 0.11 in the 18-49 demographics. This means that 0.11 percent of all households with televisions watched the episode. This was a 31% decrease in viewership from the previous episode, which was watched by 0.448 million household viewers with a 0.17 in the 18-49 demographics.

=== Critical reviews ===
"Gail" received very positive reviews from critics. Katie Rife of The A.V. Club gave the episode a "B+" grade and wrote, "This season of What We Do In The Shadows is giving viewers new opportunities to respectfully appreciate this aspect of the British actor's charms, especially on this week's episode. In the past, Nandor has always presented himself as something of a lonely heart, but 'Gail' reveals that he's had a side piece — or is he her side piece? Seems more like the latter, actually — for the last 40 years."

Tony Sokol of Den of Geek gave the episode a 4 star rating out of 5 and wrote, "What We Do in the Shadows is bubbling just below last season but still delivering satisfying episodes. They're just quite not as filling. But this week's puppy chow is yummy."

Melody McCune of Telltale TV gave the episode a 4 star rating out of 5 and wrote, "'Gail' dives deeper into the lives of our favorite vampires, hilariously humanizing them and making them more lovable than ever (a feat that doesn't seem possible). What We Do in the Shadows maintains its status as the sharpest comedy on TV, and long may it reign." Alejandra Bodden of Bleeding Cool gave the episode an 8.5 out of 10 rating and wrote, "This week's episode of FX's What We Do in the Shadows, 'Gail', was a worthy follow-up to the season premiere last week. Another episode that made us laugh from beginning to end."
