= Witches (What We Do in the Shadows) =

- What We Do in the Shadows episode
- Episode no.: Season 2 Episode 9
- Directed by: Kyle Newacheck
- Written by: William Meny
- Cinematography by: DJ Stipsen
- Editing by: Yana Gorskaya; Dane McMaster
- Production code: XWS02009
- Original air date: June 3, 2020
- Running time: 21 minutes

Guest appearances
- Lucy Punch as Lilith; Clara Wong as Quinn

Episode chronology
← Previous "Collaboration"	Next → "Nouveau Théâtre des Vampires"

"Witches" is the ninth episode of the second season of the American mockumentary comedy horror television series What We Do in the Shadows, set in the franchise of the same name. It is the nineteenth overall episode of the series and was written by William Meny, and directed by producer Kyle Newacheck. It was released on FX on June 3, 2020.

The series is set in Staten Island, New York City. Like the 2014 film, the series follows the lives of vampires in the city. These consist of three vampires, Nandor, Laszlo, and Nadja. They live alongside Colin Robinson, an energy vampire; and Guillermo, Nandor's familiar. The series explores the absurdity and misfortunes experienced by the vampires. In the episode, Nandor and Laszlo are kidnapped by witches, prompting the rest to rescue them.

According to Nielsen Media Research, the episode was seen by an estimated 0.433 million household viewers and gained a 0.15 ratings share among adults aged 18–49. The episode received positive reviews from critics, who praised the humor although its storyline received a more mixed response.

== Plot ==
While working at his topiary, Laszlo (Matt Berry) encounters a goat talking to him. Suddenly, he is magically transported out of the house. The vampires go outside to investigate, with Nandor (Kayvan Novak) finding the goat, causing him to be transported as well. Nadja (Natasia Demetriou) deduces witches are involved and has Guillermo (Harvey Guillén) drive her and Colin Robinson (Mark Proksch).

They follow the witches to a shop, so Nadja tells Guillermo to investigate. While he is inside, the goat appears to Nadja and Colin Robinson, and he transports them. The store's owner, Quinn (Clara Wong) leads Guillermo to a room where he finds Nadja and Colin Robinson. The room is a holding cell with multiple doors that takes them to different locations. Laszlo and Nandor are part of a ritual, with the witch Lilith (Lucy Punch) explaining that they want their sperm for a youth potion. They do not actually object to the ritual, although they are alarmed with the surgical tools needed for the ritual.

Guillermo eventually discovers an exit door named "Salida", releasing them. They arrive for the ritual, with Colin Robinson taken as well to extract his sperm. Before Nadja can intervene, Lilith stops her. It is revealed that Nadja and Lilith became mortal enemies, after Nadja caught her having sex with Laszlo using her shapeshifting ability to pretend to be her. Guillermo arrives, offering the witches a deal. He can supply them with unlimited sperm (certain doses of Nandor and Laszlo) in exchange for a small share of the profits. The witches accept and release Laszlo, Nandor and Colin Robinson. When the vampires return home, they find that the goat has wreaked havoc. Despite saving them, Guillermo still feels frustrated at his perception as just a familiar. After leaving the samples with the witches, Guillermo converses with the goat, Black Peter, who is frustrated by the amount of work he does as a witch's familiar and yearns to become a witch.

== Production ==
=== Development ===
In May 2020, FX confirmed that the ninth episode of the season would be titled "Witches", and that it would be written by William Meny, and directed by producer Kyle Newacheck. This was Meny's first writing credit, and Newacheck's fourth directing credit.

== Reception ==
=== Viewers ===
In its original American broadcast, "Witches" was seen by an estimated 0.433 million household viewers with a 0.15 in the 18-49 demographics. This means that 0.15 percent of all households with televisions watched the episode. This was a slight decrease in viewership from the previous episode, which was watched by 0.443 million household viewers with a 0.17 in the 18-49 demographics.

With DVR factored in, the episode was watched by 0.922 million viewers with a 0.3 in the 18-49 demographics.

=== Critical reviews ===
"Witches" received positive reviews from critics. Katie Rife of The A.V. Club gave the episode a "B" grade and wrote, "It's downright trendy to be a witch in 2020. I myself admit to having an Instagram feed full of cauldrons and sigils that are really just elaborately staged ads for bath salts — one of the sharper details of this week’s episode of What We Do In The Shadows. 'Self-care' comes up a few times in 'Witches,' and it's true that modern-day witches’ potions are more likely to be of the moisturizing and/or exfoliating variety than anything involving toad-foot powder or the blood of an unbaptized infant."

Tony Sokol of Den of Geek gave the episode a 4 star rating out of 5 and wrote, "'Witches' works because the magic works. It's amusing to see our friends outmatched and clueless. They are always out of their element, so there is some reassurance in the consistency of old foes. The vampires and their sworn enemies are bonded in the business of bodily fluids, and I hope we see more of the Witches." Greg Wheeler of The Review Geek gave the episode a 3.5 star rating out of 5 and wrote, "While the actual drama surrounding the witches revels in its crudeness right the way through, it's the overarching narrative and progressing storyline surrounding Guillermo that's ultimately the most interesting part of this episode."
