= The Prisoner (What We Do in the Shadows) =

- What We Do in the Shadows episode
- Episode no.: Season 3 Episode 1
- Directed by: Kyle Newacheck
- Written by: Paul Simms
- Cinematography by: DJ Stipsen
- Editing by: Yana Gorskaya; Dane McMaster
- Production code: XWS03001
- Original air date: September 2, 2021
- Running time: 24 minutes

Guest appearances
- Taika Waititi as Viago von Dorna Schmarten Scheden Heimburg; Kristen Schaal as The Guide

Episode chronology
← Previous "Nouveau Théâtre des Vampires"	Next → "The Cloak of Duplication"

"The Prisoner" is the first episode of the third season of the American mockumentary comedy horror television series What We Do in the Shadows, set in the franchise of the same name. It is the 21st overall episode of the series and was written by executive producer Paul Simms, and directed by co-executive producer Kyle Newacheck. It was released on FX on September 2, 2021, airing back-to-back with the follow-up episode, "The Cloak of Duplication".

The series is set in Staten Island, New York City. Like the 2014 film, the series follows the lives of vampires in the city. These consist of three vampires, Nandor, Laszlo, and Nadja. They live alongside Colin Robinson, an energy vampire; and Guillermo, Nandor's familiar. The series explores the absurdity and misfortunes experienced by the vampires. In the episode, the vampires debate on what to do with Guillermo, just as they receive important news.

According to Nielsen Media Research, the episode was seen by an estimated 0.498 million household viewers and gained a 0.18 ratings share among adults aged 18–49. The episode received extremely positive reviews from critics, who praised the new status quo, potential storylines and humor.

== Plot ==
29 days after the massacre at the theater, the vampires are still unsure on what to do with Guillermo (Harvey Guillén). Nandor (Kayvan Novak) believes they could use him to protect themselves, but Laszlo (Matt Berry) and Nadja (Natasia Demetriou) are convinced that he will kill them given the chance. Guillermo has been kept in a cage in the basement, only being provided raw chicken to eat. Unbeknownst to them, Guillermo can easily leave his cage to perform his household duties.

Having installed cameras, Guillermo leaves the basement when a ghost arrives at the house. The ghost reveals itself to be The Guide (Kristen Schaal), who claims that she has been trying to contact the vampires. She is a messenger from the Supreme Worldwide Vampiric Council, which is the leader among the councils. She shows them a video, where Viago (Taika Waititi) explains that Guillermo killed almost 70% of the vampires in the area. Therefore, he has appointed Nandor, Laszlo, Nadja and Colin Robinson (Mark Proksch) to serve as leaders of the Vampiric Council of the Eastern Seaboard of the New World.

The vampires then decide to integrate Guillermo in their team, where he will serve as their bodyguard. To make sure he won't kill them, they perform a dangerous four-way hynopsis on Guillermo. They perform it, unaware that hynopsis stopped working for Guillermo a long time ago. They then visit the headquarters, where they are astounded to find the Master's Throne. She informs them that while they are all leaders, only one of them can be the Supreme Leader. The vampires then start questioning who will be in charge, as Colin Robinson tries to seize the throne.

== Production ==
=== Development ===
In August 2021, FX confirmed that the first episode of the season would be titled "The Prisoner", and that it would be written by executive producer Paul Simms, and directed by co-executive producer Kyle Newacheck. This was Simms' fifth writing credit, and Newacheck's sixth directing credit.

== Reception ==
=== Viewers ===
In its original American broadcast, "The Prisoner" was seen by an estimated 0.498 million household viewers with a 0.18 in the 18-49 demographics. This means that 0.18 percent of all households with televisions watched the episode. This was a 22% increase in viewership from the previous episode, which was watched by 0.406 million household viewers with a 0.17 in the 18-49 demographics.

=== Critical reviews ===
"The Prisoner" received extremely positive reviews from critics. Katie Rife of The A.V. Club gave the episode an "A–" grade and wrote, "What We Do In The Shadows successfully kept its momentum going with a focused, character-driven arc in its second season, and while the characters are still jockeying for power in these first two episodes of season three, there’s a relaxed confidence to the writing and performances that comes with not just living up to expectations, but exceeding them."

Tony Sokol of Den of Geek gave the episode a 4 star rating out of 5 and wrote, "'The Prisoner,' which was written by Paul Simms and directed by Kyle Newacheck, is a fast-moving opener to what looks to be a brisk season of transitions. Guillermo remains vertical but gets a lateral promotion. Three of the four vampires get to vie for local power, and one gets to spend more time in the potting shed." Greg Wheeler of The Review Geek gave the episode a 4 star rating out of 5 and wrote, "This series has always been smartly written and that much is especially evident here, with jokes that land perfectly. The whole Colin Robinson poop bucket joke is a little drawn out though, if we're being overly critical, but it's a minor point in what’s otherwise a very good opening chapter."

Melody McCune of Telltale TV gave the episode a 4.5 star rating out of 5 and wrote, "'The Prisoner' continues to maintain the momentum established in the Season 2 finale. What We Do in the Shadows boasts one of the best casts on TV and, while its style of humor falls on the dry side, each performer brings something different comedically to the table." Alejandra Bodden of Bleeding Cool gave the episode a 9 out of 10 rating and wrote, "The new season of What We Do in the Shadows definitely started off with a bang. I am loving how Nandor has changed toward Guillermo and how their relationship seems to have gotten much better and less strained."
