= The Fabulous Furry Freak Brothers =

American comic book

Fabulous Furry Freak Brothers
- The Fabulous Furry Freak Brothers #1, Feb. 1971 by Gilbert Shelton

Publication information
- Publisher: Rip Off Press
- Publication date: February 1971 – 1997
- No. of issues: 14

Creative team
- Created by: Gilbert Shelton

The Fabulous Furry Freak Brothers is an underground comic about a fictional trio of stoner characters, created by the American artist Gilbert Shelton. The Freak Brothers first appeared in The Rag, an underground newspaper published in Austin, Texas, beginning in May 1968, and were regularly reprinted in underground publications around the United States and in other parts of the world. Later their adventures were published in a series of comic books.

The lives of the Freak Brothers revolve around the procurement and enjoyment of recreational drugs, particularly marijuana, while avoiding run-ins with law enforcement. The comics present a critique of the establishment while satirizing the counterculture.

Fat Freddy's Cat appears in many of the stories, spinning off his own cartoon strip (which appeared as part of the Freak Brothers comic page, in the manner of older comic strip double features) and later some full-length episodes.

An animated TV series adaptation, The Freak Brothers, was released on Tubi on November 14, 2021.

== Publication history ==
The Freak Brothers first appeared in The Rag, an underground newspaper published in Austin, Texas, beginning in May 1968. Their debut was in an advertising flyer for a winter 1968 film short called The Texas Hippies March on the Capitol. Freak Brothers strips soon became popular and, thanks to the Underground Press Syndicate, were regularly reprinted in underground papers around the United States and in other parts of the world.

The Freak Brothers' first comic book appearance was in Feds 'n' Heads, self-published by Shelton in the spring of 1968 (and later re-issued in multiple printings by Berkeley's the Print Mint). They also appeared in the first two issues of Jay Lynch's Bijou Funnies. In 1969 Shelton and three friends from Texas founded Rip Off Press in San Francisco, which took over publication of all subsequent Freak Brothers comics. The first compilation of their adventures, The Collected Adventures of the Fabulous Furry Freak Brothers, had its first printing in 1971 and has been continually in print ever since.

A weekly Freak Brothers comic strip was syndicated by Rip Off Press to underground and student publications in the 1970s, along with the related strip Fat Freddy's Cat. In addition to those strips, new adventures appeared in magazines such as Playboy, High Times, and Rip Off Comix; these too were collected in comic book form. Shelton continued to write and draw the series until 1992, in collaboration with Dave Sheridan (1974 – 1982) and Paul Mavrides (1978 – 1992). In 1971 the Register and Tribune Syndicate offered to distribute the comic strip nationally if Shelton were to make substantial changes to make it more marketable to general audiences. Shelton refused without inquiring into the changes, one of which was to "substantially revise" the references to drugs and drug culture.

The majority of the comic books consist of one or more multi-page stories together with a number of one-page strips; many of the latter have a one-row skit featuring Fat Freddy's Cat at the bottom of the page. Issues #8-10 contained only the long-form story "The Idiots Abroad", which The Comics Journal listed as #44 of the "100 Greatest Comics of the Century." The UK newspaper The Guardian said of a 2003 reprint of the story that, "The graphic quality is, even in slightly muddy reproduction, astonishing. Depictions of various European cities recall Hergé in their accuracy and detail ... As for the subject matter, considering the dates of composition, it has hardly dated."

== Characters ==
The Fabulous Furry Freak Brothers, from left to right, Phineas, Fat Freddy, and Freewheelin' Franklin

The Freak Brothers are not siblings. They are a threesome of freaks (similar to, but distinct from, hippies) from San Francisco.

- Freewheelin' Franklin Freek, although laid-back, is the most street-smart of the trio and he appears to be several years older than the others. In one story, he reveals that he grew up in an orphanage and never knew his parents. Tall and skinny, he has a big bulbous nose, a waterfall mustache and a ponytail. He wears cowboy boots and a cowboy hat. In one strip, he runs into an ex-girlfriend who has a child that bears a striking resemblance to him. He does his best to evade them and is relieved when she does not recognize him. In another strip, when he meets his own (possible) father, the same plot is inverted. Depending on the level of colorization used in the strip in question, Franklin's hair is red, blonde, or light brown.
- Phineas T. Phreak is the intellectual and idealist of the group. He has enough mastery of chemistry to create new drugs and takes an avid interest in politics. Of the three, he is the most committed to social change and environmental issues. He is from Texas and while his mother is relaxed and open-minded, his father is a card-carrying member of the John Birch Society. He is the hairiest of the brothers—tall and skinny with a thick bush of black hair, a beard, a nose bearing more than a passing resemblance to a joint, and glasses. He is the stereotypical left-wing radical, bearing a superficial resemblance to Abbie Hoffman or Jerry Rubin.
- Fat Freddy Freekowtski is the least intelligent of the trio and has a preoccupation with food. He has curly yellow hair and a mustache. His compulsion to eat is the subject of several of the group's adventures. Fat Freddy frequently gets "burned" during drug transactions; when he does manage to "score" he typically loses the drugs in various ways, such as by dumping them out of a shopping bag in front of a cooling fan, which then blows them out the window onto a police car. Fat Freddy comes from an unexceptional large family in Cleveland. In The Idiots Abroad, Freddy visits the Polish village of Gfatsk, where everybody happens to look like him. He is driven away by an angry mob as soon as they hear the name Freekowtski.

Other recurring characters include:

- Dealer McDope, one of the trio's drug dealers. He is often mentioned in the strips but is seldom seen. The character was initially created by Dave Sheridan for the Rip Off Press title Mother's Oats Comix.
- Hiram "Country" Cowfreak, a hippy who grows vast quantities of marijuana at his isolated farmstead. He is referred to as the Freak Brothers' "cousin".
- Norbert the Nark, an inept DEA agent who is continually trying, and failing, to arrest the Freak Brothers.
- Tricky Prickears, the star of a comic book within the comic that the Freak Brothers enjoy reading. He is billed as "The Freak Brothers' favorite law enforcement officer". Tricky is a blind, deaf and reactionary detective and is a parody of Dick Tracy, to the extent that Shelton drew his stories in a different style, resembling that of Tracy's creator Chester Gould.
- Governor Rodney Richpigge, a stereotypically rich, corrupt politician whom the Freak Brothers hold in general contempt. The governor's son is a cocaine dealer.

== Fat Freddy's Cat ==
Fat Freddy's Cat

Publication information
- First appearance: 1969
- Created by: Gilbert Shelton

In-story information
- Species: Tabby cat
- Place of origin: San Francisco
- Team affiliations: The Fabulous Furry Freak Brothers
- Partnerships: Fat Freddy Freekowtski

Fat Freddy's Cat is a fictional orange tabby cat, nominally belonging to Fat Freddy.

=== Characterization ===
The Cat is depicted as being much smarter than Freddy. He shares many of the same preoccupations as his owner, such as drugs, food, sleep and sex. The Cat is frequently depicted as regarding the Freak Brothers, especially Freddy, with amused contempt, frequently expressed by defecating in inappropriate places, such as Freddy's pillow or his stereo headphones. Two ongoing jokes with the series center upon Fat Freddy's laziness resulting in him not naming the cat as well as the neglect and abuse that occurs from the Brothers' lifestyle.

In the strips the Cat is shown to have three "nephews", to whom he tells various stories, which occasionally form the basis of individual storylines. One storyline features him playing the role of "F. Frederick Skitty", an undercover agent sworn to stop the distribution of "Tee Hee Hee", a drug that turns people into homosexuals. Another story involves a scheme by Fat Freddy to replicate Dick Whittington's success and sell the Cat to the (fictional) small, oil-rich nation of Pootweet to deal with mice.

=== Appearances ===
Fat Freddy's Cat first appeared in 1969 in underground newspapers as a character in The Fabulous Furry Freak Brothers strip. He soon gained his own small spin-off topper strip, in imitation of the early Krazy Kat strips below The Family Upstairs by George Herriman. The Cat has also received independent appearances and storylines of his own. Single line segments appeared in student newspapers in Australia in the 1970s.

Many of these strips have been collected in comic book form by Rip Off Press in a series of The Fabulous Furry Freak Brothers compilations and later The Adventures of Fat Freddy's Cat, which ran for four small size issues in the 1970s. Fat Freddy's Comics and Stories (one-shot, 1983) also included several stories about the Cat.

The Adventures of Fat Freddy's Cat were reprinted and expanded (starting over from #1) in six comic book size issues in the 1980s. They included new longer stories about the Cat. A seventh edition was released (in the US only) in 1993. After the demise of the underground newspaper, the Cat continued to appear in various comic books. His last appearance to date was in a 1990 strip reprinted in The Fabulous Furry Freak Brothers #12.

=== Adaptations ===
Fat Freddy's Cat is voiced by Tiffany Haddish in the animated series The Freak Brothers, which debuted in 2020, and is commonly called Kitty by Fat Freddy. This version of the character is female and is capable of conversing directly with the Freaks whom she once again has a habit of insulting and belittling. She can apparently handle weed much better than them, though this did not prevent her from having the ultimate high that sent them from 1969 to 2020.

== Storylines and themes ==
Fat Freddy, with his cat

Drug use is the predominant theme that runs throughout all volumes of this title. The protagonists "live in a state of blissful torpor relieved only by bursts of paranoia or stimulant-induced frenzy." Marijuana is the most frequently mentioned, but numerous other stimulants and hallucinogens are mentioned as well. Heroin is usually missing from the list. In one adventure, Franklin is shown to turn down an offer of "smack" when hitching a ride.

Food is a recurring subject. These stories most often involve Fat Freddy and his marijuana-induced "munchies" (increased appetite). The squalor engendered by the Brothers' indolence is often highlighted; several strips feature the household's cockroach population, ruled over by a fascist monarchy. Several stories satirize governments, particularly the U.S. government. These stories invariably show politicians and their agents as corrupt, incompetent, or both. The theme of foreign travel is sometimes explored, most notably in the three-part Idiots Abroad series.

It is common for the storylines to begin with an air of realism, but rapidly descend into comic pantomime.

Classic Freak Brothers stories include:

- Grass Roots: The Brothers find a year's supply of cocaine and move to the country with the proceeds. They snort it all in two days. The Brothers are joined by a trio of hippie women who join them in their misadventures: the dilapidated farmhouse, Freddy's run in with a hillbilly moonshiner, the rumor of gold on the property, and Phineas running for sheriff.
- Chariot of the Globs: Fat Freddy's Cat is abducted by aliens.
- The Fabulous Furry Freak Brothers in the 21st Century: The Brothers experience life in the future.
- Knock 'em Dead: The Brothers form a punk band.
- The 7th Voyage of the Fabulous Furry Freak Brothers: A Mexican Odyssey: The Brothers holiday in Mexico, are thrown in jail and escape with the help of shaman Don Longjuan, in an oblique parody of the Carlos Castaneda books.
- The Idiots Abroad: The Brothers are split up attempting to travel to Colombia hoping to score cheap dope down there, yet none of them manages to reach Bogotá; Fat Freddy accidentally joins a group of nuclear terrorists in Scotland before disrupting the International Workers' Day military parade in Moscow, USSR and being subsequently sold to slavery in Africa; Franklin is almost killed by a native apocalyptic South American cult before joining a group of pirates; while Phineas ends up in Mecca and becomes the world's richest man after founding a new religion.

== Adaptations ==
Still from Grass Roots

Another still featuring the film's logo

=== Film ===
In 1978, the Fabulous Furry Freak Brothers appeared - unauthorized - in the full-length pornographic film Up in Flames. The story involves the brothers' attempts to raise cash to make their rent deadline (the trio being in danger of being evicted from their apartment). Fat Freddy gains employment at a local food store run by graphic artist Robert Crumb's character Mr. Natural.

Multiple attempts have been made to create an official film adaptation of the series, but none have been successful. In 1979, Universal Studios paid Shelton and Rip Off Press $250,000 for the rights to make a live-action Fabulous Furry Freak Brothers film. Shelton received the bulk of the money, which enabled him to live part-time in Europe. Meanwhile, the Universal-produced Freak Brothers film never made it to the production stage. Film Roman attempted to create an animated feature film based on the series, which they announced in 1999. If successful, the film would have been directed by Mike B. Anderson, who had also intended to help develop the script.

In 2006 Celluloid Dreams, along with bolexbrothers and X Filme, began work on a feature-length clay animation film based on the series called Grass Roots. Per Variety, film had a budget of US$22.5 million and was to have been directed by David Borthwick. A promo reel of the film along with a first draft of the script was shown at Cannes and test animation was also released on Celluloid Dreams's official website. No further announcements about the film were made and in 2019 Cartoon Brew considered the project to have been likely shelved. The film's script would have had the Freak Brothers moving to the country to open a commune and grow weed, unaware that they were in the possession of genetically modified weed created by the government. Characters in the film would have included Norbert the Nark, as well as three women who joined the commune but have different opinions on the free love philosophy due to changing gender politics.

=== Television ===
An animated television series adaptation titled The Freak Brothers, based on the characters and set in modern San Francisco, was released on Tubi on November 14, 2021. The series was preceded on May 6, 2020, by a mini-episode titled "Kentucky Fried Freaks". The series features Woody Harrelson, Pete Davidson, John Goodman, and Tiffany Haddish as voice actors for the three Freaks and the cat respectively. Courtney Solomon and Mark Canton serve as executive producers, with Jeffrey Scott Edell serving as Co-Executive Producer, alongside Adam DeVine and Blake Anderson who also provide voice acting. The series is animated by Pure Imagination Studios and Starburns Industries studio, which also worked on Rick and Morty. In May 2022, the series was renewed for a second season. The series was released on digital on April 17, 2023 by Lionsgate.

== In popular culture ==
=== Music and entertainment ===
Fat Freddy's Drop, formed in the late 1990s, is a Wellington, New Zealand, band that took its name from the Freak Brothers comics. According to the band, individual doses of a certain type of LSD popular in Wellington at that time had the image of Fat Freddy's Cat printed on it. Dropping—common slang for taking LSD—Fat Freddies became the inspiration for the band's name. The comic was also used as the namesake for a late-night radio show that ran on KTKT in Tucson, Arizona during the 1960s.

Director Paul Thomas Anderson said the look of Joaquin Phoenix's lead character, Larry "Doc" Sportello, in Anderson's 2014 adaptation of the Thomas Pynchon novel Inherent Vice, was based in part on Freewheelin' Franklin Freek:

"[T]here's this documentary on Daniel Ellsberg, called The Most Dangerous Man in America. There's a great picture of a buddy of his who has this great set of glasses, a floppy hat and these mutton chops. I took a still frame from that and I sent it to [Phoenix], along with the omnibus collection of The Fabulous Furry Freak Brothers comic, by Gilbert Shelton—and that's probably the most we really talked about [Phoenix's portrayal of the character]".

The popular 8-bit computer game Jet Set Willy has a room named "We Must Perform a Quirkafleeg" in honour of this strip.

The science fiction novel Scam Artists of the Galaxy (2020) contains a location named Fat Freddy's Restaurant with a supercilious mostly orange cat. This novel's sequel, Election Matters: Life on Universityworld (2022), sees the cat and one of its kittens appear.

=== Sports ===
The ultra supporters of Serie B Italian football (soccer) team Ternana Calcio, from the Italian Umbrian city of Terni are called "The Freak Brothers". Like many Italians ultras, they are linked with the political left.

=== Places ===
Fat Freddy's Restaurant, in Galway, Ireland, has arcana and other memorabilia relating to the Fabulous Furry Freak Brothers and Fat Freddy's Cat. There is also an inn in Olongapo, Philippines, called "The Fabulous Furry Freak Brothers Stagger Inn".

=== Science ===
At the Le Havre Normandy University, Claire Bowen analysed the timeless appeal and current relevance of the Freak Brothers comics in the American counter-culture of the 1970s. Chiara Polli at the University of Messina conducted semiotic studies of a selection of Italian translations of the Freak Brothers Comics, using isotopies as a key tool in the analysis of comics in translation.

=== Other ===
In 1977 Shelton illustrated the cover of the February issue of High Times magazine. The characters would be featured again on cover for the November 1990 issue and in 2022, the magazine released a limited edition merchandise collaboration to honor the 45th anniversary of the 1977 cover.

In 2024 the cannabis brand Cookies announced a collaboration with The Freak Brothers and that they would release a pre-roll named the "LSD Joint". The product featured the logo from the animated series.

== Bibliography ==
=== The Fabulous Furry Freak Brothers series ===
Almost all of the titles in the series have a title in words. Issues #0–7 and #12–13 are in black and white; issues #8–11 were produced in both color and black-and-white editions.

- Freak Brothers No. 0: Underground Classics #1 (Jan. 1985)
- Freak Brothers No. 1: The Collected Adventures Of... (1971)
- Freak Brothers No. 2: Further Adventures of those... (Mar. 1972)
- Freak Brothers No. 3: A Year Passes Like Nothing (1973)
- Freak Brothers No. 4: Brother, Can You Spare 75¢ for the... (Nov. 1975)
- Freak Brothers No. 5: Grass Roots (May 1977)
- Freak Brothers No. 6: Six Snappy Sockeroos (June 1980)
- Freak Brothers No. 7: Several Short Stories (1982)
- Freak Brothers No. 8: The Idiots Abroad, Part I (1984)
- Freak Brothers No. 9: The Idiots Abroad, Part II (1985)
- Freak Brothers No. 10: The Idiots Abroad, Part III (1989)
- Freak Brothers No. 11 (1990)
- Freak Brothers No. 12 (1992)
- Freak Brothers No. 13 (1997)—black-and-white reprints of stories from Thoroughly Ripped (Rip Off Press, 1978) plus a new cover and one story never before printed in the U.S.: "The Plant"
- Fifty Freakin' Years with the Fabulous Furry Freak Brothers (Knockabout Comics, 2017)—new strips by Shelton, as well as his written introduction

=== Compilations and collections ===
Several compilation titles have been published that merge several of the original titles into one book.

- Thoroughly Ripped with the Fabulous Furry Freak Brothers and Fat Freddy's Cat! (Rip Off Press, 1978) ISBN 0-89620-077-9—full-color collection of stories from High Times magazine published from Dec. 1976 to Sept. 1978 (as well as one story from Playboy magazine). Book came in two editions, one of which included a board game called "It's a Raid".
- The Fabulous Furry Freak Brothers in Grass Roots (Rip Off Press, 1984) ISBN 0-89620-090-6—full-color reprints of material from comic book issues #5 and 7.
- The Complete Fabulous Furry Freak Brothers, Volume One (Knockabout Comics, 2001) ISBN 0-86166-146-X—reprints comic book issues #0–7 and 12
- The Complete Fabulous Furry Freak Brothers, Volume Two (Knockabout Comics, 2004) ISBN 0-86166-149-4—color reprints comic books issues #8-11 and 13. (Note: according to the reverse title pages, the second volume has the same ISBN 0-86166-146-X)
- The Fabulous Furry Freak Brothers Omnibus (Knockabout Comics, 2008) ISBN 978-0-86166-159-6—collection of the entire series, including some stories and covers done after publication of the "Complete" books. Includes everything from the two books above, except for the covers of Rip Off Comics 15 and 21, which do not show the Freak Brothers.
- The Fabulous Furry Freak Brothers (Fantagraphics Books, 2022-2026) a 7 volume hardback collection of the complete FFFB and Fat Freddy's Cat.
