= TMNT Summer Shorts =

American animated web series

- Genre: Anthology; Superhero
- Based on: Characters created by Peter Laird and Kevin Eastman
- Starring: Various
- Country of origin: United States
- Original language: English
- No. of episodes: 12

Production
- Production company: Nickelodeon Animation Studio

Original release
- Network: YouTube
- Release: July 23, 2016 – January 4, 2018

TMNT Summer Shorts is an American animated anthology of shorts that was released on Nickelodeon's YouTube channel from 2016 to 2018. Produced by Nickelodeon Animation Studio, the shorts present different takes on the Teenage Mutant Ninja Turtles franchise and its characters, and were helmed by various creative teams and animation vendors.

== Production and release ==
At San Diego Comic-Con (SDCC) in August 2016, Nickelodeon unveiled three Teenage Mutant Ninja Turtles animated short films, each set in a different continuity and helmed by a different creative. This first batch included "Don vs. Raph" directed by Sung Jin Ahn, written by Jhonen Vasquez, and animated by Titmouse, Inc.; "Turtles Take Time (and Space)" written and directed by Rie Koga and Brandon Auman, and animated by Studio Mir; and "Pizza Friday" directed by Paul Jenkins, written by Jenkins and Kevin Eastman, and animated by House of Cool.

In June 2017, a new batch of shorts was released, and them along with the SDCC 2016 shorts were placed under the retroactive title, TMNT Summer Shorts. These included "We Strike Hard and Fade Away into the Night" written and directed by Kevin R. Adams and Joe Ksander, and animated by Titmouse; "Teenage Mecha Ninja Turtles" written and directed by Matt Youngberg, and animated by DNA productions with additional work by Peter Chung; five "TMNT Team Up!" shorts written and directed by Gary Doodles and Tommy Sica, and animated by Doodles (including an SDCC 2017 bonus episode); and "Boulangerie". Both AIPT and MiscRave noted that several shorts in Nickelodeon's 2017 promo have remained unreleased.

Titmouse co-founder Chris Prynoski described the shorts they worked on for the project as a "labor of love", and one they took on simply because it appealed to them. Each short took approximately 20 to 25 weeks for Titmouse to produce. Responding to the question of whether any of the shorts would be adapted to a full series Pryonski stated: "I think the style will be too difficult to execute on a regular basis as a series".

== Episodes ==
No.	Title	Directed by	Written by	Animated by	Original release date
1	"Don vs. Raph"	Sung Jin Ahn	Jhonen Vasquez	Titmouse, Inc.	July 23, 2016
After getting into a petty squabble with one another, Donatello and Raphael engage in a variety of competitions to settle their conflict. This includes playing video games, making armpit fart noises, baking, hand shadows, eating spicy food, stacking minature blocks of wood, dress-up, jump rope, and thumb wrestling. Cast : Raphael (Adam DeVine), Leonardo (Anders Holm), Michelangelo (Blake Anderson), Donatello (Eric Bauza), Splinter / Shredder (Matthew Yang King)
2	"Turtles Take Time (and Space)"	Rie Koga	Brandon Auman	Studio Mir	July 23, 2016
April brings a magical Time Scepter to the Turtles' lair. Michelangelo plays with it and accidentally sends himself and his brothers upon a ship during the Pirate Age. After meeting with an ascendant of April and battling with a rival Pirate crew, they are transported into the pet shop they originated from where they are once again unmutated babies. After some mishaps, they are transported to an alternate reality where they take muscular forms and duel with the Shredder. Finally they are transported to the 1987 TV series reality. Cast : Raphael (Darren Criss), Donatello / Pirate #1 (Scott Menville), Leonardo (Eric Bauza), Michelangelo (Greg Cipes), 1980s Michelangelo / Pirate Captain (Townsend Coleman), April / Pirate April (Jessica McKenna), Shredder (Brian Bloom)
3	"Pizza Friday"	Paul Jenkins	Paul Jenkins and Kevin Eastman	House of Cool	July 23, 2016
Using Donatello's cloaking device, the Turtles disguise themselves as humans, and with April, sneak into her high school in order to experience Pizza Friday. In the cafetaria, they encounter a group of strange speaking students who turn out to be Krang aliens similarly using cloaking technology to disguise themselves. Both the Turtles and Krang are exposed and they duel it out, before both fleeing the scene. Cast : Donatello (A. J. LoCascio), Raphael (Sam Riegel), Leonardo (Yuri Lowenthal), Michelangelo (Zach Callison), April / Girls (Courtney Eastman), Krang / Strange Student (Jason Canning)
4	"Teenage Mecha Ninja Turtles"	Matt Youngberg	Matt Youngberg	DNA Production Co., Ltd. Peter Chung (additional animation)	June 5, 2017
It is 2090 in New York City, and humans and mutants seemingly co-exist in peace. A bank robbery is underway by a pack of mutant dogs, but before they can flee the scene they are stopped by Frida, Jackson, Basque, and Kusama, four human teenagers piloting mech suits resembling turtles.While Frida and Jackson bicker, the pack leader, Grimm, finds and enters a large construction mech and a battle ensues. After settling their differences and finally acting as a unit, the teenagers defeat Grimm and tie him up with rest of his pack for the police to reprimand. Back at their lair the teenagers celebrate, and their master, an older Michelangelo, congratulates them. Cast : Michelangelo (Greg Cipes), Frida (America Young), Jackson (Eric Artel), Basque (Khary Payton), Kusama (Tania Gunadi), Jester Joe / Grimm (Eric Bauza), Jester Jim / Sgt. Swat (David Kaye)
5	"No Fly Zone"	Gary Doodles and Tommy Sica	Gary Doodles and Tommy Sica	Gary Doodles	June 12, 2017
This is the first entry in the TMNT Team Up! subseries created by Gary Doodles and Tommy Sica. It consists of four comedic short stories: The Shredder and Turtles roast each other via text messaging.; Splinter karate chopping wooden planks in a construction shop much to the managers dismay.; Bebop and Rocksteady perform a song about their friendship.; Baxter Stockman accidentally smashes against the Party Van's windshield.; Cast : Tommy Sica, Gary Doodles, Cassandra Sica
6	"Boulangerie"	N/A	N/A	N/A	June 18, 2017
The Turtles in disguise try to buy snacks from a French bakery.
7	"Flora the Fedora"	Gary Doodles and Tommy Sica	Gary Doodles and Tommy Sica	Gary Doodles	June 26, 2017
This is the second entry in the TMNT Team Up! subseries created by Gary Doodles and Tommy Sica. It consists of six comedic short stories: The Turtles, in the Turtle Van, drive into a large pothole; Michelangelo gets stuck in a pipe and April, unknowingly, tries to plunge him out; Shredder tries and fails to fly; Krang goes boop; Bebop and Rocksteady watch television; The Turtles eat chinese food; Cast : Tommy Sica, Gary Doodles, Cassandra Sica
8	"We Strike Hard & Fade Into the Night"	Kevin R. Adams and Joe Ksander	Kevin R. Adams and Joe Ksander	Titmouse, Inc.	July 10, 2017
In a moving train in the subways of New York City, April is holding a cansiter containing a glowing crytsal with ooze-like properties. The train is hijacked by Foot Clan ninjas. Leonardo saves April and on the roof the train, the Turtles and April are confronted by more ninjas as well as Mouser robots. One Mouser steals the canister and brings it to Krang, who is inside a runaway Techno Cosmic Research Institute (TCRI) vehicle. The Turtles battle Krang and hijack the vehicle, before reuniting with April who is fighting off Foot ninjas using mutant tentacles courtesy of the canister. The tentacles soon spiiral out of her control and the Turtles save her. Cast : Raphael (David Theune), Leonardo (Ryan Meharry), Michelangelo (Jacob Reed), Donatello (Adam McCabe), April (Lauren Lapkus), Krang (Betsy Sodaro)
9	"TMNT Team-Up!: Comic Con Exclusive"	Gary Doodles and Tommy Sica	Gary Doodles and Tommy Sica	Gary Doodles	July 18, 2017
This is a bonus entry in the TMNT Team Up! subseries created by Gary Doodles and Tommy Sica. It consists of three comedic short stories: A young fan at Comic Con meets Krang's robotic armor.; The Turtles go to Comic Con and meet their co-creator, Kevin Eastman.; Shredder and Krang meet Shredder cosplayers.; Cast : Tommy Sica, Gary Doodles, Cassandra Sica, Kevin Eastman
10	"Turtle: Impossible"	Gary Doodles and Tommy Sica	Gary Doodles and Tommy Sica	Gary Doodles	July 31, 2017
This is the third entry in the TMNT Team Up! subseries created by Gary Doodles and Tommy Sica. It consists of seven comedic short stories: The Turtles and April have a saturday night binge party.; The Turtles are driving in the Party Van before a giant mutant pigeon carries them away.; A Foot Ninja gets hit in the head by some shoes.; Splinter relays wisdom in a cage.; Ace Duck crashes into a pile of rubber ducks.; Shredder refuses his mother's invitation for dinner.; Donatello tries to diffuse a bomb.; Cast : Tommy Sica, Gary Doodles, Cassandra Sica
11	"Big Daddy's TV"	Gary Doodles and Tommy Sica	Gary Doodles and Tommy Sica	Gary Doodles	August 14, 2017
This is the fourth entry in the TMNT Team Up! subseries created by Gary Doodles and Tommy Sica. It consists of five comedic short stories: Leonardo answers the doorbell but his hit by a random subway train.; Shredder, Krang, Bebop, and Rocksteady watch TV on Shredder's new massive flat screen.; Michelangelo uses Donatello's computer.; Bebop and Rocksteady perform a song about their friendship.; The Turtles, April, and Casey drive in April's new car.; Cast : Tommy Sica, Gary Doodles, Cassandra Sica
12	"Krang On Idol"	Gary Doodles and Tommy Sica	Gary Doodles and Tommy Sica	Gary Doodles	January 4, 2018
This is the fifth and final entry in the TMNT Team Up! subseries created by Gary Doodles and Tommy Sica. It consists of six comedic short stories: Michelangelo parks the Party Van in a No Parking Zone and is abducted by aliens.; Shredder looks up bunions on the internet.; The Turtles are playing a game of Twister.; A little girl buys a Ninja Turtles ice pop.; Krang raps on Idol.; Leonardo dreams about Splinter.; Cast : Tommy Sica, Gary Doodles, Cassandra Sica

== Reception ==
Mark Pellegrini of AIPT thought of the shorts as a fun throwback to the guest artist issues of the original Turtles comics, though largely felt that the 2017 batch was a letdown compared to the 2016 one due to its lack of variety. He hailed "Don vs. Raph" as his favorite of the 2016 shorts for its kinetic pace and Jhonen Vasquez's trademark humor and visuals, and "We Strike Hard and Fade Away into the Night" as his favorite in 2017 for its similarly fast pace and stylish animation. MiscRave praised "Turtles Take Time (and Space)" for its lighthearted tone, action, and designs, and highlighted "We Strike Hard and Fade Away into the Night" and "Teenage Mecha Ninja Turtles" as additional favorites.
