= Flip Flop (Modern Family) =

- Modern Family episode
- Episode no.: Season 4 Episode 20
- Directed by: Gail Mancuso
- Written by: Jeffrey Richman; Bill Wrubel
- Production code: 4ARG19
- Original air date: April 10, 2013

Guest appearances
- Benjamin Bratt as Javier; Paget Brewster as Trish; Rob Riggle as Gil Thorpe; Anders Holm as Zack Barbie

Episode chronology
| ← Previous "The Future Dunphys" | Next → "Career Day" |
- Modern Family season 4

"Flip Flop" is the 20th episode of the fourth season of the American sitcom Modern Family, and the series' 92nd episode overall. It was aired on April 10, 2013. The episode was written by Jeffrey Richman and Bill Wrubel and it was directed by Gail Mancuso.

== Plot ==
The house that Claire (Julie Bowen) and Cam (Eric Stonestreet) were preparing for a flip is ready and they are also ready to start searching for a buyer. After turning down an offer from Gil (Rob Riggle), another real estate agent, they struggle to find a buyer. Luke (Nolan Gould) tells them that he has a friend, Zack Barbie (Anders Holm), who is looking for a house and Haley (Sarah Hyland) uses her social network skills to research about him and learn what he likes. After learning what they wanted, they all make the house perfect for him.

They arrange a date with Zack but during the house inspection, Cam mentions Zack's dog's name, something that makes Zack wonder how Cam knew something like that. When a little bit later Haley mentions his birthday too, he freaks out and leaves. Gil comes to gloat, but Phil (Ty Burrell) pretends that Cam and Mitchell are potential clients who are interested in the house. After seeing that, Gil is willing to renegotiate the price for his buyer and offers them a higher price.

Meanwhile, Gloria's (Sofía Vergara) ex-husband, Javier (Benjamin Bratt), introduces Gloria, Jay (Ed O'Neill) and Manny (Rico Rodriguez) to his new fiancée, Trish (Paget Brewster). Gloria is worried about being replaced by Trish when she sees how close Manny and Trish get due to their many common interests. When Javier proposes to Trish, Trish runs upstairs and locks herself in Manny's room. Gloria tries to talk to her and convince her to come out. During their discussion, Gloria finds out that the reason Trish does not want to marry Javier is because she feels like she can not live up to Gloria as a mother and as a wife. Hearing that, Gloria abandons her plan to scare her away and welcomes her to the family.

== Reception ==
=== Ratings ===
In its original American broadcast, "Flip Flop" was watched by 10.38 million; down 0.5 million from the previous episode.

=== Reviews ===
"Flip Flop" received generally positive reviews.

Donna Bowman of The A.V. Club gave an A− grade to the episode saying that the episode was made only to make you laugh. "“Flip Flop” seems like the kind of episode that gets made when the creative team doesn't think they can fail. It's full of broad gags and muttered asides and old-fashioned farce. It isn't concerned with appealing to desirable demographics or pushing envelopes. It's the kind of episode that gets made when the only thing the creative team wants to do is make each other laugh."

Victoria Leigh Miller from Yahoo! TV said that the episode was hilarious and truly memorable. "It was guest stars galore on Wednesday night's "Modern Family" when the family flipped out over a flipped house and a new female friend. The episode, titled "Flip Flop", featured family teamwork at its best and the return of Benjamin Bratt as Javier."

Michael Adams of 411mania gave the episode 8.5/10 saying that it was a fantastic episode. "Two main plot points, no wacky, craziness, just great writing and acting. [...] Everything about it was just so on point and hysterical, not to mention Rob Riggle was a guest star."

Wyner C of Two Cents TV gave a good review to the episode saying it was "cute" and it ended the house flipping story arc. "Families support each other through it all – they are our walking sticks. We need to move forward but they make the walk smoother, easier. Unfortunately, with their help, we are exposed to their opinions – wanted or not."

Leigh Raines from TV Fanatic rated the episode with 4/5 and Zach Dionne from the Vulture, rated the episode with 3/5.
