= The Freak Brothers =

American animated sitcom

- Genre: Adult animation; Animated sitcom
- Based on: The Fabulous Furry Freak Brothers by Gilbert Shelton
- Developed by: Daniel Lehrer; Jeremy Lehrer-Craiwer; Courtney Solomon; Alan R. Cohen; Alan Freedland
- Voices of: Pete Davidson; Woody Harrelson; John Goodman; Tiffany Haddish; Liza Del Mundo; Andrea Savage; La La Anthony; Phil LaMarr; Adam DeVine; Blake Anderson
- Theme music composer: Ray Vaughn
- Country of origin: United States
- Original language: English
- No. of seasons: 3
- No. of episodes: 22

Production
- Executive producers: Courtney Solomon; Mark Canton; Gary Raskin (Note: season 3-present); Alan R. Cohen; Alan Freedland; Woody Harrelson; Tiffany Haddish; Pete Davidson; Adam DeVine; Blake Anderson; James A. Fino (Note: season 1 only); Simon Ore Molina; Casey Rup; Joshua R. Wexler; Sanjee K. Gupta; Gilbert Shelton; Manfred Mroczkowski; Top Dawg; Daniel Lehrer (Note: Credited as co-executive producer.); Jeremy Lehrer-Craiwer; Jeffery S. Edell (Note: co-executive producer; season 1); Boyce Bugliari (Note: Credited as co-executive producer; season 2-present); Jamie McLaughln
- Production companies: Lionsgate Television; WTG Enterprises; Pure Imagination Studios (Note: season 1-2); Cineloop Studios (Note: season 3-present); Starburns Industries; Hooligan Animation

Original release
- Network: Tubi
- Release: November 14, 2021 – present

The Freak Brothers is an American adult animated sitcom based on the underground comic The Fabulous Furry Freak Brothers by Gilbert Shelton. The first season aired from November 14 to December 26, 2021 on the streaming service Tubi, and featured the voices of Pete Davidson, Woody Harrelson, and John Goodman as the titular Freak Brothers, with Tiffany Haddish voicing the brothers' cat. In May 2022, the show was renewed for a second season, which aired from June 25 to September 24, 2023. Season 3 was released on April 20, 2026.

== Synopsis ==
In 1969, during Woodstock and the "Summer of Love", (Note: The pilot episode names 1969 as the "Summer of Love"; the social phenomenon is historically considered to have occurred during 1967.) three stoners living in the Haight-Ashbury neighborhood of San Francisco, Phineas, Franklin, and Fat Freddy, obtain a chemical that will supposedly bring them a new and ultimate high. The high leaves them in stasis for fifty years and they awake in the year 2020.

The current homeowners (Harper and Noah Switzer) are initially startled to discover that the three had been living under their home, but they allow the Freak Brothers to remain and acclimate themselves to the vast changes that have occurred over the years. Franklin develops a romance with Gretchen, Harper's sister who also lives at the property.

== Cast ==
- Pete Davidson as Phineas T. Phreakears
- Woody Harrelson as Freewheelin' Franklin Freek
- John Goodman as Fat Freddy Freekowtski
- Tiffany Haddish as Kitty
- Liza Del Mundo as Camille Switzer
- Andrea Savage as Harper Switzer
- La La Anthony as Gretchen Switzer
- Phil LaMarr as Noah Switzer
- Adam DeVine as Chuck
- Blake Anderson as Charlie
- ScHoolboy Q as himself
- Danny Gendron as Chomsky

== Development and release ==
Plans to create a series based on Gilbert Shelton's underground comic The Fabulous Furry Freak Brothers were first announced at Comic-Con in 2019, where it was also announced that Davidson, Harrelson, and Goodman would voice the titular characters. The series, greenlit by WTG Enterprises, was slated for eight 22-minute episodes. The series was shopped around to various networks before it was picked up by Tubi, making it the first original animated series released by the platform. The show's theme was composed and performed by Ray Vaughn. In April 2021, it was announced that Lionsgate Television had picked up the series, with Savage and Anthony joining the cast.

While developing the first seasons, writers and crew noted there were elements of the original comic book series that needed to be toned down for the modern day. They used the "fish out of water" concept to comment on "'what's actually more screwed up now than it even was back then,' and vice versa," as executive producer Courtney Solomon put it in a 2022 interview with Animation World Nation. Solomon also noted that they treated some topics with caution in the first season, something that they planned on changing with future seasons. In May 2022, the show was renewed for a second season.

=== Release ===
The first two episodes premiered on Tubi on November 14, 2021. The remaining six episodes were then released on a weekly basis every Sunday.

== Episodes ==
=== Series overview ===
Season	Episodes		Originally released	
Season	Episodes		First released	Last released
Shorts	3		May 6, 2020	October 13, 2020
1	8		November 14, 2021	December 26, 2021
2	8	4	June 25, 2023	
2	8	4	September 24, 2023	
3	6		April 20, 2026	

=== Shorts (2020) ===
Prior to Tubi picking up the series, three mini-episodes written by Daniel and Jeremy Lehrer were released starting on May 6, 2020. Scenes from the mini episodes can be seen in the opening credits for the series, and the song featured in the third mini episode was reused for the pilot.

No.	Title	Original release date
1	"Kentucky Fried Freaks"	May 6, 2020
Having woken up 51 years in the future, the three Brothers learn that the recipe for Kentucky Fried Chicken has changed, and that Donald Trump has the only bucket of the true original recipe. They go to the White House and demand that he hand over the chicken. A fight ensues, and nuclear weapons are launched upon Washington DC. The episode ends with the Freak Brothers eating the chicken on top of the White House as the surrounding area is destroyed.
2	"Ryan & the Reefer Factory"	July 14, 2020
The Brothers are given the ability to tour Ryan's Reefer Factory, where they were planning on stealing the "Everlasting Doobie". They're greeted by Ryan Seacrest and distract him by pushing him into his ganja river. They make it to the doobie, but set off a weight sensitive alarm. They're confronted by Seacrest's forces, led by Peter Dinklage. Franklin unintentionally angers Dinklage, who attacks them with a sword. They are able to escape, but land in raw sewage. Seacrest briefly retrieves the doobie before it's retaken by Kitty.
3	"Are You Ready for an Edible"	October 13, 2020
In 1969, the three smoke a concoction created by Phineas, which physically teleports them to 2020. They immediately enter a dispensary, where they learn that weed is legal. They then take part in a song and dance routine about the joys of legal weed. The episode ends with them getting tasered by the police, revealing that they had ransacked the store while they imagined the song.

=== Season 1 (2021) ===
No. overall	No. in season	Title	Directed by	Written by	Original release date
1	1	"Pilot"	Dominic Polcino	Daniel Lehrer & Jeremy Lehrer-Graiwer	November 14, 2021
Franklin, Phineas, Freddy, and Kitty are hippies living in San Francisco during 1969. The four travel to Woodstock in search of Swami Bhajan, who is believed to hold the secret to the ultimate high. They obtain an elixir from him and return to their home in San Francisco, where they apply it to some weed and smoke it in their secret room - after which they go into a catatonic state for 51 years. When they awaken, they discover that everything has changed, and their home is now owned by Harper and Noah Switzer. They are thrown out of the home, despite the protestations of social-advocate lawyer Gretchen, Harper's sister who lives in the property's guest house.
2	2	"Squatters Rights"	Jeanette Moreno King	Alan R. Cohen & Alan Freedland	November 14, 2021
Now at risk of becoming homeless, the trio approach Gretchen for assistance remaining in the home. She files a legal case, arguing that since they always remained on the property, they are entitled to squatter's rights. Meanwhile, the trio decides to try traveling back in time by re-growing the weed they smoked years ago and also obtaining the elixir from the Swami, who now works as a greeter at a local big-box store. While they are successful in obtaining the weed and elixir, the attempt ultimately ends with them discovering that the combination only put them in stasis and did not cause them to time travel. Their appeal through the court is also met with failure, and Harper is allowed to evict the trio. This causes some momentary strife between Harper and Gretchen, which is only broken when Phineas comes to Harper's defense, stating that she is only doing this to protect her family. This compassion sways Harper, who allows the Brothers to remain tenants as long as they pay rent and remain in their underground room.
3	3	"The Expendables"	Juan Jose Meza-Leon	Daniel Lehrer & Jeremy Lehrer-Graiwer	November 28, 2021
In order to raise money for rent, the Brothers go out in search of jobs. Through Kitty's trickery, they end up gaining employment as astronauts with Jeff Bezos' Blue Origins, unaware that he plans on sending them on a one-way trip.
4	4	"Son of a Freak"	Dominic Polcino	John Altschuler & Dave Krinsky	November 28, 2021
While attending a UFC competition, Phineas discovers that one of the fighters bears a strong resemblance to him. After learning that the fighter has a lucrative career and is unaware of his father's identity, Phineas is more than happy to assume that the fighter is a child that he fathered in the 60s. The fighter then spends time around the Switzer household - in the process, developing a sexual relationship with Gretchen. This angers Franklin, as he has been developing feelings for Gretchen, which are implied to be mutual. Ultimately Franklin submits the fighter's DNA to a genealogical service, which matches him with his true father. The fighter then abandons Gretchen and Phineas, (the latter of whom had been training him), in favor of his biological father.
5	5	"Bo-Freakien Rap-Sody"	Dominic Polcino	Shira Hoffman	December 5, 2021
While in search of weed, the Brothers meet the rapper ScHoolboy Q. Their encounter is initially positive, however it quickly turns sour when Freddy crashes ScHoolboy Q's solid gold golf cart into a lake, and the rapper swears revenge until they have paid for the cart. This culminates in ScHoolboy Q kidnapping Kitty and several other cats that Gretchen had obtained for use in a therapy program involving ex-convicts. Hoping to impress Gretchen, Franklin pushes for the trio to raid ScHoolboy Q's yacht. They are inevitably caught and forced to roll joints until they have paid off Freddy's debt. They make short work of their task, impressing ScHoolboy Q. This peace is short-lived, as the Brothers end up sinking the yacht, reviving the rapper's grudge. Despite this, the Brothers manage to return the cats and save Gretchen's event.
6	6	"Gender Non-Binary"	Joe Ekers	Daniel Lehrer & Jeremy Lehrer-Graiwer	December 12, 2021
Phineas and Freddy attend a tech convention, where one exhibitor is promoting a line of detailed robot girlfriends that can provide companionship and sex. One of the robots, Tess, goes AWOL after seeing Phineas, who is initially unaware of her true nature, and quickly falls in love with her. When he discovers Tess's robot nature, Phineas is shocked, but ultimately determines this is irrelevant, because he enjoys her company. This joy is short-lived, as the exhibitor eventually reclaims and reprograms Tess, removing any memories she may have of Phineas. In the meantime, Freddy starts a relationship with a sex worker claiming to be a robot. She eventually admits to her own farce when she discovers that her treatment is not worth any potential money, and that she will never receive any money from Freddy. Meanwhile, Franklin has joined Gretchen's book group in an attempt to attract her attention, but instead ends up sexually attracting all of her friends. Noticing her nonchalance at discovering him in a sexual situation with one of the women, Franklin pursues sexual relationships with the other book group members. This eventually turns exploitative, as all of the women see him as a tool to be used for their sexual pleasure - as opposed to a person in his own right. Gretchen ultimately comes to his rescue and scolds the others for treating him as a "dildo in a cowboy hat.” When pressed about her own feelings, Gretchen admits her attraction to Franklin.
7	7	"The Candidate"	Dominic Polcino	Alan R. Cohen & Alan Freedland	December 19, 2021
Harper and Gretchen find themselves at odds over San Francisco's mayoral race, as each backs an opposing candidate. Gretchen finds herself without a candidate when hers withdraws, as he is canceled by the public after a compromising photo is discovered. Freddy, at Franklin's insistence, ends up becoming the new party candidate after a video of him bathing goes viral. Phineas is irritated by the entire process, and refuses to vote, claiming he was soured on politics in the 1960s due to Bernie Sanders co-opting his idea for democratic socialism. He is reluctantly pulled into the party, only to leave in favor of backing Harper's candidate, Dennis Chang, when the others ignore him. The political race comes to an end when Freddy is himself canceled due to his skin yellowing, as his campaigning was done entirely via a portable bathtub. The public assumes that he is adopting yellowface to mock Chang, and abandon his campaign. Ultimately neither candidate wins, and the mayorship is won by Pimco, a handicapped minor character who had (thus far in the series) been part of some of running jokes.
8	8	"Freakchella"	Joe Ekers	John Altschurer & Dave Krinsky	December 26, 2021
The Brothers attend a music festival, where Phineas and Freddy discover that Jim Morrison is still alive, posing as a hologram. He informs them that he time travels using a portal located at the Four Corners, inviting them to return to the 60s with him. Franklin is reluctant to go, as he has started a relationship with Gretchen, as well as a new job as the muse of performer Taylor Swift. He ends up driving them to the portal using Swift's tour bus, when they learn that ScHoolboy Q is intent on murdering them. It turns out that their old nemesis, Norberg the Narc, is also on the bus. The trio evade death when ScHoolboy Q and Norberg are sucked into the portal along with Jim Morrison, but are unable to enter it themselves before it disappears. They return home, where they are horrified to learn that these events had a butterfly effect on history, and weed is now illegal. Kitty then wakes from a nightmare, implying that the last part did not happen. The episode ends with the portal reopening in their backyard and ScHoolboy Q returning from the past.

=== Season 2 (2023) ===
In an interview with Animation World News Solomon and Mark Canton stated that there were plans for a second and third season of the show, and that the second season would introduce new characters. On May 2, 2022, Tubi announced that they had officially renewed the show for a second season, marking the first series renewal for the service. The second season is made up of eight episodes. Season 2 was originally slated to be released in December 2022, but the first four episodes of it were released on June 25, 2023. The remaining episodes were released on September 24, 2023.

No. overall	No. in season	Title	Directed by	Written by	Original release date
9	1	"Whack Shack"	Stephen Evans	Boyce Bugliari & Jamie McLaughlin	June 25, 2023
10	2	"True Freak-Tectivel"	Mark Salisbury	Danny Gendron	June 25, 2023
11	3	"High School Reunion"	Mark Salisbury	Alan R. Cohen & Alan Freedland	June 25, 2023
12	4	"The Freaks Go to Washington"	Mark Salisbury	Boyce Bugliari & Jamie McLaughlin	June 25, 2023
13	5	"Trans Trans Am"	Stephen Evans	Daniel Lehrer & Jeremy Lehrer-Graiwer	September 24, 2023
14	6	"Pet Condoms"	Stephen Evans	Jonathan Fener	September 24, 2023
15	7	"Meataverse"	Mark Salisbury	Daniel Lehrer & Jeremy Lehrer-Graiwer	September 24, 2023
16	8	"Freaking Bad"	Stephen Evans	Alan R. Cohen & Alan Freedland	September 24, 2023

=== Season 3 (2026) ===
In May 2024, High Times announced that Berner would be joining the show in an unspecified role and that season three was "in the works", but that no release date had been announced. The third season is made up of six episodes and was released on April 20, 2026.

No. overall	No. in season	Title	Directed by	Written by	Original release date
17	1	"Columbia (Pt. 1)"	Ben Bjelajac	Boyce Bugliari & Jamie McLaughlin; Story by : Alan R. Cohen & Alan Freedland; Boyce Bugliari & Jamie McLaughlin	April 20, 2026
18	2	"Columbia (Pt. 2)"	Ben Bjelajac	Boyce Bugliari & Jamie McLaughlin; Story by : Alan R. Cohen & Alan Freedland; Boyce Bugliari & Jamie McLaughlin	April 20, 2026
19	3	"Freak to the Future (Pt. 1)"	Ben Bjelajac	Daniel Lehrer & Jeremy Lehrer-Graiwer; Story by : Alan R. Cohen & Alan Freedland; Daniel Lehrer & Jeremy Lehrer-Graiwer	April 20, 2026
20	4	"Freak to the Future (Pt. 2)"	Ben Bjelajac	Daniel Lehrer & Jeremy Lehrer-Graiwer; Story by : Alan R. Cohen & Alan Freedland; Daniel Lehrer & Jeremy Lehrer-Graiwer	April 20, 2026
21	5	"ICE ICE Baby"	Ben Bjelajac	Boyce Bugliari & Jamie McLaughlin	April 20, 2026
22	6	"Dr. Dooblittle"	Ben Bjelajac	Daniel Lehrer & Jeremy Lehrer-Graiwer	April 20, 2026

== Reception ==
=== Viewership ===
Tubi has reported that the pilot episode was the most watched episode on their platform, based on total viewer time, and that the show as a whole was the second most popular series on Tubi during the first seven weeks of release.

=== Critical reception ===
Decider praised the decision to cast Davidson, Harrelson, and Goodman as the Freak Brothers, a sentiment shared by Den of Geek. CBR praised the voice acting and the chemistry between the cast, noting that the cast elevated the show "from being just a cartoonish, drug-oriented sitcom."

Common elements of criticism centered upon humor and animation. Den of Geek felt the animation was a little too slick and that lower quality animation would have worked better." Texas Monthly advised readers to skip the show and read the original comics instead, writing "There's something lazy about the show, a sense that all you need to do is roll out the boys, tell a few weed jokes, and get some easy laughs." The Comics Journal expressed a similar view that the show was inferior to the original works.

Per Solomon and Canton, they showed the episodes to Shelton, noting "What he said was, "I'm mostly happy." And that was a big compliment. Somebody who's worked with him for 50 years told us, "That's as big as it gets with Gilbert. That's it." So, Mark and I are sort of the same way. We're mostly happy, but we're never going to get too entirely happy. We just keep trying to make it better."
