= I'm Totally Fine =

2022 film

- Release poster
- Directed by: Brandon Dermer
- Screenplay by: Alisha Ketry
- Story by: Alisha Ketry; Brandon Dermer
- Starring: Jillian Bell; Natalie Morales; Blake Anderson; Harvey Guillén; Kyle Newacheck; Karen Maruyama
- Cinematography: Autumn Durald Arkapaw
- Edited by: Andrew Wilsak
- Music by: Danny Webber
- Distributed by: Decal
- Release date: November 4, 2022
- Running time: 83 minutes
- Country: United States
- Language: English

I'm Totally Fine is a 2022 science fiction comedy film, directed by Brandon Dermer and co-written with Alisha Ketry.

== Plot ==
After her best friend Jennifer's death, Vanessa goes on a vacation she was planning on taking with Jennifer to celebrate their natural soda company getting a distribution deal. On the first night, she gets drunk, takes Xanax, and passes out. The following morning, she finds Jennifer standing in her kitchen, claiming to be an alien who has been sent to Earth to study humans, and Vanessa is her test subject. She also tells Vanessa that since she has taken Jennifer's form, she has all of Jennifer's memories. Vanessa assumes that she is either dreaming or dying because of her drinking the night before, and goes along with the alien's research to discuss her friendship with Jennifer and receive closure on her death. However, when Vanessa reminisces about a Papa Roach concert she attended with Jennifer, saying that it was a special memory because it was the first time they saw the band, the alien reveals that Jennifer actually attended a Papa Roach concert with her sister the year before. Vanessa calls Jennifer's sister, who confirms this, and thus realizes that she is not hallucinating the alien.

Vanessa and the alien go to a gas station to see the soda from Jennifer and Vanessa's company on a store shelf, but Vanessa's car breaks down on the way. They end up getting help from a man Vanessa met earlier. Although Vanessa is cagey about trusting the man, the alien fully trusts him, and he drives them back to the house. The alien sees her first sunset.

Vanessa and the alien continue to discuss Vanessa's friendship with Jennifer. Vanessa says she always thought they were going to grow old together, and the alien tells her that wasn't going to happen: if Jennifer hadn't died, she and Vanessa would have gotten into a fight on this vacation and never speak to each other again. She tells Vanessa that she can see the future. A DJ arrives at the house for a party Vanessa and Jennifer were planning to throw that weekend. Vanessa and the alien agree to let the DJ play his set, and buy ecstasy off of him. They get high and bond.

The following morning, the alien tells Vanessa that she has completed all of her research, so they can spend the day together. The two of them end up getting into an argument when the alien reveals to Vanessa that she lied about being able to see the future, hoping that telling her that she and Jennifer were going to have a falling out would make Vanessa feel better. The alien calls on her mother ship to pick her up early. Right before the mother ship arrives, Vanessa and the alien reconcile. Vanessa goes back into the house to give the alien a parting gift, but the alien is gone before Vanessa goes back outside. Vanessa heads home, feeling that she has finally gotten closure for Jennifer's death and is ready to move forward.

== Cast ==
- Jillian Bell as Vanessa
- Natalie Morales as Jennifer / The Alien
- Blake Anderson as Eric
- Harvey Guillén as DJ Twisted Bristle
- Kyle Newacheck as The Towny
- Karen Maruyama as Sandra

== Production ==
I'm Totally Fine was announced in February 2021. The film was shot in Temecula, California in November 2021, during the COVID-19 pandemic. The story was conceived from the director's experiences of COVID-19, when he struggled with uncertainty and anxiety but was "present and happy again" once he accepted that he had no control.

== Release ==
I'm Totally Fine was released on November 4, 2022.

== Reception ==
On the review aggregator website Rotten Tomatoes, 71% of 24 critics' reviews are positive, with an average rating of 6.4/10. Metacritic, which uses a weighted average, assigned the film a score of 62 out of 100, based on 7 critics, indicating "generally favorable" reviews.

RogerEbert.com rated the film 3 out of 4 and commented: "The best sci-fi illuminates darker corners of the human condition and screenwriter Alisha Ketry has crafted a sci-fi context illustrating the destabilizing experience of grief in thought-provoking ways."

Noel Murray from The Los Angeles Times wrote a positive review: "The leads have a wonderful chemistry, with Bell hitting the right notes of anger and confusion and Morales maintaining the alien’s comic deadpan. Everyone involved has clearly thought through how such a wild fantasy situation might play out — and more importantly, how it would feel."

Nadir Samara of Screen Rant argues the film has adequate production and performances, but lacks the spark needed for "a fun, sci-fi dramedy" and lacks chemistry between the lead characters.
