= The Swedes =

- Brooklyn Nine-Nine episode
- Episode no.: Season 3 Episode 9
- Directed by: Eric Appel
- Written by: Matt Murray
- Cinematography by: Giovani Lampassi
- Editing by: Cortney Carillo
- Production code: 309
- Original air date: December 6, 2015
- Running time: 22 minutes

Guest appearances
- Anders Holm as Soren Knausgaard; Riki Lindhome as Agneta Carlsson; Marc Evan Jackson as Kevin Cozner; Neil deGrasse Tyson as himself

Episode chronology
← Previous "Ava"	Next → "Yippie Kayak"
- Brooklyn Nine-Nine season 3

"The Swedes" is the ninth episode of the third season of the American television police sitcom series Brooklyn Nine-Nine. It is the 54th overall episode of the series and is written by Matt Murray and directed by Eric Appel. It aired on Fox in the United States on December 6, 2015.

The show revolves around the fictitious 99th precinct of the New York Police Department in Brooklyn and the officers and detectives that work in the precinct. In the episode, Jake and Rosa compete with a pair of Swedish detectives in a jewelry theft case, causing them to re-examine their relationship as partners. Meanwhile, Holt asks Boyle to be his partner in a squash championship, while Terry and Amy try to help Gina pass her astronomy test.

The episode was seen by an estimated 3.88 million household viewers and gained a 1.7/5 ratings share among adults aged 18–49, according to Nielsen Media Research. The episode received positive reviews from critics, who praised the cast and the guest stars in the episode.

== Plot ==
In the cold opening, Jake accidentally destroys the new office vending machine in an opening ceremony by smashing a bottle of champagne against it.

Jake (Andy Samberg) and Rosa (Stephanie Beatriz) investigate a thief at the docks. They catch the thief, who holds an expensive 36-carat jewel and speaks in very broken Swedish. As the jewels are from Stockholm, two Swedish detectives are sent to retrieve the jewels.

The Swedish detectives, Inspector Søren Knausgaard (Anders Holm) and Deputy Inspector Agneta Carlsson (Riki Lindhome), show they are very close, unlike Jake's and Rosa's relationship as partners who avoid personal subjects. Jake and Rosa decide to go beyond and find a container linked to the thief, which ends up being the wrong one. After realizing the difference in Europeans' writing dates vs Americans, discover another container with the jewels inside and manage to catch the thieves. After the Swedes leave, Jake and Rosa decide to improve their relationship as partners, with Rosa revealing to Jake that she has a boyfriend.

Meanwhile, Holt (Andre Braugher) asks Boyle (Joe Lo Truglio) to be his partner in a squash championship when Kevin (Marc Evan Jackson) is out of town, but Boyle fears his extreme competitiveness, The Beast, will surface. After failing to give a decent match, Holt tells Boyle to "unleash the beast." Afterwards, they win the championship, but are banned for life from all future championships. Also, Amy (Melissa Fumero) and Terry (Terry Crews) help Gina (Chelsea Peretti) prepare for her upcoming astronomy test. Terry even brings Neil deGrasse Tyson, a friend from his gym, to help Gina. Eventually, they teach Gina through dancing, but Gina reveals that she already took the test and passed.

== Reception ==
=== Viewers ===
In its original American broadcast, "The Swedes" was seen by an estimated 3.95 million household viewers and gained a 1.7/5 ratings share among adults aged 18–49, according to Nielsen Media Research. This was a slight increase in viewership from the previous episode, which was watched by 3.88 million viewers with a 1.7/5 in the 18-49 demographics. This means that 1.7 percent of all households with televisions watched the episode, while 5 percent of all households watching television at that time watched it. With these ratings, Brooklyn Nine-Nine was the second most watched show on FOX for the night, beating The Last Man on Earth and Family Guy, but behind The Simpsons, third on its timeslot and third for the night, behind The Simpsons, and Sunday Night Football.

=== Critical reviews ===
"The Swedes" received positive reviews from critics. LaToya Ferguson of The A.V. Club gave the episode an "A−" grade and wrote, "'The Swedes' makes sure to bring constant jokes and waste no time, right from the moment the cold open rewards us all with a new vending machine in the Nine-Nine break room." Allie Pape from Vulture gave the show a 4 star rating out of 5 and wrote, "The funniest plot of the week had no guest star, though, as we learned that Boyle was the bad boy of collegiate squash, and Holt enlists him to compete in Kevin Cozner's place in an important tournament."

Alan Sepinwall of HitFix wrote, "After a couple of episodes in a row that seemed to be 'Brooklyn' leaning too hard into areas where the series tends to struggle, 'The Swedes' was the show back in excellent form – and, interestingly, while operating in places that have also been problems in the past." Andy Crump of Paste gave the episode a 9.0 rating and wrote, "'The Swedes' is one of the best-rounded episodes Brooklyn Nine-Nine has output yet in its third season. None of the plots feel wasted. Even as Amy and Terry try to help Gina muster up the gumption to crack an astronomy textbook, the show is pushing ahead on previously introduced story threads while staying true to character."
