= The Cloak of Duplication =

- What We Do in the Shadows episode
- Episode no.: Season 3 Episode 2
- Directed by: Yana Gorskaya
- Written by: Sam Johnson and Chris Marcil
- Cinematography by: DJ Stipsen
- Editing by: Yana Gorskaya; Dane McMaster
- Production code: XWS03002
- Original air date: September 2, 2021
- Running time: 23 minutes

Guest appearances
- Tyler Alvarez as Wes Blankenship; Lauren Collins as Meg; Kristen Schaal as The Guide; Nabil Rajo as Dave Lewis

Episode chronology
← Previous "The Prisoner"	Next → "Gail"

"The Cloak of Duplication" is the second episode of the third season of the American mockumentary comedy horror television series What We Do in the Shadows, set in the franchise of the same name. It is the 22nd overall episode of the series and was written by Sam Johnson and Chris Marcil, and directed by Yana Gorskaya. It was released on FX on September 2, 2021, airing back-to-back with the previous episode, "The Prisoner".

The series is set in Staten Island, New York City. Like the 2014 film, the series follows the lives of vampires in the city. These consist of three vampires, Nandor, Laszlo, and Nadja. They live alongside Colin Robinson, an energy vampire; and Guillermo, Nandor's familiar. The series explores the absurdity and misfortunes experienced by the vampires. In the episode, the vampires are introduced to a Cloak of Duplication, which Nandor intends to use for his advantage.

According to Nielsen Media Research, the episode was seen by an estimated 0.448 million household viewers and gained a 0.17 ratings share among adults aged 18–49. The episode received extremely positive reviews from critics, who praised the humor, character development and performances (particularly Kayvan Novak).

== Plot ==
The vampire start performing their duties at the Vampiric Council. Nandor (Kayvan Novak) and Nadja (Natasia Demetriou) have agreed to co-share the title of leadership, although they each plan to take over the position. The Guide (Kristen Schaal) introduces them to their chambers. One of the rooms contains the Sire, the oldest living vampire in existence from which they all descend, with specific instructions on never releasing the Sire.

The vampires are introduced to the Chamber of Curiosities, which keeps many valuable items. One of these is the Cloak of Duplication, granting the user to take on the exact likeness of another. Nandor decides to use it to win over Meg (Lauren Collins), a receptionist at a gym he frequently attends. For this, he asks Laszlo (Matt Berry) and Colin Robinson (Mark Proksch) to use the Cloak and try to compliment her, but they each insult her. After Laszlo erases her memory, Guillermo (Harvey Guillén) uses the cloak and manages to impress Meg as Nandor. Nandor later visits her at the gym, hoping to start a relationship. Meg not only states she is lesbian, but also believes that Nandor and Guillermo are attracted, confusing him. He erases her memory of him and attacks the security guard before leaving.

The vampires also visit Wes Blankenship (Tyler Alvarez), a vampire living in Queens who has been causing trouble. Confronting him, Wes reveals that he is forming his own entourage, the Council of Vampires, as an opposition to their leadership. When Wes refuses to comply with their demands, Nadja kills him, making his entourage accept their new terms. With new access to the vampire records, Colin Robinson intends to learn more about his past as he is about to turn 100. At their house, Nadja tells Nandor that he has been "very, very soft" ever since he came to America. She then uses the Cloak to scare him, making him see how soft he became.

== Production ==
=== Development ===
In August 2021, FX confirmed that the second episode of the season would be titled "The Cloak of Duplication", and that it would be written by Sam Johnson and Chris Marcil, and directed by Yana Gorskaya. This was Johnson's third writing credit, Marcil's second writing credit, and Gorskaya's third directing credit.

== Reception ==
=== Viewers ===
In its original American broadcast, "The Cloak of Duplication" was seen by an estimated 0.448 million household viewers with a 0.17 in the 18-49 demographics. This means that 0.17 percent of all households with televisions watched the episode. This was a 11% decrease in viewership from the previous episode, which was watched by 0.498 million household viewers with a 0.18 in the 18-49 demographics.

=== Critical reviews ===
"The Cloak of Duplication" received extremely positive reviews from critics. Katie Rife of The A.V. Club gave the episode an "A–" grade and wrote, "'The Cloak Of Duplication' is a looser, more character-based half hour of comedy, one that slips into cartoon territory when it dubs different cast members' voices over Kayvan Novak's body." Novak has since revealed that the voices were not dubbed and he did the impressions, except for Demetriou’s, himself.

Tony Sokol of Den of Geek gave the episode a 4 star rating out of 5 and wrote, "Accept no substitute, What We Do in the Shadows is a unique voice in televised horror comedy because it is an extremely traditional sitcom. Even with the innovations of the mock-documentary style and constant barrage on the third wall, it works through classic comedy and character commitment." Greg Wheeler of The Review Geek gave the episode a 4 star rating out of 5 and wrote, "The second episode of What We Do In The Shadows deepens the ties between our characters, especially with Nandor's desire to be more than a blood-lusting vampire. The whole subplot involving Meg is a lovely inclusion and the hilarious little twist at the end works well to subvert expectations."

Melody McCune of Telltale TV gave the episode a 4.5 star rating out of 5 and wrote, "'The Cloak of Duplication' is the stronger of the two episodes, introducing more slapstick comedy and classic sitcom hijinks, especially with Nandor's bid to win the affection of Meg, the receptionist at his gym. Nandor, Laszlo, and Colin Robinson's approaches to wooing women are as varied as antiquated, making for some hysterical moments." Alejandra Bodden of Bleeding Cool gave the episode a 9 out of 10 rating and wrote, "If this is how What We Do in the Shadows starts off the new season, I definitely cannot wait to see where the road will take us. Now that Guillermo's slayer background is out there, will we tackle at some point his crush on Nandor? The setup for this season is already fantastic & hilarious... and we're only two episodes in."
