= Adam Devine's House Party =

American comedy television series

- Genre: Comedy; Stand-up comedy
- Created by: Adam DeVine; Kyle Newacheck
- Written by: Adam DeVine; Scotty Landes
- Directed by: Kyle Newacheck; Adam Newacheck
- Starring: Adam DeVine
- Country of origin: United States
- Original language: English
- No. of seasons: 3
- No. of episodes: 28

Production
- Executive producers: Richard Allen-Turner; Adam DeVine; Isaac Horne; Anders Holm; Scotty Landes; Dan Lubetkin; David Martin; Kyle Newacheck; Jon Thoday
- Producers: Tommy Caprio; Adam Newacheck; Cathy A. Cambria
- Production locations: Los Angeles, New Orleans, Oahu
- Cinematography: Grant Smith
- Editors: Bijan Shams; Kenneth LaMere; Josh Belson; Lane Farnham
- Running time: 23 minutes
- Production companies: Dennis and Penny's Son, Inc.; Wonk Inc.; Avalon Television

Original release
- Network: Comedy Central
- Release: October 24, 2013 – May 5, 2016

Adam DeVine's House Party is an American comedy television series starring Adam DeVine that is part stand-up comedy show and part sitcom. The show aired for three seasons on Comedy Central. The first season ran for eight episodes, starting on October 24, 2013. The second season began on September 9, 2014, before moving to its regular Thursday timeslot on September 11. The third season aired for ten episodes, starting on March 3, 2016.

The premise of the show is that, in each episode, DeVine is hosting a party at which three stand-up comedians perform. At the beginning and end of the show, as well as between sets, there are scripted scenes involving DeVine and, usually, the three comedians, revolving around some plot related to the party. Only the first season truly involved a house party. The first season was set at, and filmed in, a house in Los Angeles; the second season was set at and filmed in a bar in New Orleans; and the third season was set at and filmed at the Turtle Bay Resort in Oahu, Hawaii.

In the first season, there was a recurring joke in which some or many of the partygoers leave early to attend a party at comedian Jeff Ross's house, to which DeVine was never invited.

== Production ==
The show was a longtime idea of DeVine's, based on house parties he had attended, as well as on the TV show The Larry Sanders Show, which was a hybrid of talk show and sitcom.

The show's scripted scenes were written by DeVine and Scotty Landes. Kyle Newacheck, DeVine's costar on Workaholics, is the co-creator of the show, as well as its director, and also occasionally appears onscreen as the director of the show-within-the-show.

Many of the comedians who perform are friends of DeVine's from his own stand-up comedy career.

== Episodes ==
Season	Episodes	Originally aired	
Season	Episodes	First aired	Last aired
1	8	October 24, 2013	December 19, 2013
2	10	September 9, 2014	November 6, 2014
3	10	March 3, 2016	May 5, 2016

=== Season 1 (2013) ===
The first season was filmed at a house in Chatsworth in Los Angeles, California that also served as Mike Tyson's house for the film The Hangover.

No. overall	No. in season	Title	Original release date
1	1	"Ex-Girlfriend"	October 24, 2013
Adam loses his mind when a friend brings Adam's ex-girlfriend to the house party. Featuring comedians Ahmed Bharoocha, Andrew Santino and Barry Rothbart.
2	2	"Neighbor Party"	October 31, 2013
Adam's neighbors aren't thrilled with the urine aftermath on their lawn. Featuring comedians Liza Treyger, Josh Rabinowitz and Sean Donnelly. Guest appearances by Matt McCarthy, Jay Leggett, Laurel Coppock, and the band Palma Violets.
3	3	"Foam Party"	November 7, 2013
How much foam do you need for a house party orgy? Featuring comedians Ron Funches, Drennon Davis and Brent Morin.
4	4	"Dregory"	November 14, 2013
Adam gets blackout drunk and booby-traps his mansion "Home Alone" style. Featuring comedians Matthew Broussard, Matt Koff and Asif Ali. Guest appearance by John Heard.
5	5	"Front Yard Comedy"	November 21, 2013
One lucky guest doles out jokes to passed out drunks at the front door of Adam's party. Featuring comedians Annie Lederman, Austin Anderson and Hampton Yount.
6	6	"Stunt Audition"	December 5, 2013
Adam literally blows up his own party in an attempt to win a role in a pal's new action movie. Featuring comedians Brooks Wheelan, Pete Davidson and Adam Ray.
7	7	"Lady Troopers"	December 12, 2013
A two-story beer bong and $1400 worth of Girl Scout cookies get Adam's party bumping. Featuring comedians Ron Babcock, the Lucas Brothers and Sam Simmons. Guest appearance by John Milhiser.
8	8	"Space Jam II"	December 19, 2013
Super Steve skydives from outer space right into Adam's house party. Featuring comedians Kevin Barnett, Esther Povitsky and Byron Bowers.

=== Season 2 (2014) ===
The second season was filmed at Bamboula's, a bar in New Orleans, Louisiana.

No. overall	No. in season	Title	Original release date
9	1	"King Cake, Baby!"	September 9, 2014
A combination of a marijuana-laced king cake, painkillers and absinthe make for an unwelcome introduction to New Orleans. Featuring comedians Ian Karmel, Aparna Nancherla and Brendan Lynch.
10	2	"Adam Killed a Man"	September 11, 2014
A prank on Kyle goes too far. Featuring comedians Randy Liedtke, Rob Christensen and Kristen Schaal.
11	3	"The Séance"	September 18, 2014
After a bad experience at a séance, Adam runs into trouble while hosting performances from Matteo Lane, Mark Serritella and Erik Griffin.
12	4	"Poboy"	September 25, 2014
After getting a sign from above, Adam adopts a kid and hosts performances from Rick Glassman, Monroe Martin and Kurt Braunohler.
13	5	"The Wolf of Bourbon Street"	October 2, 2014
Adam hosts Alingon Mitra, Cy Amundson and Ben Roy and desperately tries to take his house party back to the golden age of stand-up: the 1980s.
14	6	"Potagooo"	October 9, 2014
Adam welcomes Crystian Ramirez, Billy Bonnell and Kevin Christy to his house party.
15	7	"Marriage Material"	October 16, 2014
Featuring comedians Dave Thomason, John McKeever, and Nikki Glaser.
16	8	"A Good Day To Direct Hard"	October 23, 2014
Very serious artistry. Featuring comedians Make Bridenstine, Sam Morril, and Tone Bell.
17	9	"Flip Cup Twins"	October 30, 2014
Adam and his twin brother Jerome attempt to break a world record. Featuring comedians Sabrina Jalees, Nick Rutherford, and Jesus Trejo.
18	10	"Non-Stop Dance Party"	November 6, 2014
Adam refuses to stop partying. Featuring comedians Joe Pera, Thomas Dale, and Rell Battle.

=== Season 3 (2016) ===
Season 3 was shot entirely on location at Turtle Bay Resort in Oahu, Hawaii.

No. overall	No. in season	Title	Original release date
19	1	"Wedding in Paradise"	March 3, 2016
In Season 3 Adam goes to Hawaii. In the first episode Adam gets himself into a predicament when he lies to a hotel manager. Featuring comedians Chris Garcia, Jacob Williams & Megan Gailey.
20	2	"Sidekicks"	March 10, 2016
Adam looks for a new sidekick & welcomes stand-up from Ryan O'Flanagan, Matt Wayne & Taylor Tomlinson.
21	3	"Shy Guy"	March 17, 2016
An injury gives Adam a bad case of stage fright, but he still manages to introduce fellow comics Anthony DeVito, Noah Gardenswartz & Neel Nanda.
22	4	"Kook"	March 24, 2016
Adam immerses himself in the local Hawaiian culture and introduces stand-up from Langston Kerman, Jenny Zigrino & Devin Field.
23	5	"The Young Man & the Pig"	March 31, 2016
After eating magic mushrooms, Adam loses his pet pig. Comedians Kevin Iso, Josh Johnson & Brendan Eyre help him out.
24	6	"Banyan Tree Elf"	April 7, 2016
Adam has trouble staying focused after he encounters a sexy tree elf. Comedians Rob Haze, Sarah Tollemache & Leonard Ouzts.
25	7	"Documental"	April 14, 2016
Adam is the subject of a documentary made by a man from his past. Stand up from Chris Thayer, Myke Wright, and Dino Archie.
26	8	"A Very Dramatic Episode"	April 21, 2016
Things get dramatic when Alice Wetterlund, Pat Regan and Joe Sinclitico are on the show (but they still manage to do some stand up.)
27	9	"Point Broken"	April 28, 2016
Adam tries to surf a dangerous wave in order to impress a woman and welcomes stand-up from Matt Ingebertson, Jen D'Angelo and Amir K.
28	10	"Weekend at Adam's"	May 5, 2016
After Adam suffers an injury during a golf match, Jak Knight, Brandon Wardell and Vladimir Caamaño find a way to make sure he's still able to host the show.
