= Monkey Quest (film) =

Upcoming animated adventure film

- Directed by: David N. Weiss
- Screenplay by: J. David Stem; David N. Weiss
- Story by: Naoto Ohshima; Joseph Chou
- Produced by: Yoshi Ikezawa; Joseph Chou; Chuck Williams
- Starring: Adam DeVine; Auli'i Cravalho; J. K. Simmons; Sam Richardson; Skylar Astin; Anna Chlumsky; Jonathan Kite
- Edited by: Patrick J. Voetberg
- Music by: Caleb Chan; Brian Chan
- Production companies: Toei Animation; Sola Digital Arts
- Distributed by: Lionsgate Films
- Release date: 2027
- Running time: 99 minutes
- Countries: Japan; United States
- Language: English

Monkey Quest is an upcoming animated science fiction action-adventure film directed by David N. Weiss (in his directorial debut), co-directed by Stephanie Ma Stine, and Takao Noguchi, from a screenplay written by J. David Stem and Weiss. The film stars Adam DeVine, Auliʻi Cravalho, J. K. Simmons, and Sam Richardson. It was produced by Toei Animation and Sola Digital Arts.

The film is scheduled to be released in 2027.

== Premise ==
In the not-so-distant future, a teenage girl (Cravalho) and her younger brother liberate the protector of Earth Okon (DeVine) in the hope that he can reunite them with their missing parents.

== Voice cast ==
- Adam DeVine as Okon
- Auliʻi Cravalho as Elle
- J. K. Simmons as Vex
- Sam Richardson
- Skylar Astin
- Anna Chlumsky
- Jonathan Kite

== Production ==
During TIFFCOM at the 2018 Tokyo International Film Festival on October 24, Toei Animation and Bona Film Group alongside Sammy and Marza Animation Planet initially announced the project, tentatively titled The Monkey Prince, a computer-animated film with John A. Davis initially set to direct the film from a screenplay by J. David Stem and David N. Weiss, based on an original story by Naoto Oshima with Oshima and Takao Noguchi handling character designs with Chuck Williams serving as a producer. The film will be initially produced in English before being adapted into Mandarin for the Chinese market and has received co-production approval from Chinese authorities. In order to produce the film, Tenh Animation Magic was established two weeks prior with investments from Toei, Sola Digital Arts and Galaxy Graphics. Sanzigen was responsible for the film's production hub with the film being scheduled to be released in 2020, in time for that year's Summer Olympics prior to its postponement to 2021 due to the COVID-19 pandemic.

After being sat on development hell for six years, Toei Animation announced in February 2024, that the film, now titled Hypergalactic was in post-production with Weiss now being hired to direct the film (replacing A. Davis), alongside co-writing the screenplay with Oshima and Sola Entertainment founder Joseph Chou from their original story with the latter two replacing Stem and Bona, Sammy and Marza dropping out from the project. The studio is calling the film as their biggest CGI project to date. Adam DeVine, Elsie Fisher, J. K. Simmons, and Sam Richardson joined the film's voice cast, with Devine voicing the protagonist, the protector of Earth Okhan. Toei's Yoshi Ikezawa serves as the film's producer while Kozo Morishita, Katsuhiro Takagi, and Tim Kwok serve as executive producers with Charades handling international sales.

Post-production had begun by February 2024, still ongoing in August of that year, after nearly two years of production at Tenh Animation Magic in Tokyo.

In April 2026, the film was retitled to Monkey Quest with a work-in-progress cut screened at the Annecy International Animation Film Festival on June 22 with the film now being shifted to a hybrid 2D/3D art style with the CGI being done at Sanzigen. In September 2026, it was announced that Lionsgate has picked up the film for distribution in the United States as part of a wider partnership with Toei Animation. In addition, it was announced that Auliʻi Cravalho, Skylar Astin, Anna Chlumsky, and Jonathan Kite would be joining the cast; with Cravalho replacing Fisher in the role of Elle.

== Release ==
Monkey Quest is set to be released by Lionsgate in the United States in 2027.
