= Adam DeVine =

American comedian, actor, producer and writer (born 1983)

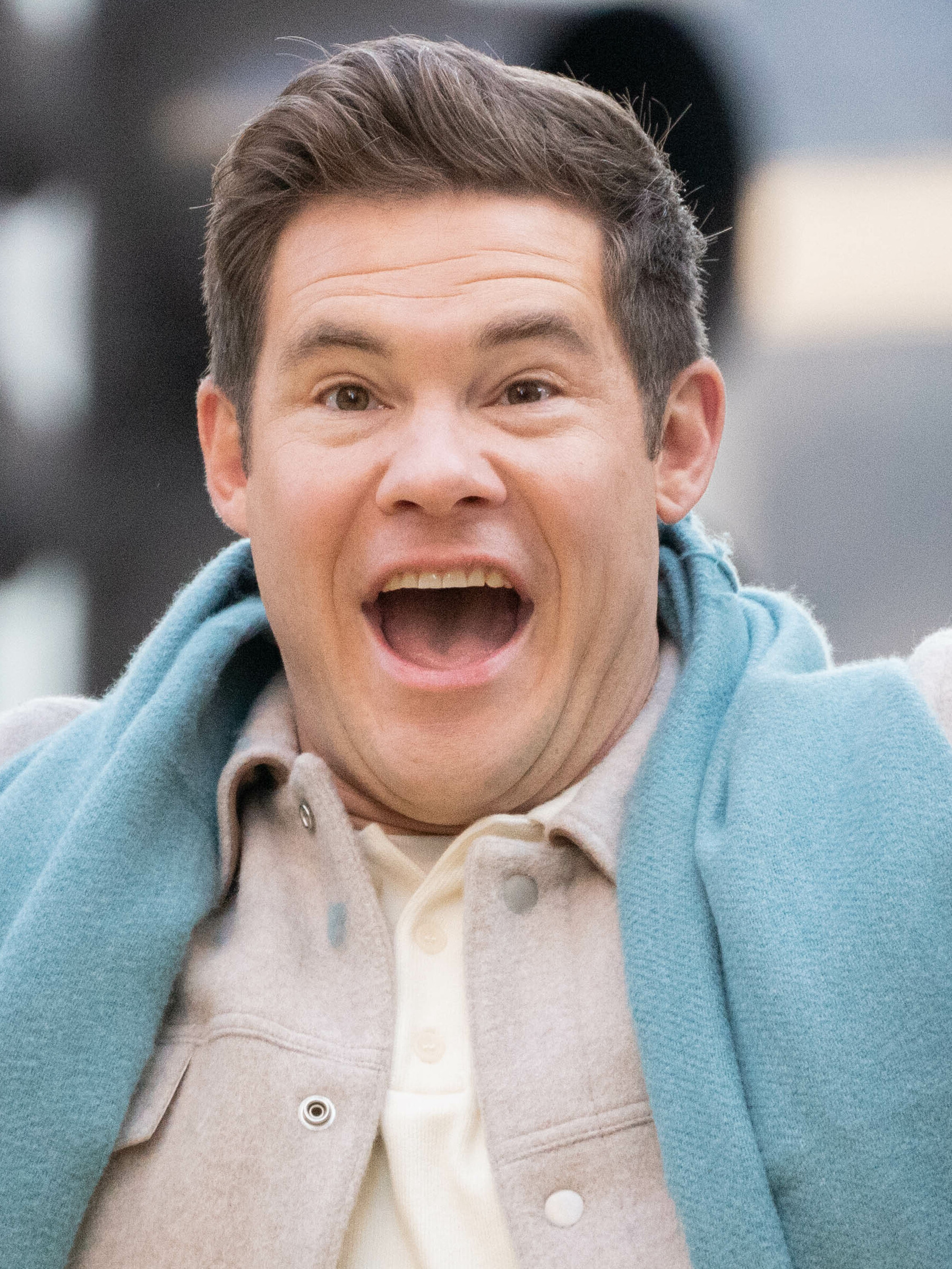
- DeVine in 2022
- Born: November 7, 1983 (age 43); Waterloo, Iowa, U.S.
- Occupations: Comedian; actor; producer; screenwriter
- Years active: 2006–present
- Spouse: Chloe Bridges (m. 2021)
- Children: 1

Adam DeVine (born November 7, 1983) is an American comedian, actor, producer and screenwriter. He is one of the stars and co-creators of the Comedy Central comedy television series Workaholics and Adam DeVine's House Party.

He played the role of Bumper in the musical films Pitch Perfect and Pitch Perfect 2 and the television series Pitch Perfect: Bumper in Berlin. He had recurring sitcom roles as Andy Bailey in Modern Family and Adam DeMamp in Workaholics. From 2019-2025, he starred as Kelvin Gemstone in the acclaimed HBO comedy series The Righteous Gemstones.

He had roles in the films The Intern, The Final Girls, Mike and Dave Need Wedding Dates, Game Over, Man!, Jexi, When We First Met, and The Out-Laws. He has voiced characters in films including Ice Age: Collision Course, The Lego Batman Movie, Extinct, Fixed and Hypergalactic, as well as in the animated series Uncle Grandpa, Penn Zero: Part-Time Hero, Vampirina, Green Eggs and Ham, The Freak Brothers, and Captain Fall.

== Early life ==
DeVine was born in Waterloo, Iowa, the son of Dennis and Penny DeVine. He was raised in Omaha, Nebraska, and graduated from Millard South High School in 2002. He attended Orange Coast College; his friend and future co-star Blake Anderson was a classmate there.

In 1995, when DeVine was 11, he walked his bicycle across a road in Omaha. After he waited for three cement trucks to pass, a fourth truck, which he had not seen due to traffic traveling in the opposite direction, struck him while he was in the street. The first two wheels of the 42-ton truck rolled over him and he slid 500 ft (150 m). He was knocked unconscious, suffered acute shock, and fell into a coma. He was rushed to intensive care, where he woke up two weeks later. All the bones in both of his legs were broken, and his legs were crushed below the knee. The skin had been ripped from his legs, he had a collapsed lung, several broken ribs, and developed multiple infections. At that time, it was unknown whether he would walk again, and over the next several years, he had 26 surgeries and spent much of his time in a wheelchair.

Due to the extent of his injuries, DeVine was at a high risk of having to have his legs amputated, and having multiple organ failure. It was discovered that the reason he was not killed was that his bicycle took the full force of the truck. DeVine regained full mobility but still has extensive scarring on his legs. He said, "It was really tough because I had to relearn how to walk, stand up, sit up and everything. The legs were totally mangled. I think that experience helped me realize that anything is possible." Passing the time he would call in to his local radio station and impersonate celebrities to entertain himself and others. After returning to school, he experienced bullying, but told jokes as a way to deflect attention away from his injuries. He later said that his experiences had contributed to how he saw comedy as a way of bringing people together. DeVine has noted he still feels the effects of the accident to this day, to the point where he was misdiagnosed with stiff person syndrome and went through stem cell therapy.

== Career ==
In 2006, DeVine and friends Blake Anderson, Anders Holm, and Kyle Newacheck formed the sketch-comedy group Mail Order Comedy. They toured together live and found greater success on websites such as MySpace and YouTube. In April 2008, the G4 series Attack of the Show! featured "Wizards Never Die", a music video by Mail Order Comedy (as The Wizards). Purple Magic, a music album by The Wizards containing 14 tracks, was released on April 1, 2009. Comedy Central's original series Workaholics premiered on April 6, 2011, and stars DeVine, Anderson, and Holm and co-stars Newacheck, all of whom serve as series creators and executive producers.

DeVine had small roles in Mama's Boy (2007) and National Lampoon's 301: The Legend of Awesomest Maximus (2009). He had a recurring role on the television series Samantha Who?. He appeared on an episode of the Fox show Traffic Light (2011). In season 4 of Community (2013), he played a small role as William Winger, Jr., Jeff's half-brother. In the first episode of Arrested Development's fourth season, he played an airport ticket attendant alongside his Workaholics co-stars. He co-starred as Bumper Allen in the 2012 musical comedy film Pitch Perfect. For the performance, he won a Teen Choice Award for Choice Movie Villain and earned one nomination for Choice Movie Breakout. He reprised the role of Bumper in the film's sequel Pitch Perfect 2 (2015).

DeVine has appeared in the SimCity video game trailers as The Mayor. DeVine is the voice artist for the character Pizza Steve in the Cartoon Network animated series Uncle Grandpa, which premiered on September 2, 2013. He starred in his own Comedy Central series, Adam Devine's House Party, which debuted in October 2013 and ended in May 2016 after 3 seasons. He appeared in a recurring role of the Pritchett family's new nanny, Andy, in seasons 5, 6, and 7 of the ABC network sitcom Modern Family. In 2015, he performed in a supporting role, playing Kurt, in the slasher film The Final Girls. In 2016, he starred alongside Zac Efron, playing brothers, in the comedy film Mike and Dave Need Wedding Dates. DeVine made a cameo appearance in the video for the 2016 Blink-182 song "She's Out of Her Mind".

In 2016, DeVine was cast as the lead of Walt Disney Pictures family-film Magic Camp, alongside Jeffrey Tambor and Gillian Jacobs. DeVine plays Andy Duckerman, a failed magician who goes back to the camp of his youth to mentor a rag-tag bunch of magicians. Principal photography began in January 2017 around Los Angeles. The film was released on August 14, 2020.

In 2018, DeVine played the lead, Noah Ashby, in the romantic comedy When We First Met, which he co-wrote. That same year, DeVine, Anderson, and Holm starred in the film Game Over, Man!, with Newacheck directing and Newacheck and Seth Rogen among its producers. On August 18, 2019, Devine debuted as Kelvin Gemstone in the HBO comedy television series The Righteous Gemstones. Created by Danny McBride, the series follows a dysfunctional world-famous family of televangelists. In September 2019, HBO renewed the series for a second season.

In 2019, DeVine starred alongside Rebel Wilson and Liam Hemsworth in the romantic comedy/parody Isn't It Romantic. The film marked the fourth time that DeVine and Wilson have played love interests, after Workaholics, Pitch Perfect and Pitch Perfect 2.

It was announced on July 13, 2019, at San Diego Comic-Con that DeVine and Anderson would executive produce and provide voices for the animated adaptation of Gilbert Shelton's underground comic book The Fabulous Furry Freak Brothers.

== Personal life ==
DeVine is a supporter of Children's Miracle Network Hospitals, a not-for-profit organization that raises funds for children's hospitals across the U.S. As he was treated by a children's hospital as a child, he attends charity events and visits the children, telling his story of survival to provide comfort to the patients and their parents.

DeVine regularly takes part in United Service Organizations tours, providing entertainment for military personnel across the world and describes it as "the most rewarding experience of his life".

In February 2023, DeVine was celebrity monarch of the Krewe of Bacchus, a Carnival superkrewe in New Orleans' Mardi Gras.

After meeting on a flight on their way to the set of The Final Girls in 2014, DeVine began dating Chloe Bridges in February 2015. They became engaged in October 2019, and married in October 2021. Their son Beau DeVine was born on February 16, 2024.

== Filmography ==
=== Film ===
Year	Title	Role	Notes
2007	Mama's Boy	Alhorn	
2009	Ratko: The Dictator's Son	Chris	
2011	The Legend of Awesomest Maximus	Ephor 1	
2012	Pitch Perfect	Bumper Allen	
2014	Neighbors	Beer Pong Guy #1	Cameo
2015	The Final Girls	Kurt	
2015	Pitch Perfect 2	Bumper Allen	
2015	The Intern	Jason	
2016	Ice Age: Collision Course	Julian	Voice
2016	Mike and Dave Need Wedding Dates	Mike Stangle	
2016	Why Him?	Tyson Modell	
2017	The Lego Batman Movie	The Flash / Barry Allen	Voice
2018	When We First Met	Noah Ashby	Also executive producer
2018	Game Over, Man!	Alexxx	Also story writer and producer
2018	The Package	—N/a	Producer
2019	Isn't It Romantic	Josh	
2019	Jexi	Phil Thompson	
2020	Have a Good Trip: Adventures in Psychedelics	Young Anthony Bourdain	
2020	Magic Camp	Andy Duckerman	
2021	Extinct	Ed	Voice
2023	The Out-Laws	Owen Browning	Also producer
2025	Fixed	Bull	Voice
2027	Ice Age: Boiling Point	Julian	Voice
TBA	Monkey Quest	Okon	Voice

=== Television ===
Year	Title	Role	Notes
2006–2008	Crossbows & Mustaches	Steve Wolf / Steve Jobs	Also co-creator, writer, executive producer; 10 episodes
2007	Nick Cannon Presents: Short Circuitz	Teen	Episode: "1.1"
2007	The Minor Accomplishments of Jackie Woodman	Toby	Episode: "Dykes Like Us"
2008	Special Delivery	Himself	Episode: "Strike a Pose"
2008	420 Special: Attack of the Show! from Jamaica	Bull Doozer	Television film
2008	The Dude's House	Himself	Also co-creator, writer, executive producer; 3 episodes
2008	Frank TV	Waiter / Jack Gerber	2 episodes
2008	5th Year	Himself	5 episodes
2009	Better Off Ted	Josh	Uncredited; Episode: "Win Some, Dose Some"
2009	Samantha Who?	Tyler Banks	Episodes: "The Dream Job", "The Other Woman"
2011	Traffic Light	Tobey	Episode: "Stealth Bomber"
2011–2017	Workaholics	Adam DeMamp	Main role; also co-creator, writer, executive producer
2012	Tron: Uprising	Galt	Voice, episode: "Identity"
2012–2013	Motorcity	Thurman the Magnificent	Voice, 2 episodes
2013	Community	Willy Winger Jr.	Episode: "Cooperative Escapism in Familial Relations"
2013	Arrested Development	Starsky	Episode: "Flight of the Phoenix"/"Moving Pictures" (Fateful Consequences release)
2013	Comedy Bang! Bang!	Nick	Episode: "Sarah Silverman Wears a Black Dress with a White Collar"
2013	Super Fun Night	Jason	Episode: "Pilot"
2013–2016	Adam Devine's House Party	Himself	Also creator, writer, executive producer
2013–2017	Uncle Grandpa	Pizza Steve	Voice, main role
2013–2018	Modern Family	Andy Bailey	Recurring role (seasons 5–7, 9); 22 episodes
2014	Sanjay and Craig	Raska Boosh	Voice, episode: "Kerplunk'd!"
2014	American Dad!	Christoff	Voice, episode: "Honey, I'm Homeland"
2014–2017	Penn Zero: Part-Time Hero	Boone Wiseman	Voice, main role
2015	Hell's Kitchen	Himself	Episode: "17 Chefs Compete"
2015	Steven Universe	Pizza Steve	Voice, episode: "Say Uncle"
2015	Sin City Saints	Matty	Episode: "You Booze, You Lose"
2015	Drunk History	Pavel Belyayev	Episode: "Space"
2016	Teenage Mutant Ninja Turtles: Don vs. Raph	Raphael	Voice, short
2018	Vampirina	Poltergeist Pat	Voice, episode: "Home Scream Home"
2019–2025	The Righteous Gemstones	Kelvin Gemstone	Main role
2019–2022	Green Eggs and Ham	Sam-I-Am	Voice, main role
2021	The Price Is Right at Night	Himself	Guest
2021–present	The Freak Brothers	Chuck	
2022	Pitch Perfect: Bumper in Berlin	Bumper Allen	Main role; also executive producer
2022	Reindeer in Here	Blizzard	Voice, television special
2023	Captain Fall	Tanner	Voice
2025	Reading Rainbow (revival)	Reader	Episode: "Moo Hoo"
2025	Krapopolis	Bloodmouth	Voice, 2 episodes
2025	It's Florida, Man	Chad	Episode: "Pizza Man"
2026	Last Week Tonight with John Oliver	Secret Service Agent	Episode: "Secret Service"

=== Music videos ===
Year	Title	Artist(s)	Ref.
2016	"She's Out of Her Mind"	Blink-182	
2019	"California Snow"	Weezer	

== Awards and nominations ==
Awards	Year	Category	Nominated work	Result
MTV Movie & TV Award	2016	Choice Movie Villain	Pitch Perfect 2 (shared with Rebel Wilson)	Won
MTV Movie & TV Award	2017	Best Comedic Performance	Workaholics	Nominated
People's Choice Award	2017	Favorite Cable TV Actor	Workaholics	Nominated
Teen Choice Award	2013	Choice Movie Villain	Pitch Perfect	Won
Teen Choice Award	2013	Choice Movie Breakout	Pitch Perfect	Nominated
Teen Choice Award	2014	Choice TV: Male Scene Stealer	Modern Family	Nominated
Teen Choice Award	2015	Choice Movie: Liplock	Pitch Perfect 2 (shared with Rebel Wilson)	Nominated
Teen Choice Award	2015	Choice Movie: Scene Stealer	Pitch Perfect 2	Nominated
Young Hollywood Awards	2014	Fan Favorite Actor–Male	Himself	Nominated
Young Hollywood Awards	2014	Best Threesome	Workaholics (shared with Anders Holm, Blake Anderson)	Nominated
