= Game Over, Man! =

- Promotional poster
- Directed by: Kyle Newacheck
- Screenplay by: Anders Holm
- Story by: Anders Holm; Kyle Newacheck; Adam DeVine; Blake Anderson
- Produced by: Adam DeVine; Anders Holm; Blake Anderson; Kyle Newacheck; Seth Rogen; Evan Goldberg; James Weaver; Scott Rudin; Eli Bush; Isaac Horne
- Starring: Adam DeVine; Anders Holm; Blake Anderson; Utkarsh Ambudkar; Aya Cash; Neal McDonough; Daniel Stern; Jamie Demetriou; Rhona Mitra; Sam Richardson; Steve Howey
- Cinematography: Grant Smith
- Edited by: Evan Henke
- Music by: Steve Jablonsky
- Production companies: Mail Order Company; Point Grey Pictures; Scott Rudin Productions
- Distributed by: Netflix
- Release date: March 23, 2018
- Running time: 101 minutes
- Country: United States
- Language: English
- Budget: $27.1 million

Game Over, Man! is a 2018 American action comedy film directed by Kyle Newacheck, written by Anders Holm, and starring Holm, Adam DeVine, and Blake Anderson, all of whom previously collaborated on the sitcom Workaholics. Serving as a comedic parody of Die Hard (1988), the film follows three housekeepers who are entangled in a terrorist takeover of a Los Angeles hotel. The film was released on March 23, 2018, on Netflix to generally negative reception from critics.

== Plot ==
Alexx, Darren, Joel are three out-of-luck friends employed at a luxury hotel in Los Angeles under their supervisor Cassie and the manager, Mitch. After dismissing Cassie's complaints about the trio's inappropriate antics, Mitch informs the friends that a party is headed to their hotel, with Mr. Ahmad serving as the personal attaché of the Bey of Tunisia, Bae Awadi. Alexxx sees this as a huge opportunity to pitch their business idea to the Bey and get funding. The trio will attempt to pitch "Skintendo", a video game that they have been developing. Darren and Joel later revealed they've been working on the project with Alexx's involvement.

Unbeknownst to the staff, a group of terrorists enter the building through the parking lot, impersonating as the Bey's security team. The three friends use the party in the evening to get close to Bae and pitch him the idea of the Skintendo. Bae proposes that he donate $200,000 which over-rules Ahmad's protests against the investment. As the boys leave with the check, Mitch later confiscates it, then fires them due to their stunt. The terrorist field leader Conrad enters with Erma and takes control of the party. Erma then mutilates Mitch's genitals when he harasses her. Alexxx comes back to confront Ahmad and Mitch whereupon he finds Erma standing over him. He then flees before the terrorists can catch him. Donald, who serves as the group's hacker, enters the security room and seizes control of the building. The hotel staff are taken to the roof which is rigged with explosives. The trio find all exits guarded, and their phones were confiscated earlier from Mitch. As two members, Rich and Jared, conduct a room-to-room search, they are attacked by Alexx, Darren, and Joel. Rich is killed by Joel and an enraged Jared slips and splits his head open on the side table.

Conrad orders Bae to transfer $500 million into an offshore account and presses him for the access codes, otherwise he will kill his friends in the party one by one. Meanwhile, the trio come up with a method to make a zip line across to a window cleaning bench at the next building. After an escape snafu from Rich, who survived after all, the trio tries get the attention to the police after their arrival. Following an argument about the Skintendo, the trio get into a fight, and they then crash into the hotel security room, just as Donald was entering the access codes into the computer to finish the transfer. The computer is smashed and in the process, another terrorist is killed. Including Donald later on from the zip-line Joel and Darren had made, leading him to his death from a fatal fall. Joel then sees that Donald's phone had Ahmad's number as the last dialled. Having tried to called his phone, Alexx realizes that Ahmad was working with Conrad all along. Leaving Ahmad then to shoot Conrad in front of the hostages, assuming full command of the operation. Having revealing himself as the ringmaster of the operation.

Ahmad then releases a video to the authorities demanding the ransom for all the hostages and a helicopter to escape from the building. Any attempt to attack the building will trigger an collar explosive which is around each hostage's neck. He further threatens to shoot a hostage every fifteen minutes. The trio plan to use all the Salvia drugs in Alexxx's room to stone the hostages and their gunners in the conference room. After tracking them down in the air ducts, Erma inhales a huge amount of Salvia as the trio escaped. They team up to fight off one of her men and kill him in the hotel kitchen. Ahmad meanwhile kills Bey's dog and makes hostages fight each other to the death every fifteen minutes. The trio are tracked down by Rich, who holds them at gunpoint. He ties them down at the hotel spa and starts torturing them, but they slip out from their restrains and finally kill him.

Darren and Joel team up to make a Skintendo out of Rich's corpse. Having getting the suit programmed while having an iPad to control, they use it as a weapon to take out the remaining terrorists, but the suit overheats and later explodes. After testing out the Skintendo, the trio corner Ahmad at gunpoint. Suddenly, Erma recovers and enters the conference room as Ahmad escapes with the money. Joel then proceeds to battle Erma after being inspired from him coming out to Alexx and Darren. Although Erma has the upper hand in the entire fight, a cauterized Mitch distracts her by throwing his severed penis: this allows Joel to fatally impale her on a piece of sharp wood. The trio then head to the roof and convince Ahmad to exchange Bey for the bags of money he left behind. Ahmad agrees and takes off with the money. However, he realises too late that the collar explosives were in the money bags instead and when the hostages leave the hotel, the helicopter explodes killing him.

With Bey and the hostages rescued, Alexx, Joel and Darren are hailed as heroes. One of the hostages, Mark Cuban, offers to buy the trio's story and turn it into a video game starring Mark-Paul Gosselaar, Sean Astin and Cara Delevingne. Two years since that night, the proposed video game based on their story, "Game Over, Man!" has become an commercial success as the three friends celebrated their achievement on a yacht. Unknown to them, they are then later being pursued by Somali pirates.

== Cast ==
- Adam DeVine as Alexxx
- Anders Holm as Darren
- Blake Anderson as Joel
- Utkarsh Ambudkar as Bae Awadi
- Aya Cash as Cassie
- Neal McDonough as Conrad
- Daniel Stern as Mitch
- Jamie Demetriou as Mr. Ahmad
- Rhona Mitra as Erma
- Sam Richardson as Donald
- Steve Howey as Rich
- Mac Brandt as Jared
- Geno Segers as Sal

Several celebrities also have cameo appearances as themselves, including Shaggy, Sugar Lyn Beard, Fred Armisen, Joel McHale, Flying Lotus, Steve-O, Donald Faison, Action Bronson, Chris Pontius, and Mark Cuban.

== Production ==
On June 9, 2016, Netflix announced that it was producing Game Over, Man! with producers including Seth Rogen, Evan Goldberg, and James Weaver via their Point Grey banner; and Scott Rudin and Eli Bush via Scott Rudin Productions. The list of producers also includes Adam DeVine, Anders Holm, Blake Anderson, and Kyle Newacheck, who collectively form the comedy group Mail Order Comedy, as well as Isaac Horne of Avalon Management.

== Release ==
The film held its official premiere on March 21, 2018, at the Regency Village Theater in Los Angeles, California.

== Reception ==
=== Critical reception ===
On the review aggregation website Rotten Tomatoes, the film holds an 18% approval rating based on 17 reviews, with an average rating of 3.6/10. Metacritic, which uses a weighted average, assigned the film a score of 32 out of 100 based on 8 critics, indicating "generally unfavorable" reviews.

In a negative review, Glenn Kenny of The New York Times wrote: "This almost laugh-free comedy...is distinguished by a relentless level of outrageous yet strangely listless vulgarity." In a similarly negative review, Monica Castillo of Variety wrote: "Game Over, Man! is a movie with few original ideas, plenty of tropes, and not enough love for the Bill Paxton Aliens character who made its eponymous catchphrase popular." David Ehrlich of Indiewire was more mixed, saying: "Game Over, Man! becomes to Workaholics what Keanu was to Key & Peele — a sporadically funny riff on a formula that worked much better in small doses. You know it's a Netflix joint, because it almost feels designed to be half-watched in the background; an overly loud piece of muzak." In a somewhat positive review, Michael Rechtshaffen of the Los Angeles Times wrote: "The guys occasionally over-reach for irreverence, director and fellow Workaholics veteran Kyle Newacheck mainly succeeds in delivering the most defiantly outrageous farce since Borat."
