= Anders Holm =

American comedian and actor

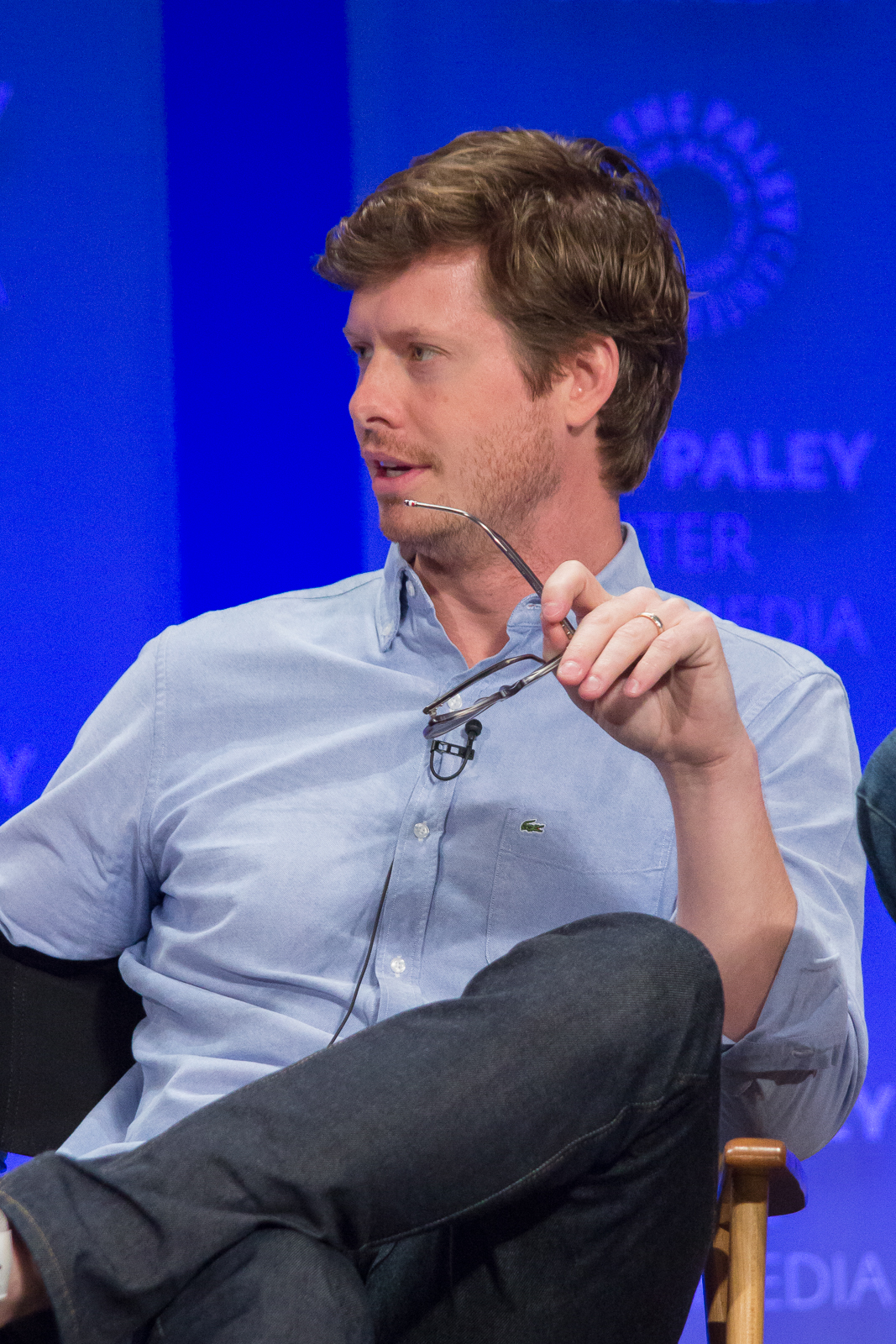
- Holm in March 2015
- Born: May 29, 1981 (age 45); Evanston, Illinois, U.S.
- Occupations: Comedian; actor; writer; producer
- Years active: 2006–present
- Spouse: Emma Nesper (m. 2011)
- Children: 3

Anders Holm (born May 29, 1981) is an American comedian and actor. He is one of the stars and creators of the Comedy Central show Workaholics and starred in the short-lived NBC series Champions. He, along with fellow Workaholics creators Blake Anderson, Adam DeVine, and Kyle Newacheck, formed the sketch group Mail Order Comedy.

== Early life and education ==
Holm was born the youngest of three boys on May 29, 1981, in Evanston, Illinois. His two brothers are Olen (born 1975) and Erik (born 1976). He graduated from Evanston Township High School. In 2003, he graduated from the University of Wisconsin–Madison with a bachelor's degree in history. He was a member of the university's swim team. Holm studied at the Second City Conservatory in Los Angeles.

== Career ==
Holm, along with fellow Workaholics creators Blake Anderson, Adam DeVine and Kyle Newacheck, formed the sketch comedy group Mail Order Comedy. He played a hip pastor who became the title character's fiancé in The Mindy Project. He made a guest appearance in the fourth season of Modern Family in the episode "Flip Flop". He also made a guest appearance in the third season of Brooklyn Nine-Nine in the episode "The Swedes".

Holm made a guest appearance with fellow Workaholics actors Anderson, DeVine and Erik Griffin on the first episode of the fourth season of Arrested Development. He has served as production and head writer's assistant for Real Time with Bill Maher before his work on Workaholics.

In 2014, Holm appeared in the Chris Rock-directed comedy film Top Five. Holm has appeared in films involving Seth Rogen, such as Neighbors, The Interview (both 2014), and Sausage Party (2016).

In 2016, he starred in the comedy film How to Be Single.

In 2018, he wrote, produced and acted in Game Over, Man! with Rogen as co-producer. The film was released on Netflix. Also that year, Holm co-produced The Package, a Netflix original film comedy that premiered on August 10.

== Personal life ==
Holm married his high school sweetheart, Emma Nesper, in September 2011. Their first child was born in 2013.

== Filmography ==
=== Film ===
Key
†	Denotes films that have not yet been released

Year	Title	Role	Notes
2014	Neighbors	Beer Pong Guy #3	Cameo
2014	Top Five	Brad	
2014	Inherent Vice	LAPD Officer #2	
2014	The Interview	Jake	
2015	Unexpected	John	
2015	The Intern	Matt Ostin	
2016	How to Be Single	Tom	
2016	Sausage Party	Troy	Voice
2017	Kuso	Teacher	
2017	A Happening of Monumental Proportions	Christian McRow	
2018	Game Over, Man!	Darren	Also screenwriter and producer
2018	Show Dogs	Pigeon 1	Voice
2023	About My Father	Lucky Collins	

=== Television ===
Year	Title	Role	Notes
2006–2008	Crossbows & Mustaches	Bruce Romaine	10 episodes Also co-creator, writer and executive producer
2008	420 Special: Attack of the Show! from Jamaica	Limahl Spellswell	Television film
2008	The Dude's House	Anders	3 episodes
2008	5th Year	Anders	5 episodes
2011	Traffic Light	Howard	Episode: "Stealth Bomber"
2011–2017	Workaholics	Anders Holmvik	Main cast; 86 episodes Also co-creator, writer and executive producer
2012	Key & Peele	White Guy in Negraph Commercial	Episode: "The Branding"
2013	Modern Family	Zack Barbie	Episode: "Flip Flop"
2013–2017	The Mindy Project	Casey Peerson	12 episodes
2013	Arrested Development	Supervisor Spoon	Episode: "Flight of the Phoenix"/"Moving Pictures" (Fateful Consequences release)
2013	High School USA!	Garret Philanders	Voice, episode: "Heroes"
2014	American Dad!	Eric	Voice, episode: "Scents and Sensei-bility"
2015	Hell's Kitchen	Himself	Episode: "17 Chefs Compete"
2015	Brooklyn Nine-Nine	Soren Knausgaard	Episode: "The Swedes"
2016	Teenage Mutant Ninja Turtles: Don vs. Raph	Leonardo	Voice, short
2018	Champions	Vince Cook	Main cast; 10 episodes
2018	Happy Together	Antoine	Episode: "Let's Work It Out"
2019	Unbreakable Kimmy Schmidt	Bryan Pigslinger	Episode: "Sliding Van Doors"
2019	Mixed-ish	Paul Jackson	Unaired pilot
2020	Robot Chicken	Fat Cat, John 'Jonesy' Jones	Voice, episode: "Ghandi Mulholland in: Plastic Doesn't Get Cancer"
2022	Inventing Anna	Jack	Main cast; 9 episodes
2023	The Muppets Mayhem	JJ	Main cast; 10 episodes
2023–present	Monarch: Legacy of Monsters	Bill Randa	

=== Web series ===
Year	Title	Role	Notes
2011	Hardly Working		1 episode: "Five Year Hangover"
