= Blake Anderson =

American actor, comedian and producer (born 1984)

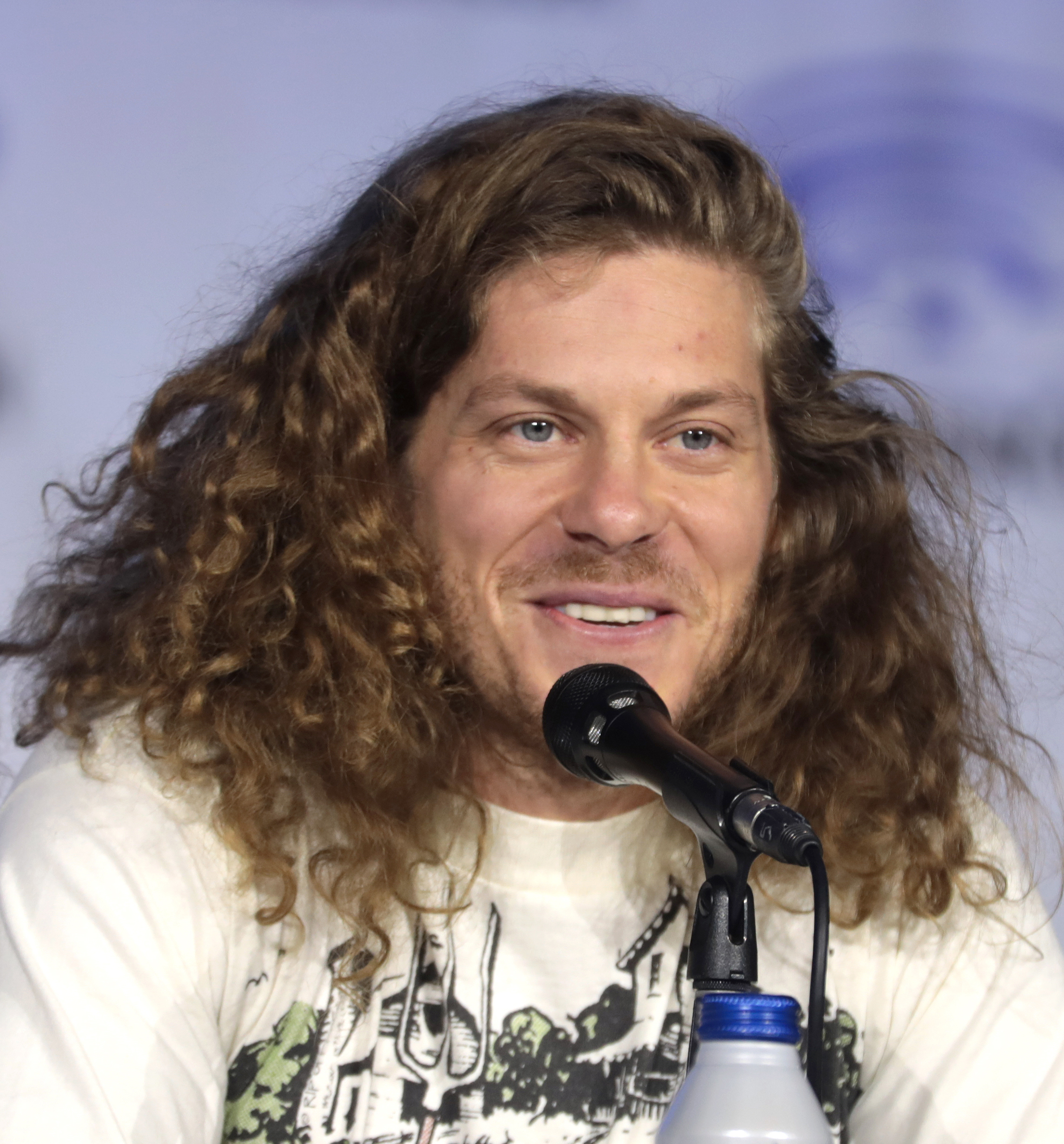
- Anderson at WonderCon 2022
- Born: Blake Raymond Anderson; March 2, 1984 (age 42); Sacramento County, California, U.S.
- Occupations: Actor; comedian; producer; screenwriter; fashion designer
- Years active: 2006–present
- Spouse: Rachael Finley (m. 2012; div. 2017)
- Children: 2

Blake Raymond Anderson (born March 2, 1984) is an American actor, comedian, producer, screenwriter, and fashion designer. Beginning in 2006, Anderson helped create and join the sketch-comedy troupe Mail Order Comedy, which produced online videos and sketches, such as those involving the rap band Wizard Sleeve, along with co-members Anders Holm, Adam DeVine, and Kyle Newacheck. In 2011, Anderson, along with Holm, DeVine, and Newacheck, began starring as fictional versions of themselves in the Comedy Central television series Workaholics, which Anderson co-created. Workaholics ran on the network from 2011 until 2017, airing seven seasons. Anderson has appeared in other film and television works, often with other members of Mail Order Comedy.

In 2017, Anderson was nominated for two Behind the Voice Actors' People's Choice Voice Acting Awards for his work on Voltron: Legendary Defender, winning the nomination for Best Vocal Ensemble in a New Television Series. He was also nominated for a Young Hollywood Award in 2014.

== Early life ==
Anderson was born in Sacramento County, California, on March 2, 1984, and was raised in Concord, California. He attended Clayton Valley High School in Concord, California. He later moved to Los Angeles to work with improvisational comedy troupes such as The Groundlings and Upright Citizens Brigade. While working as a pizza delivery driver, he attended Orange Coast College in Costa Mesa, where he met future comedy partner Adam DeVine.

== Career ==
In 2006, Anderson formed the sketch comedy group Mail Order Comedy with Anders Holm, DeVine, and Kyle Newacheck. They produced videos, which appeared on YouTube. In 2011, he played Tad on the Fox show Traffic Light. Next, he had small roles on HBO's Entourage and the Fox show House. He appeared in episodes of Community, Arrested Development, Parks and Recreation, The Big Bang Theory, The Simpsons, Brooklyn Nine-Nine, and Drunk History, among others. He has starred on the Comedy Central show Workaholics (2011–2017), and the Hulu series Woke (2020–2022). In 2023, he guest starred on Impractical Jokers as a "ganja weasel".

He tours the country to perform his stand-up comedy.

In 2013, he co-created the fashion line Teenage with his then-wife, Rachael Finley.

== Personal life ==
On December 17, 2011, Anderson required surgery after jumping from his roof onto a beer pong table during a house party and fracturing his spine.

On September 7, 2012, Anderson married Rachael Finley. They have one daughter, born in 2014, and were divorced in 2017.

== Filmography ==
=== Film ===
Year	Title	Role	Notes
2008	420 Special: Attack of the Show! from Jamaica	Yung Zeld	Wizard Performance
2009	Ratko: The Dictator's Son	Derek	
2011	The Legend of Awesomest Maximus	Greek Soldier #1	
2013	Epic	Dagda	Voice
2014	Neighbors	Beer Pong Guy #2	Cameo
2015	Dope	Will	
2015	Scouts Guide to the Zombie Apocalypse	Ron the Janitor	Cameo
2018	Game Over, Man!	Joel "Baby Dunc"	Also producer
2018	Show Dogs	Pigeon 3	Voice
2018	The Package	Redneck Reginald	Also producer
2020	Spy Intervention	Smuts	
2021	North Hollywood	School Security Guard	
2022	I'm Totally Fine	Eric	
2023	The Out-Laws	Cousin RJ	
2023	First Time Female Director	Corden	

=== Television ===
Year	Title	Role	Notes
2006–2008	Crossbows & Mustaches		10 episodes, executive producer
2008	Special Delivery	Himself	Episode: "Strike a Pose"
2008	The Dude's House	Blake	3 episodes, co-creator, writer executive producer
2008	5th Year	Blake	5 episodes
2011	Traffic Light	Tad	2 episodes
2011	Entourage	Donny	Episode: "One Last Shot"
2011	House	Ethan	Episode: "Perils of Paranoia"
2011–2017	Workaholics	Blake Henderson	Co-creator, writer, executive producer
2012	Community	Attendant	Episode: "Contemporary Impressionists"
2013	Arrested Development	B. Lake	Episodes: "Flight of the Phoenix" & "Moving Pictures" (Fateful Consequences release)
2013–2014	Loiter Squad	Himself	
2014–2015	Parks and Recreation	Mike Bean	3 episodes
2014	The Eric Andre Show	Himself	1 episode
2015	Hell's Kitchen	Himself	Episode: "17 Chefs Compete"
2015	Comedy Bang! Bang!	Screggie's Real Father	Episode: "Karen Gillan Wears a Black and White Striped Pullover and Coral Skirt"
2015	The Simpsons	Dickie (voice)	Episode: "Halloween of Horror"
2015	Drunk History	Alexei Leonov	Episode: "Space"
2015, 2017	Penn Zero: Part-Time Hero	Hogarth (voice)	2 episodes
2016	Ice Age: The Great Egg-Scapade	Clint (voice)	TV short
2016	The Big Bang Theory	Trevor	Episode: "The Line Substitution Solution"
2016	Teenage Mutant Ninja Turtles: Don vs. Raph	Michelangelo (voice)	Short
2016–2018	Voltron: Legendary Defender	Matt Holt (voice)	Episodes: "The Rise of Voltron", "Return of the Gladiator", "Tears of the Balmera", "Reunion", "Black Site", "A New Defender"
2017	Uncle Grandpa	Ciabatta (voice)	Episode: "Full Grown Pizza"
2017	The Jellies!	RG (voice)	
2018	Brooklyn Nine-Nine	Constantine Kane	Episode: "Bachelor/ette Party"
2018–2020	Tigtone	Poach-Or, Beautiful Horse Head, Lightning King, C.J., Ceruszimar (voice)	6 episodes
2019	Mixed-ish	Cult member	Episode: "Becoming Bow"
2020–2022	Woke	Gunther	16 episodes
2021	The Freak Brothers	Charlie	
2023	Impractical Jokers	Himself	Episode: "Blake Anderson"
2023	Is It Cake?	Himself / Judge	Episode: "Everything Is Cake!"
2025	Abbott Elementary	Park Ranger	Episode: “Camping”

=== Music videos ===
Year	Artist	Song
2019	American Football	"Uncomfortably Numb"
2021	Nekrogoblikon	"Right Now"
2025	Yvette Young	"outta sight outta mind"

=== Web series ===
Year	Title	Role	Notes
2011	Hardly Working		1 episode: "Five Year Hangover"
