= Kyle Newacheck =

American filmmaker, comedian, actor

- Born: January 23, 1984 (age 42)
- Occupations: Writer; director; producer; actor
- Years active: Since 2004
- Children: 2

Kyle Newacheck (born January 23, 1984) is an American television writer, director, producer and actor. He is one of the creators of the Comedy Central show Workaholics, in which he also co-starred. He is a producer and director on the FX comedy horror series What We Do in the Shadows.

Newacheck is also a professional pickleball player signed to the Selkirk Emerging Pros team.

== Life and career ==
Originally from Concord, California, Newacheck graduated from the Los Angeles Film School in 2004 with a degree in editing. He worked as an editing teacher at his alma mater before forming the sketch comedy group Mail Order Comedy with Blake Anderson, Adam DeVine and Anders Holm in 2006.

Newacheck began writing, directing and editing comedy short films with Mail Order Comedy, most notably the "Crossbows and Moustaches" web series for MySpace. In 2011, Newacheck co-created Workaholics, a Comedy Central series which aired for seven seasons, which revolves around three slackers and their drug dealer. Newacheck co-stars in the series as the drug dealer Karl Hevacheck.

Newacheck directed approximately half of the Workaholics episodes. He has since become a television comedy director, directing episodes of Community, Parks and Recreation, Happy Endings and others. He is currently set to direct an untitled TV movie written by Greg Daniels and Robert Padnick.

Newacheck collaborated with Mail Order Comedy partner DeVine for his show Adam DeVine's House Party. Newacheck is the co-creator, director, and occasional star.

He directed the music video for Childish Gambino's "The Worst Guys" in 2014 alongside his brother, Adam.

In June 2016 it was announced that Devine, Anderson, Holm and Newacheck were working on a film with Seth Rogen as producer. The film, Game Over, Man!, debuted on Netflix in 2018.

From 2020 to 2024, he was a co-executive producer and director on the FX series What We Do in the Shadows.

== Filmography ==
=== Director ===
Film

Year	Title	Director	Executive Producer	Writer
2018	Game Over, Man!	Yes	Yes	Story
2019	Murder Mystery	Yes	Yes	No
2025	Happy Gilmore 2	Yes	No	No
TBA	Grown Ups 3	Yes	No	No

Television

Year	Title	Director	Writer	Creator	Executive Producer	Notes
2006	Mail Order Comedy	Yes	Yes	No	Yes	TV movie
2006–2008	Crossbows and Mustaches	Yes	Yes	No	No	All 10 episodes
2007	Online Nation	Yes	Yes	No	No	Segments "Arm Wrestling Champion, Diet Coke & Mentos"
2007–2008	Preppy Hippies	Yes	No	No	No	All 8 episodes, also producer
2008	The Dude's House	Yes	Yes	Yes	Yes	All 3 episodes
2008	Super Seniors	Yes	Yes	No	Yes	TV short
2008	420 Special: Attack of the Show! from Jamaica	Yes	Yes	No	No	TV special
2008	Prototank	Yes	Yes	Yes	Yes	
2008	5th Year	Yes	No	No	No	All 5 episodes
2011–2017	Workaholics	Yes	Yes	Yes	Yes	Directed 41 episodes, Wrote 3 episodes
2012	Community	Yes	No	No	No	2 episodes
2012	Parks and Recreation	Yes	No	No	No	Episode "Soda Tax"
2012–2013	Happy Endings	Yes	No	No	No	3 episodes
2013	Untitled Greg Daniels & Robert Padnick	Yes	No	No	No	TV movie
2013–2016	Adam Devine's House Party	Yes	No	Yes	Yes	8 episodes
2016	Idiotsitter	Yes	No	No	No	Episode "Viva La Joy"
2017	Ghosted	Yes	No	No	No	Episode "The Machine"
2020–2024	What We Do in the Shadows	Yes	No	No	Yes	20 episodes
2023	Bookie	Yes	No	No	No	Episode "Nepo Bookies"
2026	Stuart Fails to Save the Universe	Yes	No	No	Yes	6 episodes

Music video

Year	Artist	Title
2012	Childish Gambino	"Heartbeat"
2014	Childish Gambino	"The Worst Guys" (featuring Chance the Rapper)

=== Actor ===
Film

Year	Title	Role
2014	Neighbors	Beer Pong Guy #4
2022	I'm Totally Fine	The Towny

Television

Year	Title	Role	Notes
2011–2017	Workaholics	Karl Hevacheck	Series regular
2013–2016	Adam Devine's House Party	Himself	8 episodes
2015	CSI: Crime Scene Investigation	Paramedic	Episode: "Immortality, Part One"

== Awards and nominations ==
Year	Awards	Category	Work	Result
2022	Primetime Emmy Awards	Outstanding Comedy Series	What We Do in the Shadows	Nominated
