= List of highest-grossing films in the United States and Canada =

The following is a list of the highest-grossing films in the United States and Canada, a market known as the North American box office or, in the United States film industry, the domestic box office.

== Nominal figures ==
This is a list of the highest-grossing films in the U.S. and Canada in US dollars, ranked by lifetime gross. This ranking does not adjust for inflation.

The list also includes the initial gross without adjustments.

† Background shading indicates films playing in the week commencing 20 November 2026 in theaters around the world.

Rank	Title	Initial gross	Lifetime gross	Year
1	Spider-Man: Brand New Day †	$959,059,276	$959,059,276	2026
2	Star Wars: The Force Awakens	$936,662,225	$936,662,225	2015
3	Avengers: Endgame	$858,373,000	$898,471,864	2019
4	Spider-Man: No Way Home	$804,793,477	$814,811,535	2021
5	Avatar	$749,766,139	$785,221,649	2009
6	Top Gun: Maverick	$718,732,821	$721,996,984	2022
7	Black Panther	$700,426,566	$700,426,566	2018
8	Avatar: The Way of Water	$684,075,767	$688,459,501	2022
9	Avengers: Infinity War	$678,815,482	$678,815,482	2018
10	Titanic	$600,788,188	$674,276,105	1997
11	Jurassic World	$652,270,625	$653,406,625	2015
12	Inside Out 2	$652,980,194	$652,980,194	2024
13	Barbie	$636,785,476	$636,785,476	2023
14	Deadpool & Wolverine	$636,745,858	$636,745,858	2024
15	The Odyssey	$625,595,435	$625,595,435	2026
16	The Avengers	$623,357,910	$623,357,910	2012
17	Star Wars: The Last Jedi	$620,181,382	$620,181,382	2017
18	Incredibles 2	$608,581,744	$608,581,744	2018
19	The Super Mario Bros. Movie	$574,934,330	$574,934,330	2023
20	The Lion King	$543,638,043	$543,638,043	2019
21	The Dark Knight	$533,345,358	$534,987,076	2008
22	Rogue One: A Star Wars Story	$532,177,324	$533,539,991	2016
23	Star Wars: The Rise of Skywalker	$515,202,542	$515,202,542	2019
24	Beauty and the Beast	$504,014,165	$504,481,165	2017
25	Star Wars: Episode I – The Phantom Menace	$431,088,301	$487,576,624	1999
26	Finding Dory	$486,295,561	$486,295,561	2016
27	Toy Story 5	$480,294,461	$480,294,461	2026
28	Frozen 2	$477,373,578	$477,373,578	2019
29	Wicked	$473,231,120	$474,983,975	2024
30	Star Wars	$221,280,994^{*}	$460,998,007	1977
31	Moana 2	$460,405,297	$460,405,297	2024
32	Avengers: Age of Ultron	$459,005,868	$459,005,868	2015
33	Black Panther: Wakanda Forever	$453,829,060	$453,829,060	2022
34	The Dark Knight Rises	$448,139,099	$448,149,584	2012
35	Shrek 2	$441,426,807	$444,978,202	2004
36	E.T. the Extra-Terrestrial	$359,197,037	$439,251,124	1982
37	Toy Story 4	$434,038,008	$434,038,008	2019
38	The Super Mario Galaxy Movie	$429,814,610	$429,814,610	2026
39	Zootopia 2	$428,130,160	$428,130,160	2025
40	Captain Marvel	$426,829,839	$426,829,839	2019
41	The Lion King	$312,855,561^{*}	$424,979,720	1994
42	The Hunger Games: Catching Fire	$424,668,047	$425,316,659	2013
43	A Minecraft Movie	$424,087,780	$424,087,780	2025
44	Lilo & Stitch	$423,778,855	$423,778,855	2025
45	Pirates of the Caribbean: Dead Man's Chest	$423,315,812	$423,315,812	2006
46	Jurassic World: Fallen Kingdom	$417,719,760	$417,719,760	2018
47	Toy Story 3	$415,004,880	$415,004,880	2010
48	Star Wars: Episode III – Revenge of the Sith	$380,270,577	$414,378,291	2005
49	Wonder Woman	$412,563,408	$412,845,172	2017
50	Doctor Strange in the Multiverse of Madness	$411,331,607	$411,331,607	2022
51	Iron Man 3	$409,013,994	$409,013,994	2013
52	Captain America: Civil War	$408,084,349	$408,084,349	2016
53	The Hunger Games	$408,010,692	$408,010,692	2012
54	Spider-Man	$403,706,375	$407,234,458 (Note: Spider-Man grossed approximately $4 million from September 6–15, 2002, as a double feature with Men in Black II. Box Office Mojo incorrectly reports the domestic gross of this reissue as $6,632,970, even though it has the reissue grossing $3,971,552 by its own daily reporting, and allots half of it to its lifetime domestic gross, as well as one-eighth of a 2024 reissue with seven other Spider-Man films and one-third of a 2025 reissue as a triple feature with Spider-Man 2 and Spider-Man 3, for a total of $408,524,875. The Numbers reports a $4,052,137 gross from the 2002 reissue and does not include multi-film reissues in its lifetime gross.)	2002
55	Jurassic Park	$356,763,175	$407,185,075	1993
56	Jumanji: Welcome to the Jungle	$404,515,480	$404,515,480	2017
57	Avatar: Fire and Ash	$404,340,010	$404,340,010	2025
58	Transformers: Revenge of the Fallen	$402,111,870	$402,111,870	2009
59	Frozen	$400,738,009	$400,953,009	2013
60	Spider-Man: Far From Home	$390,532,085	$390,882,621	2019
61	Guardians of the Galaxy Vol. 2	$389,813,101	$389,813,101	2017
62	The Lord of the Rings: The Return of the King	$377,027,325	$385,849,559	2003
63	Spider-Man: Across the Spider-Verse	$381,311,319	$381,593,754	2023
64	Harry Potter and the Deathly Hallows – Part 2	$381,011,219	$381,447,587	2011
65	Finding Nemo	$339,714,978	$380,843,261	2003
66	Jurassic World Dominion	$376,851,080	$376,851,080	2022
67	Spider-Man 2	$373,585,825	$375,828,527	2004
68	Michael	$372,303,388	$372,303,388	2026
69	The Passion of the Christ	$370,274,604	$370,782,930	2004
70	Minions: The Rise of Gru	$369,695,210	$369,695,210	2022
71	The Batman	$369,345,583	$369,345,583	2022
72	The Secret Life of Pets	$368,384,330	$368,384,330	2016
73	Despicable Me 2	$368,061,265	$368,061,265	2013
74	The Jungle Book	$364,001,123	$364,001,123	2016
75	Deadpool	$363,070,709	$363,070,709	2016
76	Despicable Me 4	$361,004,205	$361,004,205	2024
77	Guardians of the Galaxy Vol. 3	$358,995,815	$358,995,815	2023
78	Inside Out	$356,461,711	$356,921,711	2015
79	Aladdin	$355,559,216	$355,559,216	2019
80	Superman	$354,184,465	$354,184,465	2025
81	Furious 7	$353,007,020	$353,007,020	2015
82	Transformers: Dark of the Moon	$352,390,543	$352,390,543	2011
83	American Sniper	$350,126,372	$350,126,372	2014
84	The Lord of the Rings: The Two Towers	$339,789,881	$349,612,565	2002
85	Project Hail Mary	$344,050,007	$344,050,007	2026
86	Thor: Love and Thunder	$343,256,830	$343,256,830	2022
87	Wicked: For Good	$342,915,090	$342,915,090	2025
88	Zootopia	$341,268,248	$341,268,248	2016
89	Jurassic World Rebirth	$339,640,400	$339,640,400	2025
90	Spider-Man 3	$336,530,303	$338,032,318	2007
91	The Hunger Games: Mockingjay – Part 1	$337,135,885	$337,135,885	2014
92	Minions	$336,045,770	$336,045,770	2015
93	Joker	$335,451,311	$335,477,657	2019
94	Aquaman	$335,061,807	$335,104,314	2018
95	Spider-Man: Homecoming	$334,201,140	$334,576,561	2017
96	Alice in Wonderland	$334,191,110	$334,191,110	2010
97	Guardians of the Galaxy	$333,176,600	$333,718,600	2014
98	Forrest Gump	$329,694,499	$330,455,270	1994
99	Batman v Superman: Dawn of Justice	$330,360,194	$330,360,194	2016
100	Oppenheimer	$329,862,540	$330,078,895	2023

^{*} These films fall outside the top 100 when considering only initial gross, and would be replaced by It ($328.87m) and Suicide Squad ($325.10m).

== Adjusted for ticket-price inflation ==
This is a list of films ranked by ticket sales with adjustments for changes in ticket prices and/or inflation.

For films released in 2019 or earlier: Box Office Mojo tracks average ticket prices at theaters from 1910 to 2020. The list here starts with their "Adj. Lifetime Gross" based on 2020 ticket prices, and then applies Template:Inflation to further adjust to the equivalent in 2025.

For films released in 2020 or later: This list starts with the film's lifetime gross, and then applies Template:Inflation as if the entire lifetime gross was earned in the year of release, to further adjust to the equivalent in 2025.

Many of the films on this list were released prior to the availability of home video and have had multiple releases.

† Background shading indicates films playing in the week commencing 20 November 2026 in theaters around the world.

Rank	Title	Year	Est. tickets	Adjusted gross
1	Gone with the Wind	1939	202,286,200	$2,358,005,001
2	Star Wars	1977	178,119,500	$2,076,299,183
3	The Sound of Music	1965	142,676,490	$1,662,519,353
4	E.T. the Extra-Terrestrial	1982	142,045,058	$1,655,798,022
5	Titanic	1997	136,912,791	$1,595,959,682
6	The Ten Commandments	1956	131,000,000	$1,527,037,707
7	Jaws	1975	129,839,871	$1,512,355,980
8	Doctor Zhivago	1965	124,135,500	$1,447,019,766
9	The Exorcist	1973	110,599,200	$1,289,230,144
10	Snow White and the Seven Dwarfs	1937	109,000,000	$1,270,588,627
11	Star Wars: The Force Awakens	2015	108,115,100	$1,260,273,545
12	One Hundred and One Dalmatians	1961	99,917,300	$1,164,713,624
13	Avengers: Endgame	2019	^{T}95,268,900	$1,150,627,128
14	The Empire Strikes Back	1980	98,273,100	$1,145,547,552
15	Ben-Hur	1959	98,046,900	$1,142,910,789
16	Return of the Jedi	1983	94,717,598	$1,104,100,840
17	Jurassic Park	1993	91,933,497	$1,073,227,303
18	Star Wars: Episode I – The Phantom Menace	1999	91,144,539	$1,066,120,734
19	The Lion King	1994	89,527,781	$1,041,413,364
20	The Sting	1973	89,142,900	$1,039,118,852
21	Raiders of the Lost Ark	1981	88,543,400	$1,032,130,615
22	The Graduate	1967	85,576,800	$997,548,456
23	Fantasia	1940	83,043,500	$968,019,510
24	Spider-Man: No Way Home	2021	83,039,254	$967,175,183
25	Spider-Man: Brand New Day †	2026	—N/a	$959,059,276
26	Avatar	2009	79,333,713	$924,761,705
27	The Godfather	1972	79,056,084	$921,538,321
28	Forrest Gump	1994	78,637,100	$916,655,091
29	Mary Poppins	1964	78,181,800	$911,347,761
30	Grease	1978	77,098,600	$898,721,140
31	The Avengers	2012	76,881,200	$896,186,957
32	Jurassic World	2015	76,812,326	$895,399,211
33	Black Panther	2018	76,311,500	$889,546,092
34	Thunderball	1965	74,800,000	$871,926,874
35	The Dark Knight	2008	74,463,500	$868,004,369
36	The Jungle Book	1967	73,679,900	$858,870,119
37	Sleeping Beauty	1959	72,676,000	$847,167,881
38	Avengers: Infinity War	2018	72,419,700	$844,180,249
39	Shrek 2	2004	71,667,690	$831,869,277
40	Ghostbusters	1984	71,313,213	$831,333,626
41	Spider-Man	2002	70,720,735	$824,964,521
42	Butch Cassidy and the Sundance Kid	1969	70,557,900	$822,477,663
43	Love Story	1970	70,014,500	$816,143,371
44	Independence Day	1996	69,268,900	$807,452,078
45	Top Gun: Maverick	2022	^{T}67,843,975	$797,265,197
46	Home Alone	1990	67,734,200	$789,562,423
47	Star Wars: The Last Jedi	2017	67,594,500	$787,933,972
48	Pinocchio	1940	67,403,300	$785,705,196
49	Cleopatra	1963	67,183,500	$783,143,037
50	Beverly Hills Cop	1984	67,150,000	$782,752,535
51	Goldfinger	1964	66,300,000	$772,844,275
52	Incredibles 2	2018	66,299,200	$772,834,949
53	Airport	1970	66,111,300	$770,644,641
54	American Graffiti	1973	65,714,300	$766,016,901
55	The Robe	1953	65,454,500	$762,988,470
56	Avatar: The Way of Water	2022	64,960,159	$756,991,540
57	Pirates of the Caribbean: Dead Man's Chest	2006	64,628,400	$753,358,807
58	Around the World in 80 Days	1956	64,615,400	$753,207,269
59	Bambi	1942	63,712,400	$742,681,200
60	Blazing Saddles	1974	63,239,600	$737,169,876
61	Batman	1989	62,972,300	$734,054,020
62	The Bells of St. Mary's	1945	62,745,100	$731,405,600
63	Star Wars: Episode III – Revenge of the Sith	2005	62,340,313	$725,641,311
64	The Lord of the Rings: The Return of the King	2003	^{T}61,961,612	$726,249,695
65	Finding Nemo	2003	61,586,500	$717,900,059
66	The Towering Inferno	1974	61,375,700	$715,442,811
67	Rogue One: A Star Wars Story	2016	60,441,600	$704,554,216
68	Spider-Man 2	2004	60,359,207	$703,562,421
69	The Lion King	2019	60,322,700	$703,168,225
70	Cinderella	1950	60,301,400	$702,919,936
71	My Fair Lady	1964	60,062,200	$700,131,635
72	The Greatest Show on Earth	1952	60,000,000	$699,406,584
73	Back to the Future	1985	59,955,879	$698,950,782
74	Animal House	1978	59,890,300	$698,127,835
75	The Passion of the Christ	2004	59,704,800	$695,965,503
76	The Lord of the Rings: The Two Towers	2002	^{T}57,950,830	$679,619,650
77	Barbie	2023	57,682,540	$672,303,050
78	The Dark Knight Rises	2012	57,581,800	$671,218,167
79	The Sixth Sense	1999	57,579,100	$671,186,694
80	Inside Out 2	2024	57,524,327	$670,158,415
81	Superman	1978	57,384,000	$668,912,456
82	Tootsie	1982	56,903,900	$663,316,038
83	Beauty and the Beast	2017	56,848,000	$662,664,424
84	Smokey and the Bandit	1977	56,832,900	$662,488,407
85	Harry Potter and the Sorcerer's Stone	2001	56,215,669	$655,398,456
86	Finding Dory	2016	56,158,100	$654,622,414
87	Deadpool & Wolverine	2024	56,094,106	$653,496,995
88	West Side Story	1961	56,012,800	$652,928,685
89	Close Encounters of the Third Kind	1977	55,922,700	$651,878,409
90	Lady and the Tramp	1955	55,734,900	$649,689,267
91	The Lord of the Rings: The Fellowship of the Ring	2001	^{T}55,085,361	$648,065,850
92	Lawrence of Arabia	1962	55,437,000	$646,216,713
93	The Rocky Horror Picture Show	1975	55,315,073	$642,067,560
94	Rocky	1976	55,040,000	$641,588,973
95	The Best Years of Our Lives	1946	55,000,000	$641,122,702
96	Star Wars: The Rise of Skywalker	2019	54,984,300	$640,939,690
97	The Poseidon Adventure	1972	54,902,000	$639,980,337
98	Twister	1996	54,688,100	$637,486,953
99	Men in Black	1997	54,616,700	$636,654,659
100	The Bridge on the River Kwai	1957	54,400,000	$634,128,636

^{T}Excluding figures from the 2026 re-releases.

=== Factors in determining "adjusted gross" ===
No one yet has calculated a truly precise and definite referential adjusted gross for a film, since doing so would have to take into account most (or all) of the following:

- Box office gross on initial release
- Ticket price at time of release, or its relative price to other commodities in a given year, in relation to general inflation and gross domestic product.
- Economic conditions that may help or hurt the entertainment industry as a whole (theaters in 2008 lowered ticket prices to attract more viewers though the average ticket cost $7.00)
- Population at time of release—to be used to calculate:
- Availability of films (number of theaters and screens, number of prints)
- Competition of other media (television, internet, home video, film piracy)
- Total number of films in the marketplace at a given time
- Screen quotas (no influence on U.S. box office)
- Price differences: matinee and evening tickets, roadshow tickets, or difference between rural and urban cinemas
- Length of release (number of weeks)

Further explanation of issues with calculating an adjusted gross can be found in the article for List of highest-grossing films.

== Franchises and film series, nominal figures ==
This is a list of highest-grossing franchises and film series in the U.S. and Canada.

† Background shading indicates that at least one film in the series is playing in the week commencing 20 November 2026 in theaters around the world.

(The films in each franchise can be viewed by selecting "show")

Rank	Series	Total box office	No. of films	Average of films	Highest-grossing film

1
Marvel Cinematic Universe †
$14,102,799,311
38
$371,126,298
Spider-Man: Brand New Day ($959,059,276)

The Infinity Saga	$8,587,636,078	23	$373,375,482	Avengers: Endgame ($898,471,864)
/ Phase Three / $4,992,249,332 / 11 / $453,840,848 / Avengers: Endgame ($898,471,864); 1 / Avengers: Endgame (2019) / $898,471,864; 2 / Black Panther (2018) / $700,426,566; 3 / Avengers: Infinity War (2018) / $678,815,482; 4 / Captain Marvel (2019) / $426,829,839; 5 / Captain America: Civil War (2016) / $408,084,349; 6 / Spider-Man: Far From Home (2019) / $390,882,621; 7 / Guardians of the Galaxy Vol. 2 (2017) / $389,813,101; 8 / Spider-Man: Homecoming (2017) / $334,576,561; 9 / Thor: Ragnarok (2017) / $315,058,289; 10 / Doctor Strange (2016) / $232,641,920; 11 / Ant-Man and the Wasp (2018) / $216,648,740
/ Phase Two / $1,848,069,337 / 6 / $308,011,556 / Avengers: Age of Ultron ($459,005,868); 1 / Avengers: Age of Ultron (2015) / $459,005,868; 2 / Iron Man 3 (2013) / $409,013,994; 3 / Guardians of the Galaxy (2014) / $333,718,600; 4 / Captain America: The Winter Soldier (2014) / $259,766,572; 5 / Thor: The Dark World (2013) / $206,362,140; 6 / Ant-Man (2015) / $180,202,163
/ Phase One / $1,747,317,409 / 6 / $291,219,568 / The Avengers ($623,357,910); 1 / The Avengers (2012) / $623,357,910; 2 / Iron Man (2008) / $319,034,126; 3 / Iron Man 2 (2010) / $312,433,331; 4 / Thor (2011) / $181,030,624; 5 / Captain America: The First Avenger (2011) / $176,654,505; 6 / The Incredible Hulk (2008) / $134,806,913

The Multiverse Saga †	$5,515,163,233	15	$367,677,549	Spider-Man: Brand New Day ($959,059,276)
/ Phase Four / $2,596,294,213 / 7 / $370,899,173 / Spider-Man: No Way Home ($814,811,535); 1 / Spider-Man: No Way Home (2021) / $814,811,535; 2 / Black Panther: Wakanda Forever (2022) / $453,829,060; 3 / Doctor Strange in the Multiverse of Madness (2022) / $411,331,607; 4 / Thor: Love and Thunder (2022) / $343,256,830; 5 / Shang-Chi and the Legend of the Ten Rings (2021) / $224,543,292; 6 / Black Widow (2021) / $183,651,655; 7 / Eternals (2021) / $164,870,234
/ Phase Five / $1,685,523,134 / 6 / $280,920,522 / Deadpool & Wolverine ($636,742,741); 1 / Deadpool & Wolverine (2024) / $636,745,858; 2 / Guardians of the Galaxy Vol. 3 (2023) / $358,995,815; 3 / Ant-Man and the Wasp: Quantumania (2023) / $214,506,909; 4 / Captain America: Brave New World (2025) / $200,500,001; 5 / Thunderbolts* (2025) / $190,274,328; 6 / The Marvels (2023) / $84,500,223
/ Phase Six † / $1,233,345,886 / 2 / $616,672,943 / Spider-Man: Brand New Day ($959,059,276); 1 / Spider-Man: Brand New Day (2026) † / $959,059,276; 2 / The Fantastic Four: First Steps (2025) / $274,286,610

2	Spider-Man †	$5,366,734,528	17	$315,690,266	Brand New Day ($959,059,276)
/ Marvel Cinematic Universe † / $2,499,329,993 / 4 / $624,832,498 / Brand New Day ($959,059,276); 1 / Brand New Day (2026) † / $959,059,276; 2 / No Way Home (2021) / $814,811,535; 3 / Far From Home (2019) / $390,882,621; 4 / Homecoming (2017) / $334,576,561
/ Raimi series / $1,119,791,208 / 3 / $373,263,736 / Spider-Man ($405,930,363); 1 / Spider-Man (2002) / $405,930,363; 2 / Spider-Man 2 (2004) / $375,828,527; 3 / Spider-Man 3 (2007) / $338,032,318
/ Sony's Spider-Man Universe / $709,530,700 / 6 / $118,255,117 / Venom: Let There Be Carnage ($213,550,366); 1 / Venom: Let There Be Carnage (2021) / $213,550,366; 2 / Venom (2018) / $213,515,506; 3 / Venom: The Last Dance (2024) / $139,755,882; 4 / Morbius (2022) / $73,865,530; 5 / Madame Web (2024) / $43,817,106; 6 / Kraven the Hunter (2024) / $25,026,310
/ Spider-Verse / $571,835,064 / 2 / $285,917,532 / Across the Spider-Verse ($381,593,754); 1 / Across the Spider-Verse (2023) / $381,593,754; 2 / Into the Spider-Verse (2018) / $190,241,310
/ The Amazing Spider-Man series / $466,247,563 / 2 / $233,123,782 / The Amazing Spider-Man ($262,717,220); 1 / The Amazing Spider-Man (2012) / $262,717,220; 2 / The Amazing Spider-Man 2 (2014) / $203,530,343

3	Star Wars	$5,315,083,123	13	$408,852,548	The Force Awakens ($936,662,225)
Skywalker saga / $4,352,291,198 / 9 / $483,587,911 / The Force Awakens ($936,662,225); / Sequel trilogy / $2,072,046,149 / 3 / $690,682,050 / The Force Awakens ($936,662,225); 1 / VII: The Force Awakens (2015) / $936,662,225; 2 / VIII: The Last Jedi (2017) / $620,181,382; 3 / IX: The Rise of Skywalker (2019) / $515,202,542 / Prequel trilogy / $1,212,631,655 / 3 / $404,210,552 / The Phantom Menace ($487,576,624); 1 / I: The Phantom Menace (1999) / $487,576,624; 2 / III: Revenge of the Sith (2005) / $414,378,291; 3 / II: Attack of the Clones (2002) / $310,676,740 / Original trilogy / $1,070,216,970 / 3 / $356,738,990 / Star Wars ($460,998,007); 1 / IV: A New Hope (1977) / $460,998,007; 2 / VI: Return of the Jedi (1983) / $316,465,003; 3 / V: The Empire Strikes Back (1980) / $292,753,960
/ Anthology films / $747,307,503 / 2 / $373,653,752 / Rogue One ($533,539,991); 1 / Rogue One (2016) / $533,539,991; 2 / Solo (2018) / $213,767,512
The Mandalorian and Grogu (2026) / $177,730,060
The Clone Wars (2008) / $35,161,554

4	Batman †	$3,280,786,871	17	$192,987,463	The Dark Knight ($534,858,444)
/ The Dark Knight Trilogy / $1,188,341,317 / 3 / $396,113,772 / The Dark Knight ($534,858,444); 1 / The Dark Knight (2008) / $534,858,444; 2 / The Dark Knight Rises (2012) / $448,139,099; 3 / Batman Begins (2005) / $205,343,774
/ Burton/Schumacher series / $705,564,945 / 4 / $176,391,236 / Batman ($251,348,343); 1 / Batman (1989) / $251,348,343; 2 / Batman Forever (1995) / $184,031,112; 3 / Batman Returns (1992) / $162,831,698; 4 / Batman & Robin (1997) / $107,353,792
/ Joker series / $393,748,391 / 2 / $196,874,196 / Joker ($335,448,104); 1 / Joker (2019) / $335,448,104; 2 / Folie à Deux (2024) / $58,300,287
The Batman (2022) / $369,345,583
Batman v Superman: Dawn of Justice (2016) / $330,360,194
The Lego Batman Movie (2017) / $175,936,671
Clayface (2026) † / $66,195,000
Catwoman (2004) / $40,202,379
Mask of the Phantasm (1993) / $5,617,391
The Killing Joke (2016) / $3,775,000
Batman: The Movie (1966) / $1,700,000

5	X-Men	$3,095,208,213	14	$221,086,301	Deadpool & Wolverine ($636,745,858)
/ Deadpool series / $1,324,408,302 / 3 / $441,469,434 / Deadpool & Wolverine ($636,745,858); 1 / Deadpool & Wolverine (2024) / $636,745,858; 2 / Deadpool (2016) / $363,070,709; 3 / Deadpool 2 (2018) / $324,591,735
/ Main series / $1,208,230,175 / 7 / $172,604,311 / The Last Stand ($234,362,462); 1 / The Last Stand (2006) / $234,362,462; 2 / Days of Future Past (2014) / $233,921,534; 3 / X2 (2003) / $214,949,694; 4 / X-Men (2000) / $157,299,717; 5 / Apocalypse (2016) / $155,442,489; 6 / First Class (2011) / $146,408,305; 7 / Dark Phoenix (2019) / $65,845,974
/ Wolverine series / $538,717,077 / 3 / $179,572,359 / Logan ($226,277,068); 1 / Logan (2017) / $226,277,068; 2 / Origins: Wolverine (2009) / $179,883,157; 3 / The Wolverine (2013) / $132,556,852
The New Mutants (2020) / $23,852,659

6
Wizarding World
$2,885,518,716
11
$262,319,883
Harry Potter and the Deathly Hallows – Part 2 ($381,447,587)

	Harry Potter series	$2,396,319,863	8	$299,539,983	Deathly Hallows – Part 2 ($381,193,157)
1	Deathly Hallows – Part 2 (2011)	$381,447,587			
2	Sorcerer's Stone (2001)	$318,886,962			
3	Half-Blood Prince (2009)	$302,334,374			
4	Deathly Hallows – Part 1 (2010)	$296,374,621			
5	Order of the Phoenix (2007)	$292,382,727			
6	Goblet of Fire (2005)	$290,469,928			
7	Chamber of Secrets (2002)	$262,641,637			
8	Prisoner of Azkaban (2004)	$250,105,651			
9	IMAX Marathon (2016)	$1,676,376			

	Fantastic Beasts series	$489,444,320	3	$163,148,107	Where to Find Them ($234,037,575)
1	Where to Find Them (2016)	$234,037,575			
2	The Crimes of Grindelwald (2018)	$159,555,901			
3	The Secrets of Dumbledore (2022)	$95,850,844			

7	DC Extended Universe	$2,781,164,367	15	$185,410,958	Wonder Woman ($412,815,408)
1	Wonder Woman (2017)	$412,815,408			
2	Aquaman (2018)	$335,061,807			
3	Batman v Superman: Dawn of Justice (2016)	$330,360,194			
4	Suicide Squad (2016)	$325,100,054			
5	Man of Steel (2013)	$291,045,518			
6	Justice League (2017)	$229,024,295			
7	Black Adam (2022)	$168,152,111			
8	Shazam! (2019)	$140,371,656			
9	Aquaman and the Lost Kingdom (2023)	$124,481,226			
10	The Flash (2023)	$108,133,313			
11	Birds of Prey (2020)	$84,158,461			
12	Blue Beetle (2023)	$72,488,072			
13	Shazam! Fury of the Gods (2023)	$57,638,006			
14	The Suicide Squad (2021)	$55,800,219			
15	Wonder Woman 1984 (2020)	$46,534,027			

8	Avengers	$2,659,651,124	4	$664,912,781	Endgame ($898,471,864)
1	Endgame (2019)	$898,471,864			
2	Infinity War (2018)	$678,815,482			
3	The Avengers (2012)	$623,357,910			
4	Age of Ultron (2015)	$459,005,868			

9
Jurassic Park
$2,605,061,494
7
$372,151,642
Jurassic World ($652,270,625)

	Jurassic World series	$1,787,617,865	4	$446,904,466	Jurassic World ($652,270,625)
1	Jurassic World (2015)	$653,406,625			
2	Fallen Kingdom (2018)	$417,719,760			
3	Dominion (2022)	$376,851,080			
4	Rebirth (2025)	$339,640,400			

	Jurassic Park trilogy	$817,443,629	3	$272,481,210	Jurassic Park ($407,185,075)
1	Jurassic Park (1993)	$407,185,075			
2	The Lost World (1997)	$229,086,679			
3	Jurassic Park III (2001)	$181,171,875			

10	James Bond	$2,296,541,127	27	$85,057,079	Skyfall ($304,360,277)
Eon series / $2,218,363,568 / 25 / $88,734,543 / Skyfall ($304,360,277); / Daniel Craig's Bond / $1,001,140,280 / 5 / $200,228,056 / Skyfall ($304,360,277); 1 / Skyfall (2012) / $304,360,277; 2 / Spectre (2015) / $200,074,609; 3 / Quantum of Solace (2008) / $168,368,427; 4 / Casino Royale (2006) / $167,445,960; 5 / No Time to Die (2021) / $160,891,007 / Pierce Brosnan's Bond / $519,620,040 / 4 / $129,905,010 / Die Another Day ($160,942,139); 1 / Die Another Day (2002) / $160,942,139; 2 / The World Is Not Enough (1999) / $126,943,684; 3 / Tomorrow Never Dies (1997) / $125,304,276; 4 / GoldenEye (1995) / $106,429,941 / Roger Moore's Bond / $346,530,989 / 7 / $49,504,427 / Moonraker ($70,308,099); 1 / Moonraker (1979) / $70,308,099; 2 / Octopussy (1983) / $67,893,619; 3 / For Your Eyes Only (1981) / $54,812,802; 4 / A View to a Kill (1985) / $50,327,960; 5 / The Spy Who Loved Me (1977) / $46,838,673; 6 / Live and Let Die (1973) / $35,377,836; 7 / The Man with the Golden Gun (1974) / $20,972,000 / Sean Connery's Bond / $242,444,854 / 6 / $40,407,476 / Thunderball ($63,595,658); 1 / Thunderball (1965) / $63,595,658; 2 / Goldfinger (1964) / $51,081,062; 3 / Diamonds Are Forever (1971) / $43,819,547; 4 / You Only Live Twice (1967) / $43,084,787; 5 / From Russia with Love (1963) / $24,796,765; 6 / Dr. No (1962) / $16,067,035 / Timothy Dalton's Bond / $85,852,912 / 2 / $42,926,456 / The Living Daylights ($51,185,897); 1 / The Living Daylights (1987) / $51,185,897; 2 / Licence to Kill (1989) / $34,667,015 / George Lazenby's Bond / $22,774,493 / 1 / $22,774,493 / On Her Majesty's Secret Service ($22,774,493); 1 / On Her Majesty's Secret Service (1969) / $22,774,493
Never Say Never Again (1983) / $55,432,841
Casino Royale (1967) / $22,744,718

11
Despicable Me
$2,134,115,995
7
$304,873,714
Minions: The Rise of Gru ($369,695,210)

	Main series	$1,246,008,480	4	$311,502,120	Despicable Me 2 ($368,061,265)
1	Despicable Me 2 (2013)	$368,865,990			
2	Despicable Me 4 (2024)	$361,004,205			
3	Despicable Me 3 (2017)	$264,624,300			
4	Despicable Me (2010)	$251,513,985			

	Minions series	$888,912,240	3	$296,304,080	The Rise of Gru ($369,695,210)
1	The Rise of Gru (2022)	$369,695,210			
2	Minions (2015)	$336,045,770			
3	Minions & Monsters (2026)	$183,171,260			

12
Fast & Furious
$2,014,151,876
11
$183,104,716
Furious 7 ($353,007,020)

	The Fast Saga	$1,840,194,941	10	$184,019,494	Furious 7 ($353,007,020)
1	Furious 7 (2015)	$353,007,020			
2	Fast & Furious 6 (2013)	$238,679,850			
3	The Fate of the Furious (2017)	$226,008,385			
4	Fast Five (2011)	$209,837,675			
5	F9 (2021)	$173,005,945			
6	Fast & Furious (2009)	$155,064,265			
7	The Fast and the Furious (2001)	$148,961,825			
8	Fast X (2023)	$145,960,660			
9	2 Fast 2 Furious (2003)	$127,154,901			
10	Tokyo Drift (2006)	$62,514,415			

Hobbs & Shaw (2019)	$173,956,935

13
Toy Story
$1,923,443,778
6
$320,573,963
Toy Story 5 ($480,294,461)

	Main series	$1,805,136,590	5	$361,027,318	Toy Story 5 ($480,294,461)
1	Toy Story 5 (2026)	$480,294,461			
2	Toy Story 4 (2019)	$434,038,008			
3	Toy Story 3 (2010)	$415,004,880			
4	Toy Story 2 (1999)	$245,852,179			
5	Toy Story (1995)	$199,244,616			
6	Toy Story/Toy Story 2 (3D) (2009)	$30,702,446			

Lightyear (2022)	$118,307,188

14	Middle-earth	$1,916,894,736	8	$239,611,842	The Lord of the Rings: The Return of the King ($385,849,559)
Peter Jackson series $1,877,264,744 6 $312,877,457 The Lord of the Rings: The Return of the King ($385,849,559): / The Lord of the Rings / $1,060,774,533 / 3 / $353,591,511 / The Return of the King ($385,849,559); 1 / The Return of the King (2003) / $385,849,559; 2 / The Two Towers (2002) / $349,612,565; 3 / The Fellowship of the Ring (2001) / $325,312,409; / The Hobbit / $816,490,211 / 3 / $272,163,404 / An Unexpected Journey ($303,003,568); 1 / An Unexpected Journey (2012) / $303,003,568; 2 / The Desolation of Smaug (2013) / $258,366,855; 3 / The Battle of the Five Armies (2014) / $255,119,788
The Lord of the Rings (1978) / $30,471,420
The Lord of the Rings: The War of the Rohirrim (2024) / $9,158,572

15	Avatar	$1,878,021,160	3	$626,007,053	Avatar ($785,221,649)
1	Avatar (2009)	$785,221,649			
2	The Way of Water (2022)	$688,459,501			
3	Fire and Ash (2025)	$404,340,010			

16
Transformers
$1,802,678,694
9
$200,297,633
Revenge of the Fallen ($402,111,870)

	Main series	$1,792,672,516	8	$224,084,065	Revenge of the Fallen ($402,111,870)
1	Revenge of the Fallen (2009)	$402,111,870			
2	Dark of the Moon (2011)	$352,390,543			
3	Transformers (2007)	$319,246,193			
4	Age of Extinction (2014)	$245,439,076			
5	Rise of the Beasts (2023)	$157,066,392			
6	The Last Knight (2017)	$130,168,683			
7	Bumblebee (2018)	$127,195,589			
8	One (2024)	$59,054,170			

The Transformers: The Movie (1986)	$10,006,178

17	The Hunger Games †	$1,738,826,179	6	$289,804,363	Catching Fire ($425,316,659)
/ Main series / $1,452,475,585 / 4 / $363,118,896 / Catching Fire ($425,316,659); 1 / Catching Fire (2013) / $425,316,659; 2 / The Hunger Games (2012) / $408,010,692; 3 / Mockingjay – Part 1 (2014) / $337,135,885; 4 / Mockingjay – Part 2 (2015) / $282,012,349
The Ballad of Songbirds & Snakes (2023) / $166,350,594
Sunrise on the Reaping (2026) † / $120,000,000

18
Shrek
$1,611,414,713
6
$268,569,119
Shrek 2 ($444,978,202)

	Main series	$1,276,926,044	4	$319,231,511	Shrek 2 ($444,978,202)
1	Shrek 2 (2004)	$444,978,202			
2	Shrek the Third (2007)	$322,719,944			
3	Shrek (2001)	$270,491,111			
4	Shrek Forever After (2010)	$238,736,787			

	Puss in Boots series	$334,791,369	2	$167,395,685	The Last Wish ($185,530,865)
1	The Last Wish (2022)	$185,530,865			
2	Puss in Boots (2011)	$149,260,504			

19	Superman	$1,580,630,137	10	$158,063,014	Superman (2025) ($354,184,465)
/ DC Extended Universe / $621,405,712 / 2 / $310,702,856 / Batman v Superman: Dawn of Justice ($330,360,194); 1 / Batman v Superman: Dawn of Justice (2016) / $330,360,194; 2 / Man of Steel (2013) / $291,045,518
/ DC Universe / $426,550,997 / 2 / $213,275,499 / Superman ($354,184,465); 1 / Superman (2025) / $354,184,465; 2 / Supergirl (2026) / $72,366,532
Original series $332,592,236 5 $66,518,447 Superman ($134,478,449): / Christopher Reeve films / $318,295,798 / 4 / $79,573,950 / Superman ($134,478,449); 1 / Superman (1978) / $134,478,449; 2 / Superman II (1980) / $108,185,706; 3 / Superman III (1983) / $59,950,623; 4 / The Quest for Peace (1987) / $15,681,020; Supergirl (1984) / $14,296,438
Superman Returns (2006) / $200,081,192

20	Mission: Impossible	$1,525,069,828	8	$190,633,729	Fallout ($220,159,104)
1	Fallout (2018)	$220,159,104			
2	Mission: Impossible 2 (2000)	$215,409,889			
3	Ghost Protocol (2011)	$209,397,903			
4	The Final Reckoning (2025)	$197,413,515			
5	Rogue Nation (2015)	$195,042,377			
6	Mission: Impossible (1996)	$180,981,856			
7	Dead Reckoning (2023)	$172,635,383			
8	Mission: Impossible III (2006)	$134,029,801			

== Franchises and film series adjusted for inflation ==
This chart ranks films by gross adjusted for ticket price inflation up to 2020 levels, based on data from Box Office Mojo, and applying the Template:Inflation for the following years up to 2024 levels, due to the lack of updates on the original source.

† Background shading indicates that at least one film in the series is playing in the week commencing 20 November 2026 in theaters around the world.

Highest-grossing franchises and film series(The films in each franchise can be viewed by selecting "show")

Rank	Series	Total adjusted for inflation	No. of films	Average of films	Highest-grossing film

1
Marvel Cinematic Universe †
$17,571,120,857
38
$462,397,917
Avengers: Endgame ($1,150,627,128)

The Infinity Saga	$11,620,668,101	23	$505,246,439	Avengers: Endgame ($1,150,627,128)
/ Phase Three / $6,425,990,063 / 11 / $584,180,915 / Avengers: Endgame ($1,150,627,128); 1 / Avengers: Endgame (2019) / $1,150,627,128; 2 / Black Panther (2018) / $889,546,092; 3 / Avengers: Infinity War (2018) / $844,180,249; 4 / Captain Marvel (2019) / $552,215,302; 5 / Captain America: Civil War (2016) / $545,014,912; 6 / Guardians of the Galaxy Vol. 2 (2017) / $507,728,381; 7 / Spider-Man: Far From Home (2019) / $505,567,944; 8 / Spider-Man: Homecoming (2017) / $436,560,887; 9 / Thor: Ragnarok (2017) / $400,074,554; 10 / Doctor Strange (2016) / $308,491,925; 11 / Ant-Man and the Wasp (2018) / $285,982,689
/ Phase One / $2,616,193,272 / 6 / $436,032,212 / The Avengers ($896,186,957); 1 / The Avengers (2012) / $896,186,957; 2 / Iron Man (2008) / $517,465,286; 3 / Iron Man 2 (2010) / $462,404,503; 4 / Thor (2011) / $261,892,795; 5 / Captain America: The First Avenger (2011) / $259,384,257; 6 / The Incredible Hulk (2008) / $218,859,474
/ Phase Two / $2,578,484,766 / 6 / $429,747,461 / Avengers: Age of Ultron ($621,905,340); 1 / Avengers: Age of Ultron (2015) / $621,905,340; 2 / Iron Man 3 (2013) / $569,425,367; 3 / Guardians of the Galaxy (2014) / $480,671,837; 4 / Captain America: The Winter Soldier (2014) / $363,637,802; 5 / Thor: The Dark World (2013) / $288,399,139; 6 / Ant-Man (2015) / $254,445,281

The Multiverse Saga †	$5,950,452,756	15	$396,696,850	Spider-Man: No Way Home ($967,175,183)
/ Phase Four / $2,977,534,266 / 7 / $425,362,038 / Spider-Man: No Way Home ($967,175,183); 1 / Spider-Man: No Way Home (2021) / $967,175,183; 2 / Black Panther: Wakanda Forever (2022) / $499,294,537; 3 / Doctor Strange in the Multiverse of Madness (2022) / $452,539,606; 4 / Thor: Love and Thunder (2022) / $377,644,966; 5 / Shang-Chi and the Legend of the Ten Rings (2021) / $266,788,205; 6 / Black Widow (2021) / $218,203,336; 7 / Eternals (2021) / $195,888,433
/ Phase Five / $1,739,572,604 / 6 / $289,928,767 / Deadpool & Wolverine ($653,496,995); 1 / Deadpool & Wolverine (2024) / $653,496,995; 2 / Guardians of the Galaxy Vol. 3 (2023) / $379,345,185; 3 / Ant-Man and the Wasp: Quantumania (2023) / $226,666,049; 4 / Captain America: Brave New World (2025) / $200,500,001; 5 / Thunderbolts* (2025) / $190,274,328; 6 / The Marvels (2023) / $89,290,046
/ Phase Six † / $1,233,345,886 / 2 / $616,672,943 / Spider-Man: Brand New Day ($959,059,276); 1 / Spider-Man: Brand New Day (2026) † / $959,059,276; 2 / The Fantastic Four: First Steps (2025) / $274,286,610

2	Star Wars	$10,632,823,955	13	$817,909,535	Star Wars ($2,076,299,183)
Skywalker saga / $9,429,784,391 / 9 / $1,047,753,821 / Star Wars ($2,076,299,183); / Original trilogy / $4,325,947,575 / 3 / $1,441,982,525 / Star Wars ($2,076,299,183); 1 / IV: A New Hope (1977) / $2,076,299,183; 2 / V: The Empire Strikes Back (1980) / $1,145,547,552; 3 / VI: Return of the Jedi (1983) / $1,104,100,840 / Sequel trilogy / $2,689,147,207 / 3 / $896,382,402 / The Force Awakens ($1,260,273,545); 1 / VII: The Force Awakens (2015) / $1,260,273,545; 2 / VIII: The Last Jedi (2017) / $787,933,972; 3 / IX: The Rise of Skywalker (2019) / $640,939,690 / Prequel trilogy / $2,415,032,394 / 3 / $805,010,798 / The Phantom Menace ($1,066,120,734); 1 / I: The Phantom Menace (1999) / $1,066,120,734; 2 / III: Revenge of the Sith (2005) / $725,641,311; 3 / II: Attack of the Clones (2002) / $623,270,349
/ Anthology films / $972,387,425 / 2 / $486,193,713 / Rogue One ($706,053,398); 1 / Rogue One (2016) / $706,053,398; 2 / Solo (2018) / $266,334,027
The Mandalorian and Grogu (2026) / $177,730,060
The Clone Wars (2008) / $52,579,294

3	James Bond	$8,003,406,676	27	$296,422,469	Thunderball ($871,926,874)
Eon series / $7,578,658,307 / 25 / $303,146,332 / Thunderball ($871,926,874); / Sean Connery's Bond / $2,904,016,567 / 6 / $484,002,761 / Thunderball ($871,926,874); 1 / Thunderball (1965) / $871,926,874; 2 / Goldfinger (1964) / $772,844,275; 3 / You Only Live Twice (1967) / $418,524,900; 4 / From Russia with Love (1963) / $310,806,960; 5 / Diamonds Are Forever (1971) / $309,572,508; 6 / Dr. No (1962) / $220,341,050 / Roger Moore's Bond / $1,572,995,759 / 7 / $224,713,680 / Moonraker ($326,520,295); 1 / Moonraker (1979) / $326,520,295; 2 / Octopussy (1983) / $251,244,330; 3 / The Spy Who Loved Me (1977) / $244,837,766; 4 / Live and Let Die (1973) / $232,989,818; 5 / For Your Eyes Only (1981) / $229,834,329; 6 / A View to a Kill (1985) / $150,656,873; 7 / The Man with the Golden Gun (1974) / $136,912,348 / Daniel Craig's Bond / $1,470,167,717 / 5 / $294,033,543 / Skyfall ($441,115,732); 1 / Skyfall (2012) / $441,115,732; 2 / Casino Royale (2006) / $296,416,670; 3 / Quantum of Solace (2008) / $273,346,744; 4 / Spectre (2015) / $268,128,005; 5 / No Time to Die (2021) / $191,160,566 / Pierce Brosnan's Bond / $1,209,424,355 / 4 / $302,356,089 / Die Another Day ($321,540,520); 1 / Die Another Day (2002) / $321,540,520; 2 / Tomorrow Never Dies (1997) / $313,697,841; 3 / The World Is Not Enough (1999) / $289,715,189; 4 / GoldenEye (1995) / $284,470,805 / Timothy Dalton's Bond / $235,097,867 / 2 / $117,548,934 / The Living Daylights ($145,056,694); 1 / The Living Daylights (1987) / $145,056,694; 2 / Licence to Kill (1989) / $90,041,173 / George Lazenby's Bond / $186,956,042 / 1 / $186,956,042 / On Her Majesty's Secret Service ($186,956,042); 1 / On Her Majesty's Secret Service (1969) / $186,956,042
Casino Royale (1967) / $219,615,915
Never Say Never Again (1983) / $205,132,454

4	Spider-Man †	$7,120,386,396	17	$418,846,259	No Way Home ($967,175,183)
/ Marvel Cinematic Universe † / $2,868,363,290 / 4 / $717,090,823 / No Way Home ($967,175,183); 1 / No Way Home (2021) / $967,175,183; 2 / Brand New Day (2026) † / $959,059,276; 3 / Far From Home (2019) / $505,567,944; 4 / Homecoming (2017) / $436,560,887
/ Raimi series / $2,100,215,381 / 3 / $700,071,794 / Spider-Man ($824,964,521); 1 / Spider-Man (2002) / $824,964,521; 2 / Spider-Man 2 (2004) / $703,562,421; 3 / Spider-Man 3 (2007) / $571,688,439
/ Sony's Spider-Man Universe / $824,706,440 / 6 / $137,451,073 / Venom ($275,626,809); 1 / Venom (2018) / $275,626,809; 2 / Venom: Let There Be Carnage (2021) / $253,727,102; 3 / Venom: The Last Dance (2024) / $143,432,498; 4 / Morbius (2022) / $81,265,522; 5 / Madame Web (2024) / $44,969,821; 6 / Kraven the Hunter (2024) / $25,684,688
/ The Amazing Spider-Man series / $678,003,583 / 2 / $339,001,792 / The Amazing Spider-Man ($393,311,838); 1 / The Amazing Spider-Man (2012) / $393,311,838; 2 / The Amazing Spider-Man 2 (2014) / $284,691,745
/ Spider-Verse / $649,097,702 / 2 / $324,548,851 / Across the Spider-Verse ($403,215,489); 1 / Across the Spider-Verse (2023) / $403,215,489; 2 / Into the Spider-Verse (2018) / $245,882,213

5	Batman †	$5,602,609,033	17	$329,565,237	The Dark Knight ($868,004,369)
/ Burton/Schumacher series / $1,957,318,465 / 4 / $489,329,616 / Batman ($734,054,020); 1 / Batman (1989) / $734,054,020; 2 / Batman Forever (1995) / $493,200,540; 3 / Batman Returns (1992) / $457,463,195; 4 / Batman & Robin (1997) / $272,600,710
/ The Dark Knight trilogy / $1,914,906,451 / 3 / $638,302,150 / The Dark Knight ($868,004,369); 1 / The Dark Knight (2008) / $868,004,369; 2 / The Dark Knight Rises (2012) / $671,218,167; 3 / Batman Begins (2005) / $375,683,915
/ Joker series / $477,153,606 / 2 / $238,576,803 / Joker ($417,319,589); 1 / Joker (2019) / $417,319,589; 2 / Folie à Deux (2024) / $59,834,017
Batman v Superman: Dawn of Justice (2016) / $445,995,259
The Batman (2022) / $406,347,341
The Lego Batman Movie (2017) / $231,690,088
Catwoman (2004) / $68,526,782
Clayface (2026) † / $66,195,000
Batman: The Movie (1966) / $16,869,231
Mask of the Phantasm (1993) / $12,542,594
The Killing Joke (2016) / $5,064,216

6
Wizarding World
$4,770,462,341
11
$433,678,395
Harry Potter and the Sorcerer's Stone ($655,398,456)

	Harry Potter series	$4,151,144,317	8	$518,893,040	Sorcerer's Stone ($655,398,456)
1	Sorcerer's Stone (2001)	$655,398,456			
2	Deathly Hallows – Part 2 (2011)	$561,940,551			
3	Goblet of Fire (2005)	$529,140,713			
4	Chamber of Secrets (2002)	$526,191,549			
5	Order of the Phoenix (2007)	$497,210,472			
6	Half-Blood Prince (2009)	$474,226,806			
7	Prisoner of Azkaban (2004)	$470,994,381			
8	Deathly Hallows – Part 1 (2010)	$433,663,555			
9	IMAX Marathon (2016)	$2,377,834			

	Fantastic Beasts series	$621,695,858	3	$207,231,953	Where to Find Them ($310,261,423)
1	Where to Find Them (2016)	$310,261,423			
2	The Crimes of Grindelwald (2018)	$205,981,067			
3	The Secrets of Dumbledore (2022)	$105,453,368			

7	X-Men	$4,360,104,038	14	$311,436,003	Deadpool & Wolverine ($653,496,995)
/ Main series / $2,003,286,922 / 7 / $286,183,846 / The Last Stand ($417,085,288); 1 / The Last Stand (2006) / $417,085,288; 2 / X2 (2003) / $415,525,611; 3 / X-Men (2000) / $340,186,700; 4 / Days of Future Past (2014) / $327,940,090; 5 / First Class (2011) / $211,977,313; 6 / Apocalypse (2016) / $207,653,815; 7 / Dark Phoenix (2019) / $82,918,105
/ Deadpool series / $1,551,067,612 / 3 / $517,022,537 / Deadpool & Wolverine ($653,496,995); 1 / Deadpool & Wolverine (2024) / $653,496,995; 2 / Deadpool (2016) / $493,000,044; 3 / Deadpool 2 (2018) / $404,570,573
/ Wolverine series / $776,075,533 / 3 / $258,691,844 / Logan ($298,043,956); 1 / Logan (2017) / $298,043,956; 2 / Origins: Wolverine (2009) / $281,079,849; 3 / The Wolverine (2013) / $196,951,728
The New Mutants (2020) / $29,673,971

8
Jurassic Park
$4,213,346,730
7
$601,906,676
Jurassic Park ($1,073,227,303)

	Jurassic World series	$2,185,205,630	4	$546,301,408	Jurassic World ($895,399,211)
1	Jurassic World (2015)	$895,399,211			
2	Fallen Kingdom (2018)	$535,561,266			
3	Dominion (2022)	$414,604,753			
4	Rebirth (2025)	$339,640,400			

	Jurassic Park trilogy	$2,028,141,100	3	$676,047,033	Jurassic Park ($1,073,227,303)
1	Jurassic Park (1993)	$1,073,227,303			
2	The Lost World (1997)	$581,789,710			
3	Jurassic Park III (2001)	$373,124,087			

9	DC Extended Universe	$3,542,890,997	15	$236,192,733	Wonder Woman ($537,871,639)
1	Wonder Woman (2017)	$537,871,639			
2	Batman v Superman: Dawn of Justice (2016)	$445,995,259			
3	Suicide Squad (2016)	$445,045,232			
4	Aquaman (2018)	$433,097,036			
5	Man of Steel (2013)	$410,907,196			
6	Justice League (2017)	$290,828,411			
7	Black Adam (2022)	$184,997,916			
8	Shazam! (2019)	$181,606,748			
9	Aquaman and the Lost Kingdom (2023)	$131,537,337			
10	The Flash (2023)	$114,262,757			
11	Birds of Prey (2020)	$104,697,584			
12	Blue Beetle (2023)	$76,596,996			
13	The Suicide Squad (2021)	$66,318,751			
14	Shazam! Fury of the Gods (2023)	$60,905,167			
15	Wonder Woman 1984 (2020)	$58,222,968			

10	Avengers	$3,512,899,674	4	$878,224,919	Endgame ($1,150,627,128)
1	Endgame (2019)	$1,150,627,128			
2	The Avengers (2012)	$896,186,957			
3	Infinity War (2018)	$844,180,249			
4	Age of Ultron (2015)	$621,905,340			

11	Middle-earth	$3,384,411,718	8	$423,051,465	The Lord of the Rings: The Return of the King ($726,249,695)
Peter Jackson series $3,224,598,438 6 $537,433,073 The Lord of the Rings: The Return of the King ($726,249,695): / The Lord of the Rings / $2,053,935,195 / 3 / $684,645,065 / The Return of the King ($726,249,695); 1 / The Return of the King (2003) / $726,249,695; 2 / The Two Towers (2002) / $679,619,650; 3 / The Fellowship of the Ring (2001) / $648,065,850; / The Hobbit / $1,170,663,243 / 3 / $390,221,081 / An Unexpected Journey ($441,018,981); 1 / An Unexpected Journey (2012) / $441,018,981; 2 / The Desolation of Smaug (2013) / $367,364,474; 3 / The Battle of the Five Armies (2014) / $362,279,788
The Lord of the Rings (1978) / $150,413,770
The Lord of the Rings: The War of the Rohirrim (2024) / $9,399,510

12	Star Trek	$3,249,963,077	13	$249,997,160	Star Trek ($402,718,311)
/ The Original Series / $1,642,264,454 / 6 / $273,710,742 / The Motion Picture ($382,466,993); 1 / The Motion Picture (1979) / $382,466,993; 2 / IV: The Voyage Home (1986) / $336,531,134; 3 / II: The Wrath of Khan (1982) / $313,755,283; 4 / III: The Search for Spock (1984) / $265,298,905; 5 / VI: The Undiscovered Country (1991) / $208,606,173; 6 / V: The Final Frontier (1989) / $135,605,966
/ Kelvin Timeline / $939,502,373 / 3 / $313,167,458 / Star Trek ($402,718,311); 1 / Star Trek (2009) / $402,718,311; 2 / Into Darkness (2013) / $319,225,484; 3 / Beyond (2016) / $217,558,578
/ The Next Generation / $668,196,250 / 4 / $167,049,063 / First Contact ($241,777,862); 1 / First Contact (1996) / $241,777,862; 2 / Generations (1994) / $210,351,193; 3 / Insurrection (1998) / $138,641,403; 4 / Nemesis (2002) / $77,425,792

13	Superman	$3,072,667,222	10	$307,266,722	Superman (1978) ($668,912,456)
Original series $1,433,137,719 5 $286,627,544 Superman ($668,912,456): / Christopher Reeve films / $1,388,833,415 / 4 / $347,208,354 / Superman ($668,912,456); 1 / Superman (1978) / $668,912,456; 2 / Superman II (1980) / $453,631,613; 3 / Superman III (1983) / $221,850,603; 4 / The Quest for Peace (1987) / $44,438,743; Supergirl (1984) / $44,304,304
/ DC Extended Universe / $856,902,455 / 2 / $428,451,228 / Batman v Superman: Dawn of Justice ($445,995,259); 1 / Batman v Superman: Dawn of Justice (2016) / $445,995,259; 2 / Man of Steel (2013) / $410,907,196
/ DC Universe / $426,550,997 / 2 / $213,275,499 / Superman ($354,184,465); 1 / Superman (2025) / $354,184,465; 2 / Supergirl (2026) / $72,366,532
Superman Returns (2006) / $356,076,051

14	Indiana Jones	$2,931,374,030	5	$586,274,806	Raiders of the Lost Ark ($1,032,130,615)
1	Raiders of the Lost Ark (1981)	$1,032,130,615			
2	Temple of Doom (1984)	$624,019,879			
3	Last Crusade (1989)	$576,037,091			
4	Kingdom of the Crystal Skull (2008)	$514,815,701			
5	Dial of Destiny (2023)	$184,370,744			

15
Toy Story
$2,917,348,678
6
$486,224,780
Toy Story 3 ($621,765,459)

	Main series	$2,787,189,246	5	$557,437,849	Toy Story 3 ($621,765,459)
1	Toy Story 3 (2010)	$621,765,459			
2	Toy Story (1995)	$566,018,177			
3	Toy Story 4 (2019)	$561,491,765			
4	Toy Story 2 (1999)	$557,619,384			
5	Toy Story 5 (2026)	$480,294,461			

Lightyear (2022)	$130,159,432

16
Fast & Furious
$2,883,647,616
11
$262,149,783
Furious 7 ($478,205,263)

	The Fast Saga	$2,658,670,666	10	$265,867,067	Furious 7 ($478,205,263)
1	Furious 7 (2015)	$478,205,263			
2	Fast & Furious 6 (2013)	$332,754,339			
3	Fast Five (2011)	$303,519,144			
4	The Fast and the Furious (2001)	$302,095,342			
5	The Fate of the Furious (2017)	$294,362,746			
6	2 Fast 2 Furious (2003)	$245,806,444			
7	Fast & Furious (2009)	$242,298,920			
8	F9 (2021)	$205,554,773			
9	Fast X (2023)	$154,234,315			
10	Tokyo Drift (2006)	$99,839,380			

Hobbs & Shaw (2019)	$224,976,950

17
Shrek
$2,711,948,036
6
$451,991,339
Shrek 2 ($831,869,277)

	Main series	$2,285,697,632	4	$571,424,408	Shrek 2 ($831,869,277)
1	Shrek 2 (2004)	$831,869,277			
2	Shrek (2001)	$553,482,260			
3	Shrek the Third (2007)	$546,784,410			
4	Shrek Forever After (2010)	$353,561,685			

	Puss in Boots series	$426,250,404	2	$213,125,202	Puss in Boots ($222,132,697)
1	Puss in Boots (2011)	$222,132,697			
2	The Last Wish (2022)	$204,117,707			

18
Despicable Me
$2,706,912,542
7
$386,701,792
Despicable Me 2 ($546,634,038)

	Main series	$1,642,412,963	4	$410,603,241	Despicable Me 2 ($546,634,038)
1	Despicable Me 2 (2013)	$546,634,038			
2	Despicable Me (2010)	$379,946,798			
3	Despicable Me 4 (2024)	$370,501,292			
4	Despicable Me 3 (2017)	$345,330,835			

	Minions series	$1,064,499,579	3	$354,833,193	Minions ($474,596,325)
1	Minions (2015)	$474,596,325			
2	The Rise of Gru (2022)	$406,731,994			
3	Minions & Monsters (2026)	$183,171,260			

19
Transformers
$2,621,200,183
9
$291,244,465
Revenge of the Fallen ($628,310,739)

	Main series	$2,599,862,312	8	$324,982,789	Revenge of the Fallen ($628,310,739)
1	Revenge of the Fallen (2009)	$628,310,739			
2	Transformers (2007)	$540,898,904			
3	Dark of the Moon (2011)	$515,939,414			
4	Age of Extinction (2014)	$354,081,577			
5	The Last Knight (2017)	$170,972,306			
6	Rise of the Beasts (2023)	$165,969,566			
7	Bumblebee (2018)	$163,082,073			
8	One (2024)	$60,607,733			

The Transformers: The Movie (1986)	$21,337,871

20
Rocky
$2,620,951,302
9
$291,216,811
Rocky ($641,588,973)

	Main series	$2,158,387,662	6	$359,731,277	Rocky ($641,588,973)
1	Rocky (1976)	$641,588,973			
2	Rocky III (1982)	$495,566,866			
3	Rocky IV (1985)	$412,501,843			
4	Rocky II (1979)	$395,597,186			
5	Rocky Balboa (2006)	$112,227,034			
6	Rocky V (1990)	$100,905,760			

	Creed series	$462,563,640	3	$154,187,880	Creed III ($165,105,434)
1	Creed III (2023)	$165,105,434			
2	Creed (2015)	$149,094,672			
3	Creed II (2018)	$148,363,534			

== See also ==
- List of best-selling films in the United States
- Lists of highest-grossing films
- List of highest-grossing films in the United States by year
- List of highest-grossing animated films in the United States and Canada

== Notes ==
- Avengers
  - "Avengers - Adjusted for Ticket Price Inflation". Box Office Mojo.
- Batman
  - "Batman - Adjusted for Ticket Price Inflation". Box Office Mojo.
  - "Catwoman (2004)". Box Office Mojo.
  - "Big Rental Pictures of 1966", Variety, 4 January 1967 p 8
- DC Extended Universe
  - "DC Extended Universe - Adjusted for Ticket Price Inflation". Box Office Mojo.
- The Fast and the Furious
  - "The Fast and the Furious - Adjusted for Ticket Price Inflation". Box Office Mojo.
- Indiana Jones
  - "Indiana Jones - Adjusted for Ticket Price Inflation". Box Office Mojo.
  - "Raiders of the Lost Ark (1981)". Box Office Mojo.
- James Bond
  - "James Bond - Adjusted for Ticket Price Inflation". Box Office Mojo.
  - "Casino Royale (1967)". The Numbers. Nash Information Services.
- Jurassic Park
  - "Jurassic Park - Adjusted for Ticket Price Inflation". Box Office Mojo.
  - "Jurassic Park (1993)". Box Office Mojo.
- Marvel Cinematic Universe
  - "Marvel Cinematic Universe - Adjusted for Ticket Price Inflation". Box Office Mojo.
- Middle-earth
  - "Middle Earth - Adjusted for Ticket Price Inflation". Box Office Mojo.
  - "The Lord of the Rings - Adjusted for Ticket Price Inflation". Box Office Mojo.
  - "The Lord of the Rings: The Fellowship of the Ring (2001)". Box Office Mojo.
  - "The Lord of the Rings: The Two Towers (2002)". Box Office Mojo.
  - "The Lord of the Rings: The Return of the King (2003)". Box Office Mojo.
- Pirates of the Caribbean
  - "Pirates of the Caribbean - Adjusted for Ticket Price Inflation". Box Office Mojo.
- Rocky
  - "Rocky - Adjusted for Ticket Price Inflation". Box Office Mojo.
- Shrek
  - "Shrek - Adjusted for Ticket Price Inflation". Box Office Mojo.
- Spider-Man
  - "Spider-Man - Adjusted for Ticket Price Inflation". Box Office Mojo.
  - "Venom (2018)". Box Office Mojo.
- Star Trek
  - "Star Trek - Adjusted for Ticket Price Inflation". Box Office Mojo.
- Star Wars
  - "Star Wars - Adjusted for Ticket Price Inflation". Box Office Mojo.
- Superman
  - "Superman - Adjusted for Ticket Price Inflation". Box Office Mojo.
  - "Supergirl (1984)". Box Office Mojo.
- Toy Story
  - "Toy Story - Adjusted for Ticket Price Inflation". Box Office Mojo.
- Transformers
- Wizarding World
- X-Men
