= List of highest-grossing films in the United States by year =

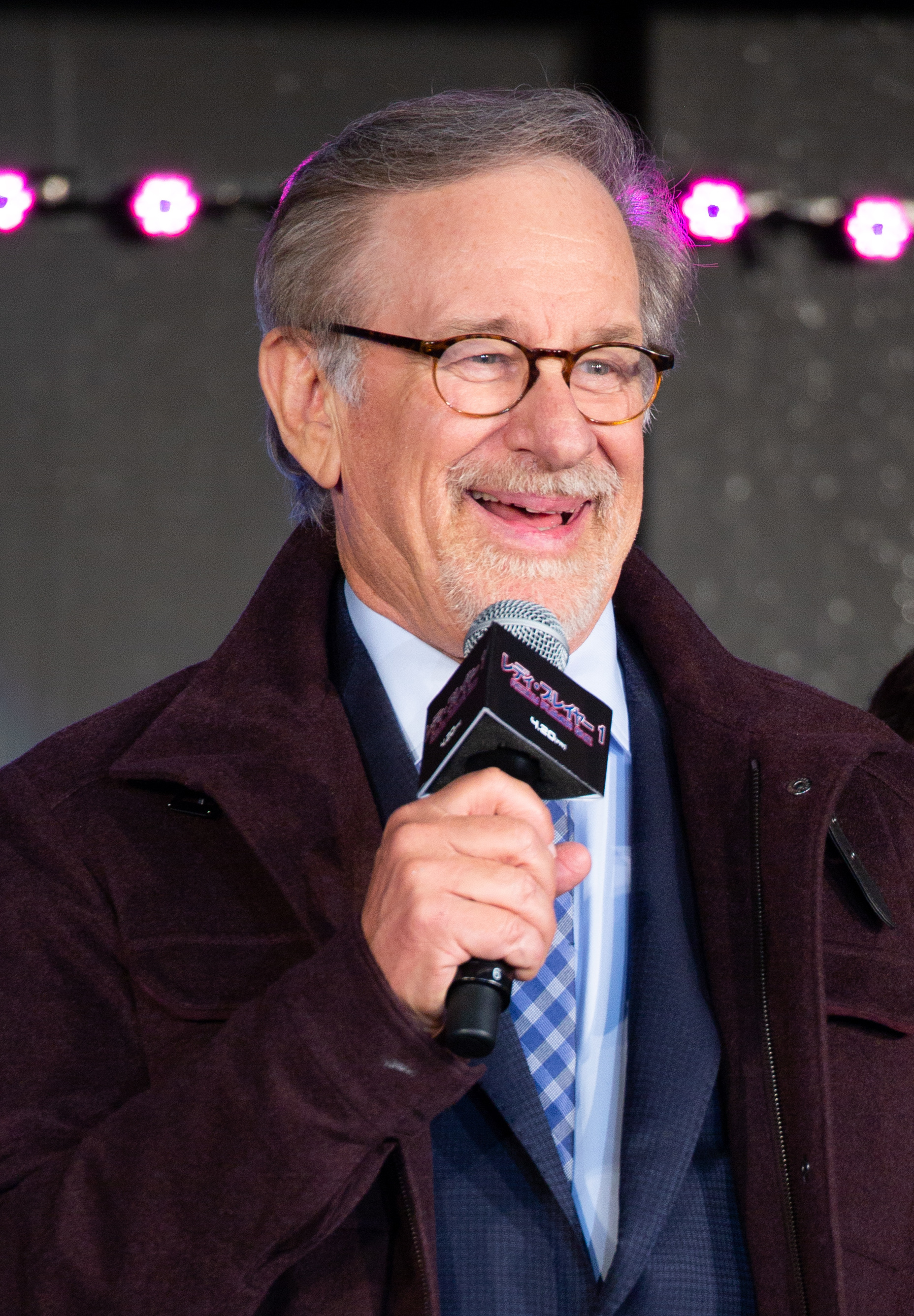
Steven Spielberg has directed a record four films to end the year as the highest-grossing in the U.S.

This is a listing of the highest-grossing films by year, based on their United States box-office gross. The films are listed by in-year release, rather than the gross they accumulated during a calendar year.

Six directors have directed the highest-grossing film on multiple occasions: George Lucas, Steven Spielberg, James Cameron, Sam Raimi, Robert Zemeckis, and Chris Columbus. Spielberg has the record, directing four of the yearly highest-grossing films: Raiders of the Lost Ark (1981), E.T. the Extra-Terrestrial (1982), Jurassic Park (1993), and Saving Private Ryan (1998). Lucas has directed three such films, all of which are part of the Star Wars franchise, which he created: the original Star Wars (1977), and two of its prequels The Phantom Menace (1999), and Revenge of the Sith (2005). James Cameron has also directed three such films: Terminator 2: Judgment Day (1991), Titanic (1997), and Avatar (2009). Sam Raimi, Robert Zemeckis, and Chris Columbus have directed two each: Spider-Man (2002) and Spider-Man 3 (2007) for Raimi; Back to the Future (1985) and Forrest Gump (1994) for Zemeckis; Home Alone (1990) and Harry Potter and the Sorcerer's Stone (2001) for Columbus.

Films that are a part of larger film or media franchises are frequently atop the highest-grossing films in the United States. The Star Wars franchise has had the highest-grossing film in eight years since 1977. In addition to the aforementioned three which Lucas directed, the franchise also had The Force Awakens, Rogue One, and The Last Jedi finish as the highest-grossing in 2015, 2016, and 2017, respectively. The Marvel Cinematic Universe has had four films atop the yearly U.S. box office: The Avengers (2012), Black Panther (2018), Avengers: Endgame (2019), and Spider-Man: No Way Home (2021). No Way Home also gave the Spider-Man film franchise its third leading film. Batman films, Harry Potter, Top Gun, and Toy Story are the other franchises with two films to top the U.S. box office in a single year.

== By in-year release ==
The following is the annual listing:

Denotes current record
Denotes former record
Denotes film is currently in release and gross is estimated

Year	Film	Gross	Ref.
1977	Star Wars	$221,280,994	
1978	Grease	$159,978,870	
1979	Kramer vs. Kramer	$106,260,000	
1980	The Empire Strikes Back	$209,398,025	
1981	Raiders of the Lost Ark	$212,222,025	
1982	E.T. the Extra-Terrestrial	$359,197,037	
1983	Return of the Jedi	$252,583,617	
1984	Ghostbusters	$234,760,478	
1985	Back to the Future	$210,609,762	
1986	Top Gun	$176,781,728	
1987	Three Men and a Baby	$167,780,960	
1988	Rain Man	$172,825,435	
1989	Batman	$251,188,924	
1990	Home Alone	$285,761,243	
1991	Terminator 2: Judgment Day	$204,843,345	
1992	Aladdin	$217,350,219	
1993	Jurassic Park	$357,067,947	
1994	Forrest Gump	$329,694,499	
1995	Toy Story	$191,796,233	
1996	Independence Day	$306,169,268	
1997	Titanic	$600,788,188	
1998	Saving Private Ryan	$216,540,909	
1999	Star Wars: Episode I – The Phantom Menace	$431,088,295	
2000	How the Grinch Stole Christmas	$260,044,825	
2001	Harry Potter and the Philosopher's Stone	$317,575,550	
2002	Spider-Man	$403,706,375	
2003	The Lord of the Rings: The Return of the King	$377,027,325	
2004	Shrek 2	$441,226,247	
2005	Star Wars: Episode III – Revenge of the Sith	$380,270,577	
2006	Pirates of the Caribbean: Dead Man's Chest	$423,315,812	
2007	Spider-Man 3	$336,530,303	
2008	The Dark Knight	$533,345,358	
2009	Avatar	$749,766,139	
2010	Toy Story 3	$415,004,880	
2011	Harry Potter and the Deathly Hallows – Part 2	$381,011,219	
2012	The Avengers	$623,357,910	
2013	The Hunger Games: Catching Fire	$424,668,047	
2014	American Sniper	$350,126,372	
2015	Star Wars: Episode VII – The Force Awakens	$936,662,225	
2016	Rogue One: A Star Wars Story	$532,177,324	
2017	Star Wars: Episode VIII – The Last Jedi	$620,181,382	
2018	Black Panther	$700,059,566	
2019	Avengers: Endgame	$858,373,000	
2020	Bad Boys For Life	$206,305,244	
2021	Spider-Man: No Way Home	$804,793,477	
2022	Top Gun: Maverick	$718,732,821	
2023	Barbie	$636,238,421	
2024	Inside Out 2	$652,980,194	
2025	Zootopia 2	$428,130,160	
2026	Spider-Man: Brand New Day	$958,886,996	

== See also ==
- List of highest-grossing films in the United States and Canada
