= I Married a Mobster =

American TV documentary series (2011–2012)

- Cheryl Caruso, Andrea Giovino, Linda Schiro, Love Majewski, Linda Scarpa and Angela Calvacante (from left)
- Genre: Documentary
- Presented by: Lorraine Bracco; Margaret Rose Champagne
- Country of origin: United States
- No. of seasons: 2
- No. of episodes: 22

Production
- Executive producers: Andrea Eisen; Beth Fraikorn; Dan Pearson; Kevin Kaufman; Pamela Deutsch; Ryan Ingrasin
- Running time: 40 to 44 minutes
- Production company: Kaufman Films

Original release
- Network: Investigation Discovery
- Release: July 13, 2011 – October 10, 2012

I Married a Mobster is an American television documentary series on Investigation Discovery. The series debuted on July 13, 2011, and ended its run, after two seasons, on October 10, 2012.

== Premise ==
The series tells the stories of the wives who were married to mobsters. Each episode includes reenactments, archival photos and interviews that depict the rise and demise of mob families from the first-person point of view.

== Episodes ==
Season	Episodes	Season premiere	Season finale
1	10	July 13, 2011	September 14, 2011
2	12	August 15, 2012	October 10, 2012

=== Season 1 (2011) ===
No. overall	No. in season	Title	Original release date
1	1	"Cheryl and Philly: A Love Story"	July 13, 2011
2	2	"Working Mom"	July 20, 2011
3	3	"The Grim Reaper"	July 27, 2011
4	4	"Meet the Famas"	August 3, 2011
5	5	"Rat Trap"	August 10, 2011
6	6	"Daddy's Little Girl"	August 17, 2011
7	7	"No Way Out"	August 24, 2011
8	8	"Family Getaway"	August 31, 2011
9	9	"Love Hurts"	September 7, 2011
10	10	"Ebony & Ivory"	September 14, 2011

=== Season 2 (2012) ===
No. overall	No. in season	Title	Original release date
11	1	"Breaking Bulger"	August 15, 2012
12	2	"Scarred for Life"	August 15, 2012
13	3	"The Rule Breaker"	August 22, 2012
14	4	"It's Me or the Mob"	August 22, 2012
15	5	"Stunt Lady"	August 29, 2012
16	6	"No Way Out"	August 29, 2012
17	7	"Street Smart"	September 5, 2012
18	8	"Jekyll and Hyde"	September 12, 2012
19	9	"Vegas Rag Doll"	September 19, 2012
20	10	"Locked Up Love"	September 26, 2012
21	11	"The Outsiders"	October 3, 2012
22	12	"Mama Bear"	October 10, 2012
