= List of American films of 2016 =

This is a list of American films released in 2016.

== Box office ==
The highest-grossing American films released in 2016, by domestic box office gross revenue, are as follows:

Highest-grossing films of 2016
Rank	Title	Distributor	Domestic Gross
1	Rogue One: A Star Wars Story	Disney	$532,177,324
2	Finding Dory	Disney	$486,295,561
3	Captain America: Civil War	Disney	$408,084,349
4	The Secret Life of Pets	Universal	$368,384,330
5	The Jungle Book	Disney	$364,001,123
6	Deadpool	20th Century Fox	$363,070,709
7	Zootopia	Disney	$341,268,248
8	Batman v Superman: Dawn of Justice	Warner Bros.	$330,360,194
9	Suicide Squad	Warner Bros.	$325,100,054
10	Sing	Universal	$270,395,425

== January–March ==
Opening		Title	Production company	Cast and crew	Ref.
J A N U A R Y	8	The Forest	Gramercy Pictures / Focus Features	Jason Zada (director); Ben Ketai, Sarah Cornwell, Nick Antosca (screenplay); Natalie Dormer, Taylor Kinney, Yukiyoshi Ozawa, Eoin Macken	
J A N U A R Y	8	Anesthesia	IFC Films	Tim Blake Nelson (director/screenplay); Glenn Close, K. Todd Freeman, Jessica Hecht, Gretchen Mol, Tim Blake Nelson, Gloria Reuben, Kristen Stewart, Corey Stoll, Mickey Sumner, Yul Vazquez, Sam Waterston, Michael K. Williams	
J A N U A R Y	8	Lamb	The Orchard	Ross Partridge (director/screenplay); Ross Partridge, Oona Laurence, Jess Weixler, Tom Bower	
J A N U A R Y	15	Ride Along 2	Universal Pictures	Tim Story (director); Phil Hay, Matt Manfredi (screenplay); Ice Cube, Kevin Hart, Ken Jeong, Benjamin Bratt, Olivia Munn, Bruce McGill, Tika Sumpter	
J A N U A R Y	15	13 Hours: The Secret Soldiers of Benghazi	Paramount Pictures	Michael Bay (director); Chuck Hogan (screenplay); James Badge Dale, John Krasinski, Max Martini	
J A N U A R Y	15	Norm of the North	Lionsgate / Splash Entertainment	Trevor Wall (director); Daniel R. Altiere, Steven M. Altiere, Malcolm T. Goldman (screenplay); Rob Schneider, Heather Graham, Ken Jeong, Colm Meaney, Loretta Devine, Gabriel Iglesias, Michael McElhatton, Bill Nighy	
J A N U A R Y	15	The Benefactor	Samuel Goldwyn Films	Andrew Renzi (director/screenplay); Richard Gere, Dakota Fanning, Theo James, Clarke Peters, Brian Anthony Wilson, Dylan Baker, Cheryl Hines, Tibor Feldman	
J A N U A R Y	22	Dirty Grandpa	Lionsgate / QED International	Dan Mazer (director); John M. Phillips (screenplay); Robert De Niro, Zac Efron, Aubrey Plaza, Zoey Deutch, Julianne Hough, Dermot Mulroney	
J A N U A R Y	22	The 5th Wave	Columbia Pictures / GK Films	J Blakeson (director); Susannah Grant, Akiva Goldsman, Jeff Pinkner (screenplay); Chloë Grace Moretz, Nick Robinson, Ron Livingston, Maggie Siff, Alex Roe, Maria Bello, Maika Monroe, Liev Schreiber	
J A N U A R Y	22	The Boy	STXfilms	William Brent Bell (director); Stacey Menear (screenplay); James Russell, Lauren Cohan, Rupert Evans, Jim Norton, Diana Hardcastle	
J A N U A R Y	22	Synchronicity	POPfilms / Soapbox Films	Jacob Gentry (director/screenplay); Chad McKnight, A. J. Bowen, Brianne Davis, Scott Poythress, Michael Ironside	
J A N U A R Y	29	Kung Fu Panda 3	20th Century Fox / DreamWorks Animation	Jennifer Yuh Nelson, Alessandro Carloni (directors); Jonathan Aibel, Glenn Berger (screenplay); Jack Black, Bryan Cranston, Dustin Hoffman, Angelina Jolie, J. K. Simmons, Seth Rogen, Lucy Liu, David Cross, Kate Hudson, James Hong, Randall Duk Kim, Jackie Chan	
J A N U A R Y	29	The Finest Hours	Walt Disney Pictures	Craig Gillespie (director); Scott Silver, Paul Tamasy, Eric Johnson (screenplay); Chris Pine, Casey Affleck, Ben Foster, Holliday Grainger, John Ortiz, Eric Bana	
J A N U A R Y	29	Fifty Shades of Black	Open Road Films	Michael Tiddes (director); Marlon Wayans, Rick Alvarez (screenplay); Marlon Wayans, Kali Hawk, Affion Crockett, Jane Seymour, Andrew Bachelor, Florence Henderson, Jenny Zigrino, Fred Willard, Mike Epps	
J A N U A R Y	29	Jane Got a Gun	The Weinstein Company	Gavin O'Connor (director); Brian Duffield, Anthony Tambakis, Joel Edgerton (screenplay); Natalie Portman, Joel Edgerton, Noah Emmerich, Rodrigo Santoro, Boyd Holbrook, Ewan McGregor	
F E B R U A R Y	5	Hail, Caesar!	Universal Pictures / Working Title Films / Mike Zoss Productions	Coen brothers (directors/screenplay); Josh Brolin, George Clooney, Alden Ehrenreich, Ralph Fiennes, Jonah Hill, Scarlett Johansson, Frances McDormand, Tilda Swinton, Channing Tatum	
F E B R U A R Y	5	Pride and Prejudice and Zombies	Screen Gems / Cross Creek Pictures	Burr Steers (director/screenplay); Lily James, Sam Riley, Jack Huston, Bella Heathcote, Douglas Booth, Matt Smith, Charles Dance, Lena Headey	
F E B R U A R Y	5	The Choice	Lionsgate	Ross Katz (director); Bryan Sipe (screenplay); Benjamin Walker, Teresa Palmer, Maggie Grace, Alexandra Daddario, Tom Welling, Tom Wilkinson	
F E B R U A R Y	12	Deadpool	20th Century Fox / Marvel Entertainment	Tim Miller (director); Rhett Reese, Paul Wernick (screenplay); Ryan Reynolds, Morena Baccarin, Ed Skrein, T.J. Miller, Gina Carano, Brianna Hildebrand	
F E B R U A R Y	12	Zoolander 2	Paramount Pictures / Red Hour Films	Ben Stiller (director/screenplay); Justin Theroux, Nicholas Stoller, John Hamburg (screenplay); Ben Stiller, Owen Wilson, Will Ferrell, Penélope Cruz, Kristen Wiig, Fred Armisen	
F E B R U A R Y	12	How to Be Single	Warner Bros. Pictures / New Line Cinema / Metro-Goldwyn-Mayer / RatPac-Dune Entertainment	Christian Ditter (director); Abby Kohn, Marc Silverstein, Dana Fox (screenplay); Dakota Johnson, Rebel Wilson, Damon Wayans Jr., Anders Holm, Alison Brie, Nicholas Braun, Jake Lacy, Jason Mantzoukas, Leslie Mann	
F E B R U A R Y	19	Risen	Columbia Pictures	Kevin Reynolds (director/screenplay); Paul Aiello (screenplay); Joseph Fiennes, Tom Felton, Peter Firth, Cliff Curtis	
F E B R U A R Y	19	The Witch	A24	Robert Eggers (director/screenplay); Anya Taylor-Joy, Ralph Ineson, Kate Dickie, Harvey Scrimshaw, Ellie Grainger, Lucas Dawson	
F E B R U A R Y	26	Crouching Tiger, Hidden Dragon: Sword of Destiny	The Weinstein Company / China Film Group / Yucaipa Companies / Netflix	Yuen Woo-ping (director); John Fusco (screenplay); Donnie Yen, Michelle Yeoh	
F E B R U A R Y	26	Gods of Egypt	Summit Entertainment / Thunder Road Films	Alex Proyas (director); Matt Sazama, Burk Sharpless (screenplay); Nikolaj Coster-Waldau, Gerard Butler, Brenton Thwaites, Chadwick Boseman, Élodie Yung, Courtney Eaton, Rufus Sewell, Geoffrey Rush	
F E B R U A R Y	26	Triple 9	Open Road Films	John Hillcoat (director); Matt Cook (screenplay); Casey Affleck, Chiwetel Ejiofor, Anthony Mackie, Aaron Paul, Clifton Collins Jr., Norman Reedus, Teresa Palmer, Michael K. Williams, Gal Gadot, Woody Harrelson, Kate Winslet	
F E B R U A R Y	26	Eddie the Eagle	20th Century Fox	Dexter Fletcher (director); Sean Macaulay, Simon Kelton (screenplay); Taron Egerton, Hugh Jackman, Christopher Walken, Iris Berben, Jim Broadbent	
M A R C H	4	Zootopia	Walt Disney Pictures / Walt Disney Animation Studios	Byron Howard, Rich Moore (directors); Jared Bush, Phil Johnston (screenplay); Ginnifer Goodwin, Jason Bateman, Idris Elba, Jenny Slate, Nate Torrence, Bonnie Hunt, Don Lake, Tommy Chong, J. K. Simmons, Octavia Spencer, Alan Tudyk, Shakira	
M A R C H	4	London Has Fallen	Focus Features / Millennium Films	Babak Najafi (director); Creighton Rothenberger, Katrin Benedikt, Christian Gudegast, Chad St. John (screenplay); Gerard Butler, Aaron Eckhart, Morgan Freeman, Alon Abutbul, Angela Bassett, Robert Forster, Jackie Earle Haley, Melissa Leo, Radha Mitchell, Sean O'Bryan, Waleed Zuaiter	
M A R C H	4	Whiskey Tango Foxtrot	Paramount Pictures	Glenn Ficarra, John Requa (directors); Robert Carlock (screenplay); Tina Fey, Margot Robbie, Martin Freeman, Alfred Molina, Billy Bob Thornton	
M A R C H	4	The Other Side of the Door	20th Century Fox	Johannes Roberts (director/screenplay); Ernest Riera (screenplay); Sarah Wayne Callies, Jeremy Sisto	
M A R C H	8	Open Season: Scared Silly	Sony Pictures Home Entertainment / Sony Pictures Animation	David Feiss (director); Carlos Kotkin (screenplay); Will Townsend, Donny Lucas, Melissa Sturm, Trevor Devall, Garry Chalk, Kathleen Barr	
M A R C H	11	10 Cloverfield Lane	Paramount Pictures / Bad Robot	Dan Trachtenberg (director); Josh Campbell, Matt Stuecken, Damien Chazelle (screenplay); Mary Elizabeth Winstead, John Goodman, John Gallagher Jr.	
M A R C H	11	The Brothers Grimsby	Columbia Pictures / Village Roadshow Pictures / Four By Two Films	Louis Leterrier (director); Sacha Baron Cohen, Phil Johnston, Peter Baynham (screenplay); Sacha Baron Cohen, Mark Strong, Isla Fisher, Rebel Wilson, Gabourey Sidibe, Penélope Cruz	
M A R C H	11	The Young Messiah	Focus Features	Cyrus Nowrasteh (director/screenplay); Betsy Giffen Nowrasteh (screenplay); Adam Greaves-Neal, Sean Bean, David Bradley, Lee Boardman, Jonathan Bailey, David Burke	
M A R C H	11	The Perfect Match	Lionsgate / Codeblack Films	Bille Woodruff (director); Brandon Broussard, Gary Hardwick, Dana Verde (screenplay); Terrence J, Cassie Ventura, Donald Faison, Dascha Polanco, Robert Christopher Riley, Lauren London, Joe Pantoliano, Paula Patton	
M A R C H	11	Hello, My Name Is Doris	Roadside Attractions / Stage 6 Films	Michael Showalter (director/screenplay); Laura Terruso (screenplay); Sally Field, Max Greenfield, Beth Behrs, Wendi McLendon-Covey, Stephen Root, Elizabeth Reaser, Natasha Lyonne, Tyne Daly	
M A R C H	16	Miracles from Heaven	Columbia Pictures	Patricia Riggen (director); Randy Brown (screenplay); Jennifer Garner, Kylie Rogers, Martin Henderson, John Carroll Lynch, Eugenio Derbez, Queen Latifah	
M A R C H	18	The Divergent Series: Allegiant	Summit Entertainment / Red Wagon Entertainment	Robert Schwentke (director); Noah Oppenheim, Adam Cooper, Bill Collage (screenplay); Shailene Woodley, Theo James, Jeff Daniels, Miles Teller, Ansel Elgort, Zoë Kravitz, Maggie Q, Ray Stevenson, Bill Skarsgård, Octavia Spencer, Naomi Watts	
M A R C H	18	The Bronze	Sony Pictures Classics	Bryan Buckley (director); Melissa Rauch, Winston Rauch (screenplay); Melissa Rauch, Gary Cole, Thomas Middleditch, Sebastian Stan, Cecily Strong, Haley Lu Richardson	
M A R C H	18	Midnight Special	Warner Bros. Pictures / RatPac-Dune Entertainment	Jeff Nichols (director/screenplay); Michael Shannon, Joel Edgerton, Kirsten Dunst, Adam Driver, Jaeden Martell, Sam Shepard	
M A R C H	18	Take Me to the River	Film Movement	Matt Sobel (director/screenplay); Logan Miller, Richard Schiff, Josh Hamilton, Robin Weigert, Ursula Parker	
M A R C H	25	Batman v Superman: Dawn of Justice	Warner Bros. Pictures / RatPac-Dune Entertainment / DC Entertainment / Atlas Entertainment / Cruel and Unusual Films	Zack Snyder (director); Chris Terrio, David S. Goyer (screenplay); Ben Affleck, Henry Cavill, Amy Adams, Jesse Eisenberg, Diane Lane, Laurence Fishburne, Jeremy Irons, Holly Hunter, Gal Gadot	
M A R C H	25	My Big Fat Greek Wedding 2	Universal Pictures / Gold Circle Films / Playtone	Kirk Jones (director); Nia Vardalos (screenplay); Nia Vardalos, John Corbett, Lainie Kazan, Gia Carides, Joey Fatone, Louis Mandylor, Andrea Martin, Michael Constantine	
M A R C H	25	I Saw the Light	Sony Pictures Classics / RatPac Entertainment / Creative Wealth Media Finance / Bron Studios	Marc Abraham (director/screenplay); Tom Hiddleston, Elizabeth Olsen, Cherry Jones, Bradley Whitford, Maddie Hasson, Wrenn Schmidt	
M A R C H	30	Everybody Wants Some!!	Paramount Pictures / Annapurna Pictures	Richard Linklater (director/screenplay); Will Brittain, Zoey Deutch, Ryan Guzman, Tyler Hoechlin, Blake Jenner, J. Quinton Johnson, Glen Powell, Wyatt Russell, Austin Amelio, Temple Baker, Tanner Kalina, Juston Street, Forrest Vickery	

== April–June ==
Opening		Title	Production company	Cast and crew	Ref.
A P R I L	1	God's Not Dead 2	Pure Flix	Harold Cronk (director); Chuck Konzelman, Cary Solomon (screenplay); Melissa Joan Hart, Jesse Metcalfe, David A. R. White, Ernie Hudson, Hayley Orrantia, Robin Givens, Fred Thompson, Maria Canals-Barrera, Sadie Robertson, Pat Boone, Ray Wise	
A P R I L	1	Meet the Blacks	Freestyle Releasing	Deon Taylor (director/screenplay); Nicole DeMasi (screenplay); Mike Epps, Gary Owen, Zulay Henao, Bresha Webb, Lil Duval, King Bach, Charlie Murphy, George Lopez, Mike Tyson	
A P R I L	1	Miles Ahead	Sony Pictures Classics	Don Cheadle (director/screenplay); Steven Baigelman (screenplay); Don Cheadle, Ewan McGregor, Emayatzy Corinealdi, LaKeith Stanfield, Michael Stuhlbarg	
A P R I L	1	Pandemic	XLrator Media	John Suits (director); Dustin T. Benson (screenplay); Rachel Nichols, Alfie Allen, Paul Guilfoyle, Pat Healy, Danielle Rose Russell, Missi Pyle, Mekhi Phifer	
A P R I L	8	The Boss	Universal Pictures / Gary Sanchez Productions / On The Day Productions	Ben Falcone (director/screenplay); Melissa McCarthy, Steve Mallory (screenplay); Melissa McCarthy, Kristen Bell, Kathy Bates, Tyler Labine, Peter Dinklage	
A P R I L	8	Hardcore Henry	STXfilms	Ilya Naishuller (director/screenplay); Sharlto Copley, Danila Kozlovsky, Haley Bennett, Svetlana Ustinova, Tim Roth	
A P R I L	8	Demolition	Fox Searchlight Pictures	Jean-Marc Vallée (director); Bryan Sipe (screenplay); Jake Gyllenhaal, Naomi Watts, Chris Cooper, Judah Lewis	
A P R I L	8	The Invitation	Drafthouse Films	Karyn Kusama (director); Phil Hay, Matt Manfredi (screenplay); Logan Marshall-Green, Tammy Blanchard, Michiel Huisman, Emayatzy Corinealdi, Lindsay Burdge, Michelle Krusiec, Mike Doyle, Jay Larson, John Carroll Lynch	
A P R I L	8	Hush	Netflix	Mike Flanagan (director/screenplay); Kate Siegel (screenplay); John Gallagher Jr., Michael Trucco, Kate Siegel	
A P R I L	15	The Jungle Book	Walt Disney Pictures / Fairview Entertainment	Jon Favreau (director); Justin Marks (screenplay); Neel Sethi, Bill Murray, Ben Kingsley, Idris Elba, Lupita Nyong'o, Scarlett Johansson, Giancarlo Esposito, Christopher Walken	
A P R I L	15	Barbershop: The Next Cut	Warner Bros. Pictures / New Line Cinema / Metro-Goldwyn-Mayer	Malcolm D. Lee (director); Kenya Barris, Tracy Oliver (screenplay); Ice Cube, Cedric the Entertainer, Regina Hall, Anthony Anderson, Eve, J. B. Smoove, Lamorne Morris, Sean Patrick Thomas, Tyga, Deon Cole, Common, Nicki Minaj	
A P R I L	15	Criminal	Summit Entertainment / Millennium Films	Ariel Vromen (director); Douglas S. Cook, David Weisberg (screenplay); Kevin Costner, Gary Oldman, Tommy Lee Jones, Alice Eve, Gal Gadot, Michael Pitt, Jordi Mollà, Antje Traue, Scott Adkins, Ryan Reynolds, Amaury Nolasco	
A P R I L	15	Green Room	A24	Jeremy Saulnier (director/screenplay); Anton Yelchin, Imogen Poots, Alia Shawkat, Joe Cole, Callum Turner, Patrick Stewart	
A P R I L	16	Confirmation	HBO Films / Groundswell Productions / ABC Signature	Rick Famuyiwa (director); Susannah Grant (screenplay); Kerry Washington, Wendell Pierce, Greg Kinnear, Jeffrey Wright, Eric Stonestreet, Bill Irwin, Zoe Lister-Jones, Grace Gummer, Treat Williams, Dylan Baker, Erika Christensen, Jennifer Hudson, Alison Wright, Malcolm Gets, Peter McRobbie, Kimberly Elise, Tom Virtue, Rhoda Griffis, Donna Biscoe, Michael Crider, Carol Sutton, Walt Elder, Ed Amatrudo, Jan Radcliff, Frank Hoyt Taylor, Matthew Hennessy, Michael G. Starr	
A P R I L	22	The Huntsman: Winter's War	Universal Pictures / Perfect World Pictures / Roth Films	Cedric Nicolas-Troyan (director); Evan Spiliotopoulos, Craig Mazin (screenplay); Chris Hemsworth, Charlize Theron, Emily Blunt, Nick Frost, Sam Claflin, Rob Brydon, Jessica Chastain	
A P R I L	22	A Hologram for the King	Lionsgate / Roadside Attractions / Saban Films	Tom Tykwer (director/screenplay); Tom Hanks, Omar Elba, Sarita Choudhury, Sidse Babett Knudsen, Ben Whishaw, Tom Skerritt	
A P R I L	22	Elvis & Nixon	Amazon Studios / Bleecker Street	Liza Johnson (director); Joey Sagal, Hanala Sagal, Cary Elwes (screenplay); Michael Shannon, Kevin Spacey, Alex Pettyfer, Johnny Knoxville, Colin Hanks, Evan Peters, Sky Ferreira, Tracy Letts, Tate Donovan, Ashley Benson	
A P R I L	29	Keanu	Warner Bros. Pictures / New Line Cinema / RatPac-Dune Entertainment	Peter Atencio (director); Jordan Peele, Alex Rubens (screenplay); Jordan Peele, Keegan-Michael Key, Method Man, Luis Guzmán, Nia Long, Will Forte	
A P R I L	29	Mother's Day	Open Road Films	Garry Marshall (director); Tom Hines, Anya Kochoff Romano, Matt Walker (screenplay); Jennifer Aniston, Kate Hudson, Shay Mitchell, Julia Roberts, Jason Sudeikis, Britt Robertson, Timothy Olyphant, Héctor Elizondo, Jack Whitehall	
A P R I L	29	Ratchet & Clank	Gramercy Pictures / PlayStation Originals / Rainmaker Entertainment / Blockade Entertainment	Kevin Munroe (director); T.J. Fixman, Kevin Munroe, Gerry Swallow (screenplay); Paul Giamatti, John Goodman, Bella Thorne, Rosario Dawson, Jim Ward, Armin Shimerman, Vincent Tong, Andrew Cownden, James Arnold Taylor, David Kaye, Sylvester Stallone	
M A Y	6	Captain America: Civil War	Marvel Studios	Russo brothers (directors); Christopher Markus, Stephen McFeely (screenplay); Chris Evans, Robert Downey Jr., Scarlett Johansson, Sebastian Stan, Anthony Mackie, Don Cheadle, Jeremy Renner, Chadwick Boseman, Paul Bettany, Elizabeth Olsen, Paul Rudd, Emily VanCamp, Marisa Tomei, Tom Holland, Frank Grillo, Martin Freeman, William Hurt, Daniel Brühl	
M A Y	13	Money Monster	TriStar Pictures	Jodie Foster (director); Jamie Linden, Alan Di Fiore, Jim Kouf (screenplay); George Clooney, Julia Roberts, Jack O'Connell, Dominic West, Caitríona Balfe, Giancarlo Esposito	
M A Y	13	Sundown	Pantelion Films	Fernando Lebrija (director/screenplay); Miguel Tejada-Flores (screenplay); Devon Werkheiser, Sean Marquette, Camilla Belle	
M A Y	13	The Darkness	Universal Pictures / Blumhouse Productions	Greg McLean (director/screenplay); Shayne Armstrong, S.P. Krause (screenplay); Kevin Bacon, Radha Mitchell, Jennifer Morrison, Lucy Fry, David Mazouz, Ming-Na Wen, Paul Reiser	
M A Y	20	The Angry Birds Movie	Columbia Pictures / Rovio Animation	Clay Kaytis, Fergal Reilly (directors); Jon Vitti (screenplay); Jason Sudeikis, Josh Gad, Danny McBride, Maya Rudolph, Kate McKinnon, Sean Penn, Tony Hale, Keegan-Michael Key, Bill Hader, Peter Dinklage	
M A Y	20	Neighbors 2: Sorority Rising	Universal Pictures	Nicholas Stoller (director/screenplay); Andrew J. Cohen, Brendan O'Brien, Evan Goldberg, Seth Rogen (screenplay); Seth Rogen, Zac Efron, Rose Byrne, Chloë Grace Moretz, Dave Franco, Ike Barinholtz	
M A Y	20	The Nice Guys	Warner Bros. Pictures / Silver Pictures / Waypoint Entertainment	Shane Black (director/screenplay); Anthony Bagarozzi (screenplay); Russell Crowe, Ryan Gosling, Angourie Rice, Matt Bomer, Margaret Qualley, Keith David, Kim Basinger	
M A Y	21	All the Way	HBO Films / Amblin Television / Moon Shot Entertainment / Tale Told Productions / Everyman Pictures	Jay Roach (director); Robert Schenkkan (screenplay); Bryan Cranston, Anthony Mackie, Melissa Leo, Frank Langella, Bradley Whitford, Stephen Root, Marque Richardson, Aisha Hinds, Mo McRae, Spencer Garrett, Ken Jenkins, Jeff Doucette, Randy Oglesby, Joe O'Connor, Hal Landon Jr., Ray Wise, Dohn Norwood, Joe Morton, Toby Huss, Matthew Glave, Walter Cronkite, Barry Goldwater, Ethan Phillips, Harry Reasoner, Stephen Stanton, George Wallace, Mike Wallace, Todd Weeks, Regi Davis, Samantha Bogach, Tim True, Bruce Noziak, Ned Van Zandt, Dan Desmond, Stoney Westmoreland, Eric Pumphrey, Bo Foxworth	
M A Y	27	X-Men: Apocalypse	20th Century Fox / Bad Hat Harry Productions / Marvel Entertainment / The Donners' Company	Bryan Singer (director); Simon Kinberg (screenplay); James McAvoy, Michael Fassbender, Jennifer Lawrence, Oscar Isaac, Nicholas Hoult, Rose Byrne, Tye Sheridan, Sophie Turner, Olivia Munn, Lucas Till	
M A Y	27	Alice Through the Looking Glass	Walt Disney Pictures	James Bobin (director); Linda Woolverton (screenplay); Johnny Depp, Anne Hathaway, Mia Wasikowska, Rhys Ifans, Helena Bonham Carter, Sacha Baron Cohen, Alan Rickman, Stephen Fry, Michael Sheen, Timothy Spall	
J U N E	3	Teenage Mutant Ninja Turtles: Out of the Shadows	Paramount Pictures / Nickelodeon Movies / Platinum Dunes	Dave Green (director); Josh Appelbaum, André Nemec (screenplay); Megan Fox, Will Arnett, Laura Linney, Stephen Amell, Noel Fisher, Jeremy Howard, Pete Ploszek, Alan Ritchson, Tyler Perry, Gary Anthony Williams, Brian Tee, Sheamus	
J U N E	3	Popstar: Never Stop Never Stopping	Universal Pictures / Perfect World Pictures	Akiva Schaffer, Jorma Taccone (directors/screenplay); Andy Samberg (screenplay); Andy Samberg, Jorma Taccone, Akiva Schaffer, Sarah Silverman, Tim Meadows	
J U N E	3	Me Before You	Warner Bros. Pictures	Thea Sharrock (director); Jojo Moyes (screenplay); Emilia Clarke, Sam Claflin, Janet McTeer, Charles Dance, Brendan Coyle	
J U N E	3	2 Jennifer	Reality Entertainment	Hunter Johnson (director/screenplay); Hunter Johnson, David Coupe, Lara Jean Mummert	
J U N E	10	The Conjuring 2	Warner Bros. Pictures / New Line Cinema / RatPac-Dune Entertainment	James Wan (director/screenplay); Chad Hayes, Carey W. Hayes, David Leslie Johnson-McGoldrick (screenplay); Vera Farmiga, Patrick Wilson, Frances O'Connor, Madison Wolfe, Simon McBurney, Franka Potente	
J U N E	10	Now You See Me 2	Summit Entertainment	Jon M. Chu (director); Ed Solomon (screenplay); Jesse Eisenberg, Mark Ruffalo, Woody Harrelson, Dave Franco, Daniel Radcliffe, Lizzy Caplan, Jay Chou, Sanaa Lathan, Michael Caine, Morgan Freeman	
J U N E	10	Warcraft	Universal Pictures / Legendary Pictures / Blizzard Entertainment / Atlas Entertainment	Duncan Jones (director/screenplay); Charles Leavitt (screenplay); Travis Fimmel, Paula Patton, Ben Foster, Dominic Cooper, Toby Kebbell, Ben Schnetzer, Robert Kazinsky, Daniel Wu	
J U N E	17	Finding Dory	Walt Disney Pictures / Pixar Animation Studios	Andrew Stanton (director/screenplay); Victoria Strouse (screenplay); Ellen DeGeneres, Albert Brooks, Hayden Rolence, Ed O'Neill, Kaitlin Olson, Ty Burrell, Diane Keaton, Eugene Levy	
J U N E	17	Central Intelligence	Warner Bros. Pictures / New Line Cinema / Universal Pictures / RatPac-Dune Entertainment / Perfect World Pictures / Bluegrass Films	Rawson Marshall Thurber (director/screenplay); Ike Barinholtz, David Stassen (screenplay); Dwayne Johnson, Kevin Hart, Amy Ryan, Aaron Paul	
J U N E	24	Independence Day: Resurgence	20th Century Fox / Centropolis Entertainment / Electric Entertainment	Roland Emmerich (director/screenplay); Nicolas Wright, James A. Woods, Dean Devlin, James Vanderbilt (screenplay); Liam Hemsworth, Jeff Goldblum, Bill Pullman, Maika Monroe, Travis Tope, William Fichtner, Charlotte Gainsbourg, Judd Hirsch	
J U N E	24	The Shallows	Columbia Pictures	Jaume Collet-Serra (director); Anthony Jaswinski (screenplay); Blake Lively	
J U N E	24	Free State of Jones	STX Entertainment	Gary Ross (director/screenplay); Matthew McConaughey, Gugu Mbatha-Raw, Mahershala Ali, Keri Russell	
J U N E	24	The Neon Demon	Amazon Studios / Broad Green Pictures	Nicolas Winding Refn (director/screenplay); Mary Laws, Polly Stenham (screenplay); Elle Fanning, Karl Glusman, Jena Malone, Bella Heathcote, Abbey Lee, Desmond Harrington, Christina Hendricks, Keanu Reeves	
J U N E	24	Swiss Army Man	A24	Daniels (directors/screenplay); Paul Dano, Daniel Radcliffe, Mary Elizabeth Winstead	
J U N E	24	Adventures in Babysitting	Disney Channel	John Schultz (director); Tiffany Paulsen (screenplay); Sabrina Carpenter, Sofia Carson, Nikki Hahn, Mallory James Mahoney, Kevin Quinn, Gillian Vigman, Gabrielle Miller, Ken Lawson	

== July–September ==
Opening		Title	Production company	Cast and crew	Ref.
J U L Y	1	The Legend of Tarzan	Warner Bros. Pictures / Village Roadshow Pictures / RatPac-Dune Entertainment	David Yates (director); Adam Cozad, Craig Brewer (screenplay); Alexander Skarsgård, Samuel L. Jackson, Margot Robbie, Djimon Hounsou, Jim Broadbent, Christoph Waltz	
J U L Y	1	The BFG	Walt Disney Pictures / Amblin Entertainment / Reliance Entertainment / Walden Media	Steven Spielberg (director); Melissa Mathison (screenplay); Mark Rylance, Ruby Barnhill, Penelope Wilton, Jemaine Clement, Rebecca Hall, Rafe Spall, Bill Hader	
J U L Y	1	The Purge: Election Year	Universal Pictures / Blumhouse Productions / Platinum Dunes	James DeMonaco (director/screenplay); Frank Grillo, Elizabeth Mitchell, Mykelti Williamson	
J U L Y	1	Marauders	Lionsgate Premiere / Emmett/Furla/Oasis Films	Steven C. Miller (director); Michael Cody, Chris Sivertson (screenplay); Christopher Meloni, Bruce Willis, Dave Bautista, Adrian Grenier, Johnathon Schaech, Lydia Hull, Tyler Jon Olson, Texas Battle	
J U L Y	8	The Secret Life of Pets	Universal Pictures / Illumination Entertainment	Chris Renaud (director); Cinco Paul, Ken Daurio, Brian Lynch (screenplay); Louis C.K., Eric Stonestreet, Kevin Hart, Jenny Slate, Ellie Kemper, Lake Bell, Dana Carvey, Hannibal Buress, Bobby Moynihan, Steve Coogan, Albert Brooks	
J U L Y	8	Captain Fantastic	Bleecker Street	Matt Ross (director/screenplay); Viggo Mortensen, Frank Langella, Kathryn Hahn, Steve Zahn	
J U L Y	8	Mike and Dave Need Wedding Dates	20th Century Fox / Chernin Entertainment	Jake Szymanski (director); Andrew J. Cohen, Brendan O'Brien (screenplay); Zac Efron, Anna Kendrick, Adam DeVine, Aubrey Plaza, Stephen Root	
J U L Y	12	Characterz	MarVista Entertainment	Jon Binkowski (director/screenplay); Lisa Enos Smith (screenplay); Mitchel Musso, Walt Willey, Miles D, Marc Musso, Ken Osmond, Isaac C. Singleton Jr., Michael Winslow, Felix Silla, Ana Eligio	
J U L Y	13	The Infiltrator	Broad Green Pictures	Brad Furman (director); Bryan Cranston, Diane Kruger, John Leguizamo, Benjamin Bratt, Yul Vazquez, Amy Ryan	
J U L Y	15	Café Society	Amazon Studios / Lionsgate	Woody Allen (director/screenplay); Jeannie Berlin, Steve Carell, Jesse Eisenberg, Blake Lively, Parker Posey, Kristen Stewart, Corey Stoll, Ken Stott	
J U L Y	15	Ghostbusters	Columbia Pictures / Village Roadshow Pictures / GhostCorps	Paul Feig (director/screenplay); Katie Dippold (screenplay); Melissa McCarthy, Kristen Wiig, Kate McKinnon, Leslie Jones, Charles Dance, Michael K. Williams, Chris Hemsworth	
J U L Y	22	Star Trek Beyond	Paramount Pictures / Skydance Media / Bad Robot	Justin Lin (director); Simon Pegg, Doug Jung (screenplay); John Cho, Simon Pegg, Chris Pine, Zachary Quinto, Zoe Saldaña, Karl Urban, Anton Yelchin, Idris Elba	
J U L Y	22	Batman: The Killing Joke	Warner Bros. Pictures / Fathom Events	Sam Liu (director); Brian Azzarello (screenplay); Kevin Conroy, Mark Hamill, Tara Strong, Ray Wise	
J U L Y	22	Ice Age: Collision Course	20th Century Fox / Blue Sky Studios	Michael Thurmeier (director); Michael J. Wilson, Michael Berg, Yoni Brenner (screenplay); Ray Romano, John Leguizamo, Denis Leary, Josh Peck, Simon Pegg, Seann William Scott, Jennifer Lopez, Queen Latifah, Chris Wedge, Wanda Sykes, Adam DeVine, Nick Offerman, Stephanie Beatriz, Max Greenfield, Jessie J, Jesse Tyler Ferguson, Neil deGrasse Tyson, Lilly Singh, Michael Strahan, Melissa Rauch, Matthew Simmons, Robert Cardone, Casey M. Roberts, Michael Thurmeier, Jorge Lucas, Carlos Ponce, James M. Palumbo, Andrew Christopher Nichols, Randy Thom, Ashley Peldon, Byron Thomas, Christopher Campbell, Dave Zyler, Edie Mirman, Holly Dorff, Hope Levy, Jackie Gonneau, Jason Fricchione, Juan Pope, Moosie Drier, Rif Hutton, Ruth Zalduondo, Terence Williams	
J U L Y	22	Lights Out	Warner Bros. Pictures / New Line Cinema / RatPac-Dune Entertainment / Atomic Monster	David F. Sandberg (director); Eric Heisserer (screenplay); Teresa Palmer, Gabriel Bateman, Alexander DiPersia, Billy Burke, Maria Bello	
J U L Y	27	Nerve	Lionsgate	Henry Joost, Ariel Schulman (directors); Jessica Sharzer (screenplay); Emma Roberts, Dave Franco, Juliette Lewis	
J U L Y	29	Jason Bourne	Universal Pictures / The Kennedy/Marshall Company / Perfect World Pictures	Paul Greengrass (director/screenplay); Christopher Rouse (screenplay); Matt Damon, Tommy Lee Jones, Alicia Vikander, Vincent Cassel, Julia Stiles, Riz Ahmed	
J U L Y	29	Bad Moms	STX Entertainment	Jon Lucas, Scott Moore (directors/screenplay); Mila Kunis, Kristen Bell, Kathryn Hahn, Annie Mumolo, Jada Pinkett Smith, Christina Applegate	
A U G U S T	5	Suicide Squad	Warner Bros. Pictures / DC Entertainment / RatPac-Dune Entertainment / Atlas Entertainment	David Ayer (director/screenplay); Will Smith, Jared Leto, Margot Robbie, Joel Kinnaman, Viola Davis, Jai Courtney, Jay Hernandez, Adewale Akinnuoye-Agbaje, Ike Barinholtz, Scott Eastwood, Cara Delevingne	
A U G U S T	12	Pete's Dragon	Walt Disney Pictures	David Lowery (director/screenplay); Toby Halbrooks (screenplay); Bryce Dallas Howard, Oakes Fegley, Wes Bentley, Karl Urban, Oona Laurence, Robert Redford	
A U G U S T	12	Sausage Party	Columbia Pictures / Annapurna Pictures / Point Grey Pictures	Conrad Vernon, Greg Tiernan (directors); Kyle Hunter, Ariel Shaffir, Seth Rogen, Evan Goldberg (screenplay); Seth Rogen, Kristen Wiig, Jonah Hill, Michael Cera, James Franco, Danny McBride, Paul Rudd, Edward Norton, Salma Hayek	
A U G U S T	12	Hell or High Water	Lionsgate / CBS Films / Sidney Kimmel Entertainment / OddLot Entertainment	David Mackenzie (director); Taylor Sheridan (screenplay); Jeff Bridges, Chris Pine, Ben Foster, Gil Birmingham	
A U G U S T	19	Ben-Hur	Paramount Pictures / Metro-Goldwyn-Mayer	Timur Bekmambetov (director); Keith Clarke, John Ridley (screenplay); Jack Huston, Toby Kebbell, Rodrigo Santoro, Nazanin Boniadi, Ayelet Zurer, Morgan Freeman	
A U G U S T	19	Kubo and the Two Strings	Focus Features / Laika	Travis Knight (director); Marc Haimes, Chris Butler (screenplay); Charlize Theron, Art Parkinson, Ralph Fiennes, Rooney Mara, George Takei, Matthew McConaughey	
A U G U S T	19	War Dogs	Warner Bros. Pictures	Todd Phillips (director/screenplay); Stephen Chin, Jason Smilovic (screenplay); Jonah Hill, Miles Teller, Ana de Armas, Bradley Cooper	
A U G U S T	19	A Tale of Love and Darkness	Focus Features / Voltage Pictures	Natalie Portman (director/screenplay); Natalie Portman, Gilad Kahana, Amir Tessler	
A U G U S T	26	Mechanic: Resurrection	Summit Premiere / Millennium Films	Dennis Gansel (director); Philip Shelby, Tony Mosher (screenplay); Jason Statham, Jessica Alba, Tommy Lee Jones, Michelle Yeoh, Sam Hazeldine	
A U G U S T	26	Don't Breathe	Screen Gems / Stage 6 Films	Fede Álvarez (director/screenplay); Rodo Sayagues (screenplay); Jane Levy, Dylan Minnette, Daniel Zovatto, Stephen Lang	
A U G U S T	26	Hands of Stone	The Weinstein Company	Jonathan Jakubowicz (director/screenplay); Édgar Ramírez, Robert De Niro, Usher	
A U G U S T	26	Ace the Case	Gravitas Ventures	Kevin Kaufman (director/screenplay); Ripley Sobo, Lev Gorn, Susan Sarandon, Marc Menchaca	
S E P T E M B E R	2	The 9th Life of Louis Drax	Summit Premiere / Miramax / Soda Pictures	Alexandre Aja (director); Max Minghella (screenplay); Jamie Dornan, Sarah Gadon, Aaron Paul, Aiden Longworth, Oliver Platt, Molly Parker, Julian Wadham, Jane McGregor, Barbara Hershey	
S E P T E M B E R	2	The Light Between Oceans	Touchstone Pictures / DreamWorks Pictures / Reliance Entertainment / Participant Media / Heyday Films	Derek Cianfrance (director/screenplay); Michael Fassbender, Alicia Vikander, Rachel Weisz, Bryan Brown, Jack Thompson	
S E P T E M B E R	2	Morgan	20th Century Fox	Luke Scott (director); Seth Owen (screenplay); Kate Mara, Anya Taylor-Joy, Toby Jones, Rose Leslie, Boyd Holbrook, Michelle Yeoh, Jennifer Jason Leigh, Paul Giamatti	
S E P T E M B E R	9	Sully	Warner Bros. Pictures / Village Roadshow Pictures / RatPac-Dune Entertainment / The Kennedy/Marshall Company	Clint Eastwood (director); Todd Komarnicki (screenplay); Tom Hanks, Aaron Eckhart, Laura Linney	
S E P T E M B E R	9	When the Bough Breaks	Screen Gems	Jon Cassar (director); Jack Olsen (screenplay); Morris Chestnut, Regina Hall, Jaz Sinclair, Romany Malco, Michael K. Williams, Theo Rossi	
S E P T E M B E R	9	The Disappointments Room	Rogue	D. J. Caruso (director/screenplay); Wentworth Miller (screenplay); Kate Beckinsale, Mel Raido, Gerald McRaney, Lucas Till	
S E P T E M B E R	16	Bridget Jones's Baby	Universal Pictures / StudioCanal / Miramax Films / Working Title Films / Perfect World Pictures	Sharon Maguire (director); Helen Fielding, Dan Mazer, Emma Thompson (screenplay); Renée Zellweger, Colin Firth, Patrick Dempsey, Jim Broadbent, Gemma Jones, Emma Thompson	
S E P T E M B E R	16	Snowden	Open Road Films	Oliver Stone (director/screenplay); Kieran Fitzgerald (screenplay); Joseph Gordon-Levitt, Shailene Woodley, Melissa Leo, Zachary Quinto, Tom Wilkinson, Scott Eastwood, Logan Marshall-Green, Timothy Olyphant, Ben Schnetzer, LaKeith Stanfield, Rhys Ifans, Nicolas Cage	
S E P T E M B E R	16	Blair Witch	Lionsgate / Vertigo Entertainment	Adam Wingard (director); Simon Barrett (screenplay); James Allen McCune, Callie Hernandez, Brandon Scott, Corbin Reid, Valorie Curry, Wes Robinson	
S E P T E M B E R	16	Hillsong: Let Hope Rise	Pure Flix	Michael John Warren (director); Joel Houston, Michael Guy Chislett, Matt Crocker, Jonathon Douglass, Jad Gillies, Simon Kobler, Jihea Oh, Taya Smith, Benjamin Tennikoff, Dylan Thomas	
S E P T E M B E R	16	The Last Descent	Excel Entertainment Group	Isaac Halasima (director/screenplay); Chadwick Hopson, Alexis "Lexy" Johnson, Landon Henneman, Jyllian Petrie, Jacob Omer, Mason D. Davis, Paul Tan, Mark Webb, Kendrey Flake	
S E P T E M B E R	23	The Magnificent Seven	Metro-Goldwyn-Mayer / Columbia Pictures / Village Roadshow Pictures	Antoine Fuqua (director); Nic Pizzolatto, Richard Wenk (screenplay); Denzel Washington, Chris Pratt, Ethan Hawke, Vincent D'Onofrio, Lee Byung-hun, Manuel Garcia-Rulfo, Martin Sensmeier, Peter Sarsgaard, Haley Bennett	
S E P T E M B E R	23	Queen of Katwe	Walt Disney Pictures / ESPN Films	Mira Nair (director); William Wheeler (screenplay); David Oyelowo, Lupita Nyong'o	
S E P T E M B E R	23	Storks	Warner Bros. Pictures / Warner Animation Group / RatPac-Dune Entertainment	Nicholas Stoller (director/screenplay); Doug Sweetland (director); Andy Samberg, Katie Crown, Kelsey Grammer, Jennifer Aniston, Ty Burrell, Keegan-Michael Key, Jordan Peele, Danny Trejo	
S E P T E M B E R	30	Miss Peregrine's Home for Peculiar Children	20th Century Fox / Chernin Entertainment	Tim Burton (director); Jane Goldman (screenplay); Eva Green, Asa Butterfield, Chris O'Dowd, Allison Janney, Rupert Everett, Terence Stamp, Ella Purnell, Judi Dench, Samuel L. Jackson	
S E P T E M B E R	30	Deepwater Horizon	Summit Entertainment / Participant Media	Peter Berg (director); Matthew Michael Carnahan, Matthew Sand (screenplay); Mark Wahlberg, Kurt Russell, John Malkovich, Gina Rodriguez, Dylan O'Brien, Kate Hudson	
S E P T E M B E R	30	Masterminds	Relativity Media	Jared Hess (director); Chris Bowman, Hubbel Palmer, Emily Spivey (screenplay); Zach Galifianakis, Owen Wilson, Kristen Wiig, Kate McKinnon, Leslie Jones, Jason Sudeikis	

== October–December ==
Opening		Title	Production company	Cast and crew	Ref.
O C T O B E R	7	The Girl on the Train	Universal Pictures / DreamWorks Pictures / Reliance Entertainment	Tate Taylor (director); Erin Cressida Wilson (screenplay); Emily Blunt, Rebecca Ferguson, Haley Bennett, Justin Theroux, Luke Evans, Allison Janney, Édgar Ramírez, Lisa Kudrow	
O C T O B E R	7	The Birth of a Nation	Fox Searchlight Pictures	Nate Parker (director/screenplay); Nate Parker, Armie Hammer, Mark Boone Junior, Colman Domingo, Aunjanue Ellis, Dwight Henry, Aja Naomi King, Esther Scott, Roger Guenveur Smith, Gabrielle Union, Penelope Ann Miller, Jackie Earle Haley	
O C T O B E R	7	Middle School: The Worst Years of My Life	Lionsgate / CBS Films	Steve Carr (director); Chris Bowman, Hubbel Palmer, Kara Holden (screenplay); Griffin Gluck, Lauren Graham, Rob Riggle, Thomas Barbusca, Andy Daly, Adam Pally, Retta	
O C T O B E R	7	The Alchemist Cookbook	Oscilloscope Laboratories	Joel Potrykus (director/screenplay); Ty Hickson, Amari Cheatom	
O C T O B E R	14	The Accountant	Warner Bros. Pictures / RatPac-Dune Entertainment	Gavin O'Connor (director); Bill Dubuque (screenplay); Ben Affleck, Anna Kendrick, J. K. Simmons, Jon Bernthal, Jeffrey Tambor, John Lithgow	
O C T O B E R	14	Kevin Hart: What Now?	Universal Pictures	Leslie Small, Tim Story (directors); Kevin Hart, Harry Ratchford, Joey Wells (screenplay); Kevin Hart	
O C T O B E R	14	Christine	The Orchard	Antonio Campos (director); Craig Shilowich (screenplay); Rebecca Hall, Michael C. Hall, Tracy Letts, Maria Dizzia, J. Smith-Cameron, John Cullum, Timothy Simons, Kim Shaw, Morgan Spector	
O C T O B E R	14	Max Steel	Open Road Films	Stewart Hendler (director); Christopher Yost (screenplay); Ben Winchell, Maria Bello, Ana Villafañe, Josh Brener, Andy García	
O C T O B E R	21	Jack Reacher: Never Go Back	Paramount Pictures / Skydance Media	Edward Zwick (director/screenplay); Richard Wenk, Marshall Herskovitz (screenplay); Tom Cruise, Cobie Smulders	
O C T O B E R	21	Keeping Up with the Joneses	20th Century Fox	Greg Mottola (director); Michael LeSieur (screenplay); Zach Galifianakis, Jon Hamm, Isla Fisher, Gal Gadot	
O C T O B E R	21	Ouija: Origin of Evil	Universal Pictures / Blumhouse Productions	Mike Flanagan (director/screenplay); Jeff Howard (screenplay); Elizabeth Reaser, Lulu Wilson, Annalise Basso, Henry Thomas	
O C T O B E R	21	Boo! A Madea Halloween	Lionsgate / Tyler Perry Studios	Tyler Perry (director/screenplay); Tyler Perry, Cassi Davis, Patrice Lovely, Yousef Erakat, Lexy Panterra, Andre Hall, Liza Koshy, Diamond White, Brock O'Hurn, Bella Thorne	
O C T O B E R	21	I'm Not Ashamed	Pure Flix	Brian Baugh (director); Bodie Thoene, Robin Hanley, Philipa Booyens, Kari Redmond (screenplay); Masey McLain, Ben Davies, Sadie Robertson, David Errigo Jr., Mark Daugherty, Cory Chapman, Taylor Kalupa, Korie Robertson, Ben VanderMey, Bella Robertson, Jennifer O'Neill, Cameron McKendry	
O C T O B E R	21	American Pastoral	Lionsgate / Lakeshore Entertainment	Ewan McGregor (director); John Romano (screenplay); Ewan McGregor, Jennifer Connelly, Dakota Fanning, Peter Riegert, Rupert Evans, Uzo Aduba, Molly Parker, David Strathairn	
O C T O B E R	28	Inferno	Columbia Pictures / Imagine Entertainment	Ron Howard (director); David Koepp (screenplay); Tom Hanks, Felicity Jones, Irrfan Khan, Omar Sy, Ben Foster, Sidse Babett Knudsen	
N O V E M B E R	4	Doctor Strange	Marvel Studios	Scott Derrickson (director/screenplay); Jon Spaihts, C. Robert Cargill (screenplay); Benedict Cumberbatch, Chiwetel Ejiofor, Rachel McAdams, Benedict Wong, Michael Stuhlbarg, Benjamin Bratt, Scott Adkins, Mads Mikkelsen, Tilda Swinton	
N O V E M B E R	4	Trolls	20th Century Fox / DreamWorks Animation	Mike Mitchell (director); Jonathan Aibel, Glenn Berger (screenplay); Anna Kendrick, Justin Timberlake, Zooey Deschanel, Russell Brand, James Corden, Gwen Stefani	
N O V E M B E R	4	Hacksaw Ridge	Summit Entertainment / Cross Creek Pictures	Mel Gibson (director); Robert Schenkkan, Andrew Knight (screenplay); Andrew Garfield, Sam Worthington, Luke Bracey, Teresa Palmer, Hugo Weaving, Rachel Griffiths, Vince Vaughn, Richard Pyros	
N O V E M B E R	4	Loving	Focus Features	Jeff Nichols (director/screenplay); Joel Edgerton, Ruth Negga, Marton Csokas, Nick Kroll, Michael Shannon	
N O V E M B E R	11	The Love Witch	Oscilloscope Laboratories	Anna Biller (director/screenplay); Samantha Robinson, Gian Keys, Laura Waddell, Jeffrey Vincent Parise, Jared Sanford, Robert Seeley, Jennifer Ingrum	
N O V E M B E R	11	Arrival	Paramount Pictures / FilmNation Entertainment / Lava Bear Films / 21 Laps Entertainment	Denis Villeneuve (director); Eric Heisserer (screenplay); Amy Adams, Jeremy Renner, Forest Whitaker, Michael Stuhlbarg, Tzi Ma	
N O V E M B E R	11	Billy Lynn's Long Halftime Walk	TriStar Pictures	Ang Lee (director); Jean-Christophe Castelli (screenplay); Joe Alwyn, Kristen Stewart, Chris Tucker, Garrett Hedlund, Vin Diesel, Steve Martin	
N O V E M B E R	11	Almost Christmas	Universal Pictures / Perfect World Pictures / Will Packer Productions	David E. Talbert (director/screenplay); Kimberly Elise, Danny Glover, John Michael Higgins, Romany Malco, Mo'Nique, J. B. Smoove, Gabrielle Union	
N O V E M B E R	18	Fantastic Beasts and Where to Find Them	Warner Bros. Pictures	David Yates (director), Eddie Redmayne, Katherine Waterston, Dan Folger, Alison Sudol, Ezra Miller, Samantha Morton, Jon Voight, Carmen Ejogo, Colin Farrell	
N O V E M B E R	18	The Edge of Seventeen	STXfilms	Kelly Fremon Craig (director/screenplay); Hailee Steinfeld, Woody Harrelson, Kyra Sedgwick, Haley Lu Richardson	
N O V E M B E R	18	Bleed for This	Open Road Films	Ben Younger (director/screenplay); Miles Teller, Aaron Eckhart, Katey Sagal, Ciarán Hinds, Ted Levine	
N O V E M B E R	18	Manchester by the Sea	Pearl Street Films	Kenneth Lonergan (director/screenplay), Casey Affleck, Michelle Williams, Kyle Chandler, Lucas Hedges	
N O V E M B E R	23	Moana	Walt Disney Pictures / Walt Disney Animation Studios	John Musker, Ron Clements (directors); Jared Bush (screenplay); Auliʻi Cravalho, Dwayne Johnson, Rachel House, Temuera Morrison, Jemaine Clement, Nicole Scherzinger, Alan Tudyk	
N O V E M B E R	23	Allied	Paramount Pictures	Robert Zemeckis (director); Steven Knight (screenplay); Brad Pitt, Marion Cotillard, Jared Harris, Simon McBurney, Lizzy Caplan, Daniel Betts, Matthew Goode	
N O V E M B E R	23	Bad Santa 2	Broad Green Pictures	Mark Waters (director); Johnny Rosenthal, Shauna Cross (screenplay); Billy Bob Thornton, Kathy Bates, Tony Cox, Christina Hendricks, Brett Kelly, Ryan Hansen, Jenny Zigrino, Jeff Skowron, Mike Starr	
N O V E M B E R	23	Rules Don't Apply	20th Century Fox / Regency Enterprises / RatPac-Dune Entertainment / Worldview Entertainment / Shangri-La Entertainment	Warren Beatty (director/screenplay); Warren Beatty, Annette Bening, Matthew Broderick, Lily Collins, Alden Ehrenreich	
D E C E M B E R	2	Incarnate	Blumhouse Productions / WWE Studios / IM Global	Brad Peyton (director); Ronnie Christensen (screenplay); Aaron Eckhart, Carice van Houten, Catalina Sandino Moreno, David Mazouz, Keir O'Donnell, Matt Nable, John Pirruccello	
D E C E M B E R	9	La La Land	Summit Entertainment	Damien Chazelle (director/writer); Ryan Gosling, Emma Stone, John Legend, Rosemarie DeWitt, Finn Wittrock, J. K. Simmons	
D E C E M B E R	9	Office Christmas Party	Paramount Pictures / DreamWorks Pictures / Reliance Entertainment / Bluegrass Films / Amblin Partners	Will Speck, Josh Gordon (directors); Justin Malen, Laura Solon, Dan Mazer (screenplay); Jason Bateman, Olivia Munn, T.J. Miller, Jillian Bell, Vanessa Bayer, Courtney B. Vance, Rob Corddry, Kate McKinnon, Jennifer Aniston	
D E C E M B E R	16	Collateral Beauty	Warner Bros. Pictures / New Line Cinema / Village Roadshow Pictures / RatPac-Dune Entertainment / Overbrook Entertainment / Anonymous Content	David Frankel (director); Allan Loeb (screenplay); Will Smith, Edward Norton, Keira Knightley, Michael Peña, Naomie Harris, Jacob Latimore, Kate Winslet, Helen Mirren	
D E C E M B E R	16	Fences	Paramount Pictures	Denzel Washington (director); August Wilson (screenplay); Denzel Washington, Viola Davis, Stephen McKinley Henderson, Jovan Adepo, Russell Hornsby, Mykelti Williamson, Saniyya Sidney	
D E C E M B E R	16	Rogue One: A Star Wars Story	Lucasfilm	Gareth Edwards (director); Chris Weitz, Tony Gilroy (screenplay); Felicity Jones, Diego Luna, Ben Mendelsohn, Donnie Yen, Mads Mikkelsen, Alan Tudyk, Jiang Wen, Forest Whitaker	
D E C E M B E R	16	The Founder	The Weinstein Company	John Lee Hancock (director); Robert Siegel (screenplay); Michael Keaton, Nick Offerman, John Carroll Lynch, Linda Cardellini, B. J. Novak, Laura Dern	
D E C E M B E R	21	Assassin's Creed	20th Century Fox / Regency Enterprises / Ubisoft Motion Pictures / DMC Film / The Kennedy/Marshall Company	Justin Kurzel (director); Michael Lesslie, Adam Cooper, Bill Collage (screenplay); Michael Fassbender, Marion Cotillard, Jeremy Irons, Brendan Gleeson, Charlotte Rampling, Michael K. Williams	
D E C E M B E R	21	Passengers	Columbia Pictures / Village Roadshow Pictures / Original Film / Start Motion Pictures	Morten Tyldum (director); Jon Spaihts (screenplay); Jennifer Lawrence, Chris Pratt, Michael Sheen, Laurence Fishburne, Andy García	
D E C E M B E R	21	Sing	Universal Pictures / Illumination Entertainment	Garth Jennings (director/screenplay); Matthew McConaughey, Reese Witherspoon, Seth MacFarlane, Scarlett Johansson, John C. Reilly, Taron Egerton, Tori Kelly	
D E C E M B E R	21	Patriots Day	Lionsgate / CBS Films	Peter Berg (director/screenplay); Matt Cook, Joshua Zetumer (screenplay); Mark Wahlberg, Kevin Bacon, John Goodman, J. K. Simmons, Michelle Monaghan	
D E C E M B E R	23	A Monster Calls	Focus Features / Entertainment One	J. A. Bayona (director); Patrick Ness (screenplay); Sigourney Weaver, Felicity Jones, Toby Kebbell, Lewis MacDougall, Liam Neeson	
D E C E M B E R	23	Silence	Paramount Pictures	Martin Scorsese (director/screenplay); Jay Cocks (screenplay); Andrew Garfield, Adam Driver, Tadanobu Asano, Ciarán Hinds, Liam Neeson	
D E C E M B E R	23	Why Him?	20th Century Fox / 21 Laps Entertainment / Red Hour Productions	John Hamburg (director/screenplay); Ian Helfer (screenplay); James Franco, Bryan Cranston, Megan Mullally, Zoey Deutch, Cedric the Entertainer, Griffin Gluck, Keegan-Michael Key	
D E C E M B E R	25	Hidden Figures	20th Century Fox / Chernin Entertainment	Theodore Melfi (director/screenplay); Allison Schroeder (screenplay); Taraji P. Henson, Octavia Spencer, Janelle Monáe, Kevin Costner, Kirsten Dunst, Jim Parsons, Mahershala Ali, Aldis Hodge, Glen Powell	
D E C E M B E R	25	Live by Night	Warner Bros. Pictures / RatPac Entertainment	Ben Affleck (director/screenplay); Ben Affleck, Elle Fanning, Brendan Gleeson, Chris Messina, Sienna Miller, Zoe Saldaña, Chris Cooper	
D E C E M B E R	28	Paterson	Amazon Studios / Bleecker Street	Jim Jarmusch (director/screenplay); Adam Driver, Golshifteh Farahani, Barry Shabaka Henley, Cliff Smith, Chasten Harmon, William Jackson Harper, Masatoshi Nagase	

== See also ==
- 2016 in American television
- 2016 in the United States
- List of 2016 box office number-one films in the United States
