= Kevin Kaufman =

American film producer

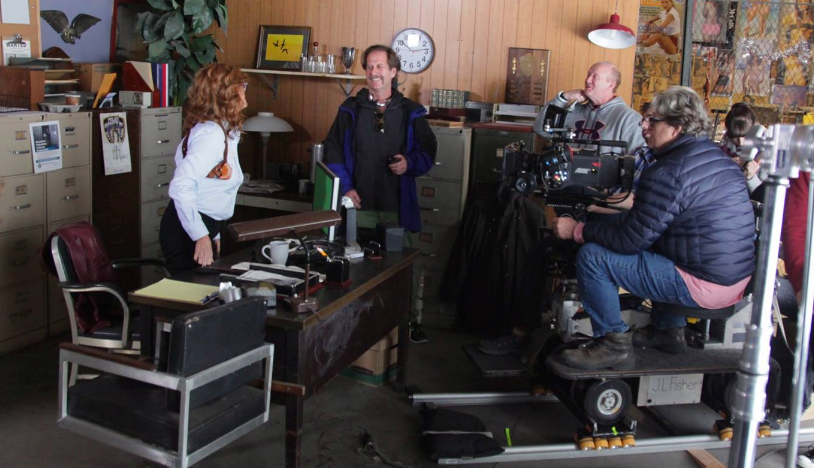
On the set of Ace the Case (L to R: Susan Sarandon, Kevin Kaufman, Rick Tirelli & Pat Darrin)

Kevin Kaufman is a director and executive producer of television series and feature films. He created the first The Real Housewives of Orange County, and directed and produced the 2016 feature film Ace the Case: Manhattan Mystery, starring Academy Award winner Susan Sarandon, and Ripley Sobo, star of Danny Boyle's Steve Jobs.

Film and television credits include:

- The Greatest of All Time with Photographer Walter Iooss, a three part miniseries documentary about sports photographer Walter Iooss. It features interviews from Kobe Bryant, Tiger Woods, Derek Jeter, Chris Evert, Joe Montana, Jack Nicklaus, Ken Griffey, Jr., Joe Namath, and Kelly Slater. Premiered on ESPN, ABC, and ESPN2 on March 7, 2021.
- Ace the Case: Manhattan Mystery, the feature film starring Oscar winner Susan Sarandon, Broadway's Ripley Sobo, and Lev Gorn. Written and directed by Kevin Kaufman, distributed by Gravitas Ventures.
- Gotti: Godfather and Son, the 4-hour Gotti family story never before told by John A. Gotti, brother Peter Gotti and sister Angel Gotti, which premiered in June 2018 on A&E. "This fascinating documentary series uses interviews with John Gotti Junior, police documents and family photos to give us a glimpse into the inner workings of the Mafia. Find out how a son of the most famous gangster in America turned into a man who now wants nothing to do with organized crime.” Reported Ira Rosen, producer for 60 Minutes.
- The Perfect Murder
- Ms. Homicide for LMN
- Season 1 of The Real Housewives of Orange County The first season and original spark that started it all for Bravo, with Jeana, Lauri, Vicki, Jo, and Kimberly helping make television history.
- The 100 Scariest Movie Moments mini-series for Bravo, winner of the Rondo Hatton Classic Horror Award for Best TV Presentation in 2004.
- The 22-episode series I Married a Mobster for Investigation Discovery
- Watching the Detectives and DEA Files for A&E
- The Greatest Fashion Icons in Film for TLC
- Family Pickle for RLTV, winner of the Cablefax Award for Best Show or Series Reality – Professions in 2013 and the New York Festivals Gold World Medal for Best Reality TV Drama in 2013. CableFax reported, "While many reality shows depend on contrived situations and producer-incited scuffles, this one does go “old school” by simply following around the eccentric family behind NYC's famous Carnegie Deli."
- The Palladium: Where Mambo Was King, which also aired on Bravo and won the Imagen Award for Best Television Documentary in 2003.
- Romeo & Julia in 1991, which won the Silver Award at the Houston International Film Festival.
