= Ace the Case =

- Directed by: Kevin Kaufman
- Written by: Kevin Kaufman
- Produced by: Kevin Kaufman
- Starring: Ripley Sobo; Lev Gorn; Susan Sarandon
- Cinematography: Pat Darrin
- Edited by: Kevin Kaufman
- Music by: David V. Catalano
- Production company: Kaufman Films
- Distributed by: Gravitas Ventures
- Release dates: August 26, 2016 (Bentonville Film Festival); August 26, 2016 (United States)
- Running time: 94 minutes
- Country: United States
- Language: English

Ace the Case is a 2016 American family mystery film written, produced and directed by Kevin Kaufman and starring Ripley Sobo, Lev Gorn, Susan Sarandon, and Marc Menchaca.

== Premise ==
An intrepid 10-year-old girl (Ripley Sobo) tries to help a veteran New York detective (Susan Sarandon) solve the kidnapping of a young woman (Luna Tieu).

== Cast ==
- Ripley Sobo as Olivia Haden
- Susan Sarandon as Detective Dottie Wheel
- Marc Menchaca as Gunner
- Lev Gorn as the Surgeon
- Aaron Sauter as Miles
- Ivana Kane as Julia
- Luca Manganaro as Stefano
- Arturo Castro as Juan
- Luna Tieu as Mei Wong
- Johnny Tran as Shan
- Ginna Le Vine as Gena
- Esther Zyskind as Jill

== Soundtrack ==
Unhappy Ending by Lindsey Cohen

Aim High by Ripley Sobo

== Reception ==
The film has a 20% rating on Rotten Tomatoes. Sandie Angulo Chen of Common Sense Media awarded the film two stars out of five.
