= Workaholics season 5 =

Workaholics
- Season 5
- DVD cover
- No. of episodes: 13

Release
- Original network: Comedy Central
- Original release: January 14 – April 8, 2015

Season chronology
- ← Previous; Season 4 Next → Season 6

The fifth season of the American situational comedy Workaholics premiered on Comedy Central on January 14, 2015, and concluded on April 8, 2015, with a total of 13 episodes.

== Cast ==
=== Main ===
==== Starring ====
- Blake Anderson as Blake Henderson
- Adam DeVine as Adam DeMamp
- Anders Holm as Anders "Ders" Holmvik

==== Also starring ====
- Jillian Bell as Jillian Belk (Note: Bell is only credited for the episodes in which she appears.)
- Erik Griffin as Montez Walker (Note: Only credited for the episodes in which he appears.)
- Maribeth Monroe as Alice Murphy (Note: Monroe is only credited for the episodes in which she appears.)

=== Recurring ===
- Kyle Newacheck as Karl Hevacheck
- Bill Stevenson as Bill
- Waymond Lee as Waymond

=== Guest ===
- Seth Morris as Landon
- Alessandra Torresani as Crystal
- Crista Flanagan as Professor
- Matthew Lawrence as Lance
- Pete Ploszek as Brock
- Ben Stiller as Del Jacobson
- Christopher Backus as Water Guy
- Alan Ritchson as Torpey
- Chyna Layne as Sherry
- Michael Urie as Joey
- Jerry O'Connell as Teddy
- Karen Strassman as Paula the Waitress
- Jack Black as Pritchard
- Amy Yasbeck as Annette
- Steve Howey as Blue Knight DeMamp
- Dolph Lundgren as himself
- Valerie Mahaffey as Celeste
- Ashley Hinshaw as Hilary Winthrop
- Curtis Armstrong as Richard Ottmar
- Leonard Wu as Fred
- Marcus Toji as Brian
- Ryan Gaul as Ryan Gaul
- Tom Arnold as George
- Mark McGrath as Mark McGrath

== Production ==
Comedy Central renewed the series for a 13-episode fourth and fifth season on January 6, 2013.

== Episodes ==
No. overall	No. in season	Title	Directed by	Written by	Original release date	Prod. code	US viewers (millions)
54	1	"Dorm Daze"	Kyle Newacheck	Sean Clements & Dominic Dierkes	January 14, 2015	504	1.10
An attempt to recruit college students to TelAmeriCorp leads the boys to a college campus that Adam quickly realizes is the home of his favorite pornographic webseries. In looking for the famed room that hosted the majority of the porn production company's shoots, Adam finds himself struggling with the true meaning of pornography after he mistakenly takes part in a women's studies class while Blake gets inadvertently roped into participating in the company's newest porn shoot.
55	2	"Front Yard Wrestling"	Adam Newacheck	Kevin Etten	January 21, 2015	503	0.95
The gang makes their own public access wrestling show to make long overdue rent money.
56	3	"Speedo Racer"	Kyle Newacheck	Anders Holm	January 28, 2015	501	0.89
The guys help Ders get even with an old high school swim team rival.
57	4	"Menergy Crisis"	Adam Newacheck	Blake Anderson	February 4, 2015	507	0.81
The boys form a band after writing a song together, but kick Blake out after discovering that he can't sing very well. Abandoned, Blake swears revenge on Adam and Ders and vows to do whatever it takes to sabotage their "concert" at the upcoming work party.
58	5	"Gayborhood"	Kyle Newacheck	Craig DiGregorio	February 11, 2015	508	0.77
The boys crash a neighborhood "Pride" party for gay men, mistaking it for an MMA-themed bash. Desperate to fit in (due to the free liquor and snacks) they drink heavily and pretend to be gay themselves, to the point in which they wake up with terrible hangovers and little recollection of what happened, only to be informed that they may have gotten closer with each other in ways that make them uncomfortable.
59	6	"Ditch Day"	Christian Hoffman	Craig Digregorio	February 18, 2015	502	0.91
The guys agree to hand off a mysterious package for Karl and, in turn, stage an office wide ditch day so they can stay home and make the deal.
60	7	"Gramps DeMamp Is Dead"	Kyle Newacheck	Scotty Landes	February 25, 2015	506	0.93
Adam & his father risk it all to give Gramps a proper DeMamp funeral. Jack Black guest stars as Adam's father.
61	8	"Blood Drive"	Anders Holm	Zoe Jarman & Sarah Peters	March 4, 2015	505	0.94
The guys try to win an office blood drive in order to meet their idol, Dolph Lundgren.
62	9	"Wedding Thrashers"	Adam Newacheck	Sean Clements & Dominic Dierkes	March 11, 2015	509	0.85
The gang parties with a rich girl at a bar. Adam likes her but thinks he's going to lose the gang if he dates her. They take him on his dream bachelor party as a send-off.
63	10	"Trivia Pursuits"	Jay Karas	Anders Holm	March 18, 2015	510	0.72
The gang plays 80's movie trivia and they decide to scam their competitors.
64	11	"The Slump"	Adam Devine	Adam Devine	March 25, 2015	511	0.94
Adam is in a sales slump because he lost the top gun (top salesman) of the month award. Blake and Ders cheer him up by making up a fake customer named Dick Blownoff.
65	12	"Peyote It Forward"	Kyle Newacheck	Kevin Etten	April 1, 2015	512	0.75
Adam laces the gang's smoothies with peyote. Meanwhile, they have to watch a kid.
66	13	"TAC in the Day"	Kevin Etten	Craig Digregorio & Sean Clements & Dominic Dierkes	April 8, 2015	513	0.83
The guys reminisce about their first day of work at TelAmeriCorp.
