= List of Workaholics episodes =

Workaholics is an American television sitcom that ran on Comedy Central from April 6, 2011 to March 15, 2017, with a total of 86 episodes spanning seven seasons. The series stars Blake Anderson, Adam DeVine, and Anders Holm of the comedy troupe Mail Order Comedy as three college dropouts, also roommates and friends, who work together at the telemarketing company TelAmeriCorp.

== Series overview ==
Season	Episodes	Originally released	
Season	Episodes	First released	Last released
1	10	April 6, 2011	June 8, 2011
2	10	September 20, 2011	November 22, 2011
3	20	May 29, 2012	March 20, 2013
4	13	January 22, 2014	April 16, 2014
5	13	January 14, 2015	April 8, 2015
6	10	January 14, 2016	March 17, 2016
7	10	January 11, 2017	March 15, 2017

== Episodes ==
=== Season 1 (2011) ===
No. overall	No. in season	Title	Directed by	Written by	Original release date	Prod. code	US viewers (millions)
1	1	"Pilot: Piss & Shit"	Kyle Newacheck	Blake Anderson, Adam Devine, Anders Holm, Kyle Newacheck, Connor Pritchard & Dominic Russo	April 6, 2011	101	1.10
2	2	"We Be Ballin'"	Kyle Newacheck	Blake Anderson	April 13, 2011	102	1.05
3	3	"Office Campout"	Chris Koch	Adam Devine	April 20, 2011	103	0.94
4	4	"The Promotion"	Chris Koch	Kevin Etten & Anders Holm	April 27, 2011	104	1.44
5	5	"Checkpoint Gnarly"	Kyle Newacheck	Leila Strachan	May 4, 2011	105	1.45
6	6	"The Strike"	Chris Koch	Brian Keith Etheridge & David King	May 11, 2011	106	1.35
7	7	"Straight Up Juggahos"	Kyle Newacheck	Kevin Etten	May 18, 2011	107	1.49
8	8	"To Friend a Predator"	Kyle Newacheck	Anders Holm	May 25, 2011	108	1.51
9	9	"Muscle I'd Like to Flex"	Chris Koch	Kyle Newacheck	June 1, 2011	109	1.65
10	10	"In the Line of Getting Fired"	Kyle Newacheck	Kevin Etten & Anders Holm	June 8, 2011	110	1.36

=== Season 2 (2011) ===
No. overall	No. in season	Title	Directed by	Written by	Original release date	Prod. code	US viewers (millions)
11	1	"Heist School"	Tristram Shapeero	Kevin Etten	September 20, 2011	203	2.13
12	2	"Dry Guys"	Kyle Newacheck	Kyle Newacheck	September 27, 2011	201	1.77
13	3	"Temp-Tress"	Kyle Newacheck	Anders Holm	October 4, 2011	202	1.71
14	4	"Model Kombat"	Tristram Shapeero	David King	October 11, 2011	205	1.98
15	5	"Old Man Ders"	Kyle Newacheck	Scott Rutherford	October 18, 2011	206	1.98
16	6	"Stop! Pajama Time"	Kyle Newacheck	Blake Anderson	October 25, 2011	207	1.65
17	7	"Teenage Mutant Ninja Roommates"	Kyle Newacheck	Leila Strachan	November 1, 2011	208	2.16
18	8	"Karl's Wedding"	Jay Karas	Kevin Etten	November 8, 2011	209	1.82
19	9	"Man Up"	Kyle Newacheck	Anders Holm	November 15, 2011	210	1.67
20	10	"6 Hours Till Hedonism II"	Kyle Newacheck	Adam DeVine	November 22, 2011	204	1.48

=== Season 3 (2012–13) ===
No. overall	No. in season	Title	Directed by	Written by	Original release date	Prod. code	US viewers (millions)
21	1	"The Business Trip"	Kyle Newacheck	Craig Digregorio	May 29, 2012	303	2.11
22	2	"True Dromance"	Tristram Shapeero	Sean Clements & Dominic Dierkes	June 5, 2012	302	1.51
23	3	"Fat Cuz"	Kyle Newacheck	Anders Holm	June 12, 2012	301	1.25
24	4	"To Kill a Chupacabraj"	Kyle Newacheck & Tristram Shapeero	Bill Krebs	June 19, 2012	305	1.46
25	5	"Good Mourning"	Tristram Shapeero	Kyle Newacheck	June 26, 2012	304	1.60
26	6	"The Meat Jerking Beef Boys"	Eric Appel	Sean Clements, Dominic Dierkes & Bill Krebs	July 3, 2012	306	1.41
27	7	"The Lord's Force"	John Fortenberry	Blake Anderson	July 10, 2012	307	1.49
28	8	"Real Time"	Kyle Newacheck	Kevin Etten	July 17, 2012	308	1.18
29	9	"Ders Comes in Handy"	Chris Koch	Ryan Koh	July 24, 2012	309	1.54
30	10	"Flashback in the Day"	Kyle Newacheck	Adam DeVine	July 31, 2012	310	1.34
31	11	"Booger Nights"	Jay Karas	Kevin Etten	January 16, 2013	314	1.72
32	12	"A TelAmerican Horror Story"	Kyle Newacheck	Sean Clements & Dominic Dierkes	January 23, 2013	311	1.38
33	13	"Alice Quits"	Kyle Newacheck	Anders Holm	January 30, 2013	313	1.30
34	14	"Fourth and Inches"	Kyle Newacheck	Sean Clements & Dominic Dierkes	February 6, 2013	315	1.59
35	15	"Webcam Girl"	Christian Hoffman	John Carcieri	February 13, 2013	312	1.30
36	16	"High Art"	Ben Berman	Sean Clements & Dominic Dierkes	February 20, 2013	316	1.17
37	17	"The Worst Generation"	Ben Berman	Tony Goodman & Steven White	February 27, 2013	318	1.09
38	18	"Hungry Like the Wolf Dog"	Kyle Newachek	Craig Digregorio	March 6, 2013	317	1.23
39	19	"In Line"	Rob Schrab	Adam Devine	March 13, 2013	319	1.21
40	20	"The Future Is Gnar"	Kyle Newachek	Blake Anderson	March 20, 2013	320	1.24

=== Season 4 (2014) ===
No. overall	No. in season	Title	Directed by	Written by	Original release date	Prod. code	US viewers (millions)
41	1	"Orgazmo Birth"	Kyle Newacheck	Kevin Etten	January 22, 2014	404	1.47
42	2	"Fry Guys"	Kyle Newacheck	Sean Clements & Dominic Dierkes	January 29, 2014	403	1.30
43	3	"Snackers"	Christian Hoffman	Dana Scanlon	February 5, 2014	402	1.38
44	4	"Miss BS"	Jay Karas	Sean Clements & Dominic Dierkes	February 12, 2014	409	1.27
45	5	"Three and a Half Men"	Kevin Etten	Noah Garfinkel	February 19, 2014	406	1.21
46	6	"Brociopath"	Kyle Newacheck	Craig Digregorio	February 26, 2014	401	1.32
47	7	"We Be Clownin'"	Rob Schrab	Anders Holm	March 5, 2014	405	1.36
48	8	"Beer Heist"	Kyle Newacheck	Scotty Landes	March 12, 2014	410	1.38
49	9	"Best Buds"	Anders Holm	Anders Holm	March 19, 2014	407	1.21
50	10	"Timechair"	Kyle Newacheck	Craig Digregorio	March 26, 2014	412	1.08
51	11	"The One Where the Guys Play Basketball and Do the "Friends" Title Thing"	Jay Karas	Anders Holm & Kevin Etten	April 2, 2014	413	1.25
52	12	"DeputyDong"	Jay Karas	Blake Anderson	April 9, 2014	411	1.04
53	13	"Friendship Anniversary"	Kyle Newacheck	Adam Devine	April 16, 2014	408	0.98

=== Season 5 (2015) ===
No. overall	No. in season	Title	Directed by	Written by	Original release date	Prod. code	US viewers (millions)
54	1	"Dorm Daze"	Kyle Newacheck	Sean Clements & Dominic Dierkes	January 14, 2015	504	1.10
55	2	"Front Yard Wrestling"	Adam Newacheck	Kevin Etten	January 21, 2015	503	0.95
56	3	"Speedo Racer"	Kyle Newacheck	Anders Holm	January 28, 2015	501	0.89
57	4	"Menergy Crisis"	Adam Newacheck	Blake Anderson	February 4, 2015	507	0.81
58	5	"Gayborhood"	Kyle Newacheck	Craig DiGregorio	February 11, 2015	508	0.77
59	6	"Ditch Day"	Christian Hoffman	Craig Digregorio	February 18, 2015	502	0.91
60	7	"Gramps DeMamp Is Dead"	Kyle Newacheck	Scotty Landes	February 25, 2015	506	0.93
61	8	"Blood Drive"	Anders Holm	Zoe Jarman & Sarah Peters	March 4, 2015	505	0.94
62	9	"Wedding Thrashers"	Adam Newacheck	Sean Clements & Dominic Dierkes	March 11, 2015	509	0.85
63	10	"Trivia Pursuits"	Jay Karas	Anders Holm	March 18, 2015	510	0.72
64	11	"The Slump"	Adam Devine	Adam Devine	March 25, 2015	511	0.94
65	12	"Peyote It Forward"	Kyle Newacheck	Kevin Etten	April 1, 2015	512	0.75
66	13	"TAC in the Day"	Kevin Etten	Craig Digregorio & Sean Clements & Dominic Dierkes	April 8, 2015	513	0.83

=== Season 6 (2016) ===
No. overall	No. in season	Title	Directed by	Written by	Original release date	Prod. code	US viewers (millions)
67	1	"Wolves of Rancho"	Adam DeVine	Kevin Etten	January 14, 2016	606	0.65
68	2	"Meth Head Actor"	Kyle Newacheck	Ben Rodgers	January 21, 2016	607	0.61
69	3	"Save the Cat"	Christian Hoffman	Anders Holm	January 28, 2016	602	0.51
70	4	"Death of a Salesdude"	Anders Holm	Sarah Peters & Zoe Jarman	February 4, 2016	601	0.51
71	5	"Gone Catfishing"	Kyle Newacheck	Scotty Landes	February 11, 2016	605	0.55
72	6	"Going Viral"	Kyle Newacheck	Alex Blagg	February 18, 2016	604	0.54
73	7	"Night at the Dudeseum"	Adam Newacheck	Jen D'Angelo	February 25, 2016	608	0.58
74	8	"The Fabulous Murphy Sisters"	Kevin Etten	John Quaintance & Scotty Landes	March 3, 2016	610	0.44
75	9	"Always Bet on Blake"	Kyle Newacheck	Blake Anderson	March 10, 2016	609	0.48
76	10	"The Nuttin' Professor"	Kyle Newacheck	John Quaintance	March 17, 2016	603	0.48

=== Season 7 (2017) ===
No. overall	No. in season	Title	Directed by	Written by	Original release date	Prod. code	US viewers (millions)
77	1	"Trainees' Day"	Christian Hoffman	Ben Rodgers	January 11, 2017	702	0.48
78	2	"Weed the People"	Adam Newacheck	Scotty Landes	January 18, 2017	704	0.46
79	3	"Monstalibooyah"	Adam Newacheck	Devin Field	January 25, 2017	707	0.55
80	4	"Bill & Tez's Sexcellent Sexventure"	Kyle Newacheck	Kevin Etten	February 1, 2017	703	0.48
81	5	"Faux Chella"	Jay Karas	Zoe Jarman	February 8, 2017	705	0.40
82	6	"The Most Dangerless Game"	Kyle Newacheck	John Quaintance	February 15, 2017	701	0.46
83	7	"Tactona 420"	Anders Holm	Jen D'Angelo	February 22, 2017	706	0.51
84	8	"Termidate"	Jay Karas	Blake Anderson	March 1, 2017	708	0.52
85	9	"Bianca Toro"	Kevin Etten	John Quaintance & Scotty Landes	March 8, 2017	709	0.46
86	10	"Party Gawds"	Kyle Newacheck	Anders Holm	March 15, 2017	710	0.43

== Ratings ==
Workaholics : U.S. viewers per episode (millions)

Season	Episode number																			
Season	1	2	3	4	5	6	7	8	9	10	11	12	13	14	15	16	17	18	19	20
1	1.10	1.05	0.94	1.44	1.45	1.35	1.49	1.51	1.65	1.36	–									
2	2.13	1.77	1.71	1.98	1.98	1.65	2.16	1.82	1.67	1.48	–									
3	2.11	1.51	1.25	1.46	1.60	1.41	1.49	1.18	1.54	1.34	1.72	1.38	1.30	1.59	1.30	1.17	1.09	1.23	1.21	1.24
4	1.47	1.30	1.38	1.27	1.21	1.32	1.36	1.38	1.21	1.08	1.25	1.04	0.98	–						
5	1.10	0.95	0.89	0.81	0.77	0.91	0.93	0.94	0.85	0.72	0.94	0.75	0.83	–						
6	0.65	0.61	0.51	0.51	0.55	0.54	0.58	0.44	0.48	0.48	–									
7	0.48	0.46	0.55	0.48	0.40	0.46	0.51	0.52	0.46	0.46	–									

Audience measurement performed by Nielsen Media Research
