= Workaholics season 4 =

Workaholics
- Season 4
- DVD cover
- No. of episodes: 13

Release
- Original network: Comedy Central
- Original release: January 22 – April 16, 2014

Season chronology
- ← Previous; Season 3 Next → Season 5

The fourth season of Workaholics premiered on Comedy Central on January 22, 2014, and concluded on April 16, 2014, with a total of 13 episodes.

== Cast ==
=== Main ===
==== Starring ====
- Blake Anderson as Blake Henderson
- Adam DeVine as Adam DeMamp
- Anders Holm as Anders "Ders" Holmvik

==== Also starring ====
- Jillian Bell as Jillian Belk (Note: Bell is only credited for the episodes in which she appears.)
- Erik Griffin as Montez Walker (Note: Only credited for the episodes in which he appears.)
- Maribeth Monroe as Alice Murphy (Note: Monroe is only credited for the episodes in which she appears.)

=== Recurring ===
- Kyle Newacheck as Karl Hevacheck
- Bill Stevenson as Bill
- Waymond Lee as Waymond

=== Guest ===
- Alex Borstein as Colleen Walker
- Kyle Bornheimer as Girthquake
- Giselle Bonilla as Luna
- Erinn Hayes as Miss BS
- Cerina Vincent as Laura
- H. Michael Croner as Derek
- Lorenzo Lamas as Rick Messina
- Skyler Day as Brooke
- Denyse Tontz as Kim
- Katherine McNamara as Haley
- Fortune Feimster as Jo
- Joey Kern as Todd
- Marc Evan Jackson as Dr. Gerald Landes
- Leslie Jones as Lynette
- Philip 'Hot Sauce' Champion from AND1 as George
- Kevin Heffernan as Officer Don Burton
- Bridger Zadina as Nate
- Stephen Kramer Glickman as Trevor

== Production ==
On January 6, 2013, Comedy Central renewed Workaholics for a 13-episode fourth and fifth season respectively.

== Episodes ==
No. overall	No. in season	Title	Directed by	Written by	Original release date	Prod. code	US viewers (millions)
41	1	"Orgazmo Birth"	Kyle Newacheck	Kevin Etten	January 22, 2014	404	1.47
The guys prepare for an electronic music festival by stocking up on Molly, but they cannot get their tickets without Montez, whose wife Colleen insists he stay at home for her baby shower. They then try to distract her by throwing an impromptu dance party in Montez's back yard.
42	2	"Fry Guys"	Kyle Newacheck	Sean Clements & Dominic Dierkes	January 29, 2014	403	1.30
The guys try to get Alice laid so they can have an office fish fry.
43	3	"Snackers"	Christian Hoffman	Dana Scanlon	February 5, 2014	402	1.38
The office holds an election to decide who’s in charge of breakroom snacks.
44	4	"Miss BS"	Jay Karas	Sean Clements & Dominic Dierkes	February 12, 2014	409	1.27
When the guys encounter a television journalist who exposes scams they put the entire office in jeopardy.
45	5	"Three and a Half Men"	Kevin Etten	Noah Garfinkel	February 19, 2014	406	1.21
Alice puts the guys in charge of making a TelAmericorp video to gain business. Adam's idea is to make it a Super Size Me-style documentary about him eating a thousand hot dogs in a week, but Ders would rather film Karl, who has made a decision to have his penis removed and surgically attached to Blake's.
46	6	"Brociopath"	Kyle Newacheck	Craig Digregorio	February 26, 2014	401	1.32
When the guys' house party starts winding down early, the night is saved by the ultimate frat bro, Stan Halen. The trio takes a liking to him, especially Adam, but Stan quickly becomes a nuisance.
47	7	"We Be Clownin'"	Rob Schrab	Anders Holm	March 5, 2014	405	1.36
To pay for a pool slide, the guys become children party clowns.
48	8	"Beer Heist"	Kyle Newacheck	Scotty Landes	March 12, 2014	410	1.38
The guys go to any length to impress college girls.
49	9	"Best Buds"	Anders Holm	Anders Holm	March 19, 2014	407	1.21
The guys quit their marketing jobs to go work at Karl's new Burrito store that sells "burweedos". But Adam and Blake start to hate their new jobs as they feel that Ders and Karl are treating them unfairly.
50	10	"Timechair"	Kyle Newacheck	Craig Digregorio	March 26, 2014	412	1.08
In this episode the boys are offered a free massage chair, but they cannot decide where to keep the chair so they race against each other to claim the chair for themselves.
51	11	"The One Where the Guys Play Basketball and Do the "Friends" Title Thing"	Jay Karas	Anders Holm & Kevin Etten	April 2, 2014	413	1.25
The boys enter a TelAmeriCorp basketball competition to win a trip to Reno in a company car, but things become a little difficult after Blake quits the team and Adam lands himself in hospital.
52	12	"DeputyDong"	Jay Karas	Blake Anderson	April 9, 2014	411	1.04
After being tormented online by a gamer known as 'DeputyDong', the guys decide to take matters into their own hands.
53	13	"Friendship Anniversary"	Kyle Newacheck	Adam Devine	April 16, 2014	408	0.98
On the seventh anniversary of living together, the boys find that their life together isn't all fun and games.
