= Workaholics season 7 =

Workaholics
- Season 7
- DVD cover
- No. of episodes: 10

Release
- Original network: Comedy Central
- Original release: January 11 – March 15, 2017

Season chronology
- ← Previous; Season 6

The seventh and final season of Workaholics premiered on Comedy Central at 10/9c on January 11 and ended its run of 10 episodes on March 15, 2017.

== Cast ==
=== Main ===
==== Starring ====
- Blake Anderson as Blake Henderson
- Adam DeVine as Adam DeMamp
- Anders Holm as Anders "Ders" Holmvik

==== Also starring ====
- Jillian Bell as Jillian Belk (Note: Bell is only credited for the episodes in which she appears.)
- Erik Griffin as Montez Walker (Note: Only credited for the episodes in which he appears.)
- Maribeth Monroe as Alice Murphy (Note: Monroe is only credited for the episodes in which she appears.)

=== Recurring ===
- Kyle Newacheck as Karl Hevacheck
- Bill Stevenson as Bill
- Waymond Lee as Waymond
- Gil Harris as Gil
- Didi Tillson as Didi

=== Guest ===
- Andrew Bachelor as Colt
- Dennis Quaid as Ted Murphy
- Topher Grace as Noel
- Amanda Cerny as Colleen
- Stephen Oyoung as Waiter
- Paul Dooley as Ralph
- Chuck Liddell as Uncle Mike
- Amanda Payton as Megan
- Cary Elwes as Fox
- Tom Wilson as Barnes
- Elden Henson as Nipples
- Tucker Smallwood as Pastor
- Nina Dobrev as Courtnee
- Flula Borg as Jimmy Sparx
- Mo Collins as Bianca Toro
- Craig Kilborn as Kurt Fossil
- Jason Mantzoukas as Isaac Lubetkin
- Jack Quaid as Clark
- Sam Lerner as Michael
- Tony Revolori as Dougie
- Paul Scheer as Fest Manager

== Production ==
On July 5, 2015, Comedy Central renewed Workaholics for a sixth and seventh season respectively. The final season was confirmed on November 3, 2016, after Adam DeVine first hinted back in July that year about Season 7 being the last at the time he along with Anderson and Holm were already preparing to move on to other projects.

== Episodes ==
No. overall	No. in season	Title	Directed by	Written by	Original release date	Prod. code	US viewers (millions)
77	1	"Trainees' Day"	Christian Hoffman	Ben Rodgers	January 11, 2017	702	0.48
The guys compete with a group of trainees for the title of 'best office pranksters'.
78	2	"Weed the People"	Adam Newacheck	Scotty Landes	January 18, 2017	704	0.46
The guys add something to Alice's father's new product to drive up sales.
79	3	"Monstalibooyah"	Adam Newacheck	Devin Field	January 25, 2017	707	0.55
The guys try to make the most of their stay at the TelAmeriCorp beachside timeshare.
80	4	"Bill & Tez's Sexcellent Sexventure"	Kyle Newacheck	Kevin Etten	February 1, 2017	703	0.48
Bill becomes the transportationer during a business trip through Chinatown.
81	5	"Faux Chella"	Jay Karas	Zoe Jarman	February 8, 2017	705	0.40
In order to impress festival girls, the guys throw their own version of Coachella
82	6	"The Most Dangerless Game"	Kyle Newacheck	John Quaintance	February 15, 2017	701	0.46
The guys see danger everywhere while on a trip to a remote mountain cabin
83	7	"Tactona 420"	Anders Holm	Jen D'Angelo	February 22, 2017	706	0.51
The guys race their coworkers for the rights to sell a line of remote control cars.
84	8	"Termidate"	Jay Karas	Blake Anderson	March 1, 2017	708	0.52
The guys recall competing together on a reality dating show.
85	9	"Bianca Toro"	Kevin Etten	John Quaintance & Scotty Landes	March 8, 2017	709	0.46
The guys try to get rid of a motivational speaker when she begins interfering with a beloved office awards show.
86	10	"Party Gawds"	Kyle Newacheck	Anders Holm	March 15, 2017	710	0.43
The guys become party gods after an energy drink company starts paying them to throw ragers.
