= Workaholics season 3 =

Workaholics
- Season 3
- DVD cover
- No. of episodes: 20

Release
- Original network: Comedy Central
- Original release: May 29, 2012 – March 20, 2013

Season chronology
- ← Previous; Season 2 Next → Season 4

The third season of Workaholics premiered on Comedy Central May 29, 2012, and concluded on March 20, 2013. This season was split into two parts with each part consisting of a total of 10 episodes. The first half aired on May 29 and concluded on July 31, 2012, while the second half aired on January 16 and concluded on March 20, 2013.

== Cast ==
=== Main ===
==== Starring ====
- Blake Anderson as Blake Henderson
- Adam DeVine as Adam DeMamp
- Anders Holm as Anders "Ders" Holmvik

==== Also starring ====
- Jillian Bell as Jillian Belk (Note: Bell is only credited for the episodes in which she appears.)
- Erik Griffin as Montez Walker (Note: Only credited for the episodes in which he appears.)
- Maribeth Monroe as Alice Murphy (Note: Monroe is only credited for the episodes in which she appears.)

==== Recurring ====
- Kyle Newacheck as Karl Hevachek
- Bill Stevenson as Bill (Note: Credited as a co-star in four episodes.)
- Jesse Hudson as Jet Set
- Waymond Lee as Waymond

==== Guest ====
- Kiersten Warren as Gayle Reynolds
- Eric Pierpoint as Don Walter
- D.C. Douglas as Tattoo Artist
- Lori Beth Denberg as Herself
- Jeff Howard as Cousin Devin
- Rumer Willis as Lisa
- Dan Auerbach as himself
- Patrick Carney as himself
- Bruce McCulloch as Judge Darren Tibbles
- William Atherton as Thor Holmvik
- Dana DeLorenzo as Hot Court Reporter
- Jonathan Goldstein as Father
- Kevin Hart as Kevin
- Helena Mattsson as Eve
- Jean Villepique as Vanessa Korson
- Tim Heidecker as Reverend Troy
- Hawthorne James as Bus Driver
- Zane Holtz as Lance
- Sarah Stouffer as Kim
- Sean Clements as Fritz
- Tommy Snider as Fratty Dude
- Edward Barbanell as Bradley Murphy
- Alex Borstein as Colleen Walker
- Robert Englund as Dr. TelAmeriCorp
- Daniel Stern as Travis Rockne
- Tyler Posey as Billy Belk
- Charlie Saxton as Jerry Jaeger
- Mark L. Young as Simon
- Zack Pearlman as Pete
- Lauren Powers as Muscle Babe
- Ryan Lee as Shame
- Aidan Gould as Chargonius
- Sally Kellerman as Peggy
- Lisa Loeb as Lisa
- Jordan Peele as Mark
- Mickey Jones as Arthur
- Angela Trimbur as Jenny
- Josh Brener as Marshall Davis
- Adam Ray as Mark McGrath Dude
- Tom Green as Himself

== Production ==
On October 25, 2011, Comedy Central renewed Workaholics for a third season at the time the show's second season was still airing. Shortly after the season was finished filming, actor Jesse Hudson, who plays co-worker Jet Set, died on December 14, 2012.

== Episodes ==
No. overall	No. in season	Title	Directed by	Written by	Original release date	Prod. code	US viewers (millions)
21	1	"The Business Trip"	Kyle Newacheck	Craig Digregorio	May 29, 2012	303	2.11
The guys prepare their house for their first time doing LSD, but Anders is called away on a business trip at a swanky hotel to meet a client named "The Barracuda". Blake and Adam find their way into Anders' room and get everyone in the group to drop acid, including Alice and Anders' client.
22	2	"True Dromance"	Tristram Shapeero	Sean Clements & Dominic Dierkes	June 5, 2012	302	1.51
The three are getting excited for a pizza-eating contest. They cannot get in contact with their drug dealer, Karl, and Adam suggests they go to a tattoo parlor to search for a new drug dealer. After Adam gets his belly button pierced, a tattoo artist, Lisa (Rumer Willis) becomes their new dealer. Karl comes over later and becomes offended when he learns they bought weed from someone else. The guys spend more time with Lisa and even get to meet Lori Beth Denberg. Trouble arises when Lisa brings the guys their bill. They get threatened by Lisa's boss Cortez, who turns out to be Karl. He is upset and threatens to give up drug dealing and go to college. The gang wins free pizza for life at the pizza-eating contest and gives the prize to Karl to make up for everything.
23	3	"Fat Cuz"	Kyle Newacheck	Anders Holm	June 12, 2012	301	1.25
Ders, Adam and Blake forget that TelAmeriCorp changed offices, and they arrive to work late after trashing the old office. At the new office, they cannot find a parking space and complain to Alice that there is no need for two handicap spaces. Adam suggests they bring his disabled cousin, Devin, to come work with them so they can use his handicap parking pass. Though he is reluctant, Devin's mother forces him to take the job. At work, he eats Montez's yogurt and hits it off with Jillian. Devin saves Anders from getting hit by a truck.
24	4	"To Kill a Chupacabraj"	Kyle Newacheck & Tristram Shapeero	Bill Krebs	June 19, 2012	305	1.46
The three roommates try to get ready for a summer party. Blake unclogs the drain in the pool and discovers a dead dog, which he claims is "Rancho Chupacabraj" and carries it around in a backpack. They go to Montez's garage sale for pool toys and wind up purchasing a hovercraft, which they soon learn does not work. They take Montez to small-claims court over the matter.
25	5	"Good Mourning"	Tristram Shapeero	Kyle Newacheck	June 26, 2012	304	1.60
The three discover one of their coworkers, "Homegirl", has died at work. They try to get out of work for the day by claiming how "butt-hurt" they are, but are unsuccessful. Instead, Alice agrees they may hold a service for "Homegirl". Meanwhile, Anders is trying to entertain his female pen pal and her friend. The memorial service turns into a battle between Adam, Anders and Blake in attempts to woo the girls.
26	6	"The Meat Jerking Beef Boys"	Eric Appel	Sean Clements, Dominic Dierkes & Bill Krebs	July 3, 2012	306	1.41
Anders is worried about his father visiting because he has been lying about his life to him. He attempts to cover it up by squatting in a nicer home down the street. At the same time, Adam and Blake have started to make their own jerky by cutting up an entire cow in the house. They are upset with Anders because he is upset with them.
27	7	"The Lord's Force"	John Fortenberry	Blake Anderson	July 10, 2012	307	1.49
Adam gets inspired to join a religious strong-man group called "The Lord's Force." The three meet two of the strong men and convince them to go out for a drink with them. Trouble arises, however, when the men's manager (Tim Heidecker) catches them kissing and kicks them out of the group. The three feel responsible and invite the two to stay with them. They try to start a rival strong-man group called "The Gaylords' Force".
28	8	"Real Time"	Kyle Newacheck	Kevin Etten	July 17, 2012	308	1.18
The gang leaves a series of angry voicemails for Alice on her work phone. They realize their mistake and try to beat her to work to delete them, but soon find out they are still drunk. They continue drinking to avoid a hangover on their way to the office. Part of the episode spoofs the film Speed and even features the bus driver from the film as the bus driver in the episode.
29	9	"Ders Comes in Handy"	Chris Koch	Ryan Koh	July 24, 2012	309	1.54
When Montez suspects that his wife Colleen is cheating on him, the guys help him find the culprit, until they found out that she and Montez made a deal.
30	10	"Flashback in the Day"	Kyle Newacheck	Adam DeVine	July 31, 2012	310	1.34
The episode takes place in a flashback when the three met during college, with Blake and Adam as freshman roommates and Anders as their resident advisor. Adam and Blake get Anders kicked off the swim team, which leads to their first bonding moments over beers. They decide to throw a pool party and Karl in a spoof scene similar to Good Will Hunting. After the party gets busted, the three get kicked off campus and search for jobs. They turn down offers from their future employer, Alice, at the TelAmeriCorp booth.
31	11	"Booger Nights"	Jay Karas	Kevin Etten	January 16, 2013	314	1.72
The guys are determined to be the funniest at the office roast, though no one else believes they are funny. The gang hatches up a clever plan, but then it goes way too far as Bill takes the whole office hostage. Montez becomes closer with Waymond and Jet Set.
32	12	"A TelAmerican Horror Story"	Kyle Newacheck	Sean Clements & Dominic Dierkes	January 23, 2013	311	1.38
After an evening of no sleep because of a movie marathon, Adam is having a tough time in the office while preparing for the "super moon" with Ders. Things get spooky when the guys discover a former employee may be haunting the office. The group finds a creepy painting of the former employee that keeps showing up throughout the office during renovations.
33	13	"Alice Quits"	Kyle Newacheck	Anders Holm	January 30, 2013	313	1.30
After letting the gang play with guns in the office, Alice is reprimanded to the point that she decides to quit. She is quickly replaced with Travis (Daniel Stern), a crazy boss who forces the gang to take their penises out to prove their manhood. The guys must come up with a plan to get Alice back after their new boss forces them to sit at separate desks.
34	14	"Fourth and Inches"	Kyle Newacheck	Sean Clements & Dominic Dierkes	February 6, 2013	315	1.59
After seeing Jillian's star running back cousin Billy play a game, the dudes become obsessed with betting on high-school sports. They approach a group of students who are the official bookies of the school and make bets on all kinds of sports, but lose all their money. The gang bets against Billy's team and tries to get him drunk the night before a game in order to make all their money back.
35	15	"Webcam Girl"	Christian Hoffman	John Carcieri	February 13, 2013	312	1.30
Alone on Valentine's Day, the guys turn to a webcam girl for romance. All three wind up falling in love with the girl. The guys then find out her IP address so they can find her and rescue her from her webcam life. The guys show up to the address and things get crazy.
36	16	"High Art"	Ben Berman	Sean Clements & Dominic Dierkes	February 20, 2013	316	1.17
The gang tries to become rich inventors when an old college classmate opens a club and invites them to come. Ders and Adam alter their appearance to make themselves more marketable, while Blake refuses to change his looks. Adam dismisses Blake's idea for an unburnable flag, so Blake joins a teenage art collective with Karl. Adam and Ders pitch the unburnable flag idea to their old buddy, with extreme consequences.
37	17	"The Worst Generation"	Ben Berman	Tony Goodman & Steven White	February 27, 2013	318	1.09
Adam dislocates both of his shoulders after making a workout video with him lifting massive tires. So the guys visit a retirement home and meet Adam's grandfather, in an attempt to get Adam put back on his grandfather's health insurance plan. Blake befriends on old guitar-playing resident, and Ders is looking for a "True Life" cast.
38	18	"Hungry Like the Wolf Dog"	Kyle Newacheck	Craig Digregorio	March 6, 2013	317	1.23
After seeing a commercial about a blind woman who makes the best breakfast burritos only 100 miles away, the dudes go on a midnight road trip for the ultimate breakfast burrito. They rope Jillian into driving and are meaner than usual to her. Jillian and Blake wind up connecting, but it gets a little weird.
39	19	"In Line"	Rob Schrab	Adam Devine	March 13, 2013	319	1.21
Blake is desperate to get a new video game at midnight and has Adam stand in line for him, but he gets lost on the way to the video store and winds up in a line for clean needles. Blake gets off work and can't find Adam, so he gets in line where he gets into a fight, causing a riot and the game release to be delayed.
40	20	"The Future Is Gnar"	Kyle Newacheck	Blake Anderson	March 20, 2013	320	1.24
When Alice introduces an automated calling system, Blake imagines a future where the machines have taken over. The trio is the last of the workers not turned into cyborgs and must fight, in odd ways, not to be turned into one.
