= Workaholics season 6 =

Workaholics
- Season 6
- DVD cover
- No. of episodes: 10

Release
- Original network: Comedy Central
- Original release: January 14 – March 17, 2016

Season chronology
- ← Previous; Season 5 Next → Season 7

The sixth season of Workaholics premiered on Comedy Central on January 14, 2016, and concluded on March 17, 2016, with a total of 10 episodes.

== Cast ==
=== Main ===
==== Starring ====
- Blake Anderson as Blake Henderson
- Adam DeVine as Adam DeMamp
- Anders Holm as Anders "Ders" Holmvik

==== Also starring ====
- Jillian Bell as Jillian Belk (Note: Bell is only credited for the episodes in which she appears.)
- Erik Griffin as Montez Walker (Note: Only credited for the episodes in which he appears.)
- Maribeth Monroe as Alice Murphy (Note: Monroe is only credited for the episodes in which she appears.)

=== Recurring ===
- Kyle Newacheck as Karl Hevacheck
- Bill Stevenson as Bill
- Waymond Lee as Waymond
- Didi Tillson as Didi
- Gil Harris as Gil

=== Guest ===
- Liam Hemsworth as Cushing Ward
- Dane Cook as JP Richman
- Pauly Shore as himself
- Andy Dick as Mr. Buckley
- Scott Menville as Shane
- Alexandra Daddario as Donna
- Esther Povitsky as Jordana
- Sarah Baker as Sara
- Zoe Jarman as Zoey
- Stephen Root as Carty
- Alex Borstein as Colleen Walker
- Brittany Snow as Erin Mantini
- Clark Duke as Trilly Zane
- Rizwan Manji as Saul Kingston
- Andrew Leeds as Dan
- Whitney Cummings as Juliette
- Jeremy Ratchford as Frank
- Rob Corddry as Eric
- Rob Huebel as Sam
- Matt Besser as Dan Yella

== Production ==
On July 9, 2015, Comedy Central renewed Workaholics for a sixth and seventh season respectively.

== Episodes ==
No. overall	No. in season	Title	Directed by	Written by	Original release date	Prod. code	US viewers (millions)
67	1	"Wolves of Rancho"	Adam DeVine	Kevin Etten	January 14, 2016	606	0.65
The guys transfer to a different branch of TelAmeriCorp to work for a new boss.
68	2	"Meth Head Actor"	Kyle Newacheck	Ben Rodgers	January 21, 2016	607	0.61
Adam, Blake, and Ders attend a Narcotics Anonymous meeting.
69	3	"Save the Cat"	Christian Hoffman	Anders Holm	January 28, 2016	602	0.51
After Blake and Jillian adopt a cat, things take an unexpected turn.
70	4	"Death of a Salesdude"	Anders Holm	Sarah Peters & Zoe Jarman	February 4, 2016	601	0.51
TelAmeriCorp begins selling female-friendly products, and the women of the office take over.
71	5	"Gone Catfishing"	Kyle Newacheck	Scotty Landes	February 11, 2016	605	0.55
As 420 approaches, Blake meets a woman online, but Adam and Ders are convinced that he's being catfished.
72	6	"Going Viral"	Kyle Newacheck	Alex Blagg	February 18, 2016	604	0.54
Adam, Blake and Ders try to become social media stars.
73	7	"Night at the Dudeseum"	Adam Newacheck	Jen D'Angelo	February 25, 2016	608	0.58
On Ders Day, the guys wreak havoc in a museum.
74	8	"The Fabulous Murphy Sisters"	Kevin Etten	John Quaintance & Scotty Landes	March 3, 2016	610	0.44
Alice's sister visits the TelAmeriCorp office. Show ends with "to be contindude...", but never does.
75	9	"Always Bet on Blake"	Kyle Newacheck	Blake Anderson	March 10, 2016	609	0.48
Adam, Blake, and Ders open a casino in their house.
76	10	"The Nuttin' Professor"	Kyle Newacheck	John Quaintance	March 17, 2016	603	0.48
Adam, Blake and Ders make a pact not to ejaculate until they acquire a copy of "The Nuttin' Professor".
