= Workaholics season 1 =

Workaholics
- Season 1
- DVD cover
- No. of episodes: 10

Release
- Original network: Comedy Central
- Original release: April 6 – June 8, 2011

Season chronology
- Next → Season 2

The first season of Workaholics debuted on Comedy Central on April 6, 2011, and concluded on June 8, 2011, with a total of 10 episodes.

In 2020, the episode "To Friend a Predator" was pulled from reruns on the network and the streaming platforms, Amazon Prime Video, Hulu and Paramount+, due to its premise and featuring the aforementioned episode's guest star, Chris D'Elia in the wake of misconduct allegations surrounding him.

== Cast ==
=== Main ===
- Blake Anderson as Blake Henderson
- Adam DeVine as Adam DeMamp
- Anders Holm as Anders "Ders" Holmvik
- Jillian Bell as Jillian Belk (Note: Bell originally guest starred in the pilot before she was promoted to series regular for the episodes in which she is credited.)
- Maribeth Monroe as Alice Murphy (Note: Monroe originally guest starred in the pilot before she was promoted to series regular for the episodes in which she is credited.)

=== Recurring ===
- Erik Griffin as Montez Walker (Note: Also has an uncredited role in "In the Line of Getting Fired".)
- Kyle Newacheck as Karl Hevacheck
- Eric Price as Brett
- Dan Lippert as Corey
- Jesse Hudson as Jet Set
- Waymond Lee as Waymond

=== Guest ===
- Brian Huskey as Robbie
- Brandon Soo Hoo as Punk Kid
- Marc Summers as himself
- Ally Maki as Brenanda
- Tom Virtue as Client
- Mel Rodriguez as Ryan
- Edward Barbanell as Bradley
- Clint Howard as Dean
- Rance Howard as Jerry
- Rebel Wilson as Big Money Hustla
- Laurel Coppock as Meegan
- Chris D'Elia as Topher
- Jennifer Lyons as Jess
- Laura Kightlinger as Sharon
- Chris Parnell as Bruce Benson
- Reggie Brown as Barack Obama
- Jefandi Cato as Michelle Obama
- Olen Holm as Jason Statham

== Production ==
Prior to the series debut on April 6, 2011, "In the Line of Getting Fired", originally aired as a special sneak peek on March 15, 2011, immediately following the Comedy Central Roast of Donald Trump, and was never re-aired until its official debut on June 8, 2011, when it served as the season finale. That episode was watched in 1.36 million U.S. households but the ratings for the March 15 sneak peek were never released.

== Episodes ==
No. overall	No. in season	Title	Directed by	Written by	Original release date	Prod. code	US viewers (millions)
1	1	"Pilot: Piss & Shit"	Kyle Newacheck	Blake Anderson, Adam Devine, Anders Holm, Kyle Newacheck, Connor Pritchard & Dominic Russo	April 6, 2011	101	1.10
After Adam and Blake prank Ders into texting a nude picture to everyone, Ders smokes marijuana after his humiliation. The next day, they find out that a company drug test is being issued and the three men have to figure out how to pass it. Their remedies include bribery, over-the-counter medication and finally sabotage.
2	2	"We Be Ballin'"	Kyle Newacheck	Blake Anderson	April 13, 2011	102	1.05
When Adam's "third love" shows up at a party, he wants to do anything to impress her, including falsely claiming to have season tickets for the Los Angeles Clippers. The men struggle to figure out how to obtain tickets, and eventually find out that their coworker Montez can get them. After some hijinks ensue, the boys are ultimately unable to get the tickets and are stranded at the Staples Center when the girls kick them out of the car. Marc Summers makes a guest appearance as himself.
3	3	"Office Campout"	Chris Koch	Adam Devine	April 20, 2011	103	0.94
When the house needs to be fumigated because of a cockroach infestation, the men camp out in the office, since they have nowhere else to stay. While at the office, they take psilocybin mushrooms and begin to party. Their fun is cut short, though, when burglars break into the office. They find out that the 'burglars' are actually tech support guys, and they share the mushrooms with them.
4	4	"The Promotion"	Chris Koch	Kevin Etten & Anders Holm	April 27, 2011	104	1.44
A prank war between Adam and Blake against Ders gets out of hand when a promotion is on the line. When Adam and Blake sabotage Ders' chance for the promotion, Ders tells them that he is going to move out of the house and tells them he does not want to be friends with them anymore. After Adam and Blake realize how sorry they are, they talk to their boss and put in a good word for Ders. After Ders tells the other two that he got the promotion, he reveals that he was never really going to move out. He then goes on to take advantage of his higher position in the office by bossing everyone around. When Adam and Blake get tired of this treatment, they proceed to get him drunk and make him late to work the next morning by putting a bike lock around his neck, which gets Ders demoted.
5	5	"Checkpoint Gnarly"	Kyle Newacheck	Leila Strachan	May 4, 2011	105	1.45
Adam, Blake and Ders meet Alice's brother Bradley (Edward Barbanell) at work and agree to take him out for a night on the town. After getting drunk, they head back to the house to hang out, but are stopped at a DUI checkpoint. They flee the car, but Bradley is left in the trunk after having jumped in after stealing beer from a convenience store. When trying to get Bradley out of the trunk at the impound lot after breaking into the lot, they see that he is no longer in the trunk. After getting caught by a member of staff, Bradley - dressed in Blake's strip cop uniform - pretends to be a police officer. Bradley takes the car, along with Adam, Blake and Ders.
6	6	"The Strike"	Chris Koch	Brian Keith Etheridge & David King	May 11, 2011	106	1.35
When they want to celebrate "Half-Christmas", Adam, Blake and Ders ask Alice for two days of vacation. After being turned down and told to take down their decorations, Adam and Blake decide to go on strike, and are replaced, leaving Ders on his own with them annoying him. After the whole office goes on strike, Ders is left to run the whole office with his boss and the two replacements. After learning that the company calls people listed on the "do not call" list, Anders moves to side with the strikers, leading Alice to allow the employees to have two paid vacation days a year as well as a "Half-Christmas" party.
7	7	"Straight Up Juggahos"	Kyle Newacheck	Kevin Etten	May 18, 2011	107	1.49
The guys set Jillian up on a blind date with a man they find on a dating site, to keep her from accompanying them to a wine-and-cheese gathering for young professionals. After getting a call from Jillian asking Blake to come get her, the guys leave the party to go find her at a Juggalo music festival. But once they get there, they realize that the festival offered more to them than the party did. Anders gets a business buddy, Adam finds a girl (Rebel Wilson) and Blake finds somewhere to fit in.
8	8	"To Friend a Predator"	Kyle Newacheck	Anders Holm	May 25, 2011	108	1.51
After Ders accidentally sends Karl to jail, the three decide to bust a certain child molester on Blake's Justin Bieber fan club site. When the guy, Topher (Chris D'Elia), comes over to the house, they realize that he is pretty cool and end up hanging out with him. They then find out that he has access to the "Penthouse Penthouse".
9	9	"Muscle I'd Like to Flex"	Chris Koch	Kyle Newacheck	June 1, 2011	109	1.65
While practicing for a Renaissance fair performance, Adam meets an older, richer woman named Sharon, who asks him to move in with her. When the boys come to visit Adam, Blake finds out that Adam is training for a bodybuilding competition. After Adam thinks Ders is trying to steal Sharon, they fight and Ders and Blake try to get on in life without Adam. After that fails, they decide they need a new roommate, and Blake invites Karl to move in. The guys go to Adam's competition to get their music back, but when the audience starts laughing at him, Blake and Ders join Adam on stage to do their Renaissance fair rap.
10	10	"In the Line of Getting Fired"	Kyle Newacheck	Kevin Etten & Anders Holm	June 8, 2011	110	1.36
After accidentally hitting a guy with their car on their way to work, the guys learn that the CEO is at the office. When they see him, they realize that he is the guy they hit. When the CEO asks them to come to lunch with him, he offers them $10,000 to kill him. Trying to make him find a reason to live, the three throw a party for him. But their plan backfires, when the CEO announces that instead of wanting to die, he is going to liquidate the company.
