= Workaholics season 2 =

Workaholics
- Season 2
- DVD cover
- No. of episodes: 10

Release
- Original network: Comedy Central
- Original release: September 20 – November 22, 2011

Season chronology
- ← Previous; Season 1 Next → Season 3

The second season of Workaholics debuted on Comedy Central on September 20, 2011, and concluded on November 22, 2011, with a total of 10 episodes.

== Cast ==
=== Main ===
==== Starring ====
- Blake Anderson as Blake Henderson
- Adam DeVine as Adam DeMamp
- Anders Holm as Anders "Ders" Holmvik

==== Also starring ====
- Jillian Bell as Jillian Belk (Note: Bell is only credited for the episodes in which she appears.)
- Erik Griffin as Montez Walker (Note: Only credited for the episodes in which he appears.)
- Maribeth Monroe as Alice Murphy (Note: Monroe is only credited for the episodes in which she appears.)

==== Recurring ====
- Kyle Newacheck as Karl Hevacheck
- Bill Stevenson as Bill
- Jesse Hudson as Jet Set
- Waymond Lee as Waymond

=== Guest ===
- Tyler the Creator as Student Defacing Car
- John P. Farley as Principal Senn
- Charlie Saxton as Jerry
- Steven Krueger as Quaid Franklin
- Lavell Crawford as Cheesy Eggs Guy
- Mitchell Hurwitz as Cool Eric
- Nicky Whelan as Naomi
- Ray Wise as Kyle Walsh
- Lee Weaver as Tim
- Gary Anthony Williams as Craig
- Ian Roberts as Cal
- Katherine Narducci as Maria
- Eric Edelstein as Security Guard
- Katee Sackhoff as Rachel
- Carla Gallo as Bunny
- Hana Mae Lee as Hannah
- Kyle Kinane as Sewer Dwayne
- Jeff Fahey as Doug
- Joel McKinnon Miller as Head Cop
- Lurie Poston as Damien Carmichael
- Lori Alan as Betsy Russ
- Pete Gardner as Dale Carmichael
- Marc Evan Jackson as Gerald

== Production ==
Comedy Central renewed Workaholics for a 10-episode second season on May 4, 2011.

== Episodes ==
No. overall	No. in season	Title	Directed by	Written by	Original release date	Prod. code	US viewers (millions)
11	1	"Heist School"	Tristram Shapeero	Kevin Etten	September 20, 2011	203	2.13
After the boys find out that their income taxes are helping to pay for the playground they're sitting in, they decide that the playground belongs to them. They then steal a dragon statue, believing it is theirs because of their taxes paid. After the statue (named "Reptar" by Adam, "Cee Lo Green" by Blake, and "Ivan Dragon" by Ders) is stolen by local teenagers, the boys decide to disguise themselves as high-school students and steal it back. Tyler The Creator and Taco Bennett of Odd Future make cameo appearances.
12	2	"Dry Guys"	Kyle Newacheck	Kyle Newacheck	September 27, 2011	201	1.77
After a long night of hard partying, the guys decide to test sobriety. But Adam finds this to be too challenging and he finds ways to cheat. Alice suggests that the boys go to counseling for their substance abuse (with the counselor "Cool Eric").
13	3	"Temp-Tress"	Kyle Newacheck	Anders Holm	October 4, 2011	202	1.71
The boys want to host a party for WrestleMania XXVIII but discover that their TV is broken. While at work they learn that the company is giving away a refrigerator with a built-in TV to the first person to get 20 sales. Meanwhile, a beautiful new Australian girl (Nicky Whelan) is temping at TelAmeriCorp. While trying not to be distracted by her beauty, the boys have to deal with Montez, who is making many sales.
14	4	"Model Kombat"	Tristram Shapeero	David King	October 11, 2011	205	1.98
Blake becomes obsessed with the house PlayStation while preparing for a video-game competition. He barely makes it to work and he doesn't shower. Meanwhile, Adam learns that Alice is single and he tries to seduce her. Alice tells him that the company website needs a new male model. This starts a competition between Adam and Ders for the job.
15	5	"Old Man Ders"	Kyle Newacheck	Scott Rutherford	October 18, 2011	206	1.98
Ders is turning 25 and he's not happy about it. As Blake and Adam wake Ders up for their annual booze-a-thon, they find out Ders can't handle his liquor intake anymore. While the boys treat Ders like he's an old man, Ders has decided to act younger than ever.
16	6	"Stop! Pajama Time"	Kyle Newacheck	Blake Anderson	October 25, 2011	207	1.65
When Alice tries to get the entire gang to take a photo in onesies for a client, she gets sick and puts Jillian in charge of the office. The workers go crazy, play craps and drink alcohol. Jillian then finds out that Alice is about to fire four people. When she tells the gang what she has found out, things get really crazy.
17	7	"Teenage Mutant Ninja Roommates"	Kyle Newacheck	Leila Strachan	November 1, 2011	208	2.16
The boys go to Montez's gated neighborhood for a party. When a soapbox derby car crash happens, the boys are on the run from the neighborhood security. When they hide in the sewer, they realize they're in a stinky situation (literally).
18	8	"Karl's Wedding"	Jay Karas	Kevin Etten	November 8, 2011	209	1.82
Karl is getting married in five hours to a woman named Hannah. Anders' new flame Bonnie wants to help. While the boys are helping with the wedding, Adam tries to find a date. When this fails, he ends up finding a homeless woman, (Katee Sackhoff), as a date.
19	9	"Man Up"	Kyle Newacheck	Anders Holm	November 15, 2011	210	1.67
After letting Jillian save them from a bully, with Adam crying afterward, the boys realize they are the least manly men in the universe. To reclaim their manhood, the boys go on a "man trip".
20	10	"6 Hours Till Hedonism II"	Kyle Newacheck	Adam DeVine	November 22, 2011	204	1.48
For Thanksgiving, the boys are going to the Hedonism II sex resort in Jamaica. When Blake forgets his passport, the boys have only six hours to come up with a plan for another one. Luckily, Karl knows someone who could help them.
