= Gabriel Hammond =

American financial executive

Gabriel Arce Hammond is an American financial executive, and serial entrepreneur. He is currently the founder and CEO of Emles Advisors LLC, an asset management firm.

== Early life and education ==
Hammond grew up in Potomac, Maryland, a suburb of Washington, D.C. He has a brother, Daniel. Hammond graduated from Johns Hopkins. Hammond also graduated from the Mercersburg Academy. He is pursuing his PhD in Psychology at Harvard University.

== Career ==
After graduating from Johns Hopkins, Hammond began his career at Goldman Sachs & Co in the Energy & Power Group within the Equity Research Division, before founding Alerian Capital Management, LLC, in 2004, the first and leading energy infrastructure data and analytics company to create investment vehicles in the Master Limited Partnerships (MLP) asset class. Alerian is most known for creating the Alerian MLP Index, the benchmark index for MLPs in the energy infrastructure industry.

In 2009, Hammond created the SteelPath MLP Funds, an energy infrastructure mutual fund family focused on the MLP asset class, creating the first MLP open-ended funds. The funds provided investors access, liquidity, and transparency in energy infrastructure through the MLP asset class. Hammond served as the Chief Executive Officer, President and Portfolio Manager of SteelPath before he sold the SteelPath mutual funds family to Oppenheimer Funds in 2012, with assets under management of $3.3 billion at the time of sale. In December 2012 OppenheimerFunds, Inc. acquired SteelPath, which had $3.3 billion in assets under management.

In 2007, Hammond and Alerian launched what would become the J.P. Morgan Alerian MLP Index ETN (Ticker: AMJ), the first passively managed MLP exchange-traded product to track the Alerian Index. In 2010, Hammond launched the Alerian MLP ETF (Ticker: AMLP), the first MLP exchange-traded fund, which has become the largest publicly available MLP investment product. Total assets under management linked to the Alerian Index series exceeded $17 billion by 2015. In July 2018 Hammond sold the company to a group reportedly financed by his old employer, Goldman Sachs.

In 2012, Hammond became a 49% owner of Ace Distributing, a beverage distribution company located in southern central Pennsylvania, where has supported management through its technology initiatives and transformative acquisition. In 2017, Hammond also enabled Ace’s transformative acquisition of a competing distributor, W&L, which doubled the number of cases sold and increased Ace’s market share in its territories to more than 60 percent. In 2019, Hammond founded Hammond Beverage Group to build upon the success of Ace and its strong management team.

In 2019, Hammond founded Emles Advisors LLC, an asset management firm.

== Film distributor ==
In 2013, Gabriel Hammond produced Learning to Drive, directed by Isabel Coixet, with his brother Daniel Hammond. The film stars Patricia Clarkson, Ben Kingsley, Jake Weber, and Sarita Choudhury and won the audience award at the Provincetown International Film Festival and People’s Choice Award at the Toronto International Film Festival. He also produced Break Point, a film starring Jeremy Sisto, David Walton, Amy Smart, and J.K. Simmons. In 2014 he established Broad Green Pictures with his brother Daniel Hammond. The company was originally set up as a production company, but the brothers realized that in order to keep control of the film, it was necessary to handle the distribution internally and began building the production company into a fully integrated studio.

After nearly thirty films, Broad Green Pictures stopped distributing movies in 2018. The studio’s library of films includes A Walk in the Woods, Knight of Cups, The Infiltrator, Bad Santa 2 (a co-production with Miramax), along with both Terrence Malick’s Voyage of Time and Song to Song.

Gabriel Hammond is a member of the Producers Guild of America.
