= Hollywood Handbook =

Comedy podcast

- Genre: Comedy, satire
- Language: English

Cast and voices
- Hosted by: Sean Clements; Hayes Davenport

Music
- Theme music composed by: Annaliese Schiersch

Production
- Length: 45–90 minutes

Technical specifications
- Audio format: MP3

Publication
- No. of episodes: 658 (as of July 8, 2026)
- Original release: October 8, 2013
- Provider: Earwolf (2013–2020); independent (2021–2023); Headgum (2023–2026); iHeartMedia (2026-present)
- Updates: Weekly

Related
- Related shows: Hollywood Handbook: The Pro Version
- Website: www.iheart.com/podcast/143-hollywood-handbook-28528674/

Hollywood Handbook is a weekly comedy podcast hosted by Hayes Davenport and Sean Clements. Episodes generally consist of Davenport, Clements, and a guest offering advice, telling stories, and doing segments, in a satirical, absurdist manner. Guests included Donald Glover, Ellie Kemper, Aubrey Plaza, Kumail Nanjiani, Nick Kroll, Patton Oswalt, Wayne Brady, Ayo Edebiri, Jon Hamm, and Sharon Horgan. The show has been described as "essentially a mockery of entertainment niceties — with Clements (mischievous, smirking) and Davenport (droll, unamused) taunting industry bigwigs [...] about whatever projects they are promoting, all while pleading to be involved with them".

== Background ==
Clements and Davenport met while writing on the Fox program Allen Gregory, where they established a friendship and established the Reality Show Show podcast on the Earwolf Network. The podcast featured the duo, alongside reality stars such as Survivor winner John Cochran or comedians like Paul F. Tompkins and Anders Holm, humorously analyzing reality shows such as The Challenge, World's Worst Tenants, and Splash.

Due to the show's small audience and the hosts' growing disinterest with the premise, Clements and Davenport ended the Reality Show Show after 39 episodes. Two weeks later, on October 8, 2013, the first episode of Hollywood Handbook was released with guest Jake Johnson. In Hollywood Handbook, the hosts play highly-successful versions of themselves, presenting the podcast as "an insider's guide to kicking butt and dropping names in the red-carpet-lined back hallways of this industry we call showbiz". Initially, the show consisted of Clements and Davenport doing segments such as "The Teaser Freezer", wherein they would comment on a trailer for an upcoming movie, followed by an interview with the guest which included audience questions during the "Popcorn Gallery" segment. In recent years, however, the show has adopted a much looser format, featuring less planned segments and more interactions with the guests and Earwolf staff.

In December 2020, it was announced that Hollywood Handbook would be leaving Earwolf at the end of the year to go independent on Patreon. From January 2021, the episodes will be posted as part of the Patreon for the podcast The Flagrant Ones, which is co-hosted by Clements and Davenport. In May 2023 the show became affiliated with the Headgum podcast network, with episode 501 being the first episode released as part of the network.

In March 2026 the show moved to iHeartMedia.

== Reception ==
Hollywood Handbook has been featured on Vulture's best-of comedy podcast list in 2015, 2016, 2017, and 2021, ranking seventh, second, fourth, and fifth, respectively. On the 2021 list, it was recognized together with the other podcasts of The Flagrant Ones Patreon. In 2019, Vulture recognized two episodes of Hollywood Handbook as some of the "best episodes of the year". Hollywood Handbook also ranked third on Paste's 2017 list of the best comedy podcasts of the year. In The A.V. Club's 2015 reader's poll, the show was voted the second best podcast of 2015, and one of its episodes was voted the third best podcast episode of the year.

In 2020, Hollywood Handbook received an iHeartRadio Podcast Award nomination for "Best Ad Read".

Writer and critic Nathan Rabin has written many articles for Vulture and The A.V. Club about episodes of the show, praising one as "anti-comedy for the ages".

In a 2023 profile of Davenport and Clements on Vulture, the show was described as "one of the great impossible-to-explainers in modern comedy, a shaggy, shape-shifting improv machine heavy with fan-maintained lore and nonsense inside jokes".

Notable fans and guests of the show include Tom Scharpling, Paul F. Tompkins, Julie Klausner, Paul Scheer, Beck Bennett, and Kyle Mooney.

== Spin-offs ==
On June 14, 2017, Clements, Brett Morris, and actor and comedian Ben Rodgers launched the first season of the Stitcher Premium series Hollywood Masterclass which satirizes MasterClass lectures. The show's second season began August 29, 2018. A third season consisting of eight episodes premiered on August 30, 2021.

On January 31, 2018, Clements and Davenport launched Hollywood Handbook: The Pro Version, a 30-minute version of the show featuring interactions between the duo and members of the staff such as "Chef Kevin" and "Engineer Brett", as well as segments like the "Teaser Freezer". The show is posted every Wednesday on Stitcher Premium. It was called one of the "best new comedy podcasts of 2018" by Rolling Stone.
