= Bent (TV series) =

- Genre: Sitcom
- Created by: Tad Quill
- Starring: Amanda Peet; David Walton; Jeffrey Tambor; Margo Harshman; Joey King; Pasha D. Lychnikoff; J.B. Smoove; Jesse Plemons
- Composer: Gabriel Mann
- Country of origin: United States
- Original language: English
- No. of seasons: 1
- No. of episodes: 6

Production
- Executive producer: Tad Quill
- Producers: Chris Plourde; Michael Pendell
- Camera setup: Single-camera
- Running time: 30 minutes
- Production companies: Quill Entertainment; Universal Television; Open 4 Business Productions

Original release
- Network: NBC
- Release: March 21 – April 4, 2012

Bent is an American romantic sitcom television series that ran on NBC from March 21 to April 4, 2012. The series was created by Tad Quill and stars Amanda Peet as a recently divorced lawyer and David Walton as the irresponsible general contractor hired to remodel her kitchen. Supporting roles are played by Jeffrey Tambor, Margo Harshman, Pasha D. Lychnikoff and Joey King.

On May 11, 2012, NBC cancelled the series after one season.

== Synopsis ==
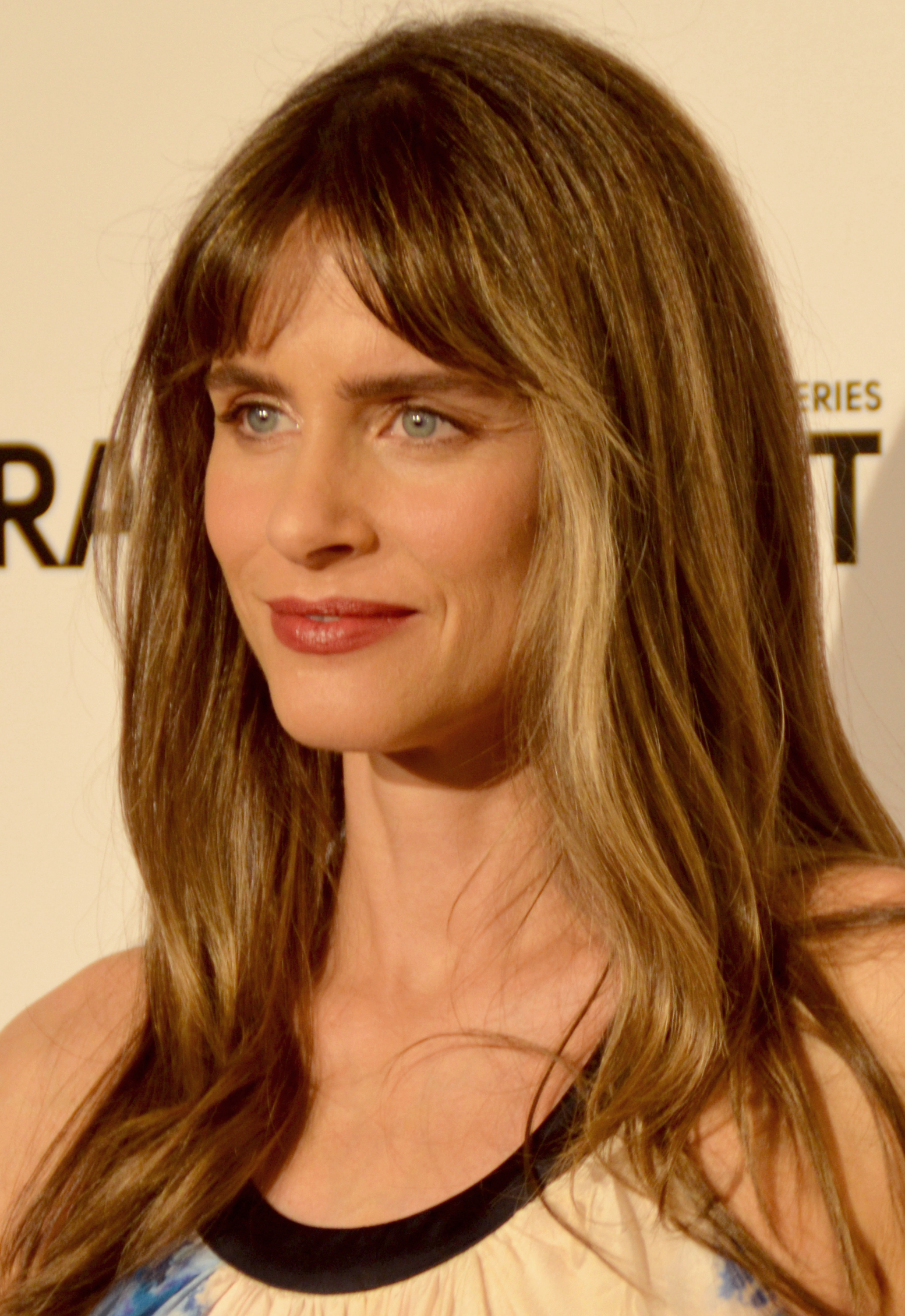
Amanda Peet plays protagonist Alex, a recently divorced, no-nonsense lawyer

Recently divorced no-nonsense lawyer Alex (Amanda Peet) hires contractor Pete (David Walton) to renovate her kitchen. An irresponsible womanizer, Pete is trying to rebuild his contracting career after ruining it with his gambling addiction and promiscuous ways. The high-strung Alex, whose husband was sent to prison for insider trading, is trying to maintain a busy work schedule while raising her 8-year-old daughter Charlie (Joey King). Aware of his reputation with women, Alex insists she will fire Pete if he presents any problems. Other cast members include Alex's flirty sister Screwsie (Margo Harshman), Pete's aspiring actor father Walt (Jeffrey Tambor), Charlie's babysitter Simone (Susan Park) and Pete's contractor crew (J.B. Smoove, Jesse Plemons, and Pasha D. Lychnikoff).

== Production ==
Filmed with a single-camera setup, Bent is produced by Universal Television, a production arm of NBC. Tad Quill wrote the pilot episode and served as executive producer based on a two-year deal he signed with the formerly-named Universal Media Studios in 2010. The first episode was directed by Craig Zisk, who previously directed episodes of Weeds and Nurse Jackie.

Amanda Peet said of the show: "I just loved the writing, I thought it was a good repartee. I love a good romantic comedy, and I love a repressed woman who needs to get laid."

== Episodes ==
| No. | Title | Directed by | Written by | Original release date | U.S. viewers (millions) |
|---|---|---|---|---|---|
| 1 | "Pilot" | Craig Zisk | Tad Quill | March 21, 2012 | 2.75 |
Alex, a divorced mother, moves into a smaller house with her eight-year-old daughter, Charlie. Meanwhile, she hires Pete, a gambling addict who is in need of a job, as a contractor to remodel her kitchen.
| 2 | "Smitten" | Marc Buckland | Tad Quill | March 21, 2012 | 2.38 |
Alex wants to take her relationship with her boyfriend Ben (Matt Letscher) to the next level. Meanwhile, Pete attempts to reignite his romance with ex-girlfriend Natalie (Diora Baird).
| 3 | "HD" | Jesse Peretz | Erin Ehrlich | March 28, 2012 | 2.56 |
Discovering Ben is with another woman, Pete decides to tell Alex. Meanwhile, Walt and Screwsie help Charlie with a school bully.
| 4 | "A-Game" | Phil Traill | Aseem Batra | March 28, 2012 | 2.34 |
Alex invites Ben to her boss Bob's (Larry Miller) wedding, but at the last minute Pete replaces Ben as her date.
| 5 | "Mom" | Troy Miller | DJ Nash | April 4, 2012 | 2.27 |
Walter attempts to win back his ex-wife (Marcia Gay Harden). Meanwhile, with Pete absent from work, Alex finds herself getting back into old habits.
| 6 | "Tile Date" | Rob Greenberg | Tad Quill & DJ Nash | April 4, 2012 | 1.93 |
Alex questions her true feelings for Pete during a trip with her boyfriend Ben. Meanwhile, Alex's neighbor Dan (Kyle Bornheimer) threatens Alex with legal action.

== Reception ==
The New York Times liked the show Bent saying it has "witty repartee," an "incongruous edge" and they absolutely enjoyed "the chemistry" between Amanda Peet and David Walton. The NY Times went on to say that Jeffrey Tambor is "hilarious" playing David Walton's Dad, a frustrated actor. The Times commented that if you "[w]atch two episodes, you begin to catch the rhythm; watch four, and you might be hooked.

Daily Variety says Bent is "the kind of charming romantic comedy TV frequently aspires to but seldom delivers." And that Bent is "straight up" worth watching.

The Star Tribune says "Chemistry Sets Bent Afire."

Huffington Post's TV critic says "It's really charming."

TV Guide gives "5 Reasons to Fall for the NBC Romantic Comedy Bent"

"In what might be his best role since Arrested Development, Tambor shines as Pete's dad, Walt" -- TV Guide

Vulture, however, predicted the show's cancellation, noting that "when the romantic relationship is the ONLY source of comedy, it's forced to become so winky and witty that it loses any value as a realistic simulation of actual human behavior".
