= Zombies (2016 film) =

2016 film directed by Hamid Torabpour

- DVD cover
- Directed by: Hamid Torabpour
- Written by: Hamid Torabpour
- Produced by: Cameron Romero; Allan Radel; Todd Randall; Jeff Bruessel; Carla Bruessel; Dave Mcgauvran; Meryl Mcgauvran
- Starring: Tony Todd; Steven Luke; Raina Hein
- Cinematography: Timothy Torabpour; Peter Wigand
- Music by: Jon Oney
- Production companies: Romero Pictures; Schuetzle Company Productions; Winter State Entertainment
- Distributed by: Broad Green Pictures
- Release date: October 21, 2016
- Running time: 85 minutes
- Country: United States
- Language: English

Zombies is a 2016 action horror film written and directed by Hamid Torabpour and starring Tony Todd, Steven Luke and Raina Hein.

The film was released in selected theaters on October 21, 2016 and on digitally on September 29, 2017.

== Plot ==
When a deadly virus decimates Earth, a man and other survivors must utilize weapons to battle rampaging, bloodthirsty zombies.

== Cast ==
- Tony Todd as Detective Sommers
- Steven Luke as Luke
- Raina Hein as Bena
- Amanda Day as Tala
- Aaron Courteau as Marcus
- Marcus Dee as Dave
- Heidi Fellner as Haley
- Todd Vance as Dad
- Jim Westcott as Beaker
- Amber Rhodes as Lily
- Brian Thoe as Shrimp Scampi
- Bruce Miller as Porch Man
- Cameron Cylkowski as Aaron
- Aundrea Smith as Little Girl
- Cody Fleury as Zombie on Stairs
- Lucas Youngerberger as Listening Survivor
