= The Sub =

- Teaser poster
- Directed by: Dan Samiljan
- Written by: Dave Cain; Dan Samiljan
- Produced by: Justin Wagman; Noelle Hubbell
- Starring: Zoe Jarman; Heather Langenkamp; Brian Stepanek; Robbi Morgan
- Cinematography: Devin Doyle
- Edited by: Morgan Pritchard
- Release date: April 20, 2017 (Dead by Dawn)
- Running time: 16 minutes
- Country: United States
- Language: English

The Sub is a 2017 American short horror film directed by Dan Samiljan, co-written by Dave Cain and Samiljan, and produced by Justin Wagman and Noelle Hubbell. The film stars Zoe Jarman, Heather Langenkamp and Brian Stepanek. The film had a successful Kickstarter campaign.

== Plot ==
Mae Zalinski is a 20-something girl who reluctantly takes a job as a substitute teacher at her old rival high school. Mae has her first day as things go from bad to worse as she starts to uncover the strange, possibly evil underbelly of this seemingly perfect high school. From the odd, overly-friendly vice-principal to the Children-of-the-Corn-esque students, Mae is soon in way over her head.

== Cast ==
- Zoe Jarman as Mae Zalinski
- Heather Langenkamp as Senora Babcock
- Brian Stepanek as Coach Forte
- Robbi Morgan as Miss Gormley
- Carrie Wampler as Becky Cumberdale
- Kylee Russell as Penny Petzinger
- John Balma as Mr. Shipley

== Possible feature length film ==
According to the film's Kickstarter campaign, if the short film garners an audience then it could possibly be made into a feature-length film at some point in the future.
