= Hayes Davenport =

American writer, podcast host, and television producer

- Born: March 23, 1986 (age 40); Cambridge, Massachusetts, U.S.
- Education: Harvard University
- Occupations: Writer; comedian; television producer; podcast host
- Notable work: Eastbound & Down; Family Guy; Allen Gregory; Nick Swardson's Pretend Time; Hollywood Handbook
- Spouse: Geneva Robertson-Dworet

Hayes Hamilton Davenport (born March 23, 1986) is an American writer, comedian, television producer, podcast host, and activist. He is best known, along with Sean Clements, as one half of The Boys, the duo who hosts the podcast Hollywood Handbook.

== Early life ==
Davenport grew up in Wellesley, Massachusetts. He participated on his high school's rowing team.

Davenport attended Harvard University, where he graduated with a degree in social studies. He was the editor of the Harvard Lampoon. After graduating, he moved to Los Angeles.

Davenport has appeared as a contestant on the game show Jeopardy!.

== Career ==
Davenport briefly worked at the Game Show Network before being signed by Creative Artists Agency.

He has written for Big Lake, Family Guy, Great News, Eastbound & Down, Allen Gregory, Divorce, and Nick Swardson's Pretend Time. He was a writer for the show Vice Principals. Davenport acts occasionally and has starred in the web series Those People.

Davenport is the host of multiple podcasts, including Hollywood Handbook and The Flagrant Ones. From March 2018 to July 2021, he co-hosted the LA Podcast, together with Scott Frazier and Alisa Walker.

Davenport appeared as a guest on Big Lake marathon fundraiser episode of The George Lucas Talk Show.

== Activism ==
Davenport is a homelessness activist, helping and advocating for people experiencing homelessness. He is on the board of directors of the SELAH Neighborhood Homeless Coalition, a Los Angeles–based non-profit organization he has been volunteering with since 2017, and worked full-time on Nithya Raman's successful 2020 campaign for Los Angeles City Council. Raman is one of the co-founders of SELAH and made the issue of homelessness central to her campaign. After volunteering on the campaign, Davenport started to formally work for Raman as a senior advisor with a special focus on homelessness and housing projects and, as a result, departed as a host of the LA Podcast in July 2021. He left Raman's staff in the fall of 2024, in part because he "feel[s] like it's a good time to start talking again about city stuff, which is harder to do as a city employee". Davenport has talked extensively about housing and homelessness in Los Angeles on his own LA Podcast as well as other podcasts, such as Gimme Shelter: The California Housing Crisis Pod, High and Mighty, and Know Your Enemy. After leaving his job in the city government, he started a blog about Los Angeles politics, Big City Heat, on October 28, 2024, and posted a few articles and a two-part podcast miniseries about the 2024 Los Angeles County elections the following days, advocating in particular an ultimately passed ballot measure that will double the county's existing quarter-cent sales tax to fund homelessness services.
