= Broad Green Pictures =

American film production and distribution company

Broad Green Pictures LLC
- Company type: Private
- Industry: Film
- Founded: 2014; 11 years ago
- Founder: Daniel Hammond; Gabriel Hammond
- Defunct: 2018; 7 years ago
- Fate: Defunct
- Headquarters: Los Angeles, California, U.S.
- Products: Film production; Film distribution
- Subsidiaries: Mister Smith Entertainment (45%)
- Website: broadgreen.com

Broad Green Pictures LLC was an American film production and distribution company. It was founded in 2014 by CEO Gabriel Hammond and Chief Creative Officer, Daniel Hammond.

== History ==
On February 25, 2015, Broad Green Pictures acquired a 45% stake in David Garrett’s London-based sales and distribution outfit, Mister Smith Entertainment. Adam Keen, former VP of Warner Bros. was hired on March 25, 2015 as head of publicity. In April 2015, Christopher Tricario was hired as EVP of business affairs and general counsel. That same month Jeremy Fuchs as the technology officer. In May 2015, Travis Reid was named the president of theatrical distribution. That same month, Dylan Wiley was hired as the president of specialty releasing. In July 2015, Marc Danon joined the company as the president of acquisitions and co-productions, leaving his job as acquisitions and business development senior VP for Lionsgate. On September 3, 2015, Alix Madigan was hired as head of creative affairs, she left Anonymous Content's executive and a staff producer job. She has since left the company, and Broad Green Pictures hired Matt Alvarez as President of Production. Matt Alvarez is a producer of Straight Outta Compton, Ride Along, and Ride Along 2.

In September 2016, Richard Fay was announced to be the head of distribution, replacing Travis Reid who previously resigned.

In 2018, the company was reported to be defunct.

== Films ==
Release date	Title	Notes
June 19, 2015	Eden	
July 10, 2015	10,000 km	
July 24, 2015	Samba	
August 21, 2015	Learning to Drive	
September 2, 2015	A Walk in the Woods	
September 4, 2015	Break Point	
September 25, 2015	99 Homes	
October 23, 2015	I Smile Back	
November 11, 2015	10 Days in a Madhouse	
November 13, 2015	Song of Lahore	
March 4, 2016	Knight of Cups	
April 1, 2016	The Dark Horse	
April 15, 2016	Green Room	produced by; distributed by A24
May 13, 2016	Last Days in the Desert	
June 24, 2016	The Neon Demon	co-distribution with Amazon Studios
July 15, 2016	The Infiltrator	
September 23, 2016	The Dressmaker	co-distribution with Amazon Studios
October 7, 2016	Voyage of Time	co-production with IMAX
November 23, 2016	Bad Santa 2	co-production with Miramax
March 17, 2017	Song to Song	
May 26, 2017	Buena Vista Social Club: Adios	
July 14, 2017	Wish Upon	co-distribution with Orion Pictures
September 8, 2017	The Good Catholic	co-production with Pigasus Pictures
September 29, 2017	Zombies	
November 22, 2017	Just Getting Started	co-production with Entertainment One and Endurance Media
January 19, 2018	Step Sisters	produced by; distributed by Netflix
June 22, 2018	Brain on Fire	produced by; distributed by Netflix
