= Allen Gregory =

American animated sitcom

- Titular character (sitting in chair) with his parents Richard and Jeremy, and his sister Julie.
- Genre: Animated sitcom
- Created by: Jonah Hill; Andrew Mogel; Jarrad Paul
- Voices of: Jonah Hill; French Stewart; Nat Faxon Joy Osmanski; Cristina Pucelli; Will Forte
- Country of origin: United States
- Original language: English
- No. of seasons: 1
- No. of episodes: 7

Production
- Executive producers: Jonah Hill; Andrew Mogel; Jarrad Paul; Peter Chernin; Katherine Pope; David A. Goodman
- Producers: Jonah Hill; Philip Hackinson; Michael Colton
- Running time: 22 minutes
- Production companies: Jonah Hill Films; A J. Paul/A. Mogel/D. Goodman Piece of Business; Chernin Entertainment; 20th Century Fox Television

Original release
- Network: Fox
- Release: October 30 – December 18, 2011

Allen Gregory is an American adult animated sitcom created by Jonah Hill, Jarrad Paul, and Andrew Mogul for Fox. The series follows a pretentious seven-year-old boy named Allen Gregory De Longpre, who, along with his adopted sister Julie, is raised by their two rich fathers, Richard and Jeremy.

The series received generally negative reviews from critics. On January 8, 2012, the series was cancelled after only one season with seven episodes.

== Synopsis ==
The series follows Allen Gregory De Longpre (Jonah Hill), a pretentious seven-year-old raised by his two fathers, Richard and Jeremy. Allen has an adopted sister, Julie. Allen must start attending a public elementary school due to the effect of the recession on his family's finances. Richard also pressures Jeremy to secure employment due to the financial issues, although Richard avoids divulging information to Jeremy as to why they need additional income. Allen is enamored of an elderly school principal, Judith Gottlieb, much to her disapproval. She protests but is forced to accept his behavior due to pressure from the school superintendent, who is friends with Richard.

== Cast ==
- Jonah Hill as Allen Gregory De Longpre, a precocious, pretentious, selfish, and spoiled seven-year-old who is forced to attend elementary school due to the recession. Hill also voices Guilhermo, an overweight Mexican boy.
- French Stewart as Richard De Longpre, Allen's gay father. Richard is the so-called "Super CEO" of De Longpre International, but it turns out to be a fake title his father made up because his son is not capable of running the company. Richard is given fake jobs to be kept busy. Like Allen, Richard's views on the world are warped.
- Nat Faxon as Jeremy De Longpre, Richard's husband. Jeremy is a former social worker who had a loving wife and family, although this changed after Richard became one of his clients. Richard was attracted to Jeremy to the point where he started stalking him and his family until Jeremy finally agreed to be his husband. It is said that Jeremy is not actually attracted to Richard but abandoned his wife and children for him because he offered an easy, no-maintenance life as a trophy husband. He is a nice guy and a bit of a pushover and receives little to no respect from Allen or Richard. However, Allen did thank him at one point for his advice.
- Joy Osmanski as Julie De Longpre, Allen's adopted Cambodian sister. Similar to Jeremy, Julie is constantly abused by both Allen and Richard.
- Cristina Pucelli as Patrick, a student who is Allen's best friend/assistant. He is one of the only kids at school who hangs out with Allen. When Patrick says something, Allen often does not listen unless it plays to his ego.
- Will Forte as Stewart Rossmyre, the school superintendent. He understands Allen's mistakes and often tries to date Allen's first-grade teacher. Forte also voices Ian, one of Allen's classmates, who is often picked on by Joel and the other students because his mom is dead.

=== Supporting cast ===
- Renée Taylor as Judith Gottlieb. The school's elderly principal who Allen is in love with and persistently tries to win her attention, but Judith makes it very clear that she is not interested in a romantic relationship with the child. She once conspired with Julie to get him expelled. Judith is straightforward and has a serious, no-nonsense demeanor. She is in a long-term romantic relationship with Sidney, the school's counselor. They live together and have recently celebrated their 65th anniversary. Sidney has made comments about getting married which she has blown off, though she has referred to their relationship as marriage to herself.
- Leslie Mann as Gina Winthrop, a first-grade teacher who has Allen in her class. She tries to teach Allen, but he continually disrupts the class and shows little to no respect for her or her job.
- Keith David as Carl Trent D'Avis aka Cole Train, an elderly African American man whom Allen comes to when he has a problem, although Carl does not always give the best advice. He has shown violent and destructive tendencies, such as by attacking an unsuspecting diner manager and setting a records hall on fire in the same day.
- Lacey Chabert as Beth, a blonde girl who wears black braces and is best friends with Julie.
- Nasim Pedrad as Val, an overweight Indian girl who is best friends with Julie.
- Jake Johnson as Joel Zadak, the most popular boy at school. Allen tries hard to impress Joel but is mostly made fun of and picked on in return.

=== Guest voices ===
- Lisa Kudrow as Sheila. She appeared in the episode "Mom Sizemore", in which Allen thought she was his biological mother. Allen brought her to live with him and Richard, which forced Jeremy to move out. When she started to get strict with him, Allen realized there was nothing wrong with Jeremy, so he got him back and she left. Later, Allen finds out that Carl just pulled a random file and that he still does not know who his real mother is.
- Jeff Goldblum as Perry Van Moon, Richard's long-time rival.

== Episodes ==
No.	Title	Directed by	Written by	Original release date	Prod. code	U.S. viewers (millions)
1	"Pilot"	Bernard Derriman	Jonah Hill & Andrew Mogel & Jarrad Paul	October 30, 2011	1ASB01	4.77
Because of the Great Recession, successful seven-year-old Allen Gregory DeLongpre has been forced to attend elementary school. But because of his precociousness, he has difficulty fitting in. He becomes infatuated with school principal Judith Gottlieb.
2	"1 Night in Gottlieb"	Colin Heck	Michael Colton & John Aboud	November 6, 2011	1ASB03	4.31
Allen Gregory attempts to make a sex tape with Principal Gottlieb. Meanwhile, Richard and Jeremy recruit some cool kids to hang out with Julie to make her seem cool.
3	"Gay School Dance"	Tyree Dillihay	Jonah Hill & Andrew Mogel & Jarrad Paul	November 13, 2011	1ASB02	4.24
Tension occurs when Joel Zadak invites Allen Gregory's best friend Patrick and not Allen to the school dance.
4	"Interracial McAdams"	Bernard Derriman	Hayes Davenport	November 20, 2011	1ASB06	3.97
When Joel Zadak stays home from school because he's sick, the always presumptuous Allen Gregory steps in to help his popular "friend" by keeping tabs on the clique. As Allen Gregory gains some ground with the exclusive group, Zadak loses more than his friends. Meanwhile, Richard hits the boardroom at his father's company.
5	"Full Blown Maids"	Wes Archer	Guy Endore Kaiser	November 27, 2011	1ASB04	3.18
Gina decides to teach Allen Gregory a lesson by making him write a paper on racism after he mistakes Guillermo, a fellow Hispanic classmate, for the school janitor. Allen refuses to write the paper and instead produces a school play and presents it to the school, staff and student parents.
6	"Mom Sizemore"	Jennifer Coyle	Sean Clements & Dominic Dierkes	December 4, 2011	1ASB05	5.21
Allen Gregory discovers that it is biologically impossible for a male to bear a child, contrary to the story that he was conceived by his two fathers, a lie his father told him. Allen decides to find his biological mother Sheila and reunite her with his father, while shutting Jeremy out, until he realizes it's a terrible mistake.
7	"Van Moon Rising"	Tyree Dillihay	Gene Hong	December 18, 2011	1ASB07	3.32
Allen Gregory attempts to blackmail Principal Gottlieb to date him. He succeeds at first, but then Judith turns her back on him by reading a love letter from her husband, the school's counselor.

== Production ==
The series was a co-production of 20th Century Fox Television and Chernin Entertainment. Jonah Hill co-created the series with Andrew Mogel and Jarrad Paul. All three, along with Peter Chernin and Katherine Pope, served as executive producers. David A. Goodman, who was with the series Family Guy until its ninth season after its 2005 return to television, was the showrunner and a further executive producer. South Korean studios Yeson Entertainment and Hanho Heung-Up Company handled the series' animation.

Fox placed an order for seven episodes in October 2010. On July 12, 2011, Fox ordered six additional scripts of the series.

== Reception ==
Allen Gregory received mixed-to-negative reviews from critics and was generally panned by audiences. Chris Swanson of WhatCulture gave the pilot episode a rating of 0.5 out of 5, saying "There is nothing charming, witty or interesting about this show. It's just one horribly stupid, cringe-inducing moment after another with characters who are truly loathsome and unpleasant." Robert Bianco of USA Today also gave the show a negative review, saying it was "nasty and brutish", "rarely funny", and made them "hate every character except Julie". Metacritic gave the show a weighted average score of 40 out of 100 based on 21 reviews.

== Broadcast ==
Allen Gregory aired on Global in Canada, simsubbed in most regions. In the UK, it was shown on E4.

== See also ==
- List of television shows notable for negative reception
