= Edward Barbanell =

American actor and comedian

- Born: December 6, 1977 (age 47); Manhattan, New York, U.S.
- Other names: Eddie Barbanell
- Occupations: Actor; comedian
- Years active: 2000–present

Edward "Eddie" Barbanell (born December 6, 1977) is an American actor and comedian with Down syndrome, best known for playing the character of Billy in the 2005 film The Ringer. He attended Coral Springs High School where he graduated in 1996. He has been acting since 2000, mostly in plays, and has studied acting with Jay Lynch of the Opus Theater, Selma Glass at the Coconut Creek Recreation Center, and Allan Press of the Youth Theater in Boca Raton, Florida.

He made his return to film in October 2010, having a minor role in the film Jackass 3D. He starred as himself alongside Johnny Knoxville, whom he met while filming The Ringer.

In 2011, Barbanell had a guest role as Bradley ("B-Rad") in the Comedy Central series Workaholics, reprising it again in the 2013 season 3 episode "Booger Nights." Also in 2011, he played the part of "Testiclees' Cousin" in National Lampoon's 301: The Legend of Awesomest Maximus.

He appeared as a guest in the MTV show Ridiculousness on August 15, 2013. In 2014, Barbanell appeared as a nursing home orderly in Dumb and Dumber To. He appears in the 2015 film Addicted to Fresno. Most recently he appeared as Charlie on the show Loudermilk.
