= Break Point (film) =

- Promotional movie poster
- Directed by: Jay Karas
- Screenplay by: Gene Hong
- Story by: Gene Hong; Jeremy Sisto
- Produced by: Gabriel Hammond; Devin Adair; Jeremy Sisto
- Starring: Jeremy Sisto; David Walton; Amy Smart; Joshua Rush; Vincent Ventresca; Adam DeVine; J. K. Simmons
- Cinematography: Jim Frohna
- Edited by: Brad Wilhite; Seth Clark
- Music by: Tim Anderson
- Distributed by: Broad Green Pictures
- Release dates: March 8, 2014 (SXSW); September 4, 2015 (United States)
- Country: United States
- Language: English

Break Point is a U.S. comedy film directed by Jay Karas. The film stars Jeremy Sisto and David Walton as two estranged brothers (and former tennis partners) who reunite and decide to make a run at a grand slam tournament.

The film first premiered at South by Southwest Film Festival on March 8, 2014. The film was released on July 21, 2015 on video on demand prior to the film being released in a limited release on September 4, 2015.

== Plot ==
Brash man-child Jimmy Price knows his days as a doubles tennis player are nearly finished. Since he's burned practically all of his bridges on the pro circuit, it's a huge blow when his latest partner drops him. With no other option, he tries to revive his career by convincing his estranged brother (and former tennis partner) Darren to join him on the court. With the help of an unusual 11-year-old named Barry, the duo make a go at a grand slam tournament.

== Cast ==
- Jeremy Sisto as Jimmy
- Adam DeVine as Nick
- David Walton as Darren
- Amy Smart as Heather
- J. K. Simmons as Jack
- Joshua Rush as Barry
- Chris Parnell as Jay LaRoche
- Vincent Ventresca as Gary

== Release ==
The film had its world premiere at the South by Southwest Film Festival on March 8, 2014. The film went on to premiere at the Dallas International Film Festival on April 11, 2014. Newport Beach International Film Festival on April 25, 2014. and the Nantucket Film Festival on June 25, 2014. in April 2015, it was announced Broad Green Pictures had acquire distribution rights to the film. The film was released on July 21, 2015 on video on demand prior to the film being released in a limited release on September 4, 2015.

== Reception ==
Break Point received generally positive reviews from critics. On Rotten Tomatoes the film has an approval rating of 71% based on 21 reviews. Christine N. Ziemba wrote in Paste that "It’s passable, light entertainment, but ultimately comes up short when reaching for deeper comedic or dramatic flair."
