= David Walton (actor) =

American actor (born 1978)

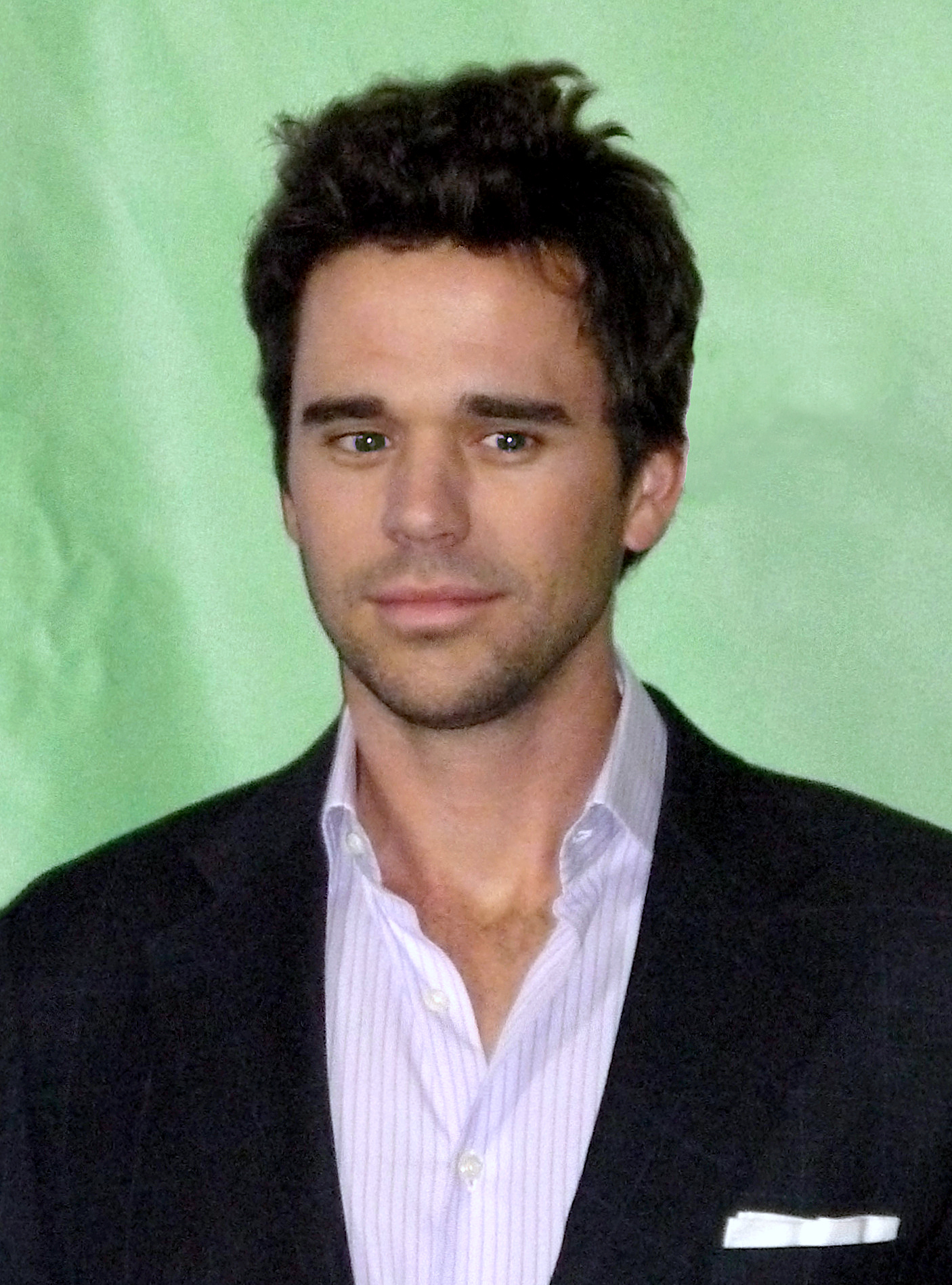
- Walton in 2011
- Born: October 27, 1978 (age 47)
- Education: Brown University
- Occupation: Actor
- Years active: 2002–present
- Spouse: Majandra Delfino (m. 2011)
- Children: 2

David B. Walton (born October 27, 1978) is an American actor. He is known for his role in the television sitcom Cracking Up (2004), as Liam Connor. He has starred in several television programs, including the drama series Heist (2006), comedy series New Girl (2012–2018), and on the NBC comedies Perfect Couples (2010–2011), Bent (2012), and About a Boy (2014–2015). He played Dr. Rick in the comedy film Fired Up! (2009).

== Early life and education ==
Born to John Hunter Walton Jr. and his wife, Carolyn K. Walton, he is one of seven siblings.

Walton graduated from St. Paul's School in Concord, New Hampshire in 1997. He is a 2001 graduate of Brown University in Providence, Rhode Island.

== Personal life ==
On March 18, 2011, Walton married actress Majandra Delfino in Miami, Florida. They have two children, daughter Cecilia Delphine Walton (born June 14, 2012) and son Louis Augustus Walton (born November 10, 2013).

== Filmography ==
=== Film ===
Year	Title	Role	Notes
2002	Fighting Still Life	Eric	Short
2004	Stateside	John Pelusso	
2005	New Car Smell	Dave	TV movie
2007	Earano	-	Short
2009	Fired Up!	Dr. Rick	
2009	Bent	Sam	Short
2010	Burlesque	Mark the DJ	
2013	The Makeover	Elliot Doolittle	TV movie
2014	Break Point	Darren	
2014	Think Like a Man Too	Terrell	
2016	Bad Moms	Mike Mitchell	
2018	Happy Anniversary	Arik	
2019	Maggie	Ben	Short
2019	Awokened	Theo	Short
2020	Eat Wheaties!	Tom Straw	
2020	Reversal of Fortune	Eric	Short
2021	Later Days	Mike	
2022	Susie Searches	Deputy Graham	
2023	Swipe NYC	Josh	Short
2024	The Inheritance	Charles Abernathy Jr.	

=== Television ===
Year	Title	Role	Notes
2004	Cracking Up	Liam Connor	Main Cast
2006	The Loop	Marco	Episode: "Pilot"
2006	Heist	Ricky Watman	Main Cast
2008	Quarterlife	Danny Franklin	Main Cast
2009	In Plain Sight	Willie Ripp/Willie Rabson	Episode: "One Night Stan"
2010	100 Questions	Wayne	Main Cast
2010–11	Perfect Couples	Vance	Main Cast
2011	Happy Endings	Henry	Episode: "Spooky Endings"
2012	Bent	Pete	Main Cast
2012–18	New Girl	Sam Sweeney	Recurring Cast: Season 2 & 5, Guest: Season 7
2014	Parenthood	Will Freeman	Episode: "Jump Ball"; crossover from About a Boy
2014-15	About a Boy	Will Freeman	Main Cast
2016	Angie Tribeca	Brad Wilson	Episode: "Beach Blanket Sting-O"
2016	Gortimer Gibbon’s Life on Normal Street	White Hat	Episode: "Gortimer v. White Hat"
2016	Masters of Sex	Bram Keller	Recurring Cast: Season 4
2017	Brockmire	Gary	Recurring Cast: Season 1
2017	BoJack Horseman	Corbin Creamerman (voice)	Episode: "Time's Arrow"
2017-18	9JKL	Andrew Roberts	Main Cast
2018	Robot Chicken	Jon Snow/Mayor of Santa Fe (voice)	Episode: "Gimme That Chocolate Milk"
2019	Grace and Frankie	Jess	Episode: "The Retreat"
2019	Bajillion Dollar Propertie$	Wilham Murghey	Episode: "Tough Love"
2020	Council of Dads	Sam	Recurring Cast
2023	A Million Little Things	Colton Cutler	Recurring Cast: Season 5
2023	Power Book II: Ghost	Lucas Weston	Main Cast: Season 3

== See also ==
- List of Brown University people
- List of people from Boston
