= Zoe Jarman =

American actress (born 1982)

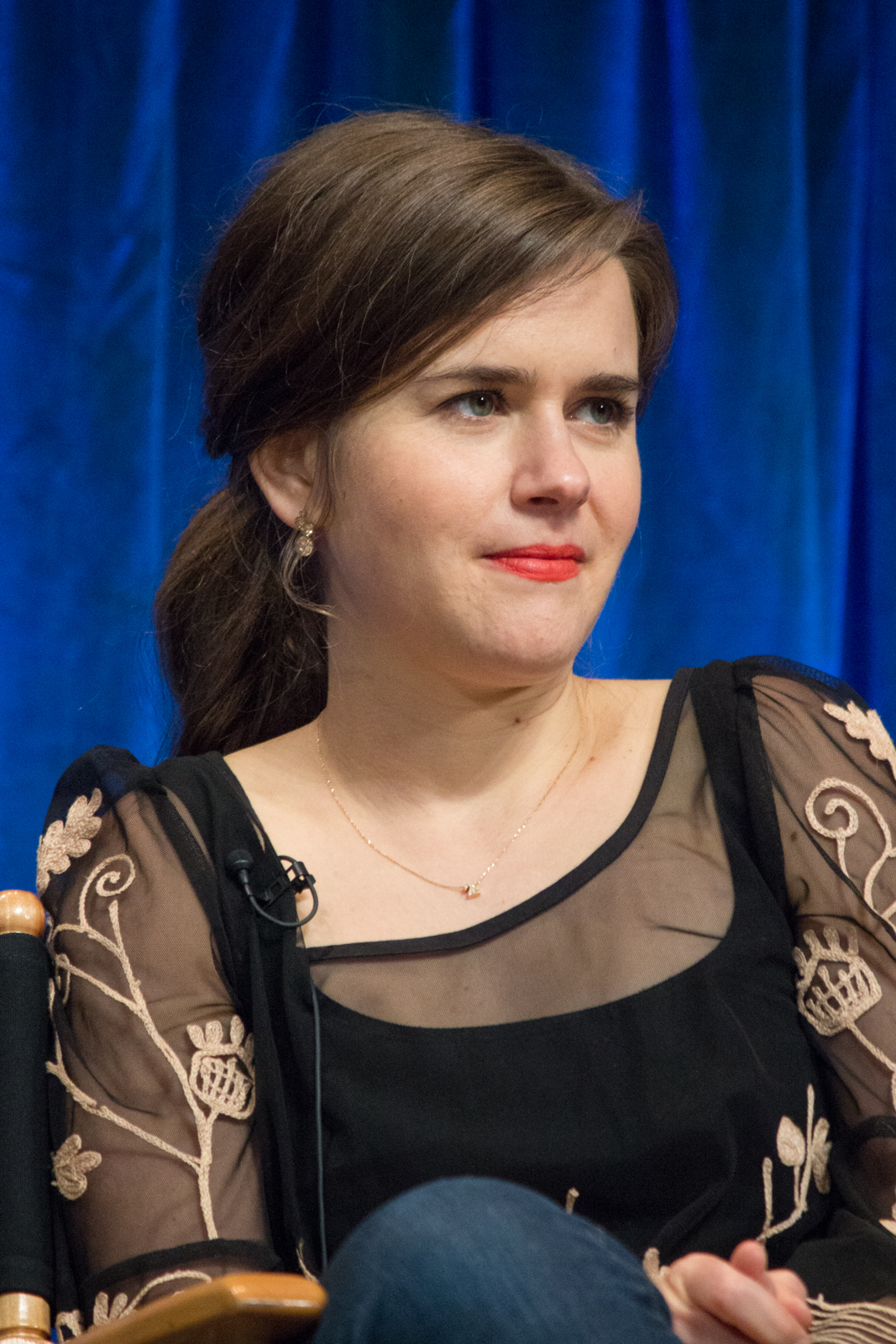
- Jarman at PaleyFest 2013's panel for The Mindy Project
- Born: 1982 or 1983 (age 43–44)
- Occupations: Actress, screenwriter
- Years active: 2005–present

Zoe Jarman (born 1982 or 1983) is an American actress, comedian and writer best known for her roles on Huge and The Mindy Project.

== Biography ==
Jarman's career has mostly concentrated on comedic performances. Her best known roles are Poppy in the 2010 ABC Family series Huge, and Betsy Putch on the first two seasons of the FOX sitcom The Mindy Project. She has also made guest appearances on The Office, The Birthday Boys, and Modern Family.

Jarman is a regular performer at the Upright Citizens Brigade Theatre in Los Angeles, where she has performed her multiple one-woman shows.

Jarman is also a screenwriter, and has written for the Comedy Central series Workaholics and the Netflix series Master of None.

== Filmography ==
Television
Year	Title	Role	Notes
2008	Greek	Tour Guide / The Tour Guide	3 episodes
2010	Huge	Poppy	10 episodes
2010	The Office	Carla	Episode: "Christening"
2012	Modern Family	Lindsay	Episode: "Egg Drop"
2012–2014	The Mindy Project	Betsy Putch	Main role (Seasons 1-2); 40 episodes
2013, 2014	The Birthday Boys	Kate/Julie	2 episodes
2015	Comedy Bang! Bang!	Ophelia Sad	Episode: "Brie Larson Wears a Billowy Long-Sleeve Shirt and White Saddle Shoes"
2016	Workaholics	Zoey	Episode: "Death Of A Salesdude"

Film
Year	Title	Role	Notes
2009	He's Just Not That Into You	Sorority Girl	
2013	The Mindy Project: The Morgan Project	Betsy Putch	Short film
2014	Possibilia	Pollie	Short film
2015	Beta	Dr. Flicker	Short film
2016	The Fun Company	Amanda	Short film
2017	The Sub	Mae Zalinski	Short film
