= Sean Clements =

American writer, podcast host, and television producer

- Born: August 4, 1981 (age 45); Connecticut, U.S.
- Occupations: Writer; actor; producer; comedian; podcast sidekick
- Notable work: Workaholics; The Grinder; Allen Gregory; Parks and Recreation; Hollywood Handbook; Kevin Can F**k Himself
- Children: 2

Sean Clements (born August 4, 1981) is an American writer, comedian, television producer, and podcast host. He grew up in Connecticut and is best known, along with Hayes Davenport, as one half of The Boys, the duo who hosts the podcast Hollywood Handbook.

He has written for Kevin Can F**k Himself, Ash vs Evil Dead, Stone Cold Fox, Workaholics, The Grinder, Allen Gregory, Making History, Murder Police, and United We Fall, and was an executive producer on Ghosted.. In 2025, he joined the writers' room for season 3 of Severance as a co-executive producer.. Clements wrote the 2026 film The Dink starring Jake Johnson and released on Apple TV. He has appeared as an actor in Workaholics, Parks and Recreation, The Colbert Report, Love, Comedy Bang! Bang!, Alone Together, and Curb Your Enthusiasm.

In addition to Hollywood Handbook, Clements is known for the spin-off podcasts Hollywood Masterclass, Hollywood Handbook: Pro Version, and The Flagrant Ones. Clements starred in the limited run podcast An Oral History of the 1993 Tappan Jr. High School Talent Show.

Clements is a frequent performer of improv at UCB, performing weekly with Shitty Jobs at UCB Franklin in Los Angeles since 2009. He previously performed on New York Harold teams from 2006 to 2009: Tantrum, The Fucking Kennedys, Bangs, and Badman.
