= Jay Karas =

American director

- Education: University of Southern California
- Occupations: Film director, television director
- Years active: 1994–present
- Spouse: Monica
- Children: 1
- Website: jaykaras.com

Jaime Eliezer Karas,who is also known as Jay Karas, is an American film and television director.

== Career ==
Karas's resume primarily consists of directing live telecasts and stand-up comedy specials. In recent years he moved on to directing episodic television, directing episodes of Parks and Recreation, Raising Hope, Awkward, The Fosters, Brooklyn Nine-Nine and Workaholics. In 2014, Karas made his feature film directing debut with the film Break Point, starring Jeremy Sisto and David Walton.

Karas's episode of Dice was one of The Hollywood Reporter's "Critics' Picks: The 15 Best TV Episodes of 2016" and Teachers made Vanity Fair's "5 Underrated TV Shows You Should Watch Right Now".

== Personal life ==
Jay grew up in Maryland, Virginia, and Connecticut. He attended Bloomfield High School and graduated from the University of Southern California. He lives in Italy with his wife Monica and their son Leo.

== Filmography ==
=== Television ===
Year	Title	Role	Notes
1997	The Jenny McCarthy Show	Associate director, coordinating producer	22 episodes
2007	The Naked Trucker and T-Bones Show	Director, co-executive producer	8 episodes
2007	MADtv	Director	3 episodes
2007–2008	Frank TV	Director	18 episodes
2009	NESN Comedy All-Stars	Director	8 episodes
2011	Eagleheart	Director	2 episodes
2012–2013	The Burn with Jeff Ross	Director	12 episodes
2011–2013	After Lately	Director, executive producer, co-executive producer	16 episodes
2013	Parks and Recreation	Director	Episode: "Doppelgängers"
2014	Awkward	Director	2 episodes
2014	Unstrung	Director	Television movie, ABC Family
2015	About a Boy	Director	Episode: "About a Manniversary"
2015	The Fosters	Director	Episode: "Justify the Means"
2015	Sirens	Director	2 episodes
2015	Brooklyn Nine-Nine	Director	Episode: "Sabotage"
2015	Finding Carter	Director	Episode: I Knew You Were Trouble
2015	Impastor	Director	2 episodes
2015	Married	Director	2 episodes
2015	Switched at Birth	Director	Episode: "To the Victor Belong the Spoils"
2015	Kevin from Work	Director	Episode: "Escape from Work"
2016	Deadbeat	Director	3 episodes
2016	The Swap	Director	Television movie, Disney Channel
2015–2017	Kirby Buckets	Director	6 episodes
2011–2017	Workaholics	Director	8 episodes
2017	Lopez	Director	2 episodes
2016–2017	Dice	Director	4 episodes
2018	Alone Together	Director	2 episodes
2018	Great News	Director	Episode: "The Fast Track"
2018	Ghosted	Director	Episode: "The Premonition"
2018	Siren	Director	Episode: "Interview With a Mermaid"
2018–2020	Superstore	Director	3 episodes
2018–2019	Splitting Up Together	Director	4 episodes
2016–2018	Those Who Can't	Director	4 episodes
2017–2018	Teachers	Director, producer	16 episodes
2019	The Kids Are Alright	Director	3 episodes
2019	Sunnyside	Director	Episode: "Skirt Skirt"
2020	The Baker and The Beauty	Director	Episode: "Honeymoon's Over"
2020	The Main Event (2020 film)	Director	
2020	Love, Victor	Director	Episode: "What Happens in Willacoochee"
2021	The Moodys	Director	Season two
2021	The Mighty Ducks: Game Changers	Director	Episode: "Breakaway"
2021	Dynasty	Director	Episode: "A Public Forum for Her Lies"
2021	Turner & Hooch	Director	Episode: "Diamonds Are Furever"
2021-2025	Acapulco	Director	5 episodes
2022-2025	Abbott Elementary	Director	5 episodes
2022-2024	Ghosts	Director	3 episodes
2023-2024	So Help Me Todd	Director	Episode: "Ivan the Terrible"
2023	True Lies	Director	Episode: "Independent Dependents"
2026	Best Medicine	Director	3 episodes
Forthcoming	The Extraditers	Co-writer	In partnership with Dean Ward
Forthcoming	Rewrite of Man Up	Co-writer	In partnership with Dean Ward for CBS Films

=== Comedy ===
Year	Title	Role	Notes
2012	D.L. Hughley: Reset	Director, executive producer	D.L. Hughley special
2013	Doug Stanhope: Beer Hall Putsch	Director, executive producer	Doug Stanhope special
2014	Bill Burr: I'm Sorry You Feel That Way	Director	Bill Burr special
2014	Chelsea Peretti: One of the Greats	Executive producer	Chelsea Peretti special
2015	Demetri Martin: Live (At the Time)	Director	Demetri Martin special
2015	Tig Notaro: Boyish Girl Interrupted	Director	Tig Notaro special
2016	Tom Segura: Mostly Stories	Director	Tom Segura specially
2016	Not Safe with Nikki Glaser	Director	Nikki Glaser special
2016	Ali Wong: Baby Cobra	Director	Ali Wong special
2017	Jeff Foxworthy & Larry the Cable Guy: We've Been Thinking	Director	Jeff Foxworthy & Larry the Cable Guy special
2017	Bill Burr: Walk Your Way Out	Director, executive producer	Bill Burr special
2017	Christina P: Mother Inferior	Director	Christina Pazsitzk special
2018	Tom Segura: Disgraceful	Director	Tom Segura special
2018	Ali Wong: Hard Knock Wife	Director	Ali Wong special
2018	Demetri Martin: The Overthinker	Director	Demetri Martin special

=== Advertising ===
Karas has directed spots for brands including Ford, Target, Coke Zero, and Fandango, as well campaigns for ABC, Disney, E!, A&E, and TBS, including Conan's launch campaigns and the viral "Desk Wash" spot.

=== Music video ===
Year	Title	Artist	Role
2004	"Keeping Last"	The Forgiven Fridays	Producer

== Awards ==
Year	Nominee / work	Award	Result
2013	Parks and Recreation	Online Film & Television Association, OFTA Television Award, Best Direction in a Comedy Series	Nominated
2014	Break Point	Newport Beach Film Festival, Outstanding Achievement in Filmmaking	Won
2014	Break Point	SXSW Film Festival, Narrative Spotlight	Nominated
