= Kevin Etten =

American screenwriter and television producer

- Occupations: screenwriter and television producer
- Notable work: The Late Show with David Letterman, Scrubs, Desperate Housewives

Kevin Etten is an American screenwriter and television producer. He began his career as a writer for The Late Show with David Letterman, and then moved on to be the screenwriter and producer for notable television series including Reaper, Workaholics, Scrubs, and Desperate Housewives. He has been nominated twice for Golden Globe awards and has won once.

== Biography ==
Etten was born in a neighborhood on the north side of Chicago. While at Harvard University, he played for the Crimson Hockey team and was editor of The Harvard Lampoon. Beginning as a writer for the Late Show with David Letterman, Etten has since been a part of the crews of the dramedies Ed and Desperate Housewives, the latter for which he also served as a producer. In 2011, Etten began as executive producer of Comedy Central's new show, Workaholics. In 2022, Etten co-wrote and produced the Tom Gormican film The Unbearable Weight of Massive Talent.

== Awards ==
He was nominated for two Golden Globes awards and won the Best Television Series-Musical or Comedy award in 2006 for Desperate Housewives.
