= Workaholics =

American television sitcom (2011–2017)

- Genre: Sitcom
- Created by: Blake Anderson; Adam DeVine; Anders Holm; Kyle Newacheck; Connor Pritchard; Dominic Russo
- Starring: Blake Anderson; Adam DeVine; Anders Holm; Jillian Bell; Maribeth Monroe; Erik Griffin
- Opening theme: "Jockbox" by The Skinny Boys
- Country of origin: United States
- Original language: English
- No. of seasons: 7
- No. of episodes: 86 (list of episodes)

Production
- Executive producers: Kevin Etten; Blake Anderson; Adam DeVine; Anders Holm; Kyle Newacheck; Connor Pritchard; Dominic Russo; David Martin; David Pritchard; Isaac Horne; Jon Thoday; Richard Allen-Turner
- Production location: California
- Editor: David L. Bertman
- Running time: 21 min.; 25 min. (series finale)
- Production companies: Mail Order Comedy; 5th Year Productions (2011–14); Avalon Television; Gigapix Studios (2011–13); Comedy Partners

Original release
- Network: Comedy Central
- Release: April 6, 2011 – March 15, 2017

Workaholics is an American television sitcom created and predominantly written by Blake Anderson, Adam DeVine, Anders Holm, and Kyle Newacheck, all of whom star in the series. Workaholics initially aired on Comedy Central from April 6, 2011, to March 15, 2017, with a total of 86 episodes spanning seven seasons. The series also stars Jillian Bell, Maribeth Monroe, and Erik Griffin. Anderson, DeVine, and Holm play three college dropouts who are housemates, friends, and co-workers at a telemarketing company in Rancho Cucamonga, California.

== Synopsis ==
The main characters met at college, where Blake and Adam were roommates and Anders was their RA. They continued their college behavior as they settled into adulthood, such as drinking, partying, and pulling pranks. A self-proclaimed "friendship family", the trio's schemes are generally confined to their house in Rancho Cucamonga, California, where they often interact with their drug dealer, and a cubicle they share in the office of the telemarketing company TelAmeriCorp, where they clash with their boss and coworkers.

== Cast ==
- Blake Anderson as Blake Henderson
- Adam DeVine as Adam DeMamp
- Anders Holm as Anders "Ders" Holmvik
- Jillian Bell as Jillian Belk (season 1; also starring seasons 2–7)
- Maribeth Monroe as Alice Murphy (season 1; also starring seasons 2–7)
- Erik Griffin as Montez Walker (also starring seasons 2–7; recurring season 1)
- Kyle Newacheck as Karl Hevacheck

== Episodes ==
Season	Episodes	Originally released	
Season	Episodes	First released	Last released
1	10	April 6, 2011	June 8, 2011
2	10	September 20, 2011	November 22, 2011
3	20	May 29, 2012	March 20, 2013
4	13	January 22, 2014	April 16, 2014
5	13	January 14, 2015	April 8, 2015
6	10	January 14, 2016	March 17, 2016
7	10	January 11, 2017	March 15, 2017

== Production ==
The show was co-created and largely written by its three stars, Blake Anderson, Adam DeVine, and Anders Holm. Frequent recurring star Kyle Newacheck also directed most episodes, as well as being a fourth co-creator and serving as executive producer. Kevin Etten was the series' showrunner. Prior to Workaholics, the group was part of the sketch comedy group Mail Order Comedy, which began in 2006 in Los Angeles. They have since created a production company under the same name.

Workaholics was ordered by Comedy Central in March 2010 after Comedy Central executive Walter Newman saw a series of videos that the group had posted on YouTube. The pilot aired as a "TV Sneak Peek" on March 15, 2011, after the Comedy Central Roast of Donald Trump. The program ran its 10-episode first season from April 6 to June 8, 2011, and aired at 10:30 p.m. EDT on Comedy Central. On May 4, 2011, the show was renewed for a second season of 10 episodes, which ran from September 20 to November 22, 2011. On October 25, 2011, the series was renewed for a third season, to contain 20 episodes. The first 10 episodes of Season 3 ran from May 29 to July 31, 2012, and the remaining 10 episodes aired from January 16 to March 20, 2013. Because of the popularity of the series, on January 6, 2013, Comedy Central ordered 13-episode fourth and fifth seasons. The fourth season aired from January 22 to April 16, 2014. The fifth season aired from January 14 to April 8, 2015. On July 9, 2015, Comedy Central renewed the series for a sixth and seventh season, each containing 10 episodes and set to air in 2016 and 2017. It was announced that Season 7 would be the final season; it premiered on January 11, 2017, and concluded on March 15, 2017.

== Canceled film ==
On February 24, 2021, it was announced that the series would be returning as a film, intended for release on Paramount+. However, on January 9, 2023, it was announced that the film had been canceled, just five weeks before filming was set to begin.

== Home media ==
DVD name	Ep #	Release date	Special features	Notes	Format
Season 1	10	October 11, 2011	Cast interviews, deleted scenes, Digital Originals, alternate takes, "Live at Bonnaroo"; audio commentary; and more!	Includes all season 1 episodes on 2 discs.	DVD and Blu-ray
Season 2	10	June 5, 2012	Drunkumentary, bloopers, deleted scenes, alt/extended takes, Inside the Writers Room	Includes all season 2 episodes on 2 discs.	DVD and Blu-ray
Season 3	20	June 18, 2013	Drunkumentary, bloopers, alternate takes, The Other Cubicle Episodes	Includes all season 3 episodes on 3 discs.	DVD and Blu-ray
Season 4	13	June 4, 2014	Bloopers, alternate takes	Includes all season 4 episodes on 2 discs.	DVD and Blu-ray
Season 5	13	June 23, 2015	Deleted scenes, bloopers, alternate takes	Includes all season 5 episodes on 2 discs.	DVD and Blu-ray
Season 6	10	June 21, 2016	Deleted scenes, bloopers, alternate takes	Includes all season 6 episodes on 2 discs.	DVD
Season 7	10	June 20, 2017	Deleted scenes, bloopers, "The Last Shot", "Wrap Reel"	Includes all season 7 episodes on 2 discs.	DVD
The Complete Series	86	June 20, 2017	All special features from seasons 1-7	Includes all 86 episodes from Seasons 1–7 on 15 discs.	DVD
Season 1 & 2 Combo Doggy	20	June 5, 2012	"Live at Bonnaroo", extended "Catherine Zeta-Jones Song", extended "Ders" Rap, Digital Originals, "Shart Stories"	Includes all season 1 and 2 episodes on 2 discs.	Blu-ray

== Reception ==
The A.V. Club's Kevin McFarland has praised the show, calling it "a more adult version of Ed, Edd n Eddy".

Season 1 of Workaholics was met with "mixed or average reviews" in the words of review-tallying website Metacritic, where Matthew Gilbert of The Boston Globe gave the first season an 80 overall, saying it was "witty, irreverent, and joyously juvenile." Dave Wiegand gave the show a 75 overall and added, "The material works more often than not because the guys are completely shameless, which makes them difficult to dislike."

The Season 2 premiere episode was the first to attain an audience of over two million. The highest rating, a 2.16, was achieved in the seventh episode of Season 2 titled "Teenage Mutant Ninja Roommates". The show received its highest number of viewers during the second season and averaged about 1.64 million viewers per episode.

The third-season premiere achieved a 2.11 in the Nielsen ratings, the third highest in the show's history. The number of viewers began to drop off afterward. The final three episodes achieved 1.23, 1.21, and 1.24 respectively. Season 3 wrapped up on March 20, 2013, after 20 episodes split over two broadcast seasons.
