= List of American films of 2014 =

This is a list of American films released in 2014.

== Box office ==
The highest-grossing American films released in 2014, by domestic box office gross revenue, are as follows:

Highest-grossing films of 2014
Rank	Title	Distributor	Domestic Gross
1	American Sniper	Warner Bros.	$350,126,372
2	The Hunger Games: Mockingjay – Part 1	Lionsgate	$337,135,885
3	Guardians of the Galaxy	Disney	$333,176,600
4	Captain America: The Winter Soldier	Disney	$259,766,572
5	The Lego Movie	Warner Bros.	$257,760,692
6	The Hobbit: The Battle of the Five Armies	Warner Bros.	$255,119,788
7	Transformers: Age of Extinction	Paramount	$245,439,076
8	Maleficent	Disney	$241,410,378
9	X-Men: Days of Future Past	20th Century Fox	$233,921,534
10	Big Hero 6	Disney	$222,527,828

== January–March ==
Opening		Title	Production company	Cast and crew	Ref.
J A N U A R Y	3	Paranormal Activity: The Marked Ones	Paramount Pictures	Christopher Landon (director/screenplay); Andrew Jacobs, Jorge Diaz, Gabrielle Walsh, Renée Victor, Noemi Gonzalez, David Saucedo, Gloria Sandoval, Richard Cabral, Carlos Pratts, Juan Vasquez, Dale Heidenreich, Molly Ephraim, Katie Featherston, Micah Sloat, Chloe Csengery, Jessica Tyler Brown, Hallie Foote	
J A N U A R Y	3	Open Grave	Tribeca Films / 852 Films	Gonzálo López-Gallego (director); Chris Borey, Eddie Borey (screenplay); Sharlto Copley, Thomas Kretschmann, Joseph Morgan, Erin Richards, Josie Ho, Max Wrottesley	
J A N U A R Y	10	Cold Comes the Night	Sony Pictures Worldwide Acquisitions	Tze Chun (director/screenplay); Oz Perkins, Nick Simon (screenplay); Alice Eve, Logan Marshall-Green, Bryan Cranston, Ursula Parker, Leo Fitzpatrick	
J A N U A R Y	10	Dumbbells	GoDigital	Christopher Livingston (director); Brian Drolet, Hoyt Richards (screenplay); Brian Drolet, Hoyt Richards, Taylor Cole, Mircea Monroe	
J A N U A R Y	10	The Legend of Hercules	Summit Entertainment / Millennium Films	Renny Harlin (director); Sean Hood, Daniel Giat (screenplay); Kellan Lutz, Gaia Weiss, Scott Adkins, Roxanne McKee, Liam Garrigan, Liam McIntyre, Johnathon Schaech, Rade Šerbedžija, Luke Newberry, Kenneth Cranham, Mariah Gale, Sarai Givaty, Spencer Wilding, Bashar Rahal, Renny Harlin, Richard Alan Reid	
J A N U A R Y	10	Raze	IFC Midnight	Josh C. Waller (director); Robert Beaucage (screenplay); Zoë Bell, Rachel Nichols, Tracie Thoms, Sherilyn Fenn, Doug Jones, Bruce Thomas, Rebecca Marshall, Adrienne Wilkinson, Allene Quincy, Bailey Borders, Jordan James Smith	
J A N U A R Y	17	Back in the Day	Screen Media Films	Michael Rosenbaum (director/screenplay); Morena Baccarin, Danielle Bisutti, Liz Carey, Emma Caulfield, Sarah Colonna, Jay R. Ferguson, Mike Hagerty, Isaiah Mustafa, Kristoffer Polaha, Michael Rosenbaum, Nick Swardson, Harland Williams, Louie Lawless, Theresa Tilly, Richard Marx, Mikaela Hoover	
J A N U A R Y	17	Devil's Due	20th Century Fox / Davis Entertainment	Matt Bettinelli-Olpin, Tyler Gillett (directors); Lindsay Devlin (screenplay); Allison Miller, Zach Gilford, Sam Anderson, Vanessa Ray, Madison Wolfe, Aimee Carrero, Robert Belushi, Kurt Krause, Michael Papajohn, Griff Furst, Bill Martin Williams, Geraldine Singer, Julia Denton, Colin Walker	
J A N U A R Y	17	Jack Ryan: Shadow Recruit	Paramount Pictures / Skydance Productions	Kenneth Branagh (director); Adam Cozad, David Koepp (screenplay); Chris Pine, Kevin Costner, Kenneth Branagh, Keira Knightley, Lenn Kudrjawizki, Alec Utgoff, Peter Andersson, Elena Velikanova, Nonso Anozie, Seth Ayott, Colm Feore, Gemma Chan, Parker Sawyers, Georg Nikoloff, Angus Wright, Alexander Mercury, Montego Glover, Mike Houston, Akie Kotabe, Santino Fontana, Sam Rosen, Karen David, Matt Rippy, Bogdan Kominowski, Erich Redman, Pat Kiernan, Isobel Pravda, David Paymer, David Hayman, Hannah Taylor-Gordon, John Schwab, Frank Harts, Cotter Smith, Mikhail Baryshnikov	
J A N U A R Y	17	Jamesy Boy	Phase 4 Films	Trevor White (director/screenplay); Lane Shadgett (screenplay); Spencer Lofranco, Mary-Louise Parker, Ving Rhames, Taissa Farmiga, Michael Trotter, Rosa Salazar, Ben Rosenfield, Jimmy "Taboo" Gomez, James Woods	
J A N U A R Y	17	The Nut Job	Open Road Films	Peter Lepeniotis (director/screenplay); Lorne Cameron (screenplay); Will Arnett, Brendan Fraser, Liam Neeson, Katherine Heigl, Stephen Lang, Jeff Dunham, Gabriel Iglesias, Sarah Gadon, Maya Rudolph, James Rankin, Scott Yaphe, Joe Pingue, Annick Obonsawin, Julie Lemieux, Rob Tinkler, James Kee, Scott McCord, Katie Griffin, Psy, Rene Bitorajac	
J A N U A R Y	17	Ride Along	Universal Pictures	Tim Story (director); Greg Coolidge, Jason Mantzoukas, Phil Hay, Matt Manfredi (screenplay); Ice Cube, Kevin Hart, John Leguizamo, Bryan Callen, Tika Sumpter, Laurence Fishburne, Bruce McGill, Dragoș Bucur, Gary Owen, Jacob Latimore, Jay Pharoah, Benjamin "Lil P-Nut" Flores, Jasmine Burke, David Banner, Angie Stone, Eric Goins, Lucius Baston, Mickey Cassidy	
J A N U A R Y	21	Black Water Vampire	Image Entertainment	Evan Tramel (director/screenplay); Bill Oberst Jr., Danielle Lozeau, Andrea Monier, Anthony Fanelli	
J A N U A R Y	24	I, Frankenstein	Lionsgate / Lakeshore Entertainment / SKE Films	Stuart Beattie (director/screenplay); Aaron Eckhart, Bill Nighy, Yvonne Strahovski, Miranda Otto, Socratis Otto, Jai Courtney, Aden Young, Caitlin Stasey, Mahesh Jadu, Steve Mouzakis, Nicholas Bell, Deniz Akdeniz, Christopher Pang, Kevin Grevioux, Bruce Spence, Virginie Le Brun, John Reynolds, Penny Higgs, Goran Kleut, Yasca Sinigaglia, Nicole Downs	
J A N U A R Y	24	Mega Shark Versus Mecha Shark	The Asylum	Emile Edwin Smith (director); Jose Prendes, H. Perry Horton (screenplay); Christopher Judge, Elisabeth Röhm, Debbie Gibson	
J A N U A R Y	31	That Awkward Moment	Focus Features	Tom Gormican (director/screenplay); Zac Efron, Miles Teller, Michael B. Jordan, Imogen Poots, Mackenzie Davis, Jessica Lucas, Addison Timlin, Josh Pais, Evelina Turen, Karen Ludwig, Tina Benko, Joseph Adams, Lola Glaudini, John Rothman, Barbara Garrick, Emily Meade, Alysia Reiner, Reif Larsen, Chris Grace, Victor Slezak, Eugenia Kuzmina, D.B. Woodside	
J A N U A R Y	31	Somewhere Slow	Screen Media Films	Jeremy O'Keefe (director/screenplay); Jessalyn Gilsig, Graham Patrick Martin, David Costabile, Wallace Langham, Lindsay Crouse, Robert Forster	
F E B R U A R Y	4	Android Cop	The Asylum	Mark Atkins (director/screenplay); Michael Jai White, Charles S. Dutton, Randy Wayne, Kadeem Hardison	
F E B R U A R Y	4	The Outsider	Oak Street Films	Brian A. Miller (director/screenplay); Craig Fairbrass, James Caan, Shannon Elizabeth, Jason Patric, Melissa Ordway, Johnny Messner	
F E B R U A R Y	4	Scorned	Anchor Bay Films	Mark Jones (director/screenplay); Sadie Katz (screenplay); AnnaLynne McCord, Billy Zane, Viva Bianca	
F E B R U A R Y	7	After the Dark	Phase 4 Films	John Huddles (director/screenplay); James D'Arcy, Sophie Lowe, Daryl Sabara, Freddie Stroma, Rhys Wakefield, Bonnie Wright	
F E B R U A R Y	7	Nurse 3D	Lionsgate	Doug Aarniokoski (director/screenplay); David Loughery (screenplay); Paz de la Huerta, Katrina Bowden, Corbin Bleu, Judd Nelson, Boris Kodjoe, Melanie Scrofano, Niecy Nash, Martin Donovan, Chris Hoffman, Brittany Adams, Kathleen Turner, Patrick Kwok-Choon, Linda Papadopoulos, Kjartan Hewitt, Michael Eklund, Michael Therriault, Blake Mawson, Adam Herschman, Tracy Michailidis, Jeff Pangman, David Huband	
F E B R U A R Y	7	The Lego Movie	Warner Bros. Pictures / Warner Animation Group / Village Roadshow Pictures	Phil Lord and Christopher Miller (directors/screenplay); Chris Pratt, Will Ferrell, Elizabeth Banks, Will Arnett, Nick Offerman, Alison Brie, Charlie Day, Liam Neeson, Morgan Freeman, Channing Tatum, Jonah Hill, Cobie Smulders, Anthony Daniels, Keith Ferguson, Billy Dee Williams, Shaquille O'Neal, Will Forte, Dave Franco, Jake Johnson, Keegan-Michael Key, Christopher Miller, Chris McKay, Chris Romano, Jorma Taccone, Melissa Sturm, Jadon Sand	
F E B R U A R Y	7	The Monuments Men	Columbia Pictures / 20th Century Fox	George Clooney (director/screenplay); Grant Heslov (screenplay); George Clooney, Matt Damon, Bill Murray, John Goodman, Jean Dujardin, Bob Balaban, Hugh Bonneville, Cate Blanchett, Dimitri Leonidas, Justus von Dohnányi, Holger Handtke, Zachary Baharov, Michael Brandner, Sam Hazeldine, Miles Jupp, Alexandre Desplat, Diarmaid Murtagh, Serge Hazanavicius, Grant Heslov, Christian Rodska, Matt Rippy, John Dagleish, Nick Clooney, Joel Basman, Andrew Alexander, Adrian Bouchet, Audrey Marnay, Michael Hofland, Luc Feit, Udo Kroschwald, Michael Dalton, James Payton	
F E B R U A R Y	7	The Pretty One	Dada Films	Jenée LaMarque (director/screenplay); Zoe Kazan, Jake Johnson, John Carroll Lynch, Shae D'lyn, Frankie Shaw, Sterling Beaumon, Ron Livingston	
F E B R U A R Y	7	Vampire Academy	The Weinstein Company	Mark Waters (director); Daniel Waters (screenplay); Zoey Deutch, Lucy Fry, Danila Kozlovsky, Dominic Sherwood, Cameron Monaghan, Sami Gayle, Sarah Hyland, Joely Richardson, Olga Kurylenko, Gabriel Byrne, Ashley Charles, Claire Foy, Dominique Tipper, Edward Holcroft, Chris Mason, Ben Peel, Ramon Tikaram, Shelley Longworth, Rory Fleck-Byrne, Laurie Davidson, Nick Gillard, Anya Taylor-Joy, Will Tudor	
F E B R U A R Y	12	RoboCop	Metro-Goldwyn-Mayer / Columbia Pictures	José Padilha (director); Joshua Zetumer, Edward Neumeier, Michael Miner (screenplay); Joel Kinnaman, Gary Oldman, Michael Keaton, Samuel L. Jackson, Abbie Cornish, Jackie Earle Haley, Michael K. Williams, Jennifer Ehle, Jay Baruchel, Marianne Jean-Baptiste, Aimee Garcia, Douglas Urbanski, John Paul Ruttan, K.C. Collins, Daniel Kash, Zach Grenier, Matt Cook, Marjan Neshat, Philip Akin, Melanie Scrofano, Alex Mallari Jr., Tattiawna Jones, Jordan Johnson-Hinds, Aurora Browne, Paul Sun-Hyung Lee, Dean Redman, Kirby Morrow, Patrick Garrow, Maura Grierson, Noorin Gulamgaus	
F E B R U A R Y	14	About Last Night	Screen Gems / Rainforest Films	Steve Pink (director); Leslye Headland (screenplay); Kevin Hart, Michael Ealy, Regina Hall, Joy Bryant, Christopher McDonald, Paula Patton, Adam Rodriguez, Joe Lo Truglio, Terrell Owens, David Greenman, Bryan Callen, Selita Ebanks, Jessica Lu, Michael Voltaggio, Jack Betts, Mehcad Brooks, Steve Terada	
F E B R U A R Y	14	Adult World	IFC Films	Scott Coffey (director); Andy Cochran (screenplay); Emma Roberts, Evan Peters, John Cusack, Armando Riesco, Shannon Woodward, Reed Birney, Catherine Lloyd Burns, Chris Riggi, Cloris Leachman, John Cullum, Scott Coffey, Jo Mei, Leah Lauren	
F E B R U A R Y	14	Camp Takota	VHX	Chris Riedell, Nick Riedell (director); Mamrie Hart, Lydia Genner (screenplay); Grace Helbig, Hannah Hart, Mamrie Hart	
F E B R U A R Y	14	Date and Switch	Lionsgate	Chris Nelson (director); Alan Yang (screenplay); Nicholas Braun, Hunter Cope, Dakota Johnson, Zach Cregger, Nick Offerman, Gary Cole, Megan Mullally, Sarah Hyland, Brian Geraghty, Quinn Lord, Adam DiMarco, Aziz Ansari, Larry Wilmore, Dustin Ybarra, Cainan Wiebe, Ray Santiago, Samuel Patrick Chu, William Vaughan, Harris Allan, Rob Huebel, Bryce Hodgson, Wendi McLendon-Covey, Andrew Jenkins, Laci J. Mailey, Darcy Michael, MacKenzie Porter, Dreama Walker	
F E B R U A R Y	14	Endless Love	Universal Pictures	Shana Feste (director/screenplay); Joshua Safran (screenplay); Alex Pettyfer, Gabriella Wilde, Bruce Greenwood, Joely Richardson, Robert Patrick, Rhys Wakefield, Dayo Okeniyi, Emma Rigby, Anna Enger, Fabianne Therese, Jeff Pope, Patrick Johnson	
F E B R U A R Y	14	Someone Marry Barry	FilmBuff	Rob Pearlstein (director/screenplay); Tyler Labine, Lucy Punch, Damon Wayans, Jr., Hayes MacArthur, Thomas Middleditch, Rachel Frances Shaw, Wyatt Oleff, Brian Huskey, Greg Germann, Lauren Miller Rogen, Brett Gelman, Ginger Gonzaga, Vivian Bang, Jerry Minor, Rob Pearlstein, Scott Whyte, Liza Lapira, Joe Lo Truglio, Ed Helms, Amanda Lund, Kathy Bell Denton, J. Robin Miller	
F E B R U A R Y	14	Winter's Tale	Warner Bros. Pictures / Village Roadshow Pictures / Weed Road Pictures	Akiva Goldsman (director/screenplay); Colin Farrell, Russell Crowe, Jessica Brown Findlay, Jennifer Connelly, Will Smith, William Hurt, Eva Marie Saint, Finn Wittrock, Matt Bomer, Kevin Durand, Kevin Corrigan, Graham Greene, Brian Hutchison, Alan Doyle, Scott Grimes, Joshua Henry, Maggie Geha, Caitlin Dulany, Norm Lewis, Rob Campbell, Maurice Jones, Ripley Sobo, April Grace	
F E B R U A R Y	18	Apocalypse Pompeii	The Asylum	Ben Demaree (director); Jacob Cooney, Bill Hanstock (screenplay); Adrian Paul, Jhey Castles, John Rhys-Davies, Dylan Vox, Dan Cade	
F E B R U A R Y	21	3 Days to Kill	Relativity Media	McG (director); Adi Hasak, Luc Besson (screenplay); Kevin Costner, Amber Heard, Hailee Steinfeld, Connie Nielsen, Tómas Lemarquis, Richard Sammel, Jonas Bloquet, Eriq Ebouaney, Marie Guillard, Maï Anh Le, David Coburn, Raymond J. Barry, Marc Andréoni, Bruno Ricci, Joakhim Sigue, Alison Valence, Big John, Michaël Vander-Meiren, Rupert Wynne-James, Shane Woodward, Omid Zader	
F E B R U A R Y	21	Angels in Stardust	High-Motor Productions	William Robert Carey (director/screenplay); Alicia Silverstone, AJ Michalka, Billy Burke	
F E B R U A R Y	21	Barefoot	Roadside Attractions	Andrew Fleming (director); Stephen Zotnowski (screenplay); Evan Rachel Wood, Scott Speedman, Treat Williams, Kate Burton, J. K. Simmons	
F E B R U A R Y	21	Holy Ghost People	XLrator Media	Mitchell Altieri (director/screenplay); Kevin Artigue, Joe Egender, Phil Flores (screenplay); Emma Greenwell, Brendan McCarthy, Cameron Richardson, Roger Aaron Brown, Donald Patrick Harvey, Joe Egender	
F E B R U A R Y	21	Pompeii	TriStar Pictures	Paul W. S. Anderson (director); Janet Scott Batchler, Lee Batchler, Michael Robert Johnson (Screenplay); Kit Harington, Emily Browning, Carrie-Anne Moss, Adewale Akinnuoye-Agbaje, Jessica Lucas, Jared Harris, Kiefer Sutherland, Joe Pingue, Currie Graham, Sasha Roiz, Dalmar Abuzeid, Emmanuel Kabongo, Janine Theriault, Ben Lewis, Alain Moussi, Jean-Francois Lachapelle, Rebecca Eady, Ron Kennell, Tom Bishop Sr.	
F E B R U A R Y	28	The Bag Man	Cinedigm	David Grovic (director/screenplay); Paul Conway (screenplay); John Cusack, Rebecca Da Costa, Robert De Niro, Crispin Glover, Dominic Purcell, Sticky Fingaz	
F E B R U A R Y	28	Non-Stop	Universal Pictures / StudioCanal / Silver Pictures	Jaume Collet-Serra (director); John W. Richardson, Chris Roach, Ryan Engle (screenplay); Liam Neeson, Julianne Moore, Scoot McNairy, Michelle Dockery, Nate Parker, Jason Butler Harner, Anson Mount, Corey Stoll, Lupita Nyong'o, Omar Metwally, Linus Roache, Shea Whigham, Quinn McColgan, Corey Hawkins, Frank Deal, Bar Paly, Edoardo Costa, Jon Abrahams, Pat Kiernan, O-T Fagbenle, Charlotte Kirk, Rakesh Shah	
F E B R U A R Y	28	Repentance	Lionsgate	Philippe Caland (director); Shintaro Shimosawa (screenplay); Forest Whitaker, Anthony Mackie, Mike Epps, Nicole Ari Parker, Sanaa Lathan	
F E B R U A R Y	28	Son of God	20th Century Fox	Christopher Spencer (director/screenplay); Richard Bedser, Colin Swash, Nic Young (screenplay); Diogo Morgado, Greg Hicks, Adrian Schiller, Darwin Shaw, Sebastian Knapp, Joe Wredden, Simon Kunz, Paul Marc Davis, Matthew Gravelle, Amber Rose Revah, Roma Downey	
M A R C H	7	300: Rise of an Empire	Warner Bros. Pictures / Legendary Pictures / Atmosphere Entertainment / Cruel and Unusual Films	Noam Murro (director); Zack Snyder, Kurt Johnstad (screenplay); Sullivan Stapleton, Eva Green, Lena Headey, Hans Matheson, Rodrigo Santoro, Callan Mulvey, David Wenham, Jack O'Connell, Andrew Tiernan, Igal Naor, Andrew Pleavin, Peter Mensah, Ben Turner, Ashraf Barhom, Christopher Sciueref, Steven Cree, Caitlin Carmichael, Jade Chynoweth, David Sterne, David Pevsner, Peter Ferdinando, Mark Killeen, Luke Roberts, Christopher Maleki, Julian Stone, Gerard Butler, Michael Fassbender	
M A R C H	7	Mr. Peabody & Sherman	20th Century Fox / DreamWorks Animation / Bullwinkle Studios / PDI/DreamWorks	Rob Minkoff (director); Craig Wright (screenplay); Ty Burrell, Max Charles, Ariel Winter, Stephen Colbert, Leslie Mann, Allison Janney, Stephen Tobolowsky, Stanley Tucci, Adam Alexi-Malle, Patrick Warburton, Zach Callison, Steve Valentine, Dennis Haysbert, Leila Birch, Karan Brar, Joshua Rush, Thomas Lennon, Mel Brooks, Lake Bell, Jess Harnell, Tom McGrath, Al Rodrigo, Walt Dohrn, Nicholas Guest, Robert Ben Garant, Rob Minkoff, Pat Musick, Ava Acres, Eva Bella, Jeff Fischer, Don Fullilove, Rif Hutton, Luisa Leschin, Scott Menville, Edie Mirman, Raymond Ochoa, Michelle Ruff, Alan Shearman, Claudette Wells, Lauri Fraser, Guillaume Aretos	
M A R C H	7	The Grand Budapest Hotel	Fox Searchlight Pictures	Wes Anderson (director/screenplay); Ralph Fiennes, F. Murray Abraham, Mathieu Amalric, Adrien Brody, Willem Dafoe, Jeff Goldblum, Harvey Keitel, Jude Law, Bill Murray, Edward Norton, Saoirse Ronan, Jason Schwartzman, Léa Seydoux, Tilda Swinton, Tom Wilkinson, Owen Wilson, Tony Revolori, Larry Pine, Giselda Volodi, Florian Lukas, Karl Markovics, Neal Huff, Bob Balaban, Fisher Stevens, Wally Wolodarsky, Waris Ahluwalia, Daniel Steiner, Lisa Kreuzer, Carl Sprague, Lucas Hedges	
M A R C H	14	Bad Words	Darko Entertainment / Focus Features	Jason Bateman (director); Andrew Dodge (screenplay); Jason Bateman, Kathryn Hahn, Rohan Chand, Ben Falcone, Philip Baker Hall, Allison Janney, Rachael Harris, Judith Hoag, Beth Grant, Patricia Belcher, Anjul Nigam, Bob Stephenson, Steve Witting, Ethan Dizon, Madison Hu, Greg Cromer, Michael Patrick McGill	
M A R C H	14	Better Living Through Chemistry	Samuel Goldwyn Films	David Posamentier, Geoff Moore (director/screenplay); Sam Rockwell, Olivia Wilde, Michelle Monaghan, Ben Schwartz, Ken Howard, Ray Liotta, Jane Fonda, Norbert Leo Butz, Peter Jacobson	
M A R C H	14	Need for Speed	Touchstone Pictures / DreamWorks Pictures / Reliance Entertainment / Electronic Arts	Scott Waugh (director); George Gatins (screenplay); Aaron Paul, Dominic Cooper, Scott Mescudi, Imogen Poots, Ramón Rodríguez, Michael Keaton, Rami Malek, Harrison Gilbertson, Dakota Johnson, Carmela Zumbado, Nick Chinlund, Buddy Joe Hooker, Kanin Howell, E. Roger Mitchell, Antoni Corone, John Gatins, Tierre Turner, Thomas Rosales Jr., Stevie Ray Dallimore, Chad Randall, Logan Holladay, Jalil Jay Lynch, Rich Rutherford, Tony Brakohiapa, Brent Fletcher, Paul Dallenbach	
M A R C H	14	The Single Moms Club	Lionsgate / Tyler Perry Studios	Tyler Perry (director/screenplay); Nia Long, Amy Smart, Cocoa Brown, Terry Crews, William Levy, Wendi McLendon-Covey, Ryan Eggold, Zulay Henao, Tyler Perry, Eddie Cibrian, Marlene Forte, Sean Carrigan, Carmen Argenziano, Niki Spiridakos, Cassie Brennan, Massai Z. Dorsey, Vanessa Velasco, DeVion Harris, Brandon Olive	
M A R C H	14	Veronica Mars	Warner Bros. Pictures	Rob Thomas (director/screenplay); Diane Ruggiero (screenplay); Kristen Bell, Jason Dohring, Krysten Ritter, Ryan Hansen, Francis Capra, Percy Daggs III, Chris Lowell, Tina Majorino, Enrico Colantoni, Gaby Hoffmann, Jerry O'Connell, Brandon Hillock, Martin Starr, Ken Marino, Max Greenfield, Amanda Noret, Daran Norris, Andrea Estella, Maury Sterling, Sam Huntington, Jessica Camacho, Lisa Thornhill, Christine Lakin, Jamie Lee Curtis, Matthew Arkin, Helen Slayton-Hughes, Meredith Eaton, Ryan Lane, Ira Glass, Harvey Levin, Justin Long, Kyle Bornheimer, Dax Shepard, James Franco, Eden Sher, Dave "Gruber" Allen, Alejandro Escovedo, Eddie Jemison, Melissa Sue Anderson, Daniel N. Butler, Sean McNabb	
M A R C H	21	Cheap Thrills	Drafthouse Films	E. L. Katz (director); Trent Haaga, David Chirchirillo (screenplay); Pat Healy, Sara Paxton, Ethan Embry, David Koechner	
M A R C H	21	Divergent	Summit Entertainment / Red Wagon Entertainment	Neil Burger (director); Evan Daugherty, Vanessa Taylor (screenplay); Shailene Woodley, Theo James, Ashley Judd, Jai Courtney, Ray Stevenson, Zoë Kravitz, Miles Teller, Tony Goldwyn, Maggie Q, Kate Winslet, Mekhi Phifer, Ben Lloyd-Hughes, Christian Madsen, Amy Newbold, Ben Lamb, Rotimi, Justine Wachsberger, Alice Bowden, Cleo Anthony, Scott Roberts, Casimere Jollette, Parker Mack, J.J. Perry	
M A R C H	21	God's Not Dead	Pure Flix Entertainment	Harold Cronk (director); Cary Solomon, Chuck Konzelman (screenplay); Kevin Sorbo, Shane Harper, David A. R. White, Dean Cain, Newsboys, Willie Robertson, Korie Robertson	
M A R C H	21	Muppets Most Wanted	Walt Disney Pictures / Mandeville Films	James Bobin (director/screenplay); Nicholas Stoller (screenplay); Ricky Gervais, Ty Burrell, Tina Fey, Steve Whitmire, Eric Jacobson, Dave Goelz, Bill Barretta, David Rudman, Matt Vogel, Peter Linz, Tony Bennett, Hugh Bonneville, Jemaine Clement, Sean Combs, Rob Corddry, Mackenzie Crook, Celine Dion, Lady Gaga, Zach Galifianakis, Josh Groban, Salma Hayek, Tom Hiddleston, Tom Hollander, Toby Jones, Frank Langella, Ray Liotta, Ross Lynch, James McAvoy, Chloë Grace Moretz, Dylan "Hornswoggle" Postl, Usher Raymond, Miranda Richardson, Saoirse Ronan, Til Schweiger, Russell Tovey, Danny Trejo, Stanley Tucci, Christoph Waltz, Louise Gold, Nigel Plaskitt, Mak Wilson, Warrick Brownlow-Pike, Don Austen, Dave Chapman, Marcus Clarke, Richard Coombs, Andy Heath, Fiona Wilson, David Alan Barclay, Tim Blaney, Julianne Buescher, Tyler Bunch, Kevin Carlson, Alice Dinnean, Bruce Lanoil, Michelan Sisti, Dexter Fletcher, Elisa Gabrielli, Nick Kellington, Bridgit Mendler, Debby Ryan, Peter Serafinowicz, Jake Short, Raymond Waring, Tyrel Jackson Williams	
M A R C H	21	50 to 1	Ten Furlongs	Jim Wilson (director/screenplay); Faith Conroy (screenplay); Skeet Ulrich, Christian Kane, William Devane, Madelyn Deutch, Todd Lowe, Calvin Borel	
M A R C H	28	Noah	Paramount Pictures / Regency Enterprises	Darren Aronofsky (director/screenplay), Ari Handel (screenplay); Russell Crowe, Jennifer Connelly, Ray Winstone, Emma Watson, Anthony Hopkins, Logan Lerman, Douglas Booth, Nick Nolte, Mark Margolis, Kevin Durand, Marton Csokas, Finn Wittrock, Madison Davenport, Gavin Casalegno, Dakota Goyo, Ariane Rinehart, Sophie Nyweide, Don Harvey, Sami Gayle, Barry Sloane, Arna Magnea Danks, Frank Langella, Jóhannes Haukur Jóhannesson, Stephen Stanton	
M A R C H	28	Sabotage	Open Road Films	David Ayer (director/screenplay); Skip Woods (screenplay); Arnold Schwarzenegger, Sam Worthington, Olivia Williams, Terrence Howard, Joe Manganiello, Harold Perrineau, Martin Donovan, Max Martini, Josh Holloway, Mireille Enos, Kevin Vance, Troy Garity, Maurice Compte, Tim Ware, Gary Grubbs, Kendrick Cross, Andrew Comrie-Picard, Mario Ramirez Reyes, Luis Moncada, Daniel Moncada, Sope Aluko, Ralf Moeller	

== April–June ==
Opening		Title	Production company	Cast and crew	Ref.
A P R I L	1	15 to Life: Kenneth's Story	Hitplay Productions	Nadine Pequeneza (director, writer)	
A P R I L	4	The Ladies of the House	Gravitas Ventures	John Stuart Wildman (director/screenplay); Justina Walford (screenplay); Farah White, Melodie Sisk, Brina Palencia, Belladonna	
A P R I L	4	Alien Abduction	IFC Midnight	Matty Beckerman (director); Robert Lewis (screenplay); Katherine Sigismund, Corey Eid, Riley Polanski, Jillian Clare, Jeff Bowser, Peter Holden	
A P R I L	4	Captain America: The Winter Soldier	Marvel Studios	Anthony Russo, Joe Russo (directors); Christopher Markus, Stephen McFeely (screenplay); Chris Evans, Scarlett Johansson, Sebastian Stan, Anthony Mackie, Cobie Smulders, Frank Grillo, Emily VanCamp, Hayley Atwell, Toby Jones, Jenny Agutter, Robert Redford, Samuel L. Jackson, Maximiliano Hernandez, Stan Lee, Callan Mulvey, Bernard White, Alan Dale, Chin Han, Garry Shandling, Georges St. Pierre, Brian Duffy, Adetokumboh M'Cormack, Aaron Himelstein, Joe Russo, Christopher Markus, Stephen McFeely, Pat Healy, Ed Brubaker, DC Pierson, Danny Pudi, Branka Katić, Angela Russo-Otstot, Evan Parke, Steven Culp, Wendy Hoopes, Ethan Rains, Dominic Rains, Robert Clotworthy, Gary Sinise, Henry Goodman, Thomas Kretschmann, Elizabeth Olsen, Nestor Serrano, Aaron Taylor-Johnson	
A P R I L	4	In the Blood	Anchor Bay Films	John Stockwell (director); James Robert Johnston, Bennett Yellin (screenplay); Gina Carano, Cam Gigandet, Ismael Cruz Córdova, Luis Guzmán, Treat Williams, Amaury Nolasco, Stephen Lang, Danny Trejo	
A P R I L	4	Jinn	Freestyle Releasing	Ajmal Zaheer Ahmad (director/screenplay); Dominic Rains, Ray Park, William Atherton, Faran Tahir, Serinda Swan	
A P R I L	11	Draft Day	Summit Entertainment / OddLot Entertainment	Ivan Reitman (director); Rajiv Joseph, Scott Rothman (screenplay); Kevin Costner, Jennifer Garner, Denis Leary, Frank Langella, Sam Elliott, Ellen Burstyn, Chadwick Boseman, Sean Combs, Terry Crews, Rosanna Arquette, W. Earl Brown, Kevin Dunn, Arian Foster, Brad William Henke, Chi McBride, Griffin Newman, Josh Pence, David Ramsey, Patrick St. Esprit, Timothy Simons, Tom Welling, Wade Williams, Wallace Langham, Christopher Cousins, Patrick Breen, Stephen Hill, Jim Brewer, Pat Healy, Erin Darke, Deion Sanders, Mike Mayock, Alex Mack, John Heffernan, Rebecca Haarlow, Jeff Darlington, Mike Florio, Seth Wickersham, Phil Taylor, TJ Ward, D'Qwell Jackson, Chris Berman, Russ Brandon, Jim Brown, Rich Eisen, Roger Goodell, Jon Gruden, Bernie Kosar, Ray Lewis, Alex Marvez, Jacob Bertrand, John Candy, James Durbin, Brian Haley, Tony Rizzo, Aaron Goldhammer	
A P R I L	11	Oculus	Relativity Media	Mike Flanagan (director/screenplay); Jeff Howard (screenplay); Karen Gillan, Brenton Thwaites, Katee Sackhoff, Rory Cochrane, Annalise Basso, Garrett Ryan Ewald, James Lafferty, Miguel Sandoval, Kate Siegel, Scott Graham, Justin Gordon	
A P R I L	11	Rio 2	20th Century Fox / Blue Sky Studios	Carlos Saldanha (director); Don Rhymer, Carlos Kotkin, Jenny Bicks, Yoni Brenner (screenplay); Jesse Eisenberg, Anne Hathaway, Jemaine Clement, Kristin Chenoweth, will.i.am, George Lopez, Bruno Mars, Leslie Mann, Rodrigo Santoro, Rita Moreno, Tracy Morgan, Jake T. Austin, Andy García, Jamie Foxx, Miguel Ferrer, Rachel Crow, Amandla Stenberg, Pierce Gagnon, Janelle Monáe, Natalie Morales, Bebel Gilberto, Philip Lawrence, Jeff Garcia, Sergio Mendes, Carlinhos Brown, Jim Conroy, Jason Harris, Amy Heidemann, Kate Micucci, Marco Antonio Regil, Carlos Saldanha, Randy Thom, Mauro Blanco, Rif Hutton, Phil Miler, Edie Mirman, Jackeline Olivier, Byron Thames	
A P R I L	15	Asian School Girls	The Asylum	Lawrence Silverstein (director); Tim Culley (screenplay); Minnie Scarlet, Sam Aotaki, Catherine Hyein Kim, Devin Lung, Belle Hengsathorn	
A P R I L	16	Heaven Is for Real	TriStar Pictures	Randall Wallace (director); Randall Wallace, Christopher Parker (screenplay); Greg Kinnear, Kelly Reilly, Connor Corum, Margo Martindale, Thomas Haden Church, Jacob Vargas, Rob Moran, Nancy Sorel, Darcy Fehr, Bryan Clark, Kevin Anderson, Lane Styles, Thanya Romero, Danso Gordon, Vivian Winther, Pete Hudson, Jon Ted Wynne, Darren Feibel, Mike Bell, Mitch Ainley, Ali Tataryn	
A P R I L	18	Authors Anonymous	Screen Media Films	Ellie Kanner (director); David Congalton (screenplay); Kaley Cuoco, Chris Klein, Dennis Farina, Jonathan Bennett, Tricia Helfer, Jonathan Banks, Dylan Walsh, Teri Polo	
A P R I L	18	A Haunted House 2	Open Road Films	Michael Tiddes (director); Marlon Wayans, Rick Alvarez (screenplay); Marlon Wayans, Jaime Pressly, Essence Atkins, Gabriel Iglesias, Missi Pyle, Ashley Rickards, Affion Crockett, Steele Stebbins, Rick Overton, Hayes MacArthur, Dave Sheridan, Cedric the Entertainer, Kurt Carley, Tom Virtue, Kym Whitley, Gregg Wayans, Taylor John Smith, Mark Heidelberger	
A P R I L	18	Kid Cannabis	Well Go USA Entertainment	John Stockwell (director/screenplay); Jonathan Daniel Brown, Kenny Wormald, Aaron Yoo, Ron Perlman, John C. McGinley	
A P R I L	18	Transcendence	Warner Bros. Pictures / Alcon Entertainment	Wally Pfister (director); Jack Paglen (screenplay); Johnny Depp, Morgan Freeman, Rebecca Hall, Kate Mara, Cillian Murphy, Cole Hauser, Paul Bettany, Clifton Collins Jr., Cory Hardrict, Falk Hentschel, Josh Stewart, Luce Rains, Fernando Chien, Steven Liu, Xander Berkeley, Lukas Haas, Wallace Langham, Christopher Gartin, Olivia Dudley, Lauren Sivan, Antonio Del Prete, Seth Adkins, Callum Blue, Elon Musk	
A P R I L	18	13 Sins	Dimension Films	Daniel Stamm (director); David Birke, Daniel Stamm (screenplay); Mark Webber, Devon Graye, Tom Bower, Rutina Wesley, Pruitt Taylor Vince, Ron Perlman	
A P R I L	25	Brick Mansions	Relativity Media	Camille Delamarre (director); Luc Besson (screenplay); Paul Walker, David Belle, RZA, Goûchy Boy, Catalina Denis, Carlo Rota	
A P R I L	25	The Other Woman	20th Century Fox	Nick Cassavetes (director); Melissa Stack (screenplay); Cameron Diaz, Leslie Mann, Kate Upton, Nikolaj Coster-Waldau, Nicki Minaj, Taylor Kinney, Don Johnson, David Thornton, Olivia Culpo, Radio Man, Dan Bilzerian, London Elise Kress, Maria-Christina Oliveras, Shade Rupe, Brock Yurich, Alyshia Ochse, Victor Cruz, Meki Saldana	
A P R I L	25	Walking with the Enemy	Liberty Studios	Mark Schmidt (director); Kenny Golde (screenplay); Jonas Armstrong, Hannah Tointon, Ben Kingsley	
M A Y	2	The Amazing Spider-Man 2	Columbia Pictures / Marvel Entertainment	Marc Webb (director); Alex Kurtzman, Roberto Orci, Jeff Pinkner (screenplay); Andrew Garfield, Emma Stone, Jamie Foxx, Dane DeHaan, Campbell Scott, Embeth Davidtz, Colm Feore, Paul Giamatti, Sally Field, Felicity Jones, Marton Csokas, Louis Cancelmi, Max Charles, B.J. Novak, Sarah Gadon, Michael Massee, Bill Heck, Aidy Bryant, Anslem Richardson, James Colby, Skyler Gisondo, Robert Newman, Adrian Martinez, Timothy Adams, Pat Kiernan, Daniel Gerroll, Brian McElhaney, JD Walsh, Stan Lee, Radio Man, Chris Cooper, Frank Deal, Denis Leary, Martin Sheen	
M A Y	2	Bad Johnson	Gravitas Ventures	Huck Botko (director); Jeff Tetreault (screenplay); Cam Gigandet, Nick Thune, Jamie Chung, Katherine Cunningham, Kevin Miller	
M A Y	2	Decoding Annie Parker	Entertainment One Films	Steven Bernstein (director/screenplay); Michael Moss, Adam Bernstein (screenplay); Samantha Morton, Alice Eve, Maggie Grace, Rashida Jones, Chris Mulkey, Aaron Paul, Richard Schiff, Marley Shelton, Corey Stoll, Bradley Whitford, Helen Hunt, Bob Gunton, Ben McKenzie, Mageina Tovah, James Tupper, Kate Micucci, Spencer Garrett, Robert Pine, Rizwan Manji, Benjamin James Stockham, Ryan Wynott, Olivia Rose Keegan, Ajay Mehta, Chad Lindberg, Scott Klace, Joanne Baron, Johnathan Brownlee, Geoffrey Gould	
M A Y	2	Walk of Shame	Focus Features / Lakeshore Entertainment / Sidney Kimmel Entertainment	Steven Brill (director/screenplay); Elizabeth Banks, James Marsden, Gillian Jacobs, Sarah Wright Olsen, Ethan Suplee, Bill Barr, Ken Davitian, Lawrence Gilliard Jr., Alphonso McAuley, Da'Vone McDonald, Eric Etebari, Oliver Hudson, Carol Mansell, Bryan Callen, Tig Notaro, Willie Garson, Liz Carey, Brandon Scott, Ian Roberts, Kevin Nealon, Jerry Minor, Niecy Nash, Eve Brenner, P.J. Byrne, John Farley, Richard Cabral, Vic Chao, Donnie Smith, Gillian Vigman, Elizabeth Chomko, Steven Brill	
M A Y	9	Devil's Knot	Image Entertainment	Atom Egoyan (director); Paul Harris Boardman, Scott Derrickson (screenplay); Colin Firth, Reese Witherspoon, Dane DeHaan, Mireille Enos, Bruce Greenwood, Elias Koteas, Stephen Moyer, Alessandro Nivola, Amy Ryan, Martin Henderson, Kevin Durand, Gary Grubbs, Collette Wolfe, Kristoffer Polaha, Rex Linn, Matt Letscher, Michael Gladis, Brian Howe, Robert Baker, Wilbur Fitzgerald, Jet Jurgensmeyer, Jody Thompson, Anessa Ramsey, Gary Weeks, Joe Berlinger, Bruce Sinofsky, Mike Pniewski, Brandon Spink, Paul Boardman Jr., Kristopher Higgins, James Hamrick, Seth Meriwether, Ted Huckabee, Kerry Cahill	
M A Y	9	God's Pocket	IFC Films	John Slattery (director/screenplay); Alex Metcalf (screenplay); Philip Seymour Hoffman, Richard Jenkins, Christina Hendricks, John Turturro, Eddie Marsan, Peter Gerety, Caleb Landry Jones, Domenick Lombardozzi, Joyce Van Patten, Molly Price, Lenny Venito, Glenn Fleshler, Arthur French, Danny Mastrogiorgio, Michael Drayer, Christopher McCann, Sophia Takal, Patrick Murney, Michael Rogers, Bridget Barkan, Prudence Wright Holmes, Matthew Lawler, Eddie McGee	
M A Y	9	Moms' Night Out	TriStar Pictures	The Erwin Brothers (directors); Andrea Gyertson Nasfell, Jon Erwin (screenplay); Sarah Drew, Sean Astin, Patricia Heaton, David Hunt, Andrea Logan White, Trace Adkins, Harry Shum Jr., Abbie Cobb, Robert Amaya, Kevin Downes, Alex Kendrick, Sammi Hanratty, Michael Leone, Shiloh Nelson, Brett Rice, Rhoda Griffis, Anjelah Johnson-Reyes, Lance Nichols, Jason Burkey, Andrew Erwin, Jon Erwin, Lou Ferrigno, Kerri Pomarolli	
M A Y	9	Neighbors	Universal Pictures	Nicholas Stoller (director); Andrew J. Cohen, Brendan O'Brien (screenplay); Seth Rogen, Zac Efron, Rose Byrne, Christopher Mintz-Plasse, Dave Franco, Ike Barinholtz, Carla Gallo, Jerrod Carmichael, Craig Roberts, Lisa Kudrow, Hannibal Buress, Halston Sage, Ali Cobrin, Jason Mantzoukas, Brian Huskey, Liz Cackowski, Jesse Heiman, Randall Park, Natasha Leggero, Andy Samberg, Akiva Schaffer, Jorma Taccone, Adam DeVine, Blake Anderson, Anders Holm, Kyle Newacheck, Jake Johnson, Steve Carell	
M A Y	9	Stage Fright	Entertainment One	Jerome Sable (director/screenplay); Allie MacDonald, Douglas Smith, Brandon Uranowitz, Minnie Driver, Meat Loaf Aday	
M A Y	16	Godzilla	Warner Bros. Pictures / Legendary Pictures	Gareth Edwards (director); Max Borenstein (screenplay); Aaron Taylor-Johnson, Ken Watanabe, Elizabeth Olsen, Juliette Binoche, Sally Hawkins, David Strathairn, Bryan Cranston, T.J. Storm, Richard T. Jones, Victor Rasuk, Patrick Sabongui, Jared Keeso, Catherine Lough Haggquist, Eric Keenleyside, Ken Yamamura, Garry Chalk, Hiro Kanagawa, Terry Chen, Akira Takarada, Brian Markinson, Ty Olsson, Al Sapienza, Kurt Max Runte, Peter Shinkoda, Christian Tessier, Jill Teed, Dean Redman, Taylor Nichols, Eli Goree, Josh Cowdery, Keo Woolford, Marci T. House, Chris Shields, Erik Aadahl, Mike Dopud, Matt Cross, Lee Ross, Carson Bolde, Jake Cunanan, Warren Takeuchi, Yuki Morita, Gardiner Millar	
M A Y	16	Million Dollar Arm	Walt Disney Pictures / Roth Films / Mayhem Pictures	Craig Gillespie (director); Tom McCarthy (screenplay); Jon Hamm, Aasif Mandvi, Bill Paxton, Suraj Sharma, Lake Bell, Alan Arkin, Madhur Mittal, Pitobash Tripathy, Tzi Ma, Darshan Jariwala, Sudev Nair, Gregory Alan Williams, Allyn Rachel, Rey Maualuga, Bar Paly, Al Sapienza, Pawan Chopra, Ravi Naidu, Mike Pniewski, Shane Callahan, Jayson Stark, Karl Ravech, Steve Levy, Ken Rosenthal, Barry Larkin, Curt Schilling, Tom Verducci, Tara Sharma	
M A Y	23	The Angriest Man in Brooklyn	Lionsgate	Phil Alden Robinson (director); Daniel Taplitz (screenplay); Robin Williams, Mila Kunis, Peter Dinklage, James Earl Jones, Melissa Leo, Hamish Linklater, Sutton Foster, Richard Kind, Daniel Raymont, Chris Gethard, Jerry Adler, Bob Dishy, Louis C.K., Isiah Whitlock Jr., Da'Vine Joy Randolph, Jeremie Harris, Lee Garlington, Olga Merediz, Hank Chen, Kirk Taylor, Tarek Anthony Jabre, Marcello Thedford	
M A Y	23	Blended	Warner Bros. Pictures / Happy Madison Productions	Frank Coraci (director); Ivan Menchell, Clare Sera (screenplay); Adam Sandler, Drew Barrymore, Kevin Nealon, Terry Crews, Wendi McLendon-Covey, Bella Thorne, Joel McHale, Jessica Lowe, Emma Fuhrmann, Alyvia Alyn Lind, Shaquille O'Neal, Dan Patrick, Jacqueline Sandler, Sunny Sandler, Sadie Sandler, Alexis Arquette, Susan Yeagley, Mary Pat Gleason, Dale Steyn, Allen Covert, Tim Herlihy, Jared Sandler, Lauren Lapkus, Jonathan Loughran, Rob Moran, Michael Buscemi, Bill Romanowski, Abdoulaye N'Gom, Braxton Beckham, Kyle Red Silverstein, Zak Henri	
M A Y	23	Cold in July	IFC Films	Jim Mickle (director/screenplay); Nick Damici (screenplay); Michael C. Hall, Sam Shepard, Vinessa Shaw, Nick Damici, Wyatt Russell, Don Johnson	
M A Y	23	X-Men: Days of Future Past	20th Century Fox / Bad Hat Harry Productions / Marvel Entertainment / The Donners' Company	Bryan Singer (director); Simon Kinberg (screenplay); Hugh Jackman, James McAvoy, Michael Fassbender, Jennifer Lawrence, Halle Berry, Anna Paquin, Elliot Page, Peter Dinklage, Ian McKellen, Patrick Stewart, Nicholas Hoult, Shawn Ashmore, Omar Sy, Evan Peters, Josh Helman, Daniel Cudmore, Fan Bingbing, Adan Canto, Booboo Stewart, Famke Janssen, James Marsden, Lucas Till, Evan Jonigkeit, Mark Camacho, Mike Dopud, Gregg Lowe, Alex Ivanovici, Michael Lerner, Chris Claremont, Len Wein, Zabryna Guevara, Angela Galuppo, Johnny Tran, Gregory Hlady, Jason Deline, Karine Vanasse, Arthur Holden, Sean Curley, Susanna Fournier, John Moore, Moe Jeudy-Lamour, Harry Standjofski, Mizinga Mwinga, Brian Cox, Kelsey Grammer, Lance Kinsey, Morgan Lily, Bryan Singer, Jimmy Star	
M A Y	25	The Normal Heart	HBO Films / 20th Century Fox Television / Blumhouse Productions / Plan B Entertainment / Ryan Murphy Productions	Ryan Murphy (director); Larry Kramer (screenplay); Mark Ruffalo, Matt Bomer, Taylor Kitsch, Jim Parsons, Julia Roberts, Alfred Molina, Joe Mantello, BD Wong, Jonathan Groff, Stephen Spinella, Finn Wittrock, Denis O'Hare, Corey Stoll, Danielle Ferland, Chris Sullivan, Remy Auberjonois, Frank De Julio, Adam B. Shapiro, William DeMeritt, Sean Meehan, John Mainieri, Corey Brill, Armand Schultz, Rebecca Watson, Wenne Alton Davis, Richard Prioleau, Patrick Woodall, Brent Glazer	
M A Y	30	Maleficent	Walt Disney Pictures / Roth Films	Robert Stromberg (director); Linda Woolverton (screenplay); Angelina Jolie, Sharlto Copley, Elle Fanning, Sam Riley, Imelda Staunton, Juno Temple, Lesley Manville, Brenton Thwaites, Kenneth Cranham, Hannah New, Isobelle Molloy, Ella Purnell, Angus Wright, Oliver Maltman, Anthony May, Stephan Chase, Jamie Maclachlan, Vivienne Jolie-Pitt, Eleanor Worthington-Cox, John Macmillan, Tim Treloar, Marama Corlett, Steven Cree, Janet McTeer, Michael Higgins, Jackson Bews	
M A Y	30	A Million Ways to Die in the West	Universal Pictures / Media Rights Capital / Fuzzy Door Productions / Bluegrass Films	Seth MacFarlane (director/screenplay); Alec Sulkin, Wellesley Wild (screenplay); Seth MacFarlane, Charlize Theron, Amanda Seyfried, Giovanni Ribisi, Neil Patrick Harris, Sarah Silverman, Liam Neeson, Wes Studi, Matt Clark, Evan Jones, Rex Linn, Alex Borstein, Ralph Garman, John Aylward, Jay Patterson, Amick Byram, Dennis Haskins, Christopher Lloyd, Gilbert Gottfried, Ewan McGregor, John Michael Higgins, Julius Sharpe, Alec Sulkin, Tatanka Means, Tait Fletcher, Preston Bailey, Rupert Boneham, Josh Brolin, Steve Callaghan, Rodney Carrington, Challen Cates, Kaley Cuoco, Jamie Foxx, Bill Maher, Allyn Rachel, Ryan Reynolds, Patrick Stewart, Mae Whitman, Christopher Hagen, Aaron McPherson, Brett Rickaby, Jean Effron, Dylan Kenin, Mike Salazar	
M A Y	30	Chef	Aldamista Entertainment/ Fairview Entertainment/ Fetisov Teterin Films/ Open Road Films	Jon Favreau (director/screenplay); Jon Favreau, Sofía Vergara, John Leguizamo, Scarlett Johansson, Dustin Hoffman. Bobby Cannavale, Emjay Anthony, Oliver Platt, Amy Sedaris, Robert Downey Jr., Russell Peters, Gary Clark Jr., Roy Choi, Colombe Jacobsen-Derstine, Noa Lindberg, Ryan McInerney, Jimmy Star, Benjamin Jacob, Aaron Franklin	
J U N E	6	Edge of Tomorrow	Warner Bros. Pictures / Village Roadshow Pictures / RatPac Entertainment / 3 Arts Entertainment	Doug Liman (director); Christopher McQuarrie, Jez Butterworth, John-Henry Butterworth (screenplay); Tom Cruise, Emily Blunt, Bill Paxton, Brendan Gleeson, Jonas Armstrong, Tony Way, Kick Gurry, Franz Drameh, Dragomir Mrsic, Charlotte Riley, Masayoshi Haneda, Noah Taylor, Lara Pulver, Madeleine Mantock, Beth Goddard, Martin Hyder, Tommy Campbell, Harry Landis, Anna Botting, Erin Burnett, David Kaye, Hillary Clinton, François Hollande, Marianne Jean-Baptiste, Olivier Knox, Chi Lewis-Parry, Sandeep Mohan, Jeremy Piven	
J U N E	6	The Fault in Our Stars	20th Century Fox	Josh Boone (director); Scott Neustadter, Michael H. Weber (screenplay); Shailene Woodley, Ansel Elgort, Laura Dern, Sam Trammell, Nat Wolff, Willem Dafoe, Lotte Verbeek, Mike Birbiglia, Carole Weyers, Daniel Booko, Jim Pirri, Jean Gilpin, Joey Richter, Nicholas Guest, John Green, Ana Dela Cruz, Randy Kovitz, David Whalen, Milica Govich, Emily Peachey, Emily Bach	
J U N E	6	Ping Pong Summer	Millennium Entertainment	Michael Tully (director/screenplay); Marcello Conte, Myles Massey, Emmi Shockley, Joe McCaughtry, Andy Riddle, Helena Seabrook, Maddie Howard, Lea Thompson, John Hannah, Judah Friedlander, Amy Sedaris, Susan Sarandon	
J U N E	13	22 Jump Street	Columbia Pictures / Metro-Goldwyn-Mayer / Original Film	Phil Lord, Christopher Miller (directors); Michael Bacall, Oren Uziel, Rodney Rothman (screenplay); Jonah Hill, Channing Tatum, Peter Stormare, Ice Cube, Wyatt Russell, Amber Stevens, Jillian Bell, Keith Lucas, Kenny Lucas, Nick Offerman, Jimmy Tatro, Caroline Aaron, Craig Roberts, Marc Evan Jackson, Joe Chrest, Rye Rye, Johnny Pemberton, Dax Flame, Diplo, H. Jon Benjamin, Anna Faris, Will Forte, Dave Franco, Bill Hader, Patton Oswalt, Queen Latifah, Rob Riggle, Seth Rogen, Richard Grieco, Dustin Nguyen, Steven Williams, Eddie Perez, Mickey Facchinello, Steve Terada, Matt Vogel, Eddie Fernandez, Stanley Wong	
J U N E	13	Hellion	IFC Films	Kat Candler (director/screenplay); Aaron Paul, Juliette Lewis, Josh Wiggins, Deke Garner, Jonny Mars, Annalee Jefferies	
J U N E	13	How to Train Your Dragon 2	20th Century Fox / DreamWorks Animation	Dean DeBlois (director/screenplay); Jay Baruchel, Cate Blanchett, Gerard Butler, Craig Ferguson, America Ferrera, Jonah Hill, Christopher Mintz-Plasse, T.J. Miller, Kristen Wiig, Djimon Hounsou, Kit Harington, Kieron Elliott, Gideon Emery, Simon Kassianides, Randy Thom, Julian Stone, Philip McGrade, Andrew Ableson	
J U N E	13	Lullaby	ARC Entertainment	Andrew Levitas (director/screenplay); Garrett Hedlund, Richard Jenkins, Jessica Brown Findlay, Anne Archer, Jennifer Hudson, Jessica Barden, Terrence Howard, Amy Adams	
J U N E	13	Murder 101	Upper Laventille Productions	Michael Phillip Edwards (director); Sheldon F. Robins (screenplay); Tom Sizemore, Dante Basco, Sheldon F. Robins, Paige La Pierre, Randy Irwin, Malaak Hattab, Percy Daggs, Greg Winter, Jamison Haase, Rai Moore, Jasmine Waltz	
J U N E	13	Obvious Child	A24 Films	Gillian Robespierre (director/screenplay); Jenny Slate, Jake Lacy, Gaby Hoffmann, Gabe Liedman, Richard Kind, Polly Draper, David Cross, Paul Briganti, Stephen Singer, Cindy Cheung, Ernest Mingione, Emily Tremaine, Stacey Sargeant, Karen Maine, Michael Bonfiglio	
J U N E	13	The Signal	Focus Features	William Eubank (director/screenplay); Carlyle Eubank, David Frigerio (screenplay); Brenton Thwaites, Olivia Cooke, Beau Knapp, Lin Shaye, Robert Longstreet, Laurence Fishburne	
J U N E	20	Jersey Boys	Warner Bros. Pictures / RatPac Entertainment / GK Films	Clint Eastwood (director); Marshall Brickman, Rick Elice (screenplay); John Lloyd Young, Erich Bergen, Michael Lomenda, Vincent Piazza, Christopher Walken, Kathrine Narducci, Freya Tingley, Mike Doyle, Johnny Cannizzaro, Jeremy Luke, Steve Monroe, James Madio, Steve Schirripa, Barry Livingston, Billy Gardell, Francesca Eastwood, Michael Patrick McGill, Jacqueline Mazarella, Ivar Brogger, Annika Noelle, Keith Loneker Sr., Kathryn Ann Hughes, Louis Lombardi, Joe Abraham, Meagan Holder, Sean Whalen, Jeremy Ratchford, Joe Howard, Matt Nolan, P.J. Ochlan, Renée Marino, Lou Volpe, Rob Marnell, Donnie Kehr, Joseph Russo, Erica Piccininni, Miles Aubrey, Troy Grant, Elizabeth Hunter, Grace Kelley	
J U N E	20	Think Like a Man Too	Screen Gems / Will Packer Productions	Tim Story (director); David A. Newman, Keith Merryman (screenplay); Michael Ealy, Jerry Ferrara, Meagan Good, Regina Hall, Taraji P. Henson, Terrence J, Romany Malco, Wendi McLendon-Covey, Gary Owen, Gabrielle Union, La La Anthony, Kevin Hart, Dennis Haysbert, Jenifer Lewis, David Walton, Adam Brody, Jim Piddock, Wendy Williams, Kelsey Grammer, Cheryl Hines, Luenell, Janina Gavankar, Carl Weathers, Caleel Harris, Angela E. Gibbs, Derek Watkins, George Wallace, Will Packer, Malea Rose, Pedro Miguel Arce, Chasty Ballesteros, Corey Holcomb, Floyd Mayweather Jr., Coco, Drake, Ronald B. DeVoe, Michael Bivins, Ndamukong Suh, Steve Terada, Dan Rossi	
J U N E	27	America: Imagine the World Without Her	Lionsgate	John Sullivan, Dinesh D'Souza (director/screenplay); Bruce Schooley (screenplay)	
J U N E	27	They Came Together	Lionsgate	David Wain (director/screenplay); Michael Showalter (screenplay); Paul Rudd, Amy Poehler, Cobie Smulders, Christopher Meloni, Max Greenfield, Bill Hader, Ellie Kemper, Jason Mantzoukas, Melanie Lynskey, Ed Helms, Michael Ian Black, Michaela Watkins, Randall Park, Teyonah Parris, David Wain, Jack McBrayer, Kenan Thompson, Ken Marino, Erinn Hayes, Skylar Gaertner, Zak Orth, Norah Jones, Adam Scott, John Stamos, Michael Murphy, Lynn Cohen, Jeffrey Dean Morgan, Michael Shannon, Judge Judy Sheindlin, John Hamburg, Jesse Harris, Seth Herzog, Craig Wedren	
J U N E	27	Transformers: Age of Extinction	Paramount Pictures	Michael Bay (director); Ehren Kruger (screenplay); Mark Wahlberg, Stanley Tucci, Kelsey Grammer, Nicola Peltz, Jack Reynor, Titus Welliver, Sophia Myles, Bingbing Li, T.J. Miller, James Bachman, Thomas Lennon, Charles Parnell, Erika Fong, Richard Riehle, Patrick Bristow, Cleo King, Kassem Gharaibeh, Jessica Gomes, Abigail Klein, Greg Anderson, Victoria Summer, Lin Po-hung, Kevin Covais, Michael Wong, Ray Lui, Ben Wang, Wu Gang, Peter Cullen, Frank Welker, John Goodman, Ken Watanabe, Robert Foxworth, John DiMaggio, Mark Ryan, Reno Wilson, Eric Bauza, Michael Bay	

== July–September ==
Opening		Title	Production company	Cast and crew	Ref.
J U L Y	2	Deliver Us from Evil	Screen Gems / Jerry Bruckheimer Films	Scott Derrickson (director/screenplay); Paul Harris Boardman (screenplay); Eric Bana, Édgar Ramírez, Olivia Munn, Sean Harris, Joel McHale, Chris Coy, Dorian Missick, Mike Houston, Lulu Wilson, Sean Nelson, Tijuana Ricks, John Cariani, Rhona Fox, Valentina Rendón, Olivia Horton, Scott Johnsen, Daniel Sauli, Antoinette LaVecchia, Aidan Gemme, Jenna Gavigan, Oliver Wadsworth	
J U L Y	2	Earth to Echo	Relativity Media	Dave Green (director); Henry Gayden (screenplay); Teo Halm, Brian "Astro" Bradley, Reese C. Hartwig, Ella Linnea Wahlestedt, Jason Gray-Stanford, Algee Smith, Cassius Willis, Sonya Leslie, Kerry O'Malley, Virginia Louise Smith, Peter Mackenzie, Valerie Wildman, Mary Pat Gleason, Chris Wylde, Brooke Dillman, Myk Watford, Tiffany Espensen, Israel Broussard, Sean Carroll	
J U L Y	2	School Dance	Lionsgate	Nick Cannon (director/screenplay); Nile Evans (screenplay); Bobb'e J. Thompson, Luenell, Mike Epps, George Lopez, Lil Duval, Katt Williams, Wilmer Valderrama, Tiffany Haddish, Kristinia DeBarge, Lil Duval, Affion Crockett, Amber Rose, Efren Ramirez, Patrick Warburton, Kevin Hart, New Boyz, Melissa Molinaro, Kayla Collins, Jim Breuer, Jessica Kirson, Nick Cannon, Pete Davidson, Jasmine Sanders, Mike Moh, Dean Viana, The Rej3ctz, Juliann Alexander, Langston Higgins, Dashawn Blanks, Vivian Kindle, DJ D-Wrek	
J U L Y	2	Tammy	Warner Bros. Pictures / Gary Sanchez Productions	Ben Falcone (director/screenplay); Melissa McCarthy (screenplay); Melissa McCarthy, Susan Sarandon, Allison Janney, Gary Cole, Mark Duplass, Toni Collette, Sandra Oh, Nat Faxon, Dan Aykroyd, Kathy Bates, Ben Falcone, Sarah Baker, Mark L. Young, Mia Rose Frampton, Steve Little, Justin Smith, Penn Holderness, Rich Williams, Damon Jones	
J U L Y	11	Boyhood	IFC Films	Richard Linklater (director/screenplay); Patricia Arquette, Ellar Coltrane, Lorelei Linklater, Ethan Hawke, Libby Villari, Marco Perella, Brad Hawkins, Bill Wise, Charlie Sexton, Tom McTigue, Nick Krause, Savannah Welch, Brad Ausmus, Roger Clemens, Jamie Howard, Andrew Villarreal, Jenni Tooley, Richard Andrew Jones, Karen Jones, Zoe Graham, Barbara Chisholm, Cassidy Johnson, Richard Robichaux, Steven Chester Prince, Will Harris, Andrea Chen, Maximilian McNamara, Taylor Weaver, Jessi Mechler	
J U L Y	11	Dawn of the Planet of the Apes	20th Century Fox / Chernin Entertainment	Matt Reeves (director); Mark Bomback, Rick Jaffa, Amanda Silver (screenplay); Andy Serkis, Jason Clarke, Gary Oldman, Keri Russell, Toby Kebbell, Kodi Smit-McPhee, Kirk Acevedo, Nick Thurston, Terry Notary, Karin Konoval, Judy Greer, Enrique Murciano, Larramie "Doc" Shaw, Lee Ross, Keir O'Donnell, Kevin Rankin, Jocko Sims, Lombardo Boyar, J.D. Evermore, Michael Papajohn, Thomas Rosales Jr., Carol Sutton, Christopher Berry, Blake Nelson Boyd, James Franco, Sergio Kato, Barack Obama, Jon Eyez, Al Vicente, Richard King, Scott Alexander Lang	
J U L Y	11	Rage	Image Entertainment	Paco Cabezas (director); Jim Agnew, Sean Keller (screenplay); Nicolas Cage, Rachel Nichols, Max Ryan, Michael McGrady, Peter Stormare, Pasha D. Lychnikoff, Patrice Cols, Weston Cage, Max Fowler, Aubrey Peeples, Jack Falahee, Danny Glover, Ron Goleman, Michael Papajohn, Amir Zandi-Karimi, Jon Dannelley, Garrison Baugh-Tyler, Paul Sampson, Kevin Young, Elena Sanchez, Sarah Ann Schultz, Kelly Tippens, Judd Lormand	
J U L Y	11	Road to Paloma	WWE Studios	Jason Momoa (director/screenplay); Jonathan Hirschbein, Robert Homer Mollohan (screenplay); Jason Momoa, Robert Homer Mollohan, Lisa Bonet, Michael Raymond-James, Chris Browning, Timothy V. Murphy, Sarah Shahi, Wes Studi, Jill Wagner, Lance Henriksen, James Harvey Ward, Linden Chiles, Steve Reevis, Tanoai Reed, Waylon Williams	
J U L Y	11	Snowpiercer	The Weinstein Company	Bong Joon-ho (director/screenplay); Kelly Masterson (screenplay); Chris Evans, Song Kang-ho, Tilda Swinton, Jamie Bell, Octavia Spencer, Ewen Bremner, Go Ah-sung, John Hurt, Ed Harris, Alison Pill, Vlad Ivanov, Luke Pasqualino, Adnan Haskovic, Emma Levie, Stephen Park, Clark Middleton, Marcanthonee Jon Reis, Paul Lazar, Tómas Lemarquis, Kenny Doughty, Jean-Marc Rochette, Benjamin Legrand, Parry Shen	
J U L Y	18	I Origins	Fox Searchlight Pictures	Mike Cahill (director/screenplay); Michael Pitt, Brit Marling, Àstrid Bergès-Frisbey, Steven Yeun, Archie Panjabi. Cara Seymour, Venida Evans, William Mapother, Kashish Kumari, Ako	
J U L Y	18	Persecuted	Millennium Entertainment	Daniel Lusko (director/screenplay); James Remar, Bruce Davison, Dean Stockwell, Gretchen Carlson, Raoul Trujillo, Natalie Grant, Brad Stine, Fred Dalton Thompson	
J U L Y	18	Planes: Fire & Rescue	Walt Disney Pictures	Bobs Gannaway (director/screenplay); Jeffrey M. Howard (screenplay); Dane Cook, Ed Harris, Julie Bowen, Wes Studi, Brad Garrett, Teri Hatcher, Stacy Keach, Danny Mann, Regina King, Dale Dye, Curtis Armstrong, John Michael Higgins, Hal Holbrook, Cedric the Entertainer, Barry Corbin, Anne Meara, Jerry Stiller, Fred Willard, Matt Jones, Bryan Callen, Danny Pardo, Corri English, Kari Wahlgren, Patrick Warburton, René Auberjonois, Kevin Michael Richardson, Erik Estrada, Steve Schirripa, Brent Musburger, John Ratzenberger, Caroline Aaron, Kate Micucci, Brad Paisley, Fred Tatasciore	
J U L Y	18	The Purge: Anarchy	Universal Pictures / Blumhouse Productions / Platinum Dunes	James DeMonaco (director/screenplay); Frank Grillo, Carmen Ejogo, Zach Gilford, Kiele Sanchez, Michael K. Williams, Zoë Soul, Justina Machado, John Beasley, Jack Conley, Noel G., Cástulo Guerra, Edwin Hodge, Lakeith Stanfield, Roberta Valderrama, Niko Nicotera, Brandon Keener, Amy Price-Francis, Nicholas Gonzalez, Chad Morgan, Judith McConnell, Amy Paffrath, Dale Dye, Carla Jimenez, Cindy Robinson, Bel Hernandez, Lily Knight, Vick Sabitjian, Tyler Osterkamp, Nathan Clarkson	
J U L Y	18	Sex Tape	Columbia Pictures / Escape Artists	Jake Kasdan (director); Kate Angelo, Jason Segel, Nicholas Stoller (screenplay); Cameron Diaz, Jason Segel, Rob Corddry, Ellie Kemper, Rob Lowe, Nat Faxon, Nancy Lenehan, Randall Park, Kumail Nanjiani, Artemis Pebdani, Jolene Blalock, Dave "Gruber" Allen, Jack Black, Giselle Eisenberg, Harrison Holzer, Sebastian Hedges Thomas, Osmani Rodriguez	
J U L Y	18	Tiger Orange	Picture Stable / Wolfe Video	Wade Gasque (director); Mark Strano (screenplay); Frankie Valenti, Mark Strano, Gregory Marcel	
J U L Y	18	Wish I Was Here	Focus Features	Zach Braff (director/screenplay); Adam Braff (screenplay); Zach Braff, Donald Faison, Josh Gad, Pierce Gagnon, Ashley Greene, Kate Hudson, Joey King, Jim Parsons, Mandy Patinkin, Michael Weston, Alexander Chaplin, Allan Rich, James Avery, Leslie David Baker, Ato Essandoh, Matt Winston, Taylor Bagley, Bob Clendenin, Nichole Galicia	
J U L Y	25	And So It Goes	Clarius Entertainment	Rob Reiner (director); Mark Andrus (screenplay); Michael Douglas, Diane Keaton, Sterling Jerins, Annie Parisse, Yaya DaCosta, Scott Shepherd, Andy Karl, Frances Sternhagen, Frankie Valli, David Aaron Baker, Amirah Vann, Rob Reiner, Theo Stockman, Austin Lysy, Michael Terra, Sawyer Simpkins, Maxwell Simpkins, Maurice Jones, Luke Robertson, Meryl Williams, Johnny Tran, Albert Jones, Luis Figueroa, Paloma Guzman	
J U L Y	25	Happy Christmas	Magnolia Pictures	Joe Swanberg (director/screenplay); Anna Kendrick, Melanie Lynskey, Mark Webber, Lena Dunham, Joe Swanberg, Jude Swanberg, Kris Swanberg	
J U L Y	25	Hercules	Paramount Pictures / Metro-Goldwyn-Mayer	Brett Ratner (director); Ryan J. Condal, Evan Spiliotopoulos (screenplay); Dwayne Johnson, Ian McShane, Rufus Sewell, Aksel Hennie, Ingrid Bolsø Berdal, Reece Ritchie, Tobias Santelmann, Joseph Fiennes, Peter Mullan, Rebecca Ferguson, Isaac Andrews, Irina Shayk, John Hurt, Joe Anderson, Stephen Peacocke, Nick Moss, Robert Whitelock, Chris Fairbank, Ian Whyte, Karolina Szymczak, Barbara Palvin, Tonia Sotiropoulou, Robert Maillet, Erika Marozsán	
J U L Y	25	Lucy	Universal Pictures	Luc Besson (director/screenplay); Scarlett Johansson, Morgan Freeman, Choi Min-sik, Amr Waked, Julian Rhind-Tutt, Pilou Asbæk, Analeigh Tipton, Nicholas Phongpheth, Frederic Chau, Mason Lee, Ludovic Bernard, Luc Besson, Jimmy Star	
J U L Y	25	Magic in the Moonlight	Sony Pictures	Woody Allen (director/screenplay); Eileen Atkins, Colin Firth, Marcia Gay Harden, Hamish Linklater, Simon McBurney, Emma Stone, Jacki Weaver, Erica Leerhsen, Catherine McCormack, Jeremy Shamos, Antonia Clarke, Ute Lemper, Lionel Abelanski	
J U L Y	25	A Most Wanted Man	Lionsgate / Roadside Attractions	Anton Corbijn (director); Andrew Bovell (screenplay); Philip Seymour Hoffman, Rachel McAdams, Willem Dafoe, Robin Wright, Grigoriy Dobrygin, Homayoun Ershadi, Nina Hoss, Daniel Brühl, Derya Alabora, Herbert Grönemeyer, Martin Wuttke, Kostja Ullmann, Mehdi Dehbi, Vicky Krieps, Rainer Bock, Tamer Yiğit, Franz Hartwig, Vedat Erincin, Ursina Lardi, Anton Corbijn	
J U L Y	25	My Man Is a Loser	Lionsgate	Mike Young (director/screenplay); Michael Rapaport, Bryan Callen, Tika Sumpter, John Stamos, Kathy Searle, Heidi Armbruster, Sean Young, Diane Guerrero, Andrea Bordeaux, Maria Bartiromo, Jamie Jackson, Megan Reinking, Tech N9ne, Dale Resteghini, Ronnie Mund, Suze Orman, Jay Seals	
A U G U S T	1	Get on Up	Universal Pictures / Imagine Entertainment	Tate Taylor (director); Jez Butterworth, John-Henry Butterworth (screenplay); Chadwick Boseman, Nelsan Ellis, Dan Aykroyd, Viola Davis, Craig Robinson, Octavia Spencer, Lennie James, Fred Melamed, Jill Scott, Josh Hopkins, Brandon Smith, Tika Sumpter, Aunjanue Ellis, Tariq Trotter, Aloe Blacc, Keith Robinson, Nick Eversman, J.D. Evermore, Ahna O'Reilly, Liz Mikel, Michael Papajohn, Kirk Bovill, John Benjamin Hickey, Allison Janney, Billy Slaughter, Ralph Tresvant, Jamal Batiste, Jamarion Scott, Jordan Scott, Aaron Jay Rome, Clyde R. Jones, Julius William Tennon, Joe T. Blankenship, Aakomon Jones, Jamell Richardson, Justin Hall, David Carzell, Jason Davis, Charles R. Rooney	
A U G U S T	1	Guardians of the Galaxy	Marvel Studios	James Gunn (director/screenplay); Nicole Perlman (screenplay); Chris Pratt, Zoe Saldaña, Dave Bautista, Vin Diesel, Bradley Cooper, Lee Pace, Michael Rooker, Karen Gillan, Djimon Hounsou, John C. Reilly, Glenn Close, Benicio del Toro, Laura Haddock, Sean Gunn, Peter Serafinowicz, Christopher Fairbank, Wyatt Oleff, Gregg Henry, Melia Kreiling, Tom Proctor, Stan Lee, Sharif Atkins, Brendan Fehr, Tomas Arana, Mikaela Hoover, Emmett J. Scanlan, Spencer Wilding, Alexis Rodney, Nathan Fillion, Keeley Forsyth, Alexis Denisof, Enzo Cilenti, Ophelia Lovibond, Marama Corlett, Stephen Blackehart, Bruce Mackinnon, Ralph Ineson, Rob Zombie, John Brotherton, James Gunn, David Yarovesky, Tyler Bates, Josh Brolin, Jadey Duffield, Seth Green, Lloyd Kaufman, Sandeep Mohan, Jimmy Star, Paul Warren	
A U G U S T	1	Mercenaries	The Asylum	Christopher Douglas Ray (director); Edward DeRuiter (screenplay); Brigitte Nielsen, Vivica A. Fox, Kristanna Loken, Zoë Bell, Cynthia Rothrock, Nicole Bilderback, Damion Poitier, Morgan Benoit, Nickolai Stoilov, Carl Ciarfalio, Tim Abell, Tiffany Panhilason, Gerald Webb, Alexis Raich, Bernard Babish, Dmitri S. Boudrine, Kevin Fry, Antonio Cullari, Zedric Harris, Jenna Stone, Alicia Vigil, Scott Thomas Reynolds, Alyma Dorsey, Nick Gracer, Edward DeRuiter, Emily Lopato, aDAM Dorsey, Bill Voorhees, Eric D'Agostino	
A U G U S T	1	4 Minute Mile	Gravitas Ventures	Charles-Olivier Michaud (director); Jeff Van Wie, Josh Campbell (screenplay); Kelly Blatz, Richard Jenkins, Cam Gigandet, Analeigh Tipton, Rhys Coiro, Kim Basinger, Dylan Arnold, Blair Fowler	
A U G U S T	8	The Hundred-Foot Journey	Touchstone Pictures / DreamWorks Pictures / Reliance Entertainment / Participant Media / Amblin Entertainment	Lasse Hallström (director); Steven Knight (screenplay); Helen Mirren, Om Puri, Manish Dayal, Charlotte Le Bon, Amit Shah, Michel Blanc, Clément Sibony, Vincent Elbaz, Juhi Chawla, Rohan Chand, Masood Akhtar, Matyelok Gibbs, Farzana Dua Elahe, Dillon Mitra, Aria Pandya, Shuna Lemoine	
A U G U S T	8	Into the Storm	Warner Bros. Pictures / New Line Cinema / Village Roadshow Pictures	Steven Quale (director); John Swetnam (screenplay); Richard Armitage, Sarah Wayne Callies, Matt Walsh, Alycia Debnam-Carey, Arlen Escarpeta, Nathan Kress, Jeremy Sumpter, Stephanie Koenig, Kyle Davis, Jon Reep, Scott Lawrence, Kron Moore, London Elise Moore, Gary England, Don Lemon, Max Deacon, Lee Whittaker, David Drumm, Brandon Ruiter, Patrick Sarniak	
A U G U S T	8	Step Up: All In	Summit Entertainment	Trish Sie (director); John Swetnam (screenplay); Ryan Guzman, Briana Evigan, Stephen "tWitch" Boss, Misha Gabriel, Izabella Miko, Alyson Stoner, Adam Sevani, Chadd "Madd Chadd" Smith, Parris Goebel, Martin Lombard, Facundo Lombard, Cyrus "Glitch" Spencer, Karin Konoval, Jay Brazeau, Fulvio Cecere, Christie Laing, Celestina Aladekoba, Stephen "Stevo" Jones, David "Kid David" Shreibman, Mari Koda, Christopher Scott, Luis Rosado	
A U G U S T	8	Teenage Mutant Ninja Turtles	Paramount Pictures / Nickelodeon Movies / Platinum Dunes	Jonathan Liebesman (director); Josh Appelbaum, André Nemec, Evan Daugherty (screenplay); Megan Fox, Will Arnett, William Fichtner, Danny Woodburn, Abby Elliott, Noel Fisher, Jeremy Howard, Pete Ploszek, Alan Ritchson, Johnny Knoxville, Tony Shalhoub, Tohoru Masamune, Whoopi Goldberg, Minae Noji, Taran Killam, K. Todd Freeman, Paul Fitzgerald, Malina Weissman, Venida Evans, Harley Pasternak, Chris Wylde, Chance Kelly, Leyna Nguyen, Derek Mears, Kevin Eastman, Pete Gardner, Rakesh Shah	
A U G U S T	13	Let's Be Cops	20th Century Fox	Luke Greenfield (director/screenplay); Nicholas Thomas (screenplay); Damon Wayans, Jr., Jake Johnson, Rob Riggle, Nina Dobrev, James D'Arcy, Andy García, Keegan-Michael Key, Jon Lajoie, Tom Mardirosian, Natasha Leggero, Nelson Bonilla, Jeff Chase, Randall P. Havens, Briana Venskus, Jwaundace Candece, Patricia French, Matt "Horshu" Wiese, Luke Greenfield, Mary Jo Catlett, Chen Tang, Skye P. Marshall, Rebecca Koon, L. Warren Young, Brian Oerly, Alec Rayme	
A U G U S T	15	The Expendables 3	Lionsgate / Millennium Films / Nu Image	Patrick Hughes (director); Sylvester Stallone, Creighton Rothenberger, Katrin Benedikt (screenplay); Sylvester Stallone, Jason Statham, Antonio Banderas, Jet Li, Wesley Snipes, Dolph Lundgren, Kelsey Grammer, Randy Couture, Terry Crews, Kellan Lutz, Ronda Rousey, Glen Powell, Victor Ortiz, Robert Davi, Mel Gibson, Harrison Ford, Arnold Schwarzenegger, Natalie Burn, Sarai Givaty, Frank Pesce, Bashar Rahal	
A U G U S T	15	The Giver	The Weinstein Company	Phillip Noyce (director); Michael Mitnick, Robert B. Weide (screenplay); Jeff Bridges, Meryl Streep, Brenton Thwaites, Alexander Skarsgård, Katie Holmes, Taylor Swift, Cameron Monaghan, Odeya Rush, Emma Tremblay, Meganne Young, Thabo Rametsi, Jefferson Mays, Nick Uhas	
A U G U S T	15	Life After Beth	A24 Films	Jeff Baena (director/screenplay); Aubrey Plaza, Dane DeHaan, Molly Shannon, Cheryl Hines, Paul Reiser, Matthew Gray Gubler, John C. Reilly, Anna Kendrick, Thomas McDonell, Alia Shawkat, Paul Weitz, Jim O'Heir, Rob Delaney, Adam Pally, Garry Marshall, Peggy Miley, Bonnie Burroughs, Nick Offerman	
A U G U S T	15	The One I Love	RADiUS-TWC	Charlie McDowell (director); Justin Lader (screenplay); Mark Duplass, Elisabeth Moss, Ted Danson, Mary Steenburgen, Charlie McDowell, Mel Eslyn	
A U G U S T	22	If I Stay	Warner Bros. Pictures / New Line Cinema / Metro-Goldwyn-Mayer	R. J. Cutler (director); Shauna Cross (screenplay); Chloë Grace Moretz, Mireille Enos, Joshua Leonard, Stacy Keach, Jamie Blackley, Liana Liberato, Gabrielle Rose, Jakob Davies, Aisha Hinds, Lauren Lee Smith, John Emmet Tracy, Chelah Horsdal, Christine Willes, Aliyah O'Brien, Giles Panton, David Orth, Michael Adamthwaite, Genevieve Buechner, Alisa Weilerstein	
A U G U S T	22	Leprechaun: Origins	Lionsgate	Zach Lipovsky (director); Harris Wilkinson (screenplay); Dylan "Hornswoggle" Postl, Melissa Roxburgh, Garry Chalk, Brendan Fletcher, Stephanie Bennett, Emilie Ullerup, Andrew Dunbar, Teach Grant, Bruce Blain, Mary Black, Adam Boys, Gary Peterman	
A U G U S T	22	Love Is Strange	Sony Pictures	Ira Sachs (director/screenplay); Mauricio Zacharias (screenplay); Alfred Molina, John Lithgow, Darren Burrows, Charlie Tahan, Cheyenne Jackson, Manny Pérez, Marisa Tomei, Harriet Sansom Harris, Christian Coulson, John Cullum, Adriane Lenox, Manny Pérez, Sebastian La Cause, Christina Kirk, Jason Stuart, Jim Newman, Michael J. Burg, Shade Rupe	
A U G U S T	22	The Prince	Lionsgate / Emmett/Furla Oasis Films	Brian A. Miller (director); Andre Fabrizio, Jeremy Passmore (screenplay); Jason Patric, Bruce Willis, John Cusack, Rain, Jessica Lowndes, Johnathon Schaech, Gia Mantegna, Curtis "50 Cent" Jackson, Bonnie Somerville, Andréa Burns, Ho-Sung Pak, Jesse Pruett, Didi Costine, Tim Fields, Courtney B. Turk, Tyler Jon Olson	
A U G U S T	22	Sin City: A Dame to Kill For	Dimension Films / Miramax Films / Troublemaker Studios	Robert Rodriguez (director); Frank Miller (director/screenplay); Mickey Rourke, Jessica Alba, Josh Brolin, Joseph Gordon-Levitt, Rosario Dawson, Bruce Willis, Eva Green, Powers Boothe, Dennis Haysbert, Ray Liotta, Jaime King, Christopher Lloyd, Jamie Chung, Jeremy Piven, Christopher Meloni, Juno Temple, Stacy Keach, Marton Csokas, Jude Ciccolella, Julia Garner, Lady Gaga, Alexa Vega, Patricia Vonne, Bart Fletcher, Alejandro Rose-Garcia, Frank Miller, Robert Rodriguez	
A U G U S T	22	When the Game Stands Tall	TriStar Pictures / Affirm Films / Mandalay Pictures	Thomas Carter (director); Scott Marshall Smith (screenplay); Jim Caviezel, Michael Chiklis, Alexander Ludwig, Laura Dern, Clancy Brown, Gavin Casalegno, Ser'Darius Blain, Stephan James, Matthew Daddario, Jessie Usher, Marlon Favorite, Anna Margaret, J.D. Evermore, Teri Wyble, Christopher Berry, Deric Augustine, Robert DoQui, Billy Slaughter, Joe Massingill, Matthew Frias, LaJessie Smith, Richard Kohnke, Chase Boltin, Adella Gautier	
A U G U S T	29	Ghostbusters (re-release)	Columbia Pictures / Delphi Films / Black Rhino Productions	Ivan Reitman (director); Dan Aykroyd, Harold Ramis (screenplay); Bill Murray, Dan Aykroyd, Sigourney Weaver, Harold Ramis, Rick Moranis, Ernie Hudson, Annie Potts, William Atherton, David Margulies, Michael Ensign, Slavitza Jovan, Paddi Edwards, Ruth Hale Oliver, Alice Drummond, Jennifer Runyon, Steven Tash, Kymberly Herrin, Timothy Carhart, Reginald VelJohnson, Roger Grimsby, Larry King, Joe Franklin, Casey Kasem, Jean Kasem, Ron Jeremy	
A U G U S T	29	As Above, So Below	Universal Pictures / Legendary Pictures	John Erick Dowdle (director/screenplay); Drew Dowdle (screenplay); Perdita Weeks, Ben Feldman, Edwin Hodge, François Civil, Marion Lambert, Ali Marhyar	
S E P T E M B E R	8	Cake	After Dark Films / Echo Films / Cinelou Films	Daniel Barnz (director); Patrick Tobin (screenplay); Jennifer Aniston, Adriana Barraza, Felicity Huffman, William H. Macy, Anna Kendrick, Sam Worthington, Mamie Gummer, Chris Messina, Lucy Punch, Britt Robertson, Paula Cale, Ashley Crow, Manuel Garcia-Rulfo, Camille Guaty, Allen Maldonado, Camille Mana, Julio Oscar Mechoso, Evan O'Toole, Pepe Serna, Misty Upham, Rose Abdoo, Alma Martinez, Craig Castaldo	
S E P T E M B E R	12	Atlas Shrugged: Part III	Atlas Distribution	James Manera (director/screenplay); Harmon Kaslow, John Aglialoro (screenplay); Kristoffer Polaha, Laura Regan, Greg Germann, Eric Allan Kramer, Tony Denison, Mark Moses, Lew Temple, Stephen Tobolowsky, Peter Mackenzie, Larry Cedar, Louis Herthum, Neil Dickson, Rob Morrow, Joaquim de Almeida, Ned Vaughn, Scott Klace, Brent Briscoe, Phil Valentine, Jeff Yagher, Tim de Zarn, Eltony Williams, Lindsey Ginter, Michael Wiseman, Ron Paul, Glenn Beck, Sean Hannity, Matt Kibbe, Andrew Wilkow, Grover Norquist, Rusty Humphries, Jonathan Hoenig, Alexander McCobin, J. Neil Schulman, Pankaj Kumar Jha, Jen Nikolaisen, Dominic Daniel	
S E P T E M B E R	12	Dolphin Tale 2	Warner Bros. Pictures / Alcon Entertainment	Charles Martin Smith (director/screenplay); Harry Connick Jr., Ashley Judd, Nathan Gamble, Kris Kristofferson, Cozi Zuehlsdorff, Morgan Freeman, Austin Stowell, Juliana Harkavy, Austin Highsmith, Charles Martin Smith, Denis Arndt, Carlos Gomez, Bethany Hamilton, Kim Ostrenko, Tom Hillmann, Jim R. Coleman, Denisea Wilson, Julia Jordan, Betsy Landin, Lee Karlinsky, Taylor Blackwell, Tom Nowicki	
S E P T E M B E R	12	Honeymoon	Magnolia Pictures	Leigh Janiak (director/screenplay); Phil Graziadei (screenplay); Rose Leslie, Harry Treadaway	
S E P T E M B E R	12	No Good Deed	Screen Gems / Will Packer Productions	Sam Miller (director); Aimée Lagos (screenplay); Idris Elba, Taraji P. Henson, Leslie Bibb, Kate del Castillo, Henry Simmons, Mark Ferrol Smith, Wilbur Fitzgerald, Mirage Spann	
S E P T E M B E R	17	The Guest	Picturehouse	Adam Wingard (director); Simon Barrett (screenplay); Dan Stevens, Maika Monroe, Leland Orser, Sheila Kelley, Brendan Meyer, Lance Reddick, Chase Williamson, Joel David Moore, Ethan Embry, Jesse Luken, A.J. Bowen, Chris Ellis, Candice K. Patton, Tabatha Shaun, Steve Brown, Brenden Wedner, Alex Knight, Frank Bond, Kelsey Montoya, Justin Yu	
S E P T E M B E R	19	A Walk Among the Tombstones	Universal Pictures / Cross Creek Pictures	Scott Frank (director/screenplay); Liam Neeson, Dan Stevens, David Harbour, Boyd Holbrook, Ólafur Darri Ólafsson, Brian "Astro" Bradley, Mark Consuelos, Adam David Thompson, Sebastian Roché, Laura Birn, Razane Jammal, Danielle Rose Russell, Marielle Heller, Maurice Compte, Eric Nelsen, Stephanie Andujar, Purva Bedi, Novella Nelson, Genevieve Adams, Jeremie Harris, Fabrizio Brienza, Whitney Able, Marina Squerciati, Leon Addison Brown, Frank de Julio	
S E P T E M B E R	19	The Maze Runner	20th Century Fox	Wes Ball (director); Noah Oppenheim, Grant Pierce Myers, T. S. Nowlin (screenplay); Dylan O'Brien, Kaya Scodelario, Thomas Brodie-Sangster, Will Poulter, Patricia Clarkson, Aml Ameen, Ki Hong Lee, Blake Cooper, Dexter Darden, Jacob Latimore, Chris Sheffield, Joe Adler, Don McManus, Randall D. Cunningham, Alexander Flores	
S E P T E M B E R	19	The Scribbler	New Artists Alliance	John Suits (director); Daniel Schaffer (screenplay); Katie Cassidy, Garret Dillahunt, Michelle Trachtenberg, Michael Imperioli, Gina Gershon, Sasha Grey, Kunal Nayyar, Ashlynn Yennie, Eliza Dushku, Billy Campbell, T.V. Carpio, Richard Riehle, Sara Tomko, Michael Berry Jr., Luke Barnett, Sir Hollywood	
S E P T E M B E R	19	The Skeleton Twins	Roadside Attractions	Craig Johnson (director/screenplay); Mark Heyman (screenplay); Bill Hader, Kristen Wiig, Luke Wilson, Ty Burrell, Boyd Holbrook. Joanna Gleason, Kathleen Rose Perkins, Adriane Lenox, Sydney Lucas, Paul Castro Jr., Genevieve Adams, Eddie Schweighardt, Benjamin McGowan	
S E P T E M B E R	19	This Is Where I Leave You	Warner Bros. Pictures	Shawn Levy (director); Jonathan Tropper (screenplay); Jason Bateman, Tina Fey, Adam Driver, Rose Byrne, Corey Stoll, Kathryn Hahn, Connie Britton, Timothy Olyphant, Dax Shepard, Jane Fonda, Debra Monk, Abigail Spencer, Ben Schwartz, Aaron Lazar, Will Swenson, Cheryl Stern, Beth Leavel, Michael Bryan French, Oakes Fegley	
S E P T E M B E R	19	Tusk	A24 Films	Kevin Smith (director/screenplay); Michael Parks, Justin Long, Haley Joel Osment, Genesis Rodriguez, Johnny Depp, Harley Morenstein, Ralph Garman, Jennifer Schwalbach Smith, Harley Quinn Smith, Lily-Rose Depp, Zak Knutson, Scott Mosier, Josh Roush	
S E P T E M B E R	26	The Boxtrolls	Focus Features / Laika	Graham Annable, Anthony Stacchi (directors); Irena Brignull, Adam Pava (screenplay); Ben Kingsley, Isaac Hempstead Wright, Elle Fanning, Dee Bradley Baker, Steve Blum, Toni Collette, Jared Harris, Nick Frost, Richard Ayoade, Tracy Morgan, Simon Pegg, Nika Futterman, Pat Fraley, Fred Tatasciore, Maurice LaMarche, James Urbaniak, Brian George, Laraine Newman, Tom Kenny, Sam Lavagnino, Julian Stone	
S E P T E M B E R	26	The Equalizer	Columbia Pictures / Village Roadshow Pictures / Escape Artists	Antoine Fuqua (director); Richard Wenk (screenplay); Denzel Washington, Marton Csokas, Chloë Grace Moretz, David Harbour, Bill Pullman, Melissa Leo, Haley Bennett, David Meunier, Johnny Skourtis, Alex Veadov, Vladimir Kulich, E. Roger Mitchell, Allen Maldonado, Timothy John Smith, Robert Wahlberg, Johnny Messner, Tait Fletcher, Dan Bilzerian, Elisala Baker, John Tartaglia	
S E P T E M B E R	26	The Song	Samuel Goldwyn Films	Richard Ramsey (director/screenplay); Alan Powell, Ali Faulkner, Caitlin Nicol-Thomas, Danny Vinson, Gary Jenkins, Aaron Benward, Kenda Benward, Jude Ramsey	

== October–December ==
Opening		Title	Production company	Cast and crew	Ref.
O C T O B E R	3	Annabelle	Warner Bros. Pictures / New Line Cinema	John R. Leonetti (director); Gary Dauberman (screenplay); Annabelle Wallis, Ward Horton, Tony Amendola, Alfre Woodard, Kerry O'Malley, Brian Howe, Eric Ladin, Ivar Brogger, Gabriel Bateman, Shiloh Nelson, Tree O'Toole, Robin Pearson Rose, Amy Tipton, Joseph Bishara	
O C T O B E R	3	Gone Girl	20th Century Fox / Regency Enterprises	David Fincher (director); Gillian Flynn (screenplay); Ben Affleck, Rosamund Pike, Neil Patrick Harris, Tyler Perry, Carrie Coon, Kim Dickens, Patrick Fugit, David Clennon, Lisa Banes, Missi Pyle, Emily Ratajkowski, Casey Wilson, Lola Kirke, Boyd Holbrook, Sela Ward, Lee Norris, Jamie McShane, Kathleen Rose Perkins, Lauren Glazier, Scott Takeda, Scoot McNairy	
O C T O B E R	3	The Good Lie	Warner Bros. Pictures / Alcon Entertainment / Imagine Entertainment / Black Label Media	Philippe Falardeau (director); Margaret Nagle (screenplay); Reese Witherspoon, Arnold Oceng, Ger Duany, Emmanuel Jal, Corey Stoll, Kuoth Wiel, Femi Oguns, Sarah Baker, Lindsey Garrett, Afemo Omilami, Mike Pniewski, Thad Luckinbill, Maria Howell, Sope Aluko, Mari Malek	
O C T O B E R	3	Left Behind	Freestyle Releasing	Vic Armstrong (director); Paul LaLonde, John Patus (screenplay); Nicolas Cage, Chad Michael Murray, Cassi Thomson, Nicky Whelan, Jordin Sparks, Lea Thompson, Gary Grubbs, Quinton Aaron, Martin Klebba, Major Dodson, Lance E. Nichols, William Ragsdale, Stephanie Honoré, Lolo Jones, John McConnell, Donny Boaz, Laura Cayouette, Judd Lormand, Georgina Rawlings, Sam Velasquez, Han Soto, Alec Rayme	
O C T O B E R	3	Men, Women & Children	Paramount Pictures	Jason Reitman (director/screenplay); Erin Cressida Wilson (screenplay); Rosemarie DeWitt, Jennifer Garner, Judy Greer, Dean Norris, Adam Sandler, Ansel Elgort, Kaitlyn Dever, J.K. Simmons, David Denman, Jason Douglas, Shane Lynch, Dennis Haysbert, Phil LaMarr, Olivia Crocicchia, Elena Kampouris, Travis Tope, Tina Parker, Will Peltz, Timothée Chalamet, Katherine C. Hughes, Helen Estabrook, Tori Black, Luci Christian, Jaren Lewison, Emma Thompson	
O C T O B E R	6	Last Shift	Magnet Releasing	Anthony DiBlasi (director/screenplay); Scott Poiley (screenplay); Juliana Harkavy, Joshua Mikel, J. LaRose, Mary Lankford, Natalie Victoria, Sarah Sculco	
O C T O B E R	10	Addicted	Lionsgate	Bille Woodruff (director); Christina Welsh, Ernie Barbarash (screenplay); Sharon Leal, Boris Kodjoe, Tasha Smith, Tyson Beckford, Emayatzy Corinealdi, William Levy, Katerina Graham, Maria Howell, Brandon Gonzales, Garrett Hines, Hunter Burke, Cameron Mills, Landon Runion, Lauren Marquez, John Newberg, Paul Hall	
O C T O B E R	10	Alexander and the Terrible, Horrible, No Good, Very Bad Day	Walt Disney Pictures / 21 Laps Entertainment	Miguel Arteta (director); Rob Lieber (screenplay); Steve Carell, Jennifer Garner, Ed Oxenbould, Dylan Minnette, Kerris Dorsey, Bella Thorne, Megan Mullally, Mekai Matthew Curtis, Martha Hackett, Mary Mouser, Alex Désert, Toni Trucks, Liz Carey, Rizwan Manji, Eric Edelstein, Donald Glover, Burn Gorman, Jesse Garcia, Jennifer Coolidge, Jonathan Slavin, Samantha Logan, Thunder From Down Under, Steve Bannos, Michael Blaiklock, Dick Van Dyke, Elise Vargas, Zoey Vargas, Sidney Fullmer, Lincoln Melcher, Reese Hartwig, Joel Johnstone	
O C T O B E R	10	Dracula Untold	Universal Pictures / Legendary Pictures	Gary Shore (director); Matt Sazama, Burk Sharpless (screenplay); Luke Evans, Dominic Cooper, Sarah Gadon, Charles Dance, Art Parkinson, Diarmaid Murtagh, Paul Kaye, William Houston, Noah Huntley, Ronan Vibert, Zach McGowan, Ferdinand Kingsley, Joseph Long, Thor Kristjansson, Jakub Gierszal, Dilan Gwyn, Gary Whelan	
O C T O B E R	10	The Judge	Warner Bros. Pictures / Village Roadshow Pictures / RatPac Entertainment	David Dobkin (director); Nick Schenk, Bill Dubuque (screenplay); Robert Downey Jr., Robert Duvall, Vera Farmiga, Vincent D'Onofrio, Jeremy Strong, Dax Shepard, Billy Bob Thornton, Leighton Meester, Ken Howard, Emma Tremblay, Balthazar Getty, David Krumholtz, Grace Zabriskie, Denis O'Hare, Sarah Lancaster, Matt Riedy, Mark Kiely, Tamara Hickey, Ian Nelson, Johnny Orlando, Daryl Edwards, Lenny Clarke, Timothy John Smith, Enn Reitel	
O C T O B E R	10	Whiplash	Sony Pictures Classics	Damien Chazelle (director/screenplay); Miles Teller, J.K. Simmons, Paul Reiser, Melissa Benoist, Austin Stowell, Nate Lang, Chris Mulkey, Damon Gupton, Max Kasch, Jayson Blair, Kofi Siriboe, Kavita Patil, Michael D. Cohen, April Grace, Marcus Henderson, Henry G. Sanders, Wendee Lee, Michelle Ruff	
O C T O B E R	10	You're Not You	Entertainment One	George C. Wolfe (director); Shana Feste, Jordan Roberts (screenplay); Hilary Swank, Emmy Rossum, Josh Duhamel, Stephanie Beatriz, Jason Ritter, Julian McMahon, Ali Larter, Andrea Savage, Gerald Downey, Mike Doyle, Loretta Devine, Ernie Hudson, Erin Chenoweth, Gareth Williams, Marcia Gay Harden, Frances Fisher, Ed Begley Jr., Geoff Pierson, Beau Knapp, Katharine Lee McEwan	
O C T O B E R	17	Birdman or (The Unexpected Virtue of Ignorance)	Fox Searchlight Pictures / Regency Enterprises	Alejandro G. Iñárritu (director/screenplay); Nicolás Giacobone, Alexander Dinelaris Jr., Armando Bó (screenplay); Michael Keaton, Zach Galifianakis, Edward Norton, Andrea Riseborough, Amy Ryan, Emma Stone, Naomi Watts, Lindsay Duncan, Merritt Wever, Jeremy Shamos, Bill Camp, Damian Young, Michael Siberry, Clark Middleton, Natalie Gold, Paula Pell, David Fierro, Donna Lynne Champlin, Craig muMs Grant, Jackie Hoffman, Susan Blackwell, Stephen Adly Guirgis, Benjamin Kanes, William Youmans, Roberta Colindrez, Shade Rupe	
O C T O B E R	17	The Book of Life	20th Century Fox / Reel FX Animation Studios	Jorge R. Gutierrez (director/screenplay); Doug Langdale (screenplay); Diego Luna, Zoe Saldaña, Channing Tatum, Christina Applegate, Ice Cube, Ron Perlman, Kate del Castillo, Héctor Elizondo, Danny Trejo, Carlos Alazraqui, Ana de la Reguera, Plácido Domingo, Jorge R. Gutierrez, Eugenio Derbez, Gabriel Iglesias, Dan Navarro, Miguel Sandoval, Grey Griffin, Ben Gleib, Cheech Marin, Anjelah Johnson-Reyes, Sandra Equihua, Gunnar Sizemore, Angélica María, Eric Bauza, Aron Warner, Sandra Echeverría, Tonita Castro, Troy Evans, Guillermo del Toro, Brad Booker, Eva Bella, Moosie Drier, Al Rodrigo, Marcelo Tubert, Emil-Bastien Bouffard, Elias Garza, Genesis Ochoa, Trey Bumpass, Kennedy "KK" Peil, Ricardo Sanchez, Ishan Sharma, Callahan Clark, Joe Matthews	
O C T O B E R	17	Camp X-Ray	IFC Films	Peter Sattler (director/screenplay); Kristen Stewart, Peyman Moaadi, Lane Garrison, Joseph Julian Soria, John Carroll Lynch, Julia Duffy, Tara Holt, Ser'Darius Blain, Cory Michael Smith, Yousuf Azami, Marco Khan, Kyle Bornheimer	
O C T O B E R	17	The Czar of Black Hollywood	Block Starz Music Television	Bayer Mack (director/screenplay); Oscar Micheaux	
O C T O B E R	17	Dear White People	Lionsgate / Roadside Attractions	Justin Simien (director/screenplay); Tyler James Williams, Tessa Thompson, Kyle Gallner, Teyonah Parris, Brandon P. Bell, Brittany Curran, Marque Richardson, Malcolm Barrett, Dennis Haysbert, Ashley Blaine Featherson, Nia Jervier, Justin Dobies, Peter Syvertsen, Brandon Alter, Katie Gaulke, Brian James, Keith Myers, Bryan Porter, Terry Hempleman, Naomi Ko, Jemar Michael, Courtney Sauls	
O C T O B E R	17	Fury	Columbia Pictures	David Ayer (director/screenplay); Brad Pitt, Shia LaBeouf, Logan Lerman, Michael Peña, Jon Bernthal, Jason Isaacs, Scott Eastwood, Brad William Henke, Jim Parrack, Xavier Samuel, Kevin Vance, Anamaria Marinca, Alicia von Rittberg, Daniel Betts, John Macmillan, Marek Oravec, Kyle Soller, Jack Bannon, Branko Tomović, Orion Lee, Eugenia Kuzmina, Christopher Maleki	
O C T O B E R	17	Listen Up Philip	Tribeca Films	Alex Ross Perry (director/screenplay); Jason Schwartzman, Elisabeth Moss, Krysten Ritter, Joséphine de La Baume, Jonathan Pryce, Jess Weixler, Dree Hemingway, Kate Lyn Sheil, Daniel London, Lee Wilkof, Steven Boyer, Babs Olusanmokun, Alexandra Neil, Francis Benhamou, Damaris Lewis, Rob Yang, Brandy Burre, Flo Ankah, Marcus Callender, Eric Bogosian, Wai Ching Ho	
O C T O B E R	17	Pernicious	Vintage Media	James Cullen Bressack (director/screenplay); Taryn Hillin (screenplay); Ciara Hanna, Emily O'Brien, Jackie Moore	
O C T O B E R	24	John Wick	Summit Entertainment / Thunder Road Pictures / 87Eleven Productions	Chad Stahelski (director); Derek Kolstad (screenplay); Keanu Reeves, Michael Nyqvist, Alfie Allen, Adrianne Palicki, Bridget Moynahan, Dean Winters, Ian McShane, John Leguizamo, Willem Dafoe, Lance Reddick, Toby Leonard Moore, Daniel Bernhardt, Bridget Regan, Keith Jardine, Tait Fletcher, Thomas Sadoski, Randall Duk Kim, David Patrick Kelly, Clarke Peters, Kevin Nash, Matt McColm, Roman Mitichyan, J.J. Perry, Jimmy Star, Omer Barnea, Munro M. Bonnell	
O C T O B E R	24	Laggies	A24 Films	Lynn Shelton (director); Andrea Seigel (screenplay); Keira Knightley, Chloë Grace Moretz, Sam Rockwell, Kaitlyn Dever, Jeff Garlin, Ellie Kemper, Mark Webber, Daniel Zovatto, Tiya Sircar, Gretchen Mol, Louis Hobson, Dylan Arnold, Jodi Thelen, Jasmin Savoy Brown, Kevin Seal, Rachelle Henry, Sara Coates, Kirsten deLohr Helland, Larissa Schmitz, Sarah Lynn Wright, Phillip Abraham, Rocki DuCharne, Maura Lindsay	
O C T O B E R	24	Revenge of the Green Dragons	A24 Films	Andrew Lau (director); Andrew Loo (director/screenplay); Michael Di Jiacomo (screenplay); Justin Chon, Kevin Wu, Harry Shum Jr., Eugenia Yuan, Geoff Pierson, Ray Liotta, Leonard Wu, Jin Au-Yeung, Ron Yuan, Billy Magnussen, Nahanni Johnstone, Jim Ford, Joanna Adler, Alysia Reiner, Fala Chen, Jon Kit Lee, Shuya Chang, Celia Szeming Au, Alex Fox, Michael Gregory Fung	
O C T O B E R	24	Ouija	Universal Pictures	Stiles White (director/screenplay); Juliet Snowden (screenplay); Olivia Cooke, Daren Kagasoff, Douglas Smith, Bianca Santos, Ana Coto, Shelley Hennig, Lin Shaye, Robyn Lively, Matthew Settle, Sierra Heuermann, Claudia Katz Minnick, Vivis, Afra Sophia Tully, Izzie Galanti, Claire Beale, Sunny May Allison	
O C T O B E R	28	After Midnight	BayView Entertainment	Fred Olen Ray (director/screenplay); Andrew Helm (screenplay); Tawny Kitaen, Catherine Annette, Tim Abell, Jeneta St. Clair, Bobby Rice, Richard Grieco	
O C T O B E R	31	Nightcrawler	Open Road Films	Dan Gilroy (director/screenplay); Jake Gyllenhaal, Rene Russo, Riz Ahmed, Bill Paxton, Kevin Rahm, Michael Hyatt, Ann Cusack, Michael Papajohn, James Huang, Eric Lange, Kiff VandenHeuvel, Myra Turley, Jamie McShane, Marco Rodriguez, Jonny Coyne, Dig Wayne, Kent Shocknek, Pat Harvey, Sharon Tay, Bill Seward, Carolyn Gilroy, Leah Fredkin, Rick Garcia	
N O V E M B E R	5	Interstellar	Paramount Pictures / Warner Bros. Pictures / Legendary Pictures / Syncopy	Christopher Nolan (director/screenplay); Jonathan Nolan (screenplay); Matthew McConaughey, Anne Hathaway, Jessica Chastain, Bill Irwin, Ellen Burstyn, Michael Caine, John Lithgow, Casey Affleck, Wes Bentley, Topher Grace, David Gyasi, Matt Damon, Josh Stewart, Leah Cairns, David Oyelowo, Collette Wolfe, Francis X. McCarthy, William Devane, Elyes Gabel, Jeff Hephner, Brooke Smith, Mackenzie Foy, Timothée Chalamet, Liam Dickinson, Lennart Nowak	
N O V E M B E R	7	A Merry Friggin' Christmas	Phase 4 Films	Tristram Shapeero (director); Michael Brown (screenplay); Joel McHale, Lauren Graham, Clark Duke, Oliver Platt, Wendi McLendon-Covey, Tim Heidecker, Candice Bergen, Robin Williams, Pierce Gagnon, Bebe Wood, Ryan Lee, Amara Miller, Mark Proksch, Jeffrey Tambor, Amir Arison, Steele Gagnon, Gene Jones, Matt Jones, William Sanderson	
N O V E M B E R	7	The Better Angels	Amplify	A. J. Edwards (director/screenplay); Jason Clarke, Diane Kruger, Brit Marling, Wes Bentley, Veanne Cox, Braydon Denney, Cameron Mitchell Williams	
N O V E M B E R	7	Big Hero 6	Walt Disney Pictures / Walt Disney Animation Studios	Chris Williams (director); Jordan Roberts, Robert L. Baird, Dan Gerson (screenplay); Scott Adsit, Ryan Potter, Daniel Henney, T.J. Miller, Jamie Chung, Damon Wayans Jr., Genesis Rodriguez, James Cromwell, Maya Rudolph, Alan Tudyk, Katie Lowes, Daniel Gerson, Paul Briggs, David Shaughnessy, Billy Bush, Stan Lee, Abraham Benrubi, Kirk Baily, Cam Clarke, Nicholas Guest, Bridget Hoffman, Leah Latham, Yuri Lowenthal, Tim Mertens, Sundra Oakley, Shane Sweet, Josie Trinidad	
N O V E M B E R	7	Elsa & Fred	Millennium Entertainment	Michael Radford (director/screenplay); Anna Pavignano (screenplay); Shirley MacLaine, Christopher Plummer, Marcia Gay Harden, Wendell Pierce, Jared Gilman, Chris Noth, Scott Bakula, Erika Alexander, Reg Rogers, George Segal, James Brolin, Osvaldo Rios, Jamie Camil, Lance Nichols, Lisa Sheridan, John McConnell, Dave Davis, Carsten H.W. Lorenz, Donny Boaz, Anita Ekberg, Marcello Mastroianni, Barack Obama, Deanna Meske, McCartney Bisgard	
N O V E M B E R	7	Jessabelle	Lionsgate / Blumhouse Productions	Kevin Greutert (director); Robert Ben Garant (screenplay); Sarah Snook, Mark Webber, David Andrews, Joelle Carter, Ana de la Reguera, Amber Stevens, Chris Ellis, Brian Hallisay, Vaughn Wilson, Larisa Oleynik, Fran Bennett, Lucius Baston, Karen Strassman	
N O V E M B E R	14	Beside Still Waters	Tribeca Films	Chris Lowell (director/screenplay); Mohit Narang (screenplay); Ryan Eggold, Beck Bennett, Will Brill, Brett Dalton, Erin Darke, Jessy Hodges, Britt Lower, Reid Scott	
N O V E M B E R	14	Beyond the Lights	Relativity Media	Gina Prince-Bythewood (director/screenplay); Gugu Mbatha-Raw, Nate Parker, Minnie Driver, Colson "MGK" Baker, Danny Glover, Darryl Stephens, Elaine Tan, Isaac Keys, Tyler Christopher, Benito Martinez, Aisha Hinds, Estelle, Brandon Wilson, Jordan Belfi, Hayley Marie Norman, Rob Locke, Laurieann Gibson, Aml Ameen, Wren T. Brown, Rocsi Diaz, Tom Wright, Chaka Khan, Amar'e Stoudemire, Don Lemon, Gayle King, DeAndre Jordan, Ashley Hamilton, Rob Raco, Julian Stone, Jesse Woodrow, Jasmine Vargas, India Jean-Jacques	
N O V E M B E R	14	Dumb and Dumber To	Universal Pictures	Peter Farrelly, Bobby Farrelly (directors/screenplay); Sean Anders, John Morris, Bennett Yellin, Mike Cerrone (screenplay); Jim Carrey, Jeff Daniels, Rob Riggle, Laurie Holden, Rachel Melvin, Kathleen Turner, Steve Tom, Don Lake, Patricia French, Bill Murray, Tembi Locke, Paul Blackthorne, Brady Bluhm, Eddie Shin, Matty Cardarople, Michael Yama, Grant James, Derek Holland, Kasseem "Swizz Beatz" Dean, Mike Cerrone, Jo Helton, Edward Barbanell, Jon Barinholtz, Dalton E. Gray, Mama June Shannon, Carly Craig, Sandra Dorsey, Daniel Greene, Danny Murphy, Ricky Blitt, Jeremy Garelick, Julius Sharpe, Deepak Sethi, Danny Smith, John Viener, Wellesley Wild, Lex Lang, Cam Neely	
N O V E M B E R	14	Foxcatcher	Sony Pictures	Bennett Miller (director); E. Max Frye, Dan Futterman (screenplay); Steve Carell, Channing Tatum, Mark Ruffalo, Vanessa Redgrave, Sienna Miller, Anthony Michael Hall, Guy Boyd, Brett Rice, David Zabriskie, Mark Schultz, Stan Dziedzic, Bruce Baumgartner, Alan Oppenheimer, Jesse Jantzen, Brock Lesnar, Samara Lee, Jackson Frazer, Jane Mowder, Daniel Hilt, Lee Perkins, David "Doc" Bennett, Jazz Securo	
N O V E M B E R	14	The Homesman	Roadside Attractions	Tommy Lee Jones (director/screenplay); Kieran Fitzgerald, Wesley Oliver (screenplay); Tommy Lee Jones, Hilary Swank, Meryl Streep, Grace Gummer, Miranda Otto, Sonja Richter, John Lithgow, James Spader, Hailee Steinfeld, Caroline Lagerfelt, Tim Blake Nelson, Jesse Plemons, William Fichtner, David Dencik, Barry Corbin, Evan Jones, Jo Harvey Allen, Karen Jones	
N O V E M B E R	14	Saving Christmas	Samuel Goldwyn Films	Darren Doane (director/screenplay); Cheston Hervey (screenplay); Kirk Cameron, Darren Doane, Bridgette Ridenour, David Shannon, Raphi Henley, Ben Kientz	
N O V E M B E R	21	The Hunger Games: Mockingjay – Part 1	Lionsgate	Francis Lawrence (director); Danny Strong, Peter Craig (screenplay); Jennifer Lawrence, Josh Hutcherson, Liam Hemsworth, Woody Harrelson, Elizabeth Banks, Julianne Moore, Philip Seymour Hoffman, Jeffrey Wright, Stanley Tucci, Donald Sutherland, Willow Shields, Paula Malcomson, Sam Claflin, Jena Malone, Stef Dawson, Mahershala Ali, Natalie Dormer, Evan Ross, Wes Chatham, Elden Henson, Patina Miller, Robert Knepper, Sarita Choudhury, Nicholas Pryor, Donna Biscoe, Michael Garza, Jordan Woods-Robinson	
N O V E M B E R	26	Horrible Bosses 2	Warner Bros. Pictures / New Line Cinema / RatPac Entertainment	Sean Anders (director/screenplay); John Morris (screenplay); Jason Bateman, Charlie Day, Jason Sudeikis, Jennifer Aniston, Jamie Foxx, Chris Pine, Christoph Waltz, Kevin Spacey, Jonathan Banks, Lindsay Sloane, Keegan-Michael Key, Kelly Stables, Jerry Lambert, Sam Richardson, Brianne Howey, Lennon Parham, Suzy Nakamura, Andy Buckley, James Michael Connor, Rob Huebel, Brendan Hunt, Rebecca Field, Keeley Hazell, Ping Wu, Shelby Chesnes, Will Forte, Brandon Richardson, Bruno Amato	
N O V E M B E R	26	Penguins of Madagascar	20th Century Fox / DreamWorks Animation / PDI/DreamWorks	Eric Darnell, Simon J. Smith (director); Michael Colton, John Aboud and Brandon Sawyer (screenplay); Tom McGrath, Chris Miller, Christopher Knights, Conrad Vernon, Benedict Cumberbatch, Ken Jeong, Annet Mahendru, Peter Stormare, John Malkovich, Andy Richter, Danny Jacobs, Werner Herzog, Stephen Kearin, Chris Sanders, Mike Mitchell, Walt Dohrn, Jim Pirri, Jeff Fischer, Al Rodrigo, Ava Acres, Nicholas Guest, Billy Eichner	
D E C E M B E R	5	Comet	IFC Films	Sam Esmail (director/screenplay); Emmy Rossum, Justin Long, Kayla Servi, Eric Winter, Geoffrey Gould	
D E C E M B E R	5	Wild	20th Century Fox	Jean-Marc Vallée (director); Nick Hornby (screenplay); Reese Witherspoon, Laura Dern, Thomas Sadoski, Michiel Huisman, Gaby Hoffmann, Kevin Rankin, W. Earl Brown, Mo McRae, Brian Van Holt, Cliff DeYoung, Nick Eversman, Charles Baker, J.D. Evermore, Beth Hall, Jan Hoag, Art Alexakis, Cheryl Strayed, Ted Rooney, Bobbi Strayed Lindstrom, Keene McRae, Ray Mist, Randy Schulman, Cathryn de Prume, Anne Gee Byrd, Evan O'Toole, Jason Newell	
D E C E M B E R	12	Exodus: Gods and Kings	20th Century Fox / Chernin Entertainment / Scott Free Productions	Ridley Scott (director); Adam Cooper, Bill Collage, Jeffrey Caine, Steven Zaillian (screenplay); Christian Bale, Joel Edgerton, John Turturro, Aaron Paul, Ben Mendelsohn, Sigourney Weaver, Ben Kingsley, María Valverde, Isaac Andrews, Hiam Abbass, Indira Varma, Ewen Bremner, Golshifteh Farahani, Ghassan Massoud, Tara Fitzgerald, Dar Salim, Andrew Tarbet, Ken Bones, Philip Arditti, Emun Elliott, Anton Alexander, Kevork Malikyan, Giannina Facio, Abhin Galeya	
D E C E M B E R	12	Inherent Vice	Warner Bros. Pictures	Paul Thomas Anderson (director/screenplay); Joaquin Phoenix, Josh Brolin, Owen Wilson, Katherine Waterston, Reese Witherspoon, Benicio del Toro, Jena Malone, Maya Rudolph, Martin Short, Joanna Newsom, Hong Chau, Jeannie Berlin, Michael Kenneth Williams, Michelle Sinclair, Elaine Tan, Sasha Pieterse, Martin Donovan, Eric Roberts, Jillian Bell, Serena Scott Thomas, Jefferson Mays, Keith Jardine, Peter McRobbie, Sam Jaeger, Timothy Simons, Christopher Allen Nelson, Wilson Bethel, Anders Holm, Amy Ferguson, Emma Dumont, Catherine Haena Kim, Madison Leisle, The Growlers, Jack Kelly, Richard Nixon, Chantal Thuy, Jordan Christian Hearn, Yvette Yates, Andrew Simpson, Samantha Lemole, Matt Doyle, Liam Van Joosten	
D E C E M B E R	12	The Color of Time	Starz Digital	Edna Luise Biesold, Sarah-Violet Bliss, Gabrielle Demeestere, Alexis Gambis, Shruti Ganguly, Brooke Goldfinch, Shripriya Mahesh, Pamela Romanowsky, Bruce Thierry Cheung, Tine Thomasen, Virginia Urreiztieta, Omar Zúñiga Hidalgo (director/screenplay); Zach Braff, Bruce Campbell, Jessica Chastain, James Franco, Henry Hopper, Mila Kunis	
D E C E M B E R	12	Top Five	Paramount Pictures	Chris Rock (director/screenplay); Chris Rock, Rosario Dawson, Gabrielle Union, Cedric the Entertainer, J.B. Smoove, Tracy Morgan, Kevin Hart, Anders Holm, Jay Pharoah, Michael Che, Sherri Shepherd, Leslie Jones, Romany Malco, Hayley Marie Norman, Karlie Redd, Rachel Feinstein, Dan Naturman, Rick Shapiro, Greer Barnes, Annaleigh Ashford, Matthew Wilkas, Ben Vereen, Brian Regan, Hassan Johnson, Doug Stanhope, Tichina Arnold, Luis Guzmán, Julie Halston, Miriam Colón, Olga Merediz, Kevin Barnett, Genevieve Angelson, Capathia Jenkins, Vivian Nixon, Deidre Goodwin, Greta Lee, Sherrod Small, Aaron Clifton Moten, Stacey Sargeant, Precious Lee, Erica Watson, Tom Papa, Allan Havey, Angela Lewis, Whoopi Goldberg, Jerry Seinfeld, Adam Sandler, Anthony Cumia, Taraji P. Henson, Gabourey Sidibe, DMX, Charlie Rose, Bruce Bruce, Larry Flick, Jim Norton, Sam Roberts, Gregg Hughes, Sway, Dean Edwards, Lynne Koplitz, Deborah Offner, Brian Michael Smith, Rich Vos	
D E C E M B E R	17	The Hobbit: The Battle of the Five Armies	Warner Bros. Pictures / New Line Cinema / Metro-Goldwyn-Mayer	Peter Jackson (director/screenplay); Fran Walsh, Philippa Boyens, Guillermo del Toro (screenplay); Martin Freeman, Ian McKellen, Richard Armitage, Evangeline Lilly, Lee Pace, Luke Evans, Benedict Cumberbatch, Ken Stott, James Nesbitt, Cate Blanchett, Ian Holm, Christopher Lee, Hugo Weaving, Orlando Bloom, Graham McTavish, Aidan Turner, Dean O'Gorman, Manu Bennett, Mark Hadlow, Jed Brophy, Adam Brown, John Callen, Peter Hambleton, William Kircher, Stephen Hunter, Sylvester McCoy, John Tui, Billy Connolly, Mikael Persbrandt, Stephen Fry, Ryan Gage, Mark Mitchinson, John Bell, Sarah Peirse, Conan Stevens, Miranda Harcourt, Thomasin McKenzie, Dee Bradley Baker, Otep Shamaya, Debra Wilson, Ruby Ashbourne Serkis, Billy Boyd, Peter Jackson, Dominic Monaghan, Hilary Norris, Terry Notary, Shane Rangi, Chris Reilly, Eric Saindon, Marco Sinigaglia, Jacob Tomuri	
D E C E M B E R	17	Goodbye To All That	IFC Films	Angus MacLachlan (director/screenplay); Paul Schneider, Anna Camp, Michael Chernus, Heather Graham, Ashley Hinshaw, Heather Lawless, Melanie Lynskey, Audrey P. Scott, Amy Sedaris, Celia Weston	
D E C E M B E R	19	Annie	Columbia Pictures / Village Roadshow Pictures / Overbrook Entertainment	Will Gluck (director/screenplay); Aline Brosh McKenna (screenplay); Jamie Foxx, Quvenzhané Wallis, Rose Byrne, Bobby Cannavale, Cameron Diaz, Adewale Akinnuoye-Agbaje, David Zayas, Zoe Margaret Colletti, Nicolette Pierini, Dorian Missick, Tracie Thoms, Mike Birbiglia, Stephanie Kurtzuba, Michael J. Fox, Jill Nicolini, Andrew Fleming, Patricia Clarkson, Sia, Derrick Baskin, Bobby Moynihan, Mila Kunis, Ashton Kutcher, Rihanna, Pat Kiernan, Gabriella Baldacchino, Cynthia Basinet, Tate McRae, Eden Duncan-Smith, Amanda Troya, Peter Van Wagner, Taylor Richardson, Scarlett Benchley, Rachel Crowther	
D E C E M B E R	19	Night at the Museum: Secret of the Tomb	20th Century Fox / 21 Laps Entertainment / 1492 Pictures	Shawn Levy (director); David Guion, Michael Handelman (screenplay); Ben Stiller, Robin Williams, Owen Wilson, Dan Stevens, Ben Kingsley, Steve Coogan, Ricky Gervais, Rebel Wilson, Skyler Gisondo, Rami Malek, Patrick Gallagher, Mizuo Peck, Crystal the Monkey, Dick Van Dyke, Mickey Rooney, Bill Cobbs, Andrea Martin, Rachael Harris, Matt Frewer, Brad Garrett, Percy Hynes White, Brennan Elliott, Anjali Jay, Patrick Sabongui, Louriza Tronco, Theo Devaney, Alice Eve, Hugh Jackman	
D E C E M B E R	25	American Sniper	Warner Bros. Pictures / Village Roadshow Pictures / RatPac Entertainment	Clint Eastwood (director); Jason Dean Hall (screenplay); Bradley Cooper, Sienna Miller, Max Charles, Luke Grimes, Jake McDorman, Cory Hardrict, Keir O'Donnell, Marnette Patterson, Ben Reed, Eric Close, Kyle Gallner, Kevin Lacz, Eric Ladin, Sammy Sheik, Leonard Roberts, Tim Griffin, Brian Hallisay, Erik Audé, Navid Negahban, Mido Hamada, Sam Jaeger, Chance Kelly, Fahim Fazli, Jonathan Groff, Melissa Hayden, Owain Yeoman, Madeleine McGraw, Jet Jurgensmeyer, Jason Hall, Billy Miller, Brando Eaton, Fehd Benchemsi, Assaf Cohen, Robert Clotworthy, Anthony Jennings, Brad Abrell, Clint Eastwood	
D E C E M B E R	25	Big Eyes	The Weinstein Company	Tim Burton (director); Scott Alexander, Larry Karaszewski (screenplay); Amy Adams, Christoph Waltz, Danny Huston, Jon Polito, Krysten Ritter, Jason Schwartzman, Terence Stamp, Delaney Raye, Madeleine Arthur, James Saito, Elisabetta Fantone, Gabe Khouth, Dylan Kingwell, Peter Kelamis, Vincent Gale, Fred Keating, Heather Doerksen, Leela Savasta, Stephanie Bennett, Tony Alcantar, Andrew Airlie, Michael Kopsa, Barclay Hope, Eric Keenleyside, Greg Kean, Britt Irvin	
D E C E M B E R	25	The Gambler	Paramount Pictures	Rupert Wyatt (director); William Monahan (screenplay); Mark Wahlberg, John Goodman, Brie Larson, Michael K. Williams, Jessica Lange, Andre Braugher, Alvin Ing, Domenick Lombardozzi, Emory Cohen, Steve Park, Leland Orser, George Kennedy, Norman Towns, Richard Schiff, Lauren Weedman, Amin Joseph, Da'Vone McDonald, Jessika Van, Shakira Ja'nai Paye, Raquel Pomplun, Simon Rhee, Jacob Bertrand, Sonya Walger, Anthony Kelley, Natalija Ugrina, James Wellington	
D E C E M B E R	25	The Interview	Columbia Pictures	Seth Rogen, Evan Goldberg (directors); Dan Sterling (screenplay); James Franco, Seth Rogen, Lizzy Caplan, Randall Park, Diana Bang, Timothy Simons, Anders Holm, Charles Rahi Chun, Justin Lee, Dan Sterling, Dan Shea, Joe Mande, Alice Wetterlund, Sam Catlin, Guy Fieri, Ben Schwartz, Alan Blumenfeld, David Diaan, Eminem, Joseph Gordon-Levitt, Song Kang-ho, James Kyson, Nicole G. Leier, Rob Lowe, Bill Maher, Seth Meyers, Joe Seo, Emma Stone	
D E C E M B E R	25	Into the Woods	Walt Disney Pictures	Rob Marshall (director); James Lapine (screenplay); Meryl Streep, Emily Blunt, James Corden, Anna Kendrick, Chris Pine, Tracey Ullman, Christine Baranski, Johnny Depp, Lilla Crawford, Daniel Huttlestone, Billy Magnussen, MacKenzie Mauzy, Tammy Blanchard, Lucy Punch, Frances de la Tour, Simon Russell Beale, Richard Glover, Joanna Riding, Annette Crosbie	
D E C E M B E R	25	Selma	Paramount Pictures / Plan B Entertainment	Ava DuVernay (director/screenplay); Paul Webb (screenplay); David Oyelowo, Tom Wilkinson, Tim Roth, Carmen Ejogo, Common, Giovanni Ribisi, Alessandro Nivola, Cuba Gooding Jr., Oprah Winfrey, André Holland, Lorraine Toussaint, Stephan James, Wendell Pierce, LaKeith Stanfield, Dylan Baker, Colman Domingo, Ruben Santiago-Hudson, Stephen Root, Tessa Thompson, Omar Dorsey, Henry G. Sanders, Jeremy Strong, Trai Byers, Corey Reynolds, Niecy Nash, E. Roger Mitchell, Ledisi Young, Kent Faulcon, John Lavelle, Nigél Thatch, Michael Papajohn, Tara Ochs, Martin Sheen, Stan Houston, Michael Shikany	
D E C E M B E R	25	Unbroken	Universal Pictures / Legendary Pictures	Angelina Jolie (director); Joel Coen, Ethan Coen, Richard LaGravenese, William Nicholson (screenplay); Jack O'Connell, Domhnall Gleeson, Miyavi, Garrett Hedlund, Finn Wittrock	

== See also ==
- 2014 in American television
- 2014 in the United States
