= Geoffrey Gould =

American actor

- Born: April 29, 1957 (age 69); Brooklyn, New York
- Occupation: Actor
- Years active: 1996–present
- Website: geoffgould.net

Geoffrey Gould (born April 29, 1957) is an American actor of theater, film and television.

== Career ==
Since starting the professional aspect of his acting career in 1996, Geoffrey Gould began appearing in numerous television projects such as The X-Files, Inherit the Wind (TV film), Sabrina the Teenage Witch, The Suite Life of Zack & Cody, Just for Kicks, Sons & Daughters, Hustle, The Sarah Silverman Program, The Office, Glee, Key and Peele, The Birthday Boys, The League, two episodes of Colony, Check It Out! with Dr. Steve Brule, Modern Family, Crazy Ex-Girlfriend (TV series), Grey's Anatomy, and the first episode of The Crazy Ones. Some of Gould's most visible TV work to date includes but is not limited to as Jim Norris in a second-season episode of Eli Stone, four different episodes of My Name is Earl, an episode of Raising Hope, and a crime-scene forensic photographer in the first episode of Twin Peaks (2017 TV series).

Gould has also worked on numerous motion pictures, including but not limited to In & Out, Dude, Where's My Car?, Pearl Harbor, Big Stan, Blades of Glory, Walk Hard: The Dewey Cox Story, Lower Learning, Yes Man, Barry Munday, Tim Burton's Alice in Wonderland, Bucky Larson: Born to Be a Star, Accepted, Transformers: Dark of the Moon, Ruby Sparks, Jewtopia, Argo, The Trials of Cate McCall, Saving Mr. Banks, Playing It Cool, Comet, and Imagined.

Gould has performed in principal roles in approximately 180 different short films for such student film schools as USC, LA Film School, UCLA, Loyola, and the NY Film Academy, including but not limited to Behind the Curtain, The Immigrants, Santa Croce, Greeters, The Maiden and the Princess, Drowned, Sweet Tooth, His Art, Drink the Gloom, The Color Red, Overeasy, and as the voice of narrator Pastor Deitman in the award-winning animated USC project The Pride of Strathmoor, which won Best Animated Short Jury Award at the 2015 Slamdance Film Festival. Geoffrey Gould's TV principal work includes but is not limited to the Comb-Over Juror in the episode The Chosen on the series The Practice, and re-enacting historical figure Edouard-Rene de Laboulaye for the TV documentary Statue of Liberty: Building of a Colossus,

Gould received second billing in the 2007 feature documentary Strictly Background, which won the Jury Award for Best Documentary at the San Fernando Valley International Film Festival. He played the role of Patrick in the 2013 feature film "Live-In Fear" (retitled as "Consumption" for its direct-to-DVD release, for which Wikipedia disallows citing), and the lead role of Victor Harland in the 2015 comedy fantasy noir thriller independent feature film "Everything," principal photography for which was finally completed in late October 2015. In late 2016 the MPAA officially granted the submitted feature "Everything" with a soft "R" rating.

Since January 2011, Gould has been co-host for the weekly live round-table discussion format online radio talk show The Paranormal View on Para-X radio, each edition of which he writes a synopsis as an independent report page on his official site, each on which he provides links to the guests' sites, books, promotional information, etc., and on which that specific show's archived broadcast is embedded for replay.

In the autumn of 2016, Gould was cast as the "Kindly Old Man" in "The Tension Experience", a 24-room labyrinthal live, horror immersive theater experience directed and co-written by movie writer/director Darren Lynn Bousman. After several weeks of rehearsal, the show ran weekends from Friday September 8, 2016. to Saturday November 12th, 2016, plus a special invitation-only Grand Finale performance the next day, Sunday November 13, 2016. Each sold-out evening contained four (occasionally five) two-hour performances overlapping each other; When the first group were an hour into the experience, the next group would enter and the new performance would begin for them. Due to its high demand, Thursday evening performances were occasionally added. The total number of performance nights was thirty, of which many had four, several having five performances, every single performance of which Gould performed his role that, originally scripted as a one-on-one scene (one in twelve per show actually experienced Gould's Kindly Old Man room), as attendance grew, about a third of the performances, Gould had two participants with which to do a scene designed for one on one, creating a dynamic to come across organically real for two as well as had it been just a single participant.

In October 2017, Gould's short script "Bucky," was one of four winners in the second annual We Make Movies [a.k.a. WMM] script competition. The dark-comedy initially was read on one of WMM's public script table-read nights, again for the script competition's 2017 Semi-Finals night, performed by its cast off-book for the competition's October 25, 2017 Final's night, and a fourth time live, off-book, as an aspect of having been selected as one of the four winning scripts. The same actors from the public readings were cast for the project, Victoria Ippolito as Amy, and Michael Beardsley as Peter. Michael Beardsley also took on the mantle of producer, and post-production editor. The film went into pre-production, under the SAG-AFTRA New Media contract. Principal photography was filmed the night of March 24, 2018. The project's Director of Photography Bruce Birnbaum, created a brief behind-the-scenes video, compiling numerous still photos, as well as some raw-footage clips filmed during its Saturday night production. Entering the film festival circuit, Bucky won Best Comedic Horror Short Award when it premiered for the Golden State Film Festival at the Hollywood TCL Chinese Theater (24 March 2019, Los Angeles), Best Dating Short Award for the Silicon Beach Film Festival (16 June 2019, Los Angeles), Best Dark Comedy Short Award with the Wallachia Film Festival (12 October 2019, Romania), and from Independent Shorts Awards Film Festival, Bucky also won awards for Best Fantasy Short (Honorable Mention, September 8, 2019, Hollywood, California), and Best Dark Comedy Short (26 July 2019, Hollywood, California). It has also been an Official Selection for the We Make Movies International Film Festival, a.k.a. WMM Fest (13 July 2019, Los Angeles), the Great Lakes International Film Festival (19 September 2019, Erie, Pennsylvania), the HEX After Dark Film Festival (11 October 2019, Calgary, Alberta, Canada), and Mesa International Film Festival (17 October 2019, Mesa, Arizona).
