= Jimmy Star =

American Actor and Radio and Television Host

Jimmy Star is an American radio/television host, actor, writer, clothing designer, and publicist.

== Early life ==
He was born in Miami, Florida.

== Career ==
=== The Jimmy Star Show with Ron Russell ===
Star is the host of The Jimmy Star Show with Ron Russell, which he shares with his husband Ron Russell. Ron is an actor, host, the producer, and Golden Age Hollywood expert.

As part of the show, Russell interviewed celebrities such as Tony Curtis, Tippi Hedren, Tab Hunter, Dean Cain and Pink.

=== Publicist and public relations expert ===
Star is president of World Star PR.

=== Author ===
Star is an author. He wrote Charlie Chaplin: Silent Icon and wrote a chapter entitled "Secrets of Social Media Success" in The Change 16: Insights Into Self-empowerment.

=== Actor ===
Star appeared in several Marvel Cinematic Universe films. He appeared in 2010 in The Incubus, and in 2011 in Son of Morning.

=== Clothing designer ===
Since 1998, Star has been a celebrity clothing and fashion designer.

== Personal life ==
Star is married to actor, host, writer, and producer Ron Russell.
