= Sope Aluko =

Nigerian-born British-American actress

- Born: July 5, 1975 (age 50); Nigeria
- Occupation: Actress
- Years active: 2009-present

Sope Aluko (/ˈʃoʊpwɛ əˈluːkoʊ/ SHOHP-weh ə-LOO-koh; born July 5, 1975) is a Nigerian-born British-American actress.

== Life and career ==
Aluko was born in Nigeria. She was raised in the United Kingdom, as her father was in the diplomatic service, which resulted in her traveling many places. Ultimately, she began attending boarding school at ten and studied in the U.K. where she grew up and earned her master's degree in Marketing. Sope had previously tried theater, but her parents did not approve of it. She traveled to America while she was on holiday and ran into her future husband "by accident". She stayed and worked in Corporate America for fifteen years. After her parents died, she decided to pursue acting again. On her background, Sope said, "When I started off in this industry...they would say, “I love your accent but…” I just didn't trust myself enough. I started going to classes to try to get rid of my accent. One day, I just said, NO because this is me. If that doesn't work then maybe I'm just not cut out for this. The minute I did that, things just changed."like it was magic

Since then, Sope has made numerous appearances on television since then including Bloodline, Law & Order: Special Victims Unit, Parks and Recreation, Burn Notice, Graceland and Army Wives. She has also acted in feature films including Identity Thief and Pitch Perfect 2.

In early 2018, Sope began gaining attention for nabbing a role in the Marvel Studios film Black Panther as a Shaman. Her casting was met with praise in her home town in Nigeria. On being in the movie Sope stated, "I had to make sure I was fit for the role because one of my scenes that was going to involve some physical activity...And then for my role, I had to speak in a different accent. I made sure I did my research about the accent...I wanted to make sure I was prepared prior to coming on set." She expressed that being in the movie was a dream come true and hoped that she could expand her acting to Nollywood. Sope later appeared in Venom, her character was given the name Dr. Rosie Collins.

In 2022, Sope was cast in the lead for a new Hulu series titled Bammas.

== Personal life ==
Sope Aluko is married and has two sons. She is a practicing Christian.

Due to her role in Black Panther, Miami-Dade County, Florida Mayor Carlos A. Giménez has labeled April 10 as "Sope Aluko Day".

== Filmography ==
Film roles
Year	Title	Role	Notes
2009	Up in the Air	Software Woman	Uncredited
2009	Reckoning	Jennifer Carson	Short film
2009	Corporate Karma	Penny	Short film
2010	Realm	Alyssa's Teacher	Short film
2011	96 Minutes	Prison Worker	
2011	Overruled: Government Invasion of Your Parental Rights	Spokeswoman	Short film
2012	Message in a Bottle	Angela	Short film
2013	Identity Thief	Secretary at Prominence Denver	
2014	Sabotage	Receptionist	Uncredited
2014	Untold	Records Clerk	
2014	The Good Lie	Processing Office Woman	
2015	Pitch Perfect 2	French Commentator	
2015	American Ultra	Krueger's Wife	Uncredited
2015	Joy	Fimi	Short film
2016	13 Hours: The Secret Soldiers of Benghazi	BBC News Anchor	Uncredited
2016	Remember When	Maggie	Short film
2017	All Summers End	Mrs. Morris	
2018	Black Panther	Sope the Shaman	
2018	Venom	Dr. Rosie Collins	
2019	The Best of Enemies	Henrietta Kaye	
2022	Black Panther: Wakanda Forever	Sope the Shaman	

Television roles
Year	Title	Role	Notes
2012	America's Most Wanted: America Fights Back	Sherly Pierre	Episode: "Emmana Michel"
2012	Burn Notice	Dr. Winnick	Episode: "Last Rites"
2012	Army Wives	Laura Oakley	Episode: "The War at Home"
2013	The Glades	Zombie Nurse	Episode: "Apocalypse Now"
2013	Parks and Recreation	Lisa	2 episodes
2013	The Arrangement	Mariana	TV movie
2013	Law & Order: Special Victims Unit	Reporter #2	Episode: "American Tragedy"
2013-2014	Ravenswood	Doctor	2 episodes
2015	Zoo	Host	Episode: "Eats, Shoots and Leaves"
2015	Graceland	Agent Avery Stanwood	4 episodes
2015	How to Get Away with Murder	Detective Shelby Diaz	Episode: "She's Dying"
2015	Satisfaction	Detective Lacy	Episode: "...Through Travel"
2015	The Mindy Project	Nadine	Episode: "Mindy and Nanny"
2017	The Inspectors	Professor Madeline Magoro	Episode: "Trial by Error"
2017	Shots Fired	Judge Margeaux Matthews	Episode: "Hour Six: The Fire This Time"
2017	Bloodline	Shana Wilson	2 episodes
2018	Counterpart	Nurse Jacqueline	Episode: "No Man's Land - Part Two"
2021	Legacies	Ayomi	3 episodes
2023	Captain Fall	Additional voices	Episode: "Je Suis Tanner"
