= Mike Houston (actor) =

American actor

Mike Houston is an American actor known for his roles in Boardwalk Empire, Flesh and Bone, Orange Is the New Black, and She Said where he plays the voice of Harvey Weinstein.

== Filmography ==
=== Film ===
Year	Title	Role	Notes
2007	Black Irish	Police Officer	Uncredited
2009	The Taking of Pelham 123	Money Car Driver	
2010	Rocksteady	Boss Man	
2011	I'm Not Me	Mark Lawton	
2013	A Song Still Inside	Chip	
2013	The Happy House	Skip	
2013	Inside Llewyn Davis	Train Station Cop	
2013	Blood Ties	Policeman #2	
2014	Jack Ryan: Shadow Recruit	CIA Agent	
2014	Deliver Us from Evil	Nadler	
2014	The Drop	Donny	
2015	True Story	Visiting Room Guard	
2015	Bridge of Spies	Man in Courtroom	
2016	The Drowning	Louis	
2018	All Square	Petey	
2022	She Said	Harvey Weinstein	
2025	Bury Me When I'm Dead	Buck Campbell	

=== Television ===
Year	Title	Role	Notes
2006	Rescue Me	EMT	Episode: "Devil"
2006–2008	Brotherhood	Eddie Parry	3 episodes
2007–2009	As the World Turns	Officer Grady / Marshal Brewster	4 episodes
2008	Canterbury's Law	Officer Joseph Callahan	Episode: "What Goes Around"
2008	Law & Order: Criminal Intent	FBI Agent 2	Episode: "Last Rites"
2009	Gossip Girl	Polo Event Security Guard	Episode: "Reversals of Fortune"
2009	The Good Wife	Policeman	Episode: "Stripped"
2009	Mercy	Officer Grant	Episode: "You Lost Me with the Cinderblock"
2009	White Collar	Customs Official	Episode: "Pilot"
2009	Can Openers	Orthopedic Surgery Resident	Television film
2010	Law & Order	Officer Fred Colson	Episode: "Four Cops Shot"
2010	The Big C	Cop	Episode: "Playing the Cancer Card"
2011	Onion News Network	Train Conductor	Episode: "The Trial of TR-425"
2011	Unforgettable	Erik Newsome	2 episodes
2011	Weekends at Bellevue	Southerland	Television film
2011, 2012	Person of Interest	Officer Fordes	2 episodes
2011–2013	Blue Bloods	Various roles	8 episodes
2012–2013	Boardwalk Empire	Ralph	5 episodes
2013–2016	Inside Amy Schumer	Various roles	10 episodes
2014	The Leftovers	Porter (Casino Manager)	Episode: "Two Boats and a Helicopter"
2014	Stuck on A	DJ Rick Lewd	Episode: "Stupid Muffin"
2015	Forever	Ken	Episode: "The Last Death of Henry Morgan"
2015	Flesh and Bone	Teddy	5 episodes
2015	Jessica Jones	Harvey	Episode: "AKA You're a Winner!"
2015–2017	Sneaky Pete	Dennis	7 episodes
2016–2019	Orange Is the New Black	CO Lee Dixon	40 episodes
2019	Elementary	Marty Bledsoe	Episode: "Gutshot"
2019	NCIS: New Orleans	Samuel Barnes	Episode: "Overlooked"
2019	Chicago Med	Russell Collins	Episode: "I Can't Imagine the Future"
2021	FBI: Most Wanted	Sheriff Lancaster	Episode: "Obstruction"
2021–2022	The Blacklist	Detective Marcus Heber	3 episodes
Never aired	Gotham	Lead Detective	Television film

=== Video games ===
Year	Title	Role
2013	Grand Theft Auto V	The Local Population
2018	Red Dead Redemption 2	Hamish
