= Steve Terada =

American martial artist (born 1984)

- Born: Steve Terada; 1984 (age 41–42); United States
- Height: 5 ft 5 in (1.65 m)
- Weight: 137 lb (62 kg; 9.8 st)
- Style: Tang Soo Do

Other information
- Spouse: Stacie Rathbone

Steve Terada (born February 15, 1984) is an American martial artist, performer, choreographer, and stunt artist best known for his contributions to martial arts tricking and for blending martial arts with dance and acrobatics in stage and screen performances. He is also recognized as a founding member of the 2016 Emmy award winning dance team Quest Crew.

== Early life ==
Steve Terada was born in the United States and began training in martial arts at a young age. He studied Tang Soo Do, earning a black belt, and later expanded his training to include disciplines such as Taekwondo and Wushu. His early exposure to multiple styles influenced his interest in performance‑based martial arts rather than traditional competitive fighting.

== Career ==
Terada is widely known within the extreme martial arts and tricking communities. Martial arts tricking is a performance‑oriented discipline that combines kicks, spins, flips, and acrobatic movements derived from martial arts and gymnastics. During his competitive years, Terada won multiple titles in extreme forms and tricking divisions at international martial arts tournaments. He is credited with helping popularize tricking during its early growth in the late 1990s and early 2000s. Several signature movements and combinations are commonly associated with his style, and he is often cited as an influence by later generations of trickers. In addition to martial arts, Terada became deeply involved in dance and choreography. He is a founding member of Quest Crew, a dance group that gained mainstream recognition after winning America's Best Dance Crew. Within the group, Terada contributed a distinctive fusion of martial arts, acrobatics, and hip‑hop movement. His performance background led to appearances in high‑profile music videos, live shows, and touring productions, where martial arts elements were integrated into choreographed dance routines.

Terada has worked as a stunt performer, actor, and movement specialist in film and television. His credits include roles in action choreography, stunt coordination, and on‑screen appearances. His background in tricking and martial arts has made him a sought‑after performer for action‑oriented and stylized productions. Steve Terada is considered one of the early figures who helped bring martial arts tricking from niche tournaments to global visibility through dance competitions, music videos, and film. His work contributed to the acceptance of tricking as both a martial art expression and a performance discipline.

== Personal life ==
Terada is in a relationship with Stacie Rathbone, who is a stunt artist.

== Filmography ==
- Beverly Hills Ninja (1997) – Terada has a small role as a martial artist character in this comedy starring Chris Farley.
- Memoirs of a Geisha (2005) – Terada has a brief on-screen part in this dramatic adaptation set in pre- and post-World War II Japan.
- Alvin and the Chipmunks: The Squeakquel (2009) – Terada appears (credited as a dancer/performer) in this family comedy sequel.
- Honey 2 (2011)
- Battle of the Year (2013) – Terada plays Sight in this dance competition film centered on breakdancing and hip-hop culture.
- When the Bough Breaks (2016)
- The Art of Self-Defense (2019) – Terada plays Thomas, one of the karate students in this dark comedy about a beginner who joins a dojo.
