= Rachel Williams =

Rachel Williams may refer to:

- Rachel DeLoache Williams (born 1988), American photographer
- Rachel Rodriguez-Williams (born 1978), American politician
- Rachel Williams (model) (born 1967), American model and landscape designer
- Rachel Williams (footballer) (born 1988), English footballer
- Rachel Williams (hockey umpire), English field hockey umpire
- Rachel Williams (police officer), English police officer
- Rachel L. Williams, British biomaterials engineer
