= Diane Passage =

American woman from New York City (born 1976)

- Born: 1976 (age 49–50); Detroit
- Other name: Chase
- Occupation: exotic dancer
- Known for: married a wealthy Wall Street funds manager

Diane Passage is an American woman from New York City who has been described as a "socialite". Her former husband met her when she worked as an exotic dancer at Scores, one of the New York City strip clubs profiled in the movie Hustlers.

Passage was born in Detroit, and moved to New York when she was 17 years old. Exotic dancing was just one of her jobs. At the time she met her second husband Kenneth I. Starr, a Wall Street hedge fund manager, her day job was at an ad agency. Passage quit dancing after marrying Starr, in 2007, and three years later Starr's investors learned he had been running a ponzi scheme.

When her judge pronounced her husband's guilty verdict she proclaimed that “He seemed to have lost his moral compass, partly as a result of infatuation with his young fourth wife.”

After she separated from Starr, Passage was cast in a reality TV show that would have been called Wall Street Wives. The series did not end up being produced.

After her husband's arrest she says she befriended her neighbor, Catherine Hopper, the fiancée of the son of another ponzi schemer, Bernie Madoff.

In 2011 Passage started writing a dating advice column that Gawker mocked for its cynicism.

Passage is a proponent of pole dancing. She has organized charity events focussed around pole dancing and worked to get it recognized as a sport, even suggesting it had a place at the Olympic Games.

== See also ==
- Samantha Barbash
- Roselyn Keo
