= Ben Wallace =

Ben Wallace most commonly refers to:

- Ben Wallace (basketball) (born 1974), American basketball player
- Ben Wallace (politician) (born 1970), British former Secretary of State for Defence

Ben Wallace may also refer to:

- Benjamin Wallace (circus owner) (1847–1921), American circus owner
- Bennie Wallace (born 1946), American jazz tenor saxophonist
- Benjamin Wallace (writer) (born 1968/1969), American author and magazine writer
- Ben Wallace (footballer) (born 2004), New Zealand footballer
