= Kenneth I. Starr =

American accountant and former money manager convicted of running a Ponzi scheme

- Born: 1943/1944; South Bronx, New York, US
- Other name: Ken Starr
- Education: Queens College, City University of New York
- Occupations: Money manager, lawyer
- Children: 4

Kenneth Ira Starr (born 1943/1944) is an American accountant and former money manager convicted of running a $35 million Ponzi scheme with the money of numerous wealthy and celebrity clients. Starr was given a seven and a half year sentence in 2011.

== Early life and education ==
Starr was the youngest of three sons born to a public-school principal in the South Bronx. He entered Queens College at the age of fifteen. He is Jewish.

== Early career and financial problems ==
Starr began his career as an accountant at a Manhattan-based firm before transitioning to private practice. Following a period at an investment firm co-founded with his brother, attorney Warren Starr, he established an independent investment company, Starr & Company, LLC (Starrco). Starr gained wealthy and well-known clients, business associates and friends including Blackstone founder Pete Peterson, restaurateur Shelly 'Shelly's' Fireman, and a Who's-Who of many Hollywood stars including Al Pacino, Natalie Portman, Martin Scorsese, Carly Simon, Wesley Snipes, Sylvester Stallone, and Uma Thurman. He has been likened to a 'mini-Madoff' for the kind of clients he attracted, the breach of trust, and his notoriety.

Starr's financial and legal problems began to surface in the late-1990s after he was sued by Sylvester Stallone in connection with the Planet Hollywood restaurant chain and Starr's alleged role in Stallone's $10 million loss. As his financial world began to crumble, Starr's then-wife, Marisa Vucci Starr, resigned as Starrco's office manager. This left only Starr's son, Ron Starr (identified though not a subject of the indictment as RonStar Bristol), also an attorney and then co-Chief Compliance Officer, as the only family member left at the company. At the time of Starr's arrest, Ron Starr, along with the company's other co-Chief Compliance Officer, were—with the assistance of outside counsel—conducting an internal investigation into Starr's conduct, and had already forced Starr to surrender signatory authority over all client accounts. Ron Starr then proceeded to assist the authorities in his father's prosecution and continues to work as a financial adviser in Manhattan.

In 2015, Starr sued fifty of his former clients, claiming they had not paid him for the genuine services he had performed for them, prior to his arrest.

== Indictment, arrest, conviction, and sentencing ==
In May 2010, Starr was indicted and arrested on 23 criminal counts, including various fraud charges and money laundering. When authorities went to arrest him, they found him hiding in a closet at the very upscale Manhattan apartment he purchased and lavishly furnished from stolen funds.

At a bail hearing in July 2010, Starr's bail was set at $10 million, but none among his wealthy family and friends, alone or in collaboration, would agree to post bond.

In September 2010, Starr pleaded guilty in federal court. He was sentenced by United States District Court judge Shira Scheindlin in March 2011 to a 7.5-year prison term. Scheindlin opted for leniency, arguing essentially that victims of the disgraced celebrity accountant, such as Uma Thurman, Lauren Bacall, Neil Simon and Denise Rich, were rich and did not go broke as a result of his fraud scheme. At sentencing, Scheindlin specifically named Diane Passage as an immoral influence on Starr.

The investigation of Starr led to the arrest of longtime Democratic politician, New York City Council member and former Manhattan Borough President Andrew Stein for lying to federal investigators about his involvement with Starr's multimillion-dollar Ponzi scheme. Stein was later sentenced to 500 hours of community service for misdemeanor tax evasion.

== Personal life ==
Starr has been married four times. He and first wife, Gail Starr, have two estranged children: son, Ron Starr (who aided in the prosecution of his father), and daughter, Terri Starr.

After divorcing his first wife, he married Sheila Starr, who was his then-current office manager. Sheila in turn hired Marisa Vucci, to replace herself as office manager.

In 1991, after divorcing Sheila, Starr married his third wife, Marisa Vucci Starr, Starrco's then-current office manager. He and Marisa have two daughters: Samantha Starr, and Alexa Starr. While still married to Marisa, who was by then suffering from advanced multiple sclerosis, Starr met Diane Passage, a single mother and dancer at the Scores strip club. In 2007, Starr and Marisa divorced.

In 2007, Starr married his fourth wife, Passage, who had stopped working as a stripper after they met. Starr was eager to satisfy her financially. Starr was imprisoned in the fall of 2010. Passage filed for divorce in July 2011, claiming she could not wait for him to complete his prison sentence in 2016. Starr and Passage were divorced on March 20, 2013.
