= Julia Garner =

American actress (born 1994)

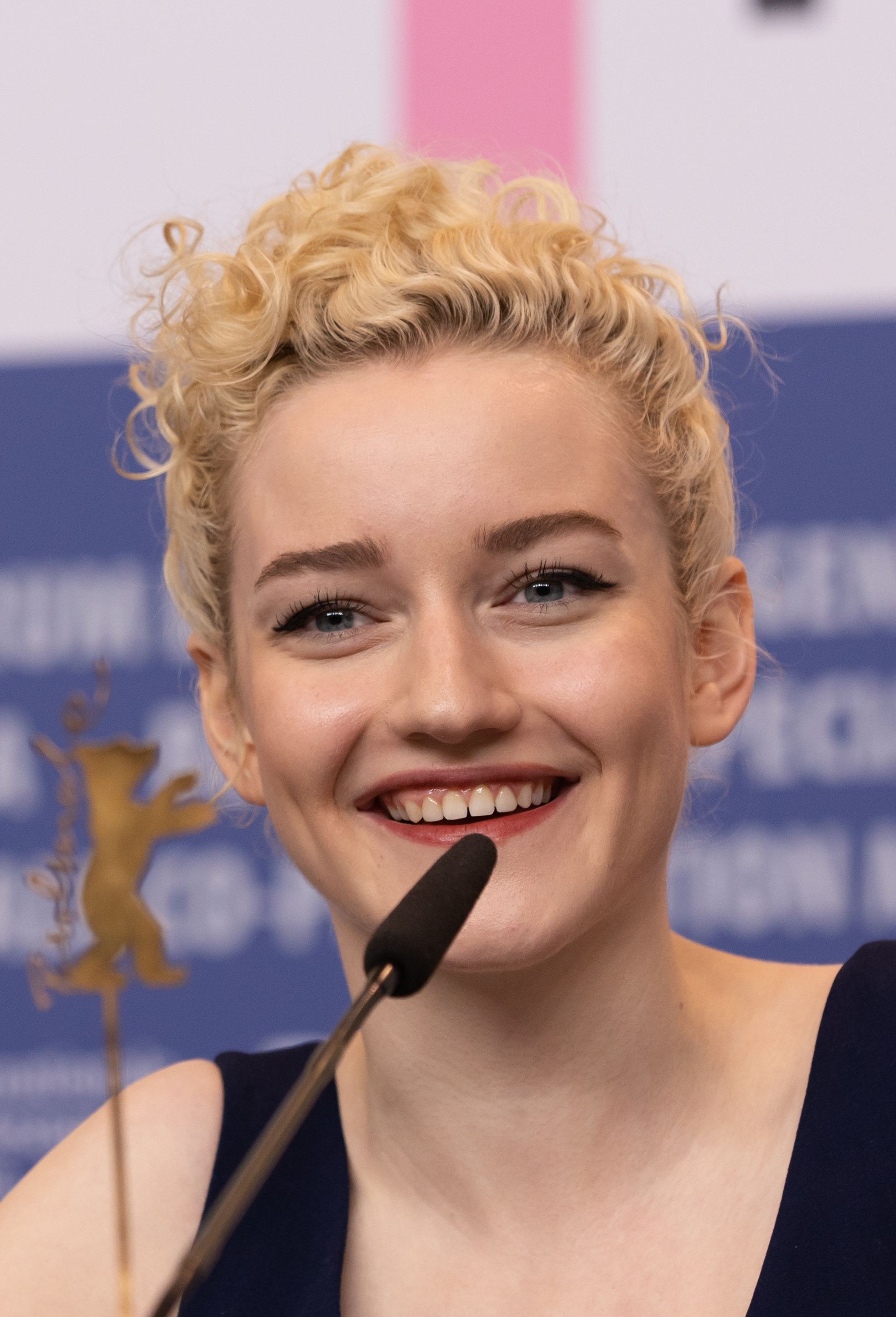
- Garner in 2020
- Born: February 1, 1994 (age 32); New York City, U.S.
- Occupation: Actress
- Years active: 2011–present
- Spouse: Mark Foster (m. 2019; sep. 2026)

Julia Garner (born February 1, 1994) is an American actress. She gained recognition for playing Ruth Langmore in the Netflix crime drama series Ozark (2017–2022), for which she received critical acclaim and won three Primetime Emmy Awards for Outstanding Supporting Actress in a Drama Series and a Golden Globe Award for Best Supporting Actress.

Garner also had roles in the FX drama series The Americans (2015–2018), the Netflix miniseries Maniac (2018), and the Bravo true crime series Dirty John (2018–2019). In 2022, she portrayed Anna Sorokin in the Netflix miniseries Inventing Anna, for which she received nominations for a Primetime Emmy Award and a Golden Globe Award for Best Actress.

In film, Garner has appeared in Martha Marcy May Marlene (2011), The Perks of Being a Wallflower (2012), Sin City: A Dame to Kill For (2014), and The Fantastic Four: First Steps (2025). She also had lead roles in the films Grandma (2015), The Assistant (2019), The Royal Hotel (2023), Wolf Man (2025), and Weapons (2025).

== Early life and education ==
Julia Garner was born on February 1, 1994, in the Riverdale neighborhood of the Bronx, New York. Her mother, Tamar Gingold, is a therapist who worked as an actress and comedian in Israel. Her father, Thomas Garner, is a painter and an art teacher originally from Shaker Heights, Ohio. Although her father is not Jewish, Garner identifies as Jewish, as her mother is. Her older sister is artist Anna Garner. She understands Hebrew because her mother speaks it, but is not fluent herself.

Garner attended Eagle Hill School in Greenwich, Connecticut. She began taking acting lessons at age 15 to overcome her shyness. During the 2023 SAG-AFTRA strike, Garner studied clown under Philippe Gaulier at École Philippe Gaulier in France.

== Career ==
=== 2011–2018: Early roles and breakthrough ===
Garner made her film debut at age 17 in Sean Durkin's Martha Marcy May Marlene, playing the role of Sarah.

In 2012, director David Chase invited her to play a small role he had written specifically for her in his film Not Fade Away. Also in the same year, she landed her first leading role in the film Electrick Children. In 2013, she starred alongside Ashley Bell in the horror film The Last Exorcism Part II, and played the lead in the American remake of the Mexican horror film We Are What We Are.

Garner co-starred in Sin City: A Dame to Kill For (2014) as new character Marcie, a young stripper who crosses paths with another new character, Johnny (Joseph Gordon-Levitt). This marked the first time she acted against a green screen.

In 2015, Garner starred in the Paul Weitz-directed comedy film Grandma alongside Lily Tomlin. Garner played a teenaged student eliciting the help of her lesbian poet grandmother (Tomlin) for an abortion. In 2016, she appeared in an episode of Lena Dunham's HBO comedy series Girls titled "The Panic in Central Park".

Garner continued acting in television and was cast in a recurring role in the third season of the FX period spy-thriller series The Americans. She continued the role through season six. She was to have made her off-Broadway debut in Noah Haidle's play Smokefall at MCC Theater in 2016, but had to drop out during rehearsals because of scheduling conflicts.

Beginning in 2017, Garner starred as Ruth Langmore in the Netflix crime drama series Ozark, opposite Jason Bateman and Laura Linney. The role gained her critical acclaim and three Primetime Emmy Awards for Outstanding Supporting Actress in a Drama Series.

In 2018, Garner appeared in the Paramount Network miniseries Waco as Michelle, the sister of Melissa Benoist's character; and in the Netflix miniseries Maniac as Ellie, the sister of Emma Stone's character. Garner also made regular appearances in the Bravo true crime anthology series Dirty John (2018–19). She starred as Terra Newell, the daughter of Connie Britton's character.

=== 2019–present: Crime films and horror roles ===
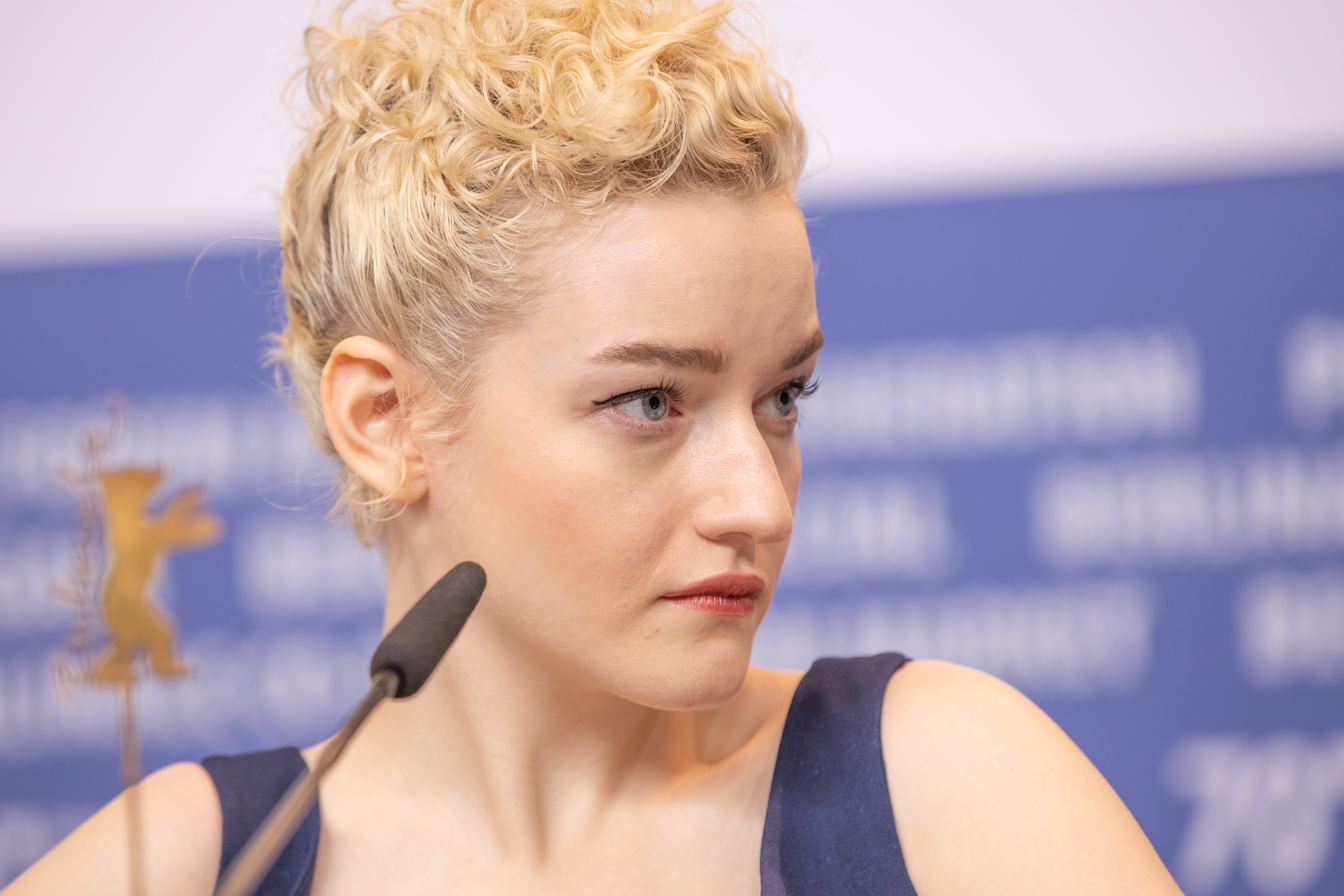
Garner at the 70th Berlin International Film Festival in 2020

In 2019, Garner appeared in the Amazon anthology series, Modern Love. She was featured in two episodes of its first season as a woman who has a crush on a much older man, played by Shea Whigham. In the same year, she starred in the independent drama film The Assistant as a production assistant in a toxic work environment. The film which was directed by Kitty Green, addressed the current culture surrounding the MeToo movement. The film premiered at the 2019 Telluride Film Festival to critical acclaim. Garner received acclaim for her performance as well as an Independent Spirit Award nomination.

Garner also co-stars in the Netflix miniseries Inventing Anna, playing the title role of fraudster Anna Delvey. The series was created and produced by Shonda Rhimes, based on the New York article "How Anna Delvey Tricked New York's Party People" written by Jessica Pressler. It was released on Netflix on February 11, 2022.

In 2022, Garner was cast in thriller film Apartment 7A which serves as a prequel to 1968's Rosemary's Baby, directed by Natalie Erika James. Her company Alma Margo also signed a first look deal with Tomorrow Studios. In June of the same year, Garner was chosen by Madonna to play her in her self-produced biopic Who's That Girl; the project was put on hold while the singer was touring, and work on it had reportedly restarted in 2024.

In 2023, she starred in The Royal Hotel directed by Kitty Green.

In April 2024, Garner was cast as Shalla-Bal / Silver Surfer in the Marvel Cinematic Universe film The Fantastic Four: First Steps. That same year, she was cast in Leigh Whannell's Wolf Man, along with Zach Cregger's horror film Weapons. All three films premiered in 2025.

== Personal life ==
Garner married singer Mark Foster, lead vocalist of Foster the People, in a December 2019 ceremony at New York City Hall, eight months after they got engaged. In July 2026, it was announced they had separated.

Following the October 7 attacks in 2023, Garner signed an open letter published by Creative Community for Peace praising President Joe Biden for "unshakable moral conviction, leadership, and support for the Jewish people", as well as calling for the release of all hostages kidnapped during the attacks.

== Filmography ==
Key
†	Denotes films that have not yet been released

=== Film ===
Year	Title	Role	Notes
2011	Martha Marcy May Marlene	Sarah	
2012	Electrick Children	Rachel McKnight	
2012	The Perks of Being a Wallflower	Susan	
2012	Not Fade Away	Girl in Car	
2013	We Are What We Are	Rose Parker	
2013	The Last Exorcism Part II	Gwen	
2013	Hair Brained	Shauna Holder	
2014	I Believe in Unicorns	Cassidy	
2014	Sin City: A Dame to Kill For	Marcie	
2015	Grandma	Sage	
2016	Good Kids	Tinsley	
2017	Tomato Red	Jamalee Merridew	
2017	One Percent More Humid	Catherine	
2017	Everything Beautiful Is Far Away	Rola	
2019	The Assistant	Jane	
2023	The Royal Hotel	Hanna	
2024	Apartment 7A	Terry Gionoffrio	
2025	Wolf Man	Charlotte Lovell	
2025	The Fantastic Four: First Steps	Shalla-Bal / Silver Surfer	
2025	Weapons	Justine Gandy	
2026	You Can't Win	Chicken	Filmed in 2012
2026	Confessions II	Herself	Short film
TBA	Tyrant †	TBA	Post-production

=== Television ===
Year	Title	Role	Notes
2015–2018	The Americans	Kimberly Breland	Recurring role; 10 episodes
2016	Girls	Charlie's Roommate	Episode: "The Panic in Central Park"
2016–2017	The Get Down	Claudia Gunns	2 episodes
2017–2022	Ozark	Ruth Langmore	Main role
2018	Waco	Michelle Jones	Miniseries
2018	Maniac	Ellie Landsberg	Miniseries
2018–2019	Dirty John	Terra Newell	Main role (season 1)
2019	Modern Love	Maddy	2 episodes
2020	Robot Chicken	Various voices	Voice; episode: "Callie Greenhouse in: Fun. Sad. Epic. Tragic"
2022	Inventing Anna	Anna (Sorokin) Delvey	Miniseries
2023	RuPaul's Drag Race	Herself	Guest judge; episode: "The Crystal Ball: Episode 200"
2023	RuPaul's Drag Race: Untucked	Herself	Episode: "Untucked - The Crystal Ball: Episode 200"
2026	The Altruists †	Caroline Ellison	Miniseries, also executive producer
TBA	Guilty Creatures †	TBA	Miniseries, also executive producer

=== Music videos ===
Year	Title	Artist(s)	Ref.
2026	"Bring Your Love"	Madonna and Sabrina Carpenter	

== Awards and nominations ==
Award	Year	Category	Nominated work	Result	Ref.
Astra Film Awards	2026	Best Actress - Drama	Weapons	Nominated	
Astra TV Awards	2022	Best Supporting Actress in a Streaming Series, Drama	Ozark	Nominated	
Boston Society of Film Critics	2020	Best Actress	The Assistant	Runner-up	
Critics' Choice Super Awards	2026	Best Actress in a Superhero Movie	The Fantastic Four: First Steps	Nominated	
Critics' Choice Television Awards	2018	Best Supporting Actress in a Movie/Miniseries	Dirty John	Nominated	
Critics' Choice Television Awards	2018	Best Supporting Actress in a Drama Series	Ozark	Nominated	
Critics' Choice Television Awards	2020	Best Supporting Actress in a Drama Series	Ozark	Nominated	
Critics' Choice Television Awards	2022	Best Supporting Actress in a Drama Series	Ozark	Nominated	
Critics' Choice Television Awards	2022	Best Actress in a Movie/Miniseries	Inventing Anna	Nominated	
Golden Globe Awards	2020	Best Supporting Actress – Television	Ozark	Nominated	
Golden Globe Awards	2022	Best Supporting Actress – Television	Ozark	Won	
Golden Globe Awards	2022	Best Actress – Miniseries or Television Film	Inventing Anna	Nominated	
Gotham Awards	2011	Best Ensemble Cast (Note: Shared with: Elizabeth Olsen, Christopher Abbott, Brady Corbet, Hugh Dancy, Maria Dizzia, John Hawkes, and Sarah Paulson)	Martha Marcy May Marlene	Nominated	
Independent Spirit Awards	2020	Best Female Lead	The Assistant	Nominated	
Nickelodeon Kids' Choice Awards	2026	Favorite Villain	The Fantastic Four: First Steps	Nominated	
Primetime Emmy Awards	2019	Outstanding Supporting Actress in a Drama Series	Ozark (episode: "The Gold Coast!")	Won	
Primetime Emmy Awards	2020	Outstanding Supporting Actress in a Drama Series	Ozark (episode: "In Case of Emergency")	Won	
Primetime Emmy Awards	2022	Outstanding Supporting Actress in a Drama Series	Ozark (episode: "Sanctified")	Won	
Primetime Emmy Awards	2022	Outstanding Lead Actress in a Limited or Anthology Series or Movie	Inventing Anna	Nominated	
Saturn Awards	2026	Best Actress in a Film	Weapons	Nominated	
Screen Actors Guild Awards	2018	Outstanding Ensemble in a Drama Series	Ozark (season 2)	Nominated	
Screen Actors Guild Awards	2018	Outstanding Female Actor in a Drama Series	Ozark (season 2)	Nominated	
Screen Actors Guild Awards	2020	Outstanding Ensemble in a Drama Series	Ozark (season 3)	Nominated	
Screen Actors Guild Awards	2020	Outstanding Female Actor in a Drama Series	Ozark (season 3)	Nominated	
Screen Actors Guild Awards	2022	Outstanding Ensemble in a Drama Series	Ozark (season 4)	Nominated	
Screen Actors Guild Awards	2022	Outstanding Female Actor in a Drama Series	Ozark (season 4)	Nominated	
Screen Actors Guild Awards	2022	Outstanding Female Actor in a Miniseries Series or Television Movie	Inventing Anna	Nominated	
