= Samantha Barbash =

American entrepreneur

- Other names: Samantha Foxx, Samantha Sbarro
- Occupations: bar hostess, author, occupational spa owner
- Known for: incidents from her life were dramatized into the movie Hustlers
- Website: www.staybeautifulaesthetics.com

Samantha Barbash is an American entrepreneur and former adult entertainment host whose real-life story with Roselyn Keo formed the basis for the film Hustlers, starring Jennifer Lopez and Constance Wu. The film was adapted from Jessica Pressler's 2015 New York magazine article, "The Hustlers at Scores". Barbash later published her own memoir, Underscore.

== Early life and career ==
Known professionally as Samantha Foxx, she began working in adult entertainment at age 19. She later became a hostess at Scores Gentlemen's Club in the Chelsea neighborhood of Manhattan and at Hustlers Club in the same borough. Many of the clubs’ highest-spending clients were Wall Street brokers.

== Legal issues and later work ==
Barbash was placed on probation for five years after pleading guilty to conspiracy, assault, and grand larceny. Following her conviction, she opened a medispa offering cosmetic and aesthetic procedures under the name Stay Beautiful Aesthetics.

=== Lawsuit against film producers ===
In 2020, Barbash filed a lawsuit against Jennifer Lopez’s production company, Nuyorican Productions, and STX Entertainment, claiming that the film Hustlers used her likeness without authorization. The case was dismissed in 2021 after a federal judge ruled that the movie was a work of fiction.

== Arrest and conviction ==
On June 9, 2014, Barbash was arrested along with Roselyn Keo, Karina Pascucci and Marsi Rosen following an eight-month investigation by the Drug Enforcement Administration's Tactical Diversion Squad and the New York City Police Department. The indictment, brought by the Office of the Special Narcotics Prosecutor, charged the defendants with offenses including grand larceny, conspiracy, assault, forgery and tampering with physical evidence. Prosecutors alleged that victims were drugged and then charged large sums on their credit cards at New York City clubs. Barbash and Keo were described by prosecutors as overseeing the financial side of the scheme. The defendants were presumed innocent until proven guilty at the time of the arrests.

Barbash pleaded guilty to conspiracy, assault and grand larceny. In April 2017 she was sentenced to five years of probation and avoided jail time. Pascucci and Rosen were each sentenced to jail time served on weekends in addition to probation while Keo received five years of probation.

== Lawsuit over Hustlers ==
On January 7, 2020, Barbash filed suit in the United States District Court for the Southern District of New York against STX Financing (dba STX Entertainment), Gloria Sanchez Productions, Nuyorican Productions and Pole Sisters LLC, the producers and distributors of Hustlers. She sought $40 million, alleging that the film exploited her likeness in violation of the New York Civil Rights Law and defamed her. Her defamation claim centered on the film's suggestion that her character devised the drug mixture used in the scheme.

== See also ==
- Diane Passage
