= Anna Delvey =

Russian-born German larcenist (born 1991)

- Delvey in 2026
- Born: Anna Vadimovna Sorokina; January 23, 1991 (age 35); Domodedovo, Russian SFSR, Soviet Union
- Other names: Anna Sorokin; Anna Sorokina; Anna Sorokin-Delvey
- Citizenship: Russia; Germany
- Status: NYSDOC #19G0366; Released from New York State custody in February 2021; currently under house arrest in the United States
- Conviction: April 25, 2019; 7 years ago
- Criminal charges: Grand larceny, second-degree larceny, theft of services
- Penalty: 4 to 12 years imprisonment, $24,000 fine, $199,000 restitution

Anna Vadimovna Sorokin (Russian: Анна Вадимовна Сорокина, romanized: Anna Vadimovna Sorokina, pronounced [ˈanːə sɐˈrokʲɪnɐ]; born January 23, 1991), also known as Anna Delvey, is a Russian-German former socialite who gained notoriety for posing as a wealthy German heiress. After the fraud was exposed, she was convicted in New York of grand larceny, attempted grand larceny, and related offenses.

Born near Moscow, Delvey emigrated from Russia to Germany with her family as a teenager. In 2011, at the age of 20, Delvey left Germany to live in London and Paris. In 2013, Delvey relocated to New York City, where she interned for the French fashion magazine Purple. She conceived of a private members' club and arts foundation, which included leasing a large building to feature pop-up shops and exhibitions by notable artists she met while interning. She later created fake financial documents to substantiate her claims of having a multi-million-euro trust fund and forged multiple wire transfer confirmations. She used these documents, as well as fraudulent checks, to trick banks, acquaintances, and realtors into paying out cash and granting large loans without collateral. She used this to fund her lavish lifestyle, including residencies in multiple upscale hotels.

Between 2013 and 2017, Delvey defrauded and deceived major financial institutions, banks, hotels, and individuals. In 2017, the NYPD arrested Delvey in a sting operation with the help of her former friend, Rachel DeLoache Williams, who accused Delvey of defrauding her of US$62,000. In 2019, a New York state court convicted Delvey of attempted grand larceny, larceny in the second degree, and theft of services, and she was sentenced to 4 to 12 years in prison. After serving two years, she was released on parole. Six weeks later, she was taken into the custody of U.S. Immigration and Customs Enforcement for deportation to Germany. In October 2022, after 19 months of detention, Delvey was granted a $10,000 bail bond and released to house arrest.

Delvey's story gained publicity when Williams wrote a lengthy article in Vanity Fair about her experiences with Delvey in 2018. She expanded on the story in her book My Friend Anna (2019). The same year, journalist Jessica Pressler wrote an article for New York about Delvey's life as a socialite; Netflix paid Delvey $320,000 for the rights to her story and developed it into the miniseries Inventing Anna (2022). Delvey's life story has been the subject of multiple other television shows, interviews, podcasts, and theater productions.

== Early life ==
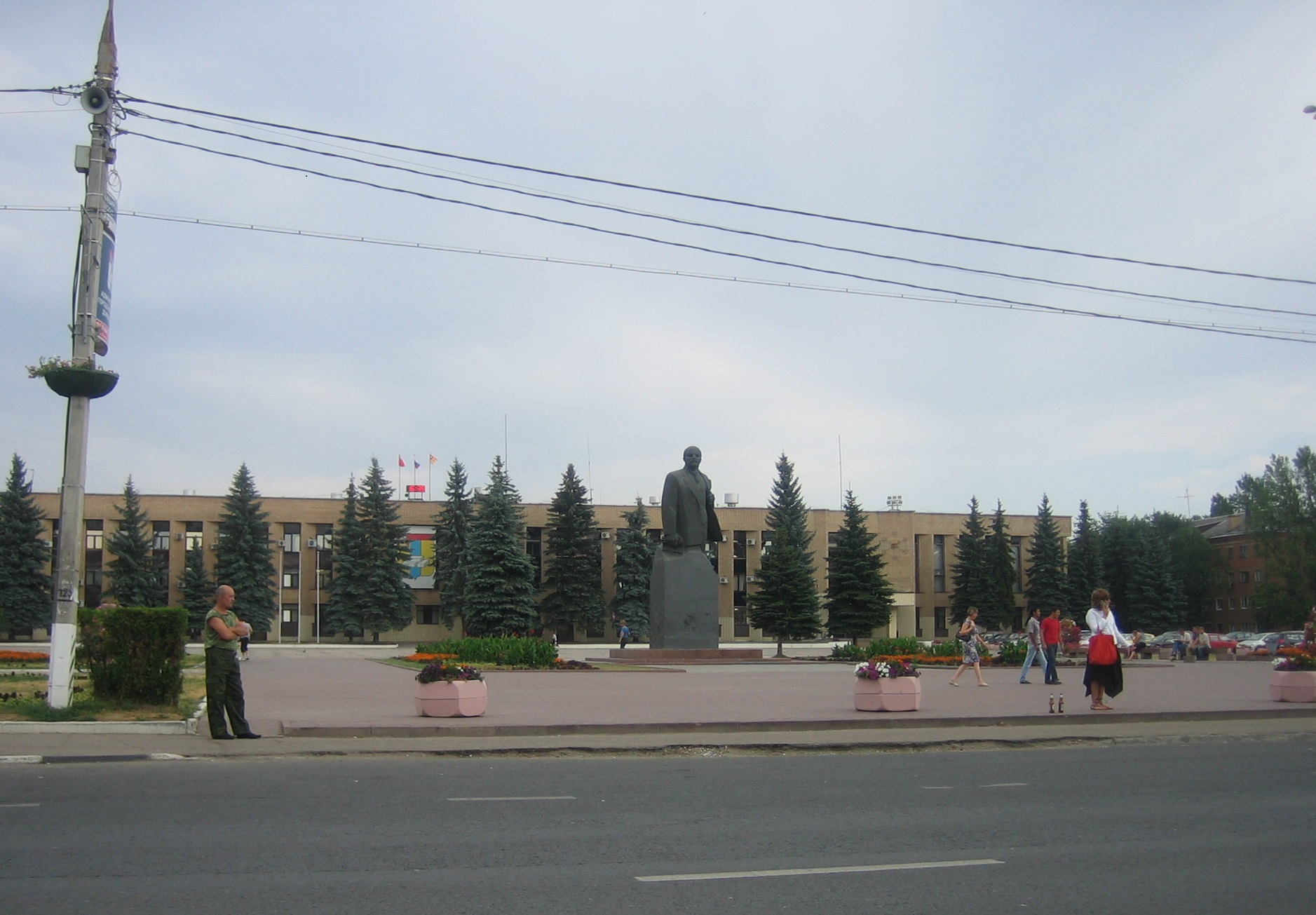
Her birthplace Domodedovo, a satellite town south of Moscow

Delvey was born on January 23, 1991, in Domodedovo, a working-class satellite town south of Moscow, Russian Soviet Federative Socialist Republic, in the Soviet Union. Her father, Vadim, worked as a truck driver. When Delvey was a teenager, her family relocated to North Rhine-Westphalia, Germany. There, her father became an executive at a transport company until the company became insolvent in 2013. He then opened an HVAC business specializing in efficient energy use. Delvey attended the Bischöfliche Liebfrauenschule Eschweiler (Episcopal School of Our Lady of Eschweiler), a Catholic grammar school in Eschweiler. Peers said she was quiet and struggled with the German language. As a young adult, Delvey obsessively followed Vogue, fashion blogs, and image accounts on LiveJournal and Flickr.

After graduating from the school in June 2011, Delvey moved to London to attend Central Saint Martins, an art school, but soon dropped out and returned to Germany. In 2012, she briefly interned at a public relations company in Berlin. Delvey then relocated to Paris, where she earned around €400 per month at an internship for Purple, a French fashion magazine. Delvey did not contact her parents often, but they subsidized her rent. Around that time, she adopted the "Delvey" surname, which she said was based on her mother's maiden name. Delvey's parents, however, said they do not recognize the surname.

== Fraud ==
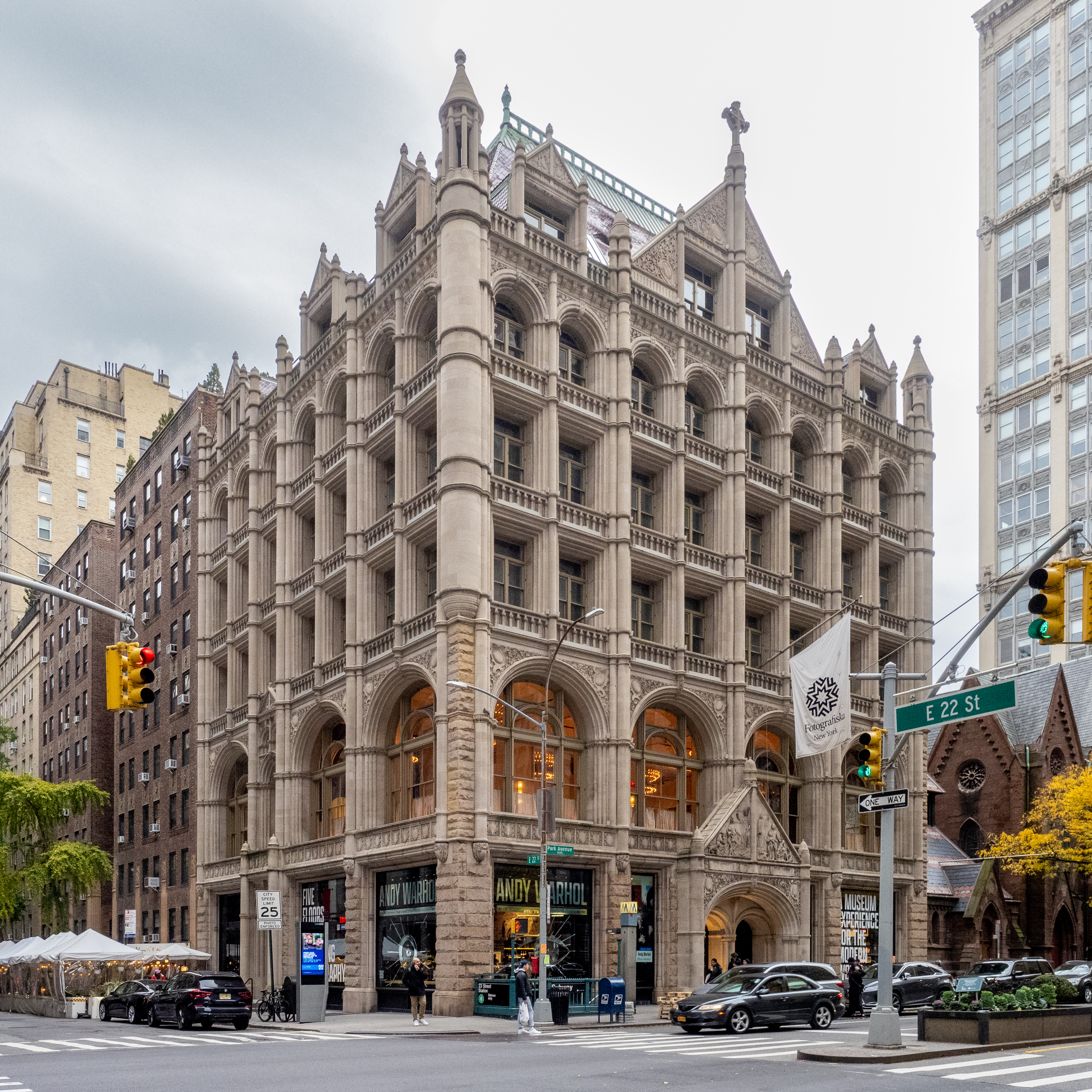
Church Missions House

In mid-2013, Delvey traveled to New York City to attend New York Fashion Week. Finding it easier to make friends in New York than Paris, she opted to stay, transferring to Purple's New York office for a brief time. After quitting Purple, Delvey came up with the idea of the "Anna Delvey Foundation"—a private members' club and art foundation—and unsuccessfully sought funding from wealthy members of the city's social scene. Her proposal included leasing the entire Church Missions House, comprising six floors and 45,000 sq ft (4,200 m^{2}) and owned by Aby Rosen's RFR Holdings, as a multipurpose events venue and art studio, where she planned a visual arts center with pop-up shops curated by artist Daniel Arsham, one of her acquaintances from her internship, and exhibitions by Urs Fischer, Damien Hirst, Jeff Koons, and Tracey Emin. She received planning help from the son of architect Santiago Calatrava. She also discussed the sale of drinks at the venue with Roo Rogers.

DJ Elle Dee described a strange encounter with Delvey at a party in May 2014 in Montauk, New York, where Delvey pretended to be a wealthy heiress and bragged about the brands of clothes she was wearing, but also asked partygoers for a place to sleep. After they declined, she slept in a car. Dee also attended another party that Delvey organized at The Standard, High Line saying about the attendees that: "She barely knew them—as if it was maybe the second time they'd ever met, kind of like us. Everyone just sat around, quietly staring at their own phones." Dee called Delvey "entitled and mean," particularly to people in the service industry. She castigated people who did not have many followers on Instagram and bragged that she was going to rent a $12,000-per-month six-bedroom rooftop apartment. Dee also said that Delvey often relied on her and other acquaintances to pay her expenses, claiming she had forgotten her wallet or that it was an emergency and her credit cards did not work, shedding crocodile tears that dried up quickly when she realized the scheme would not work.

In 2015, Delvey met the art collector and University of Pennsylvania student Michael Xufu Huang at a dinner party. Learning that Huang planned to attend the Venice Biennale, Delvey asked whether she could accompany him. Huang agreed and booked a flight and hotel room for Delvey on the understanding that he would be reimbursed for the $2,000–$3,000 cost. On their return to New York, Delvey did not repay Huang. Huang initially assumed that Delvey was simply absent-minded. Also in 2015, Delvey attended Art Basel in Miami Beach. She hired a public relations firm to book a birthday party for herself at Sadelle's restaurant in January 2016; after her credit card was declined and pictures of Huang at the event were posted on social media, restaurant staff asked Huang for Delvey's contact details. At this time Huang became suspicious of Delvey and noticed that she always paid with cash and lived in a hotel, not an apartment. He was eventually repaid from a Venmo account with an unfamiliar name. He then blocked Delvey's access to him on social media, ending their friendship.

In February 2016, while Delvey was living in a hotel room in The Standard, High Line, she met Rachel DeLoache Williams, then a photo editor at Vanity Fair, at a nightclub. Williams became close friends with Delvey and was later instrumental in her arrest.

Delvey used Microsoft Word to create fake bank statements and other financial documents purporting to show that she had €60 million in Swiss bank accounts but could not access them since they were in trust and she was in the U.S. One of her acquaintances put her in touch with lawyer Andrew Lance at Gibson Dunn, who in turn put her in touch with several large financial institutions, including City National Bank and Fortress Investment Group. In November 2016, Delvey submitted false documents as part of a loan application for $22 million to City National. City National refused to extend credit when Delvey failed to provide the source of the Swiss assets, and she then applied for a loan from Fortress. Fortress agreed to consider the application if Delvey paid $100,000 to cover legal expenses relating to the application. In December 2016, with Delvey unable to pay rent, the Church Missions House was leased to Fotografiska New York.

On January 12, 2017, Delvey convinced City National to grant her a temporary overdraft facility for $100,000, on the promise that it would be repaid promptly. She provided fake AOL email addresses for "Peter Hennecke", a nonexistent business manager; when suspicions arose, Delvey claimed that he had died, and invented a new persona, "Bettina Wagner". Prosecutors in her trial later showed that she had used Google to query "create fake untraceable email". Delvey remitted the $100,000 to Fortress for the loan application but a managing director at Fortress became suspicious of Delvey's application due to discrepancies in her paperwork: for example, she claimed to be of German heritage, but her passport said she was born in Russia. When the director arranged to verify Delvey's assets by meeting her bankers in Switzerland, she withdrew the loan application. In February 2017, the $55,000 portion of the overdraft not spent by Fortress as part of the due diligence process was returned to Delvey. She then spent lavishly on luxury clothes, electronics, and a personal trainer, as well as $800 hair highlighting and $400 eyelash extensions.

On February 18, 2017, Delvey checked into a $400/night room at the 11 Howard hotel in Soho, Manhattan. She often gave a $100 cash gratuity to the concierge, whom she befriended, and other employees for simple tasks such as restaurant recommendations or bringing packages to her room. Still, most of the staff found Delvey annoying and described her comments as impolite and classist. Delvey became comfortable at the hotel and regularly walked around in leggings or a hotel robe, often dining at Le Coucou, the hotel restaurant, where she befriended chef Daniel Rose and billed her meals to her room. She treated the concierge to massages, manicures, and sessions with the celebrity personal trainer Kacy Duke.

After management discovered that there was no credit card on file for Delvey, they insisted that she settle her $30,000 bill. Delvey had a case of 1975 Dom Pérignon champagne delivered to the staff in an attempt to keep them on her side; hotel policy prevented the staff from accepting it. By March 2017, Delvey had run out of money. She would offer to take friends out for drinks and dinner but when it was time to pay the bill, she would claim that she had forgotten her credit cards or that her credit cards would not work. By this time, Delvey was very active in the New York social scene; she attended dinner parties where she met Macaulay Culkin and Martin Shkreli.

In April 2017, Delvey deposited $160,000 worth of fraudulent checks into a Citibank account, from which she was able to withdraw $70,000. She then wired $30,000 to 11 Howard to pay the outstanding bill.

In May 2017, by sending a forged wire transfer confirmation from Deutsche Bank for the $35,390 fee, Delvey booked a return charter flight on a business jet via Blade Air Mobility to Omaha, Nebraska, to attend the annual meeting of Berkshire Hathaway with the goal of meeting Warren Buffett. Delvey had allegedly met Blade CEO Robert S. Wiesenthal, but Wiesenthal later said he did not know her at all. Blade reported her to the police in August 2017 after repeated failure to pay. Delvey later claimed that during the trip she snuck into a private party at the Henry Doorly Zoo and Aquarium, where she met Bill Gates.

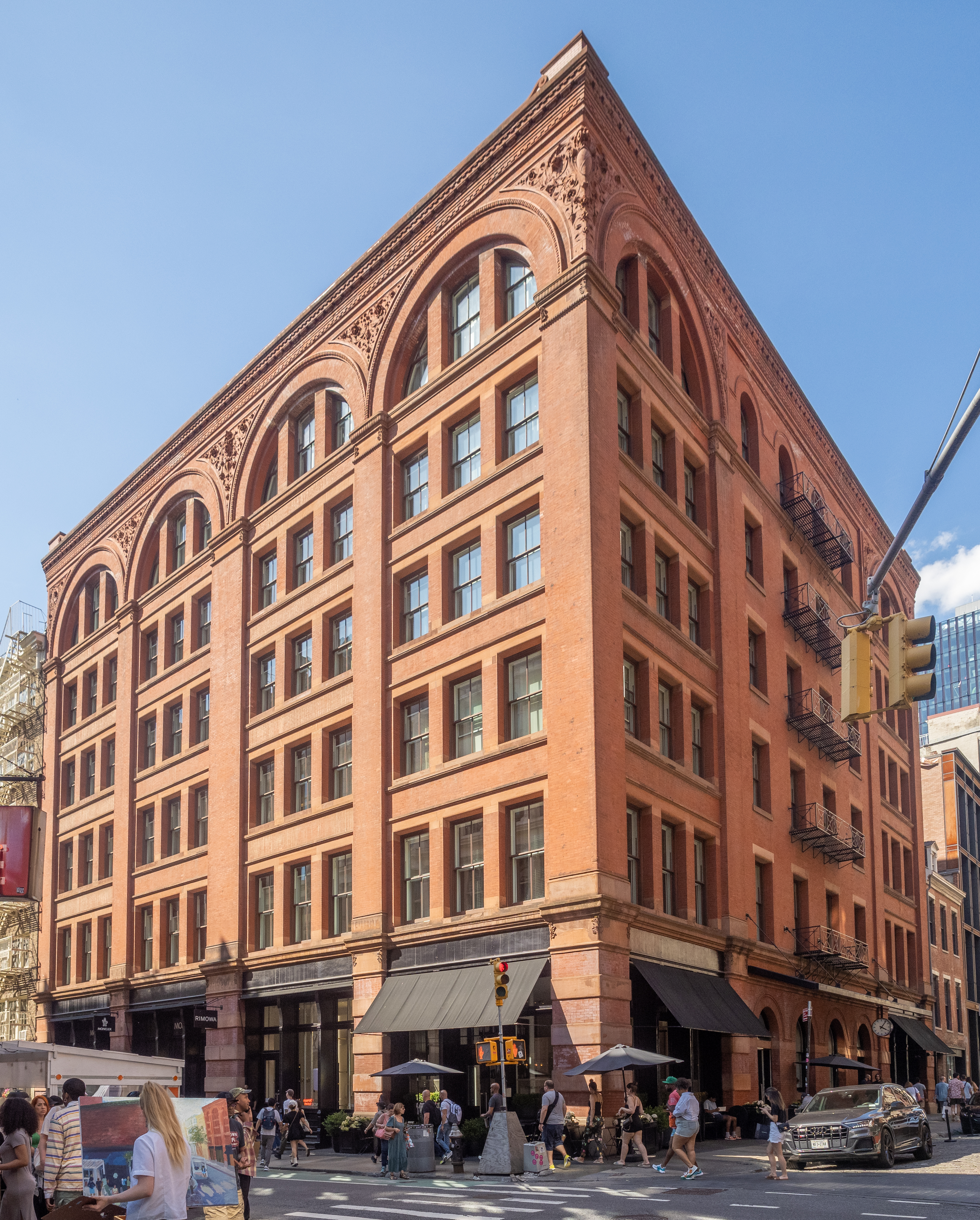
The Mercer Hotel

Since Delvey still refused to provide a credit card to the 11 Howard hotel, the entry code to her room was changed while she was in Omaha and her belongings were placed in storage. As retribution, using a tactic she learned from Martin Shkreli, she purchased the domain names corresponding to the names of the hotel managers and emailed them asking for a ransom of $1 million each. After three months of living at 11 Howard, with the help of her friend Rachel DeLoache Williams, Delvey moved her belongings to The Mercer Hotel. She also stayed two nights at The Bowery Hotel, sending the hotel a fake wire transfer receipt from Deutsche Bank.

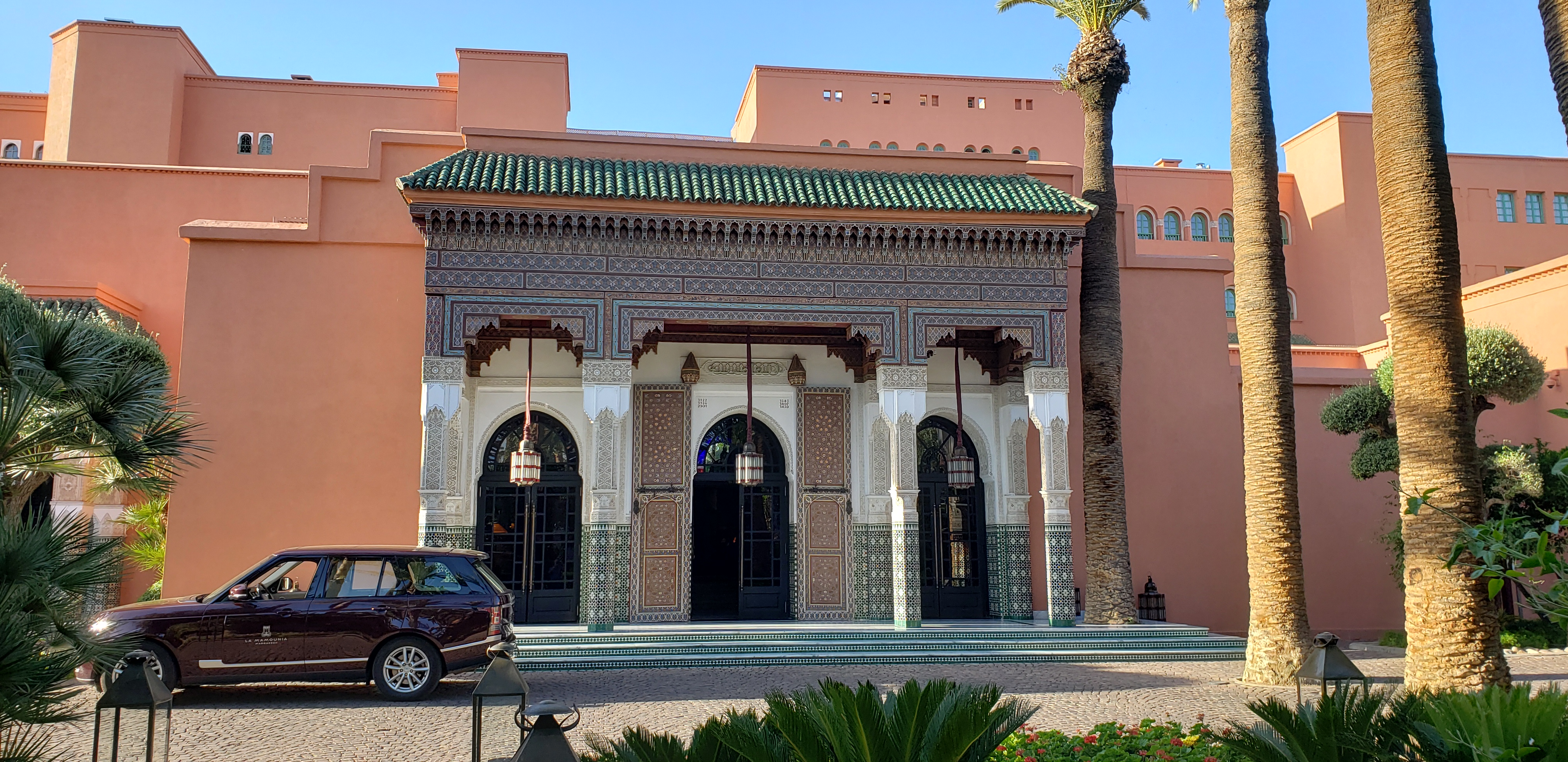
La Mamounia

In May 2017, Delvey invited Williams, Kacy Duke, and her videographer on what she said was an "all-expenses-paid" journey to Morocco, supposedly because she needed to "reset" her Electronic System for Travel Authorization (ESTA). Inspired by Khloé Kardashian, Delvey booked a $7,000/night riad with three bedrooms, a private swimming pool, and a dedicated butler at La Mamounia, a 5-star luxury hotel in Marrakesh, with plans to make "a behind-the-scenes documentary" on the creation of her foundation.

After a few days, staff said that they were unable to charge Delvey's credit cards and demanded an alternative form of payment. Delvey gave excuses, blaming the staff for typing in the numbers wrong, or their systems for being down. The lack of a valid credit card on file led to a hotel staff member being fired. Delvey convinced Williams to pay the $62,000 bill, which was more than a year of Williams' net salary, using her work and personal credit cards, promising to reimburse her via wire transfer. Williams had also paid for the flights to Morocco, items Delvey purchased, and a private tour of Majorelle Garden using her credit cards, with promises by Delvey to be reimbursed.

Despite repeated promises from Delvey, and one excuse after another, Williams was repaid only $5,000 and had to borrow money from friends to pay her rent. American Express later removed approximately $52,000 of the charges on her credit cards. After contacting other acquaintances who had also lent money to Delvey and were not repaid, and who had all heard different backstories on Delvey's parents' alleged wealth, Williams realized that Delvey was committing fraud.

In Morocco, Delvey also stayed at Kasbah Tamadot, a Virgin Limited Edition luxury hotel, and at the Four Seasons Hotels and Resorts in Casablanca, where she asked Duke, who had already returned to New York due to a food-borne illness, to pay for the room. When Duke also offered to pay for a flight back to New York for Delvey, she asked for first-class travel. Delvey drank fine wines and the most expensive champagnes and took a helicopter to the airport in Casablanca.

Returning to New York later in May, Delvey relocated to the Beekman Hotel. Twenty days later, in June 2017, having accumulated a bill of $11,518 and failing to pay despite repeated promises, she was evicted. She then attempted a similar scam at the W New York Downtown Hotel and Residences, failing to pay her $503.76 bill; she was evicted after two days and charged with theft of services. By July 5, Delvey was homeless. She then interrupted Duke in the middle of a date, crying and pressuring her into providing lodging. She also asked Williams for lodging, again in a crying tantrum; Williams refused. Delvey also tried to dine and dash at the restaurant at the Le Parker Meridien hotel. When caught, she claimed to police that she could get a friend to pay the bill in five minutes. At this time, the Manhattan District Attorney was investigating her for bank fraud.

On August 17 and 21, 2017, Delvey allegedly deposited two bad checks worth $15,000 into her account at Signature Bank and over the next few days, she withdrew approximately $8,200 in cash before the checks were returned.

== Indictment and arrest ==
Delvey was arrested on October 3, 2017, in a sting operation planned by Michael McCaffrey, a police officer with the New York Police Department working with the Manhattan District Attorney's office. To facilitate the sting, McCaffrey worked closely with Williams. At the time, Delvey was staying at Passages Malibu, a luxury rehab/addiction treatment facility in California.

To convince Delvey to enter a more public venue where an arrest would be more easily effected, McCaffrey had Williams arrange a lunch meeting at a restaurant outside the facility. When Delvey left the facility, Los Angeles Police Department officers arrested her. Later that month, a grand jury convened by Manhattan District Attorney Cyrus Vance Jr. indicted Delvey on two counts of attempted grand larceny in the first degree, three counts of grand larceny in the second degree, one count of grand larceny in the third degree, and one count of misdemeanor theft of services for the fraudulent loan applications made to City National and Fortress, the check fraud, the cost of the trip to Morocco, and the unpaid hotel and restaurant bills.

== Trial, conviction, and sentence ==
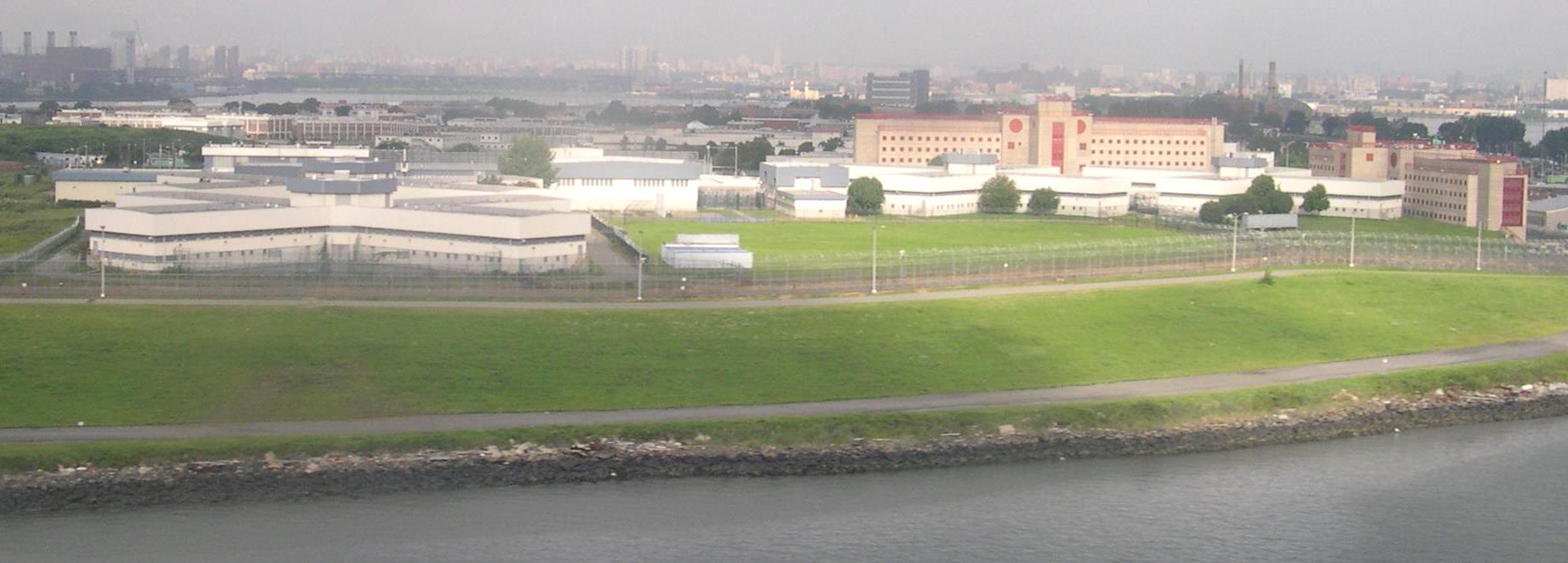
Rikers Island

On December 18, 2018, Delvey appeared in New York City Criminal Court and rejected a plea deal that offered three to nine years in prison. Her trial started on March 20, 2019, presided over by Judge Diane Kiesel. Until the end of the trial, Delvey was incarcerated at Rikers Island, where she had 13 infractions for misbehavior such as fighting and disobeying orders, and was placed in solitary confinement during Christmas.

At her request, Delvey's defense attorney arranged for a wardrobe stylist to source outfits for her court appearances. One day she swapped her Rikers Island uniform for a Michael Kors shift dress. The next day she paired a sheer black Saint Laurent top with Victoria Beckham trousers. One Friday she refused to enter the courtroom because she did not want to appear in her jail-issued clothing.

At trial, Delvey's lawyer defended her by saying that her intent all along was to repay her debts and that she received services in exchange for publicity on Instagram. He described her as an entrepreneur, comparing her to Frank Sinatra, claiming they both created a "golden opportunity" in New York.

On April 25, 2019, after deliberating for two days, the jury found Delvey guilty of eight charges, including grand larceny in the second degree, attempted grand larceny, and theft of services. Delvey was found not guilty of two other charges: one of attempted grand larceny in the first degree relating to the original loan application with City National, and one of larceny in the second degree relating to the alleged theft of $62,000 from Rachel Williams in Marrakesh.

In an interview before her sentencing, Delvey said, "I'd be lying to you and to everyone else and to myself if I said I was sorry for anything." On May 9, 2019, she was sentenced to 4 to 12 years in state prison, fined $24,000, and ordered to pay restitution of $199,000, including $100,000 to City National, $70,000 to Citibank, and approximately two-thirds of the amount owed to Blade. These amounts, as well as approximately $75,000 in legal fees related to the trial, were paid from proceeds of Delvey's $320,000 deal with Netflix; the court allowed Delvey to keep the remaining $22,000. Delvey was not forced to pay the $160,000 in legal fees owed to Perkins Coie related to the unsuccessful lease of Church Missions House, $65,000 in legal fees due to Gibson Dunn related to the unsuccessful $22 million loan application, or $30,000 in legal fees due to Lowenstein Sandler.

After the trial, Delvey, inmate #19G0366 of the New York State Department of Corrections, was initially housed at Bedford Hills Correctional Facility for Women before being transferred to Albion Correctional Facility. On February 11, 2021, she was released from prison on parole. After release, she checked in to The NoMad hotel and hired a German camera crew to follow her and film her activities.

== ICE custody and house arrest ==
Six weeks after her release on parole, on March 25, 2021, Immigration and Customs Enforcement (ICE) took Delvey into custody for overstaying her visa. ICE held her in a New Jersey county jail to await deportation to Germany, which she legally contested. An immigration judge ruled that if Delvey were freed, she "would have the ability and inclination to continue to commit fraudulent and dishonest acts".

In January 2022, Delvey tested positive for COVID-19 in jail and was placed in quarantine. While still in jail on March 1, 2022, she joined a class-action suit filed by the American Civil Liberties Union. Delvey alleged that ICE refused multiple requests for a COVID-19 vaccine booster. She had received the one-dose Johnson & Johnson vaccine the previous April.

In October 2022, Delvey was granted a $10,000 bail bond and released from jail. She was required to remain in 24-hour home confinement with electronic monitoring and no access to social media. Her house arrest was being served at a 470-square-foot (44 m^{2}) apartment in the East Village, Manhattan.

Early in 2024, Delvey was allowed to move her house arrest to the Hudson Valley home of her friend Kelly Cutrone.

In August 2024, Delvey's access to social media was restored, and her house arrest was extended to a 75-mile (121 km) radius of the home.

== Media representation ==
In 2018, after Jessica Pressler published an article on Delvey in New York, Netflix paid Delvey $320,000 for the rights to her life story. But the New York Attorney General's office sued Delvey in 2019 using the state's Son of Sam law, which prohibits those convicted of a crime from profiting from its publicity, and forced the majority of these funds to be used for restitution and fines per the judgment.

In July 2019, My Friend Anna, a book by Rachel DeLoache Williams, was published by Gallery Publishing Group, an imprint of Simon & Schuster, as well as by Quercus in the UK and Goldmann in Germany. Williams received $300,000 for the book, in which she details her experiences with Delvey, including how the trip to Marrakesh affected her financially and mentally. Screenwriter Lena Dunham paid Williams $35,000 for an option to the television rights to her story but did not exercise it, so the story rights returned to Williams.

Delvey's story has been the subject of an episode of American Greed by CNBC, an episode of Generation Hustle by HBO Max, an episode of 20/20, in which Deborah Roberts interviewed Delvey in ICE custody, and an episode of 60 Minutes, in which Liam Bartlett interviewed her.

In December 2019, Delvey's story was the subject of Fake Heiress, a drama-documentary podcast by journalist Vicky Baker and playwright Chloe Moss released by BBC Radio 4, starring Bella Dayne as Delvey. In the 2020 American television series Katy Keene, the character of Pepper Smith, played by Julia Chan, is loosely based on Delvey.

In late July and early August 2021, Anna X, a stage play inspired by Delvey's story by Joseph Charlton starring Emma Corrin and Nabhaan Rizwan ran at the Harold Pinter Theatre in London and The Lowry in Salford.

Shonda Rhimes created Netflix's nine-episode series Inventing Anna. In it, Julia Garner plays Delvey. It was released in February 2022 and was the most-watched show on Netflix the week it was released.

In 2022, Delvey signed a deal with Bunim/Murray Productions to star in a reality television series about her life after prison. She is also working on a book about her time in jail and a podcast. In May 2022, Delvey joined sisters Paris Hilton and Nicky Rothschild on an episode of Hilton's podcast This is Paris.

In May 2025, Delvey was featured in a New Yorker magazine article titled, "Power Houses: Inside the Living Rooms of Notable New Yorkers".

== After prison ==
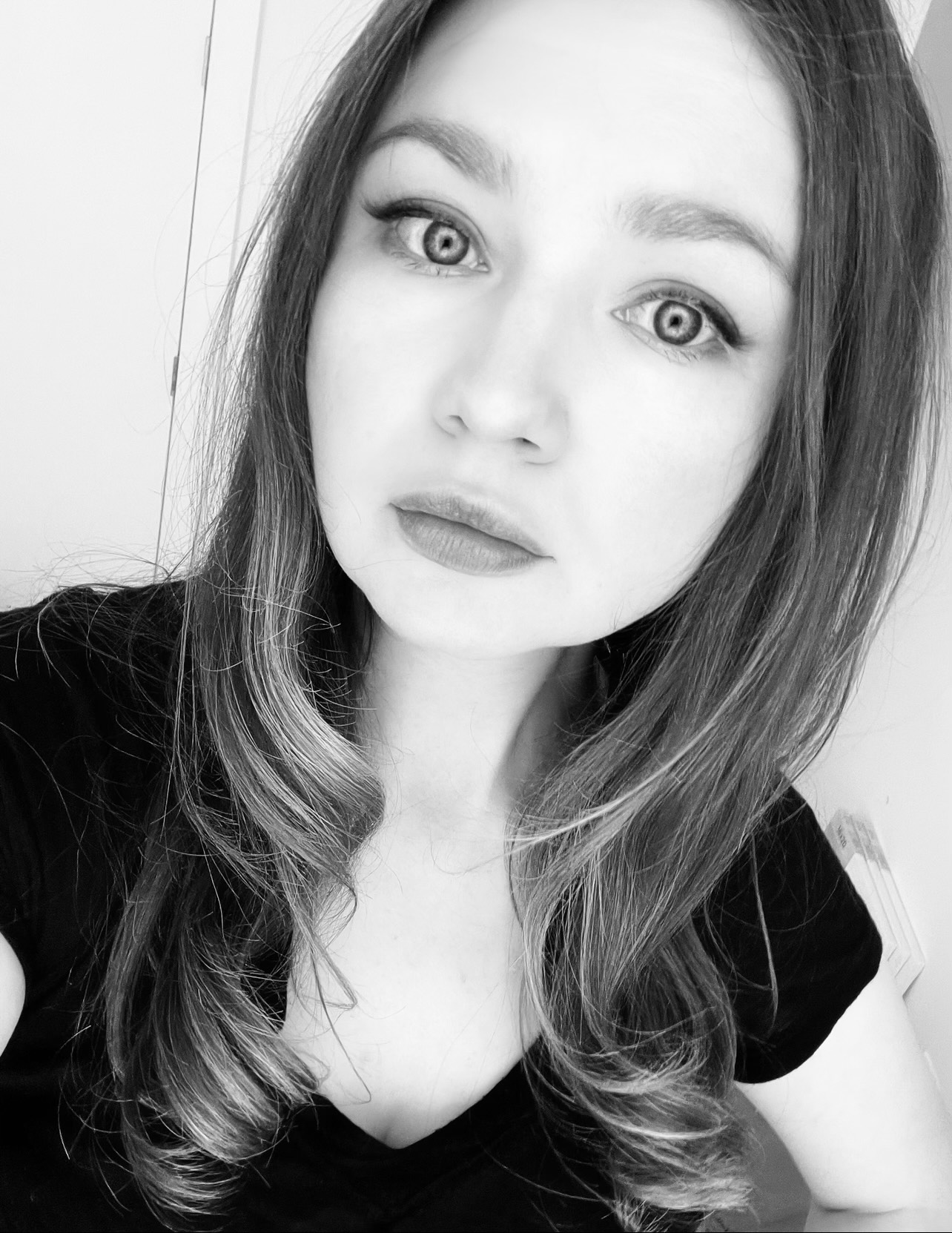
Delvey in 2022

As of December 2022, Delvey had sold $340,000 worth of art. The proceeds were used to post bail and pay three months of rent for Delvey's $4,250/month one-bedroom East Village apartment.

=== Art shows ===
A pop-up group show called "Free Anna Delvey" ran at 176 Delancey Street on the Lower East Side from March 17 to March 24, 2022, while Delvey was incarcerated. The show incorporated art from 33 artists inspired by Delvey, including Noah Becker, publisher of Whitehot magazine. Each piece was listed for sale for $10,000. It was co-curated by Alfredo Martinez, who had been to prison for forging Jean-Michel Basquiat paintings, and Julia Morrison, who fronted $8,000 of her own money to fund the show but, as of May 2022, had not been repaid by Martinez. One of the pieces, Send Bitcoin, features a seated Delvey wearing a red dress while working on a computer and facing away from the viewer. Other pieces included Anna on ICE and ICE, both referring to U.S. Immigration and Customs Enforcement. UltraNYC called the pieces "doodles" and "part of her latest ploy to profit from her newfound fame". Grunge said the show "generally displayed [Delvey] in a sympathetic, if not overtly positive, light."

On May 19, 2022, while Delvey was incarcerated, "Allegedly" opened in a nightclub on the second floor of the Public Hotel in Manhattan. The show opened with Kanye West's song "Flashing Lights", followed by drag queen Yuhua Hamasaki hyping up the crowd. Models walked through the room holding Delvey's drawings in gold-plated frames and wearing white gloves, Versace sunglasses, and black stockings covering their heads and faces. Delvey addressed the crowd in a prerecorded message, saying the show was "my narrative from my perspective". The drawings were again priced at $10,000 each; Delvey said 15% of the proceeds would go to children's charities. Many reporters and publicists attended the show.

=== Non-fungible tokens ===
In June 2022, Delvey announced that she was launching a collection of non-fungible tokens. She created 10 such tokens that she said would give holders "exclusive access" to her.

=== Dancing with the Stars ===
In September 2024, Delvey participated in season 33 of the dancing competition TV show Dancing with the Stars. She was paired with professional dancer Ezra Sosa, and was required to wear her ICE-mandated ankle monitor during the program. Delvey was one of the first two celebrities eliminated, along with Tori Spelling.

=== Fashion ===
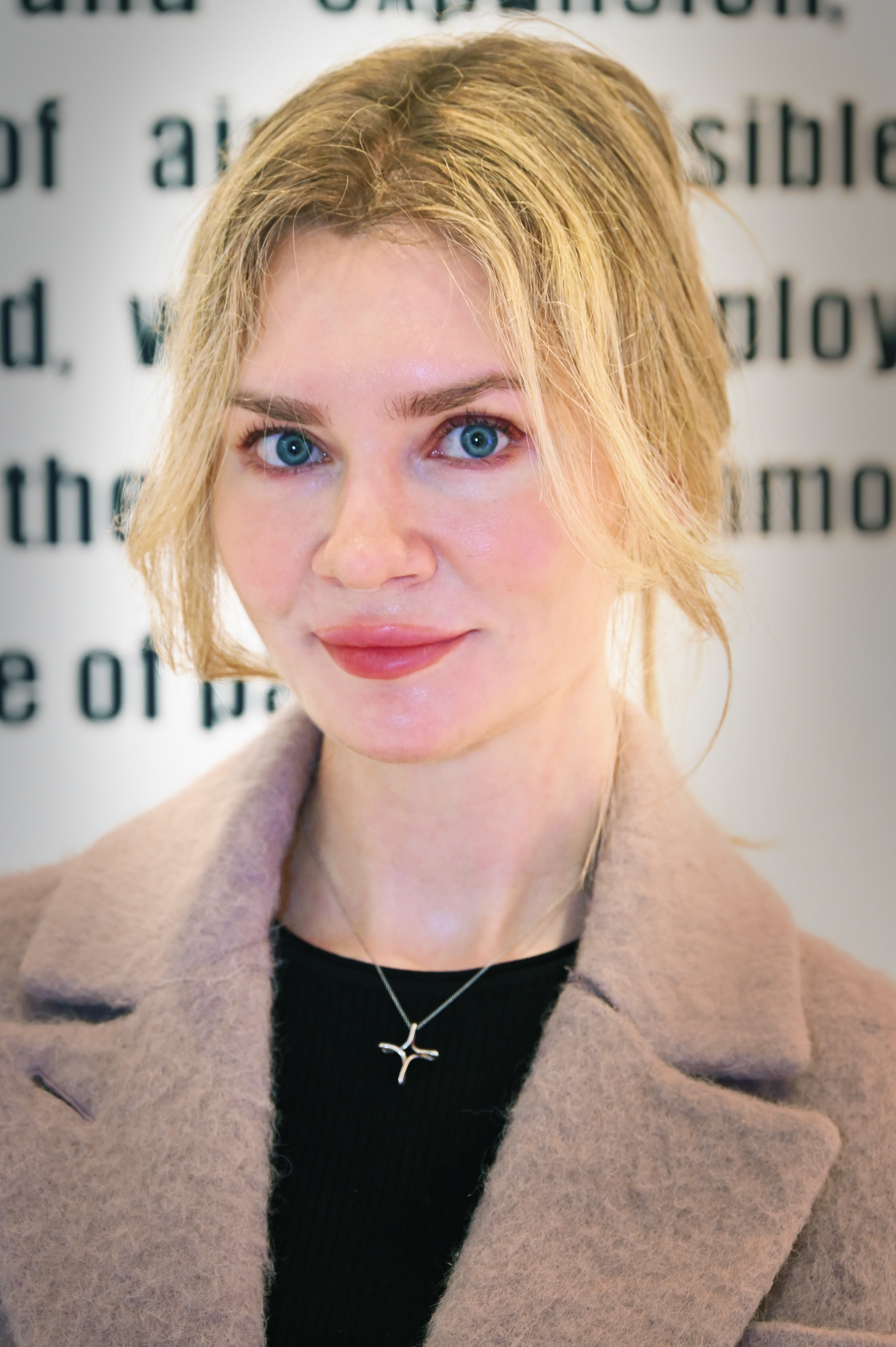
Delvey in 2025

On September 13, 2023, during New York Fashion Week, Delvey hosted an event on the roof of her apartment, where she was under house arrest. She worked with fashion publicist Kelly Cutrone. A year later, in September 2024, Delvey modeled for fashion brand SHAO New York during New York Fashion Week and again in February 2025 for Elena Velez and several other brands, sporting her ankle monitor.

== Personal life ==
Delvey maintains social media accounts, which she has described as satire, on Twitter and Instagram. Through Instagram, she connected with Julia Fox, with whom, as of February 2022, she was planning a collaboration. In January 2021, Delvey penned a sarcastic letter to Donald Trump in which she anticipated becoming a prisoner at Rikers Island. As a condition of her October 2022 release from ICE detention she was prohibited access to social media. The restriction was lifted in August 2024.

== See also ==
- List of con artists
