= Roselyn Keo =

American exotic dancer

- Born: 1984 (age 41–42); Rockland County, New York, U.S.
- Occupation: Dancer
- Known for: Convicted of tricking men into overspending in strip clubs
- Criminal charge: Credit card fraud
- Criminal penalty: Five years probation

Roselyn Keo (born 1984) is an American former exotic dancer who, along with a number of co-workers and peers, manipulated and drugged her clients into overspending in strip clubs.

Keo, who was raised by her grandmother in a small town outside New York City, started working as an exotic dancer when she was either sixteen or seventeen years old.

In 2007, Keo became friends with dancer Samantha Barbash. Barbash and Keo became co-conspirators in their scheme. Barbash was able to explain the economic benefit in clients being entertained by multiple dancers.

Many of Keo and Barbash's regular big-spending clients were impacted by the 2008 downturn. Keo was away from the club scene for several years after giving birth to a daughter. When she returned to working the club scene in 2012, she found that her friend Barbash was making more money than ever, while the clubs and dancers were not. Barbash was using a ploy where she would contact one of her old clients and arrange to meet him for a date. When the client had enough female attention and alcohol to be suggestible, co-workers of Barbash would show up and cajole him to taking them to a strip club. On several occasions they drugged the men surreptitiously with MDMA.

Several New York City strip clubs had arrangements with Barbash's team to share a portion from the target's credit card charges at the club. Barbash and her team would guide the target into a private room and then proceed to make sure that he spent heavily.

Law enforcement started tracking their activities in September 2014, and, in December 2014, Keo, Barbash, and three other individuals were arrested. Law enforcement officials could document that, during the investigation, they tricked or cajoled four men into spending $200,000.

Keo and Barbash pled guilty, and were given five years of probation. They were allowed to keep all the money.

In 2015 Jessica Pressler interviewed Keo and Barbash for an article in New York magazine. The expose earned Pressler a National Magazine Award nomination. A team of producers that included Will Ferrell "snapped up" the film rights in February, 2016. The story was adapted into a 2019 film by Gloria Sanchez Productions titled Hustlers, with Constance Wu playing Dorothy/Destiny, who was based on Keo.

Keo published her 111 page memoir, The Sophisticated Hustler with RK Models, Inc in 2019.

Keo, like her former colleague Barbash, claims aspects of the film they inspired are inaccurate. Keo claimed that she and Barbash were essentially equal partners, saying Barbash was the CEO, while she was the CFO.

== See also ==
- Diane Passage
