= Inventing Anna =

2022 American crime drama television miniseries

- Genre: Crime drama
- Created by: Shonda Rhimes
- Inspired by: "How Anna Delvey Tricked New York's Party People" by Jessica Pressler
- Starring: Anna Chlumsky; Julia Garner; Arian Moayed; Katie Lowes; Alexis Floyd; Anders Holm; Anna Deavere Smith; Jeff Perry; Terry Kinney; Laverne Cox
- Music by: Kris Bowers; Pierre Charles
- Country of origin: United States
- Original language: English
- No. of episodes: 9

Production
- Executive producers: Shonda Rhimes; Betsy Beers; Tom Verica; David Frankel
- Producers: Jess Brownell; Holden Chang; Jessica Pressler
- Cinematography: Maryse Alberti; David Franco; Tim Norman; Manuel Billeter
- Editors: Kayla M. Emter; Gregory T. Evans; Matt Pevic; Andrew Hellesen; Kyle Bond; Christal Atossa Khatib; Michael Hathaway
- Running time: 59–82 minutes
- Production company: Shondaland

Original release
- Network: Netflix
- Release: February 11, 2022

Inventing Anna is an American crime drama television miniseries created by Shonda Rhimes, inspired by the story of Anna Sorokin and the article in New York titled "How Anna Delvey Tricked New York's Party People" by Jessica Pressler. It was produced by Shondaland. Netflix released the miniseries on February 11, 2022.

The miniseries stars Julia Garner in the title role. Critics praised its performances (particularly Garner) but criticized its inconsistent tone.

== Premise ==
Under the assumed name Anna Delvey, Russian-born Anna Sorokin infiltrated New York's high society by convincing them she was a German socialite and an heiress to a massive fortune, all while scheming and scamming them out of millions.

== Cast and characters ==
=== Main ===
- Anna Chlumsky as Vivian Kent
- Julia Garner as Anna Sorokin/Delvey
- Arian Moayed as Todd Spodek
- Katie Lowes as Rachel Williams
- Alexis Floyd as Neff Davis
- Anders Holm as Jack
- Anna Deavere Smith as Maud
- Jeff Perry as Lou
- Terry Kinney as Barry
- Laverne Cox as Kacy Duke

=== Recurring ===
- Rebecca Henderson as ADA Catherine McCaw
- Kate Burton as Nora Radford
- Saamer Usmani as Chase Sikorski
- Tim Guinee as Paul
- Gabriel Sloyer as Gabriel Calatrava
- Armand Schultz as Landon Bloom
- Anthony Edwards as Alan Reed

=== Guest ===
- Caitlin FitzGerald as Mags
- James Cusati-Moyer as Val
- Marika Domińczyk as Talia Mallay
- Joshua Malina as Henrick Knight
- Christopher Lowell as Noah
- Ben Rappaport as Billy McFarland
- Will Stephen as Martin Shkreli
- Gemma McIlhenny as D.O.C. Officer
- Kieron J. Anthony as Dr. Millikan
- Tracy Pollan as Sherry Reed

== Episodes ==
No.	Title	Directed by	Written by	Original release date
1	"Life of a VIP"	David Frankel	Shonda Rhimes	February 11, 2022
2	"The Devil Wore Anna"	Tom Verica	Matt Byrne	February 11, 2022
3	"Two Birds, One Throne"	Daisy von Scherler Mayer	Jess Brownell	February 11, 2022
4	"A Wolf in Chic Clothing"	David Frankel	Abby Ajayi	February 11, 2022
5	"Check Out Time"	Ellen Kuras	Carolyn Ingber Lewinsky and Abby Ajayi	February 11, 2022
6	"Friends in Low Places"	Nzingha Stewart	Jess Brownell	February 11, 2022
7	"Cash on Delivery"	Nzingha Stewart	Abby Ajayi	February 11, 2022
8	"Too Rich for Her Blood"	Tom Verica	Nicholas Nardini	February 11, 2022
9	"Dangerously Close"	Ellen Kuras	Matt Byrne	February 11, 2022

== Production ==
In June 2018, Netflix and Shondaland acquired the rights to the life story of Anna Sorokin and the New York article "How Anna Delvey Tricked New York's Party People" by Jessica Pressler, with plans to turn it into a television series with Shonda Rhimes serving as producer and writer, alongside Betsy Beers. Sorokin received $320,000, which was used to pay restitution and legal fees. David Frankel was named as director and executive producer of two episodes of the series, including the first.

In October 2019, Julia Garner, Anna Chlumsky, Katie Lowes, Laverne Cox, and Alexis Floyd joined the cast of the series. Madeline Brewer was set to portray the role of Anna Delvey but had to pass due to scheduling conflicts. Also in October 2019, principal photography began in New York and Los Angeles.

In November 2019, Arian Moayed, Anders Holm, Anna Deavere Smith, Jeff Perry and Terry Kinney joined the cast of the series. In February 2020, Jennifer Esposito joined the cast of the series, but she never appeared and the part of Talia was played by Marika Dominczyk.

On February 11, 2022, Inventing Anna premiered on Netflix.

== Reception ==
=== Reviews ===
On review aggregator website Rotten Tomatoes, the series holds a 64% approval rating based on 87 reviews, with an average rating of 6.2/10. The website's critics consensus reads, "While Inventing Anna is as tonally wobbly as Julia Garner's intentionally daffy accent, her committed performance and the salacious story make for juicy entertainment." On Metacritic, the series has a score of 57 out of 100, based on 34 reviews, indicating "mixed or average reviews".

Saloni Gajjar of The A.V. Club gave the limited series a B− and said, "Despite its more evocative performances, Inventing Anna demands patience that doesn't pay off, squandering its promising potential along the way." Reviewing the series for Rolling Stone, Alan Sepinwall gave a rating of 2/5 and described it as "an overly long muddle, never quite sure what it wants to say about its title character, or how to say it."

Mike Hale, television critic at the New York Times, praised some elements of the series and criticized others. Notably, he compared the original thrilling nature of the article to the slower pace of the television series: "Pressler's article was like a speeding car, a thrill ride that kept your pulse up right until it went off a cliff. Inventing Anna is a long, pokey road trip with no G.P.S. All of Pressler's most colorful anecdotes and appalling details have been squeezed in, sometimes tweaked to fit better within what is now a fictional narrative. But the thrill is gone."

Hayley Maitland of Vogue faulted the series for misrepresenting a "Celine-obsessed grifter" as a "21st-century Jay Gatsby, with 281 Park Avenue standing in for Daisy Buchanan". She also noted that the series identified real person Rachel Deloache Williams by full name, real employer, real apartment location, and real alma mater but showed major falsehoods about her, including wearing expensive designer clothes given to her by Anna Delvey, even though Delvey never gave her any clothes; being fired for putting the unexpected $62,000 cost of the trip on her company credit card, even though she transferred the full amount to her personal credit card; and admitting at the courthouse right after giving her testimony that the credit card company had forgiven the debt, even though that did not happen until after the trial was over. Maitland also faults the series for demonizing Williams for doing essentially the same thing a sympathetic character does and points out that Williams is the victim most injured by Delvey.

=== Audience viewership ===
According to Samba TV, 1.6 million US households watched the Netflix series in its first 4 days of streaming.

The series is among Netflix's all-time most watched English language TV series, with 511.92 million hours watched in the first 28 days of release.

=== Accolades ===
Year	Award	Category	Nominee(s)	Result	Ref.
2022	Hollywood Music in Media Awards	Best Music Supervision – TV Show/Limited Series	Alexandra Patsavas	Nominated	
2022	Location Managers Guild International Awards	Outstanding Locations in a Television Serial Program, Anthology or Limited Series	Kristin Dombroski, John Cefalu, Youssef Abbagourram, Markus Bensch, Damon Gordon, and Maya Reid	Nominated	
2022	MTV Movie & TV Awards	Best Show	Inventing Anna	Nominated	
2022	Primetime Emmy Awards	Outstanding Limited or Anthology Series	Shonda Rhimes, Betsy Beers, Tom Verica, Matt Byrne, Kathy Ciric, Scott Collins, Alison Eakle, Sara Fischer, Abby Ajayi, Jess Brownell, Holden Chang, and Jessica Pressler	Nominated	
2022	Primetime Emmy Awards	Outstanding Lead Actress in a Limited or Anthology Series or Movie	Julia Garner	Nominated	
2022	Primetime Creative Arts Emmy Awards	Outstanding Casting for a Limited or Anthology Series or Movie	Linda Lowy, Jamie Castro, Allison Estrin, Henry Russell Bergstein, Juliette Ménager, Simone Bär, and Alexandra Montag	Nominated	
2023	AARP Movies for Grownups Awards	Best TV Movie/Limited Series	Inventing Anna	Nominated	
2023	Artios Awards	Limited Series	Linda Lowy, Henry Russell Bergstein, Allison Estrin, Jamie Castro, Simone Bär, Juliette Menager, and Dayna Katz	Nominated	
2023	Critics' Choice Television Awards	Best Actress in a Limited Series or Movie Made for Television	Julia Garner	Nominated	
2023	Directors Guild of America Awards	Outstanding Directorial Achievement in Movies for Television and Limited Series	Tom Verica (for "The Devil Wore Anna")	Nominated	
2023	Golden Globe Awards	Best Actress in a Limited Series, Anthology Series or Motion Picture Made for Television	Julia Garner	Nominated	
2023	Producers Guild of America Awards	David L. Wolper Award for Outstanding Producer of Limited or Anthology Series Television	Inventing Anna	Nominated	
2023	Screen Actors Guild Awards	Outstanding Performance by a Female Actor in a Television Movie or Limited Series	Julia Garner	Nominated	
