= Kacy Duke =

American fitness instructor

- Occupations: Fitness instructor, life coach, spokesmodel

Kacy Duke is an American celebrity fitness instructor, life coach, and spokesmodel.

== Career ==
Duke runs a personal training business called The Art of the Graceful Gangster. She also runs a business called Age Defying Physique.

Duke has trained celebrities including Denzel Washington, Dakota Johnson, Julianne Moore, P.Diddy, Iman, Josh Brolin, Maxwell, Rachel Weisz, Kiefer Sutherland, Lenny Kravitz, Bebe Rexha, Kate Beckinsale, Bruce Willis, and Gwen Stefani.

She was the founding Group Fitness Director at Equinox, a luxury fitness club. She developed fitness programs for Equinox and for corporations in North America, Europe, and Japan. She was a spokesperson for Dove Deodorant, Kellogg's, and Nike as well as a spokesperson and advisory board member of Simple Skincare. She has appeared on CBS Morning News, The Rachael Ray Show, Good Housekeeping TV, The Today Show, and Good Morning America.

Along with Darlene Williams, Duke co-hosts the podcast Real Ass Women, where she interviews successful business women.

== Friendship with Anna Sorokin ==
Duke became affiliated with Anna Sorokin, a Russian con artist posing as a German heiress using the name "Anna Delvey", when she was hired to be Sorokin's personal trainer and life coach. Sorokin, who had found Duke online, paid Duke $4,500 in cash for a package of sessions. Duke accompanied Sorokin and Rachel DeLoache Williams on a trip to La Mamounia in Marrakesh in May 2017. She was sick for the majority of the vacation, and booked a flight back to the United States with Williams' help. After Duke left Morocco, Sorokin pressured Williams to pay for the $62,000 trip when her credit card was declined. After Sorokin started experiencing financial trouble and was kicked out of the hotel she had been residing at, Duke let her stay at her apartment. In August 2017, Duke attempted to stage an intervention for Sorokin at the Frying Pan Bar in Manhattan. A day after the attempted intervention, Duke and Williams became aware of an ongoing criminal investigation against Sorokin.

== Personal life ==
Duke lives in Hudson Yards in New York City.

== Portrayal in popular culture ==
She is portrayed by Laverne Cox in the 2022 Netflix drama series Inventing Anna. She was a consultant for the series.
