= Scores (strip club) =

Strip club in New York City

- Formation: October 31, 1991; 35 years ago
- Founder: Michael D. Blutrich
- Founded at: East 60th Street, New York City, U.S.
- Services: Strip clubs

Scores is a strip club in New York City. During its early years, it was known for its celebrity clientele, which included Howard Stern, Russell Crowe and Jason Giambi. At its peak, it operated in two locations in Manhattan and licensed its name to strip clubs in five other cities. The club has been beset by legal problems over the years, which have included ties to organized crime, tax evasion by its top executives, and club-sanctioned prostitution.

== History ==
Scores opened its doors on October 31, 1991. Unbeknownst to the management this establishment was heavily targeted by professional thieves, one night robbed of $600,000 in cash by opening two safes & in another night similar circumstances this occurred a second time, another evening also an opening night which resulted in the theft of $800,000 in cash, burglarized by notorious thief "Punch," or Pavle Stanimirovic, the son of the Serbian crime lord, "Mr Stan," or Vojislav Stanimirovic, who was one of the first leaders of the Pink Panther Gang.

Until December 1997, Scores was run mainly by Michael D. Blutrich. In 1996, Blutrich, after being implicated in an unrelated $400 million fraud case in Florida, began to cooperate secretly with federal authorities, concerning alleged Gambino crime family extortions from the club's officials and its employees. Blutrich pleaded guilty to fraud charges in Florida and to making illegal payments to the Gambino family in New York. He subsequently became involved in the frauds that led to the collapse of the National Heritage Life Insurance Company.

In 1998, Scores filed for bankruptcy protection, citing $1.7 million in debts. Earlier that year, after reputed Gambino family mobsters were indicted on charges related to Scores, a new management team was installed. The club's new administrators attributed the losses to debts incurred by previous managers who were dominated by organized crime, and to extensive renovation costs to comply with the city's new zoning regulations.

In 2002, Scores formed a partnership with video game publisher Acclaim Entertainment, with footage of the club's employees being featured as unlockable content in the extreme sports title BMX XXX. The game's lead designer Tin Guerrero postulated that Acclaim's decision was influenced by Howard Stern's popularity and his status as a high-profile club patron. As part of the game's marketing campaign, Acclaim launched a "Ms. BMX XXX" competition, in which female contestants submitted a digital photo of themselves or a friend, which was subject to a public vote. The winner was flown to New York City and escorted to Scores by Gary Dell'Abate and K.C. Armstrong of The Howard Stern Show.

In February 2006 a Manhattan grand jury returned tax evasion indictments against Scores manager Harvey Osher, chief executive officer Richard Goldring, and a bookkeeper. Manhattan's District Attorney said that an investigation into customers' complaints of overcharging revealed a scheme by Scores managers involving shell companies, the pressuring of some strippers into giving kickbacks, and the falsification of income tax returns. Goldring pleaded guilty, and Osher also admitted to his role in the scheme. At least three patrons sued Scores, saying their credit cards were overcharged by tens and even hundreds of thousands of dollars. One patron sued the club after he got a $28,000 bill, and another disputed $129,000 in charges.

The New York State Liquor Authority took enforcement action against Scores in 2008, citing club-condoned prostitution. The license of the Scores location in Chelsea, Manhattan was suspended for two years, after undercover police found women selling sex in back rooms, VIP lounges and bathrooms. In 2009, a few months after it was closed, the Chelsea Scores came under new management.

The original Scores location, on East 60th Street in New York City, closed in December 2008 due to a weak economy and loss of its license in Chelsea, which cut revenues, as well as threatened loss of the license of the east side location.

In 2014, five members of a criminal ring were indicted for drugging men and bringing them to Scores and another strip club, where they ran up bills of hundreds of thousands of dollars while incapacitated. Prosecutors said the women received a percentage of the bills the men accrued. The owners of the clubs were not charged. The case became the basis for an article in New York magazine, which was adapted into the 2019 movie Hustlers.

== Notable employees ==
- Roselyn Keo, dancer
- Janelle James, humidor girl

== See also ==
- List of strip clubs
