= Rachel L. Williams =

British biomaterials engineer

Rachel L. Williams is a British biomaterials engineer whose research involves the bulk and surface properties of materials used in medical applications, and specifically in the eyes and mouth, including the treatment of detached retinas and the improvement of oral hygiene. She is Professor of Ophthalmic Bioengineering in the Department of Eye and Vision Science at the University of Liverpool.

== Education and career ==
Williams has a 1982 bachelor's degree in engineering science from the University of Exeter. After a master's degree in biomedical engineering from the University of California, Davis in 1984, she returned to the UK for a Ph.D. in clinical engineering at the University of Liverpool, completed in 1987.

She has been a professor at the University of Liverpool since 1992, and was named as Professor of Ophthalmic Bioengineering in 2012.

== Recognition ==
Williams received the Biocompatibles Endowed Award of the UKSB Council in 2007, the Worshipful Company of Armourers and Brasiers Materials Science Venture Prize in 2009, the Recognising Inspirational Scientists and Engineers (RISE) Award of the Engineering and Physical Sciences Research Council in 2014, the President's Prize of the UK Society for Biomaterials in 2018, and the Chapman Medal of the Institute of Materials, Minerals and Mining in 2022.

She was elected as a Fellow of the Royal Academy of Engineering (FREng) in 2018. She is also a Fellow of the Institute of Materials, Minerals and Mining (FIMMM).
