= Benjamin Wallace (writer) =

American author and magazine writer

- Born: 1968 or 1969 (age 57–58)
- Education: Georgetown University
- Occupations: Author, magazine writer
- Spouse: Jessica Pressler (m. 2008; div. 2022)
- Website: benjaminwallace.net

Benjamin Wallace is an American author and magazine writer known for his books The Billionaire's Vinegar and The Mysterious Mr. Nakamoto.

== Early life, family and education ==
Benjamin Wallace was raised in Washington, D.C., the son of Daphne Wallace and Don Wallace Jr. His father was a professor emeritus of international law at Georgetown University. In eighth grade, he decided to be a writer.

Wallace graduated from Georgetown with a degree in English and a minor in philosophy.

== Career ==
Wallace is a contributing editor for Vanity Fair. He has written for New York magazine. Wallace often writes about technology and was one of the first journalists to cover Bitcoin in a mainstream publication.

Earlier in his career, after briefly teaching and writing in the Czech Republic and Hungary, he moved to New York and spent two years working for a financial newsletter. Wallace then worked for Philadelphia magazine in which he spent his last three years at the magazine as its executive editor.

=== The Billionaire's Vinegar ===
External videos
- Wallace's TED talk on the price of happiness in which he discusses Rodenstock's alleged wine bottles

In 2008, Wallace published The Billionaire's Vinegar, subtitled The Mystery of the World’s Most Expensive Bottle of Wine, a book about Hardy Rodenstock's alleged Thomas Jefferson wine bottles. It debuted at #10 on the New York Times bestseller list. The Economist described it as “a great tale, well told,” and The New York Times called it “one of the rare books on wine that transcends the genre.”

In 2009, Michael Broadbent who auctioned some of Rodenstock's bottles, sued Random House, the publisher of The Billionaire's Vinegar for libel, claiming the book made allegations that he had behaved unprofessionally. In the settlement, Random House apologized for the allegations and issued a statement in court accepting that they were not true. Random House also paid an undisclosed amount of damages to Broadbent and agreed not to distribute the book in the UK. Wallace said, "I have never felt that Mr. Broadbent acted in bad faith, and contrary to his claims, I maintain that The Billionaire's Vinegar does not suggest that he did."

Todd Black, James Lassiter, Jason Blumenthal, Steve Tisch and Will Smith bought the rights to Wallace's book before it was published in 2008. In 2012, it was reported that they were developing a movie about the book starring Brad Pitt, but it was later reported that the movie would star Matthew McConaughey. The film will be distributed by Sony Pictures and the script will be written by Michael Brandt and Derek Haas.

== Personal life ==
On April 26, 2008, he married Jessica Pressler, an editor at New York magazine at the National Society of the Colonial Dames of America. Sean E. Mullen, an Episcopal priest, officiated the wedding, and Gerard Sloyan, a Roman Catholic priest, participated in the ceremony. The couple later divorced.
