= Rachel DeLoache Williams =

American author and editor (born 1988)

- Born: January 29, 1988 (age 38); Knoxville, Tennessee, U.S.
- Education: Kenyon College
- Occupations: Writer; editor; creative producer
- Website: racheldeloachewilliams.com

Rachel DeLoache Williams (born January 29, 1988) is an American writer, photographer, and editor. She worked as a photo editor and producer for Vanity Fair from 2010 until 2019. Williams is known for being a former friend of Anna Sorokin, who pretended to be a German heiress and was accused of conning Williams out of $62,000.

Williams reported Sorokin to the authorities, helping law enforcement to locate and arrest Sorokin and later testified against her in court. She wrote an article about her experiences with Sorokin for Vanity Fair and authored the book My Friend Anna, which became a New York Times best seller.

Williams was portrayed by Katie Lowes in the Netflix drama series Inventing Anna, released in February 2022. Williams subsequently filed a lawsuit against Netflix for defamation and false light invasion of privacy. The case was settled out of court in 2026.

== Early life and education ==
Williams is originally from Knoxville, Tennessee, the daughter of two clinical psychologists. She graduated cum laude from Kenyon College in 2010 with double majors in English and studio art. While a student, she interned in New York City for Art + Commerce (a photography agency and production company then owned by IMG), Harper's Bazaar, and Mercedes-Benz Fashion Week.

== Career ==
After graduating from college, Williams began a job in the photo department of Vanity Fair, where she worked for nearly a decade first as an assistant and later as an editor and producer. While at the magazine, Williams helped to produce photoshoots with photographers such as Annie Leibovitz and Mark Seliger of portrait subjects such as Jennifer Lawrence, Emma Stone, Bruce Springsteen, Amy Schumer, Lady Gaga, Katy Perry, Caitlyn Jenner, Rihanna, Patti Smith, and many others. Williams was laid off in February 2019 due to company-wide restructuring. Williams has since worked as a freelance creative producer.

== Friendship with Anna Sorokin ==
=== Background ===
Williams met Anna Sorokin, then known as Anna Delvey, through friends in February 2016. A year later, when Sorokin returned to NYC after time spent abroad, the two became friends. Sorokin invited Williams, along with Kacy Duke and a videographer, to be her guest on a week-long trip to Marrakesh. During the vacation, Sorokin's credit card stopped working and Williams was forced to cover the $62,000 cost of the flights, meals, and La Mamounia hotel stay for all four travelers, with the promise that Sorokin would wire her the money the following week.

Although Sorokin sent Williams $5,000 the following month, she then made promises and excuses for almost half a year – providing Williams with forged wire transfer receipts – and never paid Williams back. Williams borrowed money from friends to cover the cost of living expenses like rent and food as she grappled with the debt left in Sorokin's wake, which amounted to more than Williams's net annual income at the time.

=== Working with law enforcement ===
Williams reported the incident to the New York City Police Department and the New York County District Attorney. In October, 2017, Williams helped law enforcement find and arrest Sorokin in Los Angeles, and later testified against her in court. While Sorokin was found guilty on four counts of theft of services, one count of attempted grand larceny, and three counts of grand larceny, she was not found guilty for stealing from Williams. Although Sorokin's actions toward Williams were not classified as criminal, after the trial concluded and Sorokin was convicted, American Express agreed to protect Williams from the charges incurred at La Mamounia hotel, two full years after the trip to Marrakesh.

=== Aftermath ===
In 2018, Williams published an article for Vanity Fair about her experience with Sorokin. Her story was then optioned by HBO (the option later lapsed and the rights reverted to Williams). In 2019, Williams authored the book My Friend Anna: The True Story of a Fake Heiress, published by Gallery Publishing Group, which went on to become a New York Times best seller.

Williams was interviewed about her experience with Sorokin on Red Table Talk's episode Tinder Swindler and Anna Delvey Victims: What You Haven't Heard. She also spoke with psychologist Ramani Durvasula for Dr. Ramani's podcast Navigating Narcissism.

== Netflix portrayal ==
Without rights or input from Williams, Williams was portrayed by Katie Lowes in the Netflix drama series Inventing Anna, released in February 2022. The series received mixed reviews. Williams's portrayal in the series became the subject of controversy, with many critics pointing to the problematic and unnecessary villainization of Williams as a byproduct of the showmakers' decision to glamorize Sorokin's crimes. In an interview with Rotten Tomatoes, Lowes admitted that she didn't meet the real Rachel before filming, explaining that while she did look at Williams' social media account, "I actually based her on somebody else I know."

"[W]hile the show is unsure of where it stands on Anna Delvey; on capitalism; on the state of new media, one thing is for certain: Inventing Anna really, really wants us to hate Rachel DeLoache Williams, journalist and ex-friend of Sorokin," wrote Annabel Nugent of The Independent. "[The show] seems hellbent on making her out to be the worst person in the world." Hayley Maitland of Vogue noted that the series identified Williams by full name, real employer, real apartment location, and real alma mater but showed major falsehoods about her, including wearing expensive designer clothes given to her by Anna Delvey, even though Delvey never gave her any clothes; being fired for putting the unexpected $62,000 cost of the trip on her company credit card, even though she transferred the full amount to her personal credit card; and admitting at the courthouse right after giving her testimony that the credit card company had forgiven the debt, even though that did not happen until after the trial was over. Maitland also faults the series for demonizing Williams for doing essentially the same thing a sympathetic character does and points out that Williams is the victim most injured by Sorokin.

=== Response and lawsuit ===
In an interview with Vanity Fair, Williams called the series a dangerous distortion, pointing out that the title card that appears at the beginning of each episode, reading: This story is completely true, except for all the parts that aren't, "gives the show enough credibility so that people can believe [the fictional elements] more easily." Williams suggests, "it's worth exploring at what point a half-truth is more dangerous than a lie." Williams further argues, in an essay for Air Mail that "[for Sorokin] and Netflix alike, attention is stock-in-trade. Consider that whatever scruples audiences may have with Inventing Anna, whether they celebrate or scrutinize its dubious depictions, any controversy that ensues is sure to attract an even wider audience," she writes. "Take it from someone who knows: This is the art of the con, a shell game that proffers irresistible thrills for low stakes, while a sleight of hand carries out the high-roller business unseen. Netflix isn't just putting out a fictional story. It's effectively running a con woman's P.R.—and putting money in her pocket."

In August 2022, Williams filed a lawsuit against Netflix for defamation and false light invasion of privacy. As reported by The Hollywood Reporter, Alexander Rufus-Isaacs, representing Williams, says the lawsuit makes a strong case that his client's character was intentionally misrepresented to tell a better story. He points to an interview from Shonda Rhimes, the executive producer and creator of the series. "We wanted to know what we were making up," Rhimes said in the interview. "We didn't want to be making things up just for the sake of it." She added, "We wanted to intentionally be fictionalizing moments versus just accidentally be fictionalizing them." In another interview with The Hollywood Reporter, Rhimes said, "There was stuff that we invented because it needed to be invented to make the story really sing and be what it should be."

Katie Lowes, who played Williams in the series, also said during an interview that, "[The Rachel character is] a people pleaser. She's young, naïve, and had a privileged life. I don't think this is necessarily true of Rachel Williams in real life; I think this is true of the character Shonda wrote and what Shonda needed the character to be for the show."

The case was settled out of court in 2026.
