= Hustlers (film) =

2019 film by Lorene Scafaria

- Theatrical release poster
- Directed by: Lorene Scafaria
- Screenplay by: Lorene Scafaria
- Based on: "The Hustlers at Scores" by Jessica Pressler
- Produced by: Jessica Elbaum; Will Ferrell; Adam McKay; Elaine Goldsmith-Thomas; Jennifer Lopez; Benny Medina
- Starring: Constance Wu; Jennifer Lopez; Julia Stiles; Keke Palmer; Lili Reinhart; Lizzo; Cardi B
- Cinematography: Todd Banhazl
- Edited by: Kayla Emter
- Production companies: Gloria Sanchez Productions; Nuyorican Productions; Annapurna Pictures
- Distributed by: STXfilms
- Release dates: September 7, 2019 (TIFF); September 13, 2019 (United States)
- Running time: 110 minutes
- Country: United States
- Language: English
- Budget: $20 million
- Box office: $157 million

Hustlers is a 2019 American crime comedy-drama film written and directed by Lorene Scafaria, based on New York magazine's 2015 article "The Hustlers at Scores" by Jessica Pressler. The film stars Constance Wu, Jennifer Lopez, Julia Stiles, Lili Reinhart and Keke Palmer, along with Lizzo and Cardi B in their first film appearances. It follows a crew of New York City strippers who begin to steal money by drugging stock traders and CEOs who visit their club, then running up their credit cards. Lopez also served as a producer on the film through Nuyorican Productions, alongside Jessica Elbaum, Will Ferrell, and Adam McKay through their Gloria Sanchez banner.

First announced in February 2016, the film was originally set to be financed and distributed by Annapurna Pictures. However, amid financial trouble, Annapurna dropped the rights in October 2018. After STX Entertainment picked them up, much of the cast joined that fall through the following spring, and filming took place in New York City from March to May 2019.

Hustlers had its world premiere on September 7, 2019, at the Toronto International Film Festival, and was theatrically released in the United States on September 13, 2019. The film received positive reviews from critics, with particular praise for Lopez's performance, for which she received nominations at the Golden Globe, Critics Choice and Screen Actors Guild award ceremonies. It grossed $157.6 million worldwide against a production budget of $20.7 million.

== Plot ==
In 2014, former New York City-based stripper Dorothy is invited for an interview with Elizabeth, a journalist working on a story involving Dorothy's former friend and mentor, Ramona Vega.

Seven years prior, Dorothy, known by her stripper name as Destiny, is working at Moves, a strip club, to support her grandmother, but is barely getting by. Mesmerized by Ramona's performance and the tips she earns, Destiny meets her on the roof of the club. Ramona agrees to take Destiny under her wing, and the two form a formidable team. Destiny enjoys newfound wealth and friendship with Ramona. A year later, during the 2008 financial crisis, both women find themselves short of cash. Destiny becomes pregnant. She kicks her boyfriend out of the house shortly after their daughter's birth, and she is unable to find a new job.

With no other options, Destiny moves back into her grandmother's place with her daughter. Moves has changed: the crisis has impacted their business, and the club is primarily staffed by immigrant women willing to perform sex acts for money, a line Destiny is unwilling to cross, but she does in a moment of desperation. She reconnects with Ramona, who introduces her to a new scheme. Along with her two protégées, Mercedes and Annabelle, Ramona targets rich men at bars, gets them drunk, and then escorts them to Moves where the girls steal their credit card numbers and charge them to their limit. Destiny joins in, and learns that Ramona uses a mix of ketamine and MDMA to impair judgment and cause memory loss in their targets, a tactic deemed worthwhile since their victims will rarely admit to being robbed by strippers.

The scheme works, and the women enjoy their new source of wealth. When some of the targets prove too aggressive for Mercedes and Annabelle to handle, Destiny suggests bringing in other girls, who are carefully trained to avoid drinking or using drugs. Ramona's partnership with Moves makes the credit card fraud lucrative for them. However, cracks start to show in their operation. Other strippers begin to emulate their strategies. Furious, Ramona cuts her business ties with Moves, and the group begins to service clients in hotel rooms or their own homes. Mercedes and Annabelle become increasingly unreliable with this new practice, so Ramona hires women with drug problems and criminal records to replace them, while Destiny balks at bringing in "junkies and criminals". Destiny's fears prove true when a client suffers a near-fatal accident and she must take him to the hospital. Meanwhile, Ramona is busy bailing out a particularly unreliable new hire, Dawn. Destiny returns home to find her grandmother has died. At the funeral, Ramona makes amends and promises to take care of Destiny from now on.

Back in 2014, Destiny becomes uncomfortable and stops the interview when Elizabeth insists on talking about Ramona. When Elizabeth returns home, Destiny calls and agrees to finish their conversation, recalling how her friendship with Ramona – and their crime ring – fell apart. Ramona's callousness drives a wedge between the women, and Destiny feels she can no longer justify her crimes. Dawn is picked up by the police and "flips" on her partners, while investigators manage to locate several victims and identify all of the girls. Destiny, Ramona, Annabelle, and Mercedes are arrested, but only Destiny (thinking of her daughter) takes a plea deal. Ramona is sentenced to five years probation, while the others serve short jail sentences before being released on probation.

A year later, Elizabeth visits Ramona, who is now working a retail job. Ramona reveals a childhood photo of Destiny that she keeps along with her most valued possessions. The article is published, and Elizabeth encourages Destiny to reach out to Ramona and make amends.

== Cast ==
- Constance Wu as Destiny (real name Dorothy), a stripper
- Jennifer Lopez as Ramona Vega, a veteran stripper and a lap dancer
- Julia Stiles as Elizabeth, a journalist
- Keke Palmer as Mercedes, a stripper
- Lili Reinhart as Annabelle, a stripper and a sex worker
- Mercedes Ruehl as Mama, the club's den mother
- Cardi B as Diamond, a stripper
- Lizzo as Liz, a stripper
- Mette Towley as Justice
- Madeline Brewer as Dawn
- Trace Lysette as Tracey, a prostitute and provider of erotic massage
- Wai Ching Ho as Destiny's grandmother
- Gerald Gillum as Johnny, Destiny's ex-boyfriend and the father of her daughter
- Frank Whaley as Reese, Ramona's rich client
- Paul Nielsen as Detective Hunter
- Brandon Keener as Alpha
- Steven Boyer as Doug (note: film producers changed name to protect identity of real life case victim Zyad Younan)
- Jon Glaser as Mark
- Devin Ratray as Stephen
- Rhys Coiro as Spencer
- Jovanni Ortiz as Joe, one of Ramona's clients
- Big Jay Oakerson as DJ, the club's DJ
- Usher as himself
- Kersti Bryan as Amy, Destiny's neighbor
- Zac Jaffee as Gary

== Production ==
=== Development ===
In February 2016, it was announced that Jessica Elbaum, Will Ferrell and Adam McKay would produce Hustlers, under their Gloria Sanchez Productions banner. The film was also produced by Elaine Goldsmith-Thomas, and Jennifer Lopez through Nuyorican Productions. In May 2016, Annapurna Pictures was announced to co-produce and finance the film, with the studio's Megan Ellison and Chelsea Barnard serving as executive producers. In October 2018, it was announced Annapurna had dropped the film, with STX Entertainment acquiring distribution rights to the film. Annapurna allegedly dropped the film due to budget concerns.

Hustlers was directed by Lorene Scafaria from a screenplay she wrote. Upon first receiving Scafaria's script, Gloria Sanchez Productions first had Martin Scorsese in mind to direct, while also considering Adam McKay. Producer Jessica Elbaum stated that their initial approach was to "send this to the people that we've seen make this type of movie." After Scorsese and other directors passed on the project, producers ultimately gave Scafaria, who had refused to take on other directorial projects in hopes of directing Hustlers, the green-light to direct. Scafaria convinced the producers to hire her as director with a two-minute sizzle reel she created to demonstrate her concept. Scafaria described the "judgment that people have about strippers" as a challenge in getting the film made. According to producer Elaine Goldsmith-Thomas, who was pitching Hustlers to a range of studios after Annapurna dropped it, "[the male studio executives] were a little uncomfortable. Everybody could see the commercial value of this movie, but they were like, 'Can they just drug the bad guys? Can they just do it to the people that deserve it?'"

=== Casting ===
After being chosen to direct, Scafaria spent two years casting for Hustlers. In August 2018, it was announced that Jennifer Lopez would star in the film. Lopez was Scafaria's first choice to play Ramona, stating: "as soon as I was done, I realized, Oh my God, Ramona is Jennifer Lopez [...] It has to be her." Lopez, who plays a veteran stripper in the film, began pole dance training with professional dancer and choreographer Johanna Sapakie two and a half months before filming in preparation for a scene that has Lopez performing a major solo pole dance routine without a professional stand-in. Constance Wu joined the cast in October, after putting herself on tape, noting: "I knew that my résumé at that point didn't really have anything that would indicate that I could pull off this role." In March 2019, Cardi B, Lili Reinhart, Keke Palmer, Julia Stiles, and Mercedes Ruehl joined the cast with Mette Towley and Trace Lysette in negotiations to join as well. That same month, Madeline Brewer and Frank Whaley joined the cast of the film. Lizzo joined the cast of the film in April 2019, and Usher joined the cast in May. Scafaria had the idea to cast Cardi B, a former stripper, in the film, prompting Lopez to convince her to join the project. Lopez said: "I know she knew this world better than any of us. I told her she had to do it. And I wasn't going to take no for an answer."

=== Filming and design ===
Principal photography for Hustlers began on March 22, 2019, in New York City, with the shoot lasting 29 days. Production wrapped on May 3. Scenes were also shot north of the city in New Rochelle, White Plains and at the Palisades Center. According to producer Elaine Goldsmith-Thomas, the production budget for the film was $20.7 million. Cameos by Usher, Lizzo, and Cardi B, were all filmed the same day.

Hustlers costume designer, Mitchell Travers, defined the origins of the film's costumes and treatment in an interview with Vanity Fair, stating that "I knew it [had] to absolutely floor the audience, and let them know that this is not going to be like any movie that they've seen before." Travers designed the costumes for Lopez to showcase the strength and muscle tone she amassed during her pre-Hustlers training. Without running afoul of the film's planned R rating, he dreamed up the diamond bodysuit that was essentially connected by three straps. Travers commented: "We did a lot of research and development to find something that could [stretch in every direction during Lopez's dance]. It's performance wear, and really had to work for that sequence. We did a number of fittings on it. It is tailored within an inch of its life, completely custom for her."

=== Music ===
The soundtrack to Hustlers features a list of songs ranging from late 1990s R&B, dance music, indie pop, to classical interludes, including Janet Jackson, Fiona Apple, Britney Spears, Lorde, Scott Walker and Frédéric Chopin. As Scafaria explained: "I thought of [the film] as a musical — the songs themselves were telling a story. Most of the music choices were also written into the script, I had obviously imagined scenes to these songs, and we shot to these songs, but you never know if you're going to get the rights." The film's music supervisor, Jason Markey, got artists from Big Sean to Bob Seger to sign-off permission to include their songs in the Hustlers soundtrack; however, the film deliberately does not feature any songs from the catalogs of Jennifer Lopez, Lizzo, or Cardi B. Markey noted that, "We didn't have a score, either; every song made a statement about the scene."

== Release ==
The teaser trailer for Hustlers premiered online on July 17, 2019. The full theatrical trailer premiered online on September 3, 2019.

Hustlers held its world premiere at the Toronto International Film Festival on September 7, 2019. It was theatrically released in the United States on September 13, 2019, which was on Reinhart's birthday. The studio spent around $38 million on promotions and advertisement.

=== Censorship ===
The film was banned outright from release in Malaysia, and has received censorship in several Asian countries. The film was denied a clearance certificate by the Malaysian Film Censorship Board, for showing what officials called "excessive obscene content".

== Reception ==
=== Box office ===
Hustlers grossed $105 million in the United States and Canada, and $52.6 million in other territories, for a worldwide total of $157.6 million. Deadline Hollywood calculated the net profit of the film to be $47 million, when factoring together all expenses and revenues.

In the United States and Canada, the film was released alongside The Goldfinch, and was projected to gross $25–30 million from 3,250 theaters in its opening weekend. The film made $13.1 million on its first day, including $2.5 million in Thursday night previews. It was the biggest single day gross in STX Entertainment's history. The film went on to debut to $33.2 million, finishing second, behind holdover It Chapter Two; the opening marked the most successful in STX's history and the best of Lopez's live-action career. The audience breakdown of the opening weekend was 67% female, including 69% being over the age of 25. It dropped 49% in its second weekend to $16.8 million, finishing in fifth, and made $11.5 million in its third weekend, jumping to third.

=== Critical response ===
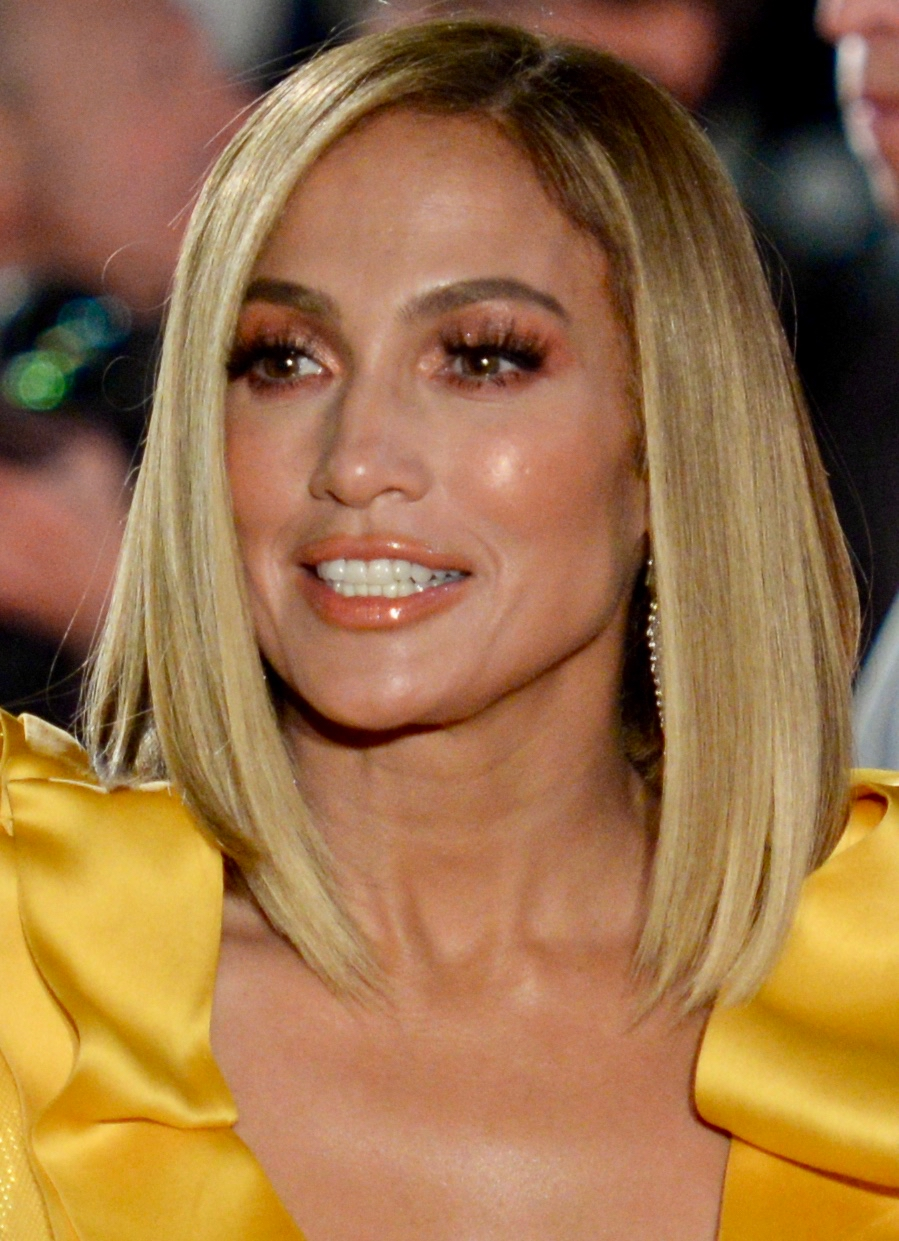
Jennifer Lopez's performance as Ramona Vega was acclaimed by critics, with some deeming it the finest of her acting career.

On Rotten Tomatoes, the film holds an approval rating of 88% based on 358 reviews, with an average rating of 7.3/10. The site's critical consensus reads, "Led by a career-best performance from Jennifer Lopez, Hustlers is a uniquely empowering heist drama with depth and intelligence to match its striking visual appeal." On Metacritic, the film has a weighted average score of 79 out of 100, based on 44 critics, indicating "generally favorable" reviews. Audiences polled by CinemaScore gave the film an average grade of "B−" on an A+ to F scale, and those at PostTrak gave it an average 3.5 out of 5 stars and a 50% "definite recommend". The film was also chosen by Time magazine, HuffPost, and NPR as one of the best films of 2019.

Christy Lemire rated the film 3 stars, describing Hustlers as "Goodfellas in a G-string... Scafaria's film is always a blast to watch, resulting in a surprising level of emotional depth." Lemire also described it as "Lopez's best screen work since her early heyday of Selena and Out of Sight..." and a "...career-best performance." Kate Erbland of IndieWire rated Hustlers an A− and describes the film as "funny, empowering, sexy, emotional, and a bit scary. The Oscar chatter for Lopez's revelatory, nuanced, and emotional turn as a brilliant con artist and better exotic dancer is no joke." Variety's Peter DeBruge writes, "flashy, fleshy and all-around impossible to ignore, Hustlers amounts to nothing less than a cultural moment, inspired by an outrageous New York Magazine profile... adapted by writer-director Scafaria at her most Scorsese, and starring Jennifer Lopez like you've never seen her before."

Justin Chang, writing for the Los Angeles Times, describes the film as "brassy and invigorating" stating that "Scafaria's clear-eyed grasp of that distinction that makes Hustlers more than just a girls-gone-wild cautionary tale, a peekaboo parade or a hypocritical amalgam of the two. The movie's empathy for its leads and its wholly justified rage against the architects of financial collapse is held in check by the knowledge that every hustle has its collateral damage." The Guardian's Benjamin Lee, rated the film 4 out of 5 stars, stating that "even when films have focused on strippers as something other than window dressing, they've still been written and directed by men and have smoothed over rougher edges, turning them all into titillating one-note archetypes. Instead, Scafaria views the strip club like any other workplace, filled with internal politics and an ever-changing hierarchy of power." Beandrea July of The Hollywood Reporter stated that "Hustlers delivers on its hype while consistently doing the unexpected. Scafaria, whose last pic was the Susan Sarandon vehicle The Meddler (2015), excels at immersing the audience in the world of sex-work in clubs, quietly disabusing us scene by scene of any stereotypes about who these women are."

Emily VanDerWerff of Vox writes "as you're distracted by all that razzle-dazzle and the movie's many, many great jokes, Hustlers is quietly composing some deeply profound thoughts about the relationships women build with each other." Brennan Carley of GQ called Hustlers the best movie of 2019 to date, noting: "starting with a bang is one thing, though; maintaining that energy throughout its entire run-time is what makes this strippers-turned-criminals flick such a masterful feat." Rolling Stone's film critic Peter Travers was also positive, stating that, "Hustlers doesn't pussyfoot about what goes on in those 'champagne rooms' off stage. The intent is not to exploit but to show how women manage to live and work in a predatory man's world", adding that "in Scafaria's fiercely funny provocation of a film—there's no running from the shadows—it's the women who seize control."

== Accolades ==
IndieWire's annual TIFF Critics Survey of the 2019 best films and performances at the festival ranked Lopez's performance the best female performance as well as the fourth best performance among movies premiered at TIFF. On Time's annual best performances of the year list, Stephanie Zacharek ranked Lopez as the second-best film performance of 2019. Also, A. O. Scott from The New York Times ranked Lopez as one of the 10 Best Actors of 2019. IndieWire included both Lopez and Wu on its annual ranking of the 20 best film performances by actresses.

Organization / Ceremony	Date of ceremony	Category	Recipient(s)	Result	Ref.
Toronto International Film Festival	September 7, 2019	Creative Coalition's Spotlight Initiative Award	Keke Palmer	Won	
Rome Film Festival	October 27, 2019	BNL People's Choice Award	Hustlers	Nominated	
Gotham Awards	December 2, 2019	Best Feature	Hustlers	Nominated	
National Film & TV Awards	December 3, 2019	Best Actress	Jennifer Lopez	Won	
New York Film Critics Online	December 7, 2019	Top 10 Films	Hustlers	Won	
Washington D.C. Area Film Critics Association	December 8, 2019	Best Supporting Actress	Jennifer Lopez	Won	
Women Film Critics Circle	December 9, 2019	Best Movie About Women	Hustlers	Nominated	
Women Film Critics Circle	December 9, 2019	Best Movie by a Woman	Hustlers	Nominated	
Women Film Critics Circle	December 9, 2019	Best Screen Couple	Jennifer Lopez & Constance Wu	Runner-up	
Women Film Critics Circle	December 9, 2019	Adrienne Shelly Award	Hustlers	Runner-up	
Chicago Film Critics Association	December 14, 2019	Best Adapted Screenplay	Lorene Scafaria	Nominated	
Chicago Film Critics Association	December 14, 2019	Best Supporting Actress	Jennifer Lopez	Nominated	
San Francisco Bay Area Film Critics Circle	December 16, 2019	Best Adapted Screenplay	Lorene Scafaria	Nominated	
San Francisco Bay Area Film Critics Circle	December 16, 2019	Best Supporting Actress	Jennifer Lopez	Won	
Seattle Film Critics Society	December 16, 2019	Best Supporting Actress	Jennifer Lopez	Won	
Vancouver Film Critics Circle	December 16, 2019	Best Supporting Actress	Jennifer Lopez	Nominated	
Dallas–Fort Worth Film Critics Association	December 16, 2019	Best Supporting Actress	Jennifer Lopez	Runner-up	
IndieWire Critics' Poll	December 16, 2019	Best Supporting Actress	Jennifer Lopez	Runner-up	
IndieWire Critics' Poll	December 16, 2019	Best Screenplay	Lorene Scafaria	19th place	
Dublin Film Critics' Circle	December 17, 2019	Best Film	Hustlers (tie with High Life)	8th place	
Dublin Film Critics' Circle	December 17, 2019	Best Actress	Jennifer Lopez	9th place	
Dublin Film Critics' Circle	December 17, 2019	Best Director	Lorene Scafaria	9th place	
Dublin Film Critics' Circle	December 17, 2019	Best Screenplay	Lorene Scafaria	10th place	
Satellite Awards	December 19, 2019	Best Motion Picture, Comedy or Musical	Hustlers	Nominated	
Satellite Awards	December 19, 2019	Best Actress in Motion Picture, Comedy or Musical	Constance Wu	Nominated	
Satellite Awards	December 19, 2019	Best Supporting Actress – Motion Picture	Jennifer Lopez	Won	
Florida Film Critics Circle	December 23, 2019	Best Supporting Actress	Jennifer Lopez	Nominated	
Palm Springs International Film Festival Gala	January 2, 2020	Spotlight Award	Jennifer Lopez	Won	
National Society of Film Critics	January 4, 2020	Best Supporting Actress	Jennifer Lopez	Runner-up	
Golden Globe Awards	January 5, 2020	Best Supporting Actress – Motion Picture	Jennifer Lopez	Nominated	
Online Film Critics Society	January 6, 2020	Best Adapted Screenplay	Lorene Scafaria	Nominated	
Online Film Critics Society	January 6, 2020	Best Supporting Actress	Jennifer Lopez	Won	
Austin Film Critics Association	January 6, 2020	Best Supporting Actress	Jennifer Lopez	Won	
Austin Film Critics Association	January 6, 2020	Best Adapted Screenplay	Lorene Scafaria	Nominated	
The Society of LGBTQ Entertainment Critics	January 8, 2020	Film of the Year	Hustlers	Nominated	
The Society of LGBTQ Entertainment Critics	January 8, 2020	Supporting Film Performance of the Year — Actress	Jennifer Lopez	Won	
Hollywood Critics Association	January 9, 2020	Best Adapted Screenplay	Lorene Scafaria	Nominated	
Hollywood Critics Association	January 9, 2020	Best Female Director	Lorene Scafaria	Nominated	
Hollywood Critics Association	January 9, 2020	Best Supporting Actress	Jennifer Lopez	Won	
Georgia Film Critics Association	January 10, 2020	Best Supporting Actress	Jennifer Lopez	Nominated	
Georgia Film Critics Association	January 10, 2020	Best Adapted Screenplay	Lorene Scafaria	Nominated	
Alliance of Women Film Journalists	January 10, 2020	Best Adapted Screenplay	Lorene Scafaria	Nominated	
Alliance of Women Film Journalists	January 10, 2020	Best Actress in a Supporting Role	Jennifer Lopez	Nominated	
Alliance of Women Film Journalists	January 10, 2020	Best Woman Screenwriter	Lorene Scafaria	Nominated	
Alliance of Women Film Journalists	January 10, 2020	Most Daring Performance	Jennifer Lopez	Nominated	
Make-Up Artists and Hair Stylists Guild	January 11, 2020	Feature-Length Motion Picture - Best Contemporary Make-Up	Margot Boccia, Roxanne Rizzo	Nominated	
Make-Up Artists and Hair Stylists Guild	January 11, 2020	Feature-Length Motion Picture - Best Contemporary Hair Styling	Angel De Angelis, Dierdre Harris	Nominated	
AARP The Magazine's Annual Movies for Grownups Awards	January 11, 2020	Best Supporting Actress	Jennifer Lopez	Nominated	
Broadcast Film Critics Association	January 12, 2020	Best Supporting Actress	Jennifer Lopez	Nominated	
Screen Actors Guild Awards	January 19, 2020	Outstanding Performance by a Female Actor in a Supporting Role	Jennifer Lopez	Nominated	
Los Angeles Film Critics Association	January 2020	Best Supporting Actress	Jennifer Lopez	Won	
Costume Designers Guild	January 28, 2020	Excellence in Contemporary Film	Mitchell Travers	Nominated	
London Film Critics' Circle	January 30, 2020	Supporting Actress of the Year	Jennifer Lopez	Nominated	
Casting Society of America	January 30, 2020	Excellence in Casting - Comedy	Gayle Keller	Nominated	
Black Reel Awards	February 6, 2020	Outstanding Costume Design	Mitchell Travers	Nominated	
Independent Spirit Awards	February 8, 2020	Best Director	Lorene Scafaria	Nominated	
Independent Spirit Awards	February 8, 2020	Best Supporting Female	Jennifer Lopez	Nominated	
Independent Spirit Awards	February 8, 2020	Best Cinematography	Todd Banhazl	Nominated	
NAACP Image Awards	February 22, 2020	Outstanding Supporting Actress in a Motion Picture	Jennifer Lopez	Nominated	
Golden Raspberry Awards	March 16, 2020	Razzie Redeemer Award	Jennifer Lopez	Nominated	

== See also ==
- Roselyn Keo
- Samantha Barbash
