= Jessica Pressler =

American journalist (born 1977/1978)

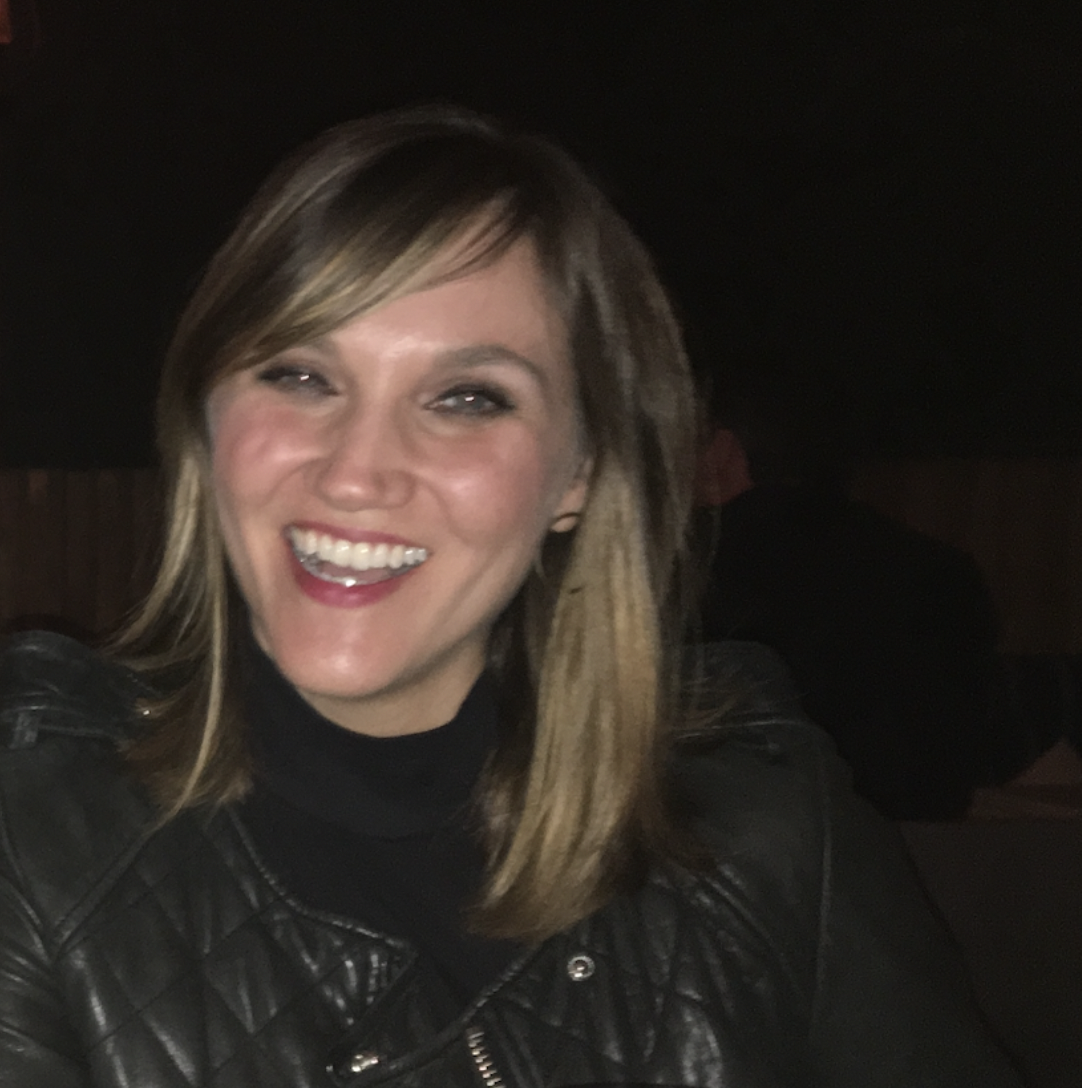
- Pressler in 2017
- Born: 1977 or 1978 (age 48–49); Marblehead, Massachusetts, U.S.
- Education: Temple University
- Occupations: Journalist, magazine writer
- Spouses: Benjamin Wallace (m. 2008; div. 2011) Josh Uhl (m. 2011)
- Website: jessicapressler.com

Jessica Pressler (born 1977/78) is an American journalist and contributing editor at New York. Her 2015 article "The Hustlers at Scores" was nominated for a National Magazine Award and was later made into a feature film called Hustlers in 2019. She also wrote a story about Anna Sorokin that was later developed into the mini-series Inventing Anna released by Netflix in 2022.

== Early life ==
Her mother, Judith Pressler, was a guidance counselor at Swampscott High School and her father, Michael Pressler, was a professor of English and the director of the interdisciplinary arts program at Shippensburg University of Pennsylvania.

== Career ==
Pressler became the co-editor of New York magazine's Daily Intel blog in 2007 after working as a staff writer at Philadelphia magazine and as a freelancer for celebrity magazines. At New York, she has written extensively on "the culture of wealth and money," interviewing Wall Street CEOs such as Goldman Sachs's Lloyd Blankfein and AIG's Bob Benmosche about their firms' involvement in the 2008 financial crisis. Pressler has profiled New York personalities Lynn Tilton and Anthony Scaramucci. Her feature articles about the feud between J. Christopher Burch and Tory Burch and the culture of Silicon Valley startups have appeared in The Best Business Writing.

In 2014, Pressler wrote a story about a Stuyvesant High School senior who had allegedly made $72 million trading stocks, which was later revealed to be false. Bloomberg News rescinded a job offer made to her for their investigative unit after the student confessed he had "made the whole thing up."

On December 28, 2015, Pressler published an article for New York called "The Hustlers at Scores", a story about strippers who manipulated money out of their clients. She was nominated for a National Magazine Award in 2016. A team of producers that included Will Ferrell "snapped up" the film rights in February 2016. The story was adapted into a film by Gloria Sanchez Productions titled Hustlers; it was released in 2019 and stars Keke Palmer, Constance Wu and Jennifer Lopez, with Julia Stiles portraying "Elizabeth", a fictionalized version of Pressler.

In 2018, she wrote a story about New York City high society grifter Anna Sorokin, which was developed into the mini-series Inventing Anna by Netflix and Shonda Rhimes. Pressler's book, Bad Influence: Money, Lies, Power, and the World that Created Anna Delvey, was scheduled for publication in 2022, but as of 2026 has yet to have a release date.

Pressler has also written for GQ, Elle, Esquire and Smithsonian. She was a regular Gossip Girl episode recap writer online for Vulture, and later made a cameo appearance as a New York editor in one of its episodes.

== Personal life ==
In 2008, she married Benjamin Wallace, a freelance magazine writer and author. They later divorced, and she is now married to Josh Uhl.

== Select articles ==
- "What Does It Take for a Female Tycoon to Get Noticed Around Here" (April 8, 2011) for New York
- "His. Hers." (February 12, 2012) for New York
- "AIG CEO Bob Benmosche Resigns, for Real This Time" (June 10, 2014) for Intelligencer
- "Because a Stuyvesant Senior Made Millions Picking Stocks. His Hedge Fund Opens As Soon As He Turns 18." (December 14, 2014) for New York
- "The Hustlers at Scores" (December 28, 2015) for New York
- "Long on Trump" (January 23, 2017) for New York
- "Gossip Girl Forever" (September 22, 2017) for Vulture
- "Maybe She Had So Much Money She Just Lost Track of It" (May 28, 2018) for New York

=== Interviews ===
- Michael Lewis: "They Should Have Broken Up the Banks" (Dec 1, 2015) in Vulture
