= List of Dead Like Me characters =

This is a list of the characters from the Showtime comedy-drama series Dead Like Me.

== George Lass ==
Georgia L. "George" Lass (Ellen Muth) (1985–2003) is the youngest Reaper (both physically and chronologically) in the club. She is the protagonist of the series, and also performs the function of narrator. As a child, she is portrayed by Talia Ranger.

George was born in 1985 and raised at Beatrice Lane (in the Seattle metropolitan area) by her parents, Joy and Clancy Lass. When George was a young child, she had a very close relationship with her father. Every Sunday morning she and Clancy would eat breakfast at a local diner. However, as she grew older, George distanced herself from both her parents, becoming increasingly insolent and obstinate. The birth of her little sister, Reggie, caused George to feel neglected, creating a rift between her and Joy. George's habit of ignoring Reggie lasted until her death.

At least twice in her childhood George was shown to be able to see Gravelings. In the first instance she was pushed into a public swimming pool by another girl who wanted to impress a mean clique. Two Gravelings had removed a grate at the bottom of the pool, toward which George was sinking, but one of the Gravelings appeared to argue with the other about something, and they retreated, allowing George to be rescued by lifeguards. The second instance was on a Halloween, when George confronted a serial killer about why he did not hand out candy in the traditional way (instead leaving a dish full on his steps). When looking into his house, George saw a Graveling behind the man.

According to her mother, George's maturity level and intellect quickly outpaced that of her friends, leaving her alone throughout high school. George repeatedly mentions that she had no boyfriends and partook in no sexual activities in her lifetime, blatantly ignoring men who flirted with her.

George began college but only lasted to midterm, after which she dropped out and sought a job from Happy Time Temporary Services. Delores Herbig purposefully found George the least pleasant job she could find after George insulted her authority and seniority.

On June 27, 2003 (at the age of 18) during the lunch break of her first day of work, George was struck by a zero-G toilet seat dislodged from the de-orbiting Soviet space station Mir, and killed.

Before her death, George characterizes herself as uninterested in everything, in order to ward off disappointment; by her understanding, interest led to expectations, which then led to disappointment once those expectations were cut short.

After George is killed, she is met by Rube Sofer and Betty Rohmer (her own Reaper having disappeared). Unlike many of her future "reaps", George suffers from mild hysteria upon realizing she is dead. Since she is here to stay, Rube breaks many guidelines associated with reaping, taking her to her autopsy and allowing her to attend her own funeral. Once her corpse (or what is left of it) is properly interred, she becomes officially undead ("Un-George") and gains a new physical body and different appearance to all non-Reapers (portrayed by Laura Boddington in the TV series, and Jennifer Rae Westley in the later film). More than anything else, seeing her new appearance "freaks" her out the most.

George assumes the name Mildred "Millie" Hagen and seeks employment from Happy Time once again. Since her appearance has changed to facilitate her reaping, she has a fresh start and this time impresses Delores, who hires her to work at Happy Time itself.

In a deleted scene on the DVD, it is shown how an entire industry staffed by reapers has arisen to create new identities for newly assigned undead. She is provided with all necessary documentation to prove she is Mildred Hagen.

Millie soon becomes one of Delores's friends and (arguably) most favorite employees. In order to make her reaping appointments, she frequently uses the excuses of Alcoholics Anonymous meetings, drug rehabilitation, and gynecology appointments, all of which unintentionally further Delores's sympathy for her.

George begins to form a friendship with the aloof Betty, but the relationship is cut short by Betty's departure. She keeps track of her old family's life, sometimes driving by, placing silent calls, or leaving things on their doorstep. Nonetheless, Rube very solidly takes on the role of "the paternal one" (as George puts it). In addition, Delores takes on many of the responsibilities of a mother, Mason grows increasingly closer as a sort of brother, and Daisy becomes George's closest thing to a best friend.

In the tradition of the Reapers, George's new home – a small one-bedroom apartment – is that of one of her reaps. When Daisy arrives however it is too small, and Mason soon swaps his much larger house for theirs. In addition, George gains a pet frog (Mr. Blinky) and a red Mustang convertible from her reaps.

After falling for Trip Hesburgh, reaping his father and crashing the funeral, George has sex with Trip, thereby losing her virginity. She feels conflicted by the experience, and soon afterwards discovers that Trip has abandoned her.

When the Ray Summers Graveling begins threatening Daisy and Mason, George catches him and reaps his soul, which results in his disintegration.

George enjoys coffee, chocolate milkshakes, waffles, and oatmeal with raisins. Unlike the other Reapers (who have been dead for decades), she still has qualms with her fate as one of the undead.

Five years after her "death", George is still reaping souls while working at Happy Time under her "living" name Millie Hagen. Her de facto mentor, Rube, has moved to the Great Beyond after "getting his lights" (a term among reapers where the deceased see an image of a setting that appeals to them before they move on to the afterlife). Shortly after, she encounters her sister Reggie and reveals her identity to her, but later remembers Rube's advice and realizes that this connection to the past is not going well. After talking Reggie out of killing herself, George admits that Rube was right all along. She says goodbye to Reggie, presumably for the last time, as Joy and Reggie have both showed interest in relocating. After Rube's replacement is disposed of by incineration, due to his underhanded and potentially dangerous methods, it is implied that George, to her surprise and dismay, is awarded the task of head reaper.

== Rube Sofer ==
Rube John Sofer (Mandy Patinkin) is the leader of the club. He is laid-back and unemotional, but easily takes offense at interruptions into his daily routine (such as problems with Mason or poorly cooked meals). From the very first time he met George, Rube referred to her as "peanut", the nickname he called his daughter Rosie Sofer. As seen on an envelope, Rube's last name was originally "Stofer" but this was later changed to "Sofer".

=== Ante mortem ===
Rube was born, of Jewish descent, in or about 1875 and lived in Englewood, New Jersey. By his wife Lucy Sonia Sofer (née Debrowski), who was twenty-five years his junior, he had one child, Rose Anne. Though details of Rube's past are scant, a records clerk who is assisting him in finding his daughter comes across a "Wanted" poster of Rube stating that he is a bank robber; it is probable that this led to his death. Frequent references suggest that leaving his family is an act Rube has regretted ever since.

In one flashback, Rube is shown readying a pistol and accidentally awakening his daughter. After quickly hiding the pistol in a newspaper, he approaches Rose's bedside and tells her that he is going to get something that her mother needed. Upon asking her father when he would return, Rube replied, "Soon," and sang her a lullaby to help her go back to sleep.

In the 21st century, Rube goes to the dead letter department at the post office to pick up an eighty-year-old returned letter. This letter was addressed to Rose Sofer and contained a large stack of aged hundred-dollar and fifty-dollar bills. The source of the money is not shown, but it may be related to the robbery. Rube states that he mailed the package after he died.

=== Post mortem ===
Rube is the "foreman" of the group of grim reapers at the center of the series. He gets the list of who is to die, when and where, from an unnamed shadowy individual and then transfers the first initial and last name of the person, where they are to die, and their estimated time of death (ETD) to a Post-it note and assigns them to the Reapers. He enjoys eating and cooking.

Although he comes off as gruff and aloof, he actually cares for his team like a father, and is particularly fond of George Lass, the newest "recruit" to his small team of Reapers.

He claims to have reaped Amelia Earhart. Rube gets irritated at fellow Reaper Mason's antics and frequently calls him a "fuck-up." However, he suspects that Mason is smarter than he seems. A skilled shell game operator, Rube once taught Mason techniques from the game, which he used to sell a line of kitchen appliances. The disappearance of Betty Rohmer, a Reaper with whom he worked since her own death in 1926, disturbed him greatly. He hates computer keyboards, claiming they are too fragile as compared to typewriters, and avoids using them, and by extension computers, whenever possible.

One of the more mysterious of the Reapers featured on Dead Like Me, his full name was not revealed until the episode "Death Defying". His date of death was never made explicit, but implied to be the earliest of the known reapers, save recurring ex-colleague Penny. Mason jokes in "Rites of Passage", "Rube's so fucking old, he reaped Jesus." In "Ghost Story" George thinks Rube probably reaped Houdini, even though in that episode Rube indicates he believes the stage name is one word, "Houdini" rather than "Harry Houdini".

In a major character arc during the second season, he was greatly upset when he discovered that a package of money that he had sent after his death to his daughter and wife in 1927 was never delivered, and embarked upon a quest to find out why. While he searched public record archives, during which he found the death certificate for his wife, he discovered a wanted poster that indicated he was a bank robber. His daughter's birth certificate describes his wife as being of Czechoslovak origin and 24 years old at the time of his daughter's birth, maiden name being Lucy Sonia Debrowski. Rube's full name is revealed here, as well as his stated occupation of salesman and that he was 49 years old at her birth. His daughter's full name is Rose Anne Sofer. Their address was 243 Georgian Lane. Lucy's death certificate was discovered but not shown, but her gravestone shows that her year of birth was 1901 and her date of death was 1941, consistent with the age given on her daughter's birth certificate.

His daughter Rosie was born on 19 March 1925, according to her birth certificate in "Death Defying" (but in 1922 according to her gravestone in "Haunted") and lived at a nursing home until her death in 2004. Fellow reaper Penny (Yeardley Smith) (who died on the Titanic, referred to as a "boating accident") led Rube to Rosie, so Rube could be with her when she died. When Rube sat with her in the garden of the nursing home, Rosie recognized Rube as her father.

Five years after George becomes a member of his group of reapers, Rube unexpectedly disappears the same day Der Waffle Haus is burned down. The other members found this strange, but eventually assumed that he had "got his lights" and moved on to the afterlife.

== Mason ==
Ken Mason (Callum Blue) (1939–1966) claims he was born at a rock and roll concert behind a stack of amplifiers and died drilling a hole in his own head seeking a permanent high. Mason is originally from London (he reaped Rolling Stones guitarist Brian Jones in 1969) and was transferred to his present location some time ago. He is the only Reaper besides George whose doppelgänger has been depicted, by Canadian actor Jacob Chaos.

Mason collects money from the dead, steals from the living, deals, smuggles and uses drugs. He was an alcoholic and drug addict before he died, and though on at least one occasion he attempted to become sober, has continued these habits in response to the pressures of his job. He is attracted to Daisy, and is often protective of her. He became jealous when she became attracted to another man called Ray (Eric McCormack), whom Mason felt was dangerous; Mason eventually killed him in self-defense while trying to protect her. While he is drawn to attractive females, his feelings for Daisy seem to run much deeper. Mason said "I love you" to George on episode 13 and even kissed her, but that was probably because he was drunk. He has an edgy relationship with Rube; they dislike, but tolerate each other. Rube has on more than one occasion referred to Mason as an "idiot" or a "fuck-up", but Mason seems to at least want to gain Rube's approval.

Mason is the only one among the group of reapers who was visibly pleased that Rube has moved along and is no longer part of the team.

== Roxy Harvey ==
Roxanne "Roxy" Harvey (Jasmine Guy) invented leg warmers in 1982, and was then strangled with them by a jealous friend. She apparently has a very difficult time coming to terms with her own death, so with Rube's encouragement she marks the 21st anniversary of the event by burning her former possessions. Roxy and George are the only Reapers of the group with day jobs. She used to be a meter maid for the city, but entered the police academy at the beginning of the second season.

She is a cynical, no-nonsense woman with respect to both reaping and her day job and carried a handgun to intimidate people that she tickets to keep their arguments over parking tickets short. She is the only Reaper on the series shown to use her powers in anger, when she temporarily removed the soul of a particularly rude motorist. The man subsequently started a religion around her, much to Rube's dismay (The man reverted to his usual enraged self when Roxy gripped his testicles). She sometimes cannot sleep because of nightmares. Rube considers Roxy to be his "second in command" and left her in charge when he went away to locate his daughter's whereabouts. Assigned to investigate the disappearance of Ray Summers, Roxy concluded that Daisy and Mason had something to do with it, but she chose to cover for them, claiming that Ray, who had a police record, ran off to Portland, Oregon.

She is the most recent Reaper after George but is more mature than Daisy and Mason, who died at an earlier age than Roxy. Over time, George and Roxy develop a near-friendship as George acquires a greater sense of responsibility, impressing Roxy given her own police duties.

== Daisy Adair ==
Daisy Adair (Laura Harris) died by asphyxiation and smoke inhalation in Marietta, Georgia on December 13, 1938, in a fire on the set of Gone with the Wind (confirmed in the series finale, "Haunted"). She is an actress who frequently tells stories of her alleged sexual escapades with actors and celebrities including Charlie Chaplin, Bing Crosby, Douglas Fairbanks, Errol Flynn, Clark Gable, Cary Grant, William Holden, Tyrone Power, and Babe Ruth (also confirmed in the series finale). She claims to be one of the Greenwich "Adairs". Daisy was transferred from SoHo in New York City to join the group after Betty disappeared. Later on it is revealed that she was kicked out of New York for swindling the families of the recently deceased. Rube and several members of the Plague Division posed as police officers to break up her first con in Seattle, after which Rube told her he would not tolerate her doing this while working for him.

Behind her bravado, however, she is lonely, an insight most clearly revealed in an episode where her final thoughts before death were recorded as being "Why has no one ever loved me?". Her loose work ethic irks Rube greatly, though he never punishes her for it.

Daisy and George first become enemies when Daisy takes over for Betty, whom George liked immensely. Daisy then forces herself into George's apartment and even kicks her out of her own bed. Slowly, George realizes Daisy's demeanor is a front and warms to her slightly. Daisy responds by toning down her arrogant behavior. The two become friends by the end of the series, especially after Mason gives them his house to stay in.

Daisy and Mason have a rocky relationship because he is madly in love with her but her insecurities, expressed through sexuality, interfere with any type of loving relationship. Mason goes so far as to buy Daisy an engagement ring after she reveals to him that she long ago accepted that she would never get married, and though she refused to wear the ring on her hand, she kept it on a necklace for the remainder of the series. It is implied that she continues to have feelings for Mason, but the extent is never known.

In the episode "Be Still My Heart", Daisy reacts badly to the death of a woman at the hands of a man who is tired of having her as a mistress. Visibly shaken by the events, Daisy implicates the murderer and then leaves the victim's soul behind at the scene, infuriating Roxy. Daisy ends the episode and explains her bizarre behavior by asking Mason, "Did I ever tell you I had a sister?" This may imply that a similar situation happened to Daisy's sister.

Daisy met Ray Summers in the episode "Death Defying" and began dating him. In the episode "Forget Me Not", Daisy ended their relationship and Ray turned nasty, grabbing her by the throat and slamming her into the wall. Mason killed Ray in Daisy's defense. Mason was extremely upset by his actions and by the fact that "there's no Post-It", i.e. Ray was not scheduled to die then. To Mason's horror, a Graveling emerges from Ray's body, and Daisy says that she has seen that happen before. Mason buries Ray's body in the backyard. The Ray Graveling appears to retain some of Ray's personality or memories, as it hangs around Daisy and George's house and appears angry at Daisy, who begins drinking because of her feelings of guilt over his death. It even accompanies Daisy on one of her reaps, causing the unscheduled death of an innocent bystander. When the Ray Graveling menaces a sleeping Mason, George, who is unafraid of it, reaps the Graveling, who then disintegrates into dust. This Graveling was lighter in color than other Gravelings. The police search for Ray, but Roxy covers for Mason and Daisy as she understands something is wrong. Daisy is played by Sarah Wynter in the 2009 Direct to DVD movie Dead Like Me: Life After Death. Harris and Wynter previously portrayed sisters in the second season of the show 24.

== Betty Rhomer ==
Betty Rhomer (Rebecca Gayheart) died by jumping off a cliff into a river without realizing its height. She was a spunky woman who "can't sit still for very long", and disappeared after following a soul into his great beyond, not long after befriending George. Her disappearance into the great beyond was never fully explained in the series, as it appears to go against the rules for a reaper to "gain their lights". Her character was written out and replaced with Daisy at the direction of MGM due to the actress's real-life legal problems and their apparent discomfort of her role as a reaper. On November 27, 2001, Gayheart pleaded no contest to vehicular manslaughter. She was sentenced to three years of probation, a one-year suspension of her license, a $2,800 fine, and 750 hours of community service. The parents of the boy filed a wrongful death lawsuit, which was settled out of court.

She was known for sometimes using 1920s phrases. She had conversations with George about using aliases in the past. Her trademark was taking a Polaroid photo of the people whose souls she took while saying "Happy Thoughts!", and classifying those people by personality type. In the same way, George later classified Betty as "mysterious and reassuring".

Betty's gravestone shows the year of her death as 1926. In the episode "Curious George", we see Betty robbing her own grave and removing from the finger of her corpse a ring. In the episode "Reaping Havoc", George sees the ring and tells Betty she likes it. Betty replies, "I saw it in the Village in 1927; my boy bought it for me", a recollection at odds with her tombstone date.

== George's family ==
=== Joy Lass ===
Joy Lass (Cynthia Stevenson), born 1961, is George's mother. Described by George as a Virgo and a career legal secretary who enjoys ice skating and John Grisham novels, Joy is organized, neurotic, and a bit foul-mouthed. She hates the word "moist" because she thinks it sounds pornographic and is afraid of balloons. George observed that her mother's name is an ironic misnomer, noting, "Who had the nerve to name you 'Joy'?"

The aftermath of George's death was made worse for Joy by her husband's infidelity and her difficulty communicating with her remaining daughter. She eventually divorces Clancy; the terms of the divorce apparently left Joy with sole ownership and possession of the family residence at 3851 Beatrice Lane (the location of which is revealed in the first-season episode "Nighthawks").

Joy also confided to George (as Millie) that she does not think she was a very good mother. Unable to afford the childhood home of Georgia and Reggie, Joy began scouting with Reggie for other accommodations—as a result of which she met and began dating Angelo.

Her ex-husband, however, had been recently dumped by the woman with whom he cheated and, upon realizing Joy was dating, set out to sabotage his ex-wife's romantic plans. Clancy confessed in a later episode he missed her and the life he had with his family.

Joy is very disturbed by Reggie's fixation over George's death, and starts to worry about Reggie's sanity. In "Forget Me Not", she applied for job placement through Happy Time, where her résumé states that she was a history major at college with a business minor, worked for two law firms, and knows Gregg shorthand and medical shorthand.

Five years after George's death, Joy's disposition has made a significant change. Her neurotic nature and strict housekeeping requirements seem to have toned down. She has written a book based on her personal loss and counsels parents of deceased children.

=== Clancy Lass ===
Clancy Lass (Greg Kean), born c. 1960, is George's father and a Cancer. He is a tenured professor of English at the University of Washington. In "Pilot", George notes that he hugs another man for a long time which was part of a scrapped plot-line in which he was homosexual.

George becomes friends with a student, Charlotte, after a reap at the college where her father teaches, and unwittingly encourages Charlotte to meet Clancy outside of class. They later begin an affair. Charlotte dumped him before "Be Still My Heart".

He has vaguely implied wanting to come back to Joy in Season 2, but she rejected this overture.

Five years after George's death, Clancy has moved far away from his ex-wife and surviving daughter and had started a new family.

=== Reggie Lass ===
Regina "Reggie" Lass (Britt McKillip), born c. 1992, is George's younger sister, largely ignored by George before her death. Like George, she is intelligent and well-read, but rather difficult and emotionally complex. After George's death, Reggie developed a fixation with the way her sister died. She collected toilet seats and put them in a tree. After passing this stage, she grows distant from her mother, and is in danger of becoming even more disaffected with life than her late sister.

Reggie is opposed to Joy's decision to sell the family home: she told prospective buyers, "George visits me here" — which is, in fact, true as she has spotted George (as Millie) spying on the house from time to time. Despite her stressed relationship with her mother, she is very protective of her and scared away one potential suitor by claiming that George was murdered in her own home. In "Ashes To Ashes", she experimented with the Goth lifestyle, adopting the nickname "Spider". When J.F. the frog was left on her doorstep following the death of her dog J.D., she became convinced (correctly) that George was responsible. She used to believe that George was a ghost, but has abandoned that notion (or pretends to have). Even though she is unsure of George's whereabouts, she (again, correctly) believes George is still "living" somehow, and in "Haunted", her beliefs were apparently confirmed when she saw George face-to-face. At the end of season 2, she appeared to have been gradually warming up to her mother, Joy.

In the Dead Like Me film, Reggie is now a 16-year-old and has a better relationship with her mother. She is socially awkward and insecure, but secretly dates a popular high-school athlete who appears to be more in love with Reggie than his public girlfriend, but they only see each other in secret. After the boy is hospitalized following a severe car accident, she runs into George (appearing as Millie) multiple times. She thinks George is stalking her and confronts her, but instead finds out this strange, mysterious woman is in fact, her sister. During this time, George and Reggie begin to bond and be the sisters they were not when George was alive. Later, she wants to move in with the dead George, who demurs, calling it ill-advised. After George reaps Reggie's boyfriend, Reggie attempts to kill herself. After George stops her, Reggie realizes she should stop seeing George. Accepting that, she visits George's grave one more time, before urging Joy to move to a new location. Joy suggests they go on a vacation. Reggie is last seen staring out the window of the car as she and her mother leave for vacation. She sees George parked near the house, smiling at her as they drive by.

=== Phyllis ===
Phyllis (Barbara Barrie). "Grandma Phyl", Joy's mother, is constantly at odds with Joy, who considers Phyllis selfish. Where Joy is a compulsive, worrying, neat-freak, Phyllis is laid-back, worry-free, and seems to live day-to-day. She practices Buddhism. She participated in the various progressive movements during the 1960s at the expense, Joy believes, of her responsibilities, her husband, and daughter. Reggie appears to be fascinated by her, and Phyllis was apparently very close to George. Phyllis and Joy have a confrontational relationship. Joy felt abandoned by her mother as a child and resents Phyllis' disinterest in providing a stable home life.

== Happy Time ==
=== Delores Herbig ===
Delores Herbig (Christine Willes) "as in 'her big brown eyes'" (or as George once said "as in 'her big fat ass'" and "her big strange heart"). Delores is George's boss at Happy Time. She is highly obsessive-compulsive, which manifests in her dedication to propriety, correctness, and rules, and her artificial perkiness, which she believes to be the "right" attitude and tries very hard to maintain. She disliked George, but she displays a high appreciation for "Millie", both professionally and emotionally, and even goes so far as to model George's personnel file after her after Joy requests a copy. She occasionally mentions things from her past, such as having a cocaine habit in the 1980s, having her tattoos removed, and having restraining orders against her, which contrast with her current personality. She runs a webcam show from her apartment called Getting Things Done with Delores. She seems very happy and positive but is in fact quite sad and lonely, and is looking for a long-term relationship via online dating.

In the Dead Like Me film, Delores is still George's boss. Delores's perky veneer finally breaks down at the death of her beloved cat, Murray.

=== Crystal ===
Crystal Smith (Crystal Dahl). Crystal is the receptionist at Happy Time, also known as Jane Smith. She can be very strange, and George initially finds her intimidating when she stares frequently at George and anyone else for long periods and she often refuses interaction, though the two eventually establish a rapport. She has a lookalike boyfriend at Happy Time (also played by Crystal Dahl). How much she knows about George and the other Reapers is never fully revealed in the series. After seeing Millie and possibly recognizing her as George (due to its being Halloween) she looked up files regarding George, after Mason and "Millie" had left, but she finds that the files are unavailable. She has a closet full of Post-its which she steals from work. In "Vacation", she actually helped the Reapers complete some long overdue Reaper-related paperwork, but gave no indication to them whether she understood exactly what it was all about. Her Happy Time file shows that she speaks Spanish, French, Russian and Swahili, and that she served with the Special Forces in Southeast Asia.

=== Misty ===
Misty Favreaux (Meghan Black). Misty is a co-worker of George's at Happy Time, known for her promiscuity. She said she works 35 hours a week, spends 34 of those hours thinking about sex, and the other hour having it. According to her confidential Happy Time file, she attended the Wheeling School of the Arts where she was voted the most popular student. She claims to have two children, Sassoon and Jordache, and to be married in Louisiana and possibly Kansas. The same actress played a bank teller in the pilot episode, though this character is not Misty.

== Other living ==
=== Angus Cook ===
Angus Cook (John Kapelos). Angus Cook appeared the episodes "My Room" and "A Cook" as a line cook who had fallen into tough times because of a pyramid scheme where he lost everything. He disliked criticism about the food he prepared and passed this philosophy along to Rube, who reaped him and subsequently took over in the kitchen. Angus' spirit remained to coach Rube in the kitchen and pass along his philosophy that the cook should not bow to the demands of the customer. When Rube accepted this, only then did Angus pass on.

=== Kiffany ===
Kiffany (Patricia Idlette). Kiffany is the Reapers' regular waitress at Der Waffle Haus, and meets the odd goings on among the Reapers (bizarre conversations about death; Roxy shooting Mason in the foot; Mason committing a "lewd act" with a coconut slice) with extraordinary sang-froid. She has shown sympathetic interest in the characters, but never pries. She described Rube as a special customer, perhaps because he gives a $2 tip on a $7 breakfast. She seems to like George, as she gave her free oatmeal for her patience ("Hurry"). In the episode "Always", she banned Mason from Der Waffle Haus for stealing tips, relenting after he apologized and giving him money. She has evidently worked there for some time, as she knows Penny, another Reaper. Kiffany claims to have psychic powers (although she doesn't go out of her way to tell people about it). She reads palms, and in a Season Two deleted scene, became visibly upset upon examining George's lifeline, refusing to discuss it with her even after George begged her to. Being the Reapers' server since the first season, she has indicated she knows that Rube's group has unusual secrets. In the episode "Haunted", Kiffany doesn't seem fazed by the fact that the Reapers appear as they were when they were alive.

=== Trip Hesburgh ===
Thomas "Trip" Hesburgh III (Robin Dunne). Journalist; George's first serious relationship. George found herself liking Trip a great deal, and became extremely upset when she thought that Trip was her reap, Thomas Hesburgh Jr, though it was soon revealed that Trip was Thomas Hesburgh III and she was supposed to reap Trip's father instead. He seems very unhappy despite being raised in a wealthy family, and seems tired of the social superficialities of his wealthy upbringing. He is often nagged by his older sister Ashley. He became George's first lover and called her his girlfriend, but it is uncertain whether any sort of relationship will actually develop. After spending the night with George, he never called or sought her out again, sending George into a rage. He and Ashley know George by her real name (rather than by her Millie alias), a revelation which Mason chides her for (although all the other reapers introduce themselves to the living with their real names throughout the series).

=== Angelo ===
Angelo (Peter Williams). Angelo owns a loft apartment that Joy and Reggie looked at in "In Escrow", and is briefly Joy's love interest. He is smooth-talking, urbane, and artistically talented. He somehow knew that the Lass dog was a golden retriever without ever having been told.

=== Ray Summers ===
Ray Summers (Eric McCormack) d. 2004. Ray was a reality television producer who struck up a romantic relationship with Daisy when she met him during an assignment in "Death Defying". He came off as extremely obnoxious and overbearing and was disliked by Rube, George, and especially Mason. Ray disliked Mason, identifying him as a rival for Daisy's affections. He was manipulative and abusive towards Daisy. Unknown to Daisy, Ray had a criminal record that included assault and fraud charges. He was killed by Mason when he attacked Daisy. Mason claimed, "The first [hit] was in self defense, but the next three were a bit murderous." Ray's soul became a Graveling after his death, and stayed near Daisy, causing her to sink into depression because of her feelings of guilt over Ray's death. The Ray Graveling was particularly malevolent, following Daisy to one of her reaps and causing the unscheduled death of an innocent bystander, which affected Daisy even more. In "Always", the Ray Graveling was reaped by George, turning into dust and disintegrating.

=== Charlotte ===
Charlotte (A. J. Cook). Charlotte is a university student. She and George met in "Sunday Mornings", after Mason saved her from being raped. They became friends, and she took George to her course on the sonnets taught by George's father, Clancy. She begins a relationship with Clancy, but breaks up with him (off camera) sometime before the episode "Be Still My Heart".

== Other undead ==
=== Charlie ===
Charlie, the pet Reaper (Spencer Achtymichuk) (1988–1997) was hit by a drunk driver. A young boy, Charlie appeared three times to reap pets, one of which was George's family's dog. He encountered both George and Reggie. Reggie attempted to befriend him, while George asked him where he lived, and gave him some money when he replied "just here and there". Charlie is one of the few Reapers who regularly refer to George as "Toilet Seat Girl", much to her annoyance. A young girl is portrayed as being another pet Reaper in Dead Like Me: Life After Death.

=== Penny ===
Penny (Yeardley Smith) died 1912 in the Titanic disaster, after which she developed a dislike of ice (even in beverages). Penny used to be a member of Rube's group in "External Influences", and now works for "Natural Causes", based upon how reapers are assigned to their division (see The Lawn Bowlers), it is logical to assume she either drowned or died from hypothermia (though hypothermia is more likely). She first appeared in "Forget Me Not" when George had a reap at the hospital. In "Always", she showed Rube the Post-It for his daughter Rosie, and allowed him to accompany her to the nursing home where Rosie stayed, giving him a few minutes to visit his daughter before her death. She seems to get on well with Kiffany (who does not seem to comment on the fact she hasn't aged) and also seems well liked by Roxy and Mason. She had not previously met Daisy or George. Her usual drink is iced tea without the ice.

=== Plague Division ===
Pete and Company. Pete and two other unnamed male reapers were seen in the episode "Unfinished Business". Pete is a police detective and the other two are beat cops. According to Pete, they have nothing but time on their hands as they work in the "Plague Division". Pete and his friends give Rube a hand to break up Daisy's séance scam in the aforementioned episode, getting shot several times by Rube. A humorous conversation about what sort of bullets hurt the most follows.

The Lawn Bowlers. On the deleted scenes section of the First Season DVD (and later shown on Scifi Channel during their run), Mason and George are in a park, and notice several members of the Plague Division involved in a game of lawn bowling. During this scene, Mason explains how reapers are assigned to their division; since the lawn bowlers died of the Plague, they are assigned to the Plague Division. However, they've been out of work for the last 600 years, since no one dies from Plague anymore. George suggests that some other disease may come up, such as Ebola, when the bowlers notice a squirrel approach a pair of picnickers. Mason tells George they're expressing interest because squirrels were carriers of the Plague and thought if one of the picnickers was bit, there could be a new outbreak.

=== The unnamed person ===
This nameless, silent individual, seen mostly at the opening and closing of Rube's elevator door, delivers to him the names of those about to die in a manila envelope. In one episode it is seen as an actual shadow, and the envelope only became corporeal when it slid across the threshold of Rube's apartment. This person or being's identity and rank in death's hierarchy have never been revealed. Rube has attempted to coax this person into revealing him/her/itself by cooking it a traditional Italian meal and is usually respectful of its visits, only picking up the envelope after it has walked away from his door. On one occasion, however, Rube followed the shadow toward the elevator, complaining about Angus Cook at Der Waffel Haus, whom Rube had befriended, being on the list. When Betty Rohmer jumped after a soul into the afterlife, Rube left a post-it on the door asking the person, "What happened to her?", though it is unknown if he ever received an answer.

== Animals ==
=== J.D. ===
J.D., d. 2004. One of George's reaps left behind J.D., a Golden Retriever in "A Cook". George agreed to take care of the dog and tried to keep him, but soon passed him on to her family. Reggie decided that J.D. stands for "Just Dog". He seemed fond of Clancy. In "Last Call", he was killed by a car, after Charlie had reaped his soul.

=== Mr. Blinky ===
J.F. formerly known as Mr. Frog and Mr. Blinky by his original owner, is a yellow frog that belonged to George's first reap, a young girl, and which apparently followed George home. Following the death of J.D., George secretly left the frog with Reggie, who dubbed it J.F. for "Just Frog" and is convinced the frog came from George. The frog, along with other frog imagery, has been used from time to time to symbolize the cycle of life and death, a recurring motif responding to George's tale about the origins of death, from the beginning of the pilot episode.

=== Murray ===
Murray is Delores Herbig's aging cat. He requires dialysis three times a week, and has bladder problems. Despite the nuisances of his aging, Delores loves him greatly and is distraught in an episode where he falls ill. This is the episode where George first meets Charlie, realizing what he is from the Post-It in his comic book. She warns Delores not to let him touch Murray; Charlie reaps a rabbit instead, telling Delores that he thinks Murray will be just fine.

Murray dies in the Dead Like Me movie, and ashes reported to be his are blasted into space. The urn actually contains the ashes of Cameron Kane; whether it contains Murray's ashes as well is unclear.
