= Get to the Heart (disambiguation) =

Get to the Heart is a 1985 album by American country singer Barbara Mandrell.

Get to the Heart may also refer to:

- Get to the Heart: My Story, a 1990 autobiography by Barbara Mandrell
- Get to the Heart: The Barbara Mandrell Story, a 1997 biographical film about Barbara Mandrell
