= Sarah Wynter =

Australian actress (born 1973)

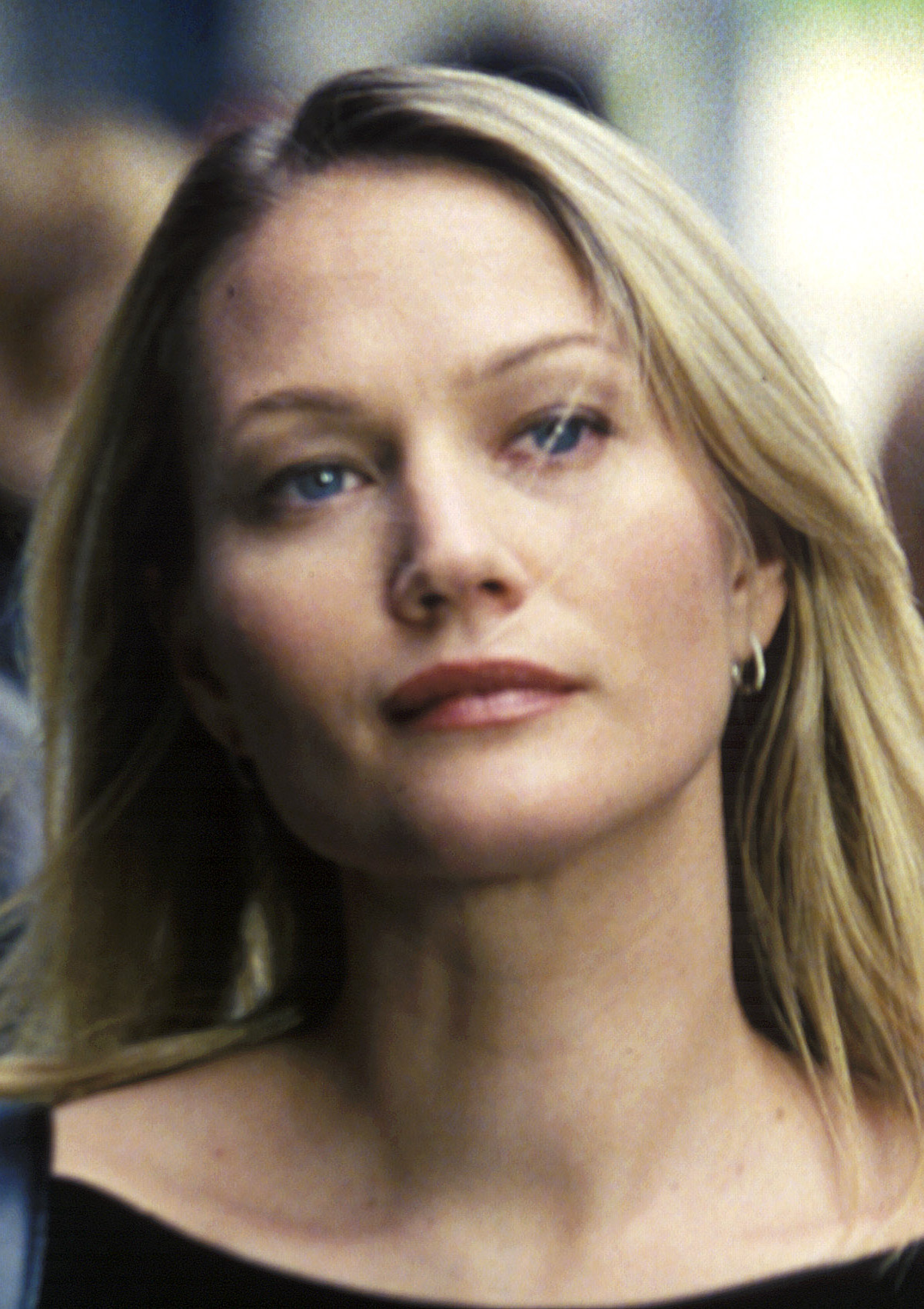
- Wynter in Three Dollars (2005)
- Born: 15 February 1973 (age 53); Newcastle, New South Wales, Australia
- Occupation: Actress
- Years active: 1997–present
- Spouse: Dan Peres (m. 2005; div. 2014)
- Children: 3

Sarah Wynter (born 15 February 1973) is an Australian actress, known for her roles on American television – such as Kate Warner on the television drama 24, as Beth on Windfall, and as Keitha on Flight of the Conchords.

== Early life ==
Wynter was born in Newcastle, New South Wales, the daughter of Helen Cummings, a worker in the Newcastle registry of the Family Court of Australia and lately author, and Stuart Wynter, a physician.

Her grandmother, Joy Cummings, was the Lord Mayor of Newcastle – Australia's first female Lord Mayor. In 1984, her father killed his second wife and Sarah's half-sister before killing himself.

== Career ==
Wynter's interest in acting led her to move to New York City when she was 17 to study drama.

=== Television ===
Wynter earned her SAG card by landing a role on the Sex and the City pilot, playing what she later summarized as the first woman to have sex on that show.

A few years later, she was recognised by SAG again, as part of the second-season cast of 24 when it earned a SAG Award nomination as Best Performance by an Ensemble in a Drama Series. Wynter played Kate Warner and appeared in all 24 episodes plus the third-season premiere, and she provided her voice for 24: The Game. She had a recurring role in The Dead Zone and starred in the series Windfall in 2006.

In 2009, Sarah appeared in "Unnatural Love", an episode of the second season of Flight of the Conchords as "Keitha", the Australian girlfriend of Jemaine. In 2013 she played the role of Whitney Robshaw in "Protest Too Much" the 17th episode of the third season of the CBS police procedural drama Blue Bloods. She signed on to Damages in a recurring role. She guest starred in the episode "Identity Crisis" in the first season of Person of Interest, and appeared in Californication. She also appears on Law & Order: Special Victims Unit Season 18 episode "Motherly Love".

=== Film ===
Wynter's first movie was Species II as the fiancée of the infected astronaut Patrick Ross. Wynter appeared in The 6th Day alongside Arnold Schwarzenegger and Lost Souls with Winona Ryder as well as numerous independent movies such as Shooting Livien. Her Australian feature film debut Three Dollars was released in 2005. She was also cast as Daisy Adair in Dead Like Me: Life After Death, the straight-to-DVD movie version of Showtime TV series Dead Like Me, replacing Laura Harris who had played her sister on 24.

Australian director Bruce Beresford cast Wynter as the lead in Bride of the Wind, his ambitious 2001 biopic of Alma Mahler, the wife of composer Gustav Mahler (and, after Mahler's death, of architect Walter Gropius and subsequently of writer Franz Werfel).

== Personal life ==
On 20 August 2005, Wynter married Details magazine editor-in-chief Dan Peres in Sydney. The couple have three children. After struggling with infertility, her first son was born in 2008. After two attempts at IVF and a miscarriage, Wynter gave birth to twin boys in 2011. Following the birth of the twins, Wynter developed postpartum psychosis which took several years for her to recover from. Wynter and Peres divorced in 2014.
