= Crystal Dahl =

Canadian actress

Crystal Dahl is a Canadian actress, perhaps best known for her role as Crystal Smith in the drama-comedy television series Dead Like Me, and the subsequent film Dead Like Me: Life After Death. She was born in New Westminster, British Columbia at the Royal Columbian Hospital.

Dahl appeared in an uncredited role in the new Outer Limits series in the seventh season episode Rule of Law. She has an uncredited precision driving situation in 3000 Miles to Graceland and also appears in Scary Movie 3 demonstrating a Mother Teresa bobblehead.

She has appeared in Jack N Box, Bar None and Cat Swallows Parakeet and Speaks.

Her stage credits include: The Grand Old Duke of York and Can You See Me Yet?
