= Hall Render =

Law firm

Hall, Render, Killian, Heath & Lyman, P.C.
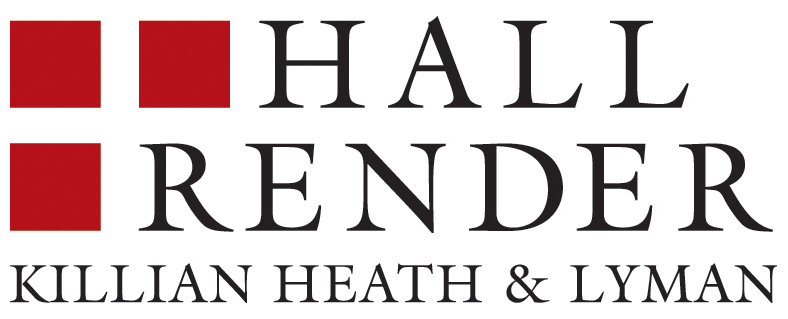
- No. of offices: 10
- No. of attorneys: 150
- Major practice areas: Health Care Law
- Date founded: 1967
- Founders: William S. Hall, John C. Render
- Website: hallrender.com

Hall Render is an American health care-focused law firm. The firm concentrates on health law and other areas in the health care industry, serving health systems, hospitals, physician organizations, post-acute and ancillary providers, ambulatory surgery centers, provider-sponsored health plans, and other health care industry partners.

Hall Render was founded in 1967 in Indianapolis and most recently opened its 10th office in Annapolis, Maryland.

== History ==
William S. Hall and John C. Render started Hall Render in 1967 as general counsel to the Indiana Hospital Association. The firm has continued to focus on health care law, becoming Hall, Render, Killian, Heath & Lyman in 1984 and gradually expanding to 9 offices across the United States.

Hall Render now has 150 attorneys serving health care industry clients.

== Office Locations ==
Hall Render has offices in Anchorage, Dallas, Denver, Detroit, Indianapolis, Milwaukee, Raleigh, Seattle and Washington, DC.

== Rankings and awards ==
In November 2016, Hall Render was named in U.S. News & World Report and Best Lawyers® 2017's "Best Law Firms" rankings. The firm received a national first-tier ranking in health care law and metropolitan first-tier rankings in health care law in Colorado, Indianapolis, Milwaukee, and Troy, as well as construction law in Louisville. Hall Render attorneys are annually selected by their peers for inclusion in Best Lawyers' The Best Lawyers in America listing and included in Super Lawyers listings in several markets across the nation.

In June 2016, Modern Healthcare named Hall Render as the second-largest healthcare law firm in the country. The publication is known for providing the industry with competitive rankings and practical information for all areas of the healthcare industry. In its June 27/July 4, 2016 issue, the rankings were released and reflect results based on the number of attorneys spending at least 50 percent of their time on health law.

== Leadership ==
The president and CEO is Gregg Wallander, and each office has a managing partner with connections in the regional health care community. William H. Thompson currently serves as the board chairman, and was a former president of the firm as well as a former student of firm founder, John Render. Chairman of the Firm Bill Thompson received the Distinguished Alumni Award from the Indiana University Richard M. Fairbanks School of Public Health Alumni Association in 2015. The attorneys in the Denver office work with clients on health care, employment and antitrust matters.
