= The 12 Disasters of Christmas =

Holiday disaster movie of 2012

- Australian DVD cover
- Genre: Disaster
- Written by: Rudy Thauberger; Sydney Roper
- Directed by: Steven R. Monroe
- Starring: Ed Quinn; Magda Apanowicz; Andrew Airlie; Roark Critchlow; Holly Elissa; Greg Kean; Kaj-Erik Eriksen; Donnelly Rhodes; Brenna O'Brien; Christine Willes; Ryan Grantham
- Music by: Michael Neilson
- Countries of origin: Canada; United States
- Original language: English

Production
- Executive producers: Tom Berry; Paul Hertzberg; Lisa M. Hansen
- Producer: John Prince
- Cinematography: Anthony C. Metchie
- Editor: Christopher A. Smith
- Running time: 90 minutes
- Production companies: CineTel Films; Golden Ring Productions

Original release
- Network: Syfy
- Release: December 8, 2012

The 12 Disasters of Christmas (released on home media as 12 Disasters) is a Canadian-American disaster television film produced for Syfy in 2012 and directed by Steven R. Monroe.

== Plot ==
In a small town called Calvary, a rain of ice spears puts everyone on notice. Just before Jacey's (Magda Apanowicz) grandmother dies, she gives a mystical ring to her explaining that she is the chosen one to stop the end of the world prophesied by the Maya for December 21, 2012. Jacey was born right at Christmas, her parents are named Joseph (Ed Quinn) and Mary (Holly Elissa), and the solution is in the hidden message of the popular Christian holiday song "The 12 Days of Christmas", where a different disaster corresponds to each day and the "five gold rings" provide a messianic gift.

== Cast ==
- Ed Quinn as Joseph
- Magda Apanowicz as Jacey
- Holly Elissa as Mary
- Roark Critchlow as Kane
- Andrew Airlie as Jude
- Ryan Grantham as Peter
- Greg Kean as Sheriff
- Kaj-Erik Eriksen as Aaron
- Donnelly Rhodes as Grant
- Brenna O'Brien as Elizabeth
- Christine Willes as Miriam

== Release ==
The 12 Disasters of Christmas first premiered on the Syfy network on December 8, 2012, at 9PM Eastern. It became Syfy's most watched television film on its premiere since February that year. The DVD version was released on January 6, 2014.

== Reception ==
The film received negative ratings, but critics have noted that the film is entertaining despite its lack of quality. The New York Times stated that "the movie gets an F in most of the traditional critical categories. Dialogue? F. Coherence? F. But in terms of serving as a counterweight to the syrupy fare that clogs almost every other network at this time of year, this ridiculous mess earns an A+." The New York Daily News gave the film one star out of five, opining that "some bad movies just bore you, while others create a perverse fascination, an aura that keeps you watching in the hope they will never get better. The Twelve Disasters of Christmas does not. It stays true to the path on which it embarked, seemingly never troubled for a second by concern for trivial matters like, oh, dialogue or plot." The A.V. Club gave the film a D rating stating "...comes closer to so-bad-it's-good territory than any SyFy Original Movie in recent memory."

== See also ==
- List of Christmas films
