= A Friend of the Family (2005 film) =

2005 Canadian television film

- Based on: A Friend of the Family by Alison Shaw
- Written by: Michael Amo
- Directed by: Stuart Gillard
- Starring: Laura Harris
- Music by: Lawrence Shragge
- Country of origin: Canada
- Original language: English

Production
- Producers: Tom Cox; Jordy Randall; Elaine Scott; Jon Slan
- Cinematography: Manfred Guthe
- Editors: Bert Kish; Robin Russell
- Running time: 91 minutes
- Production companies: Alberta Filmworks; Slanted Wheel Entertainment

Original release
- Release: February 2005

A Friend of the Family is a 2005 Canadian TV movie based on Alison Shaw's 1998 non-fiction book of the same name. It was directed by Stuart Gillard and stars Laura Harris.

== Plot ==
After escaping an attack in Toronto, artist Alison Shaw moves with her husband to a small rural town. They are welcomed warmly by David Snow, but Alison begins to suspect that David may be a mass murderer.

== Cast ==
- Laura Harris as Alison Shaw
- Eric Johnson as Darris Shaw
- Kim Coates as David Snow
- Sabrina Grdevich as Heidi
- Greg Lawson as Police Chief Milt Mooney
- Shaun Johnston as Coleridge
- David LeReaney as Dr. Gordean

== Production ==
Filming took place in Alberta and Ontario, Canada.
