= List of Dead Like Me episodes =

The cover of the Region 1 first season DVD boxset released by MGM

Dead Like Me is an American comedy-drama television series created by Bryan Fuller that premiered on June 27, 2003, on Showtime in the United States and ended on October 31, 2004. The show spans two seasons, with a total of 29 episodes. The original pilot is 74 minutes long, while the episodes that follow are 40 to 50 minutes. Showtime canceled the series due to declining ratings in the second season, even though originally they claimed the show had three times higher ratings than the network's primetime average. Various actors also mentioned that the show had backstage problems, which was one of the reasons the creator left the series during the first season.

Both seasons of Dead Like Me were released on DVD in United States and United Kingdom in 2004 and 2005, respectively. A direct-to-DVD film titled Dead Like Me: Life After Death was released on February 17, 2009. The episodes were filmed primarily in Vancouver, British Columbia.

== Series overview ==
| Season | Episodes | Originally released | |
| Season | Episodes | First released | Last released |
|---|---|---|---|
| 1 | 14 | June 27, 2003 | September 26, 2003 |
| 2 | 15 | July 25, 2004 | October 31, 2004 |

== Episodes ==
=== Season 1 (2003) ===
The first season premiered with a 74-minute pilot episode on June 27, 2003, which was split into two different episodes with added deleted scenes for syndication. It consisted of 14 episodes, and ended on September 26, 2003. The story begins with George Lass getting killed by a toilet seat falling from the de-orbiting Mir Space Station and having to face the fact that she is now dead but still amongst living people, working as a grim reaper. George meets other grim reapers, each with their own problems, and has to learn how to do her job efficiently. While breaking the rules and testing the patience of her handler, George learns by the end of season just how important her job is.

| No. overall | No. in season | Title | Directed by | Written by | Original release date | Prod. code |
|---|---|---|---|---|---|---|
| 1 | 1 | "Pilot" | Scott Winant | Bryan Fuller | June 27, 2003 | 100 |
When smart, cynical 18-year-old Georgia 'George' Lass is killed by an errant toilet seat falling from space, she joins the ranks of an undead group of grim reapers. It's her job to reap the souls from the living and guide them to their eternal reward. Besides coping with her new job, she must learn to deal with being young and starting out – and of course, being dead. George is introduced to her droll boss Rube and fellow reapers: Wisecracking Betty, moody British ex-musician Mason, and cynical meter maid Roxy, all of whom show her around her first few days on the job. George's first dreaded assignment is a difficult one: she has to collect the soul of a little girl.
| 2 | 2 | "Dead Girl Walking" | Kevin Dowling | Bryan Fuller | July 4, 2003 | 101/P454 |
After a week of performing her duties as a grim reaper, George concludes that the job is not for her, so she decides to leave the soul of her most recent client inside his dead body. When she witnesses the consequences of her actions, though, she begins to accept the fact that her new existence does serve an important purpose. Meanwhile, Mason resorts to stealing money from parking meters by stealing Roxy's meter keys. George's parents continue to have difficulty dealing with George's death, which leads to her troubled and neglected younger sister, Reggie, to steal toilet seats from school and the neighborhood.
| 3 | 3 | "Curious George" | Peter Lauer | Peter Ocko | July 11, 2003 | 102/P455 |
George misses her family and decides to pay them a visit, but when reaper boss Rube hears of George's sentimental journey, he forbids her from making it again. Despite the warning, George cannot stop herself from going home...until she discovers the price the dead pay for hanging on to their past. Strapped for money, she, under her new alias Mildred, takes a dreary office job at the Happy Time temp agency, the same place she worked on her last morning alive, where she has to put up with her overbearing and officious supervisor Dolores Herbig. At the Lass' household, the family prepares to have their picture taken, but Joy cannot cope with George's absence. Reggie continues to avoid talking about her feelings as she tries to make spiritual contact with George. George deals with back-to-back souls to reap at a rural gas station which involves a caged bear. As Mason goes to painful lengths to nab more souls, Betty takes a more casual approach, and Roxy continues to settle on her no-nonsense hard-line approach.
| 4 | 4 | "Reapercussions" | Peter Lauer | Dan Fesman & Harry Victor | July 18, 2003 | 103/P457 |
After discovering a loophole in the "reaper rules", George decides to test fate and help a man miss his appointment with destiny, but when she sees the devastating domino effect of her actions – and receives a drastic punishment – she learns a lesson about fate she will not soon forget. George also deals with more of Delores's office policy, and with weird receptionist Crystal. Rube and Mason face one mishap after another during an airport excursion to reap some gambling souls, and Mason is detained for drug smuggling. Reggie further withdraws into her own world after Joy finds her keeping a dead bird in a box.
| 5 | 5 | "Reaping Havoc" | James Marshall | J. J. Philbin | July 25, 2003 | 104/P456 |
Since becoming a grim reaper, Georgia has become quite friendly with glamorous co-reaper Betty. When the dazzling but restless Betty becomes too curious about the other side, Georgia learns that even in the afterlife, friends are hard to keep. Mason reaps an old woman and spends some time with her while awaiting the time to send her to the afterlife in order to loot her personal savings. George continues dealing with the overly cheerful and obnoxious Delores, to whom she invents a new persona for herself in order to try to find a direction to her current afterlife.
| 6 | 6 | "My Room" | David Grossman | Dan Fesman & Harry Victor | August 1, 2003 | 105/P458 |
When Daisy Adair, a gorgeous but demanding and arrogant actress, joins the group of reapers as Betty's replacement, Rube moves her in with Georgia. Immediately, Daisy steamrolls over George's privacy and patience, and a reluctant Georgia must find the courage to speak up for herself. George is put on the Happy Time bowling team and we see a caring side to her, as well as a competitive side to Delores. Rube has a run-in with Joy at a psychiatrist's office while searching for his latest assignment. At the same time, Joy finds the "toilet seat tree" that Reggie constructed and forces the troubled girl to see a child psychologist.
| 7 | 7 | "Reaper Madness" | Robert Duncan McNeill | Tom Spezialy | August 8, 2003 | 106/P459 |
George is romantically drawn to a schizophrenic named Ronnie Dobbs, who seems able to see death as she does. When Rube grows concerned Georgia might be revealing too much to the young man, he forbids her from seeing him anymore. George persists, tempting chaos of biblical proportions. At Happy Time, George is assigned to train a new worker named Fiona, who looks up to her as a role model. Mason continues to try to win Daisy's affections when they're assigned to reap a bride and groom at a wedding, in which Ronnie is involved. Meanwhile, Clancy and Joy are arguing about sending Reggie to a private school as George secretly continues sending Reggie coded letters inspiring her to move on with her life.
| 8 | 8 | "A Cook" | Kevin Dowling | John Masius & Stephen Godchaux | August 15, 2003 | 108/P461 |
Georgia decides to care for the beautiful golden retriever her latest victim has left behind, and Rube steps in as a grill cook at the reapers' hangout, Der Waffle Haus, to replace the man whose soul he recently took. Both find themselves feeling lost and out of place, but as they boldly face their predicaments head-on, the two reapers finally figure out where they belong.
| 9 | 9 | "Sunday Mornings" | Peter Lauer | Peter Ocko | August 22, 2003 | 107/P460 |
An assignment leads Georgia to a college campus, where she befriends a fresh-faced co-ed named Charlotte, who has a curious fascination for a literature professor... George's father Clancy! Sitting in class with her new friend, George gets to know her dad – and herself – in a way she never did in life. Meanwhile, Roxy "rage-reaps" the belligerent recipient of one of her parking tickets, who later believes he's had a powerful religious experience.
| 10 | 10 | "Business Unfinished" | David Straiton | Dan Fesman & Harry Victor & J. J. Philbin | August 29, 2003 | 109/P462 |
As Daisy talks both Georgia and Mason into helping her swindling one of her wealthy victim's sons out of a lot of money. Roxy mourns the 21st anniversary of her own death. Rube keeps a careful eye on his "minions." Daisy's con is on and the grief is great... And Rube's got valuable lessons about the afterlife for all.
| 11 | 11 | "The Bicycle Thief" | Peter Lauer | Paul Lieberstein | September 5, 2003 | 110/P463 |
George can not afford to buy herself a new bicycle she wants, so she gets a new job. Immediately, Delores and the other unconventional co-workers at her old job begin planning a farewell party. Meanwhile, Mason mingles with a gay couple that he's assigned to reap, and Daisy is stalked by the soul of a passionate painter. Soon, all of the reapers begin to realize just how important the part they play in people's lives. Mason then offers George and Daisy his house for both of them to live in as an act of kindness. At the Lass household, Joy loses Reggie's dog when it runs off which causes the tensions among the insecure family to further escalate.
| 12 | 12 | "Nighthawks" | James Whitmore Jr. | Stephen Godchaux & Bridget Carpenter | September 12, 2003 | 111/P464 |
Taking souls is taking its toll on George. Unable to sleep, she wanders to the reapers Waffle Haus hangout, where she is angry to find she was not invited to take the self-examination test that Rube is currently occupying the other reapers since she is only a novice and having served less than a year. But George's anger quickly turns to panic when she learns that Rube has an assignment to take a soul at her family's house that very night. At the same time, Mason, Daisy, Roxy, as well as George and Rube, reminisce about their most interesting assignments in the past year.
| 13 | 13 | "Vacation" | David Grossman | Peter Ocko | September 19, 2003 | 112/P465 |
Death takes the day off. So Rube recruits the reapers to help him with some clerical work. As the soul-takers file their victims' last thoughts, they all realize what truly mattered to them in life. Especially George, who fondly remembers the summer vacations she spent with her family at the lake. In the present, Joy, Clancy and Reggie go on their annual vacation to the lake, the first without George, where neither one of them enjoys the scenery anymore. Back in Seattle, George has a brilliant idea to make a long-process finish earlier by breaking into the Happy Time offices after hours to download the list digitally. While entering records into the database of last thoughts, Mason stumbles upon Daisy's last thought.
| 14 | 14 | "Rest in Peace" | Helen Shaver | John Masius & Stephen Godchaux | September 26, 2003 | 113/P466 |
On the first anniversary of George's death, Rube grants her the day off. Motivated to get her afterlife back on track again, she returns to Happy Time temp agency to ask for her old job back. But after being bluntly rejected by Delores, George pouts through yet another drab day... Until the universal powers-that-be intervene and inspire her to try to live her afterlife to the fullest. Meanwhile, Rube goes on a reap-assignment to a yoga class where he shares a few good words with the instructor. Mason asks Daisy's assistance to help him hook up with a living woman. Elsewhere, the Lasses prepare to visit Georgia's grave for the first time since her death to put the past behind them.

=== Season 2 (2004) ===
The second season premiered on July 25, 2004, and ran for 15 episodes, concluding on October 31, 2004. The season explores the lives of other grim reapers while following the story of George, who has now been promoted at her daily job and is beginning to explore her love life. Roxy advances in her career; Daisy finds herself in an abusive relationship; Mason fights to stop drinking; Rube is facing ghosts from his past; and Joy and Clancy have to adapt to the end of their marriage.

| No. overall | No. in season | Title | Directed by | Written by | Original release date | Prod. code |
|---|---|---|---|---|---|---|
| 15 | 1 | "Send in the Clown" | James Whitmore Jr. | Story by : John Masius & Stephen Godchaux; Teleplay by : Stephen Godchaux | July 25, 2004 | 201 |
As George develops a crush on Brennan, the cute, but dim-witted intern at the temp agency Happy Time, everyone there, including Delores, discourages her from allowing it to blossom into anything more. Rube accompanies Mason to his assignment to collect a soul at a kid's birthday party, which devastates him. Joy and Clancy decide to divorce after she finds out that he has been cheating on her with his female college students. Roxy decides to quit her meter maid job and join the police academy. Daisy steals a silver cross necklace from Roxy's latest victim.
| 16 | 2 | "The Ledger" | Jeff Woolnough | Stephen Godchaux & Bridget Carpenter | August 1, 2004 | 202 |
George is bummed when she finds out that her parents are selling the home in which she grew up. Then, things turn from bad to worse for her when her bicycle gets stolen, and at Happy Time she is suspected of stealing office supplies. George finally decides to embrace her bad side by claiming a red Mustang car from one of her reaps. Daisy goes on her assignment to the jewelry shop to reap the owner and to claim more crosses. Mason sets out to prove to everyone that he is not drinking anymore.
| 17 | 3 | "Ghost Story" | Milan Cheylov | Stephen Godchaux & Annie Weisman | August 8, 2004 | 203 |
Feeling like she does not fit in, George decides to shirk her reaping duties and go on Happy Time's annual camping retreat. However, even there she cannot escape from her duties as Rube follows with an assignment. Back on the job in Seattle, Daisy and Mason must scramble to find the Post-it note he lost before tragedy occurs because of his ineptitude. Joy does her best to sell her house, but Reggie scares the potential buyers away by saying that George, her late sister, still keeps in touch with her from beyond the grave.
| 18 | 4 | "The Shallow End" | Sarah Pia Anderson | Stephen Godchaux & Karl Gajdusek | August 15, 2004 | 204 |
The episode starts with a young George floating motionless in a pool. Through flashbacks throughout the episode, we learn that George was pushed by Beth-Ann, a loner who was attempting to impress a group of popular girls. In the present day, George has a new intern named Ethan, whom she abuses to make him like her more--a practice she learned from Mason and Rube. Withholding affection works until she takes it too far. Roxy deals with bad guys on her first day as a cop. Mason reaps an older, naked, man who refuses to pass on until he can attend his own funeral. Daisy counsels her reap, a transgender person who is angry at God. Reggie goes shopping with her mother. At the end of the episode, George reflects on wanting to be liked. She says "When I was ten, something happened to me, and something happened to Beth-Ann Miller. And it changed both of our lives forever." It is then revealed that while floating, two gravelings entered the pool through an underwater vent but decided not to claim her. It is not clear whether she saw them or not before the lifeguards pulled her to safety.
| 19 | 5 | "Hurry" | Robert Duncan McNeill | Stephen Godchaux & Bridget Carpenter | August 22, 2004 | 205 |
When a stuffy and no-nonsense efficiency expert comes to Happy Time, George's boss Delores forces her to crack the whip like never before. Daisy goes to a speed dating group to find 'J. Allen' and finds a sensitive young man driven to the edge by rejection. Mason commandeers a bicycle and attempts to track down an old friend to reap him. Roxy travels to the local airport to reap an angry French tourist fuming over her lost luggage. Rube waits at a post office for an old letter—which breaks his heart. Reggie is reluctant to attend band practice, while the bitter Joy struggles with her divorce proceedings.
| 20 | 6 | "In Escrow" | Steve Beers | Stephen Godchaux & Annie Weisman | August 29, 2004 | 206 |
At Happy Time, George is paralyzed by indecision when she must hire an employee from a pool of three desperate applicants. Reggie is paralyzed by fear when she's abandoned by her babysitter while her mother, Joy, spends an evening with an Angelo, whom she met while hunting for a new place to live. Mason meets and reaps an aging rock star hero from his youth. Roxy tells Daisy that the relatives of the victim from which Daisy stole her cross want it back. Rube has the team come together for a major reap assignment involving a mass shooting spree that brings George's story to a head.
| 21 | 7 | "Rites of Passage" | James Whitmore, Jr. | Stephen Godchaux & Karl Gajdusek | September 5, 2004 | 207 |
George's co-reapers become jealous when she's assigned to pluck the soul of a famous rock star planning to give a live concert at a TV studio, but the duty proves to be more of a pain than a pleasure due to the idol's entourage who block George's effort to get close enough to touch him to claim his soul. Mason messes up big time when he is diverted from his reap assignment to flirt with a Goth groupie. Roxy's day job as a policewoman comes to the fore in an unexpected way as she's forced to help Mason out. Daisy confides in (then reaps) a disillusioned priest, which causes her to reexamine her Catholic roots. The arrival of Joy's eccentric mother, Phyllis, whom she cannot stand, creates friction in the Lass household.
| 22 | 8 | "The Escape Artist" | David Grossman | Bridget Carpenter | September 12, 2004 | 208 |
George is sent to a country club and is attracted to Trip Hesberg (Robin Dunne), the son of her reap. Roxy and Mason are given tickets (and Post-Its) for a flight to Cancún to reap a cheating groom and stewardess. Rube makes Daisy keep him company for his reap at Reggie's school. Reggie meets Charlie, the pet reaper. Joy and free-spirited Grandma Phyll continue to clash.
| 23 | 9 | "Be Still My Heart" | Tony Westman | Annie Weisman | September 19, 2004 | 209 |
George attends the funeral of Trip's father. Mason becomes the sensible one when he crashes the funeral ceremony to steal. Daisy dresses up as a maid to sneak into a hotel room for her reap, a mistress who is murdered in a hotel room by her married lover. Daisy is so traumatized by this reap that she abandons the soul and leaves a clue for the police, two reaper mistakes. Later, she tells Mason that she had a sister (implying that her sister may have come to a similar end). Rube places Roxy in temporary charge as he leaves town to go searching for something. Reggie's science experiment pits her parents against one another.
| 24 | 10 | "Death Defying" | David Grossman | Karl Gajdusek | September 26, 2004 | 210 |
After George loses her virginity to, and then does not hear from, Trip, she spurns every male who crosses her path. Feeling quite the opposite, Daisy reaps a biker at a local bar, where she meets and makes sparks with smarmy TV producer Ray Summers (Eric McCormack), which makes Mason jealous. Rube travels to a vital statistics office in a small town to get information on some people from his past. Reggie meddles in Joy's dating life and lies to her father about Joy's well-being.
| 25 | 11 | "Ashes to Ashes" | Michael Fresco | Mona Mansour & Anna C. Miller | October 3, 2004 | 211 |
After George helps a homeless man die with an identity, she learns the cost of getting too involved in her work when she tries to pass herself off as a relative. Meanwhile, Daisy performs as a bar temptress on Ray's reality TV show. Mason is disgusted by Daisy's behavior and questions his attraction to her. Reggie finally makes a friend, a Goth girl who's organizing a séance.
| 26 | 12 | "Forget Me Not" | Brad Turner | Story by : John Masius & Stephen Godchaux; Teleplay by : Stephen Godchaux & Bridget Carpenter | October 10, 2004 | 212 |
George gets stuck in a hospital when she cannot get an Alzheimer-plagued soul to acknowledge her own death. In need of money, Joy seeks temp work at Happy Time, where she finds out more information from Delores about the short time George worked there. Mason decides to face off with Daisy's boyfriend Ray, in a boxing ring. When Daisy wants to break up with Ray, he responds with violence and Mason jumps in to protect her. Rube seeks help from Penny, a reaper who works as a hospital ward nurse, to find his long-lost daughter.
| 27 | 13 | "Last Call" | Steve Beers | Story by : John Masius & Stephen Godchaux; Teleplay by : Stephen Godchaux & Annie Weisman | October 17, 2004 | 213 |
While George regrets the things she did not accomplish in life, Mason must contemplate his accomplishments in the afterlife as he and Daisy plot to keep Ray's murder a secret. George attends another going-away party at Happy Time for an employee whom she distrusts. Roxy suspects that Daisy is harboring a secret about her missing ex-boyfriend. Reggie searches for her dog, J.D., who has escaped from the yard. George, on her way to see Reggie, finds Charlie instead.
| 28 | 14 | "Always" | Sarah Pia Anderson | Story by : John Masius & Stephen Godchaux; Teleplay by : Stephen Godchaux & Karl Gajdusek | October 24, 2004 | 214 |
After having given away everything he had, a homeless Mason acts badly enough that he's thrown out of Der Waffle Haus by Kiffany. George urges Daisy to allow Mason to crash with them, but Daisy, afraid of Ray's graveling, refuses. Ray's graveling stalks Daisy and Mason and causes an unscheduled death. Rube goes with Penny to visit a very special person on a very special day. Reggie, Joy, and Clancy bury J.D. George discovers her connection to the gravelings is a lot more powerful than anyone thought... unfortunately for Ray.
| 29 | 15 | "Haunted" | James Whitmore Jr. | John Masius & Stephen Godchaux | October 31, 2004 | 215 |
On Halloween, as there is a reaper legend such that reapers can be seen as they are when alive, and since she has been dead only a year and still lives in her hometown, Rube tells George that she has to wear a mask to avoid being recognized by someone she knew. There is serial killer loose who strikes every year on Halloween, and the reapers must work overtime to pick up the souls of the victims. The busy workday cuts into George and Mason's trick-or-treating. Roxy dresses up as Cinderella and Daisy dresses up as a cop. Mason steals candy from neighborhood kids and reaps a small boy. George goes after the serial killer after she suspects he may be someone she remembered from her past. Joy must cajole Reggie into the Halloween spirit following a session with a psychologist. Joy and Reggie pay a late night visit to George's grave—and so does George.

== Home media ==
| Season | DVD release dates | | |
| Season | Region 1 | Region 2 | Region 4 |
|---|---|---|---|
| 1 | June 15, 2004 | June 20, 2005 | July 12, 2005 |
| 2 | June 19, 2005 | April 16, 2007 | July 18, 2007 |
