= Dan Peres =

American magazine editor

Dan Peres (born October 14, 1971) is an American writer, editor, and media personality. He is best known for his tenure as the editor-in-chief of Details magazine from 2000 to 2015. During his time at Details, Peres established the magazine as a leading authority on men's fashion, grooming, and lifestyle.

== Early life and education ==
Dan Peres grew up in Baltimore, later attending New York University (NYU) where he graduated with degrees in Journalism and American History. While in college, he was an editor at the student newspaper Washington Square News, worked as a copy boy at The New York Times, and later as a research assistant at Esquire.

== Career ==
=== W Magazine ===
Peres spent nine years at W magazine. He worked his way from Assistant Editor to European Editor, overseeing W's bureaus in Paris (where he lived for three years), London, and Milan.

=== Details Magazine ===
Peres became editor of Details in 2000 after the magazine was relaunched. Since then, the magazine has won two ASME Awards for Design and earned several other nominations, including General Excellence. In 2003, Advertising Age named Details as an A-List Magazine and MIN magazine included Peres as one of its "21 Most Intriguing People" of the year. He has brought such writers and columnists as Michael Chabon, Anderson Cooper, Matt McAllester, Simon Dumenco, and Rick Moody to the magazine, along with top-tier photographers like Norman Jean Roy, Matthias Vriens-McGrath, Michael Thompson, and Steven Klein. In 2007, Peres authored Details Men's Style Manual: The Ultimate Guide for Making Your Clothes Work for You, published by Gotham Books. For the magazine's September 2011 publication, Peres commissioned Ashton Kutcher to guest-edit Details’ first ever Social Issue, which lives on multiple online platforms.

=== Gawker ===
In March 2019, Peres was announced as Gawker's editor-in-chief for their relaunch but was laid off in July 2019.

=== Author of As Needed for Pain ===
In February 2020, Harper, an imprint of HarperCollins, published Peres' memoir, As Needed for Pain, in which he detailed his addiction to vicodin and other opioids until he cleaned up in 2007.

=== Ad Age & Modern Healthcare ===
In July 2020, Peres was named as the editor-in-chief of Ad Age. In October 2021, Peres's position at Ad Age was elevated to associate publisher of the brand. In June 2022, Peres was named president of Ad Age, and retained his position as editor-in-chief. In January 2023, Crain Communications named Peres president of Modern Healthcare.

== Personal life ==
Dan Peres was married to Australian actress Sarah Wynter. The couple split in 2014 after having three children.
