= Dead Like Me =

American comedy-drama television series (2003–2004)

- Genre: Dark comedy; Comedy drama; Fantasy
- Created by: Bryan Fuller
- Starring: Ellen Muth; Laura Harris; Callum Blue; Jasmine Guy; Cynthia Stevenson; Mandy Patinkin
- Narrated by: Ellen Muth
- Theme music composer: Stewart Copeland
- Country of origin: United States
- Original language: English
- No. of seasons: 2
- No. of episodes: 29 (list of episodes)

Production
- Executive producers: Bryan Fuller; John Masius; Tom Spezialy; Stephen Godchaux
- Production locations: Vancouver, British Columbia
- Running time: 40–50 minutes 74 minutes ("Pilot")
- Production companies: John Masius Productions; MGM Television

Original release
- Network: Showtime
- Release: June 27, 2003 – October 31, 2004

Related
- Dead like Me: Life After Death

Dead Like Me is an American comedy-drama television series starring Ellen Muth and Mandy Patinkin as grim reapers who reside and work in Seattle, Washington. Filmed in Vancouver, British Columbia, the show was created by Bryan Fuller for the Showtime cable network, where it ran for two seasons (2003–04). Fuller left the show five episodes into the first season because of creative differences; creative direction was taken over by executive producers John Masius and Stephen Godchaux. A direct-to-DVD film titled Dead like Me: Life After Death was released on February 17, 2009.

Eighteen-year-old Georgia "George" Lass (Ellen Muth) is the show's protagonist and narrator. George dies early in the pilot episode and becomes one of the "undead", a "grim reaper". George soon learns a reaper's job is to remove the souls of people, preferably just before they die, and escort them until they move on to the afterlife. George's death leaves behind her mother (Cynthia Stevenson) and the rest of her family.

The show explores the experiences of a small team of such reapers, as well as the changes in George and her family as they deal with George's death.

== Series overview ==
=== Introduction ===
The first scene of the pilot episode introduces an origin-of-death myth where at the dawn of time, "god (lower-case g)" was busy with creation and gave Toad a clay jar containing death which Toad promised to guard. Frog begged Toad to let him hold the jar, something to which Toad finally agreed. An excited Frog juggled the jar and finally dropped it, shattering it on the ground. When it broke open, death got out.

=== Main plot ===
Georgia Lass is aloof and emotionally distant from her family and shies away from her life. After dropping out of college, she takes a temp job through Happy Time Temporary Services. During her lunch break on her first day, she is hit and killed by a toilet seat falling from the deorbiting Mir space station. She is soon informed that, rather than moving on to the "great beyond", she will become a grim reaper in the External Influence Division, collecting souls of people who die in accidents (many of which have a Rube Goldberg–style complexity), and homicides. Each reaper has a secret quota of souls; once the quota is met, the reaper moves on to another realm and the last soul reaped then takes their job collecting souls.

In Season 1, George has trouble adjusting to her circumstances – collecting souls while holding down a day job. By Season 2, she has mostly adjusted to her new role, with few unresolved issues with her life and her afterlife.

George's family is struggling to deal with her death. Her father, Clancy (Greg Kean), has an affair that affects his marriage to Joy (Cynthia Stevenson). Her sister, Reggie (Britt McKillip), acts out – stealing toilet seats from neighbors and school and hanging them on a tree – until her mother sends her to therapy. Reggie clings to the belief that George visits her, but she is starting to lie to cover this up. At the start of Season 2, the family begins to break apart as Joy and Clancy divorce.

All of the main characters have issues with their life after death, but they cope with it in different ways: Mason (Callum Blue) resorts to alcohol and drugs; Daisy (Laura Harris) puts on a veneer of perkiness; and Roxy (Jasmine Guy) is physically and verbally aggressive. Rube (Mandy Patinkin) and George are more straightforward about their sadness.

=== Bryan Fuller's departure ===
Bryan Fuller left early in the first season because of conflicts with MGM Television, including disagreement over major script and storyline cuts he considered important to the main theme. He stated that the "lack of professionalism...made it really difficult. It was like being at war. They were constantly trying to strong arm me. It was the worst experience of my life." According to Fuller, Showtime canceled the show due to "a loss of quality and a sense the problems would continue." Actress Rebecca Gayheart also departed the show after the series' fifth episode.

== Characters ==
=== Reapers ===
Dead Like Me cast photo showing reapers George, Rube, Daisy, Roxy, and Mason.

- Georgia "George" Lass (Ellen Muth): (1985–2003) The show's protagonist, an 18-year-old college dropout. In addition to being a grim reaper she has a day job at Happy Time Temporary Services, under the assumed name "Millie Hagen". She was killed on June 27, 2003, when a toilet seat from the de-orbiting Mir space station fell on her. Because of this, she is known among the reapers as "Toilet Seat Girl", a fact which earns her instant recognition/respect for dying in such a bizarre way.
- Rube John Sofer (Mandy Patinkin): (1876 – c. 1926) The head of the group of reapers. He is responsible for passing out reaping assignments, nearly always on yellow post-it notes. He becomes a father figure for George (whom he calls "Peanut") in her grim-reaping afterlife, and had a daughter named Rose ("Rosie"), whom he had also called "Peanut". The manner of his death was not revealed, but in one episode his name and picture are seen on an old "Wanted" poster alleging that he was a bank robber. Because of this, it is believed that he died at the hands of the police (i.e. shoot-out or execution).
- Mason (Callum Blue): (1939–1966) A British drug addict, alcoholic and thief, but a likable person. He acts as an "older brother" figure to George, and is attracted to Daisy, which Daisy begins to reciprocate later in the series. He is originally from London, and died in 1966 by drilling a hole in his head to achieve a "permanent high". He's considered the least responsible of "Rube's Post-it Crew" and often makes gaffes, cuts his reaps close, or is drunk or high much of the time.
- Roxy Harvey (Jasmine Guy): (before 1960–1982) A strong-willed, independent woman. Her day job is initially as a meter maid, but she later becomes a police officer. She was strangled to death by a jealous roommate in 1982 with leg warmers, which Roxy had invented. Although she is generally seen as tough and no-nonsense, she has a softer side, shown in "Reapercussions" after saving the life of J. H. Arnold.
- Betty Rhomer (Rebecca Gayheart): (1899–1926) A confident, well-adjusted reaper in the first five episodes. She keeps Polaroids of each of the souls she reaps, in department store shopping bags organized by personality type. She refers to this as her signature, as a way to separate herself from "the whole cloak and sickle thing." George begins to bond with her early in the first season, but she "hitches a ride" into the afterlife with one of the souls George had reaped and is never seen again. She died in 1926 while cliff-diving with her fiancé. In a similar fashion to the reaping of George, though Rube did not personally reap Betty, he did collect her soul, as shown in the season 1 episode "Reaping Havoc". (Though she refers later to having been alive in 1927, that is presumably an error in her memory since we are shown her tombstone.)
- Daisy Adair (Laura Harris): (before 1915–1938) A spoiled actress who often tells stories about her (alleged) sexual escapades with classic film stars. She died on December 13, 1938, of asphyxiation/smoke inhalation in Marietta, Georgia, though she originally claimed this occurred on the set of Gone with the Wind. Her last thought before she died was, "Why has no one ever loved me?" Daisy is sent from New York City to Seattle in episode six as a replacement for Betty. She is traumatically affected by the violent deaths of defenseless women by abusive men, and although Roxy yelled at her for tampering with a crime scene after such a reap, Daisy explained to Mason that she had a sister who (presumably) died that way. At the end of the second season, Ray – a criminal mortal Daisy begins a relationship with – believes her to be "bad luck charm" after witnessing several people die around her. Ray himself is later killed in self defense by Mason and his soul is transformed into a graveling as he was not a planned reap. Daisy states that she has "seen it before" and that it's "happening again." Daisy is recognized in the last episode by an elderly man in Der Waffle Haus while she is dressed as a police officer for Halloween; as stated in that episode, on Halloween, all reapers look as they did when alive.

=== George's family ===
- Reggie Lass (Britt McKillip): George's younger sister. Though George ignored her while she was alive, Reggie is very much affected by the death of her sister. She believes that George's ghost still roams about the city and visits their home from time to time – technically, she is right. Due to her eccentric, seemingly pathological way of grieving her sister's death, Reggie is placed in psychiatric therapy.
- Joy Lass (Cynthia Stevenson): George's mother has a pathological fear of balloons and who hates the word "moist" because she thinks "it sounds pornographic". She likes to have order, rules, and control in her life. Other characters in the show, such as Joy's own mother, believe that her obsession with control is how she copes with denial of her own out-of-control life, her daughter George's death, her younger daughter's rather unconventional style of grieving over George's death, and her divorce from her husband. In the episode where her mother comes to visit, however, it becomes clear Joy's problems stem more from the chaotic lifestyle and abandonment issues of her own childhood.
- Clancy Lass (Greg Kean): George's father. He is an English professor at the University of Washington. His relationship with Joy begins to deteriorate seriously after George's death. He has an affair with one of his Shakespeare-class students (A.J. Cook), which becomes the final death knell to the marriage. In the pilot it was suggested, by an overly-long hug, that his affair was with a young man but this homosexual thread was dropped and the student confirmed to be female in later episodes.

=== Happy Time Temporary Services ===
- Delores Herbig, as in, as she says, "her big brown eyes" (Christine Willes): George's boss. Delores disliked George, but becomes friends with "Millie", for whom she becomes something of a maternal figure, offering advice and support, and on one occasion bailing "Millie" out of jail. Delores is optimistic, dynamic, and motivated; she has an active Internet presence through various social and dating sites, and runs a website (her home life on webcam) called 'Getting Things Done With Delores'. Occasionally, Delores will try to empathize with George by revealing startling facts about her past – including a cocaine habit, tattoos, and "all those restraining orders". She has a very elderly cat named Murray.
- Crystal Smith (Crystal Dahl): Happy Time's mysterious receptionist whose Happy Time record indicates that she speaks several languages and previously served as a special forces operative in Southeast Asia. Crystal once helped the reapers organize into computer files a collection of souls' last thoughts. She also dressed as a grim reaper for Halloween. She is also seen to steal great amounts of Post-it notes (like those used to notify reapers of their assignments) from Happy Time.

=== Miscellaneous characters ===
- Kiffany (Patricia Idlette): The reapers' usual server at "Der Waffle Haus". She is a quiet observer of the group, and takes their individual idiosyncrasies in stride. She also seems able to see their true faces, as on Halloween (despite their having "returned" to life appearances), Kiffany is able to recognize and interact with all of them without surprise – even newly dead George (spoiling the idea that only reapers so old as to be unrecognizable get their 'true faces'). Some of the characters believe her to be psychic.
- Charlie (Spencer Achtymichuk): The youngest Reaper George knows is a child reaper, whom she initially meets in a vet's waiting room when Delores' cat Murray has a health scare. Child reapers reap animals, and Charlie is seen reaping a komodo dragon in Reggie's school, and later her dog, J.D. (Just Dog). He died after being struck by a drunk driver's car seven years previously, and lives on the streets.
- Penny (Yeardley Smith): The oldest Reaper George meets is Penny, who died during the sinking of the Titanic and whom Mason calls "older than forever and a day." Penny is one of Rube's old Post-It Crew in External Influences Division before she was transferred to a cushier gig in Long Term Care, where she works as a nurse in a nursing home. She says it is less hectic because everyone has a name tag, and no one is going anywhere. Mason and Roxy both greet Penny with affection upon her giving Rube a courtesy heads-up that his daughter, unbeknownst to him living in a long-term care center, was to be her reap that day. He accompanied Penny to say goodbye to Rose in "Always", and sang his dying daughter to sleep with the lullaby he had sung to her on the day of her childhood that he left and then died.

== Mythology ==
=== Grim reapers ===
In the world of Dead Like Me, grim reapers do not wear black cloaks or carry scythes (cloaks and scythes are only featured during the opening credits, for humorous effect), but their role remains traditional: they remove the souls of the living shortly before death and escort them into their afterlife. One becomes a reaper by being the last soul collected when one's own reaper meets their secret quota.

In the series, Death has a list of who is scheduled to die and when. This list is delivered to the head of each group by a shadowy figure (when the delivery is made to Rube's apartment; it is shown that the delivery is made by an actual shadow, with the list of names becoming corporeal only when it is delivered). The head of each group then gives each reaper a non-transferable assignment to collect a particular soul or souls. Completing that assignment is often difficult for the reapers, who receive only the first (and sometimes middle) initial and last name of the person about to die, the location, and estimated time of death (ETD). If a reaper refuses to take a soul at their place of death and the person somehow survives their appointed time, the soul will "wither and die and rot inside" them. If a reaper does not take a soul and the person does die, the soul remains trapped in the body and is subject to extremely traumatic experiences such as witnessing the autopsy of their own body. Deaths can be at least temporarily postponed without risk to the soul's well-being by interfering well in advance of the time of death; thus reapers would not be interfering with the events that lead to the death. However, this may have unintended consequences, such as other people dying because of actions taken by the person who should have died.

Reapers have a physical body and may interact with the living and the dead. Besides collecting souls, reapers have powers to remain ageless, heal extremely quickly (George once severed her middle finger, but was able to reattach it by just putting it back in place, while Mason has sustained what should have been fatal damage on multiple occasions, such as being shot and hit by a car), drink alcohol without suffering a hangover (see "Gravelings"), and forcibly pull a soul from a living body and put it back (as seen done by Roxy in Episode 9 "Sunday Mornings"). When seen by the living, reapers' physical appearances are different from when they were alive to those who knew them, except on Halloween when the living see them as they were in life, and fellow reapers always see their original appearances. Although George is seen by her family and Delores as "Millie," Rube's image was recognizable by a records clerk in a wanted poster seen while Rube and the clerk were doing some research into his past life. Laura Boddington portrays lead character George's undead appearance in the TV series, with Jennifer Rae Westley playing her in the later film.

The passage into the afterlife is shown as a brightly lit scene towards which the newly deceased is drawn. The portal is unique to each soul: for a child, it may be a wonderful carnival, but for a yoga master, it may be a Deva beckoning from within a Divine Lotus. Souls cannot be forced to enter the portals, so part of the reapers' job is to convince them to do so.

Groups of reapers are organized into "divisions" according to various causes of death. Generally, reapers are assigned to a division based upon their own cause of death; Mason tells George in a deleted scene that most of the members of the Plague Division died because of the Plague. In addition to Rube's "external influence" team, the three other divisions mentioned in the series are Circulatory Systems Division, the very uneventful and bored reapers of the Plague Division (who spend much of their time playing bocce ball) and the Natural Causes (Old Age) Division mentioned in the 27th and 28th episodes (according to the running order). (In the pilot episode, the viewer is led to believe that the Plague Division members have been reapers for centuries and will be unable to meet their quota, as plague deaths have become so rare.) While the members of Rube's team of reapers are instructed to never reap animals, both George and Reggie do meet a child reaper who reaps the souls of animals — suggesting that there may be a fifth division that exists for this purpose. The teams are organized into jurisdictions of geographical areas, with several teams associated with different causes of death operating within one area. It is not known how much geographical area a single division covers, but the reapers in the series seem to cover only a limited area in Seattle and King County, Washington; with reaper Daisy Adair transferring from the SoHo area of New York City.

=== Gravelings ===
Gravelings underwater

In the show, reapers do not actually kill the living. Instead, deaths are arranged by "gravelings".

Gravelings are mischievous gremlin-like creatures that cause the accidents and mishaps (in the form of Rube Goldberg machine scenarios) that kill people. The living generally cannot see them, though in the episode "Reaper Madness", a person with schizophrenia was able to, although Rube refused to believe that was possible. Reapers can see and interact with them to some extent: Daisy once shushed a graveling; Rube yelled, "Get outta here!" once when seeing gravelings desecrating a cemetery statue; and George once chased several angry gravelings around her apartment. Although gravelings seem to be self-aware and recognize the reapers, they do not communicate verbally with them, and talk to each other in a hushed and unintelligible babble; other times they growl or hiss.

According to the episode "Vacation", gravelings are given one day off every few years. Despite the holiday, most reapers are disturbed by their lack of manners and behavior. During this time they display the odd habit of stacking objects into precarious, humanoid towers.

In the episode "Reapercussions" (Season 1, Episode 4), it is noted that if a reaper interferes with and prevents a scheduled death, a "hunting season" will be declared by the gravelings, who will pester the reaper until that soul is taken and order is restored. Some of the reapers, including George, Roxy, Mason, and Daisy, are plagued by the wrath of gravelings throughout the series.

A graveling rose from the body of Ray in "Forget Me Not" (Season 2, Episode 12) following his murder at the hands of a reaper. This graveling retained Ray's mind or some other connection to his life, as it stayed close to Daisy and George's house (where Ray was killed) and expressed anger toward Daisy and Mason for Ray's death. It was also responsible for an unscheduled death at one of Daisy's reaps. Later, in the episode "Always" (Season 2, Episode 14), the graveling was reaped by George, upon which it turned to dust.

In the episode "The Shallow End" (Season 2, Episode 4) a child George in a flashback sees gravelings as she sinks into a swimming pool, with the gravelings appearing to hesitate from claiming her life (although it is not clear whether she actually saw the gravelings), and again in "Haunted" (Season 2, Episode 15) George recalls a Halloween afternoon when as a young girl she saw a graveling scurrying around in the background behind a man who, after she became a reaper, she realizes is a serial killer.

=== Creation ===
Viewers are told that in the beginning, god created death and, not knowing what to do with it, kept it in a sealed urn. Toad was asked by god to watch the urn but Frog pestered Toad into giving it to him. Frog proceeded to juggle the jar from foot to foot and accidentally dropped it, thus letting death out, whereby everything from that point had to die. George is frequently shown caring for an albino Argentine horned frog (also known as a Pacman frog) identical to the one shown as Toad during the opening narration.

== Home media releases and streaming ==
=== DVD releases ===
Season	Release dates	Includes
Season 1	Region 1: June 15, 2004; Region 2: June 20, 2005; Region 4: July 12, 2005	All 14 episodes of the first season.; Pilot episode commentary by members of the cast.; Thirty minutes of deleted scenes.; Two behind-the-scenes featurettes.; Photo gallery.
Season 2	Region 1: June 19, 2005; Region 2: April 16, 2007; Region 4: July 18, 2007	All 15 episodes of the second season.; Deleted scenes.; Behind-the-scenes featurettes.; Photo gallery.

=== Direct-to-DVD film ===
On April 18, 2007, MGM announced it was developing several direct-to-DVD movies and sequels. First among them was a new film based on Dead Like Me.

The movie is set five years after the first series episode. The movie's release date was originally set for the summer of 2008, then changed to February 17, 2009. Before its general release, it had a television debut on January 16, 2009, on SuperChannel in Canada. In the movie, the role of Daisy is played by Sarah Wynter. Rube does not appear (he reportedly had moved on), but is mentioned by the characters; the new leader of the reapers is Cameron Kane, played by Henry Ian Cusick.

=== Soundtrack ===
La-La Land Records released a soundtrack containing the original score to the series composed by Stewart Copeland on May 25, 2010, as a limited release of 3000 units.

== Reception ==
=== Critical response ===
On Rotten Tomatoes, the first season has an approval rating of 69% with an average score of 6.3 out of 10 based on 16 reviews. The website's critical consensus reads, "Dead Like Me is a required [sic] (after)taste, but the series' acidic wit and wry observations about the simple pleasures of life and death overcome the deficit in likable characters." The second season holds an approval rating of 100% with an average score of 7.5/10 based on 7 reviews.

=== Awards and nominations ===
Year	Group	Award	Result	For
2004	Academy of Science Fiction, Fantasy and Horror Films	Best Actress in a Television Series	Nominated	Ellen Muth
2004	Academy of Science Fiction, Fantasy and Horror Films	Best Syndicated/Cable Television Series	Nominated	
2004	Emmy Awards	Outstanding Music Composition for a Series (Dramatic Underscore)	Nominated	Episode: "Pilot"
2004	Emmy Awards	Outstanding Special Visual Effects for a Series	Nominated	Episode: "Pilot"
2004	International Horror Guild Award	Best Television	Nominated	
2004	Satellite Award	Best Performance by an Actress in a Series, Drama	Nominated	Ellen Muth
2005	Academy of Science Fiction, Fantasy and Horror Films	Best Syndicated/Cable Television Series	Nominated	
2005	NAACP Image Award	Outstanding Supporting Actress in a Drama Series	Nominated	Jasmine Guy

=== Ratings ===
The show's complete ratings were not released, though executives had claimed to at least one reporter that Dead Like Me had ratings three times Showtime's primetime average. This contrasts with the network's statement that the ratings were not high enough for a third season. The ratings for the series premiere were 1.11 million, a record for a Showtime series premiere that was not beaten until the premiere of Shameless seven years later.
