= Get to the Heart: The Barbara Mandrell Story =

1997 television film

- Promotional poster
- Genre: Biography
- Based on: Get to the Heart: My Story by Barbara Mandrell
- Teleplay by: Linda Bergman
- Directed by: Jerry London
- Starring: Maureen McCormick; Dwight Schultz; Greg Kean; Lisa Blount
- Music by: Dennis McCarthy
- Country of origin: United States
- Original language: English

Production
- Executive producers: Tom Patricia; Barbara Mandrell; Ken Dudney
- Producers: Linda Bergman; James A. Dennett
- Cinematography: James Glennon
- Editor: Michael Brown
- Running time: 91 minutes
- Production companies: Mandalay Television; Hallmark Entertainment

Original release
- Network: CBS
- Release: September 28, 1997

Get to the Heart: The Barbara Mandrell Story is a 1997 biographical television film directed by Jerry London from a teleplay by Linda Bergman, based on American country music singer Barbara Mandrell's 1990 autobiography Get to the Heart: My Story. The film chronicles the life and career of Mandrell, from her early years in her family's band to her rise to country music fame, and the 1984 car accident that nearly ended her career. It stars Maureen McCormick in the title role, along with Dwight Schultz, Greg Kean, and Lisa Blount in supporting roles.

Get to the Heart was produced by Mandalay Television in association with Hallmark Entertainment, and was shot in Los Angeles in and around May 1997. In the film, McCormick plays Mandrell from age 14 through 38, and the actress prepared for the role by reading Mandrell's autobiography and watching tapes of the country singer. McCormick also did research on brain trauma so as to better understand Mandrell's experience in the aftermath of the accident. Although credited as an executive producer, Mandrell said she had little involvement in the making of the film due to her busy performance schedule.

The film premiered on CBS on September 28, 1997. It was watched by 19.9 million total viewers, making it the 13th most-watched prime time broadcast of its respective week. Reviewers found McCormick's performance lacking and criticized the script for glossing over parts of Mandrell's life story.

== Plot ==
Growing up in Texas—and later California—in the 1950s, Barbara Mandrell's musical talent and love for performing is apparent from an early age. While helping her father Irby at a music store, a young Mandrell's impromptu performance on a steel guitar catches the eye of country music guitarist Joe Maphis, who invites her to perform in his shows in Las Vegas and Los Angeles. However, Mandrell's foray into show business is cut short as the constant travel proves too much for her parents and younger sisters. Over the years, the now-teenage Mandrell continues performing locally in her family's band. Mandrell and the band's drummer Ken Dudney fall in love, but Irby disapproves of their relationship due to their age difference. Meanwhile, Dudney enlists as a pilot in the United States Navy. Seeing Mandrell pine over Dudney, Irby eventually accepts their relationship and the two get married in 1967. The couple move to a Navy base in Whidbey Island, Washington, where Mandrell intends to settle down and give up performing for good. While Dudney is away on military deployment, Mandrell and Irby take a trip to the Grand Ole Opry in Nashville, Tennessee, where Mandrell realizes she still loves performing and resolves to pursue her dream of making it in the music industry.

With Irby as her manager, Mandrell begins performing in local nightclubs in Nashville. She catches the attention of a record executive and is signed to a major label. Just as her career is starting to take off, Mandrell and Dudney find out they are expecting their first child, Matthew, and Dudney leaves the Navy to support Mandrell. With her family's help, Mandrell tours the country and has a string of hit singles in the 1970s. Mandrell is in the middle of a tour when Irby has a heart attack; he insists she does not put her career on hold on his behalf. Mandrell's success continues even as she and Dudney have their second child, Jaime, and she becomes one of the biggest stars in country music, winning the 1980 Country Music Association Award for Entertainer of the Year. That same year, Mandrell and her family move to California where she has been offered her own show on network television. Despite some pushback from the network executives, her show is a ratings hit. However, Mandrell struggles to balance her career and family, with her hectic schedule often keeping her away from her children. Moreover, her health suffers as she overworks herself, and a worried Dudney convinces Mandrell to quit the show. Mandrell continues to record music and tour the country, even as she misses her family who are back in Nashville.

In 1984, while on a break from touring, Mandrell and her children are involved in a car accident. They survive but the accident leaves Mandrell with severe injuries including head trauma, causing her to have memory loss and mood swings. Depressed and in constant pain, Mandrell becomes reclusive, prompting bad press and media speculation. Her family tries to be supportive, but an embittered Mandrell takes her anger out on them. After an intervention by Dudney, Mandrell realizes she has been pushing her loved ones away and reconciles with them. Mandrell and Dudney have their third child Nathan soon after. With the encouragement of her family, Mandrell overcomes her fears about returning to the stage, and the film ends with her big comeback performance in Los Angeles in 1986.

== Cast ==
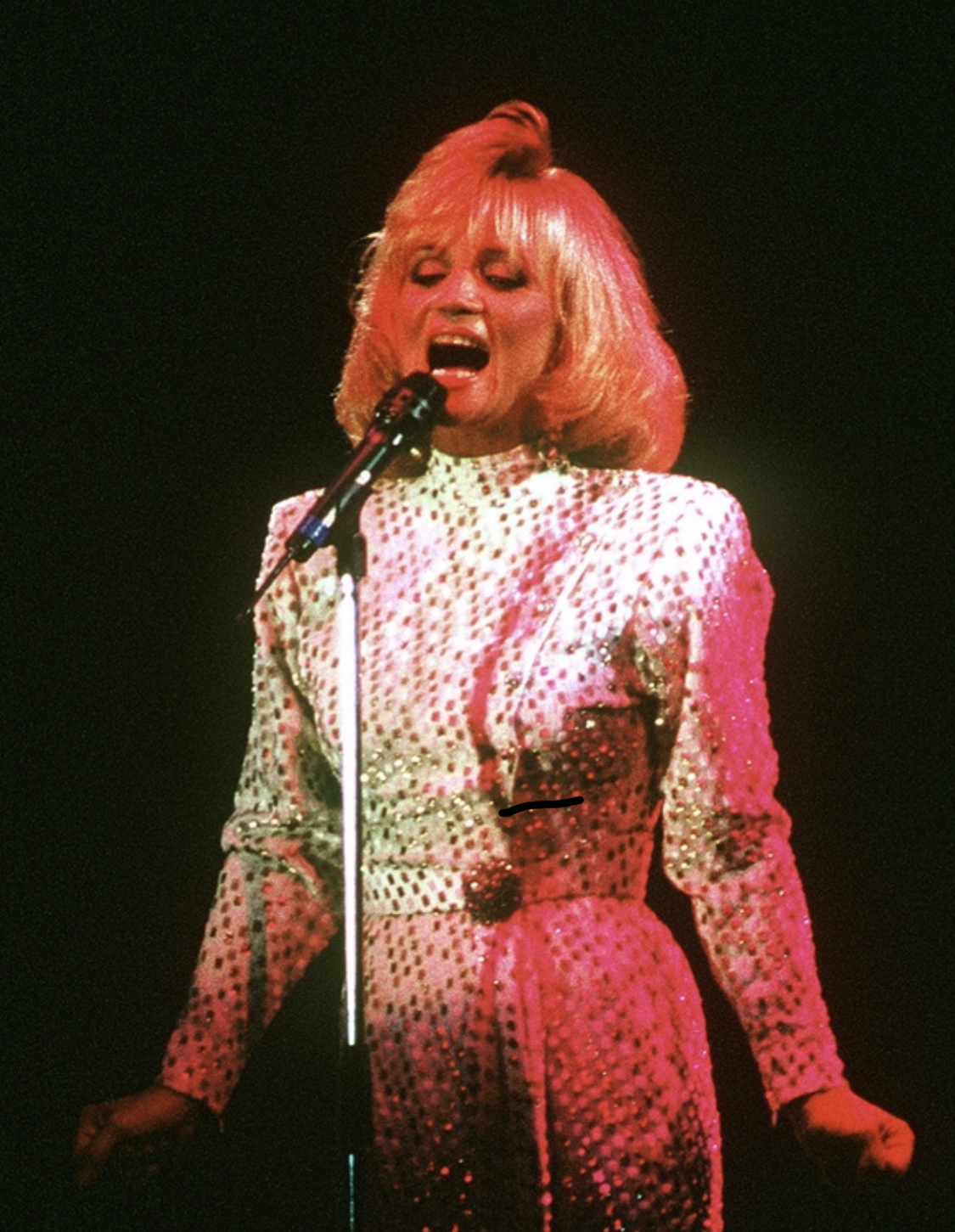
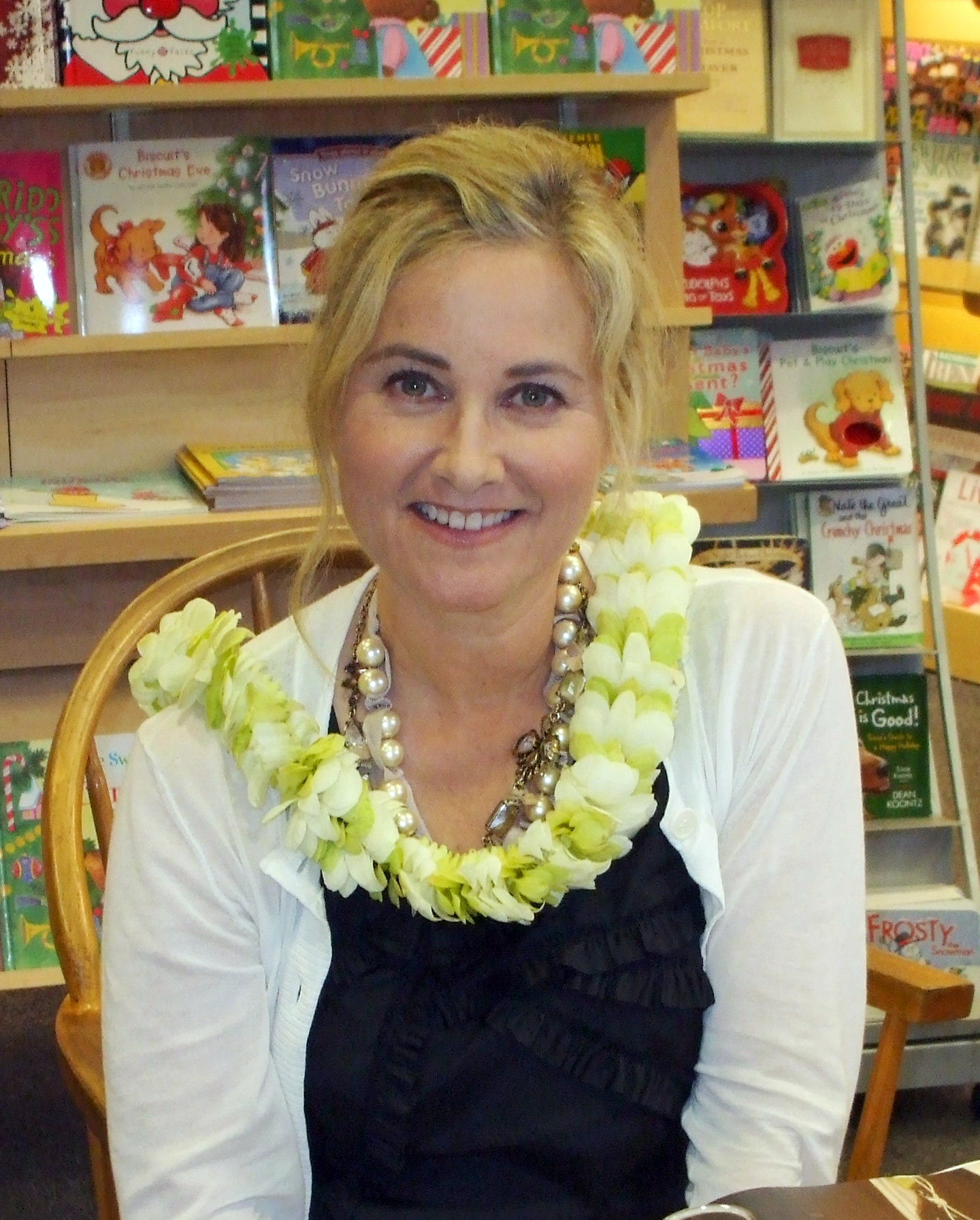
Barbara Mandrell (left, 1991), who also appears in the film, is portrayed by Maureen McCormick (right, 2009).
- Maureen McCormick as Barbara Mandrell
- Dwight Schultz as Irby Mandrell
- Greg Kean as Ken Dudney
- Lisa Blount as Mary Mandrell
- Lindsey Haun as teenage Barbara Mandrell
- Jaime Nicole Dudney as Irlene Mandrell
- Portia Dawson as Louise Mandrell
- Kim Lankford as JoAnn Berry
- Jesse Littlejohn as Matthew Dudney
- Evan Rachel Wood as Jaime Dudney
- John Doe as Joe Maphis

Barbara Mandrell appears as herself in the opening and closing scenes, while fellow country music singers Dolly Parton and Kenny Rogers also make cameo appearances as themselves.

== Production ==
Get to the Heart is a biography about the life and career of American country music singer Barbara Mandrell. The film was directed by Jerry London and written by Linda Bergman, based on Mandrell's 1990 autobiography Get to the Heart: My Story. It was produced for CBS by Mandalay Television in association with Hallmark Entertainment. Mandrell and her husband Ken Dudney, along with Tom Patricia, served as executive producers. The creative team also included James Glennon (cinematographer), Michael Brown (editor), and Dennis McCarthy (composer).

In April 1997, Maureen McCormick was announced to play the lead role of Mandrell. After a nearly ten-year break from acting, McCormick believed Get to the Heart would be the ideal comeback project and would allow her to showcase her emotional range as an actor. In the film, the actress plays Mandrell from age 14 – when the country singer was starting out in her family's band – to 38 – when a car accident nearly ended her career. McCormick noted that it was "very scary" to portray the life story of someone who was still alive. To prepare for the role, McCormick got to know Mandrell better by visiting the latter while she was performing in Las Vegas. McCormick also read Mandrell's autobiography and watched "countless tapes" of the country singer. Another challenge for McCormick was portraying the recovery process that Mandrell had to undergo after the 1984 car accident left her with traumatic head injuries. The actress researched brain trauma to better understand the process, including watching medical videos and consulting with hospital patients. McCormick lip syncs to Mandrell's songs in the film, which the actress felt was appropriate as she did not think she would have been able to mimic Mandrell's vocals.

Although credited as an executive producer, Mandrell said she had little involvement in the making of the film due to her busy performance schedule. Instead, Mandrell's husband and their daughter Jaime Nicole Dudney, who plays Irlene Mandrell in the film, were more involved behind the scenes. Mandrell initially wanted Jennie Garth for the title role, and was worried that she would not be able to separate McCormick from her previous role in The Brady Bunch, explaining: "[A]t first I thought ... when I see her playing me all I'm going to be able to think about is Marcia Brady." However, she was full of praise for McCormick's performance after seeing an early cut of the film, and found that "not once did [she] think 'Marcia'".

Get to the Heart was shot in Los Angeles in and around May 1997.

== Release and reception ==
Get to the Heart premiered on CBS on September 28, 1997, in the 9:00–11:00 pm time slot. The film earned a national Nielsen rating of 13.6 and was watched by 19.9 million total viewers, making it the 13th most-watched prime time broadcast for the week of September 22 to 28, 1997.

=== Critical response ===
In a review for The Washington Post, Chip Crews found Get to the Heart unconvincing in its depiction of Mandrell's rise to fame, noting that much of the problems the singer faced were glossed over except for the 1984 car accident. Both The Seattle Times' John Voorhees and TV Guide's Susan Stewart felt the film lacked conflict, while The Sydney Morning Herald's Jenny Tabakoff wondered if Mandrell's behind-the-scenes involvement was to blame for the script's idealized depiction of the singer. Voorhees was also critical of McCormick's portrayal of Mandrell, writing that the actress "looks perky but fails to communicate any of the electric personality and the burning desire to perform that made Mandrell a star". Variety's Todd Everett thought the film suffered from Mandrell's one-sided perspective and found the acting generally lackluster, with the exception of Dwight Schultz as Mandrell's father and John Doe as Joe Maphis.

Frank Wooten of The Post and Courier criticized the film as excessively sentimental to the point of being "unintentionally campy", with platitude-filled dialogue and a weak performance from McCormick. The Houston Chronicle's Ann Hodges as well as The Christian Science Monitor's Yvonne Zipp and Lisa Leigh Parney similarly thought McCormick was unconvincing in the lead role, with Hodges noting the "jarring" physical difference between the actress and Mandrell. Zipp and Parney also did not like how Get to the Heart skipped over important events in Mandrell's life, and felt the film ultimately did not do the singer's life story justice. Gail Pennington of the St. Louis Post-Dispatch agreed that McCormick's performance was lacking, but concluded the film "is so earnest and sincere that it's hard to hate".
