= Greg Kean =

Canadian television actor (born 1962)

- Born: Gregory Kean Williams; September 27, 1962 (age 64); Oshawa, Ontario, Canada

Gregory Kean Williams (born September 27, 1962) is a Canadian television actor. He is perhaps best known for his role as Clancy Lass in the television series Dead Like Me.

== Early life ==
Kean was born in Oshawa, Ontario, the son of Dorothy and Rex Williams. He earned an M.F.A. degree from Cornell University.

== Career ==
His first acting role was either a dancing rabbit named "Nibbles" in a grade 5 presentation of the operetta "Snow White and the Seven Dwarfs" or as another bunny in an Easter play, both at Adelaide McLaughlin Public School in Oshawa, Ontario in 1973.

As a stage actor, Kean has been a resident company member of the Alley Theatre in Houston, Texas. He also has worked with the Los Angeles Theater Centre and the New Mexico Rep as well as the first Actors' Equity Association sanctioned production of Tony n' Tina's Wedding in Los Angeles. Kean is also an acting teacher and one of the owners of the William Davis Centre for Actors Study in Vancouver, British Columbia along with Dead Like Me colleague Christine Willes. He is currently teaching drama at Southpointe Academy, a private school located in Tsawwassen, British Columbia.

== Filmography ==
=== Films ===
- Summer Dreams: The Story of the Beach Boys (1990), Brian Wilson
- Baby of the Bride (1991), Nick
- Mother of the Bride (1993), Nick
- Logan's War: Bound by Honor (1998), Chicky Bruno

=== Television ===
- Saved by the Bell (1990), Adam Trask
- Designing Women 7 May 1993 Season 7, Episode 720 "The Lying Game" Eric
- Get to the Heart: The Barbara Mandrell Story (1997), Ken Dudney (TV movie)
- The Chris Isaak Show (2001), Lou
- Andromeda (2002)
- Dead Like Me (2003–2004), Clancy Lass
- Smallville (2004)
- The Dead Zone (2005)
- Black Christmas (2006), Kelli's Father
- The 12 Disasters of Christmas (2012), Sheriff
- The Flash (2015), Laboratory Supervisor
- Legends of Tomorrow (2021), Bert Beeman
