= Christine Willes =

Canadian actress

Christine Willes is a Canadian television, theatre and film actress who is best known for her roles as Delores Herbig on the Showtime comedy-drama Dead Like Me and Gladys the DMV demon on the CW supernatural drama television series Reaper. She is also known for her role as Granny Goodness on the CW series Smallville.

== Career ==
Willes played the recurring role of Agent Karen E. Kosseff, a government counselor, on the TV show The X-Files. She also appears in a minor recurring role on the show Reaper on The CW, as Gladys, a demon from Hell who works in the DMV. She was nominated in the 2009 Leo Awards in the category of Best Supporting Performance by a Female in a Dramatic Series for that role. Like her Dead Like Me co-star Callum Blue, she was cast as the villain Granny Goodness on The CW's Smallville's tenth and final season (Blue appeared in the previous season as Zod). She also had a small role in the award-winning film Trick r Treat starring Anna Paquin, which also featured another Dead Like Me co-star, Britt McKillip. She also played Vera Kane on CW series the 100.

Christine appeared as Madam Lazar in Catherine Hardwicke's production of Red Riding Hood.

She has won three Jessie Richardson Theatre Awards, and both produced and starred in Jasmina Reza's The Unexpected Man. She directed Metamorphoses at Pacific Theatre in August 2008, and played Clara Epp in Touchstone Theatre's 2010 World Premiere of Sally Stubb's Herr Beckmann's People.

Willes had a recurring role as Patty Deckler in the third series of the drama series Mistresses in 2015.

== Filmography ==
=== Film ===
Year	Title	Role	Notes
1996	Big Bully	Teacher - 1970	
1998	I'll Be Home for Christmas	Race Official	
2000	MVP: Most Valuable Primate	Lady #2	
2002	Bang Bang You're Dead	Sandwich Woman	
2004	Jiminy Glick in Lalawood	Arlene Sheehy	
2006	The Wicker Man	Sister Violet	
2007	Trick 'r Treat	Mrs. Henderson	
2009	Dead like Me: Life After Death	Delores Herbig	
2011	Red Riding Hood	Madame Lazar	
2011	Sucker Punch	Reception Nurse / Designer	
2013	Horns	Receptionist	
2013	Lawrence & Holloman	Holloman's Mother	
2014	Kid Cannabis	Female Border Guard	
2014	If I Stay	Nurse Davis	
2014	Two 4 One	Dr. Sharp	
2014	Feed the Gods	Baba	
2014	Mountain Men	Marion Pollard	
2015	Fifty Shades of Grey	WSU Grad Speaker / Reader	
2015	The Driftless Area	Concerned Woman	
2018	The Professor	Widow #1	
2019	A Dog's Way Home	Leslie	

=== Television ===
Year	Title	Role	Notes
1989	21 Jump Street	Nurse	Episode: "Woolly Bullies"
1992	Shame	Claire	Television film
1992	Child of Rage	Teacher	Television film
1994	Moment of Truth: To Walk Again	Balboa nurse	Television film
1995	Serving in Silence	Col. Angela Webber	Television film
1995–2016	The X-Files	Karen Kosseff / Sister Mary	4 episodes
1996	A Kidnapping in the Family	Ellen	Television film
1996	For Hope	Nurse Start	Television film
1997	The Outer Limits	Nurse Yvette	Episode: "Dark Rain"
1997	Dad's Week Off	Alice	Television film
1998	Outrage	Judge	Television film
1997	Cupid	Doctor #1	Episode: "Pilot"
1998–1999	Mercy Point	Nurse Molly Tobitt	7 episodes
1998–1999	Honey, I Shrunk the Kids	Mrs. Gotteramerding	5 episodes
1999	Silver Wolf	Mrs. Gates	Television film
1999	Hope Island	Mrs. Salvo	Episode: "It Takes a Voyage to Learn"
2000	Runaway Virus	Tall Woman	Television film
2000	Sole Survivor	Mercy Ealing	Television film
2001	So Weird	Lorraine	Episode: "The Muse"
2002	Dark Angel	Church Lady	Episode: "Freak Nation"
2003–2004	Dead Like Me	Delores Herbig	26 episodes
2004	Kingdom Hospital	Emma Warburton	Episode: "The West Side of Midnight"
2004	The Book of Ruth	DeeDee	Television film
2005	FBI: Negotiator	Mrs. Branch	Television film
2006	A Little Thing Called Murder	Loretta	Television film
2006	Psych	Ms. Foote	Episode: "Spellingg Bee"
2006	Four Extraordinary Women	Dr. Warner	Television film
2006	To Have and to Hold	McNary	Television film
2007	Passion's Web	DA Lockwood	Television film
2007	Write & Wrong	Marty's Assistant	Television film
2007	Flash Gordon	Edie Atkins	Episode: "Life Source"
2007	Snowglobe	Joy	Television film
2007–2009	Reaper	Gladys	15 episodes
2008	Nightmare at the End of the Hall	Robin	Television film
2009	Defying Gravity	Dr. Greer	2 episodes
2009	The Good Wife	Laine	Episode: "Pilot"
2009	Sorority Wars	Mary Lee Snow	Television film
2010–2011	Smallville	Granny Goodness	3 episodes
2011	To the Mat	Cecile Slocum	Television film
2011	Possessing Piper Rose	Ruth	Television film
2011	InSecurity	Alex's Mother	2 episodes
2012	The Factory	Realtor	Television film
2012	The 12 Disasters of Christmas	Miriam	Television film
2012–2013	Emily Owens, M.D.	E.R. Nurse	8 episodes
2014	Signed, Sealed, Delivered	Vivian Lasseter	Episode: "Time to Start Livin'"
2014	The 100	Vera Kane	3 episodes
2014	Zapped	Principal Mumford	Television film
2014	The Christmas Secret	Gloria	Television film
2014	Til Death Do Us Part	Liz	Television film
2015	I Do, I Do, I Do	Margaret Lorenzo	Television film
2015	The Returned	Loretta Russo	3 episodes
2015	Mistresses	Patty Deckler	7 episodes
2015	Supernatural	Jenna's Grandmother	Episode: "Form and Void"
2015–2017	The Gourmet Detective	Doris	4 episodes
2016	Heartbeat	Mrs. Rothberg	Episode: "Pilot"
2016	Summer Love	Eleanor	Television film
2016	Aftermath	The Nurse	Episode: "Hieronymo's Mad Againe"
2017	You Me Her	Rita Seaver	2 episodes
2018	The Good Doctor	Judge Vicki Spain	Episode: "36 Hours"
2018	Christmas Pen Pals	Martha	Television film
2019	Michelle's	Tea Woman	Episode: "A Queen's Cowboy"
2019	The Last Bridesmaid	Grandma Raye	Television film
2020	Martha's Vineyard Mysteries	Judy	Episode: "A Beautiful Place to Die"
2020	Chilling Adventures of Sabrina	Elaine Kosgrove	Episode: "The Returned"
2021	Turner & Hooch	Senator Helen Pine	Episode: "To Serve and Pawtect"
2021	Family Law	Carole Creedy	Episode: "Blame It On The Mother"
2021	Legends of Tomorrow	Eleanor Roosevelt	Episode: "A Woman's Place Is in the War Effort!"
2022	The Wedding Veil	Hilda	Television film
2022	Upload	Janet Boxner	Episode: "The Outing"
2023	Superman & Lois	Governor Kerry Wexler	Episode: "Collision Course"
