= Modern Healthcare =

American healthcare business periodical

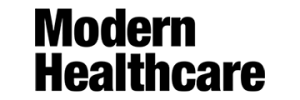
- Editor: Mary Ellen Podmolik
- Categories: Healthcare
- Frequency: Twice monthly
- Publisher: Dan Peres
- Founded: 1976
- Company: Crain Communications Inc.
- Country: United States
- Based in: Chicago
- Language: English
- Website: www.modernhealthcare.com

Modern Healthcare is a twice-monthly business publication targeting executives in the healthcare industry. It is an independent American publisher of national and regional healthcare news.

The publication is also known for providing statistical rankings, competitive insight, and practical information on topics such as information technology, federal and state legislation, Medicare/Medicaid, finance, access to capital, reimbursement, investing, supply chain, materials management, strategic planning, governance, managed care, insurers, EHRs, patient safety, quality, outpatient care, rural health, construction, staffing, legal affairs and international healthcare.

Modern Healthcare organizes several annual events, including its Health Care Hall of Fame awards dinner, and its 100 Most Powerful People in Healthcare list.

== Publication history ==
Modern Healthcare was established in 1976, and is based in Chicago, Illinois. Modern Healthcare is owned and published by Detroit-based Crain Communications Inc.
