= Dead like Me: Life After Death =

- DVD cover
- Directed by: Stephen Herek
- Written by: John Masius; Stephen Godchaux
- Based on: Dead Like Me by Bryan Fuller
- Produced by: Hudson Hickman; Sara Berrisford; Craig Roessler; Irene Litinsky
- Starring: Ellen Muth; Callum Blue; Sarah Wynter; Jasmine Guy; Britt McKillip; Christine Willes; Cynthia Stevenson; Henry Ian Cusick
- Cinematography: Bruce Chun
- Edited by: Michel Aller
- Music by: Kevin Kiner; Richard Marvin
- Production companies: Metro-Goldwyn-Mayer; Muse Entertainment
- Distributed by: 20th Century Fox Home Entertainment
- Release date: February 17, 2009
- Running time: 87 minutes
- Country: United States
- Language: English

Dead like Me: Life After Death is a 2009 American fantasy comedy-drama film directed by Stephen Herek and written by John Masius and Stephen Godchaux, based on the short-lived 2003 television series Dead Like Me created by Bryan Fuller.

Laura Harris, who played Daisy Adair in the series, was unavailable to return to the role and was replaced by Sarah Wynter. Mandy Patinkin also did not appear. The film was released on DVD on February 17, 2009, one month after its debut on Canada's Super Channel.

== Plot ==
A crew of "reapers", whose job is to extract the souls of people who are about to die, find themselves confronted by change as their habitual meeting place, Der Waffle Haus, burns down the same day their boss and head reaper Rube disappears (having "gotten his lights"). They soon meet their new boss, Cameron Kane, a slick businessman who died falling from the World Trade Center on September 11, 2001. He outfits them with color-coordinated smartphones and treats them to luxurious accommodations – teaching them, as Roxy (Jasmine Guy) puts it later, that "nothing we do here matters." This tutelage leads the reapers to perform such misdeeds as saving those they were meant to reap (Roxy); abusing immortality for financial gain (Mason, played by Callum Blue); letting a soul wander, instead of showing him "his lights" (Daisy); and otherwise selfishly focusing on their wants.

Georgia "George" Lass (Ellen Muth), the movie's narrator, is fired from Happy Time, a temp agency, after she loudly reprimands an employee for delivering a report late. The employee quits and later sues for harassment. George ends up revealing her identity to her sister Reggie (Britt McKillip). George finds herself reminiscing with Reggie and helping Reggie prepare for the death of her boyfriend, Hudson Hart (Jordan Hudyma).

George's fellow reapers confront Kane and learn that he had realized and did not care that the "pebbles" of their misdeeds would cause "waves" of misfortune elsewhere. Unhappy with his style of management, they try to deduce how exactly a fellow reaper can be killed. They shoot and drown him to no effect before finally dismembering and cremating him. His ashes are then shot into orbit along with those of Murray, the cat belonging to George's boss Delores. At the launch, Delores tells George that the employee who had sued her for harassment had done so at several of the employee's previous jobs, and George is reinstated, now with a corner office.

The reapers walk away from the launch, wondering who their new boss will be. George, after seeing her sister and mother drive off on vacation, finds herself suddenly showered with Post-Its falling from the sky, like the Post-Its their former leader Rube had used to deliver their reaping assignments.

=== Interpretation ===
Some have postulated that this means George realized she has been selected as the group's new leader. As an example, Padraig Cotter writing for Screen Rant dismisses any ambiguity and summarizes that "the movie ends with Georgia being promoted to head reaper".

== Cast ==
- Ellen Muth as Georgia Lass
- Callum Blue as Mason
- Sarah Wynter as Daisy Adair
- Jasmine Guy as Roxy Harvey
- Britt McKillip as Reggie Lass
- Shenae Grimes as Jennifer Hardick
- Christine Willes as Delores Herbig
- Cynthia Stevenson as Joy Lass
- Jordan Hudyma as Hudson Hart
- Henry Ian Cusick as Cameron Kane

== Casting ==
In June 2007, a casting call was posted on an entertainment industry website for the role of Daisy Adair, formerly played by Laura Harris, who was unable to reprise the role due to commitments with Women's Murder Club. It noted that John Masius wrote the film and also confirmed that Mandy Patinkin, who starred in the original series, was not in the film. In August 2007, it was confirmed that Sarah Wynter would take over the role of Daisy Adair from Laura Harris. Harris and Wynter previously played sisters in the second season of 24. Henry Ian Cusick would play a new character named Cameron Kane.

== Release ==
The film's release date was set for July 2008 and later rescheduled and released on February 17, 2009. An exclusive television debut occurred on January 16, 2009, on SuperChannel in Canada. It has also been shown in the United States on Syfy.

== Reception ==
David Nusair of Reel Film reviews gave the film 3 stars out of 4, declaring it as a "fitting send-off for the cult Showtime program", and describing the overall work as "an uneven yet worthwhile endeavor that's clearly been designed to appeal to both ardent fans and neophytes alike, although it does go without saying that the show's followers will have an easier time overlooking the movie's sporadic deficiencies than newcomers." Writing for 7(M) Pictures, Kevin Carr gave the film 3 out of 5 stars, praising it for reuniting the show’s cast and hoping it would lead to the creation of another film, but criticized the recasting of Daisy Adair.
