= Laura Harris =

Canadian actress (born 1976)

- Born: Laura Elizabeth Harris; November 20, 1976 (age 49); Surrey, British Columbia, Canada
- Other names: Elizabeth Harris, Laura E. Harris
- Occupation: Actress
- Years active: 1988–present

Laura Elizabeth Harris (born November 20, 1976) is a Canadian actress who appeared in a variety of roles in movies and on television. She may be best known for playing Marybeth Louise Hutchinson in The Faculty, Daisy Adair in the Showtime series Dead Like Me, and Marie Warner in Season 2 of 24. She last appeared in a recurring role in the 2021 children's series Scaredy Cats. Primarily credited as Laura Harris, over her career she has also been credited as Elizabeth Harris or Laura E. Harris.

== Early life ==
Harris's parents were schoolteachers. Born and raised in Metro Vancouver, British Columbia, she began acting in CBC Radio dramas and animated series when she was five years old. As a child Harris was educated at the private Crofton House School in Vancouver; after moving to Los Angeles she took college correspondence courses in psychology. After several years of work in television, she broke into feature films as a teenager.

== Career ==
Harris is known for her roles as Grim Reaper Daisy Adair in the cable series Dead Like Me and as Marie Warner in the spy drama 24. Her film career dates back to a 1992 appearance in the comedy Stay Tuned. She appeared as Marybeth Louise Hutchinson in The Faculty in 1998.

In 2006, Laura Harris appeared as Maggie in a British-German horror film called Severance, directed by Christopher Smith, and written by Smith and James Moran.

In the summer of 2009, she co-starred in the internationally co-produced science fiction series Defying Gravity as Zoe Barnes.

She has also performed voice-overs in animated TV shows including The New Adventures of Beany and Cecil, Astonishing X-Men, Hulk and the Agents of S.M.A.S.H. and My Little Pony Tales.

While she never officially retired from acting, Harris switched her focus in 2010 to education and began attending college at UC Berkeley. While there, she began to show an interest in activism. In 2013, she began working for a tech company that also worked to improve local communities, politically and otherwise.

In 2021, after a 6 year hiatus from acting, she performed the role of Willow Ward on the Netflix show Scaredy Cats, appearing in 3 episodes. Later in the same year Harris appeared in the Lifetime Channel movie Gone Mom.

== Filmography ==
=== Film ===
Year	Title	Role	Notes
1992	Stay Tuned	Girlfriend #1	
1995	Best Wishes Mason Chadwick	May	
1997	Habitat	Deborah Marlowe	Direct-to-video
1997	Suicide Kings	Elise Chasten	
1997	Kitchen Party	Tammy Driscoll	
1998	The Faculty	Marybeth Louise Hutchinson	
1999	The Manor	Gillian Ravenscroft	
1999	Just the Ticket	Alice / 'Cyclops'	
2000	The Highwayman	Ziggy Watson	
2000	The Calling	Kristie St. Clair	
2001	Going Greek	Paige Forrester	
2001	Come Together	Charlotte Hart	
2003	A Mighty Wind	Girl Klapper	
2003	It's Better to Be Wanted for Murder Than Not to Be Wanted at All	Ann Clemons	
2006	Severance	Maggie	
2008	Corporate Affairs	Cassie Meyers	
2011	Final Sale	Ally Graves	
2011	Underworld: Endless War	Selene	Voice role
2012	Path of Souls	Grace Hudson	
2013	Officer Down	Ellen Logue	
2013	The Privileged	Julia Westwood	
2014	Preggoland	Shannon	
2021	Gone Mom	Audrey	
2026	Remarkably Bright Creatures	Andie Minetti	

=== Television ===
Year	Title	Role	Notes
1988	The New Adventures of Beany and Cecil	(voice)	Recurring
1990	It	Loni	TV miniseries
1990	Funky Fables	Wendy (voice)	Episode: "Peter Pan"; Recurring
1991–1993	Hillside (aka Fifteen)	Ashley Frasier	TV series
1992	My Little Pony Tales	Bright Eyes (voice)	21 episodes
1994	The Odyssey	Vampire	Episode: "Night Life"
1994	Highlander: The Series	Julia Renquist	Episode: "Obsession"
1994	M.A.N.T.I.S.	Teenage Girl	Episode: "Through the Dark Circle"
1995	The X-Files	Andrea	Episode: "Die Hand Die Verletzt"
1995	Ebbie	Martha Cratchet	TV movie
1996	For Those Who Hunt the Wounded Down	Lucy Bines	TV movie
1996	The Halfback of Notre Dame	Jill Volsner	TV movie
1996	Susie Q	Jannete	TV movie
1996	A Kidnapping in the Family	Josie Cooper	TV movie
1996	Sabrina the Teenage Witch	Freddie	TV movie
1996	Sliders	Margo Hall	Episode: "The Young and the Relentless"
1996	Abduction of Innocence	Laura Rhoads	TV movie
1996	Murder at My Door	Valerie Sanders	TV movie
1997	The Outer Limits	Sarah Hayward	Episode: "Feasibility Study"
1997	Moment of Truth: Into the Arms of Danger	Jan	TV movie
1997	Poltergeist: The Legacy	Tracy Lasker	Episode: "Rough Beast"
1998	Nobody Lives Forever	Kimberly Corley	TV movie
1999	Total Recall 2070	Elana	Episode: "Nothing Like the Real Thing"
2001	The Outer Limits	Mona Lisa 37X	Episode: "Mona Lisa"
2002–2003	24	Marie Warner	14 episodes
2003	Jake 2.0	Angela Hamilton / Angela Wright	Episode: "The Spy Who Really Liked Me"
2003–2004	Dead Like Me	Daisy Adair	24 episodes
2005	A Friend of the Family	Alison Shaw	TV movie
2005	The Dead Zone	Miranda Ellis	Episode: "Vanguard"; Episode: "Saved"
2006	The Dead Zone	Miranda Ellis	Episode: "Forbidden Fruit"
2006	Hollis & Rae	Rae Devereauz	TV pilot
2006	Four Extraordinary Women	Sharon	TV movie
2006	Stargate Atlantis	Nola	Episode: "The Game"
2007	CSI: Crime Scene Investigation	Diane Kentner	Episode: "Fallen Idols"
2007–2008	Women's Murder Club	Jill Bernhardt	13 episodes
2009	Defying Gravity	Zoe Barnes	13 episodes
2010	Merlin and the Book of Beasts	Avlynn	TV movie
2010	Warehouse 13	Lauren Andrews	Episode: "Merge with Caution"
2011	Snowmageddon	Beth Miller	TV movie
2012	Astonishing X-Men	Kitty Pryde / Shadowcat (voice)	3 episodes
2012	An Officer and a Murderer	Det. Jennifer Dobson	TV movie
2014	Hulk and the Agents of S.M.A.S.H.	Elloe Kaifi (voice)	Episode: "Planet Leader"
2015	Whole Day Down	Ester	Episode: "La Cage Aux Artiste"
2021	Scaredy Cats	Willow Ward	3 episodes
