= Callum Blue =

English actor (born 1977)

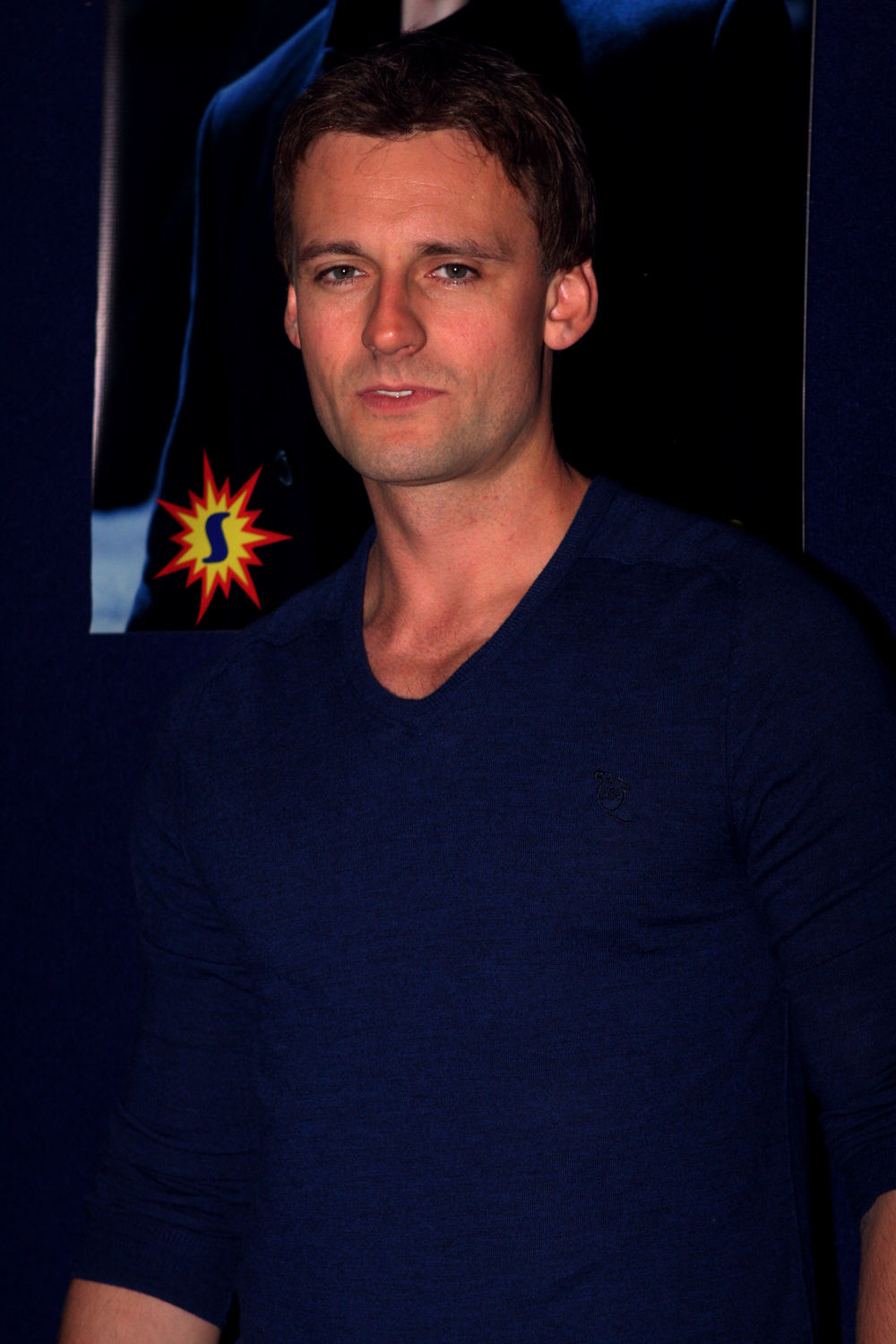
- Blue in June 2012
- Born: Daniel James Callum Blue; 19 August 1977 (age 48); London, England
- Occupation: Actor
- Years active: 1999–present

Daniel James Callum Blue (born 19 August 1977) is an English actor. He is best known for his roles on the Showtime series Dead Like Me and The Tudors, as well as his role as Zod in the American television series Smallville, Alex in the British television series The Secret Diary of a Call Girl and Andrew Jacoby in the film The Princess Diaries 2: Royal Engagement.

== Filmography ==
Film
Year	Title	Role	Notes
2001	Young Blades	Aramis	
2001	In Love and War	Eric Newby	Television film
2003	Devil's Gate	Rafe	
2004	The Princess Diaries 2: Royal Engagement	Andrew Jacoby, Duke of Kenilworth	
2006	Caffeine	Charlie	
2007	Young People Fucking	Ken	
2009	Dead Like Me: Life After Death	Mason	Direct-to-video
2009	Red Sands	Gregory Wilcox	
2009	Little Fish, Strange Pond	Sweet Stephen	
2009	Frenemy	Sweet Steven	
2009	A Christmas Carol	Caroline's husband	
2011	Super Tanker	Adam	Television film
2011	Colombiana	Richard	
2013	Fractured	Dylan/Jaron	
2013	And Now a Word From Our Sponsor	Lucas Foster	
2016	Criticized	Detective Jack Donaldson	
2014	Saul: The Journey to Damascus	Addai	
2015	Dartmoor Killing	Chris	
2015	The Red Dress	Rainer	Television film
2016	The Charnel House	Alex	
2017	Love Blossoms	Stefan Loxley	
2018	Goodnight Death	Charles	Short film

Television
Year	Title	Role	Notes
1999	The Bill	Carl Wink	Episode: "Millennium"
2000	Doctors	Denny	Episode: "Clear View"
2000	Casualty	Paul Hughes	Episode: "Sympathy for the Devil"
2001	Where the Heart Is	Clem Jones	Episode: "Pound of Flesh"
2001	Shades	Nick MacIntyre	Miniseries; episode 6
2002	As If	Mark	3 episodes
2003–2004	Dead Like Me	Mason	Main cast; 29 episodes
2005	Grey's Anatomy	Viper	Episode: "Winning a Battle, Losing the War"
2005–2006	Related	Bob Spencer	Main cast; 18 episodes
2007	The Tudors	Sir Anthony Knivert	Main cast (season 1); 8 episodes
2008	Dirt	Graham Duncan	Episode: "What Is This Thing Called"
2008	Secret Diary of a Call Girl	Alex	Main cast (series 2); 7 episodes
2009–2011	Smallville	Major Zod	Main cast (season 9); special guest star (season 10); 13 episodes
2009	The Sarah Jane Adventures	Lord Marchwood	2 episodes
2010	Sanctuary	Edward Forsythe	3 episodes
2011	Zen	Carlo Fagioli	Miniseries; episode: "Ratking"
2013	Royal Pains	Milos Kuester Ratenicz	4 episodes
2015	Proof	Peter Van Owen	Main cast
2018	Ransom	George Harris	Episode: "Alters"
2018	Blindspot	Owen Booth	Episode: "Ca-Ca-Candidate for Cri-Cri-Crime"
2019	E! True Hollywood Story	Himself	Episode: "NXVIM: Self Help or Sex Cult?"
2021	Mix Up in the Mediterranean	Henri Vermeiren	Hallmark movie
2022	The Peripheral	Reggie	Episode: "Fuck You and Eat Shit"
2023	The Rookie: Feds	Geoffrey Kerkhoff	Episode: "Red One"
2024	9-1-1	Brad Torrance	5 episodes

Web
Year	Title	Role	Notes
2012	Book Club	Jack	Main cast; 9 episodes
