= Get to the Heart: My Story =

1990 autobiography by Barbara Mandrell

- Cover of the first edition
- Author: Barbara Mandrell; George Vecsey
- Language: English
- Publisher: Bantam Books
- Publication date: 1990
- Publication place: United States
- Media type: Print (Paperback)
- Pages: 392
- ISBN: 9780307378866

Get to the Heart: My Story is the autobiography of American singer, musician and actress Barbara Mandrell. The book was released in 1990 by Bantam Books. It was written by Mandrell, along with George Vecsey.

== Background ==
Get to the Heart: My Story chronicles Barbara Mandrell's life and career in the music industry. It details her childhood years and growing up in as a child performer in country music. It also details her rise to adulthood success in the music field and her popular television series in the early 1980s. The book also discusses Mandrell's 1984 car accident which also involved her two children. The book also discusses her life following the accident and the decisions she made following that. The book was co-written with writer George Vecsey, who was previously known for his contributions to Loretta Lynn's 1976 autobiography titled Coal Miner's Daughter. The book totals to 392 pages.

== Release and reception ==
Get to the Heart: My Story was released in paperback form in 1990. It was published by Bantam Books. The autobiography placed on The New York Times Best Seller list following its release. According to Rick Koster's Texas Music, Mandrell's autobiography remained on the best-sellers list for several months following its release. Following its release, Get to the Heart received mixed reviews. Publishers Weekly commented that "The narrative style complements the Nashville star's image as 'Miss Goody Two Shoes.'" Meanwhile, Louise Titchener of The Washington Post found that Mandrell "gabs non-stop" throughout the book but praised her honesty when discussing experiences such as her 1984 car accident: "Like a steel rod running through whipped cream, the accident and its ramifications give Mandrell's story weight. They also create opportunities for her to make some surprising revelations."
