= Emma Fuhrmann =

American actress (born 2001)

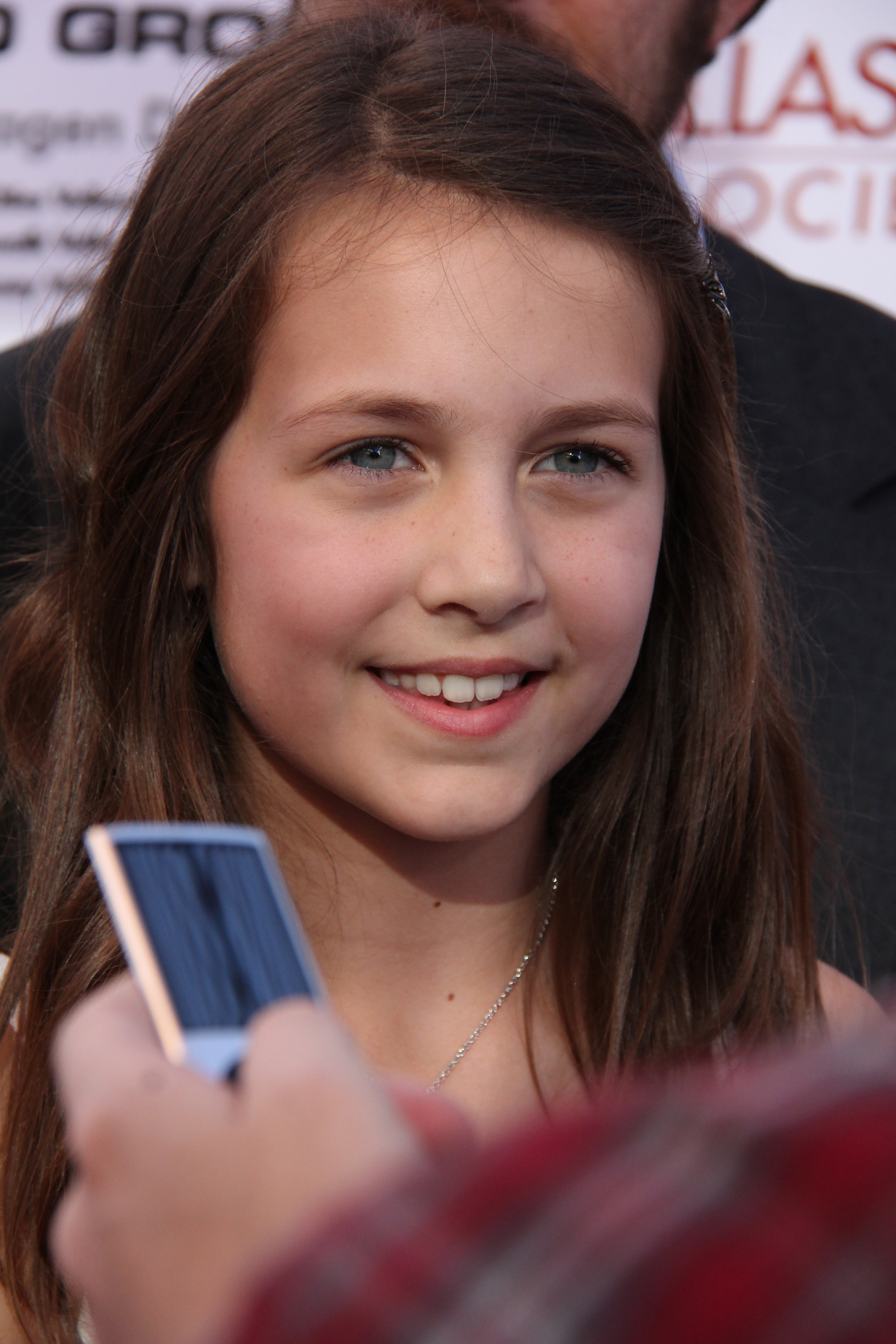
- Fuhrmann in 2012
- Born: September 15, 2001 (age 24); Dallas, Texas, U.S.
- Occupation: Actress
- Years active: 2007–present

Emma Fuhrmann (born September 15, 2001) is an American actress known for her work as Finnegan O'Neil in The Magic of Belle Isle (2012), Espn Friedman in Blended (2014), and Cassie Lang in Avengers: Endgame (2019).

== Personal life ==
Born in Dallas, Texas, on September 15, 2001, Fuhrmann is a supporter of the Alzheimer's Association and has been one of their Celebrity Champions since 2011. She also supports U.S. Military families through The Boot Campaign. Fuhrmann also works with cancer patients at Cook Children's Hospital in Fort Worth, Texas, and is a strong supporter of The Gentle Barn, a California-based sanctuary for abused animals, as well as The Humane Society of the United States.

== Career ==
Her film credits include playing the lead role as Finnegan O'Neil opposite Morgan Freeman in the Rob Reiner-directed movie, The Magic of Belle Isle, and her co-starring role as Adam Sandler's character's daughter, Espn, in Blended, along with Sandler and Drew Barrymore. Fuhrmann was also featured in the 2015 film, Lost in the Sun, with Josh Duhamel and Lynn Collins.

In 2019, she played an older Cassie Lang in the Marvel Cinematic Universe (MCU) film Avengers: Endgame. However, it was announced in 2020 that her role was recast to Kathryn Newton for Ant-Man and the Wasp: Quantumania (2023). Fuhrmann posted to her Twitter that she only found out she had been replaced when the news was made public.

She was named one of the 11 Summer Box Office Newbies you need to know about by Teen.com in 2014.

== Filmography ==
=== Film ===
Year	Title	Role	Notes
2009	The Fandango Sisters	Lil' Tiffany	
2012	The Magic of Belle Isle	Finnegan O'Neil	
2014	Blended	Espn Friedman	
2015	Lost in the Sun	Rose	
2017	Girl Followed	Regan Lindstrom	Television film
2019	Avengers: Endgame	Cassie Lang	
2020	Murder in the Vineyard	Beatrice Kirk	Television film

=== Television ===
Year	Title	Role	Notes
2010	Chase	Sissy Peele	Episode: Pilot
2010	The Good Guys	Junior Officer	Episode: Little Things
2011	Prime Suspect	Amanda Patterson	Episode: Underwater
2018	Chicago Fire	Erica Ballard	Episode: What Will Define You
2020	Station 19	Rachel Morewall	Episode: The Ghosts That Haunt Me

=== Music video ===
Year	Title	Role	Artist(s)
2010	On To Me	Lead Girl	Ladylike

== Awards and nominations ==
Year	Association	Category	Nominated work	Result	Ref.
2012	Gideon Film Festival	Best Actress in a Short Film	"Are We Listening"	Nominated	
2015	Young Artist Awards	Best Performance in a Feature Film - Young Ensemble Cast	Blended	Won	
2015	Young Artist Awards	Best Performance in a Feature Film - Best Supporting Actress	Blended	Nominated	
