= Terry Kinney =

American actor (born 1954)

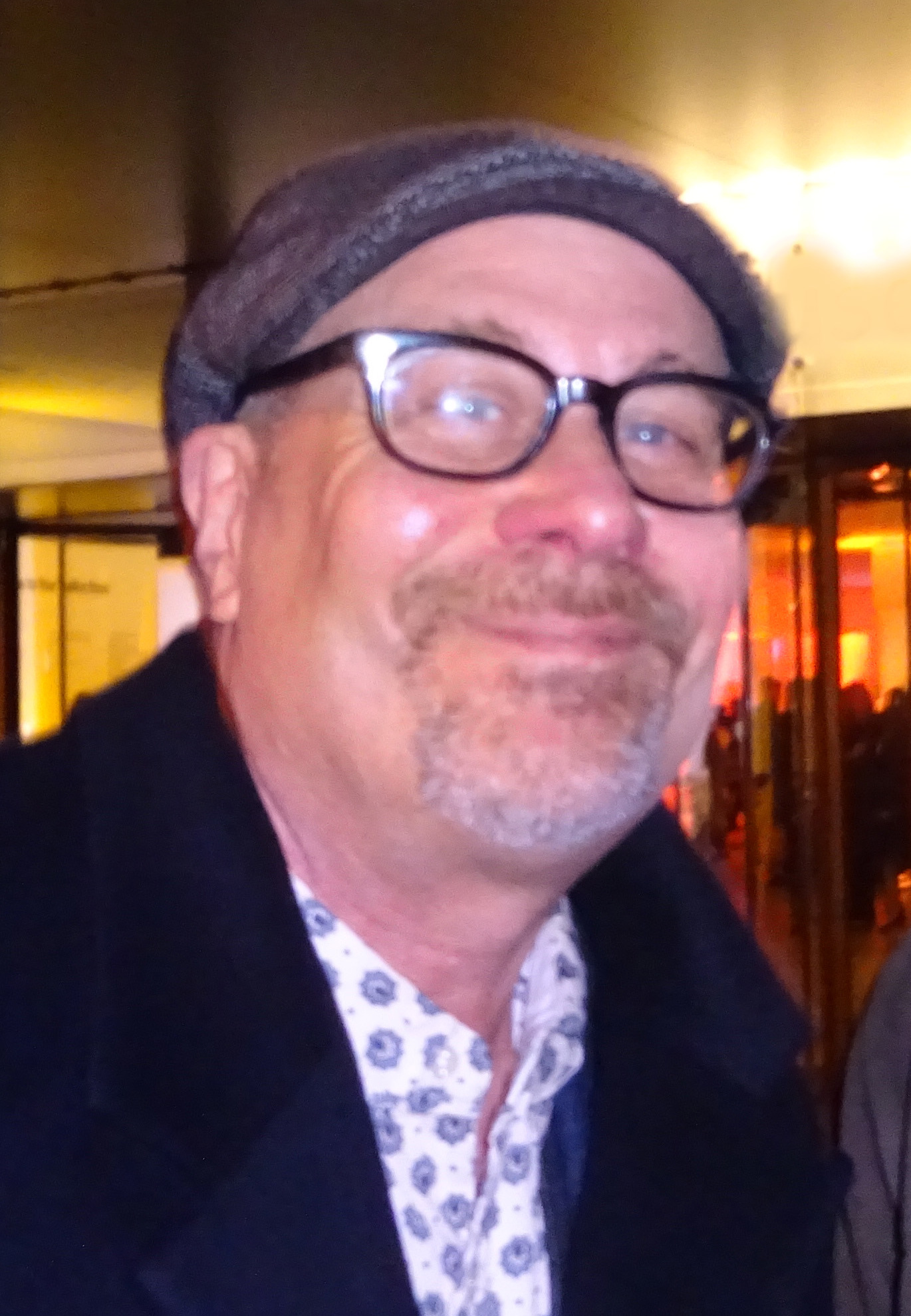
- Kinney in 2016
- Born: January 29, 1954 (age 72); Lincoln, Illinois, U.S.
- Education: Illinois State University
- Occupations: Actor, theatre director
- Years active: 1974–present
- Spouses: Elizabeth Perkins (m. 1984; div. 1988) Kathryn Erbe (m. 1993; div. 2006)
- Children: 2

Terry Kinney (born January 29, 1954) is an American actor, theater director, and founding member of the Steppenwolf Theatre Company, with Gary Sinise and Jeff Perry. Kinney is best known for his role as Tim McManus on HBO's prison drama Oz.

== Early life ==
Kinney was born in Lincoln, Illinois, the son of Elizabeth L. (née Eimer), a telephone operator, and Kenneth C. Kinney, a tractor company supervisor.

== Career ==
=== Theatre ===
Kinney has been involved in theatre since 1974, when he, Gary Sinise and Jeff Perry founded the Steppenwolf Theatre Company. In describing the company's radical usage of cinematic techniques such as accelerated time, substantial soundtracks and the rough equivalent of dissolves and bleeds, Kinney had said:

We’ve always been more influenced by cinematic techniques than stage techniques because stage techniques have been around long enough to become really boring and cliché. Our earliest influences were the films of Cassavetes, not any plays we’d seen. We always tend to score our pieces and we always tend to manipulate the audience to look where we want them to look and the way to do that is to get very tight on certain situations.

He has directed several plays and performed in several. He performed in the Steppenwolf Theatre Company production of Orphans which premiered Off-Broadway at the Westside Theatre with John Mahoney and Kevin Anderson to critical acclaim. 1985, he performed in the Drama Desk Award–winning play Balm in Gilead by Lanford Wilson. In 1996, Kinney played Tilden in the Sam Shepard play Buried Child directed by Gary Sinise in New York City. During a performance of Buried Child, Kinney had a "terrible, horrible, screaming panic attack" and stayed offstage for several years, only returning in 2002 in a performance with Kurt Elling called Petty Delusions and Grand Obsessions. He directed Richard Greenberg's play Well Appointed Room in 2006 and Neil LaBute's reasons to be pretty in 2009. In 2010, he directed another Lanford Wilson play, Fifth of July, for Bay Street Theatre (July) and for the Williamstown Theatre Festival (August).

In October–November 2012, Kinney directed Checkers, a new play by Douglas McGrath at the Vineyard Theatre, New York City. He directed Lyle Kessler's new play Collision in January 2013 at Rattlestick Playwrights Theater.

=== Film and television ===
Besides his theatrical work, Kinney has done much acting, mainly for television, starting in 1986 with an appearance in Miami Vice. In 1987, he starred as Pastor Tom Bird in the CBS miniseries Murder Ordained opposite JoBeth Williams. He is perhaps best known for his portrayal of the idealistic unit manager Tim McManus on HBO's prison drama Oz.

In 1995, Kinney co-starred with Tommy Lee Jones in an adaptation of an Elmer Kelton western novel titled The Good Old Boys. Tommy Lee Jones directed this made-for-TV movie which also co-starred Sissy Spacek, Matt Damon, Sam Shepard, Wilford Brimley and retired Texas Ranger H. Joaquin Jackson.

Kinney also directed two episodes of Oz, "Cruel and Unusual Punishments" in 1999 and "Wheel of Fortune" in 2002. Explaining the experience, he said, "it was great training for shooting on a limited budget, on a time crunch."

His film work includes a role in the 1988 film Miles from Home, which featured many cast members of Steppenwolf and was directed by Sinise. In 1995, he played mayoral candidate Todd Carter in Carl Franklin's film Devil in a Blue Dress. In 1996, Kinney played a comedic role as Uncle David in the coming-of-age drama Fly Away Home. In 1999, Kinney played the lead in the indie film The Young Girl and the Monsoon, about Hank, a 39-year-old photojournalist dealing with a demanding job and a growing daughter. In 2001, he played the estranged father of the protagonist, Sara Johnson (Julia Stiles), in the film Save the Last Dance.

In 2006, Kinney directed an 18-minute film called Kubuku Rides (This Is It), which portrays the effects of drug addiction of a mother as seen by her young son. The film is based on the short story by Larry Brown. It is the first film produced by Steppenwolf Films. In 2008, he directed Diminished Capacity, a feature film with a big Steppenwolf presence, based on the Sherwood Kiraly novel of that name.

For television, in 2008, Kinney was Deputy Attorney General Zach Williams in Canterbury's Law, a short-lived Fox series. In 2009, he played Sergeant Harvey Brown in the ABC series The Unusuals, and in the same year, he had a recurring role as Special Agent Sam Bosco on the hit CBS series The Mentalist.

2010 saw a pilot for a CBS drama called The Line, starring Dylan Walsh as ATF Agent Donovan with Kinney as a complex criminal, Alex Gunderson, that Donovan is hunting. The series was to be based on a novel by Robert Gregory Browne called Kiss Her Goodbye. (Browne said that the show was tentatively called ATF.) In 2011 Kinney had a recurring role in the North American adaptation of Being Human as Heggemann, an 1,100-year-old Dutch vampire. In April 2012 he starred in the CBS police procedural drama NYC 22 as Field Training Officer Daniel "Yoda" Dean. However, after four episodes NYC 22 was axed. Kinney also guest starred as Salvatore Amato, a member of a Chicago crime family, in the new Fox drama The Mob Doctor premiering in September 2012.

Kinney was cast as a series regular on ABC drama series Black Box opposite Kelly Reilly and Vanessa Redgrave, set to air on ABC in 2014.

From 2016 to 2023, Kinney has played Hall, a recurring character in the TV series Billions. In 2019, Terry was cast in the Shonda Rhimes mini-series Inventing Anna alongside Julia Garner, Laverne Cox, and Anna Chlumsky. The series, which depicts Instagram-famous scam artist Anna Sorokin, premiered on Netflix in 2022.

== Personal life ==
From 1984 to 1988, Kinney was married to Elizabeth Perkins. From 1993 to 2005, he was married to his Oz co-star Kathryn Erbe, with whom he has two children.

Kinney lives in Brooklyn, New York.

== Theater directing ==
Year	Title	Role	Notes
1976	The Lover	Director	Steppenwolf Theatre, Chicago/Starred Laurie Metcalf and Jeff Perry
1981	Of Mice and Men	Director	Steppenwolf Theatre, Chicago/Starred Gary Sinise
1982	And a Nightingale Sang	Director	Steppenwolf Theatre, Chicago/Starred Joan Allen
1984	Fool for Love	Director	Steppenwolf Theatre, Chicago/Starred William Petersen and Rondi Reed
1985	Streamers	Director	Steppenwolf Theatre, Chicago/Starred Gary Sinise and Jeff Perry
1990	Reckless	Director	Steppenwolf Theatre, Chicago/Starred Joan Allen
1992	My Thing Of Love	Director	Steppenwolf Theatre, Chicago/Starred Laurie Metcalf
1994	A Clockwork Orange	Director	Steppenwolf Theatre, Chicago
1997	A Streetcar Named Desire	Director	Steppenwolf Theatre, Chicago/Starred Gary Sinise
1998	Eyes For Consuela	Director	Manhattan Theatre Club, New York City/Starred David Strathairn
2000	One Flew Over The Cuckoo's Nest	Director	Steppenwolf Theatre, Chicago/Starred Gary Sinise
2003	The Violet Hour	Director	Steppenwolf Theatre, Chicago
2004	Beautiful Child	Director	Vineyard Theatre, New York City/Starred Gary Sinise
2005	After Ashley	Director	Vineyard Theatre, New York City/Starred Kieran Culkin and Anna Paquin
2006	The Well-Appointed Room	Director	Steppenwolf Theatre, Chicago/Starred Josh Charles and Tracy Letts
2006	The Agony and the Agony	Director	Vineyard Theatre, New York City/Starred Nicky Silver
2009	reasons to be pretty (Neil LaBute)	Director	MCC, New York City/Starred Piper Perabo and Thomas Sadoski
2010	Fifth of July (Lanford Wilson)	Director	Bay Street Theatre (July), then Williamstown Theatre Festival (August)
2019	Curse of the Starving Class (Sam Shepard)	Director	Signature Theatre, New York City/Starred Maggie Siff

== Filmography ==
=== Film ===
Year	Title	Role	Notes
1978	A Wedding	Caterer	Uncredited
1985	Seven Minutes in Heaven	Bill the Photographer	
1986	No Mercy	Paul Deveneux	
1987	A Walk on the Moon	Lew Ellis	
1988	Miles from Home	Mark	
1991	Queens Logic	Jeremy	
1991	Talent for the Game	Gil Lawrence	
1992	The Last of the Mohicans	John Cameron	
1993	Body Snatchers	Steve Malone	
1993	The Firm	Lamar Quinn	
1995	Devil in a Blue Dress	Todd Carter	
1996	Sleepers	Ralph Ferguson	
1996	Fly Away Home	David Alden	
1997	White Lies	Richard	
1998	Luminous Motion	Pedro	
1999	The Young Girl and the Monsoon	Hank	With Ellen Muth
1999	Oxygen	Captain Tim Foster	
2000	The House of Mirth	George Dorset	
2001	Save the Last Dance	Roy Johnson	
2003	House Hunting	Hogue	Short film
2004	Focus Group	Bob Sadler	Short film
2005	The Game of Their Lives	Dent McSkimming	
2005	Runaway	Dr. Maxim	
2007	Turn the River	Markus	
2012	Promised Land	David Churchill	
2015	I Smile Back	Dr. Page	
2017	Abundant Acreage Available	Jesse Ledbetter	
2017	November Criminals	Principal Karlstadt	
2018	Mile 22	Johnny Porter	
2019	Extremely Wicked, Shockingly Evil and Vile	Mike Fisher	
2021	The Little Things	Captain Farris	

=== Television ===
Year	Title	Role	Notes
1986	Miami Vice	Asst. State Atty. William Pepin	Episode: "The Good Collar"
1987–1989	thirtysomething	Steve Woodman	7 episodes
1987	Murder Ordained	Pastor Tom Bird	TV film
1990	Kojak: None So Blind	Paul Hogarth	TV film
1991	The Grapes of Wrath	Reverend Jim Casey	Teleplay
1992	Deadly Matrimony	Jim Mihkalik	Miniseries
1993	JFK: Reckless Youth	Joseph P. Kennedy	TV film
1995	The Good Old Boys	Walter Calloway	TV film (dir: Tommy Lee Jones)
1996	Homicide: Life on the Street	Richard Laumer	Episode: "Map of the Heart"
1996	Critical Choices	Lloyd	TV film
1997	George Wallace	Billy Watson	TV film (dir: John Frankenheimer)
1997–2003	Oz	Emerald City Unit Manager Tim McManus	Main role
1998	Don't Look Down	Dr. Paul Sadowski	TV film (dir: Wes Craven)
1999	That Championship Season	James Daly	TV film
2001	Midwives	Rand Danforth	TV film
2002	The Laramie Project	Dennis Shepard	TV film
2003	Queens Supreme	Andrew Grigg	Episode: "Words That Wound"
2004	CSI: NY	District Attorney Tom Mitford	2 episodes
2005	Amber Frey: Witness for the Prosecution	Detective Neil O'Hara	TV film
2006	Kidnapped	James "Sully" Sullivan	Episode: "Sorry, Wrong Number"
2008	Law & Order	Clifford Chester	Episode: "Driven"
2008	Wainy Days	Marvin	Episode: "Carol"
2008	Canterbury's Law	Deputy Attorney General Zach Williams	Main cast
2009	The Unusuals	Sergeant Harvey Brown	Main cast
2009	The Mentalist	Special Agent Sam Bosco	Recurring role
2010	The Good Wife	Gerald Kozko	3 episodes
2011–2012	Being Human	Heggemann	Recurring role
2012	NYC 22	Daniel "Yoda" Dean	Main cast
2012	The Mob Doctor	Dante Amato	2 episodes
2013	Elementary	Howard Ennis	Episode: "The Deductionist"
2014	Black Box	Dr. Owen Morely	Series regular
2015	Show Me a Hero	Peter Smith	Miniseries
2015	Fargo	Chief Gibson	2 episodes
2016–2017	Good Behavior	Christian	Series regular
2016–2022	Billions	Hall	Recurring role
2018	Electric Dreams	Mr. Dick	Episode: "The Father Thing"
2022	Inventing Anna	Barry	Miniseries (8 episodes)
2022	The Watcher	Jasper Winslow	4 episodes
2023	Justified: City Primeval	Toma Costia	3 episodes
