= Josh Wiggins =

American actor (born 1998)

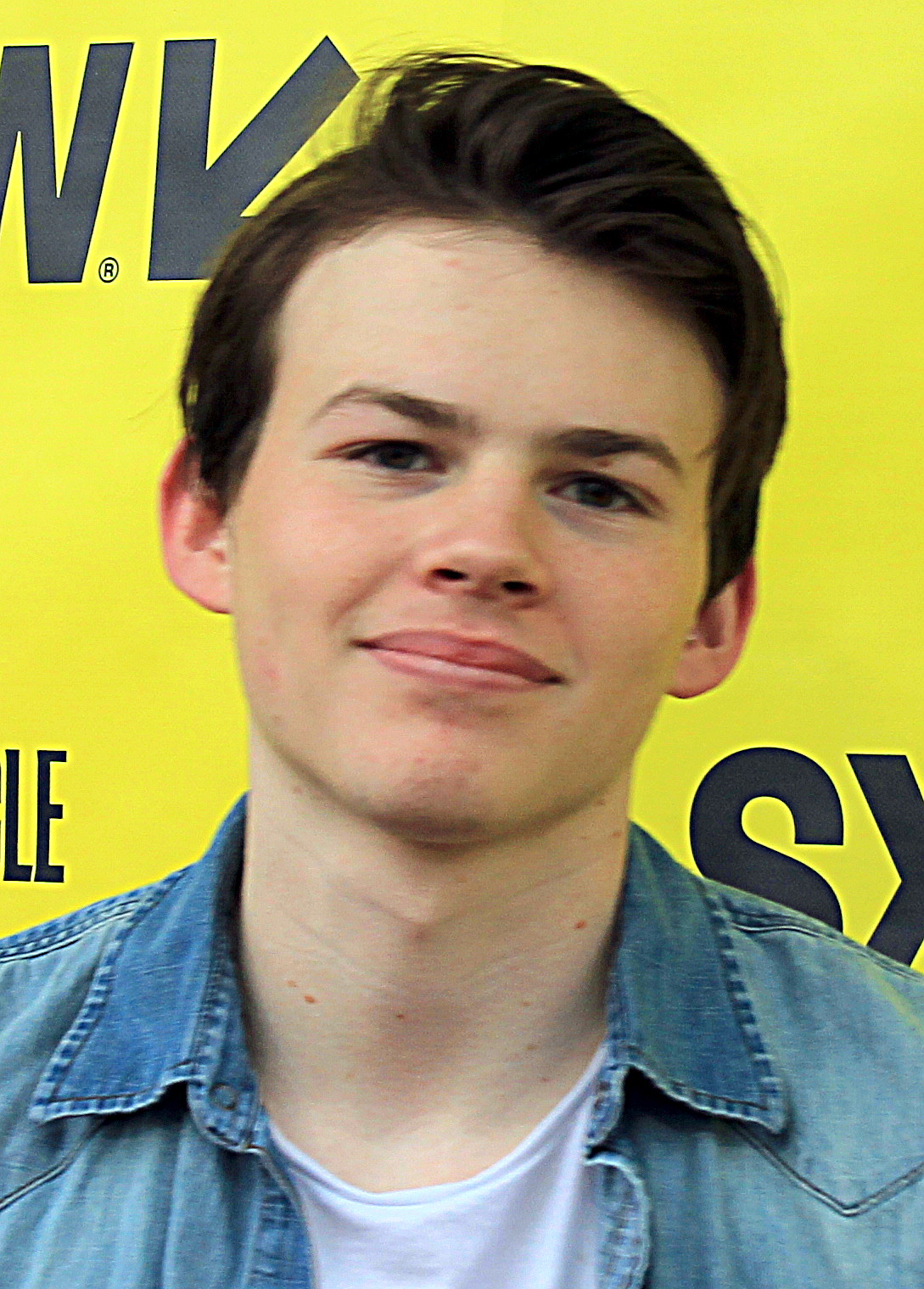
- Wiggins at SXSW 2017
- Born: November 2, 1998 (age 27); Houston, Texas, U.S.
- Occupation: Actor
- Years active: 2014–present

Josh Wiggins (born November 2, 1998) is an American actor, best known for his roles of Jacob Wilson in the drama Hellion (2014), Justin Wincott in the adventure drama Max (2015) and Franky Winter in Giant Little Ones (2018).

== Early life ==
Wiggins was born on November 2, 1998, in Houston, Texas, to Jennifer and Steve Wiggins. Wiggins has two older brothers, Jacob and Luke.

== Career ==
In 2014, Wiggins made his feature film debut as the lead role of Jacob Wilson in the drama Hellion with Aaron Paul and Juliette Lewis, and directed by Kat Candler. The film premiered at Sundance Film Festival on January 17, 2014, and released domestically on June 13, 2014. His performance in the film was praised by several critics.

In 2015, Wiggins starred as Justin Wincott in the adventure drama Max with Dejon LaQuake, Thomas Haden Church, and Robbie Amell, about Max, a dog starring in the titular role. The film was directed by Boaz Yakin and released domestically on June 26, 2015, by Warner Bros. Pictures. Also in 2015, Wiggins co-starred as Louis in the action-thriller film Lost in the Sun with Josh Duhamel. In 2017, he starred in the survival drama Walking Out and the drama movie The Bachelors.

Wiggins next played the lead role of Franky Winter in Keith Behrman's coming of age story Giant Little Ones. The film's critically acclaimed screenplay explored present-day complexities of sexual identity and was released in 2018 and 2019 (Canada and the United States respectively).

== Filmography ==
=== Film ===
Year	Title	Role	Notes
2014	Hellion	Jacob Wilson	
2015	Max	Justin Wincott	
2015	Lost in the Sun	Louis Moody	
2016	Mean Dreams	Jonas Ford	
2017	Walking Out	David	
2017	The Bachelors	Wes Palet	
2018	Giant Little Ones	Franky Winter	
2019	Light from Light	Owen	
2020	Greyhound	Talker #1	
2020	I Used to Go Here	Hugo Gaffney	
2022	Apollo 10 1/2: A Space Age Childhood	Steve	
2024	Armor	Casey Brody	
