= The Truth About Jane =

2000 television film by Lee Rose

- The Truth About Jane
- Written by: Lee Rose
- Directed by: Lee Rose
- Starring: Ellen Muth; Stockard Channing; Kelly Rowan
- Music by: Terence Blanchard
- Original language: English

Production
- Producer: Orly Adelson
- Cinematography: Eric Van Haren Noman
- Editor: Peter V. White
- Running time: 87 minutes
- Production companies: Orly Adelson Productions; Hearst Entertainment Productions

Original release
- Network: Lifetime
- Release: August 7, 2000

The Truth About Jane is a 2000 Lifetime original movie directed by Lee Rose and starring Stockard Channing, Ellen Muth, Kelly Rowan, Jenny O'Hara and RuPaul (credited as RuPaul Charles). The film is about a teenage girl named Jane (Muth) who struggles with her sexuality and with her mother (Channing) who refuses to accept her. It first aired on TV on August 7, 2000. The film was nominated for several awards, including Outstanding TV Movie from GLAAD, Outstanding Performance by a Female Actor in a Television Movie or Miniseries (for Channing) from the Screen Actors Guild, and Original Long Form from the Writers Guild of America.

== Plot ==
Teenage Jane is struggling with her sexuality and her friends notice her lack of interest in boys. Jane becomes friends with a new girl named Taylor. Eventually, Jane and Taylor share their first kiss. Jane wonders to herself if kissing Taylor made her gay, and the two become an official couple. After Jane and Taylor have sex for the first time, Jane tells Taylor that it was a mistake and that she's not gay. Hurt, Taylor breaks up with Jane.

Jane meets with her English teacher and guidance counselor Ms. Walcott and confesses that she has lost her virginity, not mentioning that it was to another girl. Ms. Walcott suggests that Jane write Taylor a note to express how she feels and why she acted the way she did, which Jane does. A few days later, Taylor shows up at her house and the two share a kiss, unaware of Jane's brother watching them through the partially open bedroom door. Jane's brother outs Jane and Taylor and the news spreads quickly. Jane comes out to her parents, who send her to therapy.

The sneaking around becomes too much for Taylor and she breaks up with Jane. Ms. Walcott stops to comfort Jane upon seeing her crying. Ms. Walcott comes out to Jane as a lesbian and tells her the story of her first time falling in love and being dumped so Jane starts to feel better. However, during lunch at school, her old friends begin taunting her and Jane attacks one of them, causing her to get suspended.

Following the suspension, Jane's mother Janice hears a group of boys making homophobic remarks about Jane. Janice confronts her daughter and claims that what Jane is doing isn't normal. Jane angrily rants that gay people are perfectly normal, unintentionally outing Ms. Walcott in the process. Janice confronts Ms. Walcott at the school, demanding that she stay away from Jane and threatening to go to the school board if she doesn't.

When Jane's parents decide to send her away to boarding school, Jane runs away to Ms. Walcott's house. Jane apologizes to Ms. Walcott for outing her and tells her that she is considering suicide. Ms. Walcott goes to Jane's parents and tells them that Jane is considering suicide. Janice and Jane reconcile, despite Janice still being uncomfortable with her daughter's sexuality. They begin attending PFLAG meetings and gradually, Janice learns to accept Jane for who she is.

The film ends with a dedication to Matthew Shepard and to "all the men & women who love differently."

== Cast ==
- Stockard Channing as Janice
- Ellen Muth as Jane
- Kelly Rowan as Ms. Lynn Walcott
- Jenny O'Hara as Beth
- RuPaul as Jimmy
- Noah Fleiss as Ned
- James Naughton as Robert
- Alicia Lagano as Taylor
- Kacy Clark as Brad
- Mark Siegel as Doctor
- Erika Moore as Jane, age 9
- Tiffany Westlie as Kate
- Kenny McKeon as Grant
- Michelle Lane as Betsy
- Amy Davidson as Elizabeth
- Melissa Wolfklain as Claire
- Lillie Richardson as Dr. Sanders
- John T. Huggins Jr. as Boy
- Makyle Kaplan-Dailey as Gay Boy
- Robert Harvey as Mr. Anderson
- Victor Kravetz as Boy
- Molly Schaffer as Margaret
- Lucky Hayes as Dorothy
- Terey Summers as Lorraine
- Maedell Dixon as Susan
- Will Bribiescas as Raver / Club Scene
- Krysten Jackson as Student
- Chuck Rahill as Ambulance Patient
- John Thomas as Boy
- Bob Huff as Doctor with Briefcase
- George M. Kostuch as Teacher
- Jose Rosete as Diner Patron
- Cheryl Schmidt as Student

== Reception ==
The film has a score of 68% on Cinafilm based on 36 critics' reviews as well as a 63 out of 100 on Moviefone.
