= Annalee Jefferies =

American actress

- Born: Houston, Texas
- Education: Royal Academy of Dramatic Art

Annalee Jefferies is an American stage actress.

== Early years ==
Jefferies' father was a ranch manager, and her mother was artistically inclined. She lived in Texas her first 11 years, then moved with her family to Australia. They returned to the United States when she was 15. She was active in drama in high school and college before refining her talent at the Royal Academy of Dramatic Art in London.

== Career ==
Jefferies was in the nine-hour trilogy of Horton Foote's Orphan’s Home Cycle in New York, directed by Michael Wilson, which won the Drama Desk Award for Theatrical Event of the Season of 2010. She played Blanche in Streetcar Named Desire, Violet in Suddenly Last Summer, Hannah in Night of the Iguana, Carol in Orpheus Descending, and Amanda in The Glass Menagerie, which was among the Wall Street Journal’s best 10 productions of 2009.

She toured England in John Barton’s ten hour epic Tantalus, directed by Sir Peter Hall. She spent 20 years as a resident company member at the Alley Theatre (1986–2007) and 3 years as a resident company member at the Arena Stage (1978–1981). Her film credits include Hellion, Arlo and Julie, The Sideways Light, The Girl, Monsters, Violets Are Blue, and No Mercy.

On television, Jefferies appeared in Dallas, and War of The Worlds.

She currently lives on a farm in Brenham, Texas.

== Film and television ==
- Arlo and Julie - Tess (Dir: Steve Mims)
- Patriot Act - Dr. Christina Glenka (Dir: Wayne Slaten)
- The Sideways Light - Ruth (Dir: Jennifer Harlow)
- Hellion - Fran (Dir: Kat Candler)
- War of the Worlds - PBS documentary
- Dallas - 2 episodes Carina (Dirs: Steve Robin, Jesse Bochco)
- Ain't Them Bodies Saints (film 2013) - Mary (Dir: David Lowery)
- The Girl - Gloria (Dir: David Riker)
- Annabel - Molly (Dir: Daniel Izui)
- Monsters - Homeless Woman (Dir: Gareth Edwards)
- Walker, Texas Ranger - Molly (Dir: Tony Mordente)
- Ned Blessing: The True Story of My Life - Flood Phillips (Dir: Peter Werner)
- L. A. Law "Dances With Sharks" - Janice Long (Dir: David Carson)
- No Mercy - Susan (Dir: Richard Pearce)
- Violets Are Blue - Sally (Dir: Jack Fisk)
- Charlie's Angels - Joan Freeman (Dir: Larry Doheny)
- Queen Sugar - Frances Boudreaux (Dir: Ava DuVernay)

== New York stage ==
=== Playwrights Horizons ===
- What Didn't Happen - Elaine (Dir: Michael Wilson)

== Regional stage ==
=== Royal Shakespeare Company, Denver Performing Arts Complex ===
- Tantalus - Helen of Troy, Clytemnestra, Andromache, Ilione (Dir: Sir Peter Hall, Edward Hall)

=== Hartford Stage Company ===
- 8 By Tenn - Lucretia, Viola, Grace, Madge (Dir: Michael Wilson)
- The Night of the Iguana - Hannah Jelkes
- A Streetcar Named Desire - Blanche DuBois
- Seascape - Sara (Dir: Mark Lamos)
- Three Sisters - Olga
- Our Town

=== Hartford Theatreworks ===
- The Year of Magical Thinking - Joan Didion (Dir: Steve Campo)

=== Williamstown Theatre ===
- An Enemy of the People - Mrs. Stockman (Dir: Gerald Freeman)

=== Alley Theatre, Houston, Texas ===
1 woman play - Bad Dates

Dir: Gregory Boyd

- The Comedy of Errors - Adriana
- Travesties - Nadya
- One Flew Over the Cuckoo's Nest - Nurse Ratchet
- Measure for Measure - Mariana
- Tartuffe - Elmire

Dir: Michael Wilson

- A Streetcar Named Desire - Blanche DuBois
- Angels in America - Harper Pitt
- Lips Together, Teeth Apart - Chloe
- Dancing at Lughnasa - Kate

Dir: Misc

- Hedda Gabler - Hedda (Dir: Gerald Freeman)
- A View from the Bridge - Beatrice (Dir: Stephen Rayne)
- Death and the Maiden - Paulina Salas (Dir: Ken Grantham)
- Our Town - Mrs. Webb (Dir: José Quintero)
- Danton's Death - Marion (Dir: Robert Wilson)
- American Vaudeville - Fanny Brice (Dir: Anne Bogart)
- Alfred Stieglitz Loves O'Keiffe - Georgia (Dir: Eb Thomas)
- Henceforward... U.S. Premier - Nan 300F, Corrina (Dir: Alan Ayckbourn)
- A Lie of the Mind - Beth (Dir: George Anderson)

=== Great Lakes Theatre Festival ===
- Antony and Cleopatra - Cleopatra (Dir: Gerald Freeman)
- Uncle Vanya - Sonya

=== Long Wharf Theatre ===
- Tobacco Road - Elly May (Dir: Arvin Brown)

=== Arena Stage, Washington D.C. ===
- God Bless You, Mr. Rosewater - Mary Moody (Dir: Howard Ashman, Mary Kyte)
- Kean - Anna Danby (Dir: Martin Fried)
- The Man Who Came to Dinner - Maggie Cutler (Dir: Douglass Wager)
- An American Tragedy - Roberta Alden (Dir: Michael Lessac)
- Don Juan - Mautherine (Dir: Liviu Ciulei)
- After The Fall - Maggie (Dir: Zelda Fischandler)

== Public theatre ==
- Aunt Dan and Lemon - Understudy: Aunt Dan, Mother

== See also ==
- Royal Shakespeare Company
- Denver Performing Arts Complex
- Playwrights Horizons
- Long Wharf Theatre
