= Mia Xitlali =

American actress and singer (born 1999)

- Born: Mia Xitlali Tenorio; July 29, 1999 (age 26); Los Angeles, California, United States
- Occupations: Actress, Singer
- Years active: 2014–present
- Spouse: Gabriel Mathis (m. 2025)

Mia Xitlali Tenorio (Seet-la-lee; born July 29, 1999), known professionally as Mia Xitlali, is an American actress and singer best known for the 2015 feature film Max.

== Early life ==
Xitlali was born in Los Angeles, California, the daughter of performers. Her father is from El Paso, Texas, while her mother is Mexican (from Guadalajara). She started acting at the age of seven and knew she wanted to be an actress after performing in the musical South Pacific at the Hollywood Bowl.

== Career ==
After working on the short film Selling Rosario, Xitlali was given the opportunity to work with Boaz Yakin on his movie Max. She is currently still working in theater.

== Personal life ==
By 2025, Xitlali had married social media influencer Gabriel Mathis, better known as Gabriel Laceup, and were welcoming their first child.

== Filmography ==
Year	Title	Role	Notes
2014	Selling Rosario	Rosario	Short film
2015	Max	Carmen	
2016	Girl Meets World	Carla	Episode: "Girl Meets True Maya"
2016	Journey to the East	Bebe	Pilot
2017	La Quinceañera	Alejandra Santos	Main role
2018	Requiescat	Lucia	Short film
2019	Confessional	Amelia	
2022	Coast	Kat Acosta	
