= Hellion (film) =

2014 film by Kat Candler

- Film poster
- Directed by: Kat Candler
- Written by: Kat Candler
- Produced by: Jonathan Duffy; Andrew Logan; Kelly Williams
- Starring: Aaron Paul; Juliette Lewis; Josh Wiggins; Deke Garner
- Cinematography: Brett Pawlak
- Edited by: Alan Canant
- Production companies: Across Town Productions; IFC Films; Arts+Labor; Silver Sail Entertainment
- Distributed by: Sundance Selects
- Release dates: January 17, 2014 (Sundance Film Festival); June 13, 2014 (United States)
- Running time: 99 minutes
- Country: United States
- Language: English
- Box office: $55,708

Hellion (also known as Retribution) is a 2014 American drama film written and directed by Kat Candler. The film stars Aaron Paul as an emotionally absent father of two sons. It also stars Juliette Lewis, Josh Wiggins in his film debut, Deke Garner, Jonny Mars, and Annalee Jefferies.

The film premiered in-competition in the US Dramatic Category at 2014 Sundance Film Festival on January 17, 2014.

== Plot ==
Thirteen-year-old Jacob's increasing delinquent behavior forces Child Protective Services to place his little brother, Wes, with his aunt. Jacob and his emotionally absent father, Hollis, must finally take responsibility for their actions and for each other in order to bring Wes home.

== Cast ==
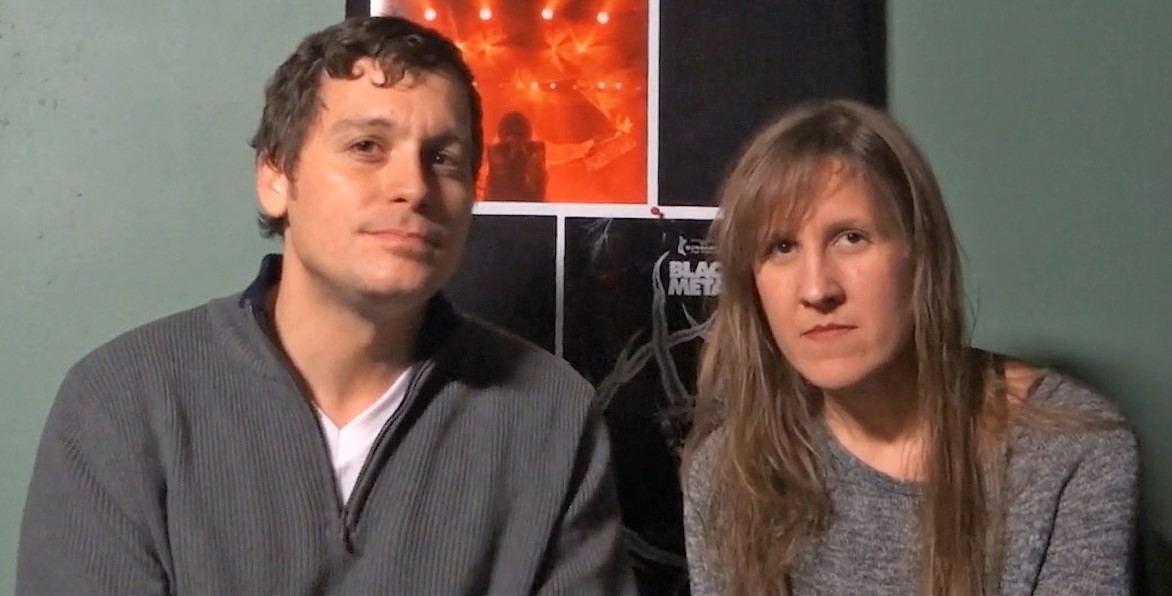
Actor Jonny Mars and director Kat Candler in 2014

- Aaron Paul as Hollis Wilson
- Juliette Lewis as Pam
- Josh Wiggins as Jacob Wilson
- Deke Garner as Wes Wilson
- Jonny Mars as Duncan
- Annalee Jefferies as Fran
- Dalton Sutton as Lance

== Reception ==
=== Critical response ===
Hellion received mixed to positive reviews upon its premiere at the 2014 Sundance Film Festival, although newcomer Josh Wiggins's performance was especially praised. As of May 2025, the film has an approval rating of 58% on Rotten Tomatoes, based on 48 reviews with an average score of 6.20/10. The film also has a score of 55 out of 100 on Metacritic based on 24 critics indicating "mixed or average" reviews.

Peter Debruge, in his review for Variety, compared the film with Terrence Malick's 2011 film The Tree of Life and said that "“Hellion” offers a more conventional plot, but that is also its chief limitation, somehow reducing the complexity of its verite character study to relatively straightforward psychology" and praised Wiggins performance by saying that "Newcomer Josh Wiggins steals the show in this verite-style story of an agitated 13-year-old delinquent."

David Rooney of The Hollywood Reporter praised the performances of Paul and Wiggins, in his review he said that "Aaron Paul's wrung-out performance as a widowed blue-collar father who has given up on life, all but abandoning his sons to fend for themselves. And the work of young newcomer Josh Wiggins will turn heads as the most volatile of those two kids, spinning out of control. The actors' raw honesty and the unvarnished authenticity of the Southeast Texas environment lend weight to this slow-burn drama about responsibility, even if its storytelling is unrelentingly downbeat and lacks muscularity."

Matt Goldberg of Collider.com gave the film a positive review by saying that "Despite all of its wandering, loosely tied together stories and uneven pacing, there's an odd sweetness to Kat Candler's Hellion. Rather than broken characters focused solely on self-help and improving their own station, it's an attempt to salvage a family even though that family may be too damaged to repair. Characters who do bad things but are good deep down is undoubtedly saccharine, but it works thanks to Candler's sincere direction and earnest performances from lead actors Aaron Paul and Josh Wiggins."

Rodrigo Perez of Indiewire criticized the film and said that "Admittedly heartbreaking and moving in its final moments, “Hellion” just can't quite convince or coalesce its ideas of struggle, pain and fury in a meaningful or new way. Our charitable human nature may empathize with everyone's plight, but the recognition that much of its dismal sensibility is far too calculating and predestined is certainly disconcerting" but ultimately praised the cast performance by saying that Hellion, however, does possess strong characteristics in the form of performances—the teenager Josh Wiggins is definitely a stand-out that people will be talking about post-festival, and Juliette Lewis and the boys, Deke Garner, Jonny Mars and Walt Roberts, all deliver authentically convincing turns."

== Accolades ==
Year	Award / Film Festival	Category	Recipient(s)	Result
2014	Dallas International Film Festival	Narrative Feature Grand Jury Prize	Kat Candler	Won
2014	Edinburgh International Film Festival	Audience Award	Kat Candler	Nominated
2014	Houston Film Critics Society Awards	Texas Independent Film Award	Kat Candler	Nominated
2014	SXSW Film Festival	SXSW Gamechanger Emergent Woman Director Award - Special Mention	Kat Candler	Won
2014	Sundance Film Festival	Grand Jury Prize	Kat Candler	Nominated
2014	DeadCENTER Film Festival	Grand Jury Narrative Feature	Kat Candler	Won
