= The Good Old Boys (film) =

1995 TV film

- UK VHS cover
- Genre: Western
- Based on: The Good Old Boys by Elmer Kelton
- Teleplay by: Tommy Lee Jones; J.T. Allen
- Directed by: Tommy Lee Jones
- Starring: Tommy Lee Jones; Terry Kinney; Frances McDormand; Sam Shepard; Sissy Spacek; Wilford Brimley; Matt Damon
- Music by: John McEuen
- Country of origin: United States
- Original language: English

Production
- Executive producer: Edgar J. Scherick
- Producer: Salli Newman
- Cinematography: Alan Caso
- Editor: Kimberly Ray
- Running time: 118 minutes
- Production companies: Edgar J. Scherick Associates; Firebrand Productions; The Javelina Film Company; Turner Pictures

Original release
- Network: TNT
- Release: March 5, 1995

The Good Old Boys is a 1995 American Western television film directed by Tommy Lee Jones and written by Jones and J.T. Allen, based on the 1978 novel of the same name by Elmer Kelton. Jones stars alongside Terry Kinney, Frances McDormand, Sam Shepard, Sissy Spacek, Wilford Brimley, and Matt Damon. The film aired on TNT on March 5, 1995.

== Plot ==
An aging cowboy must choose between his desire to remain free and the responsibilities of maintaining a family.

== Cast ==
- Tommy Lee Jones as Hewey Calloway
- Terry Kinney as Walter Calloway
- Frances McDormand as Eve Calloway
- Sam Shepard as Snort Yarnell
- Sissy Spacek as Spring Renfro
- Joaquin Jackson as Sheriff Wes Wheeler
- Wilford Brimley as C.C. Tarpley
- Matt Damon as Cotton Calloway
- Walter Olkewicz as Frank (Fat) Gervin
- Blayne Weaver as Tommy Calloway
- Larry Mahan as Blue Hannigan
- Bruce McGill as City Marshall
- Margaret Bowman as Mrs. Faversham

== Production ==
Filming was in Alamo Village – Highway 674, Brackettville, Texas, Alpine, Texas, Del Rio, Texas, and Fort Davis, Texas.

== Release ==
The film debuted on TNT on March 5, 1995.

== Accolades ==
Sissy Spacek was nominated for a Primetime Emmy Award for Outstanding Supporting Actress in a Miniseries or a Movie at the 47th Primetime Emmy Awards in 1995, but lost to Judy Davis and Shirley Knight, who shared the award as co-winners for two separate TV movies.
