= Max (2015 film) =

- Theatrical release poster
- Directed by: Boaz Yakin
- Screenplay by: Boaz Yakin; Sheldon Lettich
- Produced by: Karen Rosenfelt; Ken Blancato
- Starring: Josh Wiggins; Lauren Graham; Thomas Haden Church
- Cinematography: Stefan Czapsky
- Edited by: Bill Pankow
- Music by: Trevor Rabin
- Production companies: Metro-Goldwyn-Mayer Pictures; RatPac-Dune Entertainment; Sunswept Entertainment
- Distributed by: Warner Bros. Pictures
- Release date: June 26, 2015 (United States)
- Running time: 111 minutes
- Country: United States
- Language: English
- Budget: $20 million
- Box office: $44 million

Max is a 2015 American family adventure war drama film directed by Boaz Yakin, and co-written with Sheldon Lettich. The film stars Josh Wiggins, Thomas Haden Church, Robbie Amell, Lauren Graham, Luke Kleintank, and Jay Hernandez. The film was released by Warner Bros. Pictures on June 26, 2015.

== Plot ==
Max, a Belgian Malinois military dog used to help U.S. Marines in Afghanistan, is handled by Kyle Wincott (Marine MWD). Kyle is questioned when weapons seized by his squad go missing. Realizing his friend Tyler Harne is among those involved with the shady dealings, he warns Tyler that he cannot cover for him. The two then go into the battlefield with their squad, with Max on point. While advancing on a suicide bomber, Max is injured by an explosion. In the ensuing gunfight, Kyle is shot and killed.

Kyle's brother Justin, who makes money selling illegally copied video games, their mother Pamela and their father Ray are informed of his death. After Kyle's body is brought home for burial, the other Marines notice that Max is only calm when he is around Justin, apparently sensing that he is Kyle's brother. The family adopts the dog, who would otherwise be euthanized for his disturbed behavior. Justin initially wants little to do with Max but eventually warms up to him. While meeting up with his friend Chuy, Justin meets Chuy's cousin Carmen, who offers to go to his house and show him some handling tricks for Max. Little by little, Max's behavior improves around other people.

Tyler visits the Wincotts one evening, provoking an aggressive response by Max. Later, after the Fourth of July, Ray asks Tyler what really happened. Tyler implies that Max turned on Kyle and caused him to discharge his weapon on himself, leading to his death. Justin decides to investigate the matter. He receives a DVD of Kyle training Max; he later contacts a friend of Kyle, Sergeant Reyes, for help.

Later, Justin is approached by Chuy's other cousin Emilio, a cartel member, who presses him over a video game bootleg. Afterwards, Justin and Max follow Emilio into the woods, where they secretly observe a meeting between cartel members and Tyler, who tries selling stolen weapons to them. The cartel's dogs sense Max and run after him. Max fights them off, severely wounding one of the dogs, while Justin runs away and leaves his bike behind. When he gets home, he finds Tyler and Stack, the cartel's dog handler, who was injured in the melee. Feigning innocence, they accuse Max of doing harm and demand his euthanization.

Max is taken by animal control officers but escapes. Meanwhile, Ray catches Tyler making a business deal with the cartel but is held hostage by Emilio. Max makes it home and leads Justin, Chuy, and Carmen into the woods to rescue Ray. Confronting the cartel, they incapacitate Emilio and the last cartel dog and rescue Ray. Tyler chases after Justin while Stack chases after Ray. During the chase, Stack is killed when Ray shoots at his off-road pickup truck and causes him to crash, making the truck explode and setting off all the ammo. Tyler corners Justin at a damaged bridge and is threatening to shoot him. Max distracts Tyler and allows Justin to knock Tyler off balance, which then allows Max to attack Tyler and save Justin's life. The two are knocked over the side of the bridge; while Tyler is killed by the fall, Max gets injured but survives. Afterwards, Emilio is arrested and sent to jail.

The family welcomes Max into their home. After Justin and Max visit Kyle's grave, they invite Chuy and Carmen over for dinner.

== Cast ==
- Josh Wiggins as Justin Wincott, Ray and Pamela's son and Kyle's brother
- Carlos as Max, the titular character. He is initially owned by Kyle, but after Kyle's death, he is owned by Kyle's brother Justin
- Dejon LaQuake as Chuy
- Thomas Haden Church as Raymond "Ray" Wincott, Pamela's ex-Marine husband and Kyle and Justin's father
- Robbie Amell as Kyle Wincott, Ray and Pamela's son and Justin's brother
- Lauren Graham as Pamela Wincott, Ray's wife and Kyle and Justin's mother
- Luke Kleintank as Tyler Harne
- Jay Hernandez as Sgt. Reyes
- Miles Mussenden as Major Miles
- Mia Xitlali as Carmen
- Owen Harn as Deputy Stack
- Joseph Julian Soria as Emilio

== Production ==
In May 2014, Variety reported that Boaz Yakin would direct the family film titled Max for Warner Bros. and Metro-Goldwyn-Mayer. Principal photography began in North Carolina on May 12, 2014.

== Release and reception ==
The film was scheduled for release in the United States on January 30, 2015. Then it was pushed back to August 21, 2015, and on March 3, 2015, it was moved two months forward to June 26, 2015.

=== Box office ===
In the United States and Canada, Max was released alongside Ted 2, and was projected to gross around $10 million from 2,850 theaters in its opening weekend. It earned $500,000 from its Thursday night showings and $4.3 million on its opening day (including the Thursday previews). Through its opening weekend, it grossed $12.2 million, fourth place among all films behind Jurassic World, Inside Out, and Ted 2.

=== Critical response ===
On Rotten Tomatoes, the film holds an approval rating of 37% based on 98 reviews, with an average rating of 4.8/10. The site's critics consensus reads: "Max has good intentions and tries to hearken back to classic family-friendly features, but its disjointed, manipulative plot overwhelms the efforts of its talented human and canine stars." Metacritic, which uses a weighted average, assigned the film a score of 47 out of 100, based on 25 critics, indicating "mixed or average" reviews. Audiences polled by CinemaScore gave the film an average grade of "A" on an A+ to F scale.

== Sequel ==
A sequel, Max 2: White House Hero, was released theatrically on May 5, 2017, digitally on May 9, and on Blu-ray and DVD on May 23.
