= Life in Flight =

- Directed by: Tracey Hecht
- Written by: Tracey Hecht
- Produced by: Pamela Hirsch; Celine Rattray; Galt Niederhoffer; Daniela Taplin Lundberg
- Starring: Patrick Wilson; Amy Smart; Lynn Collins; Rashida Jones
- Cinematography: Harlan Bosmajian
- Edited by: Peter Beaudreau; Craig McKay
- Music by: Anton Sanko
- Production company: Plum Pictures
- Distributed by: IFC Films
- Release dates: April 27, 2008 (Tribeca); November 30, 2010 (United States)
- Country: United States
- Language: English
- Budget: $2 million

Life in Flight is a 2008 romantic comedy-drama film written and directed by Tracey Hecht. Patrick Wilson stars as Will Sargent, an architect who begins to question the perfect life he has constructed for himself and his family when he meets urban designer Kate Voss (Lynn Collins). Amy Smart co-stars. It premiered at the Tribeca Film Festival on April 27, 2008, and was later released in the United States on November 30, 2010 by IFC Films.

== Plot ==
Will Sargent (Wilson) is an up-and-coming New York City architect, managing an important project and in the midst of negotiations to join an important firm. Will's wife Catherine (Smart) is riding his coattails, managing their social success. Their seven-year-old son, Nate (Rosseljong) feels the effects of their success when his activities are often pushed to the sidelines in light of the important deal his father is negotiating.

Will meets Kate Voss (Collins), a small-space designer, through mutual friends. Will has seen her work at his son's school, and encourages her to drop off her portfolio for him to recommend for a job he is connected with. The two meet on several occasions at several social functions and to discuss Kate's work, all the while Will neglects to mention that he is married.

Kate calls Will's home number by mistake, and speaks with his wife who encourages her to drop off her work at their house. When Kate drops by, she is astonished to find out not only is it Will's house and not a work location, but that he is married.

== Cast ==
- Patrick Wilson as Will Sargent
- Amy Smart as Catherine Sargent
- Lynn Collins as Kate Voss
- Frederick Weller as Kit
- Monique Gabriela Curnen as Janey
- Zak Orth as Josh
- Rashida Jones as Nina
- Janet Zarish as Pamela
- Stephanie Szostak as Alex
- Troy Britton Johnson as Stewart
- Kevin Rosseljong as Nate Sargent
- Quincy Tyler Bernstine as Cali
- Jennifer Smolos as Cynthia
- Tim Miller as City Planning Head
- Alix Elias as Waitress
- Kelly Nyks as Aidan

== Release ==
The film premiered as an official selection at the 2008 Tribeca Film Festival. It was released almost three years later in the United States, on November 30, 2010, by IFC Films.
