= The Sideways Light =

- Digital release poster
- Directed by: Jennifer Harlow
- Written by: Jennifer Harlow
- Produced by: Jennifer Harlow; Mark Reeb; Jenny Goddard-Garcia
- Starring: Lindsay Burdge; Annalee Jefferies; Matthew Newton; Mark Reeb
- Cinematography: Jay Keitel
- Edited by: Don Swaynos
- Music by: Daniel Hart
- Production company: The Sho
- Distributed by: Indican Pictures
- Release dates: October 23, 2014 (Austin Film Festival); March 1, 2016 (United States)
- Running time: 85 minutes
- Country: United States
- Language: English

The Sideways Light is a 2014 American mystery drama film, written and directed by Jennifer Harlow. It stars Lindsay Burdge, Annalee Jefferies, Matthew Newton and Mark Reeb. The film had its world premiere at the Austin Film Festival on October 23, 2014. The film was released on video on demand on March 1, 2016, by Indican Pictures.

== Premise ==
Lily is haunted by memories, meanwhile her mother Ruth is forgetting her own memories.

== Cast ==
- Lindsay Burdge as Lily
  - Bryn Langhout as Young Lily
- Annalee Jefferies as Ruth
- Matthew Newton as Aiden
- Mark Reeb as Sam
- Jeanne Evans as Nana
- Rocco Sisto as The Doctor

== Release ==
The film had its world premiere at the Austin Film Festival on October 23, 2014. The film went onto screen at the Lone Star Film Festival, and Atlanta Film and Video Festival, In August 2015, Harlow revealed on her Instagram account, she had signed a distribution deal for the film. The distribution later turned out to be Indican Pictures. The film was released on video on demand on March 1, 2016.
