= The Young Girl and the Monsoon =

- Directed by: James Ryan
- Written by: James Ryan
- Produced by: Monsoon Productions
- Starring: Terry Kinney; Ellen Muth; Mili Avital; Tim Guinee; Diane Venora
- Cinematography: Benjamin Wolf
- Music by: David Carbonara
- Release dates: October 25, 1999 (AFI Film Festival); April 27, 2001
- Running time: 90 minutes
- Country: United States
- Language: English

The Young Girl and the Monsoon is a 1999 American comedy-drama film from Monsoon Productions and starring Terry Kinney and Ellen Muth. Writer-director James Ryan won Best Screenplay and the Gold Medal at the Wine Country Film Festival in 2000 for the film.

== Plot ==
The Young Girl and the Monsoon centers around a fraught relationship between father and daughter. Hank, a 39-year-old photo-journalist (Kinney), has agreed to look after his 13-year-old daughter, Constance (Muth), for several weeks while his ex-wife goes on a holiday with her new husband. Hank has compartmentalized his life in such a way that his daughter doesn't know anything about his 26-year-old girlfriend, Erin (Avital). Suddenly Erin wants to marry Hank and have his children, but he can't cope, and drops her.

Just as Hank has a chance of winning a prestigious journalistic award, he finds his private life a little too much to handle. His daughter cannot understand how he can take war photographs and not do anything about what he photographs. She is going through the emotional swings of a growing adolescent.

== Cast ==
- Terry Kinney as Hank
- Ellen Muth as Constance
- Mili Avital as Erin
- Tim Guinee as Jack
- Diane Venora as Giovanna

== Release ==
The film was first shown at the AFI Film Festival on 25 October 1999, then at the Santa Barbara Film Festival on 4 March 2000, followed by the Los Angeles Independent Film Festival on 15 April 2000. It was released in New York City on 4 May 2001.
