= The Magic of Belle Isle =

2012 film directed by Rob Reiner

- Theatrical release poster
- Directed by: Rob Reiner
- Written by: Guy Thomas; Rob Reiner; Andrew Scheinman
- Produced by: Jared Ian Goldman; Salli Newman; David Valdes; Rob Reiner; Alan Greisman; Lori McCreary
- Starring: Morgan Freeman; Virginia Madsen; Emma Fuhrmann; Madeline Carroll; Kenan Thompson; Kevin Pollak; Fred Willard; Nicolette Pierini
- Cinematography: Reed Morano
- Edited by: Dorian Harris
- Music by: Marc Shaiman
- Production companies: Castle Rock Entertainment; Revelations Entertainment; Summer Magic; Firebrand; Voltage Pictures
- Distributed by: Magnolia Pictures
- Release date: July 6, 2012
- Running time: 109 minutes
- Country: United States
- Language: English
- Budget: $5 million
- Box office: $102,388

The Magic of Belle Isle (released in the United Kingdom as Once More) is a 2012 comedy-drama film directed by Rob Reiner and written by Guy Thomas. The film stars Morgan Freeman, Virginia Madsen, Emma Fuhrmann, Madeline Carroll, Kenan Thompson, Nicolette Pierini, Kevin Pollak and Fred Willard. The film was released on July 6, 2012, by Magnolia Pictures.

== Plot ==
Grumpy Monte Wildhorn is brought to spend the summer at a lakeside cabin in Belle Isle by his nephew Henry, who's friends with the owner. Monte is a famous Western novelist. Struggling with the loss of his wife to cancer six years earlier has sapped his passion for writing and driven him to drink heavily.

Monte eventually befriends the family next door, attractive single mother Charlotte O'Neil and her three young daughters, teen Willow, middle child Finn and Flor. Willow, the eldest, is constantly on her cell, Finn is mischievous and Flor is naïve.

Shortly after arriving, a resident drops dead. Another neighbor asks Monte to read the pre-prepared eulogy. Afterwards, he meets Finn, who asks him to teach her three new words for her mom, then how to write as her mentor. He teaches her through example, making up a story on the spot, which she believes.

When Monte is invited to the O'Neils for dinner, Finn shows she has learned well the vocabulary he taught her. Charlotte indirectly asks him about love, and he basically says his wife was the love of his life. Later Monte has a dream about dancing with Charlotte.

Not only does the writer subtly influence people in town, but they help him find inspiration again. Finn spontaneously coming up with a story stimulates him to write a story for Flor, and then another.

One day in late August, Charlotte asks Monte to watch the girls while she finalizes her divorce in NYC. They bond, and he tells Finn how he ended up in a wheelchair, how he met the love of his life, and how he started writing. Shortly thereafter he says his goodbyes.

Months pass and Monte has returned to Belle Isle. After selling the movie rights to his Western books, he is able to buy the house next door, and the O'Neils welcome his return.

== Cast ==
- Morgan Freeman as Monte Wildhorn
- Virginia Madsen as Charlotte O'Neil
- Madeline Carroll as Willow O'Neil, Charlotte's first daughter
- Kenan Thompson as Henry, Monte's nephew
- Emma Fuhrmann as Finnegan "Finn" O'Neil, Charlotte's second daughter
- Kevin Pollak as Joe Viola
- Fred Willard as Al Kaiser
- Jessica Hecht as Karen Loop
- Lucas Rooney as Clown
- Ash Christian as Carl Loop, Karen's son
- Nicolette Pierini as Flora "Flor" O'Neil, Charlotte's third daughter
- Boyd Holbrook as Luke Ford

== Production ==
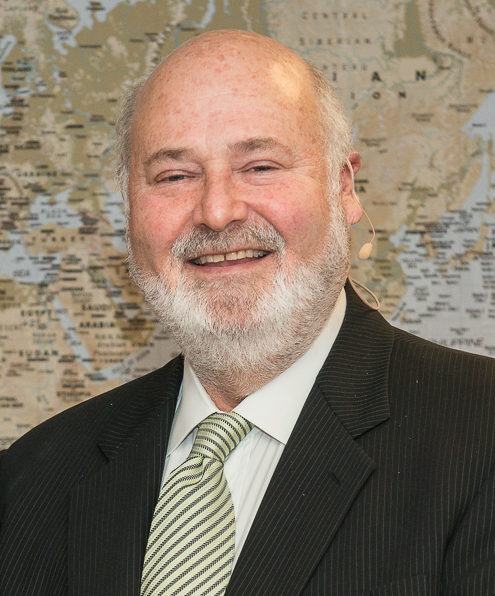
Rob Reiner in 2013

The Magic of Belle Isle was filmed in the village of Greenwood Lake, New York, in July 2011.

== Reception ==
The Magic of Belle Isle received mixed reviews from critics according to Rotten Tomatoes where the film has a rating of 30%, based on 33 reviews, with a rating of 4.9/10. The website's critics consensus reads, "Neither Rob Reiner nor Morgan Freeman are able to conjure up their old magic in this dull trifle, with both director and star appearing content to tread through the paces of the saccharine script." On Metacritic, the film has a score of 46 out of 100, based on 14 critics, indicating "mixed or average reviews".

== Home media ==
The film was released on DVD and Blu-ray on September 18, 2012.
