= Lost in the Sun =

- Theatrical release poster
- Directed by: Trey Nelson
- Written by: Trey Nelson
- Produced by: Clay Floren; Clay Pecorin; Chris Robert; A.J. Shah; Aimee Shieh
- Starring: Josh Duhamel; Josh Wiggins; Lynn Collins; Emma Fuhrmann
- Cinematography: Robert Barocci
- Edited by: Mike Choi
- Music by: Daniel Hart
- Production company: Floren Shieh Productions
- Distributed by: Entertainment One Distribution
- Release date: November 6, 2015 (United States)
- Running time: 95 minutes
- Country: United States
- Language: English

Lost in the Sun is a 2015 drama thriller film written and directed by Trey Nelson, and starring Josh Duhamel, Josh Wiggins, Lynn Collins, and Emma Fuhrmann.

== Synopsis ==
Louis, a newly orphaned teenager, becomes John's unlikely accomplice. As they progress on the open road, John drags Louis on a crime spree; committing a string of armed robberies, ultimately causing the pair to forge an unexpected and powerful bond.

The story takes the idea of an endless path of a pair of desperados. The film appears to have been shot in the arid southwest of America, such as Arizona or New Mexico. The perfunctory theater release was followed by a DVD release.

== Cast ==
- Josh Duhamel as John Wheeler
- Josh Wiggins as Louis Moody
- Lynn Collins as Mary Wheeler
- Emma Fuhrmann as Rose Moody
- Larry Jack Dotson as Father Walker
- Mylinda Royer as Laura Moody
- Michael Anthony Jackson as Freddy
- Luis Olmeda as Gilbert
- Brian Elder as Store Clerk
- David Lambert as Store Owner
- Robert Johnson as Bank Guard
- Margaret Bowman as Ivy
