= Margaret Bowman =

American actor (1928–2018)

- Born: February 14, 1928
- Died: August 13, 2018 (aged 90); Humble, Texas, United States
- Occupation: Actor
- Years active: 1989–2018

Margaret Bowman (February 14, 1928 – August 13, 2018) was an American actress.

== Career ==
Bowman's early career included musical theater in Nashville, Tennessee, and Stages Repertory Theater in Houston, Texas. A method actor, she first took acting classes at her local YMCA while in her 50s, when she "decided to reinvent" herself after spending the first part of her adult life as a homemaker. She later was accepted into the American Academy of Dramatic Arts in Pasadena, California.

Bowman was primarily a character actor for film and television. Her first on-screen role was Mrs. Flora Hawkins in The Fulfillment of Mary Gray (1989). Between 1989 and her death in 2018, Bowman primarily appeared in bit roles, such as Old Nanny in three episodes of A Woman of Independent Means (1995), and as Fat Lady in The Lone Ranger (2013). Bowman spent her free time observing people and inventing backstories for the characters she imagined they were, saying, "If you want to be a good character actor, you have to observe the people around you." In 1995, Bowman was cast by Tommy Lee Jones in the TNT TV movie The Good Old Boys, as "an old woman, Mrs. Faversham, whose mind has gone." Jones, who had a reputation for being cantankerous, called her work "exquisite".

One of her most notable roles was as the "T-Bone Waitress" in the critically acclaimed film Hell or High Water (2016). Bowman said she "had the character in mind before [she] even auditioned." She based the character partly on her favorite waitress and partly on her own mother, who "waited tables to support herself, her mother, and three daughters" and "then I came along and waited tables to support my family many years ago, so I know what it's like to stand all day and have your back hurt and your feet hurt." In an interview with the Houston Chronicle, the newspaper described her performance as "scene-stealing." The Los Angeles Times said, "She may be an unnamed waitress in Hell or High Water's diner scene, but, boy, does she leave an impression." Actor Michael McKean said, "it's one of the most hilarious scenes on film this year. There's an actress named Margaret Bowman, who had a bit part in Waiting for Guffman. But in this, she just nails the world's worst dragon waitress. You just fall in love with her. She has one little scene and she kind of steals the picture."

== Personal life ==
Bowman raised six children with her husband, Jay, to whom she was married for 68 years.

She sang bass in a barbershop quartet for "many years".

== Filmography ==
Year	Title	Role	Notes
1989	Dream Date	Woman in Hotel Room	TV movie
1989	The Fulfillment of Mary Gray	Mrs. Flora Hawkins	TV movie
1990	The Hot Spot	Woman at Gas Station	Film
1991	Hard Promises	Walt's Mom	Film
1991	Final Verdict	Neighbor	TV movie
1992	Leap of Faith	Woman with Cherries Hat	Film
1992	Unsolved Mysteries	Dorothy Lang	Episode #5.12, playing the mother of Matthew McConaughey's character
1992	Simple Men	Nurse Louise	Film
1993	A Perfect World	Trick 'r Treat Lady	Film
1993	Ned Blessing: The Story of My Life and Times		Episode: "A Ghost Story"
1995	In the Name of Love: A Texas Tragedy	Landlady	TV movie
1995	Walker, Texas Ranger	Wife	Episode: "Case Closed"
1995	The Good Old Boys	Mrs. Faversham	TV movie
1995	A Woman of Independent Means	Old Nanny	TV Miniseries - 3 episodes
1996	Waiting for Guffman	Costumer Designer	Film
1999	A Slipping-Down Life	Mrs. Harrison	Film
2007	No Country for Old Men	Del Rio Motel Clerk	Film
2009	Night Nurse	Hospital Orderly	Short
2010	Chase	Greta	Episode: "Repo"
2011	Bernie	Townsperson	Film
2012	Dallas	Miss Henderson	Episode: "The Last Hurrah"
2013	The Lone Ranger	Fat Lady	Film
2015	Lost in the Sun	Ivy	Film
2016	Longmire	Ethel	Episode: "Pure Peckinpah"
2016	Hell or High Water	T-Bone Waitress	Film
2019	Trading Paint	Martha (as Margaret A. Bowman)	Film
