= Stella Baker =

American actress (born 1993)

Stella Breeze Baker
- Born: August 8, 1993 (age 33); Australia
- Occupation: Actress
- Years active: 2014–present
- Parent(s): Simon Baker (father); Rebecca Rigg (mother)

Stella Baker (born August 8, 1993) is an American actress, best known for her roles in the television series The Republic of Sarah and Tell Me Your Secrets (both 2021).

== Early life and career ==
She was born on August 8, 1993 in Australia to actors Simon Baker and Rebecca Rigg, and grew up in Los Angeles, California. Her first acting role was in a play in her early 20s. She moved to Portland for college and attended the Yale School of Drama, graduating in 2018.

She first appeared as a guest in the 2nd episode of the final season of her father's show The Mentalist. Subsequently, she appeared in a number of shorts, one of which she also wrote and produced, before being cast in the thriller drama series Tell Me Your Secrets as Theresa Barlow.

She played Sarah Cooper in The CW's The Republic of Sarah for its only season in 2021.

== Filmography ==
=== Television ===
Year	Title	Role	Notes
2014	The Mentalist	Angry Inmate	Episode: "The Greybar Hotel"
2021	Tell Me Your Secrets	Theresa Barlow	8 episodes
2021	The Republic of Sarah	Sarah Cooper	Main role
2022	The Good Fight	Susan Tremont	Episode: "The End of STR Laurie"
2023	Walker: Independence	Charlotte 'Charlie' Collins	Episode: "The Death of Mary Collins"

== Awards and nominations ==
Year	Award	Work	Category	Result
2020	Brooklyn Horror Film Festival	The Three Men You Meet at Night	Best Performance, Home Invasion	Won
