= Coast (film) =

- Directed by: Jessica Hester; Derek Schweickart
- Written by: Cindy Kitagawa
- Starring: Melissa Leo
- Release date: April 8, 2022
- Running time: 96 minutes
- Country: United States
- Language: English

Coast is a 2022 American drama film written by Cindy Kitagawa, directed by Jessica Hester and Derek Schweickart and starring Melissa Leo.

== Cast ==
- Fátima Ptacek as Abby Evans
- Mia Rose Frampton as Kristi Lewis
- Mia Xitlali as Kat Acosta
- Kane Ritchotte as Dave
- Ciara Bravo as Cassie
- Melissa Leo as Olivia
- Cristela Alonzo as Debora Avila

== Release ==
The film was released in theaters and on VOD on April 8, 2022.

== Reception ==
The film has a 71% rating on Rotten Tomatoes based on seventeen reviews.

Alex Saveliev of Film Threat rated the film a 6 out of 10.

Richard Whittaker of The Austin Chronicle awarded the film two stars out of five.
