= Two Against Time =

- Promotional image
- Genre: Drama
- Written by: Casey Kurtti; Peter Nelson
- Directed by: David Anspaugh
- Starring: Marlo Thomas; Ellen Muth; Peter Friedman; Karen Robinson; Joe Penny
- Music by: David Shire
- Country of origin: United States
- Original language: English

Production
- Executive producers: Carol Abrams; Adrienne Levin; Marlo Thomas
- Producer: Lynn Raynor
- Production location: Toronto
- Cinematography: Johnny E. Jensen
- Editor: Christopher Cibelli
- Running time: 100 minutes
- Production companies: Columbia TriStar Television; Let's Pretend Productions; Open Road Productions

Original release
- Network: CBS
- Release: April 21, 2002

Two Against Time is a 2002 American drama television film starring Marlo Thomas and Ellen Muth. It was directed by David Anspaugh and written by Casey Kurtti and Peter Nelson. The film originally aired on CBS on April 21, 2002.

== Plot ==
A mother and her daughter are diagnosed with cancer and the struggle against the illness will set them close and help to overcome old antagonisms.

== Cast ==
- Marlo Thomas as Julie Portman
- Ellen Muth as Emma Portman
- Peter Friedman as Robert Portman
- Karen Robinson as Connie Matthews
- Joe Penny as George Tomich
- Troy Hall as Michael Portman

== Production ==
Filming took place in Toronto.

== Reception ==
Andy Webb from The Movie Scene gave the film three out of five stars, stating: "What this all boils down to is that I am still conflicted by "Two Against Time" because of the mix of heart-breaking and heart-warming which ends up causing the gritty drama to be softened. But it is a powerful story, powerfully acted and a movie which whilst may leave you as conflicted as I am, is well worth a watch." David Parkinson from Radio Times gave the movie only one out of five stars and wrote: "It's a cheap jibe to dismiss TV movies as "disease of the week" fodder. Unfortunately, this drama from director David Anspaugh ticks all the boxes. It's based on a true story and not only has two people battling against cancer, but, to make matters all the more lachrymose, they're a single mother and her rebellious teenage daughter." Steven Oxman from Variety said about Two Against Time: "TV movies are dead, you know. They don't make them anymore. At least not the traditional ones. Admirably capable of exhausting a year's supply of tissues in a single sitting, "Two Against Time" will be a miracle cure for fans of this shamelessly sappy genre in its death throes." Tom Shales from The Washington Post criticized almost every aspect of the film, stating: "There have been many TV movies about the emotional and physical ravages of serious illness, most of them more sensitive than this one. Those who made "Two Against Time" imagine we've never seen any of those films and that hair loss from chemotherapy is going to come as a shock. There are worlds and worlds of difference between a lackluster movie like this and HBO's "Wit," in which Emma Thompson so memorably and unflinchingly played a terminal cancer patient."
