= The Bachelors (2017 film) =

2017 American comedy drama

- Directed by: Kurt Voelker
- Written by: Kurt Voelker
- Produced by: Matthew Baer; George Parra; Joseph McKelheer; Bill Kiely
- Starring: J. K. Simmons; Julie Delpy; Josh Wiggins; Odeya Rush
- Cinematography: Antonio Riestra
- Edited by: Anita Brandt-Burgoyne
- Music by: Joel P. West
- Production companies: Matt Baer Films; Windowseat Entertainment
- Distributed by: Freestyle Releasing
- Release dates: June 20, 2017 (LAFF); October 20, 2017 (United States)
- Country: United States
- Language: English
- Box office: $106,212

The Bachelors is an American comedy drama film directed and written by Kurt Voelker. The film stars J. K. Simmons, Julie Delpy, Josh Wiggins and Odeya Rush. Principal photography began on March 14, 2016 in Los Angeles. It premiered at the Los Angeles Film Festival on June 20, 2017. It was theatrically released on October 20, 2017.

== Plot ==
After the early death of his wife, mourning father Bill Palet moves with his teenage son, Wes, across the country for a private school teaching job in southern California. At first they struggle to contain their feelings of loss, but Wes's new French teacher, Carine Roussel, stirs both toward slow change: Wes, through a homework partnership with Lacy, who's fighting depression over her parents' bitter marital collapse; and, Bill, through an unexpected liaison with Carine. Bill and Wes fight through lingering grief with Carine's and Lacy's help and begin to let go of their grief and love again, with the climactic ice cream double-date between the two couples implying happiness to be for them.

== Cast ==
- J. K. Simmons as Bill Palet
- Josh Wiggins as Wes Palet
- Odeya Rush as Lacy Westman
- Kevin Dunn as Paul Abernac
- Julie Delpy as Carine Roussel
- Harold Perrineau as Dr. Rollens
- Kimberly Crandall as Jeanie Palet
- Tyrel Jackson Williams as Raffi Akka
- Jae Head as Gober

== Production ==
On November 3, 2015, it was announced that Kurt Voelker would direct a comedy-drama film The Bachelors based on his own script, starring J. K. Simmons as a widower. On February 8, 2016, Julie Delpy joined the film. On March 9, 2016, Josh Wiggins and Odeya Rush were cast in the film. Producers on the film would be Matthew Baer and George Parra with Windowseat Entertainment's Joseph McKelheer and Bill Kiely, and Windowseat also fully financing the film.

Principal photography on the film began on March 14, 2016 in Los Angeles, California.

== Reception ==
The Bachelors has grossed a total worldwide of $106,212 On review aggregator website Rotten Tomatoes, the film holds an approval rating of 84% based on 19 reviews, and an average rating of 6.35/10. On Metacritic, the film has a weighted average score of 54 out of 100, based on 4 critics, indicating "mixed or average reviews".

=== Accolades ===
The film won the Best Narrative Feature Award at the 2017 San Diego International Film Festival.
