= Nicolette Pierini =

American child actress (born 2003)

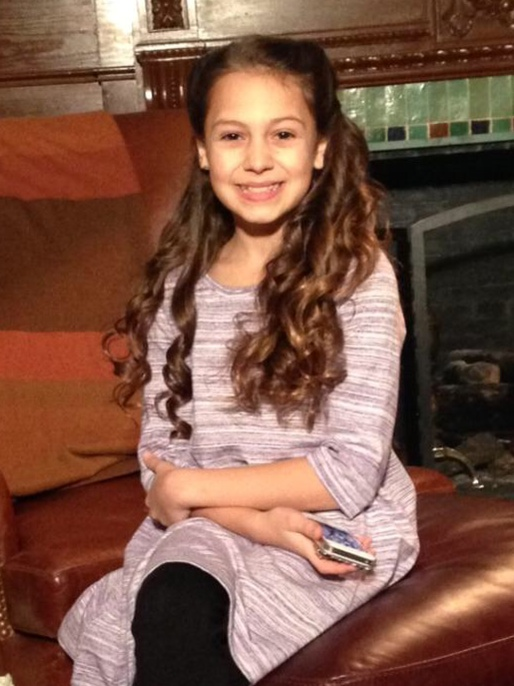
- Pierini in 2015
- Born: December 30, 2003 (age 22); Long Island, New York, U.S.
- Occupation: Actress
- Years active: 2008–present
- Website: Nicolette Pierini on Facebook

Nicolette Pierini (/piːəˈriːni/; born December 30, 2003) is an American actress. She was first noticed for her role in The Magic of Belle Isle (2012), opposite Morgan Freeman, and is known for the 2014 film adaptation of the musical Annie, where she played Mia Putnam.

== Early life ==
Pierini was born in Long Island, New York, as the youngest of four children. She was inspired to become an actress after helping her sister Marisa to prepare for school plays. Together she and her brother Anthony would help by performing the other characters in play scripts, and by playing improvisational games with her. At the age of four, Pierini appeared in an episode of the IFC comedy Z Rock as Nicolette. She began taking improvisation, singing and dancing lessons from seven years of age.

== Career ==
Pierini began working an actress in short independent films and commercials. In 2009 to 2011, she was the announcer of Nick’s Play Date, the 2009-2014 re-branding of the Nick Jr. block on Nickelodeon, due to Nick Jr. being a 24-hour channel. She announced up next interstitials, and drawing galleries. In 2012 she was featured her first roles in major productions, including a recurring role on the drama Made in Jersey and as different characters in the hidden camera show Primetime: What Would You Do?. In the same year, Pierini worked alongside Morgan Freeman in the film The Magic of Belle Isle, where she played Flora. In 2013, Pierini was featured in episodes of Law & Order: Special Victims Unit, Golden Boy and Blue Bloods, as well as the Joey Dedio film Tio Papi.

In September 2013, Pierini was announced as a castmember for the 2014 adaptation of the musical Annie opposite Jamie Foxx, Quvenzhané Wallis and Cameron Diaz. Pierini landed the role after she completed five rounds of auditions. On the film's soundtrack, Pierini sung three songs, "Maybe", "It's the Hard Knock Life", and back-up vocals in the reprise of "Tomorrow". While promoting Annie, Pierini performed with the cast at the 2014 Macy's Thanksgiving Day Parade, and appeared with the cast at the 2014 Kids' Choice Awards.

== Personal life ==
Pierini's brother Anthony is a Broadway actor, appearing as an alternate in the productions of Mary Poppins from 2012 to 2013, the 25th anniversary U.S. national tour Les Misérables from 2011 to 2012 and Big Fish in 2013.

== Filmography ==
Film roles
| Year | Title | Role | Notes |
|---|---|---|---|
| 2009 | Tran·si·tions | Scout | Short film |
| 2010 | Poetry Man | Megan's Daughter | Short film |
| 2010 | All That Remains | Young Katie | Short film |
| 2012 | The Magic of Belle Isle | Flora "Flor" O'Neil | |
| 2012 | The Evil's Gate | Samantha | Short film |
| 2013 | Tio Papi | Lola | |
| 2013 | Fool's Day | Little Girl | Short film |
| 2014 | Dirty Shield | Susan | |
| 2014 | Annie | Mia Putnam | Also featured on soundtrack |
| 2017 | Like Me | Julia | |

Television roles
| Year | Title | Role | Notes |
|---|---|---|---|
| 2008 | Z Rock | Nicolette | 1 episode |
| 2010 | Growing Up Twisted | As herself | Episode: "Mommy's Boys"; Uncredited |
| 2012 | Made in Jersey | Annika Keenan | 5 episodes |
| 2012–2017 | Primetime: What Would You Do? | Various | 8 episodes |
| 2013 | Golden Boy | Abigail Brunell | Episode: "The Price of Revenge" |
| 2013 | Dora the Explorer | Kitten (voice) | Episode: "Kittens in Mittens" |
| 2013 | Law & Order: Special Victims Unit | Sofia Santiago | Episode: "Presumed Guilty" |
| 2015 | Blue Bloods | Penelope Drake | Episode: "In The Box" |
| 2016 | The Daily Show | 'Congress The Game' Kid | Episode: "Anthony Mackie" |
| 2017 | Marvel's The Punisher | Lisa Castle | Recurring |
| 2018 | Law & Order: Special Victims Unit | Zoe | Episode: "Dare" |
| 2019 | Orange Is the New Black | Juana | Episode: "Minority Deport" |
