= Giant Little Ones =

2018 Canadian drama film

- Film poster
- Directed by: Keith Behrman
- Written by: Keith Behrman
- Produced by: Allison Black
- Starring: Josh Wiggins; Darren Mann; Taylor Hickson; Kyle MacLachlan; Maria Bello
- Cinematography: Guy Godfree
- Edited by: Sandy Pereira
- Music by: Michael Brook
- Production companies: euclid431 pictures Scythia Films; Storyboard Entertainment; Sugar Shack Productions
- Distributed by: Mongrel Media
- Release dates: September 9, 2018 (TIFF); March 1, 2019 (United States)
- Running time: 93 mins
- Country: Canada
- Language: English
- Box office: $166,896

Giant Little Ones is a 2018 Canadian drama film written and directed by Keith Behrman. The film stars Josh Wiggins, Kyle MacLachlan and Maria Bello as a teenage boy and his parents, whose lives are upended after the boy and his male best friend are involved in an intimate incident after a party.

The film was shot in Sault Ste. Marie, Ontario, in 2017. It premiered on September 9 at the 2018 Toronto International Film Festival, and received a limited release in the United States on March 1, 2019. In December 2018, the TIFF named the film to its annual year-end Canada's Top Ten list. Behrman won the Vancouver Film Critics Circle award for Best Screenplay for a Canadian Film.

== Plot ==
Ray Winter leaves his wife, Carly, for another man. Ray's popular, athletic son, Franky, refuses to talk to his father despite Ray's pleas. Some time later, Franky is about to celebrate his birthday. (Note: Sources differ as to whether he is turning 16 or 17 years old.) His best friend, fellow swimmer Ballas Kohl, pressures Franky to sleep with his girlfriend Priscilla just as Ballas and his girlfriend, Jess, have done. Ballas boasts of having had sex repeatedly. After Franky's birthday party and while intoxicated, Ballas and Franky have a sexual experience with each other. Ballas is terrified that his actions have outed him, and he and his girlfriend begin to spread rumors that Franky acted solely and performed unwanted oral sex while Ballas was sleeping. This results in Priscilla angrily confronting Franky and breaking up with him without allowing him to explain what had really happened.

Ballas' and Franky's friendship falls apart in the weeks that follow, with everyone in school believing that Franky is gay. This causes him to abandon the swim team and spend more time alone with himself. Only his gender questioning friend Mouse and Ballas' sister Natasha, who was also branded as an outcast after being sexually assaulted at a party, know the truth about what had happened between the two boys after the party and that Ballas had initially come on to him. Natasha and Franky form a close relationship with each other, which angers Ballas and causes him to threaten Franky to stay away from his sister.

Ballas damages Franky's bike, but is eventually forced to pay for the bike's repair by his parents. Franky steals his bike in retaliation, later claiming to not know the bike's whereabouts. Ballas then tries lying to Natasha, saying that Franky is only using her to prove he's straight, but she refuses to believe him. When this doesn't work, he drunkenly confronts Franky outside a convenience store and berates him, beating him up before running away. This results in the police being called.

Franky slowly begins to piece his life back together with the support of Mouse and rejoins the swim team. He also rekindles his relationship with Natasha, much to the chagrin of Priscilla, having also learned the truth about Franky. Franky reconnects with Ray, and admits that he is uncertain about his sexuality, as he did not feel uncomfortable during the incident with Ballas. Ray, who is gay and only came out long into adulthood, points out that he may not know his full truth yet, but he need not rush to immediately define himself. Through this guidance and the support of his family and friends, Franky finds himself confident in moving forward in life.

Some time later, it is revealed that Franky had broken apart Ballas' bike into parts and hid it away. He builds it back together with Ray's help and returns it to Ballas' house, alongside a dog tag necklace Jess gave to Ballas and he had lost during Franky's birthday party. As Franky leaves on his bike he fires a flare gun Ballas gave to him as a birthday present, which Ballas and Natasha see from afar.

== Cast ==
- Josh Wiggins as Franky Winter
- Darren Mann as Ballas Kohl, Franky's lifelong best friend
- Taylor Hickson as Natasha Kohl, Ballas's sister and Franky's new friend
- Kyle MacLachlan as Ray Winter, Franky's father
- Maria Bello as Carly Winter, Franky's mother
- Peter Outerbridge as Nic Kohl
- Niamh Wilson as Mouse, Franky's friend, who is themselves gender questioning
- Kiana Madeira as Jess, Ballas' girlfriend and later ex-girlfriend
- Hailey Kittle as Priscilla, Franky's girlfriend and later ex-girlfriend
- Stephanie Moore as Angie Kohl
- Evan Marsh as Connor
- Olivia Scriven as Deanne Winter, Franky's sister
- Carson MacCormac as Michael, a bullied boy

== Critical response ==
On the review aggregator website Rotten Tomatoes, 93% of 61 critics' reviews are positive. The website's consensus reads: "Giant Little Ones puts a complex and refreshingly nuanced spin on the traditional coming of age drama, further elevated by the admirable efforts of a talented cast." On Metacritic, the film has a weighted average score of 67 out of 100, based on 17 critics, indicating "generally favorable reviews".

Writing for CBC Arts in his regular Queeries column on LGBTQ entertainment, Peter Knegt praised the film as part of a rising and necessary trend of honest depictions of teenage sexuality and sexual identity issues. He wrote that the film "feels like something of an antidote to last year's gay teen rom-com Love, Simon, which felt like it barely scratched the surface of what its characters were going through."

== See also ==
- List of LGBT-related films of 2018
- List of drama films of the 2010s
- List of Canadian films of 2018
