= Ellen Muth =

American actress (born 1981)

Ellen Anna Muth
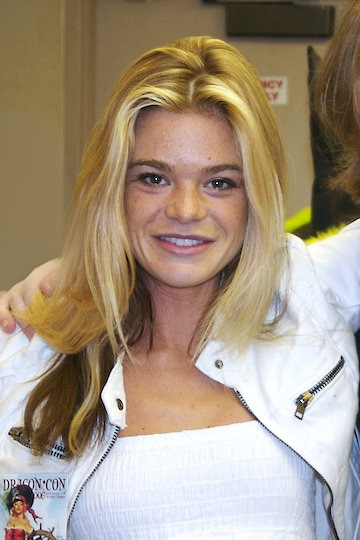
- Muth in 2006
- Born: March 6, 1981 (age 45); Milford, Connecticut, U.S.
- Occupation: Actress
- Years active: 1993–2013, 2022

Ellen Muth (/ˈmjuːθ/; born March 6, 1981) is an American retired actress best known for her role as Georgia "George" Lass in Showtime's series Dead Like Me (2003–2004 series, 2009 film).

== Early life ==
Muth was born in Milford, Connecticut, to Eric and Rachel Muth.

As of 2004, Muth was a member of Intertel and Mensa, high-IQ societies. She attended the Skip Barber Racing School and the Lee Strasberg Theatre and Film Institute.

== Career ==
After a brief stint as a model with Ford Models and Rascal's Agency, Muth pursued a career in acting, studying at the Lee Strasberg Theatre and Film Institute in New York City, and getting her first professional experience doing commercials in 1993. Her first major role was in the 1995 film Dolores Claiborne. She followed that with a role in the eighth-season premiere of Law & Order.

Muth's appearance as the daughter in the 1999 film The Young Girl and the Monsoon earned praise from Stephen Holden of The New York Times for her range in portraying a character "who one minute can be as clinging as a baby and the next delights in cruelly demolishing the nearest grownup with laser-like sarcasm" and her chemistry "whenever Constance (who narrates the film) is on the screen with her father Hank (Terry Kinney)".

Her 2000 work included appearances in episodes of The Beat and Law & Order: Special Victims Unit, as well as a role in The American Collection adaptation of "Cora Unashamed", a short story by Langston Hughes from his 1934 collection The Ways of White Folks. Muth also had a guest role in "Don't Ask", the original unaired pilot episode of the 2000 Fox show that eventually aired as Normal, Ohio. The show's revamp eliminated her role. That year, Muth played the lead in the Lifetime Original Movie The Truth About Jane about a high school girl's struggle with her sexuality and acceptance.

Muth starred in the 2003–04 Showtime television series Dead Like Me in the role of Georgia "George" Lass, the protagonist and one of a team of grim reapers.

Muth's next roles were lower in profile. She appeared in Jack 'n' Jill, a 2007 MFA thesis film. She voiced the character of Addie Vost in the first animated short of Tofu the Vegan Zombie and a character in the audio dramatization "Anne Manx in the Empress Blair Project". In September 2008 she joined three other actors at the Theatre Artist Workshop in Norwalk, Connecticut, in a reading of Fleece the Flock, an original musical comedy in development and directed by Joel Vig.

After some delay, Dead Like Me: Life After Death, a film directed by Stephen Herek based on Dead Like Me and featuring many members of the show's cast, including Muth, was released direct-to-video in March 2009.

In 2012, Muth returned to the big screen in the romantic comedy Margarine Wars alongside Robert Loggia and Doris Roberts. The film debuted in Los Angeles on March 29, 2012.

In 2013, Muth made a guest appearance in two episodes of the first season of the TV series Hannibal, produced by Bryan Fuller, the creator of Dead Like Me.

In a 2015 interview, Muth confirmed that she had "hit the pause button on the acting" part of her life. In 2022, Muth portrayed Natalie in Exorcism of Fleete Marish.

== Awards and nominations ==
Muth shared a best supporting actress award at the 1995 Tokyo International Film Festival for her screen debut in Dolores Claiborne. In 1999 she won the American Film Institute (AFI) Best Actress Award for The Young Girl and the Monsoon.

In 2004, Muth's work on Dead Like Me received two nominations: for a Saturn Award in the Best Actress in a Television Series category and for a Satellite Award in the category of Best Performance by an Actress in a Drama series.

== Filmography ==
=== Film ===
Year	Title	Role	Notes
1995	Dolores Claiborne	Young Selena St. George	Tokyo International Film Festival Award for Best Supporting Actress
1999	The Young Girl and the Monsoon	Constance	AFI Award for Best Actress
2001	Rain	Jenny	
2002	A Gentleman's Game	Mollie Kilduff	
2007	Tofu the Vegan Zombie in Zombie Dearest	Addie Vost	Short film
2008	Jack N Jill	Jill	Short film
2009	Dead Like Me: Life After Death	George Lass	Video
2011	Rose and Violet	Rose	Short film
2012	Margarine Wars	Katie Trumbull	
2012	Rudyard Kipling's Mark of the Beast	Natalie	
2022	Exorcism of Fleete Marish	Natalie	

=== Television ===
Year	Title	Role	Notes
1997	Law & Order	Adele Green	Episode: "Thrill"
1999	Only Love	Rachel	TV film
2000	The Beat	Jacqueline Hutchinson	Episode: "The Beat Goes On"
2000	Law & Order: Special Victims Unit	Elaine Harrington	Episode: "Chat Room"
2000	The Truth About Jane	Jane	TV film
2000	Normal, Ohio	Dana Le Tour	Original pilot
2000	Cora Unashamed	Jessie at 18	TV film
2002	Superfire	Jill Perkins	TV film
2002	Two Against Time	Emma Portman	TV film
2003–2004	Dead Like Me	Georgia "George" Lass	Lead role (29 episodes); Nominated—Saturn Award for Best Actress on Television; Nominated—Satellite Award for Best Actress – Television Series Drama
2012	Are We There Yet?	Andrea	Episode: "The Inappropriate Website Episode"
2013	Hannibal	Georgia Madchen	Guest (2 episodes)

== Personal life ==
Muth has withdrawn from public life since her 2013 appearances on Hannibal, instead concentrating on a coffee business she launched and a cat-breeding business as of the early 2020s.
