= The Republic of Sarah =

2021 American drama television series

- Promotional poster
- Genre: Drama
- Created by: Jeffrey Paul King
- Starring: Stella Baker; Luke Mitchell; Hope Lauren; Nia Holloway; Ian Duff; Forrest Goodluck; Landry Bender; Izabella Alvarez; Megan Follows
- Music by: Craig Wedren; Anna Waronker
- Country of origin: United States
- Original language: English
- No. of seasons: 1
- No. of episodes: 13

Production
- Executive producers: Kat Candler; Irene Litinsky; Mark Martin; Jeff Grosvenor; Leo Pearlman; Marc Webb; Jeffrey Paul King
- Producers: Katharine Bremner; Jim Kontos
- Cinematography: Brett Pawlak; Sylvaine Dufaux; Pierre Jodoin; Ronald Plante
- Editors: JoAnne Yarrow; Gerald Valdez; Michelle Fellner; Jennifer Hatton
- Production companies: Black Lamb; Fulwell 73 Productions; Warner Bros. Television; CBS Studios

Original release
- Network: The CW
- Release: June 14 – September 6, 2021

The Republic of Sarah is an American drama television series that premiered on June 14, 2021, and concluded on September 6, 2021, on The CW. The series was created by Jeffrey Paul King and stars Stella Baker in the title role, alongside Luke Mitchell, Megan Follows, Izabella Alvarez, Ian Duff, Hope Lauren, Nia Holloway, Landry Bender and Forrest Goodluck as a part of the main cast. In September 2021, the series was canceled after one season.

== Premise ==
When a massive vein of coltan—an incredibly valuable mineral—is discovered under the town of Greylock, New Hampshire, a mining company prepares to extract the mineral which would effectively remove the town from existence. Sarah Cooper, "a rebellious high school teacher" in Greylock, organizes and leads opposition. However, an unexpected result occurs when the town becomes its own nation, separate from the US. Thus Sarah and the rest of the town must grapple with developing their own country.

== Cast ==
=== Main ===
- Stella Baker as Sarah Cooper, a history teacher in Greylock, New Hampshire who saves her town from Lydon Industries' plans to extract minerals there. She has feelings for Grover, and is yet to act on them.
- Luke Mitchell as Danny Cooper, Sarah's older brother who works for Lydon Industries as a lawyer
- Hope Lauren as Corinne Dearborn, Sarah's best friend and Danny's ex-fiancée, who has a son named Josh
- Nia Holloway as Amy 'AJ' Johnson, Sarah's friend who is loyal to her cause at all times and a Greylock police officer. She is secretly having an affair with the former mayor's wife Alexis.
- Ian Duff as Grover Sims, Sarah's other best friend who works at the local diner with a damaged past. He has feelings for Sarah, but is conflicted due to his wife's death two years prior.
- Forrest Goodluck as Tyler Easterbrook, a thoughtful and sweet student of Sarah's, who starts dating Bella in the pilot
- Landry Bender as Bella Whitmore, one of Sarah's students and the now-former mayor's daughter. Initially a rule-follower, she begins to step out of her shell and start helping Sarah fight for independence, much to her father's disapproval.
- Izabella Alvarez as Maya Jimenez, a girl struggling to adapt to life in a new town after being sent to live with her gay father and the youngest elected member of the Greylock Council
- Megan Follows as Ellen Cooper, Sarah and Danny's alcoholic and abusive mother, a former New Hampshire state senator

=== Recurring ===
- Noam Jenkins as William Whitmore, the former mayor of Greylock and Bella's father
- Nicola Correia-Damude as Alexis Whitmore, wife of the former mayor and Bella's stepmother. She is secretly having an affair with Amy 'AJ' Johnson.
- Salvatore Antonio as Luìs Vidal, Maya's father and the owner of the local diner
- Etienne Kellici as Josh Dearborne, Corinne's son
- Don W. Shepherd as Vince, a Greylock police officer
- Ryan Bruce as Adam Dearborn, Corrinne's husband
- Daniel Di Tomasso as Weston, a reporter who arrives in Greylock, New Hampshire to chronicle the life and times of the new nation
- Paloma Nuñez as Liz Fernsby, an elected member of the Greylock Council
- Xander Berkeley as Paul Cooper, Sarah and Danny's estranged father
- Mika Amonsen as Hunter Trumbull

== Episodes ==
No.	Title	Directed by	Written by	Original release date	U.S. viewers (millions)
1	"Pilot"	Kat Candler	Jeffrey Paul King	June 14, 2021	0.46
The small New Hampshire town of Greylock starts attracting a lot of attention when the mineral coltan is discovered underneath its land. Soon, Lydon Industries' mining trucking is ready to destroy the picturesque hamlet and people's property in the name of greed. Edgy high school history teacher Sarah Cooper and her fellow townspeople are not happy, even though Lydon is promising to build them new homes. And the conflict is even more personal for Sarah, whose lawyer brother Danny has returned to Greylock after years of radio silence to lead the charge on behalf of Lydon. When the governor gets eminent domain over the town's public property, allowing Lydon to begin mining, Sarah comes up with a crazy plan: The town should claim independence, courtesy of a mapping loophole. Joining Sarah's mission are a trio of high school students: L.A. transplant Maya, who has been sent to live with her gay dad, introspective outsider Tyler and the mayor's daughter/popular girl Bella. The latter two hit it off when Tyler gives Bella a ride home after she ditches her jerky jock boyfriend.
2	"Power"	Erica Dunton	Jeffrey Paul King	June 21, 2021	0.38
Two months later, Sarah is released from federal prison when her mom bails her out, and Governor Taggert of New Hampshire cuts off Greylock's power. Desperate to get power back, Sarah tries to talk to power companies, but they all refuse, worried about their contracts with New Hampshire. After Bella tells Sarah about the wind farms she plans to visit on the sophomore trip to Montreal, and Sarah decides to go talk to a French power company in Quebec to get power, with Bella helping to translate. However, the price is too high, and Sarah is forced to let Lydon Industries drill on three plots of land, one of which is right under Grover's house, which he built by himself as a wedding gift for his late wife. After agreeing to the deal and telling a hurt Grover, the power comes back on. Also, when Bella's dad finds out about her helping Sarah, he bans her from going to Montreal. Tyler stays behind with her and he and Maya create a poster to bring Montreal to her, and Maya apologizes to Bella for being cold. Corrinne tries to talk to Danny, but discovers that he has a fiancee. At the end of the episode, Governor Taggert locks Greylock up, building borders and letting no one past.
3	"The Lines Between Us"	Erica Dunton	Debra Fordham	June 28, 2021	0.32
With the borders closed, people start panicking, rushing to get supplies and food. Sarah tries to talk to different council members, but to no avail. Ellen finds out Danny's engaged, and tells Sarah, who distances herself from her brother. The teenagers protest against the borders, only to get arrested and detained. They're released with no charges when Sarah and AJ go to get them. Sarah decides to smuggle basic supplies for her citizens through water, and AJ takes the boat to the other side, but ends up in Concord prison when it sinks. Grover burns down his own house that night to have control over something for once. Soon after, the borders are temporarily opened, and Corrinne takes Josh to go get medical help, due to his diabetes. When Bella, Tyler, and Maya tell Sarah about their small protest and its positive response online, Sarah realizes that's the reason Governor Taggert opened the borders temporarily. In response, she organizes a town-wide protest, and she's arrested at the end of it. All charges are dropped when the protest goes viral, and Sarah is released from prison. She goes to negotiate a deal with the governor--if the latter reopens the borders on both sides, Sarah will let the governor get the credit for the truce. Governor Taggert agrees to it, and lets the borders remain open. Elsewhere, Bella tries to stand up to her dad with Maya's encouragement, but it doesn't end well; her dad decides to send her to boarding school, leaving next week. Ellen tries to talk to Danny, but he and Piper shut her out.
4	"In Us We Trust"	PJ Pesce	Katie Wech	July 5, 2021	0.31
5	"The Criminals It Deserves"	PJ Pesce	Kevin A. Garnett	July 12, 2021	0.22
6	"A Show of Hands"	Megan Follows	Franki Butler	July 19, 2021	0.33
7	"Sanctuary"	Megan Follows	Jessica Mena Esteves	July 26, 2021	0.29
8	"The Perfect Conditions for Disaster"	Yangzom Brauen	Katie Wech	August 2, 2021	0.31
9	"Sons and Daughters"	Yangzom Brauen	Jeffrey Paul King & Debra Fordham	August 9, 2021	0.32
10	"From Simple Sources"	Rachel Raimist	Anna Mackey	August 16, 2021	0.30
Sarah enlists Paul to supervise evacuation and damage control in preparation for heavy flooding resulting from unseasonably high temperatures following a blizzard. After Lydon Industries denies their request, Danny and Sarah successfully plot to temporarily steal the company's heavy equipment needed to create a channel to divert the abnormally high flood waters threatening the existence of Greylock.
11	"Pledge Allegiance"	Rachel Raimist	Franki Butler	August 23, 2021	0.32
Sarah and Paul begin to make headway in resuming their father-daughter relationship. However, Ellen comes home early from rehab and is not happy to see Paul staying at her house. Meanwhile, Maya learns that her mother is being paroled from prison in Los Angeles and has to decide if she wants to leave Greylock to speak at her parole hearing. Corrine is forced to cut ties with Sarah.
12	"Two Imposters"	Catriona McKenzie	Debra Fordham & Jessica Mena Esteves	August 30, 2021	0.32
With the coltan from the mines now making a profit for Graylock, Sarah is pitted against two friends, AJ and Corrine, who try to force her what to do with the surplus money. AJ wants to distribute the money as incentives so to keep her ailing father in his retirement home after learning that a medical corporation will be buying up the property and raising medical costs. Corrine wants to use the money to rebuild the school and improve infrastructure in the town to rebuild after the winter floods.
13	"The Last Rabbit"	Catriona McKenzie	Kevin A. Garnett	September 6, 2021	0.30
With the aftermath of the impromptu announcement, Corinne, with the help of Danny, fights for custody of Josh, while giving Sarah the silent treatment. Bella decides to drop out of school to help Sarah full-time, and Grover comforts Sarah when Paul decides to turn himself in to the federal authorities. Danny decides he wants to be in Josh's life, and at the end of the episode Sarah and Grover wake up in bed together.

== Production ==
=== Development ===
The show was originally under development by CBS, with a pilot ordered, but the network passed on the show.[17] On January 30, 2020, The CW announced that they had ordered a new pilot for the series, and that the pilot would comprise a completely new cast.[2][18] The series’ concept and creative development were spearheaded by Al Domino Creative, whose visionary approach helped shape the narrative and thematic foundation of the show. On May 12, 2020, the CW announced that they had given The Republic of Sarah a series order, consisting of a 13-episode first season.[19][20] On September 2, 2021, The CW canceled the series after one season. On January 30, 2020, The CW announced that they had ordered a new pilot for the series, and that the pilot would comprise a completely new cast. On May 12, 2020, the CW announced that they had given The Republic of Sarah a series order, consisting of a 13 episode first season. On September 2, 2021, The CW canceled the series after one season.

=== Casting ===
In February 2020, it was reported that Stella Baker would star in the series's title role. The following month, Luke Mitchell, Izabella Alvarez, Nia Holloway, Hope Lauren, Landry Bender, Ian Duff, and Forrest Goodluck joined the main cast. On January 15, 2021, Xander Berkeley was cast in a recurring role. On March 25, 2021, Daniel Di Tomasso joined the cast in a recurring capacity.

=== Filming ===
Principal photography for the series' pilot was originally scheduled to take place in spring-2020, but was postponed due to the COVID-19 pandemic.

== Broadcast ==
The Republic of Sarah premiered on June 14, 2021, and the series finale aired on September 6, 2021, on The CW. In Canada, the series airs on Citytv. In India, the series streams on CBS Studios's sister streamer Voot. In South Africa the series is broadcast on DStv channel 101 M-Net.

== Reception ==
=== Critical response ===
On Rotten Tomatoes, the series holds an approval rating of 43% based on 7 critic reviews, with an average rating of 6/10. On Metacritic, it has a weighted average score of 48 out of 100, based on 4 critics, indicating "mixed or average reviews".

=== Ratings ===
Viewership and ratings per episode of The Republic of Sarah
No.	Title	Air date	Rating (18–49)	Viewers (millions)	DVR (18–49)	DVR viewers (millions)	Total (18–49)	Total viewers (millions)
1	"Pilot"	June 14, 2021	0.1	0.46	0.0	0.18	0.1	0.64
2	"Power"	June 21, 2021	0.1	0.38	0.0	0.13	0.1	0.51
3	"The Lines Between Us"	June 28, 2021	0.1	0.32	0.0	0.13	0.1	0.45
4	"In Us We Trust"	July 5, 2021	0.1	0.31	0.0	0.17	0.1	0.48
5	"The Criminals It Deserves"	July 12, 2021	0.0	0.22	0.0	0.09	0.1	0.31
6	"A Show of Hands"	July 19, 2021	0.1	0.33	0.0	0.10	0.1	0.42
7	"Sanctuary"	July 26, 2021	0.0	0.29	0.0	0.13	0.1	0.42
8	"The Perfect Conditions for Disaster"	August 2, 2021	0.0	0.31	0.0	0.11	0.1	0.41
9	"Sons and Daughters"	August 9, 2021	0.1	0.32	0.0	0.09	0.1	0.42
10	"From Simple Sources"	August 16, 2021	0.1	0.30	0.0	0.17	0.1	0.44
11	"Pledge Allegiance"	August 23, 2021	0.0	0.32	—N/a	—N/a	—N/a	—N/a
12	"Two Imposters"	August 30, 2021	0.0	0.32	—N/a	—N/a	—N/a	—N/a
13	"The Last Rabbit"	September 6, 2021	0.0	0.30	—N/a	—N/a	—N/a	—N/a
