= Cheryl Schmidt =

Cheryl K. Schmidt is an American nurse educator, nursing researcher, and former United States Army Nurse Corps officer. She is a Clinical Professor at Arizona State University's Edson College of Nursing and Health Innovation. She has also worked with the American Red Cross on disaster nursing education. She was inducted as a Fellow of the American Academy of Nursing in 2012. She was also awarded the Florence Nightingale Medal by the International Committee of the Red Cross in 2011.

== Early life and education ==
Schmidt grew up in rural Ohio and was influenced by her mother, who was a nurse and nursing educator associated with the World War II-era Cadet Nurse Corps. She received a diploma in nursing from the Trumbull Memorial Hospital School of Nursing in Warren, Ohio, in 1970. She subsequently earned a Bachelor of Science in nursing from The Ohio State University in 1973 and a Master of Science in nursing from the university in 1975. She received a PhD in nursing from the University of Pittsburgh in 1999. She also completed the United States Army Command and General Staff College program.

Her early nursing experience included staff nursing at Trumbull Memorial Hospital and The Ohio State University Hospitals, work as a camp nurse, participation in interprofessional health teams in Appalachia, and involvement in a National Library of Medicine quality-of-care study.

== Career ==
Schmidt began her academic career at Eastern Michigan University, where she served as an assistant professor of nursing from 1975 to 1983. She also held faculty positions at the University of North Dakota School of Nursing from 1983 to 1988 and Youngstown State University from 1988 to 1993. In 1994, she joined the University of Arkansas for Medical Sciences (UAMS) College of Nursing, where she taught community health nursing, research, and evidence-based practice and served on doctoral dissertation committees. She also served as Interim Associate Dean for prelicensure programs. In 2015, she was granted tenure and emeritus faculty status by UAMS.

Schmidt served in the United States Army Nurse Corps Reserve for more than two decades and attained the rank of Lieutenant Colonel. During Operation Desert Storm, she served as Assistant Chief Nurse of the 350th Evacuation Hospital. After sustaining an injury in 1991, she was assigned to Walter Reed Army Medical Center in Washington, D.C.

In 2016, Schmidt joined Arizona State University's Edson College of Nursing and Health Innovation as a Clinical Professor. She also served as Interim Associate Director of Prelicensure Programs from 2017 to 2018.

== Research and scholarly work ==
Schmidt's research has covered nursing education, community health, disaster preparedness, children's health, and disaster nursing. Her work has examined nurses' preparation for emergency response, the effects of disasters on young people, and children's understanding of health and anatomy.

In a 2013 article in Nursing Clinics of North America, Schmidt and Sara L. Jones reviewed research on the psychological and social effects of disasters on children and adolescents. They also discussed factors associated with resilience and the potential to reduce longer-term effects.
