= Joaquin Jackson =

Texas ranger (1935–2016)

- Born: Haynie Joaquin Jackson; November 12, 1935; Anton, Texas, United States
- Died: June 15, 2016 (aged 80); Alpine, Texas, United States
- Spouses: Shirley Conor Jackson; Jewely Van Valin
- Children: 3
- Police career
- Country: United States
- Department: Texas Rangers
- Service years: 1966 to 1993
- Other work: Author, actor, private investigator, NRA Board member

Haynie Joaquin Jackson (November 12, 1935 – June 15, 2016) was a Texas Ranger most notable for his appearance on the February 1994 cover of Texas Monthly magazine, after which he became the icon of the modern Texas Rangers. Jackson died at his home in Alpine, Texas on June 15, 2016.

== Texas Ranger ==
Joaquin Jackson was assigned to a wide swath of the Texas-Mexico border from 1966 to 1993. He was involved in a shootout at the Carrizo Springs jail that ended a jail revolt. He captured "The See More Kid," an elusive horse thief and burglar who left clean dishes and swept floors in the houses he burglarized. He investigated the 1988 shootings in Big Bend's Colorado Canyon and tried to understand the motives of the Mexican teenagers who terrorized three river rafters and killed one.

While a Texas Ranger, Jackson was instrumental in starting the career of country singer Johnny Rodriguez. In 1969, a teenage Rodriguez was jailed and would often sing in his cell; Jackson, who overheard Rodriguez and was impressed by his voice, told his friend, music promoter James "Happy" Shahan, about him, and Shahan then hired Rodriguez for his first singing gigs.

== Acting career ==
Jackson was in several movies, namely as the character Sheriff Wes Wheeler in the 1995 motion picture The Good Old Boys with Tommy Lee Jones, in the 1997 made-for-TV movie Rough Riders, and in a 1997 TV mini-series, Streets of Laredo, based on author Larry McMurtry's novel of the same title. Jackson also played the fictional Sheriff Jackson in the 2008 movie Palo Pinto Gold, starring singer Trent Willmon, and appears as Archie in the motion picture Poodle Dog Lounge, released in late 2008. Jackson also served as a role model for Jeff Bridges' character Texas Ranger Marcus Hamilton in the 2016 film Hell or High Water and similarly for Nick Nolte's character Texas Ranger Jack Benteen in the 1987 film Extreme Prejudice.

His last film was Wild Horses released in 2015. Joaquin co-starred with Robert Duvall.

== Personal ==
Jackson was one of the last of the Garrison Rangers and resigned from the Texas Rangers in 1993 when then Gov. Ann Richards promoted several women into the ranks of the Texas Rangers. He lived in Alpine, Texas, where he was the owner and operator of a private investigations firm. Born and raised in Anton, Texas on November 12, 1935, Joaquin was a talented athlete and went on to play basketball for West Texas State University in Canyon, Texas. Jackson had two children, Michael W. Kirkpatrick and Kelly Landrith prior to marrying his wife Shirley Conor Jackson who died on February 11, 2012, after a year-and-a-half-long illness. He had two sons with Shirley, Don Joaquin Jackson and Lance Sterling Jackson, and four grandchildren, Adam Michael, Tyler Joaquin, Ellen Elizabeth, and Ann Margaret (Maggie). After the death of his wife Shirley Jackson, Joaquin married Jewely Van Valin and they were married until his death. His son Don Joaquin served 29 years in prison on murder charges but was released in 2019. Jackson was an avid hunter, golfer, and enjoyed arrowhead hunting in his retirement.

== NRA board member ==
Jackson was a member in the NRA Board of Directors and stated that he felt assault weapons, by which he meant fully-automatic machine guns (as clarified in a later statement), should be reserved for military and police use and that he is against high capacity magazines for those not in military or law enforcement. Jackson also clarified that his comments about magazines were taken out of context (hunting only), and that he did not support magazine bans.
