= Lynn Collins =

American actress (born 1977)

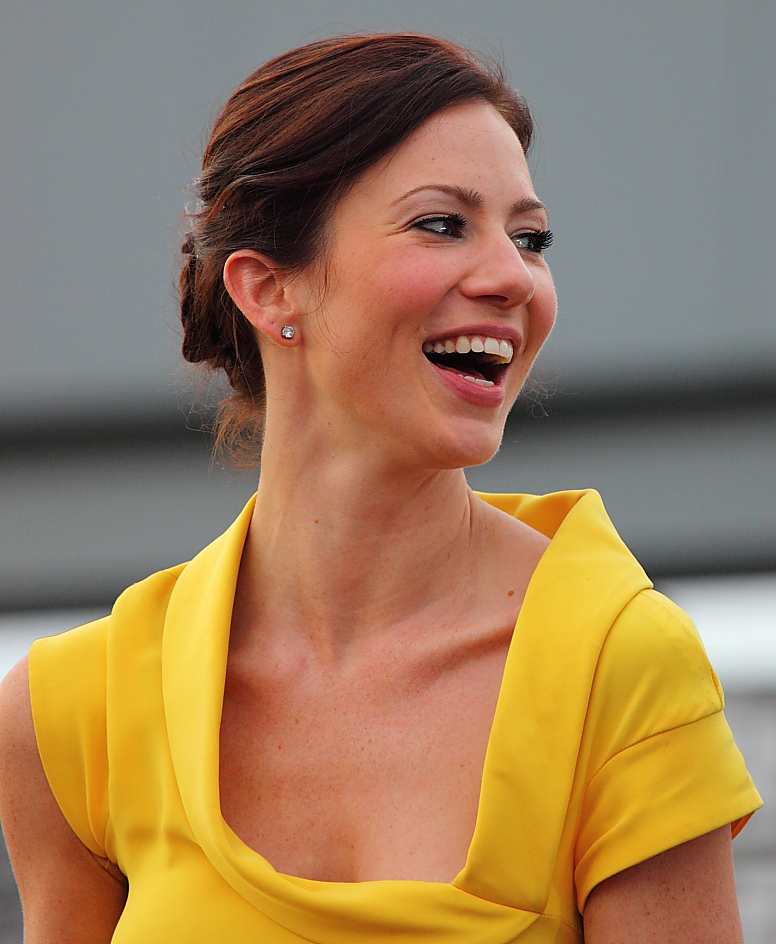
- Collins at the X-Men Origins: Wolverine premiere, April 2009
- Born: Viola Lynn Collins; June 1, 1979 (age 47); College Station, Texas, U.S.
- Education: Juilliard School (BFA)
- Occupation: Actress
- Years active: 1999–present
- Spouses: Steven Strait (m. 2007; div. 2013); Matthew Boyle (m. 2014; div. 2016)
- Children: 1

Viola Lynn Collins (born June 1, 1979) is an American actress. She has made television appearances in True Blood (2008), Manhunt: Unabomber (2017) and The Walking Dead (2021–2022), and is recognized for her roles in films such as X-Men Origins: Wolverine (2009) and John Carter (2012).

== Early life ==
Viola Lynn Collins was born in College Station, Texas, on June 1, 1979. Collins has claimed English, Scottish, Irish and Cherokee ancestry. Collins grew up in Houston, Texas, and lived in Singapore from ages 4 to 10. She also spent several summers in Japan. During a childhood Christmas pageant in which she played Mrs. Claus, Collins discovered her love for acting.

In the 1990s, she graduated from Juilliard School's Drama Division (Group 28) with a Bachelor of Fine Arts degree.

== Career ==
Collins made her television debut in 1999, in an episode of Law & Order: Special Victims Unit, and went on to star onstage as Ophelia opposite Liev Schreiber in Hamlet, followed by a turn as Juliet in Romeo and Juliet. After bit parts that included a stint on the series Haunted and roles in the films Down with Love (2003), 50 First Dates (2004) and 13 Going on 30 (2004), she gained notice in the film The Merchant of Venice (2004) as the female lead Portia, alongside Al Pacino, Joseph Fiennes and Jeremy Irons. Collins' audition tape for the supporting role of Jessica having so impressed director Michael Radford that — upon Cate Blanchett's opting out as Portia (due to pregnancy) — Radford had championed Collins becoming Blanchett's replacement.

She furthered her profile in 2008 when she was cast as Jason Stackhouse's girlfriend Dawn Green in the first season of the HBO vampire series True Blood, and through a featured role as the hero's love interest Kayla Silverfox in X-Men Origins: Wolverine (2009) opposite Hugh Jackman. Her first leading film role came when she was cast as the headstrong Martian princess Dejah Thoris in John Carter (2012).

== Personal life ==
Collins married Steven Strait on December 23, 2007, after a four-year relationship. Collins and Strait separated in 2013.

She married Matthew Boyle in November 2014. They divorced in 2016. They have a son.

In 2009, she posed nude for the May issue of Allure magazine.

Collins was raised in a "very, very religious" family of Southern Baptists and has since explored several religious faiths, describing herself as a "pretty spiritual person."

== Filmography ==
=== Film ===
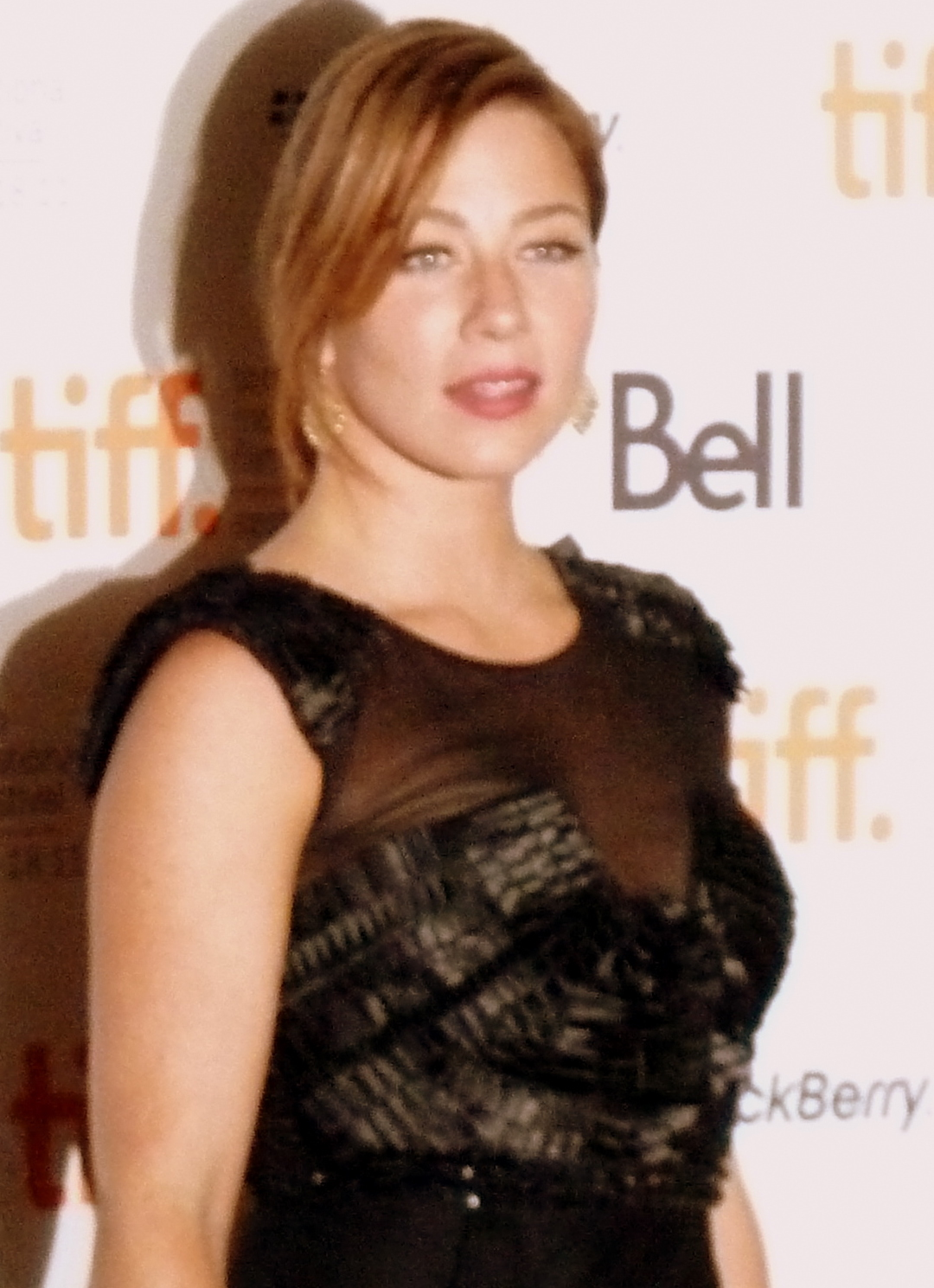
Collins at the 2011 Toronto International Film Festival

| Year | Title | Role | Notes |
|---|---|---|---|
| 2002 | Never Get Outta the Boat | Stacy | |
| 2003 | Down with Love | Beatnik Girl | |
| 2004 | 50 First Dates | Linda | |
| 2004 | 13 Going on 30 | Wendy | |
| 2004 | The Merchant of Venice | Portia | |
| 2006 | Return to Rajapur | Sara Reardon | |
| 2006 | Bug | R.C. | |
| 2006 | The Lake House | Mona | |
| 2006 | The Dog Problem | Lola | |
| 2007 | The Number 23 | Suicide Blonde / Mrs. Dobkins / Young Fingerling's Mother | |
| 2007 | Numb | Sara Harrison | |
| 2007 | Towelhead | Thena Panos | |
| 2008 | Life in Flight | Kate Voss | |
| 2008 | Uncertainty | Kate Montero | |
| 2009 | X-Men Origins: Wolverine | Kayla Silverfox | |
| 2009 | Blood Creek | Barb | |
| 2010 | City Island | Vince's Bombshell Girlfriend | |
| 2011 | Angels Crest | Cindy | |
| 2011 | 10 Years | Anna | |
| 2012 | John Carter | Dejah Thoris | |
| 2012 | Unconditional | Samantha Crawford | |
| 2013 | The Wolverine | Kayla Silverfox | Archival audio (uncredited) |
| 2015 | Lost in the Sun | Mary | |
| 2016 | The Hollow Point | Marla | |
| 2019 | Rim of the World | Major Collins | |
| 2019 | Beneath Us | Liz Rhodes | |
| 2024 | Someone Like You | Louise Quinn | |

=== Television ===
| Year | Title | Role | Notes |
|---|---|---|---|
| 1999 | Law & Order: Special Victims Unit | Virginia Hayes | Episode: "Wanderlust" |
| 2001 | Earth Angels | Catarin | Television film |
| 2001 | The Education of Max Bickford | | Episode: "Who Is Breckenridge Long?" |
| 2002 | Push, Nevada | BRB's Wife | Episode: "The Amount" |
| 2002 | Haunted | Assistant D.A. Jessica Manning | 5 episodes |
| 2008 | True Blood | Dawn Green | 6 episodes |
| 2013 | Elementary | Tanya Barrett | Episode: "Solve for X" |
| 2014 | Covert Affairs | Olga Akarova | 3 episodes |
| 2015 | A Mother Betrayed | Monica | Television film |
| 2017 | Manhunt: Unabomber | Natalie Rogers | 7 episodes |
| 2019 | The Fix | Dr. Carys Daly | 2 episodes |
| 2020 | Bosch | Alicia Kent | 8 episodes |
| 2021–2022 | The Walking Dead | Leah Shaw | 14 episodes |

== Awards and nominations ==
| Year | Award | Category | Nominated work | Result |
|---|---|---|---|---|
| 2005 | 9th Golden Satellite Awards | Best Supporting Actress – Musical or Comedy | The Merchant of Venice | Nominated |
| 2009 | 11th Teen Choice Awards | Choice Movie: Fresh Face – Female | X-Men Origins: Wolverine | Nominated |
