= Kat Candler =

American independent filmmaker

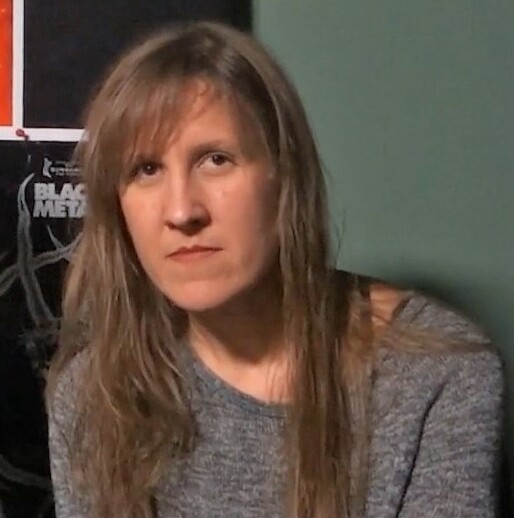
- Candler interviewed in 2013
- Born: Atlanta, Georgia
- Education: Florida State University
- Occupation: Filmmaker

Kat Candler (born November 11, 1974) is an American film writer, producer, and director. She wrote and directed the 2014 film Hellion, and has worked on television shows including 13 Reasons Why and Queen Sugar.

== Life ==
Candler grew up in Jacksonville, Florida. After graduating from Florida State University, she began her filmmaking career in Austin, Texas.

== Career ==
Hellion, starring actors Aaron Paul and Juliette Lewis, screened at the Sundance Film Festival. Candler's work in television includes directing seven episodes of Ava DuVernay and Oprah Winfrey's Queen Sugar. Candler oversaw season two of Queen Sugar as the producing director and season three as its showrunner. Candler directed two episodes of the Netflix series 13 Reasons Why—season two, episode nine "The Missing Page" and season two, episode ten "Smile, Bitches." During season three, she continued with the show as the consulting producer. Candler directed season two, episode nine of Sorry for Your Loss, entitled "The Whale." Candler also directed two episodes of the Apple TV+ show Home Before Dark—season one, episode five "88 Miles an Hour" and season one, episode six "The Green Bike"< as well as season two, episode three of Dirty John. The episode—entitled "Marriage Encounter"—aired June 9, 2020 on the USA Network.

Candler is currently writing and developing a horror film for Fox Searchlight and a TV series set in the oil refinery world of southeast Texas for TNT. Most recently, she was listed as the director of the television pilot The Republic of Sarah for The CW, set to premiere some time in 2021. Candler is writing, executive producing and developing Lords of Dogtown for IMDb TV, a television series based on the 2005 film of the same name. Candler directed 2 episodes of the Netflix 2026 series Little House on the Prairie.

== Awards ==
- 2014 Sundance Institute Women's Initiative Fellow
- 2014 San Francisco Film Society/Kenneth Rainin Foundation Grant, Untitled Black Metal Project
- 2014 deadCenter Film Festival, Grand Jury Prize, Hellion
- 2014 Sundance Film Festival Nomination Grand Jury Prize, Hellion
- 2014 SXSW Gamechanger Award Special Mention, Hellion
- 2014 Humanitas Prize Nomination, Hellion
- 2014 Dallas International Film Festival, Grand Jury Prize, Hellion
- 2013 Austin Film Grant, Hellion
- 2013 San Francisco Film Society/Kenneth Rainin Foundation Grant, Hellion
- 2013 Best Narrative Short, deadCenter Film Festival, Black Metal
- 2013 Grand Jury Prize, Dallas International Film Festival, Black Metal
- 2012 No Borders IFP Participant, Hellion
- 2012 Best Short Film, Cine Chicks Film Festival, Hellion
- 2012 Texas Filmmakers Production Fund Recipient, Black Metal
- 2012 Best Live Action Short, BAMKids, Love Bug
- 2012 Best Live Action Short, Children's Film Festival Seattle, Love Bug
- 2011 IFP Emerging Narrative Participant, Nikki is a Punk Rocker
- 2011 Best Short, Festival Internacional de Cine Para Ninos, Love Bug
- 2010 2nd Place Jury Prize, Chicago's Children's Film Festival, Love Bug
- 2010 Best Florida Short Film, Jacksonville Film Festival, Love Bug
- 2010 semi-finalist, Austin Film Festival, Never Date a Teen Idol
- 2010 Traverse City Comedy Arts Festival, Audience Award, Love Bug
- 2009 Austin Film Festival Audience Award, Love Bug
- 2009 Official Participant in the Tribeca All Access Program, The Spider in the Bathtub
- 2007 Austin Chronicle Cover Story
- 2007 Austin Breakout Filmmaker, Austin American Statesman

== Filmography ==
- The Republic of Sarah (Director 101), The CW
- Home Before Dark (Director 105 & 106), Apple TV+
- Dirty John (Director 203), USA
- Sorry for Your Loss (Director 209), Facebook Watch
- Queen Sugar Season Three (Director, 312 and 313)
- Queen Sugar Season Three (Writer, 301, 309 and 313)
- Queen Sugar Season Three (Showrunner), OWN Network
- Queen Sugar Season Two (Director 201 and 207), OWN Network
- Queen Sugar Season Two (Producing Director Season 2), OWN Network
- 13 Reasons Why (director, two episodes, season 2), Netflix
- 12 Monkeys (Director 306), SyFy
- Queen Sugar (Director 108 and 109), Harpo Productions
- Bad Moms, (2nd Unit Director), STX Entertainment
- The Rusted, 20 minutes, (Writer, Director), Canon, Grey Agency
- Hellion (2014) Feature film
- Black Metal (2013) – director, writer, producer
- Love Me (2012) – writer
- Saturday Morning Massacre (2012) – story by
- Hellion (2012) Short film – director, writer
- Love Bug (2009) – director, writer
- Jumping Off Bridges (2006) – director, writer, producer
- Pilot and Olo (TV Short) (2005) – director, writer
- Roberta Wells (2004) – director, writer
- The Absence of Wings (2002) – director, writer, editor
- Cicadas (2000) - director, writer, producer, editor
- Little House on the Prairie (2026, Netflix) - director
